= Fear the Walking Dead season 4 =

Fear the Walking Dead
- Season 4
- Home media cover art
- Showrunners: Andrew Chambliss; Ian Goldberg
- Starring: Kim Dickens; Frank Dillane; Alycia Debnam-Carey; Maggie Grace; Colman Domingo; Danay García; Garret Dillahunt; Lennie James; Jenna Elfman
- No. of episodes: 16

Release
- Original network: AMC
- Original release: April 15 – September 30, 2018

Season chronology
- ← Previous; Season 3 Next → Season 5

The fourth season of the American horror-drama television series Fear the Walking Dead premiered on April 15, 2018 and concluded on September 30, 2018 on AMC. The series is a companion series to The Walking Dead, which is based on the comic book series of the same name by Robert Kirkman, Tony Moore, and Charlie Adlard. The season premiere contains the first crossover between the two series. Andrew Chambliss and Ian B. Goldberg assumed the role of showrunner after Dave Erickson's departure. Executive producers include Kirkman, David Alpert, Greg Nicotero, Gale Anne Hurd, Scott M. Gimple, Chambliss, and Goldberg.

The season marks a departure from the previous entries, with the story shifting from being a prequel to running concurrently with The Walking Dead. In addition to the group of Madison Clark (Kim Dickens), her daughter Alicia (Alycia Debnam-Carey), her drug-addicted son Nick (Frank Dillane), his lover Luciana Galvez (Danay García), and grifter Victor Strand (Colman Domingo) from the previous seasons, the story follows The Walking Dead character Morgan Jones (Lennie James) as he encounters them amid their conflict with the antagonistic Vultures. Several new characters are also introduced in the fourth season, including journalist Althea Szewczyk-Przygocki (Maggie Grace), police officer John Dorie (Garret Dillahunt), and nurse June (Jenna Elfman). The series moved to a new filming location, Austin, Texas.

== Cast ==
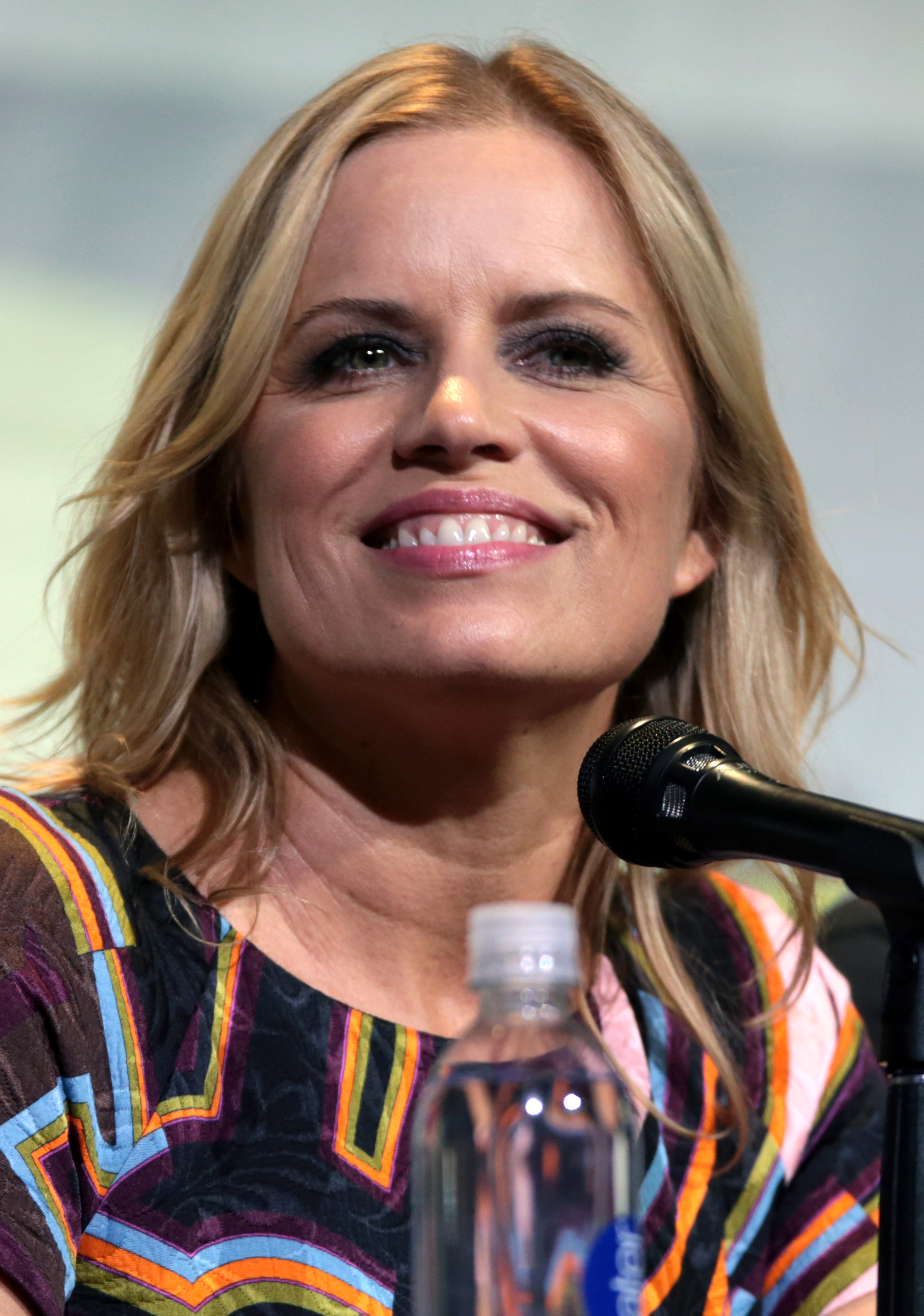
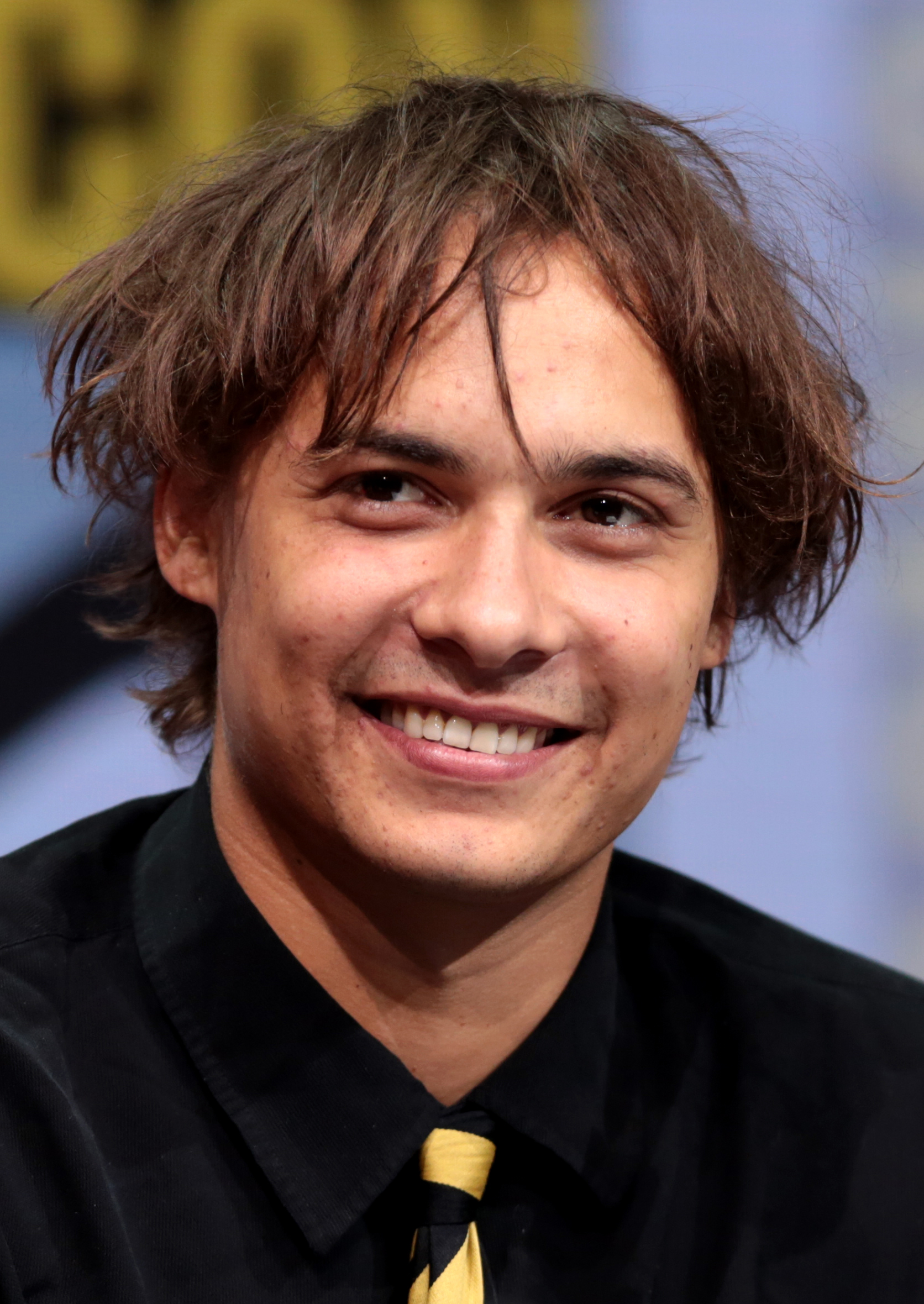
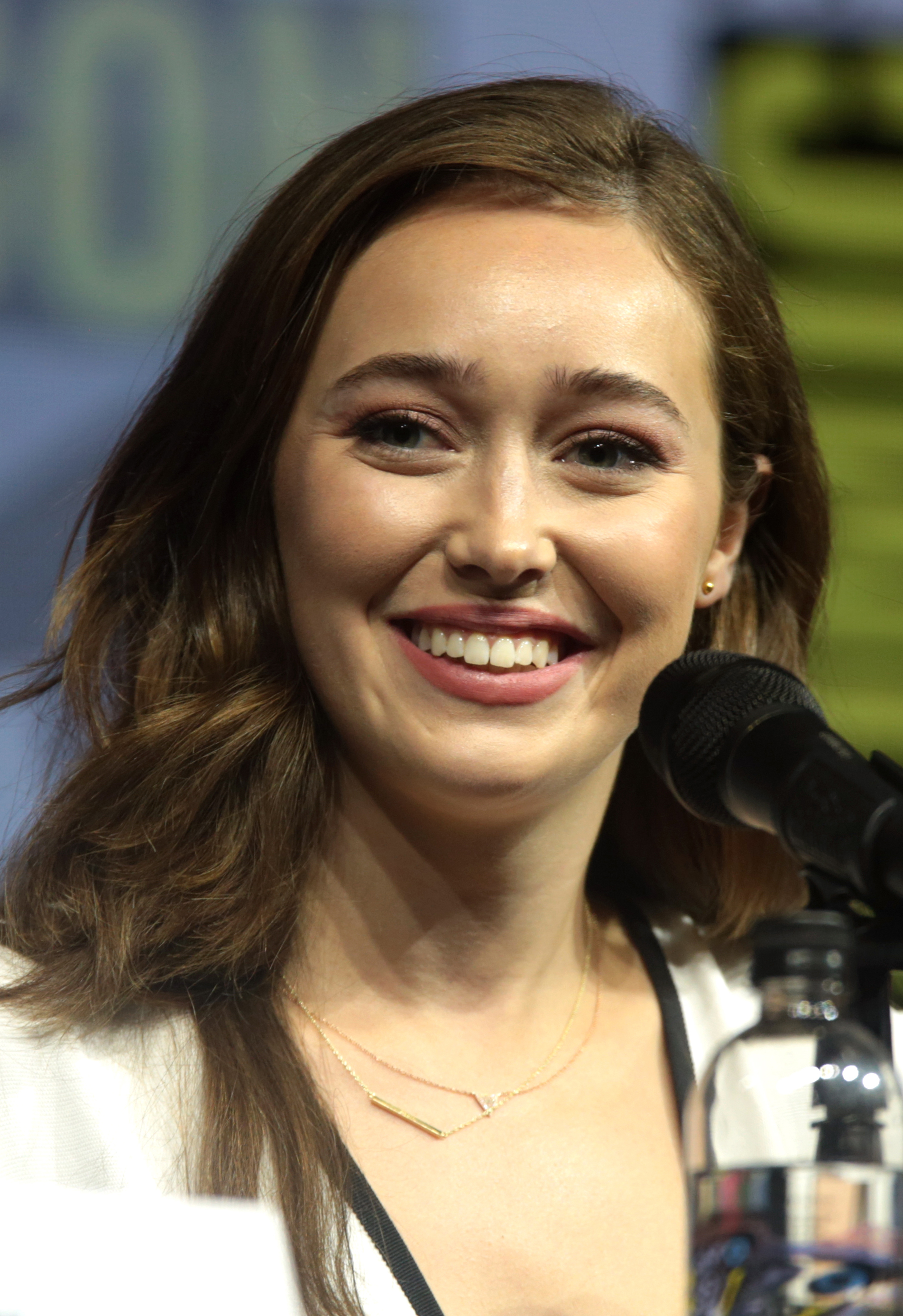
Kim Dickens (Madison Clark), Frank Dillane (Nick Clark), and Alycia Debnam-Carey (Alicia Clark)
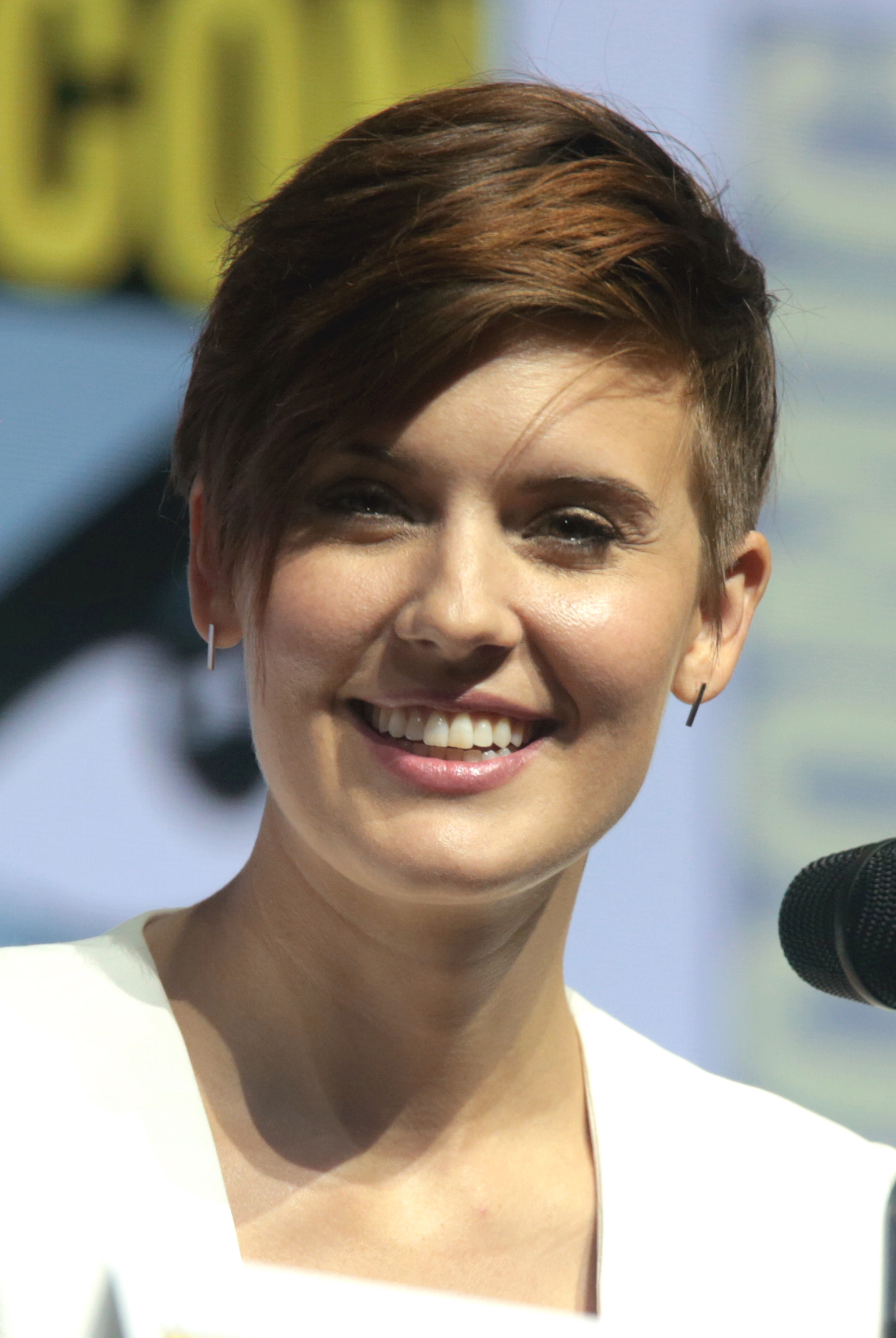
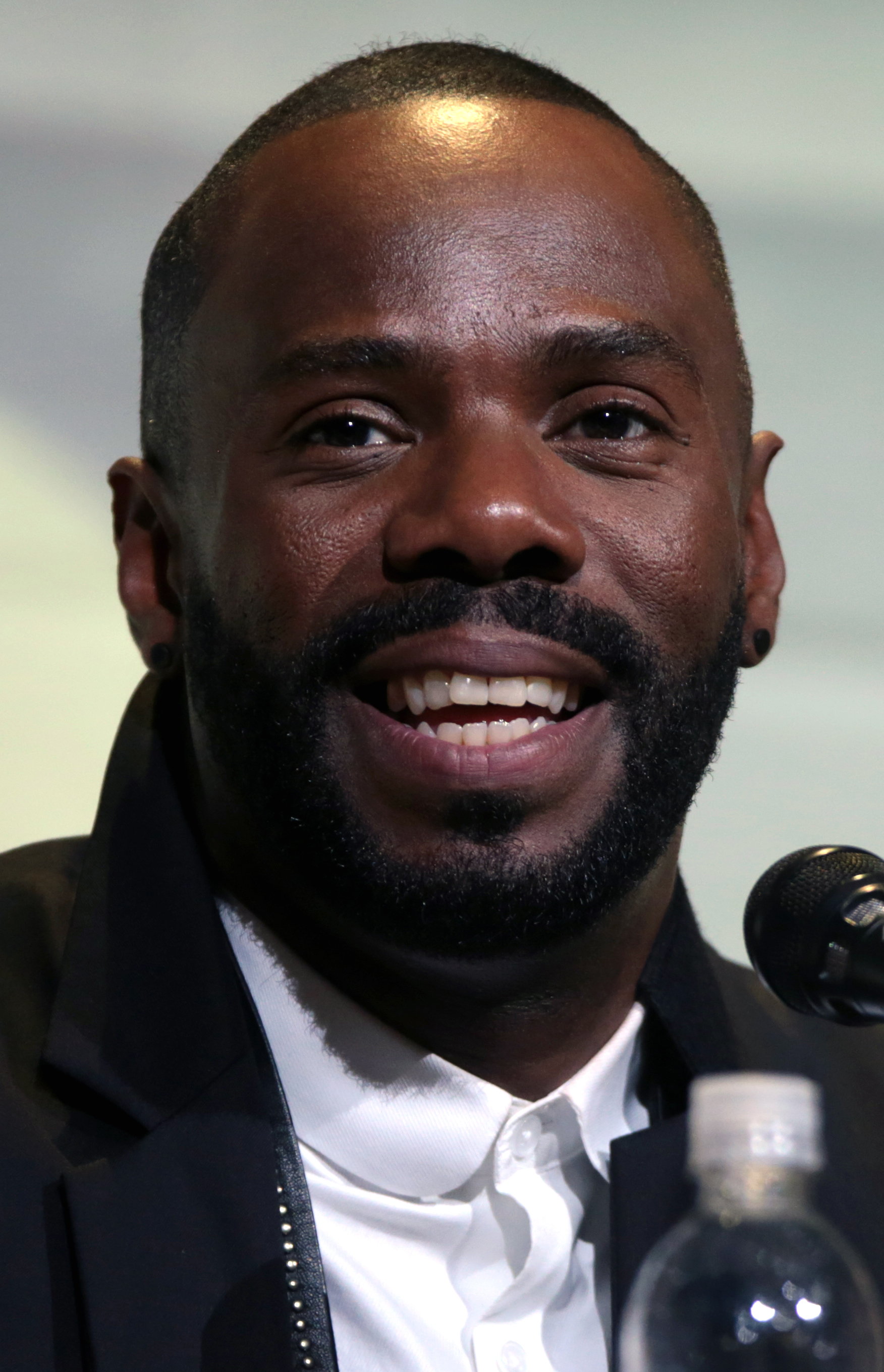
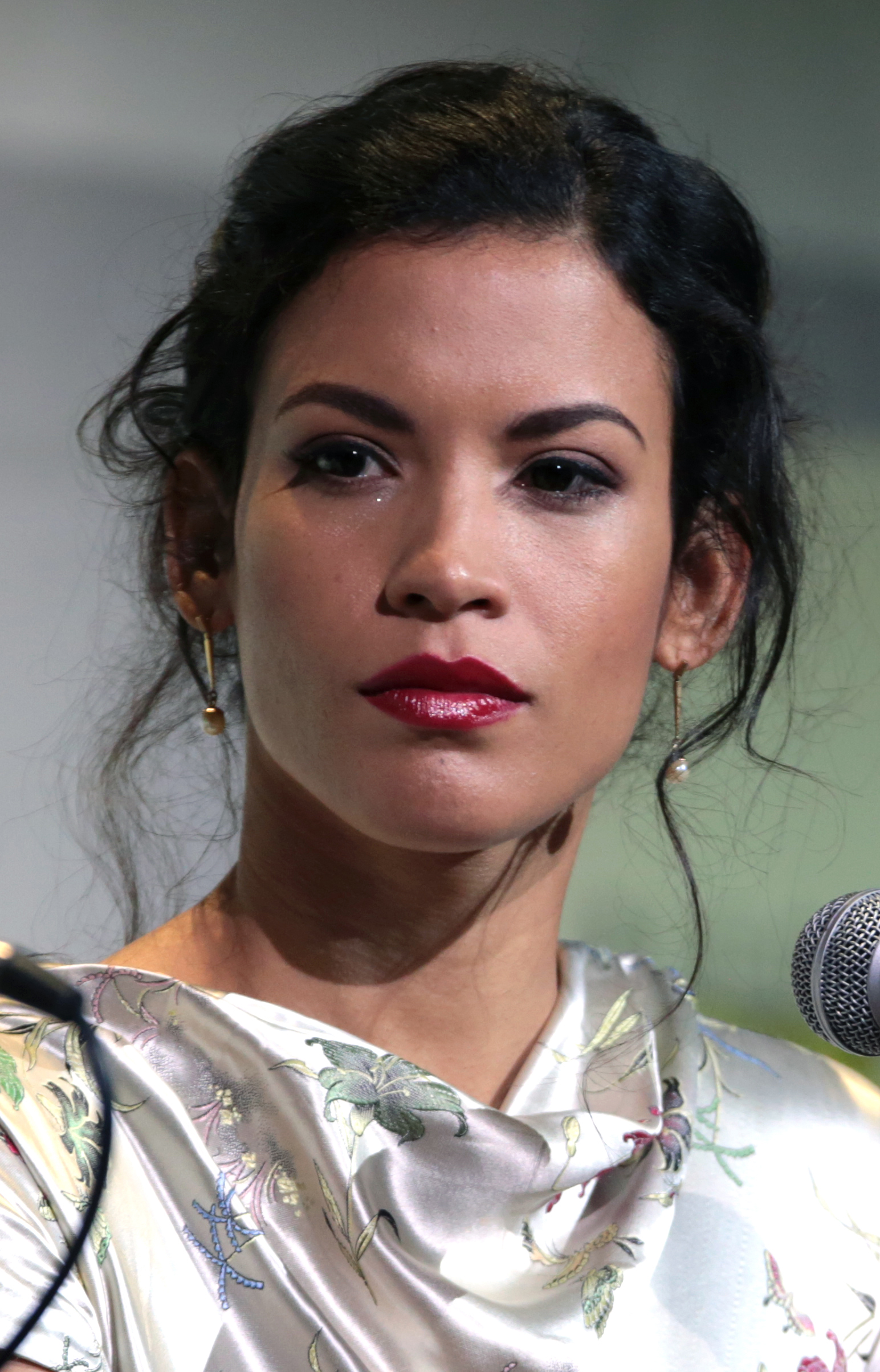
Maggie Grace (Althea), Colman Domingo (Victor Strand), and Danay García (Luciana Galvez)
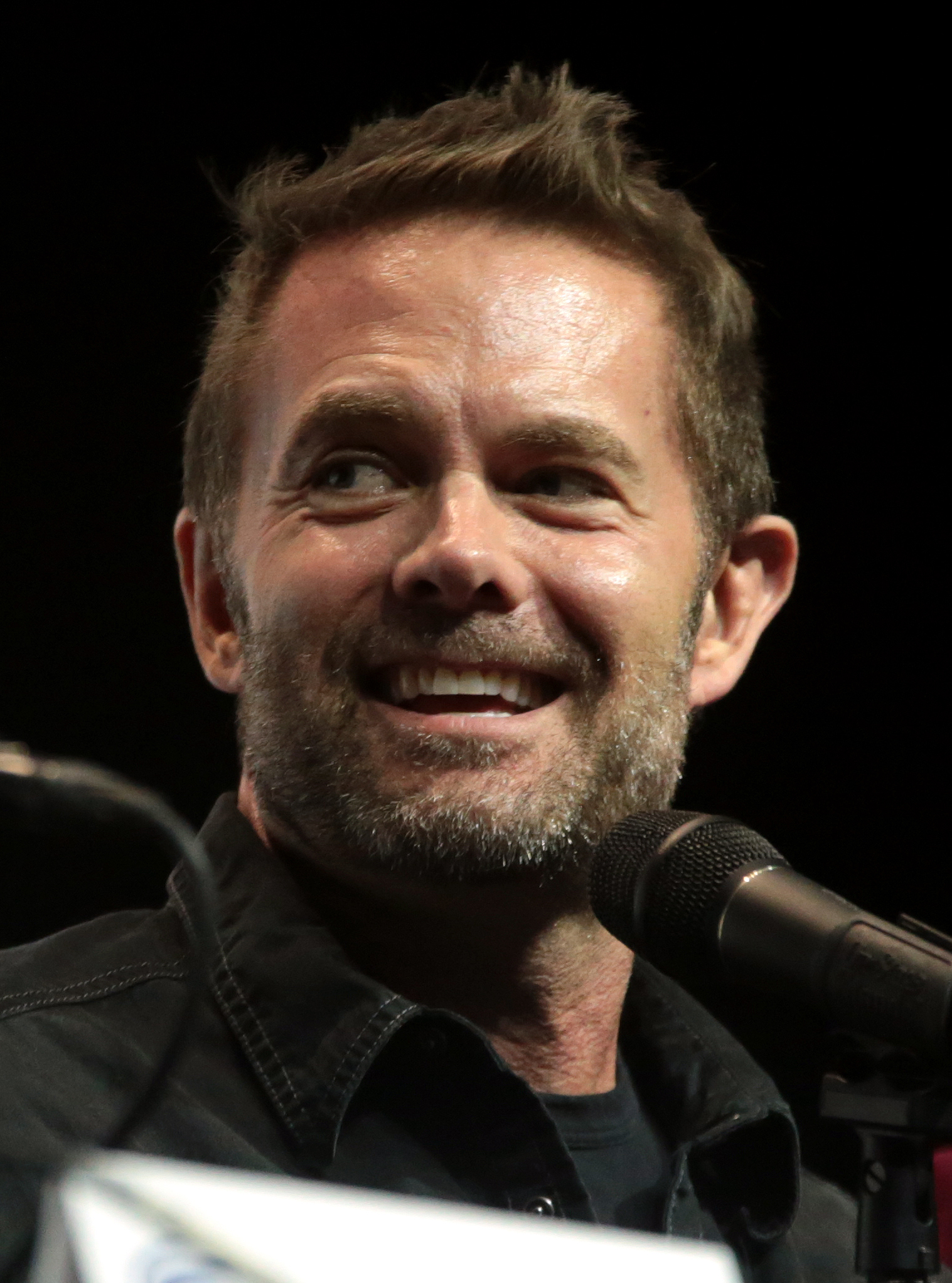
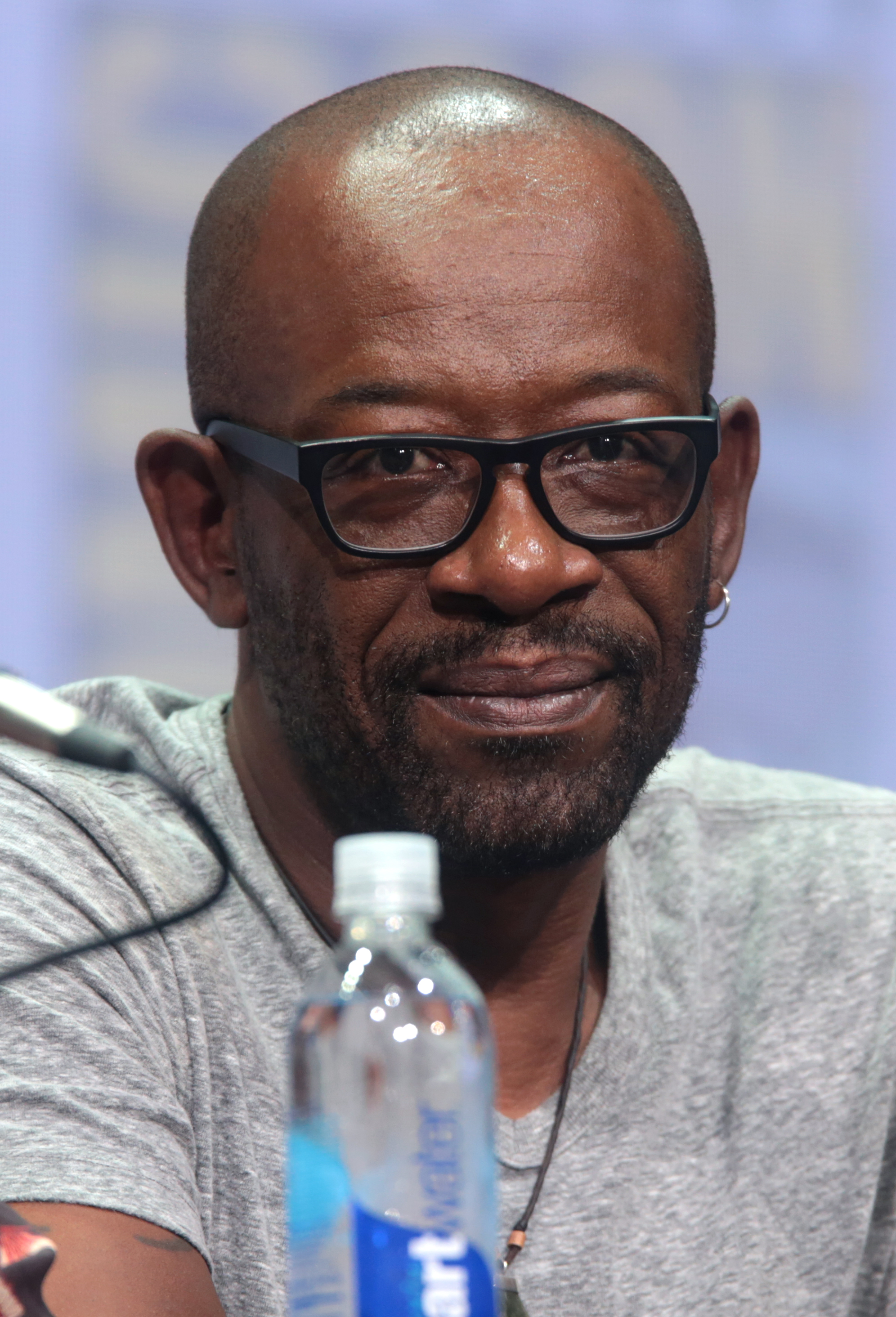
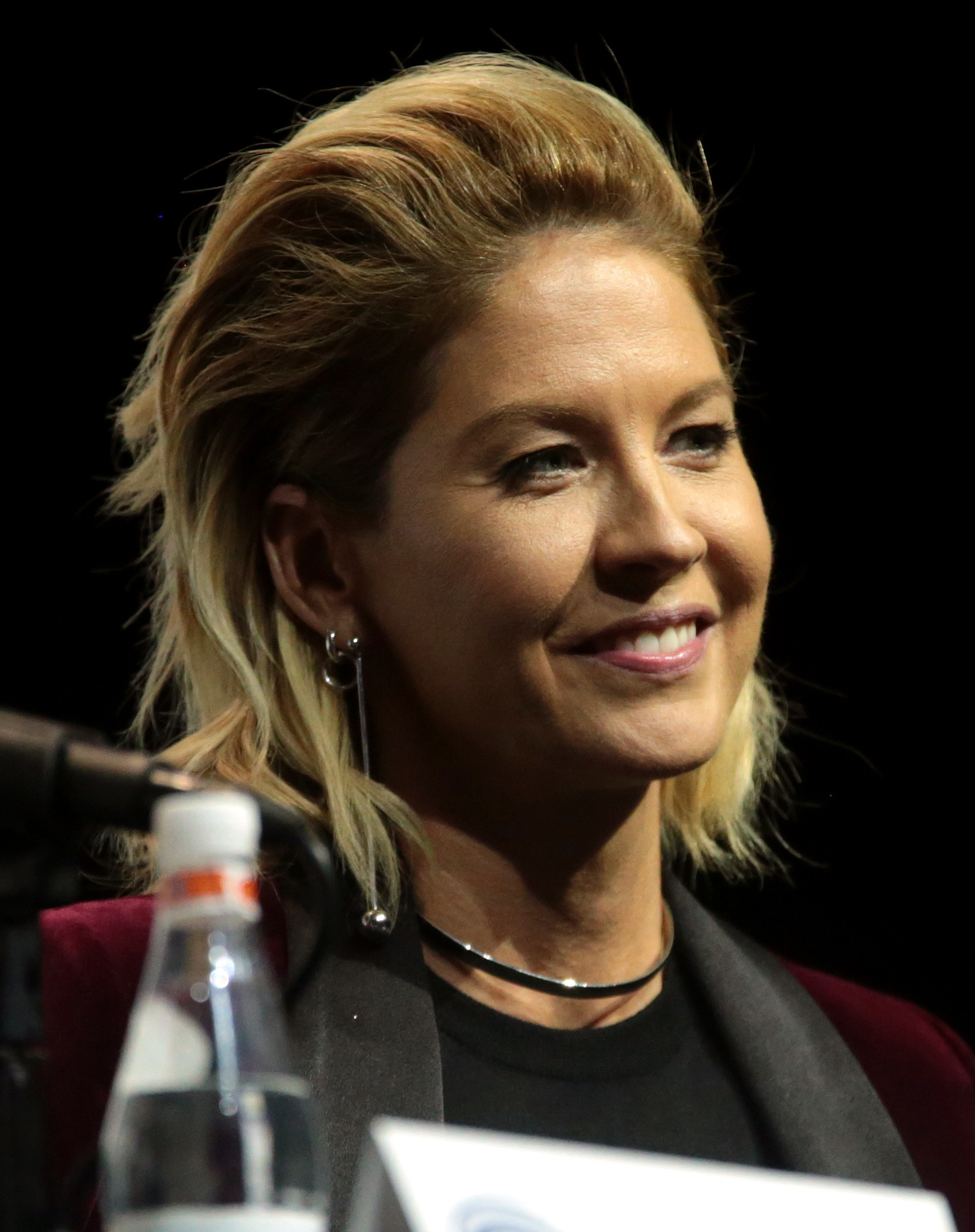
Garret Dillahunt (John Dorie), Lennie James (Morgan Jones), and Jenna Elfman (June)

=== Main cast ===
The fourth season features nine actors receiving main cast billing status, with five returning from the third season, while four new cast members are introduced. Lennie James (who was a main cast member in The Walking Dead), moved to the main cast after his departure from The Walking Dead. Maggie Grace, Garret Dillahunt and Jenna Elfman were added to the main cast. This is the first season not to include Cliff Curtis, Mercedes Mason, Daniel Sharman, Sam Underwood, Dayton Callie, Rubén Blades and Lisandra Tena (since their first appearances), who were all credited as main cast members in previous seasons.

- Kim Dickens as Madison Clark: An intelligent and domineering high school guidance counselor and the mother of Nick and Alicia.
- Frank Dillane as Nick Clark: A brave and selfless recovering heroin addict, Madison's son, and Alicia's brother.
- Alycia Debnam-Carey as Alicia Clark: The fiery yet compassionate daughter of Madison, and the sister of Nick.
- Maggie Grace as Althea "Al" Szewczyk-Przygocki: A curious and tactical journalist who encounters Morgan and John.
- Colman Domingo as Victor Strand: A smart and sophisticated conman-turned-businessman, who forms friendships with Nick and Madison.
- Danay García as Luciana Galvez: A strong and cautious former member of the La Colonia community in Tijuana, Mexico, and Nick's girlfriend.
- Garret Dillahunt as John Dorie: A lonesome and friendly police officer whom Morgan encounters.
- Lennie James as Morgan Jones: A mentally unstable and ruthlessly pragmatic man, formerly a part of Rick Grimes' group on The Walking Dead, who encounters the core group of survivors.
- Jenna Elfman as June "Naomi/Laura": A kind and mysterious nurse whom Madison encounters.

=== Supporting cast ===
- Kevin Zegers as Melvin: The antagonistic leader of the Vultures and the brother of Ennis.
- Evan Gamble as Ennis: A member of the Vultures and the brother of Melvin.
- Sebastian Sozzi as Cole: A resident of the community within the baseball stadium.
- Rhoda Griffis as Vivian: A resident of the community within the baseball stadium and the wife of Douglas.
- Alexa Nisenson as Charlie: A young girl who is a spy for the Vultures.
- Kenneth Wayne Bradley as Douglas: A resident of the community within the baseball stadium and the husband of Vivian.
- Aaron Stanford as Jim Brauer: A survivor who brews for a living.
- Daryl Mitchell as Wendell: The adoptive brother of Sarah who uses a wheelchair.
- Mo Collins as Sarah: The adoptive sister of Wendell and a former Marine.
- Tonya Pinkins as Martha: A mysterious antagonistic woman who kills every survivor that tries to help someone else.

=== Guest cast ===
- Andrew Lincoln as Rick Grimes: The main protagonist of The Walking Dead, Morgan's friend, and the leader of Alexandria, a Safe-Zone in Virginia.
- Melissa McBride as Carol Peletier: Morgan's friend from Virginia who resides in the Kingdom.
- Tom Payne as Paul "Jesus" Rovia: Morgan's friend from Virginia who resides in the Hilltop.
- Clint James as Leland: The antagonistic leader of a group who has a history with Althea.
- Stephen Henderson as Clayton "Polar Bear": A truck driver who left supplies for other survivors.

== Episodes ==
No. overall	No. in season	Title	Directed by	Written by	Original release date	U.S. viewers (millions)
38	1	"What's Your Story?"	John Polson	Scott M. Gimple & Andrew Chambliss & Ian Goldberg	April 15, 2018	4.09
Morgan Jones leaves his community in Virginia, despite being urged to stay by his various friends, including Rick Grimes. Morgan makes his way to the Texas border where he meets a man named John Dorie. The next day, Morgan and John are held captive by a group of survivors, but they are saved by a woman named Althea, who drives a SWAT vehicle. Althea tells Morgan and John that she is a journalist and wants to get their stories on camera. John tells Althea that he is on a mission to find his girlfriend, Laura. Morgan eventually opens up and tells Althea about his past in Atlanta and Virginia. The group stops their vehicle when they see a woman crawling on the ground, which turns out to be Alicia. Morgan, John and Althea are then surrounded at gunpoint by Nick, Strand, and Luciana.
39	2	"Another Day in the Diamond"	Michael E. Satrazemis	Andrew Chambliss & Ian Goldberg	April 22, 2018	3.07
Madison, Nick, Alicia, Strand, and Luciana are a part of a community living in a baseball stadium. Nick is farming vegetables, but weevils are destroying them. Madison and others, excluding Nick, set out to find Charlie's family, a young girl in the community. Madison's group reaches a deserted town and they split up to search. Madison and Alicia find a burned down camp near giant oil tanks, which has a white flag with the number "457". Madison comes across a woman named Naomi and Madison invites her to their community. At night, a large convoy of trucks approach the stadium. Mel, the leader of a group known as the Vultures, rounds up walkers outside the stadium and into a truck; it is then labeled "12". Madison goes out to talk with Mel, and he tells Madison he knows of their weevil problem, thanks to Charlie who is revealed as a spy. Mel orders Madison to give them all their supplies or they will die from their lack of resources. Madison refuses and walks away. Catching up to the events of the previous episode: Luciana finds a flag marked "51" in Althea's SWAT truck, and Alicia orders them to take them to where they found the flag.
40	3	"Good Out Here"	Dan Liu	Shintaro Shimosawa	April 29, 2018	2.71
In flashbacks, Nick and Madison go on a supply run, however when they arrive, they discover that Mel's brother Ennis has already looted it. Charlie eavesdropped on Madison and obtained the location, giving it to Ennis. Nick pleads with Charlie to not listen to the Vultures. Nick then attacks Ennis with his knife, but Madison stops him from killing Ennis. Charlie goes with Ennis in his blue El Camino and they drive off. In the present, the SWAT vehicle swerves off the road and crashes after a commotion inside the vehicle between the two groups. Nick spots the blue El Camino and chases after it. The others find a service station which has a truck with wire cable, that they can use to tow the SWAT vehicle from the mud. Returning to the SWAT truck, they fight off various infected and successfully tow it. Nick finds Ennis at a farm and they fight inside a silo. Nick impales Ennis on a deer antler display, killing him. Nick is then shot by Charlie. The rest of the group arrives, where they try to revive him, but he dies. Alicia sobs and is left devastated.
41	4	"Buried"	Magnus Martens	Alex Delyle	May 6, 2018	2.49
Alicia, Strand, and Luciana tell Althea their stories about how they ended up in their current situation, which led to Nick's death. In flashbacks, various groups go on supply runs; Strand and Cole search a nursery for plants; Nick and Luciana search a library; and Alicia and Naomi go to a water park. At the library, there is no food, but Nick insists on finding books because he argues people need more than just food. At the water park, Alicia and Naomi find various medical supplies and a machine gun. Strand shows Cole a secret car that is filled with supplies just for himself. At the stadium, Madison tells Mel she is willing to build a community together, but Mel scoffs at the idea. Nick suggests to Madison they should venture farther north to find seeds and fertilizer to bring back, instead of moving to a new location. In the present, the group tells Althea that they should have left the stadium. They stop the SWAT van, where they dig up a cache of weapons—to kill the Vultures with. The group then buries Nick. John recognizes a backpack, which belongs to Naomi, revealing that she is Laura. Alicia tells John that Laura died at the stadium. Everyone leaves in the van, except Morgan and John, who go off alone.
42	5	"Laura"	Michael E. Satrazemis	Anna Fishko	May 13, 2018	2.46
In flashbacks, John finds Naomi unconscious in the water outside his cabin. John brings her inside, dresses her wound and lets her rest. Because she refuses to tell her name, John calls her Laura. John notices that more infected have been washing up on the creek surrounding his cabin, so he and Naomi canoe upstream to discover a broken guardrail on a bridge. They then patch the guardrail with a piece of metal. During the night, Naomi reveals to John that she lost a child. The next day, John teaches Naomi how to fish and they play Scrabble. The infected have still been floating downstream, so they investigate the bridge again. This time, they block the gap with a Jeep. During a scuffle with the infected, John refuses to use his pistols, but instead stabs them. He explains his refusal to use firearms is because of an incident from when he was a police officer. The infected eventually knock the Jeep into the river and float towards John's cabin. John and Naomi fight off the infected, where John uses his weapons to save Naomi. Later, John tells Naomi he loves her and they kiss. The next day, John discovers Naomi has left, but leaves a note with Scrabble tiles: "I love you too I'm sorry."
43	6	"Just in Case"	Daisy von Scherler Mayer	Richard Naing	May 20, 2018	2.31
In flashbacks, Madison and Strand join Naomi on a supply run to a FEMA shelter that may have seeds and fertilizer. They rest for the night at a motel, but when Madison wakes in the morning, she discovers Naomi is missing. Naomi goes to the shelter, which is filled with infected, and retrieves a set of keys marked "JIC." She is eventually surrounded by infected and takes refuge at the top of scaffolding. Madison and Strand arrive and are able to save her. Naomi explains that she and her daughter, Rose, had stayed at the shelter. When Rose caught pneumonia, she left to find antibiotics. But when she returned, she discovered that Rose had died, turned and infected everyone else. Naomi then takes Madison and Strand to a truck stocked with supplies. They return to the stadium with plants and fertilizer, and the Vultures decide to vacate the parking lot. In the present, Alicia, Strand and Luciana face off with Mel and the Vultures at the meeting spot. Morgan and John are also present. A woman pulls up in a vehicle, revealed to be Naomi. Alicia then shoots at Naomi but accidentally hits John when he steps in the way.
44	7	"The Wrong Side of Where You Are Now"	Sarah Boyd	Melissa Scrivner Love	June 3, 2018	1.97
In the present, the two groups engage in gunfire. Naomi tries to get medical supplies for John from the ambulance, but Mel drives off in it. Alicia fires at the ambulance with a grenade launcher and accuses Naomi of betraying her trust. Althea rides up in her SWAT vehicle, where Naomi and Morgan carry John inside, and Charlie joins them at Morgan's request. Alicia finds Mel crawling from the ambulance and asks him how long Naomi had been colluding with them. He does not answer and Alicia then stabs him. In flashbacks, Charlie goes to the stadium and asks Madison if she can help Mel, who is injured from a car accident. Charlie claims she and Mel have left the Vultures after a fight with Ennis. Mel tells Madison that Ennis is planning on destroying the stadium. After patching up Mel, Madison gives him a truck with supplies and forces him to leave by himself. Charlie begs the others to bring back Mel. Alicia and Nick leave the stadium to find Mel. Ennis and the Vultures arrive at the stadium and unleash several trucks filled with the Infected. Back in the present, everyone in the SWAT vehicle arrives at the stadium, revealed to be filled with the Infected.
45	8	"No One's Gone"	Michael E. Satrazemis	Ian Goldberg & Andrew Chambliss	June 10, 2018	2.32
Sometime after the destruction of the Gonzalez Dam, Madison meets Althea, whom she tries to rob without success. Madison eventually gives her a story from when her children were little and explains how she is trying to protect their innocence. Upon their departure, Althea gives Madison food, a radio and a map, allowing her to find her children. Althea's kindness inspires Madison to form the stadium community, but Althea never learns Madison's name. In the present, Naomi and Morgan struggle to get supplies to save John's life while Althea and Charlie deal with an attack from Alicia's group. The subsequent revelation that Althea met Madison and Morgan's intervention convinces Alicia to stop her path of vengeance. At night, Alicia's group finishes telling their story about the fall of the stadium, including how everyone else died when they tried to flee and were overrun. Madison is revealed to have led the Infected into the stadium to contain the herd and give her children, Strand and Luciana a chance to survive. Madison ultimately sets the herd ablaze within the stadium, sacrificing herself to save the others. In honor of Madison's memory, Althea names the story after her and the group shares the same noodles she gave to Madison when they first met.
46	9	"People Like Us"	Magnus Martens	Anna Fishko	August 12, 2018	1.88
Morgan decides to return to Virginia with the help of Althea, and asks the other members of the group to go with him. John, still recovering from his gunshot wound, intends on staying in Texas and returning to his cabin with June and Charlie (the three are currently living in a school bus). Meanwhile, Strand, Luciana and Alicia are living in a mansion. Strand spends most of his days intoxicated, Luciana is severely depressed, and Alicia is off on her own; none of them are interested in joining Morgan on his trip. Morgan helps Alicia, who is following a path of notes labeled "HELP", to someone who is possibly in need. The two kill more Infected and reach the source of the notes, but the person has already turned. Disheartened, Alicia separates from Morgan and goes off on her own. Charlie flees the school bus, and John goes to Strand to ask for help in finding her. June confesses to Althea that she's scared John won't love her, because John fell in love with "Laura". Luciana catches Charlie in the mansion (who is returning a book that Nick had given her), but she runs off as a fierce storm begins to develop.
47	10	"Close Your Eyes"	Michael E. Satrazemis	Shintaro Shimosawa	August 19, 2018	1.86
Alicia takes refuge in a house to escape the storm. She kills the dead Infected family and puts their bodies outside. She hears an intruder in the house, which is Charlie, who locks herself in an upstairs bedroom. Alicia guilts Charlie about killing Nick, telling her she'll have to live with it for the rest of her life, which brings Charlie to tears. Alicia orders Charlie to help her hammer the window shutters closed, but stops once the noise begins to attract more Infected. Back inside, Alicia discovers Charlie has a gun, which Alicia keeps. The two eat dinner, and Charlie asks Alicia many questions about her past. The storm begins to intensify and a window shatters. They flee to the basement, which has flooded, and debris collapses on the basement door, trapping them. They try to escape through the exterior doors, but it's locked from the outside. Believing they will soon drown, Charlie begs Alicia to kill her so she will not turn like her parents did. Alicia contemplates it, but refuses. Suddenly, an Infected impaled on a tree branch above falls and breaks the lock, allowing them to escape. They drive to the mansion to look for Strand and Luciana, but the house is empty and in ruins. They also discover John and June's bus overturned on the bridge, and Alicia wonders if they are all dead.
48	11	"The Code"	Tara Nicole Weyr	Andrew Chambliss & Alex Delyle	August 26, 2018	1.83
Morgan takes refuge from the storm inside a semi-truck and takes supplies from a box labelled with "Take what you need. Leave what you don't". After falling asleep inside the truck, he wakes up to discover he is at a gas station in Mississippi. Inside the gas station, Morgan hears a woman's voice on the radio transmitter who tells him to take any supplies he needs. Morgan is then approached by a man named Wendell, who uses a wheelchair, with a shotgun and his adopted sister Sarah. Wendell and Sarah explain that they are the ones leaving the supplies for other survivors. Morgan starts driving back to Texas to search for his friends, but decides to turn around. On his way back, Morgan saves a man, Jim, who is being attacked by the Infected. Jim tells Morgan he was kidnapped. Morgan and Jim meet up with Wendell and Sarah, and Jim recognizes Sarah as his kidnapper. Morgan and Jim are then held captive by them. Wendell and Sarah want the location of Morgan's community in Virginia. Jim cuts a deal with Wendell and Sarah, and they leave Morgan, who is trapped by a herd of Infected. After escaping, Morgan rejoins the group in their truck and they agree to save Morgan's friends in Texas in exchange for the location of his community in Virginia. The mysterious woman hears Morgan's message on the radio, and tells an Infected impaled to wall, that they're going to Texas.
49	12	"Weak"	Colman Domingo	Kalinda Vazquez	September 2, 2018	1.52
Running low on fuel, June and Althea camp inside the SWAT truck over the next few days. They hear a static-filled transmission over the radio and go to higher ground for a better signal. Morgan, who is traveling with Sarah, Wendell and Jim, tries to make contact with the others by revealing his location via the walkie, but there is no response. Althea begins to feel weak due to lack of water and food. June and Althea find an abandoned truck and begin driving. They then see the SWAT truck drive past them, and they chase it. Althea comes down with a fever, and tells June there is antibiotics in her truck. June goes by herself to track down the truck, and retrieves it after an altercation with Quinn, the man who stole it. However, the truck is out of fuel. June cannot find the medicine, and Althea reveals over the radio that there wasn't any; she just wanted the truck back with her videotapes. June luckily finds medicine in an overturned bus near the truck. Morgan unknowingly encounters the mysterious woman at a supply box, and after he leaves, she replaces the bottles of clean water with dirty water. At higher ground, Morgan obtains a signal and gives his location. June and Althea hear the message and reunite with Morgan. Quinn, who has found fuel, is attacked and killed by Purvis, the Infected companion of the mysterious woman. She leaves Purvis behind and watches Quinn reanimate.
50	13	"Blackjack"	Sharat Raju	Ian Goldberg & Richard Naing	September 9, 2018	1.71
The mysterious woman contacts Morgan and others over the walkie and Morgan recognizes her voice. She warns them to stop helping people, as it makes them weak. Strand and John are marooned and the surrounding water has an alligator in it. Luciana comes across Clayton, an older man who is mortally wounded and trapped in his car from the storm. His last wish is to have a beer, so Luciana sets off in search of one. John and Strand assemble a raft using a camper shell from a truck. John uses the horn to lure Infected to the water to distract the alligator as they begin to cross. However, the horn dies and the alligator attacks their raft, causing a leak. John fires at it and they swim back. Luciana discovers a supply box left by Morgan and finds a beer inside (from Jim, who is a brewer). The box is also marked with Morgan's radio channel. Luciana returns to Clayton with the beer, and he tells her he was a truck driver and has notebooks with descriptions of locations where he left supplies. He later dies. Luciana reunites with Morgan and the others after contacting his radio channel. Morgan is then contacted by Charlie and Alicia on the radio, but is interrupted by the mysterious woman, who is driving Althea's SWAT truck. She approaches the semi-truck with everyone inside and opens fire with the SWAT truck's guns.
51	14	"MM 54"	Lou Diamond Phillips	Anna Fishko & Shintaro Shimosawa	September 16, 2018	1.87
In a flashback, the mysterious woman, Martha, is forced to kill her husband after he turns. After burying him, she begins to lose her mind, mumbling to herself. Martha begins to kill various survivors who are leaving the supply boxes at mile markers. In the present, Martha attacks the semi-truck with the SWAT guns. After running out of ammo, Martha flees in the SWAT truck, but not before being wounded by a gunshot from Wendell. Morgan and everyone escape the semi-truck and it explodes from leaking fuel. The noise attracts a herd of Infected and the group goes to a nearby hospital. As the herd enters the hospital, the group goes to the top floor and they split into groups to barricade the other stairwells. Believing the barricades won't hold, the group goes to the roof via the elevator, minus Althea who went on her own to start the generator to fix the elevator. On the roof, June checks on Jim's injuries and discovers he has been bitten by an Infected. Meanwhile, Alicia and Charlie continue their trek and come across a lake where they find John Dorie's hat.
52	15	"I Lose People..."	David Barrett	Kalinda Vazquez	September 23, 2018	2.03
Alicia and Charlie find Strand and John, but they're stranded on the opposite side of the lake. While searching for a boat, they are attacked by gunfire from Martha, but she then falls unconscious due to her prior gunshot wound. Eventually, Alicia and Charlie find and use the SWAT vehicle to cross the lake and rescue Strand and John, with Martha tied up in the back. With no way of escaping from the roof and the streets below overrun with Infected, Morgan leads the group back to the generator room to search for Althea, where they find a note about her escape plan by using the freight elevator. The group escapes the hospital via the freight elevator, but Morgan stays behind to cause a distraction to clear their escape route. Morgan goes back to the roof and tosses an Infected corpse over, landing on a car and setting off its alarm. However, he is still stuck on the roof with a dying Jim. Alicia's group joins up with the others after getting their location over the walkie. They use a fire truck ladder to get Morgan off the roof. With little time left before he succumbs to his bite wound, Jim leaps from the roof onto a vehicle to set off its alarm and draw the Infected away from the others. Everyone gets inside the SWAT truck and realize Martha has vanished. Morgan suggests they find Althea and head to Virginia. That night back at the hospital, Martha watches Jim reanimate and takes him to go after Morgan.
53	16	"... I Lose Myself"	Michael E. Satrazemis	Andrew Chambliss & Ian Goldberg	September 30, 2018	2.13
Althea manages to escape from the hospital but is knocked out by Martha and a zombified Jim. Martha uses her to deliver a video message to the group in which she vows to make Morgan strong. While the rest of the group retreats back to the truck stop before heading to Alexandria, Morgan sets out to look for Martha and help her overcome her issues with helping people. He finds her at her husband's grave along with the Infected Jim who Morgan sadly puts down. Morgan plans to bring Martha with him to the truck stop, but she causes him to crash his car after he receives a distress call from the others, who have been poisoned with antifreeze in the water bottles. After nearly reverting to his old self and killing her, Morgan sets out on foot to get within reach of the truck stop to let the others know by what they have been poisoned. With Martha dying of blood loss and a raging infection from her prior untreated gunshot wound, Morgan handcuffs her to a car door so that she can't harm anyone when she turns. While their truckload of ethanol, the antidote, goes to waste due to bullet holes, Morgan arrives in time with a supply of Jim's beer to save everyone. He then returns to Martha and finds she has turned, so he puts her down. The group decides not to go to Alexandria and instead continue the Polar Bear's work. Operating out of a denim factory, they set out to create a network helping lost people and to turn the factory into something special, mimicking Madison's plans for the stadium.

== Production and writing ==
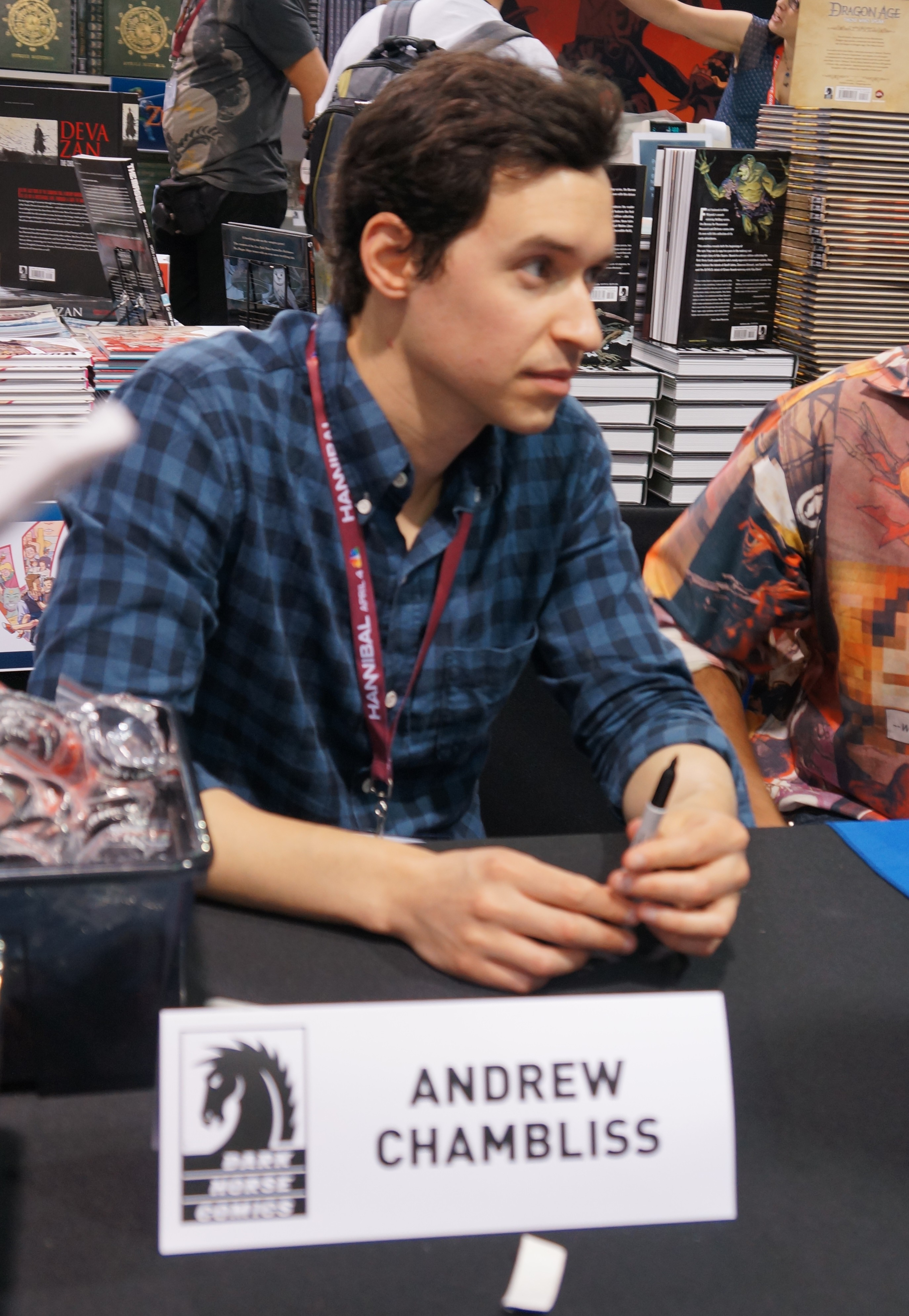
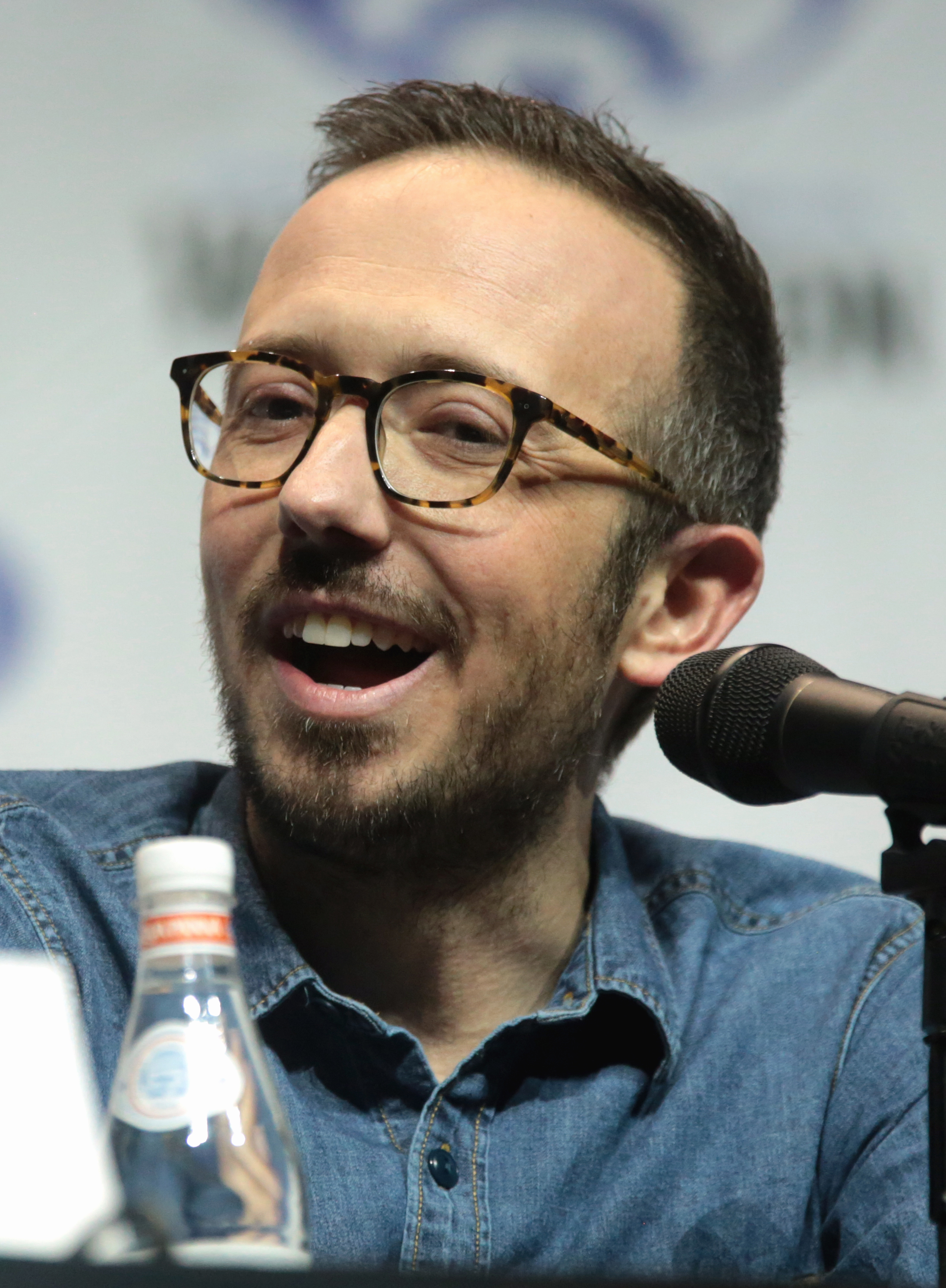
New showrunners Andrew Chambliss (left) and Ian B. Goldberg (right).

On April 14, 2017, AMC renewed the series for a 16-episode fourth season and announced that Andrew Chambliss and Ian Goldberg would replace the departing Dave Erickson as showrunners. Production began in November 2017 in Austin, Texas. Michael E. Satrazemis, a director of photography for The Walking Dead and director of 12 episodes, joined Fear the Walking Dead as a directing-producer.

In November 2017, it was reported that Lennie James who portrays Morgan Jones on The Walking Dead would crossover and join the main cast in the fourth season. The fourth season also sees the additions of several new series regulars, played by Garret Dillahunt, Jenna Elfman, and Maggie Grace.

On April 21, 2018, Colman Domingo revealed that he would be directing the twelfth episode of this season.

The fourth season features a redesigned title sequence with new theme music. Each episode of the season has a different title card, and tells a story which will become apparent once the season is completed. The Hollywood Reporter reflected on the new intro, calling the new season, "a Western with zombies, very much by design."

Goldberg spoke of the season's narrative structure, which features multiple timelines:

"We're playing with the structure, depending on which story we're telling in the episode. What we find so exciting about telling stories across time is it allows for mystery and for finding characters in an emotional place and exploring how they came to be that way, and finding them in a very different emotional place in the flashback storyline — not only from a plot perspective of piecing it together, but also showing how people became who they are by charting them in the present and comparing it to where they've been in the past."

The new showrunners also were inspired by Westerns; Chambliss stated, "It all started with the themes we set out at the beginning: isolation and community. Those themes run through a lot of classic Western stories." Visually, the season is inspired by John Ford and Sergio Leone's Westerns, using Once Upon a Time in the West as a template for directors. Chambliss said, "it's all about having wide shots, not moving the characters, but moving the characters within the frame. When we get to the editing room, it's really about slowing down the cutting pattern, and harkening back to that style of filmmaking. It does infuse the show with a different feel than what we've seen before. It's something that we're very excited for people to see."

The third episode of the season features the death of Nick Clark, played by Frank Dillane. In an interview after the episode had aired, Dillane revealed he asked to leave the show prior to the fourth season. The actor explained:

"I had been doing it for three or four years, the show has undergone many changes in terms of different people in charge, all of this stuff, and I just felt like the beginning of this season kind of felt like the end of an era with this show. And television is hard work, and you have to shoot a lot. I also missed Europe very much. I'm not American, so after a while I get quite homesick and all of those things. I also felt like we had achieved what needed to be achieved in the first few seasons, so I thought it was time to keep moving."

== Release ==
On March 15, 2018, it was announced that the season premiere and the season eight finale of The Walking Dead would be screened at AMC, Regal, and Cinemark theaters across the United States on April 15, the same day as the televised airing, for "Survival Sunday: The Walking Dead & Fear the Walking Dead". The episodes marked the first crossover between the two series. The cinema screening also included an extra half-hour of exclusive bonus content.

== Reception ==
=== Critical response ===
On Rotten Tomatoes, the fourth season has an approval rating of 80% based on 165 reviews, with an average rating of 6.85/10. The site's critical consensus is, "Fear the Walking Dead shuffles onward confidently in its fourth season with a bevy of horrifying set-pieces and heartbreaking twists, but some viewers may be dispirited by the series' constant reshuffling of its characters." TVLine reevaluated the series for its fourth season, giving it a "B+" grade. Reviewer Charlie Mason wrote, "it's gone from being an adequate stopgap between seasons of The Walking Dead to a show that's as good or arguably even better than the one from which it was spun off." He also praised the addition of Jenna Elfman and Garret Dillahunt and that season 4 has had several genuine surprises in its storytelling.

However, the decision to kill off lead character Madison Clark, portrayed by Kim Dickens, was met with intense criticism. Writing for The Hollywood Reporter, television critic Maureen Ryan highlighted the character as "one of TV's — and cable's — rare mature female leads" and cited her "baffling" demise as an example of Hollywood's ageist practices, adding, "the fact that this decision comes from The Walking Dead franchise, which has come under fire for its treatment of women and people of color in the past, is even more depressing."

Fear the Walking Dead season 4: Critical reception by episode
Season 4 (2018): Percentage of positive critics' reviews tracked by the website Rotten Tomatoes

=== Ratings ===
Viewership and ratings per episode of Fear the Walking Dead season 4
No.	Title	Air date	Rating (18–49)	Viewers (millions)	DVR (18–49)	DVR viewers (millions)	Total (18–49)	Total viewers (millions)
1	"What's Your Story?"	April 15, 2018	1.6	4.09	0.9	2.01	2.5	6.11
2	"Another Day in the Diamond"	April 22, 2018	1.1	3.07	0.5	1.18	1.6	4.25 (Note: Live +7 ratings were not available, so Live +3 ratings have been used instead.)
3	"Good Out Here"	April 29, 2018	1.0	2.71	0.6	1.50	1.6	4.21
4	"Buried"	May 6, 2018	0.9	2.49	—N/a	—N/a	—N/a	—N/a
5	"Laura"	May 13, 2018	0.9	2.46	0.6	1.47	1.5	3.94
6	"Just in Case"	May 20, 2018	0.8	2.31	—N/a	—N/a	—N/a	—N/a
7	"The Wrong Side of Where You Are Now"	June 3, 2018	0.6	1.97	0.5	1.19	1.1	3.16
8	"No One's Gone"	June 10, 2018	0.7	2.32	0.6	1.52	1.3	3.85
9	"People Like Us"	August 12, 2018	0.7	1.88	0.4	0.96	1.0	2.84
10	"Close Your Eyes"	August 19, 2018	0.6	1.86	0.5	1.15	1.1	3.01
11	"The Code"	August 26, 2018	0.6	1.83	0.4	0.99	1.0	2.82
12	"Weak"	September 2, 2018	0.5	1.52	0.4	1.24	0.9	2.76
13	"Blackjack"	September 9, 2018	0.6	1.72	0.5	1.26	1.1	2.98
14	"MM 54"	September 16, 2018	0.6	1.87	0.5	1.30	1.1	3.17
15	"I Lose People..."	September 23, 2018	0.7	2.03	0.3	0.93	1.0	2.97
16	"... I Lose Myself"	September 30, 2018	0.7	2.13	0.4	1.02	1.1	3.15
