= ... I Lose Myself =

- Fear the Walking Dead episode
- Episode no.: Season 4 Episode 16
- Directed by: Michael E. Satrazemis
- Written by: Andrew Chambliss; Ian Goldberg
- Original air date: September 30, 2018
- Running time: 44 minutes

Guest appearances
- Tonya Pinkins as Martha; Aaron Stanford as Jim Brauer; Daryl Mitchell as Wendell Rabinowitz; Mo Collins as Sarah Rabinowitz; Alexa Nisenson as Charlie

Episode chronology
← Previous "I Lose People..."	Next → "Here to Help"
- Fear the Walking Dead (season 4)

"... I Lose Myself" is the sixteenth and final episode of the fourth season of the post-apocalyptic horror television series Fear the Walking Dead, which aired on AMC on September 30, 2018, in the United States. The episode was written by Andrew Chambliss and Ian Goldberg, and directed by Michael E. Satrazemis.

== Plot ==
Althea manages to escape from the hospital but is knocked out by Martha and a zombified Jim. Martha uses her to deliver a video message to the group in which she vows to make Morgan strong. While the rest of the group retreats to the truck stop before heading to Alexandria, Morgan sets out to look for Martha and help her overcome her issues with helping people. He finds her at her husband's grave along with the Infected Jim who Morgan sadly puts down. Morgan plans to bring Martha with him to the truck stop, but she causes him to crash his car after he receives a distress call from the others, who have been poisoned with antifreeze in the water bottles. After nearly reverting to his old self and killing her, Morgan sets out on foot to get within reach of the truck stop to let the others know by what they have been poisoned. With Martha dying of blood loss and a raging infection from her prior untreated gunshot wound, Morgan handcuffs her to a car door so that she cannot harm anyone when she turns. While their truckload of ethanol, the antidote, goes to waste due to bullet holes, Morgan arrives in time with a supply of Jim's beer to save everyone. He then returns to Martha and finds she has turned, so he puts her down. The group decides not to go to Alexandria and instead continue the Polar Bear's work. Operating out of a denim factory, they set out to create a network to help lost people and to turn the factory into something, mimicking Madison's plans for the stadium.

== Reception ==
The episode received mixed reviews. Den of Geek rated "... I Lose Myself" 1.5 out of 5 stars. Dino-Ray Ramos of Deadline Hollywood called the episode "a hopeful end to a rough season". Similarly, Forbes' Erik Kain said the episode was "a lackluster ending to a bad season". Matt Fowler of IGN gave the episode a rating of 6.4 out of 10. On Rotten Tomatoes, "... I Lose Myself" garnered a 67% rating with an average score of 4.7/10 based on 9 reviews.

=== Ratings ===
The episode was seen by 2.13 million viewers in the United States on its original air date, above the previous episodes ratings of 2.03 million viewers.
