= MM 54 =

- Fear the Walking Dead episode
- Episode no.: Season 4 Episode 14
- Directed by: Lou Diamond Phillips
- Written by: Anna Fishko; Shintaro Shimosawa
- Original air date: September 16, 2018
- Running time: 44 minutes

Guest appearances
- Tonya Pinkins as Martha; Aaron Stanford as Jim Brauer; Daryl Mitchell as Wendell Rabinowitz; Mo Collins as Sarah Rabinowitz; Alexa Nisenson as Charlie

Episode chronology
← Previous "Blackjack"	Next → "I Lose People..."
- Fear the Walking Dead (season 4)

"MM 54" is the fourteenth episode of the fourth season of the post-apocalyptic horror television series Fear the Walking Dead, which aired on AMC on September 16, 2018 in the United States.

== Plot ==
=== Teaser ===
In a flashback, the mysterious woman, Martha, is forced to kill her husband after he turns. After burying him, she begins to lose her mind, mumbling to herself. Martha begins to kill various survivors who are leaving the supply boxes at mile markers.

=== Main plot ===
In the present, Martha attacks the semi-truck with the SWAT guns. After running out of ammo, Martha flees in the SWAT truck, but not before being wounded by a gunshot from Wendell. Morgan and everyone escape the semi-truck and it explodes from leaking fuel. The noise attracts a herd of Infected and the group goes to a nearby hospital. As the herd enters the hospital, the group goes to the top floor and they split into groups to barricade the other stairwells. Believing the barricades won't hold, the group goes to the roof via the elevator, minus Althea who went on her own to start the generator to fix the elevator. On the roof, June checks on Jim's injuries and discovers he has been implausibly bitten by an Infected. Meanwhile, Alicia and Charlie continue their trek and come across a lake where they find John Dorie's hat.

== Reception ==
"MM 54" received mixed from critics. On Rotten Tomatoes, "MM 54" garnered a 63% rating with an average score of 7.8/10 based on 8 reviews.

=== Ratings ===
The episode was seen by 1.87 million viewers in the United States on its original air date, below the previous episodes ratings of 1.71 million viewers.
