= Blackjack (Fear the Walking Dead) =

- Fear the Walking Dead episode
- Episode no.: Season 4 Episode 13
- Directed by: Sharat Raju
- Written by: Ian Goldberg; Richard Naing
- Original air date: September 9, 2018
- Running time: 44 minutes

Guest appearances
- Stephen Henderson as Clayton "Polar Bear"; Tonya Pinkins as Martha; Aaron Stanford as Jim Brauer; Daryl Mitchell as Wendell Rabinowitz; Mo Collins as Sarah Rabinowitz; Alexa Nisenson as Charlie

Episode chronology
← Previous "Weak"	Next → "MM 54"
- Fear the Walking Dead (season 4)

"Blackjack" is the thirteenth episode of the fourth season of the post-apocalyptic horror television series Fear the Walking Dead, which aired on AMC on September 9, 2018 in the United States.

== Plot ==
The mysterious woman contacts Morgan and others over the walkie and Morgan recognizes her voice. She warns them to stop helping people, as it makes them weak. Strand and John are marooned and the surrounding waters has an alligator in it. Luciana comes across Clayton, an older man who is mortally wounded and trapped in his car from the storm. His last wish is to have a beer, so Luciana sets off in search of one. John and Strand assemble a raft using a camper shell from a truck. John uses the horn to lure Infected to the water to distract the alligator as they begin to cross. However, the horn dies and the alligator attacks their raft, causing a leak. John fires at it and they swim back. Luciana discovers a supply box left by Morgan and finds a beer inside (from Jim, who is a brewer). The box is also marked with Morgan's radio channel. Luciana returns to Clayton with the beer, and he tells her he was a truck driver and has notebooks with descriptions of locations where he left supplies. He later dies. Luciana reunites with Morgan and the others after contacting his radio channel. Morgan is then contacted by Charlie and Alicia on the radio, but is interrupted by the mysterious woman, who is driving Althea's SWAT truck. She approaches the semi-truck with everyone inside and opens fire with the SWAT truck's guns.

== Reception ==
"Blackjack" received somewhat positive from critics. On Rotten Tomatoes, "Blackjack" garnered a 71% rating with an average score of 8/10 based on 7 reviews.

=== Ratings ===
The episode was seen by 1.71 million viewers in the United States on its original air date, above the previous episodes ratings of 1.52 million viewers.
