= I Lose People... =

- Fear the Walking Dead episode
- Episode no.: Season 4 Episode 15
- Directed by: David Barrett
- Written by: Kalinda Vazquez
- Original air date: September 23, 2018
- Running time: 44 minutes

Guest appearances
- Tonya Pinkins as Martha; Aaron Stanford as Jim Brauer; Daryl Mitchell as Wendell Rabinowitz; Mo Collins as Sarah Rabinowitz; Alexa Nisenson as Charlie

Episode chronology
| ← Previous "MM 54" | Next → "... I Lose Myself" |
- Fear the Walking Dead (season 4)

"I Lose People..." is the fifteenth and penultimate episode of the fourth season of the post-apocalyptic horror television series Fear the Walking Dead, which aired on AMC on September 23, 2018 in the United States.

== Plot ==
Alicia and Charlie find Strand and John, but they're stranded on the opposite side of the lake. While searching for a boat, they are attacked by gunfire from Martha, but she then falls unconscious due to her prior gunshot wound. Eventually, Alicia and Charlie find and use the SWAT vehicle to cross the lake and rescue Strand and John, with Martha tied up in the back. With no way of escaping from the roof and the streets below overrun with Infected, Morgan leads the group back to the generator room to search for Althea, where they find a note about her escape plan by using the freight elevator. The group escapes the hospital via the freight elevator, but Morgan stays behind to cause a distraction to clear their escape route. Morgan goes back to the roof and tosses an Infected corpse over, landing on a car and setting off its alarm. However, he is still stuck on the roof with a dying Jim. Alicia's group joins up with the others after getting their location over the walkie. They use a fire truck ladder to get Morgan off the roof. With little time left before he succumbs to his bite wound, Jim leaps from the roof onto a vehicle to set off its alarm and draw the Infected away from the others. Everyone gets inside the SWAT truck and realizes Martha has vanished. Morgan suggests they find Althea and head to Virginia. That night back at the hospital, Martha watches Jim reanimate and takes him to go after Morgan.

== Reception ==
The episode received mixed reviews. Den of Geek rated the episode 3 out of 5 stars. On Rotten Tomatoes, "I Lose People..." garnered a 50% rating with an average score of 6.67/10 based on 8 reviews.

=== Ratings ===
The episode was seen by 2.03 million viewers in the United States on its original air date, above the previous episodes ratings of 1.87 million viewers.
