= Ner Tamid (Fear the Walking Dead) =

- Fear the Walking Dead episode
- Episode no.: Season 5 Episode 12
- Directed by: Michael E. Satrazemis
- Written by: Andrew Chambliss; Ian Goldberg
- Original air date: September 1, 2019
- Running time: 41 minutes

Guest appearances
- Matt Frewer as Logan; Mo Collins as Sarah Rabinowitz; Peter Jacobson as Jacob Kessner

Episode chronology
← Previous "You're Still Here"	Next → "Leave What You Don't"
- Fear the Walking Dead (season 5)

"Ner Tamid" (Hebrew for "Eternal Light"), is the twelfth episode of the fifth season of the post-apocalyptic horror television series Fear the Walking Dead, which aired on AMC on September 1, 2019. The episode was written by Andrew Chambliss and Ian Goldberg, and directed by Michael E. Satrazemis.

== Plot ==
Disappointed that she hasn't found a new shelter yet, Charlie runs away from the group and ends up in a synagogue. There she is saved by Rabbi Jacob Kessner, who offers her an inn for the night. After shaking hands while repairing a light, Charlie thinks they can reinforce the chapel and create a new safe area for the group.

John and June arrive, who say it won't work because it is too small and lacks a water supply. Charlie has to abandon the idea when the walkers invade and destroy the temple, forcing everyone to flee.

Meanwhile, some members of Logan's crew discover the location of the caravan and chase after Sarah and Dwight, who are in the oil truck. They eventually run out of fuel, but Logan's group surprisingly leaves without conflict. Sarah is relieved, but Dwight wonders if it was a setup. Elsewhere, Logan arrives at the oil fields, having discovered the location through the Althea tapes.

== Reception ==
"Ner Tamid" received negative reviews. It currently holds a 36% negative rating with an average score of 4.75/10 out of 14 on the review aggregator Rotten Tomatoes. The critics' consensus reads: "Meandering and stocked with credulity-straining moments, 'Ner Tamid' keeps the season's narrative momentum frustratingly stuck in neutral -- although it finds some grace notes in a nuanced depiction of Judaism."

In his review, Liam Mathews of TV Guide wrote: "Every episode of Fear the Walking Dead has one thing you never thought you'd see." However, Erik Kain of Forbes was negative about the episode and wrote: "It's all contrived. You could probably boil down the entire 12 episodes we've seen so far into two and not lose anything."

=== Rating ===
The episode was seen by 1.14 million viewers in the United States on its original air date, below the previous episodes.
