= Andrew Chambliss =

American screenwriter (born 1981)

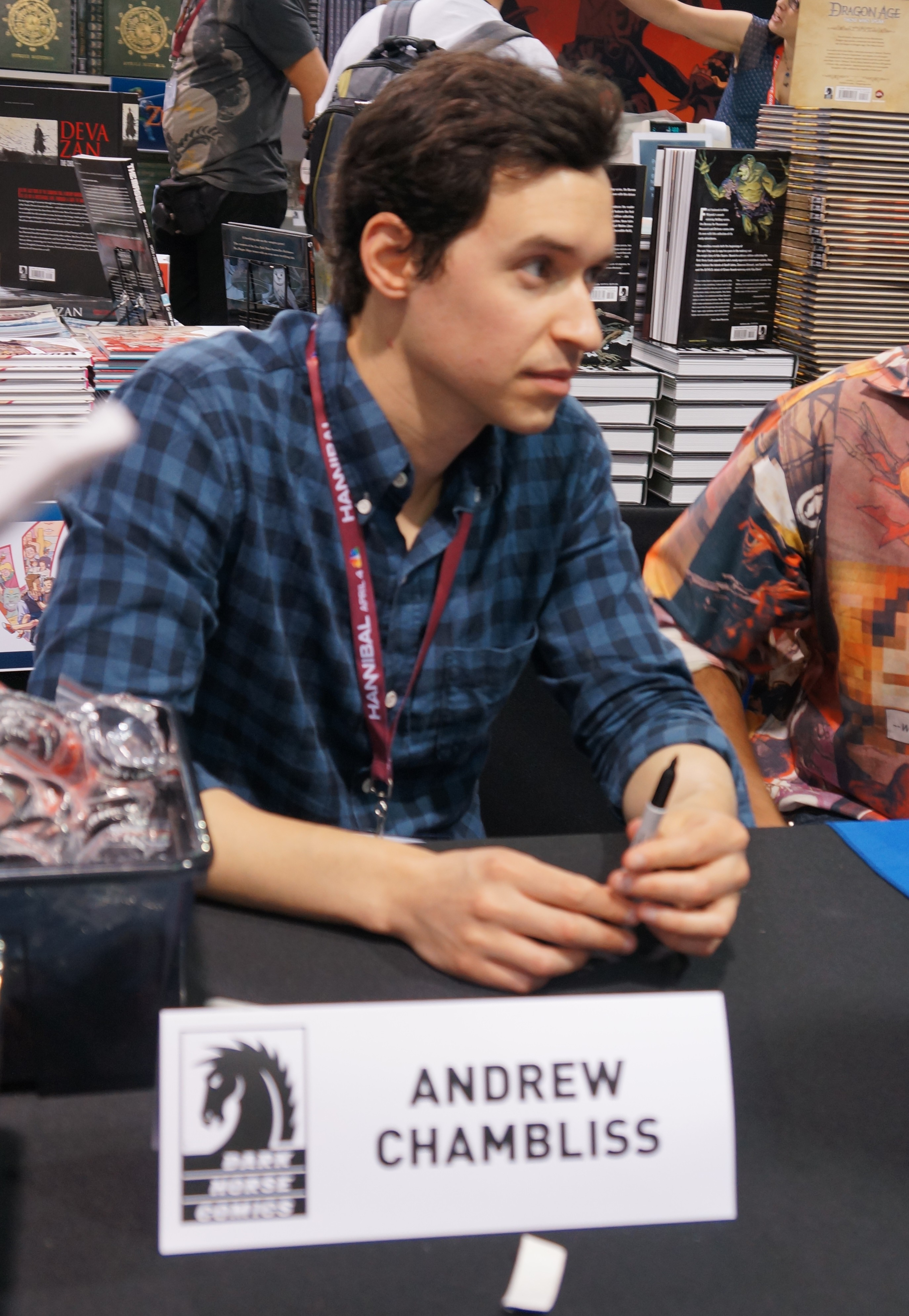
- Born: August 25, 1981 (age 45); United States
- Occupations: Writer, producer
- Years active: 2007–present
- Spouse: Clare Mukherjee (m. 2013)

Andrew Chambliss is an American television writer and producer.

He is well known for working on series such as Dollhouse, The Vampire Diaries, and was an executive producer on Once Upon a Time. He was the executive producer and showrunner of AMC’s Fear the Walking Dead alongside Ian B. Goldberg.

== Career ==
Chambliss began his career working as an assistant to the executive producers on Crossing Jordan and Heroes, after which he worked as a story editor on the short-lived 2007 remake of The Bionic Woman.

In 2009 he joined the writing staff of Joss Whedon's philosophical science-fiction series Dollhouse. His first script was the ninth episode of the first season, "A Spy in the House of Love". He continued to work on the show as a writer and story editor through the show's second season, for which he wrote four episodes, including the series finale.

After the cancellation of Dollhouse, he wrote an episode of the Starz historical epic Spartacus: Blood and Sand before joining the staff of The Vampire Diaries on The CW.

Chambliss is the main writer of the ninth season of Buffy the Vampire Slayer. He said in an interview with Hero Complex, "'Buffy' is such a huge part of what made me want to become a writer, especially in television".

In summer 2011, Chambliss joined the ABC fantasy series Once Upon a Time as a writer and co-producer.

=== Television credits ===
==== Dollhouse ====
- "A Spy in the House of Love" (1.09)
- "The Public Eye" (2.05)
- "Meet Jane Doe" (2.07) (co-written with Maurissa Tancharoen & Jed Whedon)
- "Stop-Loss" (2.09)
- "Epitaph Two: Return" (2.13) (co-written with Maurissa Tancharoen & Jed Whedon)

==== Spartacus: Blood and Sand ====
- "Delicate Things" (1.06) (co-written with Tracy Bellomo)

==== The Vampire Diaries ====
- "There Goes the Neighborhood" (1.16) (co-written with Bryan Oh)
- "Under Control" (1.18) (co-written with Barbie Kligman)
- "Founder's Day" (1.22) (co-written with Bryan Oh)
- "Bad Moon Rising" (2.03)
- "Katerina" (2.09)
- "The Dinner Party" (2.15)
- "The Last Day" (2.20) (co-written with Brian Young)

==== Once Upon a Time ====
- "The Shepherd" (1.06) (co-written with co-producer Ian Goldberg)
- "Fruit of the Poisonous Tree" (1.11) (co-written with Goldberg)
- "Heart of Darkness" (1.16) (co-written with Goldberg)
- "The Stranger" (1.20) (co-written with Goldberg)
- "Lady of the Lake" (2.03) (co-written with Goldberg)
- "Child of the Moon" (2.07) (co-written with Goldberg)
- "The Outsider" (2.11) (co-written with Goldberg)
- "Welcome to Storybrooke" (2.17) (co-written with Goldberg)
- "Second Star to the Right" (2.21) (co-written with Goldberg)
- "Lost Girl" (3.02) (co-written with Kalinda Vazquez)
- "Dark Hollow" (3.07) (co-written with Vazquez)
- "The New Neverland" (3.10)
- "It's Not Easy Being Green" (3.16)
- "Kansas" (3.20) (co-written with Vazquez)
- "The Apprentice" (4.04) (co-written with Dana Horgan)
- "Family Business" (4.06) (co-written with Vasquez)
- "Unforgiven" (4.13) (co-written with Vasquez)
- "Poor Unfortunate Soul" (4.15) (co-written with Horgan)
- "Lily" (4.19) (co-written with Horgan)
- "The Price" (5.02) (co-written with Horgan)
- "The Bear and the Bow" (5.06) (co-written with Tze Chun)
- "The Bear King" (5.09)
- "Labor of Love" (5.13) (co-written with Horgan)
- "Ruby Slippers" (5.18) (co-written with Bill Wolkoff)
- "Only You" (5.22) (co-written with David H. Goodman)
- "A Bitter Draught" (6.02) (co-written with Horgan)
- "Dark Waters" (6.06) (co-written with Brigitte Hales)
- "Ill-Boding Patterns" (6.13) (co-written with Horgan)
- "Awake" (6.17) (co-written with Leah Fong)
- "The Song in Your Heart" (6.20) (co-written with Goodman)

==== Fear the Walking Dead ====
On April 14, 2017, Andrew Chambliss and Ian B. Goldberg were announced as joint showrunners for the 4th season of Fear the Walking Dead

=== Season 4 ===
- "What's Your Story?" (4.01) (co-written with Goldberg and Scott M. Gimple)
- "Another Day in the Diamond" (4.02) (co-written with Goldberg)
- "No One's Gone" (4.08) (co-written with Goldberg)
- "The Code" (4.11) (co-written with Alex Delyle)
- "I Lose People..." (4.16) (co-written with Goldberg)

=== Season 5 ===
- "Here to Help" (5.01) (co-written with Goldberg)
- "The End of Everything" (5.05) (co-written with Goldberg)
- "210 Words Per Minute" (5.10) (co-written with Goldberg)
- "Ner Tamid" (5.12) (co-written with Goldberg)
- "End of the Line" (5.16) (co-written with Goldberg)

=== Season 6 ===
- "The End Is the Beginning" (6.01) (co-written with Goldberg)
- "The Door" (6.08) (co-written with Goldberg)
- "In Dreams" (6.12) (co-written with Goldberg and Nazrin Choudhury)
- "The Beginning" (6.16) (co-written with Goldberg)

=== Season 7 ===
- "The Beacon" (7.01) (co-written with Goldberg)
- "Six Hours" (7.02) (co-written with Goldberg)
- "PADRE" (7.08) (co-written with Goldberg)
- "Follow Me" (7.09) (co-written with Goldberg)
- "Amina" (7.15) (co-written with Goldberg)
- "Gone" (7.16) (co-written with Goldberg)

=== Season 8 ===
- "Remember What They Took from You" (8.01) (co-written with Goldberg)
- "Blue Jay" (8.02) (co-written with Goldberg)
- "Odessa" (8.03) (co-written with Goldberg)
- "King County" (8.04) (co-written with Goldberg)
- "All I See Is Red" (8.06) (co-written with Goldberg)
- "The Road Ahead" (8.12) (co-written with Goldberg)

=== Comics credits ===
==== Dollhouse ====
- Dollhouse #1-5, Dark Horse, 2011

==== Buffy The Vampire Slayer ====
- Buffy The Vampire Slayer: Season 9 #1-13, #16-25, Dark Horse, 2011-2013
