= Ian B. Goldberg =

American television and film writer

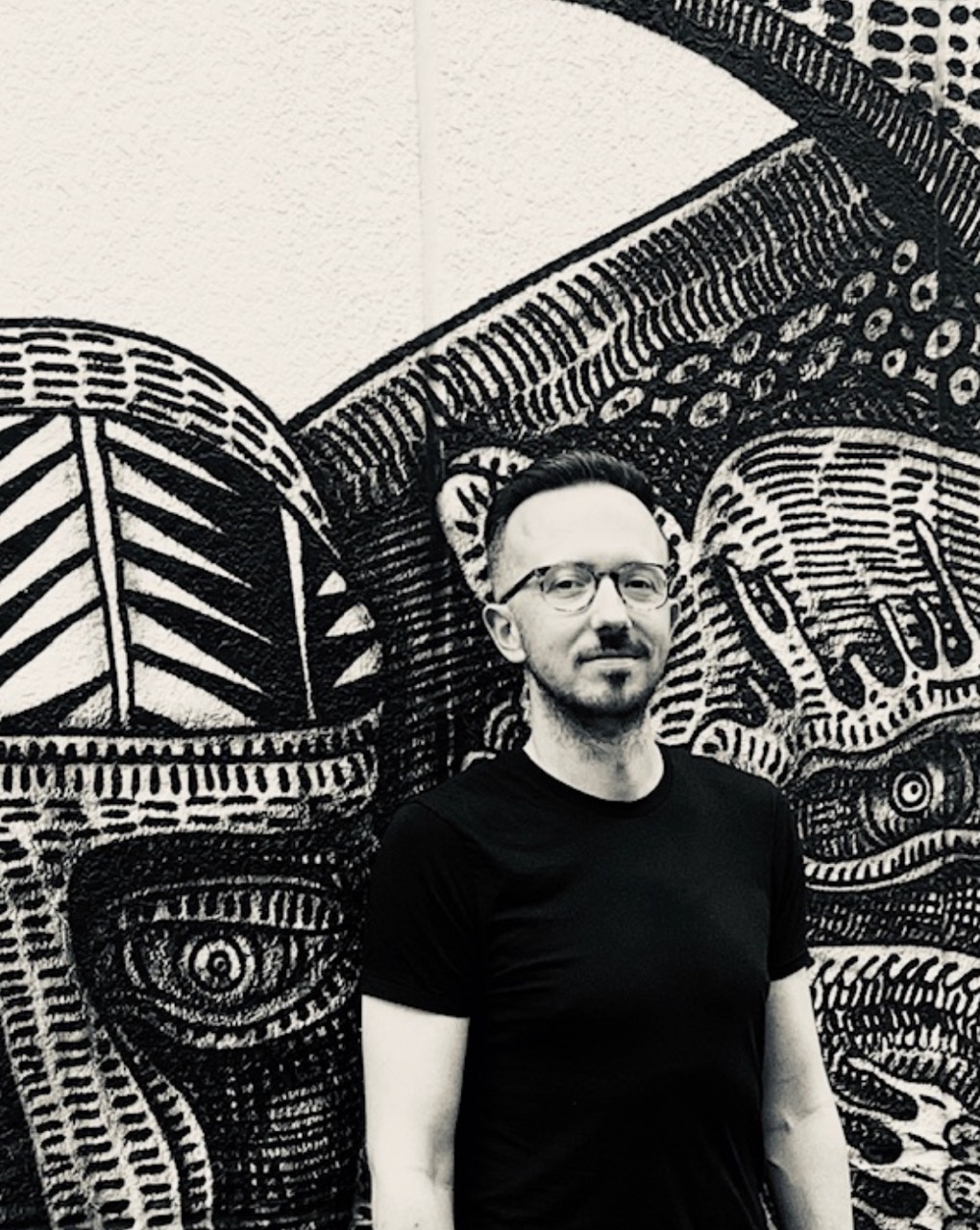
- Goldberg in 2019
- Occupations: Film writer, television writer, television producer, showrunner
- Years active: 2005–present

Ian B. Goldberg is an American television and film writer, as well as a producer and showrunner.

He is known for writing the films The Autopsy of Jane Doe (2016) and Eli (2019), as well as serving as co-showrunner – along with Andrew Chambliss – and writer of AMC's Fear the Walking Dead. He also co-created the television shows Krypton for the SyFy Network and Dead of Summer for Freeform.

== Career ==
=== Television ===
Goldberg began his Hollywood career in 2005 working on The WB series Related, starring Jennifer Esposito and Lizzy Caplan. He wrote the episode "Driving Miss Crazy".

In 2008, he joined the Fox science-fiction series Terminator: The Sarah Connor Chronicles, as staff writer. He wrote four episodes for the show, before its cancellation in 2009.

Goldberg was a story editor and writer of two episodes, on the ABC drama FlashForward, for its first and only season.

He was an executive story editor and writer on the CBS drama Criminal Minds: Suspect Behavior, a spin-off from Criminal Minds. He wrote three episodes before its cancellation in May 2011.

The writer joined in 2011 the ABC fantasy/drama Once Upon a Time, writing for and co-producing the show, which ran for seven years.

Episodes Goldberg contributed to Once Upon a Time include:

- "The Shepherd" (1.06) (co-written with co-producer Andrew Chambliss)
- "Fruit of the Poisonous Tree" (1.11) (co-written with Chambliss)
- "Heart of Darkness" (1.16) (co-written with Chambliss)
- "The Stranger" (1.20) (co-written with Chambliss)
- "Lady of the Lake" (2.03) (co-written by Chambliss)

In 2014, Goldberg and David S. Goyer, wrote a pilot script for a Superman-origin story called Krypton. The Warner Horizon Television and DC Comics television show, premiered on March 21, 2018 and ran for two seasons on the Syfy network.

Goldberg, along with Edward Kitsis and Adam Horowitz, also created Dead of Summer, a 10-episode thriller about a haunted summer camp that debuted on Freeform on June 28, 2016.

On April 14, 2017, Goldberg and Andrew Chambliss were announced as joint showrunners for the 4th season of Fear the Walking Dead. He continued in that position for Season 5.

==== Season 4 ====
- "What's Your Story?" (4.01) (co-written with Chambliss and Scott M. Gimple)
- "Another Day in the Diamond" (4.02) (co-written with Chambliss)
- "No One's Gone" (4.08) (co-written with Chambliss)
- "Blackjack" (4.13) (co-written with Richard Naing)
- "... I Lose Myself" (4.16) (co-written with Chambliss)

==== Season 5 ====
- "Here to Help" (5.01) (co-written with Chambliss)
- "The End of Everything" (5.05) (co-written with Chambliss)
- "210 Words Per Minute" (5.10) (co-written with Chambliss)
- "Ner Tamid" (5.12) (co-written with Chambliss)
- "End of the Line" (5.16) (co-written with Chambliss)

==== Season 6 ====
- "The End Is the Beginning" (6.01) (co-written with Chambliss)
- "The Door" (6.08) (co-written with Chambliss)
- "In Dreams" (6.12) (co-written with Chambliss and Nazrin Choudhury)
- "The Beginning" (6.16) (co-written with Chambliss)

==== Season 7 ====
- "The Beacon" (7.01) (co-written with Chambliss)
- "Six Hours" (7.02) (co-written with Chambliss)
- "PADRE" (7.08) (co-written with Chambliss)
- "Follow Me" (7.09) (co-written with Chambliss)
- "Amina" (7.15) (co-written with Chambliss)
- "Gone" (7.16) (co-written with Chambliss)

==== Season 8 ====
- "Remember What They Took from You" (8.01) (co-written with Chambliss)
- "Blue Jay" (8.02) (co-written with Chambliss)
- "Odessa" (8.03) (co-written with Chambliss)
- "King County" (8.04) (co-written with Chambliss)
- "All I See Is Red" (8.06) (co-written with Chambliss)
- "The Road Ahead" (8.12) (co-written with Chambliss)

In September 2025, Apple TV+ renewed its Foundation series for a fourth season with Goldberg and David Kob as showrunners.

=== Film ===
In December 2013, Goldberg and Richard Naing's screenplay, The Autopsy of Jane Doe, landed on the 2013 Black List, an annual list compiling Hollywood's Hottest Unproduced Scripts.

In October 2015, New Line Cinema tapped Goldberg and his The Autopsy of Jane Doe writing partner Richard Naing, to write the film The Boy Who Drew Monsters. The film is based on the 2014 book by Keith Donohue.

Goldberg and Richard Naing wrote the screenplay for the 2016 IFC Films release, The Autopsy of Jane Doe, the André Øvredal film that grossed nearly $6 million at the box office. The movie obtained an 86% rating on Rotten Tomatoes.

Author Stephen King said of The Autopsy of Jane Doe that as "visceral horror, this terror tale rivals Alien and early Cronenberg. Watch it, but not alone."

In October 2019, Netflix began streaming the Paramount Players film Eli, directed by Ciarán Foy, with a script by Goldberg, Naing, and David Chirchirillo.

== Filmography ==
Film

Year	Title	Notes	Ref
2016	The Autopsy of Jane Doe		
2019	Eli		
2023	The Nun II		
2025	The Conjuring: Last Rites		
2027	The Conjuring: First Communion	Post-production	
