= Fear the Walking Dead =

American post-apocalyptic drama television series

- Title card for the first three seasons
- Genre: Horror; Drama; Zombie apocalypse
- Created by: Robert Kirkman; Dave Erickson
- Based on: The Walking Dead by: Robert Kirkman; Tony Moore; Charlie Adlard
- Showrunners: Dave Erickson (seasons 1–3); Andrew Chambliss (seasons 4–8); Ian Goldberg (seasons 4–8)
- Starring: Kim Dickens; Cliff Curtis; Frank Dillane; Alycia Debnam-Carey; Elizabeth Rodriguez; Mercedes Mason; Lorenzo James Henrie; Rubén Blades; Colman Domingo; Michelle Ang; Danay García; Daniel Sharman; Sam Underwood; Dayton Callie; Lisandra Tena; Maggie Grace; Garret Dillahunt; Lennie James; Jenna Elfman; Alexa Nisenson; Karen David; Austin Amelio; Mo Collins; Colby Hollman; Zoe Colletti; Christine Evangelista; Keith Carradine
- Theme music composer: Atticus Ross
- Composers: Paul Haslinger; Danny Bensi; Saunder Jurriaans
- Country of origin: United States
- Original language: English
- No. of seasons: 8
- No. of episodes: 113 (list of episodes)

Production
- Executive producers: Robert Kirkman; David Alpert; Greg Nicotero; Gale Anne Hurd; Dave Erickson; Scott M. Gimple; Andrew Chambliss; Ian Goldberg; Michael E. Satrazemis
- Producers: Bill Johnson; Avram Butch Kaplan; Alan Page; Pablo Cruz; Arturo Sampson; Colman Domingo
- Production locations: Los Angeles, California; Vancouver, British Columbia; Rosarito, Baja California; Round Rock, Texas; Austin, Texas; New Braunfels, Texas; Savannah, Georgia
- Cinematography: Michael McDonough; Patrick Cady; Christopher Manley
- Editors: Todd Desrosiers; Victor DuBois; Marc Clark; Tad Dennis; Enrique Sanchez
- Running time: 43–65 minutes
- Production companies: Square Head Pictures; Circle of Confusion; Skybound Entertainment; Valhalla Entertainment; AMC Studios

Original release
- Network: AMC
- Release: August 23, 2015 – November 19, 2023

Related
- The Walking Dead (franchise); Talking Dead

Fear the Walking Dead is an American post-apocalyptic horror drama television series created by Robert Kirkman and Dave Erickson for AMC. It is a spin-off to The Walking Dead, which is based on the comic book series of the same name by Kirkman, Tony Moore, and Charlie Adlard. It is also the second television series within The Walking Dead franchise. The first three seasons serve as a prequel, focusing on a blended family who experience the start of the zombie apocalypse. Subsequent seasons run concurrently to the original show, with Morgan Jones (Lennie James) from The Walking Dead crossing over into the series.

The series features a large ensemble cast, originally led by Kim Dickens as Madison Clark, Cliff Curtis as Travis Manawa, Frank Dillane as Nick Clark, and Alycia Debnam-Carey as Alicia Clark. Following a soft reboot with its fourth season, the series was led by Lennie James as Morgan Jones. Other series regulars have included Colman Domingo, Mercedes Mason, Rubén Blades, Danay García, Maggie Grace, Garret Dillahunt, Jenna Elfman, Alexa Nisenson, Karen David, Austin Amelio, Mo Collins, and Christine Evangelista.

Fear the Walking Dead premiered on August 23, 2015. Andrew Chambliss and Ian Goldberg served as the showrunners for the fourth to eighth season, succeeding Erickson from the first three. The series concluded on November 19, 2023, after eight seasons and 113 episodes. Initially set in Los Angeles, filming for the series took place in Los Angeles, Texas, Vancouver, Canada, Mexico, and Georgia.

== Premise ==
Set in Los Angeles, California, and later in Mexico, the first three seasons of Fear the Walking Dead follow a dysfunctional, blended family composed of high school counselor Madison Clark, her English teacher fiancé Travis Manawa, her daughter Alicia, her drug addict son Nick, Travis's son from a previous marriage, Chris, Chris's mother Liza Ortiz, and others who join their group at the onset of the zombie apocalypse. They must reinvent themselves, learning new skills and adopting new attitudes in order to survive as civilization collapses around them.

Beginning in the fourth season, the series shifts focus toward Morgan Jones, a character from the original series, who encounters the group's surviving members and new survivors in Texas.

== Cast and characters ==
=== Main ===
- Kim Dickens as Madison Clark: An intelligent and domineering guidance counselor, the mother of Nick and Alicia, and Travis's fiancée. (seasons 1–4 and 8; guest season 7)
- Cliff Curtis as Travis Manawa: A resolute and peacekeeping high school teacher, Madison's fiancé, Chris's father, and Liza's ex-husband. (seasons 1–3)
- Frank Dillane as Nicholas "Nick" Clark: A brave recovering heroin addict, Madison's son, and Alicia's brother. (seasons 1–4)
- Alycia Debnam-Carey as Alicia Clark: The fiery yet compassionate daughter of Madison, and Nick's sister. (seasons 1–7; special guest star season 8)
- Elizabeth Rodriguez as Elizabeth "Liza" Ortiz: A no-nonsense and caring nursing student, Travis's ex-wife, and Chris's mother. (season 1; guest season 2)
- Mercedes Mason as Ofelia Salazar: The strong-willed and capable daughter of Daniel and his wife Griselda. (seasons 1–3)
- Lorenzo James Henrie as Christopher "Chris" Manawa: Travis and Liza's rebellious teenage son, who becomes more brutal due to the landscape of the deadly new world. (seasons 1–2)
- Rubén Blades as Daniel Salazar: A courageous and pragmatic former Sombra Negra member, a barber, Griselda's husband, and Ofelia's father. (seasons 1–3 and 5–8)
- Colman Domingo as Victor Strand: A smart and sophisticated conman-turned-businessman, who forms friendships with Madison's group. (seasons 2–8; guest season 1)
- Michelle Ang as Alex: A pragmatic and quiet survivor introduced in the Fear the Walking Dead: Flight 462 web series. (season 2)
- Danay García as Luciana Galvez: A strong and cautious former member of the La Colonia community in Tijuana, Mexico, and Nick's girlfriend. (seasons 3–8; recurring season 2)
- Daniel Sharman as Troy Otto: The charismatic and impulsive son of Jeremiah, and Jake's half-brother. (seasons 3 and 8)
- Sam Underwood as Jeremiah "Jake" Otto Jr.: Jeremiah's moralistic and wiser son, Troy's half-brother, and Alicia's love interest. (season 3)
- Dayton Callie as Jeremiah Otto Sr.: The racist and candid leader of Broke Jaw Ranch, and Jake and Troy's father. (season 3; guest season 2)
- Lisandra Tena as Lola Guerrero: The empathetic leader of the Gonzalez Dam community, who is responsible for supplying water to the local population. (season 3)
- Maggie Grace as Althea "Al" Szewczyk-Przygocki: A curious and tactical journalist who encounters Morgan and John. (seasons 4–6; guest season 7)
- Garret Dillahunt as John Dorie: A lonesome and friendly police officer whom Morgan encounters in Texas. (seasons 4–6)
- Lennie James as Morgan Jones: A lonely and pragmatic man, formerly a part of Rick Grimes' group on The Walking Dead, who encounters the core group of survivors and leads a pacifist agenda. (seasons 4–8)
- Jenna Elfman as June "Naomi / Laura" Dorie: A kind and mysterious nurse encountered by Madison who has a history with John. (seasons 4–8)
- Alexa Nisenson as Charlie: A young girl who acts as a spy for the Vultures until she defects to Morgan's group. (seasons 5–7; recurring season 4; guest season 8)
- Karen David as Grace Mukherjee: A former worker at a nuclear power plant that began melting down who encounters Morgan's group. (seasons 5–8)
- Austin Amelio as Dwight: A ruthless and reluctant former lieutenant of the Saviors, who was exiled from Virginia by Rick's group on The Walking Dead and has travelled to Texas hoping to reunite with his ex-wife. (seasons 5–8)
- Mo Collins as Sarah Rabinowitz: The adoptive sister of Wendell and a former U.S. Marine. (seasons 6–7; recurring seasons 4–5)
- Colby Hollman as Wes: A nihilistic painter who allies with Morgan's group. (seasons 6–7; recurring season 5)
- Zoe Colletti as Dakota: A rebellious member of the Pioneers and Virginia's daughter. (season 6)
- Christine Evangelista as Sherry: Dwight's long-missing ex-wife who fled across the country to Texas after escaping the Saviors on The Walking Dead. (seasons 6–8)
- Keith Carradine as John Dorie Sr.: John's estranged father and a retired police officer. (seasons 6–7)

=== Recurring ===
==== Introduced in season 1 ====
- Patricia Reyes Spíndola as Griselda Salazar: Ofelia's mother, who emigrated from El Salvador with her husband Daniel to escape political unrest. (season 1; guest season 2)
- Shawn Hatosy as Cpl. Andrew Adams: A well-intentioned member of the U.S. military, who is out of his element. (season 1)
- Sandrine Holt as Dr. Bethany Exner: A confident and skilled doctor working with the U.S. military. (season 1)

==== Introduced in season 2 ====
- Daniel Zovatto as Jack Kipling: A member of a group of pirates who develops an attraction to Alicia. (season 2)
- Arturo Del Puerto as Luis Flores: An ally and right-hand man of Victor Strand and Thomas Abigail. (season 2)
- Marlene Forte as Celia Flores: Luis's mother and Thomas's adoptive mother who is the leader of a community of survivors at the Abigail estate. (season 2)
- Paul Calderón as Alejandro Nuñez: A former pharmacist and the leader of La Colonia, a community in Tijuana, Mexico, who claims to have been bitten, but did not die. (season 2)
- Alejandro Edda as Marco Rodriguez: The leader of Los Hermanos, a drug gang who operate near La Colonia. (season 2)
- Karen Bethzabe as Elena Reyes: The former manager of the Rosarito Beach Hotel. (season 2; guest season 3)
- Ramses Jimenez as Hector Reyes: Elena's nephew who previously managed the hotel with her. (season 2; guest season 3)
- Andres Londono as Oscar Diaz: The leader of a group of survivors from a wedding party that took place during the beginning of the apocalypse, now living at the Rosarito Beach Hotel. (season 2)
- Raul Casso as Andrés Diaz: A member of the wedding party and Oscar's brother. (season 2)
- Brenda Strong as Ilene Stowe: A member of the wedding party and Oscar's mother-in-law. (season 2; guest season 3)
- Kelly Blatz as Brandon Luke: The leader of a group of young men that befriend Chris. (season 2)
- Kenny Wormald as Derek: A reckless member of Brandon's group. (season 2)

==== Introduced in season 3 ====
- Michael William Freeman as Blake Sarno: A remorseless member of Broke Jaw Ranch's militia. (season 3)
- Matt Lasky as Cooper: An honorable member of the Broke Jaw Ranch's militia. (season 3)
- Rae Gray as Gretchen Trimbol: A resident of the Broke Jaw Ranch who becomes friends with Alicia. (season 3)
- Sarah Benoit as Pat Daley: An outspoken resident of the Broke Jaw Ranch.
- Jesse Borrego as Efrain Morales: The chief water distributor for the Gonzalez Dam who saves Daniel's life when he was injured by a fire. (season 3)
- Michael Greyeyes as Qaletaqa "Taqa" Walker: The Native American leader of the Black Hat Reservation who is at war with Jeremiah Otto, who occupies his people's lands. (season 3)
- Justin Rain as Lee (aka "Crazy Dog"): The right-hand man of Qaletaqa and a former U.S. army sniper. (season 3)

==== Introduced in season 4 ====
- Kevin Zegers as Melvin: The antagonistic leader of the Vultures, a group of opportunistic survivors who scavenge from failed communities. (season 4)
- Evan Gamble as Ennis: Melvin's right-hand man and brother. (season 4)
- Sebastian Sozzi as Cole: A supply runner for the baseball stadium community. (season 4; guest season 6)
- Rhoda Griffis as Vivian: A resident of the baseball stadium community. (season 4; guest season 6)
- Kenneth Wayne Bradley as Douglas: A resident of the baseball stadium community and Vivian's husband. (season 4; guest season 6)
- Tonya Pinkins as Martha: A mysterious antagonistic woman who kills every survivor that tries to help someone else, believing it makes them weak. (season 4)
- Aaron Stanford as Jim Brauer: A secluded brewer who has no experience fighting the undead. (season 4)
- Daryl Mitchell as Wendell Rabinowitz: The adoptive brother of Sarah who uses a wheelchair. (seasons 4–5, 7; guest season 6)

==== Introduced in season 5 ====
- Matt Frewer as Logan (aka "Desert Fox"): The former partner of Clayton (aka "Polar Bear") who became disillusioned with Clayton's vision of helping other survivors and forms his own crew. (season 5)
- Cooper Dodson as Dylan: Annie and Max's younger brother. (season 5)
- Bailey Gavulic as Annie: A teenage survivor and Dylan and Max's older sister who leads a group of orphaned children. (season 5)
- Ethan Suess as Max: A teenage survivor and Annie and Dylan's brother. (season 5)
- Sydney Lemmon as Isabelle: A helicopter pilot working for the mysterious organization known as the Civic Republic Military who develops a relationship with Althea. (season 5; guest seasons 6–7)
- Mikala Gibson as Doris: Logan's right-hand woman. (season 5)
- Cory Hart as Rollie: A loyal member of Logan's crew who clashes with Dwight. (seasons 5–6)
- Peter Jacobson as Jacob Kessner: A rabbi who joins Morgan's group after being rescued from the undead. (seasons 5–6; guest season 7)
- Colby Minifie as Virginia: The antagonistic leader of the Pioneers, a network of several communities throughout Texas and Oklahoma, and Dakota's mother. (seasons 5–6)
- Holly Curran as Janis: A former member of the Pioneers who is saved by Wes and later joins Morgan's group. (season 5; guest season 6)

==== Introduced in season 6 ====
- Brigitte Kali Canales as Rachel: A former member of the Pioneers and the biological mother of Mo. (season 6)
- Craig Nigh as Hill: A high-ranking member of the Pioneers and Virginia's loyal right-hand man. (season 6)
- Justin Smith as Marcus: An arrogant member of the Pioneers. (season 6)
- John Glover as Theodore "Teddy" Maddox: The leader of a doomsday cult and a serial killer who was arrested by John Dorie Sr. in the 1970s and incarcerated. (season 6)
- Nick Stahl as Jason Riley: Teddy's right-hand man and a former crew member aboard the USS Pennsylvania, a submarine armed with nuclear missiles. (season 6)

==== Introduced in season 7 ====
- Omid Abtahi as Howard: The deputy leader of the Tower and Strand's right-hand man who was a former history teacher. (season 7; guest season 6)
- Demetrius Grosse as Josiah LaRoux: A seasoned survivor seeking revenge against Morgan. (season 7)
  - Grosse also portrays Josiah's twin brother Emile LaRoux. (guest season 6)
- Spenser Granese as Arnold "Arno": The leader of the Stalkers, a group of scavengers who are former members of Teddy's cult. (season 7)

==== Introduced in season 8 ====
- Maya Eshet as Sam Krennick (aka "Shrike"): The ruthless co-leader of PADRE alongside her brother Ben, whose aim is to rescue children from their parents and raise them without having emotional attachments. (season 8)
- Zoey Merchant as Morgan "Mo" (aka "Wren"): The adopted daughter of Morgan and Grace, named after the former, who is taken in and raised by PADRE. (season 8)
- Jayla Walton as Odessa Sanderson (aka "Dove"): A prefect at PADRE and a friend of Mo's. (season 8)
- Gavin Warren as Finch: Dwight and Sherry's son, who was raised by PADRE. (season 8)
- Daniel Rashid as Ben Krennick (aka "Crane"): The cunning co-leader of PADRE alongside his sister Sam. (season 8)
- Isha Blaaker as Frank: Strand's German husband and Klaus's father. (season 8)
- Julian Grey as Klaus: The adopted son of Victor Strand. (season 8)
- Randy Bernales as Russell: The second-in-command of Troy's group. (season 8)
- Antonella Rose as Tracy Otto: Troy's rebellious daughter. (season 8)

== Episodes ==
The first season consists of six episodes. The second season, comprising 15 episodes, premiered on April 10, 2016. On April 15, 2016, AMC announced the series had been renewed for a 16-episode third season, which premiered on June 4, 2017. In April 2017, AMC renewed the series for a 16-episode fourth season and announced that Andrew Chambliss and Ian Goldberg would replace the departing Dave Erickson as showrunners. The fourth season premiered on April 15, 2018. On July 28, 2018, the series was renewed for a fifth season, which premiered on June 2, 2019. On July 19, 2019, the series was renewed for a sixth season, which premiered on October 11, 2020. On December 3, 2020, the series was renewed for a seventh season, which premiered on October 17, 2021. In December 2021, the series was renewed for an eighth season, which was later confirmed to be the final season. It consists of 12 episodes, split into two six-episode parts and premiered on May 14, 2023.

Season	Episodes	Originally released	
Season	Episodes	First released	Last released
1	6	August 23, 2015	October 4, 2015
2	15	April 10, 2016	October 2, 2016
3	16	June 4, 2017	October 15, 2017
4	16	April 15, 2018	September 30, 2018
5	16	June 2, 2019	September 29, 2019
6	16	October 11, 2020	June 13, 2021
7	16	October 17, 2021	June 5, 2022
8	12	May 14, 2023	November 19, 2023

== Production ==
=== Development ===
In September 2013, AMC announced they were developing a companion series to The Walking Dead, which follows a different set of characters created by Robert Kirkman. In September 2014, AMC ordered a pilot, which was written by Kirkman and Dave Erickson, and directed by Adam Davidson, and is executive produced by Kirkman, Erickson, Gale Anne Hurd, and David Alpert, with Erickson serving as showrunner. The project was originally known as Cobalt; Kirkman confirmed, in March 2015, that the series would be titled Fear the Walking Dead. On March 9, 2015, AMC announced it had ordered Fear the Walking Dead to series, with a two-season commitment. The series premiered on August 23, 2015.

=== Casting ===
The primary characters from the first season include (from left to right): Alicia, Nick, Madison, Travis, Liza, Chris, Daniel, Griselda, and Ofelia

In December 2014, the first four starring roles were cast: Kim Dickens as Madison Clark, the female lead; Cliff Curtis as Travis Manawa, the male lead; Frank Dillane as Nick; and Alycia Debnam-Carey as Alicia. In April and May 2015, Elizabeth Rodriguez and Mercedes Mason were announced as series regulars, both in unknown roles. In December 2015, it was announced that Colman Domingo was promoted to series regular.

In March 2017, it was revealed that Daniel Sharman joined the cast as a series regular. In April 2017, several new actors were announced having joined the series, including Dayton Callie (reprising his guest role from the second season) and Sam Underwood, who, along with Daniel Sharman play members of the Otto family, and Lisandra Tena as Lola Guerrero.

In November 2017, it was confirmed that Lennie James who portrays Morgan Jones on The Walking Dead would crossover and join the main cast in the fourth season. The fourth season also sees the additions of several new series regulars, played by Garret Dillahunt, Jenna Elfman, and Maggie Grace.

In December 2018, it was reported that Rubén Blades, who last appeared in the series's third season, would return in the fifth season as Daniel Salazar. In January 2019, it was reported that Austin Amelio would join the cast as Dwight, who last appeared in the eighth season of The Walking Dead. In March 2019, it was announced that Karen David had joined the main cast for the fifth season as Grace. In December 2019, it was announced that Zoe Colletti would join the main cast for the sixth season as Dakota, and that Mo Collins and Colby Hollman were promoted to series regulars. In December 2021, it was announced that Kim Dickens would return as Madison Clark in the seventh season, after last appearing in the fourth season where her character was believed to have been killed off.

=== Music ===
Paul Haslinger composed the score for the series in its first three seasons. After Dave Erickson left at the end of the third season of the series, the show underwent major changes with the fourth season taking on a semi-reboot approach. Haslinger was replaced by Danny Bensi and Saunder Jurriaans beginning with the fourth season. The original title card composed by Atticus Ross was also replaced.

=== Filming ===
Production of the pilot episode began in early 2015 and ended on February 6, 2015. The pilot and early episodes were filmed in Los Angeles, including Woodrow Wilson High School; the remaining first-season episodes were filmed in Vancouver, British Columbia, Canada. Production on the remaining five first-season episodes began on May 11, 2015. Adam Davidson, who directed the pilot, also directed the series's second and third episodes.

Filming for the second season began in December 2015, with production moving to Baja California, Mexico. Locations included Rosarito (sea scenes and hotel) and Valle de Guadalupe (Abigail's vineyard). The sea scenes were filmed using a horizon tank at Baja Film Studios. An additional scene from the season one finale was filmed in The Sunken City, San Pedro, Los Angeles. Filming for the third season began on January 6, 2017, in Baja California, Mexico, with some of the same location sites used for the second half of season two. Additional locations in Tijuana Municipality included Avenida Revolución, Abelardo L. Rodríguez Dam and the hills that hosted the Otto's ranch.

Filming for the fourth season began in early 2018 in various locations around Austin, Texas, including the Dell Diamond baseball stadium in nearby Round Rock, the vacant Brackenridge Hospital in downtown Austin, and the flood-damaged Onion Creek neighborhood. Filming for the fifth season began in December 2018. It was also confirmed by the showrunners that the season would be filmed in New Braunfels, Texas.

In March 2020, production for the sixth season was reported to have gone on a three-week hiatus due to the COVID-19 pandemic. The seventh season began filming in April 2021 in Texas, and wrapped in December 2021.

Production for the eighth season moved from Texas to Savannah, Georgia. The final season began filming in August 2022 and concluded in March 2023.

== Broadcast ==
On August 23, 2015, the series debuted simultaneously worldwide on: AMC in the U.S.; AMC Global in major regional markets in Africa, Asia, Europe, Latin America, and the Middle East; and FX in Australia. AMC+ holds the show's video on demand rights in the U.S., while Amazon Instant Video owns the streaming rights in Austria and Germany, and make episodes available online one day after their original airing. Streaming in the UK became available to Amazon Prime members in 2016.

== Reception ==
=== Critical response ===
Critical response of Fear the Walking Dead
Season	Rotten Tomatoes	Metacritic
1	76% (206 reviews)	66 (33 reviews)
2	70% (223 reviews)	54 (12 reviews)
3	84% (110 reviews)	—N/a
4	80% (164 reviews)	—N/a
5	55% (211 reviews)	—N/a
6	89% (9 reviews)	—N/a
7	—N/a	—N/a
8	60% (5 reviews)	—N/a

==== Season 1 ====
On Rotten Tomatoes, the first season has a rating of 76%, based on 206 reviews, whose average rating is 6.75/10. The site's critical consensus reads, "Fear the Walking Dead recycles elements of its predecessor, but it's still moody and engrossing enough to compete with the original." On Metacritic, the season has a score of 66 out of 100, based on 33 critics, indicating "generally favorable reviews".

Elisabeth Vincentelli of the New York Post rated the first two episodes three out of four stars, stating that "[They] are creepily suspenseful–they're great examples of how effective a slow pace and a moody atmosphere can be." Another positive review of the first episode came from Ken Tucker of Yahoo TV, who wrote, "Fear the Walking Dead is a mood piece, more artful than the original series" and that the cast is "terrific". Tim Goodman of The Hollywood Reporter wrote, "The 90-minute first episode and the hour-long second episode are, while not actually boring, certainly less magnetic than the original." Daniel Fienberg and Alan Sepinwall of HitFix reviewed the premiere episode, with Fienberg calling it "awful ... as bad as The Walking Dead has ever gotten at its very worst", while Sepinwall called his B− review "slightly generous".

==== Season 2 ====
On Rotten Tomatoes, the season has a rating of 70%, based on 223 reviews, whose average rating is 6.6/10. The site's critical consensus reads, "Fear the Walking Dead sets sail in its sophomore season with an intriguing backdrop that doesn't always disguise its deficiencies in comparison to its predecessor." On Metacritic, the season has a score of 54 out of 100, based on 12 critics, indicating "mixed or average reviews".

==== Season 3 ====
On Rotten Tomatoes, the third season has an approval rating of 84% based on 110 reviews, with an average rating of 7.25/10. The site's critical consensus reads, "A distinctive ensemble brings a compelling flavor of Fear the Walking Dead mythos, but this ambitious spinoff still shares its originator's penchant longwinded pacing that may diminish the tension for some viewers." In his season review for IGN, Matt Fowler gave it an 8.2 out of 10, writing, "Fear the Walking Dead more solidly found its tone and voice this season by embracing the arid landscape, ramping up the human-on-human conflict, and rallying around Kim Dickens's anti-hero mom, Madison, as the driving character", and it is now "a better series overall than The Walking Dead".

==== Season 4 ====
On Rotten Tomatoes, the fourth season has an approval rating of 80% based on 164 reviews, with an average rating of 6.85/10. The site's critical consensus reads, "Fear the Walking Dead shuffles onward confidently in its fourth season with a bevy of horrifying set-pieces and heartbreaking twists, but some viewers may be dispirited by the series's constant reshuffling of its characters." TVLine reevaluated the series for its fourth season, giving it a grade of a "B+". Reviewer Charlie Mason wrote, "it's gone from being an adequate stopgap between seasons of The Walking Dead to a show that's as good or arguably even better than the one from which it was spun off", stating that the season has had several genuine surprises in its storytelling.

==== Season 5 ====
On Rotten Tomatoes, the season has a rating of 55% based on 211 reviews, with an average rating of 5.1/10. The site's critical consensus reads, "Despite delivering some memorable and splatter-filled zombie set-pieces that fans crave, Fear the Walking Dead feels stiff with early-onset rigor mortis in a fifth season that emphasizes altruism over coherent characterization."

==== Season 6 ====
On Rotten Tomatoes, the sixth season has an approval rating of 89% based on 9 reviews, with an average rating of 7.3/10.

==== Season 8 ====
On Rotten Tomatoes, the eighth season has an approval rating of 60% based on 5 reviews, with an average rating of 7/10.

=== Ratings ===
The American series premiere attracted 10.1 million total viewers, with 6.3 million in the advertiser-coveted 18-to-49-year-old demographic, both cable television records for a series premiere. Numerous international debuts of the pilot also set ratings records. The first season averaged 11.2 million viewers in "live plus-3" ratings (includes VOD and DVR viewing within three days after initial telecast) to become the highest-rated first season of any series in cable history.

Viewership and ratings per season of Fear the Walking Dead
Season	Timeslot (ET)	Episodes	First aired		Last aired		Avg. viewers (millions)
Season	Timeslot (ET)	Episodes	Date	Viewers (millions)	Date	Viewers (millions)	Avg. viewers (millions)
1	Sunday 9:00 pm	6	August 23, 2015	10.13	October 4, 2015	6.86	7.61
2	Sunday 9:00 pm	15	April 10, 2016	6.67	October 2, 2016	3.05	4.19
3	Sunday 9:00 pm	16	June 4, 2017	3.11	October 15, 2017	2.23	2.36
4	Sunday 9:00 pm	16 (Note: The premiere episode aired outside of its regular time at Sunday 10:00 pm.)	April 15, 2018	4.09	September 30, 2018	2.13	2.27
5	Sunday 9:00 pm	16	June 2, 2019	1.97	September 29, 2019	1.51	1.51
6	Sunday 9:00 pm	16	October 11, 2020	1.59	June 13, 2021	1.05	1.18
7	Sunday 9:00 pm	16	October 17, 2021	1.09	June 5, 2022	0.71	0.82
8	Sunday 9:00 pm	12	May 14, 2023	0.56	November 19, 2023	0.44	0.49

=== Awards and nominations ===
Year	Award	Category	Recipient	Result	Ref.
2015	E! Online Best. Ever. TV. Awards	New Show You're Most Excited to See	Fear the Walking Dead	Won	
2016	42nd Saturn Awards	Best Horror Television Series	Fear the Walking Dead	Nominated	
2016	42nd Saturn Awards	Best Actress on Television	Kim Dickens	Nominated	
2016	42nd Saturn Awards	Best Performance by a Younger Actor on Television	Frank Dillane	Nominated	
2016	E! Online TV Scoop Awards	Female Breakout Star	Alycia Debnam-Carey	Won	
2017	43rd Saturn Awards	Best Horror Television Series	Fear the Walking Dead	Nominated	
2017	43rd Saturn Awards	Best Actress on a Television Series	Kim Dickens	Nominated	
2017	43rd Saturn Awards	Best Younger Actor on a Television Series	Alycia Debnam-Carey	Nominated	
2017	43rd Saturn Awards	Best Younger Actor on a Television Series	Lorenzo James Henrie	Nominated	
2018	16th Visual Effects Society Awards	Outstanding Supporting Visual Effects in a Photoreal Episode	Peter Crosman, Denise Gayle, Philip Nussbaumer, Martin Pelletier, Frank Ludica for "Sleigh Ride"	Nominated	
2018	44th Saturn Awards	Best Horror Television Series	Fear the Walking Dead	Nominated	
2018	44th Saturn Awards	Best Performance by a Younger Actor on a Television Series	Alycia Debnam-Carey	Nominated	
2018	44th Saturn Awards	Best Guest-Starring Performance on Television	Michael Greyeyes	Nominated	
2019	45th Saturn Awards	Best Horror Television Series	Fear the Walking Dead	Nominated	
2019	45th Saturn Awards	Best Supporting Actor on a Television Series	Lennie James	Nominated	
2019	45th Saturn Awards	Best Guest-Starring Performance on a Television Series	Sydney Lemmon	Nominated	
2019	45th Saturn Awards	Best Guest-Starring Performance on a Television Series	Tonya Pinkins	Nominated	
2021	19th Visual Effects Society Awards	Outstanding Special (Practical) Effects in a Photoreal or Animated Project	Frank Iudica, Scott Roark, Daniel J. Yates for "Bury Her Next to Jasper's Leg"	Won	
2021	46th Saturn Awards	Best Horror Television Series	Fear the Walking Dead	Nominated	
2021	46th Saturn Awards	Best Supporting Actress on Television	Colby Minifie	Nominated	
2022	47th Saturn Awards	Best Horror Television Series: Network/Cable	Fear the Walking Dead	Nominated	
2022	47th Saturn Awards	Best Actor in a Network or Cable Television Series	Colman Domingo	Nominated	
2022	47th Saturn Awards	Best Guest-Starring Performance in a Network or Cable Television Series	Aisha Tyler	Nominated	

== Web series ==
=== Fear the Walking Dead: Flight 462 ===
Fear the Walking Dead: Flight 462, a 16-part web series, premiered on October 4, 2015, on AMC.com; it also aired as promos during The Walking Dead season 6. Two of the web series's characters, Alex (previously known as Charlie) and Jake, are introduced in Fear the Walking Dead season 2, episode 3 ("Ouroboros").

=== Fear the Walking Dead: Passage ===
A second 16-part web series debuted on October 17, 2016, and episodes were made available online weekly and aired as promos during the seventh season of The Walking Dead. The web series follows Sierra, a capable survivor, who helps an injured woman named Gabi as they try to find sanctuary. The series was written by Lauren Signorino and Mike Zunic, and directed by Andrew Bernstein.

=== The Althea Tapes ===
A six-part web series was released from July 27 to August 8, 2019, on AMC.com and YouTube. The web series features Althea interviewing different survivors for their story.

=== Dead in the Water ===
In March 2021, AMC announced the digital spin-off series Dead in the Water: A Fear the Walking Dead Story, which is set aboard USS Pennsylvania and "tells the story of a submarine crew fighting for survival, cut off from the surface world just as the apocalypse hits, becoming a nuclear-fueled walker-filled death trap with no way out." The special stars Nick Stahl as Jason Riley and premiered on AMC+ on April 10, 2022.

== Home media ==
The first season was released on Blu-ray and DVD on December 1, 2015, by Starz through Anchor Bay Entertainment, under license from AMC Networks. A special edition version of the first season was released on Blu-ray and DVD on March 22, 2016, with new bonus features, including deleted scenes, seven featurettes, and audio commentaries by cast and crew, on all six episodes. The second season, featuring audio commentaries, deleted scenes, and various behind-the-scene featurettes, was released on Blu-ray and DVD on December 13, 2016. The third season, featuring audio commentaries and deleted scenes, was released on Blu-ray and DVD on March 13, 2018. The fourth season, featuring four audio commentaries, was released on Blu-ray and DVD on March 5, 2019. The fifth season, featuring three audio commentaries, was released on Blu-ray and DVD on May 19, 2020. The sixth season, featuring audio commentaries, was released on Blu-ray and DVD on August 31, 2021. The seventh season was released on Blu-ray and DVD on January 10, 2023. The eighth and final season was released on Blu-ray and DVD on February 27, 2024. The complete series was released on Blu-ray and DVD on October 15, 2024.

== Lawsuit ==
In July 2018, Mel Smith, the creator of the comic book series Dead Ahead, filed a lawsuit against AMC Studios charging that the second season of Fear the Walking Dead stole thematic elements from Dead Ahead, specifically a group of survivors attempting to flee a zombie apocalypse by a boat. The lawsuit also includes David Alpert, who was Smith's agent and who remains a business partner with Robert Kirkman, and who is one of Fear's executive producers; Smith's lawsuit asserts that Alpert violated his fiduciary duty to protect Smith's interests when he began working on Fear. AMC attempted to have the lawsuit dismissed, stating that once one stripped out generic elements of the zombie genre, there were no further similarities between the works. In February 2019, judge Lucy Koh rejected this, believing that it would be necessary to have a discovery phase and expert testimony to evaluate AMC's stance.

In March 2019, AMC settled the lawsuit, details remained confidential.
