= Alexa Nisenson =

American actress

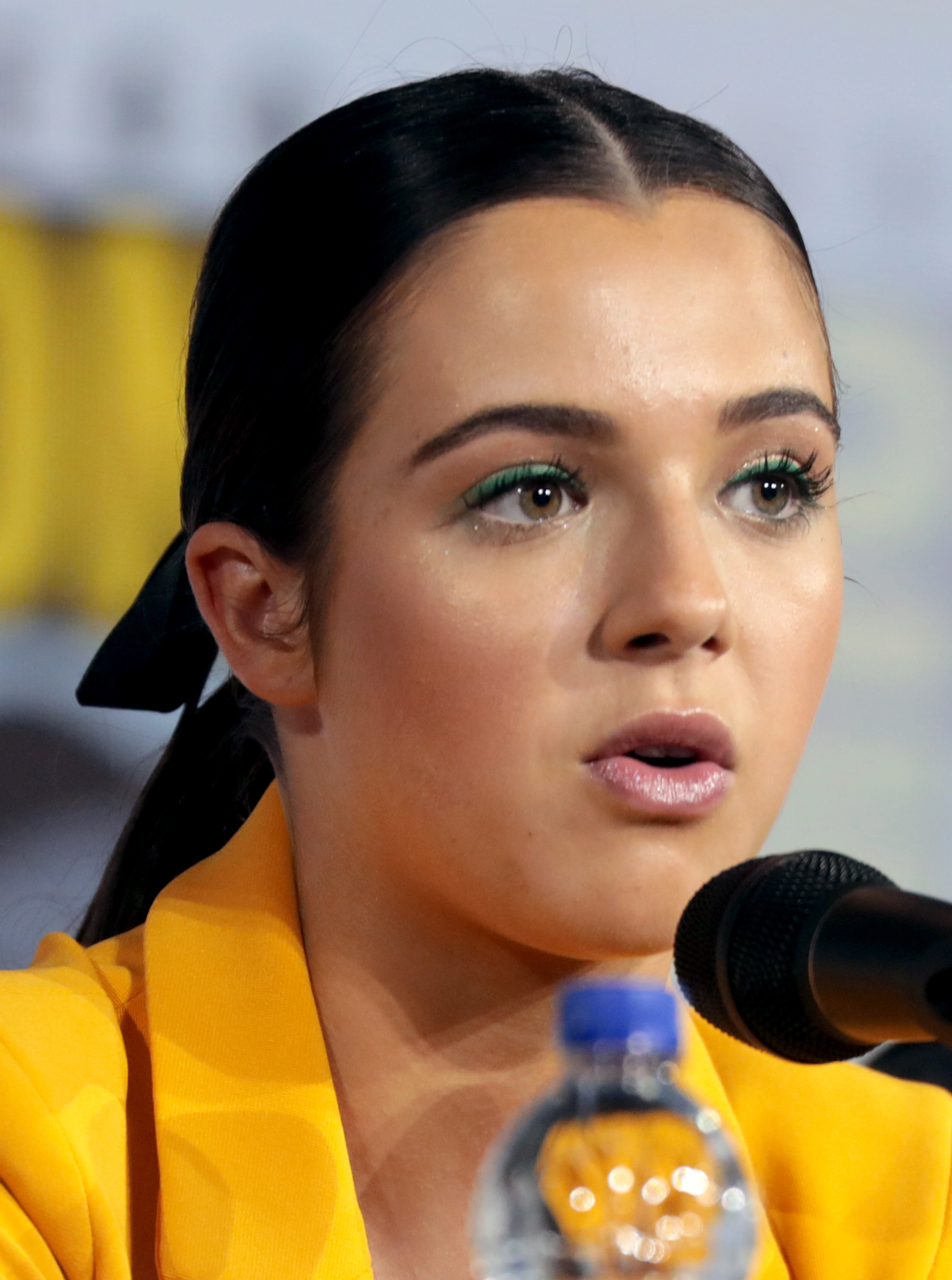
- Nisenson in 2019
- Born: June 8, 2006 (age 20); Boca Raton, Florida, U.S.
- Occupation: Actress
- Years active: 2015–present
- Notable work: Middle School: The Worst Years of My Life; Fear the Walking Dead

Alexa Nisenson (born June 8, 2006) is an American actress, best known for playing Charlie on the AMC horror drama television series Fear the Walking Dead (2018–2023).

== Career ==
Nisenson began acting professionally at the age of eight years old and made in 2015 her television debut on NBC's Constantine as Geraldine Chandler. A year later, in October 2016, she made her feature film debut in the film Middle School: The Worst Years of My Life. For her role in this film, she received in 2017 an award in the category Best Performance in a Feature Film – Supporting Young Actress at the 38th edition of the Young Artist Award. After this she appeared in the film Fist Fight, and in the television series Good Behavior and Will & Grace.

In April 2018, Nisenson made her debut as the character Charlie in the AMC post-apocalyptic horror drama television series Fear the Walking Dead. Her character was a recurring character in the fourth season, but was promoted to series regular for season five. She was seen as a regular until the end of season seven in 2021. She made a one-time return in season eight in 2023. In between, from July 2018 to August 2023, Nisenson provided the voice of Alexa Mongello on the Cartoon Network series Summer Camp Island. She also appeared in the lead role of Shelly in the film Orphan Horse in 2018, starring alongside Academy Award-winner Jon Voight.

Following this, Nisenson provided the voice of Jess in the podcast series Discovering Dad in 2024 and played the role of Young Harriet Parker in the CBS series NCIS in 2025.

== Filmography ==
=== Film ===
Year	Title	Role	Notes
2016	Middle School: The Worst Years of My Life	Georgia Khatchadorian	
2017	Fist Fight	Ally Campbell	
2018	Orphan Horse	Shelly	

=== Television ===
Year	Title	Role	Notes
2015	Constantine	Geraldine Chandler	Episode: "Quid Pro Quo"
2017	Good Behavior	Apple	2 episodes
2018	Will & Grace	Young Karen	Episode: "Staten Island Fairy"
2018–2023	Fear the Walking Dead	Charlie	Recurring role (season 4); Main cast (season 5–7); Guest role (season 8)
2018–2023	Summer Camp Island	Alexa Mongello	Voice role: 19 episodes
2025	NCIS	Young Harriet Parker	3 episodes

=== Video games ===
Year	Title	Role	Notes
2017	Farpoint	Young Carol Anne	Voice role

=== Podcast ===
Year	Title	Role	Notes
2024	Discovering Dad	Jess	Voice role

== Awards and nominations ==
Year	Award	Category	Work	Result	Ref.
2016	Young Entertainer Award	Best Young Ensemble Cast - Feature Film	Middle School: The Worst Years of My Life	Nominated	
2017	Young Artist Award	Best Performance in a Feature Film – Supporting Young Actress	Middle School: The Worst Years of My Life	Won	
