= Daryl Mitchell (actor) =

American actor

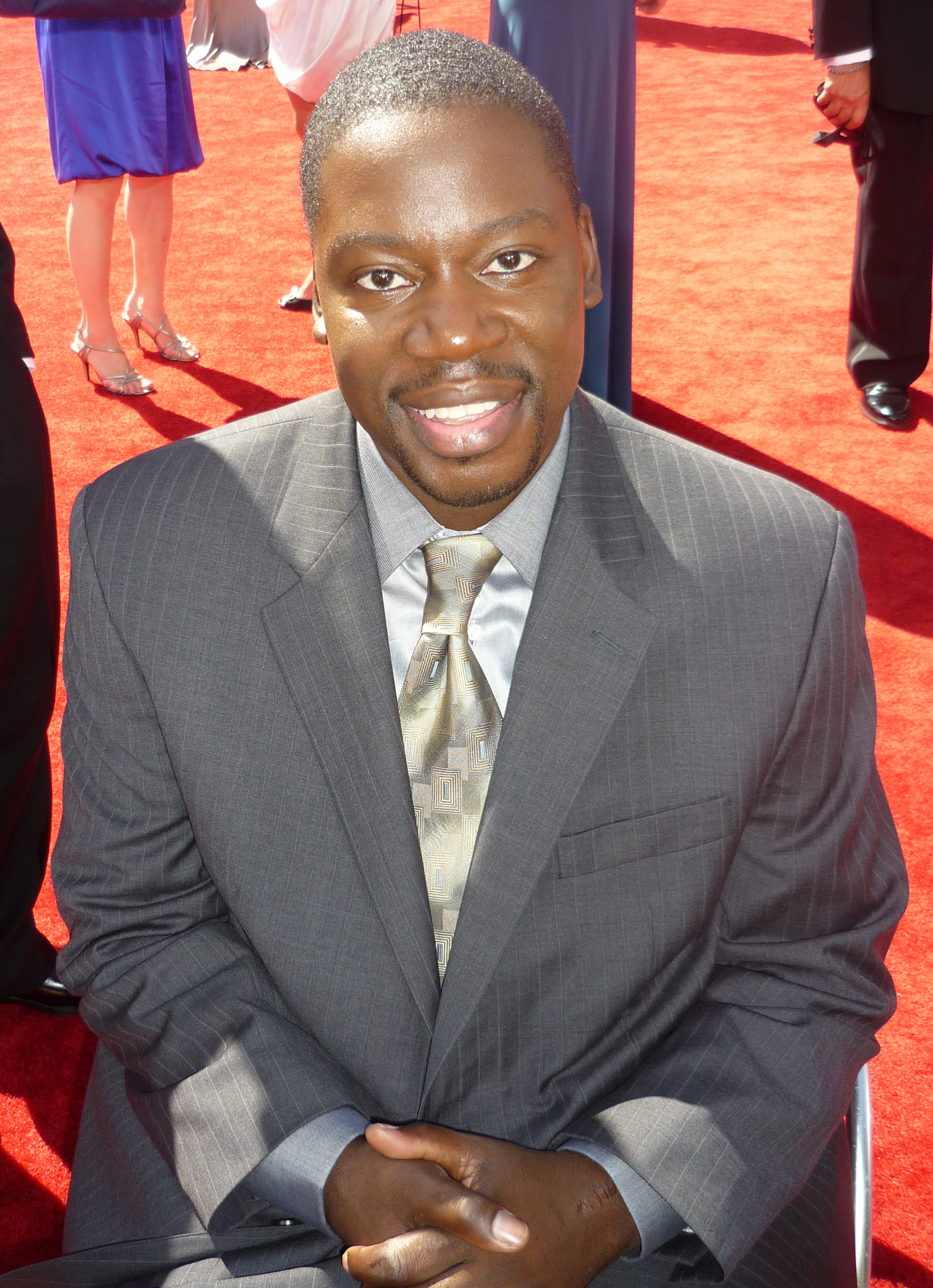
- Mitchell in September 2009
- Born: July 16, 1965 (age 61); The Bronx, New York City, U.S.
- Occupations: Actor, rapper
- Years active: 1985–present
- Spouse: Carol (m. 1998)
- Children: 4

Daryl "Chill" Mitchell (born July 16, 1965) is an American actor and former rapper. He is known for such roles as Dexter Wilson on The John Larroquette Show, Tommy Webber in Galaxy Quest, Leo Michaels on Veronica's Closet, Eli Goggins III on Ed, Patton Plame on NCIS: New Orleans, Wendell Rabinowitz on Fear the Walking Dead and Stitch in Shifting Gears. For his performance in the sitcom Brothers, Mitchell won the NAACP Image Award for Outstanding Actor in a Comedy Series.

== Early life ==
Mitchell was born in The Bronx, to a secretary mother and a bus driver father. He grew up in Wyandanch.

== Career ==
During the 1980s, Mitchell was a member of the hip hop group Groove B. Chill. Mitchell made his film debut in House Party (1990). He had taken the role for both financial reasons and in hopes of popularizing his music. After acting in the sequel, Mitchell decided to leave music to focus strictly on acting.

His first regular role on television was on the sitcom Here and Now as T. Mitchell landed the role of Dexter, a lunch attendant who often argued with the protagonist, on the sitcom The John Larroquette Show (1993−96). For his work on John Larroquette, Mitchell was nominated for an NAACP Image Award in 1996 for Outstanding Supporting Actor in a Comedy Series. He appeared regularly as marketing director Leo on Veronica's Closet from 1997 to 2000.

He appeared as Wally, a mechanic, in Sgt. Bilko (1996), with Steve Martin and Chris Rock among his co-stars. Mitchell was Earl in A Thin Line Between Love and Hate (1996) and played Roy in Home Fries (1998). Mitchell appeared as Raul in the Disney film Toothless (1997) alongside Veronica's Closet co-star Kirstie Alley.

In 1999, Mitchell acted in two feature films. He appeared as English teacher Mr. Morgan in 10 Things I Hate About You and portrayed Tommy Webber, a fictional actor who performed as Lieutenant Laredo during childhood, in the science fiction spoof Galaxy Quest.

He appeared as police officer Chambers in Lucky Numbers (2000) and was Steve in Black Knight (2001). Mitchell played a state trooper in The Country Bears (2002), which finished filming shortly before he was paralyzed in a motorcycle accident.

Mitchell's first role following the accident was Eli, a bowling alley manager, in Ed (2002−04). He joined the series in its third season. The producers of the series, already feeling the ensemble was too large, balked at the idea of another character being introduced. However, producer Jon Beckerman's worries were quelled upon meeting Mitchell and he was taken by Mitchell's sense of humor, leading to the character of Eli being created.

In 2009, he portrayed Chill Trainor in the short-lived sitcom Brothers with Michael Strahan. A reviewer for The New York Times found Mitchell's character to be the most interesting, and praised the actor's line delivery. Despite the show's short run, Mitchell received his second NAACP Image Award nomination in 2010, in the category of Outstanding Actor in a Comedy Series. Mitchell went on to win the award on February 26, 2010. From 2014 to 2021 he starred in NCIS: New Orleans as recurring-turned-main character Patton Plame, a computer specialist for NCIS. In 2018, he joined the cast of Fear the Walking Dead portraying Wendell.

In September 2009, Mitchell was profiled on TV One's biographical documentary program Life After, a series that examines the lives of celebrities following a career turning point.

== Personal life ==
Mitchell and his wife, Carol, have four children. As of 2010, they live in Sugar Hill, Georgia, a suburb of Atlanta.

=== Motorcycle crash ===
On November 10, 2001, Mitchell was paralyzed from the waist down after a motorcycle crash on an island near Beaufort, South Carolina, in which he lost control of his bike while turning a corner on gravel and loose pavement. He woke up five days later in the hospital. Mitchell got full support from his family and friends, including Denzel Washington and Chris Tucker, to continue his career. He had a recurring role thereafter on the TV program Ed between 2002 and 2004 as a bowling alley manager who was paralyzed after an accident.

Mitchell later started the Daryl Mitchell Foundation to raise awareness of spinal cord injury, and serves as the Minority Outreach spokesman for the Christopher and Dana Reeve Foundation. He has also become a strong advocate for employing actors with disabilities.

== Filmography ==
=== Film ===
Year	Title	Role	Notes
1990	House Party	Chill	
1991	House Party 2	Chill	
1992	Boomerang	Street Photographer	
1993	Fly by Night	Kayam	
1994	Cosmic Slop	-	TV movie
1996	Sgt. Bilko	Pfc. Walter T. Holbrook	
1996	A Thin Line Between Love and Hate	Earl	
1996	Rebound: The Legend of Earl "The Goat" Manigault	Dean Memminger	TV movie
1997	White Lies	Mark	
1997	Quiet Days in Hollywood	Angel	
1997	Toothless	Raul	TV movie
1998	Home Fries	Roy	
1999	10 Things I Hate About You	Mr. Morgan	
1999	Galaxy Quest	Tommy Webber	
2000	The Pooch and the Pauper	Moocher (voice)	TV movie
2000	Lucky Numbers	Det. Chambers	
2001	Slacker Cats	Eddie (voice)	TV Short
2001	Black Knight	Steve	
2002	13 Moons	Lenny	
2002	The Country Bears	Officer Hamm	
2006	Inside Man	Mobile Command Officer Rourke	
2012	Playback	Wylie	
2019	Love & Debt	Ed	

=== Television ===
Year	Title	Role	Notes
1985	The Cosby Show	Guy in Club	Episode: "Clair's Case"
1991	The Cosby Show	Old Head	Episode: "Warning: A Double-Lit Candle Can Cause a Meltdown"
1992	Law & Order	Reginald Beggs	Episode: "The Fertile Fields"
1992–1993	Here and Now	T	Main role
1993	Alex Haley's Queen	Abner	Episode: "Episode #1.3"
1993–1996	The John Larroquette Show	Dexter Walker	Main role
1994	The Fresh Prince of Bel-Air	Chill	Episode: "The Philadelphia Story"
1996	In the House	Militant Guy	Episode: "Home Again"
1997	Cosby	Mike	Episode: "Lucas Platonicus"
1997–2000	Veronica's Closet	Leo Michaels	Main role
2002–2004	Ed	Eli Goggins III	Main role (seasons 3–4)
2004	Law & Order: Criminal Intent	Player in Wheelchair	Episode: "Mad Hops"
2005	Eve	Damien	Episode: "Wheeling and Dealing"
2005	Home Town: Ben's Workshop	Himself	Episode: Daryl "Chill" Mitchell
2007	The Suite Life of Zack & Cody	Himself	Episode: "Back in the Game"
2007	The Game	Chris Clements	Episode: "Media Blitz" & "The Truth Hurts"
2009	Brothers	Chill Trainor	Main role; also producer
2010	Desperate Housewives	Ron	Episode: "The Glamorous Life"
2010	Wizards of Waverly Place	Scientist One	Episode: "Wizards Exposed"
2011	Traffic Light	Liam	Episode: "Help Wanted"
2012	The Cleveland Show	Maurice (voice)	Episode: "Jesus Walks"
2014	See Dad Run	Calvin Riggins	Episode: "See Dad Downsize"
2014–2021	NCIS: New Orleans	Computer Specialist Patton Plame	Recurring role (season 1); main role (season 2–7)
2017	Lifeline	Jack Trevors	2 episodes
2018–2022	Fear the Walking Dead	Wendell	Recurring role (season 4–5, 7); guest role (season 6); 19 episodes
2020	F Is for Family	Chipsy White (voice)	2 episodes
2025–	Shifting Gears	Stitch	Main role

== Awards and nominations ==
Year	Awards	Category	Recipient	Outcome
2010	NAACP Image Award	NAACP Image Award for Outstanding Actor in a Comedy Series	"Brothers"	Won

== Studio album ==
- Starting From Zero (A&M, 1990) (with Groove B. Chill)
