= Handle with Care (Fear the Walking Dead) =

- Fear the Walking Dead episode
- Episode no.: Season 6 Episode 10
- Directed by: Heather Cappiello
- Written by: Ashley Cardiff; David Johnson
- Original air dates: April 22, 2021 (AMC+); April 25, 2021 (AMC)
- Running time: 44 minutes

Guest appearances
- Peter Jacobson as Jacob Kessner; Brigitte Kali Canales as Rachel

Episode chronology
← Previous "Things Left to Do"	Next → "The Holding"
- Fear the Walking Dead (season 6)

"Handle with Care" is the tenth episode of the sixth season of the post-apocalyptic horror television series Fear the Walking Dead, the 79th episode overall, "Handle with Care" was released on the streaming platform AMC+ on April 22, 2021, in the United States and aired on television on AMC three days later, on April 25, 2021.

A threat worse than Virginia is on the horizon. Morgan (Lennie James) calls for unity and invites the leaders of all survivor camps to his settlement, tasking Daniel (Ruben Blades) to keep the peace. However, Daniel will need to face his own challenges in hopes of protecting his friends.

== Plot ==
In the present, Daniel (Ruben Blades) takes a cognitive test inside a jail cell. He states that as the day began, he felt hopeful, but then everything changed. His narration of events continues throughout the episode.

In a series of flash-backs, Morgan (Lennie James) invites Sherry (Christine Evangelista) and Strand (Colman Domingo) to Valley Town, to discuss a new threat. Tasked with security, Daniel collects their guests’ weapons and locks ups everything in a shack. Grace (Karen David) feels contractions so Morgan sets off with the SWAT truck to retrieve medical supplies, leaving Daniel in charge.

Daniel preside over a meeting where they question Dakota(Zoe Colletti) about the new threat which is the group who attacked Tank Town. Voices rise as every party believe there are infiltrators amongst them. The discussion ends when an explosion blows up their shelter, attracting many walkers to the valley.

Daniel goes to the shack and discovers that all the weapons are missing. He tells Charlie (Alexa Nisenson) and Grace to hide until Morgan’s return. Daniel then intentionally lets walkers into the settlement to find out who took the weapons. When a walker is about to kill Dwight (Austin Amelio), Strand saves him using a pistol. Daniel locks up Strand and demands where the weapons are, but Strand insists he is innocent. Daniel shows Strand the prosthetic cheekbone he wears courtesy of Strand’s bullet. He is about to kill Strand when Morgan returns, dispatching the walkers with the SWAT truck. As the group reassemble, Daniel makes several confusing statements. They further discover that the weapons are in Daniel’s shed. Daniel is locked up.

In the present, June (Jenna Elfman) is revealed to be the person assessing Daniel. She diagnoses him with an undetermined psychological disorder. Morgan briefly discuss whether Daniel is faking it, but June deems it unlikely, so Daniel is freed.

As the groups prepare to take off, Dakota speaks up. She recalls Virginia saying that the people who paints the doomsday messages were hiding underground. Their last known whereabouts is Dallas. The groups decide to sort the matter together.

Daniel is spotted leaving the settlement alone. He tearfully explains he cannot trust himself not to endanger the community. Strand offers Daniel a place to live in Lawton and Daniel accepts.

== Reception ==
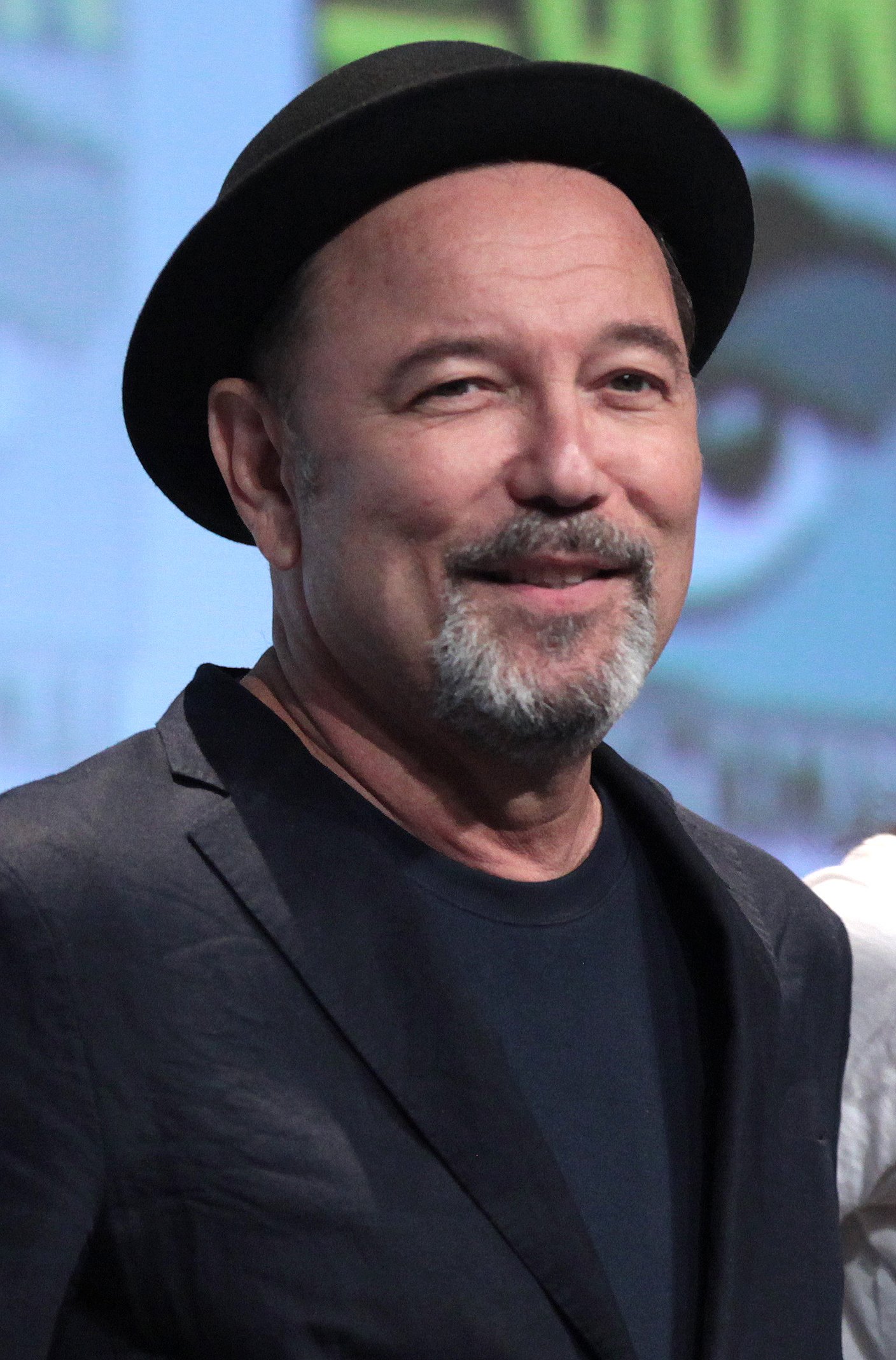
Ruben Blades received positive reviews for his performance as Daniel Salazar in this episode.

=== Critical reception ===
David S.E. Zapanta from Den of Geek! rate the episode 4 out of 5 and wrote: "I’m glad Fear is giving these original characters their due. As much as I love the newer arrivals, like Morgan, it’s good to acknowledge the characters (and their many defining imperfections) that got us here in the first place." Erik Kain of Forbes had mixed opinions of the episode, writing, "Not a terrible episode, not an episode I’d watch twice. They really need to thin the herd, and not just by killing the show’s best characters. Hell, my vote goes to Al’s stupid SWAT van. That thing has to go. It should never have been introduced in the first place." Writing for "TV Fanatic", Paul Daily gave the episode 4.75 out of 5 and wrote: "Daniel Salazar is the best-written character on TV. ... [He] has managed to survive the mass cast exodus in the seasons since [the first]." Emily Hannemann of TV Insider gave the episode a 4.5 out of 5, writing "I'm looking forward to seeing where Daniel's story goes from here. Especially now that he's with Strand."

=== Ratings ===
The episode was seen by 1.10 million viewers in the United States on its original air date, below the previous episodes.
