= Things Left to Do =

- Fear the Walking Dead episode
- Episode no.: Season 6 Episode 9
- Directed by: Michael E. Satrazemis
- Written by: Nick Bernardone
- Original air dates: April 15, 2021 (AMC+); April 18, 2021 (AMC)
- Running time: 50 minutes

Guest appearances
- Colby Minifie as Virginia; Peter Jacobson as Jacob Kessner; Brigitte Kali Canales as Rachel; Craig Nigh as Hill

Episode chronology
← Previous "The Door"	Next → "Handle with Care"
- Fear the Walking Dead (season 6)

"Things Left to Do" is the ninth episode of the sixth season of the post-apocalyptic horror television series Fear the Walking Dead, the 78th episode overall, "Things Left to Do" was released on the streaming platform AMC+ on April 15, 2021, in the United States and aired on television on AMC three days later, on April 18, 2021.

A stand-off occurs between Morgan’s group and Virginia (Colby Minifie) and her rangers. Ginny has made a lot of enemies and it's finally catching up to her. The episode marks the final appearance of John Dorie (Garret Dillahunt) and Virginia, portrayed by Colby Minifie, who is killed by June Dorie (Jenna Elfman).

== Plot ==
A devastated June (Jenna Elfman) digs a grave for John (Garret Dillahunt). She grabs John’s gun from his corpse, but Ranger Hill (Craig Nigh) stops her. June asks Virginia (Colby Minifie) why Dakota (Zoe Colletti) murdered John to no avail.

At night, Virginia and the Pioneers interrogate Sarah (Mo Collins), Daniel Salazar (Ruben Blades), Grace (Karen David), Luciana (Danay García) and Wes (Colby Hollman) about Morgan’s whereabouts. Frustrated, they beat Daniel up, and Virginia threatens over the radio to kill Grace. Morgan appears and tells the Pioneers the truth about Cameron’s murder. Strand (Colman Domingo) and the Pioneers loyal to him turn on Virginia. When Virginia tries to fire, Strand injures her and a shootout erupts. Virginia orders Hill to leave with Grace and Daniel as hostages. Morgan captures Virginia and escapes with her.

The next day, Morgan treats Virginia's wound and tells her he plans to keep her alive to trade for Grace and Daniel. Virginia reveals to Morgan that Dakota is actually her daughter. Later, Sherry (Christine Evangelista) and her masked group arrive in the SWAT truck, forcing Morgan and Virginia to flee. Virginia’s injury makes running difficult, and Sherry catches her. Morgan tells Sherry they cannot kill Virginia as he needs her for his friends. Sherry reluctantly lets them leave.

Morgan brings Virginia to his settlement and tells Alicia (Alycia Debnam-Carey), Dwight (Austin Amelio), Althea (Maggie Grace) and Charlie (Alexa Nisenson) to keep Virginia safe. However, Strand, the rebel Pioneers, and the masked group arrive, demanding justice from Morgan. Virginia accepts her fate and tells Morgan she’ll free Grace and Daniel if Morgan kills her himself. Morgan is about to publicly execute Virginia, but stops himself.

Virginia confesses to Dakota that she is her mother, but Dakota rejects her. Sherry and Strand's groups again demand Virginia be turned over. Morgan refuses; he invites everyone to join his settlement instead. Strand chooses to remain with the Pioneers. Sherry also declines despite Dwight’s pleas.

Alicia and Morgan informs Virginia that she and Dakota are being exiled and will be killed if they return. June stays to treat Virginia’s wound; the two women discuss their history with their respective daughter. Concluding that Virginia’s overprotection of Dakota is what led to John’s death, June turns on Virginia and kills her. Her revenge fulfilled, June leaves the settlement.

== Production ==
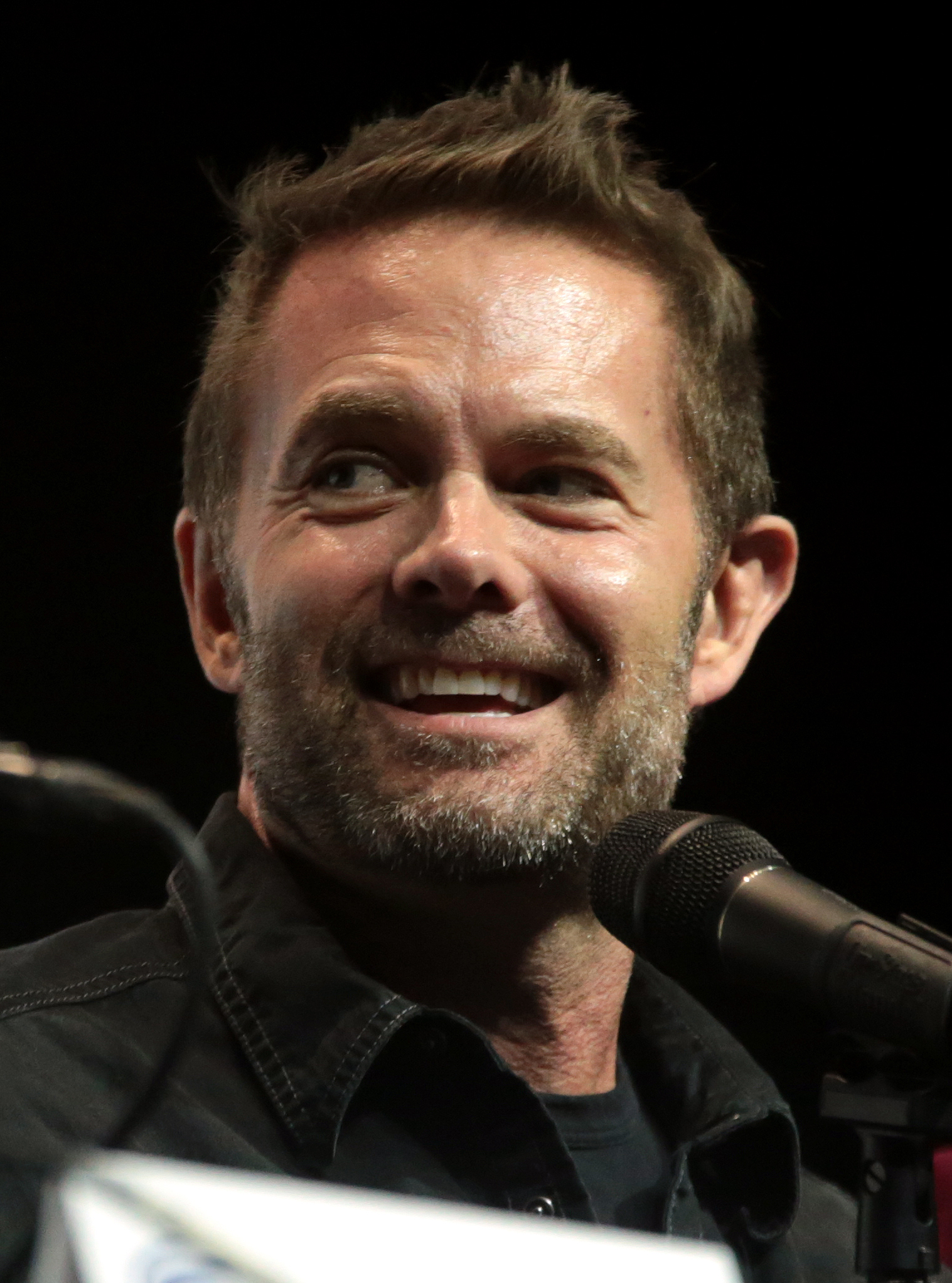
Despite the character being killed in the previous episode, Garret Dillahunt makes his final regular appearance as John Dorie.

The episode marks the final appearance of John Dorie (Garret Dillahunt), who was killed in the previous episode despite his death, the character's corpse and flashbacks appears in the episode. In turn, the episode marks the final appearance of Colby Minifie who portrays Virginia from the previous season in the episode "Things Left to Do ". Virginia is murdered by June Dorie (Jenna Elfman) who blamed her for the death of her husband.

== Reception ==
=== Critical reception ===
David S.E. Zapanta from Den of Geek! rated the episode 3.5 out of 5 and wrote: "It is a busy episode, with lots of competing factions and changes of heart and reunions and partings. Morgan is at the center of the action, of course, and Lennie James works his usual magic with the kind of complex moral dilemmas that have long been Fear's bread and butter." In a positive review, Erik Kain of Forbes said: "All told, this was a pretty decent episode. I didn’t like Virginia as a character and the Rangers/Pioneers are ridiculous from top to bottom so I’m glad to see her gone and her organization decimated."

Writing for "TV Fanatic", Paul Daily gave the episode 4.75 out of 5, considering it "another standout episode, one that will stick with me for years, thanks to the risks the writers are finally taking. The cast is throwing it out of the park, and you can tell they love the material." Emily Hannemann of TV Insider praised the episode, writing "Fear the Walking Dead's sixth season is shaping up to be one of its best, thanks to episodes with major moments like this."

=== Ratings ===
The episode was seen by 1.12 million viewers in the United States on its original air date, below the previous episodes.
