= Fear the Walking Dead season 6 =

Fear the Walking Dead
- Season 6
- Promotional poster
- Showrunners: Andrew Chambliss; Ian Goldberg
- Starring: Lennie James; Alycia Debnam-Carey; Maggie Grace; Colman Domingo; Danay García; Garret Dillahunt; Austin Amelio; Mo Collins; Alexa Nisenson; Karen David; Colby Hollman; Zoe Colletti; Jenna Elfman; Rubén Blades; Christine Evangelista; Keith Carradine
- No. of episodes: 16

Release
- Original network: AMC
- Original release: October 11, 2020 – June 13, 2021

Season chronology
- ← Previous; Season 5 Next → Season 7

The sixth season of Fear the Walking Dead, an American horror-drama television series on AMC, premiered on October 11, 2020, and concluded on June 13, 2021, consisting of sixteen episodes. The series is a companion series to The Walking Dead, which is based on the comic book series of the same name by Robert Kirkman, Tony Moore, and Charlie Adlard. The executive producers are Kirkman, David Alpert, Greg Nicotero, Gale Anne Hurd, Scott M. Gimple, Andrew Chambliss, and Ian B. Goldberg, with Chambliss and Goldberg as showrunners for the third consecutive season.

The season follows Morgan Jones (Lennie James) who has been left for dead by Virginia (Colby Minifie), while the remaining members of Morgan's group have been separated by Virginia and her Pioneers and are dispersed across her various settlements. The season also features multiple time jumps.

== Cast ==
The sixth season featured sixteen actors receiving main cast billing status, with eleven returning from the fifth season, while five new cast members are introduced. Christine Evangelista (who was a recurring cast member in The Walking Dead), moved to the main cast after her departure from The Walking Dead. Mo Collins and Colby Hollman were promoted from recurring status and Zoe Colletti and Keith Carradine were added to the main cast.

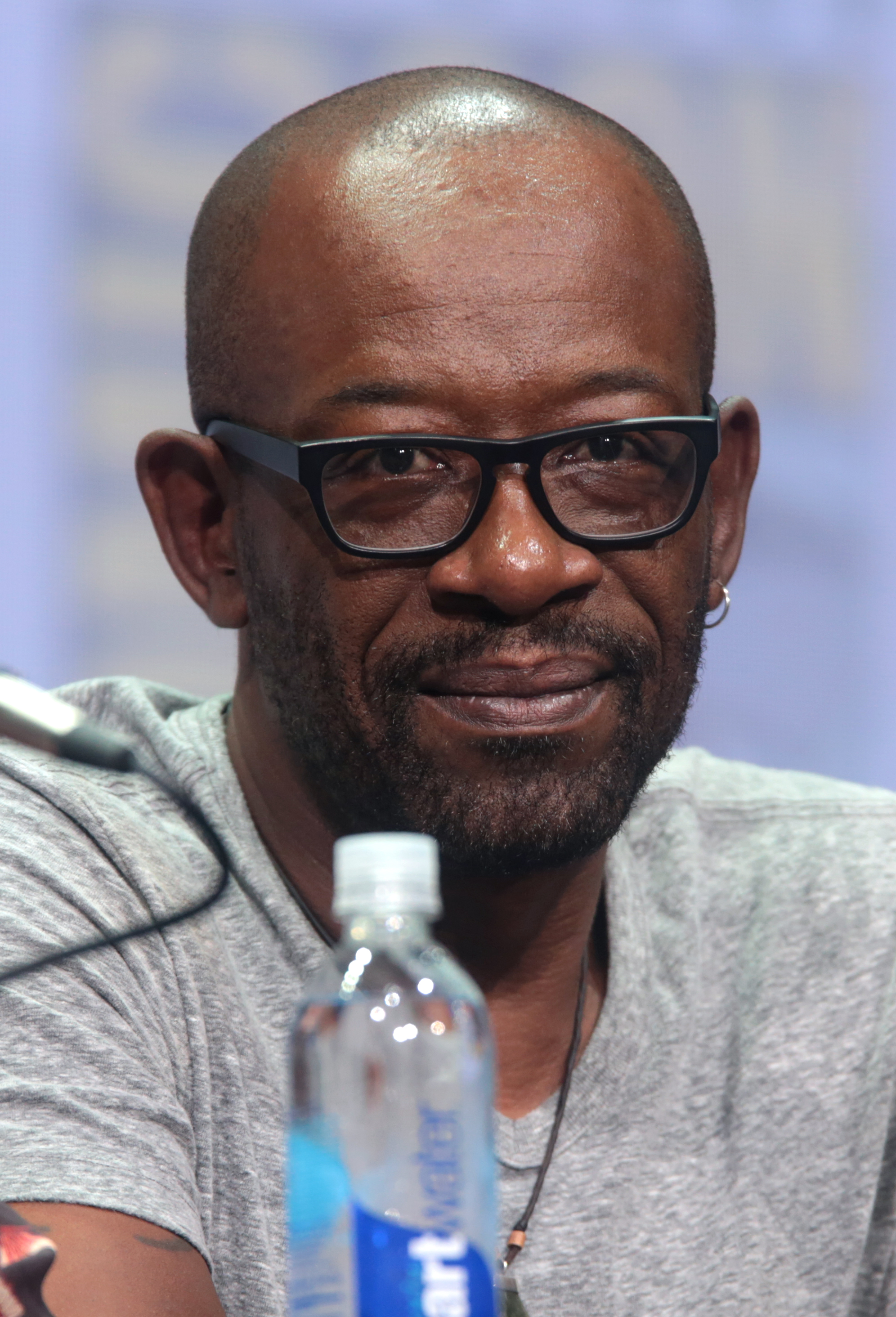
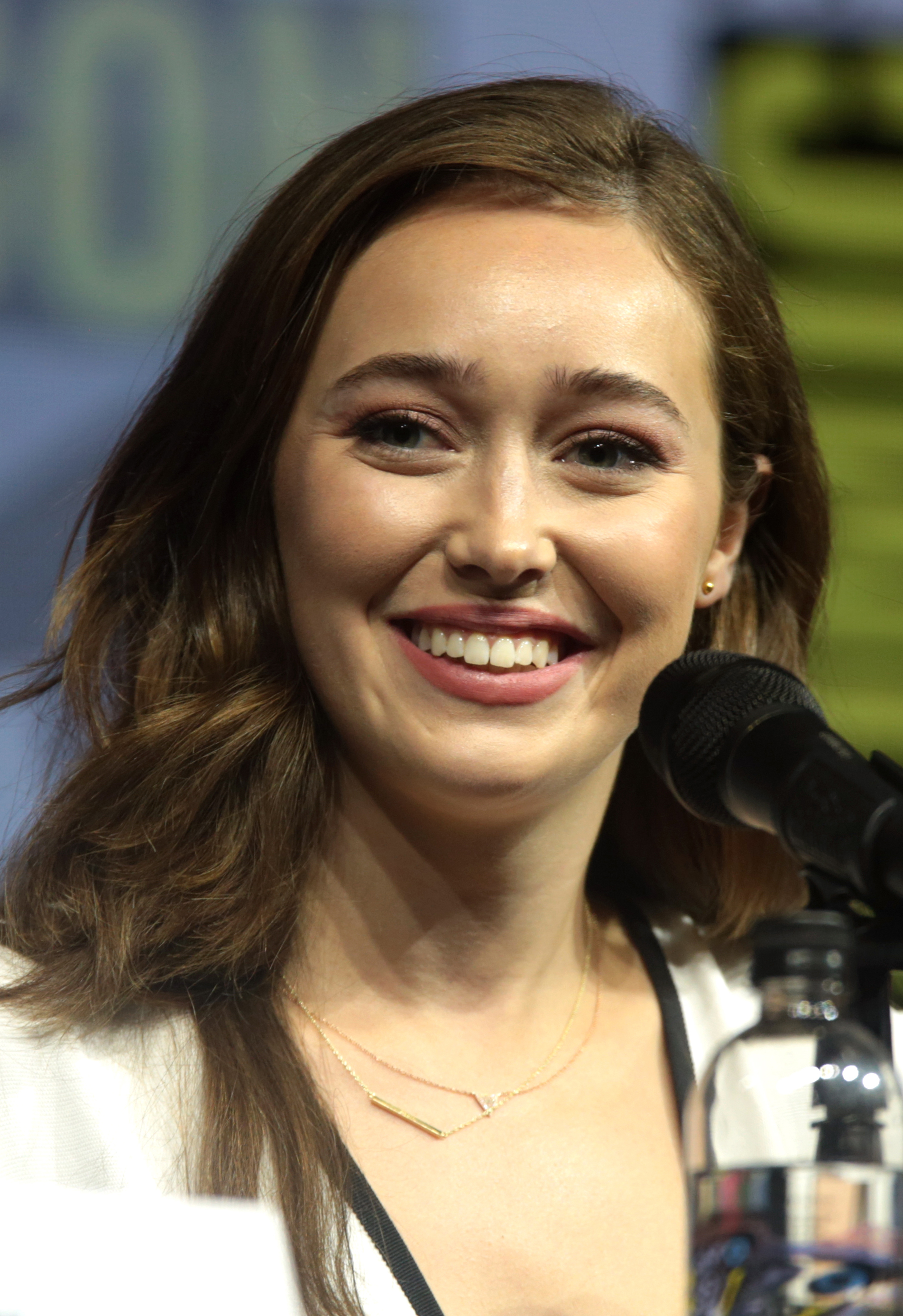
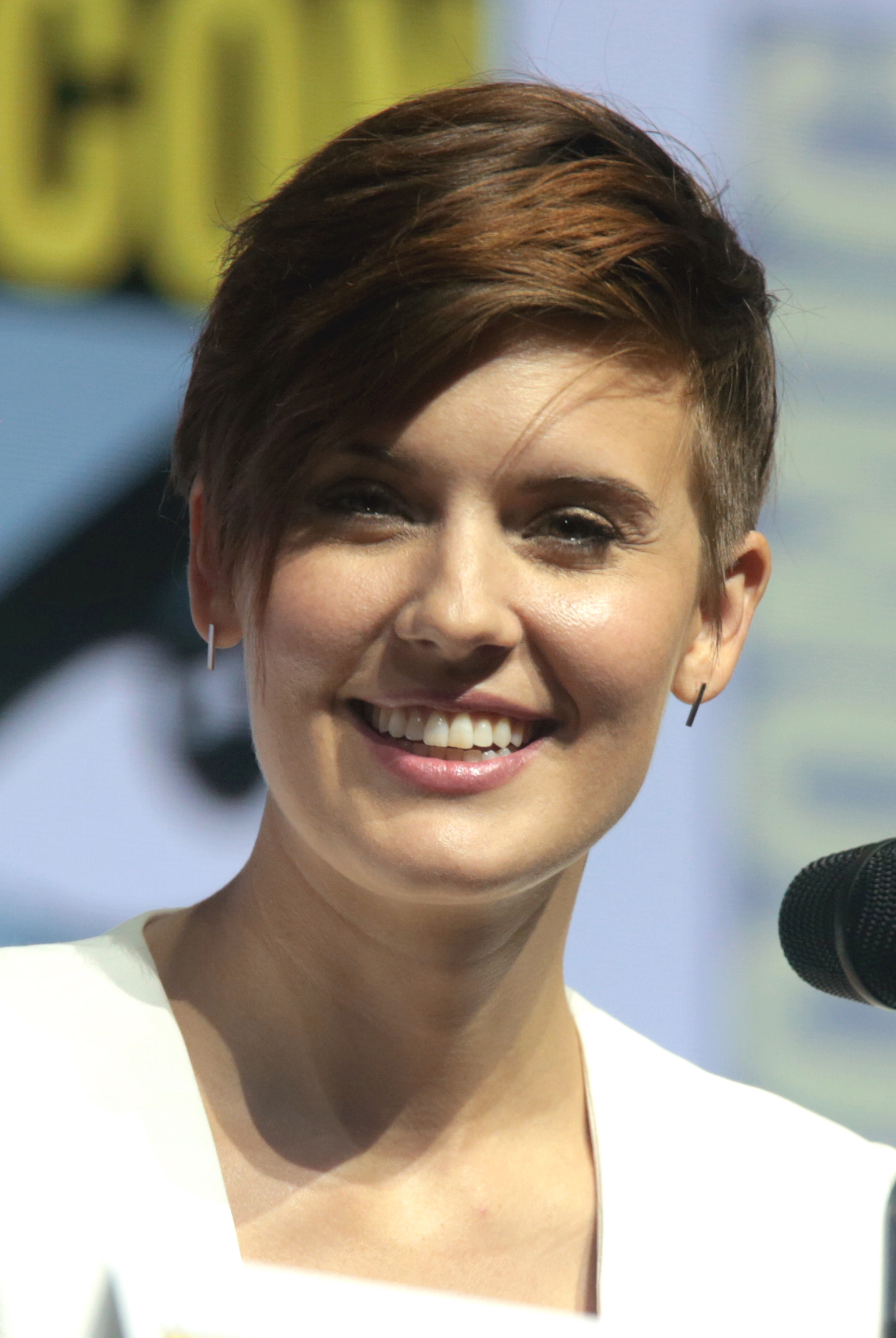
Lennie James (Morgan Jones), Alycia Debnam-Carey (Alicia Clark), and Maggie Grace (Althea Szewczyk-Przygocki)
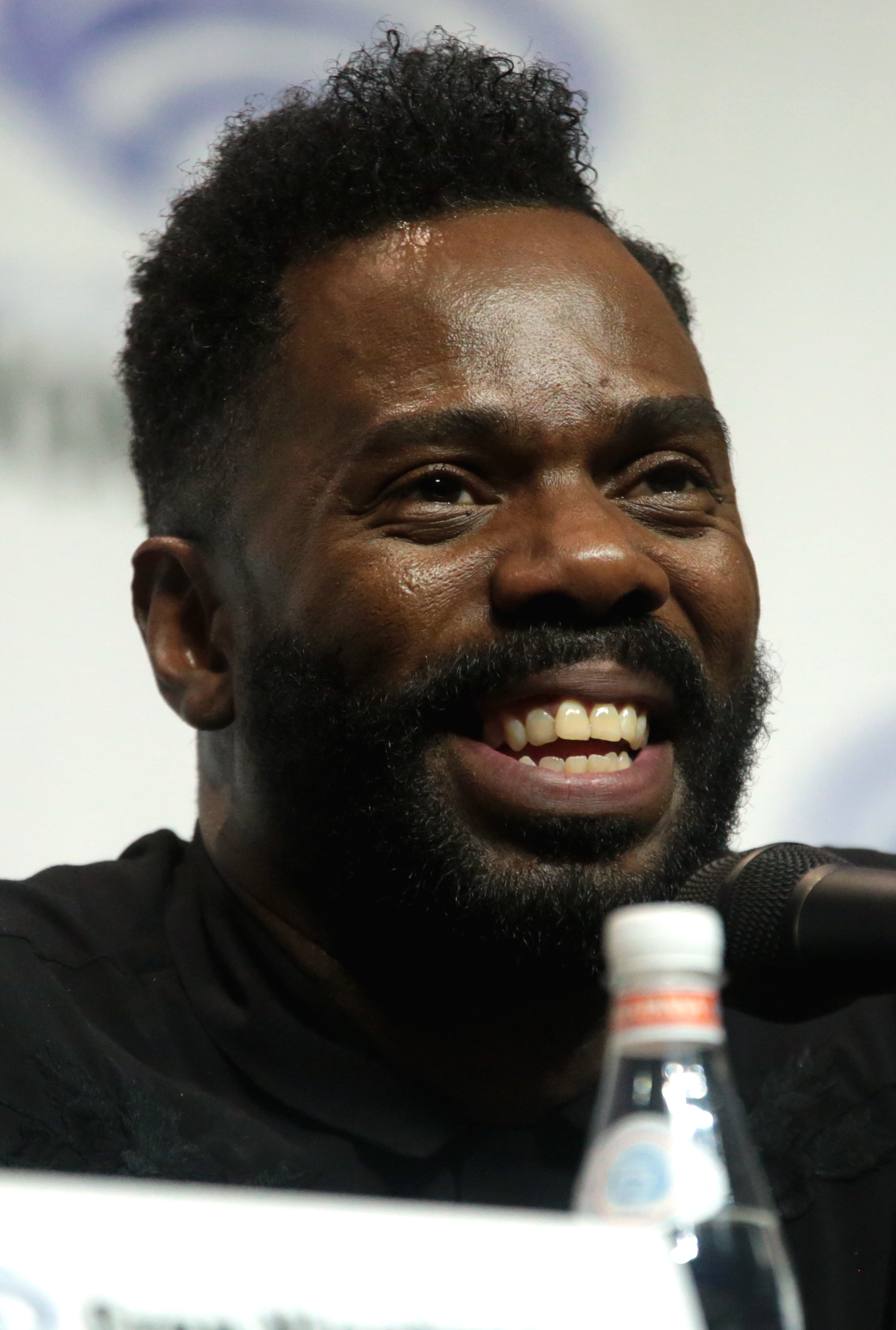
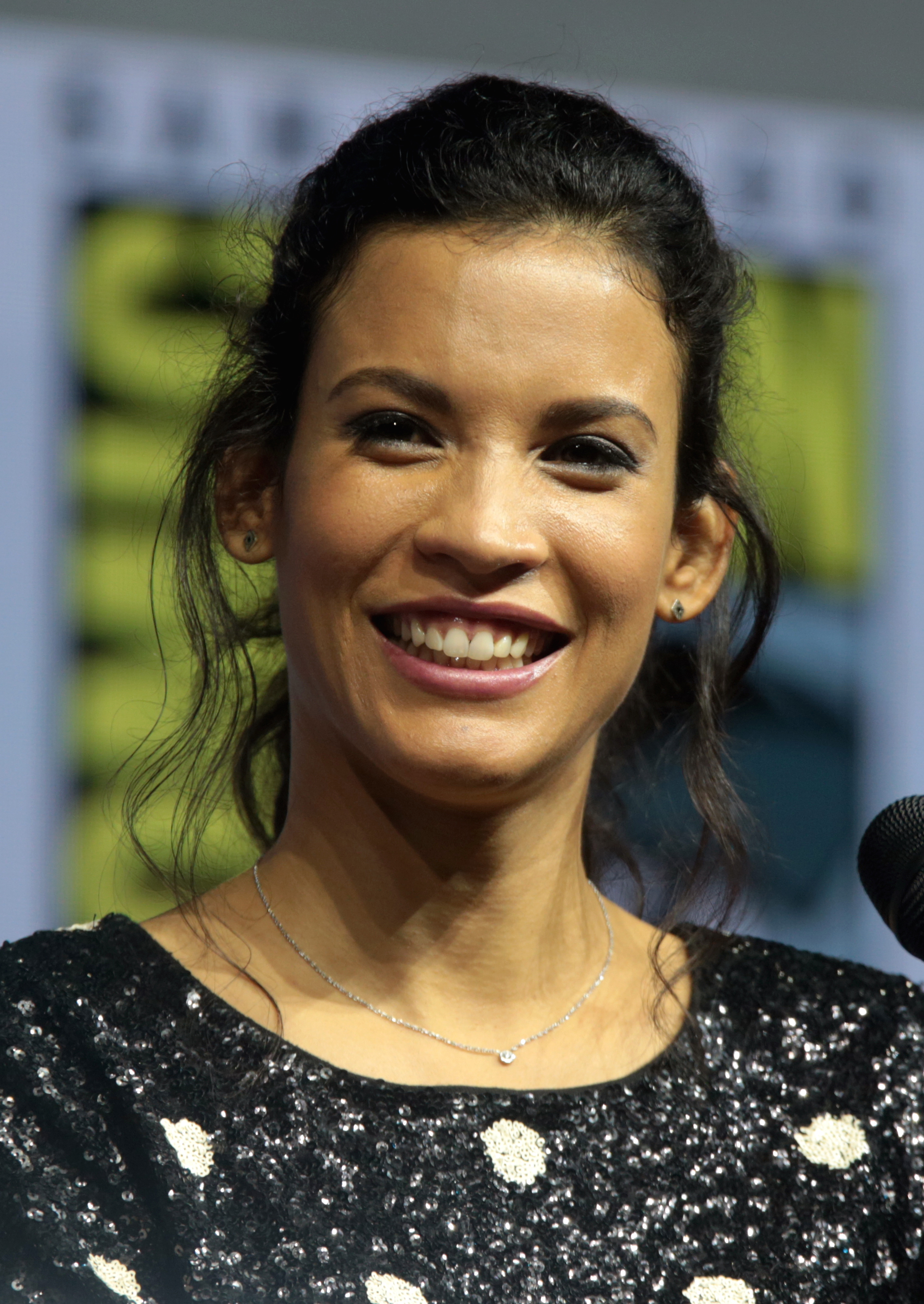
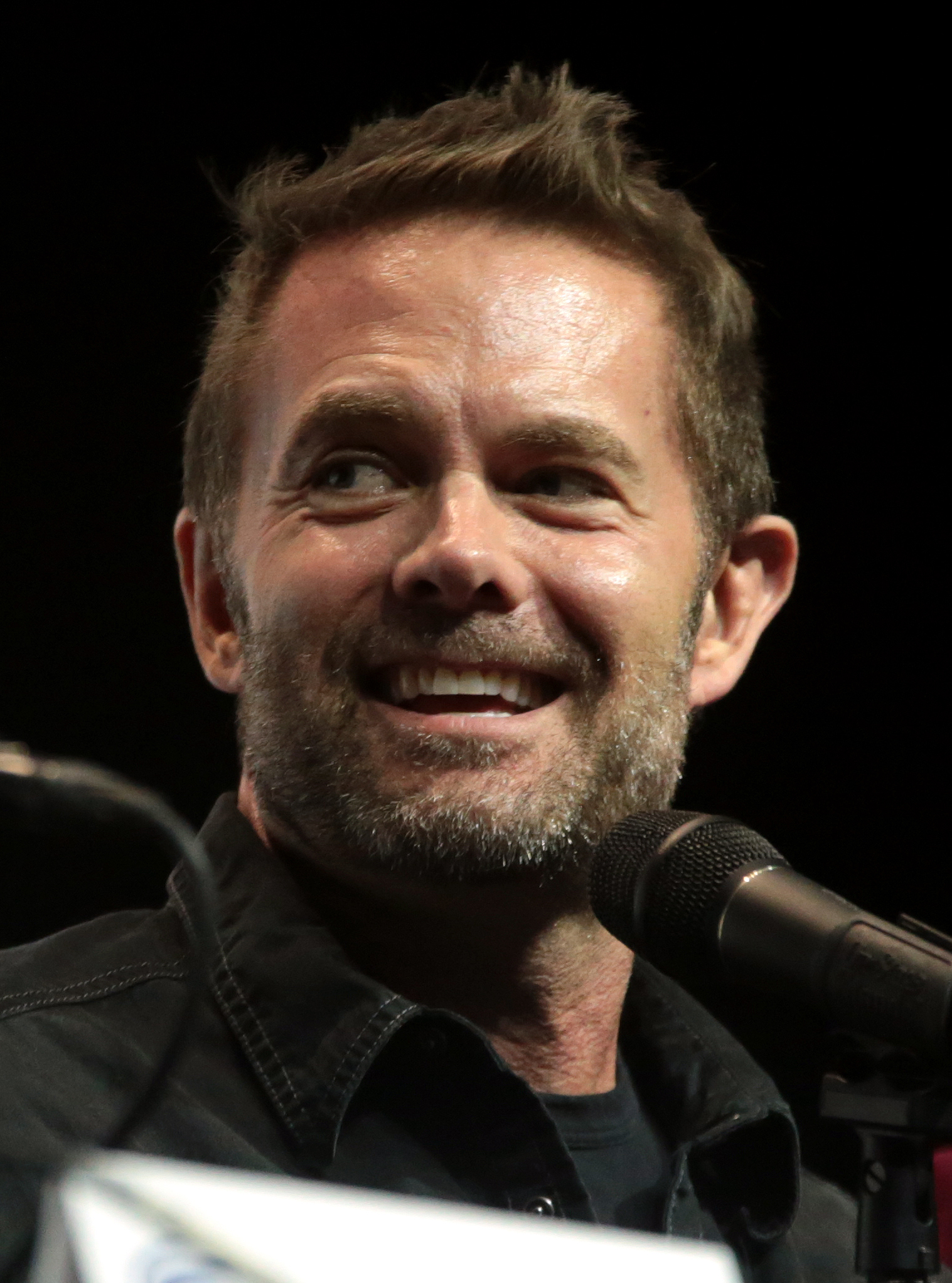
Colman Domingo (Victor Strand), Danay García (Luciana Galvez), and Garret Dillahunt (John Dorie)
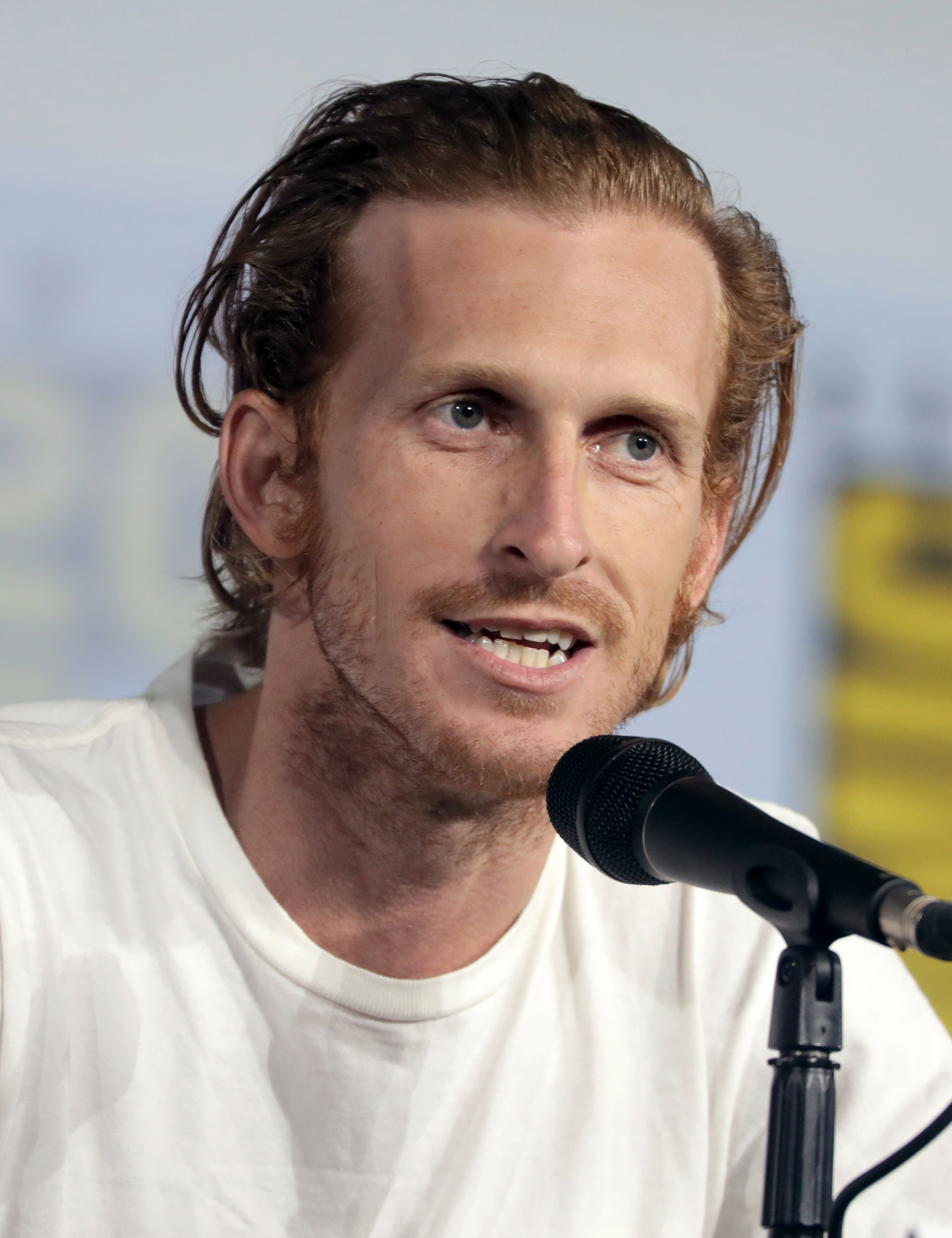
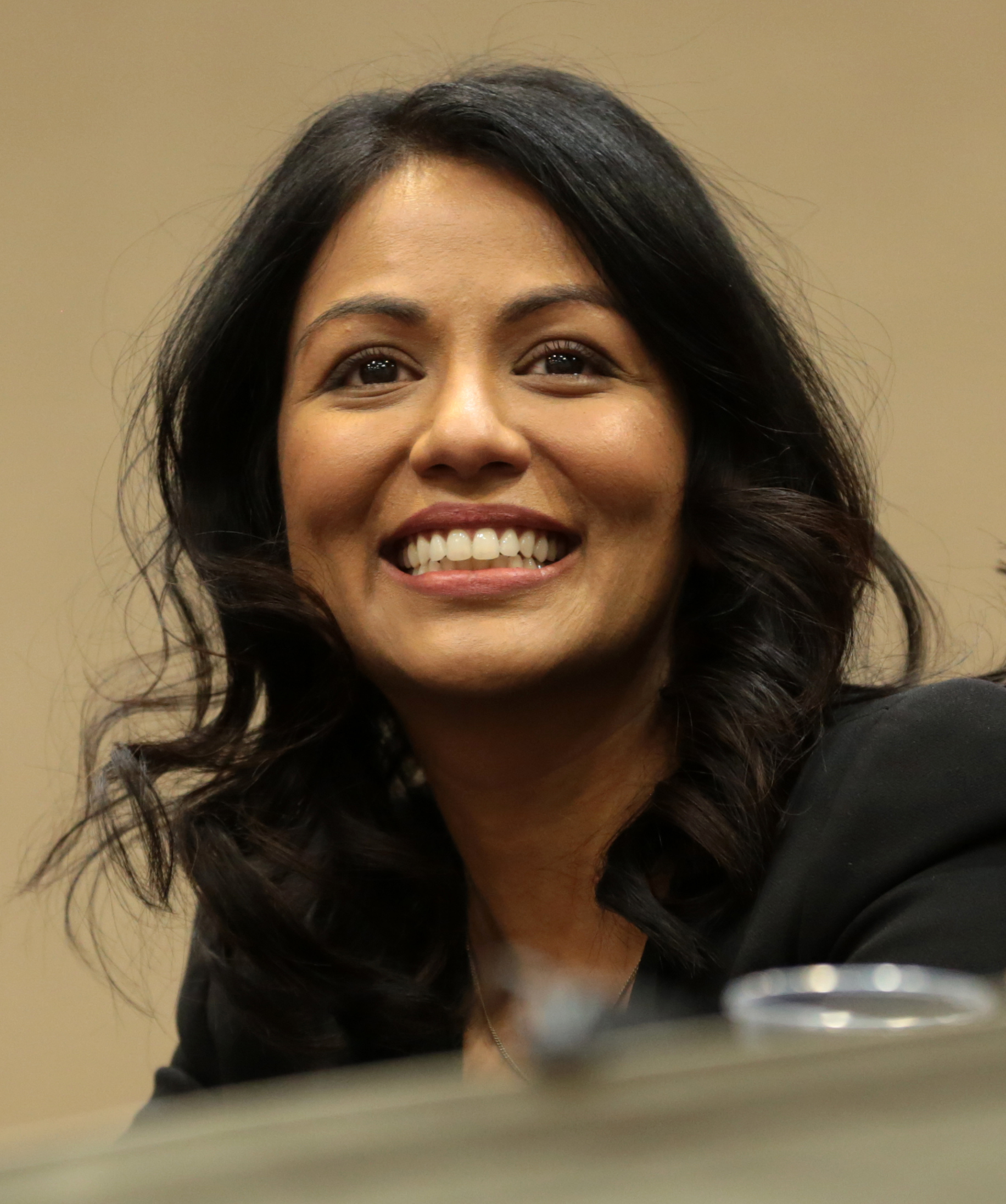
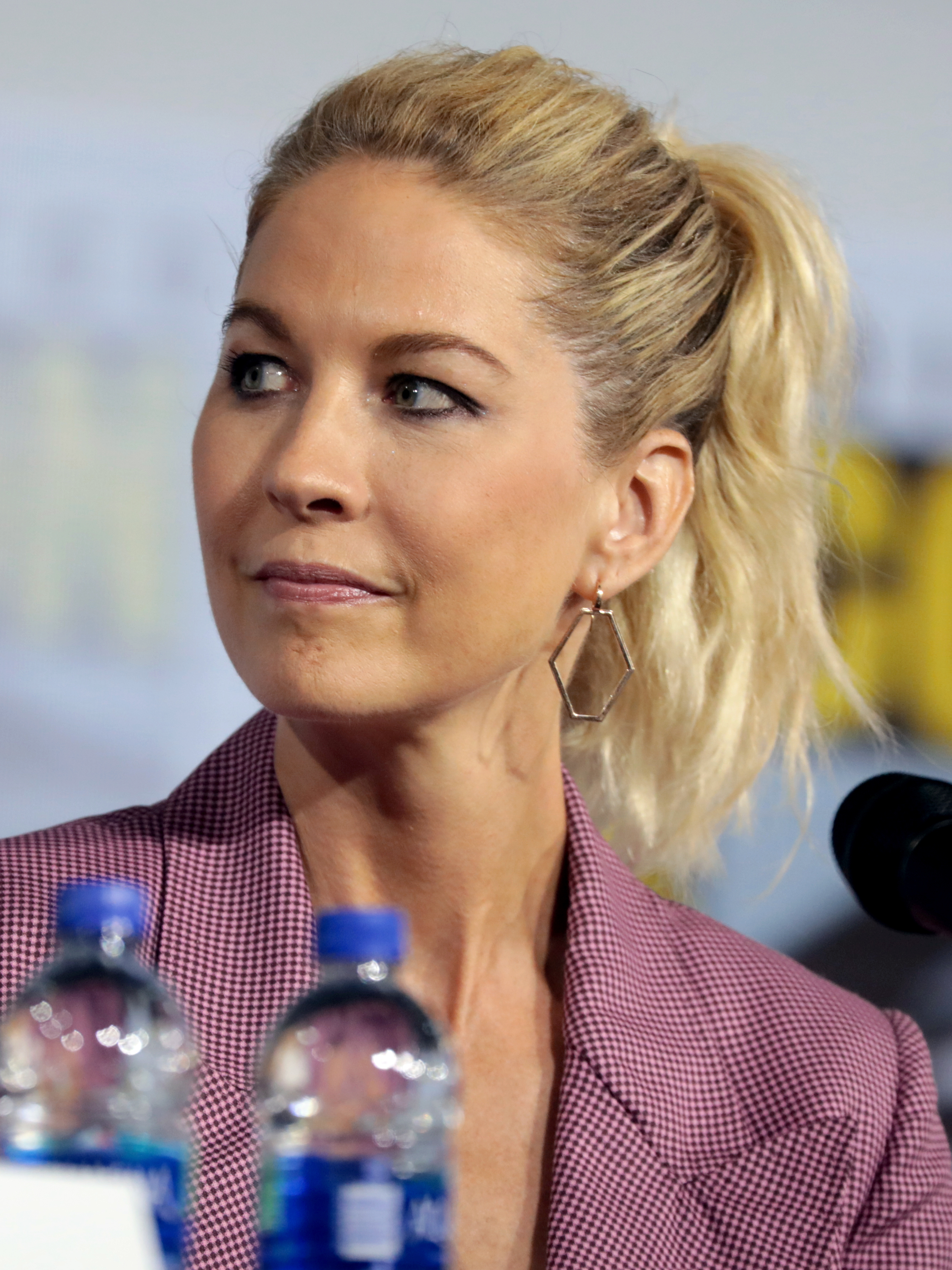
Austin Amelio (Dwight), Karen David (Grace Mukherjee), and Jenna Elfman (June Dorie)
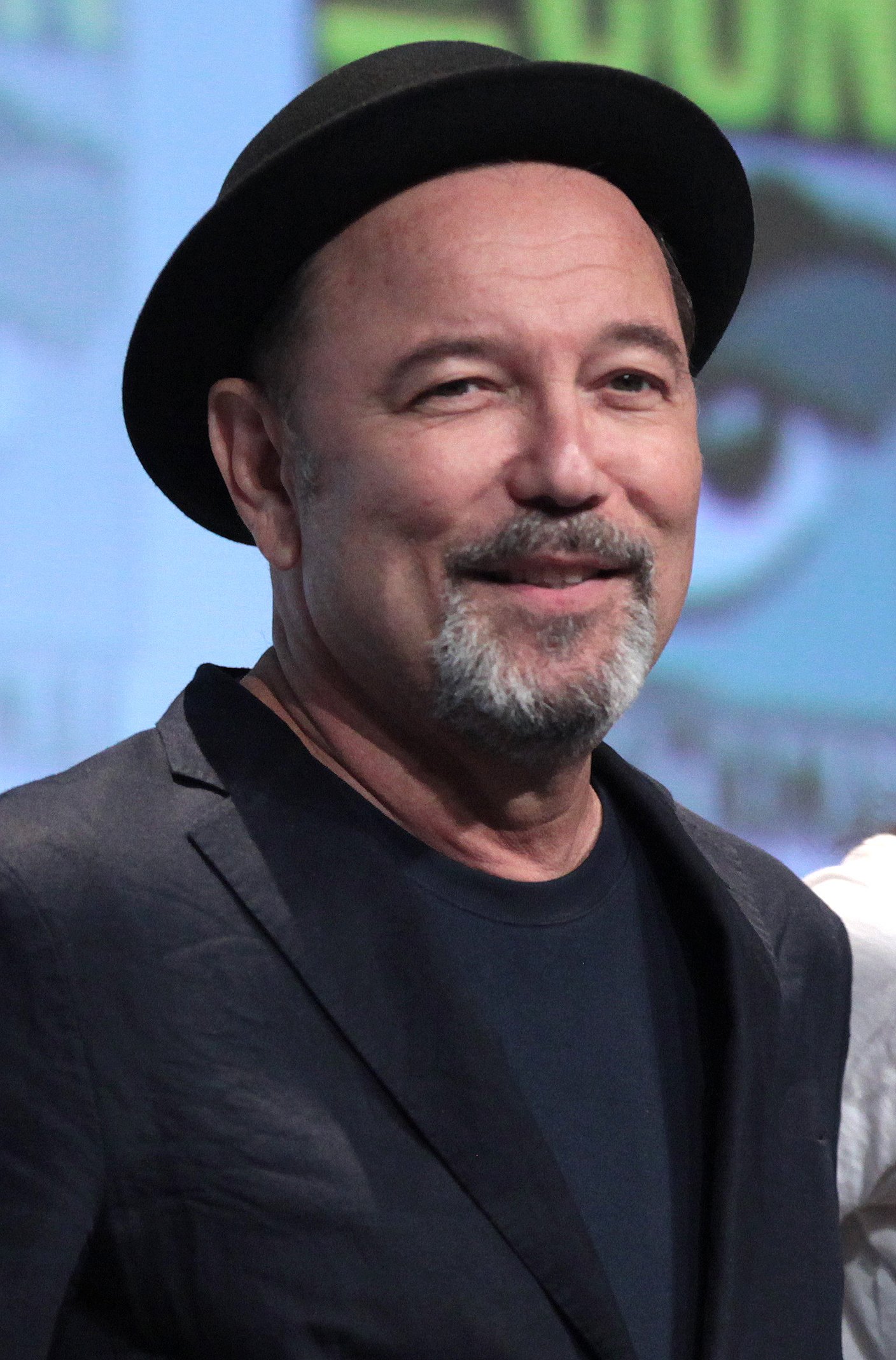
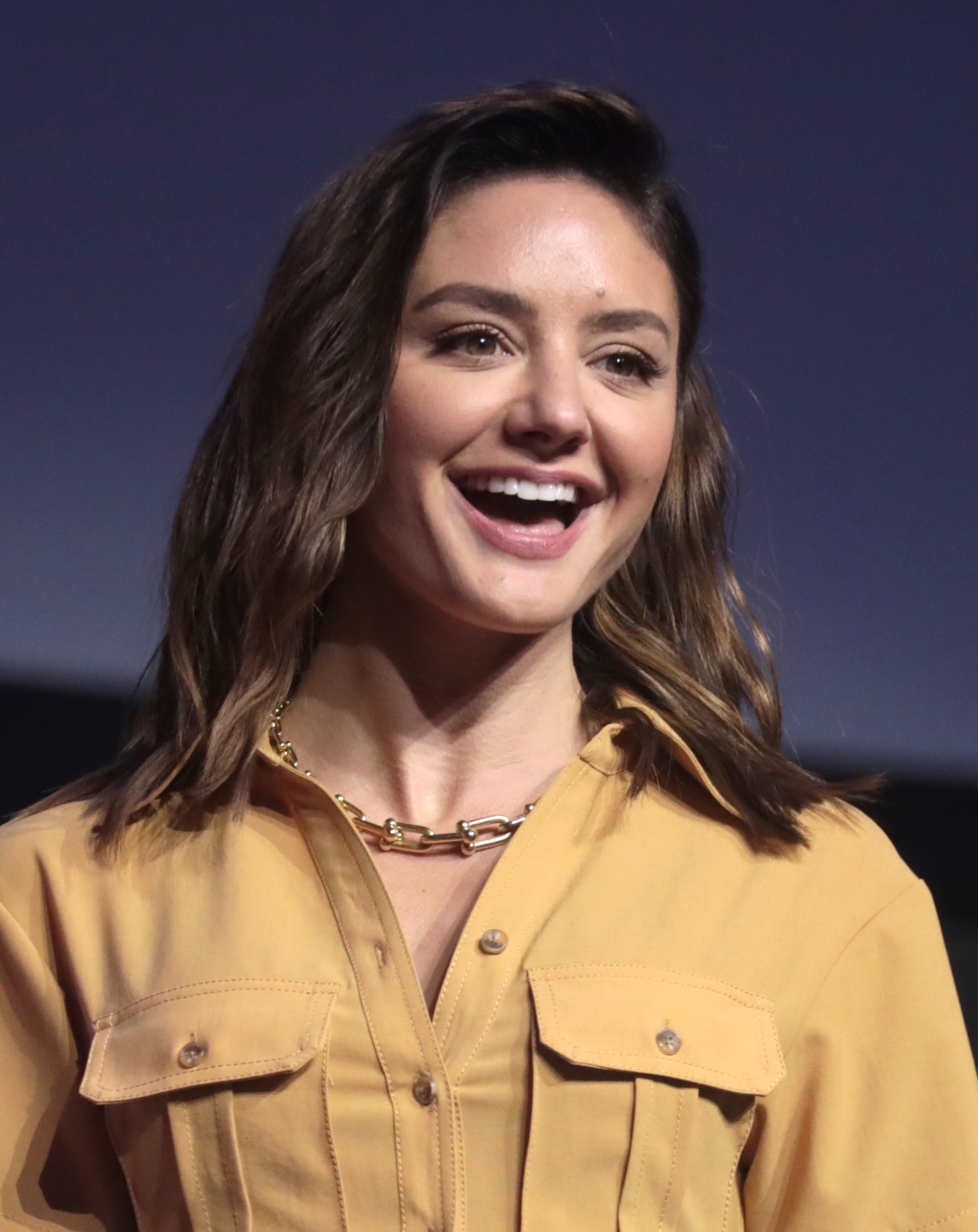
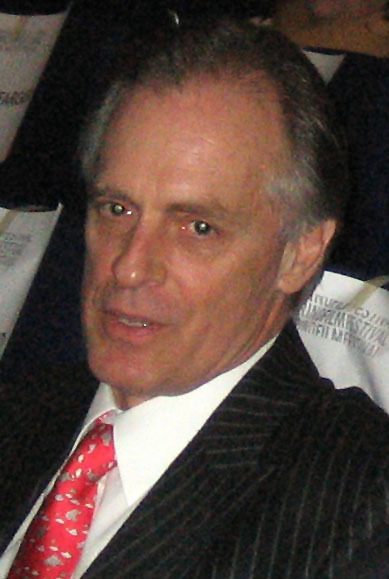
Rubén Blades (Daniel Salazar), Christine Evangelista (Sherry), and Keith Carradine (John Dorie Sr.)

=== Main cast ===
- Lennie James as Morgan Jones: A pragmatic man, formerly a part of Rick Grimes' group on The Walking Dead.
- Alycia Debnam-Carey as Alicia Clark: The fiery yet compassionate daughter of Madison.
- Maggie Grace as Althea "Al" Szewczyk-Przygocki: A curious and tactical journalist.
- Colman Domingo as Victor Strand: A smart and sophisticated conman-turned-businessman, who formed friendships with Madison and Alicia.
- Danay García as Luciana Galvez: A strong and cautious former member of the La Colonia community in Tijuana, Mexico.
- Garret Dillahunt as John Dorie: A lonesome and friendly police officer who is married to June.
- Austin Amelio as Dwight: A reformed former lieutenant of the Saviors, who was exiled from Virginia by Rick Grimes' group on The Walking Dead. He is currently searching for his missing ex-wife Sherry.
- Mo Collins as Sarah Rabinowitz: The adoptive sister of Wendell and a former Marine.
- Alexa Nisenson as Charlie: A young girl who was a spy for the Vultures.
- Karen David as Grace Mukherjee: A woman who used to work at a nuclear power plant that melted down near the site where the plane of Morgan's group crashed.
- Colby Hollman as Wes: A nihilistic painter who allies with Morgan's group.
- Zoe Colletti as Dakota: A member of the Pioneers who is thought to be Virginia's younger sister.
- Jenna Elfman as June Dorie: A kind nurse who is married to John.
- Rubén Blades as Daniel Salazar: A courageous and pragmatic former Sombra Negra member who formed a parental bond with Charlie.
- Christine Evangelista as Sherry: Dwight's long-missing ex-wife who fled across the country to Texas after escaping the Saviors.
- Keith Carradine as John Dorie Sr.: John's father who was also a police officer before the apocalypse.

=== Supporting cast ===
- Colby Minifie as Virginia: An antagonistic leader of the Pioneers who at first was thought to be the older sister of Dakota, but was later revealed to actually be her mother.
- Brigitte Kali Canales as Rachel: A pregnant woman who is Isaac's wife.
- Craig Nigh as Hill: A high-ranking member of the Pioneers.
- Holly Curran as Janis: A woman who called Alicia and Strand for help and was saved by Wes. She later joined Morgan's group. She is Tom's sister.
- Justin Smith as Marcus: An arrogant member of the Pioneers.
- Peter Jacobson as Jacob Kessner: A rabbi who joins Morgan's group.
- Cory Hart as Rollie: A former member of Logan's crew, who works with a group of survivors to destroy the Pioneers.
- Daryl Mitchell as Wendell: The adoptive brother of Sarah who uses a wheelchair.
- John Glover as Theodore "Teddy" Maddox: The leader of the Doomsday cult who intends to exterminate all life on the surface. He is also a serial killer who was hunted down and imprisoned by John Dorie Sr. in the 1970s.
- Nick Stahl as Jason Riley: A high-ranking member of the Doomsday cult who is one of Teddy's devoted followers. Before the apocalypse, he was the weapons officer onboard the USS Pennsylvania.

=== Guest cast ===
- Demetrius Grosse as Emile LaRoux: A bounty hunter hired by Virginia to hunt down Morgan.
- Michael Abbott Jr. as Isaac: A desperate survivor who Morgan encountered.
- Damon Carney as Walter: A fugitive who is running from Emile. He is also a former crewmember on the USS Pennsylvania.
- Devyn Tyler as Nora: A woman who is one of the remaining survivors living in an office building where she once worked.
- Raphael Sbarge as Ed: A taxidermist who lives in an old hunting lodge.
- Chinaza Uche as Derek: A member of the Doomsday cult and Wes' brother.
- Sahana Srinivasan as Athena Mukherjee: The teenage daughter of Grace who appears during a dream sequence.
- Sebastian Sozzi as Cole: A survivor who was once a part of the Dell Diamond Baseball Stadium community and who was believed to have died when it was destroyed.
- Rhoda Griffis as Vivian: Douglas' wife who was once a part of the Dell Diamond Baseball Stadium community and who was believed to have died when it was destroyed.
- Kenneth Wayne Bradley as Douglas: Vivian's husband who was once a part of the Dell Diamond Baseball Stadium community and who was believed to have died when it was destroyed.
- Omid Abtahi as Howard: A former history teacher who Strand met when he was hiding from the nuclear blast.

== Episodes ==
No. overall	No. in season	Title	Directed by	Written by	Original release date	U.S. viewers (millions)
70	1	"The End Is the Beginning"	Michael E. Satrazemis	Andrew Chambliss & Ian Goldberg	October 11, 2020	1.59
Several weeks after being shot by Virginia, Morgan has managed to escape the Pioneers' grasp, but is in bad health from his gunshot wound that has become infected and gangrenous. Virginia hires a bounty hunter, Emile, to find and kill Morgan. While scavenging for supplies, Morgan meets Isaac, who helps him hide from Emile. Isaac takes Morgan to a hidden valley where his pregnant wife, Rachel, is located. Emile finds Morgan, but Isaac rescues him and reveals that he was previously bitten prior to meeting him. Morgan kills Emile and steals his clothes, axe, and a key he was carrying with him. The next day, Morgan awakens to find the bullet extracted and that Isaac died from his infection, but not before Rachel gave birth to a girl, named Morgan. Morgan leaves the head of the bounty hunter for Virginia to find, leaving her stunned. Morgan tells Virginia over the radio, "Morgan Jones is dead. You're dealing with somebody else now." Elsewhere on a beach, a man spray paints "THE END IS THE BEGINNING" on a washed-up submarine. He speaks to another man, who says "they" should have arrived by now, and they need the key.
71	2	"Welcome to the Club"	Lennie James	Nazrin Choudhury	October 18, 2020	1.55
After an incident with a high-ranking member of the Pioneers, Alicia and Strand are taken to a warehouse to eliminate a large herd of walkers, and are later joined by Charlie and Janis. Meanwhile, Daniel appears to be suffering from amnesia, causing confusion among his allies. Dakota, Virginia's younger sister, joins them in clearing the walkers, and inadvertently kills two of the Pioneers. In the midst of the battle, Strand secretly stabs a fellow prisoner, Sanjay, and sacrifices him to the walkers in order to gain the upper hand. Later, Virginia praises Strand for his work as a leader, and gives him an important position for the community. Strand, feeling guilty for his role in Sanjay's death, assigns Alicia to another settlement. That night, Daniel is attacked by a walker, but is saved by Morgan, and reveals he still has his memory.
72	3	"Alaska"	Colman Domingo	Mallory Westfall	October 25, 2020	1.50
Morgan returns to the valley hideout, bringing Rachel and her baby food and other supplies. He tells her he has a man on the inside (Daniel), and vows to save his friends, rebuilding his signature staff into the new handle of his axe. Elsewhere, Virginia assigns Althea and Dwight to investigate various locations, and document the walkers and how they may have died. While at a funeral home, Althea hears Isabelle on her walkie-talkie discussing a nearby rendezvous point. Dwight overhears this and together they head to the building where Isabelle plans to land her helicopter. As they ascend the building, they find numerous rats and "THE END IS THE BEGINNING" spray painted on a wall. Eventually, they come across a group living there who are suffering from the bubonic plague. The group's leader, Nora, warns them not to continue to the helipad, saying the last time the helicopter arrived, one of her friends was shot. Despite Dwight's pleas, Althea continues to the roof, and later notices that Dwight himself is infected. The two are later saved from walkers by Nora, who leads Althea to the roof. While anxiously waiting for Isabelle, she has a change of heart and fires a flare gun; she then warns Isabelle via the walkie-talkie (without revealing her identity) to not fly to the building due to the plague. Isabelle thanks her, and leads her to a supply crate containing beer and medicine for Nora's group. Afterwards, Althea confides in Dwight her belief that the rats were planted to spread the sickness. Once they leave, Althea hears a woman on her walkie-talkie who saw the flare, and is about to arrive at the building. The woman turns out to be Sherry, who is finally reunited with Dwight.
73	4	"The Key"	Ron Underwood	David Johnson	November 1, 2020	1.28
John begins to read the letter that he wrote to June. Suddenly, he feels pain in his teeth and realizes he has a cavity. One morning, a ranger named Cameron does not show up for his shift, confusing John. Suspicious, John checks behind his house, finding an undead Cameron entangled in barbed wire with two walkers. During his investigation, John finds an earring at the crime scene. During Cameron's funeral, Janis tries to flee the settlement, but is caught. Janis, who was secretly dating Cameron, takes credit for the murder and is executed by the Pioneers by tying her to a tree outside with a radio blaring loud music, attracting nearby walkers who swiftly dismember and devour her. Later, John finds Janis' zombified remains and puts her down. On his way back to Humbug's Gulch to search for answers, Morgan is struck by another car. He steps out and walks to the driver's seat of the other car, watching the man from the car stumble out. Morgan holds him at axe point, questioning if it was an accident. The man's companion stumbles out also, getting behind him. The men threaten Morgan, asking where Emile is and then demanding the key from him. A fight ensues, with Morgan killing them both. He looks down at the key he was wearing around his neck and wonders what it's for.
74	5	"Honey"	Michael E. Satrazemis	Ashley Cardiff	November 8, 2020	1.24
Dwight and Sherry are spending a night together, when Sherry gets up and seemingly disappears. Dwight hears noises outside and is captured by a group of masked men. The next day, Dwight appears in a skatepark with the men, where Sherry confesses that she is a part of their group. They plan to destroy the SWAT truck, but Althea, who has also been captured, suggests they steal it instead. The assault on the truck is successful with the unexpected help of Morgan. At night, Sherry tells Morgan she plans to kill Virginia, but Morgan refuses to participate, due to his experience in the war against Negan. He reveals his plan to make a new community away from the Pioneers. Sherry convinces Dwight to ambush Virginia's henchmen and proceeds into the trap. Shortly after seeing that Morgan and Althea refuse to attack the Pioneers, she locks them up with Dwight. Morgan convinces Dwight to stop Sherry, who reluctantly cancels the attack with Virginia not even showing up. The next day, Morgan and Althea convince Dwight to leave with them, but Sherry refuses to join, intending to continue her war against the Pioneers. When the refugees from the office building arrive, they depart for the hidden valley, and Dwight leaves Sherry a clue to give her their whereabouts.
75	6	"Bury Her Next to Jasper's Leg"	Sharat Raju	Alex Delyle	November 15, 2020	1.27
June and Sarah now run a mobile clinic, but have a slew of bad luck with saving people, including losing a man to a burst appendix. June is reunited with John, who attempts to convince her to flee to his cabin with him, but they are interrupted by a message from Luciana of a disaster at Tank Town due to a new well exploding. Virginia, John, June, Sarah, Luciana and the Pioneers work to save the survivors of the disaster, but a spray painted message reading "THE END IS THE BEGINNING" convinces Virginia that it was not an accident. Finding a wounded Wes' art supplies, Virginia tortures him for answers, believing him to be responsible before being stopped by June. The two women are trapped by an explosion and Virginia is bitten in the hand. June hesitates to amputate it, blaming Virginia for everything going wrong around them, but Virginia insists there is a bigger threat than her and that her methods are geared towards protecting the people in her communities. June reluctantly saves Virginia, who agrees to give June her own hospital. Tank Town is destroyed, and in the aftermath, June refuses to leave with John, instead intending to build her hospital with the help of Luciana, Sarah, Wes and Wendell. Though devastated by June's choice, John nevertheless decides to enact his escape plan on his own.
76	7	"Damage from the Inside"	Tawnia McKiernan	Jacob Pinion	November 22, 2020	1.09
A convoy of rangers escorting Dakota to a safe house are attacked and killed, leaving Strand and another ranger named Samuels as the only survivors. Strand enlists the help of Alicia and Charlie to find Dakota, whom they locate at an old hunting lodge occupied by a taxidermist named Ed. Alicia contacts Virginia and offers to trade Dakota for their freedom, intending to retake the stadium they previously lived at, but Ed snaps, draws the walkers in and refuses to let them leave. During a scuffle, he is accidentally impaled on antlers by Alicia and sacrifices himself to the approaching walkers, telling Alicia that his family's deaths were his fault and to not make his mistakes. Morgan shows up and helps Alicia put down the walkers, but he intends to trade Dakota for the rest of their people, leading to an argument when Alicia realizes that Morgan attacked the convoy. Morgan agrees to take Dakota with them to the community he is building, but Strand refuses to join and remains with the Pioneers. Virginia leads Strand to a visibly-pregnant Grace, who tells him that she wants him to get everybody back that Virginia took from Humbug's Gulch.
77	8	"The Door"	Michael E. Satrazemis	Ian Goldberg & Andrew Chambliss	April 11, 2021	1.17
At his cabin, John prepares to commit suicide, but is stopped by walkers washing up outside. Investigating, John discovers Morgan and Dakota hiding from Virginia's Rangers and a herd they had barricaded on the only bridge out of the area. Depressed, John agrees to help them pass through the herd, but refuses to join Morgan's new community despite constant attempts to convince him otherwise. Virginia makes contact with Morgan, revealing that she is holding Grace, Daniel, Sarah, June and Wes hostage to ensure Dakota's safety. Ranger Marcus finds John's cabin, forcing John to kill him in order to save Morgan. By attaching doors to the front of an old truck, the three are able to plow their way through the herd and eliminate it, but Morgan sets up a meeting with Virginia at John's cabin in order to force him to come out of hiding. As Morgan leaves to contact the others, John discovers that Dakota was the one who had murdered Cameron and she shoots him in order to protect her secret. Confronted by Morgan, Dakota reveals that she was the one who had saved him at Humbug's Gulch, as she believes that only Morgan can stop Virginia. Alerted by Morgan, June and Virginia find John washed up outside of his cabin, but he has already died and reanimated, forcing a devastated June to put him down.
78	9	"Things Left to Do"	Michael E. Satrazemis	Nick Bernardone	April 18, 2021	1.12
A heartbroken June buries John and demands answers from Virginia, but she claims to not know anything. That night, Virginia interrogates Daniel, Sarah, Wes, Grace and Luciana to find out Morgan's location, but he shows up and reveals Virginia's crimes. Strand shoots Virginia in the arm and some Pioneers begin to mutiny. Morgan captures Virginia, but the following day they are caught by Sherry and Strand, who demand justice. Virginia accepts her fate, but Morgan can't bring himself to execute her. Morgan convinces Strand and Sherry not to kill her, and instead imprisons her. Virginia reveals to Dakota that she is her mother and not her sister. June appears in Virginia's cell and blames her for John's death and everything that has happened to their group since the events at the Gulch. She kills Virginia and leaves the community.
79	10	"Handle with Care"	Heather Cappiello	Ashley Cardiff & David Johnson	April 25, 2021	1.10
In the present, Daniel is in a cell getting a cognitive test. In a series of flashbacks, Morgan talks to Sherry and Strand about a possible new threat. Daniel is tasked with keeping guns within the community inside a locked shack. Grace begins to have contractions. Morgan leaves to get medical supplies, and puts Daniel in charge. Daniel leads a meeting with Dakota to obtain information on the new threat, which is the group who attacked Tank Town. The meeting ends when there is an explosion that draws in walkers. Daniel goes to the shack and finds the guns are gone. Daniel tells Charlie and Grace to hide and wait for Morgan to return. Daniel allows several walkers to enter the community to find out who has the weapons and believes it to be Strand, who saves Dwight by killing a walker with a pistol. Daniel locks up Strand, but Strand insists he's innocent. When Daniel is about to kill Strand, Morgan returns and kills the walkers. The group discovers that Daniel was the one who hid the weapons, and they imprison him. June, who has been interrogating Daniel, believes he is suffering from a psychological disorder. Strand invites him to live in Lawton, while Dakota shares intel from the late Virginia that the new threat is believed to be hiding underground.
80	11	"The Holding"	K.C. Colwell	Channing Powell	May 2, 2021	1.03
Posing as new recruits, Alicia, Althea, Luciana and Wes infiltrate a subterranean settlement called "The Holding", where workers turn walkers into soil to garden and grow food. They notice a mural with "THE END IS THE BEGINNING" message on it. After being greeted by a worker named Riley, they are interrogated to provide information for the group's leader, Teddy. Later, a group of people arrive, including Wes' brother Derek, whom Wes thought had died long ago. Wes tries to get intel from Derek, but Derek claims Wes "isn't ready yet". While Derek is gone, Wes and Althea search Derek's room and find maps of local settlements, including Tank Town and Lawton, as well as whereabouts of Isabelle's group. Wes confronts Derek about why his group is attacking settlements; Derek explains the only way the world can start over is by destroying everything and everyone above ground. The group tries to escape and take Derek with them, but are caught by Riley, who takes them to an embalming room. He offers to spare their lives if they reveal Morgan's location. They all refuse, but Derek gets Riley's permission to try and show Wes "the truth". Derek takes Wes to a displayed walker, and Wes realizes that Derek knew he was at Tank Town during the attack. A struggle ensues. Wes overpowers Derek and slams him into the walker. The walker bites Derek, killing him. Wes returns to his friends and holds Riley at gunpoint. They flee into a room filled with embalmed walkers; Alicia cuts several open to release the embalming fluid and sets the compound on fire while the others escape back to the dam settlement. Morgan vows to rescue Alicia. Back at The Holding, Alicia meets Teddy, who is upset that she destroyed everything he was working towards, but admits he's been looking for someone like her for a long time.
81	12	"In Dreams"	Michael E. Satrazemis	Andrew Chambliss & Ian Goldberg & Nazrin Choudhury	May 9, 2021	0.99
Sixteen years in the future, Grace awakens to find that she had died giving birth to her daughter Athena and that her friends are all thriving. Traveling with Athena, Grace notices inconsistencies in the world and realizes that she is actually unconscious and dreaming following an explosion set by Riley and the doomsday cult who are seeking the mysterious key that Morgan had taken from Emile. Hunted by the cultists, Grace makes her way through her dream world, bonding with her daughter and evading Riley's forces, convinced that she needs to wake up to give birth to Athena, but that she won't survive it. In the real world, Morgan takes shelter with Grace in a veterinarian's office and stables, killing Riley's men and forcing Riley to flee. As her heart stops in the real world, Grace says goodbye to Morgan and Athena and walks into the light only to revive in the real world. Riley returns and demands the key at gunpoint and Grace has Morgan give it to him, convinced from her dream that her daughter will bring everyone together and it won't matter. Grace gives birth to Athena, but Grace and Morgan are devastated when Athena is stillborn due to absorbing the deadly radiation in her mother's body.
82	13	"J.D."	Aisha Tyler	Nick Bernardone & Jacob Pinion	May 16, 2021	1.09
With Morgan blaming her for Athena's death, June decides to seek out clues on the doomsday cult, followed by Dwight and Sherry who reveals that she wishes to return to Virginia and kill Negan. Outside of Tank Town, the trio are ambushed by a man in an RV who abducts June and reveals that he is also investigating the cult; the man proves to be John Dorie's long-estranged father John Dorie Sr. John identifies Teddy as Theodore Maddox, a serial killer and cult leader whom he had sent to prison in the 1970s, but abandoned his family out of guilt afterwards as John had to plant evidence in order to get Teddy convicted; Teddy somehow escaped from prison after the end of the world. June realizes that Virginia's former lieutenant Hill is holed up at her husband's cabin and convinces John to return there to find out what Hill knows, but John locks her up rather than risk June's life. Hill proves not to know much and nearly kills John before June, having been rescued by Dwight and Sherry, kills him. In the aftermath, Sherry gives up on revenge and rekindles her relationship with Dwight before the four hold a funeral for their fallen friend with June finally reading the letter that her husband had left for her. Returning to Morgan's community, John warns that Teddy intends to kill everyone still left alive in the world and that they must begin preparing to put an end to him.
83	14	"Mother"	Janice Cooke	Channing Powell & Alex Delyle	May 23, 2021	0.94
In a flashback, Teddy escapes from prison after it falls during the beginning of the apocalypse due to an executed prisoner turning into a zombie. In the present, as the cult prepares to move to a new home, Teddy decides to take Alicia and a recently-joining Dakota to recover and move his mother's body with Alicia holding off on killing Teddy until she learns of his plans. After running into a spike strip, Alicia is reunited with Cole whom she had believed died when the stadium fell. Cole reveals that Madison's sacrifice allowed him and many of the stadium's other residents to escape, but most of them died in an ambush a week later with the remainder, including Douglas and Vivian, becoming a gang of bandits that rob and kill other survivors, leaving their victims to reanimate. As Cole's group prepares to execute Alicia, Teddy and Dakota, their reanimated victims attack, killing Douglas, Vivian and the other survivors. Unable to talk Cole down, Alicia kills him in self-defense, enraged and devastated that Cole had squandered her mother's sacrifice for him; Teddy reveals that the true purpose of the trip was to show Alicia how useless her mother's sacrifice was in the end. Teddy finally reveals that the keys go to a submarine that had washed up in Galveston, Texas and that they will allow him to use the sub's nuclear missiles to destroy what is left of the world. Alicia manages to broadcast a warning to Strand and is taken to the cult's hidden bunker beneath an old resort hotel where Teddy locks her in and explains that he believes that Alicia is the perfect person to lead the survivors when it is safe to emerge again.
84	15	"USS Pennsylvania"	Heather Cappiello	Nazrin Choudhury & Nick Bernardone	June 6, 2021	0.87
Teddy, Riley and Dakota prepare to launch the USS Pennsylvania's complement of nuclear missiles, revealing that Riley was once the subs Weapons' Officer. Having been warned by Alicia, Morgan's group races to the Pennsylvania, finding the sub occupied by its reanimated crew while Luciana leads a smaller group to a Naval base in search of information to help them. Morgan, Strand, John, Grace, June, Dwight and Sherry fight their way through the sub, finding signs of an unknown catastrophe having befallen the crew, including one compartment with radiation levels indicating exposed radioactive material within despite the rest of the sub's radiation levels being safe. Leaving the others behind, Morgan and Strand press on, but after getting cornered by walkers, Strand breaks Morgan's axe, stealing the head and leaves Morgan to fend off the walkers alone while he continues on. Strand is nearly killed by Dakota, but is saved at the last moment by Morgan who knocks Dakota unconscious. Using key cards recovered from the zombies, Morgan and Strand manage to enter the control room, but not before Teddy and Riley are able to launch one nuclear missile. The two reveal that the missile contains ten warheads all targeted on locations in Texas and can't be stopped. Morgan allows Teddy and Riley to leave and angrily blames Strand for their failure to stop the cult before sending him away as well.
85	16	"The Beginning"	Michael E. Satrazemis	Ian Goldberg & Andrew Chambliss	June 13, 2021	1.05
Searching for shelter, Dwight and Sherry find the home of a family terrorized by two cultists; Dwight and Sherry kill the men and join the family in their storm shelter, deciding not to let the bad guys win anymore at any cost. Rachel is badly injured while changing a tire and, unable to reach safety in time, ties herself to Morgan's dog Rufus and commits suicide so that Rufus can lead her as a walker and baby Morgan to other people. On the sub, Grace and Morgan admit their love for each other and prepare to commit suicide rather than live in the devastated world that will be left when Rachel arrives with her baby; Morgan puts their friend down and the two take custody of the baby, hiding under a nearby vehicle from a nuclear shockwave. Teddy and Dakota prepare to meet their end on an overlook, only to be confronted by John and June who forgive Dakota for her crimes. John discovers that Teddy has a hidden bunker that he intends to ride out the destruction in and emerge later to finish launching the Pennsylvania's nukes. John and June disarm the two and enter the bunker while Dakota, enraged that Teddy was only using her, kills the insane cult leader before allowing herself to be incinerated in a nuclear explosion. Strand takes cover in a building where he meets Howard, a historian; after surviving one of the blasts, Strand embraces the chance for a new beginning. Daniel, Wes, Luciana, Charlie, Jacob, Sarah and Rollie capture Riley who agrees to lead them to the cult's hidden bunker. However, Daniel realizes that Rollie is actually the cult's spy and kills him before Charlie shoots Riley who is left to reanimate when he dies. Following coordinates that Daniel had received over the radio, the group is rescued by a CRM helicopter sent by Al while nuclear explosions rock the area.

== Production ==
On July 19, 2019, AMC renewed the series for a sixth season.

=== Casting ===
In December 2019, it was announced that Zoe Colletti would join the main cast for the sixth season as Dakota, and that Mo Collins and Colby Hollman were promoted to series regulars after having recurring roles since the fourth and fifth seasons, respectively. In January 2020, it was confirmed that Christine Evangelista would reprise her role as Sherry, who last appeared in the seventh season of The Walking Dead; she is the third character to crossover from the parent series to Fear the Walking Dead.

=== Filming and writing ===
Production began in November 2019 in Texas. In March 2020, production for the sixth season was shut down due to the COVID-19 pandemic. Prior to the shutdown, the series had almost completed production on the first half of the season and showrunner Andrew Chambliss confirmed that every script for the sixth season was completed. Production was reported to have restarted in late August 2020 and was completed in March 2021.

Showrunner Ian Goldberg stated that the sixth season would take on an "anthology format", where episodes will focus on individual or pairs of characters, similar to previous episodes like season 4's "Laura". Goldberg also described it as "a darker season".

Cast member Lennie James made his directorial debut this season, and was mentored by fellow cast member Colman Domingo who had previously directed episodes for the series; Domingo also directed his third episode of the series in this season.

== Reception ==
=== Critical response ===
The sixth season received generally positive reviews, in contrast to generally mixed-to-negative reviews for the previous two seasons. On Rotten Tomatoes, the season has a rating of 89% based on 9 reviews, with an average rating of 7.30/10.

After a mixed-to-negative reception to the fourth and fifth seasons, the series received a renewed positive critical reception during its sixth season, but also received some mixed reviews as the season progressed. Early episodes of the sixth season were praised; Dalton Ross of Entertainment Weekly wrote that the series "is having its best season ever" and was positive about the series' take on different genres, writing "The end result is a bolder, more badass collection of stories that manages to feel narratively cohesive while, at the same time, visually and tonally independent." Paul Tassi of Forbes was positive towards the season and also noted the positive reactions from fans as well. Emily Hannemann of TV Insider also noted the series' improvement over previous seasons and praised the character development, plot and dialogue.

Erik Kain of Forbes at first gave the sixth season positive reviews, but shifted to very negative, stating "the story manages to be so godawful episode after episode."

=== Ratings ===
Viewership and ratings per episode of Fear the Walking Dead season 6
No.	Title	Air date	Rating (18–49)	Viewers (millions)	DVR (18–49)	DVR viewers (millions)	Total (18–49)	Total viewers (millions)
1	"The End Is the Beginning"	October 11, 2020	0.4	1.59	—N/a	—N/a	—N/a	—N/a
2	"Welcome to the Club"	October 18, 2020	0.4	1.55	—N/a	—N/a	—N/a	—N/a
3	"Alaska"	October 25, 2020	0.4	1.50	—N/a	—N/a	—N/a	—N/a
4	"The Key"	November 1, 2020	0.3	1.28	0.3	0.91	0.6	2.19
5	"Honey"	November 8, 2020	0.4	1.24	—N/a	—N/a	—N/a	—N/a
6	"Bury Her Next to Jasper's Leg"	November 15, 2020	0.3	1.27	—N/a	—N/a	—N/a	—N/a
7	"Damage from the Inside"	November 22, 2020	0.3	1.09	—N/a	—N/a	—N/a	—N/a
8	"The Door"	April 11, 2021	0.3	1.17	0.2	0.69	0.5	1.86
9	"Things Left to Do"	April 18, 2021	0.2	1.12	0.2	0.78	0.5	1.90
10	"Handle with Care"	April 25, 2021	0.3	1.10	0.2	0.71	0.4	1.82
11	"The Holding"	May 2, 2021	0.3	1.03	0.3	0.71	0.5	1.74
12	"In Dreams"	May 9, 2021	0.3	0.99	0.2	0.64	0.4	1.63
13	"J.D."	May 16, 2021	0.3	1.09	0.2	0.70	0.5	1.79
14	"Mother"	May 23, 2021	0.2	0.94	—N/a	—N/a	—N/a	—N/a
15	"USS Pennsylvania"	June 6, 2021	0.2	0.87	0.2	0.73	0.4	1.60
16	"The Beginning"	June 13, 2021	0.2	1.05	0.2	0.71	0.4	1.76
