= Alaska (Fear the Walking Dead) =

- Fear the Walking Dead episode
- Episode no.: Season 6 Episode 3
- Directed by: Colman Domingo
- Written by: Mallory Westfall
- Original air date: October 25, 2020
- Running time: 42 minutes

Guest appearances
- Brigitte Kali Canales as Rachel; Devyn Tyler as Nora

Episode chronology
← Previous "Welcome to the Club"	Next → "The Key"
- Fear the Walking Dead (season 6)

"Alaska" is the third episode of the sixth season of the post-apocalyptic horror television series Fear the Walking Dead, which aired on AMC on October 25, 2020, in the United States.

This episode was directed by Colman Domingo who plays Victor Strand, marking his third episode as a director. This episode also marks the first Fear the Walking Dead appearance of Christine Evangelista as Sherry, who is credited as a series regular. Evangelista is the third actor from The Walking Dead to join the main cast of Fear the Walking Dead; she last appeared in the seventh season of the original series.

== Plot ==
Morgan brings supplies to Rachel and her baby. While they chat, he attaches the blade of Emile’s axe to his staff.

Elsewhere, Al and Dwight scout a funeral home at Virginia’s behest. To distract themselves, they collect identity cards from walkers they put down: both need one from Alaska to complete their collections. Al’s radio picks up and Isabelle is talking. Dwight overhears; he deducts it’s Al’s mysterious sweetheart. Al admits she is listening to Isabelle and Dwight encourages Al to go look for her.

As they head to a tower in Dallas where they suspect Isabelle will make her next stop, Dwight scores the sought for Alaskan ID on a walker that fell from the roof. They pass a spray-painted "THE END IS THE BEGINNING" message when they enter the tower. In the stairwell, they discover rats in cages before a woman named Nora stops them at gunpoint. Nora is from a group that lives in the tower and who appear to be infected by the bubonic plague. When Al and Dwight disclose they are headed for the roof, Nora caution them her friend was killed by whomever flies the helicopters. Dwight hesitates, but Al points out how morbid their lives have become, making a card-collecting game out of killing walkers. She says she’d choose only a moment with Isabelle over carrying on like this. Dwight relent and they set off.

As they climb, Dwight reveals he believes he will never find his wife Sherry. Moments later, Al discovers nodes on Dwight’s neck, indicating he has been infected with the plague. While Al and Dwight argue about what to do, Nora appears and offers help. They dispatch several walker together, but Nora stops at the sight of a walker she used to know. To comfort Nora, Al gives her the Alaskan ID, rightly guessing it belonged to her friend.

Al heads to the roof alone. She sets off a flare and radios the approaching helicopter that it is unsafe to land due to the plague. Isabelle recognizes Al's voice, she tells Al to check the supply crates before declaring the site “burned” over the radio and turning the helicopter around. Al finds a boxful of medicine that cure the plague in the supplies left behind.

Al and Dwight help evacuate the survivors, promising to find them somewhere safe to live. Al takes a last look at the caged rats and deducts that the people who spray-painted the message in the lobby planted them on purpose to spread the plague.

As they leave, Al turns on the radio to check in, but an unknown woman’s voice comes through. Dwight realises it is Sherry. They reunite outside the building and kiss.

== Reception ==
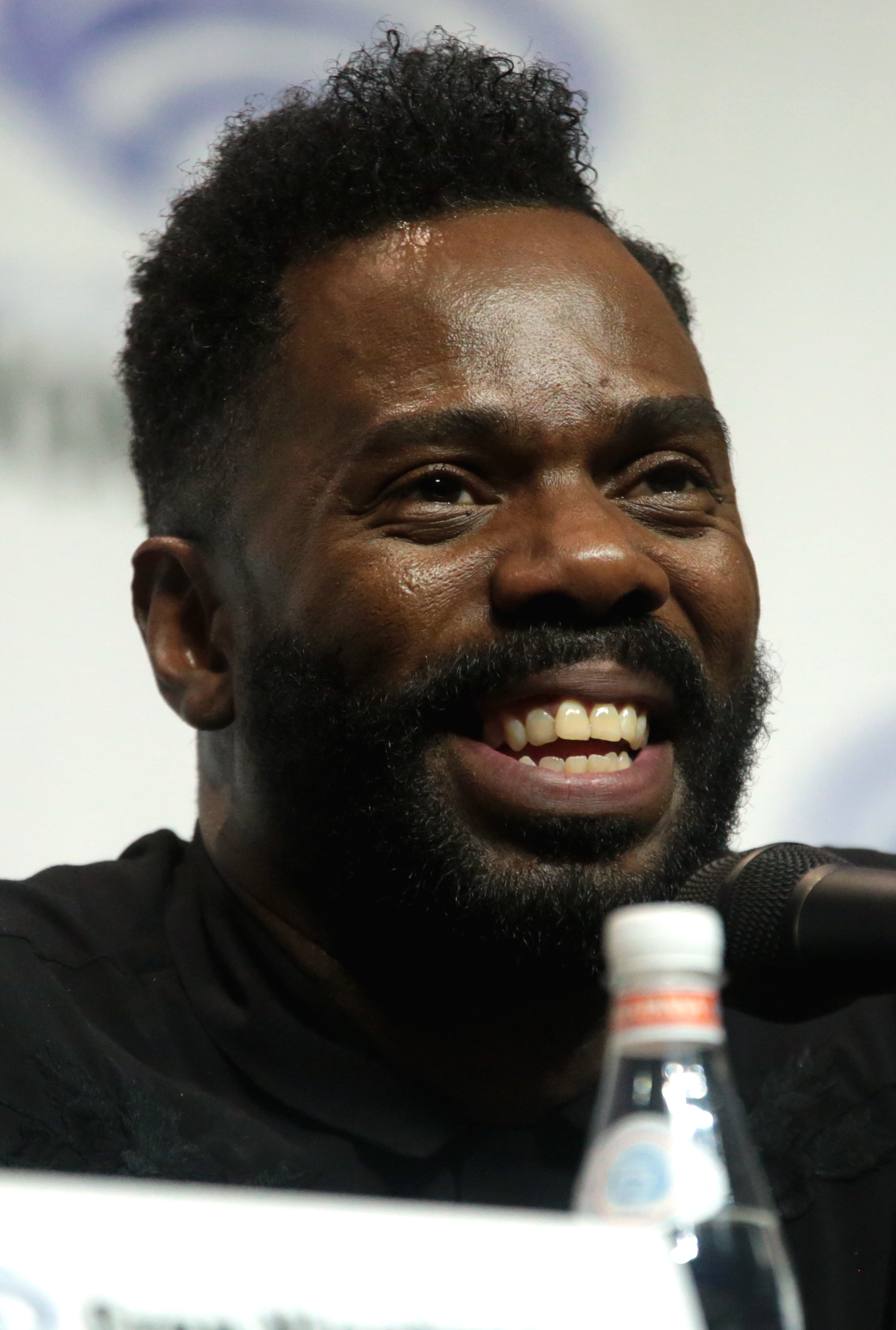
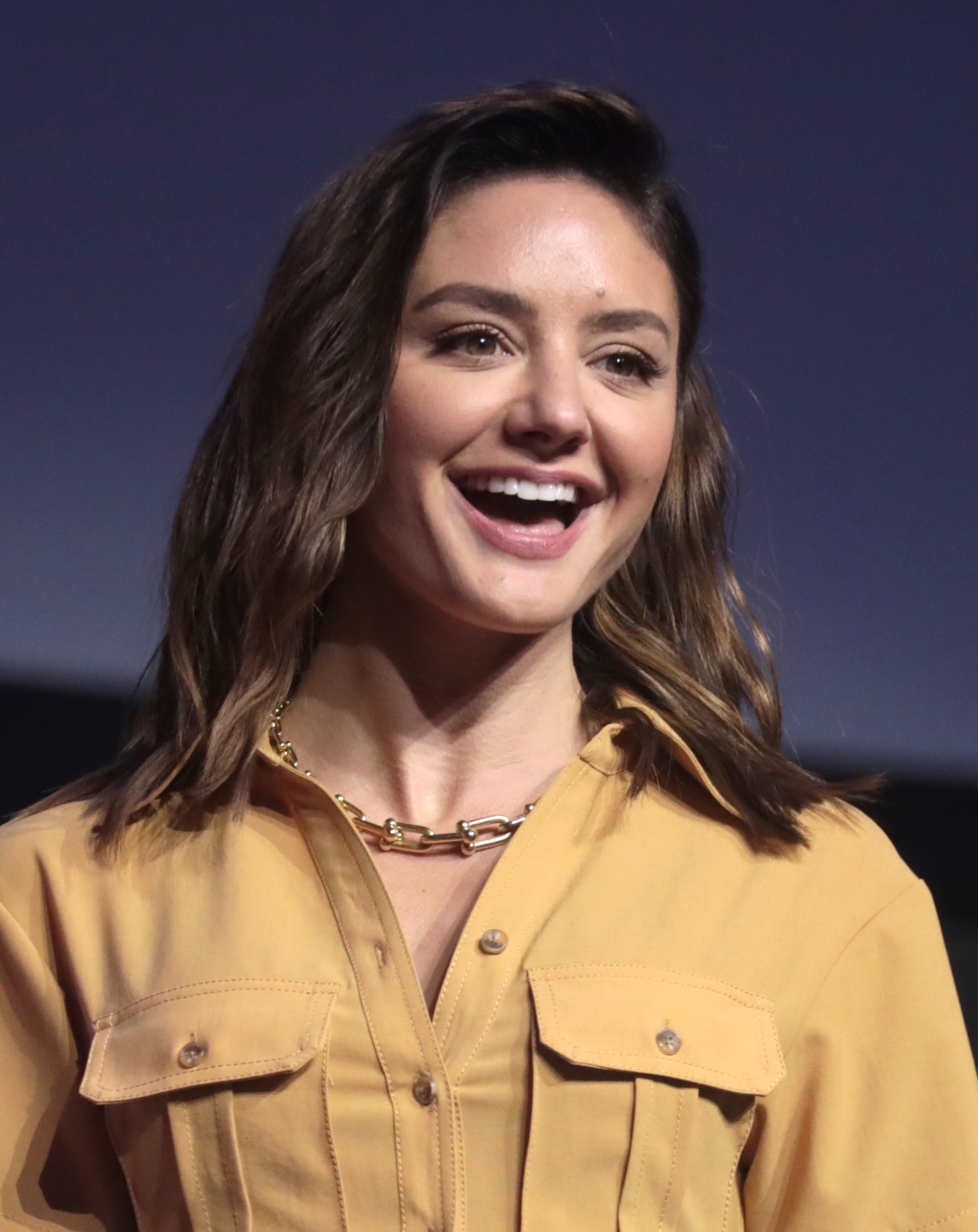
Domingo, who plays Victor Strand (left), directed his third episode for the series and Christine Evangelista (right) made her first appearance as Sherry in this episode, who is credited as a series regular.

=== Critical response ===
David S.E. Zapanta of Den of Geek! rated the episode 5 out 5 stars, writing, "we may only be three episodes in, but I’m really enjoying season 6 so far. Sure, maybe it’s the prolonged cabin fever talking—we are seven months into a pandemic, after all. Or maybe Fear the Walking Dead has finally hit its stride." Erik Kain of Forbes praised the episode and wrote: "Fear The Walking Dead continues to be better than it was last season and through most of Season 4, but its creators are having a hard time shedding some of their worst habits."

=== Ratings ===
The episode was seen by 1.50 million viewers in the United States on its original air date, below the previous episodes.
