= Damage from the Inside =

- Fear the Walking Dead episode
- Episode no.: Season 6 Episode 7
- Directed by: Tawnia McKiernan
- Written by: Jacob Pinion
- Original air date: November 22, 2020
- Running time: 48 minutes

Guest appearances
- Colby Minifie as Virginia; Raphael Sbarge as Ed; Craig Nigh as Hill

Episode chronology
← Previous "Bury Her Next to Jasper's Leg"	Next → "The Door"
- Fear the Walking Dead (season 6)

"Damage from the Inside" is the seventh episode and mid-season finale of the sixth season of the post-apocalyptic horror television series Fear the Walking Dead, which aired on AMC on November 22, 2020, in the United States.

== Plot ==
Dakota and Strand travel by car as a convoy of Rangers escorts them. They are ambushed by an unknown party, leaving Strand and a lone Ranger alive. Alicia and Charlie are on guard duty at an outpost. Strand enlists their help in finding Dakota, promising he has a plan to take Virginia down.

Dakota has fled to an old hunting lodge occupied by a taxidermist named Ed who uses his skill to make modifications on walkers. Alicia and Charlie arrive, and despite his bizarre habits, Ed proves to be friendly. Bonding with him, Dakota reveals she doesn’t want to go back because Virginia killed her parents. Motivated by her own plan to retake the stadium, Alicia secretly contacts Virginia to trade in Dakota for her and Charlie’s freedom. This angers Ed; he lures in walkers from the surrounding areas so the girls can’t leave. In the ensuing fight, Alicia accidentally impales Ed on antlers. Ed then sacrifices himself to the horde he summoned, begging Alicia to keep Dakota safe. Morgan appears and helps Alicia dispatch the walkers.

After burying Ed, Morgan reveals his plan to trade Dakota for the rest of their group. Alicia has changed her mind about Dakota and quarrels with him. She realizes then that Morgan is the one who attacked the convoy to take Dakota hostage. When Alicia threatens to leave, Morgan agrees to take Dakota along with them to his new settlement. Strand arrives at the lodge and plead with everyone not to destroy his belaboured effort to gain Virginia’s trust. Strand eventually stands down but refuses to follow Morgan, going back to the Pioneers instead.

Back to the camp, Strand convinces Virginia of his loyalty. Virginia takes Strand to a visibly pregnant Grace and puts him in charge of hunting down every single person from his group.

== Reception ==
Emily Hannemann of TV Insider rated the episode 4 out of 5 stars, writing: "While it was a little slow at times, “Damage From the Inside” did a great job of showing the "dark sides" of Alicia, Morgan, and Strand. That, in combination with the neat-looking walkers, makes it the second-best episode this half-season." Paul Dailly of said the episode "worked very well as a midseason finale."

David S.E. Zapanta from Den of Geek! rated it 1.5 out of 5 ratings and wrote: "The last time I struggled to write a review for Fear the Walking Dead was the season 4 finale. I wrote at the time, 'Several false starts and a couple thousand words later, I realized I wasn’t writing a review for a lackluster episode. Rather, I was writing a eulogy for a show I once loved.'"

=== Ratings ===
The episode was seen by 1.09 million viewers in the United States on its original air date, below the previous episodes.
