= The Door (Fear the Walking Dead) =

- Fear the Walking Dead episode
- Episode no.: Season 6 Episode 8
- Directed by: Michael E. Satrazemis
- Written by: Andrew Chambliss; Ian Goldberg
- Original air dates: April 4, 2021 (AMC+); April 11, 2021 (AMC)
- Running time: 50 minutes

Guest appearances
- Colby Minifie as Virginia; Craig Nigh as Hill

Episode chronology
← Previous "Damage from the Inside"	Next → "Things Left to Do"
- Fear the Walking Dead (season 6)

"The Door" is the eighth episode and mid-season premiere of the sixth season of the post-apocalyptic horror television series Fear the Walking Dead. The 77th episode overall, "The Door" was released on the streaming platform AMC+ on April 4, 2021, in the United States, and aired on television on AMC one week later, on April 11, 2021. The episode was directed by Michael Satrazemis and written by Andrew Chambliss and Ian Goldberg.

A reunion with an old friend helps pull John Dorie (Garret Dillahunt) out of his darkest moment yet. Back at Lawton, Virginia (Colby Minifie) demands answers.

== Plot ==
Alone at his cabin, John (Garret Dillahunt) prepares to commit suicide, but he is interrupted by walkers washing ashore. While investigating the perimeter, John finds Morgan (Lennie James) and Dakota (Zoe Colletti), who are hiding from Virginia's rangers. A walker horde blocks the only bridge out of the area. John agrees to help them get through the horde, but refuses to join Morgan's new community despite Morgan's continued enticements.

Virginia (Colby Minifie) contacts Morgan, revealing that she is holding Grace (Karen David), Daniel (Ruben Blades), Sarah (Mo Collins), June (Jenna Elfman), and Wes (Colby Hollman) hostage to ensure Dakota's safety. Ranger Marcus (Justin Smith) finds the cabin and captures Morgan. To save Morgan, John kills Ranger Marcus. After modifying an old truck, the three of them (John, Morgan, and Dakota) drive their way through the horde, but before John can go back, Morgan arranges a meeting with Virginia at John's cabin to force John out of his isolation. While Morgan absents himself, John discovers that Dakota's knife has the same handle as the one involved in Cameron's death. Dakota confesses to the murder and shoots John in order to protect her secret. Morgan sees the knife when he returns and realizes the truth. At gunpoint, Dakota orders Morgan to take her to his settlement as planned. She reveals she was the one who saved him at Humbug's Gulch after Virginia shot him, and explains the only reason she saved him was because she wanted him to kill Virginia.

Meanwhile, Dwight (Austin Amelio) brings Alicia (Alycia Debnam-Carey) and Charlie (Alexa Nisenson) to the new settlement. Morgan radios Dwight and Althea (Maggie Grace) to tell them to prepare for an impending battle against the Pioneers. Alerted by Morgan, June finds John stranded outside his cabin, but he has already died and reanimated. A devastated June puts him down.

== Production ==
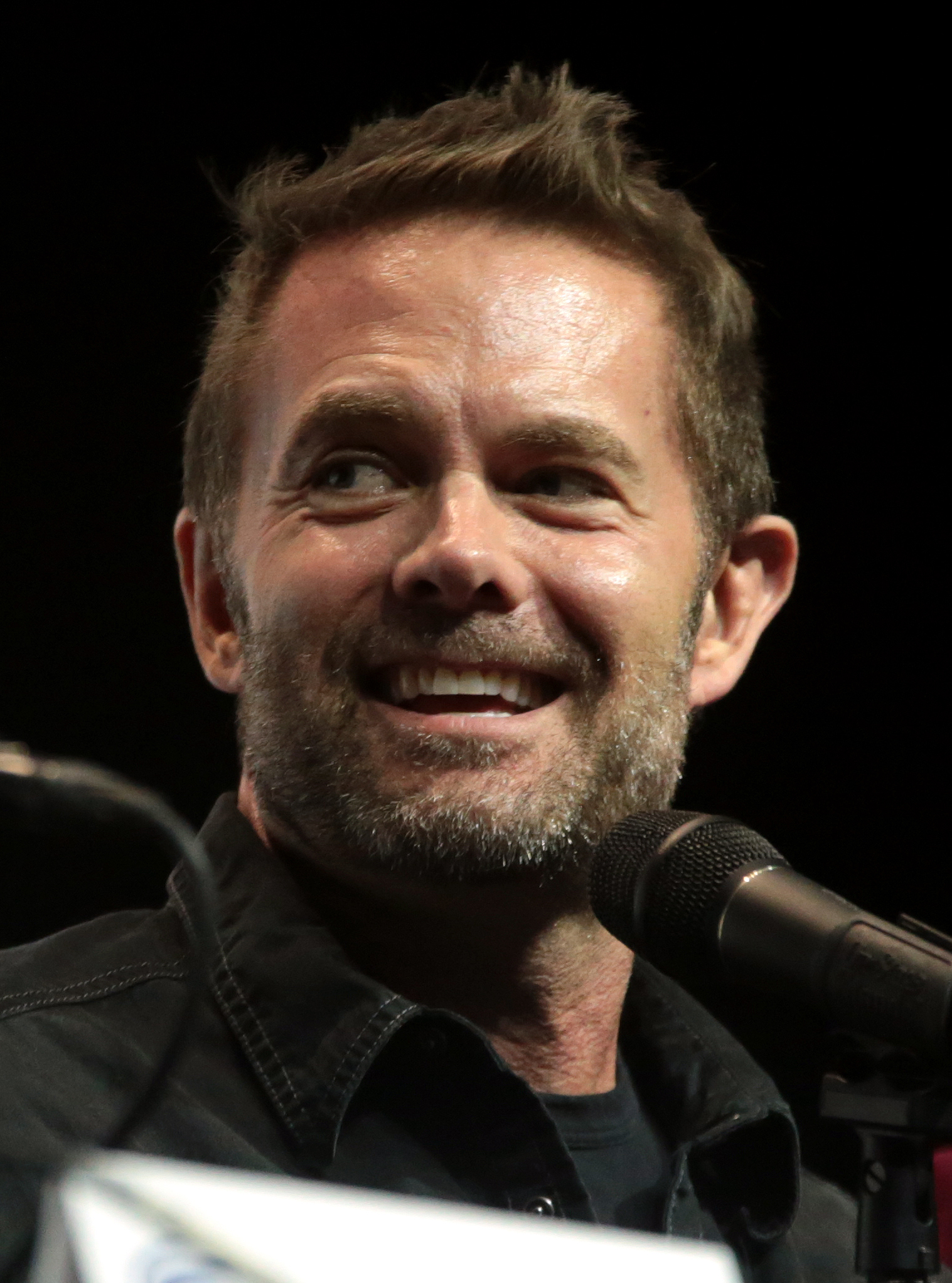
"The Door" marked the death of John Dorie (played by Garret Dillahunt).

"The Door" features the death of John Dorie (Garret Dillahunt) at the hands of Dakota (Zoe Colletti). John Dorie first appeared as a main character in the fourth season premiere episode, "What's Your Story?".

In an interview with Dalton Ross of Entertainment Weekly, Garret Dillahunt revealed his departure from the character and explained:

"I don't remember exactly when, but it's something we'd been talking about since season 5. And then we had a lot of conversations between 5 and 6 about how John would exit. And they came up with this great idea — great, and tragic, and wonderful, and believable in this world for how to get him off the show. And, at the same time, propel the story forward."

== Reception ==
=== Critical reception ===
David S.E. Zapanta from Den of Geek! praised the episode, saying it is "careful to balance out the human drama with moments of intense zombie action. The bridge-clearing scene in particular is especially gruesome and violent." Emily Hannemann of TV Insider considered it "a fantastic, heartbreaking episode that harkens back to the days where characters died randomly and shockingly." Paul Dailly of TV Fanatic gave it a score of 4 out of 5 stars, writing, "[the episode] featured high stakes and many payoffs, even if we did lose one of the best characters on the show."

In his review, Erik Kain of Forbes was upset by John's death, writing: "The death of John Dorie was a long time coming. I get the feeling that Dillahunt was not entirely happy with Fear and might have wanted to take his talents elsewhere. It’s a shame nonetheless." Ray Flook of Bleeding Cool gave a positive review, and praised the acting by Dillahunt and Colletti, writing: "Dillahunt portrays that conflict amazingly, conveying both the nobility and doubt behind the decisions he makes with only a few words. [...] As for Colletti, this is a game-changing episode for the actor personally and professionally [...] In less than an hour, Dakota just became one of the more fascinating 'big bads' Fear TWD has seen in some time with so many possibilities storyline-wise."

=== Ratings ===
The episode was seen by 1.17 million viewers in the United States on its original air date, above the previous episode.
