= In Dreams (Fear the Walking Dead) =

- Fear the Walking Dead episode
- Episode no.: Season 6 Episode 12
- Directed by: Michael E. Satrazemis
- Written by: Andrew Chambliss; Ian Goldberg; Nazrin Choudhury
- Original air dates: May 7, 2021 (AMC+); May 9, 2021 (AMC)
- Running time: 50 minutes

Guest appearances
- Nick Stahl as Jason Riley; Sahana Srinivasan as Athena Mukherjee

Episode chronology
← Previous "The Holding"	Next → "J.D."
- Fear the Walking Dead (season 6)

"In Dreams" is the twelfth episode of the sixth season of the post-apocalyptic horror television series Fear the Walking Dead, the 81st episode overall, "In Dreams" was released on the streaming platform AMC+ on May 7, 2021, in the United States and aired on television on AMC two days later, on May 9, 2021.

Grace wakes up in what appears to be a dream-like state with a case of amnesia. Seeing what's become of her friends after she has been gone for years, Grace struggles to put the pieces of the past together on what has transpired since she has been gone.

== Plot ==
Grace finds herself in the future, sixteen years from now. She discovers she has died giving birth to her daughter Athena, but all her friends have prospered. Traveling with Athena, Grace notices glitches in the world surrounding her and realises she is dreaming. In the real world, Grace is knocked out from an explosion engineered by Riley and the Believers.

Her dream paralleling the real world, Grace makes her way through dreamland, bonding with her daughter as she evades Riley's forces. She starts believing the dream is prophetic: she must wake up to give birth to Athena, before dying herself.

In the real world, Morgan takes refuge with Grace in a stables. Morgan kills Riley's men, forcing Riley to retreat. As Grace's heart stops and Morgan tries to revive her, in the dream, Grace says goodbye to Athena and Morgan, and walks into the light. This resuscitates Grace in the real world.

Riley returns and demands at gunpoint the key Morgan took from Emile. Grace tells Morgan to give it up, convinced by her dream that it won't matter because her daughter will bridge a better future for everyone. Grace gives birth to Athena, but Grace and Morgan are devastated to find Athena stillborn. Grace realises she had been dreaming her daughter's dream the whole time.

== Reception ==
=== Critical reception ===
Paul Daily of TV Fanatic rated the episode 3.5 out of 5 and praised Grace's development and Karen David's performance, adding "I've always had this feeling the rug was going to be pulled out from under us to reveal that she's been working with this new group all along.". Emily Hannemann of TV Insider gave the episode 5 out of 5 stars, writing " 'In Dreams' is among the show’s best installments, anchored by strong performances and a tragic twist." Ray Flook of Bleeding Cool also praised the episode, saying "it was a very touching and heartbreaking tale of the sacrifices a mother is willing to make for her daughter- and in this case, vice-versa."

David S.E. Zapanta from Den of Geek! rated it of 2.5 out of 5 and wrote: "By the end of the season, I expect we’ll find out what “the cost of peace” really means for our survivors. Erik Kain of Forbes expressed a mixed view of the episode as well, writing, "Fear The Walking Dead takes a somewhat surreal approach to Sunday night’s episode, “In Dreams.” For better or worse. It also goes very dark, with a tragedy tailor-made for Mother's Day. Fun times".

=== Ratings ===
The episode was seen by 0.99 million viewers in the United States on its original air date, below the previous episodes, being one of the lowest audiences.
