= Bury Her Next to Jasper's Leg =

- Fear the Walking Dead episode
- Episode no.: Season 6 Episode 6
- Directed by: Sharat Raju
- Written by: Alex Delyle
- Original air date: November 15, 2020
- Running time: 41 minutes

Guest appearances
- Colby Minifie as Virginia; Daryl Mitchell as Wendell; Craig Nigh as Hill

Episode chronology
← Previous "Honey"	Next → "Damage from the Inside"
- Fear the Walking Dead (season 6)

"Bury Her Next to Jasper's Leg" is the sixth episode of the sixth season of the post-apocalyptic horror television series Fear the Walking Dead, which aired on AMC on November 15, 2020, in the United States.

== Plot ==
A woman named Paige runs through the woods. Virginia and her men catches and confront her. Paige has been assigned to lumber duty since a man named Jasper lost his leg, and the painted message “THE END IS THE BEGINNING” have been popping up on trees. Paige claims that what she does is “about the future” before shooting herself. Furious, Virginia orders her men to bury Paige “next to Jasper’s leg”.

June and Sarah are now running a mobile clinic, but aren't having much success in saving people: a man dies from a burst appendix on the operation table. John comes by to pick up June. Still haunted by Janis’ death, John tries to convince June to flee to his cabin together. He is interrupted by a distress call from Luciana about the explosion of a new well in Tank Town.

Virginia, John, June, Sarah, Luciana and other Pioneers fight to save survivors of the disaster. The same spray-painted message "THE END IS THE BEGINNING" convinces Virginia that it was not an accident. Upon finding the art supplies belonging to an injured Wes, Virginia tortures him for answers, believing he is responsible. June intervenes and saves Wes.

June and Virginia are trapped by an explosion, and Virginia is attacked by a walker who bite her hand. June hesitates to amputate Virginia’s hand, blaming Virginia for the deaths of the workers. Virginia insists that her methods are necessary to protect her community. June decides to save Virginia, who agrees to give June her own hospital. John rescues the both of them before Tank Town is destroyed.

As a consequence of her deal with Virginia, June refuses to leave with John. She intends on building her hospital with the help of Luciana, Sarah, Wes, and Wendell. A disheartened John decides to escape on his own.

== Reception ==
"Bury Her Next To Jasper's Leg" received mixed reviews. David S.E. Zapanta from Den of Geek! gave it a negative rating of 2 out of 5 ratings and wrote: "What is there to say really about this week's Fear the Walking Dead? After a strong run of episodes that stumbled with last week’s 'Honey', season 6 completely face plants with 'Bury Her Next to Jasper’s Leg.' If I were John Dorie, I’d cut and run back to a lakeside cabin, too. But it didn't have to be this way." Emily Hannemann from TV Insider gave it a rating of 2.5 out of 5 ratings, and also gave the episode a negative review in the process, writing: "This episode was suspenseful and had some great character moments for June, but it’s hard to move past all the ways it goes against the rules of the universe in which these shows take place. That, combined with John’s weird decision, makes this the lowest-rated episode of the season for me." Paul Daily writing for TV Fanatic gave it a rating of 4.75 out of 5 ratings, and wrote: "Fear the Walking Dead Season 6 Episode 6 was a pulse-pounding installment that featured several misdirects, tense zombie battles, and a lot of payoff to some big storylines."

=== Ratings ===
The episode was seen by 1.27 million viewers in the United States on its original air date, above the previous episodes.
