= Christine Evangelista =

American actress

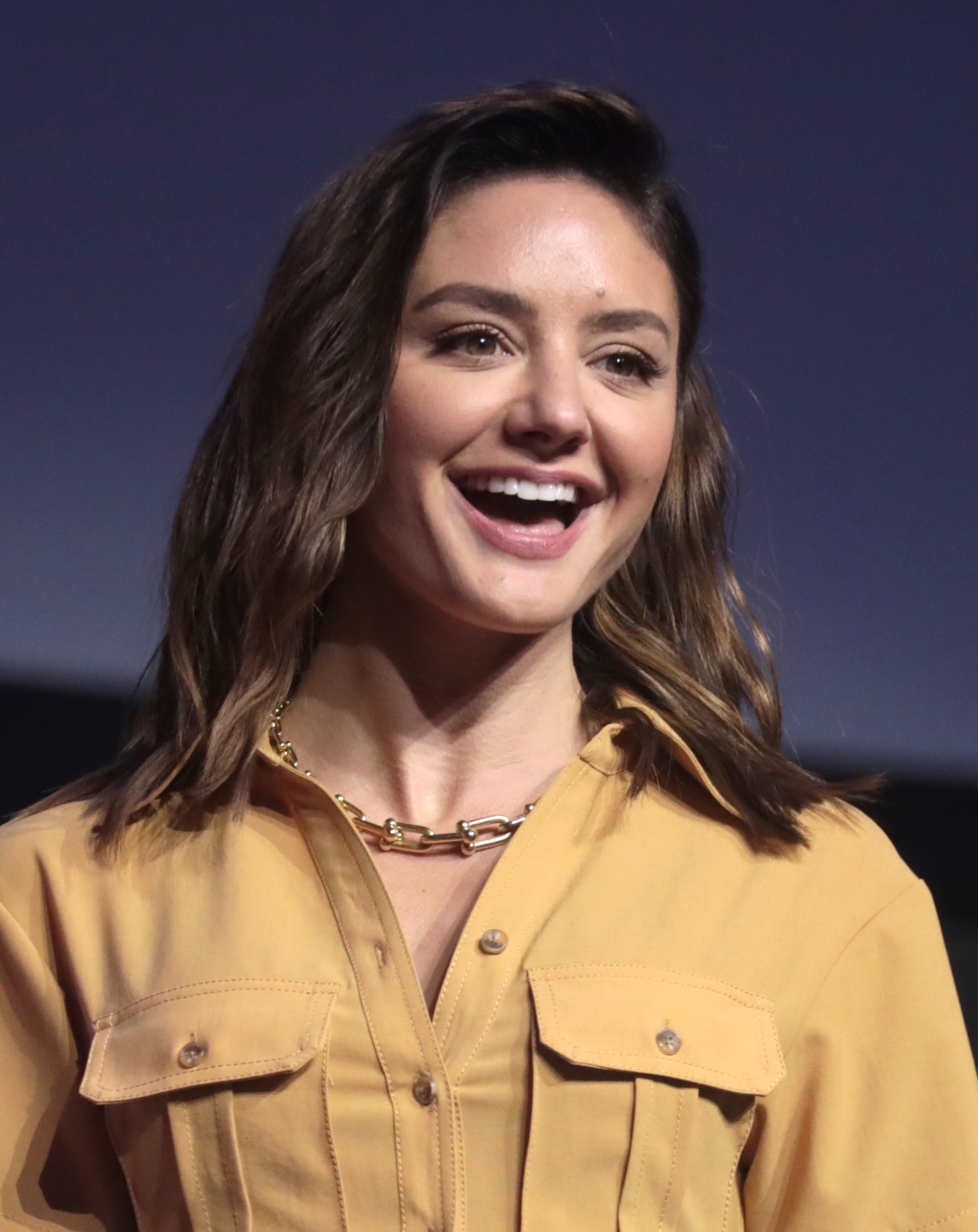
- Evangelista at the 2023 WonderCon
- Born: October 27, 1986 (age 40); Staten Island, New York, U.S.
- Occupation: Actress
- Years active: 2005–present
- Family: Linda Evangelista (cousin)

Christine Evangelista (born October 27, 1986) is an American actress. She is best known for her supporting role as Sherry in the AMC zombie apocalypse horror television series The Walking Dead, along with her later reprising her role in the spin-off series Fear the Walking Dead and her main role as Megan Morrison West in the E! drama television series The Arrangement.

== Early life and education ==
Evangelista was born in New York City and graduated from the Herbert Berghof School of Acting, after attending the Michael J. Petrides School in Staten Island. Christine Evangelista is a first cousin of supermodel Linda Evangelista.

== Career ==
In New York, Evangelista performed in several off-Broadway shows and made appearances in episodes of TV shows such as Law & Order, White Collar, Royal Pains, The Good Wife, Blue Bloods, and 666 Park Avenue.

She moved to a regular role in the single season of the Spike TV series The Kill Point in 2007. In 2013, Evangelista starred as a series regular in the short-lived ABC drama series, Lucky 7, followed with a recurring role as Allison Rafferty in the NBC series Chicago Fire. From 2015 to 2017, she portrayed Sherry on the AMC series The Walking Dead. As of 2017, while still appearing on The Walking Dead, Evangelista had a lead role in the E! television series The Arrangement (2017–2018). In The Arrangement, she portrayed Megan Morrison West, an actress who, after a successful audition, is plucked from obscurity and offered a secret contract to be the fiancée to Kyle West, one of Hollywood's biggest stars.

Evangelista has appeared in a number of films. She had the leading role in the independent film Red Butterfly (2014), and later had supporting parts in films The Intern (2015) and Bleed for This (2016).

== Filmography ==
=== Film ===
Year	Title	Role	Notes
2007	Goodbye Baby	Melissa Brooks	
2008	Awilda and a Bee	Winner white girl	Short film
2009	This Is Madness	Receptionist	Short film
2009	Arranged: The Musical	Christine	Short film
2009	The Good Guy	Brooke	
2009	The Joneses	Naomi Madsen	
2010	Harvest	Tina	
2011	Escapee	Abby Jones	
2011	Underground	Jenna Hughes	
2012	Alter Egos	Emily	
2013	All Hallows' Eve	Scarecrow	
2014	Red Butterfly	Cleo McKenna	
2015	The Intern	ATF Creative Team	
2016	Bleed for This	Ashley	
2016	Long Nights Short Mornings	Natalie	

=== Television ===
Year	Title	Role	Notes
2005	Law & Order	Lindsay Doyle	Episode: "House of Cards"
2006	Conviction	Alyssa Burnside	Episode: "The Wall"
2007	The Kill Point	Ashley Beck	Main role, 8 episodes
2008	Canterbury's Law	Kathy Delgato	Episode: "Sweet Sixteen"
2009	Law & Order	Adrian Hemmings	Episode: "All New"
2010	White Collar	Veronica Naylon	Episode: "Copycat Caffrey"
2010	Royal Pains	Michelle	Episode: "The Hankover"
2010	The Good Wife	Madeleine	Episode: "Double Jeopardy"
2011	Blue Bloods	Jolene	Episode: "Little Fish"
2012	Dumb Girls	Michelle	Unsold television pilot
2012–2013	666 Park Avenue	Libby Griffith	2 episodes
2013	Lucky 7	Mary Lavecchia	Main role, 6 episodes
2014	Chicago Fire	Allison Rafferty	Recurring role, 5 episodes
2015	The Adversaries	Emma Fisher	Unsold television pilot
2015–2017	The Walking Dead	Sherry	Recurring role (seasons 6–7), 4 episodes
2017–2018	The Arrangement	Megan Morrison West	Main role, 20 episodes
2018	Erase	Noreen Rodriguez	Television film
2019	Mrs. Fletcher	Bethany / Ted's wife	Episodes: "Empty Nest", "Parents' Weekend"
2019–2023	Fear the Walking Dead	Sherry	Uncredited voice role (season 5), main role (seasons 6-8), 26 episodes

=== Video games ===
Year	Title	Role	Notes
2012	Alan Wake's American Nightmare	Emma Sloan	Voiceover role
