= Is Anybody Out There? =

Is Anybody Out There? may refer to:

- Is Anybody Out There? (song), a song by K'naan featuring Nelly Furtado
- Is Anybody Out There? (Fear the Walking Dead), an episode of the television series Fear the Walking Dead

== See also ==
- Is There Anybody Out There (disambiguation)
