= Skidmark (Fear the Walking Dead) =

- Fear the Walking Dead episode
- Episode no.: Season 5 Episode 4
- Directed by: Tara Nicole Weyr
- Written by: Samir Mehta
- Original air date: June 23, 2019
- Running time: 45 minutes

Guest appearances
- Daryl Mitchell as Wendell Rabinowitz; Mo Collins as Sarah Rabinowitz; Cooper Dodson as Dylan; Bailey Gavulic as Annie; Ethan Suess as Max

Episode chronology
← Previous "Humbug's Gulch"	Next → "The End of Everything"
- Fear the Walking Dead (season 5)

"Skidmark" is the fourth episode of the fifth season of the post-apocalyptic horror television series Fear the Walking Dead, which aired on AMC on June 23, 2019. The episode was written by Samir Mehta and directed by Tara Nicole Weyr.

== Plot ==
Strand, Charlie, Sarah, and Wendell try to steal Daniel's plane, but he anticipates their move and disables it. After accidentally meeting up with Daniel, Charlie discovers that he is disarming deadly traps set by Logan. Daniel's cat, Skidmark, accidentally lets go of a pack while in one of those traps and Daniel sends Charlie forward as he lures the pack back. Daniel reveals that he is angry at Strand not for being shot in the face, but because Strand lying to him about Ofelia, preventing Daniel from seeing his daughter alive again. Strand and the others rush to Daniel's rescue and Strand uses the plane to eliminate the pack, damaging the engines beyond repair.

Daniel forgives Strand and gives the group use of his warehouse as he continues his mission. At the same time, Morgan and Alicia search for Althea and discover in the process that Max, Annie and Dylan are part of a larger group of children, the children of people who died of radiation sickness in a nearby camp. The children take them to the camp of the people who took Althea, only to witness the people fly away by helicopter. Meanwhile, Dylan and Luciana fix the truck stop's long-range antenna and contact Strand, who informs them of the plane's fate. Dylan suggests that the group repair their crashed plane to escape.

== Reception ==
"Skidmark" received positive reviews. It currently holds a 75% positive rating with an average score of 7.12/10 out of 12 on the review aggregator Rotten Tomatoes. The critics' consensus reads: "'Skidmark' brings some spunk with a resourceful cat and a gooey set piece that ranks among the best zombie dispatches, although some viewers may find the season's increasingly hopeful tone to be more of a drag than a boon."

Writing for Tell-Tale TV, Nick Hogan gave it a rating of 4.5/5 and said: "Strikes a perfect balance that allows characters to shine and plot to move forward. Nothing feels overstuffed." David S.E. Zapanta of Den of Geek! gave it a rating of 2.5/5 and said: "What works best in "Skidmark" isn't the way Strand uses a two-engine plane's propellers to puree a few dozen walkers. No, the episode's high point is much simpler, and quieter, than all of that". Writing for Forbes, Erik Kain gave it a negative review and wrote: "Lost is the grittiness and tension of the original show. In its place, rosy optimism abounds. Season 5's saccharine storytellings undermines the entire reason we watch zombie shows."

=== Rating ===
The episode was seen by 1.66 million viewers in the United States on its original air date, far below the previous episodes.
