= You're Still Here =

You're Still Here may refer to:

- You're Still Here (song), a 2003 song by Faith Hill
- You're Still Here (Fear the Walking Dead), an episode of the television series Fear the Walking Dead
