= The End of Everything (Fear the Walking Dead) =

- Fear the Walking Dead episode
- Episode no.: Season 5 Episode 5
- Directed by: Michael E. Satrazemis
- Written by: Andrew Chambliss; Ian Goldberg
- Original air date: June 30, 2019
- Running time: 46 minutes

Guest appearances
- Sydney Lemmon as Isabelle; Bailey Gavulic as Annie; Ethan Suess as Max

Episode chronology
← Previous "Skidmark"	Next → "The Little Prince"
- Fear the Walking Dead (season 5)

"The End of Everything" is the fifth episode of the fifth season of the post-apocalyptic horror television series Fear the Walking Dead, which aired on AMC on June 30, 2019. The episode was written by Andrew Chambliss and Ian Goldberg and directed by Michael E. Satrazemis.

== Plot ==
After being kidnapped, Althea meets a young woman named Isabelle who works for the mysterious helicopter group. Althea hides her tape showing the zombified member of the group, Beckett, so Isabelle is forced to cooperate with Althea, who seeks information about the secret group and its activities.

With Isabelle's helicopter out of fuel and only three days before another team is dispatched to the area, Althea helps Isabelle make a treacherous climb to obtain the necessary supplies while revealing her own guilt for her brother's death. Isabelle reveals that her group is focusing on the future and rebuilding itself to the point where its mission is more important than anything or anyone.

After Beckett went insane after witnessing the effects of radiation from melting the power plant, Isabelle was forced to kill him. Althea eventually brings Isabelle to the tape and destroys it, but Isabelle chooses not to kill her due to their mutual attraction. Isabelle leaves in the helicopter with the story tape of Althea's brother, lying to her people about meeting someone. Althea meets with Morgan's group, Alicia and Annie. She lies about her experience meeting Isabelle and about what she learned from that encounter, keeping her promise to Isabelle. Inspired by her experiences, Althea reveals her last name to her friends and finally reveals personal information about herself.

== Reception ==
"The End of Everything" received mixed reviews. It holds a 64% positive rating with an average score of 5.75/10 out of 11 on the review aggregator Rotten Tomatoes. The critics' consensus reads: "'The End of Everything' features intriguing interplay between Maggie Grace and newcomer Sydney Lemmon, but this installment is more of an advertisement for future adventures than its own proper chapter."

David S.E. Zapanta of Den of Geek! gave it a rating of 4.5/5 and said: "Fear doesn't play the romance card very often, but it's used here to great effect. It's easy to see how these two characters could fall for each other". Alexander Zalben of Decider praised the episode and wrote: "Another heartfelt, human hour with a surprise twist that also managed to reveal a lot more about the helicopter people -- the mysterious group that's appeared on both Fear the Walking Dead and The Walking Dead." Writing for Forbes, Erik Kain gave it a positive review and wrote: "This show can apparently manage episodes that focus on just two characters very well, but as soon as the larger cast enters the picture everything falls apart."

=== Rating ===
The episode was seen by 1.71 million viewers in the United States on its original air date, above the previous episodes.
