= The Little Prince (Fear the Walking Dead) =

- Fear the Walking Dead episode
- Episode no.: Season 5 Episode 6
- Directed by: Sharat Raju
- Written by: Mallory Westfall
- Original air date: July 7, 2019
- Running time: 43 minutes

Guest appearances
- Mo Collins as Sarah Rabinowitz; Cooper Dodson as Dylan; Bailey Gavulic as Annie; Ethan Suess as Max

Episode chronology
| ← Previous "The End of Everything" | Next → "Still Standing" |
- Fear the Walking Dead (season 5)

"The Little Prince" is the sixth episode of the fifth season of the post-apocalyptic horror television series Fear the Walking Dead, which aired on AMC on July 7, 2019. The episode was written by Mallory Westfall and directed by Sharat Raju.

== Plot ==
Morgan's group takes the remains of an aeroplane to the truck stop and to repair it with the help of the group. The children help in the repair but when Althea tests the plane the propellers are destroyed. Annie decides to leave with other children and explains the events that occurred towards the loss of her parents in the camp found by the group. Grace manages to contact Morgan to reveal that the second reactor at the power plant will soon melt. Grace and Morgan plan to use the generator at the truck stop to delay the collapse but Grace doesn't think it can be stopped completely and believes that anyone left in the area would die when the reactor melts.

Rather than risk Morgan's life, Grace leaves alone to gain time. Dwight and John continue searching for Sherry; John finds a note from Sherry asking Dwight to resign himself to looking for her but he keeps it a secret. After debating a solution, Strand and Charlie arrive to help with the propellers for Daniel's plane using Jim Brauer's old hot air balloon. The balloon collapses in a field within the radioactive zone. As Morgan rushes to aid them and Alicia searches for the children, Strand and Charlie are surrounded by a horde of walkers, some of whom are radioactive.

== Reception ==
"The Little Prince" received negative reviews. It currently holds a 42% positive rating with an average score of 4.75/10 out of 12 on the review aggregator Rotten Tomatoes. The critics' consensus reads: "'The Little Prince' is a low point for the latest Fear the Walking Dead season, beggaring belief with a balloon and plot full of hot air while insisting upon an optimism that rings false in a series defined by despair." Alexander Zalben of Decider praised the episode and wrote: "[The hot air balloon] is delightful. A few weeks back I wrote about how Fear is starting to own its new tone as the goofy, weird cousin to the more serious Walking Dead, and a choice like this underlines that." David S.E. Zapanta of Den of Geek! gave it a low rating of 1.5/5 and said: "This once-entertaining show is crashing and burning just six hours into its troubled fifth season." Writing for Father Son Holy Gore, C.H. Newell praised the episode and said: "Great episode! This season's been stellar. The radiation adds a whole other layer of fear."

=== Rating ===
The episode was seen by 1.49 million viewers in the United States on its original air date, above the previous episodes.
