= Here to Help =

- Fear the Walking Dead episode
- Episode no.: Season 5 Episode 1
- Directed by: Michael E. Satrazemis
- Written by: Andrew Chambliss; Ian Goldberg
- Original air date: June 2, 2019
- Running time: 44 minutes

Guest appearances
- Daryl Mitchell as Wendell Rabinowitz; Mo Collins as Sarah Rabinowitz; Matt Frewer as Logan; Bailey Gavulic as Annie; Ethan Suess as Max

Episode chronology
← Previous "... I Lose Myself"	Next → "The Hurt That Will Happen"
- Fear the Walking Dead (season 5)

"Here to Help" is the first episode of the fifth season of the post-apocalyptic horror television series Fear the Walking Dead, which aired on AMC on June 2, 2019 in the United States. The episode was written by Andrew Chambliss and Ian Goldberg, and directed by Michael E. Satrazemis.

This episode marks the return of Daniel Salazar (Rubén Blades) who had been absent from the series throughout season 4.

== Plot ==
Alicia, Dorie, June, Morgan and Luciana get into a plane crash while trying to help a man named Logan, leaving Luciana seriously injured. The group encounters a group of children as well as strange traps and signs warning of high radiation in the area. The children eventually run off while the group is shocked to learn that Logan is actually Polar Bear's former partner who lured them as far away as possible so that he could take over their denim factory base. Althea investigates a strange walker wearing body armor, only to be captured by more of the man's group. As the rest of the group plans to retake the factory, Strand investigates a man on one of Althea's tapes who has a plane they can use to rescue their friends. To Strand's shock, the man is Daniel Salazar who hasn't been seen since the destruction of the Gonzales Dam.

== Reception ==
"Here to Help" received very positive reviews from critics, despite later episodes in the season receiving mostly mixed or poor reviews. On Rotten Tomatoes, "Here to Help" garnered a 92% rating, with an average score of 8.25/10 based on 13 reviews. The sites critical consensus reads; "Fear's band of survivors discover that good intentions pave a road to hell in a rousing season premiere that further stakes out the series' unique identity while adding connective, bloody tissue to the broader Walking Dead mythos."

=== Ratings ===
The premiere episode was watched by 1.97 million viewers and received an 0.6 18–49 demo rating. This was down slightly in viewers and demo from the fourth season finale.
