= Still Standing (Fear the Walking Dead) =

- Fear the Walking Dead episode
- Episode no.: Season 5 Episode 7
- Directed by: Marta Cunningham
- Written by: Richard Naing
- Original air date: July 14, 2019
- Running time: 44 minutes

Guest appearances
- Cooper Dodson as Dylan; Bailey Gavulic as Annie; Ethan Suess as Max

Episode chronology
← Previous "The Little Prince"	Next → "Is Anybody Out There?"
- Fear the Walking Dead (season 5)

"Still Standing" is the seventh episode of the fifth season of the post-apocalyptic horror television series Fear the Walking Dead, which aired on AMC on July 14, 2019. The episode was written by Richard Naing and directed by Marta Cunningham.

== Plot ==
John and Dwight continue to look for Sherry until they run out of fuel. Running out of time before collapsing, John confesses the truth to Dwight. Although Dwight decides to continue in faith and in hopes of seeing Sherry again, Dwight returns to John and they both return to the group. Charlie and Strand protect themselves from the walking horde using the balloon until Morgan arrives and rescues them. Morgan helps Grace repair the generator, delaying the collapse. Morgan convinces Grace not to stop living and she joins the group. Althea takes June to the fuel depot Isabelle showed her, to retrieve more fuel for the plane and tells her a bit about her meeting with Isabelle. Alicia arrives at Annie's group's camp and struggles to convince them to leave. After a pack arrives, Annie agrees to join them in leaving the area. Alicia drives the pack away, but is exposed to radiation when the blood of a radioactive walker splashes on her face. Later, sirens sound at the power plant, signalling a nuclear collapse.

== Reception ==
"Still Standing" received negative reviews. It currently holds a 36% negative rating with an average score of 4.75/10 out of 14 on the review aggregator Rotten Tomatoes. The critics' consensus reads: "'Still Standing' packs in plenty of oozing zombie action, but Fear the Walking Dead miscalculates by foreshadowing a character exit that would devastate the series' dramatic core."

During her review, Noetta Harjo of Geek Girl Authority said: "The writing is on point, the action is exciting and the dialogue is meaningful. I just wish the writers could do that throughout the season." Writing for TV Fanatic, Paul Dailly gave the episode a low rating of 3/5 rating and said: "The show is in a horrible place right now, and there's seemingly no way out. It needs to pick a lane and stick with it while also getting rid of the characters that don't mesh well with the others."

Liam Mathews of TV Guide gave his review and wrote: "Getting a mouthful of blood might be a death sentence for the last remaining Clark. Hopefully it isn't. Fear the Walking Dead will not survive killing off the last character remaining from the pilot."

=== Rating ===
The episode was seen by 1.39 million viewers in the United States on its original air date, far below the previous episodes.
