= Humbug's Gulch =

- Fear the Walking Dead episode
- Episode no.: Season 5 Episode 3
- Directed by: Colman Domingo
- Written by: Ashley Cardiff
- Original air date: June 16, 2019
- Running time: 44 minutes

Guest appearances
- Cooper Dodson as Dylan; Bailey Gavulic as Annie; Ethan Suess as Max

Episode chronology
← Previous "The Hurt That Will Happen"	Next → "Skidmark"
- Fear the Walking Dead (season 5)

"Humbug's Gulch" is the third episode of the fifth season of the post-apocalyptic horror television series Fear the Walking Dead, which aired on AMC on June 19, 2019. The episode was written by Ashley Cardiff and directed by cast member Colman Domingo, marking the second episode he has directed for the series.

This episode marks the first appearance of Dwight portrayed by Austin Amelio, after his departure in season 8 from the original series. He is the second cast member from The Walking Dead after Lennie James to join the main cast of Fear the Walking Dead.

== Plot ==
The group begins to map out the location of the walkers' obstacles as Alicia begins searching for Max's family after hearing a message from them on the radio. John and June are attacked and take refuge in Humbug's Gulch, a ghost town that once acted as a theme park attraction. While retrieving weapons from the living room during a dust storm, Dwight attacks and finally reveals that he is looking for his missing wife, Sherry.

Dwight's search has taken him from Virginia to Texas, following notes from Sherry, who is on the run from "bad people." Dwight gets caught by a herd while searching in a car for the next clue, which turns out to be a dead end. June talks to Dwight about not committing suicide and the three of them take out the pack together. Using his experience as a cop, John determines that Dwight was looking at the wrong car and that Sherry may still be there.

Dwight and Morgan meet for the first time since the war with the Saviors and leave the past behind. Dwight leads the group to the biggest obstacle for the walkers yet, but they are interrupted by a call from Max. The group finds Dylan bloodied as Max and Annie set another obstacle for the walkers and plan to use Dylan to find out why Morgan's group is in the area before making sure they are not a threat to them.

== Reception ==
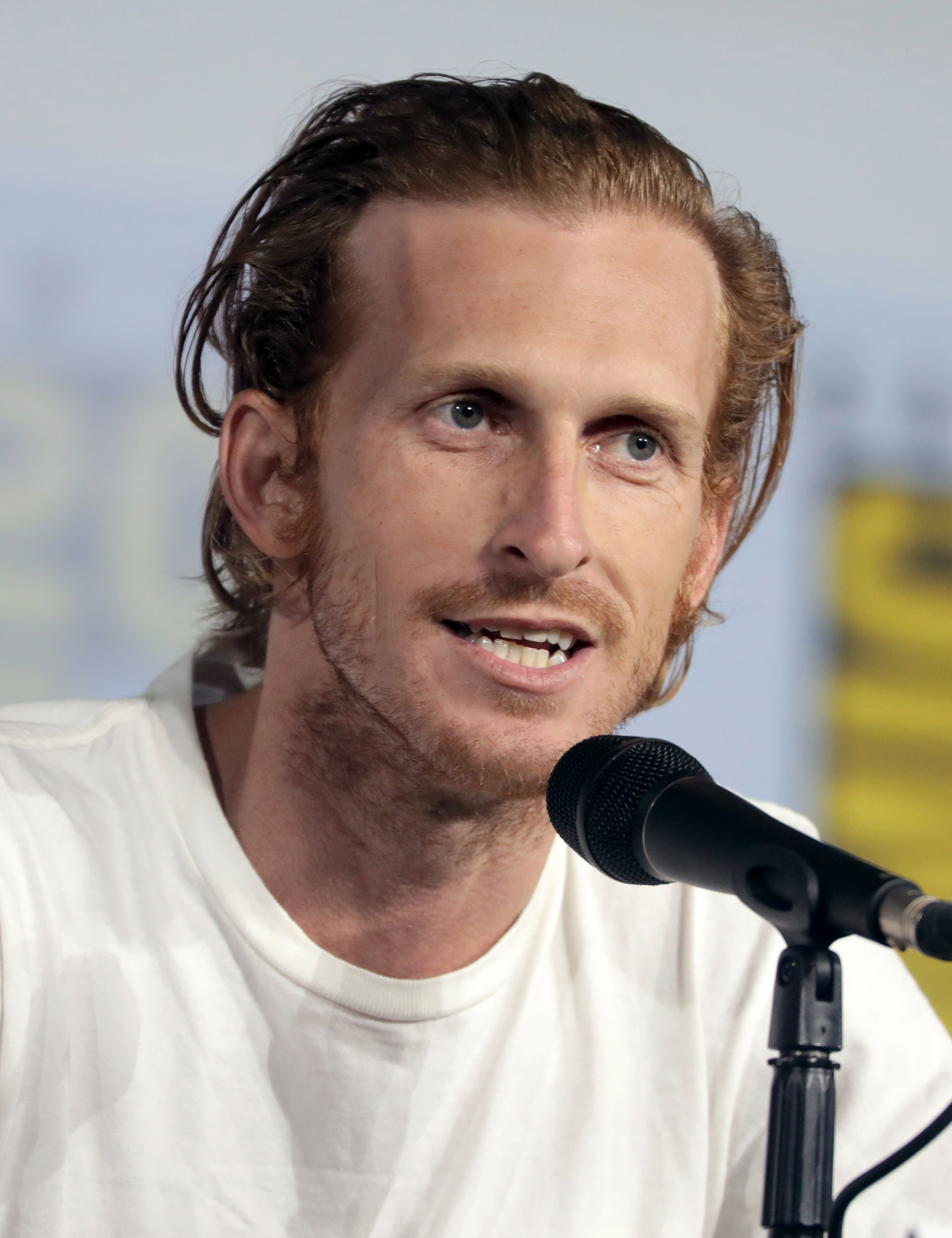
Austin Amelio made his first appearance as Dwight in this episode, after his departure from The Walking Dead.

The episode received mostly positive reviews, despite most episodes in the season receiving either mixed or poor reviews. It holds an 83% positive rating with an average score of 6.33/10 out of 12 on the review aggregator Rotten Tomatoes. The critics' consensus reads: "Fear the Walking Dead dusts off its spurs and has pulpy fun with Western tropes, although some viewers may feel that this installment's earnestness is unearned."

Writing for Forbes, Erik Kain praised the episode and wrote: "All told, minus a couple eye-rolling moments, this was a pretty good episode. I liked the Western movie feel of Humbug's Gulch, and enjoyed more focus on John Dorie and June". Writing for Tell-Tale TV, Nick Hogan gave it a rating of 4/5 and said: "Fear the Walking Dead is slowly balancing out its plot and character into a wholly satisfying show." Noetta Harjo of Geek Girl Authority praised the episode and wrote: "It's actually good to see Dwight again. He has a lot to atone for".

David S.E. Zapanta of Den of Geek! gave it a rating of 2.5/5 and said: "Gulch" isn't let down by Domingo's direction. Rather, it's Ashley Cardiff's script, which would have us believe in the power of positive thinking in one moment, only to show us the folly of following one's heart in the next moment. Writing for Uproxx, Dustin Rowles said: "That San Antonio split was hugely impressive. I think it may have given June the vapors. Six-Gun Sam is also a much better name that John Dorie".

=== Rating ===
The episode was seen by 1.76 million viewers in the United States on its original air date, above the previous episodes.
