= Today and Tomorrow (Fear the Walking Dead) =

- Fear the Walking Dead episode
- Episode no.: Season 5 Episode 14
- Directed by: Sydney Freeland
- Written by: Richard Naing; David Johnson
- Original air date: September 15, 2019
- Running time: 44 minutes

Guest appearances
- Colby Minifie as Virginia; Joe Massingill as Tom

Episode chronology
← Previous "Leave What You Don't"	Next → "Channel 5"
- Fear the Walking Dead (season 5)

"Today and Tomorrow" is the fourteenth episode of the fifth season of the post-apocalyptic horror television series Fear the Walking Dead, which aired on AMC on September 15, 2019. The episode was written by Richard Naing and David Johnson, and directed by Sydney Freeland.

== Plot ==
While on a supply run, Grace and Daniel run into trouble when their truck breaks down and they are chased by a horde of walkers. Sheltered in an abandoned bar, Daniel explains that it was Charlie who pulled him out of his apartment.

Working with Althea, Morgan delays the return to the convoy, finally admitting that it is due to his good and flowing relationship with Grace. The two rescue a man named Tom from some of the Virginia pioneers and Tom's story makes Althea wonder if the group is related to Isabelle. Morgan and Althea break into a condominium complex Tom had been living in to search for Tom's sister Janis, but find her missing and are captured by Virginia. She appears to know nothing about the helicopter group and frees them, urging them to join her cause.

Morgan opens up to Althea about his lost family as she reveals her experiences with Isabelle. Trying to reconcile with Grace, Morgan learns that she has fallen ill again and feels that she does not have much more time left to live.

== Reception ==
"Today and Tomorrow" received mixed reviews. It currently holds a 50% rating, with an average score of 5.25/10 out of 10 on the review aggregator Rotten Tomatoes. The critics' consensus reads: "'Today and Tomorrow' pauses to reflect on the Fear ensemble's emotional dynamics, a shift in pace that may please fans of these apocalyptic survivors while leaving others frustrated by the narrative standstill this late in the season."

Jeffrey Lyles of Lyles' Movie Files gave it a 6/10 rating and wrote: "'Today and Tomorrow' was OK even with Morgan and Al's awful infiltration skills, but the more enjoyable aspects of the episode was Grace and Daniel." However, Erik Kain of Forbes was negative about the episode and wrote: "A story that has rambled and wobbled since the start of Season 5 and still managed to get nowhere."

=== Rating ===
The episode was seen by 1.31 million viewers in the United States on its original air date, below the previous episodes.
