= Leave What You Don't =

- Fear the Walking Dead episode
- Episode no.: Season 5 Episode 13
- Directed by: Daisy von Scherler Mayer
- Written by: Ashley Cardiff; Nick Bernardone
- Original air date: September 8, 2019
- Running time: 44 minutes

Guest appearances
- Matt Frewer as Logan; Daryl Mitchell as Wendell; Mo Collins as Sarah Rabinowitz; Peter Jacobson as Jacob Kessner; Colby Hollman as Wes; Colby Minifie as Virginia; Holly Curran as Janis; Cooper Dodson as Dylan; Bailey Gavulic as Annie; Ethan Suess as Max

Episode chronology
← Previous "Ner Tamid"	Next → "Today and Tomorrow"
- Fear the Walking Dead (season 5)

"Leave What You Don't" is the thirteenth episode of the fifth season of the post-apocalyptic horror television series Fear the Walking Dead, which aired on AMC on September 8, 2019. The episode was written by Ashley Cardiff and Nick Bernardone, and directed by Daisy von Scherler Mayer.

This marks the first appearance of Colby Minifie as Virginia.

== Plot ==
In a sequence of flashbacks, a more cheerful Logan is shown placing a supply crate on the side of the road. He receives a call for help from a woman, Serena, who is trapped by a herd of walkers at a gas station. Logan asks Clayton for support over the radio, but he doesn't answer. He makes a desperate attempt to save Serena, but is too late as the walkers devour her (it is revealed that Clayton was unable to help because Sarah and Wendell stole his truck during the hurricane).

A distraught Logan is soon found by a group riding on horseback, led by a woman named Virginia. She says she has been watching him and shares his vision. In the present, Logan's crew arrive at the oil field and a standoff ensues, with Logan declaring they are taking all of the oil. The smoke and fire from the oil field attract countless walkers, forcing everyone to take shelter. A reluctant Sarah saves Logan's life as they hide in an office. Meanwhile, Alicia and Strand receive a call from a woman holed up in the same gas station Serena was.

Logan, who is listening, encourages the woman to commit suicide, but she is rescued by Wes. Alicia and Strand arrive, but the woman says they need to leave before the people she ran away from show up. The next morning, the oil field walkers are dispatched and the standoff resumes. Logan appears to have a change of heart, but he and his crew are viciously gunned down by another group. Virginia arrives, and feels they can all help each other. Her offer is declined, and when it appears Virginia is about to have everyone killed, Luciana offers to stay behind to help make gas if everyone else can leave. Virginia agrees, but lets everyone know her offer still stands.

== Reception ==
"Leave What You Don't" received critical acclaim, despite most episodes in the season receiving either mixed or poor reviews. It currently holds a 93% rating, the best reviewed episode of the season and is the best reviewed episode on the site since the fourth season premiere, with an average score of 7.5/10 out of 14 on the review aggregator Rotten Tomatoes. The critics' consensus reads: "'Leave What You Can' helps shake the season from its narrative lethargy by dispatching a subpar antagonist in favor of a new villain who makes a bold impression."

Alexander Zalben of Decider praised the episode and wrote: "After weeks of playing nice, proving that even in the zombie apocalypse there's no problem that can't be solved with a hug and a laugh, the show proved with this week's episode, "Leave What You Don't," that it's still the sibling to The Walking Dead." However, Erik Kain of Forbes was negative about the episode and wrote: "Even these more action-packed episodes, even ones with a big twist like this, somehow manage to remain boring."

=== Rating ===
The episode was seen by 1.45 million viewers in the United States on its original air date, above the previous episodes.
