= Is There Anybody Out There =

Is There Anybody Out There may refer to:

- Is There Anybody Out There?, a song from the Pink Floyd album, The Wall.
- Is There Anybody Out There? The Wall Live 1980–81, 2000 live album by Pink Floyd
- Is There Anybody Out There?, a song by Beyond the Black
- Is There Anybody Out There? (album), 2014 debut album by A Great Big World
- "Is There Anybody Out There" (Nicki French song), 1995
- "Is There Anybody Out There?", a song on the Roger Daltrey album Parting Should Be Painless
- "Is There Anybody Out There?", a stand-alone single by American band Machine Head
- "Is There Anybody Out There?", a song by Bassheads which samples the Pink Floyd track.

== See also ==
- Is There Anybody There? (film), 1976 Australian TV movie directed by Peter Maxwell
- Is Anybody Out There? (song), song by K'naan featuring singer-songwriter Nelly Furtado
- "Is Anybody Out There?" (Fear the Walking Dead), a 2019 episode of the TV series Fear the Walking Dead
- Is Anybody There?, a 2008 British film
- Anybody Out There?, a 2007 novel by Marian Keyes
- Anybody Out There, a 2010 album by Rufio
