= Channel 4 (Fear the Walking Dead) =

- Fear the Walking Dead episode
- Episode no.: Season 5 Episode 9
- Directed by: Dan Liu
- Written by: David Johnson
- Original air date: August 11, 2019
- Running time: 46 minutes

Guest appearances
- Matt Frewer as Logan; Mo Collins as Sarah Rabinowitz; Colby Hollman as Wes Rabinowitz

Episode chronology
← Previous "Is Anybody Out There?"	Next → "210 Words Per Minute"
- Fear the Walking Dead (season 5)

"Channel 4" is the ninth episode and mid-season premiere of the fifth season of the post-apocalyptic horror television series Fear the Walking Dead, which aired on AMC on August 11, 2019. The episode was written by David Johnson and directed by Dan Liu.

This episode marks the first appearance of recurring character Wes (Colby Hollman), who was upgraded to series regular status the following season.

== Plot ==
Much of the episode is presented in documentary video. Althea interviews the entire group to document how things have changed since the group escaped from the radioactive zone: the group is traveling in a caravan, but June is working to find a safe haven for the group; Alicia has stopped killing walkers and is struggling to find a new purpose; Dwight is grateful to find the group, but still hopes to find Sherry; Sarah reveals that Logan's oil truck was stolen and abandoned.

Morgan tells a story in which he and several others helped a woman, Tess, get medicine for her son and convinced them to leave their home for the first time since the outbreak. The film concludes with everyone pleading with future survivors to help others in any way they can.

The tape is then revealed to be being watched by another survivor, Wes, who is at a gas station. As he prepares to leave, Logan's crew shows up and steals his gas before destroying his motorcycle. Logan tells Wes to call Morgan for help and to let him know that they are making more enemies than friends. Logan's crew leaves Wes behind as a pack of walkers approach.

== Reception ==
"Channel 4" received mixed reviews. It currently holds a 64% positive rating with an average score of 7/10 out of 14 on the review aggregator Rotten Tomatoes. The critics' consensus reads: "Although a change in format livens up Fear the Walking Dead's midseason premiere, 'Channel 4' does little to jumpstart the season's narrative momentum."

Liam Mathews of TV Guide praised the episode and wrote: "It was a clever-enough break from format with a fun action sequence and some nice character development for Morgan, if you can put aside the "what is even happening anymore" feeling that'has descended on Season 5." Writing for Geek Girl Authority, Noetta Harjo praised the episode and said: "I really liked this episode. We got to hear what everyone was thinking as to why they needed to help others. And how they plan to accomplish their goals."

=== Rating ===
The episode was seen by 1.40 million viewers in the United States on its original air date, far below the previous episodes.
