= Fear the Walking Dead season 5 =

Fear the Walking Dead
- Season 5
- Promotional poster
- Showrunners: Andrew Chambliss; Ian Goldberg
- Starring: Lennie James; Alycia Debnam-Carey; Maggie Grace; Colman Domingo; Danay García; Garret Dillahunt; Alexa Nisenson; Jenna Elfman; Rubén Blades; Karen David; Austin Amelio
- No. of episodes: 16

Release
- Original network: AMC
- Original release: June 2 – September 29, 2019

Season chronology
- ← Previous; Season 4 Next → Season 6

The fifth season of Fear the Walking Dead, an American horror-drama television series on AMC, premiered on June 2, 2019, and concluded on September 29, 2019, consisting of sixteen episodes. The series is a companion series to The Walking Dead, which is based on the comic book series of the same name by Robert Kirkman, Tony Moore, and Charlie Adlard, with the season containing the second crossover character between the two series with the introduction of Dwight (Austin Amelio), the first being Morgan Jones in the fourth season. The executive producers are Kirkman, David Alpert, Greg Nicotero, Gale Anne Hurd, Scott M. Gimple, Andrew Chambliss, and Ian B. Goldberg, with Chambliss and Goldberg as showrunners for the second consecutive season.

The season follows the group of survivors led by Morgan Jones (Lennie James) and Alicia Clark (Alycia Debnam-Carey) as they search for other survivors, looking to provide help for others in an effort to make up for the wrongdoings from their pasts.

== Cast ==
The fifth season featured eleven actors receiving main cast billing status, with eight returning from the fourth season, while three new cast members are introduced. Rubén Blades returned in the fifth season as Daniel Salazar, who didn't appear at all in the fourth season. Austin Amelio (who was a main cast member in The Walking Dead), moved to the main cast after his departure from The Walking Dead. Alexa Nisenson was promoted from recurring status and Karen David was added to the main cast. This was the first season not to include Kim Dickens and Frank Dillane, who were both credited as main cast members in previous seasons.

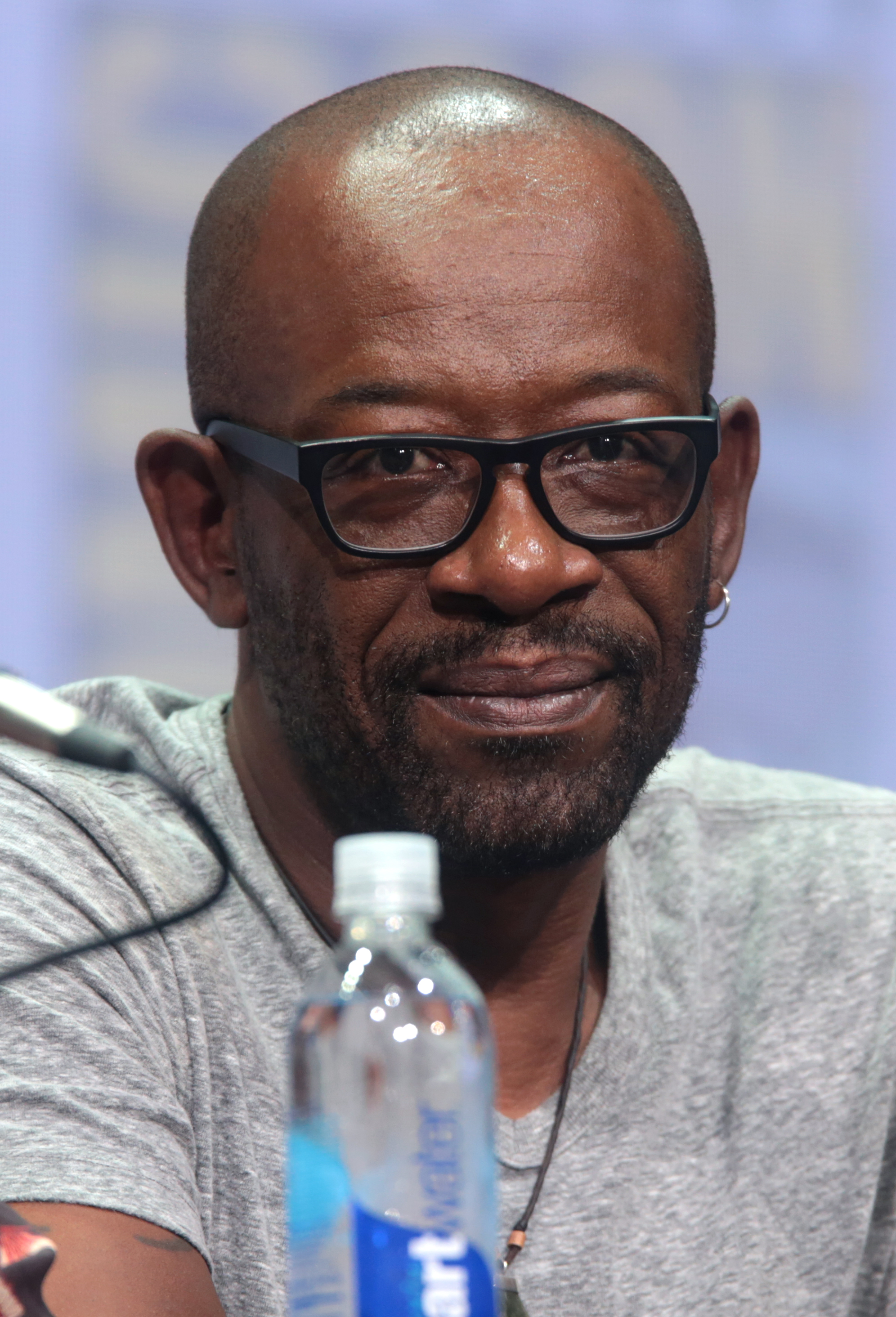
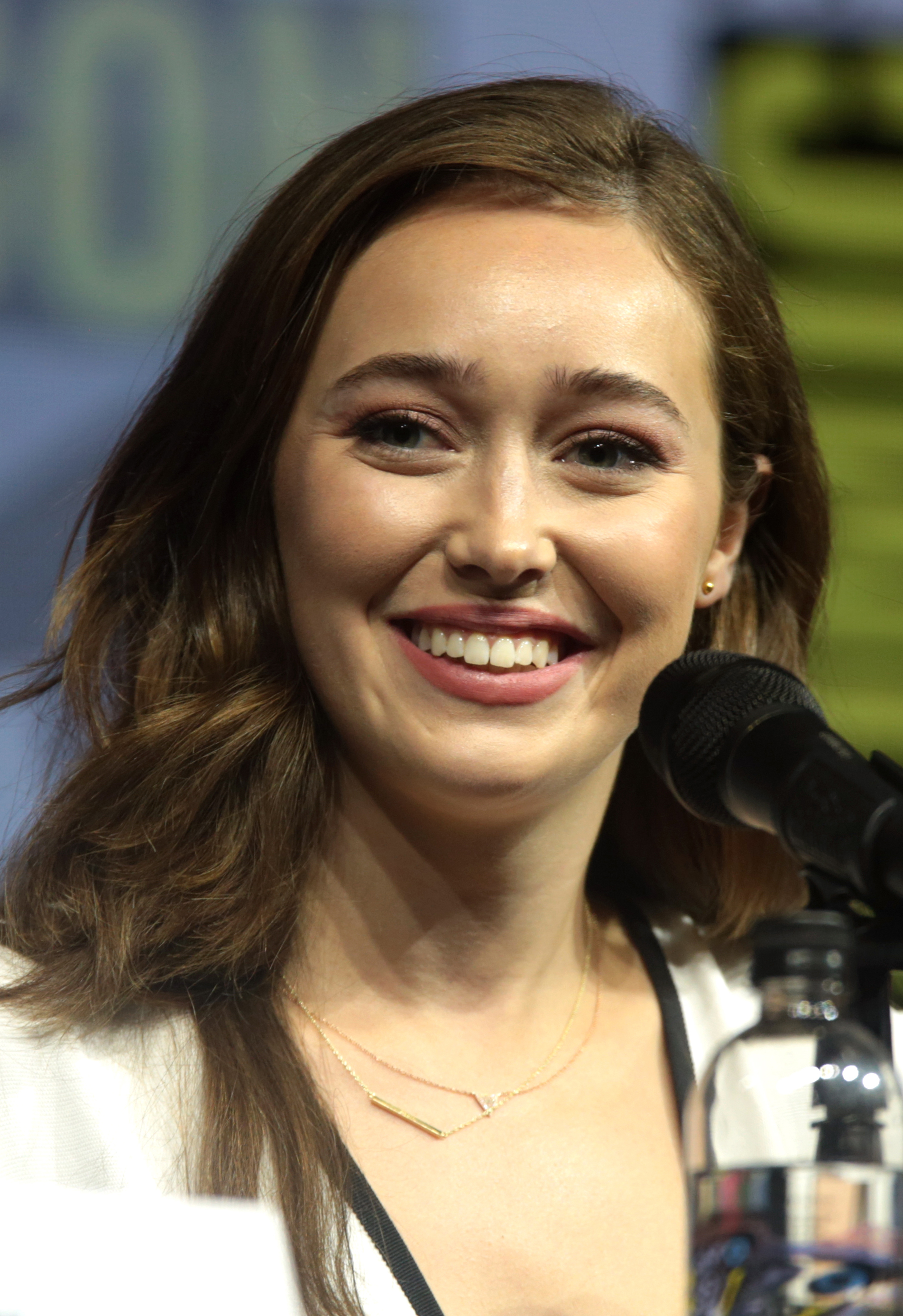
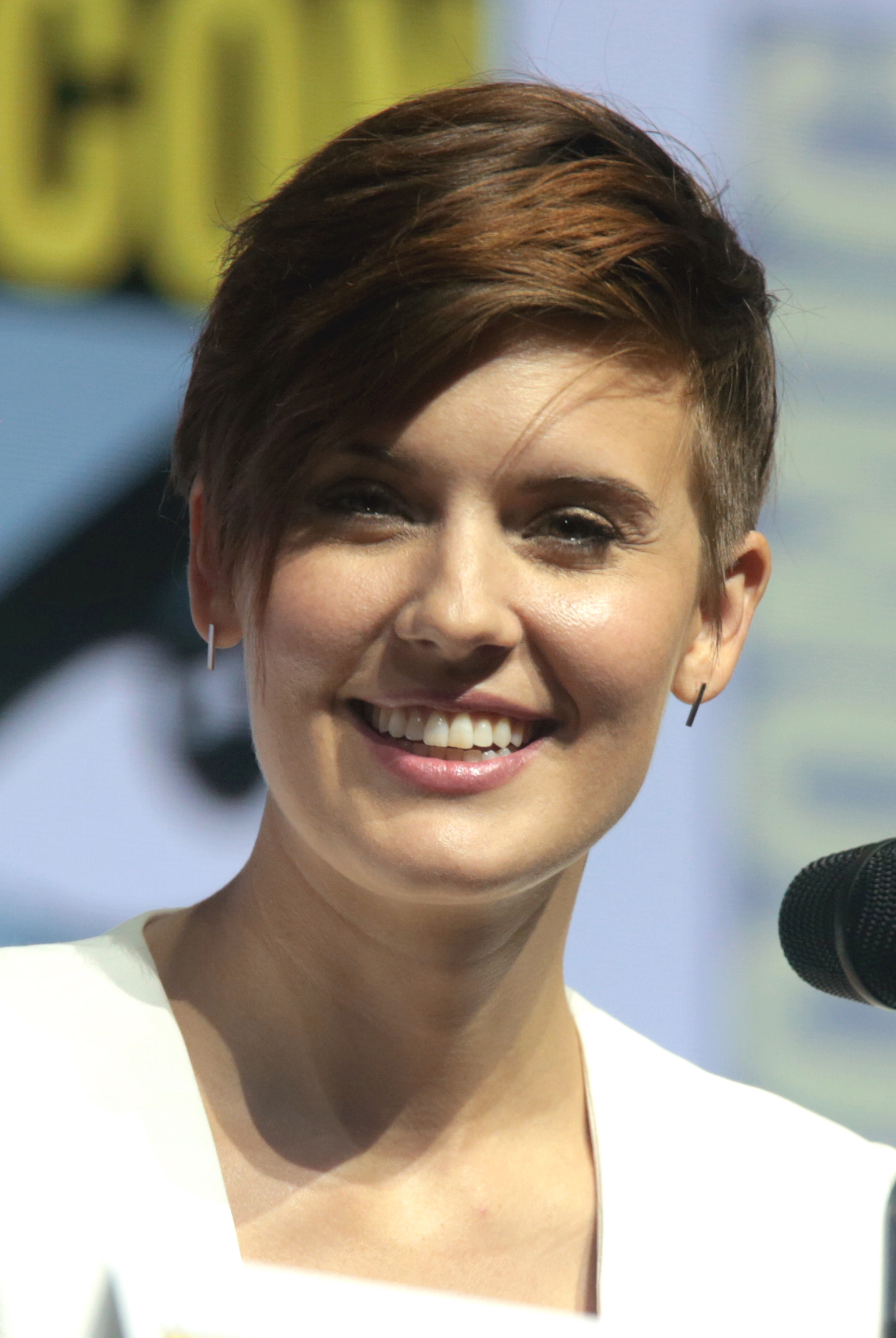
Lennie James (Morgan Jones), Alycia Debnam-Carey (Alicia Clark), and Maggie Grace (Althea Szewczyk-Przygocki)
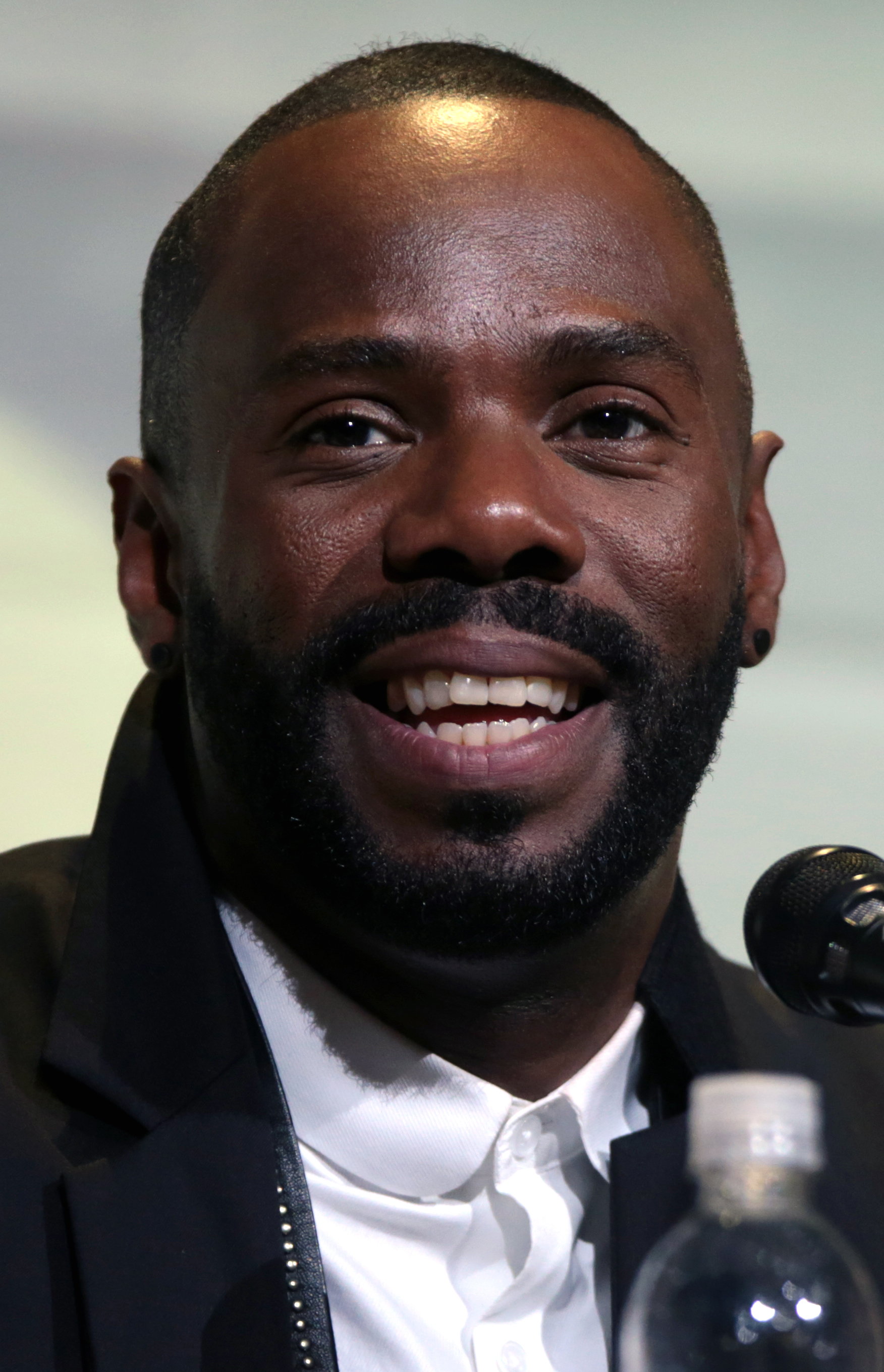
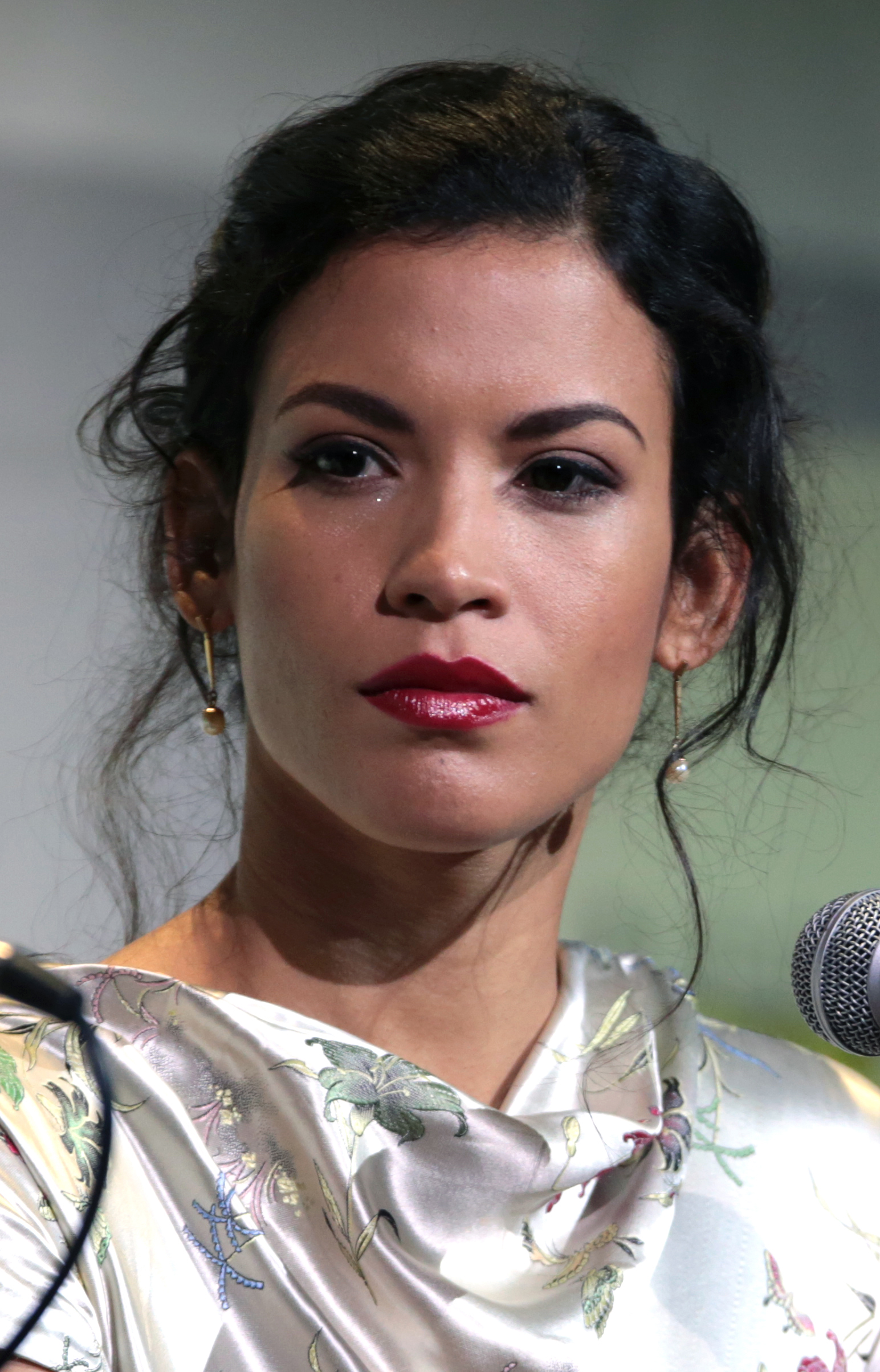
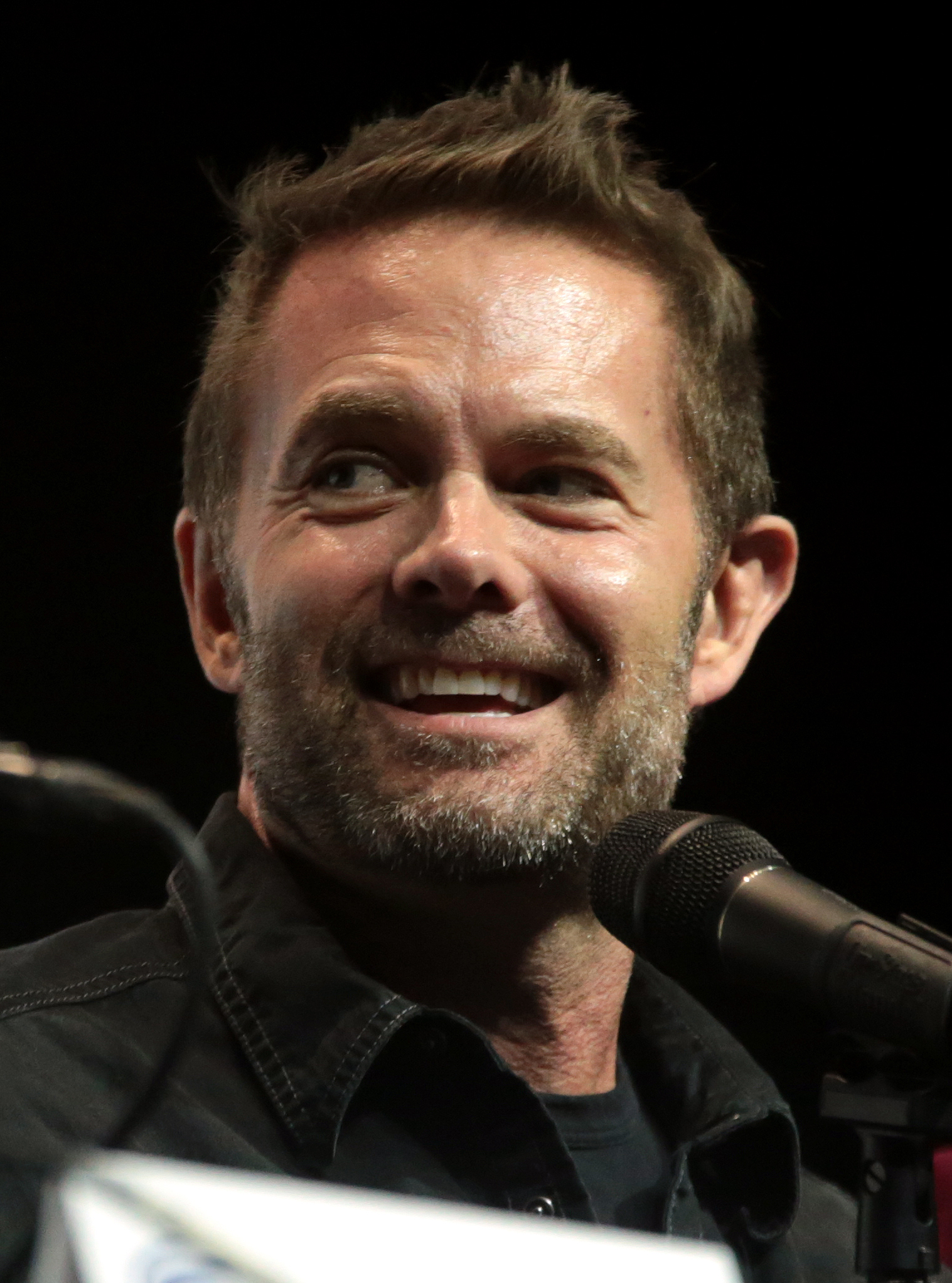
Colman Domingo (Victor Strand), Danay García (Luciana Galvez), and Garret Dillahunt (John Dorie)
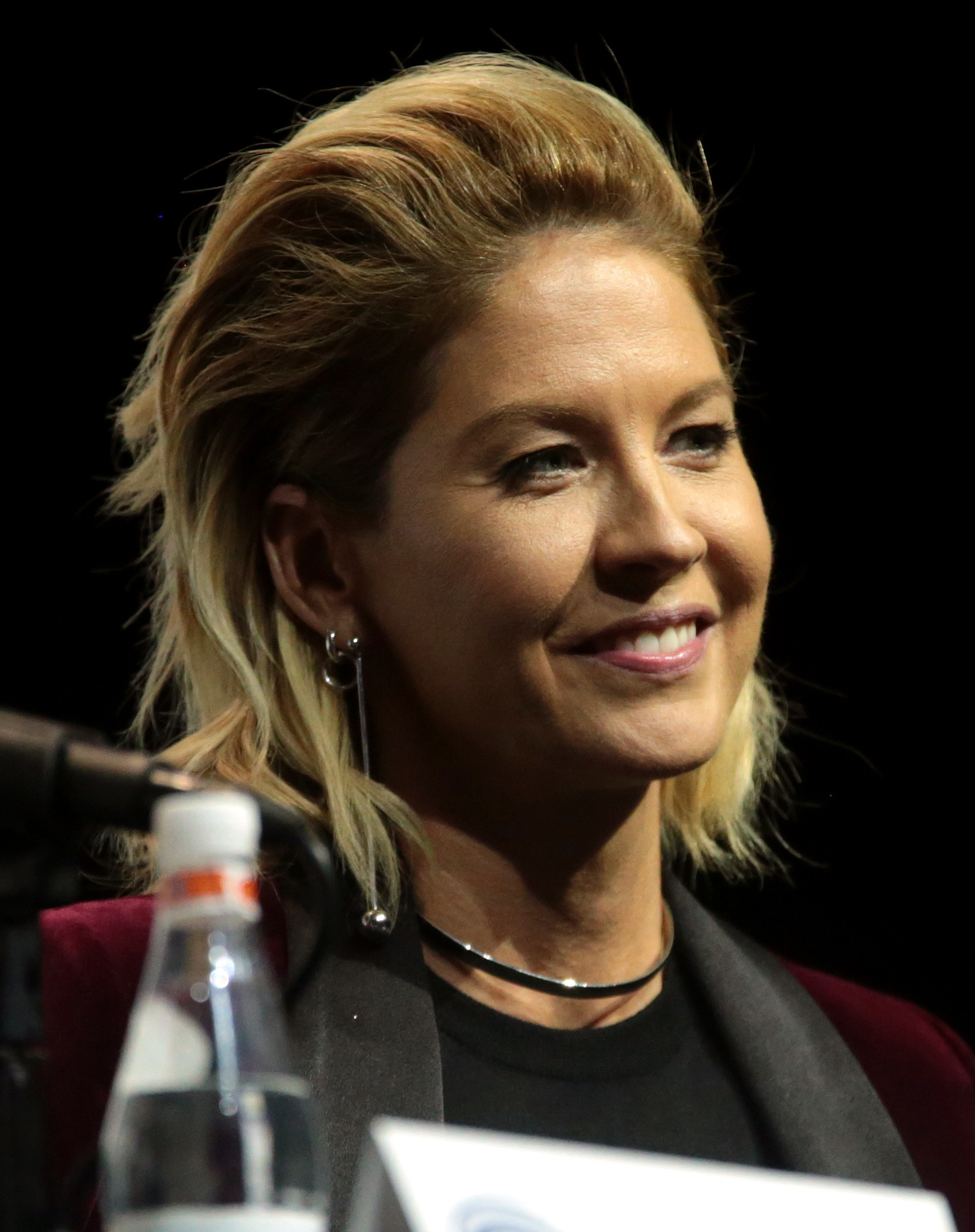
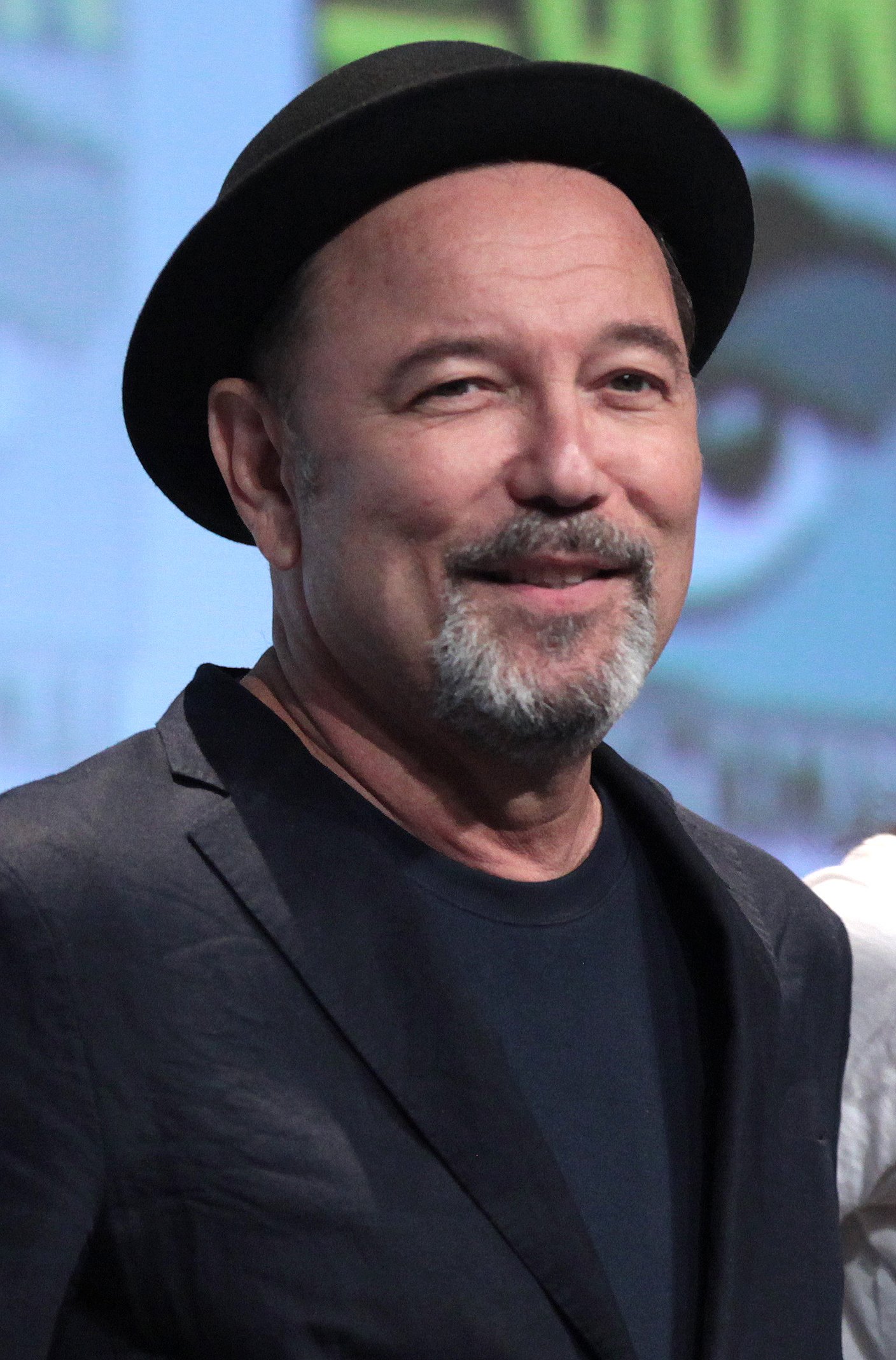
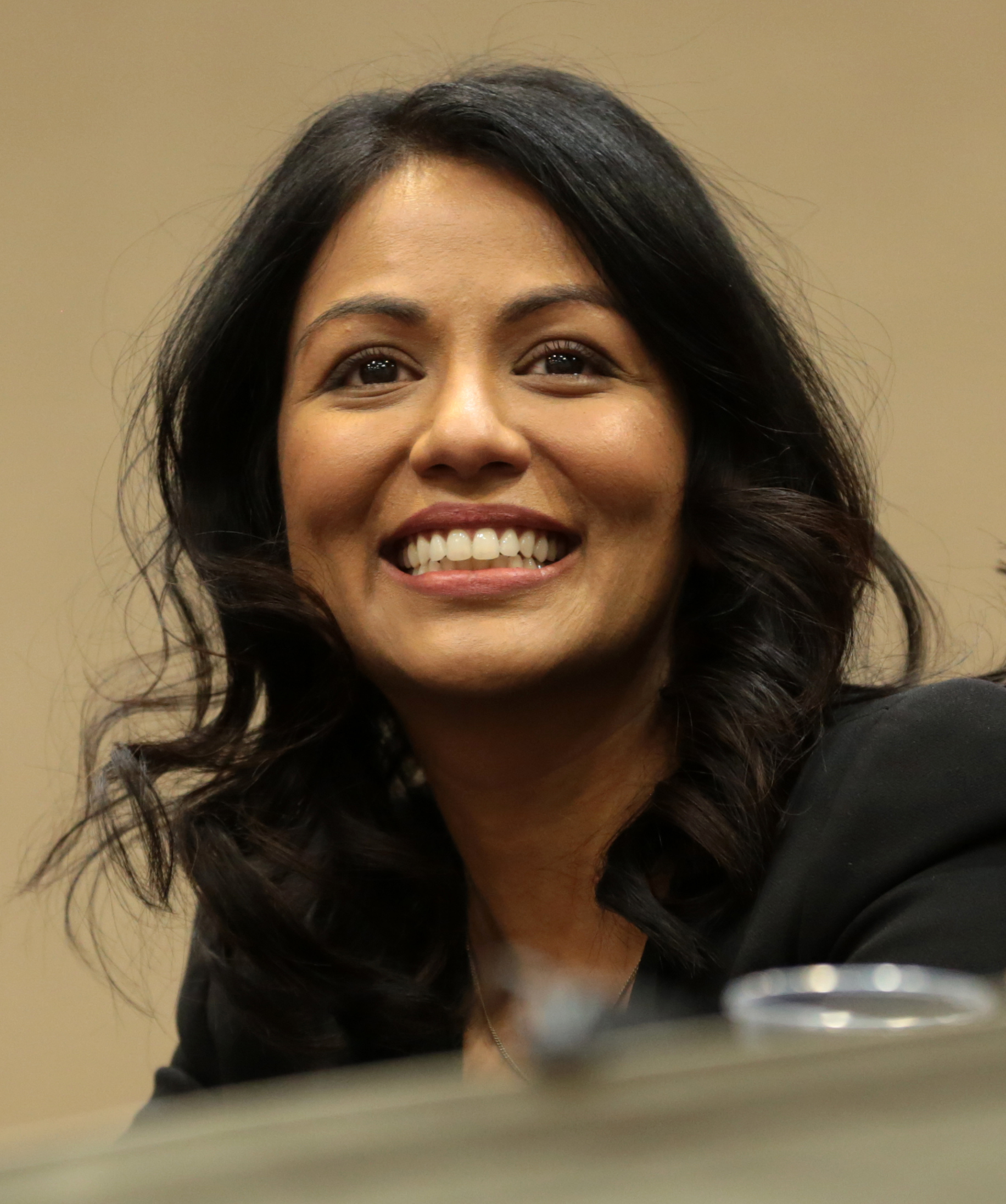
Jenna Elfman (June), Rubén Blades (Daniel Salazar), and Karen David (Grace Mukherjee)

=== Main cast ===
- Lennie James as Morgan Jones: A pragmatic man, formerly a part of Rick Grimes' group on The Walking Dead, who leads a pacifist agenda.
- Alycia Debnam-Carey as Alicia Clark: The fiery yet compassionate daughter of Madison, and Nick's sister.
- Maggie Grace as Althea "Al" Szewczyk-Przygocki: A curious and tactical journalist.
- Colman Domingo as Victor Strand: A smart and sophisticated conman-turned-businessman, who formed friendships with Madison and Alicia.
- Danay García as Luciana Galvez: A strong and cautious former member of the La Colonia community in Tijuana, Mexico, and Nick's former girlfriend.
- Garret Dillahunt as John Dorie: A lonesome and friendly police officer who is in a relationship with June.
- Alexa Nisenson as Charlie: A young girl who was a spy for the Vultures until she defected to Morgan's group.
- Jenna Elfman as June: A kind nurse who is in a relationship with John.
- Rubén Blades as Daniel Salazar: A courageous and pragmatic former Sombra Negra member, previously missing since the destruction of the Gonzales dam.
- Karen David as Grace Mukherjee: A mysterious woman who used to work at a nuclear power plant that melted down near the site where the plane of Morgan's group crashed.
- Austin Amelio as Dwight: A reluctant former lieutenant of the Saviors, who was exiled from Virginia by Rick Grimes' group on The Walking Dead. He is currently searching for his missing wife Sherry, who disappeared after fleeing the Saviors.

=== Supporting cast ===
- Mo Collins as Sarah Rabinowitz: The adoptive sister of Wendell and a former Marine.
- Daryl Mitchell as Wendell: The adoptive brother of Sarah who uses a wheelchair.
- Matt Frewer as Logan "Desert Fox": The former partner of Clayton (aka "Polar Bear") who tricks Morgan's group and seizes the denim factory for himself.
- Cooper Dodson as Dylan: Annie and Max's younger brother.
- Bailey Gavulic as Annie: A teenage survivor and sister to Dylan and Max.
- Ethan Suess as Max: A teenage survivor and brother to Annie and Dylan.
- Sydney Lemmon as Isabelle: A CRM pilot who befriends Althea.
- Mikala Gibson as Doris: Logan's right-hand woman.
- Cory Hart as Rollie: A member of Logan's Crew who clashes with Dwight.
- Colby Hollman as Wes: A nihilistic painter who allies with Morgan's group.
- Peter Jacobson as Jacob Kessner: A rabbi who joins Morgan's group.
- Colby Minifie as Virginia: An antagonistic leader of the Pioneers.
- Holly Curran as Janis: A woman who called Alicia and Strand for help and was saved by Wes. She later joined Morgan's group. She is Tom's sister.

=== Guest cast ===
- Peggy Schott as Tess: A woman who lived with her son and husband and had never left home until her husband died.
- Joe Massingill as Tom: A man who was being wanted by Virginia and who stole gas from Morgan and Al. He later joined Morgan's group. He is the brother of Janis.

== Episodes ==
No. overall	No. in season	Title	Directed by	Written by	Original release date	U.S. viewers (millions)
54	1	"Here to Help"	Michael E. Satrazemis	Ian Goldberg & Andrew Chambliss	June 2, 2019	1.97
While trying to help a man named Logan, Alicia, Dorie, June, Morgan and Luciana get into a plane crash, leaving Luciana seriously injured. They later encounter a group of children, led by Annie, Max and Dylan, as well as strange traps and signs warning of high radiation in the area. The children run off while the group is shocked to learn that Logan is actually Clayton's former partner who lured them as far away as possible so that he could take over their denim factory base. Althea investigates a strange walker wearing body armor, only to be captured by more of the man's group. As the rest of the group plans to retake the factory, Strand investigates a man on one of Althea's tapes who has a plane they can use to rescue their friends. To Strand's shock, the man is Daniel Salazar, who has not been seen since the destruction of the Gonzales dam.
55	2	"The Hurt That Will Happen"	Jessica Lowrey	Alex Delyle	June 9, 2019	1.69
After encountering another roadblock warning of high radiation while searching for the missing Althea, Morgan encounters a woman named Grace while dispatching two walkers in a trap. She explains that due to a power plant meltdown the year before, there are over sixty radioactive walkers in the area. Simply getting close to the walkers risks survivors becoming contaminated, causing Morgan to permanently lose his contaminated staff. As the former manager of the plant, Grace blames herself for the deaths of her friends and is on a mission to find and eliminate the radioactive walkers, herself terminally ill with radiation sickness. John and June locate the campground where the children possibly came from, only to discover that the residents succumbed to radiation sickness. Grace sets out on her own to hunt down the rest, promising to keep in touch. At the same time, Victor tracks down Daniel, who helps him make contact with Luciana. Though convinced of the problem, Daniel refuses to lend his plane to Victor who he feels will only make things worse based on past experiences. After passing out following a walker attack, Luciana wakes up to discover that someone has cut off walker heads and strung them from a billboard at the truck stop, causing the group to become convinced that they are getting close to something someone does not want them to see.
56	3	"Humbug's Gulch"	Colman Domingo	Ashley Cardiff	June 16, 2019	1.76
The group begins plotting out the locations of the walker roadblocks while Alicia begins searching for Max's family after hearing a message by them over the radio. John and June come under attack and take shelter in Humbug's Gulch, a ghost town that once acted as a theme park attraction. As they retrieve guns from the saloon during a dust storm, Dwight attacks, eventually revealing that he is searching for his missing wife, Sherry. Dwight's search has taken him from Virginia to Texas, following notes from Sherry who is on the run from "bad people". Dwight gets trapped by a herd while searching a car for the next clue, which turns out to be a dead end. June talks Dwight out of suicide and the three eliminate the herd together. Using his experience as a cop, John determines that Dwight was searching the wrong car and Sherry may still be out there. Dwight and Morgan are reunited for the first time since the war with the Saviors and put the past behind them. Dwight leads the group to the biggest walker roadblock yet, but they are interrupted by a call from Max. The group finds a bloodied Dylan while Max and Annie set up another walker roadblock and plot to use Dylan to find out why Morgan's group is in the area before making sure they are not a threat to them.
57	4	"Skidmark"	Tara Nicole Weyr	Samir Mehta	June 23, 2019	1.66
Strand, Charlie, Sarah and Wendell attempt to steal Daniel's plane, but he anticipates their move and disables it. After accidentally hitching a ride with Daniel, Charlie discovers he is disarming deadly traps set by Logan. Daniel's cat Skidmark accidentally releases a herd while at one such trap and Daniel sends Charlie ahead while he lures the herd back. Daniel reveals that he is angry at Strand not for being shot in the face, but for Strand lying to him about Ofelia, preventing Daniel from seeing his daughter alive again. Strand and the others rush to Daniel's rescue and Strand uses the plane to eliminate the herd, damaging the engines beyond repair. Daniel forgives Strand and gives the group use of his warehouse while he continues his mission. At the same time, Morgan and Alicia search for Althea and discover in the process that Max, Annie and Dylan are part of a larger group of kids, the children of the people who died of radiation sickness at a nearby camp. The kids lead them to the camp of the people who took Althea, only to witness the people fly away in a helicopter. Meanwhile, Dylan and Luciana repair the truck stop's long-range antenna and contact Strand who informs them of the plane's fate. Dylan suggests that the group repair their crashed plane to escape.
58	5	"The End of Everything"	Michael E. Satrazemis	Andrew Chambliss & Ian Goldberg	June 30, 2019	1.71
After being kidnapped, Althea meets a young woman named Isabelle who works for the mysterious group with the helicopter. Althea hides her tape showing the zombified member of the group, Beckett, so Isabelle is forced to cooperate with Althea, who seeks information on the secretive group and its activities. With Isabelle's helicopter out of fuel and only three days before another team is sent to the area, Althea helps Isabelle make a treacherous climb to get the needed supplies while revealing her own guilt over her brother's death when Althea chose to chase a story instead of staying with him. Isabelle reveals that her group is focusing on the future and rebuilding to the point that its mission is more important than anything and anyone. After Beckett went insane after witnessing the effects of the radiation from the melting down power plant, she was forced to kill him. Althea eventually leads Isabelle to the tape and destroys it, but Isabelle chooses not to kill her due to their mutual attraction. Isabelle leaves in the helicopter with the tape of Althea's brother's story, lying to her people about encountering anyone. Althea reunites with Morgan, Alicia and Annie's group and also lies about what she learned, keeping her promise to Isabelle. Inspired by her experiences, Althea reveals her last name to her friends, finally giving out some personal information about herself.
59	6	"The Little Prince"	Sharat Raju	Mallory Westfall	July 7, 2019	1.49
Morgan's group brings the plane wreckage to the truck stop and set to work repairing it with the help of the children. However, the plane's propellers break in an attempt to start it up. Annie decides to take the other children and leave and explains the events surrounding the loss of their parents at the camp the group found. Grace contacts Morgan to reveal that the power plant's second reactor will soon meltdown. Grace and Morgan come up with a plan to use the truck stop's generator to delay the meltdown, but Grace does not believe it can be stopped completely and it will kill anyone left in the area when it happens. Rather than risk Morgan's life, Grace heads off on her own to try to buy them time. Dwight and John continue the search for Sherry. John finds a note from Sherry asking Dwight to give up the search, but keeps it a secret. After struggling to find a solution, Strand and Charlie arrive to help with the propellers from Daniel's plane using Jim Brauer's old hot air balloon. However, the balloon crashes in a field within the radioactive zone. As Morgan rushes to help them and Alicia searches for the kids, Strand and Charlie are surrounded by walkers, some of which are radioactive.
60	7	"Still Standing"	Marta Cunningham	Richard Naing	July 14, 2019	1.39
John and Dwight continue their search for Sherry until they run of gas. Running out of time before the meltdown, John tells Dwight the truth. Though Dwight decides to keep hope alive that he will find Sherry, he rededicates himself to helping John return to his friends. Charlie and Strand take cover from the herd using the balloon until Morgan rescues them. Morgan aids Grace in repairing the generator, delaying the meltdown. Morgan convinces Grace to not give up on living and she joins them. Althea leads June to the fuel dump Isabelle led her to in order to retrieve more fuel for the plane and tells her a bit about meeting Isabelle. Alicia reaches the camp of Annie's group and struggles to convince them to leave. After a herd arrives, Annie agrees to join them in leaving the area. Alicia draws the herd away, but is exposed to radiation when she gets splashed in the face with the blood of a radioactive walker she kills. Later, sirens go off at the power plant, signaling a full nuclear meltdown.
61	8	"Is Anybody Out There?"	Michael E. Satrazemis	Michael Alaimo	July 21, 2019	1.60
The power plant melts down and the containment building explodes, releasing a cloud of radioactive dust into the air that threatens everyone's life. Separated from the rest of the group, John and Dwight struggle to find their way back, but are helped by another message from Sherry which leads them to a working car. John later proposes to June, who accepts. Alicia is decontaminated by Grace, but is left unsure of how much radiation she absorbed or its future effects on her health. Chased by a herd, Morgan, Grace and Alicia make it back to the plane in time to escape. With the help of Daniel, Sarah and Wendell are able to create a runway using Christmas lights. Despite a mishap with some walkers, the plane lands safely and Daniel and Alicia are reunited for the first time in years. At the same time, Logan's crew wrecks the denim factory in search of something without success, leading them to abandon Logan. Later, Morgan's group gets a call for help, but are intercepted by Logan, who seeks their help in finding an oil field Clayton had set up to deal with the problem of gasoline going bad. Seemingly remorseful over his past actions, Logan says they must find the field before his former crew does, as it's their only chance of reaching people who need their help.
62	9	"Channel 4"	Dan Liu	David Johnson	August 11, 2019	1.40
Much of the episode is presented in a found-footage/documentary format. Althea interviews the entire group to document how things have changed since escaping the radioactive zone: The group travels in a caravan, but June is working to find the group a permanent home; Alicia has stopped killing walkers and is struggling to find a new purpose; Dwight is thankful for finding the group, but still hopes to find Sherry; Sarah reveals they stole Logan's oil truck and abandoned him. Morgan tells a story where he and several others helped a woman, Tess, get medicine for her son and convinced them to leave their house for the first time since the outbreak. The tape concludes with everyone pleading with future survivors to help others in any way they can. It is then revealed that the tape is being watched by another survivor, Wes, who is at a gas station. He considers reaching out, but decides against it. As he prepares to leave, Logan's crew shows up and steals his gas before destroying his motorcycle. Logan tells Wes to call Morgan for help, and to let him know they are making more enemies than friends. Logan's crew leave Wes behind as a herd of walkers approach.
63	10	"210 Words Per Minute"	Ron Underwood	Ian Goldberg & Andrew Chambliss	August 18, 2019	1.37
Morgan, Dwight and Grace receive a call from Chuck, a man who works at a nearby shopping mall. Chuck has been bitten and wishes to be killed before he turns. At the mall, Grace starts to feel the effects of the radiation sickness and briefly passes out. Dwight leaves to get medical supplies and vows to return with the caravan the next morning. Alone at the mall, Morgan and Grace share details about their past lives and grow closer together. They find an Urgent Care center, but when they try to get in, a security alarm is triggered, drawing the attention of walkers. As Dwight returns to the caravan, he is captured by Rollie, a member of Logan's crew. Rollie taunts Dwight about Sherry, but Dwight quickly gets the upper hand. Rather than killing him, Dwight decides to free Rollie, but orders him to leave the area and never return. After fighting off the walkers, Morgan and Grace find Chuck on the roof, where he dies peacefully. Grace decides not to utilize the Urgent Care center, not wanting to worry about how much time she has left. The following morning, Morgan and Grace bury Chuck as the caravan arrives. Morgan decides to go support Althea on a separate supply run, leaving Grace behind without admitting his true feelings toward her.
64	11	"You're Still Here"	K.C. Colwell	Mallory Westfall & Alex Delyle	August 25, 2019	1.44
During a scouting trip with Strand, Alicia finds another painted tree with the message "If you're reading this, you're still here" on it. They are contacted by Wes, who explains his run-in with Logan. Alicia and Strand give Wes a ride to his shelter, which is a nearby police station. When Wes goes inside, gunshots are heard and an injured man runs out and steals their truck. Elsewhere, Morgan and Althea enter a bank, where Althea puts her tapes of interviews in a safety deposit box. They pick up a distress call from Alicia and attempt to track down the injured man and the stolen truck, but their progress is halted by Logan's crew. Alicia, Strand and Wes escape the police station and track down the injured man. He attempts to strangle Wes, but Wes overpowers him and stabs him before asking where a manuscript is. The man tells Wes it's in his bag before dying. Alicia angrily questions why Wes would kill someone over a manuscript; Wes only says "people are people" before walking away. While looking through the manuscript, Alicia discovers the phrase from the trees on the final page, and realizes Wes was the one painting them. That night, Logan's crew breaks into the bank and steals Althea's tapes, hoping to learn the location of the oil field.
65	12	"Ner Tamid"	Michael E. Satrazemis	Andrew Chambliss & Ian Goldberg	September 1, 2019	1.14
Frustrated with not having found a new home yet, Charlie runs away from the group and ends up at a synagogue. There she is rescued by Rabbi Jacob Kessner, who offers her shelter for the night. After helping him fix a light, Charlie believes they can fortify the temple and create a new settlement for the group. John and June arrive, who say it won't work because it's too small and there is no water supply. Charlie has to abandon the idea when walkers breach the temple, forcing everyone to flee. Meanwhile, some of Logan's crew discover the caravan's location and give chase to Sarah and Dwight, who are in the oil truck. They eventually run out of gas, but Logan's crew surprisingly leaves without conflict. Sarah is relieved, but Dwight wonders if it was a ruse. Elsewhere, Logan arrives at the oil fields, having discovered the location through Althea's tapes.
66	13	"Leave What You Don't"	Daisy von Scherler Mayer	Ashley Cardiff & Nick Bernardone	September 8, 2019	1.45
Flashbacks show a more cheerful Logan placing a supply box on the side of the road. He receives a distress call from a woman, Serena, who is trapped by walkers at a gas station. Logan radios Clayton for help, but he doesn't answer. He makes a desperate attempt to rescue Serena, but arrives too late and she is devoured by walkers (it is revealed that Clayton was unable to help because Sarah and Wendell stole his truck during the hurricane). A distraught Logan is soon found by a group riding on horseback, led by a woman named Virginia. She says she has been watching him and shares his vision. In the present, Logan's crew arrive at the oil field and a standoff ensues, with Logan declaring they are taking all of the oil. The smoke and fire from the oil field attract countless walkers, forcing everyone to take shelter. A reluctant Sarah saves Logan's life as they hide in an office. Meanwhile, Alicia and Strand receive a call from a woman holed up in the same gas station Serena was. Logan, who is listening, encourages the woman to commit suicide, but she is rescued by Wes. Alicia and Strand arrive, but the woman says they need to leave before the people she ran away from show up. The next morning, the oil field walkers are dispatched and the standoff resumes. Logan appears to have a change of heart, but he and his crew are viciously gunned down by another group. Virginia arrives, and feels they can all help each other. Her offer is declined, and when it appears Virginia is about to have everyone killed, Luciana offers to stay behind to help make gas if everyone else can leave. Virginia agrees, but lets everyone know her offer still stands.
67	14	"Today and Tomorrow"	Sydney Freeland	Richard Naing & David Johnson	September 15, 2019	1.31
While on a supply run, Grace and Daniel fall into trouble when their truck breaks down and they are chased by a herd. Hiding in an abandoned bar, Daniel explains that it was Charlie who pulled him out of his isolation. Working with Althea, Morgan delays returning to the convoy, eventually admitting it's due to his blossoming relationship with Grace. The two rescue a man named Tom from some of Virginia's pioneers and Tom's story makes Althea wonder if the group is connected to Isabelle. Morgan and Althea break into a condo complex Tom had been living in to search for Tom's sister, Janis, but find her gone and they are captured by Virginia. She appears to know nothing about the helicopter group and releases the two, urging them to join her cause. Morgan opens up to Althea about his lost family while she reveals her experiences with Isabelle. Trying to reconcile with Grace, Morgan learns that she has again fallen ill and she feels she does not have much longer to live.
68	15	"Channel 5"	David Barrett	Michael Alaimo & Samir Mehta	September 22, 2019	1.34
Virginia creates a documentary to lure people to join the Pioneers, which inspires Althea to create a new documentary to counter Virginia's message. Grace's condition continues to deteriorate. Tom is reunited with his sister Janis, who turns out to be the woman rescued by Wes, and dedicates himself to helping create the documentary to show people the differences between the two factions. As the group tries to cross a damaged bridge, they are confronted by Virginia, who offers to help them cross, as well as information on the whereabouts of Sherry, if they join her. When no one steps forward, Virginia summons a herd of walkers to force their hand in needing her help. Most of the group makes it to safety, but Tom is killed when the bridge collapses, and the group also loses the oil tanker and most of their supplies. They press onto Humbug's Gulch, a nearby Old West-style theme park where John thinks they can safely settle down, but it is surrounded by a massive herd of walkers. Feeling they have no other option, Morgan calls Virginia for help, while Dwight departs in anger over the decision.
69	16	"End of the Line"	Michael E. Satrazemis	Ian Goldberg & Andrew Chambliss	September 29, 2019	1.51
After hallucinating Sherry's voice, Dwight finds a group of horses near the remnants of the caravan and returns to help. The group clears Humbug's Gulch of walkers, revealed to be the previous survivors who used the location before Virginia slaughtered them for resisting her. They decide to use the walkers to ambush the Pioneers, but are forced to abandon the plan when they discover that Luciana is with them. Knowing Virginia is on her way, the group enjoys their remaining time together, as John and June are finally married. When Virginia arrives, she splits the group up amongst her various communities and gets a doctor to look at Grace, who is revealed to be pregnant and malnourished, not dying. Once everyone is gone, Virginia shoots Morgan and leaves him to die as walkers approach. Morgan broadcasts a message to his friends, encouraging them to "just live" as the walkers close in on him.

== Production ==
In July 2018, AMC renewed the series for a fifth season. Andrew Chambliss and Ian Goldberg have been the showrunners since the fourth season.

=== Casting ===
In December 2018, it was reported that Rubén Blades would return in the fifth season as Daniel Salazar. It was also reported that Daniel Sharman would return as Troy Otto, however, in April 2019, showrunner Ian Goldberg confirmed he would not return, stating "Yes, that's just a rumor. We thought he was awesome on the show, but he's not returning." In January 2019, it was reported that Austin Amelio would join the cast as Dwight, who last appeared in the eighth season of The Walking Dead. Alexa Nisenson was promoted to the main cast after recurring in the fourth season as Charlie. In March 2019, it was reported that Karen David had been added to the main cast as Grace.

=== Filming ===
Filming for the fifth season began in December 2018 in New Braunfels, Texas. It was reported that Sarah Wayne Callies, who played Lori Grimes on its companion series The Walking Dead, would direct an episode of the season, however, she was not able to due to scheduling conflicts.

== Reception ==
=== Critical response ===
The fifth season received mixed reviews from critics and generally negative reviews from audiences. On Rotten Tomatoes, the season has a rating of 55% based on 211 reviews, with an average rating of 5.1/10. The site's critical consensus reads, "Despite delivering some memorable and splatter-filled zombie set-pieces that fans crave, Fear the Walking Dead feels stiff with early-onset rigor mortis in a fifth season that emphasizes altruism over coherent characterization."

The premiere episode "Here to Help" received mostly positive reviews from critics, in contrast to other episodes in the season. On Rotten Tomatoes, "Here to Help" garnered a 92% rating, with an average score of 8.25/10 based on 13 reviews. The sites critical consensus reads; "Fear's band of survivors discover that good intentions pave a road to hell in a rousing season premiere that further stakes out the series' unique identity while adding connective, bloody tissue to the broader Walking Dead mythos."

Fear the Walking Dead season 5: Critical reception by episode
Season 5 (2019): Percentage of positive critics' reviews tracked by the website Rotten Tomatoes

=== Fan response ===
Following the airing of the season's penultimate episode, a Change.org petition had attracted media attention. Drawing comparisons to a petition to rewrite the last season of Game of Thrones a few months prior, the petition was to fire current showrunners Ian Goldberg and Andrew Chambliss. Chambliss responded to the negative fan reaction by saying, "You know, we told the story that we believe in and we're proud of what we did and in terms of going forward, the show is changing and that's always been part of the plan. You know, it changes every season and every half season and we're very excited about the direction it's going and a lot of the tough challenges that our characters ahead are going to be facing."

=== Ratings ===
Viewership and ratings per episode of Fear the Walking Dead season 5
No.	Title	Air date	Rating (18–49)	Viewers (millions)	DVR (18–49)	DVR viewers (millions)	Total (18–49)	Total viewers (millions)
1	"Here to Help"	June 2, 2019	0.6	1.97	0.4	1.24	1.0	3.21
2	"The Hurt That Will Happen"	June 9, 2019	0.5	1.69	0.4	1.13	0.9	2.82
3	"Humbug's Gulch"	June 16, 2019	0.5	1.76	0.4	1.11	0.9	2.87
4	"Skidmark"	June 23, 2019	0.5	1.66	0.4	1.23	0.9	2.89
5	"The End of Everything"	June 30, 2019	0.5	1.71	0.3	1.07	0.8	2.78
6	"The Little Prince"	July 7, 2019	0.4	1.49	0.4	1.13	0.8	2.62
7	"Still Standing"	July 14, 2019	0.3	1.39	0.4	1.07	0.7	2.47
8	"Is Anybody Out There?"	July 21, 2019	0.5	1.60	0.3	1.04	0.8	2.64
9	"Channel 4"	August 11, 2019	0.4	1.40	0.3	1.06	0.7	2.46
10	"210 Words Per Minute"	August 18, 2019	0.4	1.37	0.4	1.14	0.8	2.51
11	"You're Still Here"	August 25, 2019	0.4	1.44	0.2	0.74	0.6	2.17 (Note: Live +7 ratings were not available, so Live +3 ratings have been used instead.)
12	"Ner Tamid"	September 1, 2019	0.3	1.14	0.3	0.96	0.6	2.10
13	"Leave What You Don't"	September 8, 2019	0.4	1.45	0.3	0.75	0.7	2.19
14	"Today and Tomorrow"	September 15, 2019	0.3	1.31	0.3	0.82	0.6	2.13
15	"Channel 5"	September 22, 2019	0.4	1.34	0.3	0.78	0.6	2.12
16	"End of the Line"	September 29, 2019	0.4	1.51	0.4	1.19	0.8	2.70 (Note: Live +7 ratings were not available, so Live +35 ratings have been used instead)
