= 210 Words Per Minute =

- Fear the Walking Dead episode
- Episode no.: Season 5 Episode 10
- Directed by: Ron Underwood
- Written by: Andrew Chambliss; Ian Goldberg
- Original air date: August 18, 2019
- Running time: 49 minutes

Episode chronology
← Previous "Channel 4"	Next → "You're Still Here"
- Fear the Walking Dead (season 5)

"210 Words Per Minute" is the tenth episode of the fifth season of the post-apocalyptic horror television series Fear the Walking Dead, which aired on AMC on August 18, 2019. The episode was written by Andrew Chambliss and Ian Goldberg and directed by Ron Underwood.

== Plot ==
Morgan, Dwight, and Grace receive a call from Chuck, a man who works at a nearby mall. Chuck was bitten by a walker and wants them to kill him before he turns. At the mall, Grace begins to feel ill from the effects of radiation sickness and passes out. Dwight leaves to get medical supplies and vows to return with the caravan the next morning.

Alone at the mall, Morgan and Grace share details about their past lives and they are both attracted to one another. They find an Urgent Care center, but when they try to enter, a security alarm goes off, attracting walkers.

When Dwight returns with the caravan, he is kidnapped by Rollie, a member of Logan's crew. Rollie taunts Dwight over Sherry, but Dwight quickly takes the lead. Instead of killing him, Dwight decides to free Rollie, but orders him to leave the area and never return. After fighting the walkers, Morgan and Grace find Chuck on the roof, where he dies in peace. Grace decides not to use the urgent care center because she doesn't want to worry about how long she has left. The next morning, Morgan and Grace bury Chuck when the caravan arrives. Morgan decides to help Althea on a separate supply run, leaving Grace behind without admitting his true feelings for her.

== Reception ==
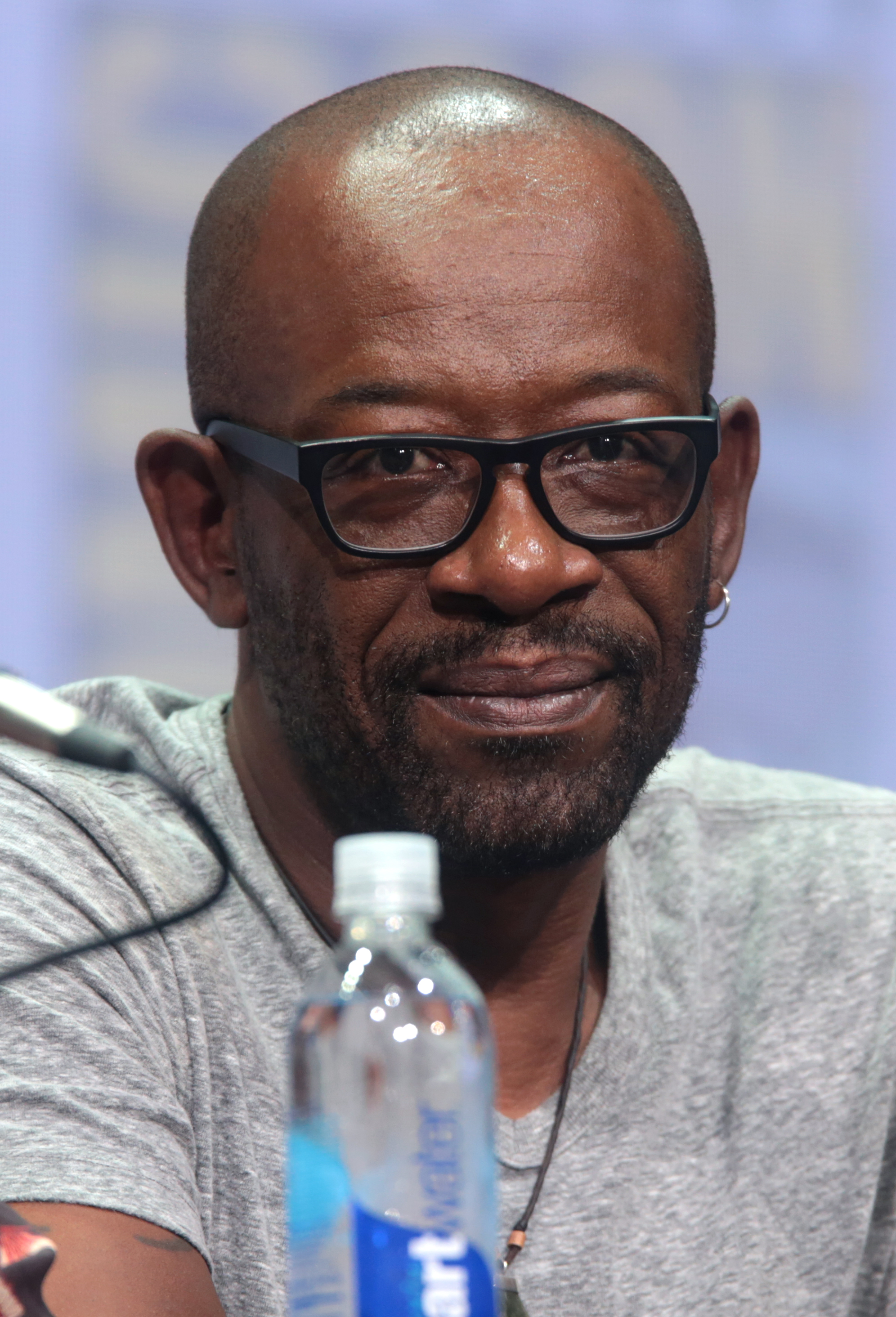
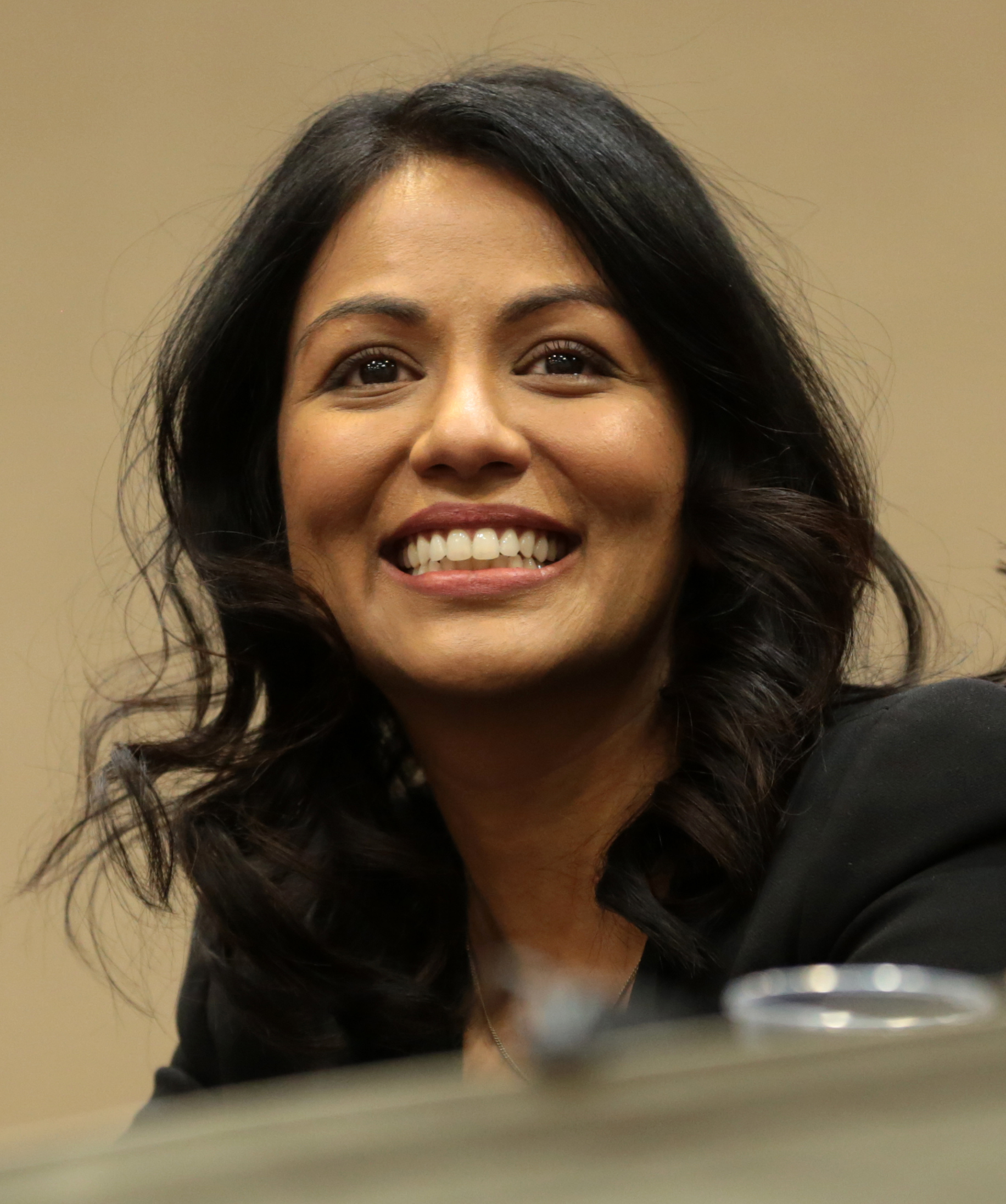
Lennie James (Morgan Jones) (left) and Karen David (Grace) (right) were praised by critics for their scenes together.

"210 Words Per Minute" received mixed reviews. It currently holds a 50% positive rating with an average score of 6.67/10 out of 12 on the review aggregator Rotten Tomatoes. The critics' consensus reads: "'210 Words Per Minute' refreshingly introduces romance to Lennie James' Morgan, but lethargic pacing and confused character motivations rots this installment's better qualities."

Liam Mathews of TV Guide praised the performance of Lennie James and wrote: "The tearful final scene between Morgan and Grace was well played. Lennie James is one of the best actors on either show in the franchise, and when he's given good material, he nails it." Nick Romano of Entertainment Weekly was negative about the episode and wrote: "The merry-go-round at the finish of '210 Words Per Minute' is the physical manifestation of what Fear the Walking Dead has become: a tedious round-about that never ends and always circles back to where it began."

=== Rating ===
The episode was seen by 1.37 million viewers in the United States on its original air date, below the previous episodes.
