= You're Still Here (Fear the Walking Dead) =

- Fear the Walking Dead episode
- Episode no.: Season 5 Episode 11
- Directed by: K.C. Colwell
- Written by: Mallory Westfall; Alex Delyle
- Original air date: August 25, 2019
- Running time: 45 minutes

Guest appearances
- Matt Frewer as Logan; Colby Hollman as Wes

Episode chronology
← Previous "210 Words Per Minute"	Next → "Ner Tamid"
- Fear the Walking Dead (season 5)

"You're Still Here" is the eleventh episode of the fifth season of the post-apocalyptic horror television series Fear the Walking Dead, which aired on AMC on August 25, 2019. The episode was written by Mallory Westfall and Alex Delyle, and directed by K.C. Colwell.

== Plot ==
During a scouting trip with Strand, Alicia finds another tree painted with the message "If you're reading this, you're still here." Wes contacts them, and explains his personal encounter with Logan. Alicia and Strand take Wes to his abode, which is a nearby police station. When Wes walks in, a gun battle is heard and an injured man runs out and steals their truck.

Elsewhere, Morgan and Althea enter a bank, where Althea keeps her interview tapes in a safe deposit box. They pick up a distress call from Alicia and attempt to locate the injured man and the stolen truck, but their progress is stopped by Logan's crew. Alicia, Strand and Wes escape from the police station and locate the wounded man. He tries to strangle Wes, but Wes overpowers him and stabs him before asking where a manuscript is.

The man tells Wes that it is in his bag before he dies. Alicia angrily wonders why Wes would kill someone for a manuscript; Wes just says "people are people" before walking away. While looking at the manuscript, Alicia discovers the phrase of the trees on the final page and realizes that Wes was the one who painted them. That night, Logan's crew invade the bank and steal Althea's tapes, hoping to learn the whereabouts of the oil field location.

== Reception ==
"You're Still Here" received negative reviews. It currently holds a 46% negative rating with an average score of 5.62/10 out of 13 on the review aggregator Rotten Tomatoes. The critics' consensus reads: "Guest star Colby Hollman makes a strong impression as the cynical Wes in 'You're Still Here,' a leisurely paced installment that nevertheless may have fans wondering if the series has forgotten where the meat of its appeal lies."

David S.E. Zapanta of Den of Geek praised the episode and wrote: ""You're Still Here" marks a welcome return to form for the series. And by that I mean a renewed, fresh focus on the undead, positioning them more as scavengers, feasting on dead livestock while the living roll past seemingly unnoticed and unhindered." However, Erik Kain of Forbes was negative about the episode and wrote: "Another weird episode. Logan is just baffling. Strand is no longer anything remotely like he used to be and Alicia is almost incoherent as a character at this point."

=== Rating ===
The episode was seen by 1.44 million viewers in the United States on its original air date, more than the previous episodes.
