= Is Anybody Out There? (Fear the Walking Dead) =

- Fear the Walking Dead episode
- Episode no.: Season 5 Episode 8
- Directed by: Michael E. Satrazemis
- Written by: Michael Alaimo
- Original air date: July 21, 2019
- Running time: 44 minutes

Guest appearances
- Matt Frewer as Logan; Daryl Mitchell as Wendell Rabinowitz; Mo Collins as Sarah Rabinowitz; Cooper Dodson as Dylan; Bailey Gavulic as Annie; Ethan Suess as Max

Episode chronology
← Previous "Still Standing"	Next → "Channel 4"
- Fear the Walking Dead (season 5)

"Anybody Out There?" is the eighth episode and mid-season finale of the fifth season of the post-apocalyptic horror television series Fear the Walking Dead, which aired on AMC on July 21, 2019. The episode was written by Michael Alaimo and directed by Michael E. Satrazemis.

== Plot ==
The power plant melts and the containment building explodes, spreading a cloud of radioactive dust in the air that threatens everyone's life.

Cut off from the rest of the group, John and Dwight struggle to find their way back but are helped by another message from Sherry that leads them to a working vehicle. John then proposes to June, who accepts.

Grace decontaminates Alicia but is not sure how much radiation she absorbed or the future effects on her health. Morgan, Grace, and Alicia are chased by a walking horde, they return to the plane in time to escape. With the help of Daniel, Sarah and Wendell can create a catwalk with Christmas lights. Despite a mishap with some walkers, the plane lands successfully and Daniel and Alicia meet again after a long time. At the same time, Logan's team ruins the denim factory in search of something to no avail, leading them to abandon Logan.

Later, Morgan's group receives a call for help but is interrupted by Logan, who seeks his help in finding an oil field that Clayton had established to deal with the problem of spoiling fuel. Seemingly sorry for his past actions, Logan says they must find the field before his old team does, as it is his only chance to reach the people who need his help.

== Reception ==
"Is Anybody Out There?" received mixed reviews. It currently holds a 54% positive rating with an average score of 6.62/10 out of 13 on the review aggregator Rotten Tomatoes. The critics' consensus reads: "'Is Anybody Out There' proves to be a lukewarm midseason finale, underscoring the series' deflating stakes and tension, although viewers may be pleased by the promise of renewed focus and a change in scenery going forward."

Liam Mathews of TV Guide praised the episode and wrote: "The Walking Dead shows are at their best when they're exploring the gray areas of what people have to do to survive with morally ambiguous characters on both sides of the conflict. Fear the Walking Dead isn't that anymore." Writing for Forbes, Erik Kain gave it a negative review and wrote: "Fear The Walking Dead is a pale shadow of its former self, almost a new show entirely, and barely worth watching."

=== Rating ===
The episode was seen by 1.60 million viewers in the United States on its original air date, above the previous episodes.
