= The Hurt That Will Happen =

- Fear the Walking Dead episode
- Episode no.: Season 5 Episode 2
- Directed by: Jessica Lowrey
- Written by: Alex Delyle
- Original air date: June 9, 2019
- Running time: 41 minutes

Episode chronology
← Previous "Here to Help"	Next → "Humbug's Gulch"
- Fear the Walking Dead (season 5)

"The Hurt That Will Happen" is the second episode of the fifth season of the post-apocalyptic horror television series Fear the Walking Dead, which aired on AMC on June 9, 2019, in the United States. The episode was written by Alex Delyle, and directed by Jessica Lowrey.

== Plot ==
After encountering another high warning radiation obstacle while searching for the missing Al, Morgan encounters a woman named Grace while sending two walkers into a trap. Grace explains that due to a power plant collapse the previous year, there are over sixty radioactive walkers in the area.

Simply getting close to walkers risks the survivors becoming contaminated, causing Morgan to permanently lose his contaminated battle staff. As a former operations manager for the plant, Grace blames herself for the deaths of her friends and is on a mission to find and eliminate the radioactive walkers, herself terminally ill with radiation sickness.

John and June locate the camp that Max and his siblings possibly came from only to discover that the residents succumbed to radiation sickness after battling a pack of radioactive walkers. Grace goes out on her own to hunt down the rest, promising to keep in touch. At the same time, Víctor locates Daniel Salazar who helps him make contact with Luciana. Although convinced of the problem, Daniel refuses to lend his plane to Victor, who believes that it will only make things worse based on his past experiences.

After fainting after being attacked by a walker, Luciana wakes up to find that someone has cut off the heads of her walkers and hung them from a billboard at the truck stop.

== Reception ==
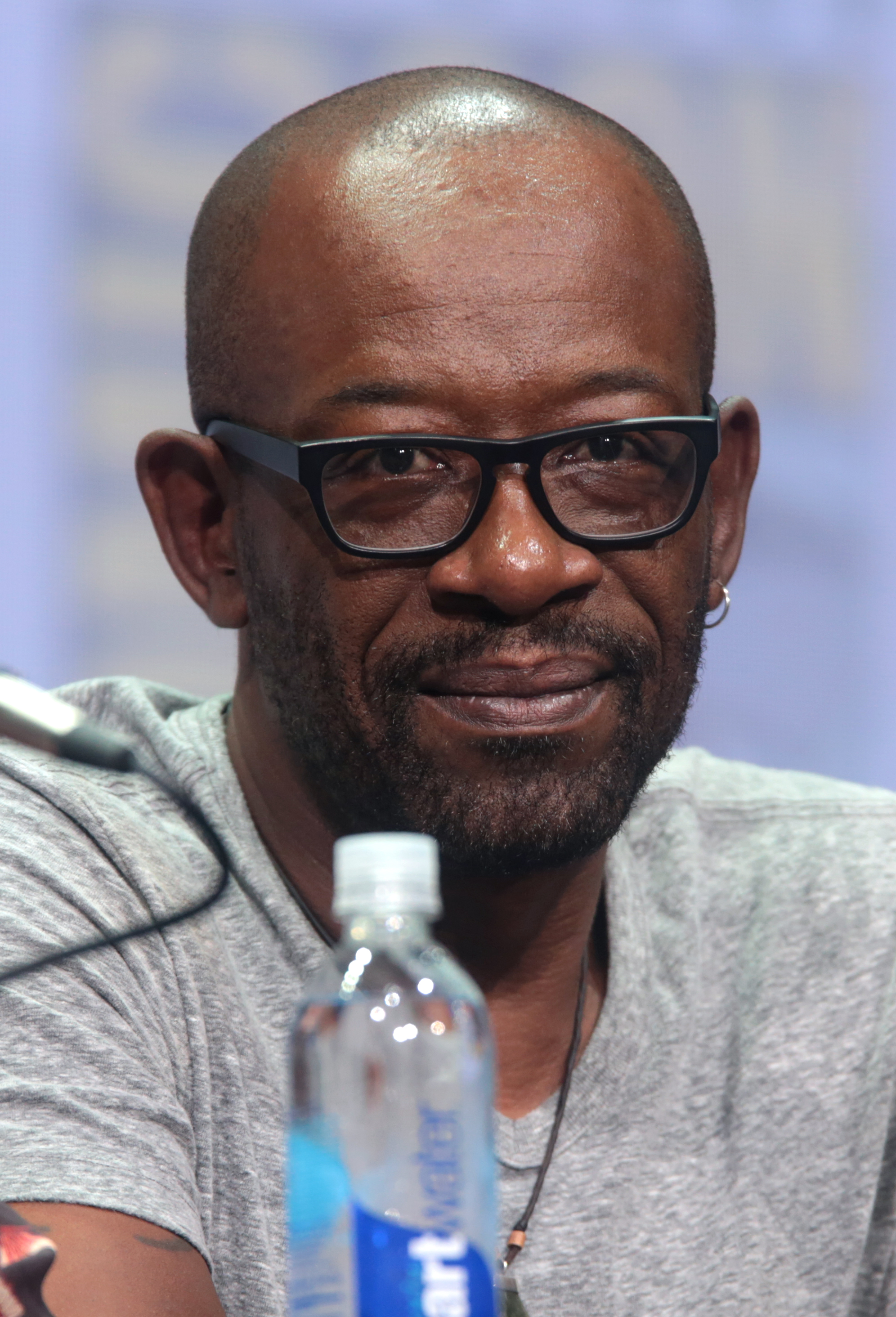
Lennie James, who plays Morgan Jones, received positive reviews for his performance.

"The Hurt That Will Happen" received mixed reviews from critics. On Rotten Tomatoes, the episode garnered a 62% rating, with an average score of 7.38/10 based on 13 reviews. The sites critical consensus reads; "'The Hurt That Will Happen' introduces a promising new innovation to The Walking Dead lore—radioactive zombies! -- but this instalment's pacing is as lethargic as a walker."

Writing for Tell-Tale TV, Nick Hogan gave it a rating of 2.5/5 and said: "Ultimately, the Strand–Daniel scenes and the other, expository scenes are two sides of the same coin. Fear the Walking Dead is a much better show when digging in with characters it has developed, rather than trying overdo the plot."

C.H. Newell who writes for Father Son Holy Gore praised the episode and said: "A great episode. Love to see the radiation in there, making the zombies even nastier than usual. It's a great little twist." Alexander Zalben from Decider praised the development of Morgan Jones (played by Lennie James) during the episode and wrote: "[Morgan]'s told to take off his clothing... Including his wedding ring. That's the point of the scene, by the way, to show how much Morgan has grown".

=== Ratings ===
The episode was seen by 1.69 million viewers in the United States on its original air date, far below the previous episodes.
