= Fear the Walking Dead season 7 =

Fear the Walking Dead
- Season 7
- Promotional poster
- Showrunners: Andrew Chambliss; Ian Goldberg
- Starring: Lennie James; Alycia Debnam-Carey; Colman Domingo; Danay García; Austin Amelio; Mo Collins; Alexa Nisenson; Karen David; Christine Evangelista; Colby Hollman; Jenna Elfman; Keith Carradine; Rubén Blades
- No. of episodes: 16

Release
- Original network: AMC
- Original release: October 17, 2021 – June 5, 2022

Season chronology
- ← Previous; Season 6 Next → Season 8

The seventh season of Fear the Walking Dead, an American horror-drama television series on AMC, premiered on October 17, 2021, and concluded on June 5, 2022, consisting of sixteen episodes. The series is a companion series to The Walking Dead, which is based on the comic book series of the same name by Robert Kirkman, Tony Moore, and Charlie Adlard. The executive producers are Kirkman, David Alpert, Greg Nicotero, Gale Anne Hurd, Scott M. Gimple, Andrew Chambliss, and Ian B. Goldberg, with Chambliss and Goldberg as showrunners for the fourth consecutive season.

The season follows Morgan's group scattered across the landscape of Texas as they try to survive the nuclear fallout brought about by Teddy (John Glover) and his followers. Meanwhile, Morgan Jones (Lennie James) and Victor Strand (Colman Domingo) clash over their philosophies.

== Cast ==
The seventh season featured thirteen actors receiving main cast billing status, with all of them returning from the sixth season. This was the first season not to include Garret Dillahunt and Zoe Colletti, who were both credited as main cast members in previous seasons. Maggie Grace appears in a guest role where as she was a main cast member in previous seasons.

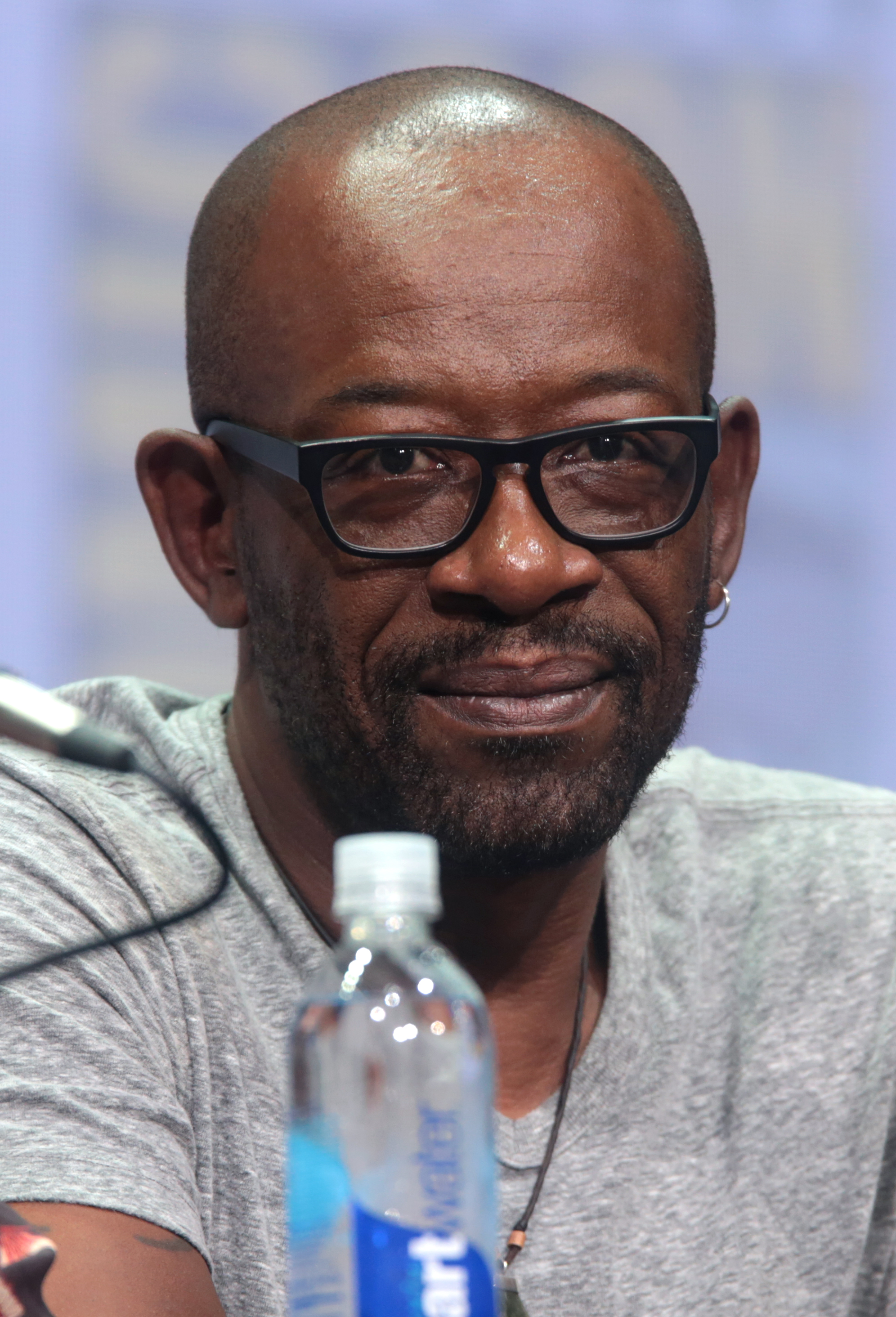
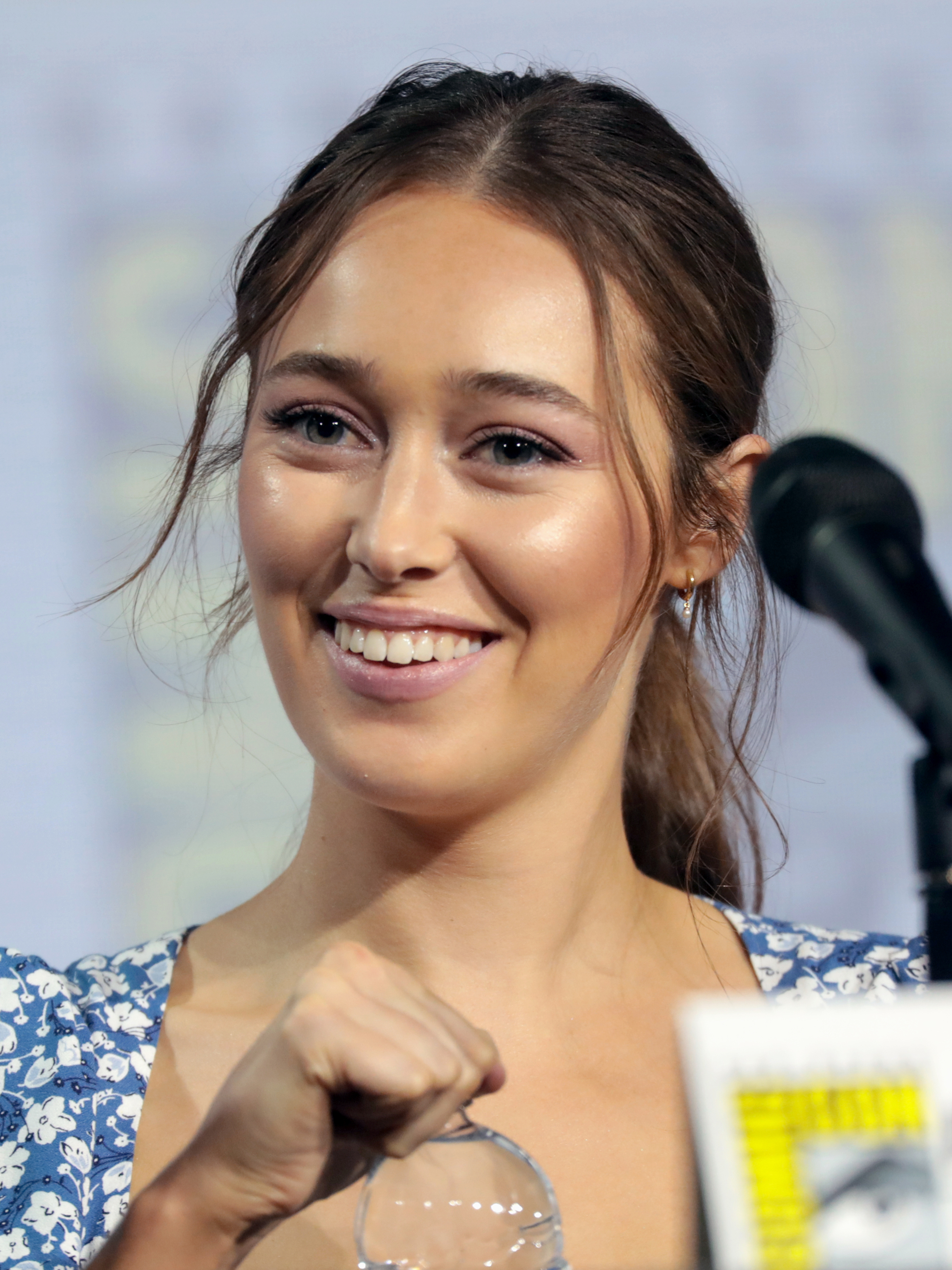
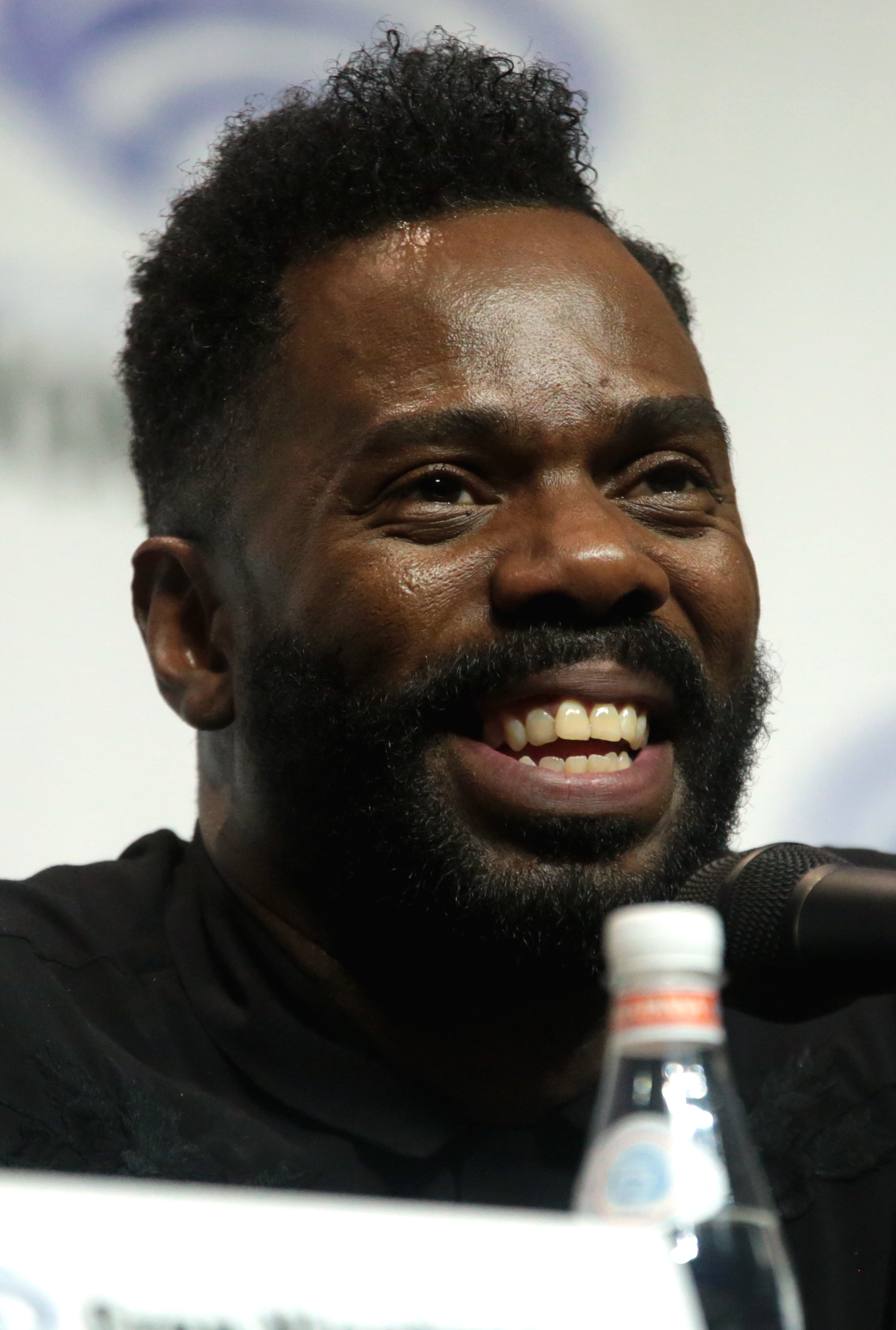
Lennie James (Morgan Jones), Alycia Debnam-Carey (Alicia Clark), and Colman Domingo (Victor Strand)
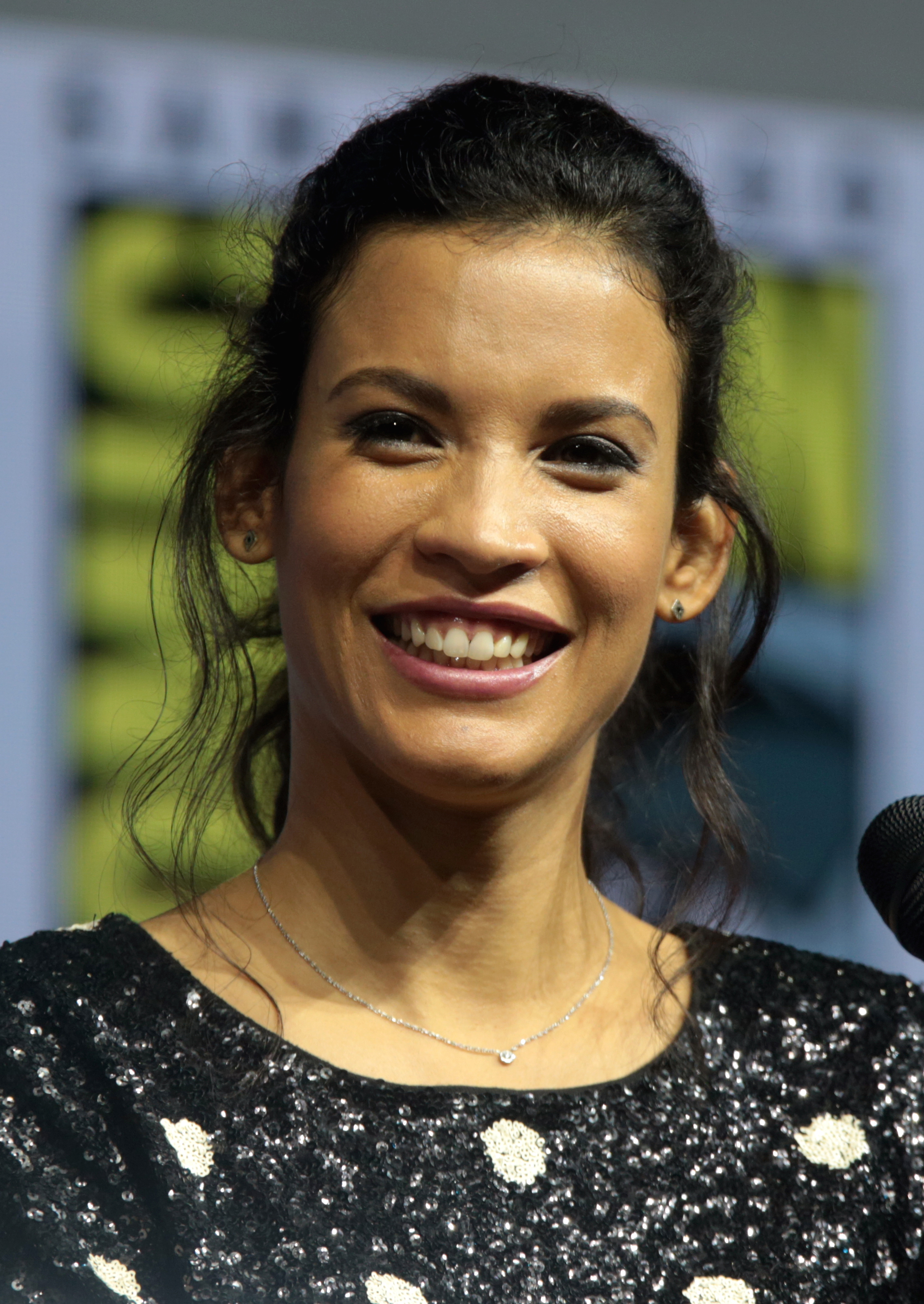
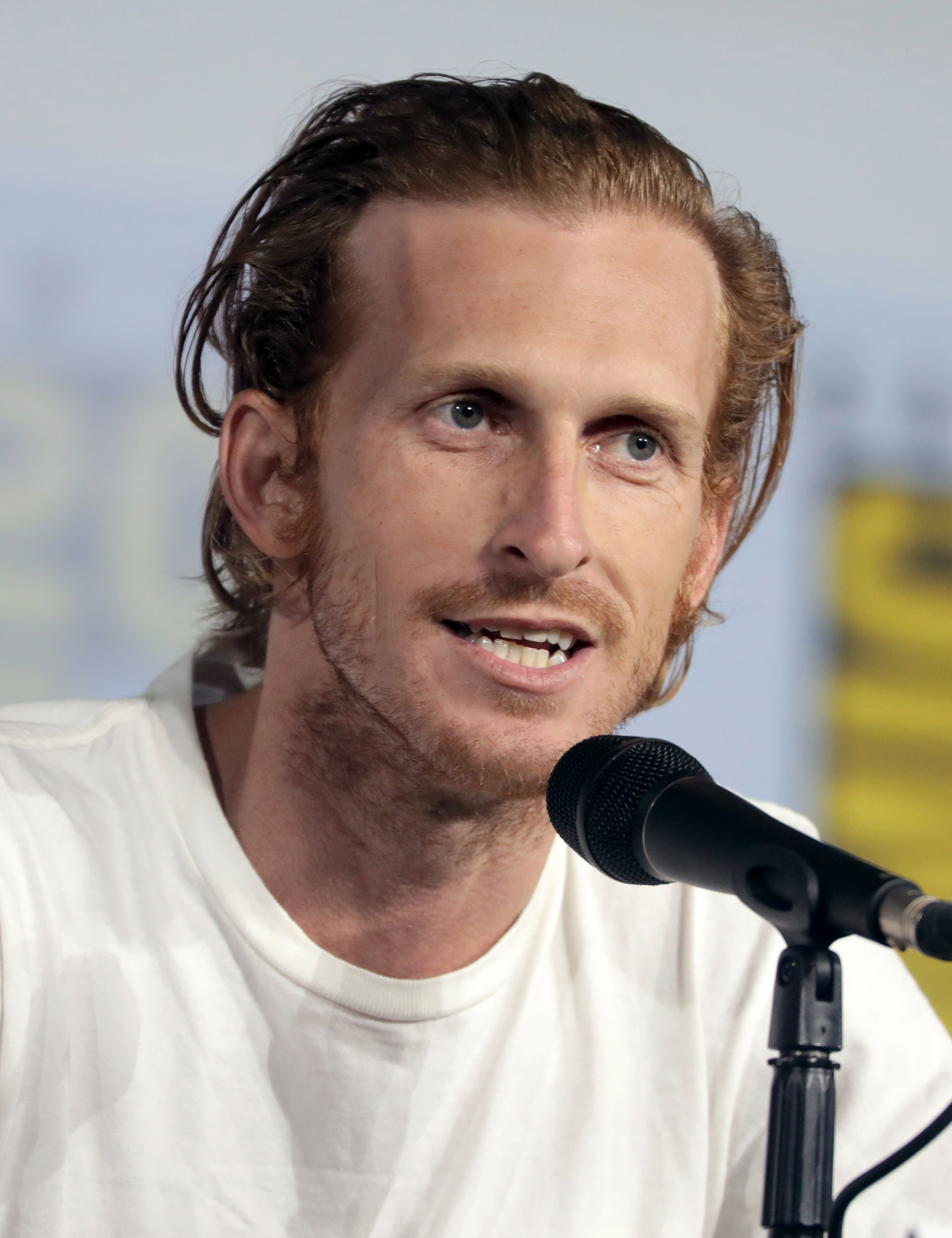
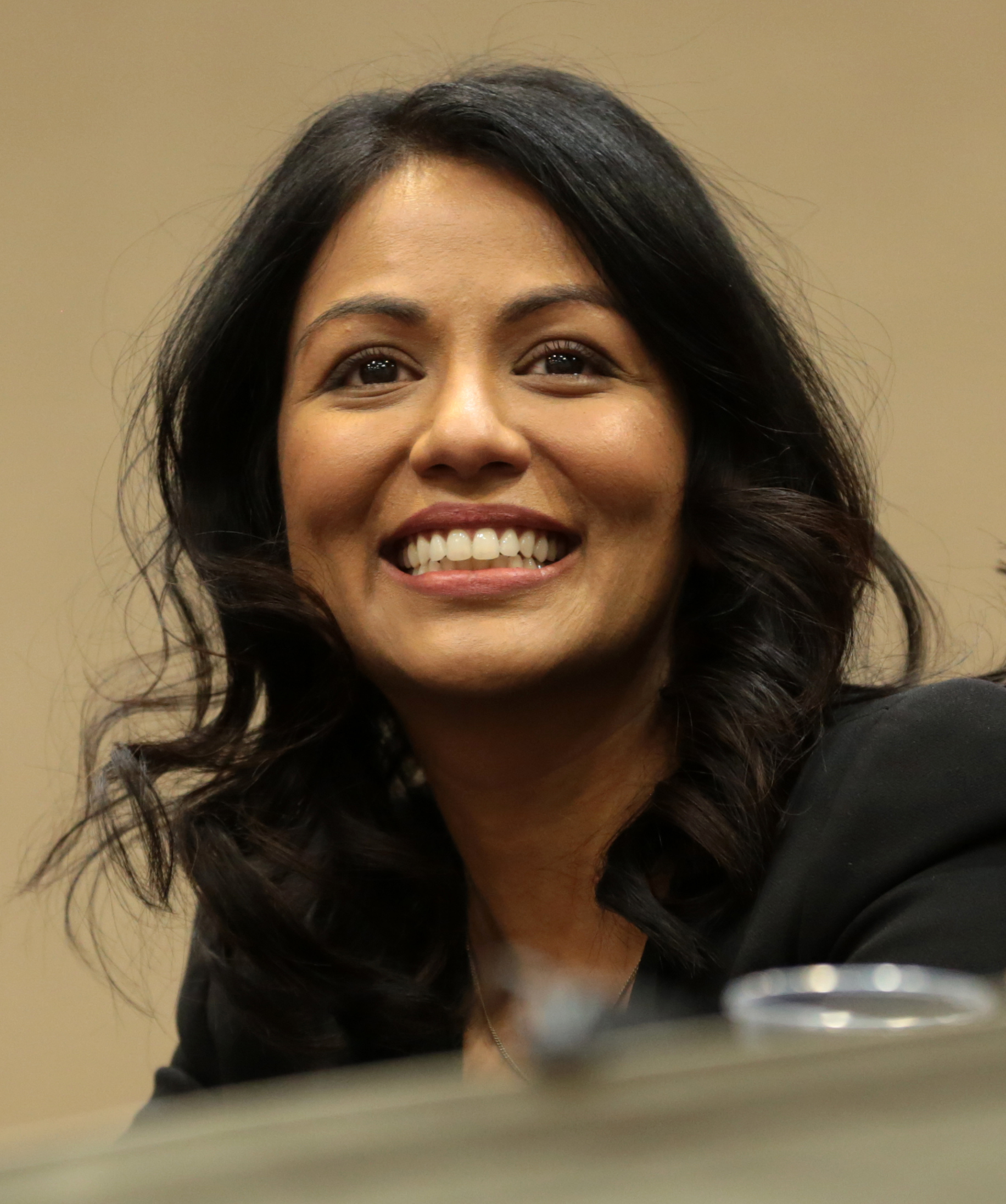
Danay García (Luciana Galvez), Austin Amelio (Dwight), and Karen David (Grace Mukherjee)
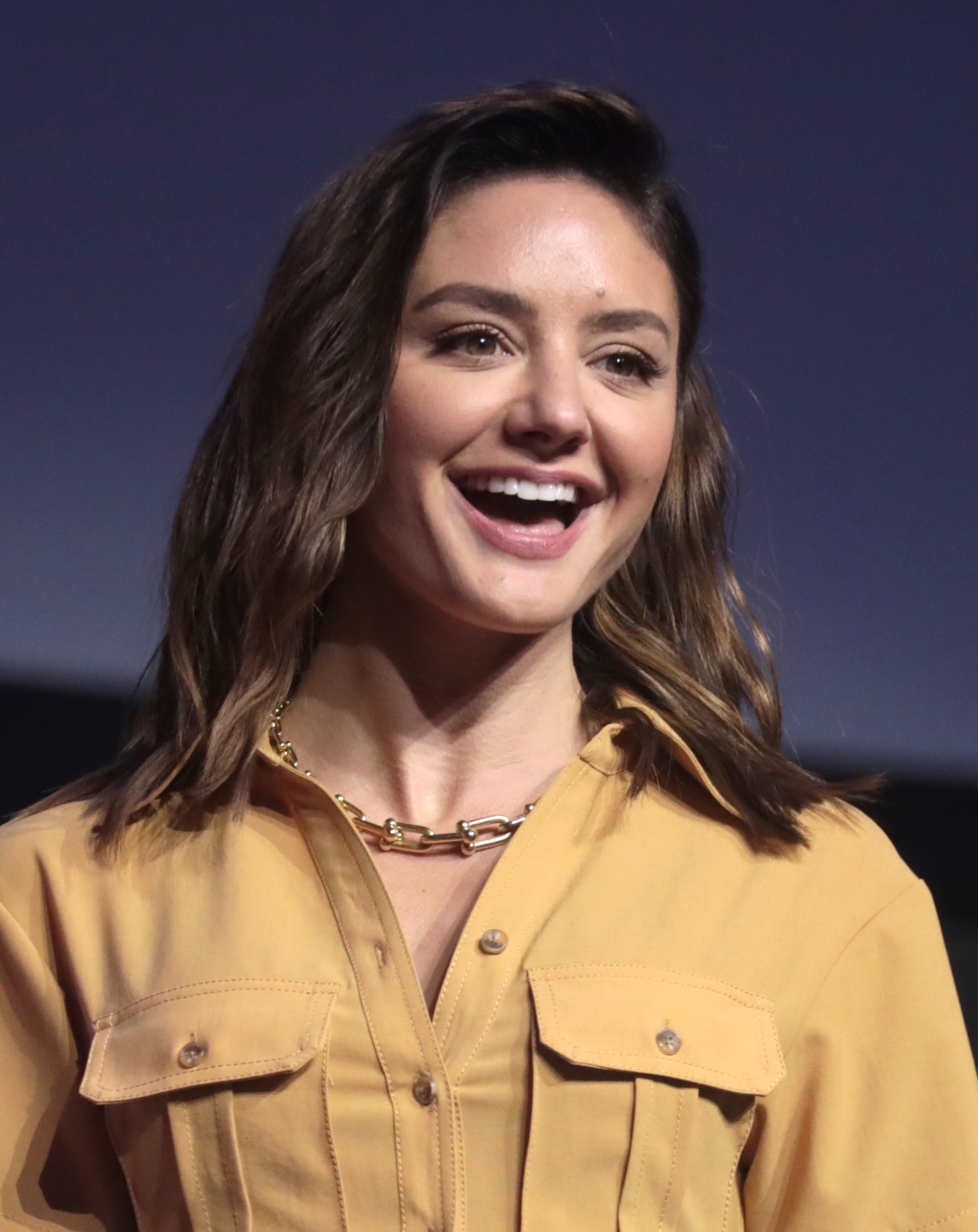
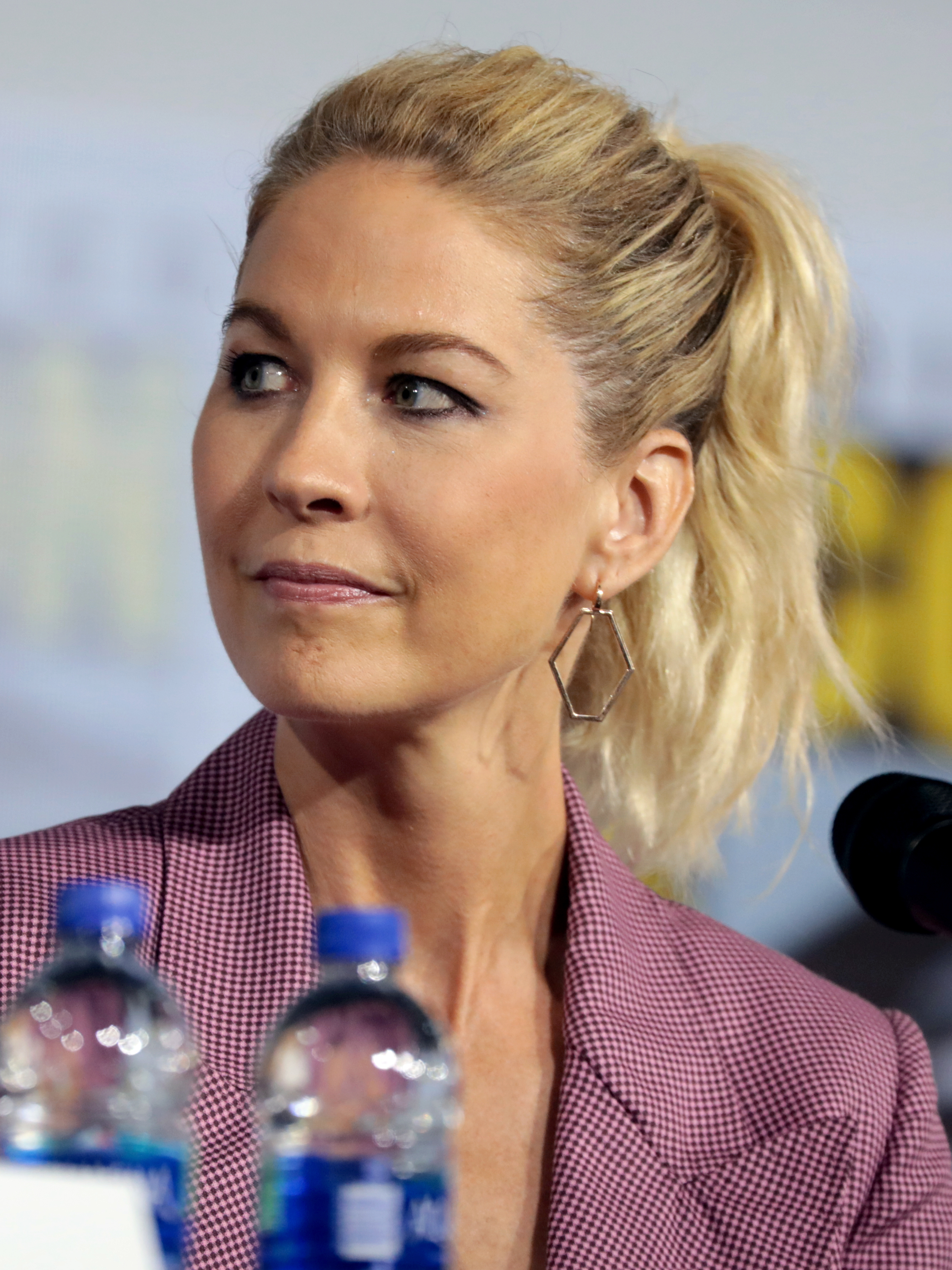
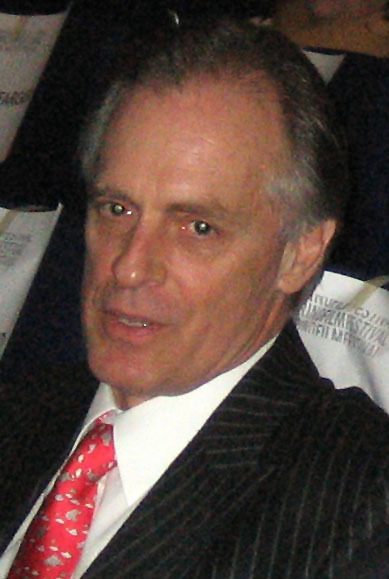
Christine Evangelista (Sherry), Jenna Elfman (June Dorie), and Keith Carradine (John Dorie Sr.)
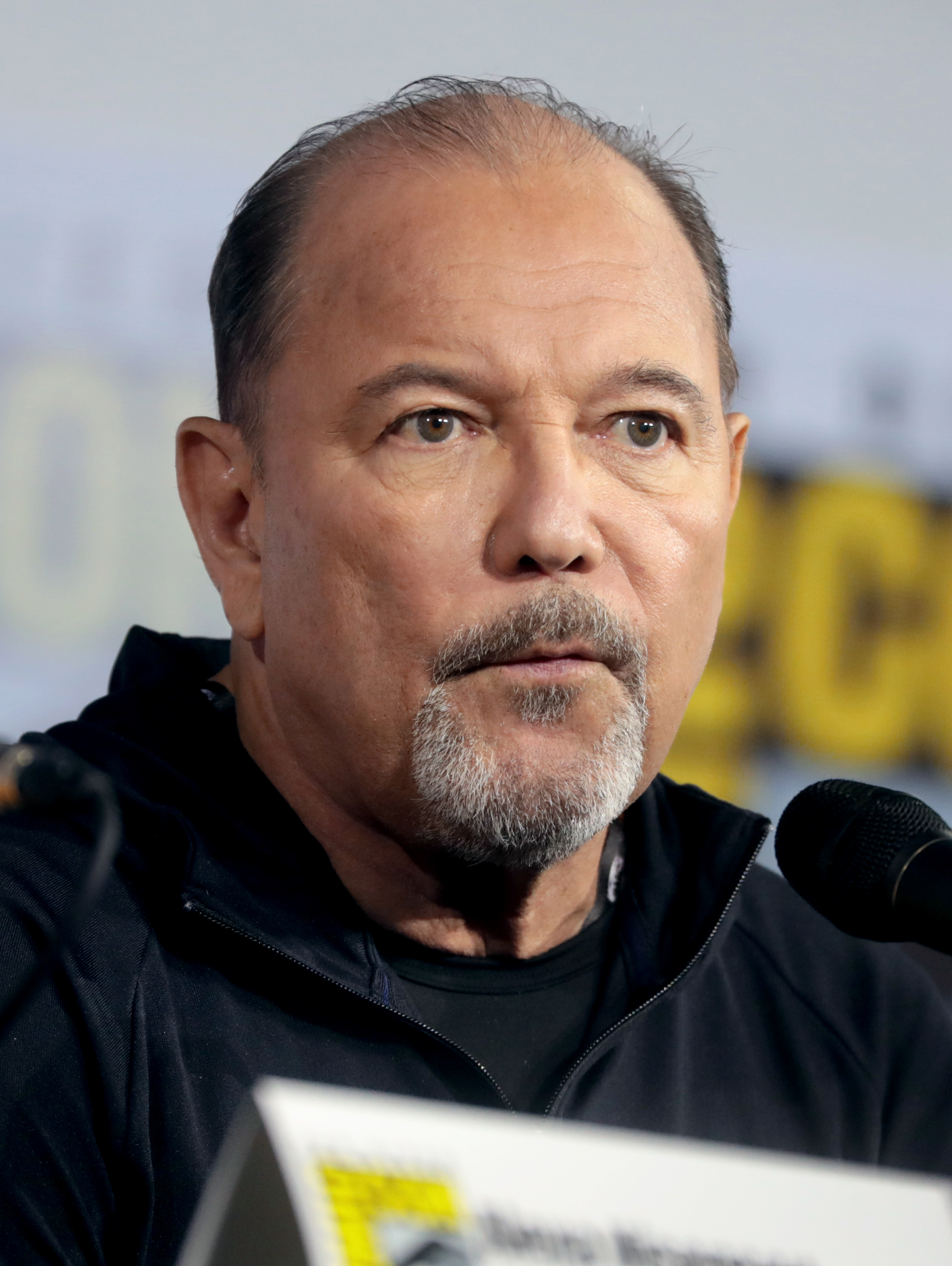
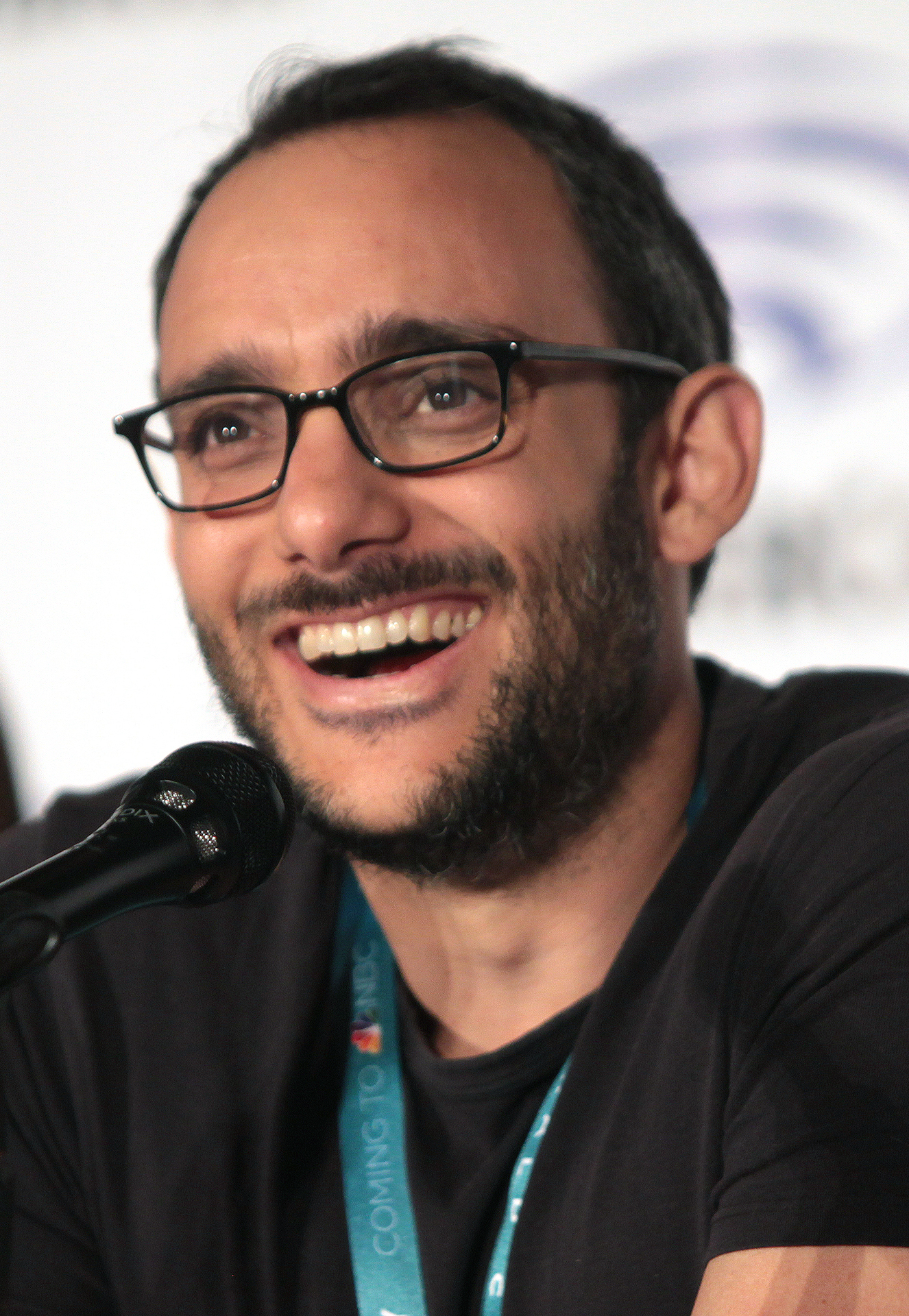
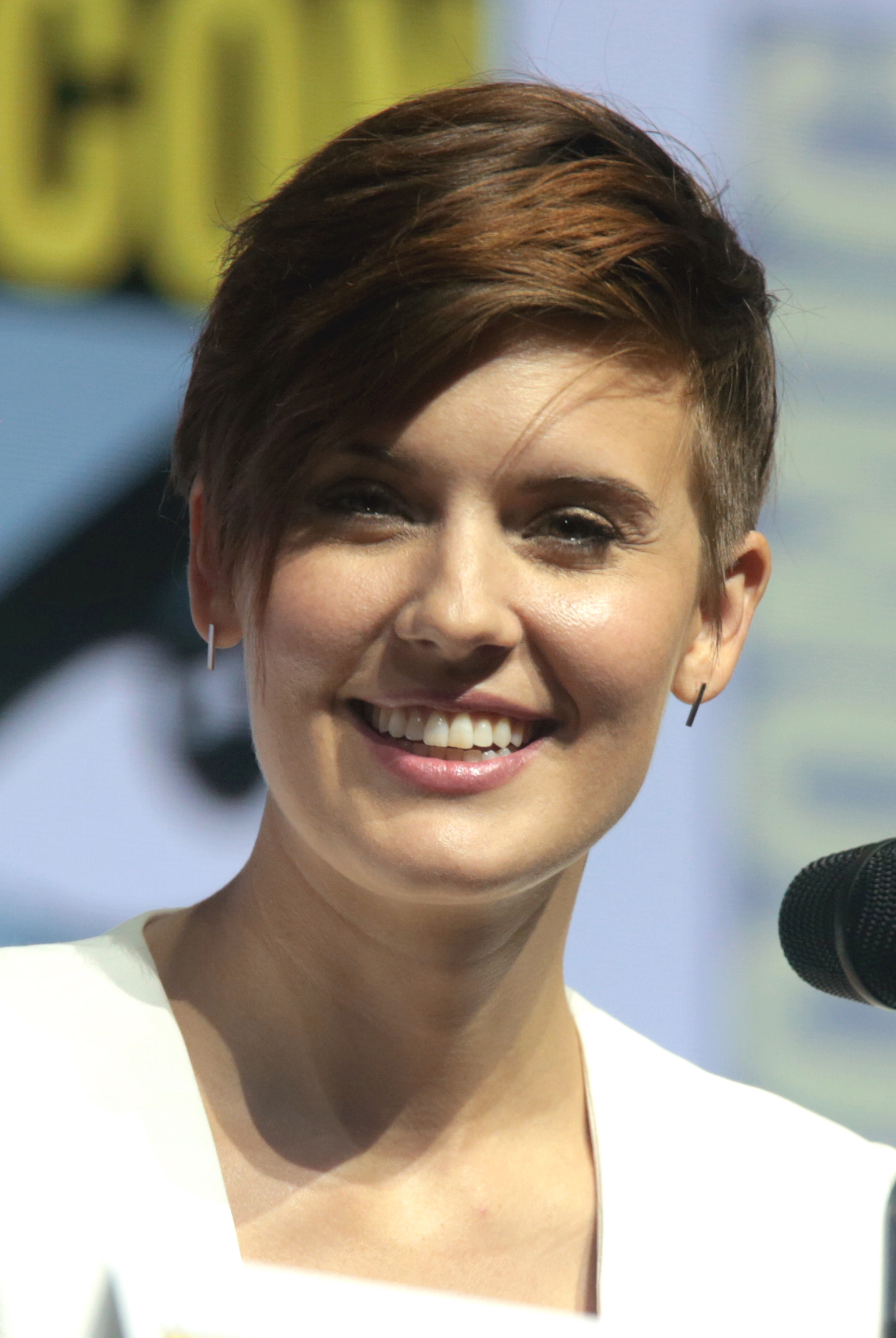
Rubén Blades (Daniel Salazar), Omid Abtahi (Howard), and Maggie Grace (Althea Szewczyk-Przygocki)

=== Main cast ===
- Lennie James as Morgan Jones: A pragmatic man, formerly a part of Rick Grimes' group on The Walking Dead. He is currently in a relationship with Grace and the adoptive father of Isaac and Rachel's daughter, Morgan.
- Alycia Debnam-Carey as Alicia Clark: The fiery yet compassionate daughter of Madison. She is currently the leader of a group of survivors living underneath the Franklin Hotel's bunker, where she was imprisoned by Teddy in the previous season.
- Colman Domingo as Victor Strand: A smart and sophisticated conman-turned-businessman, who formed friendships with Madison and Alicia. He is currently the totalitarian leader of a new thriving safe-zone, the Tower, and the season's primary antagonist.
- Danay García as Luciana Galvez: A strong and cautious former member of the La Colonia community in Tijuana, Mexico. She was among the survivors whom Althea and Isabelle saved from the nuclear blast.
- Austin Amelio as Dwight: A reformed former lieutenant of the Saviors, who was exiled from Virginia by Rick Grimes' group on The Walking Dead. He eventually reunited with his wife Sherry and is now a member of the ethical outlaws known as the Dark Horses.
- Mo Collins as Sarah Rabinowitz: The adoptive sister of Wendell and a former Marine. She was among the survivors whom Althea and Isabelle saved from the nuclear blast.
- Alexa Nisenson as Charlie: A young girl who was a spy for the Vultures. She was among the survivors whom Althea and Isabelle saved from the nuclear blast.
- Karen David as Grace Mukherjee: A woman who used to work at a nuclear power plant that melted down near the site where the plane of Morgan's group crashed. She is currently in a relationship with Morgan Jones and the adoptive mother of Isaac and Rachel's daughter, Morgan.
- Christine Evangelista as Sherry: Dwight's wife who fled across the country to Texas after escaping the Saviors. She eventually reunited with her husband and is now also a member of the ethical outlaws known as the Dark Horses.
- Colby Hollman as Wes: A nihilistic painter who allies with Morgan's group. He was among the survivors whom Althea and Isabelle saved from the nuclear blast.
- Jenna Elfman as June Dorie: A kind nurse who was married to John. She is currently hiding from the nuclear blast and living in Teddy's bunker along with her father-in-law, John Dorie Sr.
- Keith Carradine as John Dorie Sr.: John's father who was also a police officer before the apocalypse. He is currently hiding from the nuclear blast and living in Teddy's bunker along with his daughter-in-law, June.
- Rubén Blades as Daniel Salazar: A courageous and ruthlessly pragmatic former Sombra Negra member who formed a parental bond with Charlie. He was among the survivors whom Althea and Isabelle saved from the nuclear blast.

=== Supporting cast ===
- Omid Abtahi as Howard: A former history teacher who Strand met when he was hiding from the nuclear blast. He is currently Strand's right-hand man and the deputy leader of a new thriving community, the Tower.
- Demetrius Grosse as Josiah LaRoux: Emile's twin brother who is seeking revenge upon Morgan Jones for killing his brother in the previous season.
- Daryl Mitchell as Wendell: The adoptive brother of Sarah who uses a wheelchair.
- Spenser Granese as Arnold: The leader of the Stalkers who was a former member of Teddy's doomsday cult.

=== Guest cast ===
- Gus Halper as Will: The former aide of a democratic senator who lived underneath the Franklin Hotel's bunker where he met Alicia.
- Derek Richardson as Fred: A delusional survivor who is suffering from radiation sickness.
- Maren Lord as Bea: Fred's wife who is also suffering from radiation sickness.
- Maggie Grace as Althea "Al" Szewczyk-Przygocki: A curious and tactical journalist who saved most of the members of Morgan's group from the nuclear blast with the help of her lover, Isabelle.
- Aisha Tyler as Mickey: A former professional wrestler who joins forces with the Dark Horses after the death of her husband, Cliff.
- Alex Skuby as Eli: A sadistic survivor hired by Strand.
- Sydney Lemmon as Isabelle: A former CRM pilot who Al befriended and who later rescued several of Morgan's friends from the coming nuclear destruction.
- Warren Snipe as Paul: A deaf musician who encounters Alicia.
- Ashton Arbab as Ali: A teenager and trainee guard at the Tower.
- Peter Jacobson as Jacob Kessner: A rabbi and a member of Morgan's group.
- Kim Dickens as Madison Clark: A cunning and domineering high school guidance counselor, and mother of Nick and Alicia. She was presumed to be dead in the fourth season.
- Lyndon Smith as Ava Sanderson: A hardened survivor from Louisiana whose daughter got kidnapped by a mysterious organization.

== Episodes ==
No. overall	No. in season	Title	Directed by	Written by	Original release date	U.S. viewers (millions)
86	1	"The Beacon"	Michael E. Satrazemis	Ian Goldberg & Andrew Chambliss	October 17, 2021	1.09
After the nuclear blast in Texas, Will, a young survivor, navigates the devastated lands while evading a mysterious group called the Stalkers, who strip the dead of their clothes. Will is eventually captured by Victor Strand's Rangers and taken to the Tower, a settlement that Strand established in the office building where he survived the nuclear blasts. Strand lives a luxurious lifestyle and only takes in survivors he feels will be of use to him. Threatened with being kicked out, Will reveals that he has the medallion that Strand had given to Alicia and agrees to lead Strand to her. Will reveals he was part of a group that had been slaughtered by Teddy when the doomsday cult took over the bunker under the hotel, and fell in love with Alicia, who exiled him for refusing to do something for her. The pair encounter and put down a number of reanimated survivors from the bunker, concerning them as to Alicia's fate. They find the bunker abandoned and a note for Will reading "PADRE" which Will calls the dream of something better, but he doesn't know what or where it is. Deciding he needs to cut himself off from his loved ones in order to lead the Tower effectively, Strand throws Will off the Tower to his death, believing that Alicia will never forgive him for it, and uses a lighthouse beacon to draw a massive horde to the Tower to act as a moat against his enemies.
87	2	"Six Hours"	Michael E. Satrazemis	Andrew Chambliss & Ian Goldberg	October 24, 2021	0.96
Morgan, Grace and baby Mo have been living in the USS Pennsylvania since the nuclear blast, but are running low on supplies while Grace remains depressed and distant from Mo. With no other choice, Morgan convinces Grace to join him in a modified car to look for supplies, though they only have a six-hour window in which they can be safe. While passing through a town, Morgan and Grace hit a roadblock and encounter two terminally ill survivors, Fred and Bea, while a herd and a mysterious third survivor attacks. Morgan deals with the herd and drives the man away, but Grace is forced to kill Fred when he tries to smother Mo; the incident causes Grace to finally bond with Mo. After Morgan puts down her reanimated daughter Emma, Bea chooses to stay behind and die with her family, though she tells them about PADRE and where she thinks it might be. Morgan and Grace return to the sub where they encounter Howard and Strand's Rangers who are raiding it for supplies. Grace refuses an offer from Howard to join the Tower. Morgan and Grace find enough powdered milk to last them for months hidden in the sub's floor. Meanwhile, the mysterious attacker is revealed to be Josiah LaRoux, the twin brother of Emile LaRoux, the bounty hunter Morgan had killed months before. In possession of his brother's reanimated head, Josiah promises that he will exact vengeance upon Morgan for Emile's death.
88	3	"Cindy Hawkins"	Ron Underwood	Nick Bernardone & Jacob Pinion	October 31, 2021	0.87
Over the course of several months, John Sr. and June establish a routine while waiting out the year that June has determined is the time that they must wait before it is safe to go outside. However, the bunker becomes increasingly unstable over time with a wall collapse smashing their supply of liquor and revealing a secret room where Teddy had killed and embalmed his victims in the 1970s. John goes into alcoholic withdrawal and experiences hallucinations as a result of Teddy's last victim, Cindy Hawkins, whose body John had never been able to find. John's hallucinations and guilt cause him to search for clues to the location of her body with disregard to anything else. He emerges from the bunker due to Cindy calling to him and, after putting down a reanimated Dakota, finds the Stalkers watching him. The Stalkers demand that John and June surrender, while John realizes June has been lying the whole time about how long they must wait, afraid of facing the outside world without her husband. Briefly abandoning June to search for Cindy's body, John snaps out of it in time to kill the Stalkers and save June. The two subsequently discover Cindy's body in the bunker by accident, bringing John peace. The bunker collapses, but the two are rescued by Strand's Rangers and taken to the Tower. When Morgan arrives at the bunker, Strand contacts him on a radio. Morgan threatens to kill his former friend if Strand hurts anyone he cares about, but Strand is unmoved by his threats.
89	4	"Breathe with Me"	Tara Nicole Weyr	Nazrin Choudhury & David Johnson	November 7, 2021	0.73
Living in an old fort with the rest of Morgan's group following their rescue by Isabelle, Sarah begins an obsessive search for Wendell, who has been out of contact since the nuclear blast. Sarah encounters Josiah, who offers to help her find Wendell if she will help him get revenge on Morgan for the death of his brother Emile. Sarah reluctantly takes the deal and she, Josiah and his dog Rufus find Wendell's broken wheelchair in the possession of Sage, one of the Stalkers who has been collecting walkers and dispersing them around the area. In a moment of grief, Sarah causes Josiah's SUV to run off the road and crash near a cracked nuclear warhead which failed to detonate. As walkers surround them, Josiah encourages Sarah not to give up on Wendell and shares some of his past with her, bonding with Sarah. With the help of Morgan, Sarah and Josiah eliminate the herd, but Josiah attempts to kill Morgan and get his revenge. The struggle ends when Rufus is bitten by Emile's disembodied head before Sarah puts Emile's head down. Josiah tearfully euthanizes Rufus and makes amends with Morgan. Morgan and Josiah lead Sarah to the Tower where Strand reveals that he has Wendell, but he refuses to let Sarah in. After making Strand promise not to tell Wendell she was there, Sarah and Morgan part ways with Josiah and Morgan promises Sarah that they will get all of their friends back. At the same time, Sage recovers the warhead and brings it to the rest of the Stalkers.
90	5	"Till Death"	Lennie James	Justin Boyd & Ashley Cardiff	November 14, 2021	0.93
Dwight and Sherry have become a team of "ethical outlaws" known as the Dark Horses, protecting those in need while searching for PADRE. Their friends, the Larson family, are growing impatient due to dwindling supplies. Dwight and Sherry are captured by Strand's Rangers and brought to the Tower, where Strand attempts enlist their help to find Mickey, a woman who escaped the Tower in search of her missing husband Cliff. The two refuse the offer, comparing Strand and the Tower to Negan and the Sanctuary. Nevertheless, the two track down Mickey and offer her their help, only to discover that the Larsons have been murdered, causing Dwight to decide to take Strand's offer while Sherry heads off with Mickey to find Cliff. Encountering Eli, a criminal who he and Sherry had previously fought, Dwight learns that Strand hired Eli to murder the Larsons and, enraged by his actions, Dwight leaves Eli to be devoured by a herd of walkers. Sherry and Mickey find Mickey's gym surrounded by walkers and, fighting through the herd, the two find a reanimated Cliff inside and put him down. Afterwards, Mickey joins the Dark Horses who respond to a distress call, only to be ambushed by the Stalkers. Aware of the Dark Horses' reputation, the Stalkers request their help in finding PADRE.
91	6	"Reclamation"	Bille Woodruff	Alex Delyle & Calaya Michelle Stallworth	November 21, 2021	0.88
After sending the others to the Pennsylvania, Althea returns to her SWAT van alone, putting down a reanimated Riley and intending on resuming her solo journey of getting people's stories. Having deduced Althea's plan, Morgan arrives at the SWAT van just in time to witness the arrival of a CRM reclamation team searching for Althea's ex-girlfriend Isabelle who had gone AWOL after the blast. Despite Althea's attempts to warn Morgan and Grace off, they insist upon helping her while Morgan presses her to go after Isabelle. Althea tricks Morgan and Grace into using the CRM helicopter's fuel to refuel the SWAT van while she lures the CRM to Fort San Vicente, where she sets up an old cannon to kill them. The CRM captures Morgan and Grace and force Althea to admit that Isabelle is at a cabin in the Great Smoky Mountains. Morgan and Grace escape and lead the CRM to the fort, where they work together to kill them. Althea gives Morgan an interview of her own for the first time and departs in the CRM helicopter. Arriving at the cabin, Althea tells Isabelle she is ready to start a new life with her, even though it means they will constantly be on the run from the CRM. The two women embrace.
92	7	"The Portrait"	Heather Cappiello	Nick Bernardone	November 28, 2021	0.94
While Strand has an artist paint a portrait of him, he answers calls from a callbox outside, deciding which people he wants in his community. Morgan pleads to let June treat Mo, and Strand agrees in exchange for a favor. The Stalkers threaten to release walkers stuffed with pieces of the warhead if they aren't granted asylum. Morgan offers his assistance when Strand suddenly collapses after being poisoned. Strand tells Morgan that he wants to find Alicia, but Morgan tells him he needs to make the Tower a place that Alicia would want to live in. They agree to work together to find her, until Strand discovers Morgan was the one who poisoned him. Grace informs Strand that some of the walkers covered with material from the warhead have gotten loose and are outside the Tower, and bargains for Morgan's life by agreeing to join him. Morgan later comes across another group, revealed to be Dwight, Sherry and some members of the Stalkers. They take Morgan to their camp to meet their leader, revealed to be Alicia. When walkers arrive, Morgan notices they are covered with radioactive material and tells them not to shoot. They ignore him and shoot, releasing the radioactive gas.
93	8	"PADRE"	Michael E. Satrazemis	Ian Goldberg & Andrew Chambliss	December 5, 2021	0.84
In flashbacks, after being locked in the bunker by Teddy, Alicia reluctantly becomes the leader of the doomsday cult and meets Will, who helps her look for a way out. Alicia learns of PADRE, a secret government location that supposedly has the resources to rebuild the world, but which only the undead Senator Elias Vazquez knows the location of. While trying to escape from the bunker, Alicia is bitten by the Senator and is forced to amputate her arm; Will departs shortly thereafter, feeling that he is causing Alicia more harm than good by staying with her. In the present, fleeing from the Stalkers' attack on her people, Alicia enlists a reluctant Morgan's help to follow the Senator to PADRE. Covering themselves in walker guts for protection, the two wander around with the Senator, evading Strand's Rangers. Alicia later reveals to Morgan that she didn't amputate her arm in time to prevent the infection and believes it is only a matter of time before she dies and reanimates. The search ends when the Senator follows Strand's beacon to the Tower and he becomes lost in the walker moat. Alicia considers accepting Strand's offer to take her people in, only to find and put down the reanimated Will nearby. After learning that Strand murdered Will, the furious Alicia declares war on the Tower.
94	9	"Follow Me"	Heather Cappiello	Andrew Chambliss & Ian Goldberg	April 17, 2022	0.84
An unconscious Alicia is found by Paul, a deaf musician who takes cares of her. Alicia admits that after leaving the bunker, her search for PADRE led to a number of her people dying, leaving her filled with guilt and Arno, the leader of the Stalkers, out for revenge. Alicia is driven by a repeated dream of the Senator telling her to follow him to PADRE, but Paul suggests that the Senator is simply a manifestation of her subconscious telling her to follow her own path. While retrieving a stereo for Paul, Alicia is captured by Arno, who attempts to feed her to some of the reanimated people that she'd lost. She is rescued by Paul and the two set a trap for Arno, drawing him to Paul's house and using the stereo to draw a herd to deal with the Stalkers. Most of Arno's forces are killed, while Paul sacrifices himself so Alicia can escape. After returning to the Pennsylvania, Alicia decides to use the bunker's transmitter to gather an army to fight Strand using the promise of the safety the Tower will provide. Meanwhile, Arno and Sage find a blast crater filled with thousands of radioactive walkers that threaten everyone if they escape, renewing Arno's determination to take the Tower for the Stalkers.
95	10	"Mourning Cloak"	Lennie James	Nazrin Choudhury & Calaya Michelle Stallworth	April 24, 2022	0.79
Outside the Tower, Charlie is captured by Ali, a young Ranger in training, and taken inside where she claims to be trying to defect. With the Tower needing an elevator part from a radioactive building, Howard offers to take Charlie in if she can to retrieve the part, while secretly ordering Ali to learn Charlie's true intentions. Charlie and Ali, both teenagers who have missed out on much in their lives, quickly to fall in love and Charlie admits she was sent by Morgan to infiltrate the Tower, but in reality she wants to run away from the conflict completely so as to finally get a chance at a regular life. During the mission, Ali is attacked by a group of Stalkers attempting to learn why Strand is interested in the walker-filled crater, but he tricks them into getting devoured by walkers. After getting the elevator parts, Ali initially plans on leaving Charlie for dead before changing his mind and deciding to run away with her. As they leave, Charlie suddenly faints and is later diagnosed with terminal radiation sickness. After Ali's betrayal is discovered, Howard throws him off of the Tower, putting himself at odds with a furious June who begins plotting to take Strand down by any means necessary, while John Sr. plans to earn Strand's trust in order to be his voice of reason.
96	11	"Ofelia"	Alycia Debnam-Carey	Alex Delyle & David Johnson	May 1, 2022	0.74
While the group pursues a weapon cache, Daniel wanders off, chased by Luciana and Wes, convinced that Ofelia is still alive and is sending him a message from The Abigail. The three are captured by the Stalkers who attempt to extract the location of the weapon's cache from them, hinting at the existence of a greater danger and Luciana attempts to get Daniel to accept that Ofelia is dead. After sending half of the Stalkers on a wild goose chase, Daniel overpowers Sage, who says the Stalkers never had Ofelia, causing Daniel to kill him. Furious, Daniel lowers Arno into a pit full of walkers before Luciana and Wes can stop him. As he dies, Arno reveals the existence of the crater full of radioactive walkers and warns them that someone is letting the walkers out. Luciana convinces the remaining Stalkers to join Morgan's group in their fight against Strand and lies to Daniel that Ofelia is in the Tower, as she knows they will need Daniel's help against Strand. Disgusted by Luciana's actions, Wes defects from the group and goes to the Tower.
97	12	"Sonny Boy"	Ron Underwood	Justin Boyd & Jacob Pinion	May 8, 2022	0.72
As a paranoid Strand searches for what he believes is a "resistance" in the Tower, a radio is found amongst Howard's belongings and Mo vanishes, causing Strand to suspect that Howard is a traitor. Privately, Howard reveals to John that he is loyal to Strand because his family left him before the apocalypse and he hopes that they will find the Tower some day. John deduces that June kidnapped Mo and is trying to sneak her out through the tunnels to Morgan. While John is trying to stop her, a storm washes in a number of walkers, trapping the two. John reveals he contracted terminal radiation sickness while rescuing Charlie; John sees securing the Tower and Mo's future as his legacy. Strand rescues John and June, and John confesses to planting the radio on Howard so that he could become Strand's new partner. Unmoved, Strand forces John to throw Howard off of the Tower's roof before revealing that Howard's family had already been dead for months, which Strand had hidden from him. Realizing that Strand is beyond reason, John dons a makeshift suit of armor and carries Mo through the walker moat to Morgan. John is bitten in the process, and with the herd closing in, he sacrifices himself so Morgan can escape. Strand threatens to kill June and Grace if Morgan ever sets foot in the Tower and broadcasts an invitation to everyone else to join him. With Howard and John dead, Strand takes on Wes as his new partner.
98	13	"The Raft"	Gary Rake	Nazrin Choudhury & Nick Bernardone	May 15, 2022	0.74
Dwight and Sherry rescue a woman named Maya from walkers and Dwight sends her to the Tower despite the escalating war with Strand; Sherry expresses fears that Dwight will take Strand's deal to protect her and become the man he used to be while serving Negan. Having escaped with Mo, Morgan lures Strand's walker moat away, leaving the Tower vulnerable until nightfall. Morgan is joined by Alicia, who admits to being afraid that she won't be able to kill Strand when the time comes. Leading the herd to the crater, the two find it to be almost empty, as someone lowered a ramp into it so the radioactive walkers could escape. Dwight and Sherry are chased by Wes and several of Strand's Rangers in search of Mo. The two escape to the bunker, using it to contain the herd while they escape through the drainage pipes. Trapped by a ceiling collapse, Sherry reveals she is pregnant before using Alicia's recovered melee weapon to dig their way out, reuniting them with Morgan and Alicia. With the Pennsylvania having to be abandoned due to a radiation leak, Alicia prepares to lead everyone in an attack against the Tower, while Morgan departs with Mo on the sub's emergency life raft to find a safer home for her.
99	14	"Divine Providence"	Edward Ornelas	Alex Delyle & David Johnson	May 22, 2022	0.66
After Alicia arrives at the Tower with her army, Strand invites her, accompanied by Daniel, inside under the guise of discussing peace terms. Strand reveals his men are leading the radioactive walkers from the crater to the Tower to deal with Alicia's army while he keeps her prisoner until she comes around to his way of thinking. Breaking free, Alicia has a standoff with Strand who, after learning that Alicia doesn't have much time left to live, agrees to forgo his plan if she spends the time she has left with him. This change of heart causes Wes and the Rangers to mutiny, intending to kill Strand, Alicia and everyone else in order to protect the Tower. Strand, Alicia and Daniel reach the roof and turn off the beacon, while Daniel attempts to find Ofelia based on Luciana's lies to him. Strand brings Daniel to the dying Charlie, who together with Alicia, snaps Daniel out of his delusions, convincing Daniel to look after Charlie for what little time she has left. Strand and Alicia are captured by Wes, and Strand, to Alicia's shock, kills Wes despite her attempts to talk him down. As everyone makes their way into the Tower with the horde close behind, Strand betrays Alicia, believing she will never forgive him. Alicia overpowers Strand and broadcasts a message calling other survivors to the Tower, but their fight accidentally sets fire to the Tower as Alicia passes out.
100	15	"Amina"	Michael E. Satrazemis	Ian Goldberg & Andrew Chambliss	May 29, 2022	0.60
Alicia awakens to find herself on a beach, the group having successfully escaped the Tower and the horde while she was unconscious. They prepare to abandon Texas as the horde burning in the fire at the Tower is polluting the air beyond what they can survive. Alicia hallucinates, seeing a young masked girl, whom she chases after. Alicia is convinced she's going to die while the girl reveals she has survived a walker bite. The girl tells Alicia she needs to find her friend, whom Alicia later realizes is Strand. Alicia finds Strand in despair after the loss of his Tower and those he cares about. Alicia and Strand are prepared to die, but Alicia convinces him to rejoin the group after she learns the girl she has been speaking to is actually herself. Alicia makes contact with Morgan, who is adrift in the Gulf of Mexico and thinks PADRE may be real. Fearing she will die at sea and reanimate, Alicia refuses to join the group as they prepare to set sail and says her goodbyes, and tells Strand she loves him before collapsing. Some time later, she awakens, fully healed from her infection, and tells her hallucination she will help people looking for PADRE as she heads back towards the ruins of the Tower.
101	16	"Gone"	Sharat Raju	Andrew Chambliss & Ian Goldberg	June 5, 2022	0.71
Morgan washes ashore in Louisiana, and is rescued from a posse by Madison Clark, who kidnaps Mo and turns her over to PADRE. Having survived the stadium fire with lung damage that requires her to use an oxygen tank, Madison was recruited by PADRE to kidnap children with the promise of helping her find Nick and Alicia in return; she eventually decided to forget them due to the acts she committed. After realizing who Madison is, Morgan lies that he can take her to her children if she leads him to Mo. Needing another baby to trade for Mo, Morgan and Madison convince Ava, a pregnant survivor, to take PADRE's offer of safety. Morgan admits the truth about Nick and Alicia's fates to Madison, while it's revealed that Ava faked her pregnancy in order to get into PADRE and find her missing daughter. Morgan is forced to surrender Madison to the posse, who bury her in the sand to drown at high tide. Morgan rescues Madison before they discover that the posse has been killed by PADRE. Madison agrees to help Morgan rescue Mo. Posing as another Collector, Morgan offers the location of his group to PADRE, and he and Madison are blindfolded and taken on a boat for transport to PADRE.

== Production ==
On December 3, 2020, the series was renewed for a seventh season.

=== Casting ===
In July 2021, it was announced that Sydney Lemmon would return to the series as Isabelle. Lemmon last appeared in the show's fifth season, and made a voice-only appearance in the sixth season. In September 2021, Aisha Tyler was confirmed to have joined the cast in an unknown role. Tyler previously directed an episode in the sixth season. In December 2021, it was reported that Kim Dickens would reprise her role as Madison Clark this season, and continue as a series regular in the eighth season. The seventh season is the final one to feature Alycia Debnam-Carey, as she confirmed her exit from the series after the broadcast of the fifteenth episode of the season, stating, "I decided it was time for me to move on as an actor and as a person."

=== Filming and writing ===
Production began in April 2021 in Texas, and ended in December 2021. Cast members Lennie James and Alycia Debnam-Carey each directed episodes in the seventh season; James previously directed an episode in the prior season and Debnam-Carey made her directorial debut this season.

Showrunner Ian Goldberg described the seventh season as a "nuclear zombie apocalypse western story", stating:

"The world has changed. The landscape has now changed. We have multiple nuclear warheads that have detonated, so that's gonna change everything. That's gonna change the walkers, that's gonna change the living conditions, that's gonna change everything about how our characters navigate this world. Just when they got a handle on how to deal with the apocalypse, now we have another apocalypse on top of the one they've been living in."

== Release ==
The season premiered on October 17, 2021, on AMC, with each episode available a week early via AMC+.

== Reception ==
=== Ratings ===
Viewership and ratings per episode of Fear the Walking Dead season 7
No.	Title	Air date	Rating (18–49)	Viewers (millions)	DVR (18–49)	DVR viewers (millions)	Total (18–49)	Total viewers (millions)
1	"The Beacon"	October 17, 2021	0.3	1.09	—N/a	—N/a	—N/a	—N/a
2	"Six Hours"	October 24, 2021	0.2	0.96	0.2	0.57	0.4	1.53
3	"Cindy Hawkins"	October 31, 2021	0.2	0.87	—N/a	—N/a	—N/a	—N/a
4	"Breathe with Me"	November 7, 2021	0.2	0.73	—N/a	—N/a	—N/a	—N/a
5	"Till Death"	November 14, 2021	0.2	0.93	—N/a	—N/a	—N/a	—N/a
6	"Reclamation"	November 21, 2021	0.2	0.88	0.1	0.59	0.3	1.47
7	"The Portrait"	November 28, 2021	0.2	0.94	0.1	0.50	0.3	1.44
8	"PADRE"	December 5, 2021	0.2	0.84	0.1	0.54	0.3	1.38
9	"Follow Me"	April 17, 2022	0.2	0.84	—N/a	—N/a	—N/a	—N/a
10	"Mourning Cloak"	April 24, 2022	0.2	0.79	—N/a	—N/a	—N/a	—N/a
11	"Ofelia"	May 1, 2022	0.1	0.74	—N/a	—N/a	—N/a	—N/a
12	"Sonny Boy"	May 8, 2022	0.1	0.72	—N/a	—N/a	—N/a	—N/a
13	"The Raft"	May 15, 2022	0.1	0.74	—N/a	—N/a	—N/a	—N/a
14	"Divine Providence"	May 22, 2022	0.1	0.66	—N/a	—N/a	—N/a	—N/a
15	"Amina"	May 29, 2022	0.1	0.60	—N/a	—N/a	—N/a	—N/a
16	"Gone"	June 5, 2022	0.1	0.71	—N/a	—N/a	—N/a	—N/a
