= The Wrong Side of Where You Are Now =

- Fear the Walking Dead episode
- Episode no.: Season 4 Episode 7
- Directed by: Sarah Boyd
- Written by: Melissa Scrivner Love
- Original air date: June 3, 2018
- Running time: 42 minutes

Guest appearances
- Kevin Zegers as Melvin; Alexa Nisenson as Charlie; Evan Gamble as Ennis; Sebastian Sozzi as Cole; Rhoda Griffis as Vivian

Episode chronology
← Previous "Just in Case"	Next → "No One's Gone"
- Fear the Walking Dead (season 4)

"The Wrong Side of Where You Are Now" is the seventh episode of the fourth season of the post-apocalyptic horror television series Fear the Walking Dead, which aired on AMC on June 3, 2018 in the United States.

== Plot ==
In the present, the two groups engage in gunfire. Naomi tries to get medical supplies for John from the ambulance, but Mel drives off in it. Alicia fires at the ambulance with a grenade launcher and accuses Naomi of betraying her trust. Althea rides up in her SWAT vehicle, where Naomi and Morgan carry John inside, and Charlie joins them at Morgan's request. Alicia finds Mel crawling from the ambulance and asks him how long Naomi had been colluding with them. He does not answer and Alicia then stabs him. In flashbacks, Charlie goes to the stadium and asks Madison if she can help Mel, who is injured from a car accident. Charlie claims she and Mel have left the Vultures after a fight with Ennis. Mel tells Madison that Ennis is planning on destroying the stadium. After patching up Mel, Madison gives him a truck with supplies and forces him to leave by himself. Charlie begs the others to bring back Mel. Alicia and Nick leave the stadium to find Mel. Ennis and the Vultures arrive at the stadium and unleash several trucks filled with the dead. Back in the present, everyone in the SWAT vehicle arrives at the stadium, revealed to be filled with the dead.

== Reception ==
"The Wrong Side of Where You Are Now" received positive reviews from critics. On Rotten Tomatoes, "The Wrong Side of Where You Are Now" garnered a 75% rating, with an average score of 7.17/10 based on 8 reviews.

=== Ratings ===
The episode was seen by 1.97 million viewers in the United States on its original air date, below the previous episodes ratings of 2.31 million viewers.
