= Just in Case (Fear the Walking Dead) =

- Fear the Walking Dead episode
- Episode no.: Season 4 Episode 6
- Directed by: Daisy von Scherler Mayer
- Written by: Richard Naing
- Original air date: May 20, 2018
- Running time: 46 minutes

Guest appearances
- Kevin Zegers as Melvin; Sebastian Sozzi as Cole; Evan Gamble as Ennis; Rhoda Griffis as Vivian

Episode chronology
← Previous "Laura"	Next → "The Wrong Side of Where You Are Now"
- Fear the Walking Dead (season 4)

"Just in Case" is the sixth episode of the fourth season of the post-apocalyptic horror television series Fear the Walking Dead, which aired on AMC on May 20, 2018 in the United States.

== Plot ==
In flashbacks, Madison and Strand join Naomi on a supply run to a FEMA shelter that may have seeds and fertilizer. They rest for the night at a motel, but when Madison wakes in the morning, she discovers Naomi is missing. Naomi goes to the shelter, which is filled with infected, and retrieves a set of keys marked "JIC." She is eventually surrounded by infected and takes refuge at the top of scaffolding. Madison and Strand arrive and are able to save her. Naomi explains that she and her daughter, Rose, had stayed at the shelter. When Rose caught pneumonia, she left to find antibiotics. But when she returned, she discovered that Rose had died, turned and infected everyone else. Naomi then takes Madison and Strand to a truck stocked with supplies. They return to the stadium with plants and fertilizer, and the Vultures decide to vacate the parking lot. In the present, Alicia, Strand and Luciana face off with Mel and the Vultures at the meeting spot. Morgan and John are also present. A woman pulls up in a vehicle, revealed to be Naomi. Alicia then shoots at Naomi but accidentally hits John when he steps in the way.

== Reception ==
"Just in Case" received very positive reviews from critics. On Rotten Tomatoes, "Just in Case" garnered an 88% rating, with an average score of 7/10 based on 8 reviews.

=== Ratings ===
The episode was seen by 2.31 million viewers in the United States on its original air date, below the previous episodes ratings of 2.46 million viewers.
