= Another Day in the Diamond =

- Fear the Walking Dead episode
- Episode no.: Season 4 Episode 2
- Directed by: Michael E. Satrazemis
- Written by: Andrew Chambliss; Ian Goldberg
- Original air date: April 22, 2018
- Running time: 44 minutes

Guest appearances
- Kevin Zegers as Melvin; Sebastian Sozzi as Cole; Evan Gamble as Ennis; Rhoda Griffis as Vivian; Alexa Nisenson as Charlie

Episode chronology
← Previous "What's Your Story?"	Next → "Good Out Here"
- Fear the Walking Dead (season 4)

"Another Day in the Diamond" is the second episode of the fourth season of the post-apocalyptic horror television series Fear the Walking Dead, which aired on AMC on April 22, 2018.

This marks the first appearance of Jenna Elfman playing a character under the alias Naomi.

== Plot ==
Madison, Nick, Alicia, Strand, and Luciana are a part of a community living in a baseball stadium. Nick is farming vegetables, but weevils are destroying them. Madison and others, excluding Nick, set out to find Charlie's family, a young girl in the community. Madison's group reaches a deserted town and they split up to search. Madison and Alicia find a burned down camp near giant oil tanks, which has a white flag with the number "457". Madison comes across a woman named Naomi and Madison invites her to their community. At night, a large convoy of trucks approach the stadium. Mel, the leader of a group known as the Vultures, rounds up walkers outside the stadium and into a truck; it is then labeled "12". Madison goes out to talk with Mel, and he tells Madison he knows of their weevil problem, thanks to Charlie who is revealed as a spy. Mel orders Madison to give them all their supplies or they will die from their lack of resources. Madison refuses and walks away. Catching up to the events of the previous episode: Luciana finds a flag marked "51" in Althea's SWAT truck, and Alicia orders them to take them to where they found the flag.

== Reception ==
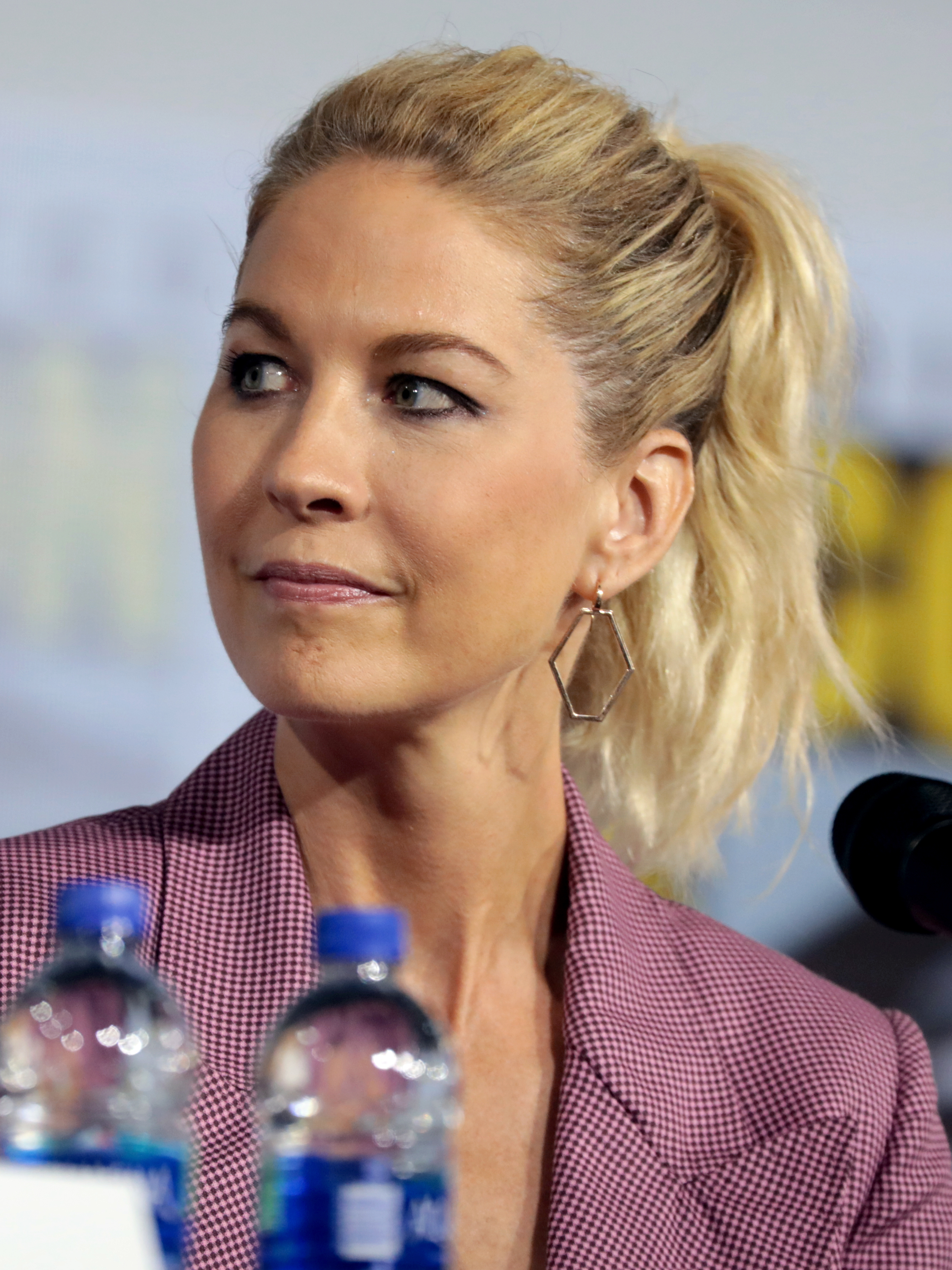
Jenna Elfman made her first appearance as June in this episode.

"Another Day in the Diamond" received very positive reviews from critics. On Rotten Tomatoes, "Another Day in the Diamond" garnered a 90% rating, with an average score of 7.5/10 based on 10 reviews.

=== Ratings ===
The episode was seen by 3.07 million viewers in the United States on its original air date, far below the previous episodes ratings of 4.09 million viewers.
