= End of the Line (Fear the Walking Dead) =

- Fear the Walking Dead episode
- Episode no.: Season 5 Episode 16
- Directed by: Michael E. Satrazemis
- Written by: Andrew Chambliss; Ian Goldberg
- Original air date: September 29, 2019
- Running time: 51 minutes

Guest appearances
- Daryl Mitchell as Wendell; Mo Collins as Sarah Rabinowitz; Peter Jacobson as Jacob Kessner; Colby Hollman as Wes; Colby Minifie as Virginia; Holly Curran as Janis; Cooper Dodson as Dylan; Bailey Gavulic as Annie; Ethan Suess as Max

Episode chronology
← Previous "Channel 5"	Next → "The End Is the Beginning"
- Fear the Walking Dead (season 5)

"End of the Line" is the sixteenth and final episode of the fifth season of the post-apocalyptic horror television series Fear the Walking Dead, which aired on AMC on September 29, 2019. It was written by showrunners Andrew Chambliss and Ian Goldberg, and directed by Michael E. Satrazemis.

== Plot ==
After hallucinating Sherry's voice, Dwight finds a group of horses near the remains of the caravan and returns to help. The group clear Humbug's Gulch of walkers, revealed to be the previous survivors who used the location before Virginia massacred them for resisting her. They decide to use the walkers to ambush the Pioneers, but are forced to abandon the plan when they discover that Luciana is with them. Knowing that Virginia is on the way, the group enjoys the time they have left together, as John and June finally get married.

When Virginia arrives, she splits the group into her various communities and gets a doctor to examine Grace, who is revealed to be pregnant and malnourished. Once everyone is gone, Virginia shoots Morgan in the shoulder and leaves him to die. Morgan radios a message to his friends, encouraging them to "just live" as walkers approach.

== Reception ==
"End of the Line" received poor reviews. It currently holds a 23% rating with an average score of 4/10 out of 13 on the review aggregator Rotten Tomatoes. The critics' consensus reads: "Many Fear fans' patience will have reached 'The End of the Line' in this lackluster finale, mired in nonsensical decision-making and a cliffhanger that feels like a waste of another pivotal character."

Nick Romano, writing for Entertainment Weekly, denigrated the episode and wrote: "It mostly felt like a waste of an episode... It's not that the performances from the cast are bad. It's poor narrative planning that breeds less confidence in those manning FTWD, even with the promise of never having to hear another Morgan life lesson." Erik Kain of Forbes was also negative about the episode and wrote: "It's a pathetic, anticlimactic, ridiculous conclusion to one of the worst seasons in Walking Dead history. Despite a few bright moments, this was the kind of finale that should make everyone involved with its creation ashamed."

Writing for Syfy Wire, Alyse Wax was one of the few people who was positive on the episode and wrote his praised saying: "This was a good episode, and a strong way to end a wobbly season. It had a little bit of everything: a wedding. A baby. A ton of zombies. A cliffhanger."

=== Rating ===
The episode was seen by 1.51 million viewers in the United States on its original air date, higher than the previous episodes.
