= Buried (Fear the Walking Dead) =

- Fear the Walking Dead episode
- Episode no.: Season 4 Episode 4
- Directed by: Magnus Martens
- Written by: Alex Delyle
- Original air date: May 6, 2018
- Running time: 46 minutes

Guest appearances
- Kevin Zegers as Melvin; Sebastian Sozzi as Cole; Evan Gamble as Ennis

Episode chronology
← Previous "Good Out Here"	Next → "Laura"
- Fear the Walking Dead (season 4)

"Buried" is the fourth episode of the fourth season of the post-apocalyptic horror television series Fear the Walking Dead, which aired on AMC on May 6, 2018.

== Plot ==
Alicia, Strand, and Luciana tell Althea their stories about how they ended up in their current situation, which led to Nick's death. In flashbacks, various groups go on supply runs; Strand and Cole search a nursery for plants; Nick and Luciana search a library; and Alicia and Naomi go to a water park. At the library, there is no food, but Nick insists on finding books because he argues people need more than just food. At the water park, Alicia and Naomi find various medical supplies and a machine gun. Strand shows Cole a secret car that is filled with supplies just for himself. At the stadium, Madison tells Mel she is willing to build a community together, but Mel scoffs at the idea. Nick suggests to Madison they should venture further north to find seeds and fertilizer to bring back, instead of moving to a new location. In the present, the group tells Althea that they should have left the stadium. They stop the SWAT van, where they dig up a cache of weapons—to kill the Vultures with. The group then buries Nick. John recognizes a backpack, which belongs to Naomi, revealing that she is Laura. Alicia tells John that Laura died at the stadium. Everyone leaves in the van, except Morgan and John, who go off alone.

== Reception ==
"Buried" received very positive reviews from critics. On Rotten Tomatoes, "Buried" garnered an 88% rating, with an average score of 8.0/10 based on 8 reviews.

=== Ratings ===
The episode was seen by 2.49 million viewers in the United States on its original air date, below the previous episodes ratings of 2.71 million viewers.
