= Channel 5 (Fear the Walking Dead) =

- Fear the Walking Dead episode
- Episode no.: Season 5 Episode 15
- Directed by: David Barrett
- Written by: Michael Alaimo; Samir Mehta
- Original air date: September 22, 2019
- Running time: 44 minutes

Guest appearances
- Daryl Mitchell as Wendell; Mo Collins as Sarah Rabinowitz; Peter Jacobson as Rabbi Jacob Kessner; Colby Hollman as Wes; Colby Minifie as Virginia; Joe Massingill as Tom; Holly Curran as Janis; Cooper Dodson as Dylan; Bailey Gavulic as Annie; Ethan Suess as Max

Episode chronology
← Previous "Today and Tomorrow"	Next → "End of the Line"
- Fear the Walking Dead (season 5)

"Channel 5" is the fifteenth and penultimate episode of the fifth season of the post-apocalyptic horror television series Fear the Walking Dead, which aired on AMC on September 22, 2019. The episode was written by Michael Alaimo and Samir Mehta, and directed by David Barrett.

== Plot ==
Virginia creates a documentary to entice people to join the Pioneers, inspiring Althea to create a new documentary to counter Virginia's message. Grace's condition continues to deteriorate. Tom reunites with his sister Janis, who turns out to be the woman Wes rescued, and dedicates himself to helping create the documentary to show people the differences between the two factions. As the group attempts to cross a damaged bridge, Virginia confronts them. She offers to help them cross, as well as information on Sherry's whereabouts, if they join her.

When no one steps forward, Virginia summons a herd of walkers to force them to need her help. Most of the group make it to safety, but Tom is killed when the bridge collapses, and the group also loses the tanker and most of its supplies. They enter Humbug's Gulch, a nearby Old West-style theme park where John thinks they can safely settle, but is infested by a horde of walkers. Feeling they have no other choice, Morgan turns to Virginia for help, while Dwight storms off angry at the decision.

== Reception ==
"Channel 5" was panned by critics and audiences alike. It currently holds a 17% rating with an average score of 3.75/10 out of 12 on the review aggregator Rotten Tomatoes, the worst reviewed episode on the site for the series and franchise. The critics' consensus reads: "'Channel 5' blows up any sense of the season's narrative momentum in its homestretch with a cheesy propaganda battle that trips Fear into self-parody."

Erik Kain of Forbes was negative about the episode and wrote: "A team of writers and producers sat around a table and decided that this was the story they wanted to tell. It's unfathomable. It's absurd. But somehow it all made it to production and here we are."

=== Rating ===
The episode was seen by 1.34 million viewers in the United States on its original air date, above the previous episodes.
