= No One's Gone =

- Fear the Walking Dead episode
- Episode no.: Season 4 Episode 8
- Directed by: Michael E. Satrazemis
- Written by: Ian Goldberg; Andrew Chambliss
- Original air date: June 10, 2018
- Running time: 46 minutes

Guest appearances
- Kevin Zegers as Melvin; Alexa Nisenson as Charlie; Sebastian Sozzi as Cole; Rhoda Griffis as Vivian

Episode chronology
← Previous "The Wrong Side of Where You Are Now"	Next → "People Like Us"
- Fear the Walking Dead (season 4)

"No One's Gone" is the eighth episode and mid-season finale of the fourth season of the post-apocalyptic horror television series Fear the Walking Dead, which aired on AMC on June 10, 2018 in the United States.

This episode features the apparent death of Madison Clark (Kim Dickens) who is later revealed to be still alive in the seventh season finale. Madison's mysterious survival is explained in the penultimate episode of the eighth season where it's stated that she had taken shelter in the tank of the water truck shown being parked near the stadium gate at the end of "The Wrong Side of Where You Are Now." It's also revealed in the sixth season that despite most of the stadium's residents apparently dying in this episode, they survived, resurfacing in "Mother."

== Plot ==
Sometime after the destruction of the Gonzalez Dam, Madison meets Althea, whom she tries to rob without success. Madison eventually gives her a story from when her children were little and explains how she is trying to protect their innocence. Upon their departure, Althea gives Madison food, a radio, and a map, allowing her to find her children. Althea's kindness inspires Madison to form the stadium community, but Althea never learns Madison's name. In the present, Naomi and Morgan struggle to get supplies to save John's life while Althea and Charlie deal with an attack from Alicia's group. The subsequent revelation that Althea met Madison and Morgan's intervention convinces Alicia to stop her path of vengeance. At night, Alicia's group finishes telling their story about the fall of the stadium, including how everyone else died when they tried to flee and were overrun. Madison is revealed to have led the Infected into the stadium to contain the herd and give her children, Strand, and Luciana a chance to survive. Madison ultimately sets the herd ablaze within the stadium, seemingly sacrificing herself to save the others. In honor of Madison's memory, Althea names the story after her and the group shares the same noodles she gave to Madison when they first met.

== Reception ==
"No One's Gone" received mixed reviews from critics, with Madison’s presumed death receiving criticism. On Rotten Tomatoes, "No One's Gone" garnered a 67% rating, with an average score of 8.0/10 based on 9 reviews.

=== Ratings ===
The episode was seen by 2.32 million viewers in the United States on its original air date, above the previous episodes ratings of 1.97 million viewers.
