= Good Out Here =

- Fear the Walking Dead episode
- Episode no.: Season 4 Episode 3
- Directed by: Dan Liu
- Written by: Shintaro Shimosawa
- Original air date: April 29, 2018
- Running time: 45 minutes

Guest appearances
- Kevin Zegers as Melvin; Evan Gamble as Ennis

Episode chronology
| ← Previous "Another Day in the Diamond" | Next → "Buried" |
- Fear the Walking Dead (season 4)

"Good Out Here" is the third episode of the fourth season of the post-apocalyptic horror television series Fear the Walking Dead, which aired on AMC on April 29, 2018.

This episode features the death of Nick Clark (Frank Dillane). Dillane asked to leave the show during filming for the third season. Despite the death of Nick Clark, Dillane continued to appear throughout the flashbacks scenes taking place before the current events in the first half of the season.

== Plot ==
In flashbacks, Nick and Madison go on a supply run, however when they arrive, they discover that Mel's brother Ennis has already looted it. Charlie eavesdropped on Madison and obtained the location, giving it to Ennis. Nick pleads with Charlie to not listen to the Vultures. Nick then attacks Ennis with his knife, but Madison stops him from killing Ennis. Charlie goes with Ennis in his blue El Camino and they drove off. In the present, the SWAT vehicle swerves off the road and crashes after a commotion inside the vehicle between the two groups. Nick spots the blue El Camino and chases after it. The others find a service station which has a truck with wire cable, that they can use to tow the SWAT vehicle from the mud. Returning to the SWAT truck, they fight off various infected and successfully tow it. Nick finds Ennis at a farm and they fight inside a silo. Nick impales Ennis on a deer antler display, killing him. Nick is then shot by Charlie. The rest of the group arrives, where they try to revive him, but he dies. Alicia sobs and is left devastated.

== Reception ==
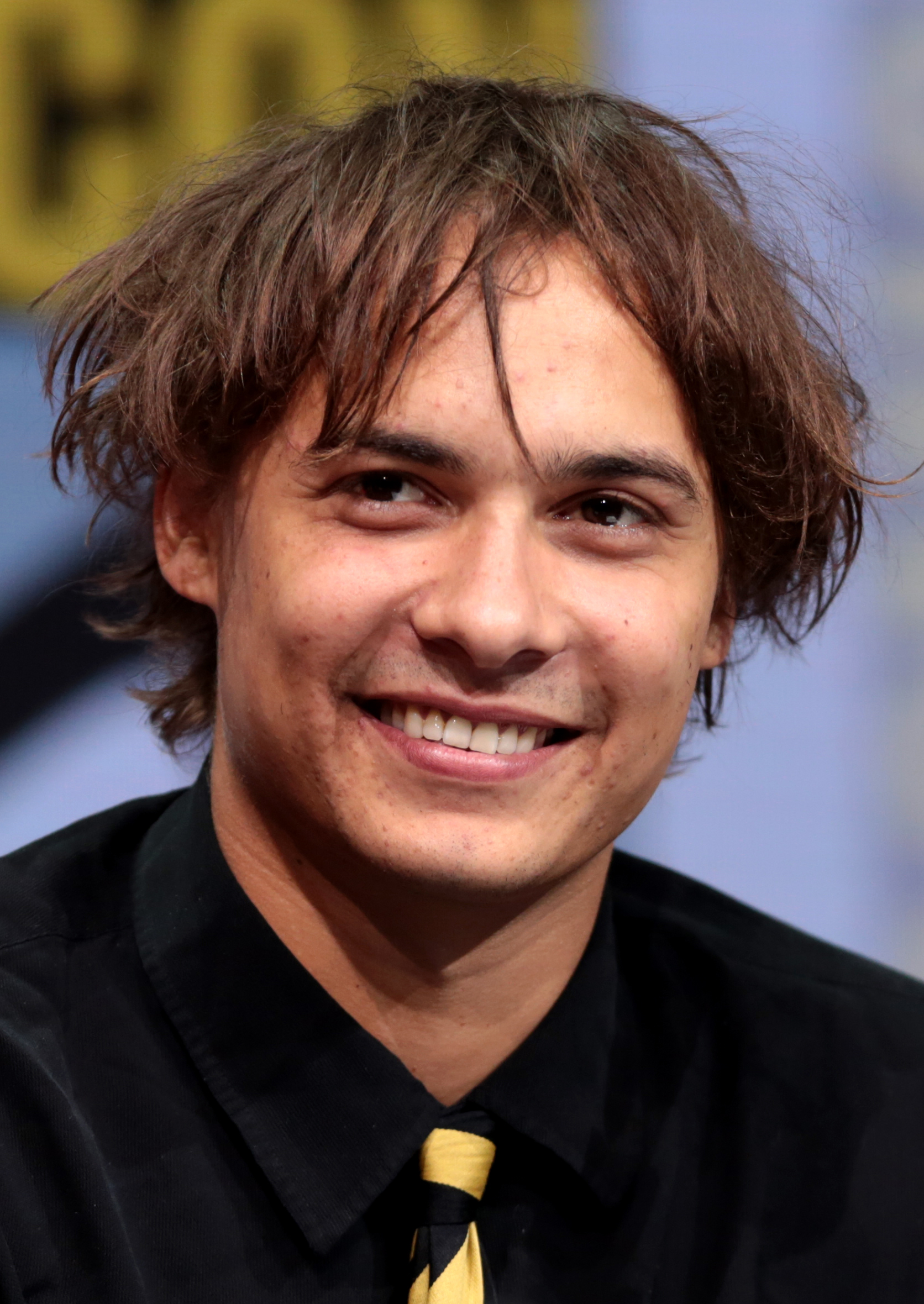
The episode marks the death of Nick Clark played by Frank Dillane

"Good Out Here" received mostly positive reviews from critics. On Rotten Tomatoes, "Good Out Here" garnered an 82% rating, with an average score of 8.5/10 based on 11 reviews, The site's critical consensus reads: "'Good Out Here' will instill genuine Fear in Walking Dead viewers, treating fans to creeping dread before executing a devastating exit for a main character".

=== Ratings ===
The episode was seen by 2.71 million viewers in the United States on its original air date, below the previous episodes ratings of 3.07 million viewers.
