= Laura (Fear the Walking Dead) =

- Fear the Walking Dead episode
- Episode no.: Season 4 Episode 5
- Directed by: Michael E. Satrazemis
- Written by: Anna Fishko
- Original air date: May 13, 2018
- Running time: 46 minutes

Episode chronology
← Previous "Buried"	Next → "Just in Case"
- Fear the Walking Dead (season 4)

"Laura" is the fifth episode of the fourth season of the post-apocalyptic horror television series Fear the Walking Dead, which aired on AMC on May 13, 2018.

== Plot ==
In flashbacks, John finds Naomi unconscious in the water outside his cabin. John brings her inside, dresses her wound and lets her rest. Because she refuses to tell her name, John calls her Laura. John notices that more infected have been washing up on the creek surrounding his cabin, so he and Naomi canoe upstream to discover a broken guardrail on a bridge. They then patch the guardrail with a piece of metal. During the night, Naomi reveals to John that she lost a child. The next day, John teaches Naomi how to fish and they play Scrabble. The infected have still been floating downstream, so they investigate the bridge again. This time, they block the gap with a Jeep. During a scuffle with the infected, John refuses to use his pistols, but instead stabs them. He explains his refusal to use firearms is because of an incident from when he was a police officer. The infected eventually knock the Jeep into the river and float towards John's cabin. John and Naomi fight off the infected, where John uses his weapons to save Naomi. Later, John tells Naomi he loves her and they kiss. The next day, John discovers Naomi has left, but leaves a note with Scrabble tiles: "I love you too I'm sorry."

== Reception ==
"Laura" received very positive reviews from critics. On Rotten Tomatoes, "Laura" garnered an 90% rating, with an average score of 8.83/10 based on 10 reviews.

=== Ratings ===
The episode was seen by 2.46 million viewers in the United States on its original air date, slightly below the previous episodes ratings of 2.49 million viewers.
