= The End Is the Beginning =

- Fear the Walking Dead episode
- Episode no.: Season 6 Episode 1
- Directed by: Michael E. Satrazemis
- Written by: Andrew Chambliss; Ian Goldberg
- Original air date: October 11, 2020
- Running time: 52 minutes

Guest appearances
- Colby Minifie as Virginia; Demetrius Grosse as Emile LaRoux; Michael Abbot Jr. as Isaac; Brigitte Kali Canales as Rachel

Episode chronology
| ← Previous "End of the Line" | Next → "Welcome to the Club" |
- Fear the Walking Dead (season 6)

"The End Is the Beginning" is the first episode of the sixth season of the post-apocalyptic horror television series Fear the Walking Dead, which aired on AMC on October 11, 2020, in the United States. The episode was written by Andrew Chambliss and Ian Goldberg, and directed by Michael E. Satrazemis.

== Plot ==
Virginia hires Emile, a bounty hunter, to find Morgan Jones' whereabouts and bring her his head. Morgan is in bad shape due to his gunshot wound, which is infected and gangrenous. The smell of his wound repels walkers, however.

Morgan meets a man named Isaac who offers his help, but Morgan declines because he doesn't want Isaac involved. Emile and his dog, Rufus, arrive outside the store in which they are hiding. Isaac comes out and Emile asks him about Morgan and his whereabouts, Isaac says he doesn’t know. Observing that he is nervous, Emile enters the store, but Morgan is gone, so Emile leaves.

Isaac takes Morgan to his shelter and tries to extract the bullet from his wound, but Morgan fights him off. Isaac asks Morgan to help him get to his wife, who is pregnant. Emile manages to find Morgan and prepares to kill Isaac, but Morgan shoots him in the arm and the two flee in his truck. On the way, Isaac reveals to Morgan that he was a member of Virginia's group, but he and his wife left for a better life.

Isaac takes Morgan to the hideout where his wife is and they kill all the walkers surrounding it. That night, Emile finds them and Morgan surrenders to Emile in exchange of sparing Isaac. Isaac attacks Emile, but he is soon overpowered. Morgan knocks out Emile, and Isaac reveals he was bitten by a walker. Emile gets up and fights Morgan again. Morgan beheads Emile in the end. Morgan wakes the next day, and finds his bullet has been extracted, and that Isaac's wife Rachel has given birth to their daughter. Morgan learns that Isaac succumbed to his infection and died. Rachel tells Morgan they have named their daughter after him. Morgan says goodbye to Rachel. Later, Morgan leaves Emile's severed head in a box for Virginia to find.

Elsewhere, two men spray-paint "The End Is the Beginning" on a submarine stranded off the Galveston coast while waiting for Emile to bring them a mysterious key that is now in Morgan's possession.

== Reception ==
=== Critical response ===
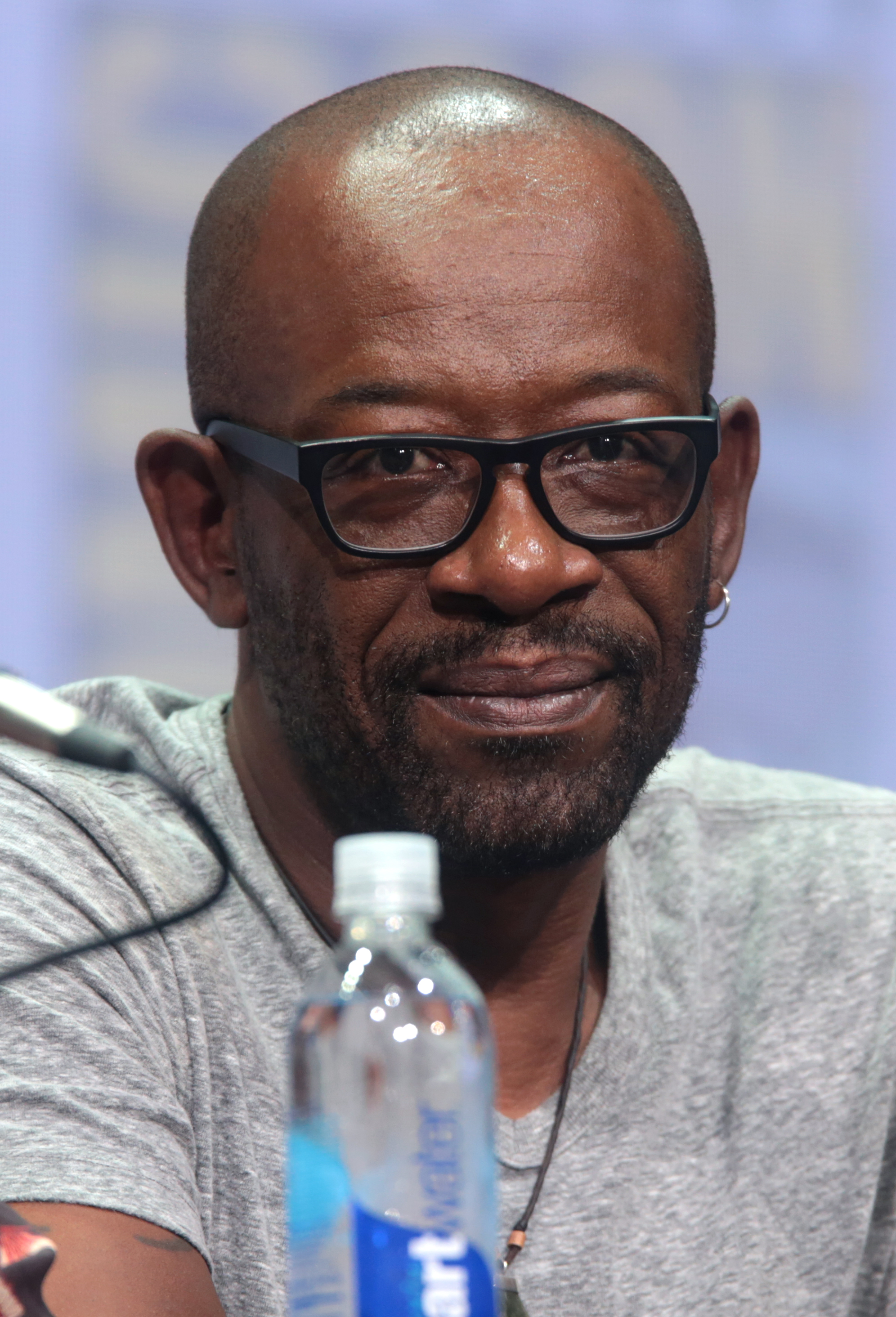
Lennie James received praise from critics for his performance as Morgan Jones.

Matt Fowler of IGN gave "The End is the Beginning" a 8/10 rating, stating; "Fear the Walking Dead may have only showed us the fate of one of its characters, but the episode, considering how hard it is to give Morgan something new to do, was pretty strong." David S.E. Zapanta of Den of Geek! gave it a rating of 4/5, writing: "By episode’s end, Morgan finally embraces his rebirth, declaring over the radio to Virginia, Morgan Jones is dead. And you are dealing with someone else now.' As to whether he deserves this second chance remains to be seen." Alex Zalben of Decider praised Morgan's character development and James' performance.

=== Ratings ===
The episode was seen by 1.59 million viewers in the United States on its original air date, above the previous episodes.
