= Austin Zajur =

American actor

- Born: August 12, 1995 (age 31); United States
- Occupation: Actor
- Years active: 2008–present

Austin Zajur (born August 12, 1995) is an American actor known for his lead roles in films such as Scary Stories to Tell in the Dark and Fist Fight, and television shows such as Kidding, Mythic Quest and Point of Honor.

== Early life ==
Zajur was born on August 12, 1995, in the United States. His father Michel Zajur was born in Mexico, to a family of Lebanese-Syrian descent. His father is also the president and CEO of the Virginia Hispanic Chamber of Commerce.

== Career ==
Zajur began his acting career at the age of 11 on the set of the miniseries John Adams, where he played the guest role of Militiaman / Boston Local. As a child actor, he would spend his days traveling back and forth to New York from Richmond. At 20, he took a leap of faith and moved to New York to focus on his acting career.

In 2010, he appeared in the educational animated children's television series Wonder Pets!, where he played the voice role as Monkey in third season and episode sixteen: "Happy Mother's Day/Save the Sun Bear".

In 2011, Zajur played the role such as young You in the first season, episode four of The Six.

In 2014, Zajur appeared in episode nine of the season two of The Carrie Diaries as Dorrit's Punk Friend.

In 2015, Zajur played the character of Cadet in the television film Point of Honor. He played the role the Teen Gang Member in the period drama series Turn: Washington's Spies, starring Jamie Bell as Abraham Woodhull. Also appeared in the series Evil Kin as Stanford Clark in season three, episode 11: "Broken Bond".

In 2016, Zajur appeared in the period medical drama series Mercy Street, as Drunk Yankee in season one, episode 2: "The Haversack". Zajur made his film debut in director Kieran Valla's Delinquent, where he played the role such as Carter. He played the role of Blair in "Ghost Confessions", the episode twelve of the eighth season of A Haunting.

In 2017, Zajur had basically just moved to Manhattan when he got a call from his agent, saying he was going to Atlanta for a table read for the film Fist Fight with Ice Cube, Charlie Day and Tracy Morgan, he headed to Los Angeles to work on more projects. In the 2017 short film, Stag, he played the character of Robbie. He played the role of Son in the web series CollegeHumor Originals and also played Austin in Vanoss Superhero School.

In 2018, Zajur appeared on TV shows Speechless as Dorky Friend #1. He played the role as Sal in the 2018 short film The Day of Matthew Montgomery alongside Jesse Bradford and Brianna Thorne. He has worked with Jim Carrey in the comedy-drama series Kidding as Diego.

In 2019, Zajur starred in the horror film Scary Stories to Tell in the Dark, which was released on August 23, 2019, where he played role of Charlie "Chuck" Steinberg, alongside Zoe Colletti, Michael Garza, Austin Abrams, Gabriel Rush and Natalie Ganzhorn. He played of the role the Band Member #2 in the series Labeled.

In 2021, Zajur plays Dan Bonavure in the drama film The Fallout starring Jenna Ortega and Maddie Ziegler. He played the role of Gideon, the fifth episode of the first season of Cruel Summer.

In 2022, Zajur played the role of Eric French in the 2022 film Student Body. He also appeared as Blockchain Coltrane in the comedy film Clerks III alongside Brian O'Halloran, Jeff Anderson, Trevor Fehrman and Jason Mewes.

== Personal life ==
Since 2019, Zajur is in a relationship with actress Harley Quinn Smith. The couple announced their engagement on March 23, 2025.

== Filmography ==
=== Film ===
Year	Title	Role	Notes
2016	Delinquent	Carter	
2017	Fist Fight	Neil	
2017	Stag	Robbie	Short film
2018	The Day of Matthew Montgomery	Sal	Short film
2019	Scary Stories to Tell in the Dark	Chuck Steinberg	
2019	Countdown	Brock McMasters	Uncredited
2021	The Fallout	Dan Bonavure	
2022	Student Body	Eric French	
2022	Clerks III	Blockchain Coltrane	
2023	Fool's Paradise	Mosquito Boy/Stand In	
TBA	Robbery	Billy	Short film; post-production
2024	The 4:30 Movie	Brian David	

=== Television ===
Year	Title	Role	Notes
2008	John Adams	Militiaman / Boston Local	2 episodes
2010	Wonder Pets!	Monkey	Episode: "Happy Mother's Day/Save the Sun Bear"
2011	The Six	Young You	Episode: "The Six Girls You'll See Back Home"
2014	The Carrie Diaries	Dorrit's Punk Friend	Episode: "Under Pressure"
2015	Point of Honor	Cadet	Television movie; uncredited
2015	Turn: Washington's Spies	Teen Gang Member	Episode: "Men of Blood"
2015	Evil Kin	Sanford Clark	Episode: "Broken Bond"
2016	Mercy Street	Drunk Yankee	Episode: "The Haversack"
2016	A Haunting	Blair	Episode: "Ghost Confessions"
2018	Speechless	Dorky Friend #1	Episode: "N-E-- NEW Y-- YEAR'S E-- EVE"
2018	Kidding	Diego	Episode: "The New You"
2019	Labeled	Band Member #2	Television short
2020	Swiss and Lali Hijack Hollywood	Harlan	Main role
2021	Cruel Summer	Gideon	Episode: "As the Carny Gods Intended"
2022	Mythic Quest	Travor	3 episodes

=== Web ===
Year	Title	Role	Notes
2017	CollegeHumor Originals	Son	Episode: "IF Hand Turkeys Were Real"
2017	Vanoss Superhero School	Austin	3 episodes
