= Kristen Wiig =

American actress and comedian (born 1973)

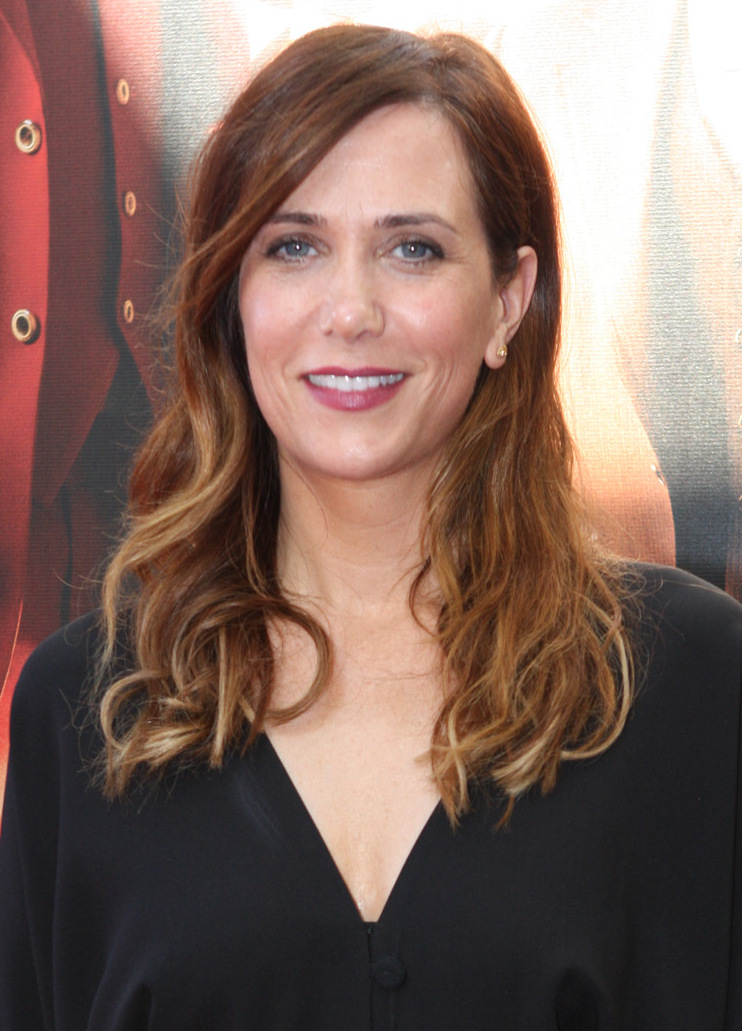
- Wiig at the Australian premiere of Anchorman 2 in 2013
- Born: Kristen Carroll Wiig; August 22, 1973 (age 53); Canandaigua, New York, U.S.
- Occupations: Actress; comedian; screenwriter; producer
- Years active: 2000–present
- Spouses: Hayes Hargrove (m. 2005; div. 2009) Avi Rothman (m. 2020)
- Children: 2
- Awards: Full list
- Website: kristenwiig.com

Kristen Carroll Wiig (/wɪɡ/; born August 22, 1973) is an American actress, comedian, screenwriter, and producer. First breaking through as a performer with the Los Angeles comedy troupe The Groundlings, Wiig achieved stardom in the late 2000s for her seven-season tenure on the NBC sketch comedy series Saturday Night Live (SNL) from 2005 to 2012.

During her tenure at SNL, Wiig received four nominations for the Primetime Emmy Award for Outstanding Supporting Actress in a Comedy Series. She also took on supporting roles in the comedy films Knocked Up (2007) and Paul (2011), and co-wrote and starred in Bridesmaids (2011), which was critically and commercially successful. The film earned her nominations for a Golden Globe Award for Best Actress and the Academy Award for Best Original Screenplay.

After leaving Saturday Night Live, Wiig appeared in the films The Secret Life of Walter Mitty (2013), The Skeleton Twins (2014), The Diary of a Teenage Girl (2015), The Martian (2015), Ghostbusters (2016), Downsizing (2017), Mother! (2017), and Wonder Woman 1984 (2020). She also voiced characters in the animated and live-action films Ice Age: Dawn of the Dinosaurs (2009), the How to Train Your Dragon (2010–2019), and Despicable Me (2010–present) franchises, Sausage Party (2016), and Masters of the Universe (2026). Wiig was nominated for a Primetime Emmy Award for Outstanding Lead Actress for her role in the comedy miniseries The Spoils of Babylon (2014) and for a Primetime Emmy Award for Outstanding Lead Actress in a Comedy Series for her role in the comedy-drama series Palm Royale (2024). Time named Wiig as one of the 100 most influential people in the world in both 2012 and 2025.

== Early life ==
Kristen Carroll Wiig was born on August 22, 1973, in Canandaigua, New York. Her father is Jon Arne Joseph Wiig, who ran a lake marina in Western New York, and her mother, Laurie Day (née Johnston), is an artist. She has an older brother Erik. Her father has Norwegian and Irish ancestry, and her mother, English and Scottish. The name Wiig comes from the area of Vik in Sogn og Fjordane in Norway. Kristen's paternal grandfather, Gunnar Ove Wiig, emigrated from Norway to the United States as a child and grew up in Rochester, New York, where he was an accomplished broadcaster for the Rochester Red Wings baseball team, and later became an executive at WHEC radio, WHEC-TV, and WROC-TV.

Wiig moved with her family to Lancaster, Pennsylvania at the age of three, and attended Nitrauer Elementary School and Manheim Township Middle School until eighth grade. When she was 13, she and her family returned to Rochester where she attended Allendale Columbia School for ninth and tenth grades and graduated from Brighton High School.

Wiig attended Roanoke College, but soon returned to Rochester. She attended community college and embarked on a three-month outdoor-living program. She had no performing ambitions at the time. She then attended the University of Arizona, majoring in art. When she took an acting class to fulfill a course requirement, the teacher suggested she continue to act. She was hired by a plastic surgery clinic to draw postsurgery bodies, but the day before the job began, in a bookstore she spoke with a psychic who said she should be acting and writing in Los Angeles, so she decided to move to Los Angeles to pursue an acting career.

== Career ==
=== SNL and early film roles (2000–2010) ===
Wiig relocated to Los Angeles to act while working odd jobs to support herself. She performed with Empty Stage Comedy Theatre and The Groundlings. She felt improvisation was a better fit than acting, and being a part of the comedy group improved her skills. In 2003, she appeared in Spike TV's The Joe Schmo Show, a spoof of reality television, in which she portrayed Dr. Pat, a quack marriage counselor. She auditioned for Mad TV. While at The Groundlings, Wiig's manager encouraged her to submit an audition tape to Saturday Night Live. She played the Target Lady on part of her audition tape. She debuted on SNL shortly into season 31, on November 12, 2005. She survived an SNL budget cut and became a full cast member at the beginning of season 32 in 2006.

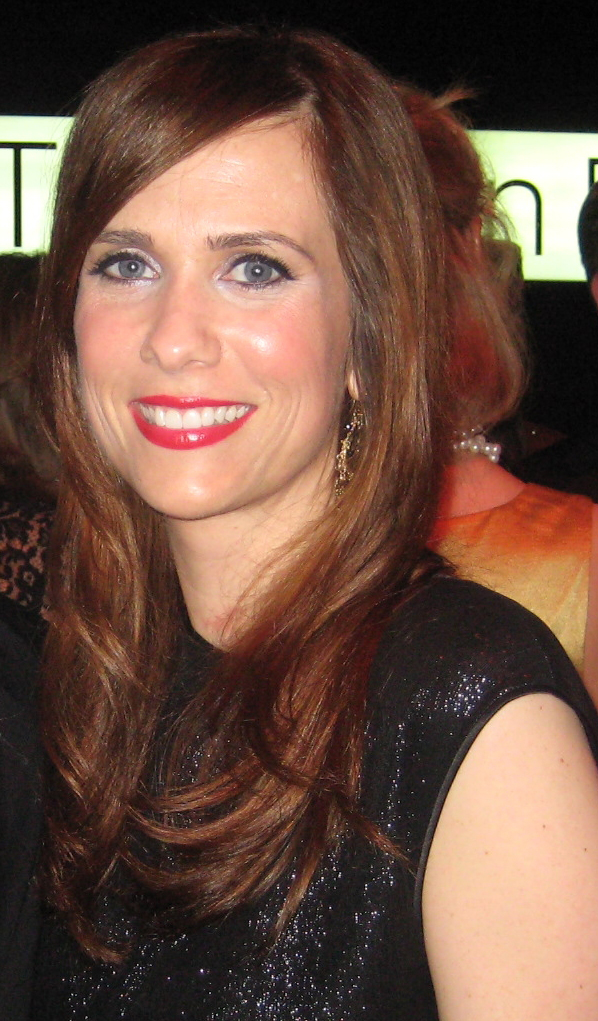
Wiig at an event for the 2008 Time 100

She was nominated for four Primetime Emmy Awards for Outstanding Supporting Actress in a Comedy Series for her work on SNL (2009 to 2012). Wiig headlined the 2009 Christmas special SNL Presents: A Very Gilly Christmas, featuring new sketches with her character Gilly and highlights of older SNL clips. She was featured in Entertainment Weekly's list of 15 Great Performances for her various impersonations on SNL (December 2008) and in EW's list of the 25 Funniest Women in Hollywood (April 2009). She voiced Lola Bunny in the series The Looney Tunes Show from 2011 to 2014.

Wiig made her film debut in the 2006 Christmas film Unaccompanied Minors, and appeared in Judd Apatow's 2007 comedy Knocked Up as a passive-aggressive assistant. She also performed in Jake Kasdan's Walk Hard, another Apatow-produced film. Between 2008 and 2010, she had supporting roles in several studio comedies which had various degrees of success. She made a cameo appearance as Bear Trainer Girl in the 2008 comedy Semi-Pro, reuniting with SNL alum Will Ferrell. She played a yoga instructor in Forgetting Sarah Marshall and a self-involved surgeon in David Koepp's Ghost Town.

Wiig co-starred in Greg Mottola's 2009 coming-of-age dramedy Adventureland, voiced a beaver mom in the animated adventure film Ice Age: Dawn of the Dinosaurs, played a roller derby competitor in Whip It (Drew Barrymore's directorial debut) and appeared as the wife of a flavoring-extracts company owner in Mike Judge's Extract. She had a brief role in Andrew Jarecki's 2010 drama All Good Things, starred opposite Will Forte and Ryan Phillippe in MacGruber, and voiced two big-budget animated films, Despicable Me and How to Train Your Dragon, that kicked off two highly profitable film franchises.

=== Breakthrough (2011–2016) ===
Wiig's career had a turning point in 2011. The comedy Bridesmaids, which she wrote with fellow Groundlings performer Annie Mumolo, was released that spring by Universal Pictures to critical acclaim, making US$167 million in North America and US$280 million worldwide. In her top-billed role, she played a single woman suffering a series of misfortunes after being asked to be her best friend's maid of honor. The New York Times wrote: "A lanky-limbed blonde who evokes Meg Ryan stretched along Olive Oyl lines, Ms. Wiig keeps her features jumping and sometimes bunching. She's a funny, pretty woman, but she's also a comedian, and she's wonderfully confident about playing not nice ... Ms. Wiig, a longtime cast member of Saturday Night Live, and Ms. Mumolo, a veteran of the Los Angeles comedy troupe the Groundlings, know what female moviegoers want: honest laughs with, and not solely about, women". For her work in the film, Wiig was nominated for the Golden Globe Award for Best Actress – Motion Picture Comedy or Musical and the Academy Award for Best Original Screenplay. Her last 2011 film was the romantic comedy Friends with Kids, where she played one half of a sex-obsessed couple, opposite Bridesmaids collaborator Maya Rudolph. It received positive reviews, who deemed it "sharp, shrewd, and funny", and was a success in limited release.

In the 2010s, Wiig was a prominent figure in Hollywood, acting in leading and supporting roles. The little-seen dramedy Revenge for Jolly!, which premiered at the Tribeca Film Festival, was her first 2012 release. In the comedy Girl Most Likely, she headlined opposite Annette Bening as a playwright who stages a suicide in an attempt to win back her ex, only to wind up in the custody of her gambling-addict mother. Rotten Tomatoes gave it a 20% rating based on 85 reviews, with the site's consensus: "Largely witless and disappointingly dull, Girl Most Likely strands the gifted Kristen Wiig in a blandly hollow foray into scattershot sitcom territory."

Her final performance as a cast member on Saturday Night Live was season 37, episode 22, which aired on May 19, 2012 and was hosted by Mick Jagger. The closing celebration of her time on the show included SNL alumni Amy Poehler, Chris Kattan, Chris Parnell, Will Forte, and Rachel Dratch, as well as Steve Martin and Jon Hamm. She has since returned to host the program several times.

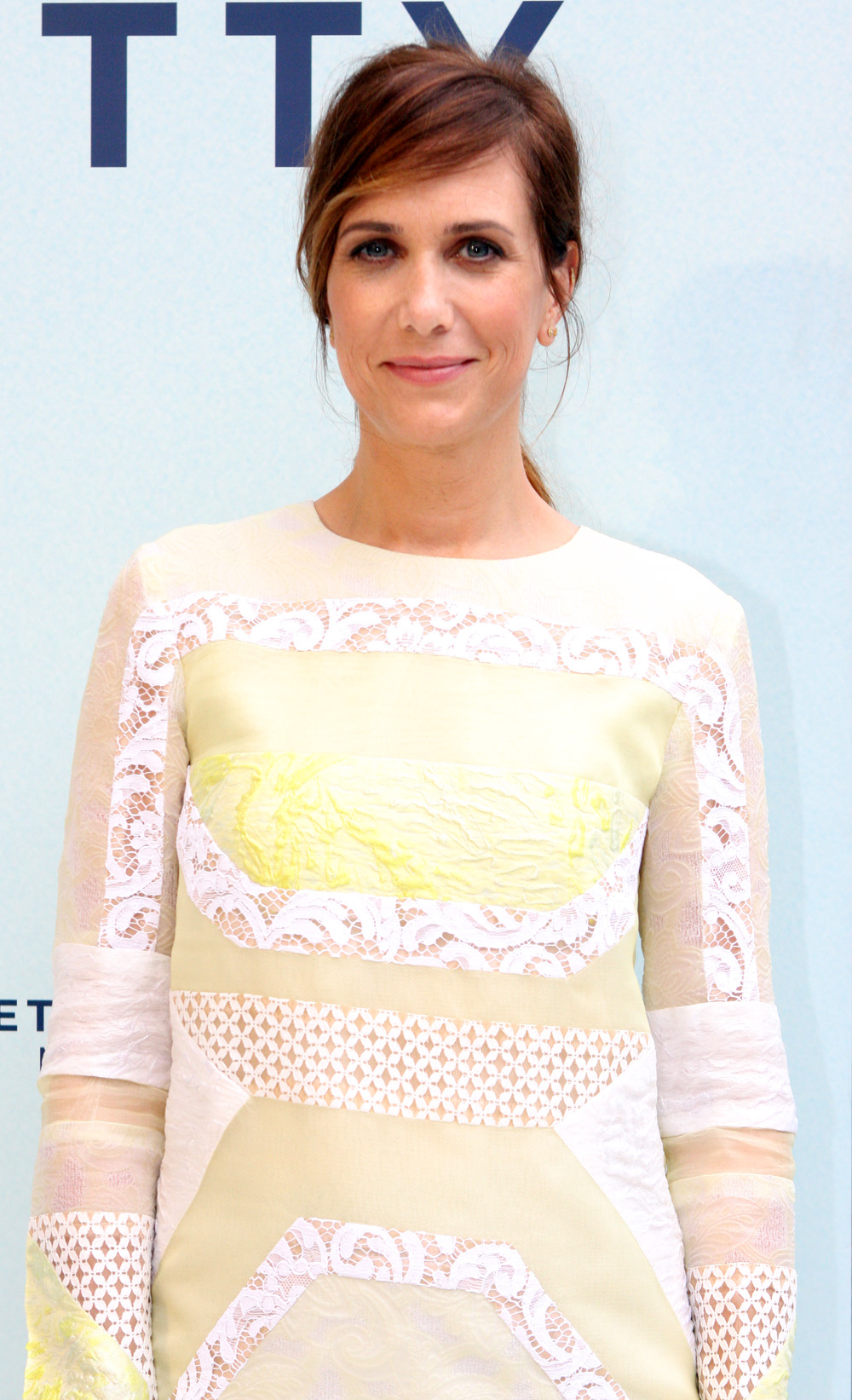
Wiig at the Sydney premiere of The Secret Life of Walter Mitty in 2013

Wiig again provided her voice for Despicable Me 2, released on June 5, 2013, and for the character of Sexy Kitten in the critically acclaimed sci-fi romantic drama Her (2013). She portrayed the love interest and co-worker of the titular character in the adventure dramedy The Secret Life of Walter Mitty (also 2013), alongside Ben Stiller and Sean Penn; it polarized critics and was a moderate success. The New York Daily News praised Stiller and Wiig's "sweet, mellow chemistry", and Peter Travers of Rolling Stone found her to be "lovely, low-key" in the film, which he described as "uniquely funny and unexpectedly tender". Her other 2013 film was the comedy sequel Anchorman 2: The Legend Continues, in which she teamed with frequent collaborators Will Ferrell and Steve Carell. With Ferrell, she subsequently starred in the six-episode miniseries The Spoils of Babylon (2014), and its fellow-up The Spoils Before Dying (2015) as well as the Lifetime television movie A Deadly Adoption (2015). Wiig was nominated for a Primetime Emmy Award for Outstanding Lead Actress in a Miniseries or a Movie for her role in The Spoils of Babylon.

Hateship, Loveship (2014), her next theatrically released production, was based on the 2001 short story "Hateship, Friendship, Courtship, Loveship, Marriage" by Alice Munro. In it, she played a woman who must move to a new town to begin work as a housekeeper for an elderly man who needs help keeping house. Critics asserted that Wiig's "vibrant performance is almost worth the price of admission—and it has to be, because Hateship Loveship doesn't have much else going for it", as part of a mixed overall response. In 2014, she also reprised her role in How to Train Your Dragon 2, and starred with Bill Hader in Craig Johnson's dramedy The Skeleton Twins, as estranged twins reuniting with the possibility of mending their relationship. The Skeleton Twins was an arthouse success, with the Globe and Mail remarking: "Johnson's unfussy direction serves as a fine showcase for the two SNL veterans to demonstrate how their comic shorthand plays equally well in a slightly darker register".

For singer-songwriter Sia's performance of her 2014 single "Chandelier" at the 2015 Grammy Awards, Wiig danced alongside child dancer Maddie Ziegler.

In 2015, the dramedy Welcome to Me was released in selected theaters to a positive critical response. In it, Wiig played a multi-millionaire with borderline personality disorder who uses her newfound wealth to write and star in an autobiographical talk show. Rotten Tomatoes' consensus was: "A transfixing central performance by Kristen Wiig holds Welcome to Me together and compensates for its uneven stretches." In her next film, another dramedy titled The Diary of a Teenage Girl, Wiig starred as a woman whose boyfriend starts a sexual relationship with her daughter. Like Welcome to Me, the film received a limited theatrical release and was favorably received by critics. In 2015, she also played the director of media relations for NASA in the successful sci-fi drama The Martian, opposite Matt Damon, and starred as a family practitioner who is more interested in having a baby than having a boyfriend in the black comedy Nasty Baby, directed by Chilean filmmaker Sebastián Silva.

Wiig had four notable roles in 2016, including the comedy Zoolander 2 (2016), where she took on the role of a villain and the "Queen of Haute Couture", alongside Ben Stiller, Owen Wilson, and Will Ferrell. Ghostbusters featured Wiig as an author who bands with other paranormal enthusiasts to stop an otherworldly threat. She also voiced a hot dog bun in the animated comedy Sausage Party, and played a woman planning a robbery in Masterminds.

=== Later roles (2017–present) ===
In 2017, Wiig provided her voice for Despicable Me 3 and appeared in the film Downsizing, reuniting with Damon. She was scheduled to star in and executive produce an Apple comedy series with Reese Witherspoon, but later withdrew from the project. In 2020, she played the villain Cheetah in Wonder Woman 1984.

Wiig and Annie Mumolo co-wrote and co-starred in the 2021 comedy Barb and Star Go to Vista Del Mar, which received positive reviews. Also in 2021, she played Aunt Carlotta in the Netflix film A Boy Called Christmas. In 2024, she produced and starred in Palm Royale.

== Personal life ==
Wiig was married to actor Hayes Hargrove from 2005 to 2009, and dated The Strokes drummer Fabrizio Moretti from 2011 to 2013.

In 2019, after three years of dating, she became engaged to actor Avi Rothman. In January 2020, they became the parents of twins, a son and daughter, via surrogacy. In February 2021, Wiig confirmed that she and Rothman had married.

In 2017, Wiig purchased Case Study House No. 10 in Pasadena, California. She sold the historic structure to fellow actress Lily Collins in 2022 and moved into a new home a few blocks away, also in Pasadena.

== Filmography ==
=== Film ===
Key
†	Denotes films that have not yet been released

Kristen Wiig film work
Year	Title	Role	Notes
2000	Carnata	Party Parent	Short film
2003	Melvin Goes to Dinner	Extra	
2004	My Life, Inc.	Sharon Flinder	
2004	June	Funky Venice Friendette	
2004	Life, Death, and Mini-Golf	Debbie	
2006	Unaccompanied Minors	Carole Malone	
2006	The Enigma with a Stigma	Tux Shop Employee	
2007	Knocked Up	Jill	
2007	Meet Bill	Jane Whitman	
2007	The Brothers Solomon	Janine Rice	
2007	Walk Hard: The Dewey Cox Story	Edith Cox	
2008	Semi-Pro	Bear Handler	
2008	Forgetting Sarah Marshall	Yoga Instructor	
2008	Pretty Bird	Mandy Riddle	
2008	Ghost Town	Bertram's self-involved Surgeon	
2009	Adventureland	Paulette	
2009	Ice Age: Dawn of the Dinosaurs	Pudgy Beaver Mom	Voice
2009	Whip It	Maggie Mayhem	
2009	Extract	Suzie Reynolds	
2010	How to Train Your Dragon	Ruffnut Thorston	Voice
2010	Legend of the Boneknapper Dragon	Ruffnut Thorston	Voice, short film
2010	Date Night	Haley Sullivan	
2010	MacGruber	Vicki St. Elmo	
2010	Despicable Me	Miss Hattie	Voice
2010	All Good Things	Lauren Fleck	
2011	Paul	Ruth Buggs	
2011	Bridesmaids	Annie Walker	Also writer
2011	Friends with Kids	Missy	
2011	Gift of the Night Fury	Ruffnut Thorston	Voice, short film
2012	Revenge for Jolly!	Angela	
2012	Girl Most Likely	Imogene Duncan	Also executive producer
2013	Despicable Me 2	Agent Lucy Wilde	Voice
2013	Her	SexyKitten	Voice
2013	The Secret Life of Walter Mitty	Cheryl Melhoff	
2013	Anchorman 2: The Legend Continues	Chani Lastnamé	
2013	Hateship, Loveship	Johanna Parry	
2014	The Skeleton Twins	Maggie Dean	
2014	How to Train Your Dragon 2	Ruffnut Thorston	Voice
2014	Welcome to Me	Alice Klieg	Also producer
2015	The Diary of a Teenage Girl	Charlotte Worthington	
2015	Nasty Baby	Polly	
2015	A Deadly Adoption	Sarah Benson	Television film
2015	The Martian	Annie Montrose	
2016	Zoolander 2	Alexanya Atoz / Katinka	
2016	Ghostbusters	Dr. Erin Gilbert	
2016	Sausage Party	Brenda	Voice
2016	Masterminds	Kelly Campbell	
2016	Lightningface	Katherine	Voice, short film
2017	Despicable Me 3	Agent Lucy Wilde	Voice
2017	Downsizing	Audrey Safranek	
2017	Mother!	Herald	
2019	How to Train Your Dragon: The Hidden World	Ruffnut Thorston	Voice
2019	Where'd You Go, Bernadette	Audrey Griffin	
2020	Wonder Woman 1984	Barbara Ann Minerva / Cheetah	
2021	Barb and Star Go to Vista Del Mar	Star / Sharon Gordon Fisherman	Also writer and producer
2021	A Boy Called Christmas	Aunt Carlotta	
2024	Despicable Me 4	Agent Lucy Wilde	Voice
2025	Gabby's Dollhouse: The Movie	Vera	Also voice
2026	Lorne	Herself	Documentary film
2026	Masters of the Universe	Roboto	Voice
TBA	Cut Off †	Bijou Bismol	Post-production

=== Television ===
Kristen Wiig television works
Year	Title	Role	Notes
2003	The Joe Schmo Show	Dr. Pat	9 episodes
2004	I'm with Her	Kristy	Episode: "The Heartbreak Kid"
2004	The Drew Carey Show	Sandy	Episode: "House of the Rising Son-in-Law"
2005–12	Saturday Night Live	Herself/Various	135 episodes
2007	30 Rock	Candace Van der Shark	Episode: "Somebody to Love"
2009	Flight of the Conchords	Brahbrah	Episode: "Love Is a Weapon of Choice"
2009–10	Bored to Death	Jennifer Gladwell	3 episodes
2010	Ugly Americans	Tristan	Voice, episode: "So, You Want to Be a Vampire?"
2010	The Cleveland Show	Mrs. Stapleton	Voice, episode: "The Curious Case of Jr. Working at The Stool"
2011–14	The Looney Tunes Show	Lola Bunny	Voice, 25 episodes
2011	The Simpsons	Calliope Juniper	Voice, episode: "Flaming Moe"
2011	SpongeBob SquarePants	Madame Hag Fish	Voice, episode: "The Curse of the Hex"
2012	Portlandia	Gathy	Episode: "Cat Nap"
2013	The Simpsons	Annie Crawford	Voice, episode: "Homerland"
2013–24	Saturday Night Live	Herself (host)	5 episodes
2013	Arrested Development	Young Lucille Bluth	7 episodes
2013	Drunk History	Patty Hearst	Episode: "San Francisco"
2014	The Spoils of Babylon	Cynthia Morehouse	6 episodes
2015	The Spoils Before Dying	Delores O'Dell	6 episodes
2015	Wet Hot American Summer: First Day of Camp	Courtney	3 episodes
2017	The Last Man on Earth	Pamela Brinton	5 episodes
2017	Wet Hot American Summer: Ten Years Later	Courtney	Episode: "Tigerclaw"
2017–18	Nobodies	Herself	2 episodes
2017–25	Big Mouth	Jessi's vulva / Beatrice	Voice, 6 episodes
2018	The Royal Wedding Live with Cord & Tish!	Sir Albert Langham-Kingsley	HBO event coverage
2019–21	Bless the Harts	Jenny Hart, Maykay Bueller	Voice, 34 episodes
2021	MacGruber	Vicki St. Elmo	8 episodes
2024–26	Palm Royale	Maxine Dellacorte-Simmons and Mirabelle	Main role
2024	Sausage Party: Foodtopia	Brenda	Voice, 8 episodes

=== Music videos ===
Year	Artist(s)	Title
2009	The Lonely Island	"Like a Boss"
2020	Gal Gadot & Friends	"Imagine"

=== Producer ===
Kristen Wiig production work
Year	Title	Role	Notes
2022	Big Gold Brick	Executive producer	

== Discography ==
Kristen Wiig discography
Song	Year	Artist(s)	Album
"President's Day"	2012	Kristen Wiig (as Lola Bunny)	Songs from The Looney Tunes Show
"We Are in love"	2012	Jeff Bergman (as Bugs Bunny), Kristen Wiig (as Lola Bunny)	Songs from The Looney Tunes Show
"You've Got the Look"	2013	The Lonely Island, Hugh Jackman, Kristen Wiig	The Wack Album
"I'm Ready"	2013	Rodrigo Amarante, Kristen Wiig (backing vocals)	Cavalo
"Tardei"	2013	Rodrigo Amarante, Kristen Wiig (backing vocals)	Cavalo
"Space Oddity (Mitty Mix)"	2013	David Bowie, Kristen Wiig	The Secret Life of Walter Mitty (Music From and Inspired By the Motion Picture)
"Can We Stay with You?"	2014	Fred Armisen, Jim Carrey, Kristen Wiig (as Taste of New York)	Non-album single
"The Great Beyond"	2016	Kristen Wiig and the Sausage Party cast	Sausage Party (Original Motion Picture Soundtrack)
"The Great Beyond Around the World"	2016	Kristen Wiig and the Sausage Party cast	Sausage Party (Original Motion Picture Soundtrack)
"Palm Vista Hotel"	2021	Kristen Wiig, Annie Mumolo and the Barb and Star cast	Barb and Star Go to Vista Del Mar (Original Motion Picture Soundtrack)

=== Songwriting credits ===
Kristen Wiig songwriting
Year	Artist(s)	Album	Song	Co-written with
2021	Kristen Wiig, Annie Mumolo and the Barb and Star cast	Barb and Star Go to Vista Del Mar (Original Motion Picture Soundtrack)	"Palm Vista Hotel"	Andrew Feltenstein, Annie Mumolo, Dana Nielson, Danny Dunlap, Jeremy Balliger, John Nau
2021	Jamie Dornan, Amy Keys	Barb and Star Go to Vista Del Mar (Original Motion Picture Soundtrack)	"Edgar's Prayer"	Andrew Feltenstein, Annie Mumolo, Dana Nielson, Danny Dunlap, Jeremy Balliger, John Nau
2021	Richard Cheese	Barb and Star Go to Vista Del Mar (Original Motion Picture Soundtrack)	"I Love Boobies"	Andrew Feltenstein, Annie Mumolo, John Nau, Mark Jonathan Davis, Noel Melanio
2021	Richard Cheese	Barb and Star Go to Vista Del Mar (Original Motion Picture Soundtrack)	"My Friends From High School Recently Passed"	Andrew Feltenstein, Annie Mumolo, John Nau
2021	Richard Cheese	Barb and Star Go to Vista Del Mar (Original Motion Picture Soundtrack)	"I Love Boobies (Reprise) / Short Break"	Andrew Feltenstein, Annie Mumolo, John Nau, Mark Jonathan Davis, Noel Melanio
2021	Richard Cheese	Barb and Star Go to Vista Del Mar (Original Motion Picture Soundtrack)	"I Love Boobies (Extended Version)"	Andrew Feltenstein, Annie Mumolo, John Nau, Mark Jonathan Davis, Noel Melanio
2024	Kristen Wiig	Will & Harper	"Harper and Will Go West"	Sean Douglas, Josh Greenbaum

== Awards and nominations ==
- She was named one of PETA's Sexiest Vegetarian Celebrities of 2011.
- She is part of Time's 2012 list of The 100 Most Influential People in the World.
