= The Family Plan 2 =

- Release poster
- Directed by: Simon Cellan Jones
- Written by: David Coggeshall
- Based on: Characters by David Coggeshall
- Produced by: Mark Wahlberg; David Ellison; Dana Goldberg; Don Granger; Stephen Levinson; John G. Scotti
- Starring: Mark Wahlberg; Michelle Monaghan; Zoe Colletti; Van Crosby; Sidse Babett Knudsen; Kit Harington
- Cinematography: Michael Burgess
- Edited by: Yan Miles; Pani Scott
- Music by: Kevin Matley
- Production companies: Apple Studios; Skydance Media; Municipal Pictures
- Distributed by: Apple TV
- Release date: November 21, 2025
- Running time: 107 minutes
- Country: United States
- Language: English

The Family Plan 2 is a 2025 American action comedy film and a sequel to the 2023 film The Family Plan with Mark Wahlberg, Michelle Monaghan, Zoe Colletti, and Van Crosby reprising their roles and with Kit Harington also starring. The film is directed by Simon Cellan Jones and written by David Coggeshall. It was produced by Apple Studios and distributed on Apple TV on November 21, 2025. Like its predecessor, it received negative reviews from critics.

== Plot ==
Three years after Dan Morgan defeated his father, McCaffrey, and imprisoned him, Dan now runs his own private security firm; his wife, Jessica, is a triathlete coach, and Nina is studying abroad in London. Jessica was offered a promotion to be a coach at Ohio State University, which means the family will have to move to Ohio. Dan feels like his family is slowly moving apart, now that Kyle is 18.

Since Nina cannot return home for Christmas, Dan takes his family to see Nina, using a job task to check the bank's security system. There, they find Nina with a new boyfriend, Omar, who displeases Dan. At the bank, Dan meets Finn Clarke, who hired him for an assessment. Suspicious, Dan suspects Finn wants him to perform a bank heist disguised as an inspection to steal a deposit box with a digital key. Dan also learns Finn is actually his younger half-brother, the child of the maid his father had an affair with in Ireland. Finn threatens to kill his family if Dan does not cooperate. They escape with Dan holding Finn at gunpoint, and Jessica, kidnapped by Finn's men, is released with a gun taped to her hand, making them fugitives. Dan had stolen the digital key, and Finn chases after them.

Pursued by Finn and the authorities, Dan ditches the digital key to throw off Finn while he and Jessica escape with their kids and Omar. Dan tells them he didn't know Finn was his brother, and Finn has the digital key that gives him access to his late father's computer servers, which hold endless funds, his assassins, and a highly advanced surveillance network, including his past life as Sean McCaffrey. Dan takes the family to Paris to his old childhood home, which is also the base of his father's network, intending to destroy it. Finn arrives at the house under former butler Vikram's care and activates the network.

In Paris, the Morgans seek help from Svetlana Romanova, Dan's former Russian intelligence contact, and hide at her place. Dan and Finn meet at a museum; Dan tries to reason with Finn. Finn admits he hates Dan because he was his father's favorite, and McCaffrey knew Finn was his son but did not acknowledge him, abandoning him. Finn wants their late father's inheritance, so Dan warns him to stay away from his family. Finn then places a bounty and hires assassins to kill Dan.

After spending a day as a family together, Svetlana drugs Dan to collect the bounty, but she shows sympathy for him and his family. She warns them that assassins are coming to kill them, and the Morgans and Omar escape from the assassins in a car chase. Dan devises a plan to get inside his home and sabotage the network. Dan and Omar will infiltrate through the rooftops and disable the security so Dan can get inside and use a flash drive created by Kyle to infect the servers and destroy the network while Nina and some of her colleagues start a protest outside to distract Finn and Jessica stays with Kyle to upload the virus.

Finn remembers where Dan used to secretly gain entry and captures Dan, but Vikram, loyal to Dan because he was his father's favorite, lets him escape. Dan fights and defeats the assassins. Jessica connects the flash drive, and Kyle uploads a virus that destroys Finn's servers and funds. Furious, Finn fights Dan, but Dan defeats and subdues him. Jessica and the Morgans defeat the remaining assassins. French police arrest the Morgans and Finn, but Omar and his father, the Secretary General of Interpol, arrive to clear their charges. 11 months later, the Morgans have moved to Columbus, Ohio, and Dan finally acknowledges Omar as a part of the family. Kyle has moved out to college, and Nina has started a new green company. Dan visits Finn in prison to make amends by giving him a new coat and playing cards with him.

== Cast ==
- Mark Wahlberg as Dan Morgan / Sean McCaffrey, a former car salesman and covert assassin who now runs a security firm.
- Michelle Monaghan as Jessica Morgan, Dan's wife who was a former decathlete
- Zoe Colletti as Nina Morgan, Dan and Jessica's daughter and eldest child
- Van Crosby as Kyle Morgan, Dan and Jessica's first son and middle child, who has achieved niche fame as a skilled gamer called "Kylleboi"
- Kit Harington as Finn Clarke, Dan's half-brother
- Sidse Babett Knudsen as Svetlana Romanova
- Peter and Theodore Lindsey as Max Morgan, Dan and Jessica's second son and youngest child
- Sanjeev Bhaskar as Vikram, a butler
- Reda Elazouar as Omar, Nina's boyfriend
- Daniel de Bourg as Jules

== Production ==
In October 2024, it was revealed that a sequel to The Family Plan (2023) was in development, with Simon Cellan Jones directing and David Coggeshall writing the screenplay. Mark Wahlberg, Michelle Monaghan, Zoe Colletti, and Van Crosby reprise their roles from the first film. In December, Kit Harington and Reda Elazouar joined the cast of the film.

Principal photography began in January 2025, and was expected to last until March of that year. Scenes were additionally shot at Warner Bros. Studios, Leavesden and Shepperton Studios.

== Release ==
The Family Plan 2 was released on Apple TV on November 21, 2025.

== Reception ==
On the review aggregator website Rotten Tomatoes, 28% of 29 critics' reviews are positive, with an average rating of 4.5/10. The website's consensus reads: "Despite the best laid plans, this hokey sequel doesn't improve much upon its predecessor due to a forgettable plot and routine execution." Metacritic, which uses a weighted average, assigned the film a score of 38 out of 100, based on 8 critics, indicating "generally unfavorable" reviews.
