= Scary Stories to Tell in the Dark (film) =

2019 film by André Øvredal

- Theatrical release poster
- Directed by: André Øvredal
- Screenplay by: Dan Hageman; Kevin Hageman
- Story by: Guillermo del Toro; Patrick Melton; Marcus Dunstan
- Based on: Scary Stories to Tell in the Dark by Alvin Schwartz
- Produced by: Guillermo del Toro; Sean Daniel; Jason F. Brown; J. Miles Dale; Elizabeth Grave
- Starring: Zoe Colletti; Michael Garza; Gabriel Rush; Austin Zajur; Natalie Ganzhorn; Austin Abrams; Dean Norris; Gil Bellows; Lorraine Toussaint
- Cinematography: Roman Osin
- Edited by: Patrick Larsgaard
- Music by: Marco Beltrami; Anna Drubich
- Production companies: CBS Films; Entertainment One Films; Rolling Hills; Starlight Media; Hivemind; 1212 Entertainment; Double Dare You
- Distributed by: Lionsgate Films (United States); Entertainment One Films (Canada); Diamond Films (Mexico)
- Release dates: August 9, 2019 (United States and Canada); August 15, 2019 (Mexico)
- Running time: 107 minutes
- Countries: United States; Canada; Mexico
- Language: English
- Budget: $25–28 million
- Box office: $104.5 million

Scary Stories to Tell in the Dark is a 2019 supernatural horror film directed by André Øvredal, based on the children's book series of the same name by Alvin Schwartz. The screenplay was adapted by the Hageman Brothers, from a screen story by Guillermo del Toro (who also produced), as well as Patrick Melton and Marcus Dunstan. The film, an international co-production of the United States, Canada and Mexico, stars Zoe Colletti, Michael Garza, Gabriel Rush, Austin Zajur, Natalie Ganzhorn, Austin Abrams, Dean Norris, Gil Bellows, and Lorraine Toussaint.

In 2013, CBS Films acquired the rights to the book series from 1212 Entertainment, with the intent of producing it as a feature film. By January 2016, it was announced that del Toro would develop and potentially direct the project for CBS Films. Øvredal was later set to direct the film, with del Toro, Daniel, Brown, and Grave being among the producers. Principal photography began on August 27, 2018, and ended on November 1, 2018, in St. Thomas, Ontario, Canada.

Scary Stories to Tell in the Dark was theatrically released on August 9, 2019, in the United States by Lionsgate Films. The film received positive reviews from critics, with praise for its depictions of the horror features from its source material, and went on to gross $105 million at the box office, becoming a financial success. A sequel is in development.

== Plot ==
On Halloween night in 1968, in the fictional Pennsylvania town of Mill Valley, teenagers Stella, Auggie, Chuck, and newcomer Ramón visit the supposedly haunted home of the Bellows family. Inside a secret room, they find a book of horror stories written by Sarah Bellows, the family's daughter. Ostracized for her albinism and accused of witchcraft when the town's children began to die mysteriously, she allegedly died by suicide in 1898. The local bully, Tommy, and Ruth, Chuck's sister, lock the group inside Sarah's room. After Tommy leaves, the lock is mysteriously opened, and Stella takes Sarah's storybook home.

Back home, Stella finds a new story called "Harold", written in blood, on previously blank pages. In a nearby cornfield, an inebriated Tommy is stalked by the titular Harold — his family's scarecrow. Harold stabs Tommy in the back with a pitchfork, causing him to vomit hay and undergo a violent transformation in which hay comes out of the wounds and various parts of his body. The next day, Tommy is reported missing. Stella and Ramon find Harold dressed in Tommy's clothes. Stella proposes that Harold is actually Tommy, and that the book’s story became real, and returns the book to the Bellows house.

Ramon comes by Stella’s home and, as they are talking, Stella realizes Ramon is holding the book which has reappeared in her room. Stella and Ramón watch in shock as a story titled "The Big Toe" begins to write itself in the storybook, and identifies Auggie as the protagonist. Auggie unknowingly eats stew containing the big toe of a corpse. Auggie is then dragged under his bed by the corpse and disappears. Alarmed, the remaining friends try fruitlessly to destroy the book. Researching the Bellows, they learn that the live-in maid Sylvia Baptiste was fired after teaching Sarah witchcraft, and the rest of the family all disappeared after Sarah's suicide. However, all their names can be found in the stories, suggesting the book—or Sarah—killed them.

Another new story called "The Red Spot" appears with Ruth as the protagonist. Ruth is getting her makeup ready for the school play, and starts poking at a swollen spider bite on her cheek. The large swollen red spot on her face explodes and hundreds of tiny spiders crawl out of the wound. Ruth is rescued but is traumatized by the incident and hospitalized.

The group's investigation takes them to the elderly Lou-Lou Baptiste, Sylvia Baptiste's daughter. They learn that Sarah did not die in the Bellows' house. Instead, she hanged herself in the hospital where her older brother, Dr. Ephraim Bellows, was her supervising doctor.

At the hospital, the group discover recordings that reveal Sarah's brother had ruthlessly performed electroshock therapy on her to get her to confess to killing the children. Their deaths were actually caused by the family's paper mill poisoning the town's water with mercury, so they framed Sarah when the town got suspicious. Chuck, while trying to evade hospital security, accidentally triggers an alarm which floods the hallways in the same red light from his nightmares. In the recording, Sarah begins to narrate a new story called "The Dream", with Chuck as the main character. Chuck is then attacked and cornered by the Pale Lady, a phantom from his nightmares, who absorbs him.

Stella and Ramón are arrested for trespassing by Police Chief Turner, who reveals that Ramón is a Vietnam War draft dodger. Ramón reveals his brother enlisted and his dead body was returned to them in pieces. The book starts a new story called "Me Tie Dough-ty Walker". A head falls down the chimney and more body parts follow. Ramón realizes that the next creature is called the Jangly Man, a monster that frightened him as a child. The Jangly Man kills Turner after shouting his titular catchphrase while Ramón and Stella flee to the Bellows' house for answers. Stella is taken back in time while Ramón tries to evade the Jangly Man. Living out Sarah's experience of abuse, Stella promises Sarah that she will tell the truth of her innocence if she stops harming people. Stella writes down the true story with her blood, and Sarah and all of her monsters vanish.

Stella writes the truth about Sarah's life in the papers, keeping her promise. While Stella receives acclaim for the story, not everyone believes her. Ramón accepts his enlistment and shares an emotional goodbye with Stella before he leaves for the war. With Ruth having recovered, Stella starts looking for a way to rescue Chuck and Auggie who had been taken by the monsters.

== Cast ==
- Zoe Colletti as Stella Nicholls
- Michael Garza as Ramón Morales
- Gabriel Rush as August "Auggie" Hilderbrandt
- Austin Zajur as Charlie "Chuck" Steinberg
- Natalie Ganzhorn as Ruth "Ruthie" Steinberg
- Austin Abrams as Tommy Milner
- Dean Norris as Roy Nicholls
- Gil Bellows as Police Chief Turner
- Lorraine Toussaint as Louise "Lou Lou" Baptiste
  - Ajanae Stephenson as Young Louise Baptiste
- Kathleen Pollard as Sarah Bellows
- Deborah Pollitt as Mrs. Steinberg
- Victoria Fodor as Mrs. Milner
- Marie Ward as Mrs. Hilderbrandt
- Mark Steger as:
  - Harold the Scarecrow
  - The Pale Lady
- Javier Botet as the "Big Toe" corpse
- Troy James as the Jangly Man
- Kyle Labine as Deputy Hobbs
- Rodrigo Fernandez-Stoll as the drive-in manager

== Production ==
In 2013, CBS Films acquired the rights to the Alvin Schwartz children's book series Scary Stories to Tell in the Dark from 1212 Entertainment, with the intent of producing it as a potential feature film. It was announced in 2014 that writer John August had been set to pen a film version.

On January 14, 2016, it was announced that Guillermo del Toro would develop the film, as well as possibly direct, and that he would also produce along with Sean Daniel, Jason Brown, and Elizabeth Grave, with Roberto Grande and Joshua Long executive producing. In February 2016, CBS Films hired screenwriting brothers duo Dan and Kevin Hageman to polish the draft written by August. In December 2017, it was reported that André Øvredal would direct the film. The Hagemans received final screenplay credit, with del Toro, Patrick Melton, and Marcus Dunstan receiving "story by" credit. CBS Films co-financed with Entertainment One.

In August 2018, Zoe Colletti, Michael Garza, Austin Abrams, Gabriel Rush, Austin Zajur, and Natalie Ganzhorn joined the cast. In September 2018, Dean Norris, Gil Bellows, Lorraine Toussaint, and Javier Botet were added as well. Principal photography commenced on August 27, 2018, and ended on November 1, 2018, in Hamilton, Ontario.

In July 2019, at San Diego Comic-Con, del Toro explained why Scary Stories to Tell in the Dark was not produced as an anthology film:

When we started talking about this about five years ago, I had to think about it ... Anthology films are always as bad as the worst story in them – they're never as good as the best story ... I remembered in Pan's Labyrinth, I created a book called the Book of Crossroads. I thought it could be great if we had a book that reads you, and it writes what you're most afraid of. Then the theme became stories we tell each other.

=== Music ===
The film features an original score by composers Marco Beltrami and Anna Drubich. In addition to the original music, period songs from the 60s are heard in the film, such as "Season of the Witch" by Donovan, which plays during the film's opening.

A cover of "Season of the Witch" by musician Lana Del Rey is heard in the closing credits to the film and was featured in a trailer for the film. While talking about his choice to have Del Rey sing the cover for the film, del Toro stated, "I have admired Lana's music for a while now and felt in my gut that she would run with 'Season of the Witch' – that she would use her alchemy to transform it. She is a great artist and has been an amazing partner with us in this adventure. It is an honor for me to have met her." Del Rey's version of the song was released for digital download and streaming on August 9, the same day as the film's premiere. Mirko Parlevliet of Vital Thrills praised the pairing of Del Rey's sound and the film's vintage aesthetic. Savannah Sicurella of Paste stated, "Del Rey managed to capture the prickly, macabre feeling of the popular Alvin Schwartz stories on which the film was based."

== Marketing ==
The first footage of the film premiered during Super Bowl LIII. The first trailer was released on March 28, 2019, and the second on June 3, 2019. On August 5, 2019, a third trailer was released, featuring a cover version of the Donovan song "Season of the Witch", by Lana Del Rey, performed for the film's soundtrack. All-in-all, the studio spent over $20 million promoting the film.

== Release ==
=== Theatrical ===
The film was theatrically released in the United States on August 9, 2019, by CBS Films via Lionsgate Films.

=== Home media ===
Scary Stories to Tell in the Dark was released in the US on digital download by Lionsgate Home Entertainment on October 22, 2019, and also on Ultra HD Blu-ray, Blu-ray, and DVD on November 5.

== Reception ==
=== Box office ===
Scary Stories to Tell in the Dark grossed $68.9 million in the United States and Canada, and $35.6 million in other territories, for a worldwide total of $104.5 million.

In the United States and Canada, Scary Stories to Tell in the Dark was released alongside The Kitchen, Dora and the Lost City of Gold, The Art of Racing in the Rain, and Brian Banks, and was projected to gross $15–17 million from 3,000 theaters in its opening weekend. The film made $8.8 million on its first day, including $2.33 million from Thursday night previews. It went on to debut to $20.8 million, finishing second, behind holdover Hobbs & Shaw. It dropped 52% in its second weekend to $10.1 million, finishing fifth.

=== Critical response ===
On the review aggregator website Rotten Tomatoes, the film holds an approval rating of 78% based on 235 reviews, with an average rating of 6.4/10. The site's critical consensus reads, "Like the bestselling series of books that inspired it, Scary Stories to Tell in the Dark opens a creepy gateway into horror for younger genre enthusiasts." Metacritic gave the film a weighted average score of 61 out of 100, based on 33 critics, indicating "generally favorable reviews". Audiences polled by CinemaScore gave the film an average grade of "C" on an A+ to F scale, while those at PostTrak gave it an average 3 out of 5 stars and a 53% "definite recommend".

Owen Gleiberman of Variety wrote that "the movie faithfully re-creates the peak moments of half a dozen of Schwartz' most popular stories", but "doesn't totally embrace the Gammell vision", referring to the infamy of the illustrations in the original book series. Ben Kenigsberg of The New York Times called the film "an agreeable bit of fan service".

Keith Uhlich of The Hollywood Reporter conversely termed it a "lackluster adaptation", adding that the monsters depicted in the film are "scary", though "they'd be much more so if they felt less like franchisable IP and more like fervent expressions of the ills of the eras on which the film aims to comment". William Bibbiani of Bloody Disgusting wrote that the film "often works very well for several, breathless minutes at a time. But in between those excellent scares there's a lot of filler, a lot of perfunctory plotting and a lot of mediocre character development." Alan Jacques of Limerick Post gave the film two points out of five and stated "This movie is definitely not meant for a pre-teen audience. There are one or two genuinely creepy moments that would leave your precious nippers sleeping with the lights on until they finish college. ... For a young audience coming to horror for the first time, this isn't a bad place to start, but for anyone with a real appreciation of the genre this might feel rather dull and unoriginal." In his review for The Verge, Noah Berlatsky stated "Scary Stories is remarkably insightful and sober in its assessment of the way stories control people, rather than the other way around. Quentin Tarantino's Once Upon a Time in Hollywood was supposed to be the summer's virtuoso meta-fiction, but its rewritten happy ending, musing on the impotence of writing, seems a lot less bleak than Scary Stories' acknowledgment that some scripts will take you far away where you'll never be seen again."

Tomris Laffly of RogerEbert.com gave the film three stars out of four, stating "Still, Scary Stories is a strangely uplifting throwback to old-fashioned clans of investigative teens. While it doesn't break any new ground, there is plenty of vintage fun to be had with kids who feel their way through life's impending fears and live to tell the tale." Writing for The Guardian, Simran Hans gave the film three stars out of five, noting "Producer and co-writer Guillermo del Toro brings Alvin Schwartz's much-loved children's book series to the big screen, but this uneven film can't decide who it's trying to scare." The New Yorker's Richard Brody mentioned "There's authentic charm to the fine-grained didacticism of the plot of Scary Stories, which embodies the very virtues that it promotes. In the process of displaying the redemptive power of factual knowledge, however, the movie flattens and tames the power of imagination." David Ehrlich of IndieWire added "André Øvredal's film adaptation, as clever and well-crafted as it is, can't help but invert the formula that the source material relied upon for its success. Here is an R-rated concept that's been watered down until it passed for a PG-13 movie; it's plenty harrowing and full of gruesome effects, but it never feels dangerous." The Atlantic's Julie Beck noted "The best scary stories do that—they get under your skin and emerge again and again. (The worms crawl in, the worms crawl out.) Scary Stories the movie just bounces right off."

David Fear of Rolling Stone gave the movie three stars out of five, commenting "It's all a lot of chain-rattling, black-cat-screeching fun, though not such a blast that you don't notice how generic and ramshackle the whole endeavor feels ... The pity is that Scary Stories to Tell in the Dark will mostly be seen by jaded genre completists and nostalgic fortysomethings. Wrong demographic. You owe it to your kids to take them to this. It's training-wheels horror done right." Aja Romano of Vox gave the film three and half points out of five and wrote "the film leans all the way into the chance to tell a story beset with cultural anxieties of the past that strongly mirror those of the present. It's far more like a classic piece of young adult fiction than the juvenile fiction it's adapting; its focus isn't on kids, but on teens who are coming of age in a turbulent, complicated, and often maliciously unjust world. Their supernatural monsters, in contrast, are culled from juvenile fears and fantasies. The resulting folkloric aesthetic makes Scary Stories' brand of fantasy all the more effective as fun visual horror. But on a thematic level, it creates a discordance with the film's more adult social horrors, and the two elements never quite unify." A.A. Dowd of The A.V. Club gave the film B grade and wrote "Like scouts huddled around a campfire, each trying to send a bigger chill down the others' spines, Scary Stories To Tell In The Dark keeps coming up with new gruesome attractions, piling one on top of the next. Yet as gross and spooky and, yes, occasionally frightening as these terror tactics get, they never quite cross over into the deep end of truly grown-up horror." The Times of India's Neil Soans gave the film three stars out of five, noting "The screenplay ends up as a jumble of unexplored ideas onscreen rather than a cohesive narrative. However, if you only enjoy horror films for creepy monsters, you'll manage to get a kick or two."

=== Accolades ===
Award	Year	Category	Recipient	Result	Ref.
Saturn Awards	2021	Best Horror Film	Scary Stories to Tell in the Dark	Nominated	
Saturn Awards	2021	Best Make-up	Norman Cabrera, Mike Elizalde, and Mike Hill	Nominated	

== Sequel ==
In April 2020, it was officially announced that a sequel to the film was in development, with Øvredal returning to direct and Paramount Pictures (which had absorbed CBS Films as part of the reintegration of CBS and Viacom) distributing. Colletti, Garza, Ganzhorn, and Norris were set to reprise their roles, with the Hagemans returning as writers, and del Toro returning as producer.

As of August 2023, according to Øvredal, work continued on the project; the story had been completed, and the script was being revised.
