= List of awards and nominations received by Kristen Wiig =

Kristen Wiig awards and nominations
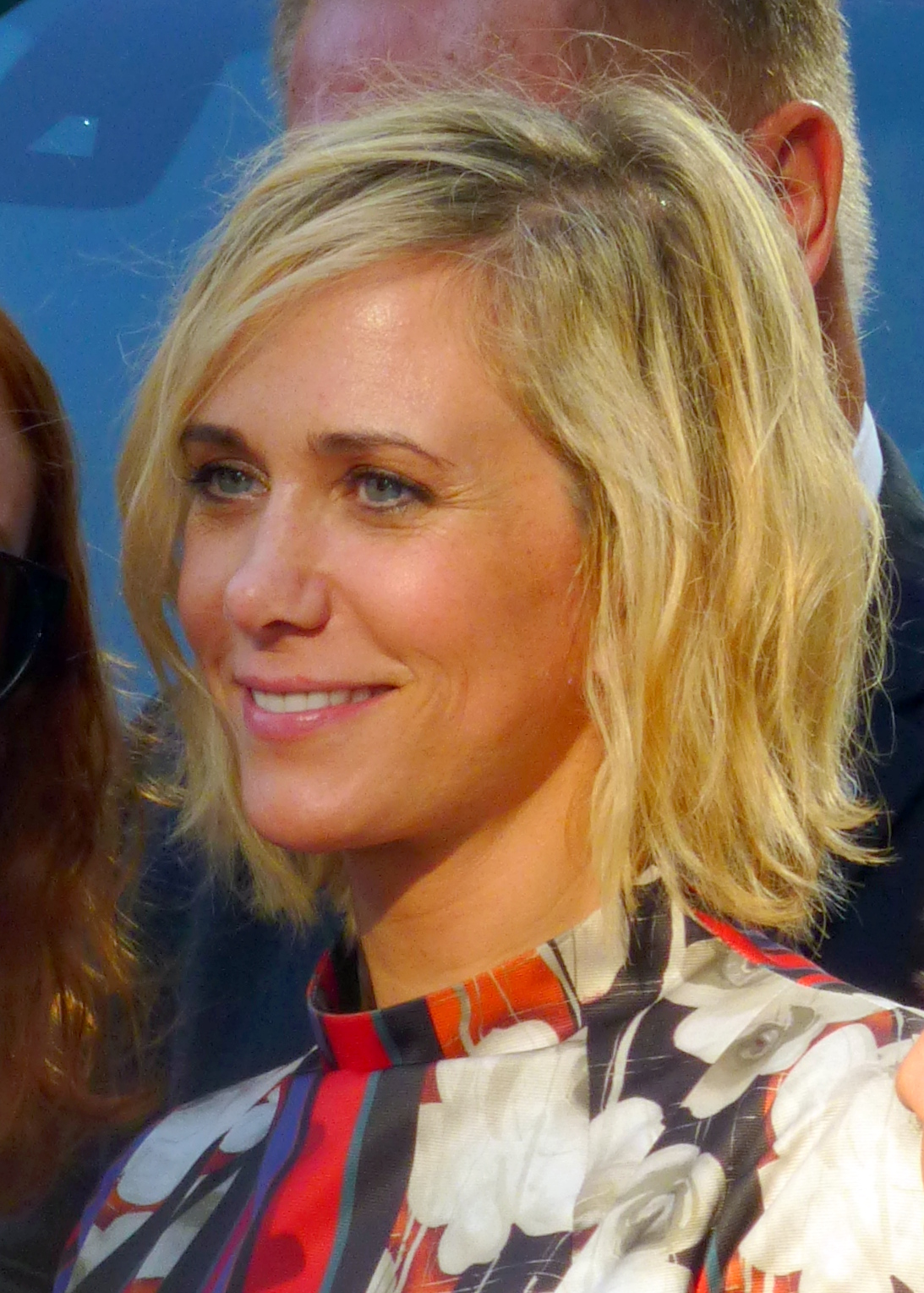
- Wiig at the TIFF 2014
Awards and nominations
| Award | Wins | Nominations |
| Academy Awards | 0 | 1 |
| BAFTA Awards | 0 | 1 |
| Emmy Awards | 0 | 13 |
| Golden Globe Awards | 0 | 1 |
| Screen Actors Guild Awards | 0 | 1 |

Totals (Note: Certain award groups do not simply award one winner. They acknowledge several different recipients, have runners-up, and have third place. Since this is a specific recognition and is different from losing an award, runner-up mentions are considered wins in this award tally. For simplification and to avoid errors, each award in this list has been presumed to have had a prior nomination.)
- Wins: 12
- Nominations: 58

Here is a List of awards and nominations received by Kristen Wiig throughout her career.

Kristen Wiig is an actress, comedian, and writer. She is known for her work as a cast member on Saturday Night Live and as an actor and co-writer for Bridesmaids (2011). She has been nominated for an Academy Award, a British Academy Film Award, four Critics' Choice Awards, a Golden Globe Award, twelve Primetime Emmy Awards, a Screen Actors Guild Award and a Writers Guild of America Award.

She starred in the Paul Feig directed comedy film Bridesmaids (2011) for which she was nominated for the Academy Award for Best Original Screenplay and BAFTA Award for Best Original Screenplay and as an actress for the Golden Globe Award for Best Actress in a Motion Picture – Comedy or Musical, and Screen Actors Guild Award for Outstanding Performance by a Cast in a Motion Picture. For her role in the dramedy The Skeleton Twins (2014) she was nominated for the Critics' Choice Movie Award for Best Actress in a Comedy.

She starred as a main cast member on the NBC sketch comedy series Saturday Night Live from 2005 to 2012 earning nominations for 12 Primetime Emmy Awards (four Outstanding Supporting Actress in a Comedy Series nominations and three Outstanding Guest Actress in a Comedy Series). She also received nominations for the Primetime Emmy Award for Outstanding Lead Actress in a Limited or Anthology Series or Movie playing Lauoreighiya Samcake in the comedic miniseries The Spoils of Babylon (2014) and the Primetime Emmy Award for Outstanding Lead Actress in a Comedy Series for her role as Maxine Dellacorte-Simmons in the Apple TV+ comedy series Palm Royale (2024).

== Major awards ==
=== Academy Awards ===
| Year | Category | Nominated work | Result | Ref. |
|---|---|---|---|---|
| 2011 | Best Original Screenplay | Bridesmaids | Nominated | |

=== BAFTA Awards ===
| Year | Category | Nominated work | Result | Ref. |
British Academy Film Awards
| 2011 | Best Original Screenplay | Bridesmaids | Nominated | |

=== Critics' Choice Awards ===
| Year | Category | Nominated work | Result | Ref. |
Critics' Choice Movie Awards
| 2011 | Best Acting Ensemble | Bridesmaids | Nominated | |
| 2014 | Best Actress in a Comedy | The Skeleton Twins | Nominated | |
| 2024 | Best Song | "Harper and Will Go West" | Nominated | |
Critics' Choice Television Awards
| 2024 | Best Actress in a Comedy Series | Palm Royale | Nominated | |

=== Emmy Awards ===
| Year | Category | Nominated work | Result | Ref. |
Primetime Emmy Awards
| 2009 | Outstanding Supporting Actress in a Comedy Series | Saturday Night Live (Episode: "Neil Patrick Harris / Taylor Swift") | Nominated | |
| 2010 | Outstanding Supporting Actress in a Comedy Series | Saturday Night Live (Episode: "James Franco / Muse") | Nominated | |
| 2011 | Outstanding Supporting Actress in a Comedy Series | Saturday Night Live (Episode: "Jane Lynch / Bruno Mars") | Nominated | |
| 2012 | Outstanding Supporting Actress in a Comedy Series | Saturday Night Live (Episode: "Mick Jagger / Mick Jagger") | Nominated | |
| 2012 | Outstanding Voice-Over Performance | The Looney Tunes Show (Episode: "Double Date") | Nominated | |
| 2013 | Outstanding Guest Actress in a Comedy Series | Saturday Night Live (Episode: "Kristen Wiig / Vampire Weekend") | Nominated | |
| 2014 | Outstanding Lead Actress in a Miniseries or a Movie | The Spoils of Babylon | Nominated | |
| 2017 | Outstanding Guest Actress in a Comedy Series | Saturday Night Live (Episode: "Kristen Wiig / The xx") | Nominated | |
| 2021 | Outstanding Guest Actress in a Comedy Series | Saturday Night Live (Episode: "Kristen Wiig / Dua Lipa") | Nominated | |
| 2024 | Outstanding Guest Actress in a Comedy Series | Saturday Night Live (Episode: "Kristen Wiig / Raye") | Nominated | |
| 2024 | Outstanding Comedy Series | Palm Royale | Nominated | |
| 2024 | Outstanding Lead Actress in a Comedy Series | Palm Royale (Episode: "Maxine Throws a Party") | Nominated | |
| 2025 | Outstanding Original Music and Lyrics | "Harper and Will Go West" (from Will & Harper) | Nominated | |

=== Golden Globe Awards ===
| Year | Category | Nominated work | Result | Ref. |
|---|---|---|---|---|
| 2011 | Best Actress in a Motion Picture – Comedy or Musical | Bridesmaids | Nominated | |

=== Screen Actors Guild Awards ===
| Year | Category | Nominated work | Result | Ref. |
|---|---|---|---|---|
| 2012 | Outstanding Cast in a Motion Picture | Bridesmaids | Nominated | |
| 2016 | Outstanding Actress in a Miniseries or Television Movie | The Spoils Before Dying | Nominated | |
| 2026 | Outstanding Female Actor in a Comedy Series | Palm Royale | Nominated | |

== Miscellaneous awards ==
| Organizations | Year | Category | Work | Result | Ref. |
|---|---|---|---|---|---|
| Alliance of Women Film Journalists | 2011 | Best Ensemble Cast | Bridesmaids | Won | |
| Alliance of Women Film Journalists | 2011 | Best Woman Screenwriter | Bridesmaids | Won | |
| Annie Awards | 2014 | Outstanding Voice Acting in a Feature Production | Despicable Me 2 | Nominated | |
| Behind The Voice Actors Awards | 2012 | Best Female Vocal Performance in a Television Series in a Supporting Role | The Looney Tunes Show | Won | |
| Behind The Voice Actors Awards | 2012 | Best Female Vocal Performance in a Television Series in a Supporting Role | The Looney Tunes Show | Nominated | |
| Behind The Voice Actors Awards | 2012 | Best Vocal Ensemble in a Television Series | The Looney Tunes Show | Nominated | |
| Behind The Voice Actors Awards | 2013 | Best Female Lead Vocal Performance in a Television Series - Comedy/Musical | The Looney Tunes Show | Nominated | |
| Behind The Voice Actors Awards | 2013 | Best Vocal Ensemble in a Television Series - Comedy/Musical | The Looney Tunes Show | Nominated | |
| Behind The Voice Actors Awards | 2014 | Best Vocal Ensemble in a Television Series - Comedy/Musical | The Looney Tunes Show | Nominated | |
| Behind The Voice Actors Awards | 2014 | Best Female Lead Vocal Performance in a Television Series - Comedy/Musical | The Looney Tunes Show | Nominated | |
| Behind The Voice Actors Awards | 2014 | Best Female Lead Vocal Performance in a Feature Film | Despicable Me 2 | Nominated | |
| Behind The Voice Actors Awards | 2014 | Best Vocal Ensemble in a Feature Film | Despicable Me 2 | Nominated | |
| Behind The Voice Actors Awards | 2015 | Best Female Vocal Performance in a Feature Film in a Supporting Role | How to Train Your Dragon 2 | Nominated | |
| Behind The Voice Actors Awards | 2015 | Best Vocal Ensemble in a Feature Film | How to Train Your Dragon 2 | Nominated | |
| Behind The Voice Actors Awards | 2018 | Best Vocal Ensemble in a Feature Film | Despicable Me 3 | Nominated | |
| Golden Raspberry Awards | 2017 | Worst Supporting Actress | Zoolander 2 | Won | |
| Golden Raspberry Awards | 2021 | Worst Supporting Actress | Wonder Woman 1984 | Nominated | |
| IGN Summer Movie Awards | 2011 | Best Movie Actress | Bridesmaids | Won | |
| Kids' Choice Awards | 2017 | Favorite Movie Actress | Ghostbusters | Nominated | |
| Kids' Choice Awards | 2017 | #Squad (shared with cast) | Ghostbusters | Nominated | |
| MTV Movie Awards | 2012 | Best Gut-Wrenching Performance | Bridesmaids | Won | |
| MTV Movie Awards | 2012 | Best Female Performance | Bridesmaids | Nominated | |
| MTV Movie Awards | 2012 | Best Comedic Performance | Bridesmaids | Nominated | |
| MTV Movie Awards | 2015 | Best Musical Moment | The Skeleton Twins | Nominated | |
| Online Film & Television Association | 2010 | Best Female Performance in a Fiction Program | Saturday Night Live | Nominated | |
| Online Film & Television Association | 2011 | Best Female Performance in a Fiction Program | Saturday Night Live | Won | |
| Online Film & Television Association | 2012 | Best Female Performance in a Fiction Program | Saturday Night Live | Won | |
| Online Film & Television Association | 2012 | Best First Screenplay | Bridesmaids | Won | |
| Online Film & Television Association | 2012 | Best Writing, Screenplay Written Directly for the Screen | Bridesmaids | Nominated | |
| Online Film & Television Association | 2012 | Best Voice-Over Performance | The Looney Tunes Show | Nominated | |
| Online Film & Television Association | 2013 | Best Female Performance in a Fiction Program | Saturday Night Live | Nominated | |
| Online Film & Television Association | 2014 | Best Actress in a Motion Picture or Miniseries | The Spoils of Babylon | Nominated | |
| Online Film & Television Association | 2017 | Best Guest Actress in a Comedy Series | The Last Man on Earth | Nominated | |
| People's Choice Awards | 2017 | Favorite Comedic Movie Actress | Ghostbusters | Nominated | |
| Women Film Critics Circle Awards | 2014 | Best Screen Couple | The Skeleton Twins | Won | |
| Women Film Critics Circle Awards | 2016 | Best Female Action Hero | Ghostbusters | Won | |
| Writers Guild of America Awards | 2012 | Best Original Screenplay | Bridesmaids | Nominated | |
