= Simon Cellan Jones =

British television and film director

Simon Cellan Jones (born January 1963) is a British television and film director.

== Career ==
Simon Cellan Jones began his career as a production assistant in the mid-1980s, working on series such as Edge of Darkness. By the late 1980s he had worked his way up to become a director, and he gained credits on some of the most acclaimed British television productions of the 1990s. These included episodes of Cracker (1993) and Our Friends in the North (1996).

He was nominated as the Best Newcomer at the British Academy Film Awards for his first feature film Some Voices (2000). Other television credits have included BBC One's Sherlock Holmes and the Case of the Silk Stocking (2004) and More4's The Trial of Tony Blair (2007).

== Personal life ==
Simon is the son of fellow director James Cellan Jones, and the half-brother of BBC News journalist Rory Cellan-Jones.

He married Sarah Jane O'Brien in 1986; they later divorced. He married Elizabeth Starling Gifford in 2003.

== Filmography ==
=== Feature films ===
- Some Voices (2000)
- The One and Only (2002)
- The Family Plan (2023)
- Arthur the King (2024)
- The Family Plan 2 (2025)

=== Television ===
Asst. floor manager on several editions of Howards' Way in 1985.

- The Bill (1989) (1 episode)
- Streetwise (1989)
- Medics (1992) (2 episodes)
- Cracker (1993) (1 episode)
- Rik Mayall Presents – episode, "The Big One" (1995)
- Our Friends in the North (1996) (episodes 3, 6–9)
- In Your Dreams (1997)
- Storm Damage (2000)
- Eroica (2003) — won Prix Italia for Performing Arts in 2004
- Sherlock Holmes and the Case of the Silk Stocking (2004)
- The Queen's Sister (2005)
- Coup! (2006)
- The Trial of Tony Blair (2007)
- Generation Kill (2008)
- Paradox (2009)
- On Expenses (2010)
- Treme (2010)
- Boardwalk Empire (2010) (episode 10)
- The Borgias (2011)
- Klondike (2014)
- Jessica Jones (2015)
- Shooter (2016)
- The Tap (2017)
- The Expanse – episode, "Abaddon's Gate" (2018)
- Ballers (2015-2018)
- Years and Years (2019)
- See – Season 2 Episode 01, "Brothers and Sisters" (2021)
- The Diplomat - (2023 -)
