= The Family Plan =

2023 film by Simon Cellan Jones

- Release poster
- Directed by: Simon Cellan Jones
- Written by: David Coggeshall
- Produced by: David Ellison; Dana Goldberg; Don Granger; Mark Wahlberg; Stephen Levinson
- Starring: Mark Wahlberg; Michelle Monaghan; Zoe Colletti; Van Crosby; Saïd Taghmaoui; Maggie Q; Ciarán Hinds
- Cinematography: Michael Burgess
- Edited by: Tim Porter
- Music by: Kevin Matley
- Production companies: Apple Studios; Skydance Media; Municipal Pictures
- Distributed by: Apple TV+
- Release date: December 15, 2023
- Running time: 119 minutes
- Country: United States
- Language: English

The Family Plan is a 2023 American action comedy film starring Mark Wahlberg as a suburban car salesman who goes on the run with his unsuspecting family when his secret past as a government assassin is exposed. The film also stars Michelle Monaghan, Zoe Colletti, Van Crosby, Saïd Taghmaoui, Maggie Q, and Ciarán Hinds. It is directed by Simon Cellan Jones and written by David Coggeshall.

Apple Studios began production in late 2022. The film was released by Apple TV+ on December 15, 2023. It received generally negative reviews, but became most-viewed on the platform for a brief time. A sequel, The Family Plan 2, was released on November 21, 2025.

== Plot ==
Dan Morgan, an ex-assassin who works as a car salesman, lives quietly in the Buffalo suburbs with his wife Jessica and their three kids; teens Nina and Kyle, and infant Max. Dan is content with his low-key life and dislikes violence, tech, and social media. Meanwhile, Jessica yearns for more spontaneity and excitement.

Dan and Jessica attend an amusement park for their anniversary. He has a confrontation when someone takes a selfie with them kissing in the background as a joke, then posts it on social media. Dan walks away, refusing to engage in a fight. Soon after, Dan is attacked in a supermarket while shopping with Max but easily defeats the highly trained attacker. Afterward, Dan contacts his former associate, Augie, to find out why it happened. He suggests it is Dan's former employer, McCaffrey, and advises Dan to disappear.

Realizing the carnival photo outed him, Dan orders new fake passports for him and his family from Augie. He retrieves Nina from school, Kyle from a secret game house where he is a popular gaming streamer, and Jessica from work, telling them they're taking a spontaneous road trip to Las Vegas, where he is meeting Augie to collect their new IDs.

As they're leaving town, Dan realizes they're being followed; therefore, their minivan must have a tracker on it. At work, he uses a service bay to find and remove it from the undercarriage. Meanwhile, McCaffrey and his team search the Morgans' home but can't find their destination, as Dan has covered their tracks. He drives through the night until reaching Iowa City. Excited, Nina begs them to visit Southern Iowa University as she hopes to follow her boyfriend Trevor there rather than pursue her original goal of attending Stanford. She catches Trevor cheating on her, so Dan teaches her martial arts moves to use on him. During a campus tour, Dan fights another of McCaffery's assassins and incapacitates him in a chemistry lab before rejoining his family.

As they travel, the family grows closer. Arriving in Vegas, Dan plans to tell Jessica the truth over a romantic dinner. The teens are to babysit Max in their penthouse suite, but instead they go down to the HyperX gaming arena in the hotel. When Dan and Jessica return to their suite to check on the kids, McCaffrey's team attacks them. He quickly kills them, shocking Jessica. Heading to HyperX to retrieve the kids, a shootout ensues, and the family witnesses Dan kill more assassins.

Admitting that his real name is Sean, Dan finally comes clean to his family, who are outraged by his deception. He nevertheless gives them their new IDs, telling them that their lives in Buffalo are over, but Jessica takes the kids and leaves the next morning, believing they aren't in danger if they leave Dan. She calls a recent new acquaintance, Gwen, a travel agent who offers to fly them home.

On the private jet, Gwen reveals she works for McCaffrey and is Dan's ex-girlfriend, whom she is angry at for leaving. Taking Dan's family hostage in an abandoned hotel, McCaffrey, who is revealed to be Dan's father, offers their freedom if Dan accepts his offer to rejoin his team and have no contact with his family; Dan relents.

Jessica and the kids escape after Jessica kills their escort, and they return for Dan. McCaffrey calls his army into the hotel to kill him. Dan engages the mercenaries, with Kyle helping with a drone. Jessica fights Gwen, culminating in Jessica fatally impaling Gwen with a piece of broken bamboo thrown as a javelin from her track and field experience. They head downstairs, where Nina distracts McCaffrey from killing Dan, giving Dan time to knock McCaffrey out, who is taken into custody, while Dan reconciles with his family.

The Morgans return to their lives in Buffalo; Dan now runs a security firm to train clients to better defend against attacks while Jessica coaches high school track and field. They load up a rented RV to embark on a cross-country road trip to take Nina to Stanford.

== Cast ==
- Mark Wahlberg as Dan Morgan / Sean McCaffrey, a car salesman and former covert assassin
- Michelle Monaghan as Jessica Morgan, Dan's wife who was a former decathlete
- Zoe Colletti as Nina Morgan, Dan and Jessica's daughter and eldest child
- Van Crosby as Kyle Morgan, Dan and Jessica’s middle child
- Saïd Taghmaoui as Augie, an associate of Dan who deals fake identities
- Maggie Q as Gwen, Jessica's friend
- Ciarán Hinds as Liam McCaffrey, a commander of covert assassins who are pursuing the Morgans, as well as Dan’s former employer
- Joyner Lucas as Coogan, McCaffrey's henchman
- Kellen Boyle as Cyrus, McCaffrey's henchman
- Felicia Pearson as Toothpick, McCaffrey's henchman
- Lateef Crowder dos Santos as Neck Tattoo, McCaffrey's henchman
- Miles Doleac as Gold Chain, a German tourist
- Jonny Coyne as Spiros, McCaffrey's henchman
- Rachell Marie Hofstetter as Valkyrae

== Production ==
In August 2022, Apple Studios announced an action comedy film from Skydance Media and Municipal Pictures to star Mark Wahlberg. In October 2022, Michelle Monaghan and Saïd Taghmaoui joined the cast. Other cast members added were Ciarán Hinds, Maggie Q, Zoe Colletti, Van Crosby and Miles Doleac.

Principal photography commenced in October 2022 in Atlanta, Georgia, under the working title Holiday Road. A car dealership in Canton, Georgia, was used as a location for the film. A helicopter was used to film aerial footage in downtown Buffalo, New York, in early November. An ice cream shop in Clermont, Georgia, was transformed into Lambert's Diner for the film. In February 2023, Wahlberg filmed scenes at The Strat casino resort in Las Vegas and also wrapped filming.

== Release ==
The film was released on Apple TV+ on December 15, 2023. Deadline Hollywood reported the film became Apple TV+'s most watched film. It was later surpassed by the 2024 film Wolfs.

== Reception ==
On the review aggregator website Rotten Tomatoes, 27% of 37 critics' reviews are positive, with an average rating of 4.6/10. The website's consensus reads: "Heavy on rote action and light on laughs, The Family Plan aimlessly imitates an array of films that tell similar stories -- and often in more compelling fashion." Metacritic, which uses a weighted average, assigned the film a score of 39 out of 100, based on 11 critics, indicating "generally unfavorable" reviews.

Guy Lodge of Variety gave a negative review, calling the film a "strangely sluggish shoot-'em-up". He criticized Coggeshall's script, writing that it "repeatedly underlines the mismatch between the wholesome white-bread family at its center and the hard-boiled genre proceedings in which it increasingly embroils them, but with no accompanying sense of giddy absurdism". Calum Marsh writing for The New York Times gave a positive review; he praised director Jones saying that he "maintains a good handle on the comic-thriller tone and shoots the action with wit and creativity" and wrote that, "Wahlberg is more charismatic than he's been onscreen in nearly a decade".

Frank Scheck of The Hollywood Reporter wrote, "Stretching its high concept but thin results to the breaking point, The Family Plan feels like a movie whose best moments were during the pitch meeting" and that "to say it's predictable is an insult to predictability". The Guardian's Peter Bradshaw said: "The script works efficiently and everyone involved sells it hard; there are continuous closeup cutaways to that cute and gurgling baby who never cries no matter what happens. But the sheer robotic sheen of the film in the end works against it; Dan's teen son happens to be a super-talented gamer and in fact the whole movie has a Grand Theft Auto aesthetic".

== Sequel ==
In March 2024, Jones teased that the sequel was being written. On October 30, 2024, Apple TV+ announced the sequel, with Jones, Coggeshall, and Wahlberg returning as the director, writer, and producer respectively. It was confirmed on December 11, that Kit Harington has joined the film, along with other cast members who are set to reprise their roles. The film was released on November 21, 2025.
