= A Boy Called Christmas =

2021 film directed by Gil Kenan

- Theatrical release poster
- Directed by: Gil Kenan
- Screenplay by: Ol Parker; Gil Kenan
- Based on: A Boy Called Christmas by Matt Haig
- Produced by: Graham Broadbent; Pete Czernin
- Starring: Henry Lawfull; Toby Jones; Sally Hawkins; Kristen Wiig; Michiel Huisman; Zoe Colletti; Stephen Merchant; Jim Broadbent; Maggie Smith
- Cinematography: Zac Nicholson
- Edited by: Peter Lambert; Richard Ketteridge
- Music by: Dario Marianelli
- Production companies: StudioCanal; Blueprint Pictures; Canal+; Ciné+
- Distributed by: Netflix (International); Sky Cinema; NOW (United Kingdom and Ireland); StudioCanal
- Release date: 24 November 2021
- Running time: 106 minutes
- Countries: United Kingdom; United States
- Language: English
- Box office: $3.7 million

A Boy Called Christmas is a 2021 British Christmas fantasy film directed by Gil Kenan from a screenplay by Ol Parker and Kenan, based on the 2015 book of the same name by Matt Haig, and starring Henry Lawfull, Toby Jones, Sally Hawkins, Kristen Wiig, Michiel Huisman, Zoe Colletti, Stephen Merchant, Jim Broadbent, and Maggie Smith. It tells the story of a boy who travels to a land of elves with the mouse that he trained to speak as he ends up coming to their aid when people sent by the king, which his father is part of, make off with one of the elves. The story is told by an old woman to her grand-niece and grand-nephews.

The film was released on 26 November 2021 by StudioCanal in the UK, France and Germany, in Australasia (Australia and New Zealand) and in China by StudioCanal; Netflix released the film internationally on 24 November 2021. The film received positive reviews from critics and has grossed $3.8 million at the box office.

In the UK, the film was classed as a Sky Original and became available to watch on Sky Cinema and streaming on Sky's streaming service NOW.

== Plot ==
On Christmas Eve, Andrea, Moppet, and Patrick, whose mother has died recently and whose father Matt is leaving for an urgent task for work, are put in the care of their mother's Aunt Ruth who tries to entertain the children by telling a Christmas tale.

13-year-old Nikolas and his father Joel, a woodcutter, live in the forest. Nikolas's mother had died two years before, eaten by a bear, and Nikolas tries to take comfort every night remembering the legend of a place called Elfhelm where a girl found a magical place inhabited by elves that helped her to survive the winter. One night a mouse tries to steal some food but his life is spared by Nikolas who calls the mouse Miika and tries to teach him to speak.

One day, the King calls his subjects and promises a big reward if someone is able to find an object that would bring hope to the kingdom. Joel joins a group of hunters to try to find Elfhelm. Joel leaves Nikolas under the care of Aunt Carlotta, a selfish woman who makes his life miserable.

Nikolas finds a map that confirms the existence of Elfhelm so he decides to go to the Extreme North to find his father and give him the map. During the journey, Nikolas discovers that Miika has learned to speak and this provides hope in continuing his quest. When they reach the Half Moon Forest, a reindeer who Nikolas names Blitzen allows Nikolas to mount him.

The trio reach Elfhelm but find nothing there except for Joel's knife. Nikolas loses hope and collapses. He is found by Little Noosh and Father Topo. Father Topo gives Nikolas a "hope spell" that allows him to recover. Father Topo informs him that he is in Elfhelm, but it is only visible to the people who believe in the place.

Nikolas is able to see Elfhelm after believing in the elves and tries to stay. He learns from Mother Vodel that a group of humans, including Joel, has kidnapped a small elf called Little Kip. Nikolas is sentenced to be eaten by a troll in the Dark Tower, However, Nikolas manages to escape with the help of the young fairy Truth Pixie. He then decides to try to find Joel's party and clarify the misunderstanding.

In the forest, Nikolas finds a group of hunters and Little Kip, but he is trapped by them and discovers his father is with them. Joel has a change of heart and comes up with a plan. He frees Nikolas, Little Kip, and Blitzen and they run away from the hunters. Blitzen is unable to lift the sled with Joel sitting in it, so Joel decides to sacrifice himself to allow the others to fly away.

Nikolas comes back to Elfhelm with Little Kip and he is able to bring the little elf on time to prevent Father Topo from being punished. Little Kip's parents reward Nikolas with the elves' traditional making of toys. Nikolas then has an idea and has all the elves create bountiful gifts of toys and candies.

Nikolas is about to ride Blitzen with the gifts when he is confronted by Mother Vodol. She sees the locket he carries with him showing the portrait of her mother, revealing that the girl who reached Elfhelm in the legend is none other than Nikolas's mother. Mother Vodol then tells him about how she lost faith in the humans when news spread in the place that the men (including Joel) took Little Kip. Nikolas tells her that his mother always remembered how joyful it was in Elfhelm.

Nikolas goes back to the kingdom on Christmas Eve and shows himself to the King, offering one of the toys. Confused, the King asks him about the meaning of the gift, leading Nikolas to take him to all the houses in the kingdom to leave toys for the children while trying to not disturb them. After Nikolas helps Carlotta to believe, the King decides to help.

Finishing the story, Aunt Ruth explains to the children the meaning of Nikolas's actions and she felt that one of them has already accepted the fate of their mother and is learning to live with that. The children already realised the boy is Father Christmas (Santa Claus).

Matt comes back to find to their surprise that the living room is filled with Christmas ornaments and presents. As Aunt Ruth puts on her hat, her pointy ears are briefly visible. Then when she leaves their place, she throws a firecracker into the sky, revealing herself to be the Truth Pixie.

== Cast ==
- Henry Lawfull as Nikolas a.k.a. "Christmas", a young boy who would go on the path to becoming Father Christmas (Santa Claus).
- Toby Jones as Father Topo, an Elfheim elf who finds Nikolas.
- Sally Hawkins as Mother Vodol, the ruler of Elfheim who has enforced its rules in light of an encounter with bad humans.
- Kristen Wiig as Aunt Carlotta, the unpleasant aunt of Nikolas.
- Michiel Huisman as Joel, a woodcutter who is Nikolas' father and Carlotta's brother
- Zoe Colletti as the Truth Pixie, a pixie who can only speak the truth.
- Maggie Smith as Aunt Ruth, the mortal form of the Truth Pixie who narrates the story despite having to stop to answer her great-niece and great-nephews' questions.
- Stephen Merchant as the voice of Miika, a mouse who Nikolas raised after convincing his father to spare it.
- Jim Broadbent as the King, the unnamed ruler of the unnamed kingdom that Nikolas lives in.
- Indica Watson as Little Noosh, a young elf girl who is often in the company of Father Topo.
- Joel Fry as Matt, the widowed father of Andrea, Patrick and Moppet and the nephew of Ruth.
- Isabella O'Sullivan as Andrea, the daughter of Matt and great-niece of Ruth.
- Eden Lawrence as Patrick, the son of Matt and the great-nephew of Ruth.
- Ayomide Garrick as Moppet, the son of Matt and the great-nephew of Ruth.
- Rishi Kuppa as Little Kip, an elf who is captured.
- Rune Temte as Anders, a hunter
- Trish Osmond as an unnamed elderly goose lady whom Nikolas briefly encounters in his journey who claims that he won't find what he is looking for. During the climax, it is revealed that she has a granddaughter.
- Peter Hosking as an Additional Elf

== Production ==
A deal was completed in May 2016 for the book to be adapted into film by Blueprint Pictures and StudioCanal. Ol Parker was set to write the screenplay.

In April 2019, Gil Kenan was revealed to be directing the film, with Jim Broadbent, Sally Hawkins, Maggie Smith and Kristen Wiig amongst the cast. Filming began that same month, with production occurring in Lapland, Finland, Czech Republic, Slovakia and London.

== Stage adaptation ==
A stage adaptation of A Boy Called Christmas was performed by Chichester Festival Youth Theatre at Chichester Festival Theatre between from 15th-31st December 2025.

== Release ==
The film was released on 26 November 2021 in the UK, Australia, New Zealand, France, Germany and China, by StudioCanal. Netflix released the film internationally on 24 November 2021.

== Reception ==
On Rotten Tomatoes, the film has an approval rating of 83% based on 30 reviews, with an average rating of 6.70/10. The site's critical consensus reads, "A Boy Called Christmas offers few surprises, but makes up for its lack of originality with a heaping helping of winsome holiday spirit." On Metacritic, the film has a weighted average score of 66 out of 100 based on 5 critics, indicating "generally favorable reviews".

== See also ==
- List of Christmas films
