= Michael Garza =

American actor

- Born: February 1, 2000 (age 26); Texas, U.S.
- Occupation: Actor
- Years active: 2014–present

Michael Garza (born February 1, 2000) is an American actor, writer, and filmmaker.

== Biography ==
Garza was born in Texas and is of Mexican ancestry.

Garza made his onscreen debut in the 2014 film The Hunger Games: Mockingjay – Part 1 as the role of Eddy. In 2016, he started a series regular role as Frank Armstrong in the second season of the FOX series Wayward Pines (2016). In 2018, he went on to appear in the NBC series Timeless and TBS' Angie Tribeca. In 2019, he led the 2019 film Scary Stories to Tell in the Dark as Ramón Morales, which is the work he is most known for. In 2020, he guest starred as Milo Garner in the FOX series 9-1-1. In 2023, he appeared in the film DogMan. From 2023 onward, he has continued to appear in numerous series from Hacks, to NCIS, Pulse and more.

== Filmography ==
=== Film ===
Year	Title	Role	Notes
2014	The Hunger Games: Mockingjay – Part 1	Eddy	
2019	Scary Stories to Tell in the Dark	Ramon Morales	
2023	DogMan	Juan	

=== Television ===
Year	Title	Role	Notes
2016	Wayward Pines	Frank Armstrong	7 episodes
2018	Timeless	Mark	Episode: "The Day Reagan Was Shot"
2018	Angie Tribeca	Teen	Episode: "Glitch Perfect"
2020	9-1-1	Milo Garner	Episode: "What's Next?"
2023	Quantum Leap	Camilo Diaz	Episode: "Ben Song for the Defense"
2023 - 2024	NCIS	Reymundo De Leon	2 episodes
2025	Chicago P.D. (TV series)	Art Cervantes	1 episode
2025	Pulse	Julio Carlos	1 episode
2022 - 2026	Hacks	Silas	4 episodes
