= Zoe Colletti =

American actress (born 2001)

- Born: Zoe Margaret Colletti; November 27, 2001 (age 24); Burlington, New Jersey, U.S.
- Occupations: Actress, YouTuber
- Years active: 2006–present

Zoe Margaret Colletti (born November 27, 2001) is an American actress and YouTuber. She made her acting debut in the television pilot of American Men (2006) and played her first major-film role in Annie (2014). Colletti appeared in 2018 films Wildlife and Skin before garnering critical praise in the lead role of Stella Nicholls in horror film Scary Stories to Tell in the Dark (2019). She achieved further recognition and plaudits as Dakota in the sixth season of horror drama series Fear the Walking Dead (2020–2021) and the Truth Pixie in fantasy film A Boy Called Christmas (2021). In 2022 she portrayed Lucy in the second season of Only Murders in the Building. She also starred in the Netflix series Boo, Bitch, and she featured in The Family Plan as well as its sequel.

== Life and career ==
Zoe Margaret Colletti was born on November 27, 2001, in the United States. Her first credited role was in 2006's television pilot of American Men. In 2014, Colletti portrayed Tessie in Annie, her first major-film role. The film received negative reviews from critics, though the cast was praised. In 2018, Colletti starred in Wildlife and Skin, both of which garnered positive reviews. She played the lead role of Stella Nicholls in horror film Scary Stories to Tell in the Dark (2019), based on the children's books of the same name. According to TV Guide, Colletti sent an audition tape and was contacted within an hour. The film was praised, as was Coletti's performance. Variety called her "avidly captivating", and Empire said she "thankfully lends some emotive weight" to her character's issues and suffering. Colletti is set to reprise her role in the film's sequel.

In December 2019, Colletti joined the cast of the sixth season of AMC's Fear the Walking Dead as a series regular (later revealed to be Dakota). Colletti explained the role was "pretty crazy", having been a fan of The Walking Dead since age 12. She offered to be an extra in the original series; she unsuccessfully auditioned for The Walking Dead: World Beyond, though she was one of the final actresses running for the role. Despite a lack of success in World Beyond, the audition gave her connections with other shows in the franchise, and casting directors offered her the role in Fear the Walking Dead. Den of Geek commended her performance in "USS Pennsylvania", which aired on June 6, 2021, saying "Colletti is great[.] ... [She] brings a lot to the table this week ... [and has the] ability to bring real depth to Dakota". Dakota was killed off in the sixth-season finale, which aired a week later. In August of that year, she was cast as Gia, the best friend of Erika (Lana Condor), in Netflix comedy series Boo, Bitch. In November, she starred as the Truth Pixie in A Boy Called Christmas. The character was entirely—with the exception of its face, which was Colletti's—created using computer-generated imagery. The film was a critical success, and Colletti's performance received admiration. RogerEbert.com lauded her chemistry with co-star Henry Lawfull and "appealing sparkle".

== Filmography ==
=== Film ===
Year	Title	Role	Notes
2014	Annie	Tessie Marcus	Credited as Zoe Margaret Colletti
2018	Wildlife	Ruth-Ann	Credited as Zoe Margaret Colletti
2018	Skin	Desiree	
2019	Scary Stories to Tell in the Dark	Stella Nicholls	
2021	A Boy Called Christmas	Truth Pixie	Streaming film
2022	Gigi & Nate	Lori	
2023	The Family Plan	Nina Morgan	
2024	Please Don't Feed the Children	Mary	
2025	The Family Plan 2	Nina Morgan	
2026	BRB	Dylan	
2026	Love on Tap	Courtney	

=== Television ===
Year	Title	Role	Notes
2006	American Men	Emma Wilson	Television pilot; credited as Zoe Margaret Colletti
2010	Past Life	Elana Moody	Episode: "Running on Empty"
2010	Rubicon	Sophie Young	Recurring; 4 episodes; credited as Zoe Margaret Colletti (Note: Colletti was credited as Zoe Margaret Colletti except in "Gone in the Teeth", where she was credited as Zoe Colletti.)
2019	Law & Order: Special Victims Unit	Britney Moore	Episode: "A Story of More Woe"
2019	City on a Hill	Benedetta "Benny" Rohr	Recurring (season 1 (Note: Lucia Ryan replaced Colletti in the show's second season.)); 7 episodes
2020–2021	Fear the Walking Dead	Dakota	Main role (season 6); 11 episodes
2022	Boo, Bitch	Gia	Main role
2022	Only Murders in the Building	Lucy	Recurring (season 2)
