= Last Day on Earth (The Walking Dead) =

- The Walking Dead episode
- Rick and his group kneel before Negan.
- Episode no.: Season 6 Episode 16
- Directed by: Greg Nicotero
- Written by: Scott Gimple; Matthew Negrete
- Cinematography by: Michael E. Satrazemis
- Editing by: Dan Liu
- Original air date: April 3, 2016
- Running time: 65 minutes

Guest appearances
- Austin Amelio as Dwight; Steven Ogg as Simon; Katelyn Nacon as Enid; Stuart Greer as Roman; Kenric Green as Scott; Jeffrey Dean Morgan as Negan; Dahlia Legault as Francine; Kevin Patrick Murphy as Library Survivor; Daniel Newman as Daniel

Episode chronology
← Previous "East"	Next → "The Day Will Come When You Won't Be"
- The Walking Dead season 6

"Last Day on Earth" is the sixteenth and final episode of the sixth season of the post-apocalyptic horror television series The Walking Dead, which aired on AMC on April 3, 2016. The episode was written by Scott Gimple and Matthew Negrete, and directed by Greg Nicotero.

This episode marks the first appearance of Jeffrey Dean Morgan as Negan, the intimidating leader of the Saviors who rules in tyranny and in turn also marks the debut of Steven Ogg as Simon, a top Savior who is Negan's right-hand man. The episode received mixed reviews from critics, with criticism directed towards the pacing and cliffhanger ending, but acclaim directed at Morgan's performance.

== Plot ==
After Maggie suffers pain from pregnancy, Rick and the group urgently try to get her to the Hilltop Colony in their RV for medical attention; however, every one of the routes they take is blocked by a progressively larger number of Saviors, led by Simon (Steven Ogg), with increasingly frightening capabilities.

Concurrently, Morgan finds Carol injured from a cut on her stomach and patches her up. While Morgan goes outside to kill a walker that is making noise, Carol flees and Morgan again pursues on horseback. Roman, the Savior who survived her attack, finds Carol first, shooting her in the right arm and leg, stating that she will suffer like his friends did. Morgan shows up just in time to save her, breaking his vow by killing Roman, and encounters two men wearing armor who approach on horseback: one of them is the mysterious survivor from the barn that Morgan saved from Rick. After the strangers offer them help, Morgan agrees to get Carol medical assistance.

After nightfall, with time running out, Eugene volunteers to be bait to distract the Saviors by driving the empty RV by himself to lure them while the rest of the group carry Maggie to the Hilltop through the woods on foot. However, as the group carries a very weak Maggie on a stretcher, they end up running into the midst of a large group of Saviors, led by Simon from earlier, who were expecting and waiting for them all to arrive. The Saviors have already beaten up Eugene and captured him, along with Glenn, Michonne, Rosita, and a gravely wounded but alive, Daryl as well as the RV. The entire group is disarmed and are forced on their knees.

As the group kneels helplessly on the ground, a man with a baseball bat wrapped in barbed wire steps out of the group's RV. In an intimidating manner, he approaches and greets a nervous Rick, revealing himself to be Negan (Jeffrey Dean Morgan), the totalitarian leader of the Saviors. Unhappy, Negan berates Rick for killing many of his men and then goes on to explain the new world order: the group now works for him and half of their supplies now belong to him. He introduces Rick to his bat, which he calls "Lucille", and reveals that the entire set up, including the roadblocks, was simply to decide "who gets the honor" of dying as punishment for their actions. When Negan threatens to put Maggie out of her misery, Glenn lunges at him in order to defend her, but is pulled back in line by Dwight. Unable to choose a victim, Negan claims to have an idea; he starts a game of "eeny, meeny, miny, moe", pointing Lucille down the line of survivors as he recites the rhyme. He eventually lands on "it", making his choice. From the victim's point-of-view, Negan prepares to beat them, telling his men to cut out Carl's other eye and feed it to Rick should anyone move or say anything. Negan then slams Lucille down onto his victim's head. To the horror of the other survivors, Negan continues to beat the victim over and over again.

== Production ==
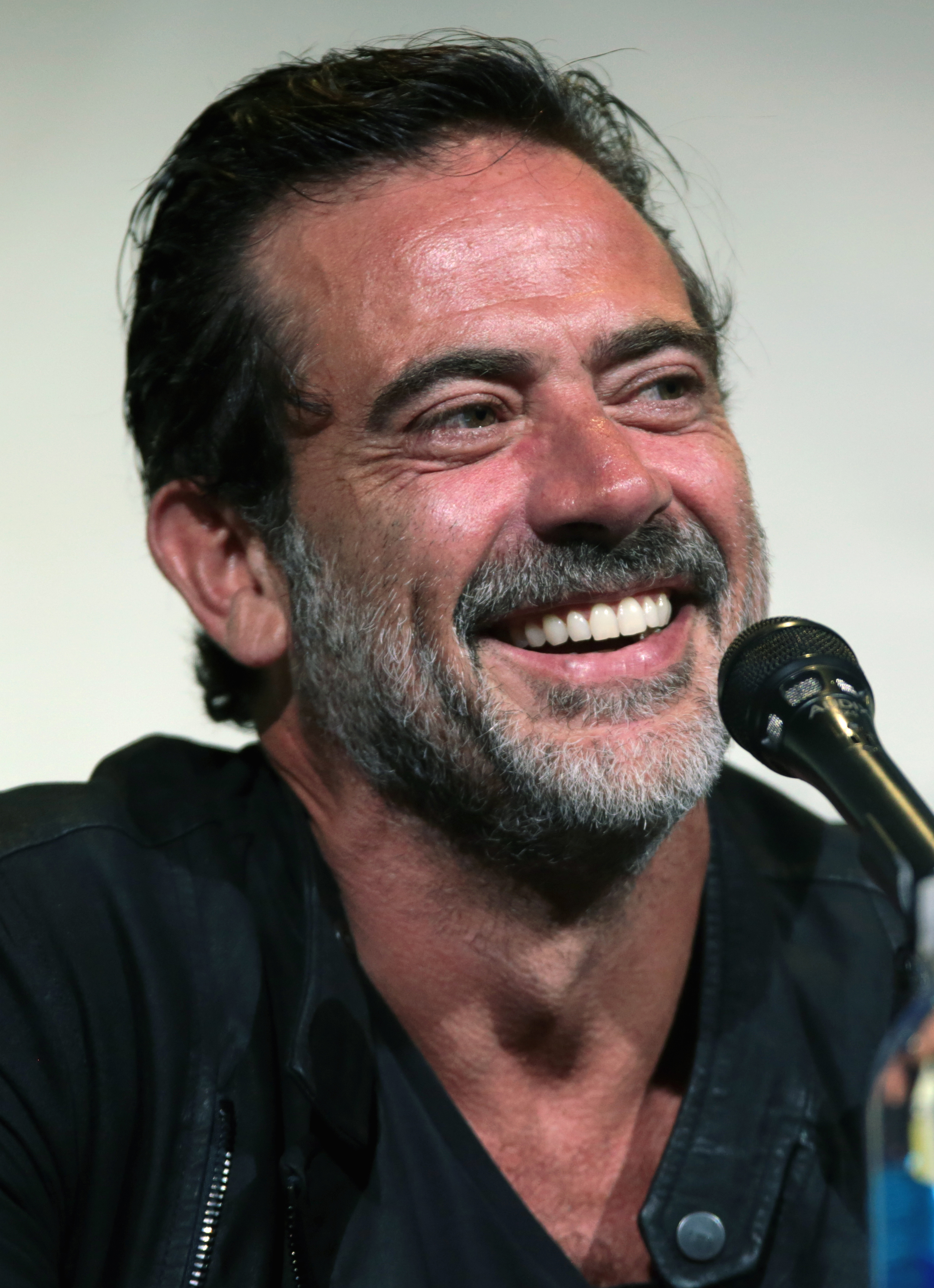
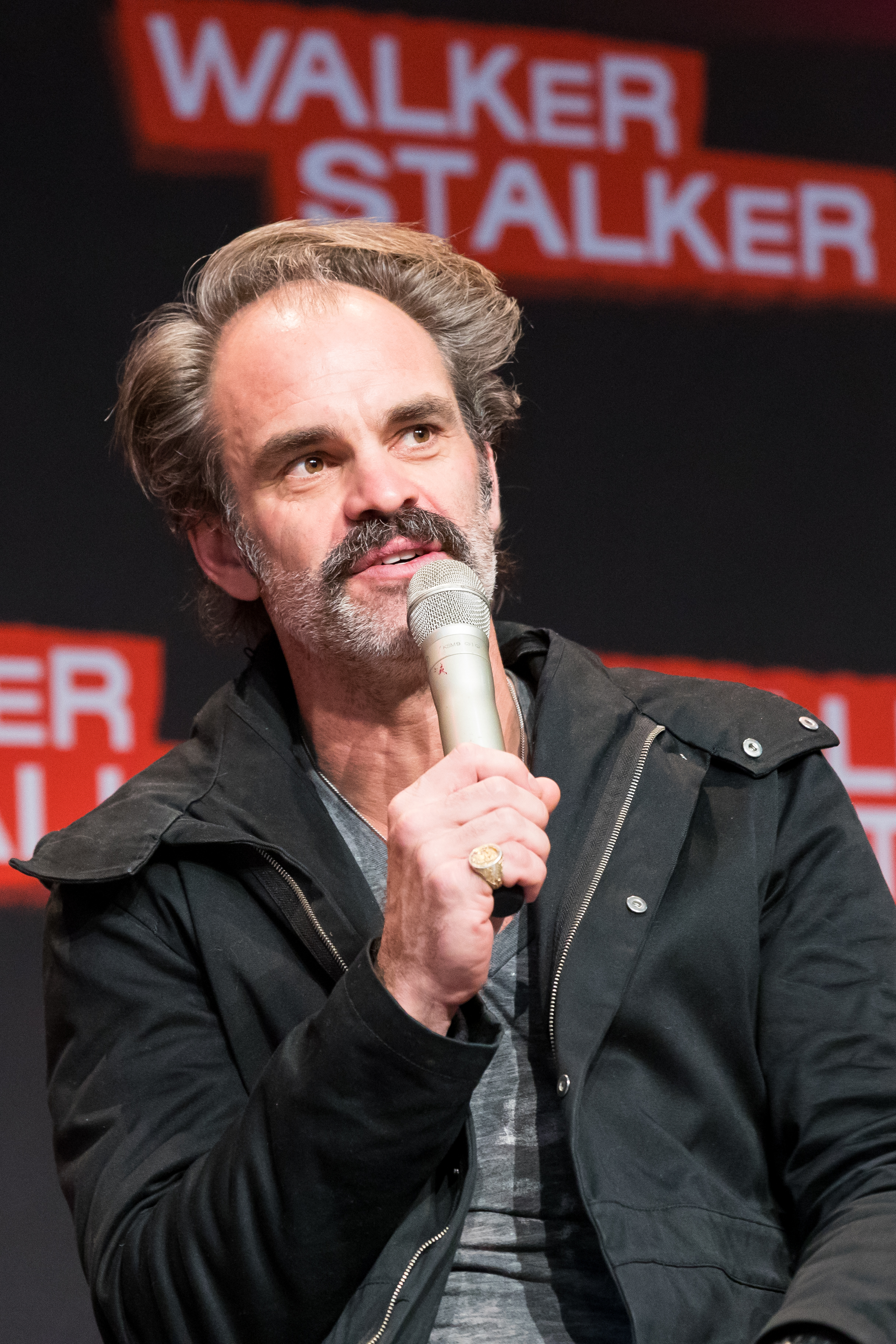
"Last Day on Earth" marks the debut of Negan portrayed by Jeffrey Dean Morgan (left) despite mixed reviews for the episode itself, Morgan received acclaim for his performance, also marks the debut of Simon, portrayed by Steven Ogg (right), a Savior and Negan's right-hand.

On November 10, 2015, it was announced that Jeffrey Dean Morgan had been cast as Negan and would make his debut in the season finale. This episode is the third in the sixth season to air in an expanded 90-minute time slot. Director Greg Nicotero confirmed that they filmed two versions of Negan's introduction – one for broadcast with toned down language and the other for the Blu-ray release, which has swearing to match his speech from the comics.

== Reception ==
=== Critical reception ===
"Last Day on Earth" received mixed reviews from critics. While Jeffrey Dean Morgan's performance as Negan was praised, the episode was mostly criticized for its pacing and cliffhanger ending. On Rotten Tomatoes, it holds a 44% with an average rating of 6.55 out of 10, based on 32 reviews. The critics' consensus reads: Despite Jeffrey Dean Morgan's deliciously evil turn as Negan, the meandering "Last Day on Earth"—and its manipulative cliffhanger ending—make for a disappointing season finale.

Matt Fowler of IGN gave it a 7.3 out of 10 in his review and commented, "For all that "Last Day on Earth" was really about, and what was important about it, it went on too long. And then failed to deliver a satisfying exclamation point. Instead, we got another fake out/cliffhanger. A technique this show is absolutely over indulging in. Jeffrey Dean Morgan was terrific as Negan though." Zack Handlen of The A.V. Club gave the episode a C, the lowest grade given by the website for the show to date, faulting the episode for awkward, drawn-out writing and forced story arcs which couldn't maintain an atmosphere of suspense as they moved inevitably toward a fixed ending everyone knew was coming. Emily VanDerWerff of Vox gave the episode a negative review, calling it the worst episode of the show so far, and commenting, "The extra-long episode spent its first hour dramatizing all the excitement of your GPS insisting that you take a road you already know is closed, and the last half-hour sank some nicely spooky moments with a too-long monologue and a completely botched cliffhanger." However, she gave a positive review on Negan's introduction.

In response to the backlash the cliffhanger received, showrunner Scott M. Gimple said:

If you approach it from a place of skepticism or with the idea that there's some kind of negative or cynical motivation behind it... it's difficult to convince you otherwise. I do think we've done enough on the show and we've delivered a story that people have enjoyed [to warrant fans giving] us the benefit of the doubt. I truly hope that people will see [the Season 7 premiere] and feel it justifies the way we've decided to tell the story.

=== Ratings ===
The episode received a 6.9 rating in the key 18-49 demographic with 14.19 million total viewers. This was a significant increase from the previous episode, "East", which received a 5.9 rating and 12.38 million total, but also significantly lower than the ratings for the season five finale, "Conquer", which was watched by 15.8 million American viewers with an 18-49 rating of 8.2. Including live +3 ratings, this episode was watched by 18.42 million Americans.
