= The Day Will Come When You Won't Be =

- The Walking Dead episode
- Near the end of the episode, a dream sequence is envisioned by Rick—Glenn is now a father and Abraham sits happily with Sasha; she is pregnant with their child.
- Episode no.: Season 7 Episode 1
- Directed by: Greg Nicotero
- Written by: Scott M. Gimple
- Cinematography by: Michael E. Satrazemis
- Editing by: Dan Liu
- Original air date: October 23, 2016
- Running time: 47 minutes

Guest appearances
- Katelyn Nacon as Enid; Steven Ogg as Simon; Kevin Patrick Murphy as Male Survivor

Episode chronology
← Previous "Last Day on Earth"	Next → "The Well"
- The Walking Dead season 7

"The Day Will Come When You Won't Be" is the seventh season premiere of the post-apocalyptic horror television series The Walking Dead, and its 84th overall. Written by Scott M. Gimple and directed by Greg Nicotero, it originally aired on AMC in the United States on October 23, 2016.

This episode features the final regular appearances of characters Abraham Ford (Michael Cudlitz) and Glenn Rhee (Steven Yeun), who are both brutally killed by Negan (Jeffrey Dean Morgan). Glenn's death is reminiscent of his death in the comic book series, where he is killed in virtually the same manner. However, Abraham's death in the comic books differs from his death in the TV series; he is killed by Dwight (Austin Amelio) in the comics, whereas Dwight kills Denise in the TV series.

The episode's title is a callback to Dr. Edwin Jenner's warning to Rick (Andrew Lincoln) from the first season finale ("TS-19"): Rick says that he's grateful for getting a shot at surviving the apocalypse, to which Edwin replies that "the day will come when you won't be."

== Plot ==
Cornered by Negan and his men, Rick and his group continue to be forced on their knees in front of Negan to pledge servitude to him. To further coerce them, Negan selects one of them to bash in their head with "Lucille", a baseball bat wrapped in barbed wire. His selected victim is Abraham, who remains defiant after the first strike. Negan proceeds to pulverize Abraham's head to a pulp, as the others recoil in horror. When Negan presents the blood-soaked bat to a horrified Rosita, Daryl leaps up and punches Negan, but is quickly subdued by Dwight and two other Saviors. Negan states he will not tolerate such behavior and punishes the group again, this time by bashing Glenn's head, much to Maggie's anguish. As the group watches in terror, Negan continues to smash Glenn's head in the same manner as Abraham's.

After witnessing Negan kill two members of his own party, Rick quietly vows to the Saviors' leader that he will kill him someday. Unfazed, Negan drags Rick to the group's RV, announcing that he will be back and if Rick isn't with him, his men have permission to kill the rest of Rick's gang. After taunting Rick, Negan drives off and brings the RV to a stop near one of the Saviors' roadblocks by an overpass, amid a horde of walkers in thick morning fog. Negan then tosses Rick's hatchet onto the RV's roof and orders Rick to retrieve it before pushing him out of the RV. Amidst the heavy fog and smoke, Rick scrambles for safety on the RV's roof and sees a walker body dangling from the overpass. He begins to have flashbacks to the deaths of Abraham and Glenn, but Negan becomes impatient for Rick to return and starts firing up through the roof. Immediately, Rick jumps to the hanging corpse, but slips and falls, dropping the hatchet. As the walkers swarm around his rival, Negan fires onto them, giving Rick the chance to collect the hatchet and return to the RV; Negan drives off.

As Rick sits in silence, Negan drives back to the clearing and hauls Rick from the RV. Reunited with both groups, Negan explains to Rick that he hoped that the trip changed Rick's mind about him. Since Rick still refuses to submit to him, Negan forces Rick to his knees and has his son, Carl, lie prone next to him. Negan then warns Rick that he will order his men to kill every member of Rick's group and those back at "home"—Alexandria—if he chooses not to cut off his son's arm. However, Rick begs Negan to let him take Carl's place instead, but Negan refuses. Hyperventilating and sobbing, an anguished Rick picks up the hatchet and braces himself to cut Carl when Negan stops him at the very last second, satisfied that Rick has finally submitted. Negan then goes on to announce that he and his men will show up at Alexandria in one week to take one half of Rick and company's supplies. After seizing Daryl as a hostage, Negan and the Saviors leave the group in despair.

After the group reels in shock and grief, Rick tells a heartbroken Maggie, still suffering from pregnancy complications, that they need to get her to the Hilltop Colony's doctor. However, Maggie urges that they all head back to Alexandria and prepare to fight. Rick counters, saying that they will all die if they go after Negan and his army. The group insists on continuing to the Hilltop, but Maggie demands that they do not follow her. Sasha volunteers to escort Maggie to the Hilltop to recover, along with the bodies of Glenn and Abraham. As a walker slowly approaches, Rick picks up his hatchet and joins the others in the RV. Saddened, Rick has a vision of his entire group, including Abraham and Glenn as well as Maggie's yet-born child, enjoying a peaceful outdoor meal together in Alexandria, before coming back to reality. Through the right hand side view-mirror, Rick sees the lone walker eating the leftover blood remains of Abraham as he drives away.

== Development ==
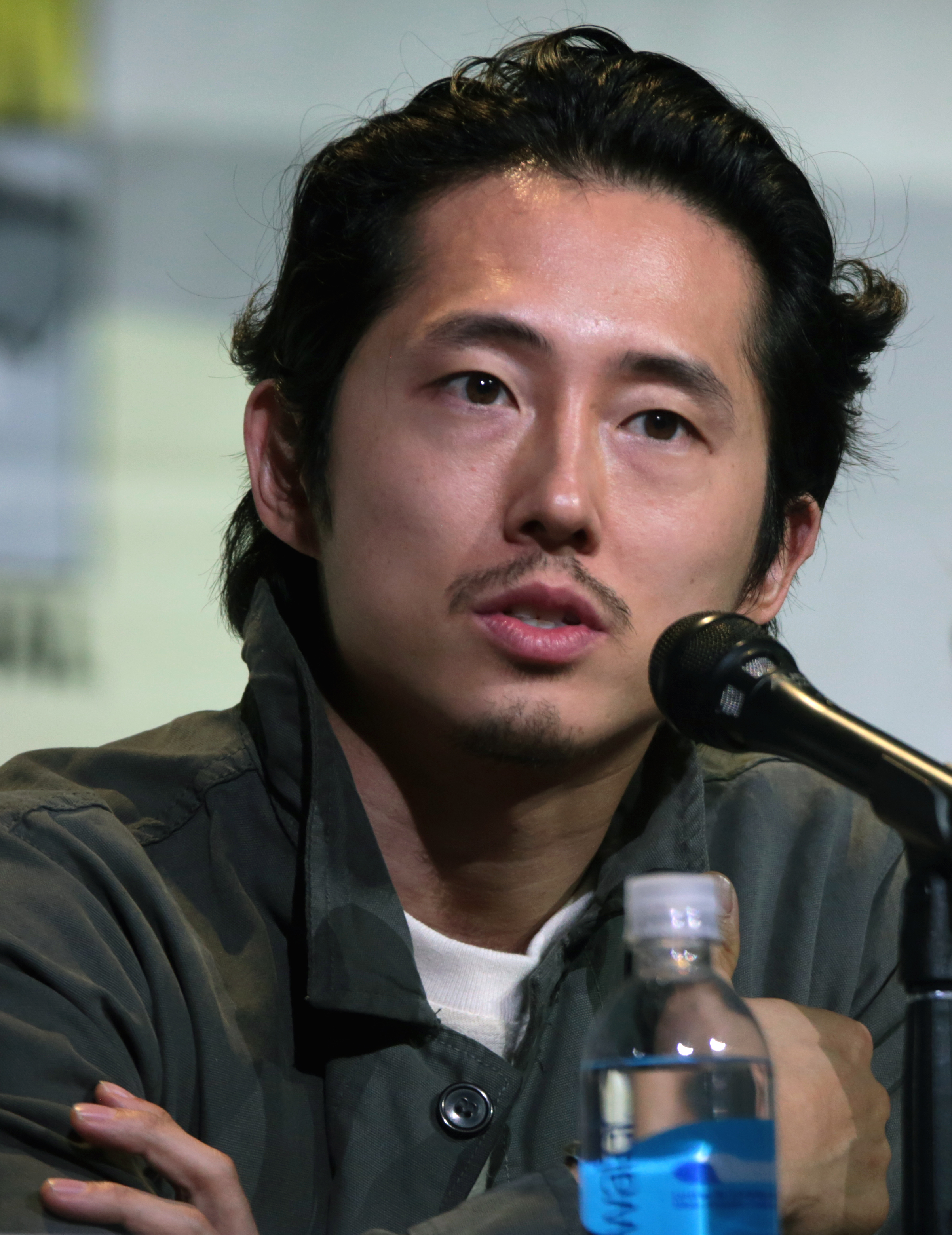
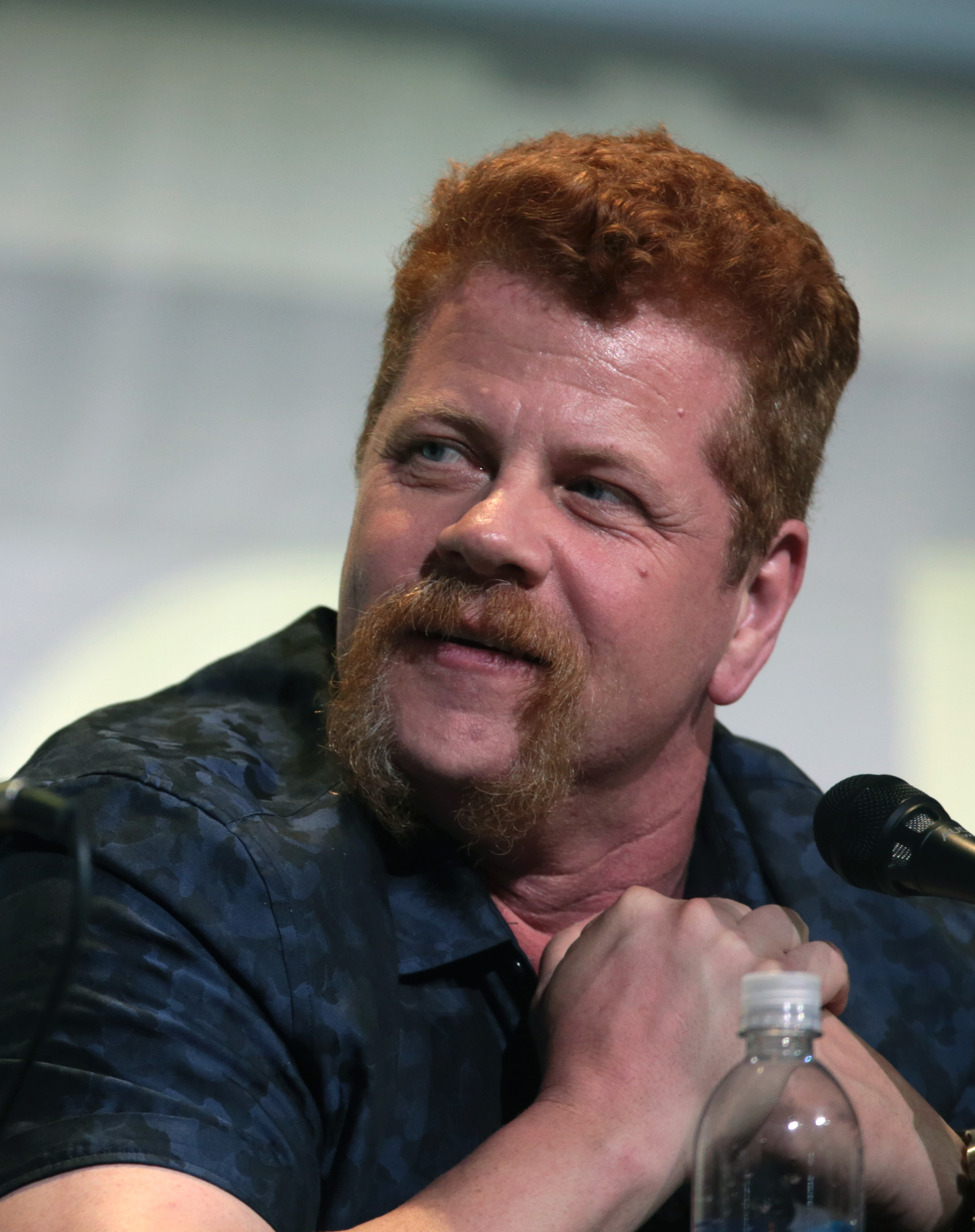
Steven Yeun (left) and Michael Cudlitz (right) made their final regular appearances in "The Day Will Come When You Won't Be".

"The Day Will Come When You Won't Be" covers events of "Volume 17", "Issue #100" of Robert Kirkman's original comic book series: Negan's introduction and his killing of Glenn. Kirkman worked with the show's producers to "transfer" comic-character deaths to other characters in the TV series; Dwight and other Saviors kill Abraham in the comics, but Dwight kills Denise in the episode "Twice as Far".

Kirkman and the showrunners wondered if Glenn's death was necessary, since Abraham had already been chosen for Negan's fatal beating. Glenn was the first character cast for the series whose fate was uncertain in the comics; Kirkman wrote "Issue #100" knowing that Steven Yeun was playing Glenn in the series, which made writing that issue difficult. Kirkman and the showrunners discussed options which would have spared Glenn's life, but "pulling the thread on this sweater just pulls too many things apart"; Glenn's death in the comics drives several characters' plotlines (Maggie in particular) and they considered it "essential" to the episode.

== Reception ==
=== Critical reception ===
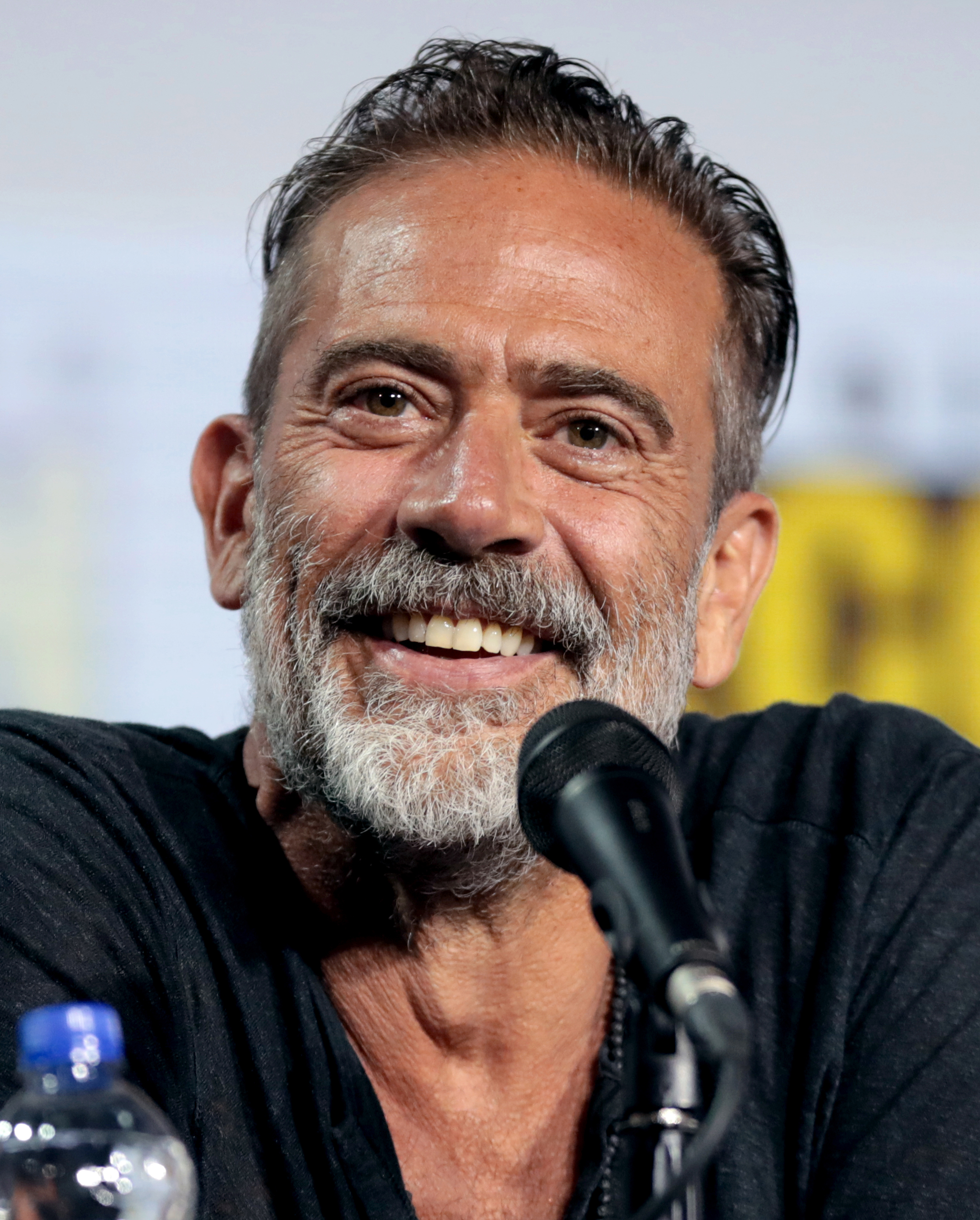
Jeffrey Dean Morgan was critically acclaimed for his performance while the development of Negan was also praised

"The Day Will Come When You Won't Be" received polarized reviews from critics. On the review aggregator website Rotten Tomatoes, 67% of 54 critics' reviews are positive, with an average rating of 7.0/10. The website's consensus reads: "The flashback-laden 'The Day Will Come When You Won't Be' is slow to deliver the payoff from last season's finale -- but ultimately delivers with sadistic acts of gut-wrenching violence that will push Walking Dead fans to their limit."

Matt Fowler of IGN rated it 6 out of 10 in his review: "It crossed a line, but not one of gore. Or death, even. Not necessarily. It basically broke the final shred of trust in the show to service characters over gimmickry." Zack Handlen of The A.V. Club gave the episode a C−, the lowest grade given by the website to the show thus far: "The show is so stupid that it thinks we're stupid, prays we're stupid; cross its fingers and hopes like hell that its legion of loyal, obsessive followers will rend their garments at the horrible death of a fan favorite, but still be back next week." According to Stuart Jeffries of The Guardian, "This was, to put it mildly, uncomfortable viewing: 45-plus minutes of torture porn mingled with something even more unpalatable ... this wasn't so much entertainment as psychic evisceration for us." Emily VanDerWerff of Vox wrote, "I've had a lot of issues with The Walking Dead of late — especially with that genuinely terrible season six finale — but I probably still would have called myself, in general, a “fan” of the show until tonight". Brian Lowry from CNN also criticized the episode: "Nevertheless, its most admirable qualities have increasingly been overshadowed by its more distasteful ones – not merely in demonstrating just how brutal humanity can be, but by toying with its audience." Jeff Stone of IndieWire wrote in his review, "It was miserable, and tedious, and made me feel bad. Not in an emotionally compelling way, just in a 'I could be watching something of value' way", and he graded the episode D−. Kristi Turnquist of The Oregonian was also critical: "The most shocking reveal was just how low executive producer and showrunner Scott M. Gimple and "Walking Dead" comics creator Robert Kirkman are willing to go for the sake of sensationalism and torture porn."

Other critics reviewed the episode positively. John Saavedra of Den of Geek! gave it four out of five stars: "Anyone hoping for an incredibly bloody hour of murder and mutilation the likes of which we'd never seen before on The Walking Dead should be pretty pleased with the season 7 premiere". Steve Wright of SciFiNow gave the episode a five-out-of-five rating in his review: "Sometimes, shows need a game-changing moment to jolt the formula and stop things from getting samey. If any show was in such dire need of one, it was The Walking Dead, and it has definitely got that. Welcome back." Mick van Hesteren of IGN Benelux rated it 10 out of 10 and called it a "masterpiece".

In reaction to the criticism about the amount of violence in the episode, executive producer Gale Anne Hurd said that in light of the negative feedback, they tamed some of the more gruesome scenes that were in episodes being filmed for the second half of the season. Hurd said that "this is not a show that's torture porn…. Let's make sure we don't cross that line". Executive producers Scott M. Gimple and Greg Nicotero countered this, stating that the violence in this episode was purposely over-the-top for the narrative, as that the "awfulness of what happened to the characters was very specific to that episode and the beginning of this whole new story", but that it did not reflect a baseline of violence they wanted for the series.

=== Ratings ===
The episode received an 8.4 rating in the 18–49 demographic range, with 17.03 million total viewers. It was the most-watched series of the night, with its second-best ratings.
