= Hostiles and Calamities =

- The Walking Dead episode
- Confronted by Negan, Eugene swears his loyalty and declares he is "Negan."
- Episode no.: Season 7 Episode 11
- Directed by: Kari Skogland
- Written by: David Leslie Johnson
- Cinematography by: Michael E. Satrazemis
- Editing by: Avi Youabian; Enrique Sanchez
- Original air date: February 26, 2017
- Running time: 48 minutes

Guest appearances
- Lindsley Register as Laura; Mike Seal as Gary; Martinez as David; Tim Parati as Dr. Emmett Carson; Autumn Dial as Amber; Chloe Aktas as Tanya; Elyse Nicole DuFour as Frankie; Gina Stewart as Vendor; Tyshon Freeman as Worker

Episode chronology
| ← Previous "New Best Friends" | Next → "Say Yes" |
- The Walking Dead season 7

"Hostiles and Calamities" is the eleventh episode of the seventh season of the post-apocalyptic horror television series The Walking Dead, which aired on AMC on February 26, 2017. The episode was written by David Leslie Johnson and directed by Kari Skogland.

The episode focuses on Eugene's (Josh McDermitt) experience and discovery that he must navigate the mysterious, confusing, and terrifying world within the Sanctuary where he unwillingly begins to work for Negan (Jeffrey Dean Morgan). Concurrently, Dwight (Austin Amelio) pays a visit to a place from his past.

== Plot ==
As Negan and his Saviors are returning from Alexandria with Eugene as their hostage, Dwight discovers that Daryl has escaped, and finds the anonymous note Daryl was passed in his cell along with Joey's beaten corpse. When Negan arrives back at the Sanctuary and upon learning of Daryl's escape, he orders Gary, David, and an unnamed Savior to have Dwight beaten up and put in the former's cell in order to punish him for letting their prisoner flee. Negan informs Dwight that Sherry has run away and wonders if she was responsible for Daryl's escape, but he defends her, leading Negan to question Dwight's own loyalty. He orders Dwight to find and bring back Sherry. After being mended by Dr. Emmett Carson, Dwight leaves for his and Sherry's home before the apocalypse, having planned long ago to use it as a rendezvous should they get separated. There, he finds a farewell note from Sherry, admitting to helping Daryl to escape, and telling Dwight he's become a different person. Dwight returns to Sanctuary, bitter. He lies to Dr. Carson that he killed Sherry when she was attacked by walkers.

Meanwhile, Laura shows a terrified Eugene to his new room where she offers to go and get him food. He really wants lobster or pickles, but she brings him some tinned orange spaghetti. After locking the door and calming down, he discovers a fridge stocked with beer, fruit, fresh vegetables and eggs. He turns on the hifi system which plays "Easy Street". Later she takes him to the factory floor and explains the point system and that he'll "eat good" because he's not "one of them" (a worker). Negan, still very angry about the damage to Lucille, questions Eugene about why he should just not beat him to death. In retort, Eugene falls back on his old lies that he has multiple PhDs in biochemistry as well as immunology and microbiology. He also lies about being a member of a ten-person team at the Human Genome Project to fight weaponized diseases. Put on the spot Eugene comes up with a plan to stop the captured perimeter walkers from rotting. Negan is impressed and takes a liking to him, whilst also using the opportunity to mock Rick as a leader and subsequently allows him to spend time with a few of his "wives": Tanya, Frankie, and Amber. The women bond with "Doctor" Eugene over video games and a few basic science experiments which greatly impress the drunken ladies. Later, Tanya and Frankie approach Eugene about making two poison capsules, explaining that Amber wants to commit suicide; Eugene reluctantly agrees. He finds that he has a position of power as he is able to cut in line and readily request the needed cold capsules to make the pills from the Savior marketplace, and finishes making the pills.

Negan publicly accuses Dr. Carson of allowing Daryl to go free. Dr. Carson refutes this, but Negan shows him a note they found in his office admitting to this, which Dwight had secretly cut from Sherry's letter and planted there. Dr. Carson attempts to blame Dwight, but Dwight remains steadfast. Negan goes onto explain that he knows Dwight is not lying, because if he ever found Sherry alive then he would lose the rest of his face. Negan prepares to brand Dr. Carson with a hot iron, but Dr. Carson relents and admits to letting Daryl go. As punishment, Negan throws Dr. Carson into the furnace, burning him to death, horrifying several members of the community.

Back in his room, Eugene tells Tanya and Frankie that he knows the pills are for Negan, not Amber, and refuses to turn them over. He accepts their berating that he is a coward but he reminds them that it would be pointless for them to rat him out to Negan, as they are replaceable and he is not; they angrily leave. Later, as Eugene is eating from his newly acquired jar of pickles, Negan arrives in what initially appears in a hostile mood and Eugene is visibly shaken. Negan says that Eugene no longer needs to be scared and prepares to ask him a question, but Eugene quickly responds "I'm Negan", pledging his allegiance to the Saviors. The next day, Eugene is overseeing defense preparations outside Sanctuary and as he eats another pickle he is joined by Dwight and they both declare that they "are Negan".

== Reception ==
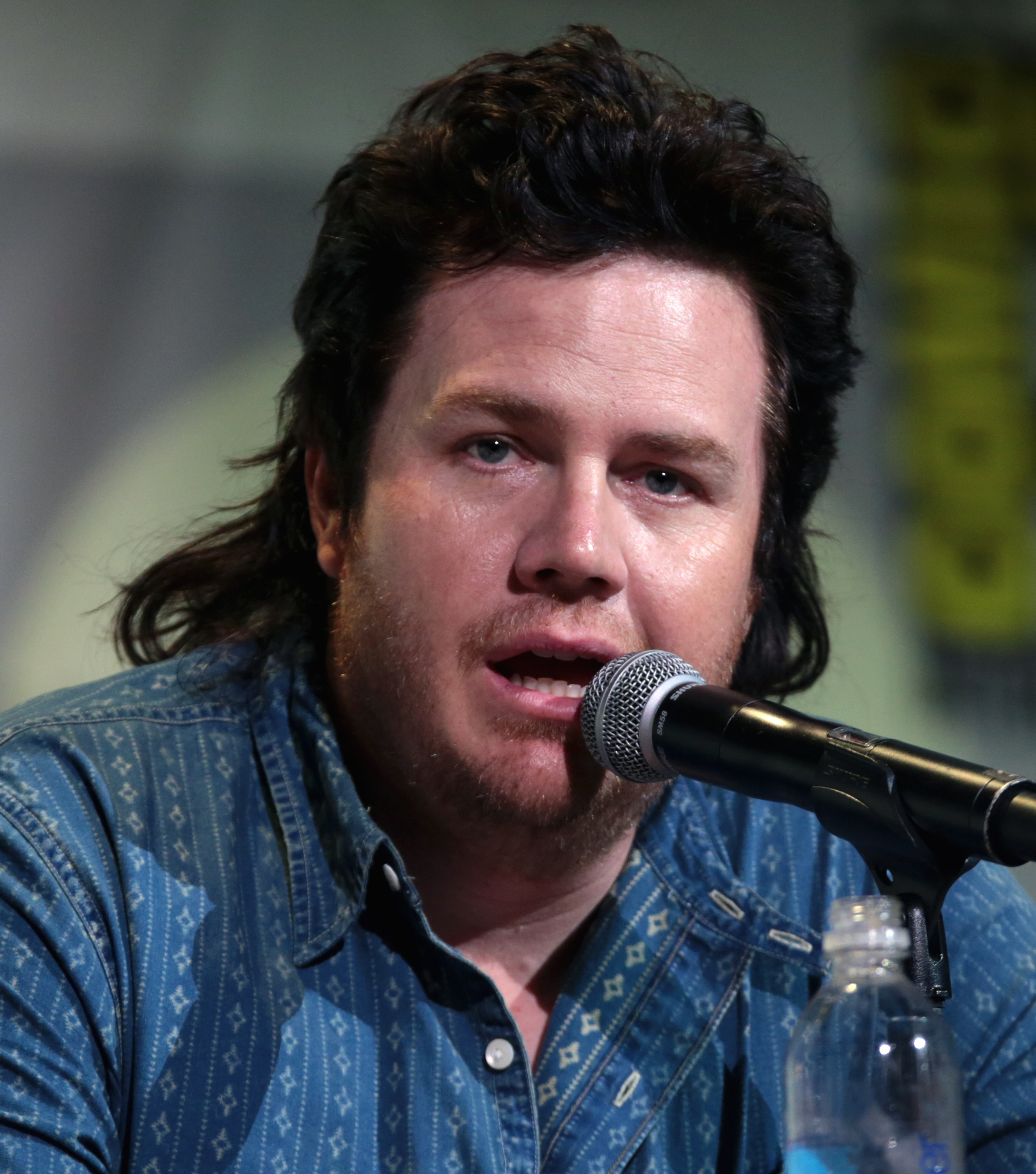
Josh McDermitt's character Eugene Porter is the central focus of this episode.

=== Critical reception ===
"Hostiles and Calamities" received positive reviews from critics, with several critics praising Austin Amelio's performance as Dwight. On Rotten Tomatoes, it holds an 84% with an average rating of 6.96 out of 10, based on 31 reviews. The site's consensus reads: "While it may slow the season's pace, "Hostiles and Calamities" takes a tense look inside previously unexplored Savior lives, advancing one character's logical and much-needed moral transformation."

Zack Handlen of The A.V. Club gave the episode a B. He called it a solid episode devoted to Eugene and his journey toward the "dark side," writing, "Whether or not that journey was entirely necessary is a question we can save for some other time; for now, it’s nice to have a story with a clear beginning, middle, and end, one that finds a character making an unexpected (and yet entirely plausible) choice."

=== Ratings ===
The episode received a 4.9 rating in the key 18-49 demographic with 10.42 million total viewers.
