= Twice as Far =

- The Walking Dead episode
- Denise talks to Rosita and Daryl, just moments before she is shot and killed by Dwight.
- Episode no.: Season 6 Episode 14
- Directed by: Alrick Riley
- Written by: Matthew Negrete
- Cinematography by: Stephen Campbell
- Editing by: Rachel Goodlett Katz
- Original air date: March 20, 2016
- Running time: 43 minutes

Guest appearances
- Merritt Wever as Dr. Denise Cloyd; Jason Douglas as Tobin; Ann Mahoney as Olivia; Austin Amelio as Dwight; Robert Walker-Branchaud as Neil

Episode chronology
← Previous "The Same Boat"	Next → "East"
- The Walking Dead season 6

"Twice as Far" is the fourteenth episode of the sixth season of the post-apocalyptic horror television series The Walking Dead, which aired on AMC on March 20, 2016. The episode was written by Matthew Negrete and directed by Alrick Riley.

This episode primarily focuses on two separate groups of characters going on supply runs; Daryl, Rosita, and Denise; and Abraham and Eugene. The episode marks Merritt Wever's final appearance of supporting character, Dr. Denise Cloyd, as she is killed off in this episode. It also marks the return of Austin Amelio as Dwight, who has been absent since the sixth episode of the season.

The episode received generally mixed reviews, with most criticism going towards Carol's decision to leave not making complete sense. However, high praise went towards the character development, the death of Denise, and the return of Dwight.

== Plot ==
Following their assault on the Saviors, everyone resumes their normal activities in Alexandria. Morgan finishes reinforcing his jail cell, telling Rick it will give them options in the future. Rosita wakes up in bed with Spencer, a relationship which seems to mean more to him than it does to her. Carol, still troubled by her experiences with the Saviors, confides in Daryl, who tells her he wishes he had killed the people he was with previously in the burnt-out forest.

Denise asks Daryl and Rosita to accompany her to a nearby pharmacy that might be stocked with medicines. Daryl and Rosita ask Denise to stay behind, but she insists that she's ready to go outside the walls. The three are forced to travel on foot after encountering a tree blocking the road. They arrive at the pharmacy, where Daryl and Rosita raid the shelves. Meanwhile, Denise enters a back room where she finds a trapped walker and a sink filled with blood and possibly a drowned child. Horrified, she runs out of the pharmacy, where she is soon re-joined by Daryl and Rosita, who praise her for leading them to the medicine.

Meanwhile, a more confident Eugene takes Abraham to an industrial machine shop, where Eugene announces he is going to use the shop to manufacture ammunition. A walker approaches, but Eugene is unable to kill it since the walker's head was drenched in liquid metal. Abraham steps in and kills it, which upsets Eugene, who insists he could have killed the walker himself. Eugene tells Abraham he doesn't need his help anymore, and Abraham leaves, telling Eugene to find his own way home.

On their way back to Alexandria, Denise spots a cooler inside a car inhabited by a walker. Ignoring Daryl and Rosita's warnings, she goes after the cooler. After an intense struggle, she kills the walker by herself and finds a can of orange soda that was in the cooler. Daryl scolds Denise for almost getting herself killed, but Denise says she needed the experience and specifically asked Daryl and Rosita to accompany her so she could learn from their strengths. Suddenly, a crossbow bolt strikes Denise through the eye from behind, killing her. Dwight, who stole Daryl's motorcycle, emerges from the woods with Daryl's crossbow and a group of armed Saviors, as well as a captured Eugene. Dwight, whose face has severe burn scars on one side, orders Daryl to lead his group to Alexandria. Spotting Abraham, Eugene claims they have a friend hiding behind some nearby oil barrels, urging Dwight to kill him first. As Dwight sends a Savior to investigate, Eugene bites Dwight in the crotch and Abraham opens fire. A shootout ensues and Eugene is hit in the crossfire. After several Saviors are killed, Dwight retreats with his remaining men.

After returning to Alexandria, Abraham and Eugene apologize to each other for their issues on the road. Abraham then goes to Sasha's house, where he convinces her to begin a relationship with him. She tells him to come inside her house. Daryl and Carol bury Denise in Alexandria, with Daryl feeling guilt over Denise's death.

In their house, Tobin reads a note from Carol in which she writes that she's leaving Alexandria and asks him (and everyone else) not to follow her.

== Production ==
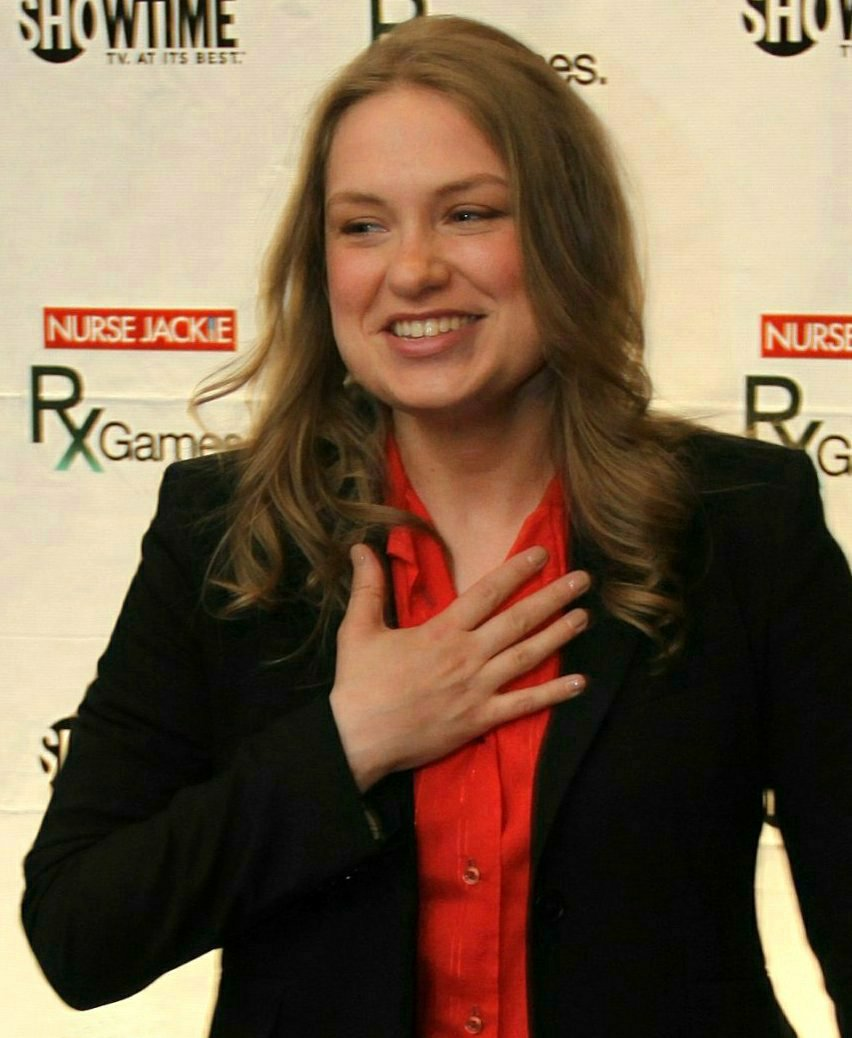
"Twice as Far" marked the last appearance of Dr. Denise Cloyd (Merritt Wever), as part of the recurring cast, since the beginning of the sixth season.

This episode marks the final appearance of guest actress Merritt Wever as Denise Cloyd, who was introduced in the beginning of the season. The character's death is different from in the comic book series. The episode also confirms that Austin Amelio's role is Dwight from the comics. He first appears in "Always Accountable" when he was only known as "D".

== Reception ==
=== Critical reception ===
The episode received mixed reviews from critics. It holds a 59% positive rating with an average score of 6.97 out of 10 on the review aggregator Rotten Tomatoes. The critics' consensus reads: "'Twice as Far' has a few powerful moments, but overall lacks enough focus or depth to make up for jumbled storylines, a pointless death, and a frustrating finish." Matt Fowler from IGN gave it an 8 out of 10 and positively commented on the two supply run missions and Denise's storyline, but felt Carol's decision to exile herself did not work. Zack Handlen of The A.V. Club gave the episode a "B+" grade.

=== Ratings ===
The episode averaged a 6.0 rating in adults 18-49, with 12.686 million viewers overall, a slight rise from the previous episode.
