= East (The Walking Dead) =

- The Walking Dead episode
- As Daryl and Rosita try to rescue Glenn and Michonne, Dwight sneaks up behind Daryl.
- Episode no.: Season 6 Episode 15
- Directed by: Michael E. Satrazemis
- Story by: Scott M. Gimple; Channing Powell
- Teleplay by: Channing Powell
- Cinematography by: Stephen Campbell
- Editing by: Avi Youabian; Evan Schrodek
- Original air date: March 27, 2016
- Running time: 43 minutes

Guest appearances
- Jason Douglas as Tobin; Austin Amelio as Dwight; Katelyn Nacon as Enid; Ann Mahoney as Olivia; Rich Ceraulo as Jiro; Stuart Greer as Roman; Daniel Newman as Daniel

Episode chronology
← Previous "Twice as Far"	Next → "Last Day on Earth"
- The Walking Dead season 6

"East" is the fifteenth and penultimate episode of the sixth season of the post-apocalyptic horror television series The Walking Dead, which aired on AMC on March 27, 2016. The episode's teleplay was written by Channing Powell, from a story by Scott M. Gimple and Powell, and directed by Michael E. Satrazemis.

== Plot ==
While Alexandria is locked-down against the Savior threat, Carol flees and is caught by a Savior patrol who want to use her to get into the community. She appears to beg them not to kill her, while playing the role of a terrified and weak woman, but is in reality begging them not to make her kill them. She then shoots them with a machine pistol from inside her coat sleeve, then dispatches two survivors in the aftermath, but one Savior named Roman survives and pursues her on foot after she leaves. Rick and Morgan find the site of the incident, and follow a blood trail they believe is Carol's, until Morgan sends Rick back due to his murderous reaction toward a non-hostile survivor.

Meanwhile, Daryl hunts Dwight to avenge Denise and is followed by Glenn, Michonne, and Rosita. When they catch up with him and attempt to talk him out of his mission he reacts with hostility, based on the guilt he feels for allowing Denise's death to occur. Rosita ends up joining Daryl, while Michonne and Glenn then start to make their way back to Alexandria. While they are stopped and talking, Dwight and a group of Saviors surrounds and captures them.

Back in Alexandria, Maggie asks Enid for help with something, which turns out to be cutting her hair. When Enid asks if Maggie likes it, she starts screaming out in pain and drops to the floor in agony.

Rosita and Daryl find out that Michonne and Glenn have been captured, and while they try to rescue them, Dwight and one of his Savior members sneak up behind them. Dwight says "Hi Daryl", then shoots him and afterwards, he tells him that he will be alright.

== Reception ==
=== Critical reception ===
The episode received generally positive reviews from critics. It holds a 68% positive rating with an average score of 7.1 out of 10 on the review aggregator Rotten Tomatoes. The critics' consensus reads: "'East' meanders quite a bit, but it also makes room for some thrills and leaves viewers with a huge cliffhanger leading into the season finale." Matt Fowler from IGN gave it a 7 out of 10 and positively commented on Rick, Morgan, and Carol's storyline, but questioned that several characters left Alexandria to go after the Saviors. Zack Handlen of The A.V. Club gave the episode a "B" grade. Bryan Bishop and Nick Statt of The Verge gave it a more negative review, criticizing what they saw as "lazy" writing. Bishop wrote that the bloody cliffhanger ending in which Daryl appeared to be shot was "a cheap, transparent gimmick intend to shock the show’s loyal audience, and nothing more."

=== Ratings ===
The episode averaged a 5.8 rating in adults 18-49, with 12.384 million viewers overall.
