= The Same Boat =

- The Walking Dead episode
- Maggie and Carol listen to the death throes of five men they trapped in a room with burning gasoline.
- Episode no.: Season 6 Episode 13
- Directed by: Billy Gierhart
- Written by: Angela Kang
- Cinematography by: Michael E. Satrazemis
- Editing by: Dan Liu
- Original air date: March 13, 2016
- Running time: 43 minutes

Guest appearances
- Alicia Witt as Paula; Jeananne Goossen as Michelle; Jill Jane Clements as Molly; Rus Blackwell as Donnie; Jimmy Gonzales as Primo

Episode chronology
← Previous "Not Tomorrow Yet"	Next → "Twice as Far"
- The Walking Dead season 6

"The Same Boat" is the thirteenth episode of the sixth season of the post-apocalyptic horror television series The Walking Dead, which aired on AMC on March 13, 2016. The episode was written by Angela Kang and directed by Billy Gierhart.

This episode focuses on the characters of Carol (Melissa McBride) and Maggie (Lauren Cohan), who are captured by members of Negan's group known as the Saviors. It marks a turning point in an ongoing plot arc for Carol, one of the most ruthless members of Rick's (Andrew Lincoln) group, who is forced to re-examine herself as she is confronted by a remorseless killer named Paula (Alicia Witt).

== Plot ==
At night, out in the woods, Carol stops Maggie from joining the gun battle against the Saviors and, as they confront each other, are approached by a Savior named Donnie (Rus Blackwell). Carol shoots Donnie in the left arm before she and Maggie are surrounded, surrendering to three other Saviors: Paula, Michelle (Jeananne Goossen), and Molly (Jill Jane Clements). As day breaks, Paula's group observe Daryl capturing a Savior named Primo, and, to stop the savage beating inflicted on him, Paula tells Rick, over a walkie-talkie, that they have captured Maggie and Carol. Rick tries to negotiate for a prisoner exchange, but, while Donnie needs the medical attention Primo could provide, Paula feels they are at a disadvantage against Rick's group and decides to withdraw.

While awaiting reinforcements and deciding their next move, Paula and her group bring Carol and Maggie to a former slaughterhouse, where the Saviors have cached supplies guarded by trapped walkers. Carol puts on an act of being frightened and weak-willed, while revealing that Maggie is pregnant in an effort to protect her. Donnie suffers excruciating nerve damage from a tourniquet and tries to physically take out his frustrations on Carol, but is pistol-whipped by Paula, who tells Donnie that she doesn't blame him and casually accepts the violence. Paula then tells Carol that she is willing to kill as many people as necessary to stay alive; Carol is horrified to see herself in Paula.

Over the walkie-talkie, Paula directs Rick to a location for a prisoner exchange, but believes he is being duplicitous and tracking them. Paula, Michelle, and Molly prepare to flee the moment their reinforcements arrive or to ambush Rick's group should he get to the slaughterhouse first. Left unguarded, Carol is able to free herself and Maggie, who insists on killing their captors. They use a zombified Donnie, who has succumbed to his wounds, to ambush Molly, taking her handgun and beating her to death. Paula eventually catches them as they negotiate a gauntlet of walkers, but Carol gets the upper hand and wounds Paula as the walkers get loose. Maggie fights Michelle, who slices at her stomach with a knife; Carol then shoots Michelle dead. Paula then fights Carol, who impales her on a spike and leaves her to be devoured by a walker. Carol then takes Paula's radio and imitates Paula's voice to tell the Savior reinforcements to meet them on the kill floor. There, Carol traps five Saviors, burning them alive with gasoline and a lit cigarette.

Killing the walkers on their way out, including a now-zombified Paula, Maggie and Carol get to the entrance just as their own group arrive. Glenn and Daryl embrace them. Carol admits to Daryl that she is not okay, while Maggie tells Glenn that she "can't anymore." With all of his friends dead, Primo tells Rick that he is Negan, but Rick, without hesitation, shoots the bound prisoner in the head as a stunned Carol looks on.

== Production and writing ==
The slaughterhouse set was custom-built for filming.

== Reception ==
=== Critical reception ===
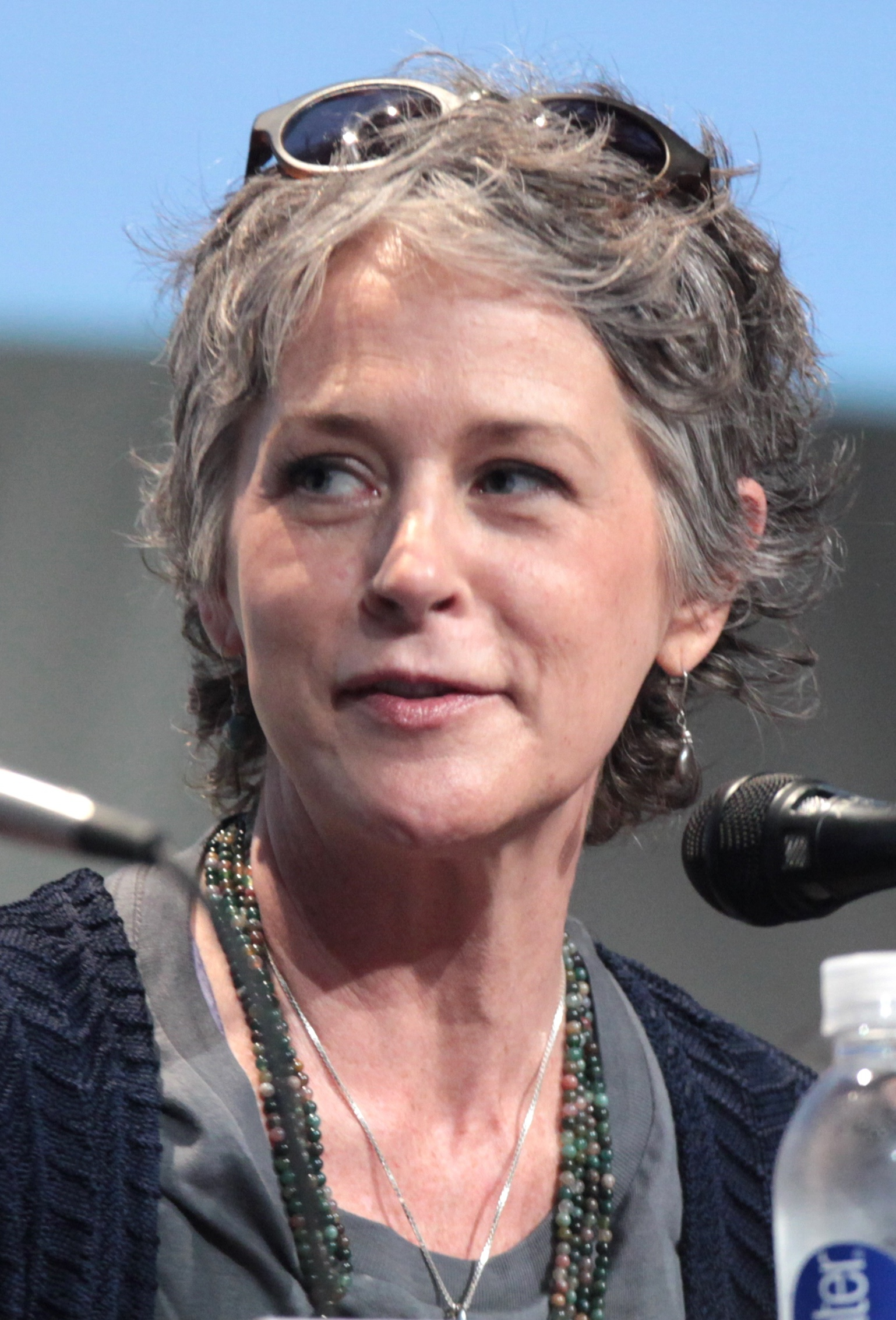
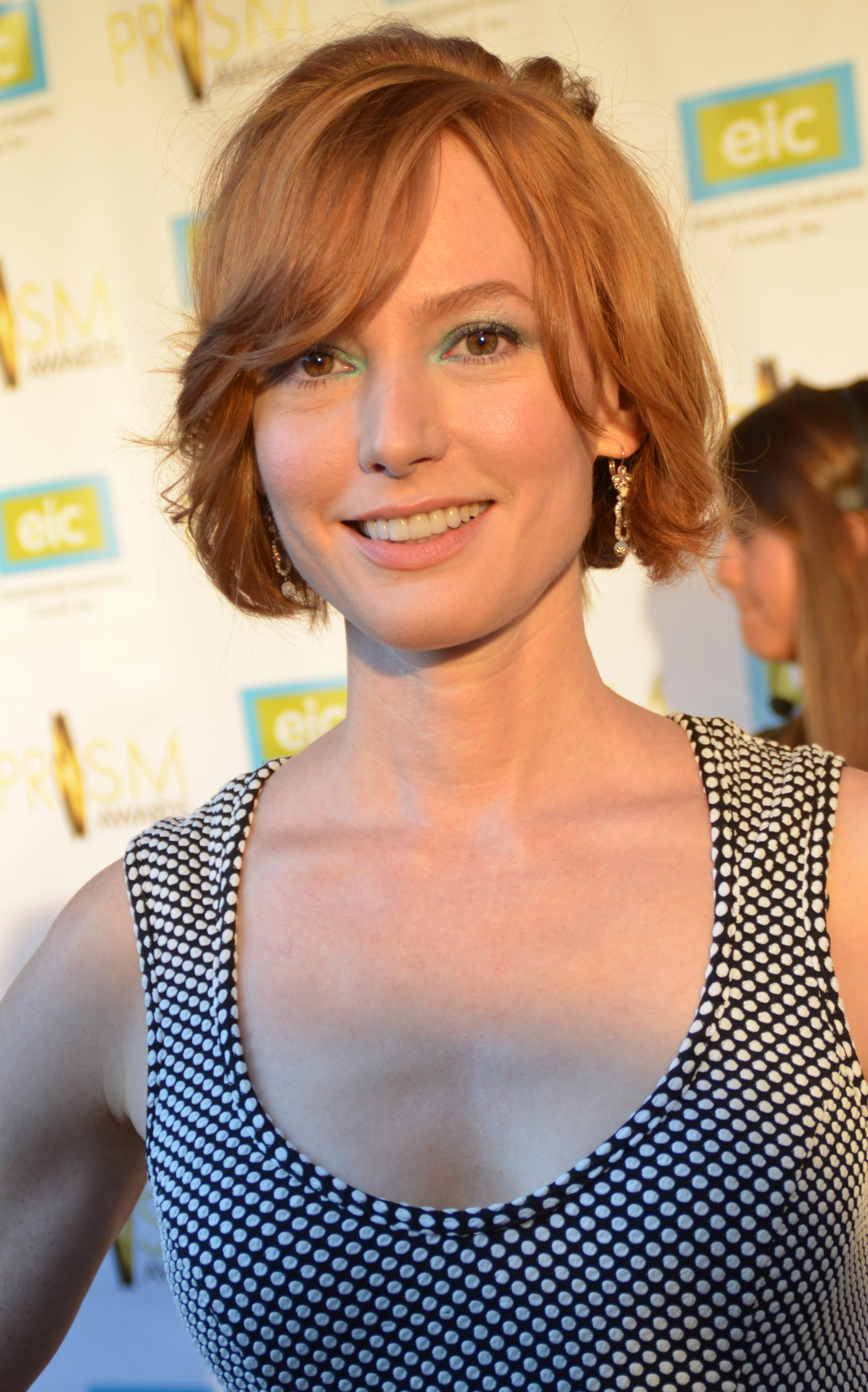
Melissa McBride (left) and Alicia Witt (right) both received critical acclaim for their performances.

The episode received critical acclaim, with the performances of Melissa McBride and Alicia Witt being singled out for praise. On Rotten Tomatoes, it holds a 97% with an average rating of 8.26 out of 10, based on 31 reviews. The critics' consensus reads: "The Same Boat" takes a strong female focus by continuing Carol's arc while deepening viewer anticipation for Negan's ominous arrival.

Matt Fowler from IGN gave it 9.3 out of 10. He praised McBride and Witt's performances, and the episode's tension. Jeremy Egner of The New York Times commented positively on the complexity of Carol's division between ruse and real emotion, writing: "Like always, Carol did whatever necessary to survive and protect her cohorts, and did so in particularly brutal fashion [...] but she seems increasingly unable to avoid reckoning with the toll. "Are you O.K.?" Daryl asked when he arrived. "No," she responded, and that was before Rick executed the remaining Savior right in front of her. It's going to take more than a few Hail Marys to make that image, among many others, go away."

TVLine named Alicia Witt their "Performer of the Week", praising her performance in the episode, while McBride was named "Performer of the Week" by Collider.

Lenika Cruz and David Sims of The Atlantic called it the "most overtly feminist episode thus far" and "was an elegantly written and executed bottle episode, designed largely to subvert the trope of the helpless woman". Laura Prudom from Variety praised the episode and wrote that it is "an incisive chamber piece that serves as a compelling analogue to last week's "Not Tomorrow Yet" in its surprisingly deep examination of moral relativism, ably penned by Angela Kang and directed with claustrophobic intensity by Billy Gierhart".

=== Ratings ===
The episode averaged a 6.0 rating in adults 18–49, with 12.53 million viewers overall.
