= Family Movie =

American comedy horror film

- Directed by: Kyra Sedgwick; Kevin Bacon
- Screenplay by: Dan Beers
- Produced by: Kevin Bacon; Kyra Sedgwick; Sosie Bacon; Travis Bacon; Vince Jolivette; Casey Durant; Greg Lauritano; Russell Wayne Groves; Benjamin Fuqua; John Lang
- Starring: Kevin Bacon; Kyra Sedgwick; Sosie Bacon; Travis Bacon; Liza Koshy; John Carroll Lynch; Jackie Earle Haley; Andrea Savage; Austin Amelio; Scoot McNairy
- Cinematography: Mac Fisken
- Edited by: Bryan Gaynor
- Music by: Travis Bacon
- Production companies: 100 Zeros; Filmopoly
- Distributed by: Variance Films
- Release dates: March 13, 2026 (SXSW); April 23, 2027 (United States)
- Running time: 81 minutes
- Country: United States
- Language: English

Family Movie is a 2026 American comedy horror film directed by Kyra Sedgwick and Kevin Bacon and written by Dan Beers.

== Cast ==
- Kevin Bacon
- Kyra Sedgwick
- Sosie Bacon
- Travis Bacon
- Liza Koshy
- John Carroll Lynch
- Jackie Earle Haley
- Andrea Savage
- Austin Amelio
- Scoot McNairy

== Production ==
In November 2024, it was announced that actors Kevin Bacon and Kyra Sedgwick would direct Family Movie, while also starring with their real life children Sosie Bacon and Travis Bacon. In January 2026, it was revealed that Liza Koshy, John Carroll Lynch, Jackie Earle Haley, Andrea Savage, Austin Amelio, and Scoot McNairy rounded out the cast.

== Release ==
Family Movie premiered at the SXSW on March 13, 2026.

On August 19, 2026 it was announced that Variance Films had acquired theatrical domestic distribution rights for the film with plans to release it on April 23, 2027 with Neon International handling international sales.
