= Negan =

Character in The Walking Dead

Negan Smith
- The Walking Dead character
- Negan as he appears in the comic book series (left) and Negan Smith as portrayed by Jeffrey Dean Morgan in the television series (right)
- First appearance: Comic: Issue 100 (2012); Television: "Last Day on Earth" (2016)
- Last appearance: Comic: "Negan Lives!" (2020)
- Created by: Robert Kirkman; Charlie Adlard
- Adapted by: Scott M. Gimple; Matthew Negrete (The Walking Dead)
- Portrayed by: Jeffrey Dean Morgan
- Voiced by: Jeffrey Dean Morgan (Tekken 7)

In-universe information
- Occupation: Gym Teacher; Leader of the Saviors; Comic: Member of the Militia; Television: Worker for the Alexandria Safe-Zone
- Weapon: Wired bat ("Lucille")
- Spouses: Lucille (deceased); Television: Annie (second wife)
- Significant others: Sherry; Amber; Frankie; Tanya (only named in the TV Series); Television: Alpha
- Children: Television: Joshua Smith

Negan is a fictional character in the comic book series The Walking Dead, its self-titled television adaptation, and its spin-off series Dead City. The character is fully named Negan Smith in the television series. He initially appears as an antagonist, the leader of a raider clan called the Saviors who subjugate other survivor communities and force them to pay tribute; later, he becomes an antihero. In the comics, the character's appearance is based on Henry Rollins, as confirmed by artist Charlie Adlard. Jeffrey Dean Morgan portrays Negan in the television series, having first appeared in the sixth-season finale. When offered the role of Negan, Morgan immediately accepted, as he was already a fan of the comic book series.

After Rick Grimes and his fellow survivors agree to begin a trading relationship with the Hilltop Colony, they are ambushed by the Saviors and forced to obey Negan's orders to give the Saviors half of their supplies, as the other communities do. Initially obedient, Rick and his group conspire with other communities in the Washington, DC area to prepare for war against the Saviors. Negan is eventually defeated by this alliance and incarcerated for years, until the Whisperers emerge as a threat to the communities. Transformed into an antihero, Negan kills the Whisperers' leader Alpha and participates in subsequent battles, earning himself a pardon to live alone in exile. While Negan has no further role in the comic books, the character returns in the final season of the television series and the spin-off Dead City. In the latter, he is partnered with Maggie Greene as a protagonist.

Morgan has received critical acclaim for his portrayal of Negan in the television series, earning the Critics' Choice Television Award for Best Guest Performer in a Drama Series, MTV Movie Award for Best Villain, and Saturn Award for Best Guest Starring Role on Television. Although the character himself initially received a mixed reception as the main antagonist of Seasons 7 and 8, with some critics calling him "ridiculous", his redemption arc in the later seasons has caused him to become viewed by many as among the best and most well-developed characters in the series.

== Creation ==
Robert Kirkman conceptualized the character after discarding the idea of Rick Grimes being forced to protect his son, Carl, by killing fellow survivor Glenn Rhee. The character's appearance is based on Henry Rollins, as confirmed by artist Charlie Adlard.

Jeffrey Dean Morgan was cast as Negan in 2015. Before Morgan's casting, Matthew Lillard and Henry Rollins also auditioned for the role; the choices were narrowed down to Lillard and Morgan with the latter receiving the role. Morgan immediately accepted, as he was already a fan of the comic book series. He made his television debut as Negan in the sixth-season finale.

== Comic book series ==
=== "Here's Negan" ===
Prior to the outbreak, Negan is the gym teacher of a high school in Reston, Virginia, where he has received complaints due to his use of vulgar language. He is happily married to his wife, Lucille, but nonetheless has a mistress who does not know he is married. During an argument, Lucille collapses and he rushes her to the hospital, where she is diagnosed with cancer. As his wife is tended to, Negan tells his mistress the truth, and she immediately leaves him. When the zombie apocalypse starts, the hospital workers tell Negan they are being forced to evacuate but he refuses to abandon Lucille who is dependent on life-support machines. Lucille dies during a power outage and reanimates as a zombie. Negan flees the hospital and kills zombies who had trapped a boy. In return, Negan asks the boy to kill Lucille for him.

The boy kills the zombified Lucille and Negan begins to bond with the boy, offering him life advice. However, a zombie suddenly appears and kills the boy. Negan is then shown surviving in the apocalypse, travelling alone. Caught trying to steal gas from a group of men, he befriends them and they travel together for a time until the others are all killed in a zombie attack. Negan uses a baseball bat he'd admired to kill the zombies. Time passes and other people meet Negan and travel with him but each is eventually killed by zombies, leaving Negan emotionally numb.

Negan is approached by Dwight who brings him to a camp of survivors. They attempt to overwinter in a hotel but are overrun by zombies, and Negan assumes a leadership position as they fight their way out. Later, Negan de-escalates a confrontation with another group and encourages them to join together. However, learning that the other group prostitutes its women, Negan gets into an argument with their leader. Physically provoked, Negan kills the man by bashing his skull with the bat. Seeing everyone's shock, Negan encourages their fearfulness. Wrapping the bat in barbed wire, he dubs it Lucille and his group the Saviors, and allows the new group to work for them in exchange for protection. Otherwise, he promises that anyone who tries to get in their way will answer to Lucille.

=== "A Larger World" ===
Members of the Hilltop Colony relate that they'd accepted a deal with Negan: the Saviors would use the weaponry that Hilltop was lacking to kill any zombies wandering near the Hilltop; in return, the Saviors would obtain half of Hilltop's supplies, such as livestock and crops. Negan punishes even the smallest infraction (real or perceived) with brutal violence; for example, he orders the death of Hilltop's leader, Gregory, because he feels Gregory is not sufficiently loyal.

=== "Something To Fear" ===
Negan, along with 50 other Saviors, subdues Rick Grimes's group (Rick, Carl, Glenn, Maggie, Michonne, Rosita, Aaron, and Eugene). Negan forces the group to kneel and informs them that they must pay for the Saviors that they killed. Negan imposes a binding deal: everything that belongs to the Alexandria Safe-Zone now belongs to the Saviors. Negan also introduces his weapon of choice: Lucille, a baseball bat covered in barbed wire.

After a long talk about his new world order and whom he should beat to death using Lucille, he ultimately chooses Glenn as his victim. Negan slams Lucille down and laughs as Glenn attempts to get to his feet. After Glenn addresses his final words to Maggie, Negan swings Lucille at him, breaking his skull and knocking out an eye, and beats Glenn to death.

Negan tells the group that the Saviors will be back in one week to collect half of everything they have, threatening more deaths should they refuse. Rick vows to avenge Glenn by killing Negan, amusing the latter, who beats Rick with his bare hands in response before he and the other Saviors leave the group to mourn over Glenn's body.

=== "What Comes After" ===
Negan and the Saviors arrive at the Alexandria Safe-Zone for their tribute, first killing the zombies in the area. Having each house searched, Negan decides not to take any food as he doesn't want Alexandria to starve. The Saviors leave with other supplies, but, unbeknownst to them, Carl hides in their truck with an assault rifle. Once the Saviors return to their base, the Sanctuary, Carl is discovered and he uses the rifle to kill six Saviors. They surround him, and he demands to speak with Negan. When Negan arrives, Carl fires at them until he loses control of the weapon. Dwight is about to kill Carl when Negan stops Dwight and says, "Is that any way to treat our new guest?"

Negan shows interest in getting to know Carl, providing him a tour of the Saviors' facilities, revealing that he is the leader of a cult-like domain of selfless followers who bow to his every word and command. Many followers in his ranks are living on a point system in order to sustain their lives, though many give in to his graces in exchange for a better lifestyle, most notably the women in his "harem", whom he considers his wives.

Negan demands Carl to remove the bandages on his face, which reveals that he is missing an eye from a gunshot wound. Negan, in a state of disbelief and awe, jokingly mocks the disfigurement and goes as far as to ask Carl if he can touch the part of his skull showing through the exposed eye-socket, which causes Carl to break and cry. Negan apologizes, seeing that he has found a weakness in the child he finds so dangerous.

In a ritualistic fashion, complete with call-and-response chanting as Negan's words are answered by his followers, Negan demonstrates that he punishes whoever displeases him by searing their faces with a hot iron. In this case, it is the face of Amber's former lover Mark, who is left disfigured in the same manner as Dwight, with a portion of his face permanently scarred and an eyeball exposed. After the ritual, Negan dismisses his congregation before leading Carl away, contemplating what to do with him.

Negan and Rick meet on the road while travelling toward each other's communities. Negan taunts Rick about showing him "what he has done to his son". Rick, in a fit of rage, attacks Negan who defends himself and returns Carl in healthy condition.

=== "March to War" ===
Several days later, Negan arrives at Alexandria ahead of schedule; he is informed that Rick went scavenging for supplies. Negan is approached by Spencer Monroe who says that Rick is not a suitable leader for the community. He asks that, once Negan assassinates Rick, he be given control of the community. Negan responds by telling Spencer that Rick may hate him, but, he has guts, unlike Spencer, who acted like a coward. Negan then disembowels Spencer, killing him.

When Rick returns with supplies, Negan initially demands all of it but then decides to take nothing, as repayment for having killed Spencer. Rick insists that they take their share, and Negan does so. As the Saviors begin driving back to the foundry, Negan notices Rick and a few others exiting the gate. An instant later, his driver is shot and killed. Confused and angry, Negan takes Lucille and sees Rick pointing a gun at his head. Suddenly, a gunshot is heard, and Rick's gun is destroyed as well as those of the others who followed him. Negan remarks on how stupid Rick's people are to use bullets on the zombies instead of saving them for the living. Negan reveals that before every pickup, he has a back-up team surround Alexandria and guard the area. With a crazed smile on his face, Negan says that Rick and his people are "fucking fucked."

Noting that snipers give away their position, Negan says that Rick's "sniper bitch", Andrea, is "as good as dead", provoking Rick to strike him. As Negan holds him off, Carl shoots off a portion of Lucille, causing the Saviors to open fire at Alexandria's walls. Negan orders them to stop, and issues an ultimatum: "Give me the boy, or I'll bash in all four skulls of the people out here!" Negan admits that he liked Carl and that if he had a child, he would have wanted him to be like Carl. Rick says that if Carl dies, their agreement is over, but Negan states that it already is over. He orders his men to line up Rick, Heath, Nicholas, and Holly, then begins to decide which one to kill first. He notices a figure falling from the bell tower and taunts Rick about Andrea's supposed demise. Nicholas interrupts him, pleading for his life, and Negan calls him a coward. He invites Rick, Heath, or Holly to ask him to kill Nicholas and says if they do so, he will spare them. Heath refuses, and so Negan begins to pick which one of them he will kill.

Negan is interrupted when Paul "Jesus" Monroe grabs a Savior as a human shield. Negan tells his men to stand down, and when he does this, Jesus leaps out of a trench and kicks the nearest Savior in the face. Jesus orders Rick and the others into a trench and proceeds to fight his way towards Negan. When Jesus reaches Negan, he manages to disarm him and hold him hostage. Jesus stalls the Saviors until Ezekiel and his men arrive. Negan breaks free from Jesus and runs to a truck, where he retreats back to the Sanctuary with his men. Negan is later seen back at the Sanctuary, where he gives the Saviors a speech about their being the dominant force in the world, and the need to remind people of that. Negan then states they are going to war.

=== "All Out War" ===
Several days later, Rick's army arrives at the Sanctuary, the Saviors' foundry base. Rick demands that Negan come out and offers him a chance to surrender and spare the women and children in his community. Negan refuses Rick's offer, and reveals that Gregory has renewed his loyalty to the Saviors, placing Hilltop under Negan's control. After Hilltop fighters withdraw, gunfire is exchanged. Negan orders Dwight to summon reinforcements from the outposts. As more men rush outside, Negan notices that Rick's militia are shooting at the Sanctuary's windows, and a herd of zombies is approaching. Suddenly, Holly drives through their fence, destroying a portion of it and allowing the zombies inside. Negan orders his men back inside the foundry but notices that Holly is still alive. He sees a zombie about to kill her and dispatches it. As she looks up, Negan smiles and says that she was not "going to get off that fucking easy." As the zombies converge on the courtyard area, the Saviors retreat inside the foundry to develop a new strategy.

Negan delivers an analogy to a group of Saviors about destroying a man's heart by destroying the woman he loves; Negan clearly believes that Rick and Holly love each other. She corrects him but Negan refuses to believe. Making it a priority to clear the courtyard of zombies, he orders regular forays to thin their numbers, taking part in one himself. He then goes to interrogate Holy and catches David attempting to rape her. Negan angrily reminds David "We don't rape" and stabs David in the neck. He then apologizes to Holly, telling her that "they [the Saviors] aren't monsters."

Negan learns of an outpost being overrun by Rick's army and sends men to fortify the remaining ones. This, in turn, leads to Ezekiel's army being eradicated in a failed attack. Having eliminated the zombies besieging the Sanctuary, Negan leads his army to Alexandria and throws a grenade over the wall, demolishing one of the houses to get Rick's attention. He insists that he is there to talk and sends a blindfolded Holly as a supposed peace offering. Rick calls to Holly to guide her inside their gates. However, Holly is a zombie and bites Denise, at which point Negan signals the Saviors to attack. Negan throws additional grenades over the wall as his men move to surround Alexandria. However, gunfire erupts from behind several buildings as Maggie brings reinforcements from the Hilltop. Negan uses a last grenade for cover and the Saviors retreat. Briefly stopping a safe distance away, Negan notes the smoke coming from Alexandria and declares that they've "just fucking won."

Negan and the Saviors encounter some Alexandrians whom they rescue from zombies and take prisoner. He learns that Eugene Porter was making ammunition for Rick's army and orders him to do so for the Saviors. Eugene refuses, despite Negan's threats. Negan has the Saviors contaminate their weapons with zombie fluids to infect their enemy, and prepares to attack Hilltop. The Saviors breach Hilltop's defences and begin killing the residents. Negan spots Rick and orders Dwight to shoot him, which he does. Negan then regroups with the main Savior force and prepares to attack the Hilltop mansion, but they are forced to retreat. Assuming that Rick will die from infection and that Rick's forces will be lost without their leader, Negan believes victory is his.

Negan returns to Hilltop and offers to accept their surrender, and is stunned when Rick appears. Negan asks Rick to surrender, to "let things go back the way they were". Rick refuses, and counter-offers that they pool resources and manpower, and engage in trade through a barter system. Negan acknowledges that the death toll has become too large and agrees with Rick. Rick then slashes Negan's throat with a knife. Negan tackles Rick and begins beating him, breaking Rick's leg and laughing at it before passing out. He awakens in a room with Rick standing over him. Rick reveals that he is keeping Negan alive to see their new civilization thrive without him, and that he will spend the rest of his life in jail.

=== "A New Beginning" ===
Two years after the war, Carl visits Negan who has been kept locked behind bars in a basement in Alexandria. They have spoken frequently and Carl still wants to kill Negan though Negan considers them to be friends.

Negan asks Rick if he is taking Carl to the Hilltop, slightly shocking Rick. Negan says that he and Carl are friends and that Rick could not break that bond. Negan tells Rick that he is just getting things ready for him and that he will not be in his cell forever. Rick says that he knows Negan will die behind bars, to which Negan says that he will not and that deep down, Rick knows he should have killed Negan.

Magna and her group later investigate the jail. Negan asks if they have come to rescue him, saying that "they're animals." Negan begs to be released and claims Rick is a monster who locked him away and tortured him for speaking out against him. However, Magna does not believe him, having seen actual victims of torture. Negan admits he was lying but had to give it a try.

=== "Life and Death" ===
Following routine maintenance, Negan's cell door is not locked properly and he realizes that he is free to escape. Negan decides to remain in his cell with the door open. When Rick arrives, Negan taunts him about the numerous ways he could have destroyed Alexandria, but claimed to stay as sign of good faith and an offering of trust. As Rick locks the cell and leaves, Negan taunts him again by stating that the only reason he is alive is so Rick can prove to himself that he is still a good person, and that he wants everyone else to believe he is the only one who can fix the world.

=== "No Turning Back" ===
After a tumultuous community meeting about Rick's proposed plan regarding the Whisperers, Rick goes to Negan's cell and asks for his help. Rick tells Negan everything that has happened since they came into conflict with this new group. Negan advises Rick to keep his group happy, even if that means lying to them, touting his expertise as leader of the Saviors, some of whom disliked him. Rick leaves, and Negan grins. When Negan hears the chants and cheers of Rick's name at a later town meeting, Negan smiles and says, "atta boy."

=== "Call to Arms" ===
While in his cell, Negan is visited by Brandon Rose, a young Hilltop resident who bears a grudge against Rick, Carl, Sophia, and the Whisperers; Rick had killed his father as an act of self-defense, Carl assaulted him after he had attacked Sophia, and Alpha beheaded his mother. He proposes to help Negan escape and the two enter Whisperer terrain. Brandon explains that he wants Negan to pit Rick and the Whisperers against one another. In response, Negan stabs Brandon in the chest and proceeds alone. Shortly afterward, Negan is ambushed by a group of Whisperers led by Beta, who brings him to Alpha. Negan introduces himself and declares his love for Alpha. Negan starts to live with the Whisperers, though Beta is suspicious. Negan stops two Whisperers from raping a woman but is knocked down by Beta for interfering. Alpha explains that they allow for things like this to happen for women to prove their strength, which angers Negan. Later that night, Negan and Alpha have a private conversation where Negan reveals how the world has made him dead inside and that he knows Alpha is only pretending to have no emotions, causing Alpha to break down. Alpha says that maybe Negan does belong with the Whisperers after all. Negan then slits Alpha's throat and decapitates her, musing "wait until Rick gets a look at you...".

=== "The Whisperer War" ===
A week after disappearing, Negan returns to Alexandria with Alpha's severed head and shows it to Rick and Andrea, asking for their trust. He declares that he has become inspired by Rick's way of thinking and that he wants to fight beside Rick, not against him. Rick agrees to let Negan live free – in an outpost, alone, with only enough to survive – after fighting against the Whisperers. Negan is warned that if he returns to his old ways, he will be immediately killed, and Dwight is assigned to watch over him. Sent to the front lines without a weapon, Negan takes a rifle from a dead man and uses it to thwart Beta from attacking Dwight. Negan is given Lucille, which he uses to beat Beta until the bat breaks.

=== "A Certain Doom" ===
Negan saves Rick when Alexandria is overrun by the Whisperers' zombie horde. While sheltering with Rick, Negan reflects on the things he's done, the people he's seen die and leaving his wife as a zombie. When former Saviors arrive and declare themselves independent, Negan's presence unnerves them enough that their hostages are able to free themselves. Negan convinces the former Saviors to avoid violence, reminding them what their lives were like under his rule and explaining that sooner or later, the communities will need each other's help again.

=== "Lines We Cross" ===
Negan gathers some supplies per his agreement with Rick, and leaves Alexandria without a goodbye. He returns to Lucille's grave, saying that he has no other place to go and weeps. Confronted by Maggie at gunpoint, Negan apologizes for Glenn's death and empathizes with her. He holds her gun to his head and begs her to kill him, but she refuses and tells him he must live with all he's done.

In the Letter Hacks for Issue 182, Kirkman confirmed that Negan would not return to the series. When asked if Negan would receive another barbed-wire baseball bat, Kirkman answered, "If we see Negan again - and we won't - I'd be really surprised if he had a bat with him. It feels like he put that behind him in his last appearance."

=== "Rest in Peace" ===
In the final issue, set 20 years later, it is revealed that Negan is still alive. He avoids all contact with the other survivors, living on food parcels left by Carl and maintaining a state of mourning for his wife Lucille.

=== "Negan Lives!" ===
Taking place between Issue 174 and the final issue, "Negan Lives!" is a one-issue short story focusing on Negan. Negan encounters a young woman named Lucy who bonds with him, but she lures Negan into a trap for her group. After a zombie attack kills Lucy's companions, Negan invites Lucy to join him on a quest to properly lay his wife Lucille to rest.

== Television series biography ==
=== Backstory ===
In season 8, Negan vaguely states that he helped young people improve upon their weaknesses and molded them into stronger individuals. In the season 10 episode "Here's Negan", he is portrayed as having been a high school gym teacher. Negan later met a woman named Lucille and the pair fell in love and married. Over time, however, Negan began cheating on her. She found out about the affair and he begged her forgiveness, which she granted. Around this time, Negan assaulted the father of students for insulting his wife, and was dismissed from employment. In the onset of the outbreak, Negan searched and obtained medicine for Lucille's pancreatic cancer but when he returned she had died and reanimated as a zombie. He cannot bring himself to kill her zombie, an inaction which haunted him as a weakness of character and drove him to become a much stronger person.

Sometime after the outbreak, Negan established himself as the tyrannical dictator of a community of survivors called the Saviors. He wields a baseball bat wrapped in barbed wire that he calls "Lucille", after his deceased wife. Negan quickly gathered a large following and established outposts in various locations around the Washington, DC, area. Within the structure of the Saviors, Negan has a right-hand man named Simon as well as several lieutenants, including Wade, Bud, Gavin, Arat and Dwight. One of Negan's first Saviors and lieutenants was a man known only as "the Croat" who had gone through some terrible experiences before Negan found him. Negan would employ the Croat's unique talents as a torturer and he became close friends with the man, who came to call Negan buraz or "brother." At some point, Negan and the Saviors encountered the Hilltop Colony and extorted its leader Gregory into giving them half their supplies on a regular basis; failure to do so would result in the Saviors killing members of their community. To set an example, his goons used a baseball bat to beat a 16-year-old resident named Rory to death, after which Gregory submitted to Negan's demands. Negan and his men also made contact with the community known as the Kingdom and made a similar agreement with their leader King Ezekiel. However, near the start of their relationship, the Saviors found what Negan believed to be a drifter near the Sanctuary. Disobeying Negan's direct orders to let her go, the Croat brutally tortured and killed the young woman who confessed to being a Kingdom scout. Negan disfigured the Croat's right ear in an attempt to kill him, later calling him a monster, and the Croat fled and eventually formed his own group in Manhattan. At some point, Dwight fled the Saviors with his wife Sherry, sister-in-law Tina, and a truck full of supplies. Negan subsequently sent out a large group, led by Wade, to retrieve them and the stolen supplies.

=== Season 6 ===
The Saviors become the main antagonists during the second half of season 6, with their leader Negan having an air of mystery as he is mentioned several times prior to his first appearance in the season finale. His name is first heard in "No Way Out" when a group of bikers, led by a man named Bud, accost Daryl Dixon (Norman Reedus), Abraham Ford (Michael Cudlitz), and Sasha Williams (Sonequa Martin-Green), and attempt to steal their weapons, but Daryl kills them with a rocket launcher.

Rick and his group kneel before Negan.

In the season finale, "Last Day on Earth", while driving the ailing Maggie Greene (Lauren Cohan) to the Hilltop, Rick Grimes (Andrew Lincoln) and his group run into multiple roadblocks set by the Saviors, which eventually causes Rick's group to travel by foot. While walking through the woods, the group is ambushed by a large contingent of the Saviors led by Negan's right-hand man Simon (Steven Ogg), who take Rick and his group's weapons and make them get on their knees.

Dwight also brings out Daryl, Glenn Rhee (Steven Yeun), Michonne (Danai Gurira), and Rosita Espinosa (Christian Serratos), and makes them get on their knees, as well. Negan then comes out of their RV and tells Rick that he must give him all of his possessions, and that Rick and everyone else at Alexandria work for Negan now; he "owns" them. Because Rick's group killed a lot of Saviors, Negan tells Rick's group they have to be punished, and he is going to beat one of them to death with "Lucille", a baseball bat wrapped in barbed wire. Negan chooses the victim in a game of "Eeny, meeny, miny, moe", which he recites while pointing Lucille at each member of the group, before landing on an unseen individual, saying, "you are it." Negan warns the group not to say anything or to move, and he begins to beat the unseen individual to death, as everyone else in the group screams.

=== Season 7 ===
Negan's chosen victim is Abraham, whom he bludgeons to death with Lucille. Enraged, Daryl rushes Negan and punches him in the face, only to be stopped by three Saviors. As a reprisal for Daryl's attack, Negan beats Glenn to death in front of Maggie, Glenn's wife. Negan then presents Rick with an ultimatum: pledge total loyalty, or the rest of the group will die. When Rick remains defiant, Negan threatens to kill Rick's son Carl (Chandler Riggs) and the rest of the group unless Rick cuts the boy's arm off. After some hesitation, Rick raises the axe; Negan stops him, satisfied that he has broken Rick's spirit. Negan then allows the surviving members of the group to depart with the warning that the Saviors will return in a week to collect their supplies. As insurance against further retaliation, Negan takes Daryl hostage.

Negan is shown to rule the Sanctuary (the main Savior stronghold) through fear and rewarding his personal army of enforcers (who identify themselves as "Negan" in a show of loyalty). He keeps Daryl locked in a cell and hopes to break his spirit and mold him into one of his Saviors, but Daryl refuses to submit. Negan and his men arrive at Alexandria earlier than expected. He forces Rick to give him a tour and hold Lucille. Both Rick and Father Gabriel (Seth Gilliam) lie to Negan that Maggie is dead in order to protect her from Negan.

Negan later talks Carl out of shooting a Savior, and decides to take all of Alexandria's guns. When two guns go missing from the inventory, Negan threatens to kill Olivia (Ann Mahoney) unless they are found. This is later resolved when Rick finds them as well as a hunting rifle which was not in the armory. Impressed, Negan states that "this is something to build a relationship on" before telling him to find them something interesting for next time. Before leaving, Negan takes back Lucille and tells Rick that "I just slid my dick down your throat and you thanked me for it".

Negan meets his men returning with supplies from the Hilltop. They are attacked by Carl, who kills two of the Saviors and demands Negan come forward. Negan is nonchalant about the imminent danger to him, but develops a respect for Carl. He later has Carl uncover his eye and makes fun of his injury, but shows remorse and apologizes when this upsets Carl. He has Carl witness him burn Mark (Griffin Freeman), a Savior who has displeased him, with a hot iron to teach everyone a lesson about "following the rules". He then decides to bring Carl back to Alexandria, where they wait for Rick.

Negan is approached in Alexandria by Spencer Monroe (Austin Nichols), who attempts to bond with him over whiskey and a game of billiards. The two seem to hit it off, until Spencer tells Negan about how dangerous Rick is and that Spencer should be in charge for both of their sakes. Negan states that while Rick hates him, he respects that Rick was brave enough to threaten him and swallow his pride to protect others. Disappointed that Spencer "has no guts" for going to him while Rick is gone, Negan eviscerates Spencer with a knife while jokingly stating that "he did have guts after all." This provokes Rosita, Spencer's girlfriend, to draw a gun and shoot at Negan, though she misses and instead hits Lucille. Enraged, Negan threatens to have Rosita's face mutilated unless she tells him where she got the bullet. When she refuses, Negan tells his lieutenant Arat (Elizabeth Ludlow) to kill someone, and she kills Olivia. Rick, having just arrived, sees this and demands to know what happened. Negan calmly replies that he has tried to be reasonable as he returned Carl unharmed and killed Spencer for Rick. When Eugene Porter (Josh McDermitt) confesses to making the bullet, Negan takes him prisoner and tells Rick that he is "way in the hole" for this incident no matter how many supplies they gather. The Saviors leave, and Rick realizes he has to convince the other communities to form an alliance to stop Negan.

Negan reappears in "Hostiles and Calamities" where he greets Eugene entering the Sanctuary. After determining that Eugene is indeed highly intelligent, Negan allows him to get comfortable within the Sanctuary and even sends him two of his wives to provide him with companionship. When Negan discovers that Sherry (Christine Evangelista), one of his concubines, is gone, he suspects her of freeing Daryl and has her former husband Dwight (Austin Amelio) beaten and thrown in a cell. When Negan is convinced that Dwight was not involved and is loyal to him, he sends Dwight after Sherry, only to learn that she supposedly was killed by zombies. When Negan finds evidence (secretly planted by Dwight) that Dr. Carson aided in Daryl's escape, Negan throws him in the fire-pit before apologizing to Dwight for doubting him, and offering condolences for his loss.

Negan visits a captive Sasha (who came to the Sanctuary to kill him) and discovers one of his Saviors, David (Martinez), attempting to rape her. Negan states that rape is against their rules and that he will not tolerate such behavior. David apologizes, but Negan rams a knife through his throat, stating he does not "accept his apology". He then apologizes to Sasha and replaces the T-shirt that David ripped before complimenting her on her brazen attack. After confirming Rick did not sanction it, Negan states that she would make a welcome addition to the Saviors. He then leaves her with a knife and a choice: kill herself or kill David once he reanimates to show that she is willing to work with him. He later returns to find, to his delight, that she has killed David. He takes the knife back and informs her that she is on the right path before stating he knows Rick is conspiring against him as he has a spy in his midst.

Negan leads a convoy of Saviors to Alexandria with Simon, Dwight, Eugene and Sasha in tow with plans to force Rick's submission. He reveals that the Scavengers (a group of survivors Rick paid to help them) are actually working for him as they hold Rick at gunpoint. Negan brings a coffin forward and reveals Sasha is inside, stating they can have her back alive and he will let most of them live if they meet his demands, which include all their weapons, Daryl returned to him and for Rick to pick someone to be killed by Lucille. He opens the coffin to find Sasha has died and reanimated as a zombie. After fending her off, the situation devolves into a gunfight. Negan manages to capture Rick and Carl, and prepares to kill Carl. However, the Saviors are ambushed by forces from the Kingdom and Hilltop, led by King Ezekiel (Khary Payton) and Maggie. Caught off guard by Rick's reinforcements and rapidly losing men, Negan orders a retreat. Once back at the Sanctuary, he questions Eugene as to how Sasha died in the coffin (suspecting foul play on his part) before declaring to the assembled Saviors that they are going to war.

=== Season 8 ===
Negan appears in the season premiere, "Mercy", when Rick leads an army of assembled survivors outside the Sanctuary. More amused than worried, Negan refuses to march his people out to fight Rick just to prove "that my dick is bigger than yours". Rick offers Negan's lieutenants and the Saviors inside the chance to surrender, but states that Negan still has to die. Negan attempts to divide them by having Hilltop Governor Gregory (Xander Berkeley) order his people to withdraw, but this tactic fails. The allied army opens fire at the Sanctuary walls while Negan and his people take cover. They are then surprised by a massive herd of zombies lured by Daryl; the gates are blown open and the herd funnels inside. Negan becomes trapped in a trailer with Gabriel.

"The Big Scary U" opens in the Sanctuary prior to Rick's attack with Negan meeting with his chief lieutenants. When Simon suggests they destroy one of the communities entirely, Negan becomes incensed, stating that people are critical to what they are building. He instead wants to capture and publicly execute Rick, Maggie and Ezekiel to cow their people into submission. The episode then returns to Negan and Gabriel in the trailer, discussing their views on survival. When encouraged by Gabriel to confess his sins, Negan is evasive until he finally admits his greatest regret was his treatment of his first wife prior to the outbreak, stating she died of cancer and he could not bring himself to put her down. The two manage to escape by "gutting up" and Negan is able reassert control of the spiraling situation in the Sanctuary.

Negan returns to Alexandria to exact revenge, and is met by Carl (who, unbeknownst to Negan, is dying from a zombie bite) who attempts to dissuade him from attacking and even offers to be killed to spare the rest. He questions Negan if this is what he wanted or the person he wanted to be, and Negan appears emotional. However, upon learning Carl's confrontation was merely to distract the Saviors, Negan angrily orders his army to fire their weapons, and he confronts Rick upon his arrival. After a brutal hand-to-hand fight, he throws Rick through a window. Rick retreats into the sewers with Michonne and the rest of the Alexandrians.

Negan meets with Simon to handle the matter of the Scavengers. Simon assumes he wants them exterminated, but Negan instead wants him to give them the standard warning and kill only one. Rick later contacts Negan via walkie-talkie, and informs him that Carl has died, and that his last wish was for the communities to make peace, something Rick sees as impossible. Genuinely saddened by the news, Negan offers Rick his condolences before asking him to surrender to prevent further warfare, to no avail. Negan begins preparing the Saviors for an attack on Hilltop to end the war.

Negan devises a plan to coat their weapons in zombie flesh to spread the contagion. He leads a convoy of Saviors to the Hilltop when his car is rammed by Rick, who pursues him into an abandoned building. Negan attempts to fight back, but falls through the floor and loses Lucille. Unarmed and being hunted in the dark, Negan attempts to make a deal, offering to forgive Rick's transgressions and reduce the Savior's cut of supplies in exchange for peace. Rick refuses, stating that Negan cares for nothing except Lucille, which he then proceeds to light on fire. Negan furiously attacks Rick before the two are surrounded by zombies and flames, forcing Negan to reclaim Lucille and flee — only to be captured by Jadis (Pollyanna McIntosh), who tortures Negan until he reveals that he had nothing to do with the massacre of her people. He manages to talk her into freeing him while she is getting ready to receive a helicopter at the junkyard.

Negan makes his way back to the Savior compound to find that Simon has been ruling in his stead, and is responsible for the bloodshed at Jadis's compound. He regains control by challenging Simon to a fight and killing him with his bare hands, and making Dwight the instrument of his revenge against Rick by forcing him to lure Rick's group into a trap with false information. Michonne contacts Negan via walkie-talkie and reads him a letter Carl wrote him before he died, urging a peaceful solution to the conflict; though moved by the message, Negan refuses, and swears he will kill Rick and every last one of his group. Rick's group arrive to challenge the Saviors. Negan orders his men to open fire, but discovers that Eugene has tampered with their weapons, rendering them helpless. Rick's group kills several of Negan's men, while Rick and Negan have a final battle that ends with Rick cutting Negan's throat open. However, Rick decides to save his enemy's life, as he believes it is what Carl would want.

=== Season 9 ===
18 months later, Rick goes down a basement to talk to an imprisoned Negan, telling him about how everything has changed since the war ended, and how the communities are working together on fixing a bridge, which will be the link to their future. Negan warns him that the peace between the communities will not last, and that he will not be locked up forever.

When Michonne visits Negan to get him to end a hunger strike, he tells her about his late wife, Lucille, and says he is thankful that she is not alive to see him in his current state. She finally gets him to eat, and as she leaves he asks to see his bat. Michonne tells him they do not have it anymore, and leaves smiling as he bashes his head against the wall in anguish. Maggie arrives in Alexandria and arranges to see Negan in his cell, intent on killing him. Negan taunts Maggie about killing Glenn, but then bursts into tears and begs her to put him out of his misery so he can be reunited with his wife. She tells him to get back to his cell, because he is already "worse than dead".

Six years later, Negan remains a prisoner in Alexandria, but has apparently accepted his fate, and has even struck up a friendship with Judith Grimes (Cailey Fleming), Rick's young daughter. Negan helps Judith with her homework and, when she asks for advice regarding Magna's group, tells her a story from his childhood where he tried to take in stray dogs only for it to go badly. Negan also receives weekly visits from Gabriel, who tries to help Negan become a better person. Negan responds by taunting Gabriel about his new relationship with Rosita, but Gabriel reveals that Rosita is at the Hilltop, hurt, and he cannot go to her because he has to look after Negan. Chastened, Negan makes an apparently sincere apology for his behavior.

Later, Negan realizes that his cell door is unlocked, and escapes. Judith tries to stop him, but lets him go after he persuades her that he will not hurt anyone else. Negan wanders through the changed world, losing his food following an encounter with two zombies and inadvertently returning to the clearing where he murdered Glenn and Abraham. Negan gets a new leather jacket from an abandoned clothing store, but is nearly killed by a pack of feral dogs in the process. Negan finally returns to the Sanctuary, only to find it completely abandoned and all of the Saviors gone. Negan tries to adapt to life alone, but eventually abandons the Sanctuary and his old life for good and returns to Alexandria. Confronted by Judith, Negan admits that she was right that there is nothing left for him outside and he is willing to return to his cell rather than be alone. Negan then allows Judith to take him back to Alexandria.

Negan is visited by Michonne after Judith disappears. Negan's cell now contains a bookshelf with several books and a small seat where he can comfortably read. Michonne demands to know what Negan talks to Judith about, and he admits to telling her stories about Carl, Rick, and the war, stories which Judith has never heard from anyone else. Negan points out that Judith would be able to tell if he was lying so he is always honest with her, even when she asked about Glenn and Abraham. Negan urges Michonne to listen to and be honest with her daughter and helps her realize that Judith went to try and help her friends.

Negan is moved out of his cell during a winter storm, as he would freeze to death otherwise. Negan is the first to realize that something is wrong, leading to Eugene to discover that a chimney is clogged. Though everyone contemplates leaving Negan to die, they take him with them as they travel to Aaron's house. However, Judith hears Daryl's dog barking and runs into the storm. Negan risks his own life to chase after Judith and save her, finding her by following the barking dog, though his leg is injured by flying debris. Negan saves Judith and the dog, and carries them to shelter.

=== Season 10 ===
Following the storm, Negan is allowed some leeway and works in Alexandria as a gardener and maintenance man under guard, until Gabriel partners him with Aaron (Ross Marquand) to protect Alexandria from repeated zombie attacks. After being attacked by zombies while on patrol, Aaron is temporarily blinded and struggles to a cabin, where he finds Negan, who helps him. The two then return to Alexandria. While defending Lydia (Cassady McClincy) from an attack by a group of thieves called the Highwaymen, Negan kills one of their number, Margo (Jerri Tubbs), in self-defense and faces possible execution. He escapes, aided by Brandon (Blaine Kern III), the son of a former Savior who is a fan of his. After Negan attempts to get a woman and her son to safety at the Hilltop, Brandon kills them both to impress him. Enraged, Negan beats him to death.

Apparently reverting to his old ways and armed with a new Lucille created by Brandon, Negan joins the Whisperers, a rival faction bent on destroying the other communities, and becomes the right hand and lover of their leader, Alpha (Samantha Morton). Negan aids in the attack on Hilltop, having the Whisperers block the roads so that the Hilltop residents cannot easily escape, though Negan tries to convince Alpha to spare their lives and offer them a choice to join her. Following the attack, Negan encounters Aaron, who blames him for the death of his partner Eric (Jordan Woods-Robinson) six years earlier. Negan captures Lydia and brings Alpha to what she thinks is her location, but it is revealed that Negan hid the girl elsewhere to lure Alpha into a trap; he then slits Alpha's throat, killing her. Negan subsequently is accepted by Daryl as a tentative ally of the communities for conducting the execution on Carol's orders. When the final battle comes, Negan at first refuses to take part, knowing that Beta and the other Whisperers will prioritize killing him and going so far as to tell Lydia that it is futile and will end badly. However, Lydia apparently changes his mind and Negan suddenly appears to distract Beta from attacking Lydia, giving Daryl the opportunity to attack Beta. After the battle, Negan tells Lydia that he intends to stay for a while. However, he is dismayed to see that Maggie has returned, and tries to avoid her.

In "Here's Negan", continuing tensions between Negan and Maggie provoke Carol into exiling him to a cabin in the woods. After hallucinating his younger self taunting him, Negan returns to the tree where Rick almost killed him and digs up his old baseball bat Lucille, which has been buried for years. In a series of flashbacks, Negan is depicted 12 years earlier, shortly before the zombie apocalypse, as a former high school gym teacher and the loving but unfaithful husband of a woman named Lucille (Hilarie Burton). After Lucille is diagnosed with cancer, Negan devotes himself to caring for her, but her chemotherapy drugs are ruined when their generator breaks. Negan searches out a group of traveling doctors for help and, six weeks later, finds a doctor named Franklin (Miles Mussenden) and his daughter Laura (Lindsley Register), who give him the drugs he needs; Laura also gives Negan a baseball bat for protection. On his way home, however, he is captured by a biker gang and forced to give up Franklin and Laura's location. Returning home, Negan discovers that Lucille has committed suicide and reanimated as a zombie. Heartbroken, he wraps Laura's bat in barbed wire from his fence and burns his house down with Lucille inside. Returning to the bar where the bikers had held him prisoner, Negan rescues Franklin and Laura and subdues the gang's leader, Craven (Rod Rowland). Negan describes how he had lost his job after beating up a man who was rude to his wife, and tells Craven that, in this new world, he no longer needs to rein in his dark side; he then beats Craven to death with the bat which he has named Lucille.

In the present, Negan kills a zombie with Lucille, but the old bat finally breaks from the blow combined with its brittle condition and the abuse that Negan has put it through. Returning to the cabin, Negan says a final goodbye to Lucille, coming to terms with and apologizing for his mistakes. After burning Lucille in the fireplace, Negan returns to Alexandria to live full time, despite Carol's warnings that Maggie will kill him if he stays. As Negan reenters Alexandria, he smirks at a glaring Maggie.

=== Season 11 ===
In season 11, taking place shortly after "Here's Negan", Negan joins a mission to reclaim Maggie's old village Meridian from a violent group called the Reapers. Maggie takes Negan along ostensibly because of his knowledge of the area, but Negan suspects that Maggie intends to take the chance to kill him. After Maggie threatens him, Negan chooses to let her fall from a train car into a horde of zombies. When Maggie survives the fall, Negan defends his actions as him simply choosing not to save Maggie in order to protect himself.

Following an ambush by the Reapers, most of the team is either killed or separated. During a brief skirmish, Maggie and Negan work together to kill one of the Reapers, but they are subsequently forced to leave behind a severely injured Alden (Callan McAuliffe) in order to continue their mission. Maggie and Negan are forced to rely on each other and often clash, but they prove to be an effective team. They reunite with Gabriel and Maggie's friend Elijah (Okea Eme-Akwari) and devise a plan to lead a zombie horde to destroy the Reapers at Meridian. In exchange for Maggie abandoning her revenge against him, Negan agrees to train Maggie as a Whisperer. Maggie later privately admits to Elijah that she does not know if she can keep her word to Negan, but she hopes that she can. During this time, Negan has a conversation with Maggie about Glenn's death, pointing out that Rick and the others had struck first and massacred some of his people, which he says forced him to respond in kind. Negan admits that if he could do it all over again, he would have killed everyone in Rick's group, as it would have saved the lives of many of his people.

After gathering a massive horde and preparing Whisperer masks, the group marches on Meridian, where they are aided by Daryl, who has infiltrated the Reapers' ranks. However, the assault goes awry when Leah Shaw (Lynn Collins) kills the Reaper leader Pope (Ritchie Coster) and orders a rocket barrage into the courtyard where Maggie, Negan, Daryl, Elijah and the zombies are located. Negan ultimately helps Maggie's group defeat the Reapers, but then leaves on his own upon realizing that Maggie will never let go of her hatred of him.

Six months later, Negan meets and marries a woman named Annie (Medina Senghore), and she becomes pregnant with his child. The two of them are part of the Riverbend community. Negan encounters Gabriel when he is sent there to make peaceful contact for the Commonwealth but the Commonwealth troopers attack with Gabriel deemed expendable. Negan sends out a message to Hilltop, and Maggie leads an expedition to join the fight against the corrupt Commonwealth troopers acting under Hornsby's authority. Negan saves Maggie's son Hershel (Kien Michael Spiller) from being killed by Commonwealth troopers, but the boy condemns him for killing his father and pulls a gun on him, relenting only when Negan admits what he did, apologizes and points out it would put all the innocents in Riverbend at risk. After defeating the Commonwealth troopers, Maggie sees that having a family has changed Negan for the better, and slowly begins to trust him.

Negan and Daryl infiltrate the Commonwealth while wearing Whisperer masks. Negan seeks out Michael Mercer (Michael James Shaw), the head of Commonwealth's security force to advise him of the situation. When Milton's narcissistic son Sebastian (Teo Rapp-Olsson) goes on the run after being revealed as part of a scheme to force impoverished members of the community to undertake risky missions to recover valuable items, Negan and Carol save him from angry Commonwealth residents and bring him to his mother. Nevertheless, Milton does nothing to help Negan when her treacherous right-hand man Lance Hornsby (Josh Hamilton) imprisons him, Annie, and Ezekiel in Commonwealth's labor camp.

The camp's sadistic warden (Michael Weaver) singles Negan out for his harshest abuse, determined to break him and use him to keep the other prisoners in line, but Negan remains defiant and makes an uneasy alliance with Ezekiel to plan an escape. Negan actually plans to confess so the warden will execute him, in hopes that this will spark a prisoner revolt; however, the warden threatens to kill both Negan and Annie, which causes Negan to passionately plead for her life. Ezekiel then pleads to the troopers not to kill anyone, and many others join him to stand in front of Negan and Annie. When the warden orders everyone standing with Ezekiel to be shot, the troopers refuse. Negan and Ezekiel convince the soldiers not to let the warden turn them into murderers, and they turn on their hated boss. Daryl, Maggie, Gabriel, and Rosita then arrive and kill the warden who has taken a hostage.

In the series finale, "Rest in Peace", Negan joins the coalition of soldiers and freed prisoners to fight Milton as a herd of zombies head toward the Commonwealth. He and Maggie act as snipers, picking off zombies that get too close to the community's main gates, which Milton has sealed to protect her own home while leaving thousands of residents to die as the zombies swarm in. After Mercer overthrows and arrests Milton, she attempts to feed herself to a zombiefied Hornsby, but Negan and Maggie save her life after deciding that, for Milton, life in prison would be a far worse punishment than death.

After the horde is destroyed, Negan speaks with Maggie. He expresses remorse for killing Glenn and says that, after nearly losing his wife and unborn child, he finally understands what he did to her. Maggie replies that she will never forgive him, but she will try to move past her anger for her own sake and that of her son. Negan accepts her decision, and he and Annie leave the Commonwealth to begin a new life.

=== The Walking Dead: Dead City ===
==== Season 1 ====
Negan is recruited by Maggie to help rescue her son Herschel from zombie-infested Manhattan. Herschel is being held hostage by the Croat, a former member of the Saviors who leads a violent group called the Burazi which has begun raiding other communities. Negan agrees on the condition that Maggie's community accepts Ginny, a mute young woman who has been under his protection. Negan also hopes to use the opportunity to thwart his pursuit by the Marshalls of New Babylon Federation, who have orders to execute him for the murder of five men, and to settle his unfinished business with the Croat, whom he had tried to kill due to the Croat's defiance in using torture.

Negan returns to some of his old ways in encounters with the Croat's men, such as brutally murdering a prisoner as a show of intimidation to avoid greater bloodshed. Maggie, while benefiting from Negan's murderous charisma, gains a new perspective on Negan and the Saviors.

Negan and Maggie are separated during a failed infiltration of the Burazi stronghold, and Negan lures the Croat away. The Croat attempts to reconcile with Negan and offers a gift in the form of Perlie, the last surviving Marshall hunting Negan. To the Croat's dismay, Negan instead saves Perlie's life and escapes with him. As the two struggle through the city, Negan reveals that the men he killed in New Babylon had brutally attacked his wife and Perlie becomes disillusioned. They find Maggie and Ginny. Ginny speaks, expressing her desire to stay with Negan, who reveals that he killed Ginny's father while trying to convince her to return to New Babylon with Perlie.

It is revealed that Maggie planned to trade Negan to the Croat in exchange for Hershel, breaking their trust. Nonetheless, Negan willingly goes through with the exchange, asking Maggie to look after Ginny. The Croat introduces Negan to the Dama, his mysterious ally who wants Negan to be their hero in uniting New York and conquering more territory. Dama reveals Hershel's severed toe and threatens to go back for more if Negan does not comply.

==== Season 2 ====
A year later, Negan reluctantly agrees to lead the Burazi when Dama threatens Annie and Joshua. Negan tries to persuade the survivor gangs of New York to join the Burazi during a meeting in St. Patrick's Cathedral, shocking rival Christos with an electric prod built into a new Lucille built for Negan by the Croat.

Negan leads the Burazi in attacking the New Babylon Army as it arrives in Manhattan, but stops when he sees Hershel. Due to this, the Dama executes Negan's friend Victor the following day. While hunting the invaders in Central Park, Negan saves Hershel from one of the Burazi. Later, while the Burazi make an alliance with Bruegel at the Metropolitan Museum of Art, Negan finds that Maggie and Perlie have infiltrated the museum. Negan warns them to be careful as Hershel has been informing on them to the Burazi.

Negan tries again to get Christos to join the alliance, becoming reluctant when he realizes that Christos is only trying to protect the families comprising his group. However, the Croat massacres his entire group on the belief that they sabotaged vital power lines. Negan sows division between the Croat and the Dama, including killing the Dama's pet rat, resulting in a violent argument and the Croat abandoning the Dama to die in an accidental fire. Realizing Negan was responsible, the Croat attacks him but Negan overpowers and exiles him, with Negan taking control of the Burazi.

Negan is visited by Maggie to inform him that Bruegel plans to betray him. Annie and Joshua arrive, but Negan sends them away for safety. Ginny then confronts Negan and tries to kill him, but collapses from an infected wound. Negan takes Ginny to Bellevue Hospital and, failing to find antibiotics, puts her on a ventilator to give her time to recover. Determined to show no mercy in protecting those important to him, Negan sets an ambush and Bruegel's gang are killed by the Burazi and a zombie herd. Negan captures the sole survivors, Bruegel and Perlie, and brutally executes Bruegel after playing eeny, meeny, miny, moe similar to when he killed Abraham and Glenn. Maggie stabs Negan to save Perlie, but stops when Ginny appears as a zombie, which is killed by Negan. Maggie accepts that she has to let go of her revenge to move forward. Maggie, Negan and Perlie vow to build a better future, recognizing that their only way forward is together.

==== Season 3 ====
Following the loss of Ginny, Negan becomes depressed and displays a more nihilistic outlook. Captured by siblings Renata and Luis, Negan refuses to join their mission to save a baby until Maggie asks for his help. Mortally wounded blowing up his methane power plant to stop the New Babylon Army, the Croat dies in Negan's arms, but gives his last tank and the plans to build more to Maggie, Negan, Hershel, Renata and Luis. Maggie and Negan finally make peace with each other before he departs.

Over the following weeks, Negan resides at the Fram, a bar run by eccentric survivor and former cop Mason Dillard. While Maggie and her new friends work to build a new community, Negan remains isolated, spending his days drinking, playing Gears of War 2 and trying to help Dillard reconnect with the living. Negan helps Maggie and Perlie to take down the Dama and later secretly kills her, framing the Dama's death as a suicide. Negan tells Maggie that in order for her to make the new community work, she will need a lot more people, inspiring Maggie to light the Statue of Liberty as a beacon to draw in other survivors. Negan repeatedly refuses to join the community as he feels that Renata can't handle being in charge and Maggie should take over. However, both Negan and Dillard help on several occasions with tasks such as walker wrangling. Negan suggests that he and Maggie could've been friends "in another life."

In an alternate reality where the zombie apocalypse never happened, Lucille died of her cancer and Negan became a business consultant with an estranged son. Negan also spent two years in prison for assaulting Alan, a man whom he had discovered had an inappropriate relationship with one of Negan's ex-students, leading to her suicide. While visiting Manhattan for Christmas, Maggie meets Negan in a diner and they quickly become friends. Negan shows Maggie around the city, shares his honest opinions of her chances of saving the family farm and opens up about his past. Negan also reveals that he intends to kill Alan, but Maggie stops him. While visiting a Christmas market, Maggie and Negan meet a fortune teller who determines that Maggie and Negan are stuck in a karmic cycle and have had several lives together. The fortune teller suggests that fate has brought the pair together repeatedly to learn a lesson that they haven't learned yet and that they can bring out the best versions of each other. After going their separate ways, Negan calls his son and makes plans to bring him to Manhattan for the holidays, but gives into his darker instincts and kills Alan. While with Negan, Maggie is inspired to sell the farm and find a new life for herself, but finds herself falling back into her sense of responsibility after learning that the loan for her co-op plan has been approved.

In the post-apocalyptic world, things come crashing down for Maggie and Negan when Negan kills a man named Fabian, earning him the ire of Renata. Negan had killed Fabian to protect Maggie and Renata after learning that Fabian planned to kill them, but it violates the rules of the community, leading to Renata insisting upon bringing Negan in dead or alive. Complicating matters, Negan kills Dillard's walker pets, causing him to go completely insane, frame Negan for attacking him, and join Renata in trying to kill Negan. No longer wanting Negan dead, Maggie attempts to find a peaceful solution while Luis tries to talk his sister down. In the process, it's revealed that Renata is dealing with trauma and guilt over the Croat murdering her uncle and younger brother which she partially blames Negan for as Negan had trained the Croat.

Renata eventually sees reason, but Dillard murders her and begins hunting Negan with the help of his friends, the Dead Squad, forcing Maggie, Negan and Hershel to go on the run. With Dillard threatening to kill innocent people to get at Negan, he attempts to sacrifice himself to get Dillard to stand down. In the same alley where they met the fortune teller in the alternate reality, Maggie tells Negan that she will never forgive him for killing Glenn, but Maggie has finally moved passed it and along with Hershel, Negan is the closest thing to family that she has left. Together, Maggie, Negan and Hershel defeat the Dead Squad and save the community. In a final confrontation, Negan attempts to talk his former best friend back to reality, not wanting to kill him. However, Dillard is too far gone, and Maggie is forced to kill him to keep Dillard from killing Negan with Lucille. Honoring Dillard's wishes, Maggie and Negan leave him to reanimate and join the undead.

Following this, Negan finally joins Maggie's community, taking over Dillard's bar and moving into the apartment building where everyone else lives. A week later, Maggie approaches Negan about becoming the head of security which he accepts and Maggie pins Dillard's old police badge on Negan's chest. Maggie suggests that with Manhattan effectively reclaimed by the living, they should move on to the rest of New York City and gives Negan a new mission.

=== Fear the Walking Dead ===
==== Season 8 ====
Negan appears in several flashbacks in "Sanctuary" when Dwight and Sherry return to the Saviors' long-abandoned stronghold.

== Other appearances ==
Although first believed to be too weak by game director Katsuhiro Harada, Negan appears as a playable guest character in the fighting video game Tekken 7, added as the sixth and final part of the second season pass on February 28, 2019, with his appearance based on his television counterpart; Jeffrey Dean Morgan reprised his role. Negan appears as a playable character in Brawlhalla. Negan appears as an outfit in Fortnite with a design based on his comic rendition.

== Reception ==
The character of Negan has been praised by both fans and critics as an antagonist of the series.

Jesse Schedeen wrote several pieces for entertainment website IGN on Negan's early appearances in the comic. He called Negan "a worthy addition to the book's cast" with a fresh and distinctive voice, and that the series benefitted from "a truly awful antagonist" like The Governor. After four issues, he wrote that Negan was "quickly giving the Governor a run for his money in the villainy department." Writing on the issue in which Negan shows Carl Grimes around the Sanctuary, Schedeen stated:

There's a palpable tension as we wonder what fate Negan has in mind for his young enemy. But even at his most sinister, Negan remains strangely charismatic. It is not difficult to understand how he managed to build such a lofty position for himself, complete with multiple wives and the total devotion of an entire town.

Noel Murray of Rolling Stone ranked Negan 10th in a list of 30 best Walking Dead characters, praising Morgan's performance and the direction in portraying shocking violence. He noted, "The alarming ease of his cruelty and the rigors of his organization represent a worldview that's been both fascinating and frightening to explore." Negan was ranked third on TV Fanatic's list of "21 Sexy TV Characters Deserving of a Beach Day." The Telegraph finds Negan as "fancy".

During seasons 7 and 8, Negan was lambasted by some critics as a "complete idiot", "at the center of all the show's problems", and "ridiculous."

The confrontation between Negan and Rick Grimes has been compared to the enduring rivalry between DC Comics characters Joker and Batman. Fans were shocked and disturbed by Negan and Alpha's sex scene in episode 10 of The Walking Dead. Angela Kang of The Hollywood Reporter has stated that "We always felt like we needed some of the story of Alpha, Negan and their strange relationship."
