= Not Tomorrow Yet =

- The Walking Dead episode
- As planned by Rick, Andy pretends to complete the deal with the Saviors by bringing a fake for Gregory's head.
- Episode no.: Season 6 Episode 12
- Directed by: Greg Nicotero
- Written by: Seth Hoffman
- Cinematography by: Michael E. Satrazemis
- Editing by: Avi Youabian
- Original air date: March 6, 2016
- Running time: 43 minutes

Guest appearances
- Merritt Wever as Dr. Denise Cloyd; Corey Hawkins as Heath; Tom Payne as Paul "Jesus" Rovia; Jason Douglas as Tobin; Kenric Green as Scott; Carlos Aviles as Savior Guard #1; Ian Casselberry as Gabe; Vanessa Cloke as Anna; Steven Sean Garland as Older Savior; Jimmy Gonzales as Primo; G-Rod as Large Savior; Myke Holmes as Craig; Ted Huckabee as Bruce; Mandi Christine Kerr as Barbara; Dahlia Legault as Francine; Jeremy Palko as Andy; David Marshall Silverman as Kent

Episode chronology
← Previous "Knots Untie"	Next → "The Same Boat"
- The Walking Dead season 6

"Not Tomorrow Yet" is the twelfth episode of the sixth season of the post-apocalyptic horror television series The Walking Dead, which aired on AMC on March 6, 2016. The episode was written by Seth Hoffman and directed by Greg Nicotero.

== Plot ==
In Alexandria, Carol is shaken when Rick informs her that they must fight. She visits Sam's grave, where she meets with Morgan. They discuss their fight several weeks prior, (Note: As depicted in Start to Finish) and Carol tells him that she convinced Denise, Rosita, and Abraham to stay quiet about the incident under the pretense of protecting Denise.

Rick calls a meeting to discuss Alexandria's deal with Hilltop and recent close calls with the Saviors. Morgan suggests the Saviors may be discouraged from fighting after seeing other communities' willingness to rebel. Rick disagrees, instead planning to annihilate the Saviors in a pre-emptive sneak attack. That night, Carol opens her diary containing a list of people she's killed. While wandering, she finds Tobin, and the two share a kiss.

Abraham prepares to leave Alexandria and breaks up with Rosita, explaining that he has fallen in love with someone else. Later, Rosita reaffirms to Carol her plan to keep the fight with Morgan a secret. Rick, Glenn, Maggie, and Daryl scout a large satellite station which they believe is a Savior stronghold. They devise a plan to enter by pretending to deliver Gregory's head. Alongside Sasha, Heath, and Aaron, the group infiltrates the station and kills several Saviors as they sleep. In one room, Glenn and Heath find a wall of polaroids depicting human corpses with crushed heads. Outside, Tara, Gabriel, and Jesus keep watch. Jesus comforts Tara, who struggles with guilt caused by her time with the Governor.

A surviving Savior injures Abraham and pulls a fire alarm. Carol, angry over Maggie's decision to participate in the raid despite being pregnant, stops Maggie from fighting with Savior reinforcements. Tara and Jesus send Andy back to Hilltop to keep their deal alive and ensure Hilltop isn't blamed for the attack. Jesus then enters the station. An intense firefight ensues that ends with Rick's group victorious.

Daylight breaks, and Tara and Heath depart on a supply run. Back at Alexandria, Morgan builds a detention cell. Michonne surveys the aftermath at the station, wondering which corpse might be Negan. They stop the Savior Primo (Jimmy Gonzales) from escaping on Daryl's bike. While Daryl beats Primo, a female voice comes over Primo's walkie-talkie, ordering them to lower their weapons and revealing that she is holding Carol and Maggie hostage.

== Production ==
This is Alanna Masterson's final appearance in the season due to her maternity leave. She makes a brief reappearance in a dream sequence in the seventh season premiere and returns full time in the sixth episode of the seventh season, "Swear".

One of the severed zombie heads featured in the episode was based on Johnny Depp. Episode director Greg Nicotero said, "I think we had sculpted an emaciated version of a dummy head for something and we used Johnny Depp's head as a basis just for a clay sculpt." This episode features the first appearance of Alicia Witt, who has a voice-only role at the end of the episode. Her casting was announced in February 2016.

== Reception ==
=== Critical reception ===
The episode received critical acclaim. It holds a 96% positive rating with an average score of 8.34 out of 10 on the review aggregator Rotten Tomatoes. The critics' consensus reads: "Not Tomorrow Yet" tests viewers' patience with slow-building tension—and delivers with a powerful, action-packed ending.

=== Ratings ===
The episode averaged a 6.1 rating in adults 18–49, with 12.816 million viewers overall. With Live+7 DVR viewing included, the episode had an overall rating of 18.6 million viewers and a 9.3 in the 18-49 demographic.
