= Scott M. Gimple =

American screenwriter (born 1971)

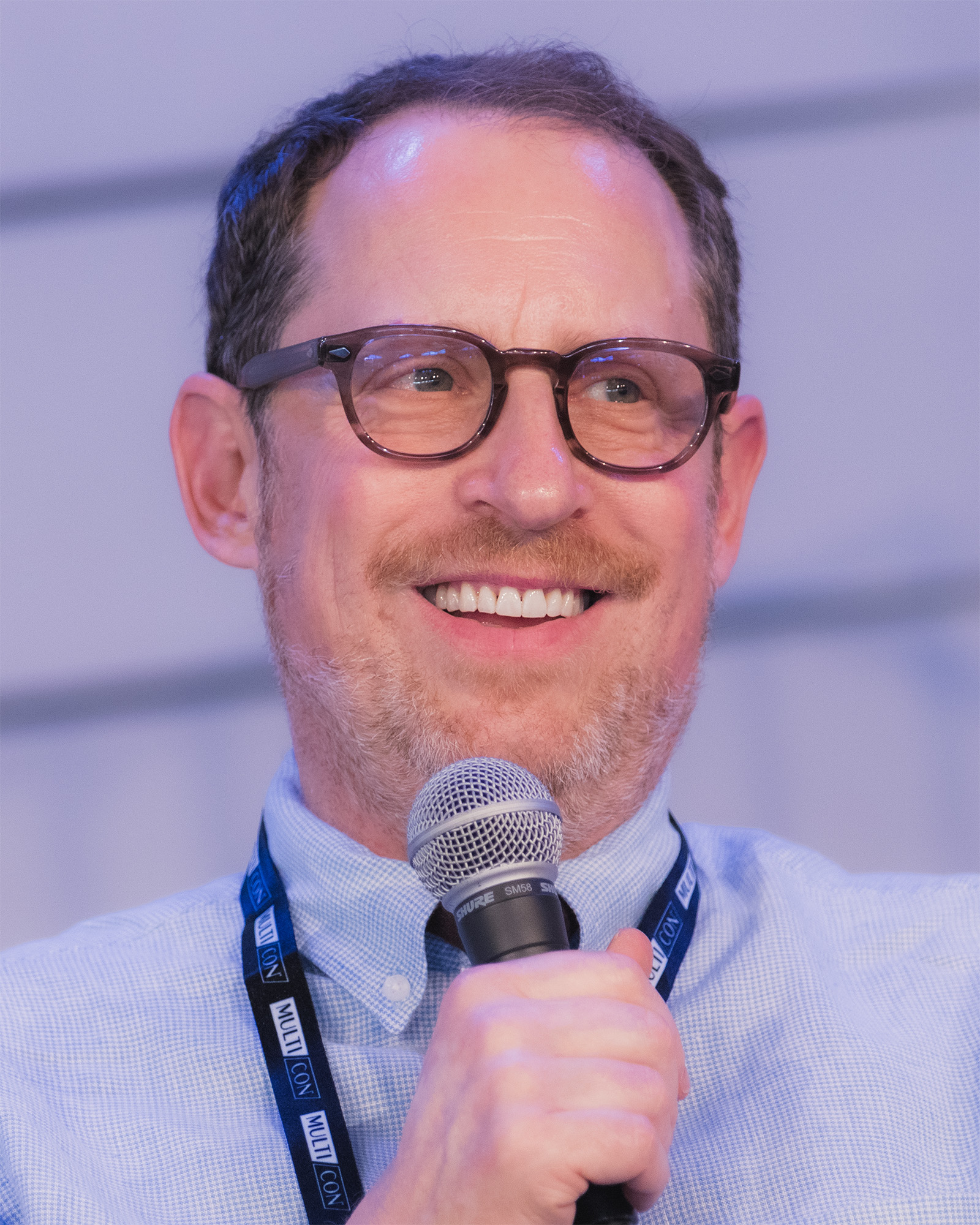
- Gimple in 2026
- Born: Scott Michael Gimple; March 29, 1971 (age 55); Berkeley Heights, New Jersey, U.S.
- Occupations: Writer; producer
- Years active: 1997–present
- Spouse: Julia Wackenheim (m. 2009)
- Children: 1

Scott Michael Gimple (born March 29, 1971) is an American writer for both comics and television. He is known for his work as a writer and producer for Fillmore!, Life, FlashForward, Chase, and The Walking Dead, and served as showrunner for The Walking Dead from seasons 4 through 8 and for the spin-off The Walking Dead: The Ones Who Live.

== Early life ==
Gimple grew up in Berkeley Heights, New Jersey and graduated from Governor Livingston High School. He graduated from the University of Southern California's School of Cinema-Television. He is Jewish.

== Career ==
Gimple was a writer on NBC's Life and Fox TV's Drive, and ABC's FlashForward. He co-wrote the script of Ghost Rider: Spirit of Vengeance alongside Seth Hoffman and David S. Goyer.

In 2011, he joined AMC's The Walking Dead as a producer and writer for the second season. He wrote "Save the Last One", as well as the critically acclaimed "Pretty Much Dead Already", and "18 Miles Out" (with showrunner Glen Mazzara).

In January 2013, Gimple was named showrunner of The Walking Dead, replacing Glen Mazzara. He served as showrunner from the fourth season to the eighth season. During his tenure, he also became an executive producer for Fear the Walking Dead. Gimple left his role as showrunner in 2018 to become the chief content officer for The Walking Dead television series franchise. Gimple has also worked on Disney's Pepper Ann and as a writer for The Simpsons comics, including editing the Simpsons' Episode Guidebook "The Simpsons Forever!: A Complete Guide to Our Favorite Family... Continued". He created the cartoon Fillmore! and the comic book Heroes Anonymous with Bill Morrison.

== Personal life ==
He married actress Julia Wackenheim on August 30, 2009 and they have a son; his wife converted to Judaism upon marrying him.

== Filmography ==
=== Film ===
| Year | Film | Role |
|---|---|---|
| 2012 | Ghost Rider: Spirit of Vengeance | Co-writer |

=== Television ===
Production

| Year | Show | Role | Notes |
|---|---|---|---|
| 2024 | The Walking Dead: The Ones Who Live | Executive producer (showrunner) | |
| 2021 | The Walking Dead: World Beyond | Executive producer | Seasons 1–2 |
| 2020 | The Walking Dead: World Beyond | Executive producer | Seasons 1–2 |
| 2023 | Fear the Walking Dead | Executive producer | Seasons 4–8 |
| 2021 | Fear the Walking Dead | Executive producer | Seasons 4–8 |
| 2020 | Fear the Walking Dead | Executive producer | Seasons 4–8 |
| 2019 | Fear the Walking Dead | Executive producer | Seasons 4–8 |
| 2018 | Fear the Walking Dead | Executive producer | Seasons 4–8 |
| 2018 | The Walking Dead | Executive producer | Seasons 9–11 |
| 2014 | The Walking Dead | Executive producer | Seasons 9–11 |
| 2014 | The Walking Dead | Executive producer (showrunner) | Seasons 4–8 |
| 2013 | The Walking Dead | Executive producer (showrunner) | Seasons 4–8 |
| 2013 | The Walking Dead | Supervising producer | Season 3 |
| 2012 | The Walking Dead | Supervising producer | Season 3 |
| 2012 | The Walking Dead | Producer | Season 2 |
| 2011 | The Walking Dead | Producer | Season 2 |
| 2011 | Chase | Co-producer | Season 1 |
| 2010 | Chase | Co-producer | Season 1 |
| 2010 | FlashForward | Executive story editor | Season 1 |
| 2009 | FlashForward | Executive story editor | Season 1 |
| 2009 | Life | Story editor | Season 2 |
| 2008 | Life | Story editor | Season 2 |
| 2004 | Fillmore! | Creator; Executive producer Dialogue director | Season 2 Season 1 |
| 2003 | Fillmore! | Creator; Executive producer Dialogue director | Season 2 Season 1 |
| 2002 | Fillmore! | Creator; Executive producer Dialogue director | Season 2 Season 1 |

Writer

| Year | Show | Episode | Notes |
|---|---|---|---|
| 2024 | The Walking Dead: The Ones Who Live | "The Last Time" | Season 1, Episode 6 (with Channing Powell) |
| 2024 | The Walking Dead: The Ones Who Live | "Years" | Season 1, Episode 1 (with Danai Gurira and Andrew Lincoln) |
| 2020 | The Walking Dead: World Beyond | "Brave" | Season 1, Episode 1 (with Matthew Negrete) |
| 2018 | The Walking Dead | "What Comes After" | Season 9, Episode 5 (with Matthew Negrete) |
| 2018 | Fear the Walking Dead | "What's Your Story?" | Season 4, Episode 1 (with Andrew Chambliss and Ian B. Goldberg) |
| 2014–2018 | The Walking Dead | "Wrath" | Season 8, Episode 16 (with Angela Kang and Matthew Negrete) |
| 2014–2018 | The Walking Dead | "The Big Scary U" | Season 8, Episode 5 (with David Leslie Johnson-McGoldrick & Angela Kang) |
| 2014–2018 | The Walking Dead | "Mercy" | Season 8, Episode 1 |
| 2014–2018 | The Walking Dead | "The First Day of the Rest of Your Life" | Season 7, Episode 16 (with Angela Kang and Matthew Negrete) |
| 2014–2018 | The Walking Dead | "Bury Me Here" | Season 7, Episode 13 |
| 2014–2018 | The Walking Dead | "The Day Will Come When You Won't Be" | Season 7, Episode 1 |
| 2014–2018 | The Walking Dead | "Last Day on Earth" | Season 6, Episode 16 (with Matthew Negrete) |
| 2014–2018 | The Walking Dead | "East" | Season 6, Episode 15 (with Channing Powell) |
| 2014–2018 | The Walking Dead | "Here's Not Here" | Season 6, Episode 4 |
| 2014–2018 | The Walking Dead | "First Time Again" | Season 6, Episode 1 (with Matthew Negrete) |
| 2014–2018 | The Walking Dead | "Conquer" | Season 5, Episode 16 (with Seth Hoffman) |
| 2014–2018 | The Walking Dead | "What Happened and What's Going On" | Season 5, Episode 9 |
| 2014–2018 | The Walking Dead | "No Sanctuary" | Season 5, Episode 1 |
| 2014–2018 | The Walking Dead | "A" | Season 4, Episode 16 (with Angela Kang) |
| 2014–2018 | The Walking Dead | "The Grove" | Season 4, Episode 14 |
| 2013 | Da Vinci's Demons | "The Prisoner" | Season 1, Episode 3 |
| 2013 | Da Vinci's Demons | "The Serpent" | Season 1, Episode 2 |
| 2013 | The Walking Dead | "30 Days Without an Accident" | Season 4, Episode 1 |
| 2013 | The Walking Dead | "This Sorrowful Life" | Season 3, Episode 15 |
| 2013 | The Walking Dead | "Clear" | Season 3, Episode 12 |
| 2012 | The Walking Dead | "Hounded" | Season 3, Episode 6 |
| 2012 | The Walking Dead | "18 Miles Out" | Season 2, Episode 10 (with Glen Mazzara) |
| 2011 | The Walking Dead | "Pretty Much Dead Already" | Season 2, Episode 7 |
| 2011 | The Walking Dead | "Save the Last One" | Season 2, Episode 3 |
| 2010 | Chase | "The Longest Night" | Season 2, Episode 8 |
| 2010 | FlashForward | "Future Shock" | Season 1, Episode 22 (with Timothy J. Lea) |
| 2010 | FlashForward | "Better Angels" | Season 1, Episode 14 (with Ian B. Goldberg) |
| 2009 | FlashForward | "Black Swan" | Season 1, Episode 4 |
| 2008 | Life | "Did You Feel That?" | Season 2, Episode 6 (with Jonathan Shapiro) |
| 2008 | Life | "Not for Nothing" | Season 2, Episode 4 |
| 2007 | Drive | "Rear View" | Season 1, Episode 6 (with Kristen Reidel) |
| 2007 | El Tigre: The Adventures of Manny Rivera | "Eye Caramba" | Season 1, Episode 13 (story) |
| 2007 | El Tigre: The Adventures of Manny Rivera | "Miracle City Worker" | Season 1, Episode 8 |
| 2007 | American Dragon: Jake Long | "The Love Cruise" | Season 2, Episode 18 |
| 2006 | American Dragon: Jake Long | "The Rotwood Files" | Season 2, Episode 15 |
| 2005 | American Dragon: Jake Long | "The Halloween Bash" | Season 1, Episode 17 |
| 2003 | Fillmore! | "Immune to All but Justice" | Season 2, Episode 5 |
| 2002 | Fillmore! | "Ingrid Third, Public Enemy #1" | Season 1, Episode 8 |
| 2002 | Fillmore! | "Nappers Never Sleep" | Season 1, Episode 7 |
| 2002 | Fillmore! | "A Wurm in Our Midst" | Season 1, Episode 3 |
| 1999 | The Lion King's Timon & Pumbaa | "All Pets Are Off" | Season 3, Episode 14 |
| 1999 | The Lion King's Timon & Pumbaa | "Cliphangers" | Season 3, Episode 39 |
| 1997-2001 | Pepper Ann | "Megablades of Grass" | Season 1, Episode 5A |
| 1997-2001 | Pepper Ann | 5 episodes | Season 2, Eps 4A, 6A, 7B, 8B & 12B |
| 1997-2001 | Pepper Ann | 8 episodes | Season 3, Eps 2B, 6B, 11A, 13B, 15A, 19B, 23A & 24B |
| 1997-2001 | Pepper Ann | 4 episodes | Season 4, Eps 1A, 7, 10A & 13B (with Laura McCreary) |
| 1997 | Jungle Cubs | "Hair Ball" | Season 2, Episode 7 |
