= Austin Amelio =

American actor (born 1988)

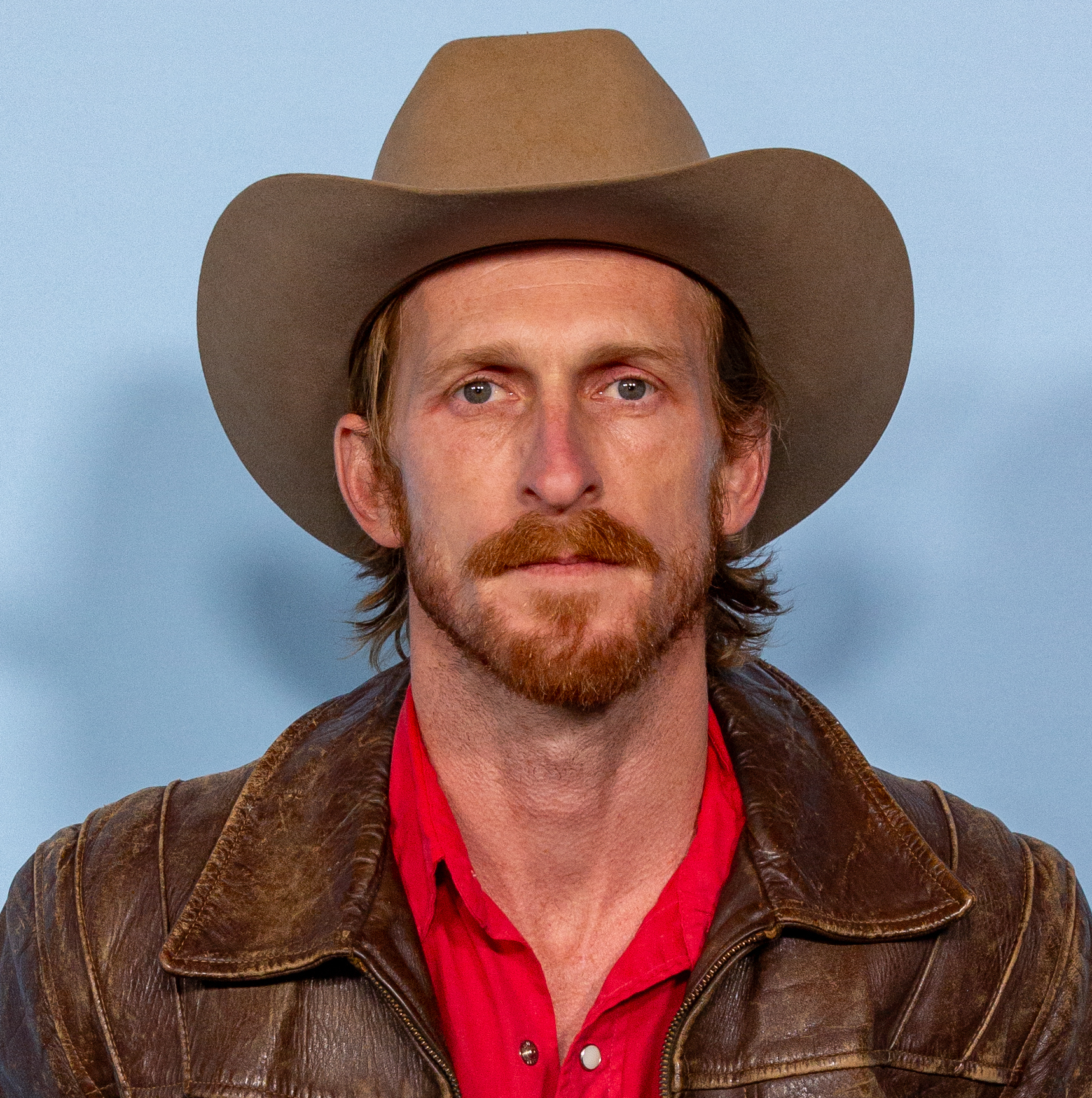
- Amelio in 2025
- Born: April 27, 1988 (age 38); Austin, Texas, U.S.
- Occupations: Actor, skateboarder
- Years active: 2010–present

Austin Amelio (born April 27, 1988) is an American actor and professional skateboarder best known for his role as Dwight in The Walking Dead (2015–2018), its spin-off Fear the Walking Dead (2019–2023), and his role as Nesbit in Everybody Wants Some!! (2016).

== Early life ==
Amelio was born in Austin, Texas.

== Career ==
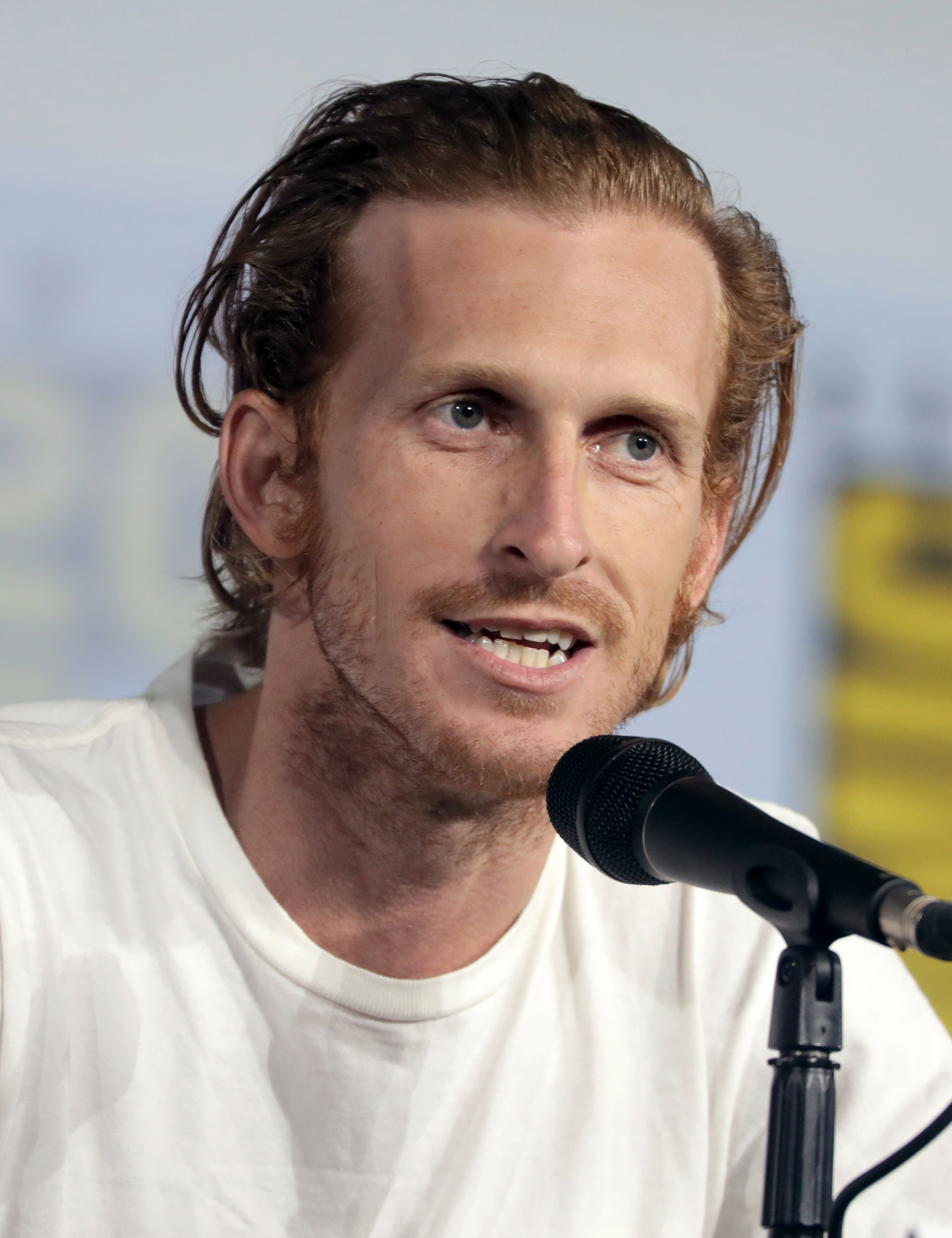
Amelio in 2019

Amelio began his career in an array of short films. His most notable roles are Dwight on The Walking Dead and Nesbit in Everybody Wants Some!!.

== Personal life ==
=== Skateboarding background ===
Amelio was an avid skateboarder, filming a part in and around Austin, Texas, for The Devil's Toy (2011). He was sponsored by No Comply Skate Shop and briefly received free product from Osiris shoes as a flow-sponsored rider. Amelio at one point solicited sponsorship from Karl Watson's Organika brand, also receiving a free deck and some lasting advice from the senior Bay Area skateboarder. In April 2017, Amelio appeared on The Nine Club skateboarding podcast hosted by Chris Roberts, Roger Bagley, and Kelly Hart. He was previously interviewed by Transworld Skateboarding.

== Filmography ==
=== Film ===
Key
†	Denotes films that have not yet been released

Year	Film	Role	Notes
2016	Everybody Wants Some!!	Nesbit	
2017	Song to Song	BV's Brother	
2019	Mercy Black	Will Nylund	
2020	Holler	Hark	
2021	No Future	Preston	
2023	Hit Man	Jasper	
2024	The Reunion	Matt Corcoran	
2025	Bunnylovr	John	
2025	Broke	Nervous Cowboy	
2026	The Weight	Rankin	
2026	Family Movie		
2026	Hokum	The Conquistador	
2027	The Rescue †		Post-production
2027	Alone at Dawn †		Post-production
TBA	Deep Eddy †	Red McHale	Post-production

=== Television ===
Year	Title	Role	Notes
2014	Deliverance Creek	Soldier	Television film
2015–2018	The Walking Dead	Dwight	Recurring, 4 episodes (season 6); Also starring, 18 episodes (seasons 7–8)
2019–2023	Fear the Walking Dead	Dwight	Main cast, 36 episodes (seasons 5–8)
2019–2021	Ride with Norman Reedus	Himself	Guest appearance; 2 episodes
2019	Stumptown	Jack Feeney	Episode: "Missed Connections"
2025–present	When Nobody Sees Us	Andrew Taylor	Main Cast
2026	The Lowdown	Lonnie Reed	
