= Fear the Walking Dead season 1 =

Fear the Walking Dead
- Season 1
- Home media cover art
- Showrunner: Dave Erickson
- Starring: Kim Dickens; Cliff Curtis; Frank Dillane; Alycia Debnam-Carey; Elizabeth Rodriguez; Mercedes Mason; Lorenzo James Henrie; Rubén Blades
- No. of episodes: 6

Release
- Original network: AMC
- Original release: August 23 – October 4, 2015

Season chronology
- Next → Season 2

The first season of Fear the Walking Dead, an American horror-drama television series on AMC, premiered on August 23, 2015, and concluded on October 4, 2015, consisting of six episodes. The series is a companion series and prequel to The Walking Dead, which is based on the comic book series of the same name by Robert Kirkman, Tony Moore, and Charlie Adlard. It was executive produced by Kirkman, David Alpert, Greg Nicotero, Gale Anne Hurd, and Dave Erickson, with Erickson assuming the role of showrunner. On March 9, 2015, AMC announced it had ordered Fear the Walking Dead to series, with a two-season commitment. The second season, comprising 15 episodes, premiered on April 10, 2016.

The season follows a dysfunctional, blended family composed of Madison Clark (Kim Dickens), her fiancé Travis Manawa (Cliff Curtis), her daughter Alicia (Alycia Debnam-Carey), her drug-addicted son Nick (Frank Dillane) and Travis's son Chris (Lorenzo James Henrie) from a previous marriage to Liza Ortiz (Elizabeth Rodriguez). At the onset of the zombie apocalypse, their group is joined by Daniel Salazar (Rubén Blades), his wife Griselda (Patricia Reyes Spíndola), and their daughter Ofelia (Mercedes Mason). The families navigate through Los Angeles in search of a safe haven.

== Production ==
=== Development ===
In September 2013, AMC announced they were developing a companion series to The Walking Dead, which follows a different set of characters created by Robert Kirkman. In September 2014, AMC ordered a pilot, which was written by Kirkman and Dave Erickson, and directed by Adam Davidson, and is executive produced by Kirkman, Erickson, Gale Anne Hurd, and David Alpert, with Erickson serving as showrunner. The project was originally known as Cobalt.

=== Casting ===
In December 2014, the first four starring roles were cast: Kim Dickens as Madison, the female lead; Cliff Curtis as Travis Manawa, the male lead; Frank Dillane as Nick; and Alycia Debnam-Carey as Alicia. In April and May, 2015, Elizabeth Rodriguez and Mercedes Mason were announced as series regulars, both in unknown roles.

=== Filming ===
Production of the pilot episode began in early 2015 and ended on February 6, 2015. The pilot episode was filmed in Los Angeles; the remaining first-season episodes were filmed in Vancouver, British Columbia, Canada. Production on the remaining five first-season episodes began on May 11, 2015. Adam Davidson, who directed the pilot, also directed the series's second and third episodes.

== Cast ==
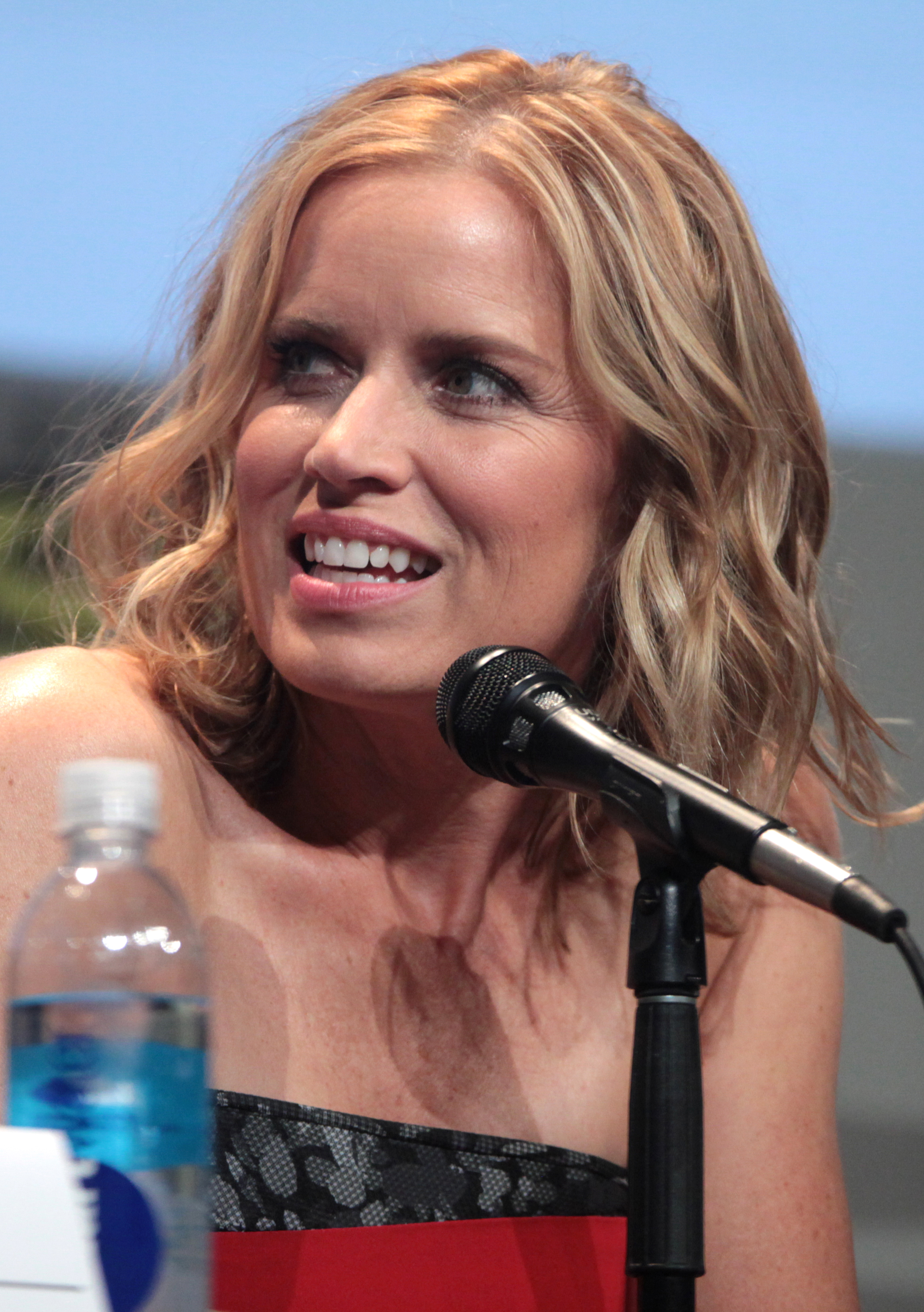
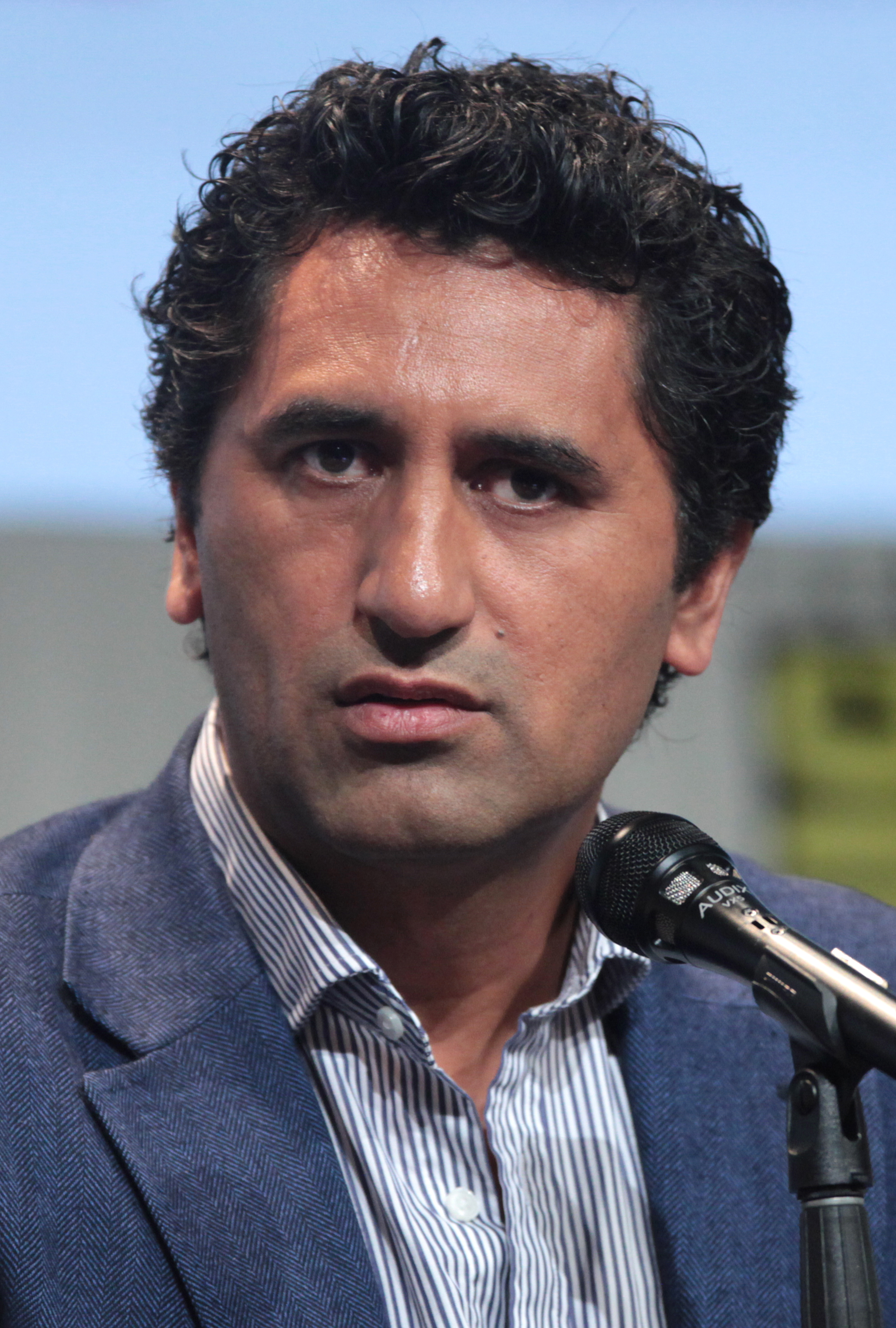
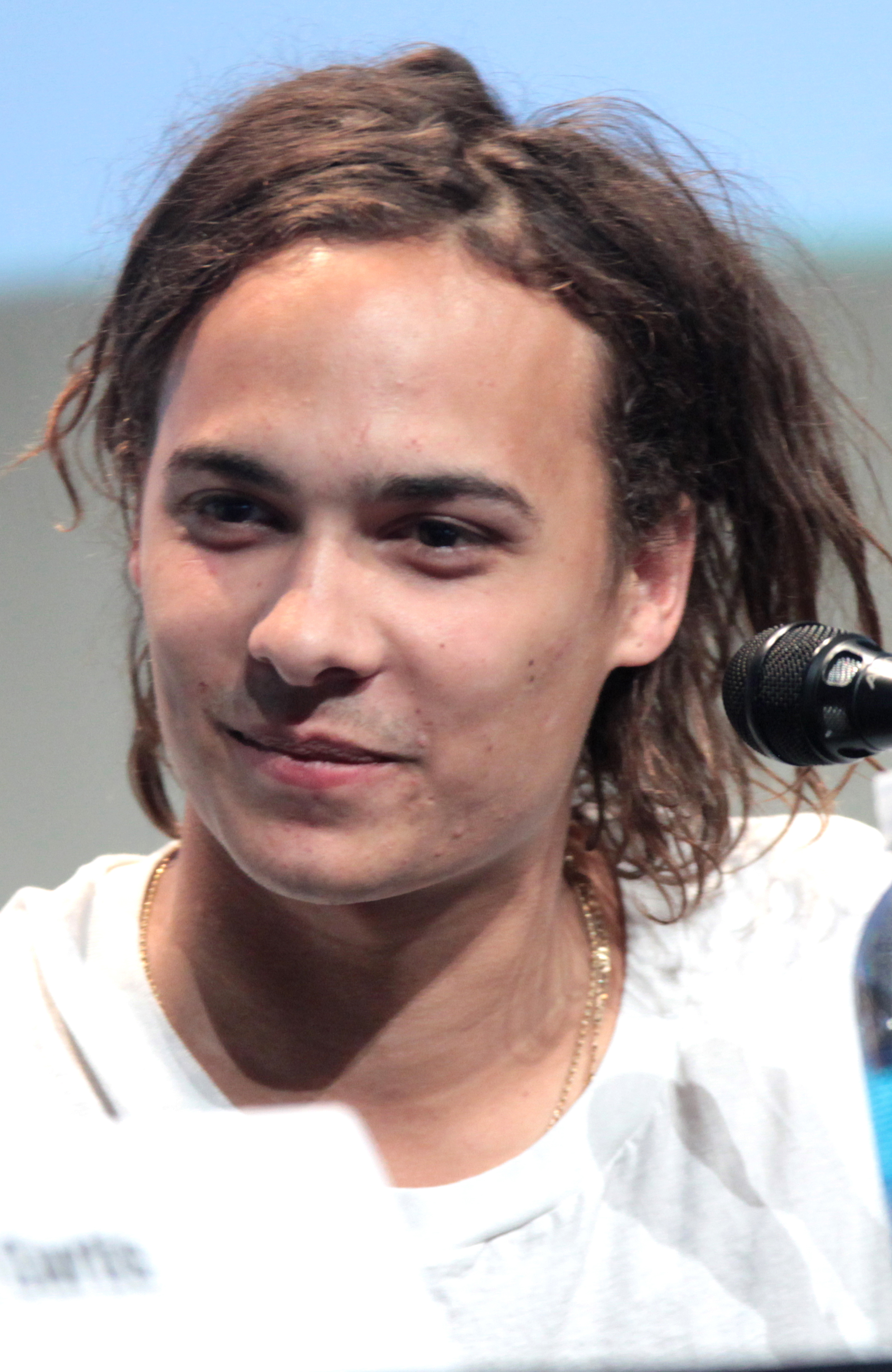
Kim Dickens (Madison Clark), Cliff Curtis (Travis Manawa) and Frank Dillane (Nick Clark)
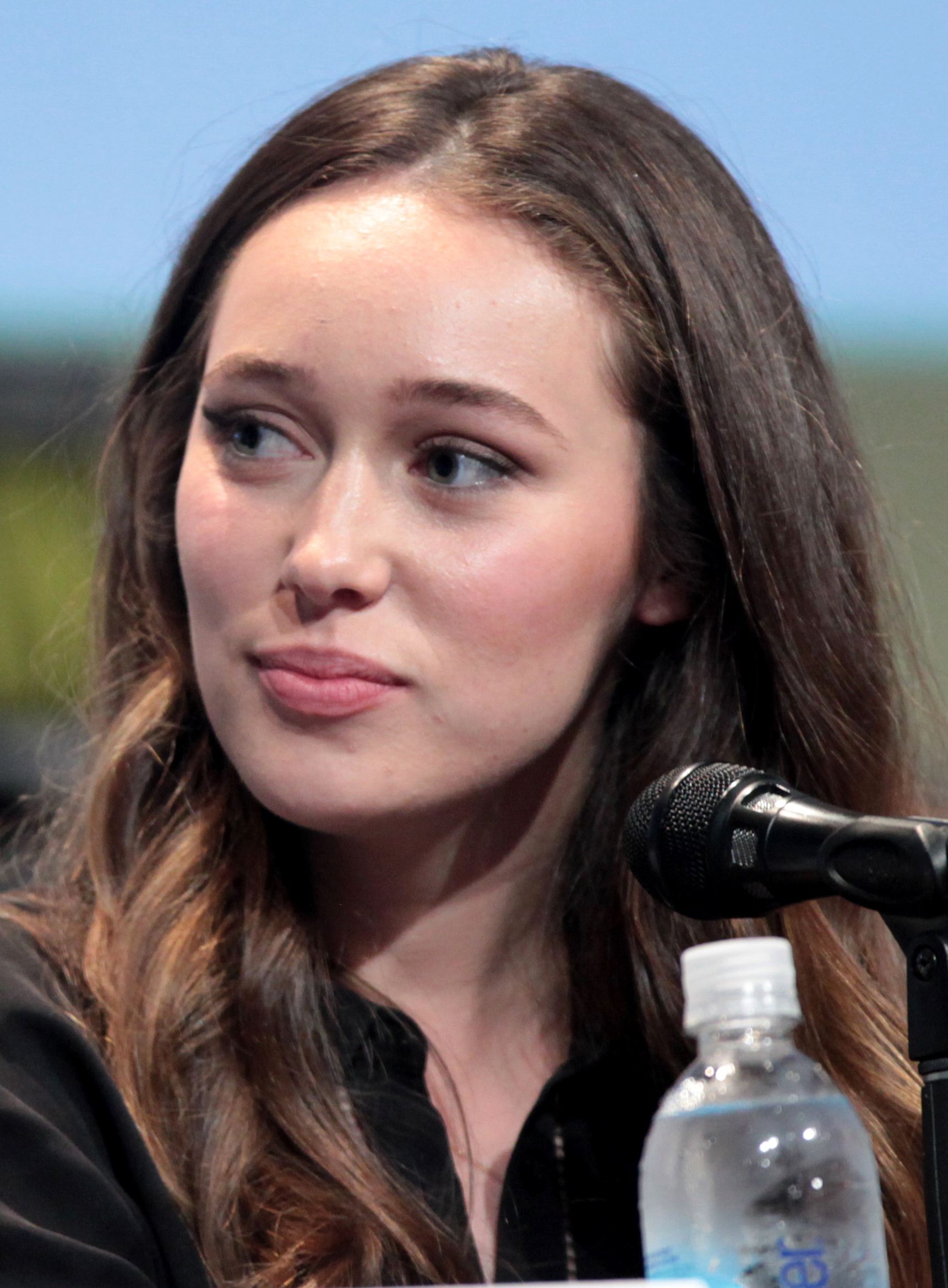
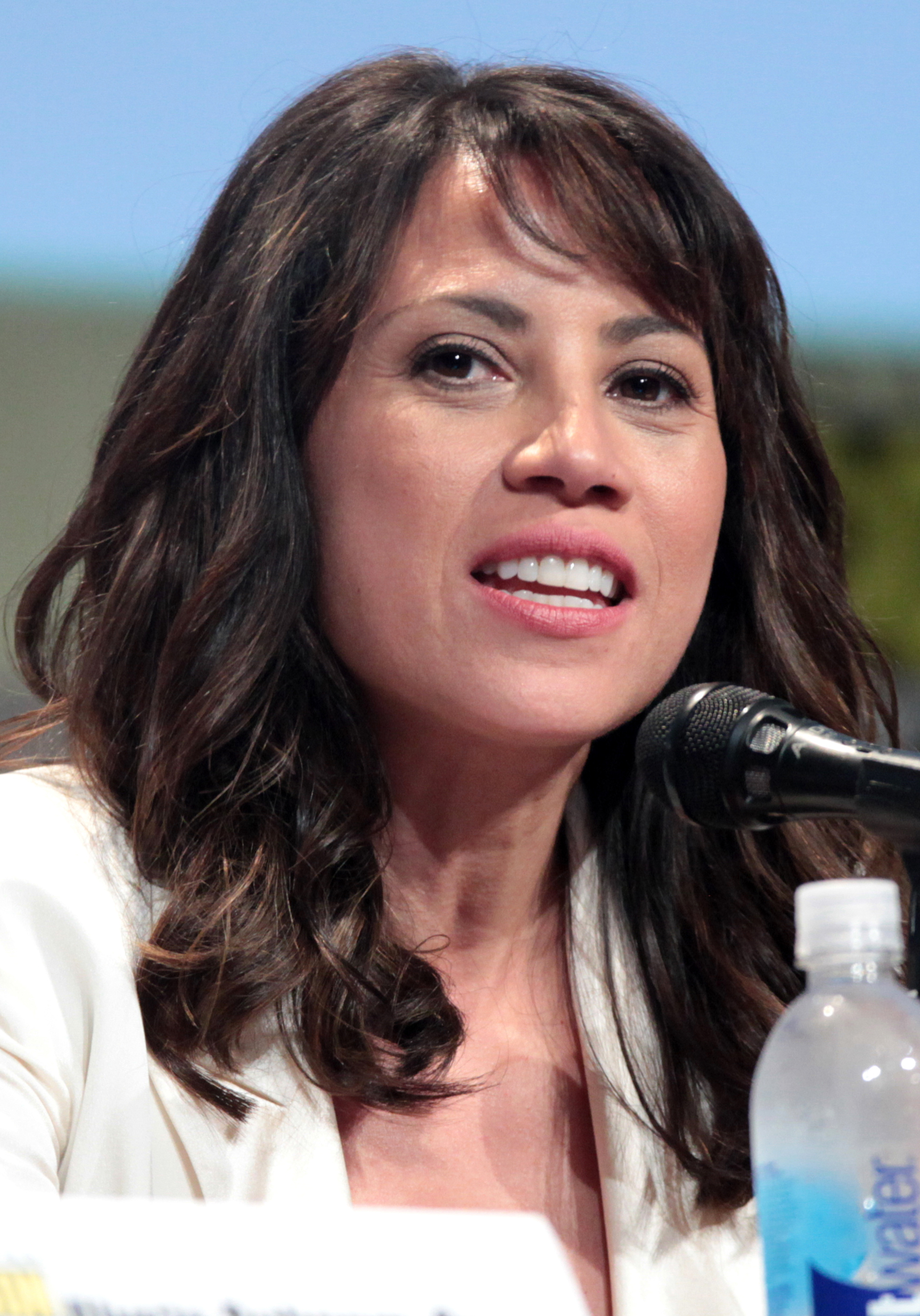
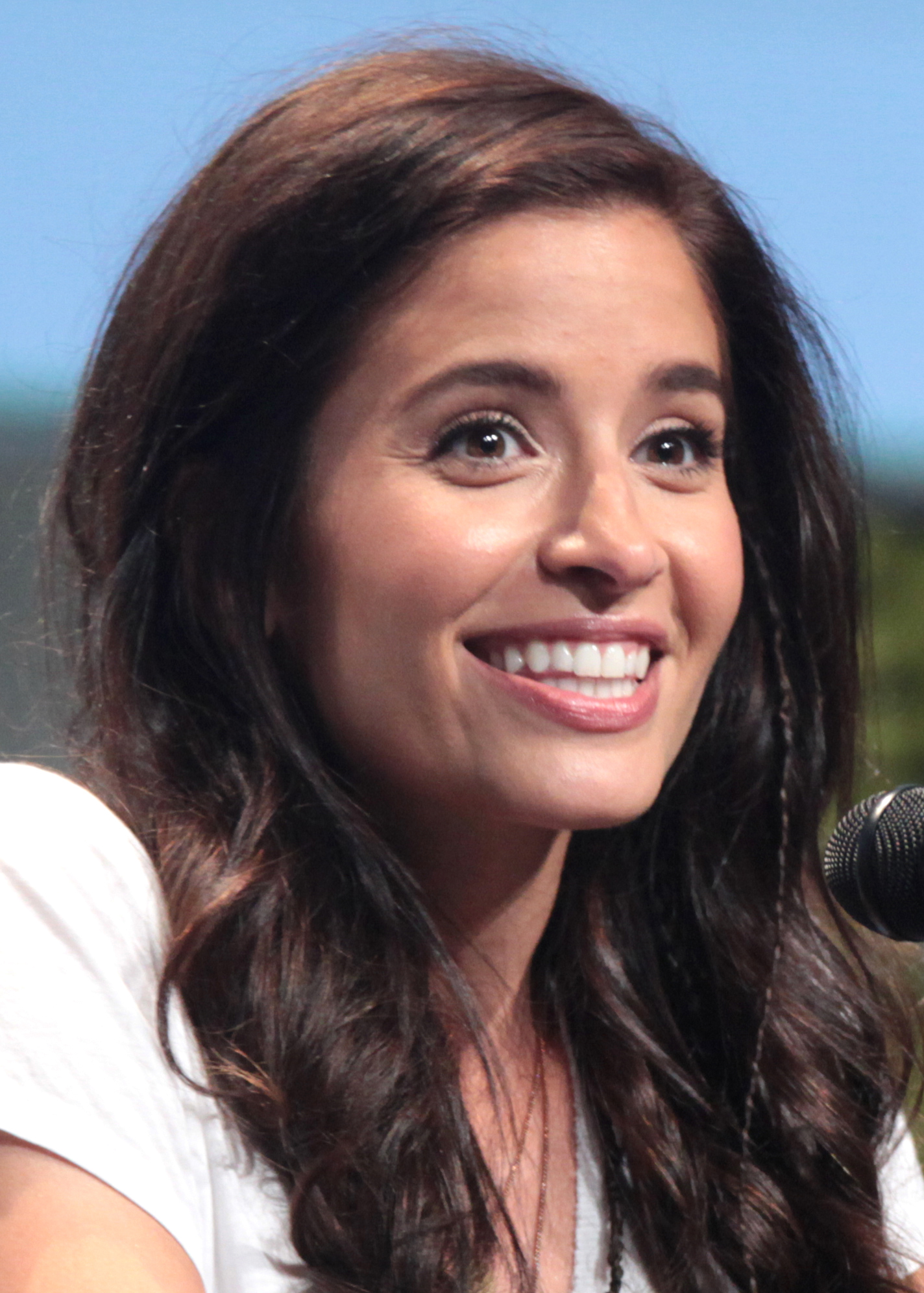
Alycia Debnam-Carey (Alicia Clark), Elizabeth Rodriguez (Liza Ortiz) and Mercedes Mason (Ofelia Salazar)
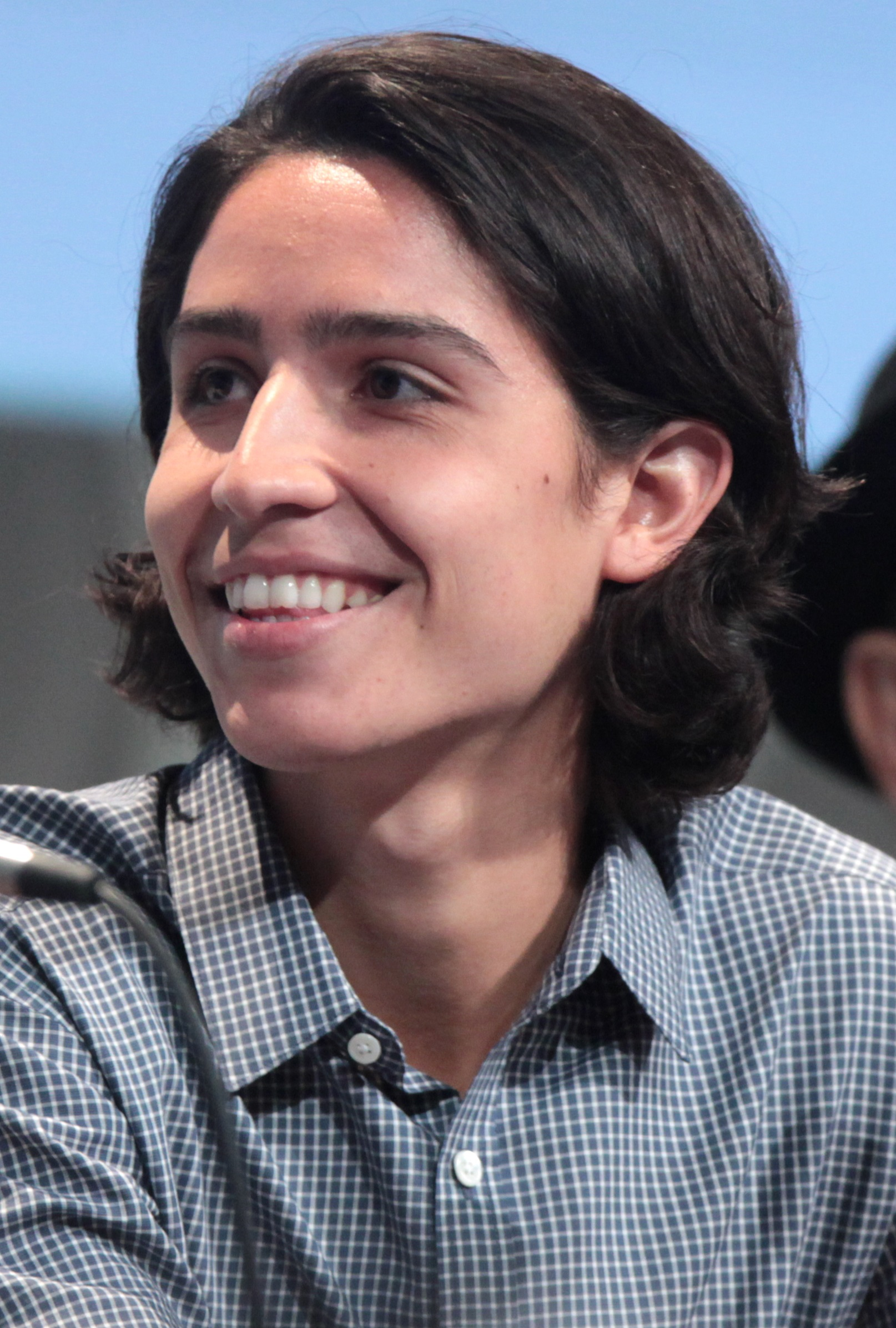
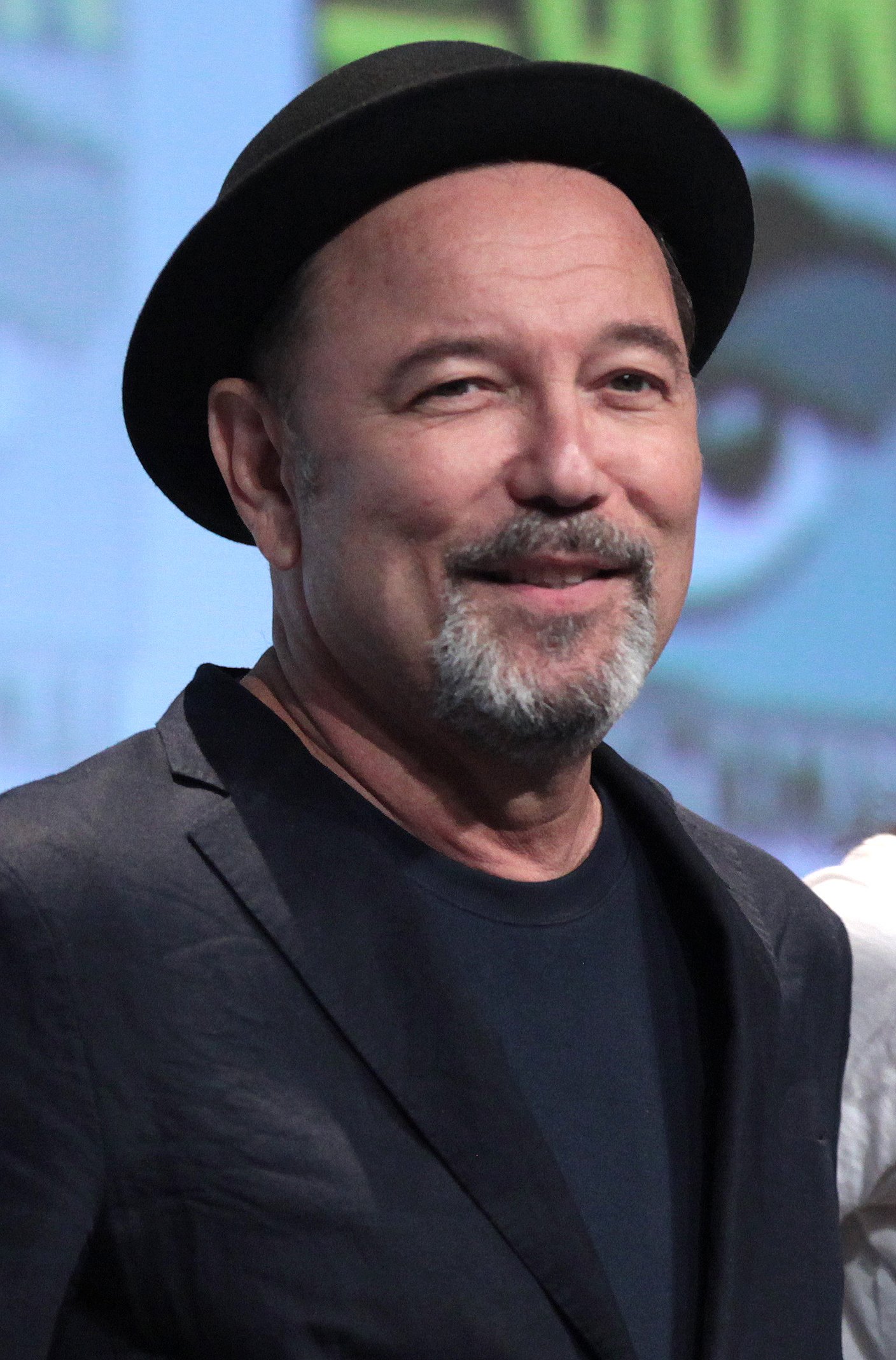
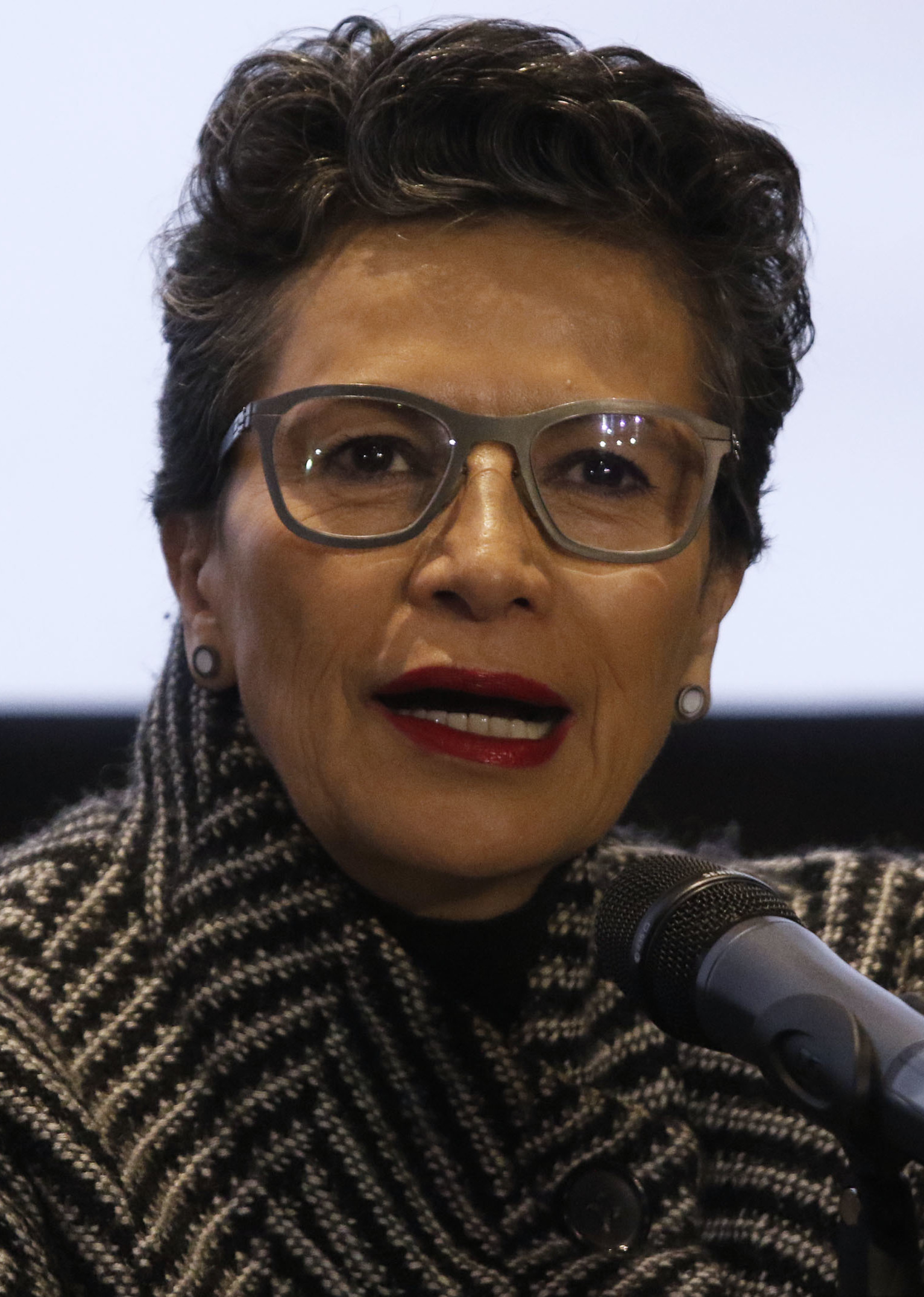
Lorenzo James Henrie (Chris Manawa), Rubén Blades (Daniel Salazar) and Patricia Reyes Spíndola (Griselda Salazar)

=== Main cast ===
The first season features eight actors receiving main cast billing status:

- Kim Dickens as Madison Clark: An intelligent and domineering high school guidance counselor, the mother of Nick and Alicia, and Travis's fiancée.
- Cliff Curtis as Travis Manawa: A resolute and peacekeeping high school teacher, Madison's fiancé, Chris's father, and Liza's ex-husband.
- Frank Dillane as Nick Clark: A brave and selfless recovering heroin addict, Madison's son, and Alicia's brother.
- Alycia Debnam-Carey as Alicia Clark: The fiery yet compassionate daughter of Madison, and the sister of Nick.
- Elizabeth Rodriguez as Liza Ortiz: A no-nonsense and caring nursing student, Travis's ex-wife, and Chris's mother.
- Mercedes Mason as Ofelia Salazar: The strong-willed and very capable daughter of Daniel and his wife Griselda.
- Lorenzo James Henrie as Chris Manawa: Travis and Liza's rebellious teenage son, who becomes more brutal due to the landscape of the deadly new world.
- Rubén Blades as Daniel Salazar: A courageous and practical former Sombra Negra member, a barber, Griselda's husband, and Ofelia's father.

=== Supporting cast ===
- Patricia Reyes Spíndola as Griselda Salazar: Ofelia's mother, who emigrated from El Salvador with her husband Daniel to escape political unrest.
- Shawn Hatosy as Cpl. Andrew Adams: A well-intentioned military man with a soulful disposition, who is out of his element.
- Sandrine Holt as Dr. Bethany Exner: A confident and skilled doctor.

=== Guest cast ===
- Maestro Harrell as Matt Sale: Alicia's boyfriend.
- Scott Lawrence as Art "Artie" Costa: The principal at the high school where Madison and Travis work.
- Keith Powers as Calvin: Nick's best friend and drug dealer.
- Lincoln A. Castellanos as Tobias: A wise-beyond-his-years high school senior.
- Leon Thomas III as Russell: One of Travis's students before the outbreak.
- Jamie McShane as Lt. Moyers: The leader of the National Guard contingent in charge of protecting Madison's neighborhood. He does not take the complaints of the citizens too seriously and is a loose cannon.
- Colman Domingo as Victor Strand: A smart and sophisticated businessman with a mysterious past.

== Episodes ==
| No. overall | No. in season | Title | Directed by | Written by | Original release date | U.S. viewers (millions) |
|---|---|---|---|---|---|---|
| 1 | 1 | "Pilot" | Adam Davidson | Robert Kirkman & Dave Erickson | August 23, 2015 | 10.13 |
Nick Clark awakens in a squat den in an abandoned dilapidated church, to find his girlfriend Gloria with a knife stuck in her abdomen and eating a corpse. While fleeing, he is hit by a car and hospitalized. The doctor tells Nick's mother Madison and stepfather Travis Manawa that Nick's claims about the incident are heroin induced hallucinations, but Travis believes Nick after visiting the church himself. Nick's sister Alicia becomes more worried about Nick's chemical dependency and state of mind and wants him to return to rehab. The next day, school closes early due to the high levels of absenteeism, rumors of an epidemic and rising chaos. Nick escapes from the hospital and meets with Calvin, hoping to learn if the drugs Calvin sold him were laced and caused him to hallucinate. Calvin tries to kill Nick to prevent him from exposing Calvin as a drug dealer or impugning the quality of his drugs. In the ensuing struggle, Calvin is mortally shot. After Travis and Madison pick Nick up, the zombified Calvin attacks them. Nick runs over Calvin repeatedly with Travis's truck, and the three watch in disbelief as the mutilated Calvin is still able to turn his head towards them.
| 2 | 2 | "So Close, Yet So Far" | Adam Davidson | Marco Ramirez | August 30, 2015 | 8.18 |
After the run-in with zombified Calvin, Nick, Madison, and Travis choose to flee to the desert, and they want Alicia, Liza, and Chris to follow. Alicia finds Matt ill in his disheveled house. Travis arrives and sees a bite on Matt, who convinces Alicia to leave and not risk contagion. The group returns to Madison's home to gather supplies. Nick suffers from opiate withdrawal, so Madison drives to her school to get him some confiscated Oxycodone to ease his symptoms so they can travel. There, she encounters Tobias scavenging food. A zombified Artie tries to bite Tobias, so Madison kills Artie and drives Tobias home. Chris's bus is trapped in a traffic jam caused by a zombie shooting by the police. He films the event and joins in a protest against that and other recent fatal police shootings, when Travis and Liza meet up with him. A riot erupts after police shoot down another zombie, but the three Manawas find refuge with the Salazars in their gated barbershop-home. Travis tells Madison to take the kids to the desert without him; he will catch up. Alicia witnesses her zombified neighbor, Mr. Dawson, attacking Mrs. Cruz across the street, but Madison prevents her from intervening. The group inside the barbershop remains trapped, while the riot outside intensifies to chaos.
| 3 | 3 | "The Dog" | Adam Davidson | Jack LoGiudice | September 13, 2015 | 7.19 |
While a riot rages outside, a mob sets fire to the store adjoining the barbershop, forcing the Salazars and Manawas to flee. The group reaches Travis's truck and escapes, but not before Griselda is injured by a collapsing scaffold. Unable to reach a hospital, the group drives to Madison's house, where Nick, Madison, and Alicia temporarily flee when the zombified Mr. Dawson attempts to enter, attracted by the barking dog Nick had let in. Nick leads Madison and Alicia to the Trans' house next door, where they take a shotgun. Travis arrives and is attacked by Mr. Dawson, who is shot and killed by Daniel. All three families decide to stay the night and evacuate in the morning. Nurse Liza tends to Griselda's injured foot but notes that Griselda will lose the foot if not treated by a doctor. Ofelia tells Daniel they should flee with Travis, but Daniel insists his family can survive alone and will join his cousin later. The next morning, as the Clarks and Manawas start driving away, the National Guard arrives and quarantines the block. While Travis says, "It's going to get better," Daniel laments that it’s, "too late," as he watches a guardsman mark the neighboring house.
| 4 | 4 | "Not Fade Away" | Kari Skogland | Meaghan Oppenheimer | September 20, 2015 | 6.62 |
Days after the National Guard quarantines the neighborhood into a Safe Zone, residents try to live normally. Tensions build under the military rule. Madison is stressed by extra work caused by her home's being overcrowded and Travis's new role as civilian liaison. Chris shows a video to Travis and Madison of a light signaling from the Dead Zone. Travis talks Doug into getting mental help. Liza medically helps neighbors. Nick steals morphine from a severely ill Hector via IV drip then lies to his mother about not needing his weaning-off tablets. Ofelia kisses Adams, who was unable to get Griselda's medicine. Madison exchanges signals with the flashing light in the Dead Zone. She sneaks outside the fence to investigate and finds evidence that the guardsmen killed civilians, even the uninfected. Travis learns that Doug has been hospitalized for his anxiety issues. Dr. Exner determines that Liza is not technically a nurse but asks her to keep pretending under the circumstances. Daniel warns Madison of his El Salvador experience, when the sick were taken under the guise of receiving hospitalization but instead killed. Soldiers take Griselda and Nick to a hospital, but Nick's family protests his departure. Liza agrees to go to assist the medical team, despite not wanting to leave her son. Travis retreats to the roof and sees the signal from the Dead Zone. Seconds later, he sees and hears gunfire, followed by darkness.
| 5 | 5 | "Cobalt" | Kari Skogland | David Wiener | September 27, 2015 | 6.66 |
In a military cell, Strand bribes a guardsman to save feverish Nick from being moved. Liza helps Dr. Exner with patients at the hospital. Chris is devastated that Liza left voluntarily to help at the hospital, but Travis promises to bring her back. Madison discovers Daniel detaining Adams in the Trans' basement. Alicia and Chris get drunk within, play luxury dress-up, then vandalize the abandoned home of a wealthy family. Strand recruits Nick for an escape plot. Travis convinces Moyers's squad to take him to the hospital to check on his friends. While en route, Moyers encourages Travis to shoot a zombie, but Travis is emotionally unable to pull the trigger. The soldiers stop to assist another squad in a building infested by zombies, and most of those soldiers, including Moyers, are overcome. The few survivors flee and drop off Travis near the Safe Zone. Travis learns that Daniel tortured Adams into revealing what "Cobalt" means: in the morning, all civilians will be killed, and the guardsmen will evacuate the city. Griselda dies of septic shock at the hospital; Liza shoots her brain to prevent reanimation. Daniel visits a nearby sports arena to verify Adams's story that it was sealed with 2,000 now-zombified civilians inside.
| 6 | 6 | "The Good Man" | Stefan Schwartz | Robert Kirkman & Dave Erickson | October 4, 2015 | 6.86 |
The group drives to the National Guard's headquarters to rescue Liza, Griselda, and Nick. Adams agrees to be their guide when let go by Travis. The group infiltrates the base after Daniel distracts the guards by leading a horde of walkers from the arena. Travis, Madison, Daniel, and Ofelia go inside, while Alicia and Chris stay behind. Meanwhile, the walkers breach the perimeter defenses and swarm the base. Travis's group reaches the holding cells and set the detainees free before reuniting with Nick, Liza, and Strand. They try to escape through the medical ward, where they discover Dr. Exner has euthanized all of the patients since evac abandoned them. Dr. Exner tells them of an escape route, though believes it's useless trying, before presumably committing suicide. Before they can escape, the group encounters a vengeful Adams, who shoots Ofelia in the arm. Enraged, Travis brutally beats Adams and leaves him for dead. Strand leads the group to his oceanside mansion, where he reveals to Nick that he owns a yacht which he plans to escape on, called the Abigail. On the beach, Liza reveals to Madison that she had been bitten during the escape. Knowing there's no cure, Liza pleads with Madison and Travis to euthanize her before she turns. Travis promises to protect Chris before shooting Liza in the head.

== Reception ==
=== Critical response ===
On Rotten Tomatoes, the season has a rating of 76%, based on 206 reviews, whose average rating is 6.75/10. The site's critical consensus reads, "Fear the Walking Dead recycles elements of its predecessor, but it's still moody and engrossing enough to compete with the original." On Metacritic, the season has a score of 66 out of 100, based on 33 critics, indicating "generally favorable" reviews.

Elisabeth Vincentelli of the New York Post rated the first two episodes three out of four stars, stating that "[They] are creepily suspenseful–they're great examples of how effective a slow pace and a moody atmosphere can be." Another positive review of the first episode came from Ken Tucker of Yahoo TV, who wrote, "Fear the Walking Dead is a mood piece, more artful than the original series" and that the cast is "terrific". Tim Goodman of The Hollywood Reporter gave an average review, writing, "The 90-minute first episode and the hour-long second episode are, while not actually boring, certainly less magnetic than the original."

One of the harshest negative reviews came from HitFix, on Daniel Fienberg and Alan Sepinwall's podcast, where Fienberg called the premiere episode "awful, just horrible ... as bad as The Walking Dead has ever gotten at its very worst. This is that bad. I've been kind of stunned to see people being generous to it. ... I thought this was almost unwatchably bad." Sepinwall called his B− review "slightly generous".

Fear the Walking Dead season 1: Critical reception by episode
Season 1 (2015): Percentage of positive critics' reviews tracked by the website Rotten Tomatoes

=== Ratings ===
The U.S. series premiere attracted 10.1 million total viewers, with 6.3 million in the advertiser-coveted 18-to-49-year-old demographic, both cable television records for a series premiere. Numerous international debuts of the pilot also set ratings records. The first season averaged 11.2 million viewers in "live plus-3" ratings (includes VOD and DVR viewing within three days after initial telecast) to become the highest-rated first season of any series in cable history.

Viewership and ratings per episode of Fear the Walking Dead season 1
| No. | Title | Air date | Rating (18–49) | Viewers (millions) | DVR (18–49) | DVR viewers (millions) | Total (18–49) | Total viewers (millions) |
|---|---|---|---|---|---|---|---|---|
| 1 | "Pilot" | August 23, 2015 | 4.9 | 10.13 | 2.1 | 3.83 | 7.0 | 13.96 |
| 2 | "So Close, Yet So Far" | August 30, 2015 | 4.1 | 8.18 | 2.2 | 4.06 | 6.3 | 12.24 |
| 3 | "The Dog" | September 13, 2015 | 3.6 | 7.19 | 2.4 | 3.40 | 6.0 | 10.59 |
| 4 | "Not Fade Away" | September 20, 2015 | 3.3 | 6.62 | 2.0 | 3.75 | 5.3 | 10.37 |
| 5 | "Cobalt" | September 27, 2015 | 3.4 | 6.66 | 1.8 | 3.37 | 5.3 | 10.03 |
| 6 | "The Good Man" | October 4, 2015 | 3.4 | 6.86 | —N/a | —N/a | —N/a | —N/a |

== Home media ==
The first season was released on Blu-ray and DVD on December 1, 2015. A special edition version of the first season was released on Blu-ray and DVD on March 22, 2016, with new bonus features, including deleted scenes, seven featurettes, and audio commentaries by cast and crew, on all six episodes.
