= The Dog (Fear the Walking Dead) =

- Fear the Walking Dead episode
- Episode no.: Season 1 Episode 3
- Directed by: Adam Davidson
- Written by: Jack LoGiudice
- Original air date: September 13, 2015
- Running time: 48 minutes

Guest appearance
- Patricia Reyes Spindola as Griselda Salazar

Episode chronology
← Previous "So Close, Yet So Far"	Next → "Not Fade Away"
- Fear the Walking Dead (season 1)

"The Dog" is the third episode of the first season of the post-apocalyptic horror television series Fear the Walking Dead, which aired on AMC on September 13, 2015 in the United States.

== Plot ==
At the barbershop, the Salazars and Manawas watch the riot raging outside. Though Travis wants to wait until the riot dies down before leaving, they are forced to evacuate when looters set fire to the store adjoining the barbershop. While scrambling to reach Travis' truck, Griselda's leg is severely injured by a collapsing scaffold. The group is able to carry her to the truck and escape, and rush to get her to a hospital. They discover that the nearest hospital has been completely locked down, and assume all the other hospitals are in the same state; the group decides to drive to Madison's house to treat Griselda's injury themselves. At the house, Nick, Madison, and Alicia play board games while awaiting Travis' arrival, when a dog unexpectedly arrives at their back door. Nick lets the dog in, and they discover it covered in blood despite not showing any apparent injuries. The dog suddenly begins barking out the window at the reanimated corpse of a neighbor, Peter Dawson, who is attracted to the noise and attempts to break in. The three of them flee through the back door and watch as Peter kills and begins eating the dog. Nick leads Madison and Alicia to the Trans' house next door, where they are able to break in and retrieve a shotgun. Travis and the others arrive at Madison's home and discover Peter, who tries to attack him, but Madison and Nick arrive with the shotgun; when they hesitate to shoot, Daniel grabs the gun and puts down Peter himself. Alicia goes back to the Trans' house to retrieve more ammunition for the shotgun, but runs into the reanimated corpse of their neighbor, Susan, which tries to attack her. With Chris's help, she is able to escape over the fence back into the Clarks' yard, and Nick finally explains the full situation to her, as she was previously unaware of the reanimating corpses.

Shaken by the recent events, all three families decide to stay the night. Daniel tells the others that his cousin will pick up his family in the morning, while Travis plans to lead both the Clarks and the Manawas to the desert. Liza tends to Griselda's injured foot but notes that Griselda will die if not treated by a doctor; Madison offers her some of the Oxycodone that she got for Nick to alleviate the pain. Madison decides to put Susan down using a hammer, but is stopped by Travis, who convinces her that there is still a chance that Susan could be saved. Later that night, Ofelia tells Daniel that she thinks they should go with the other families to the desert, but Daniel insists his family can survive alone; he believes the other families lack the strength to survive, after having witnessed Travis and Madison refuse to put down both Peter and Susan. He also admits to her that he lied about his cousin picking them up, upsetting her even further due to Griselda's worsening condition. The next morning, the Clarks and Manawas depart, but are quickly halted by the arrival of the National Guard, who quarantine the neighborhood. Several citizens are taken away by the Guardsmen, including Susan's husband, Patrick. Travis assumes that the soldiers will be able to contain the outbreak and that life will return to normal, but Daniel laments that it’s too late for that.

== Reception ==
"The Dog" received positive reviews from critics. On Rotten Tomatoes, it garnered a 67% rating with an average score of 6.26/10 based on 24 reviews. The site consensus reads: "While the apocalyptic horror of Fear the Walking Dead works well in 'The Dog,' the attempt at character development has mixed results."

Matt Fowler of IGN gave "The Dog" a 7.8/10.0 rating, the highest of the series at that point, stating; ""The Dog" brought everyone back together so they could hash things out, brew up a little conflict, and form a new plan of escape. The military intervention right at the end felt like a huge tonal shift, so we'll have to see how it plays out in the coming episodes. Despite the sprawling cityscape, this has been a somewhat intimate show and now it's being opened up wide."

=== Ratings ===
"The Dog" was seen by 7.19 million viewers in the United States on its original air date, nearly a million less than the previous episode.
