= The Good Man (Fear the Walking Dead) =

- Fear the Walking Dead episode
- Episode no.: Season 1 Episode 6
- Directed by: Stefan Schwartz
- Written by: Robert Kirkman; Dave Erickson
- Original air date: October 4, 2015
- Running time: 51 minutes

Guest appearances
- Colman Domingo as Victor Strand; Shawn Hatosy as Andrew Adams; Sandrine Holt as Bethany Exner

Episode chronology
← Previous "Cobalt"	Next → "Monster"
- Fear the Walking Dead (season 1)

"The Good Man" is the sixth and final episode of the first season of the post-apocalyptic horror television series Fear the Walking Dead, which aired on AMC on October 4, 2015 in the United States.

== Plot ==
After Daniel confirmed Adams' claims about the massive sports arena filled with the undead, the group packs up their belongings and leaves the neighborhood, planning to drive to the nearby National Guard compound to rescue Liza, Griselda, and Nick. Before leaving, Daniel and Travis debate over whether or not they should let Adams free, with Daniel believing that he would serve as a threat and should instead be executed. Travis convinces the others to let Adams live, but shortly before leaving, Adams convinces Travis to let him go free, after giving him instructions on where to find everyone in the compound. Upon arriving at the compound, Daniel distracts the guards by releasing the horde of walkers from the arena and leading them to the front gates, causing a panic amongst the guards and allowing the rest of the group to enter the compound. Travis, Madison, Daniel, and Ofelia go inside, while Alicia and Chris wait by the exit in the vehicles. Shortly after the others leave, however, several National Guards troops arrive and threaten Chris and Alicia into giving them the keys to one of their vehicles; Chris and Alicia are unharmed but the troops steal the group's SUV.

Outside, the undead breach the perimeter defenses and swarm the building. As the Guardsmen evacuate the compound, Strand and Nick escape from their holding cells using a key that Strand stole from one of the guards. Other detainees beg to be released, and Nick tries to convince Strand to help them, but he refuses, and the two of them attempt to escape the building. Strand tells Nick that they will be heading west to a house he owns by the ocean, where they will meet with someone he calls "Abigail". Shortly afterwards, Travis' group reaches the holding cells, but find that Nick is nowhere to be found; they release the other detainees, who point them in the direction that Nick went. Following those directions, Travis' group reunites with Nick and meets Strand; they also reunite with Liza, who had been trying to find an exit as well. The group tries to escape through the medical ward, where they discover that Dr. Exner has euthanized all of the patients after the evacuation teams left them behind. She tells them of an escape route into the building's sublevels, and though they offer to bring her with them, she opts to stay behind, presumably committing suicide. The group follows her directions and reaches the area where the vehicles were parked, but before they can escape, a vengeful Adams approaches, threatening the group with a handgun and shooting Ofelia in the arm. Enraged, Travis brutally beats Adams and leaves him for dead.

The group gets into their vehicles and drives away. Strand directs the group to his oceanside mansion, where he reveals to Nick that "Abigail" is actually his yacht, which he plans to use to flee the area. Meanwhile, on the beach, Liza reveals to Madison that she had been bitten during the escape, and pleads with Madison to euthanize her using a handgun. Before Madison is able to do it, Travis arrives, and Liza tearfully explains to him that she was bitten and that the infection cannot be treated. She asks Travis to put her down, and Madison hands him the pistol; Travis promises that he will keep Chris safe, before tearfully shooting Liza.

== Reception ==
"The Good Man" received positive reviews from critics. On Rotten Tomatoes, it garnered a 75% rating with an average score of 7.33/10 based on 24 reviews. The site consensus reads: "After five episodes of slow set-up, Fear the Walking Dead concludes its short first season with 'The Good Man,' an action-packed and emotionally intense finale."

Matt Fowler of IGN gave the finale a 7.7/10 rating stating: "'The Good Man' finally took Travis to some dark places of action and consequence, though it may have been 'too little, too late' considering how some fans already desperately want him gone after such a small number of episodes. And while the show lost one of the 'good ones' in Liza, I am surprised at how little tragedy, overall, this group suffered during the collapse of LA. The army storyline shielded them from so much that it kind of put a damper on the drama. Still, this one had a lot of zombies and a lot of death and sometimes that works to zap a pulse back into a flailing series."

=== Ratings ===
"The Good Man" was seen by 6.86 million viewers in the United States on its original air date, above the previous episodes rating of 6.66 by a .20 margin. "The Good Man" was the second consecutive episode of Fear the Walking Dead to have a higher viewership than its previous episode.
