= So Close, Yet So Far (Fear the Walking Dead) =

- Fear the Walking Dead episode
- Episode no.: Season 1 Episode 2
- Directed by: Adam Davidson
- Written by: Marco Ramirez
- Original air date: August 30, 2015
- Running time: 43 minutes

Guest appearances
- Patricia Reyes Spindola as Griselda Salazar; Maestro Harrell as Matt Sale; Scott Lawrence as Art Costa; Lincoln A. Castellanos as Tobias

Episode chronology
← Previous "Pilot"	Next → "The Dog"
- Fear the Walking Dead (season 1)

"So Close, Yet So Far" is the second episode of the first season of the post-apocalyptic horror television series Fear the Walking Dead, which aired on AMC on August 30, 2015 in the United States.

== Plot ==
After the run-in with the reanimated Calvin, Nick, Madison, and Travis decide that the best action would be to flee to the desert. They return to pick up Alicia, who has gone to Matt's house, where he is lying ill with a high fever; she initially refuses to leave Matt's side, but reluctantly agrees when he insists that it would be for her own safety. Before leaving, Travis notices a bite wound on Matt's shoulder, which Madison theorizes may be one way of how the illness spreads. The four of them returns to Madison's home to gather supplies. Travis leaves to pick up Liza and Chris, and Madison leaves to try and find medication when Nick begins to suffer from heroin withdrawal. She drives to the school where she is able to get some Oxycodone. While there, she encounters a student, Tobias, scavenging food from the cafeteria. As the two of them prepare to leave, they discover the reanimated corpse of the principal, Artie, who tries to attack Tobias; after a brief struggle, Madison is able to put down Artie, and she drives Tobias home. Back at the house, Alicia attempts to leave to visit Matt but is stopped when Nick begins to have a seizure; she is able to help him recover and saves him from nearly choking on his own vomit. Madison arrives home shortly after, and tries to call Travis, but receives no response.

Meanwhile, while taking the bus home, Chris gets trapped in a traffic jam caused by a reanimated corpse being shot by the police. He and the other passengers exit the bus and join a growing crowd of protestors, who believe that the police shot a homeless man. Chris begins filming the event, as the crowd grows larger and more violent. Travis arrives at Liza's house and the two call Chris, who tells them where he is; they drive to the protest and attempt to bring him home, but a riot erupts after police shoot down another reanimated corpse. The three of them flee and are able to seek refuge in a barbershop owned by a man named Daniel Salazar, who has been sheltering inside with his wife Griselda and their daughter Ofelia. Travis calls Madison and explains their situation; she tells him that she was able to get the Oxycodone and plans to use it to slowly wean Nick off of his dependency. Travis tells her to take Nick and Alicia to the desert without him, and that he will catch up later on; she refuses, insisting that they will continue waiting for him. After they lose connection, Alicia witnesses her reanimated neighbor, Mr. Dawson, attack another neighbor, Mrs. Cruz, across the street; she tries to go intervene but Madison stops her. Back inside the barbershop, the Manawas and the Salazars remain trapped, and watch as the riot outside intensifies.

== Reception ==
"So Close, Yet So Far" received mostly positive reviews. On Rotten Tomatoes, it garnered an 86% rating with an average score of 6.63/10 based on 21 reviews. The site consensus reads: "'So Close, Yet So Far' maintains the slow-burn build of the FTWD pilot, earning its moments of gripping tension with zombie attacks and dynamic dysfunctional family drama."

Matt Fowler of IGN gave "So Close, Yet So Far" a 7.5/10 rating stating: "By the end of 'So Close, Yet So Far,' Alicia and Chris seemed to get what was happening. But now they all pretty much missed their window to flee. Stil, this episode was good at showing us how quickly society can collapse, the toughness of fresh 'day one' walkers, and all the ways a zombie outbreak can be misinterpreted. 1988's Miracle Mile (for those who've seen it) springs to mind. It's about a diner full of people who learn about an incoming nuclear strike on LA before the rest of the city does and then scramble to get out before it's too late."

=== Ratings ===
"So Close, Yet So Far" was seen by 8.18 million viewers in the United States on its original air date, nearly 2 million less than the pilot episode.
