= So Close, Yet So Far =

So Close, Yet So Far may refer to:

- "So Close, Yet So Far (From Paradise)", a song by Elvis Presley on his 1965 album Harum Scarum
- "So Close" (Hall & Oates song), a song from the 1990 Hall & Oates album Change of Season
- So Close...Yet So Far, a 1998 album by The Prayer Chain
- "So Close and Yet So Far", a song by Chunk! No, Captain Chunk! from the 2013 album Pardon My French
- "So Far Yet So Close", a song from the 2016 season of the RV series Alex & Co.
- "So Far Yet So Close", a song by Yesung from the 2017 album Spring Falling
- "So Close, Yet So Far" (Fear the Walking Dead), a 2015 episode of the American television series Fear the Walking Dead
