= Pilot (Fear the Walking Dead) =

- Fear the Walking Dead episode
- Episode no.: Season 1 Episode 1
- Directed by: Adam Davidson
- Written by: Dave Erickson; Robert Kirkman
- Original air date: August 23, 2015
- Running time: 67 minutes

Guest appearances
- Maestro Harrell as Matt Sale; Scott Lawrence as Art Costa; Keith Powers as Calvin; Lincoln A. Castellanos as Tobias; Lynn Chen as Nurse; Leon Thomas as Russell

Episode chronology
| ← Previous — | Next → "So Close, Yet So Far" |
- Fear the Walking Dead (season 1)

"Pilot" is the pilot episode and series premiere of the post-apocalyptic horror television series Fear the Walking Dead, which aired on AMC on August 23, 2015, in the United States. The series is a companion series and prequel to The Walking Dead, which is based on the comic book series of the same name by Robert Kirkman, Tony Moore, and Charlie Adlard.

== Plot ==
Los Angeles resident Nick Clark wakes up one morning in a heroin den in an abandoned church to find the floor covered in blood and several mangled corpses throughout the building. Terrified, he tries to find his girlfriend Gloria but discovers her eating a corpse. He flees the church, but after running into the street, he is hit by a car and hospitalized. At the hospital, the doctor tells his mother, Madison Clark and stepfather Travis Manawa about what Nick claims to have seen, but assures them that it was likely nothing more than a drug-induced hallucination. Madison accepts this, but Travis remains skeptical, and decides to visit the church himself, finding the rooms covered in blood and viscera but with no sign of any corpses or Gloria. He tells this to Madison, but she dismisses it and tells him not to enable Nick. At her job as a high school guidance counselor, Madison grows concerned by the increasing number of students who are absent for illness, and she confiscates a pocket knife from one student who claims to be carrying it to defend himself against some unknown threats. Travis, who teaches at the same high school, struggles to balance his job with both caring for Nick and also trying to maintain his relationship with his ex-wife Liza Ortiz and their joint-custody son Chris. Meanwhile, Nick's sister Alicia becomes more worried about Nick's drug dependency, while also dealing with her boyfriend, Matt, seemingly ignoring her texts and not showing up to a date that they had planned.

The next day, the school closes early due to the high levels of absenteeism and rumors of an epidemic. Video footage begins circulating of first responders at a traffic accident being attacked by a reanimated corpse, which endures dozens of gunshots and injuries without stopping. Upon seeing this footage, Travis and Madison realize that everything Nick saw at the church was real. Before they can get to him, however, Nick manages to escape from the hospital and meets with his friend and dealer Calvin. Nick hopes to learn if the drugs that Calvin sold him were laced with anything that might have caused hallucinations in the church, which Calvin denies. Calvin then tells Nick that Madison and Travis had approached him earlier asking if he knew Nick's whereabouts. He accuses Nick of telling them about his drug dealing; Nick denies this, and Calvin seems to believe him. He offers to help Nick by buying him food and bringing him to an isolated river to offer him more heroin. Upon arriving at the river, however, Nick notices Calvin retrieve a gun from the trunk and realizes that Calvin plans to kill him to prevent him from exposing his drug dealership. Nick is able to defend himself, and in the ensuing struggle, Calvin is mortally shot. Nick flees the area and calls Travis to come pick him up. He arrives with Madison, and Nick explains the ordeal to them, but when they return to the river, Calvin's body is nowhere to be found. Believing Nick to be hallucinating again, the two of them return to their vehicle until a reanimated Calvin attacks them. Nick runs over Calvin repeatedly with Travis' truck, and the three watch in disbelief as the mutilated Calvin is still able to turn his head towards them.

== Production ==
=== Development ===
In September 2013, AMC announced they were developing a companion series to The Walking Dead, which follows a different set of characters created by Robert Kirkman. In September 2014, AMC ordered a pilot, which was written by Kirkman and Dave Erickson, and directed by Adam Davidson, and is executive produced by Kirkman, Erickson, Gale Anne Hurd, and David Alpert, with Erickson serving as showrunner. The project was originally known as Cobalt.

== Reception ==
The pilot episode of Fear the Walking Dead received very positive reviews. On Rotten Tomatoes, it garnered a 91% rating with an average score of 7.53/10 based on 23 reviews. The site consensus reads: "The pilot episode of Fear the Walking Dead does a solid job of establishing its characters and milieu, and provides enough tense moments to please diehard Dead heads."

Matt Fowler of IGN gave "Pilot" a 7.6/10.0 rating, stating, "Fear the Walking Dead brings a welcome shift in location, tone, and characters. Like Telltale's The Walking Dead video games, it's able to present us with a whole new cast of characters while demonstrating that it's really the zombified world that that's the star of the show and all that you really need for there to be a spinoff."

=== Ratings ===
The episode became the highest-rated series premiere for a scripted series in U.S. cable history, with 10.13 million viewers.

"Pilot" is the highest-rated episode of Fear the Walking Dead, with 10.13 million viewers in the United States on its original air date.
