= Lincoln A. Castellanos =

American actor

- Born: 1988 (age 37–38); Mexico
- Occupation: Actor

Lincoln A. Castellanos (born August 20, 1988) is an American actor, perhaps best known for his work on such television series and films as Fear the Walking Dead as Tobias, The Mentalist, and "I Am Gangster".

== Filmography ==
- Techno Bubble (2010) (Rick Jimenez, as Lincoln Castellanos)
- The Mentalist (2012) (Jeremiah) (Something's Rotten in Redmund)
- Fear the Walking Dead (2015) (Tobias) ("Pilot", "So Close, Yet So Far")
- Fresh Off the Boat (2015) (Kevin) (The Big 1–2)
- Code Black (2015) (Kurt) (The Son Rises)
- Roadies (2016) (Lincoln) (What Would Phil Do?, Friends and Family)
- Mayans M.C. (2021) (Mechanic) (Chapter the Last, Nothing More to Write)
- Far Cry 6 (2021)
