= Jack LoGiudice =

American television writer and producer

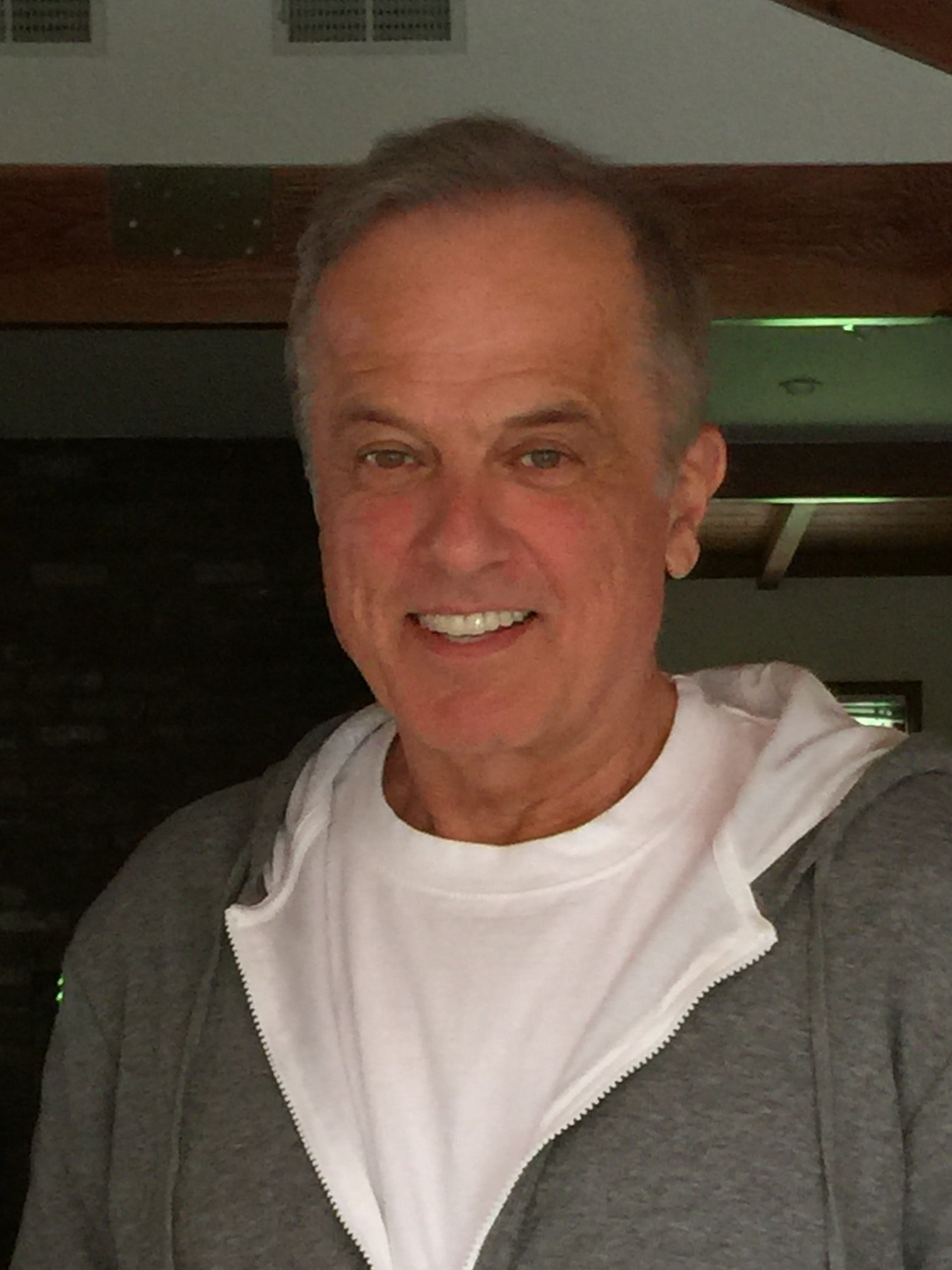
- Born: Youngstown, Ohio, United States
- Education: Bowling Green State University
- Occupations: Television writer, producer
- Years active: 1987–present

Jack LoGiudice is an American television writer and producer, best known for his work on the FX series Sons of Anarchy and most recently worked as a co-executive producer and writer on AMC's The Walking Dead.

== Biography ==
LoGiudice began his career working on The Dom DeLuise Show in 1987 before becoming a writer on shows like Dear John, 7th Heaven and Dellaventura through the 1990s. From 2000 onwards he has worked as a producer and writer for series such as Resurrection Blvd., Street Time, Sons of Anarchy and most recently completed work on The Walking Dead. In 2008 he co-wrote a television movie called Crash and Burn, which starred Erik Palladino and Michael Madsen. It was directed by Russell Mulcahy.

== Filmography ==
=== Producer ===
Year	Show	Role	Notes
2023	Renfield	Co-executive producer	
2016-18	House of Cards	Consulting producer	Season 5 & 6
2015	Narcos	Co-executive producer	Season 1
2014	Fear The Walking Dead	Consulting producer	Season 1
2010	The Walking Dead	Co-executive producer	Season 1
2009	Sons of Anarchy	Co-executive producer	Season 2
2008	Sons of Anarchy	Consulting producer	Season 1
2003	Street Time	Consulting producer	Season 1
2002	Resurrection Blvd.	Co-executive producer	Season 3
2001	Resurrection Blvd.	Co-executive producer	Season 3
2001	Resurrection Blvd.	Co-executive producer	Season 2
2000	Resurrection Blvd.	Producer	Season 1
2000	Resurrection Blvd.	Executive Story Editor	Season 1
1996	7th Heaven	Executive Story Editor	Season 1

=== Writer ===
Year	Show	Season	Episode title	Episode	Original airdate	Notes
2015	Fear The Walking Dead	1	"The Dog"	3	13 September 2015	
2010	The Walking Dead	1	"Tell It to the Frogs"	3	14 November 2010	Story co-written with Charles H. Eglee and teleplay co-written with Eglee and Frank Darabont
2009	Sons of Anarchy	2	"Service"	11	17 November 2009	Teleplay co-written with Kurt Sutter from a story by Brady Dahl & Cory Uchida
2009	Sons of Anarchy	2	"Small Tears"	2	15 September 2009	
2008	Sons of Anarchy	1	"Giving Back"	8	22 October 2008	Co-written with Kurt Sutter
2008	Sons of Anarchy	1	"The Pull"	5	1 October 2008	
2008	Crash and Burn	Television feature				Co-written with Frank Hannah
2003	Street Time	2	"Fly Girl"	12	22 October 2003	
2003	Street Time	2	"Cop Killer"	5	3 September 2003	
2002	Resurrection Blvd.	3	"Resureccion"	13	18 September 2002	Co-written with Dennis E. Leoni
2001	Resurrection Blvd.	2	"Lito"	14	25 September 2001	Co-written with Dennis E. Leoni
2001	Resurrection Blvd.	2	"La Partida"	10	28 August 2001	
2001	Resurrection Blvd.	1	"La Visita"	18	8 January 2001	
2000	Resurrection Blvd.	1	"Aniversario"	12	5 November 2000	
2000	Resurrection Blvd.	1	"El Regreso de Paco"	5	17 July 2000	
1997	Dellaventura	1	"In Deadly Fashion"	8	2 December 1997	
1997	7th Heaven	1	"With a Little Help from My Friends"	12	13 January 1997	
1996	7th Heaven	1	"Saturday"	7	4 November 1996	
1992	Dear John USA	4	"Who's Who"	16	12 June 1992	
