= Alicia Clark =

Character in Fear the Walking Dead

- Fear the Walking Dead character
- Alycia Debnam-Carey as Alicia Clark
- First appearance: "Pilot" (2015)
- Last appearance: "The Road Ahead" (2023)
- Created by: Robert Kirkman; Dave Erickson
- Portrayed by: Alycia Debnam-Carey

In-universe information
- Occupation: Volunteer Nurse; High School Student; Co-Leader of the Broke Jaw Ranch community; Personal Nurse for Proctor John; Second-in-Command of the Dell Diamond Baseball Stadium community
- Family: Madison Clark (mother); Nick Clark (brother)
- Significant others: Matt Sale; Jake Otto

Alicia Clark is a fictional character in the AMC television series Fear the Walking Dead, created by Robert Kirkman and Dave Erickson. Portrayed by Alycia Debnam-Carey, Alicia is the daughter of Madison Clark, the former protagonist. She begins the series as a teenager who struggles with her family situation and plans to leave the city for a new life, before facing civilization slowly crumbling due to a zombie outbreak. The character has received praise, with critics calling her an emotional anchor of the series, complimenting her evolution, and naming her one of the most memorable characters of the Walking Dead universe.

== Appearances ==
=== Season 1 ===
Alicia becomes more worried about her brother Nick's chemical dependency. School closes early due to the high levels of absenteeism and rumors of an epidemic. Alicia, her mother Madison, Nick, and Madison's fiancé Travis Manawa choose to flee to the desert, and they want Travis' son Chris, and Chris' mother Liza to follow. Alicia finds her boyfriend Matt ill in his disheveled house. Travis arrives and sees a bite on Matt, who convinces Alicia to leave. The group returns to Madison's home to gather supplies. Travis tells Madison to take the kids to the desert without him; he will catch up. Alicia witnesses her infected neighbor, Mr. Dawson, attacking Mrs. Cruz across the street, but Madison prevents her from intervening. The Manawas and Salazars flee the chaos in the streets. The group reaches Travis' truck and escapes, but Daniel Salazar's wife Griselda is injured by a collapsing scaffold. Unable to reach a hospital, the group drives to Madison's house, from which Alicia, Madison and Nick temporarily flee when Mr. Dawson enters, attracted by the barking dog Nick had let in.

Nick leads Madison and Alicia to the house next door, where they take a shotgun. All three families stay the night and evacuate in the morning. As the Clarks and Manawas start driving away, the National Guard arrives and quarantines the neighborhood into a Safe Zone. Later, Chris shows a video to Travis and Madison of a light signaling from the Dead Zone. Madison exchanges signals with the flashing light in the Dead Zone. She sneaks outside to investigate and finds evidence that the guardsmen killed civilians, including the uninfected. Soldiers take Griselda and Nick to a military hospital while Nick's family attempts to block his departure. Liza agrees to go assist the medical team, despite not wanting to leave Chris. Travis retreats to the roof and sees the signal from the Dead Zone. In the abandoned home of a wealthy family, Alicia and Chris get drunk, play luxury dress-up, and vandalize the home. In a military cell, Victor Strand bribes a guardsman to save a feverish Nick from being moved, and recruits Nick for an escape plot.

The group drives to the National Guard's headquarters to rescue Nick, Liza, and Griselda. Officer Adams agrees to be their guide when let go by Travis. The group infiltrates the base, and Travis, Madison, Daniel and his daughter Ofelia go inside, while Alicia and Chris stay behind. The infected breach the perimeter defenses and swarm the base. Alicia and Chris are threatened by soldiers who want to take their vehicle. Travis' group reach the holding cells and set the detainees free before reuniting with Nick, Liza, and Strand. They try to escape through the medical ward, where Dr. Exner tells them of an escape route, but stays behind. Before they can escape, the group encounters Adams, who shoots Ofelia in the arm. Enraged, Travis brutally beats Adams and leaves him for dead. Strand leads the group to his oceanside mansion, where he tells Nick that he owns a yacht on which they can escape. On the beach, Liza reveals to Madison that she was bitten during the escape. Liza pleads with Madison and Travis to kill her before she turns.

=== Season 2 ===
The city of Los Angeles is bombed by the military. Madison, Alicia, Nick and the others board Strand's yacht, the Abigail, and escape the bombing. Strand refuses to pick up survivors they come across at sea. Strand informs the group they are heading to San Diego. Alicia mans the radio, hears distress calls, and strikes up a conversation with another seaborne survivor named Jack. Alicia learns from Jack that his boat is sinking, and he asks for help. Strand rejects her plan to help Jack and threatens to throw overboard anyone who disobeys him.

The group arrives at a small island where they find a family who inform them that all the cities on the west coast have been bombed, and the borders have been closed. The group is later unable to save the family from the father's suicide plan. Nick, Alicia, Chris, and Daniel scavenge supplies from a plane crash. A herd of walkers attacks them, and the group make their escape with two plane survivors. After debating whether or not to take the new survivors aboard, they decide to tow the survivors in their life raft – until Strand severs the tow line. The group heads to Mexico, the true destination where Strand is headed.

Nick goes ashore to find Strand's contact in Mexico. The group on the yacht is deceived by two people in distress needing to board, and they turn out to be allied with Jack, the man Alicia had communicated with on the radio. The newcomers end up taking over the yacht. When their leader arrives, he takes Alicia and Travis with him and brings the yacht to shore. Nick and Luis, Strand's contact, head back to the Abigail, and help free those on the yacht. They take one hostage to get back Alicia and Travis. Alicia attempts to befriend Jack and find her way back to the yacht on her own, while Travis is locked in a cell. Madison obtains Travis' release by trading him for the infected brother of the leader, and they escape in the mayhem. Alicia breaks free from Jack, and goes with Travis and Madison back to the yacht.

The group arrives in Mexico. While walking to a compound, they are attacked by walkers and Madison is knocked to the ground while Chris stands by watching. Alicia sees this and kills Madison's attacker. The group arrives at the compound, where Luis' mother Celia tells them they can stay but must leave their weapons outside. Alicia tells Chris that she saw him do nothing about Madison's attack. Madison, now aware of what Chris did, tells Travis she thinks he isn't well. Daniel discovers that Celia is keeping the compound's dead family members in the cellar. Madison sleeps with Alicia that night to provide comfort and they are woken by a gunshot to find Chris standing over them holding a knife.

Chris runs off and Travis goes after him. Nick goes after Travis and Chris, and when he finds them Travis says they aren't coming back as he needs to help Chris. He asks Nick to tell Madison he couldn't find them. Celia takes Madison to the cellar to show her the dead, but Madison locks her inside the cell. Daniel goes to where the dead are held and sets the place on fire. Nick tells Madison that he couldn't find Travis and that he is leaving Madison and the group because Celia was right about the group destroying everything in their path, and he no longer wants to be a part of it.

Madison, Alicia, Strand, and Ofelia flee north and find a hotel in the city of Rosarito. A large horde of walkers attack the hotel, trapping all four inside. Ofelia, shaken by losing her father, leaves the group and Alicia on the verge of death. Alicia suggests luring all of the infected into the sea, where the riptide current will carry them away. Madison, Alicia and Strand manage to eliminate the walkers, and together with the survivors of the hotel begin to build a community there.

Upon returning to the hotel from Tijuana for a supply run, where she heard of Nick's survival, Madison turns on the hotel lights against everybody's wishes in hopes of attracting Nick's attention. Alicia argues with Madison, hurt by her mother putting everyone's lives at risk for Nick, and convinces her to respect Nick's decision to leave his family. Madison shuts off the lights, but not before Travis, now alone, sees it. The next morning, survivors who had seen the hotel's lights begin to flock to the hotel gates, but the hotel community refuses to let them enter. Madison spots Travis among the crowd and lets him inside. She later talks with Alicia and reveals to her that her father's car crash was not accidental, but suicide.

Madison sees that the survivors from earlier have been allowed into the hotel compound, and are being checked if they're healthy or sick. Later that night, a new group of survivors arrive at the hotel, among them Brandon and Luke, whom Travis recognizes and asks them about Chris. Travis finds out that Chris was killed by them, and Travis beats them to death, in the process severely injuring Oscar, the leader of the hotel survivors, who tried to stop him. Oscar dies from his injuries. Travis is kicked out of the hotel, and Madison decides to leave with him the following morning. Enraged, several of the hotel survivors break into Travis' room and attack him, forcing Alicia to kill one of them to save Travis' life.

Travis, Madison, and Alicia are forced to flee the hotel while Strand decides to stay behind after helping them escape. They go to the bandits' supermarket, where Madison had traded for medical supplies, and find the entire building abandoned. Alicia questions Madison's motives when she starts searching bodies for clues to find Nick. They arrive at an abandoned community, where Alicia finds a dying Alejandro, his last words instructing them to look for Nick at the border.

=== Season 3 ===
After encountering a military patrol on their way to the border, Alicia and her family are captured and taken to the military installations, where they were separated from Travis. Alicia and Madison meet a militia leader named Troy Otto, who assures them that they would release them once they passed the test. Looking for a way to escape, Alicia lends her balisong to her mother and together devise a plan to escape. Madison assures Alicia that she will not kill again, and Alicia carries out her mother's plan. Madison holds Troy hostage until his brother Jake arrives, who asks Madison to release Troy and takes Alicia and her family to their community. While traveling in a helicopter in the middle of the night, the helicopter is attacked and Travis is fatally wounded. Setting up a small camp for the night, Alicia and an unconscious Luciana stay with Jake. Once they reach Jake's ranch, Alicia informs her mother of Travis' death and Nick threatens Troy with his weapon with the intention of protecting Luciana.

At the ranch, Alicia befriends Gretchen who invites Alicia to join her "Bible study". Later, Alicia, Gretchen, and four other teens meet underground, where they drink, smoke from a bong, and chat. Alicia later begins a sexual relationship with Jake and gradually gains the trust of the ranch community. Madison manages to make peace with the community and convinces their militia to go extract Alicia from the reservation of Qaletaqa, leader of the Native Americans with whom the ranch's leader, Jeremiah Otto, has been in conflict. Alicia later questions her mother's decisions, after which Madison informs her and Nick of her dark past.

The problems in the ranch worsen and they are forced to sacrifice cattle to save water. When Jake asks Alicia to flee with him to start a new life, Alicia declines. Jake accuses Alicia of manipulating him in the way that he thinks Madison and Nick have done to his relatives. Nick informs them that a horde of infected, attracted by Troy (whom Nick covers for), are heading to the ranch. Jake and Nick leave to find Troy, leaving Alicia as the sole leader of the place. Determined to prevent the ranch from being destroyed, Alicia alerts the community of the situation, and they create motorhome barriers in an attempt to prevent the infected from crossing the ranch.

The horde brakes through the barrier, and Alicia and the ranchers fight the walkers until Alicia leads them to a pantry, after mercy killing one of her companions. As the walkers overtake the ranch, Alicia locks herself with Ofelia, Lee, and the remaining residents in the pantry. A number of the residents were bitten, and there is not enough air in the pantry for them to survive for long. While Ofelia and Lee attempt to fix the jammed air vent, Alicia kills the people bitten and others begin to turn into walkers. While fighting for her life Alicia goes unconscious. Ofelia and Lee manage to unblock the vent and Alicia wakes. Alicia becomes the only survivor in the pantry, and is rescued by Madison and her group. Alicia is informed that Jake died and the group has decided to leave for a nearby dam due to the destruction of the ranch. She refuses to go, wanting to visit the place that Jake had told her about, and find her own way.

Alicia ventures through a small town where she finds a fast food restaurant and grabs a bucket of potatoes. Her scavenging attracts the infected. A woman named Diana kills some infected, and after threatening each other, Alicia and her decide to share the food. Spending the night together, the two talk about surviving alone. In the morning, Alicia wakes up to find Diana trying to start a vehicle, and she convinces her to accompany her. As they head to a trade center to exchange the dead parts Diana had collected, a vehicle collides with her car, causing a dizzy Alicia to fight against the bandits. After driving them away with her assault rifle, Alicia takes care of Diana's injured leg and takes her to the infirmary in El Bazar. There, Alicia is enlisted to assist in a life-saving operation on patient John, who is the leader of the Proctors, an outlaw gang opening a trade route from the Texas gulf coast to San Diego and wanting to take control of the dam.

Alicia arrives at Gonzales Dam and finds Strand, who informs her that Madison and Nick are alive and assures her that he will get them all out of the dam if she agrees to help him in the process. Troy had learned that the Proctors intend to attack the dam, and warned Nick. Strand tells Nick to get his family out, having made a deal with the Proctors and no longer being able to guarantee anyone's safety. As the Proctors overrun the dam, Strand takes the detonator and hides Madison and Nick. John arrives at the dam with Alicia, displeased that Strand did not deliver on their deal, and Alicia bargains for Madison's safety. John intends to kill all four, starting with Alicia, and Nick uses the detonator in a standoff, threatening to blow up the dam. Alicia, Madison, and Strand escape on a raft. Nick detonates the explosives, blowing up the dam while the raft is caught in the current.

=== Season 4 ===
Years after the dam explosion, Alicia has taken refuge with Nick, Strand, Luciana and a new girl, Charlie, in a community established by Madison at a baseball stadium in Round Rock, Texas. While out looking for Charlie's missing parents, Alicia and Madison meet Laura, a former nurse on the run.

Charlie is revealed to be a spy for The Vultures, a group led by Melvin and Ennis, both of whom serve as Charlie's guardians. Mel continuously harasses Madison and her family, waiting until they exhaust all of their resources and leave to find a new home so the Vultures can take stadium and their leftover supplies. Madison decides to stay, especially after Alicia and Laura conceive the idea to build a medical facility at the stadium. Nick and Luciana find fresh soil and produce to grow new crops, after Charlie secretly destroyed their previous vegetables with pests. Melvin accepts that Madison and the community in the stadium will continue to thrive and leaves. However, Ennis is bent on seizing the stadium and unleashes a horde of walkers doused in oil toward the stadium. To save Alicia, Nick, and the other members of the community, Madison herds the walkers inside of the stadium using a flare; she locks herself inside with the walkers and immolates them with the flare, causing an explosion and sacrificing herself in the process.

Months later, Alicia, Nick, Strand and Luciana, determined to get revenge on the Vultures for causing Madison's death, cross paths with Althea, John Dorie and Morgan Jones. Nick finds Ennis and kills him. Nick is subsequently killed by Charlie, and dies surrounded by Alicia, Luciana and Strand.

Alicia finds and confronts Melvin, and it is revealed that Laura joined Melvin's group after the destruction of the stadium. Enraged at this discovery, Alicia pivots and aims her gun at Laura, but instead, shoots John in the abdomen after John steps in front of Laura to protect her. A gunfight ensues, which ends with Alicia killing Melvin with her sharpened barrel shroud. Alicia makes it her mission to kill Laura and prevent her from saving John, as she believes Laura was with the Vultures from the beginning and thus had a hand in Madison's demise. Morgan convinces Alicia to stand down, reminding her that Madison would not have wanted her to become a killer and that killing Laura won't solve anything and will only cause an innocent man (John) to die. Alicia breaks down crying and leaves with Morgan. Laura reveals her real name to be June. After burying Nick, Alicia, Strand and Luciana part ways with Morgan's newfound group.

Weeks later, Alicia is emotionally damaged and broken after the death of her mother and brother. She takes refuge inside an abandoned house during a hurricane, and soon discovers Charlie is hiding there. Alicia expresses her rage and sadness at Charlie and is afraid she'll kill Charlie if they stay together. She later finds out that Charlie, guilt ridden over murdering Nick, came to the house with the intention of killing herself. The two are unable to leave the house because of the storm outside, so they resolve to wait it out together. The storm becomes too severe and Alicia and Charlie are forced to go inside the basement. However, they become trapped inside as the basement floods with water. Charlie panics when she realizes she is going to drown. Not wanting to become a walker after she dies, Charlie begs Alicia to shoot her in the head, but Alicia is reminded of what her mother died for and cannot bring herself to pull the trigger. A walker trapped atop a tree by the house falls and collapses on the exit hatch of the basement, allowing Alicia and Charlie to leave. Alicia resolves to bring Charlie with her.

Alicia and Charlie are eventually reunited with Morgan, Strand, Luciana, Althea, John and June, and newcomers. The group are soon attacked by Martha, a woman who lost her mind after the death of her husband. The group take refuge inside a hospital, but the building becomes surrounded by walkers. Later on, Martha poisons Alicia and the group with anti-freeze, but they are saved by Morgan, when he arrives with alcohol.

At the end of the season, Alicia has found a new purpose in life and, wanting to honor her mother's memory, joins Morgan in his mission to find other survivors and help them however they can.

=== Season 5 ===
Prior to the events of the fifth season, Alicia and her friends spend weeks searching for people to help, with little success. They are contacted by a man named Logan, who says he is in need of assistance. Alicia and the group board a plane, provided by Daniel Salazar, to travel to Logan's location. The plane malfunctions and crashes in a forest. Alicia emerges from the crash site and meets young brothers, Max and Dylan. She discovers that the area they have crash-landed in is potentially radioactive. Surrounded by walkers, Alicia and her group are rescued by Max and Dylan's older sister, Annie. It is revealed that Logan was lying about being in trouble in order to have Morgan's group leave the factory they were using as a home, so that he could take it back.

Alicia and Morgan meet Grace, a former employee of a nearby nuclear power plant. The nuclear power plant suffered a meltdown shortly after the apocalypse began and everyone in the surrounding area died from radiation. Grace survived but she believes she is infected and will soon show symptoms, although she is not entirely sure. Grace warns Alicia and Morgan not to go near walkers that show signs of radioactive poisoning.

Alicia is determined to help Annie and her brothers. Annie reveals to Alicia that her parents died from radioactive exposure after the first meltdown of the nuclear power plant. Annie is convinced that the only way to keep her brothers safe is for them to stay where they are. However, Alicia tells them that they will not survive for long if they stay alone and reject help from others. Annie refuses to join Alicia, and believes that Alicia only wants to help them because she is trying to relieve her own conscience after all of the wrongful actions she committed in her past. While trying to protect Annie, her brothers and the other children in Annie's care from a horde of walkers, Alicia is splashed with the blood of a radioactive walker after she stabs one. Alicia is worried that she may be infected and asks Grace for help. Grace decontaminates her, but Alicia decides to stop using her weapon and takes a hiatus from killing any more walkers.

Grace tries to keep the power plant running, but eventually, another meltdown is triggered and it becomes imperative that everyone leave the area. The group begins repairing the crashed plane using parts from another plane, also owned by Daniel. Meanwhile, John Dorie and June cross paths with Dwight, who has been looking for his wife, Sherry. The three of them reunite with Alicia and the group. The plane is successfully repaired and the group flies out just as the power plant completely melts down. When the plane lands in another city, Alicia is joyfully reunited with Daniel, who is ready for a fresh start after living alone.

Several weeks later, Alicia and Strand meet and help Wes, a survivor with a hobby for painting. Alicia is inspired by Wes to paint herself, using this as a therapeutic method to get over her temporary fear of killing walkers and find a purpose again.

Alicia and her group struggle to find a permanent home, and with resources dwindling, survival becomes increasingly difficult. Their situation changes once the group are confronted by Virginia, the leader of multiple factions of communities stationed all over Texas. Morgan does not agree with Virginia's methods and utilitarianism, and instead wants to establish a place where everyone is welcome and not turned away because they are sick, have a troubled past or are deemed unnecessary.

Morgan's group declines Virginia's offer to join her and, eventually, travel to Humbug's Gulch, an abandoned Western-style park. However, the place is overrun by walkers. With no resources or strength to fight them, Morgan is forced to call Virginia for help, knowing that she will separate them all into different communities. Virginia and her rangers arrive. Before Alicia is taken away to one of Virginia's communities, she speaks with Strand, who tells her, "We can do more damage from the inside." After everyone is taken away from the Gulch, Virginia shoots Morgan and leaves him to be eaten alive by walkers. It is revealed in the sixth season, that Alicia heard the shot and Morgan's final message on the radio.

=== Season 6 ===
Alicia is stationed with Strand at Lawton, the main hub of Virginia's network of communities in Texas. While at Lawton, Alicia meets Dakota, who reveals herself to be Virginia's younger sister.

After Strand assaults one of Virginia's rangers, Virginia sentences Alicia and Strand to work at an abandoned factory, and orders them to clear out walkers standing in the way of a "weapon" she wants to obtain and utilize against a doomsday cult that is spray-painting the threatening message, "THE END IS THE BEGINNING" throughout her settlements. Alicia is later reunited with Charlie. Alicia discovers that Dakota had come in the vehicle that took her and Strand to the factory. They all work together to defeat the walkers. Unbeknownst to Alicia, Strand murders one of the workers by using him as bait to lure the walkers away from her and the others so that they could kill them.

When Virginia arrives, she reveals that there never was any weapon and that killing the walkers was a test to prove that they were capable of fighting. Virginia promotes Strand to a leadership position and asks him to create an army of soldiers for her. Knowing that he is going to have to do more reprehensible things in order to win Virginia over, Strand sends Alicia to a different community far away from him. Having grown close to Alicia, Strand tells her he cares about how she views him and cannot bear for her to forget the goodness in him.

Alicia is stationed with Charlie and is bitter over Strand sending her away. When Dakota goes missing, Strand enlists the help of Alicia to find her. Knowing that there will be consequences for herself and her friends if Dakota is not found, Alicia goes with Charlie to locate her. They eventually find Dakota taking shelter inside of a cabin owned by a former taxidermist, Ed. Dakota reveals that she fled to get away from Virginia, and says that Virginia murdered their parents. Ed tries to keep Alicia, Charlie and Dakota trapped inside the house. He then plays music on a loud stereo to draw in walkers. Ed dies, and they are saved from the walkers breaking into the cabin by Morgan. Alicia is shocked, but glad, to see that Morgan is alive.

When Morgan suggests trading Dakota for their friends, Alicia is tells him that was her initial plan, but she now disagrees. Morgan relents and agrees to take Dakota with them back to the stronghold he is in the process of building. When Strand arrives to collect Dakota, Alicia refuses to give her up. Strand points a gun at Alicia and she holds her defense with her weapon. Her trust in him has declined due to his history of betraying people and altering his position on matters as it suits his needs. Strand lowers his weapon, but claims that his allegiance to Virginia will get them out. Alicia later contemplates returning to the baseball stadium and rebuilding it into her own community, like her mother did.

Alicia, Charlie and Dakota go with Morgan to the place he's building, a washed-out dam. Soon after, Morgan and Dakota cross paths with John Dorie, whom Dakota kills. Morgan has a standoff with Virginia, and takes a wounded Virginia to the dam. Strand, now in control of Virginia's rangers, shows up to kill Virginia. Alicia agrees to talk to Strand and convince him to relent. However, Virginia accepts responsibility for the conflict and agrees to be executed on the condition that Morgan kill her himself. Morgan initially agrees, but changes his mind, not wanting for any more blood to be spilt. Morgan forces Virginia to tell Dakota the truth that she is Dakota's biological mother.

Morgan, Alicia, and June agree to let Virginia and Dakota go, on the condition that they leave Texas. Alicia and Morgan leave the room while June changes Virginia's bandages. June learns that Virginia protected Dakota after Dakota killed one of Virginia's rangers, and that's why Dakota killed John. June is angered by Virginia's excuses and executes her.

Several weeks later, Alicia goes on a supply run with Althea, Luciana, and Wes. They come across the inhabitants of an underground bunker. They discover that they are in the midst of a doomsday cult led by Teddy, a former mortician, who plan on remaining locked inside of the bunker indefinitely. Alicia burns down the embalmed walkers the cult keeps stored for processing, allowing Al, Luciana and Wes to escape. Alicia is held captive, after which she meets Teddy.

Dakota stows away on one of the Teddy's scout buses, posing as one of his followers. She plans on killing Teddy and asks Alicia to join her, but Alicia refuses, making it clear that they are not friends and she will not accept Dakota due her actions despite Alicia having helped her. While out on a special trip with Teddy, Alicia and Dakota come across survivors from the baseball stadium whom Alicia believed to have died. However, Cole holds them hostage, demanding to know more about Teddy's underground bunker. Alicia ultimately escapes and kills Cole. Teddy is impressed with Alicia's resolve and desires her to be the new leader of his followers after he dies. Teddy reveals that he plans on launching a nuclear missile from an abandoned beached-submarine in Galveston to destroy Texas, as he believes old things have to die in order for new life to rebuild. Dakota betrays Alicia and joins Teddy's side. Alicia warns Strand and Morgan about Teddy's plan, before his crew capture her.

Teddy takes Alicia to another underground bunker he and his followers found at a hotel and locks her inside. He wants Alicia to rebuild the new world after he is gone, but Alicia angrily says that she will not make the world the way he wants it to be. Teddy turns to her as he leaves and says, "I know. That's what I'm counting on." Alicia is trapped inside the bunker for the remainder of the season and, as a result, survives the nuclear fallout.

=== Season 7 ===
As shown in flashbacks, following the events of season six, Alicia fails to escape the bunker. She meets Will, a survivor who has been in the bunker since the start of the apocalypse, and a former aide of Senator Elias Vazquez. Teddy's followers, led by Arno, found the bunker and killed everyone inside, including Vazquez, while Will hid. Alicia meets Arno, who was told by Teddy that she was the new leader.

Alicia finds files of a secret government-established settlement called PADRE, of which only Vazquez knew the location. Alicia hopes with Will that Vazquez's reanimated corpse can subconsciously remember the location of PADRE and help lead them there. Alicia and Will try to find a way out of the bunker through its tunnels, taking Vazquez's body with them. As Teddy launches the nuclear missile, the tunnel collapses and Alicia becomes trapped with Vazquez. Vazquez bites Alicia on the arm, and after making Will promise that he kill her if she shows signs of not healing, she despairingly amputates her arm. Will breaks his promise because he has fallen in love with her. Alicia is angered at this, and spends the next few days in isolation. Will leaves the bunker. In present time, Alicia is still running a fever that does not subside. She fears that she did not amputate her arm in time and will soon succumb to her sickness.

Alicia and Teddy's followers leave the bunker and search for PADRE, using Vazquez as a guide. A number of them die due to the unsafe conditions of the fallout. Arno blames Alicia for their deaths and he and few other members of Teddy's cult split from Alicia and form their own crew, "The Stalkers". Dwight and Sherry are found by Alicia's group and are taken in. Dwight fills Alicia in on what happened since she's been gone, including Strand's attempt to kill Morgan in order to be seen as a hero. Strand has found and built a stronghold that he is running as a totalitarian dictator, holding some of Morgan's group while rejecting shelter for others.

Alicia is disgusted with Strand's actions and no longer wants anything to do with him. Their search for PADRE proves unsuccessful when Alicia mistakes Strand's Tower for the settlement. There, Alicia discovers Will's corpse. Strand admits to killing him because Will said he loved Alicia, and Strand needed to create distance between him and Alicia in order to be a ruthless leader, which he cannot do with Alicia near him. This proves to be the final straw for Alicia, who declares war on Strand, vowing to take the tower from him, and knowing that Morgan and their friends won't survive long in the beached-submarine they've been sheltering in.

While out searching for people to fight alongside her in her mission to take Strand's tower, Alicia passes out in the middle of the road, but is rescued by Paul, a deaf man. Alicia's illness worsens and, as a result, she becomes plagued with dreams and hallucinations, particularly of a mysterious young girl hiding her identity with a gas mask. Alicia and Paul are pursued by Arno and his group. The two of them hatch a plan to escape them, with Paul sacrificing his life so Alicia can get away. Alicia passes out again, but is found by Morgan. She deduces that the voices she hears in her dreams are her own, telling her what to do. Alicia decides to travel back to Teddy's bunker and retrieve a transmitter that will broadcast a message to call others to her; she decides that if she can't find the real PADRE, she will create PADRE herself by building it inside of Strand's tower. After retrieving the transmitter, Alicia helps Morgan, Dwight and Sherry shepherd and trap the horde of walkers from Strand's tower following Morgan into the bunker. As Alicia and her group head to Strand's tower to attack, Morgan decides to leave the fallout area with baby Mo to protect her, and he and Alicia bid each other farewell.

Once they arrive at the Tower, Alicia and Daniel enter the building. Daniel's mental state is compromised and he believes Strand is holding his dead daughter Ofelia captive. Wes, having lost faith in Morgan and Alicia's groups, has joined Strand's side. Strand reveals gathered a horde of walkers from a crater and is having his army lead them to Alicia's friends. Strand keeps Alicia locked in the tower so that she cannot warn them. Alicia overpowers Strand and demands he take her to the roof so she can turn off the beacon light drawing the radioactive walkers in. Alicia appeals to Strand's emotions, and makes a deal with him: she will live with him in the tower if he promises to call off the walkers. Strand agrees, but Wes believes Alicia is only playing Strand. Wes and other rangers turn on Strand. Strand tells Alicia that he loves her and views her as a daughter. Daniel demands Strand take him to Ofelia, but Strand and Alicia insist Ofelia died in Mexico. Angered, Daniel threatens to kill Strand for lying to him, but Alicia talks him down, encouraging him to be the man he wanted Ofelia to see.

Alicia and Strand reach the roof, but they are intercepted by Wes. Alicia attempts to appeal to Wes, but Strand murders him. Just as he is about to turn off the beacon light, Strand has second thoughts about Alicia's motivations. He doesn't believe Alicia will truly forgive him after everything he's done and decides not to turn off the light. The two of them brawl. Alicia's metal arm pierces a tank of oil and the beacon light collapses, causing an electrical cord to strike the oil and start a fire. She climbs to the top of the tower and uses her transmitter to call others to her in order to help them clear out the oncoming horde of radioactive walkers. However, her illness gets the best of her and she faints. Strand rescues her and she is reunited with her group just before the herd reaches the tower, while he stays behind.

As Alicia's group prepares to the leave the fallout area via rafts, Alicia hallucinates the young girl again. The girl claims she knows the location of PADRE, but that she needs to find her "friend" before she goes there. With the help of her friends, Alicia clears out the walkers surrounding the entrance to the tower, but resolves to enter the burning building on her own. She finds Strand inebriated on the top floor, and they talk about their failures and hopes. Alicia is about to shoot herself with her only bullet before her hallucination saves her from doing so. She realizes that the girl she has been hallucinating is a younger version of herself and a manifestation of her own subconscious. Alicia rescues Strand, whom she considers family, and they head back to her group at the beach. Unwilling to risk putting them in danger when she succumbs to her illness, Alicia elects to stay behind while the others escape in the rafts. After saying goodbye to them, she stays alone on the beach and collapses.

Alicia is then shown awaken and healthy at the beach. She speaks to her unconscious manifestation of her younger self, telling her she finally feels like herself. She decides to go find the people who heard her broadcast message and are on their way to the burning tower, and redirect them to safety. She puts on her gas mask and makes her way there. A lone walker approaches her and she uses her last bullet on it.

=== Season 8 ===
Alicia's prosthetic arm is shown in the possession of an unknown survivor. Troy Otto, who is revealed to have survived, claims that he had killed Alicia and left her as a walker, giving Madison her daughter's prosthetic arm as proof.

Madison subsequently searches for Alicia to lay her to rest, but Troy cuts off the arms of a number of walkers and releases them to make it harder for Madison to find Alicia. Troy's daughter Tracy, who is shown to be wearing Alicia's medallion necklace, later claims that Alicia was killed in a mansion near Fort Worth, Texas. Strand encounters a group of survivors who were all saved by Alicia in one way or another and are keeping her alive for people. The group explains that, after everyone left, Alicia rescued dozens of survivors who had heard her message and escaped Texas with them in Al's SWAT van using fuel from the Tower. Alicia had then traveled around helping survivor groups until Troy had apparently killed her. Troy later reveals that, when his wife Serena was pregnant, she got bit and Alicia responded to their distress call. Despite her tumultuous history with Troy, Alicia had saved Serena by amputating her arm, inspiring Serena to follow in Alicia's path and help others in turn. However, while answering a distress call, Serena was robbed and killed, something that the grief-stricken Troy had blamed Madison and Alicia for.

Madison later kills Troy by fatally impaling him with Alicia's prosthetic arm, believing that Alicia giving Troy a second chance had led to her daughter's death. Before dying, Troy claims that his daughter Tracy is actually Alicia's and that Troy had kidnapped her from Alicia. Troy's second-in-command Russell later reveals that Alicia might actually still be alive: Alicia and Troy had gotten into a fight that had left them both seriously wounded, and Troy stabbed with Alicia's arm which is how he had gotten it. When Russell went to check on Alicia, he had only found the knife that Troy had used to stab her, a bloody mattress and bloody footprints, suggesting that Alicia had survived and escaped. Russell had then gone on to lie to Troy that Alicia had died and turned, telling Troy what he had wanted to hear.

After the destruction of PADRE, a still alive Alicia is finally reunited with Madison, having heard the story of her mother seemingly sacrificing herself again to save everyone. Alicia reveals that she's not Tracy's mother, although she did know Serena when Tracy was just a baby. Troy had lied to Madison in order to ensure that Madison would take care of his daughter. Alicia discreetly returns Daniel's long-lost cat Skidmark to him, having found the cat on her travels and she and Madison reveal their survival to Strand. However, having both seen how they had inspired others with their sacrifice, Madison and Alicia decide to let everyone think that they had died and to return to Los Angeles with Tracy to help rebuild their old home.

== Development ==
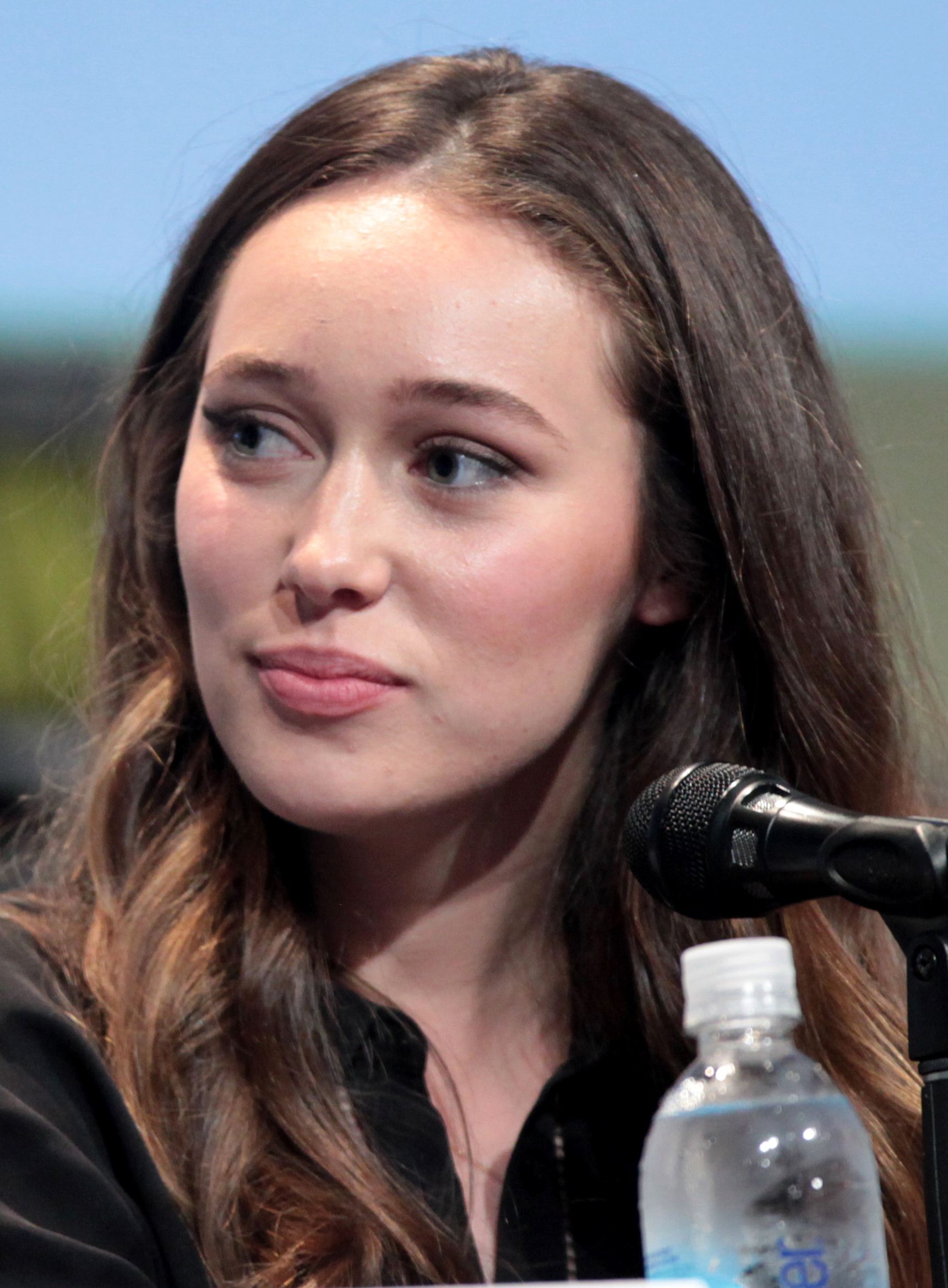
Alica Clark is portrayed by Alycia Debnam-Carey (pictured)

At the start of the series, Alicia is an "ambitious teen and model student" who is wanting to leave home to get away from her dysfunctional family and start college. Co-creator Robert Kirkman described her as an "atypical teenager", excelling at school and being self-sufficient and self-reliant; "she's kind of the model child". Showrunner Dave Erickson said Alicia "had a really specific, defined idea of who she was and where she was going", and being more "fatalistic" in her thinking, she "has to work through that and process it".

Alicia is the antithesis of her brother Nick, with whom she is at odds. For Nick, who is "a parent's worst nightmare", Kirkman said, "it's exacerbated [things] to be next to this perfect sister who seemingly doesn't have anything going on in her life that is negative. But that's not really the case, that's just his perception." Debnam-Carey said that Alicia and her brother had a close connection as kids, but the loss of their father and their new situation "takes them on very different paths." Their relationship is "fractured" and "it's going to take time to rebuild", she noted. "Because Nick has gone off, she's had to be very self-sufficient ... and that goes against [her] in some way". Her brother "gets all the attention because he's the one that's screwing up", while she is also "saddled with caring for him".

Alicia starts "in a difficult place" as well as "a much more hopeful place", Debnam-Carey said. She is "the only one who has ambitions and goals", and had to "compensate" for her brother. She felt emotionally "cut off" from her family, so she tried to protect herself from that and "decided to make a choice for herself". Maureen Ryan in HuffPost said that the character's "dreams were her lifeline to get out of a difficult situation". Bridget Liszewski of The TV Junkies wrote, "Alicia lost a parent, had an addicted brother that monopolized much of her mother's time and concern, and saw everything she had worked towards for her future being ripped away." When everything falls apart, she "has the most to lose, and she's roped back into this situation she's really trying to escape from."

The character is initially very skeptical about the events occurring in the city. Debnam-Carey said that most people in that situation would attempt to rationalize everything and make "logic out of something absurd". There is a lot of "uncertainty in the beginning", she noted, and people think that those infected are merely sick and the situation may be temporary. Alicia is "kept in the dark more than everyone else" and her family "wants to keep at least someone safe and innocent and protected." Erik Kain of Forbes called Alicia early on in the first season, "the optimist, the type of character who will go out of her way to help another, in spite of her cold exterior." For the character, it becomes about "her figuring out this world, and it will also coincide with her recognizing her place, within herself, and knowing then, what she's going to do about it", Debnam-Carey said.

In the second season, Alicia tries to connect with the voice of another survivor, which gives her "a sense of normalcy", Fred Topel wrote for Rotten Tomatoes. "She's only just coming to terms with a lot of the information and events that have taken place", Debnam-Carey said. "She's tried to take the initiative and do something helpful", and having been a short amount of time since the outbreak, "you don't suddenly relinquish those habits of just wanting a connection with someone". Liszewski said that Alicia yearned to "hang on to any last bit of humanity that she could find", and after her mistake was confirmed, she "wasted no time stepping up and taking full responsibility" and "went to work setting things right". The character becomes a "young woman who is growing more confident by the day", proving "on multiple occasions that she won't sit idly by while a group of adults decide her fate". Forced to grow up quickly, Alicia had to face "harsh realities" and take a "direct stand against her mother" several times, staying resolute "in what she thought was best." Debnam-Carey said, "It's the first time she's been able to step into that leadership role ... and proving herself as an equal." Alicia begins to think that what is "important is what's in front of you". Her dynamic with her mother is "filled with tension for a long time, because of the fact that Nick has been running off, and fueled by Travis becoming part of the family, and the two of them finally come head-to-head."

In his review of the third season's "This Land is Your Land", David Zapanta of Den of Geek described Alicia as "bold but not fearless, brave but vulnerable, elated yet in mourning", and "at her most vulnerable". She is "the flip side of [Nick and Troy's recklessness], thinking before she acts", while "her choices weigh heavily on her." "Killing the living—even in the name of the greater good—has killed something vital in Alicia that she will likely never get back", Zapanta wrote. She knows that "safety is an illusion ... so it makes sense that she's striking off by herself", and is then "at least able to live and die on her own terms." The character has had "a real growth", Debnam-Carey proposed. She "went from being a normal teenage girl before the apocalypse to someone who has been really ravaged by it." Alicia emerged as a leader and a fighter.

In the fourth season, Alicia becomes the only surviving character introduced in the series premiere. This season, Alicia's journey has her "struggling to emulate the hero that Madison ended up becoming" while dealing with loss of both her brother and her mother, wrote Ian Sandwell of Digital Spy. She is confronted with the decision to forgive or take vengeance on a child, a choice that gives her a new perspective and role. Morgan reaching out to Alicia later compels her to accept companionship and search it for others. Alicia "can come back to finding herself", Debnam-Carey said. She "is able to face her demons and also have such generosity, empathy and forgiveness, and come to some sort of relief with her relationship with Charlie, who has basically destroyed her family." It is the "beginning of Alicia as a new person", and she chooses to be a "protector of sorts" in her journey for redemption, while remaining a realist.

Liam Mathews of TV Guide described Alicia as "a normal kid" who grows "into a wily survivor tormented by inner demons". In a 2020 interview, Debnam-Carey commented on a potential father/daughter flashback scene between Alicia and her deceased father: "I'm always for showing some of the more revealing aspects of a character, before this whole apocalypse ... But I do think now she has had to work through so much pain and grief and we're on the other side of it in a way."

== Reception ==
Alicia became a fan favorite character as viewers have "watched her grow from a callow young woman to a confident and strong force of nature." Alicia and her brother Nick were the series' emotional anchors from the beginning, Vanity Fair's Laura Bradley wrote, "especially Alicia, whose insistently open heart was a welcome presence in this cruel world". Debnam-Carey's performance in the series has received acclaim, especially for the third season episode "This Land Is Your Land" and fourth season episode "Close Your Eyes". E.A. Hanks of The New York Times declared the "most moving aspect" of season two to be "the relationship between Madison and Alicia, particularly after the fall of the Abigail compound". [Dickens and] Debnam-Carey, "whose thoughtful performance continues to deepen, are completely honest as mother and daughter." The TV Junkies's Bridget Lissewski said the second season benefited from Alicia's more central role and character growth, appreciating that her storyline has evolved "without the services of any sort of romantic relationship".

David Zapanta of Den of Geek regarded Alicia as one of the "more fully realized characters" of the third season. Emily Hannemann of TV Insider considered the "Bible study" meeting in the episode "TEOTWAWKI" "one of Alicia's most profound and chilling moments on the series." Reviewing "This Land is Your Land", Paul Tassi of Forbes wrote, "The entire sequence with Alicia in the bunker is one of the best pieces of zombie fiction I've seen in years." Zapanta said the episode is one of the strongest of the series, crediting Debnam-Carey's performance for anchoring a "transformative" hour of television. Digital Spy's Ben Lee felt the character "truly excelled in the episode." Hannemann called the episode a "love letter to Alicia's development throughout the first three seasons", with Alicia showing she has what it takes to lead. IGN's Matt Fowler said the episode "had an amazing, harrowing Alicia-centric story inside of it - one that really helped shape her character". Writing for Forbes, Erik Kain said Debnam-Carey's performance "elevated the show beyond anything it had been before."

Bradley of Vanity Fair regarded season four's "Close Your Eyes" as Debnam-Carey's "most powerful performance yet, one that proved Alicia still has a lot of story left", naming Alicia the series' "strongest throughline" who "can also still be the most fascinating to watch." Tassi considered it a "fantastic" episode anchored by the actress, stating that "in Alicia she's created one of the most impressive, memorable characters in the entire Walking Dead universe across either show." CarterMatt.com said "Close Your Eyes" provided "a chance to dive into Alicia's head like never before as she continued much of her isolation from the world", while Debnam-Carey gave an "outstanding" performance. Kain said the episode is one of the series' best and it reinforced his view that Alicia "should become the central protagonist of the show". ComicBook.com's Brandon Davis felt the actress "brilliantly delivered on an intensely heartfelt script", with a performance as strong as her "This Land is Your Land" work. Zapanta said Alicia is "a house divided against herself" in the "powerful" episode, with "arguably a career-defining performance from Debnam-Carey". Ray Flook of Bleeding Cool considered it a "very important" episode for the character to move forward, navigating an "impressive" arc and cycle of duality and inner conflict. Praising Debnam-Carey's portrayal, Flook credited her for "almost single-handedly renewing [his] faith in where [the season] was going". Ian Sandwell of Digital Spy called the episode a "gripping showcase" for the actress, who makes "the sudden shifts [in sentiments] work", noting that the show "soars" when it gives focus to Alicia.

After the fifth season premiere, Hannemann said the series has "made a definitive statement about Alicia's survival abilities, her toughness and her capacity to make decisions for not only herself, but those following her", and this along with her character journey makes her deserving of the group's leadership. In his review of season six's "Mother", Tassi lamented that Alicia has become "little more than a background character" in recent years, "but she's still got the magic when the show gives her a chance like they did", deeming the episode "one of the most compelling" the series has had in a while. Discussing the recent seasons, Kain also expressed disappointment with the character's screen time, stating that Alicia has barely featured in the story, was "neutered", and "relegated to a secondary character who ... doesn't even act like herself anymore", blaming the "short shrift" of the original cast on the series' new showrunners. Starburst magazine wrote of season seven episode "PADRE", "The return of Debnam-Carey as the impassioned and resourceful Alicia is a potent reminder of how much her recent absence has been to the show's detriment." For the episode, Paul Dailly of TV Fanatic wrote, "When your most popular character disappears for half a season, you need to bring them back in a blaze of glory, but all we got was more torment for Alicia", adding that her arm amputation was "harrowing" and she deserves better storylines while the current one needs "a considerable payoff". Jake Gleason of Screen Rant said that Morgan's expanded protagonist role over the past few seasons came at the expense of Alicia's role, which the show has possibly acknowledged in "PADRE".

Christine Persaud of Screen Rant wrote in 2021: "Alicia has had the most compelling character arc. She began as an afraid young woman living in her troubled brother's shadow and evolved into a fierce, confident, and ruthless fighter. While Alicia has suffered through periods of sadness, unsure of herself and her abilities ... she is relatable and someone who has taken tough situations and done her best to overcome them." In January 2022, Comic Book Resources stated that Alicia's evolution from the beginning of the series "remains one of Fear the Walking Dead most captivating character arcs", while Debnam-Carey's performance has made her "a vital part" of the series.
