= Madison Clark =

Main protagonist in the first four seasons of 'Fear the Walking Dead

- Fear the Walking Dead character
- Kim Dickens as Madison Clark
- First appearance: "Pilot" (2015)
- Last appearance: "The Road Ahead" (2023)
- Created by: Robert Kirkman; Dave Erickson
- Portrayed by: Kim Dickens

In-universe information
- Alias: Lark
- Occupation: Bartender; Guidance Counselor; Leader of the Rosarito Beach Hotel; Second-in-Command of the Broke Jaw Ranch Militia; Leader of the Dell Diamond Baseball Stadium community
- Spouse: Steven Clark
- Significant other: Travis Manawa (engaged)
- Children: Nick Clark (son); Alicia Clark (daughter)
- Nationality: American

Madison Clark is a fictional character and the protagonist of the first four and eighth seasons of the AMC television series Fear the Walking Dead. She is portrayed by Kim Dickens, and created by Robert Kirkman and former showrunner Dave Erickson. Madison is a former high school guidance counselor, Nick and Alicia's mother, and Travis Manawa's fiancée.

== Character biography ==
Madison is described as intelligent and willful to the point that she sometimes becomes forceful. She is quick to adapt to the new world, likes being in control of situations, and is prone to feeling tense during disagreements with others or in situations where she is largely powerless.

=== Season 1 ===
After Nick wakes up in a heroin den in an abandoned church, he is hit by a car and hospitalized, and the doctor tells Madison and Travis that Nick's perception of the incident is drug-induced. Nick escapes and meets with the drug dealer, Calvin, who is mortally wounded after trying to kill him. After Travis and Madison arrive, the zombified Calvin attacks them. Nick runs over Calvin repeatedly with Travis's truck, and they flee to the desert, inviting Alicia, Liza, and Chris to follow.

The group returns to Madison's home to gather supplies. Nick suffers from heroin withdrawal, so Madison drives to her school to get him oxycodone, where she encounters Tobias scavenging for food. A zombified Artie is killed while trying to bite Tobias. Travis later tells Madison to take the kids to the desert without him. Alicia witnesses her zombified neighbor, Mr. Dawson, attacking Mrs. Cruz across the street, but Madison prevents her from intervening.

A mob sets fire to the store adjoining the barbershop, forcing the Salazars and Manawas to flee. The group reaches Travis's truck and escapes, but Griselda is injured by a collapsing scaffold. Unable to reach a hospital, the group drives to Madison's house, where Nick, Madison, and Alicia temporarily flee when Mr. Dawson attempts to enter, attracted by the barking dog Nick had let in. Nick leads Madison and Alicia to the Trans' house next door, where they take a shotgun. Travis arrives and is attacked by Mr. Dawson, who is killed. The next morning, as the Clarks and Manawas begin to drive away, the National Guard arrives and quarantines the block.

Madison discovers Daniel detaining Adams in the Trans' basement.

Travis, Madison, Daniel, and Ofelia go inside the National Guard's headquarters to rescue Liza, Griselda, and Nick, while Alicia and Chris stay behind. Meanwhile, the walkers breach the perimeter defenses and swarm the base. Travis's group reaches the holding cells and sets the detainees free before reuniting with Nick, Liza, and Strand. They try to escape through the medical ward, where they discover Dr. Exner has euthanized all of the patients.

Exner tells them of an escape route before presumably committing suicide. Before they can escape, the group encounters Adams, who shoots Ofelia in the arm. Enraged, Travis brutally beats Adams and leaves him for dead. Strand leads the group to his oceanside mansion, where he reveals to Nick that he owns a yacht which he plans to escape on, called the Abigail. On the beach, Liza reveals to Madison that she had been bitten during the escape. Liza pleads with Madison and Travis to euthanize her before she turns. Travis promises to protect Chris before shooting Liza.

=== Season 2 ===
The group evacuates to the Abigail as the military bombs Los Angeles in an attempt to contain the outbreak. Out at sea, the group comes across another boat full of survivors, but Strand refuses to pick them up and informs the group they are heading to San Diego.

The group docks on a nearby island to escape the pursuit of the unknown ship. They have to leave because George poisoned his entire family as part of a suicide pact, and the group is forced to leave George's family behind on the island.

The group later plans to use the hostage as bait to get back Travis and Alicia. Alicia attempts to befriend Jack and find her way home on her own, while Travis is locked in a cell. Chris is left to watch over the hostage and ends up shooting him in the face, killing him. He tells Madison the boy was turning, but she is worried that he is becoming unhinged.

Travis sees Alex with Jack's group, and she admits to him that she volunteered information on them when she was found. Madison is able to free Travis by trading him for the now-turned brother of the leader, and they escape in the mayhem. Alicia breaks free from Jack and returns to the yacht with Travis and Madison. As they walk to the compound, the group is attacked by the dead, and Madison is knocked to the ground while Chris stands by watching, which Alicia sees before killing Madison's attacker. The group arrives at the compound and is greeted by Luis' mother Celia who tells them they can stay but must leave their weapons outside. Alicia tells Chris what she saw regarding Madison's attack.

Madison, aware of what Chris did, tells Travis she thinks he is not well, and they argue about her inability to want to help Chris when Travis was always willing to help Nick. Daniel discovers that Celia is keeping the compound's dead family members in the cellar. Madison decides to sleep with Alicia that night to provide comfort and they are woken by a gunshot to find Chris standing over them, holding a knife and they chase him from the room. Chris runs off and Travis chases him.

Nick brings Celia's walker son Luis to her and because of this, she lets the group stay, but Strand must leave. Madison talks to Nick about his fascination with the dead and is frustrated by his feelings for Celia. Nick finds Travis and Chris, but Travis says he and Chris are not coming back and he needs to help Chris. He asks Nick to tell Madison he could not find them. Celia takes Madison to the cellar to show her the dead, but Madison locks her inside the cell.

When the burning building goes up in flames, Strand returns to the compound to help the rest of the group escape the fire, but when Madison sees Nick, he lies about Travis, and tells her he is not going with them because Celia was right about the group destroying everything in their path, and he no longer wants to be a part of it. Madison, Strand, Alicia, and Ofelia flee Celia's burning estate, intending to get back to the Abigail.

The group discovers that the Abigail has been stolen, and they are forced to scavenge a nearby hotel for supplies. Madison and Strand get drunk in the bar as they express their various frustrations with life. However, a large horde of walkers attacks the hotel, trapping all four inside.

Madison turns on the hotel lights against everybody's wishes in hopes of attracting Nick's attention, though Alicia convinces her to respect Nick's decision to choose death over their family, despite becoming upset about Madison not appearing to care about her decision to stick with the group. Madison shuts off the lights, but not before Travis, now alone, sees them. The next morning, survivors who had seen the hotel's lights come on begin to flock to the hotel gates, but the hotel survivors refuse to let them enter.

Madison spots Travis among the crowd and lets him inside. She then talks with Alicia and reveals to her that her father's car crash was a suicide and reiterates her love for her. Afterwards, Madison sees that the other survivor group have been allowed into the hotel compound and are checked to see if they are healthy or sick. Later that night, a new group of survivors arrives at the hotel, among them the two tourists. At the hotel, the tourists are let in, and Madison recognizes them based on Travis' description.

The tourists anger the rest of the refugees and are about to be thrown out of the hotel when Travis stops them and asks what happened to Chris. The tourists explain that Chris accidentally crashed their truck and was killed by the impact. However, an inconsistency in their stories lead Travis to conclude that Chris was only injured in the crash and was killed by the tourists. Enraged, Travis beats the tourists to death and severely injures Oscar who tries to stop him. Strand warns Madison that Travis must be exiled in order to maintain the unity of the hotel survivors. Madison is reluctant to have Travis exiled but ultimately agrees to go with him the next morning while Strand refuses to have anything to do with it. Oscar dies from his head injury. Enraged, several of the hotel survivors break into Travis' room and attack him, forcing Alicia to kill one of them to save his life.

Travis, Madison, and Alicia are forced to flee the hotel while Strand decides to stay behind after intervening to help them escape. They return to the bandits' supermarket and find the entire building abandoned, and Alicia questions Madison's motives when she starts searching the bodies of Francisco and his family for clues to find Nick. They arrive at the community and find that Marco and his men have been killed by the infected.

=== Season 3 ===
Travis, Madison, and Alicia are captured by an armed group and taken to a military compound, where Travis is separated from them and taken to a basement, and Madison and Alicia are taken to an office.

Madison and Alicia attack Troy, impaling one of his eyes with a spoon and taking him hostage, and Madison demands her family released. The family is reunited but the compound is overrun with walkers. Travis, Luciana and Alicia escape aboard a helicopter while Madison and Nick leave in a truck with Troy.

The next morning Madison and Nick arrive at Broke Jaw Ranch, which is run by Jeremiah Otto, Jake and Troy's father. They learn that the helicopter carrying Travis, Alicia, Luciana, Jake, and Charlie never arrived at the ranch, causing Troy to order Madison and Nick off the truck while they wait outside the gates of the ranch while Troy goes looking for them. Nick wants to leave the ranch because of Troy's actions back at the compound, but is convinced by Madison to wait. Madison is greeted by Jeremiah who gives Madison coffee and asks if Travis could have hijacked the helicopter, implying his actions were based on his race, leading Madison to say he would protect her daughter at all costs.

Alicia returns with Jake and Luciana and discovers that Travis was killed during their flight to the farm. In that moment, Nick pulls a gun on Troy for wanting to execute Luciana and refusing to give her medical attention; he eventually gives the gun to Jeremiah. Later that evening, Madison is mourning Travis' death when Jeremiah approaches her to sign a checkout book for weapons; she signs and they have a brief conversation. That night at their bunker, Madison is with her children, but Nick wants to leave due to Troy's actions at the compound. Madison refuses and declares they stay because Travis died getting here and she is tired of running; if the Ottos cannot run the ranch, they will take it. She asks Alicia how Travis died. The news upsets Madison, and makes her join Troy's militia in search of the plane wreckage and discover who shot the helicopter. Madison, Troy, and the group discover that the Native Americans shot down the helicopter when it flew over their lands and the Native leader, Qaletaqa Walker, says he will attack the ranch if the Ottos and the survivors do not leave the ranch, as the land belongs to them.

After some clashes between the two communities, Madison suggests that Jeremiah kill himself so that Qaletaga can get revenge, as he had killed Qaletaga's family in his youth. Jeremiah refuses to commit suicide, and Nick shoots him in the head; Madison stages it as a suicide for Troy and Jake. The next morning, Madison hands Jeremiah's head over to Walker, putting a truce on the war. The natives move to the Ottos' ranch to be on the safe side. Troy does not accept the coexistence of the natives on the farm, and Madison fails to keep the peace between the two sides.

After Troy tries to kill Qaletaga, his brother exiles him from the farm, and he plots revenge. Later, the ranch enters a time of water scarcity that makes Madison and Qaletaga head to El Bazar, a commercial point in the city of Mexicali. The two offer gold coins to the merchant Maria Lu in exchange for a tanker truck. However, Madison and Qaletaga find Strand in her place and the man decides to help them by offering a deal with Lola Guerrero, the new leader of the dam after Dante's death. The trio travel to Gonzales Dam and meets Daniel, who Madison tells that Ofelia is alive.

Madison convinces Lola to create an exchange system between the communities: water for livestock, plantations, etc. With a tanker truck, Madison returns to the ranch with the promise of taking Ofelia to Daniel. The ranch is attacked by thousands of infected who are attracted to Troy. Many die, including Jake, except for Nick, Alicia, Ofelia, Lee, and Troy. Alicia separates from the group and decides to survive alone for a while; she ends up meeting Los Procuradores, a gang from Mexicali that intends to attack the dam.

Madison and her group go with Daniel, and he is devastated to learn that his daughter was bitten and died shortly after. Daniel decides to take Madison and the group to the prey, but she is attacked by the Proctors. Troy is killed by Madison when she learns that he lured the infected to the ranch. Madison is separated from Alicia and Nick when the dam explodes and everyone is carried away by the current.

=== Season 4 ===
The fourth season has a two-year time jump from the previous season to coincide with Morgan Jones's crossover from The Walking Dead. Madison is only seen through flashbacks. She first appears in the second episode "Another Day in the Diamond" living in a baseball stadium where she, Nick, Alicia, Strand, and Luciana have lived for a year after the explosion of the dam. In the mid-season finale, Madison seemingly sacrifices herself in an explosion in order to let Alicia and the rest of her group escape the stadium prior to the start of season 4.

=== Season 7 ===
Madison returns in the season finale, having survived the stadium fire shown in the fourth season, although how she escaped remains unexplained. As Morgan is nearly buried alive by a group of bandits under the assumption that he kidnapped their children, the group is shot dead by an oncoming attacker, who is revealed to be Madison. She is carrying an oxygen tank due to damages sustained from smoke inhalation. Morgan thanks her for saving him, not knowing who she is. She then holds him at gunpoint as she leaves with Mo, Morgan's adopted daughter, claiming that Mo will be better off without him. Morgan eventually catches up to Madison and, after a brief skirmish, notices her children's names tattooed on her wrists. Realizing who she is, he decides to keep the fate of her children secret until he reunites with Mo, whom Madison has given away to a community called PADRE. It is discovered that Mo is not the first child she has relocated, and that she has been kidnapping and giving children to PADRE under the promise that they would assist her in finding Nick and Alicia. However, over time, she became discouraged from wanting to reunite with her children due to her work for PADRE. Morgan later reveals the fate of her children, and Madison grieves them but decides she will not look for Alicia, who may still be alive. She chooses to help Morgan get Mo back from PADRE after he rescues Madison from a revenge-seeking posse whose children she had kidnapped. Madison and Morgan are transported to PADRE blindfolded, earning their ticket in with the promise of information on a pregnant survivor, but Madison admits that she doesn't actually know where PADRE is.

=== Season 8 ===
Seven years after helping Morgan to rescue Mo, Madison is a prisoner of PADRE and has become suicidal. However, Madison stages an escape when she realizes that the young girl "Wren" is actually Mo. This sets her at odds with Morgan who has become a Collector for PADRE and desires to keep Mo in their care. The trio are narrowly rescued from a herd of walkers in a swamp by Grace, but Mo's parents alert PADRE who take her back to the island and take Morgan and Madison into custody. After Morgan admits that something in his past is keeping him from being the father that Mo needs, Madison helps him to escape, prompting Morgan to return to King County and at last face the loss of his family.

Shrike, one of the leaders of PADRE, then attempts to have Madison experimented upon by June, who Madison knew as Naomi, believing that Alicia's resistance to the walker bite infection might be partially genetic and shared by her mother. However, Mo instigates a fight, leading to Madison and June's escape and Shrike's capture. Madison is reunited with Daniel Salazar for the first time since the destruction of the Gonzalez Dam, learning that he now leads a resistance army of parents seeking to rescue their children from PADRE. Madison convinces the Prefect named Dove to help them in the hopes of finding answers about her family and forces Shrike to reveal that the organization's mysterious leader is actually her and her brother Ben who took over following the death of all of the adults twelve years before. Dove turns out to be Odessa Sanderson, a child who was kidnapped by Madison and whose mother perished in Louisiana soon after Madison and Morgan met for the first time. With Daniel's forces unwilling to follow Madison, who had kidnapped many of their children personally, she advocates finding Morgan. When PADRE unleashes the horde from their shipyard in order to get at the supplies inside, Madison helps Morgan despite his insistence that she stay away due to Morgan slipping in and out of his state of insanity following Grace's death and Mo's return to PADRE. Madison helps Morgan to see that those you lose are never really gone and he finally breaks the cycle of losing people and losing himself. In a confrontation with the two, Shrike is bitten by her zombified father before Madison puts him down and retrieves the coordinates that PADRE needs from his corpse. Madison, Morgan and Daniel subsequently convince the Prefects to stand down and banish Ben from the island. Morgan decides to return to Alexandria with Mo, leaving his friends in Madison's hands. Now in charge of PADRE, Madison decides to reform it into what PADRE was always supposed to be while trying to find the parents of the kidnapped children.

Madison is subsequently hunted by a hostile group, reuniting with Victor Strand in the process. The group turns out to be led by Troy Otto who was supposedly killed by Madison years before. Before Madison escapes, Troy claims to have killed Alicia and left her to wander around as a walker, providing Madison with Alicia's unique prosthetic arm as proof. As a result, Madison's behavior becomes increasingly more volatile and unhinged as she seeks revenge upon Troy. Madison is reunited with Charlie and Luciana while searching for fuel, only to learn that Charlie was the one who had killed Nick. Madison spitefully sends Charlie on a suicide mission to assassinate Troy, but finally relents and forgives her after discovering that Charlie had Nick's body recovered and cremated, leaving his ashes for his mother. However, Charlie is captured by Troy and ultimately commits suicide, sacrificing herself to remove Troy's leverage over PADRE. Despite their differences, Madison briefly helps Troy as he desperately searches for a lost child in the midst of a walker attack, learning that the girl is actually Troy's own daughter Tracy. Troy reveals that he blames Madison for the loss of his wife Serena, although Madison has no idea what he's talking about. The incident causes a rift between Madison, Daniel and Luciana and she decides to leave PADRE in Strand's hands, relinquishing her leadership of it for good.

After Strand goes rogue and kidnaps Tracy, he takes her to Madison for help. Tracy agrees to lead Madison to where she claims Alicia is located in a herd trapped in a swamp, but it turns out to be an attempt by Tracy to get Madison killed by a zombified Serena. Much like her father, Tracy blames Madison and Alicia for her mother's death even though Madison doesn't recognize the woman. Tracy eventually claims that Alicia was killed in a mansion near Fort Worth, but Madison tries to kill her anyways before Strand arrives to dissuade her along with a group of women who had been helped by Alicia over the years. Realizing that Troy intends to attack the island with an army of the dead like he did Broke Jaw Ranch, Madison steals the SWAT van to go after Troy alone.

Madison's search for Troy causes her to encounter Tracy again who seeks Madison's help after Troy was injured and trapped in a car crash. After a brief scuffle in which Troy tries to have Madison killed by Serena, they reach a deal where Troy will lead Madison to his herd so that she can stop it if Madison will allow Troy to bury his wife and talk to Tracy about something. Having set aside his differences with Madison for the time being, Troy explains that his wife was someone who Alicia had saved after Serena was bit, even with her and Troy's bad history. Alicia had inspired Serena to help people in trouble which had led to Serena's death when a survivor that she was trying to help had robbed and murdered her instead. As a result, the grief-stricken Troy had blamed Alicia and Madison by extension due to Serena dying while following what Alicia had learned from Madison. The two are attacked by a vengeful Ben Krennick and trapped in quicksand. Ben reveals that Madison had survived the events at the stadium by taking shelter in the water tank of the stadium's irrigation truck - parked close to the gate by Douglas near the start of the attack - and Ben and Shrike had found and rescued her after hearing Madison's last message to her kids, believing that she was someone that they could manipulate to do their bidding by using her kids against her. Madison manages to draw in nearby walkers who devour Ben while Troy unexpectedly saves her life.

Remorseful for his actions, Troy helps Madison stop the herd. However, believing that Alicia giving Troy another chance had gotten her daughter killed, Madison kills Troy by fatally impaling him on Alicia's prosthetic arm rather than making peace with him. The dying Troy implores Madison to take care of Tracy, claiming that she's actually Alicia's daughter whom he had kidnapped. Disillusioned with her previous beliefs and now convinced that helping people only gets those you love killed, Madison attempts to take Tracy and find Alicia, particularly after Troy's second-in-command Russell reveals that Alicia may still be alive, even refusing to help as PADRE is overrun. However, Tracy shoots Madison, apparently killing her, and takes off. After Tracy shoots and buries the zombified Troy, she's found by Strand who reveals that the bullet was blocked by Alicia's St. Christopher's medallion. Convinced that she needed to do something monumental to restore Tracy's belief in people, Madison had saved everyone on the island by luring the herd inside of the fort and blowing it up, seemingly sacrificing herself just like she did at the stadium. Madison's devastated friends rename PADRE to MADRE in honor of Madison's sacrifice and subsequently split up to use MADRE's resources to build new communities and honor Madison's ideals of building something better.

Unbeknownst to everyone else, Madison survives the explosion after having locked herself in her old cell with the oxygen tank that Madison is forced to occasionally use keeping her from suffocating. Tracy is able to dig Madison out of the rubble and they are reunited with a still alive Alicia who had come to check out what had happened after hearing the story of Madison's sacrifice. Alicia reveals that Troy had lied about her being Tracy's mother which they conclude was so that Madison would fight as hard for her as she did for her own kids. Observing their friends from a distance, Madison and Alicia choose to let the others continue believing that they're dead aside from Strand who they discreetly reveal their survival to. Madison decides to return to Los Angeles with Alicia and Tracy to help the survivors there rebuild their destroyed home city.

== Development and reception ==
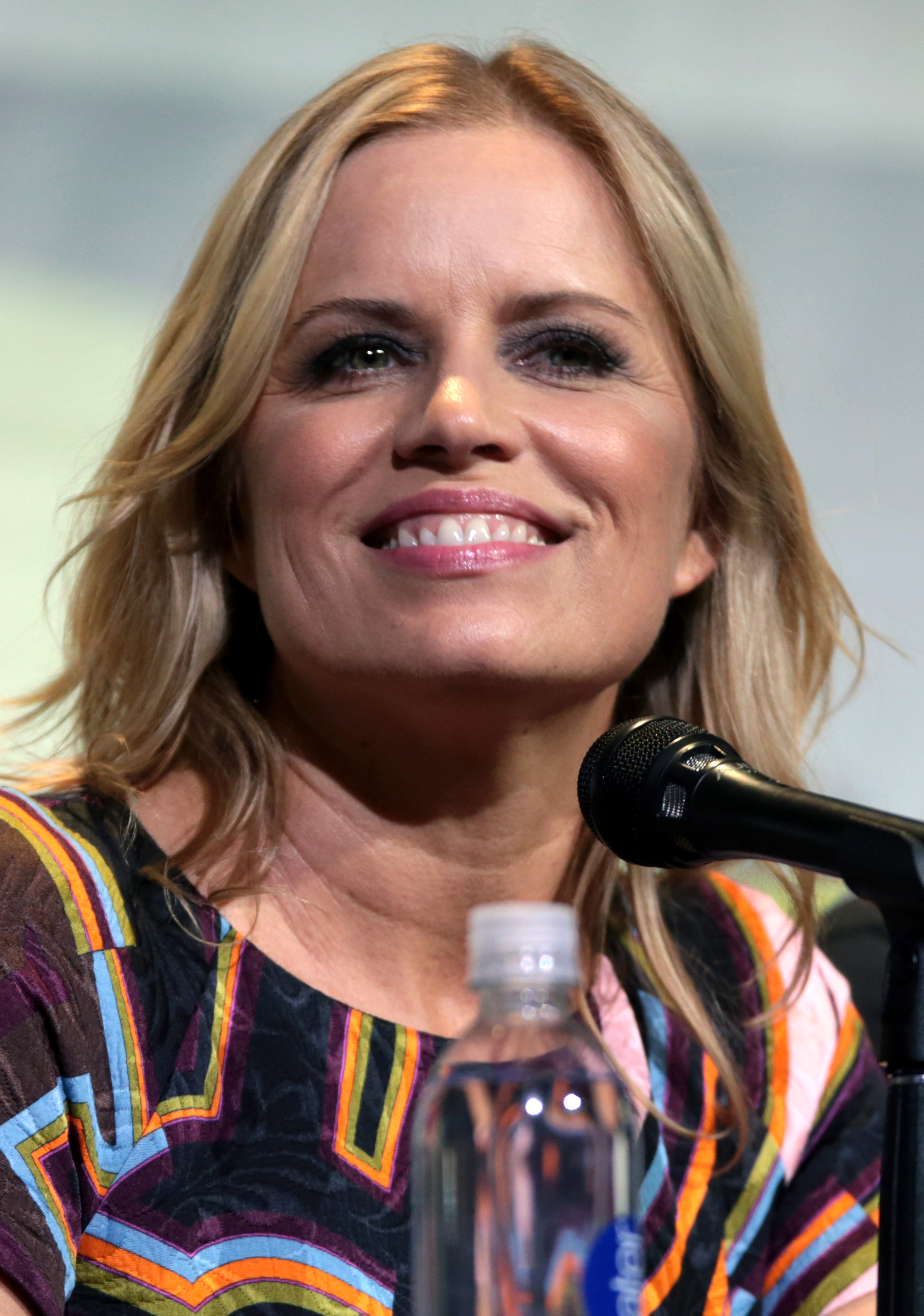
Madison Clark is portrayed by Kim Dickens (pictured)

Madison Clark is portrayed by Kim Dickens. In season 4's mid-season finale, it looks likes Madison Clark is killed. Years later, in season 7, it became known after years that she is still alive.

At that time Dickens commented on her character's "death", saying:

"You know, when I went in and met with the showrunners and the producer and they told me the changes they saw and the arc they wanted to play out and that the first half of the season would end with Madison's demise, it was written. It's ultimately up to the producers and the writers. It was a shock and a huge disappointment to me. But it was already laid out. I felt like Madison had more stories to tell and more roads to travel. She could have gone in crazy directions. She could have become a villain. I was ready to do anything to go further and deeper with her. So was I satisfied with the story? I thought her demise was a beautiful sacrificial moment, but I would have envisioned a different death. I thought the episode in that moment was beautiful. I did. But it surprised me that that's the way it happened."

Dickens received praise for her performance, but her character received mixed reviews among fans and critics, due to the uncertainty of whether she or Travis were the protagonist of the series.

In his season review for IGN, Matt Fowler gave the third season an 8.2 out of 10 rating; praising Kim Dickens' character Madison, he wrote, "Fear the Walking Dead more solidly found its tone and voice this season by embracing the arid landscape, ramping up the human-on-human conflict, and rallying around Kim Dickens' anti-hero mom, Madison, as the driving character" and that it is now "a better series overall than The Walking Dead."

The decision to let Madison leave the show received intense criticism and is widely regarded as the reason the show plummeted in viewership, despite the season receiving positive reviews. Some fans demanded Dickens' return as Madison at a later point in the series, as her death was never actually shown, which was unusual for a lead character in the series.

In a Talking Dead episode that aired on December 5, 2021, Kim Dickens made a surprise guest appearance to reveal that Madison is in fact still alive and that she will be returning in the show's seventh season.
