= Children of Wrath (Fear the Walking Dead) =

- Fear the Walking Dead episode
- Episode no.: Season 3 Episode 8
- Directed by: Andrew Bernstein
- Written by: Jami O'Brien
- Original air date: July 9, 2017
- Running time: 51 minutes

Guest appearances
- Michael Greyeyes as Qaletaqa Walker; Michael William Freeman as Blake Sarno; Justin Rain as Lee

Episode chronology
← Previous "The Unveiling"	Next → "Minotaur"
- Fear the Walking Dead (season 3)

"Children of Wrath" is the eighth episode and mid-season finale of the third season of the post-apocalyptic horror television series Fear the Walking Dead, which aired on AMC on July 9, 2017 along with the previous episode "The Unveiling". This episode marks the last regular appearance of Dayton Callie (Jeremiah Otto) as he was killed by Nick Clark (Frank Dillane).

== Plot ==
=== Teaser ===
Through flashbacks, Ofelia is seen crossing the desert. As she walks along a border fence, she is shot at and she seeks shelter behind a tree. We see the barrel of a gun approaching which is revealed to be Jeremiah Otto. He gives her water once he realizes she’s American, only allowing her a few sips. Ofelia asks for refuge only to be denied by Jeremiah because “there’s no use for brown people there.” He denied Ofelia refuge for racist reasons. He instead gives her advice telling her to take shelter and “travel by starlight” as he leaves.

She is exhausted by heat, and delusional. As she removes her boots and jacket, she hallucinates, seeing her father Daniel. Daniel warns her the clothing and shoes will protect her from the sun, but she doesn’t put them back on, falling onto the sand, trying to dig a hole. Daniel warns her against that as well, growing more urgent as she says she needs to sleep. She mutters in Spanish, and passes out. Ofelia is later found by Walker on horseback. He takes her, still passed out and extremely sunburnt, back to the Nation’s land to recover.

=== Plot ===
Madison, Nick, and Alicia wake up to the sound of yelling at the ranch. The poison has killed and there are dead on site, causing havoc. Many are ill. Madison finds Ofelia, mid-escape, beats her and takes her to Black Hat. Walker reveals the poison was anthrax.

Ofelia later confronts Walker over making her a killer without her knowledge. The militia attack Black Hat and, at the cost of lives on both sides, Madison and Alicia steal Walker's trailer of sacred relics. Nick digs under the old cabin and learns Jeremiah and the founders killed three braves who were attacking their cattle, and Walker's father. Madison offers the reliquary and Walker's father's remains but Walker refuses peace.

Later Madison and Nick reveal to Alicia the lie they backed for Troy’s survival. Alicia is incensed at Troy's crimes, but moreso at her mother’s duplicity. After an explosive scene between Alicia and Madison, Madison reveals to her children her past, in Montgomery, Alabama. She, as a child, killed her abusive, corrupt, alcoholic councilman of a father, to protect her mother. The trio share a tense moment.

After, Madison confronts Jeremiah, saying she knows how to fix the mess that’s unfolded. Madison urges Jeremiah to kill himself, saying this will appease Walker, and preserve Jeremiah's legacy. He resists in his typical fashion, sitting down to lecture Madison. Nick enters, and as Jeremiah is making a comparison between Madison and himself, Nick shoots him in the forehead. Madison and Nick stage it as a suicide.

Madison secretly delivers Jeremiah's head to Walker.

Meanwhile, Strand finds the Abigail run aground; after clearing it of the dead border patrol, he pops a bottle of 1985 vintage Dom Perignon champagne. We later see him passed out against the radio, waking up to a strongly accented voice; we assume it is the International Space Station passing overhead. A Russian cosmonaut, Valery Vashchenko, shares an intimate moment with Strand. They share quotes from famous writers on their deathbeds. As the connection starts to break, he warns Victor not to wait to waste his chances since he’s not stranded for sure death like Valery. They lose the satellite connection.

Victor Strand sets fire to the Abigail, taking it in through his dark sunglasses. He leaves armed, with a pack of supplies, as the Abigail burns in the background.

== Reception ==
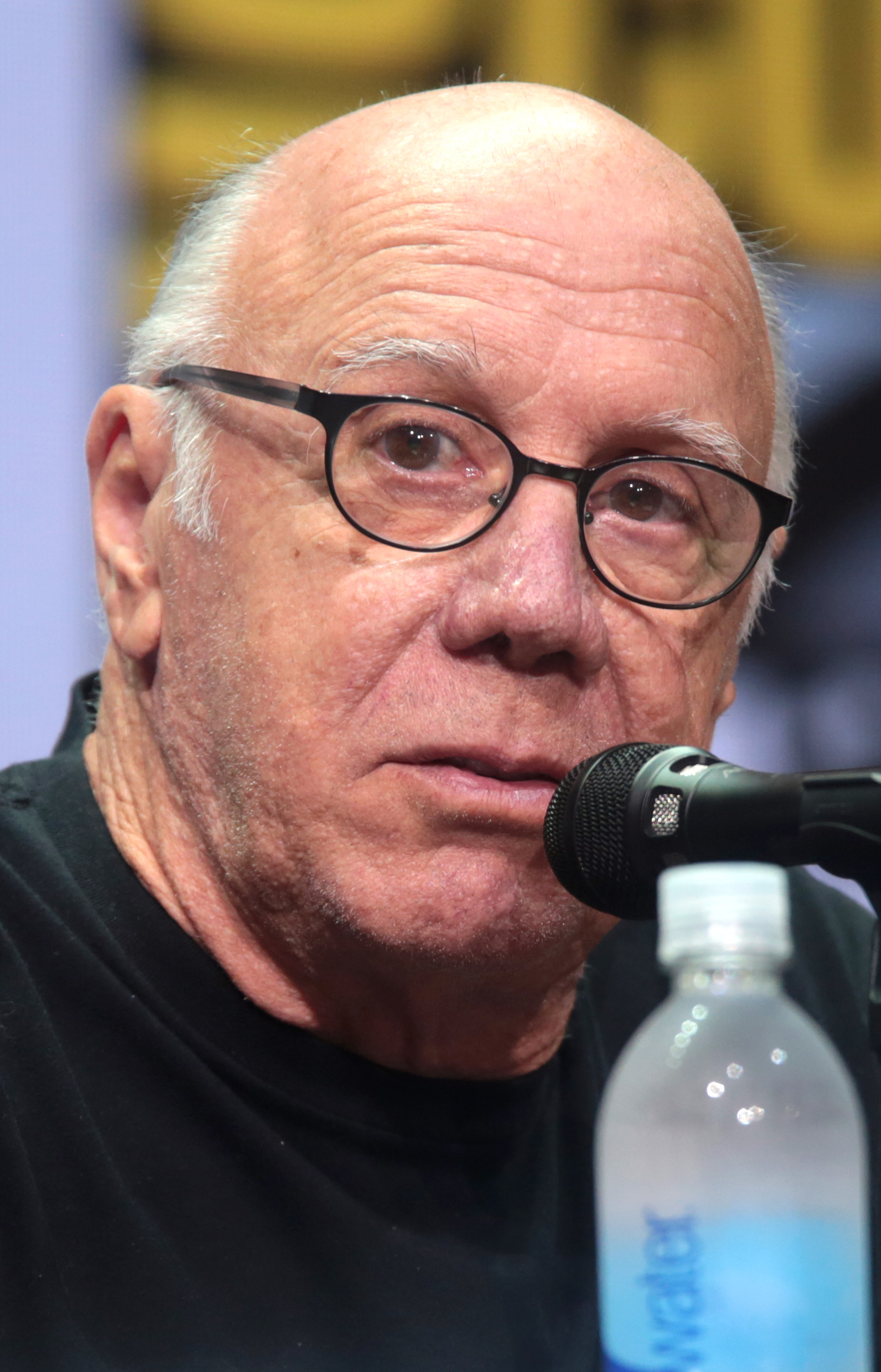
Dayton Callie made his final regular appearance as Jeremiah Otto in this episode

"Children of Wrath", along with the previous episode: "The Unveiling", received positive reviews from critics. On Rotten Tomatoes, "Children of Wrath" garnered a 75% rating, with an average score of 7.52/10 based on 8 reviews. In a joint review along with the previous episode "The Unveiling", Matt Fowler of IGN gave "Children of Wrath" an 8.6/10.0 rating, stating; "Fear the Walking Dead took us out of this half season with a tense and suspenseful one-two punch that brought back Ofelia while also resolving the calamitous conflict over the ranch in a meaningful manner."

=== Ratings ===
"Children of Wrath" was seen by 2.40 million viewers in the United States on its original air date, below the previous episodes rating of 2.62 million.
