= List of Fear the Walking Dead characters =

The following is a list of characters from Fear the Walking Dead, a television series that is a companion series and prequel to The Walking Dead, which is based on the comic book series of the same name.

== Cast ==
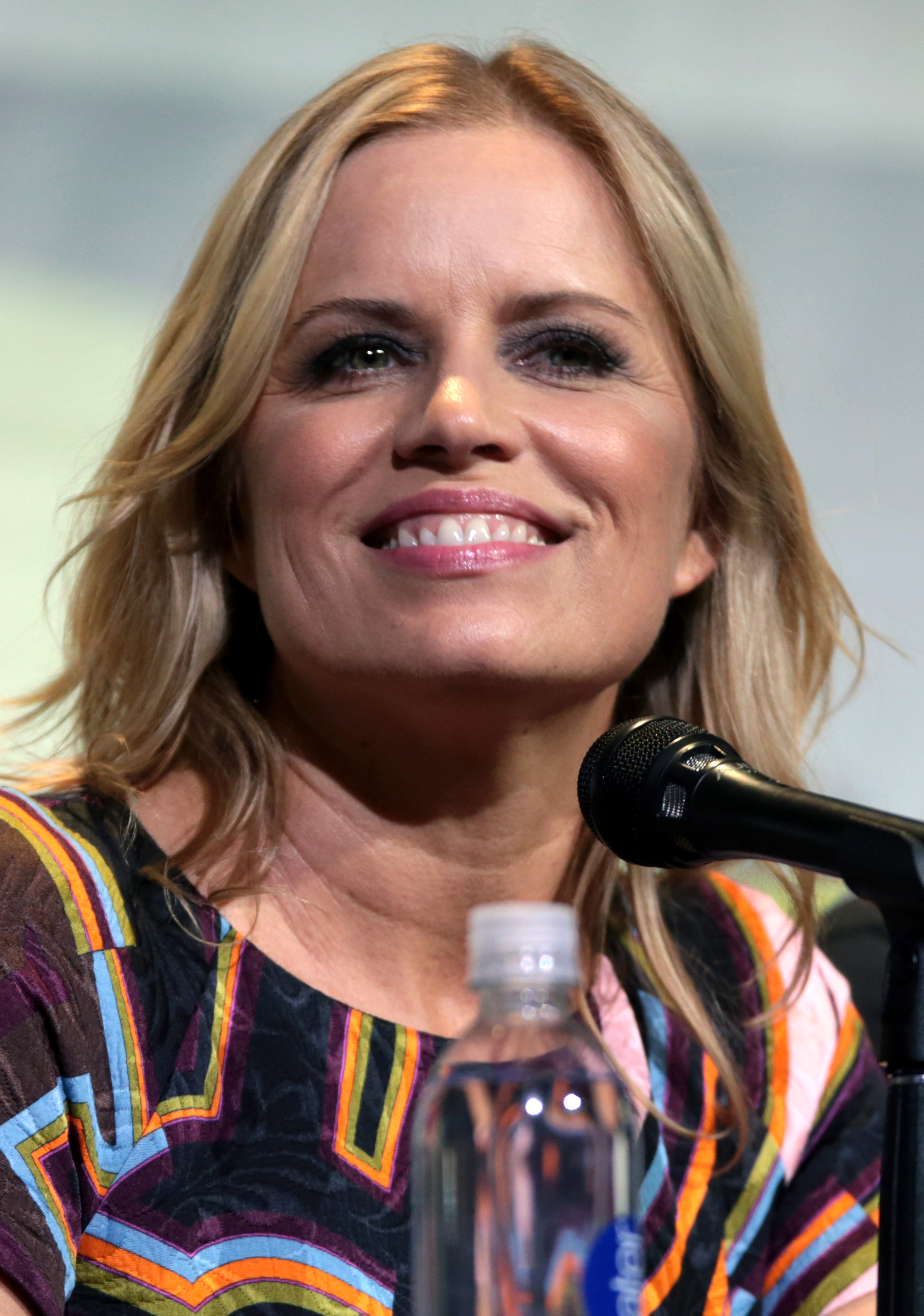
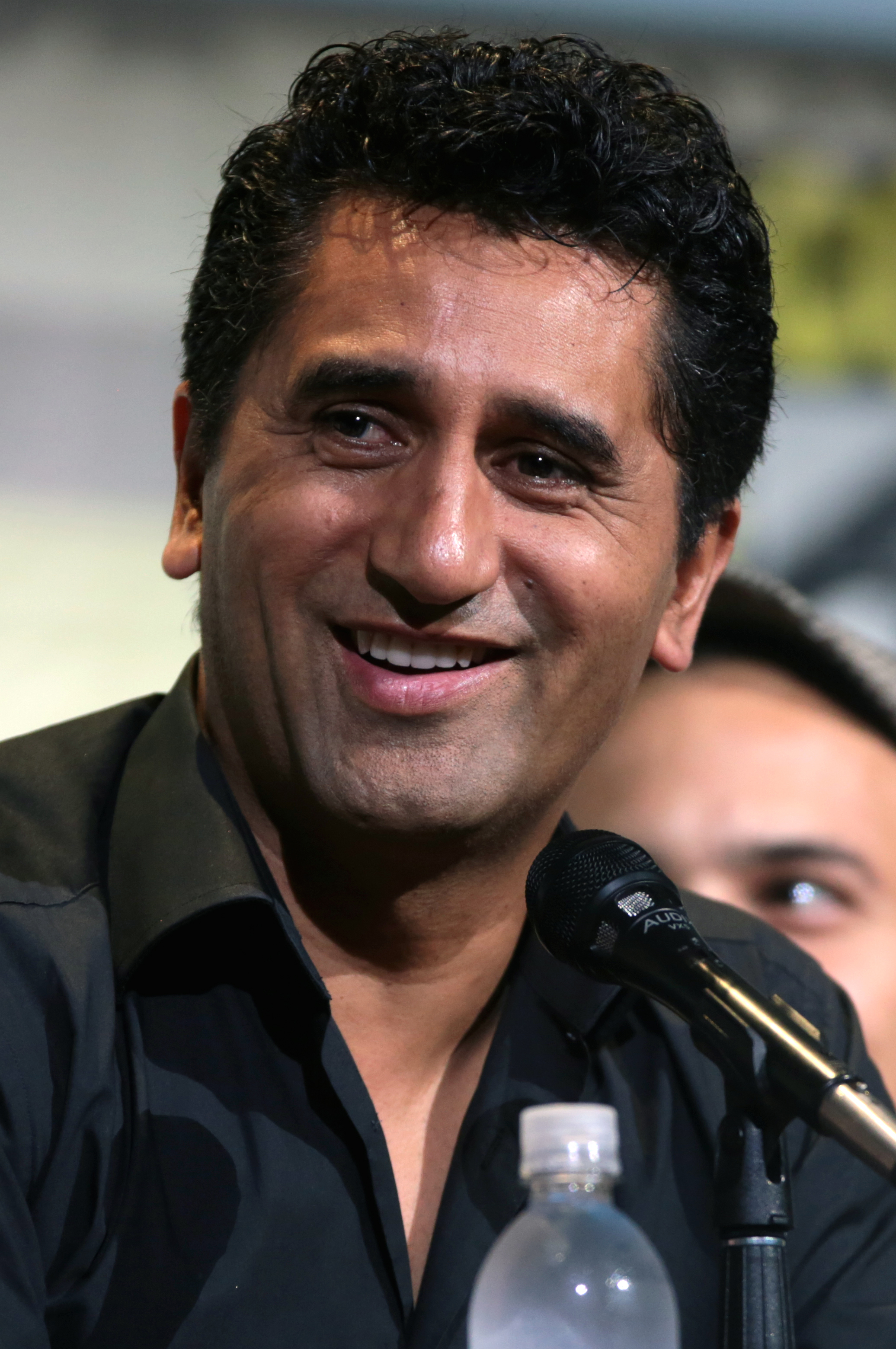
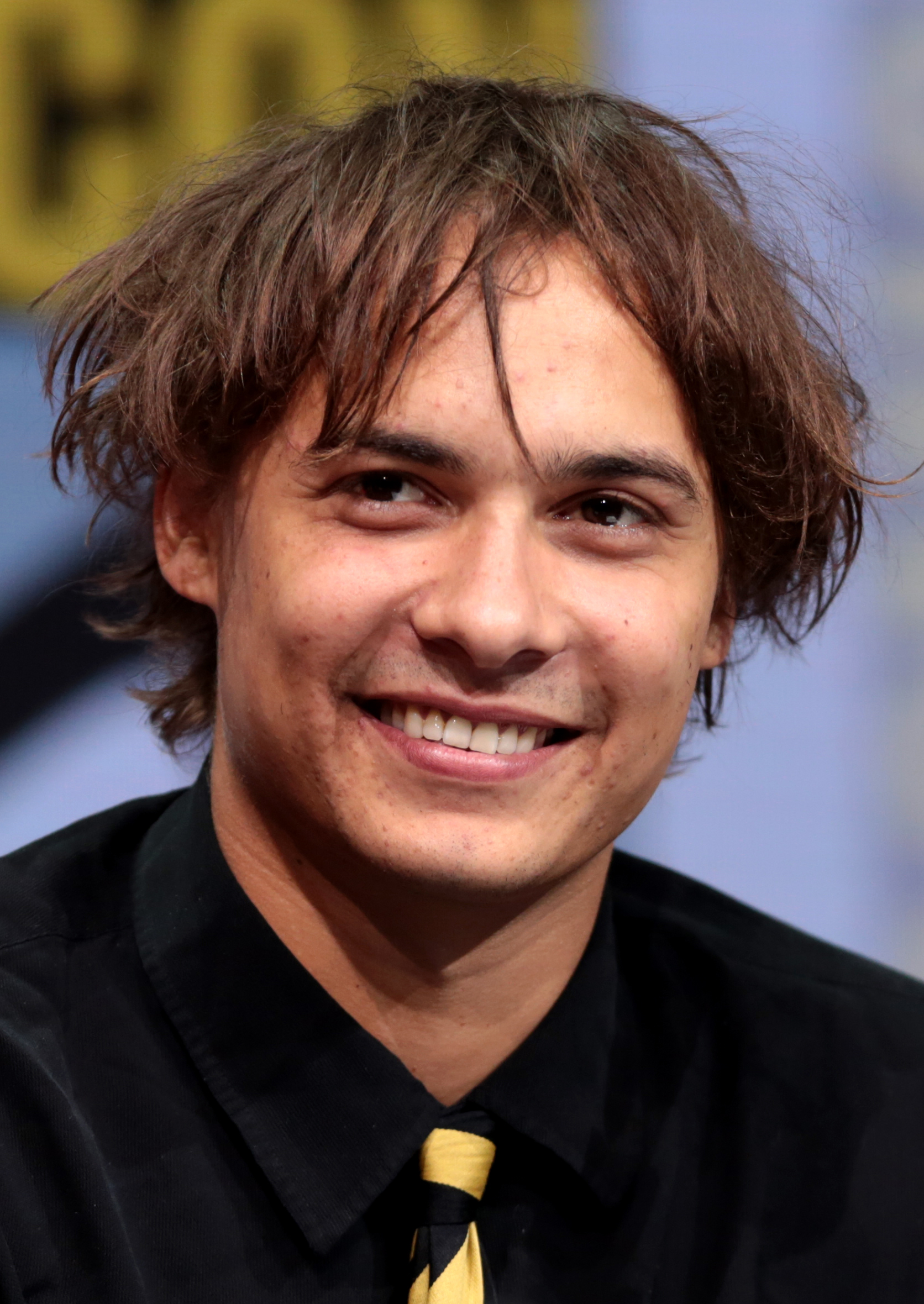
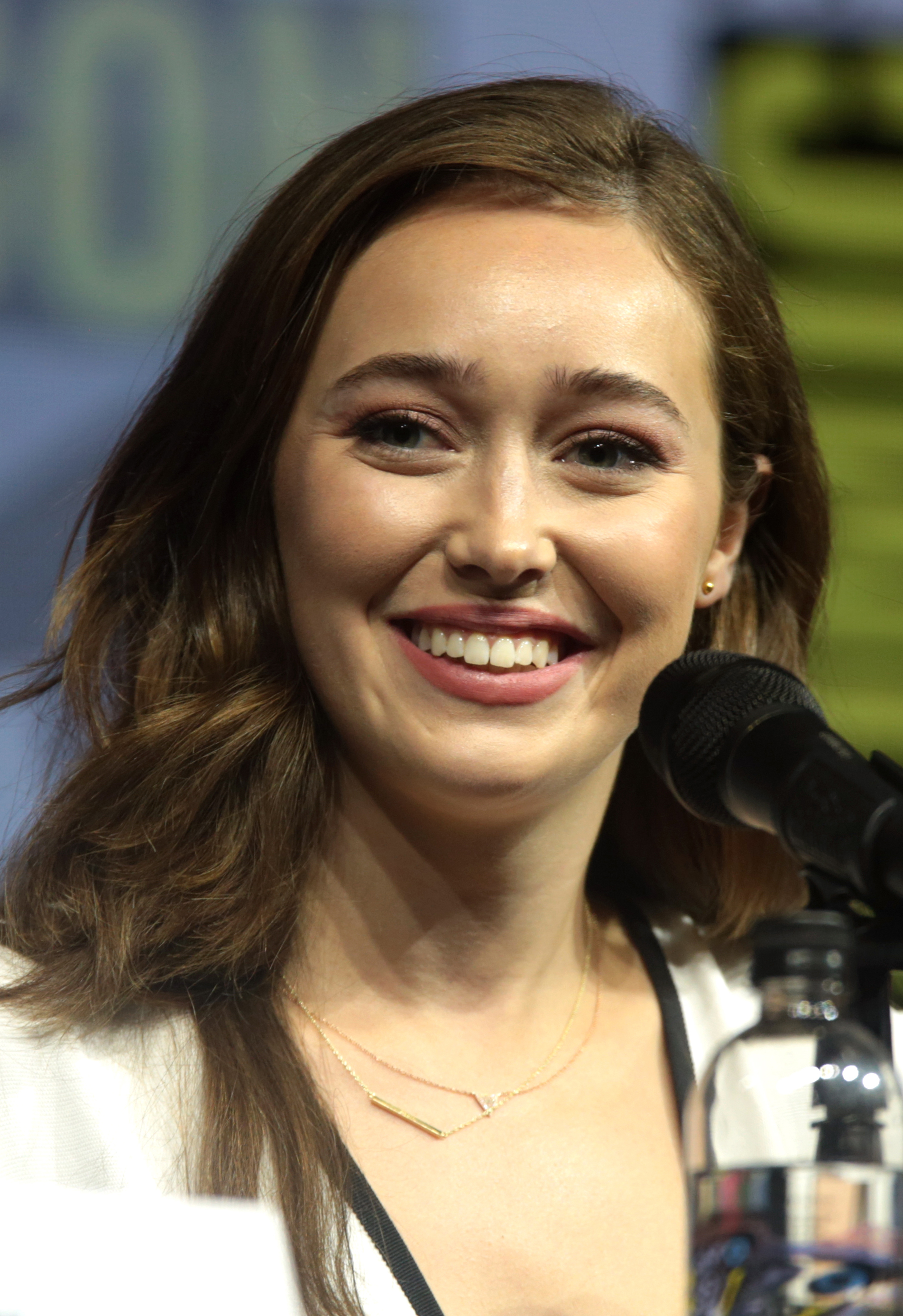
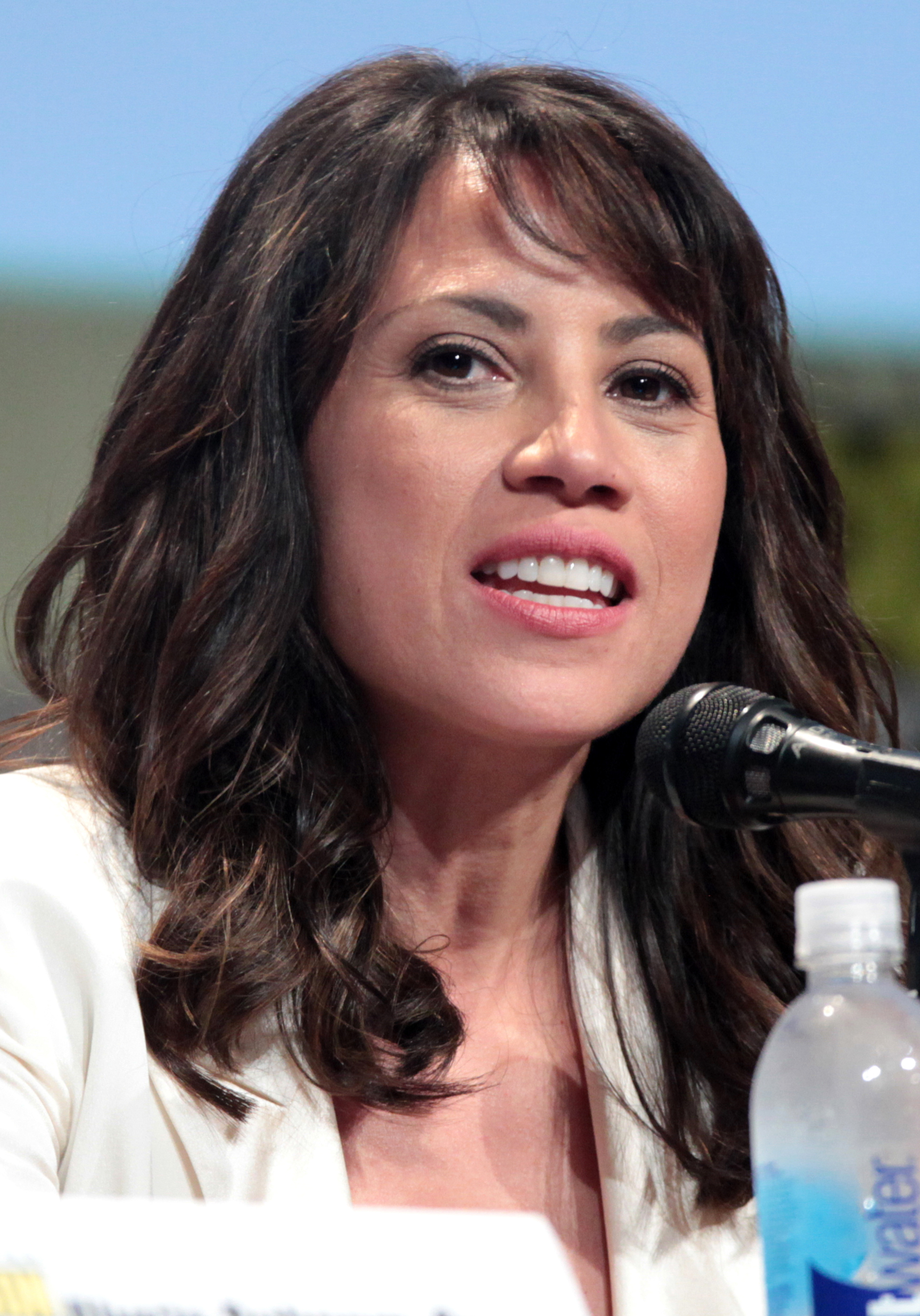
Kim Dickens (Madison Clark), Cliff Curtis (Travis Manawa), Frank Dillane (Nick Clark), Alycia Debnam-Carey (Alicia Clark), and Elizabeth Rodriguez (Liza Ortiz)
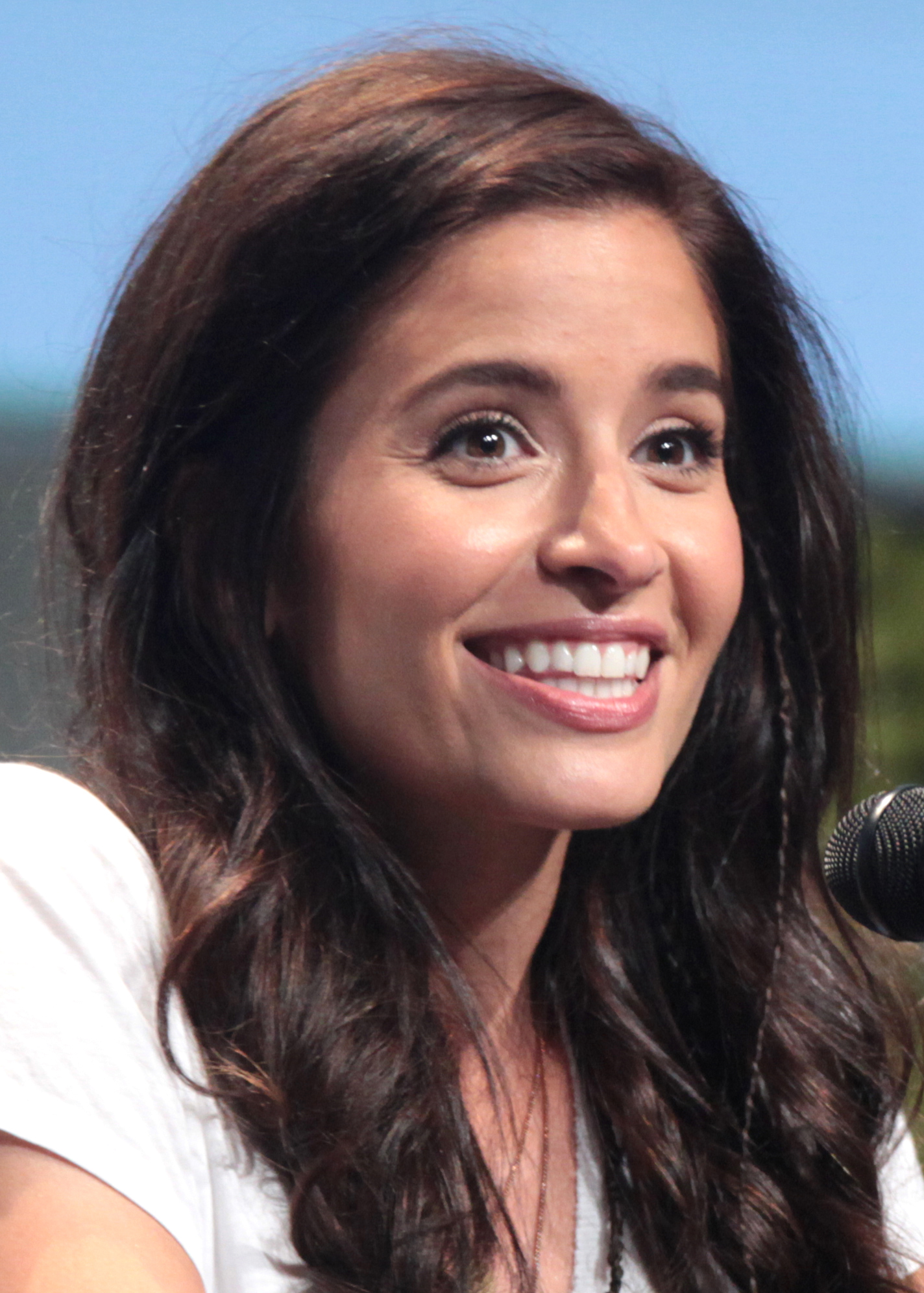
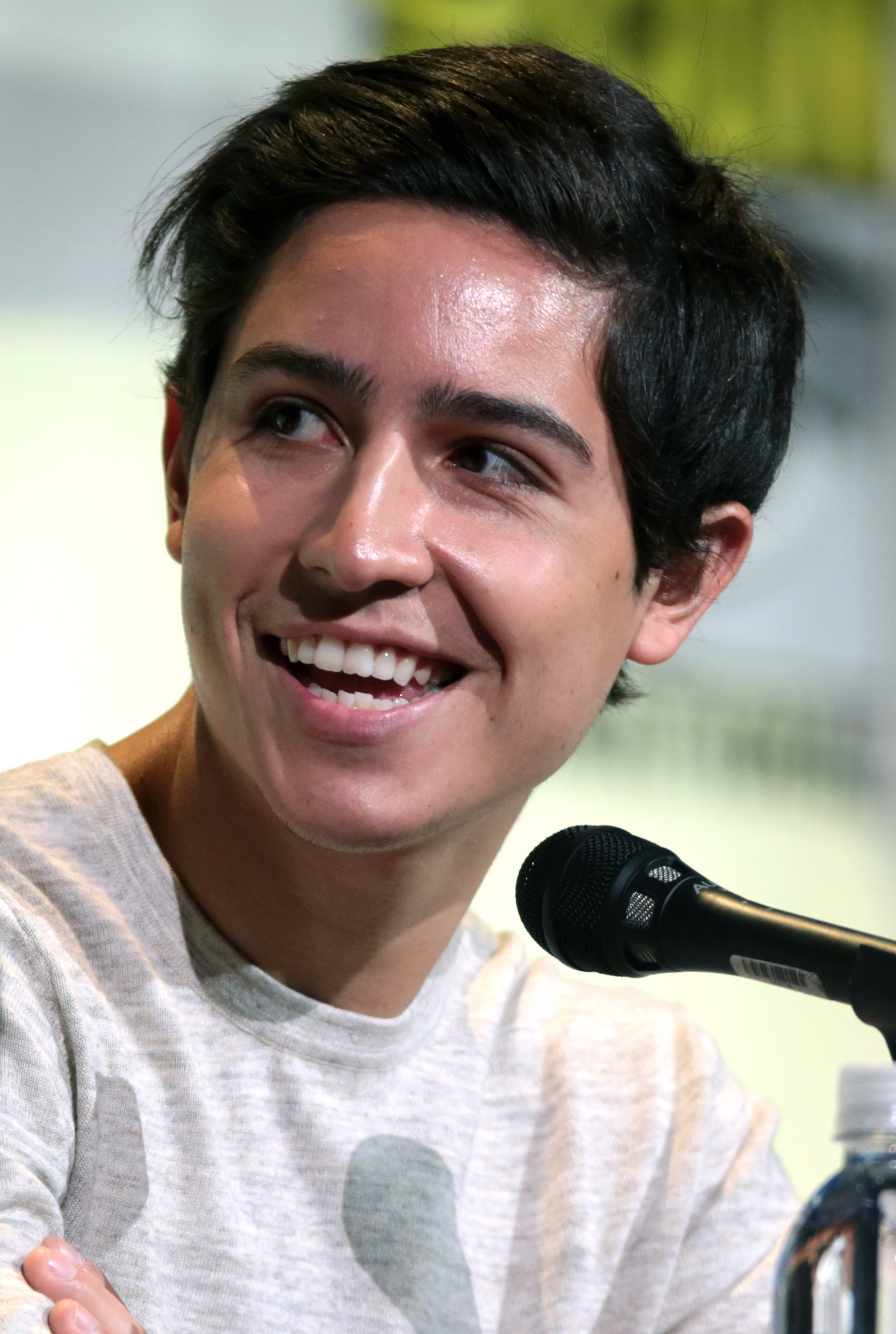
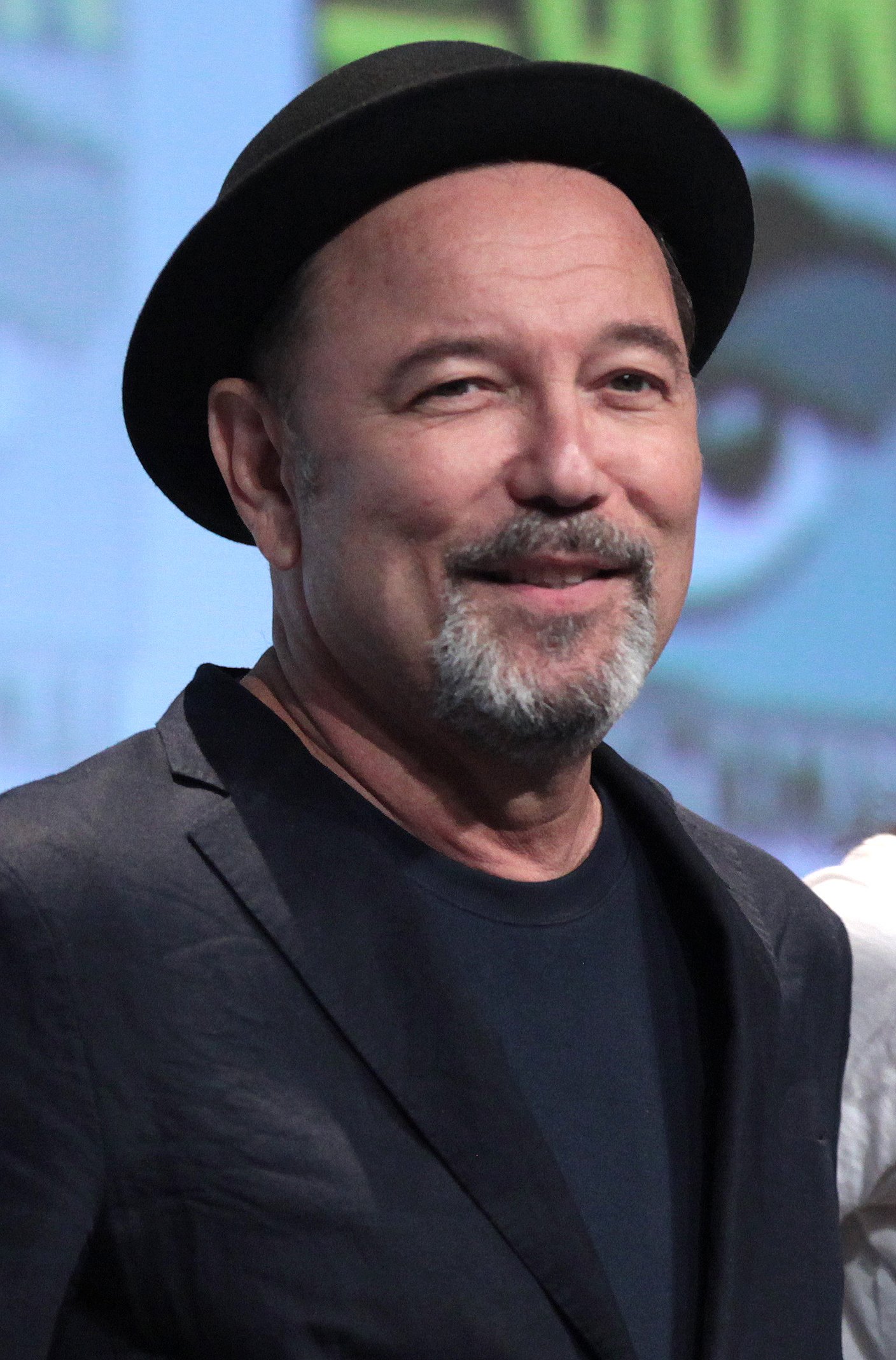
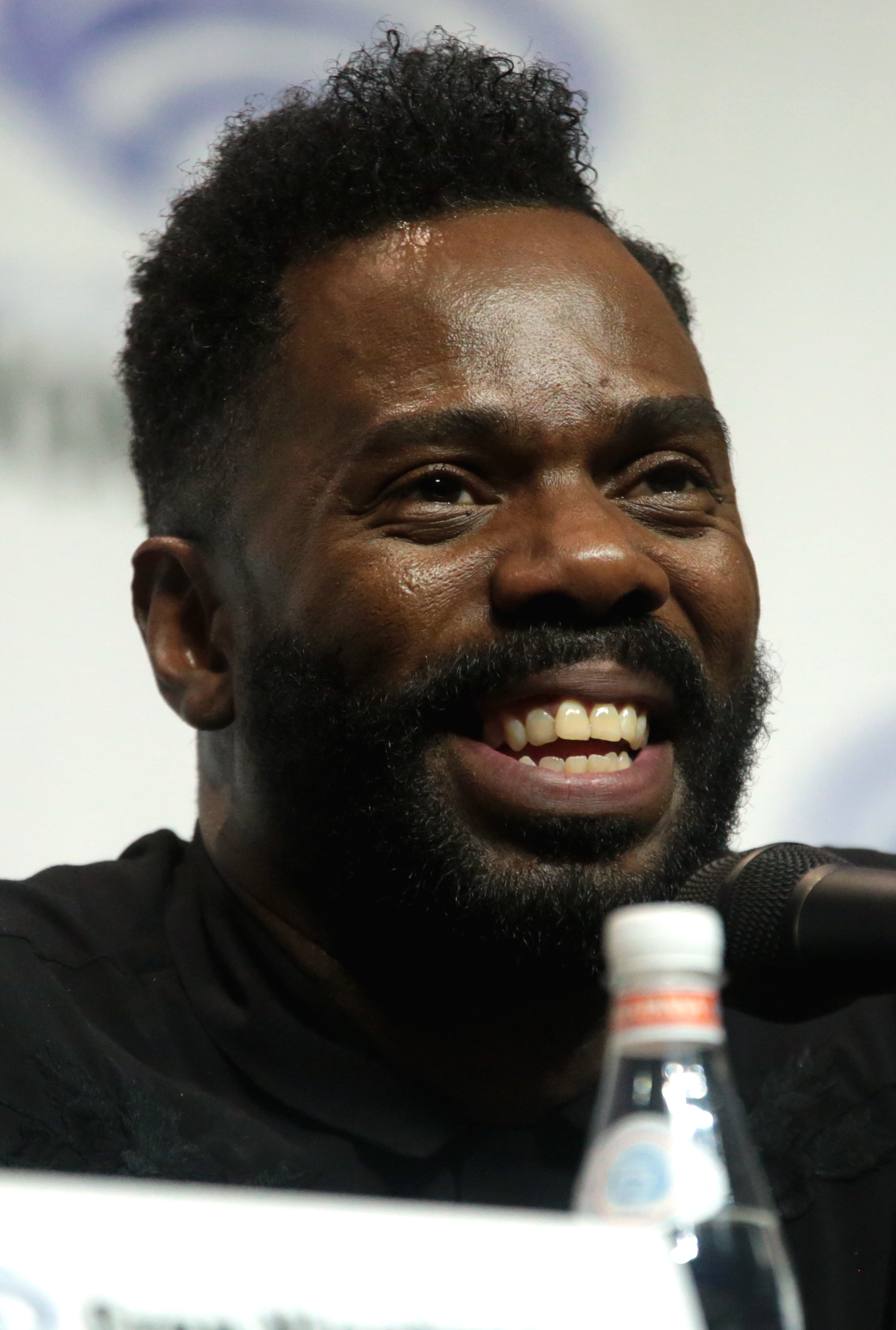
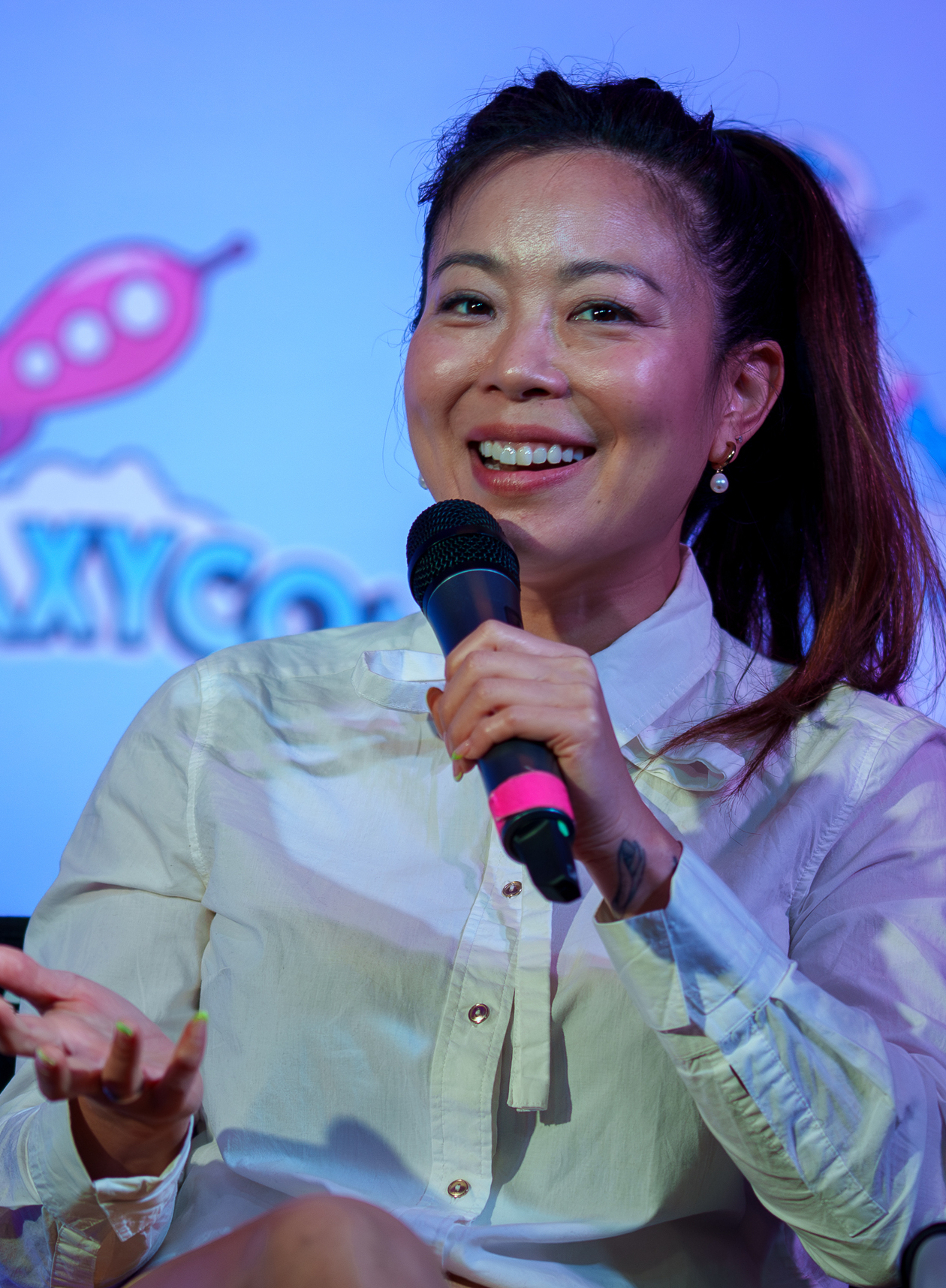
Mercedes Mason (Ofelia Salazar), Lorenzo James Henrie (Chris Manawa), Rubén Blades (Daniel Salazar), Colman Domingo (Victor Strand), and Michelle Ang (Alex)
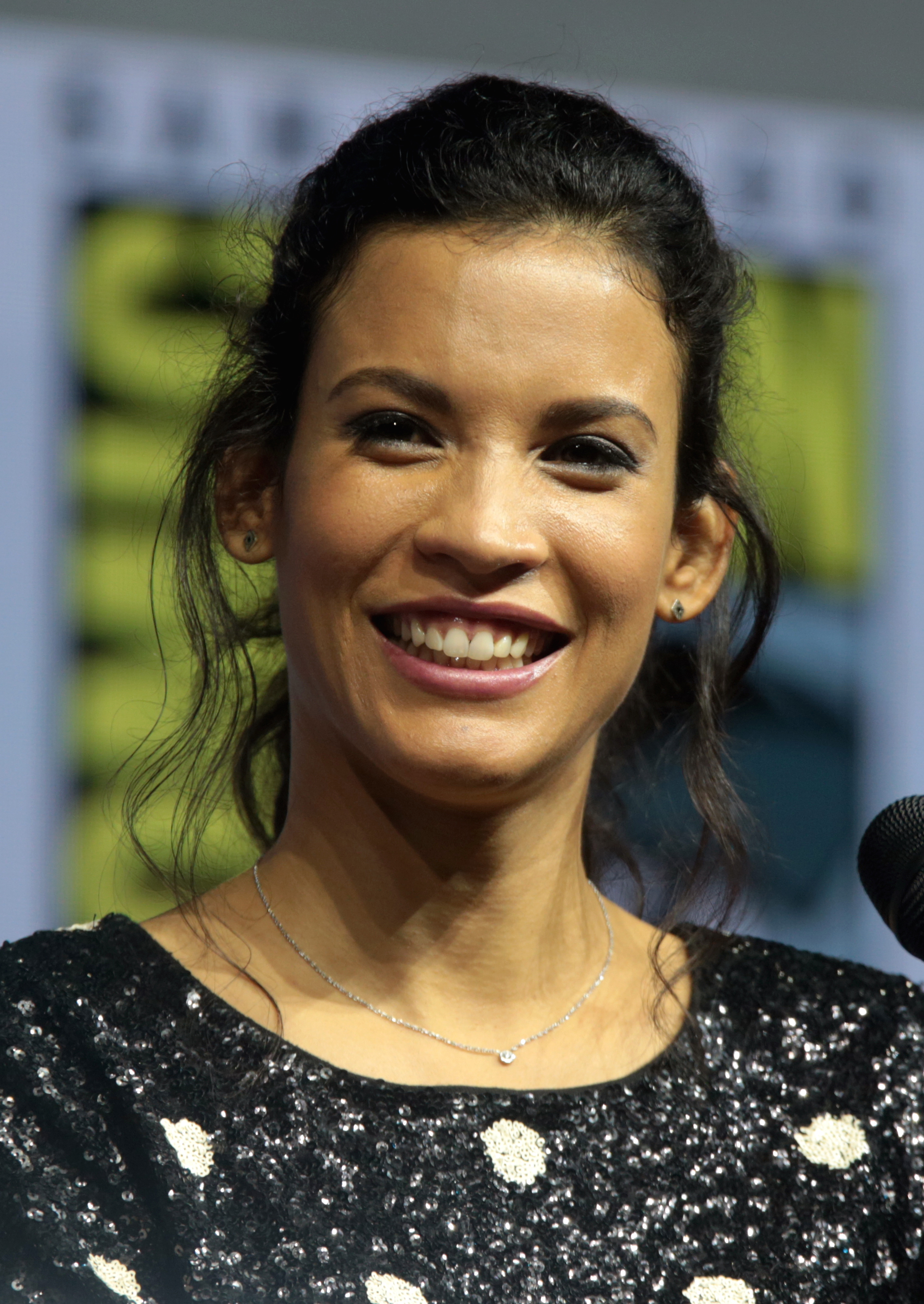
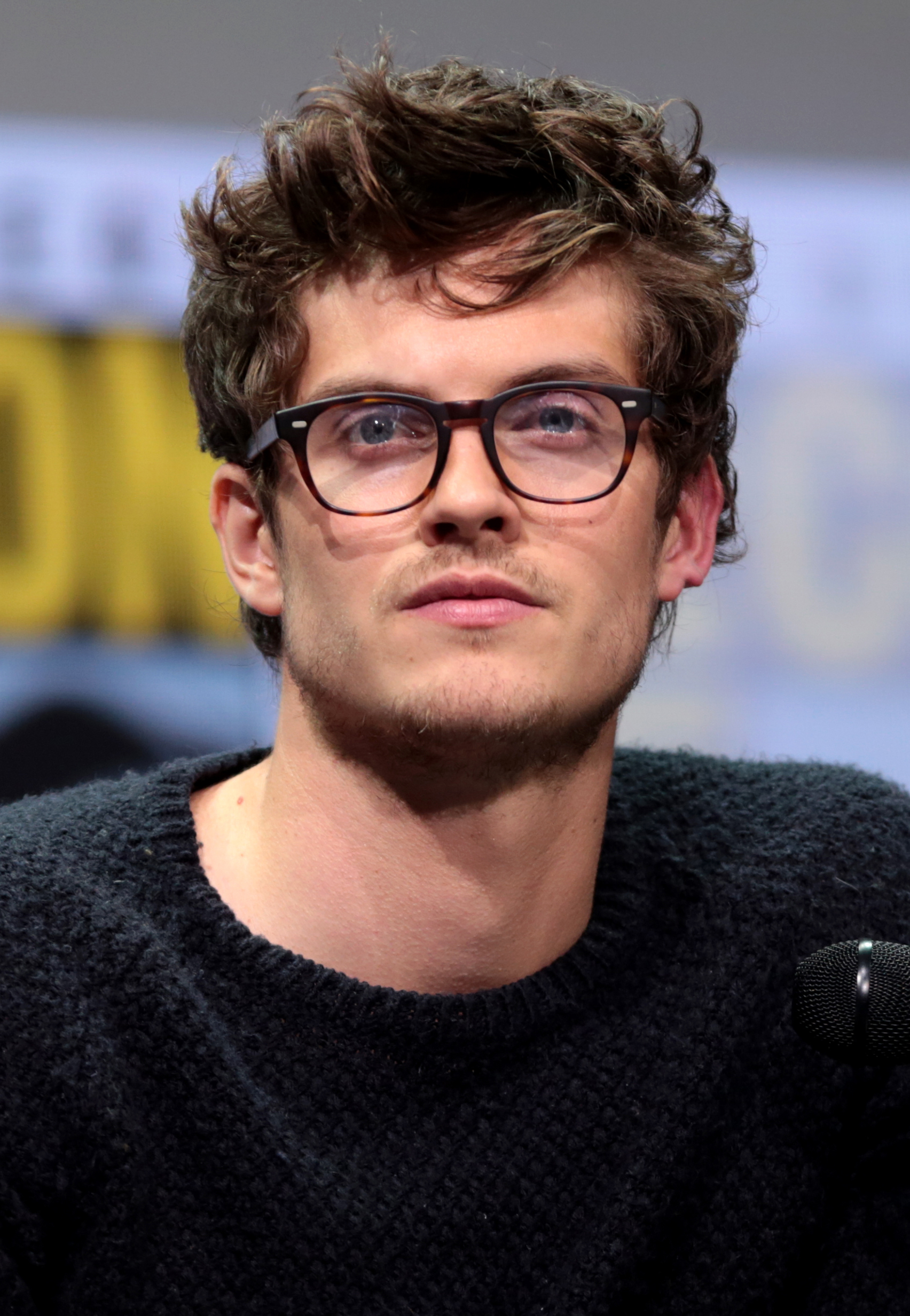
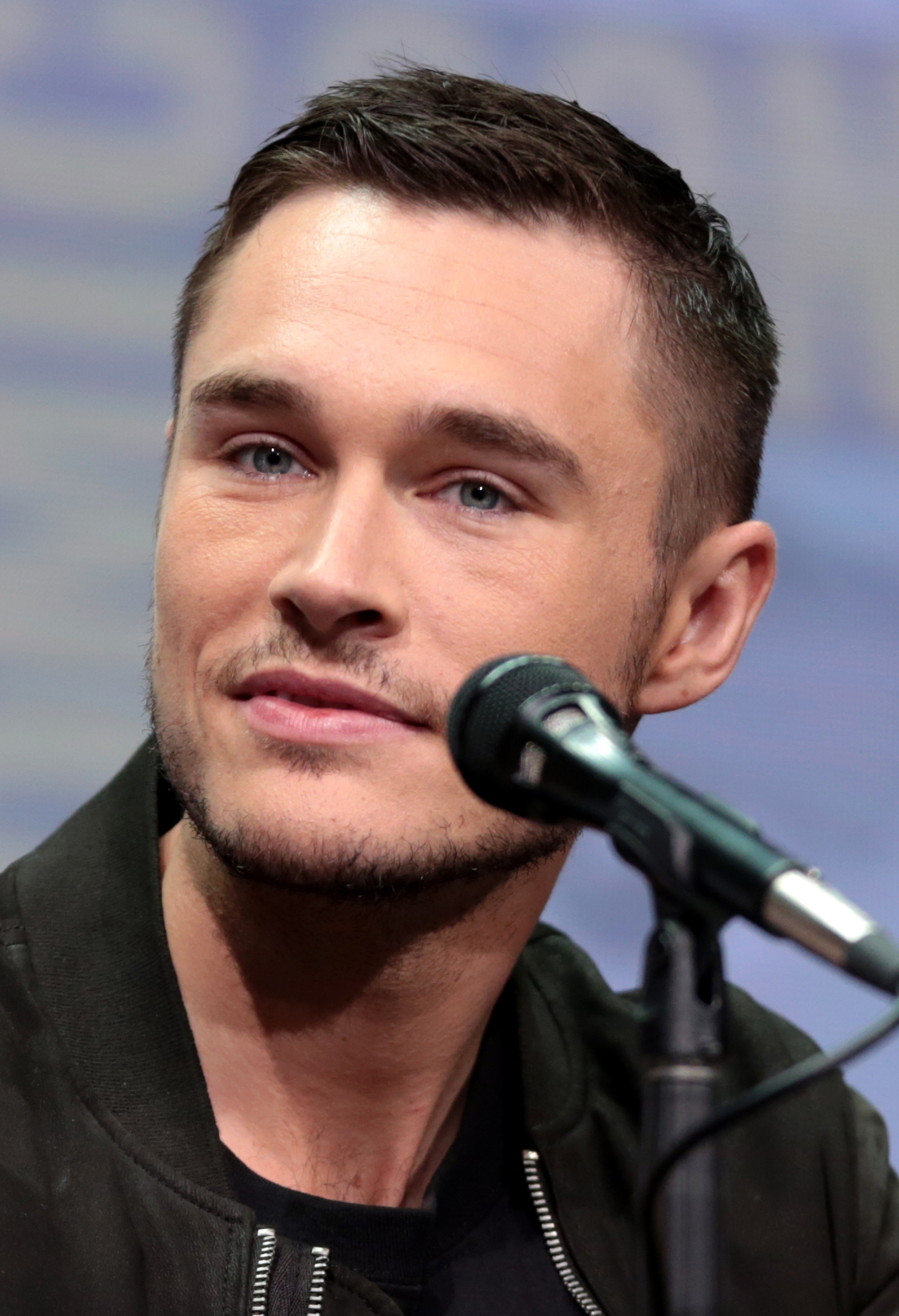
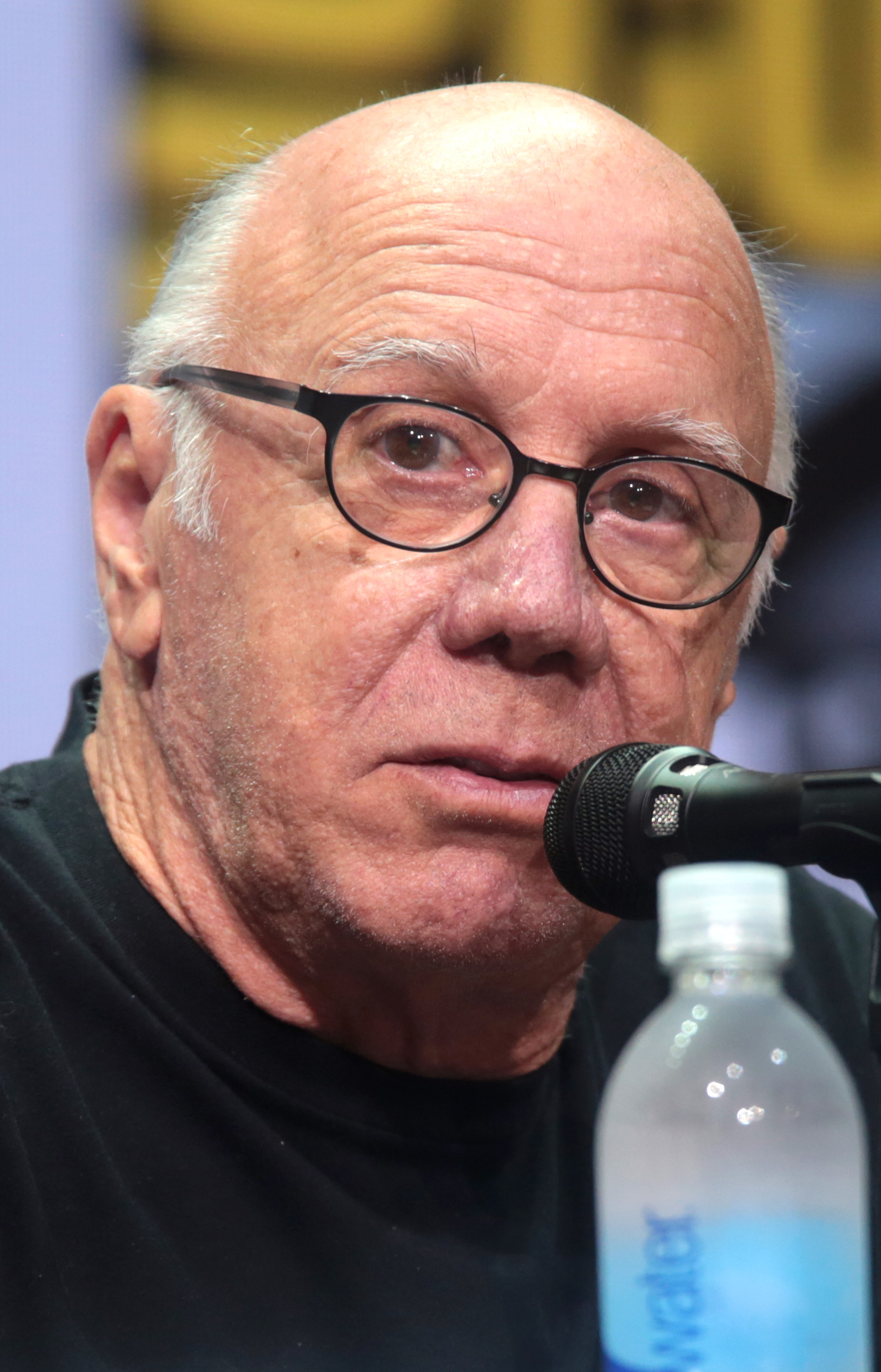
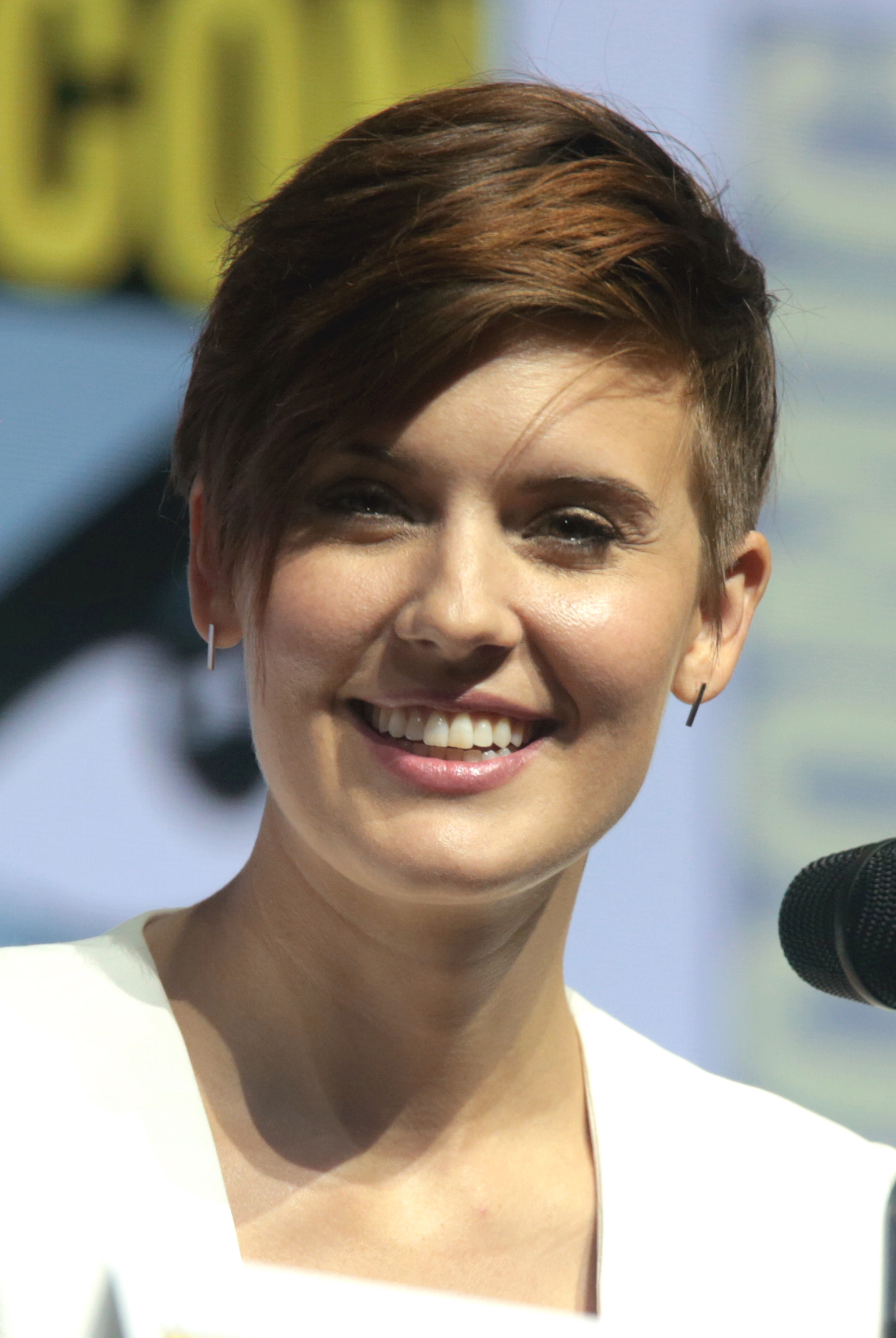
Danay García (Luciana Galvez), Daniel Sharman (Troy Otto), Sam Underwood (Jake Otto), Dayton Callie (Jeremiah Otto), and Maggie Grace (Althea Szewczyk-Przygocki)
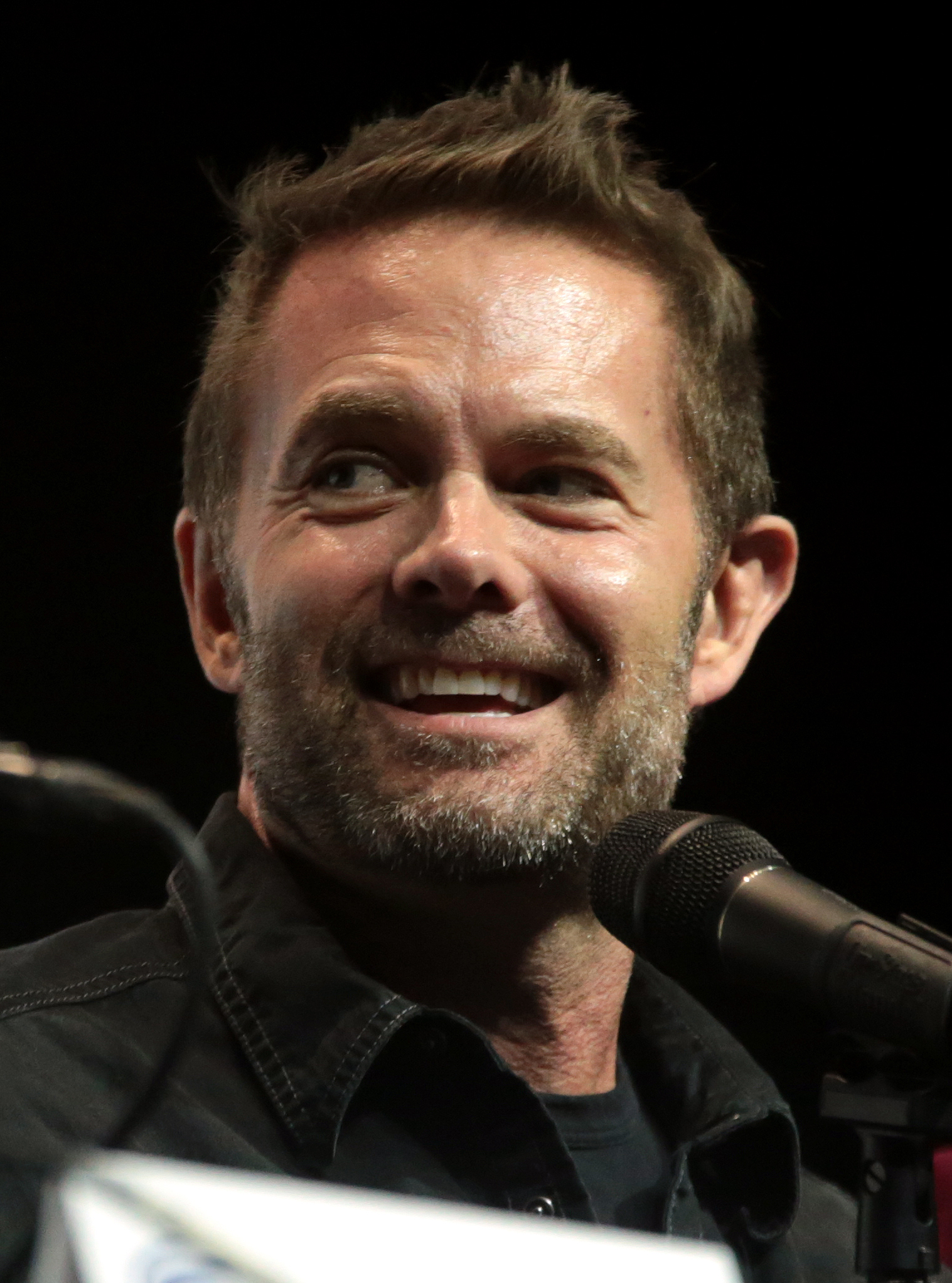
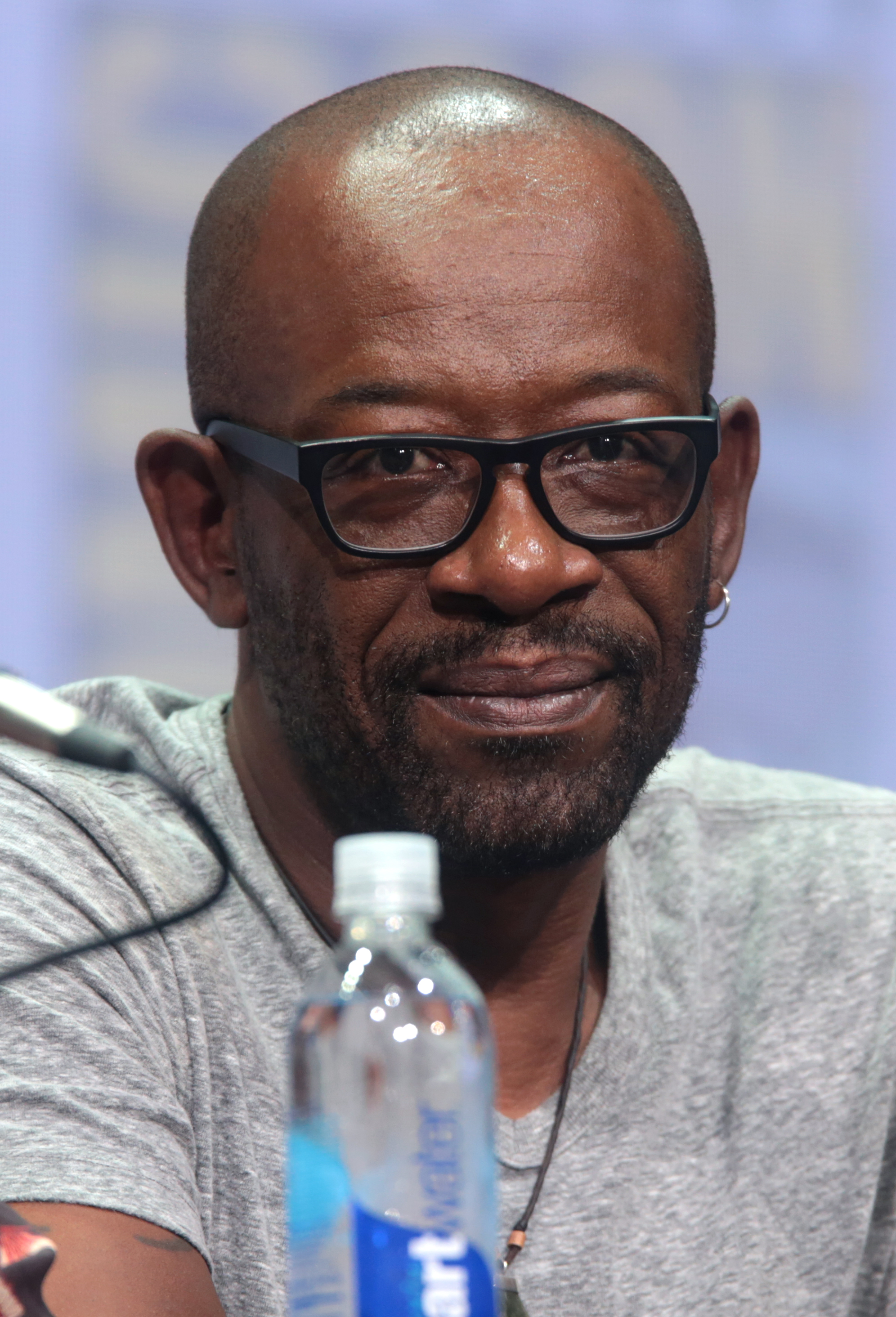
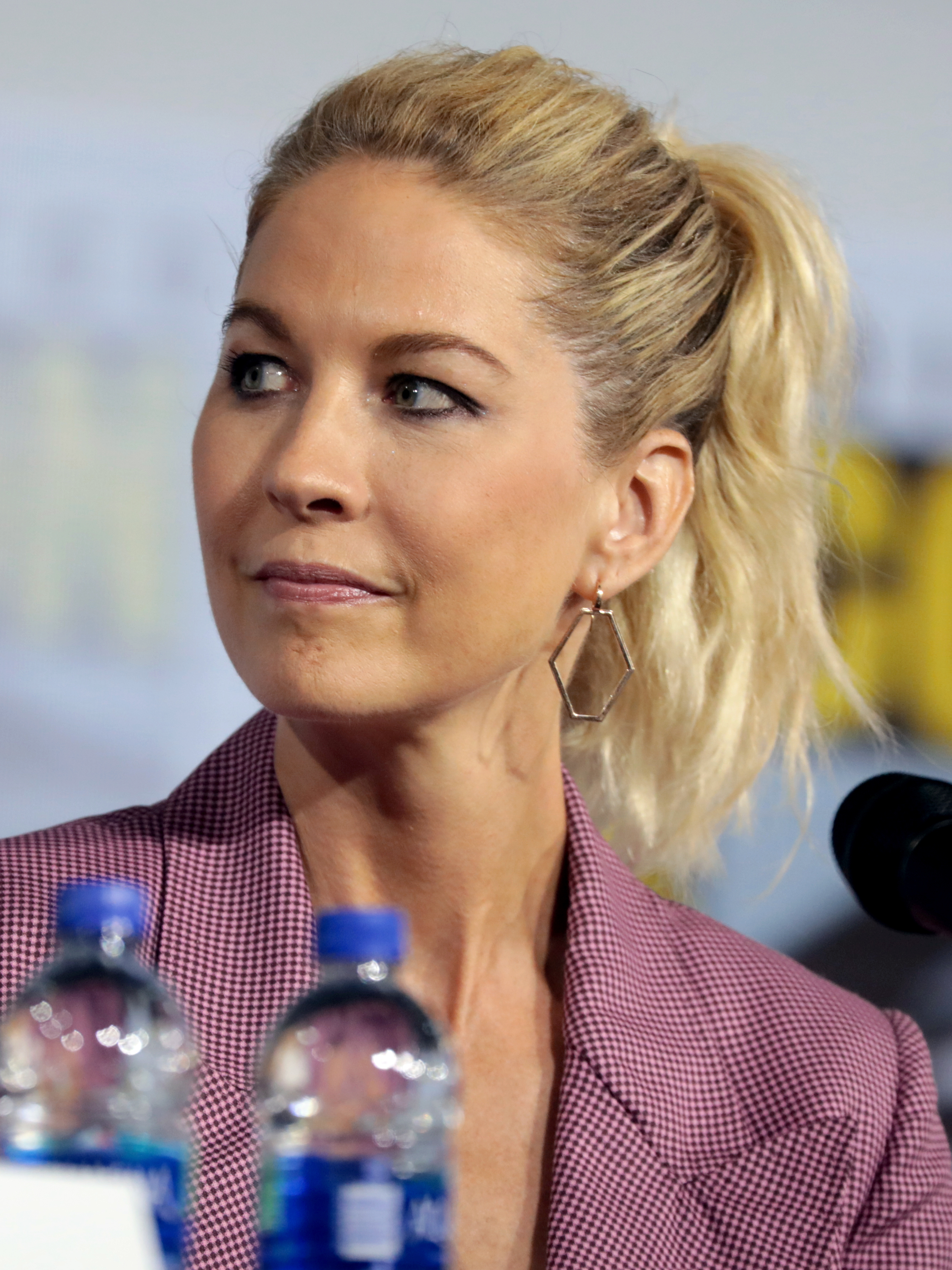
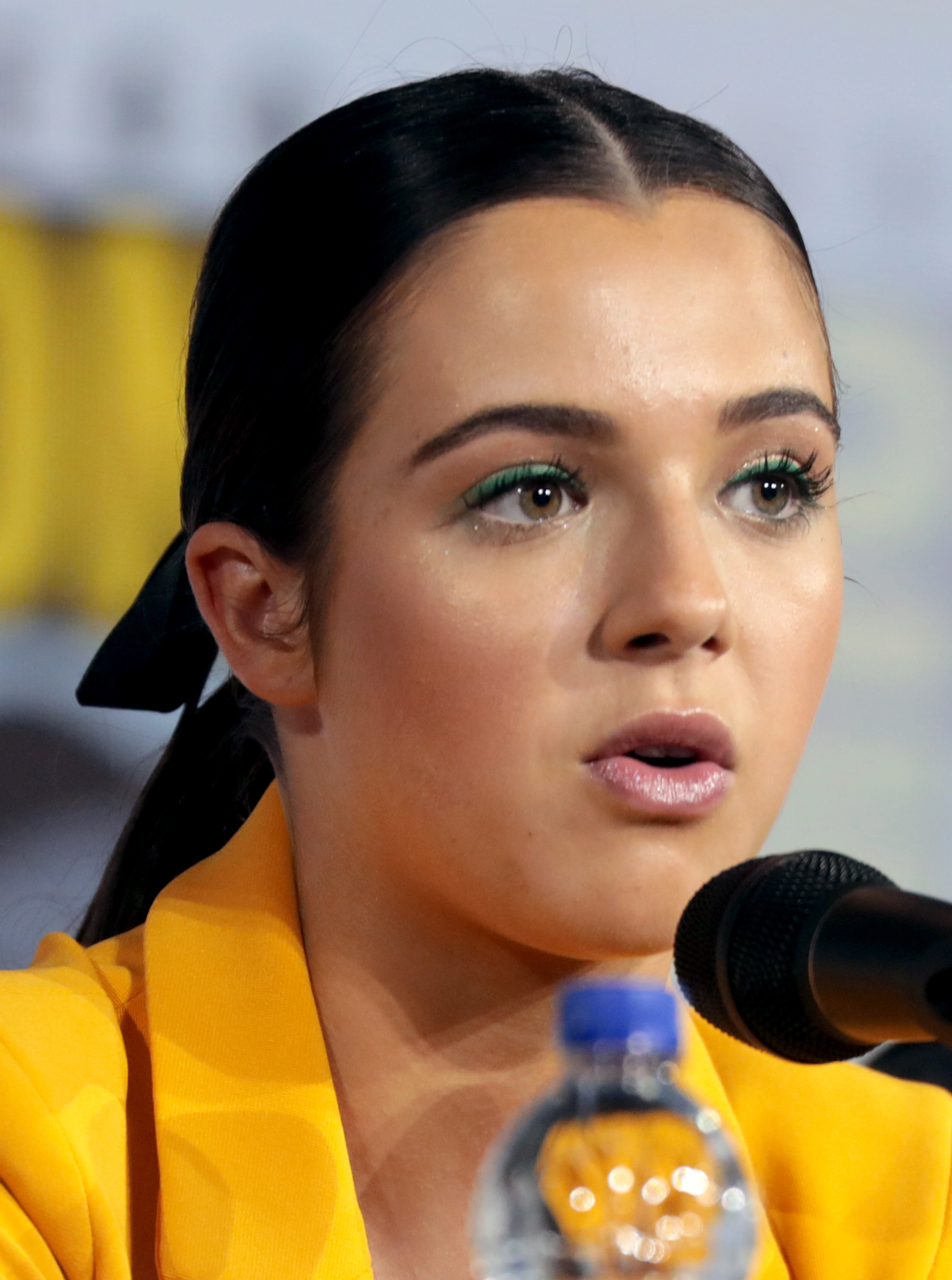
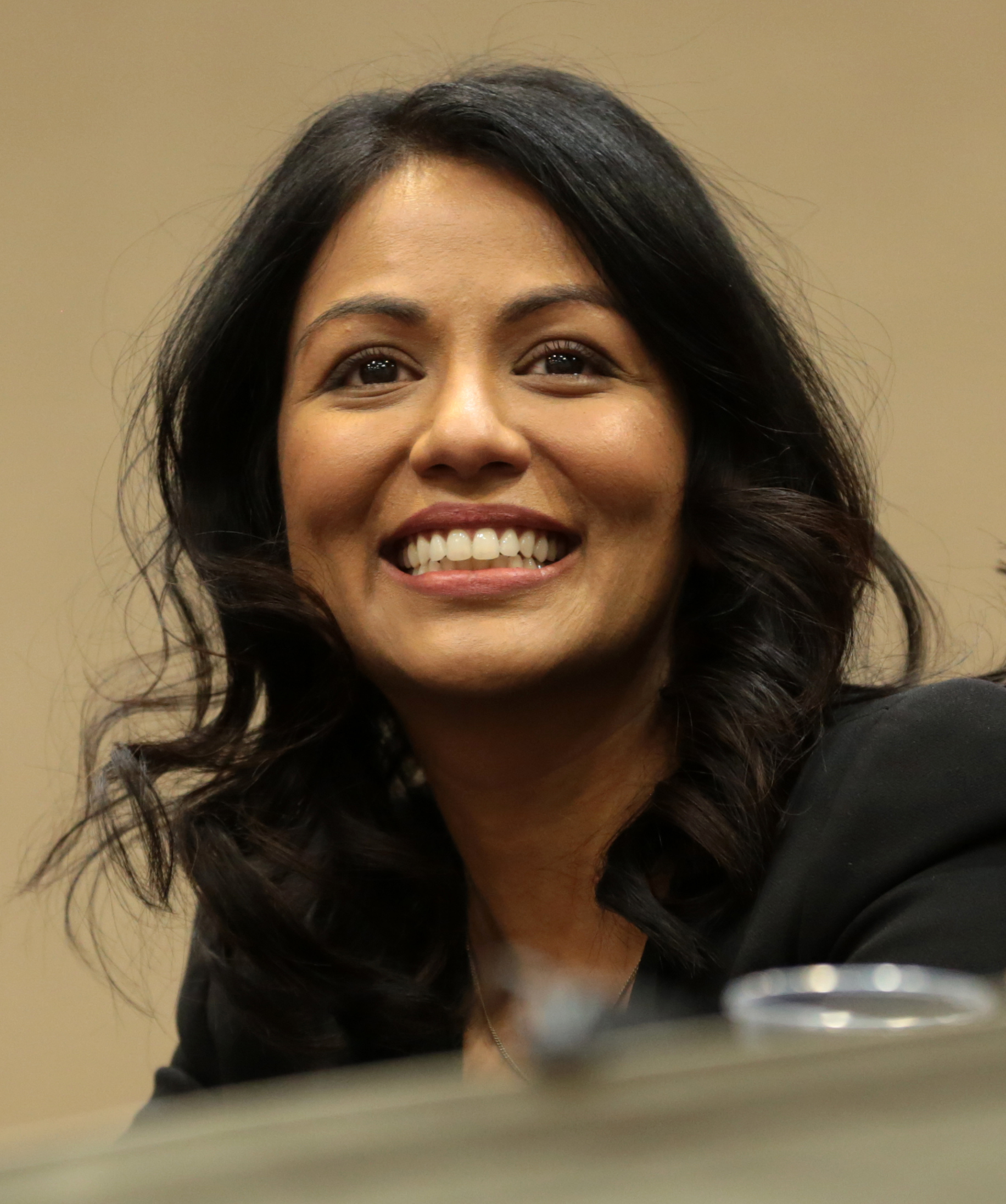
Garret Dillahunt (John Dorie), Lennie James (Morgan Jones), Jenna Elfman (June Dorie), Alexa Nisenson (Charlie), and Karen David (Grace Mukherjee)
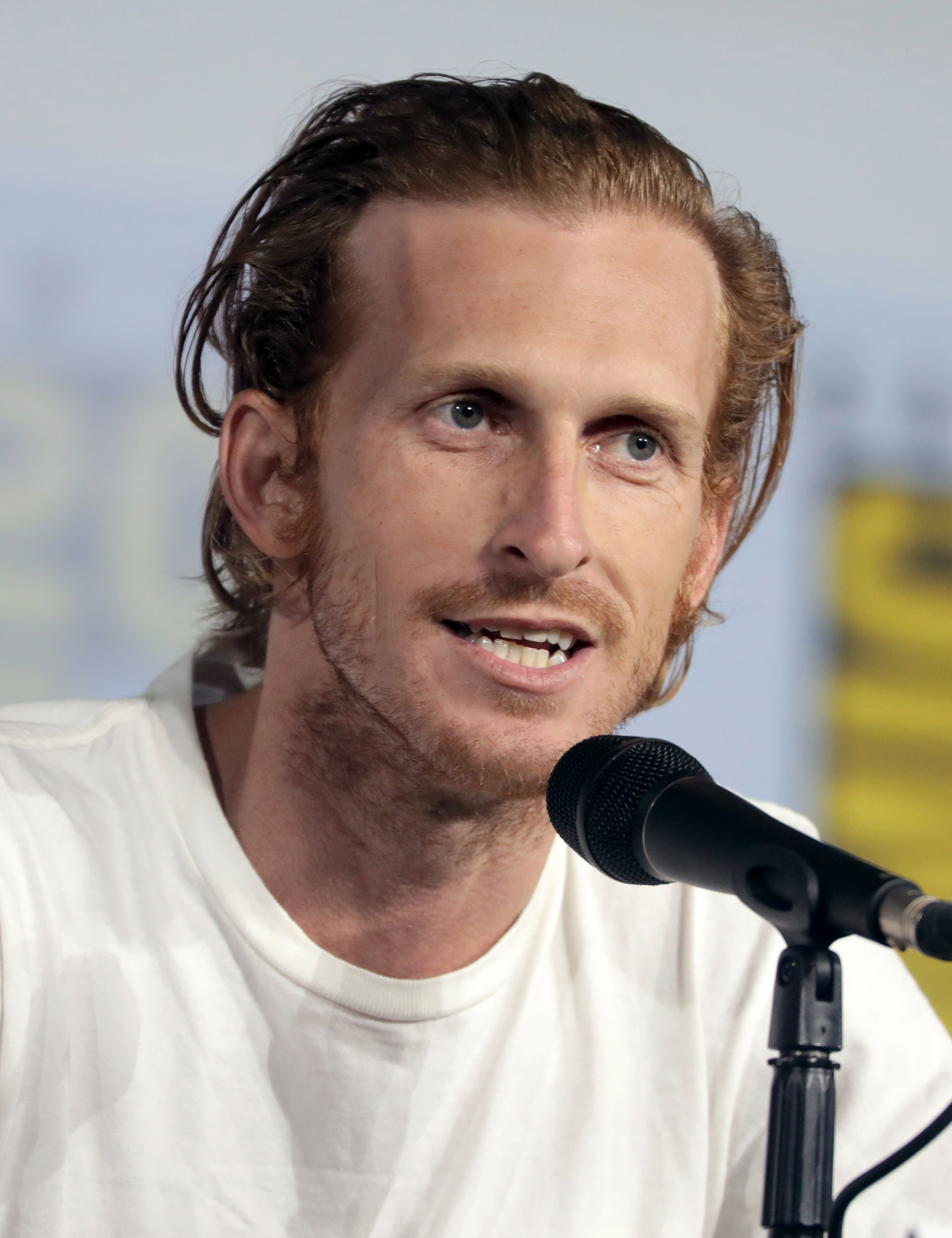
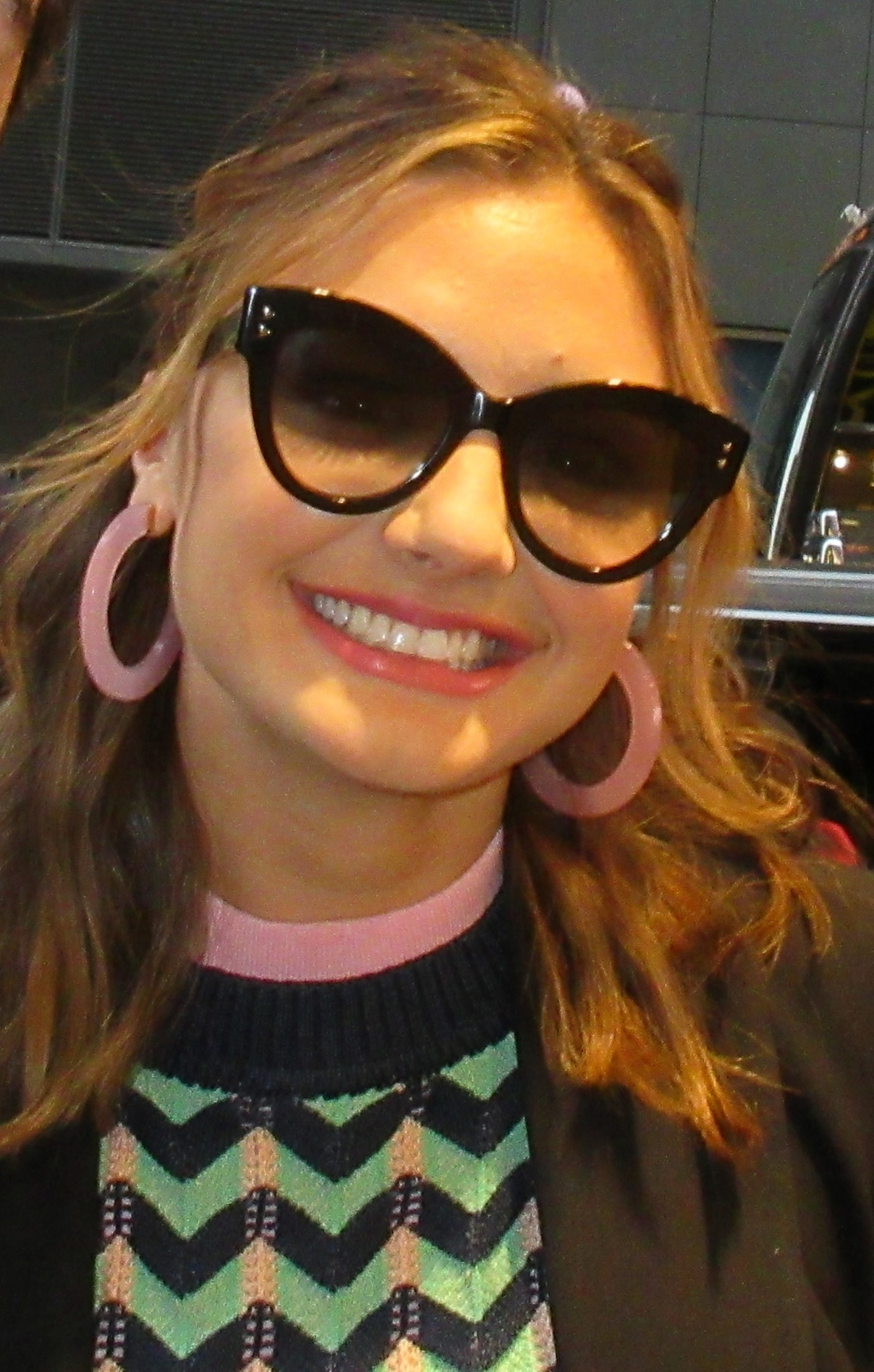
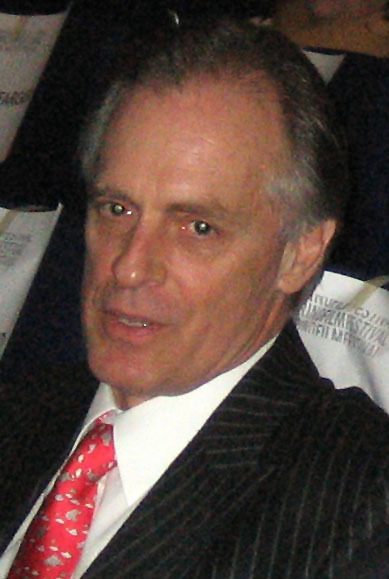
Austin Amelio (Dwight), Christine Evangelista (Sherry), and Keith Carradine (John Dorie Sr.)

=== Table ===
Actor	Character	Seasons							
Actor	Character	1	2	3	4	5	6	7	8
Main cast
Kim Dickens	Madison Clark	Main	Main	Main	Main			Guest	Main
Cliff Curtis	Travis Manawa	Main	Main	Main					
Frank Dillane	Nicholas "Nick" Clark	Main	Main	Main	Main				
Alycia Debnam-Carey	Alicia Clark	Main	Main	Main	Main	Main	Main	Main	Special Guest
Elizabeth Rodriguez	Elizabeth "Liza" Ortiz	Main	Guest						
Mercedes Mason	Ofelia Salazar	Main	Main	Main					
Lorenzo James Henrie	Christopher "Chris" Manawa	Main	Main						
Rubén Blades	Daniel Salazar	Main (Note: Blades is not credited from episode 2.08 to 3.02, then as "Also Starring" in episode 3.03 and as a main cast member again starting from episode 3.04.)	Main	Main		Main	Main	Main	Main
Colman Domingo	Victor Strand	Guest	Main	Main	Main	Main	Main	Main	Main
Michelle Ang	Alex		Main (Note: Only appears in episode 2.03 and 2.05.)						
Danay García	Luciana Galvez		Recurring	Main	Main	Main	Main	Main	Main
Daniel Sharman	Troy Otto		Stand-in	Main					Main (Note: Uncredited non-speak role in episode 8.06.)
Sam Underwood	Jake Otto			Main					
Dayton Callie	Jeremiah Otto		Guest	Main					
Lisandra Tena	Lola Guerrero			Main					
Maggie Grace	Althea "Al" Szewczyk-Przygocki				Main	Main	Main	Guest	
Garret Dillahunt	John Dorie				Main	Main	Main		
Lennie James	Morgan Jones				Main	Main	Main	Main	Main
Jenna Elfman	June "Naomi/Laura" Dorie				Main	Main	Main	Main	Main
Alexa Nisenson	Charlie				Recurring	Main	Main	Main	Guest
Karen David	Grace Mukherjee					Main	Main	Main	Main
Austin Amelio	Dwight					Main	Main	Main	Main
Mo Collins	Sarah Rabinowitz				Recurring	Recurring	Main	Main	
Colby Hollman	Wes					Recurring	Main	Main	
Zoe Colletti	Dakota						Main	Stand-in	
Christine Evangelista	Sherry					Guest (Note: Uncredited voice role in episode 5.16.)	Main	Main	Main
Keith Carradine	John Dorie Sr.						Main	Main	
Recurring cast
Patricia Reyes Spíndola	Griselda Salazar	Recurring	Guest						
Shawn Hatosy	Cpl. Andrew Adams	Recurring							
Sandrine Holt	Dr. Bethany Exner	Recurring							
Daniel Zovatto	Jack Kipling		Recurring						
Arturo Del Puerto	Luis Flores		Recurring						
Dougray Scott	Thomas Abigail		Recurring						
Marlene Forte	Celia Flores		Recurring						
Paul Calderón	Alejandro Nuñez		Recurring						
Alejandro Edda	Marco Rodriguez		Recurring						
Karen Bethzabe	Elena Reyes		Recurring	Guest					
Ramses Jimenez	Hector Reyes		Recurring	Guest					
Andres Londono	Oscar Diaz		Recurring						
Raul Casso	Andrés Diaz		Recurring						
Brenda Strong	Ilene Stowe		Recurring	Guest					
Kelly Blatz	Brandon Luke		Recurring						
Kenny Wormald	Derek		Recurring						
Michael William Freeman	Blake Sarno			Recurring					
Matt Lasky	Cooper			Recurring					
Rae Gray	Gretchen Trimbol			Recurring					
Sarah Benoit	Pat Daley			Recurring					
Jesse Borrego	Efrain Morales			Recurring					
Michael Greyeyes	Qaletaqa "Taqa" Walker			Recurring					
Justin Rain	Lee "Crazy Dog"			Recurring					
Kevin Zegers	Melvin				Recurring				
Evan Gamble	Ennis				Recurring				
Sebastian Sozzi	Cole				Recurring		Guest		
Rhoda Griffis	Vivian				Recurring		Guest		
Kenneth Wayne Bradley	Douglas				Recurring		Guest		
Tonya Pinkins	Martha				Recurring				
Aaron Stanford	Jim Brauer				Recurring				
Daryl Mitchell	Wendell Rabinowitz				Recurring	Recurring	Guest	Recurring	
Matt Frewer	Logan / "Desert Fox"					Recurring			
Cooper Dodson	Dylan					Recurring			
Bailey Gavulic	Annie					Recurring			
Ethan Suess	Max					Recurring			
Sydney Lemmon	Isabelle Russo					Recurring	Guest	Guest	
Mikala Gibson	Doris					Recurring			
Cory Hart	Rollie					Recurring	Recurring		
Peter Jacobson	Jacob Kessner					Recurring	Recurring	Guest	
Colby Minifie	Virginia					Recurring	Recurring		
Holly Curran	Janis					Recurring	Guest		
Brigitte Kali Canales	Rachel						Recurring		
Craig Nigh	Hill						Recurring		
Justin Smith	Marcus						Recurring		
John Glover	Theodore "Teddy" Maddox						Recurring		
Nick Stahl	Jason Riley						Recurring	Stand-in	
Omid Abtahi	Howard						Guest	Recurring	
Demetrius Grosse	Emile LaRoux						Guest		
Demetrius Grosse	Josiah LaRoux							Recurring	
Spenser Granese	Arnold "Arno"							Recurring	
Jacob Kyle Young	Sage							Recurring	
Maya Eshet	Sam "Shrike" Krennick								Recurring
Avaya White	Morgan "Mo/Wren"						Stand-in	Stand-in	
Zoey Merchant	Morgan "Mo/Wren"								Recurring
Jayla Walton	Odessa "Dove" Sanderson								Recurring
Gavin Warren	Finch								Recurring
Daniel Rashid	Ben "Crane" Krennick								Recurring
Isha Blaaker	Frank								Recurring
Julian Grey	Klaus								Recurring
Randy Bernales	Russell								Recurring
Antonella Rose	Tracy Otto								Recurring

== Main characters ==
=== Madison Clark ===
Madison Clark, sometime called Maddie, portrayed by Kim Dickens, is a former high school guidance counselor and is the mother to Nick and Alicia and ex-fiancé of Travis. Madison is described as intelligent and willful to the point she sometimes becomes forceful. She is quick to adapt to the new world. Highly domineering, Madison likes being in control of situations, and is prone to feeling tense during disagreements with others or in situations where she is largely powerless. Even though she usually maintains a stubborn demeanor, Madison often becomes afraid and uncertain when the people she cares about (especially her family) are in danger. She has shown to have a ruthlessly dark and uncaring side.

=== Travis Manawa ===
Travis Manawa, portrayed by Cliff Curtis, is a former English teacher who divorced from his wife Elizabeth Ortiz and had to deal with the resentment of his troubled son Chris. Travis later became engaged to guidance counselor Madison Clark and integrated himself into her family including her two children, Nick and Alicia. Travis is a good-natured man and loving father, a protective, pragmatic and resolute individual who holds a firm personal conviction and belief that everything can be fixed, one way or another. He has been described as "the one character who desperately tries to cling to his humanity, the one person who believes that there is always a way to repair something that is broken and that a corner will always be turned" and "a good man trying to do right by everyone in his life". He holds a strong belief that civilization will eventually be rebuilt.

=== Nick Clark ===
Nicholas Clark, better known as Nick, portrayed by Frank Dillane, is the son of Madison Clark and Steven Clark, who died a few years before the apocalypse, and the brother of Alicia Clark. Nick has had a troubled past and has always chosen the wrong road. He is very down to earth but flawed individual with severe addictions to drugs, specifically heroin. Despite his flaws, Nick is a very intelligent young man, and is shown to care for his immediate family and eventually the family of his mother's boyfriend Travis after some reluctance. He is quite intelligent and quick thinking, such as being the first member of the group to realize that the infected aren't infected, but rather dead, going as far as to prevent Alicia from visiting Matt, as he knew he would already be dead and attack her. However he can be selfish at times, such as taking Griselda Salazar's oxycontin which she was using due to her injury.

=== Alicia Clark ===
Alicia Clark, sometime called Licia, portrayed by Alycia Debnam-Carey, is the daughter of Madison and Steven Clark, who died a few years before the apocalypse. She is the younger sister of Nick Clark. She was a formerly high-ranking member and resident of the Broke Jaw Ranch community as she becomes a de facto co-leader, and briefly had a relationship with Jake Otto.

=== Liza Ortiz ===
Elizabeth Ortiz, better known as Liza, portrayed by Elizabeth Rodriguez, is a main character in the first two seasons of Fear the Walking Dead. Liza is the ex-wife of Travis Manawa and the mother of Chris Manawa. Liza is a described as a "Latino-American and one of many LA residents dealing with the start of the outbreak". Following her and Travis's divorce, Chris blames his father for their separation.

Liza is killed off in the first-season finale when Travis shoots her out of mercy after being bitten by a walker. After her death, Chris is shown to be even more angered and traumatized and blames his father Travis. On the beach, Liza reveals to Madison that she had been bitten. Liza pleads with Madison and Travis to euthanize her before she turns. Travis promises to protect Chris before shooting Liza. The group holds a funeral for Liza and buries her at sea. However, Chris reacts violently and blames Travis for her death.

=== Ofelia Salazar ===
Ofelia Salazar, portrayed by Mercedes Mason, is the daughter of Daniel and Griselda Salazar. After the death of her mother and apparent loss of her father, Ofelia becomes much more distant. Ofelia is described as being born in El Salvador and immigrating to Los Angeles with her parents when she was a baby. She is strong, independent, beautiful; professional but fierce, protective of her parents whom she feels are backwards. In Season 3, Ofelia is bitten by a walker, and she dies of the bite infection in "El Matadero" moments before she can be reunited with her father. In Season 7, Daniel's mental breakdown results in him believing that Ofelia is still alive and he has to find her with the episode "Ofelia" being named after her. Daniel eventually reveals that his confusion comes from his guilt over not being able to make amends with his daughter and be honest about his past. Daniel is eventually snapped out of it by Strand and Alicia and he finally accepts Ofelia's death.

=== Chris Manawa ===
Christopher Manawa, better known as Chris, portrayed by Lorenzo James Henrie, is the teenage son of Travis Manawa and Liza Ortiz. Christopher was shown to be a normal, highly intelligent teenager before the apocalypse occurred, though he did appear to be extremely angered at his father for leaving and seemed to hold this against him for the rest of his life. Chris slowly adapted to the apocalypse in the beginning and retained his kind side, though after the death of his mother, he is shown to be even more angered and traumatized. But later on during the apocalypse, Chris takes a dramatic turn for the worse and is shown to be angered at his father, distant from everyone and has turned into a noticeably colder individual. He is shown to willing allow members of his own group to die as shown when he almost allows Madison to be killed by walkers and threatens to kill Alicia if she tells of what happened. After separating from his father, Chris is killed by his new companions after he injures himself in a car accident. A furious Travis brutally beats Chris' killers to death with his own bare hands in revenge.

=== Daniel Salazar ===
Daniel Salazar, portrayed by Rubén Blades, is the husband of Griselda and the father of Ofelia. He is Lola Guerrero's former chief security officer at the Gonzalez Dam. Daniel is a highly intelligent, caring, cautious and formidable man who is a strong, determined survivor. Daniel's past as a secret agent of the Salvadoran Junta and CIA has revealed him to be a highly trained killer, having directly killed 100 people himself (with many more killed indirectly). His training and survival skills have shaped him into a formidable combatant. He is highly adept with firearms and hands to hand combat. Daniel is also shown to be a skilled torturer with extensive knowledge of interrogation techniques and is willing, albeit reluctantly, to use this skill when he feel it is necessary to survive, as seen when he brutally tortured Andrew Adams. Daniel however does not appear to be pleased with the past atrocities he has committed or was forced to commit, and regrets being the monster that he was forced to become. Despite his murderous past, Daniel has demonstrated that he cares about his family more than anything else and is a loving husband and father who vowed to give his daughter the best life possible. Daniel was shown to be devastated by the loss of his beloved wife, the anchor that kept him stable. He subsequently came unhinged for a time and nearly killed himself. Daniel is extremely cautious around those he does not trust, such as Victor Strand and appears to be highly skilled at identifying a potential threat. While under the leadership of Dante Esquivel, Daniel briefly re-embraces his cruel nature but ultimately turns on Dante and his men, saving his allies from certain death, demonstrating that he will never harm the innocent again and that he is ready to kill a threat without any hesitation.

=== Victor Strand ===
Victor Strand, often referred to by his surname Strand, portrayed by Colman Domingo, is a mysterious character who has acquired great personal wealth as immediately indicated by his suit and jewelry, then later by his gated coast-side estate, Aston Martin and luxury yacht, the Abigail. He appears to already have some knowledge of the outbreak and how it manifests itself in humans. It is unknown how long he was imprisoned at the temporary hospital set up in Raynard Community College before Nick arrived. He is calm and does not panic when confronting the walkers, even when he was trapped at the end of a locked corridor as a herd approached. He appears to have adapted quickly to the new world, telling Nicholas Clark that the only way to survive a mad world is to embrace the madness. Victor has a good sense of judgement, believing that Nick has the skills to survive, identifying his heroin addiction as a precursor to the behavior necessary for survival. Strand later joined Madison and her group.

=== Alex ===
Alex, portrayed by Michelle Ang, is a pragmatic and quiet survivor of Asian descent introduced in the Fear the Walking Dead: Flight 462 web series. Alex appears to have more knowledge about the infection than others. When a dangerous situation occurs she is quick to take rational steps to stop it, even if others dislike or are confused about her actions. After the plane crashed, she went to great lengths to protect a severely injured Jake from dying, decisively killing two passengers who tried to harm him. Strand dashes to the stern and swiftly hacks the rope attaching a raft, abandoning Alex and Jake in the middle of the ocean. Alex is seen again when Travis is imprisoned on Connor's ship. She explains to Travis that Connor rescued her after Jake died. She blames Travis for being cut away from The Abigail, which felt like a death warrant to her. Her fate is left unknown.

=== Luciana Galvez ===
Luciana Galvez, sometime called Luci, portrayed by Danay García, is Nick's girlfriend and a former scout for La Colonia, a survivor community in Tijuana, Baja California and was briefly a resident of the Broke Jaw Ranch community. She later joins the Dell Diamond baseball stadium community and is a member of Morgan Jones' group.

In season 3, Nick and an injured Luciana are taken captive by Troy Otto and his men. The two inadvertently cause the base to become overrun by the undead, but they are reunited with Nick's family and friends. With Luciana having been left unconscious from her worsening condition, Nick successfully forces the Otto family to treat her and she eventually recovers from her injuries. However, Luciana decides to leave Nick and the Broke Jaw Ranch in order to return to Mexico and seek out any survivors of her people.

By the start of season 4 two years later, Luciana has been reunited with Nick and has resumed her romantic relationship with him. However, their community at the Dell Diamond baseball stadium is destroyed by a massive attack by the Vultures, apparently killing everyone aside from Luciana, Nick, Strand and Alicia. The group seek revenge, leading them to briefly come into conflict with Morgan Jones and his new friends John Dorie and Al. While seeking revenge upon Ennis alone, Nick is killed in retaliation by a young girl named Charlie, devastating Luciana. After successfully getting revenge upon the Vultures and being stopped from killing Charlie, Luciana falls into a depression and is left somewhat aimless. Following a massive hurricane, Luciana meets the mysterious Polar Bear who, before dying, inspires her to continue his work of helping other people.

In season 5, Luciana joins the rest of Morgan's group in their mission to aid other survivors. However, she is badly injured in a plane crash in the season premiere and she spends an extended period of time recovering from her shoulder wound. After discovering Polar Bear's Tank Town oil fields, Luciana remains there producing oil until Logan and his gang invade. When Virginia and her Pioneers take over, Luciana agrees to show them how to make the gas in exchange for the others being allowed to leave with a tanker full of gas. She is later brought to Humbug's Gulch where she tries to reassure her friends as they are captured by Virginia's group.

In season 6, Luciana continues to run Tank Town for Virginia until it is destroyed by a doomsday cult. After Virginia's defeat, Luciana moves to Morgan's new community where she accompanies Alicia, Al and Wes on their reconnaissance mission into the cult's base, the Holding. After the cult successfully launches ten nuclear warheads, Luciana joins Daniel, Wes, Sarah, Jacob, Charlie and Rollie in seeking shelter from the coming destruction. Realizing that Rollie is a traitor who has sold them out, Daniel asks Luciana for her gun before executing the man with it. As Daniel has been proven to have been right, Luciana backs him up about the coordinates that he had heard over the radio which turn out to have come from Al who has sent her CRM pilot friend Isabelle to rescue the group. As they fly away, Luciana reassures Daniel that he just needs a little help and that as long as they stick together, they will be fine.

In season 7, Luciana works with Daniel on his mental issues, forming a close bond with him. However, Daniel becomes convinced that his daughter Ofelia is still alive and wanders off, causing Daniel, Luciana and Wes to get captured by the Stalkers, leading to a lot of frustration between the group. After Daniel brutally kills Arno, the leader of the Stalkers, Luciana is able to convince the rest to join their fight against Strand and his forces at the Tower. With Luciana having witnessed him at his worst and still only expressed nothing but acceptance and understanding, an emotional Daniel declares that they might not be blood, but he and Luciana are family from now on. However, after Daniel reveals that only the thought that Ofelia is still alive keeps him going, Luciana lies to him that Ofelia is in Strand's Tower as she believes that they need Daniel's help to win against Strand and that it is the only way to get it. Disgusted by Luciana's actions, Wes abandons the group for Strand and Luciana sticks to her lie even though Daniel warns her that it could break him for good if he discovers that Ofelia really isn't in the Tower. When Daniel finally gets into the Tower, he learns the truth from Strand who attempts to continue Luciana's lie using Charlie. However, Strand, Alicia and Charlie are finally able to snap Daniel out of it and back to normal. Subsequently, Daniel seems to be more confused by Luciana's actions than hurt or angry about them. Luciana apologizes to her friend for what she did, but their conversation is interrupted when they are forced to take cover from gunfire.

In season 8, Daniel has been separated from Luciana and Charlie by PADRE. After reuniting with Madison seven years after the destruction of the Tower, Daniel tells her that he doesn't know what became of them and neither does Morgan. Following the defeat of the Krennick siblings, Daniel and Madison are finally reunited with Luciana and Charlie who have been running a refinery operation for PADRE and using their resources to continue Polar Bear's work with Luciana even taking on the moniker of Polar Bear herself. Luciana reveals that she had only agreed to work for PADRE if they would release Daniel who the organization had seen as being too old to be of any use and had planned to kill him. However, the reunion turns bittersweet when the conflict with Troy Otto leads to the death of Charlie and a number of Luciana's people. Daniel decides to join Luciana's group as she's the only family that he has left. Following the destruction of PADRE, Luciana continues to lead her operation with Daniel who is unexpectedly reunited with his long-lost cat Skidmark who had been found by Alicia and discreetly returned to Daniel.

=== Troy Otto ===
Troy Otto, portrayed by Daniel Sharman, he is the youngest son of Jeremiah Otto and Jake's half-brother. Troy was a formerly high-ranking member of the Broke Jaw Ranch community. He is described as having a "wild temperament" and being "charismatic with a cruel streak".

Described as having "embraced the violence of the apocalypse", with his "isolationist viewpoint" of being "intensely suspicious of outsiders" having allowed him to be "better-suited for leading in this new post-apocalyptic world", after having a hateful mother and drunk negligent father. Troy is the last surviving member of his family, as well as the last survivor of Broke Jaw Ranch.

Travis, Madison and Alicia are captured by an armed group and taken to a military compound, where Travis is separated from them and is taken to a basement while Madison and Alicia are taken to an office. At the basement, Travis finds himself with Nick, an injured Luciana and other captives. The captives are shot to see how long it takes for them to turn. Travis, Luciana, and Nick attempt to escape, Travis and Luciana descending into a sewer but Travis is re-captured and made to fight the dead in a pit. Troy enters a locked office where Madison and Alicia are being held. He offers them tea and seems hospitable, until he starts interrogating them. Madison explains to Troy that she's looking for her son, Nick. Madison then demands to know where they've taken Travis. Troy avoids answering, but promises to let them go once he's finished "processing" them. He takes an interest in Madison. She impales one of his eyes with a spoon and takes him hostage, demanding her family's release. Nick finds a horde of walkers at the end of the sewer and makes his way back. The family is reunited and Jake chastises Troy for killing innocent people. The Clark's decline Jake's invitation to Broke Jaw Ranch, but the compound is overrun with walkers, forcing everyone to leave. Travis, Luciana and Alicia escape aboard a helicopter with Jake and Charlene while Madison and Nick leave in a truck with Troy.

They reach Broke Jaw Ranch and learn the helicopter did not arrive. Jake, Alicia and Luciana later return to the ranch, the helicopter having been shot down, resulting in Travis's death and leading to Charlene's. Troy, Jake and Jeremiah vow to the ranch they will get justice. Troy expresses contempt for Nick to Madison. Jake warns Troy to leave the Clark family alone. Troy takes Nick on a boar hunt, planning to attack him; instead they begin to become friends. The team investigating the helicopter shooting are overdue; Troy leads a second team with Madison accompanying them. They are ambushed by Native Americans led by Qaletaqa Walker, on whose ancestral land Broke Jaw Ranch is built. They return to the ranch without their weapons or shoes. During the trek back, Troy contemplates killing Madison after she gives unwanted leadership advice. With the threat of the Native Americans invading the ranch, the Trimbol family leave despite Troy's efforts to get them to stay. Troy follows the family and murders them. Troy helps to train the militia. At Madison's insistence, Troy leads a team to rescue Alicia from Black Hat Reservation, breaking a truce and killing several of Walker's men. When Walker's group move onto the ranch, Troy is incensed. He refuses to hand over his weapons leading to a gunfight before Nick convinces him to stand down. Madison convinces Walker not to execute Troy and he is instead exiled.

After being exiled from the ranch, Troy lives off of the land while continuing to write in his journal. He revisits the scene of the helicopter crash, finds a grenade launcher and buries the rancher Walker had disfigured. Troy visits Nick in the night and warns him that the ranch will be destroyed. Nick and Jake set out to find Troy and discover him using the grenade launcher to guide a herd of walking dead toward the ranch. Troy explains that the herd will kill people or force them into the desert, as he was, and only the fittest will survive. Jake holds Troy at gunpoint but hesitates on learning that Nick killed their father and Alicia kept it secret. Jake is bitten and dies following an amputation, and Troy mourns his brother, saying he brought the herd to regain their legacy. A wall of trailers and RVs hope to turn the herd but this fails and the ranchers and natives evacuate to the bunker-like pantry. Troy subsequently joins Nick in an attempt to rescue the survivors from the pantry, but it fails, leaving them trapped until Madison, Strand and Walker arrive to rescue them and Alicia, Ofelia and Crazy Dog, the only survivors of the group that had gone into the pantry.

Following the destruction of the ranch, Troy joins Madison's group with Nick covering up his friend's role in the ranch's destruction. Troy travels with Nick in particular, forming a deep bond with him. However, Troy's actions come to light during the fight for the dam with Troy proving to be unrepentant. Enraged, Madison bashes Troy's head in with a hammer in revenge, seemingly killing him. His body is subsequently washed out with the flood when the dam is destroyed.

In season 8, Troy is revealed to have survived both the hammer blows and the flood, although he was left blinded in his left eye as a result. Vengeful, Troy seeks to take PADRE for himself and his people, claiming to have killed Alicia and left her to reanimate. The conflict with Troy leaves Charlie dead before he's revealed to have a daughter named Tracy, born in the years since the dam's destruction. Troy eventually explains to Madison that his wife, Serena, had rescued Troy from the dam's destruction and they fell in love and had Tracy together. Alicia had inspired Serena to help people in need after responding to Troy's distress call when Serena was bitten. However, Serena's death at the hands of a man whom she was trying to help had caused the grief-stricken Troy to blame Alicia and Madison for her loss. Troy initially plans to attack PADRE with a massive herd, the exact same way that he had destroyed Broke Jaw Ranch, but Troy falls into a trap set by Ben Krennick who wants PADRE for himself, forcing Troy to make a deal with Madison. Working together with Madison to stop Ben, Troy becomes remorseful for his actions, particularly as Serena had wanted him to keep believing in Alicia's mission even after it had killed her. Troy saves Madison's life and even willingly helps to stop the herd, but Madison fatally impales him on Alicia's prosthetic arm, believing that Troy getting a second chance from Alicia had caused her daughter's death. The dying Troy implores Madison to take care of Tracy for him, claiming that Tracy is actually Alicia's daughter whom he had kidnapped. Troy subsequently reanimates, but he is put down and buried by his daughter while Troy's people go through with the attack and destroy PADRE.

It's later revealed that Alicia had actually survived Troy's attack on her, and that Troy's people had lied to him about seeing her as a walker, only telling Troy what he had wanted to hear after they couldn't find Alicia aside from signs that she might've survived the fight. Troy had also lied about Tracy being Alicia's daughter in order to motivate Madison to fight for her as hard as Madison did for her own kids. Madison expresses remorse for killing Troy and fulfills his last request to take in Tracy.

=== Jake Otto ===
Jeremiah Otto Jr., better known as Jake, portrayed by Sam Underwood, is Jeremiah's moralistic older son and Troy's half-brother. After being bitten by a walker, he dies, turns and has to be put down.

=== Jeremiah Otto ===
Jeremiah Otto, portrayed by Dayton Callie, is the father of Jake and Troy and the former leader and one of the four founding fathers of the Broke Jaw Ranch community. Described by showrunner Dave Erickson as having a "certain moral compass", Jeremiah is "definitely rough", with a "darker and uglier side to him as well, and it's frankly racist". Erickson has noted that Jeremiah will become "violent when he has to be".

Jeremiah is killed off in the third-season episode "Children of Wrath", after Nick shoots him due to his lack of co-operation with Qaletaqa Walker.

Jeremiah is first seen walking along the Mexican-American border with his assault rifle, where he sees Ofelia Salazar walking in the desert. He begins shooting at her, firing at her until she hides behind a tree. Soon after, he approaches her and aims his gun at her, asking Ofelia to hand over her knife, before taking Ofelia away.

Travis, Madison and Alicia are captured by an armed group and taken to a military compound, where Travis is separated from them and is taken to a basement while Madison and Alicia are taken to an office. At the basement, Travis finds himself with Nick, an injured Luciana and other captives. The captives are shot to see how long it takes for them to turn. Travis, Luciana, and Nick attempt to escape, Travis and Luciana descending into a sewer but Travis is re-captured and made to fight the dead in a pit. Meanwhile, Madison and Alicia attack Troy, impaling one of his eyes with a spoon and taking him hostage. Madison demands her family released. Nick finds a horde of walkers at the end of the sewer and makes his way back. The family is reunited but the compound is overrun with walkers, forcing everyone to leave. Travis, Luciana and Alicia escape aboard a helicopter while Madison and Nick leave in a truck with Troy.

=== Lola Guerrero ===
Lola Guerrero, portrayed by Lisandra Tena, is the former chief water utility officer and later the leader of the Gonzalez Dam community. She is shot dead in the third season finale at the Gonzalez Dam.

=== Althea Szewczyk-Przygocki ===
Althea Szewczyk-Przygocki, often called by her nickname Al, portrayed by Maggie Grace, is a curious and tactical journalist who encounters Morgan Jones and John Dorie on the road through Virginia. In season 5, it is revealed that she is also a pilot and is LGBT. In the seventh season, she is downgraded to a recurring character and departs with her lover Isabelle to find a new life, albeit one on the run from the CRM.

=== John Dorie ===
John Dorie, portrayed by Garret Dillahunt, is a former police officer who uses 2 Colts Singles as his primary weapon and is also a man of fascinating contradictions and one of the first survivors Morgan encountered in Season 4. He is a gentle soul, an innocent person in many ways, but it is no stranger to violence. He can be soft-spoken and disarmingly funny at the same time, but when the situation gets worse he shows his tough side.

In season 6's "The Door", John is shot in the chest and murdered by Dakota with one of his own guns. His body washes up in front of his cabin as a walker and his wife June puts him down. In "Things Left to Do", June buries John's body in front of his cabin and later kills Virginia with the same gun that Dakota killed John with, blaming Virginia for her husband's murder. June soon after meets John's father John Dorie Sr. and the pair ultimately forgive Dakota for John's murder shortly before she dies when Texas is nuked by the insane cult leader Teddy.

=== Morgan Jones ===
Morgan Jones, portrayed by Lennie James, is a main character on The Walking Dead. Shortly after defeating the Saviors, Morgan leaves the Junkyard and begins working his way west, ending up in Texas where he meets John Dorie. After running into a hostile group of survivors, the two men are rescued by a journalist named Althea and are then captured by Victor Strand, Luciana Galvez and Nick and Alicia Clark.

=== June Dorie ===
June, later June Dorie and formerly also known as Naomi and Laura, portrayed by Jenna Elfman. She fell in love with John Dorie after washing up at the bank behind his cabin, and he nursed her back to health. She did not tell him her name, leading him to refer to her as Laura. She left him one day out of fear of emotional attachment, always worrying he would realize she was not the Laura he fell in love with. Later, June becomes a resident of the Dell Diamond baseball stadium community until its fall and is later a member of the Vultures until the death of their leader Melvin. Then, June reunites with John and decides to re-engage in a relationship. She is currently a very important member and nurse of Morgan's group. She and John eventually marry, but John is killed by Dakota.

In Season 8, seven years after leaving Texas, June has gone rogue, attacking PADRE's forces and cutting off their trigger fingers. While helping to save Dwight and Sherry's son Finch from appendicitis, June eventually reveals that she had begun working on a cure to the walker bite infection using radiation therapy, having deduced that Alicia Clark's survival was due to her previous exposure to radiation years before. Although successful in stopping the infection, the amount of radiation needed was also fatal to her test subjects, causing June to eventually flee. After being caught by PADRE's forces, June's trigger finger is cut off and she is forced to go back to work on finding a cure with Shrike having Finch bitten as an incentive for her. Following the destruction of PADRE, June decides to travel around providing medical attention to those who need it, painting a large cross on the side of Al's old SWAT van. June agrees to take Odessa Sanderson with her and to train the girl, giving her one of John's guns. June reveals to Odessa that her first stop will be to visit her husband's cabin and John's grave.

=== Charlie ===
Charlie, portrayed by Alexa Nisenson. Sometime during the outbreak, Charlie's parents were killed, and they turned in front of her, scarring her deeply. Later, Charlie was found by Ennis and was recruited to join the Vultures. She is accountable for Nick Clark's death but understood her mistake and is forgiven and accepted by the group. Charlie often uses her skills to get into hard-to-reach places, forming a bond with Alicia Clark and Daniel Salazar in particular.

In season 7, Charlie joins Strand's Tower as part of an infiltration mission and falls in love with one of Strand's young Rangers Ali. However, while on a mission together, Charlie is exposed to a lethal dose of radiation, believed to be alpha particles from the radioactive walkers, and she develops terminal radiation sickness. Furthermore, Ali is murdered soon afterwards by Howard for his betrayal. Charlie's condition is shown to be rapidly deteriorating, leaving her bedridden soon after she first gets sick and with June and Grace predicting that she only has a few weeks left to live at most. When Daniel enters the Tower, it is his bond with the dying Charlie that helps to finally snap him out of his delusions. Daniel promises to take care of Charlie for the little time that she has left, being there for her in the way that he couldn't be for his own daughter.

In season 8, Charlie is believed by Daniel to have died due to the seven years that have passed and her illness. However, she is later revealed to be still alive and with Luciana's group of truckers. Charlie explains that, unlike June at the Tower, PADRE had what they needed to successfully treat her illness. Charlie is reunited with Madison Clark for the first time since the destruction of the Dell Diamond baseball stadium and after learning that no one had told her about Charlie's role in Nick's death, personally confesses to his murder. A furious Madison has to be restrained from attacking Charlie and sends her on a suicide mission to kill Troy Otto, but finally relents and forgives the girl after learning that Charlie had had Nick's body dug up and cremated, recognizing that Charlie had really been just a scared little girl who deserves forgiveness for her actions. However, Charlie is captured by Troy and, in order to remove Troy's leverage over Madison, commits suicide, sacrificing herself to protect PADRE. Her death devastates everyone, Daniel and Luciana in particular, who blame Madison for it.

=== Grace Mukherjee ===
Grace Mukherjee, portrayed by Karen David, is a mysterious woman who used to work at a nuclear power plant that melted down near the site where the plane of Morgan's group crashed. She eventually becomes the love interest and girlfriend of Morgan Jones, adopting baby Mo alongside him at the end of the sixth season. In season 8, Grace reveals that she is now suffering from terminal cancer due to her radiation exposure when the power plant melted down, something that she had been expecting to happen since before Grace and Morgan had ever even met. Shortly after this revelation, while helping Morgan to lay his son Duane to rest, Grace is bitten by a walker while protecting a now eight-year-old Mo. June's experimental treatment fails to work on her and, after a final emotional goodbye to Morgan over the radio, Grace tells her daughter that Mo being in their lives had given Morgan and Grace something to live for. Grace reanimates and attacks her daughter, but Morgan arrives just in time to put Grace down and save Mo. Morgan later buries Grace by Eastman's cabin, the place where Morgan had regained his sanity after losing his family, before returning to Alexandria with Mo in search of his old friends and Rick Grimes.

=== Dwight ===
Dwight, portrayed by Austin Amelio is a main character in The Walking Dead. In season 5, he made his first appearance in the spin-off Fear the Walking Dead, becoming the second character to crossover, the first being Morgan in the fourth season, Dwight was a ruthless and reluctant lieutenant member of "The Saviors", a group of people who subjugated communities (including Alexandria, Hilltop and The Kingdom), to be given food, supplies, etc. in exchange for "protection". Dwight had to do abominable things to save his wife Sherry who was held captive by Negan (the leader of the Saviors). When the communities revealed Dwight was a key piece for the victory of the rebel communities since he offered to work as a double agent helping especially Alexandria, after managing to defeat the Saviors, Dwight is forced to be exiled due to his atrocities, who repented of his actions decides to leave and go in search of his wife Sherry.

=== Sarah Rabinowitz ===
Sarah Rabinowitz, portrayed by Mo Collins, Along with their adoptive brother Wendell, they are both scammers and good at stealing from people in their path. However, it can be benevolent to those who needed help, offering food and some ways to get to their destination.

=== Wes ===
Wes portrayed by Colby Hollman, is a nihilistic painter and member of Morgan's group. Wes survived the initial stages of the outbreak with his brother, Derek. At some point Derek was killed by walkers. Months later, Wes finds Alicia and Strand, and became a member of Morgan's group after saving Janis's life. He was separated for the others by Virginia and her Pioneers, and moved for Tank Town. Following the fall of Virginia, Wes was reunited with Derek who had joined the doomsday cult. Wes was forced to kill his brother during the escape, recognizing that the Derek he had loved was long gone.

In season 7, Wes betrays the group and joins Strand's dictatorship at the Tower, becoming his partner. Now completely disillusioned with other people, Wes only cares about ensuring his own survival, mutinying against Strand and condemning his former friends to death if it means protecting his new home. Wes is finally defeated by Strand, Alicia and Daniel Salazar, but he refuses to stand down and Strand stabs him to death with a sword, much to the shock and anger of Alicia who had believed that she was getting through to Wes.

=== Dakota ===
Dakota portrayed by Zoe Colletti, is Virginia's daughter who grew up believing that she was her younger sister. Dakota hates Virginia and as such, saved Morgan Jones' life after the events of "End of the Line" as she believed that he was the only one capable of killing Virginia. Dakota subsequently murdered a man in "The Key" for which Janis was framed and executed. After her actions come to light in "The Door", Dakota murders John Dorie. Dakota's true parentage comes to light in "Things Left to Do" shortly before Virginia is killed by June who blames Virginia for Dakota's actions as she had known and protected her from any consequences. In "The Beginning", Dakota allows herself to be killed in a nuclear explosion after receiving forgiveness from John Sr. and June and killing Teddy for using her.

In season 7's "Cindy Hawkins", John Sr. finds a reanimated Dakota outside of Teddy's secret bunker when he emerges a couple of months later due to his hallucinations. Calling her another girl that he couldn't save, John Sr. sadly puts Dakota down with her own knife and tells June that he had "put Dakota out of her torment" while he was on the surface. When several walkers come at him during a subsequent trip to the surface, John grabs Dakota's knife from where he had left it impaled in her head and uses it to put down the attacking walkers.

=== Sherry ===
Sherry, portrayed by Christine Evangelista, Dwight's long-missing ex-wife, who fled to Texas from The Saviors, after a long search, Dwight managed to find her whereabouts.

=== John Dorie Sr. ===
John Dorie Sr., portrayed by Keith Carradine, is the father of John Dorie and like his son, a former lawman. He is first mentioned by John when he tells Rabbi Jacob Kessner a story about how in the 1970s when John was just a boy, his father had hunted a serial killer who he had planted evidence upon to send the man away to prison for life. The guilt of doing so caused John Sr. to become an alcoholic and abandon his family, leaving behind for his son John's two signature Colt Single Action Army revolvers. In the present, John Sr. returns after his son's death, revealing that the doomsday cult leader Teddy Maddox is the same serial killer that John Sr. had hunted down in the 1970s, having escaped from prison and resumed his mission of bringing an end to every living person on the planet. After meeting his daughter-in-law June, John Sr. joins forces with Morgan's group to finally bring an end to his old enemy. After the nuclear destruction, John Sr. takes shelter with June in Teddy's secret underground bunker. During his time in the bunker, John discovers that it is the location where Teddy had killed his victims decades before, something that John had never been able to find. John becomes obsessed with finding the body of Teddy's last victim Cindy Hawkins whom he experiences hallucinations of due to going into alcoholic withdrawal. Shortly before the bunker collapses, John finally locates her body hidden in the walls and gains peace on his failure to find her and keep his promise to her mother.

In "Sonny Boy", John reveals to June that he is dying of terminal radiation sickness, having gotten exposed while rescuing Charlie from a radioactive building despite being quick and taking precautions. Determined to ensure his legacy, John embarks upon a suicide mission to deliver baby Mo to Morgan through the Tower's walker moat, wearing a makeshift suit of armor. Although successful, John is bitten on the left shoulder in the process. Already dying and with the herd closing in, John sacrifices himself to the walkers in order to buy Morgan time to escape with the baby.

== Supporting characters ==
=== Los Angeles ===
- Art "Artie" Costa, portrayed by Scott Lawrence, is the principal at the high school where Madison and Travis work.
- Matt Sale, portrayed by Maestro Harrell, is Alicia's high school boyfriend.
- Tobias, portrayed by Lincoln A. Castellanos, is a wise-beyond-his-years high school senior.
- Calvin Jasper, portrayed by Keith Powers, is Nick's friend and a drug dealer.
- Gloria, portrayed by Lexi Johnson, is Nick's girlfriend who succumbs to an overdose at the start of the apocalypse.
- Russell, portrayed by Leon Thomas III, is one of Travis' students before the outbreak.
- Griselda Salazar, portrayed by Patricia Reyes Spíndola, is Ofelia's mother, who emigrated from El Salvador with her husband Daniel to escape political unrest. She later joins Madison's Group.
- Douglas Thompson, portrayed by John Stewart, is a stressed resident in Madison's neighbourhood.

=== The California Army National Guard ===
- Lt. Moyers, portrayed by Jamie McShane, is the leader of the National Guard contingent in charge of protecting Madison's neighborhood.
- Cpl. Andrew Adams, portrayed by Shawn Hatosy, is a well-intentioned corporal in the U.S. military with a soulful disposition, who is out of his element.
- Dr. Bethany Exner, portrayed by Sandrine Holt, is a confident and skilled doctor working with the U.S. military.
- Cpl. Cole, portrayed by Jared Abrahamson, is a sarcastic soldier in Moyer's squad.
- PFC. Richards, portrayed by Shane Dean, is a friendly soldier in Moyer's squad.
- Sgt. Castro, portrayed by Bobby Naderi, is a serious soldier in Moyer's squad.
- Sgt. Melvin Allen, portrayed by Toby Levins, is a soldier guarding the holding pens at the National Guard Compound.

=== Catrina Island ===
- George Geary, portrayed by David Warshofsky, is the stern patriarch of the Geary family.
- Melissa Geary , portrayed by Catherine Dent, is the caring matriarch of the Geary family.
- Seth Geary, portrayed by Jake Austin Walker, is George and Melissa's eldest son.
- Harry Geary, portrayed by Jeremiah Clayton & Maverick Clayton, is George and Melissa's youngest son.
- Willa Geary, portrayed by Aria Lyric Leabu, is George and Melissa's daughter.

=== Connor's Pirates ===
- Jack Kipling, portrayed by Daniel Zovatto, is a member of Connor's pirates who develops an attraction to Alicia.
- Connor, portrayed by Mark Kelly, is the captain of a group of pirates who pursue and capture the Abigail. Connor is also the older brother of Reed.
- Reed, portrayed by Jesse McCartney, is Connor's brother and a hostile member of the pirates.
- Vida, portrayed by Veronica Diaz, is a pregnant woman and one of Connor's pirates.

=== The Abigail Estate ===
- Luis Flores, portrayed by Arturo Del Puerto, is an ally and right-hand man of Victor Strand and Thomas Abigail.
- Thomas Abigail, portrayed by Dougray Scott, is Strand's boyfriend and the namesake of the boat Abigail.
- Celia Flores, portrayed by Marlene Forte, is Luis's mother and Thomas' adoptive mother who is the leader of a community of survivors at the Abigail estate.
- Sofia, portrayed by Diana Lein, is the housemaid for the Abigail Estate.

=== La Colonia ===
- Alejandro Nuñez, portrayed by Paul Calderón, is a former pharmacist and the leader of La Colonia, a community in Tijuana, Mexico, who claims to have been bitten but did not die.
- Francisco, portrayed by Alfredo Herrera, is a scout for La Colonia who has a wife and daughter.
- Reynaldo, portrayed by Cuauhtli Jiménez, is a young scout for La Colonia.

=== Los Hermanos ===
- Marco Rodriguez, portrayed by Alejandro Edda, is the leader of Los Hermanos, a drug gang that operates near La Colonia.
- Antonio Reyes, portrayed by Rubén Carbajal, is Hector's brother who left the hotel to join Los Hermanos.

=== The Rosarito Beach Hotel ===
- Elena Reyes, portrayed by Karen Bethzabe, is the former manager of the hotel.
- Hector Reyes, portrayed by Ramses Jimenez, is Elena's nephew who used to manage the hotel with her.
- Oscar Diaz, portrayed by Andres Londono, is the leader of a group of survivors from a wedding party that took place during the beginning of the apocalypse, now living at the Rosarito Beach Hotel.
- Andres Diaz, portrayed by Raul Casso, is a member of the wedding party and Oscar's brother.
- Ilene Stowe, portrayed by Brenda Strong, is a member of the wedding party and Oscar's mother-in-law.
- Charles Stowe, portrayed by David Grant Wright, is a member of the wedding party and Jessica's father seen in a flashback during the beginning of the apocalypse.
- Jessica Diaz, portrayed by Schuyler Fisk, is a member of the wedding party and Oscar's newlywed wife seen in a flashback during the beginning of the apocalypse.

=== Brandon's Group ===
- Brandon Luke, portrayed by Kelly Blatz, is the leader of a group of young men that befriend Chris.
- Derek, portrayed by Kenny Wormald, is a reckless member of Brandon's group.
- James McCallister, portrayed by Israel Broussard, is a kind member of Brandon's group.

=== Broke Jaw Ranch ===
- Blake Sarno, portrayed by Michael William Freeman, is a remorseless member of the Broke Jaw Ranch's militia.
- Willy, portrayed by Noel Fisher, is a sadistic member of the Broke Jaw Ranch's militia who executes survivors to learn more about the infection.
- Charlene Daley, portrayed by Lindsay Pulsipher, is a helicopter pilot and member of the Broke Jaw Ranch's militia.
- Pat Daley, portrayed by Sarah Benoit, is a resident of the Broke Jaw Ranch and the mother of Charlene and Dax.
- Dax Daley, portrayed by Jake B. Miller, is a resident of the Broke Jaw Ranch and Pat's son.
- Cooper, portrayed by Matt Lasky, is an honorable member of Broke Jaw Ranch's militia who befriends Madison's group.
- Gretchen Trimbol, portrayed by Rae Gray, is a resident of the Broke Jaw Ranch who becomes friends with Alicia.
- Vernon Trimbol, portrayed by Hugo Armstrong, is one of the founders of the Broke Jaw Ranch and the father of Mike and Gretchen.
- Mike Trimbol, portrayed by Justin Deeley, is a fearful member of the Broke Jaw Ranch's militia and Vernon's son.
- Terrance Shafford, portrayed by Philip Fallon, is an immature teenager and a resident of the Broke Jaw Ranch.
- Joseph, portrayed by Dominic Bogart, is a guard and member of the Broke Jaw Ranch's militia.
- Jimmie, portrayed by Nathan Sutton, is a loyal member of the Broke Jaw Ranch's militia.
- Christine, portrayed by Linda Gehringer, is an aging resident of the Broke Jaw Ranch who forms a bond with Alicia.

=== The Black Hat Reservation (The Hopi Tribe) ===
- Qaletaqa "Taqa" Walker, portrayed by Michael Greyeyes, is the Native American leader of the Hope Tribe at the Black Hat Reservation and a tribal lawyer who is at war with Jeremiah Otto, who occupies his people's lands. He later joins Madison's Group.
- Lee, also known as "Crazy Dog", portrayed by Justin Rain, is the right-hand man of Qaletaqa and a former U.S. army sniper. He later joins Madison's Group.
- Klah Jackson, portrayed by Kalani Queypo, is an aggressive member of the Black Hat Reservation.

=== The Gonzalez Dam ===
- Dante Esquivel, portrayed by Jason Manuel Olazabal, is the power-hungry leader of the Gonzalez Dam community.
- Efrain Morales, portrayed by Jesse Borrego, is the chief water distributor for the Gonzalez Dam who saves Daniel's life after he is injured by a fire.
- Everardo, portrayed by Ricardo Moreno Villa, is a kind janitor working at the Gonzalez Dam.

=== The Proctors & El Bazar ===
- Proctor John, portrayed by Ray McKinnon, is the leader of the Proctors, a motorcycle gang based in Baja California.
- Proctor Nineteen portrayed by Brian Duffy, is a high-ranking member of the Proctors at El Bazar.
- El Matarife, portrayed by Miguel Pérez, is a drug dealer who operates out of El Bazar.
- Eddie, portrayed by James Le Gros, is the doctor at El Bazar who works for the Proctors.

=== The Baseball Stadium / Cole's Group ===
- Cole, portrayed by Sebastian Sozzi, is a supply runner for the baseball stadium community and a member of Madison's Group. He later became the leader of his own group consisting of former baseball stadium residents.
- Vivian, portrayed by Rhoda Griffis, is a resident of the baseball stadium community and a member of Madison's Group. She later joins Cole's Group.
- Douglas, portrayed by Kenneth Wayne Bradley, is a resident of the baseball stadium community and Vivian's husband and a member of Madison's Group. He later joins Cole's Group.

=== The Vultures ===
- Melvin, portrayed by Kevin Zegers, is the cunning leader of the Vultures, a group of survivors who scavenge from failed communities.
- Ennis, portrayed by Evan Gamble, is Melvin's right-hand man and brother.
- Edgar, portrayed by Jason Liebrecht, is an arrogant member of The Vultures.

=== Morgan's Group / The Caravan ===
- Wendell Rabinowitz, portrayed by Daryl Mitchell, is the adoptive brother of Sarah and uses a wheelchair.
- Jim Brauer, portrayed by Aaron Stanford, is a secluded brewer who has no experience fighting the undead.
- Skidmark, portrayed by animal actor Raja Afghani, is a troublesome cat who is adopted by Daniel.
- Tess, portrayed by Peggy Schott, is a survivor who lived with her husband and son until the former's death and soon joined Morgan's Group.
- Jacob Kessner, portrayed by Peter Jacobson, is a rabbi who joins Morgan's group after being rescued from the undead.
- Morgan "Mo", also known as "Wren", portrayed by Avaya White as an infant and Zoey Merchant as a child, is the adopted daughter of Morgan and Grace, named after the former. She is later taken in and raised by PADRE.

=== C&L Freight Services (Clayton's Group) / Logan's Crew ===
- Clayton, also known as "Polar Bear", portrayed by Stephen Henderson, is the former partner of Logan who led his own group consisting of truck drivers who place supplies at mile markers for survivors in need of help.
- Logan, also known as "Desert Fox", portrayed by Matt Frewer, is the former partner of Clayton who becomes disillusioned with Clayton's vision of helping other survivors and forms his own crew.
- Doris, portrayed by Mikala Gibson, is Logan's right-hand woman.
- Rollie, portrayed by Cory Hart, is a loyal member of Logan's crew who clashes with Dwight. He later joins the Outcasts and, secretly, the Doomsday Cult.
- Dom, portrayed by Beau Smith, is a former member of Clayton's group who is the oil producer of Tank Town. He later joins Morgan's Group.

=== Camp Cackleberry (Annie's Group) ===
- Annie, portrayed by Bailey Gavulic, is a teenage survivor and Dylan and Max's older sister who leads a group of orphaned children. She later joins Morgan's Group.
- Max, portrayed by Ethan Suess, is a teenage survivor and Annie and Dylan's brother. He later joins Morgan's Group.
- Dylan, portrayed by Cooper Dodson, is Annie and Max's younger brother. He later joins Morgan's Group.

=== The Pioneers ===
- Virginia, also known as "Ginny", portrayed by Colby Minifie, is the antagonistic leader of the Pioneers, a network of several communities throughout Texas and Oklahoma, and Dakota's mother.
- Janis, portrayed by Holly Curran, is a rebellious former member of the Pioneers who is saved by Wes. She later joins Morgan's Group.
- Tom, portrayed by Joe Massingill, is Janis' brother and the former leader of the Paradise Ridge community which was taken over by the Pioneers. He later joins Morgan's Group.
- Rachel, portrayed by Brigitte Kali Canales, is a former member of the Pioneers, and the biological mother of Mo. She later joins Morgan's Group.
- Isaac, portrayed by Michael Abbott Jr., is a former member of the Pioneers, Rachel's husband and the biological father of Mo.
- Hill, portrayed by Craig Nigh, is a member of the Pioneers and Virginia's right-hand man who leads the rangers.
- Marcus, portrayed by Justin Smith, is an arrogant member of the Pioneers and one of its rangers.
- Cameron, portrayed by Noah Khyle, is a young member of the Pioneers and one of its rangers.
- Sanjay, portrayed by Satya Nikhil Polisetti, is a cowardly conscripted worker for the Pioneers.
- Samuels, portrayed by Bobbie Grace, is a member of the Pioneers and one of its rangers who works with Strand.

=== Creative Visionaries Agency (Nora's Group) ===
- Nora, portrayed by Devyn Tyler, is the leader of a group of survivors sick with the bubonic plague who are trapped inside the CVA office building. She later joins Morgan's Group.
- Lee, portrayed by Todd Terry, is a protective member of Nora's group. He later joins Morgan's Group.

=== The Doomsday Cult / The Stalkers ===
- Theodore "Teddy" Maddox, portrayed by John Glover, is the cult's leader and a serial killer who was arrested by John Dorie Sr. in the 1970s and incarcerated. Glover would later reprise his role in the Dead in the Water web series.
- Jason Riley, portrayed by Nick Stahl, is Teddy's right-hand man and a former crew member aboard the USS Pennsylvania, a submarine armed with nuclear missiles. Stahl would later reprise his role in the Dead in the Water web series, where he serves as the main protagonist.
- Derek, portrayed by Chinaza Uche, is Wes' brother who was presumed dead but had become a fanatical member of Teddy's cult.
- Sabrina, portrayed by Jessica Perrin, is a young member of Teddy's cult and later the Stalkers. She later joins Morgan's Group.
- Arnold "Arno", portrayed by Spenser Granese, is the leader of the Stalkers, a group of scavengers who are former cult members.
- Sage, portrayed by Jacob Kyle Young, is an incompetent member of the Stalkers.

=== The Tower ===
- Howard, portrayed by Omid Abtahi, is the deputy leader of the Tower and Strand's right-hand man who was a former history teacher.
- Mickey, portrayed by Aisha Tyler, is a former professional wrestler seeking her missing husband who escapes from the Tower to look for him.
- Ali, portrayed by Ashton Arbab, is a teenage survivor training to become a guard for the Tower who develops a relationship with Charlie.

=== PADRE ===
- Sam Krennick, also known as "Shrike", portrayed by Maya Eshet, is the co-leader of PADRE alongside her brother Ben, whose aim is to "rescue" children from their parents and raise them without having emotional attachments.
- Ben Krennick, also known as "Crane", portrayed by Daniel Rashid, is the co-leader of PADRE alongside his sister Sam, who disguises himself as his father "PADRE", only communicating with others in secret.
- Odessa Sanderson, also known as "Dove", portrayed by Jayla Walton, is a prefect at PADRE and a friend of Mo's. As a young child, she was taken from her mother Ava and brought to PADRE by Madison. She later joins Madison's Group.
- Finch, portrayed by Gavin Warren, is Dwight and Sherry's son who is at first unaware of his parents' true identities, having been raised at PADRE. He later joins Morgan's Group.
- "Hawk", portrayed by Triston Dye, is a high-ranking prefect at PADRE. He later joins Madison's Group.
- Major General Krennick, portrayed by Michael B. Silver, is the father of Sam and Ben and a high-ranking officer in the U.S. military who led PADRE in the early days of the apocalypse.

=== Daniel's Resistance Movement ===
- Adrian, portrayed by Jonathan Medina, is a desperate survivor whose daughter Hannah was kidnapped by PADRE, leading him to join Daniel Salazar's resistance movement, which is a militia consisting of parents whose children were taken by PADRE.
- Diane, portrayed by Jennifer Christa Palmer, is an outspoken member of Daniel's resistance, hoping to reunite with her daughter. She later joins Madison's Group.

=== The Emissary Suites Hotel ===
- Frank, portrayed by Isha Blaaker, is Strand's German husband who became trapped in the U.S. while on vacation with his son at the beginning of the apocalypse. He later joins Madison's Group.
- Klaus, portrayed by Julian Grey, is Frank's son and Strand's adopted son. He later joins Madison's Group.

=== Troy's Group ===
- Russell, portrayed by Randy Bernales, is the loyal second-in-command of Troy's Group.
- Tracy Otto, portrayed by Antonella Rose, is Troy's unruly daughter. Her mother originally rescued Troy after the Gonzalez Dam's destruction but had since died.

=== Miscellaneous survivors ===
- Jake Powell, portrayed by Brendan Meyer, is a plane crash survivor who became badly burned when Flight 462 crashed in the Pacific Ocean. Meyer reprises his role from the Flight 462 web series, where he serves as the main protagonist.
- Javier, portrayed by Jorge-Luis Pallo, is a single father who lives alone with his son until he encounters Travis and Chris.
- Gael, portrayed by Edgar Wuotto, is the leader of La Mañas, a gang of outlaws.
- William, portrayed by Ashley Zukerman, is Ofeila's ex-fiancée seen during a flashback before the apocalypse.
- Steven, portrayed by Ross McCall, is a resilient survivor who is taken prisoner by the Broke Jaw Ranch militia.
- Diana, portrayed by Edwina Findley, is a pragmatic survivor who befriends Alicia.
- Leland, portrayed by Clint James, is the leader of a group of bandits who ambush Morgan and John Dorie.
- Martha, portrayed by Tonya Pinkins, is a survivor driven insane by the loss of her husband who kills every survivor who tries to help someone else, believing it makes them weak.
- Hank, portrayed by John Eric Bentley, is the loving husband of Martha seen in a flashback regarding the origin of Martha's insanity.
- Quinn, portrayed by Charles Harrelson, is a lonely survivor who has a run-in with Althea and June.
- Isabelle Russo, portrayed by Sydney Lemmon, is a helicopter pilot working for the mysterious organization known as the Civic Republic Military (CRM) who develops a relationship with Althea.
- Charles, portrayed by Charlie Bodin, is an affable survivor living in a shopping mall who radios Morgan's Group asking for help.
- Emile LaRoux, portrayed by Demetrius Grosse, is a bounty hunter hired by Virginia to hunt down Morgan.
- Rufus, portrayed by animal actor Wyatt, is Emile and Josiah's loyal pet hunting dog. He later joins Morgan's Group.
- Walter Schowski, portrayed by Damon Carney, is a fugitive on the run from Emile. Carney would later reprise his role in the Dead in the Water web series as a surviving crewmember of the USS Pennsylvania.
- Oswald, portrayed by Andres Munar, is an untrusting member of the Outcasts, a group of survivors who were considered not good enough to join the Pioneers.
- Ed, portrayed by Raphael Sbarge, is a taxidermist who lives in an old hunting lodge where he augments walkers to protect himself.
- Athena Mukherjee, portrayed by Sahana Srinivasan, is a hallucinated version of Grace's daughter seen during a dream sequence about a hopeful future for Morgan's Group.
- Will, portrayed by Gus Halper, is a resourceful survivor who befriended Alicia during her time trapped in the Franklin Hotel bunker before escaping alone.
- Fred, portrayed by Derek Richardson, is an unstable survivor suffering from radiation sickness who was badly burned by nuclear fallout.
- Bea, portrayed by Maren Lord, is an unhinged survivor suffering from radiation sickness and Fred's wife who steals Mo to replace her own deceased infant daughter.
- Josiah LaRoux, portrayed by Demetrius Grosse, is Emile's identical twin brother who seeks revenge upon Morgan for Emile's death. He later joins Morgan's Group.
- Eli, portrayed by Alex Skuby, is a sadistic survivor hired by Strand to kill people living outside the Tower.
- Paul, portrayed by Warren Snipe, is a compassionate musician who became deaf when the nuclear missiles were set off in Texas.
- Maya Vazquez, portrayed by Candice Michele Barley, is a determined survivor who radios Dwight and Sherry seeking her missing son. She later joins Morgan's Group.
- Ava Sanderson, portrayed by Lyndon Smith, is a hardened survivor who hopes to rescue her daughter, Odessa, who was taken by PADRE.
- Wilt, portrayed by Carl Palmer, is the leader of a small posse of survivors whose children have been kidnapped by PADRE.
- Jenny Jones, portrayed by Keisha Tillis, is the deceased wife of Morgan Jones, who he hallucinates while in his hometown of King County. Tillis reprises her role from The Walking Dead.
- Jay, portrayed by Jack Mikesell, is a diabetic survivor who encounters Dwight while seeking his stolen insulin.
- Marty, portrayed by Alex Morf, is the leader of a group of survivors who have occupied the Sanctuary, the former home of the Saviors on The Walking Dead.
- Ada, portrayed by Nona Parker Johnson, is the leader of a group of survivors who were previously rescued by Alicia in Texas. She and her group masquerade as Alicia by dressing like her to continue her legacy.
