= The Unveiling (Fear the Walking Dead) =

- Fear the Walking Dead episode
- Episode no.: Season 3 Episode 7
- Directed by: Jeremy Webb
- Written by: Mark Richard
- Original air date: July 9, 2017
- Running time: 43 minutes

Guest appearances
- Michael Greyeyes as Qaletaqa Walker; Michael William Freeman as Blake Sarno; Justin Rain as Lee

Episode chronology
← Previous "Red Dirt"	Next → "Children of Wrath"
- Fear the Walking Dead (season 3)

"The Unveiling" is the seventh episode of the third season of the post-apocalyptic horror television series Fear the Walking Dead, which aired on AMC on July 9, 2017 along with the mid-season finale "Children of Wrath".

This episode features the return of Mercedes Mason as Ofelia Salazar who had been absent since the season 2 penultimate episode "Wrath".

== Plot ==
Jake and Alicia arrive at Black Hat, where Alicia discovers Ofelia to be alive and allied with Walker's tribe. Jake and Walker agree to a parley with an exchange of hostages to guarantee the truce; Alicia remains at Black Hat while Jake returns to Broke Jaw with Ofelia. While at Black Hat, Alicia learns that Walker's people have a water shortage and a prophecy of the apocalypse, seeing it as a sign to reclaim their former lands. Madison blackmails Troy to lead a team to rescue Alicia from Black Hat, breaking the truce and killing several of Walker's men. Jake attempts to mend ways by delivering Ofelia and a truckload of water, but he is beaten and nearly scalped. Later, Ofelia arrives at Broke Jaw, seemingly cast out. A crippling illness suddenly strikes the community and many of the militia die and reanimate as walkers, massacring the residents; Nick sees Ofelia running and realizes she was responsible before he also falls sick.

== Reception ==
"The Unveiling", along with the mid-season finale "Children of Wrath", received positive reviews from critics. On Rotten Tomatoes, "The Unveiling" garnered a 75% rating, with an average score of 7.52/10 based on 8 reviews.

In a joint review along with the mid-season finale "Children of Wrath", Matt Fowler of IGN gave "The Unveiling" an 8.6/10.0 rating, stating; "Fear the Walking Dead took us out of this half season with a tense and suspenseful one-two punch that brought back Ofelia while also resolving the calamitous conflict over the ranch in a meaningful manner."

=== Ratings ===
"The Unveiling" was seen by 2.62 million viewers in the United States on its original air date, above the previous episodes rating of 2.19 million.
