= Takeover (2026 film) =

- Release poster
- Directed by: Greg Jonkajtys
- Written by: Jeb Stuart; Brandon M. Easton
- Produced by: Taylor Church; L.C. Crowley; Patrick Sheedy
- Starring: Quavo; Billy Zane; Serayah; LaMonica Garrett; Martin Sensmeier
- Cinematography: James Kwan
- Edited by: Charlie Porter
- Music by: Matthew Head
- Production companies: Quality Control; Trioscope Studios
- Distributed by: Firestorm Entertainment
- Release date: May 8, 2026
- Country: United States
- Language: English

Takeover is a 2026 American action thriller film directed by Greg Jonkajtys and starring Quavo and Billy Zane.

== Premise ==
The film follows Guy Miller, a recent parolee drawn into the street racing scene in Atlanta. Miller is then coerced by international thief Gamal Akopyan to execute a high-stakes diamond heist.

== Cast ==
- Quavo as Guy Miller
- Billy Zane as Gamal Akopyan
- Serayah as Lt. Keisha Jenner
- LaMonica Garrett as Sheriff ‘Herc’ Hitchens
- Martin Sensmeier as Hilario
- Arrianna Marie as Natali
- Alex Livinalli as Francisco

== Production ==
In August 2022, it was announced that Quavo and Billy Zane were cast in the film. In September 2022, it was announced that Serayah joined the cast of the film. Later that same month, it was announced that LaMonica Garrett and Martin Sensmeier were added to the cast.

Filming began in September 2022 and occurred in Atlanta.

Post-production on the film was handled by Trioscope Studios and CheckpointVFX.

In April 2025, sales agency 13 Films acquired the film and was screened at the 2025 Cannes Film Festival.

== Release ==
Takeover was released in the United States on May 8, 2026.
