= Wind River: The Next Chapter =

Upcoming film by Kari Skogland

- Directed by: Kari Skogland
- Screenplay by: Patrick Massett; John Zinman
- Story by: Matthew George; Patrick Massett; John Zinman
- Produced by: Matthew George; Basil Iwanyk; Erica Lee
- Starring: Martin Sensmeier; Gil Birmingham; Jason Clarke; Scott Eastwood; Chaske Spencer; Alan Ruck; Kali Reis; Tatanka Means
- Production companies: Castle Rock Entertainment; Acacia Entertainment; Thunder Road Films; STX Entertainment
- Country: United States
- Language: English

Wind River: The Next Chapter is an upcoming American neo-Western crime film directed by Kari Skogland and written by Patrick Massett and John Zinman. Serving as a sequel to Wind River (2017), the film stars Martin Sensmeier, Gil Birmingham, Jason Clarke, Scott Eastwood, Chaske Spencer, Alan Ruck, Kali Reis, and Tatanka Means.

== Premise ==
The FBI enlists the aid of Chip Hanson, a newly minted tracker for the U.S. Fish & Wildlife Service, to solve a series of ritualistic murders on the reservation he calls home.

== Cast ==
- Martin Sensmeier as Chip Hanson
- Gil Birmingham as Martin Hanson
- Jason Clarke
- Scott Eastwood
- Chaske Spencer
- Alan Ruck
- Kali Reis
- Tatanka Means

== Production ==
In November 2022, Kari Skogland signed on to direct a sequel to Wind River (2017) from a screenplay by Patrick Massett and John Zinman. The film, titled Wind River: The Next Chapter, stars Martin Sensmeier (reprising his role from the 2017 film). In early March 2023, additional cast members were revealed, including Jason Clarke, Scott Eastwood, Chaske Spencer, Gil Birmingham (reprising his role from the first film), Alan Ruck, Kali Reis, and Tatanka Means.

Principal photography was originally set to begin in January 2023, and ultimately began on March 15, 2023 in Calgary, Canada, and in the village of Beiseker.

== Release ==
In January 2025, Reis indicated that she was unaware of the status of the film. In October 2025, Clarke revealed that the film had wrapped up post-production.
