= The Liberator (miniseries) =

2020 American war drama TV miniseries

- Genre: War drama
- Created by: Jeb Stuart
- Based on: The Liberator: One World War II Soldier's 500-Day Odyssey by Alex Kershaw
- Written by: Jeb Stuart
- Directed by: Greg Jonkajtys
- Starring: Bradley James; Jose Miguel Vasquez; Martin Sensmeier
- Narrated by: Mike Rowe
- Opening theme: "July 10, 1943" by Jason Todd Shannon
- Composers: Mikolai Stroinski; Jason Todd Shannon; Benjamin Scott Holst
- Country of origin: United States
- Original language: English
- No. of episodes: 4

Production
- Executive producers: Jeb Stuart; A&E Studios: Barry Jossen; Unique Features: Michael Lynne; Bob Shaye; Sarah Victor; Trioscope Studios: L.C. Crowley; Grzegorz Jonkajtys; Brandon Barr; Mark Apen
- Producers: Alex Kershaw; Łukasz Dzięcioł; Natalia Lasota
- Editor: Akın Özçelik
- Running time: 45–56 minutes
- Production companies: A&E Studios; Unique Features; Trioscope Studios

Original release
- Network: Netflix
- Release: November 11, 2020

The Liberator is an American adult animated war drama television mini-series created and written by Jeb Stuart. It is based on the book The Liberator: One World War II Soldier’s 500-Day Odyssey by Alex Kershaw.

Directed by Greg Jonkajtys, the miniseries was released on November 11, 2020, on Netflix.

== Synopsis ==
The Liberator takes place during World War II where maverick U.S. Army officer Felix Sparks and the 157th Infantry Regiment fought for over five hundred days alongside the Allied forces during the Italian campaign.

The Liberator is a character-driven action miniseries based on the true story of World War II infantry commander Felix "Shotgun" Sparks, who led the members of the 157th Infantry Regiment of the 45th Infantry Division, an integrated group of white cowboys, Mexican Americans and Native soldiers drawn from across the west. Sparks and his battalion of "Thunderbirds" were classic citizen soldiers, and for over 500 days they led a special group of American soldiers from Italy to France to the liberation of the Dachau concentration camp, through some of the most grueling battles of the war, becoming one of the most decorated American combat units of World War II. The unit received eight combat awards for service in Italy, France, Germany and Central Europe

== Cast ==
- Bradley James as Felix Sparks
- Martin Sensmeier as Samuel Coldfoot
- Jose Miguel Vasquez as Able Gomez
- Forrest Goodluck as Private Cloudfeather
- Bryan Hibbard as Corporal Hallowell
- Matt Mercurio as Private Cordosa
- Pedro Leandro as Private Garcia
- Billy Rayner as Jim Taylor
- Billy Breed as Private Vacarro
- Tatanka Means as Private Otaktay
- Kiowa Gordon as Corporal Kanuna
- Michael Shaeffer as Pop Bullock
- Sam Gittins as Junior Bullock
- Ross Anderson as Major Scott
- Finney Cassidy as Michigan
- David Shields as Colonel Avery
- Jacob Collins-Levy as Corporal Tucker
- David Elliot as Major General Robert T. Frederick

== Episodes ==
No.	Title	Directed by	Written by	Original release date
1	"Why We Fight"	Greg Jonkajtys	Jeb Stuart	November 11, 2020
The Thunderbirds' time in Salerno hits some very big bumps, particularly for Capt. Sparks, whose early days as the unit's commander are also explored.
2	"One Word: Anzio"	Greg Jonkajtys	Jeb Stuart	November 11, 2020
With their flank exposed, the Thunderbirds face a brutal standoff with the Germans while defending Anzio. Sparks faces discipline for his actions.
3	"The Enemy"	Greg Jonkajtys	Jeb Stuart	November 11, 2020
A rebuilt E Company, with now-Major Sparks, ships off to France. Initially it's a welcome break, but it soon brings another impossible mission. Sparks receives high honors.
4	"Home"	Greg Jonkajtys	Jeb Stuart	November 11, 2020
As the Allies close in on increasingly desperate German forces, now-Lieutenant Colonel Sparks and the Thunderbirds bear witness to the atrocities of their enemy, and their fellow troops.

== Production ==
Announced in November 2018, the miniseries's production was handled by A&E Studios and Unique Features with animation services by Atlanta-based studio School of Humans. In January 2019, Bradley James was cast in the leading role of Felix Sparks and Martin Sensmeier was cast as Samuel Coldfoot.

Filmed primarily in Łódź, Poland, some additional scenes were filmed in Atlanta.

The animation team behind the series launched Trioscope Studios, with the show as its first series in production. The miniseries was the first to use Trioscope Enhanced Hybrid Animation, a technique that blends live-action actors with CGI, similar to Rotoscoping technology. In a November 2020 interview, Trioscope chief content officer Brandon Barr stated that the project had been "particularly challenging", while arguing that anime opened the door for other visual techniques and styles.

== Release ==
The limited series was released on Veterans Day, November 11, 2020.

== Reception ==
On the review aggregator website Rotten Tomatoes, 69% of 13 critics' reviews are positive, with an average rating of 7.3/10. The website's consensus reads: "The Liberator's eccentric animation gives it some creative gloss, but clichéd storytelling and stock characters keep this World War II tale from being wholly salute-worthy." Metacritic, which uses a weighted average, assigned the miniseries a score of 59 out of 100, based on 7 critics, indicating "mixed or average reviews".

Reviewing the miniseries for Rolling Stone, Alan Sepinwall gave it 3.5 out of 5 stars and said, "The Liberator more often than not is an effective reminder about why pop culture keeps revisiting World War II material again and again." On contrast, Daniel Fienberg of The Hollywood Reporter called the show a series which is "very watchable" but is infuriating due to its "inconsistent focus and narrative choices" even though his interest never wavered due to the interesting and "eye-popping" animation. Fienberg concluded that people should check out the show for the animation, for a commemoration of Veterans Days but to be prepared for frustration over "how much more complicated, and how much richer" the actual history is and how the show could have been better.
