= Outbreak (Under the Dome) =

- Under the Dome episode
- Episode no.: Season 1 Episode 4
- Directed by: Kari Skogland
- Written by: Peter Calloway
- Original air date: July 15, 2013

Guest appearances
- Celia Weston as Mrs. Moore; Crystal Martinez as Nurse Adams; Elena Varela as Townsperson; Dane Northcutt as Neighbor; Robin Dale Robertson as Mr. Cunningham; Ben P. Jensen as ND Townsperson

Episode chronology
← Previous "Manhunt"	Next → "Blue on Blue"
- Under the Dome (season 1)

"Outbreak" is the fourth episode of the CBS drama Under the Dome. The episode originally aired on July 15, 2013.

== Plot ==
After Julia learns that Phil and Barbie are connected to her husband Peter, she questions Phil about Peter’s whereabouts, but he passes out from an unexpected illness. As other townspeople, including Linda, begin to display similar symptoms, Alice volunteers her help at the clinic and discerns the town is suffering from an outbreak of meningitis. Junior enforces a quarantine of the clinic and pacifies the panicked patients attempting to break out, which impresses Linda enough to designate him as a deputy.

With a waning supply of antibiotics, Big Jim and Barbie head to the pharmacy but discover Reverend Coggins had already taken all the medicine, believing it was God’s plan for the infected to die. Big Jim retrieves the antibiotics to treat the diseased while Barbie tracks down Julia at the cabin where she had followed leads to uncover documentation of Peter’s bankruptcy. When Barbie confesses, he was visiting Chester’s Mill as an enforcer for Phil and Peter’s gambling debts, Julia lashes out at him for lying to her.

Meanwhile, Joe and Norrie experiment with their simultaneous seizures while Big Jim finds Angie in the underground shelter.

== Reception ==
=== Ratings ===
A total of 11.13 million American viewers watched the episode, gaining a 2.7/8 rating/share among adults 18-49, and placing first in its timeslot and for the night. This episode saw a gain in viewers compared to the previous episode, which was watched by 10.71 million viewers, but tied with adults 18-49.

In Canada, the episode drew 1.784 million viewers, placing second for the week behind The Amazing Race Canada.

=== Critical reception ===
The episode received mixed reviews from critics. Andrea Reiher of Zap2it reacted positively to the episode, saying "We're really enjoying watching the show veer away from the book in some big ways. Whereas in the book, Big Jim more or less forces untrained deputies on the police department in the form of his son and his son's meathead, rapist friends, on the show it's Linda who starts down that path."

Darren Franich of Entertainment Weekly gave the episode a more mixed review, focusing on the show's continuity issues, saying "I actually wonder if, weirdly, Under the Dome could use less serialization. One of the show's clear influences is The Prisoner, the incredible late-60s British series about a spy known as Number Six trapped in a mysterious village. [It] is one of the craziest shows in TV history, and part of what makes it especially interesting to watch nowadays is that it's utterly uninterested in continuity. Events in one episode almost never carry over to the next episode...But even though The Prisoner doesn't really have any narrative continuity, it does have conceptual continuity...I imagine that the makers of Under the Dome wish they could untether themselves a little bit." He did react positively to Junior's scenes in the episode, saying "The most intriguing part of last night's episode came when Junior gave a speech to the soon-to-be marauding townspeople. He mentioned his dead mother and he mentioned cornbread and he said they were all in this together; then he put down his shotgun, and everyone stopped marauding. There's a germ of a good idea there – Junior, Violent Crazy Person, is a rhetorical pacifist – but it was reduced to a non sequitur single scene, mixed in with the ongoing (boring) tales of Julia Shumway investigating her husband's disappearance and the Pink Star Seizures." He also commented positively on the cliffhanger, saying it "marked the first time that any plot on Under the Dome has moved forward since the season premiere, making me just a bit excited about next week's episode."
