= Avengers: Doomsday =

Upcoming Marvel Studios film

- Teaser poster
- Directed by: Anthony Russo; Joe Russo
- Written by: Stephen McFeely; Michael Waldron
- Based on: Avengers by: Stan Lee; Jack Kirby
- Produced by: Kevin Feige; Louis D'Esposito; Jonathan Schwartz
- Starring: Robert Downey Jr.; Chris Evans; Chris Hemsworth; Pedro Pascal; Paul Rudd; Anthony Mackie; Florence Pugh; Vanessa Kirby; Ebon Moss-Bachrach; Wyatt Russell; Channing Tatum; Simu Liu; Hayley Atwell; Tom Hiddleston; James Marsden; Joseph Quinn; Sebastian Stan; David Harbour; Letitia Wright; Lewis Pullman; Kelsey Grammer; Kathryn Newton; Danny Ramirez; Winston Duke; Alan Cumming; Hannah John-Kamen; Rebecca Romijn; Tenoch Huerta Mejía; Mabel Cadena; Alex Livinalli; Ian McKellen; Patrick Stewart
- Cinematography: Newton Thomas Sigel
- Edited by: Jeffrey Ford; Matthew Schmidt
- Music by: Alan Silvestri
- Production company: Marvel Studios
- Distributed by: Walt Disney Studios Motion Pictures
- Release date: December 18, 2026
- Running time: 150 minutes; 151 minutes (Infinity Vision)
- Country: United States
- Language: English

Avengers: Doomsday is an upcoming American superhero film based on the Marvel Comics superhero team the Avengers. Produced by Marvel Studios and distributed by Walt Disney Studios Motion Pictures, it is intended to be the sequel to Avengers: Endgame (2019) and the 39th film in the Marvel Cinematic Universe (MCU). Directed by Anthony and Joe Russo, and written by Stephen McFeely and Michael Waldron, the film features an ensemble cast led by Robert Downey Jr. as Doctor Doom. In the film, the Avengers, Wakandans, New Avengers, Fantastic Four, and the X-Men converge from different universes to face Doom amidst the collapse of the multiverse.

Two new Avengers films, The Kang Dynasty and Secret Wars, were announced in July 2022 as the conclusion of the MCU's Phase Six and "The Multiverse Saga". Jonathan Majors was set to reprise his MCU role as the villain Kang the Conqueror, with Destin Daniel Cretton and Jeff Loveness hired to direct and write The Kang Dynasty, respectively. In November 2023, Cretton departed, Waldron replaced Loveness as writer, and Marvel was considering moving away from the Kang storyline, in part due to Majors's legal issues; Majors was fired the following month. The return of the Russo brothers as directors and McFeely as co-writer, the casting of Downey as new villain Doctor Doom, and the new subtitle Doomsday were all announced in July 2024. The large cast features actors from previous MCU media and 20th Century Fox's X-Men film series, using the idea of colliding universes to bring together actors from different franchises. Filming took place from April to September 2025 at Pinewood Studios in England, with location filming in England and Bahrain.

Avengers: Doomsday is scheduled to be released in the United States on December 18, 2026, as part of Phase Six of the MCU. The sequel, Avengers: Secret Wars, is set to be released on December 17, 2027.

== Premise ==
Fourteen months after the events of Thunderbolts* (2025), amidst the collapse of the multiverse, groups of heroes from three different universes—the Avengers, Wakandans, and New Avengers from Earth-616; the Fantastic Four from Earth-828; and the X-Men from Earth-10005—converge to face the existential threat of Doctor Doom.

== Cast ==
- Robert Downey Jr. as Victor von Doom / Doctor Doom:
  The ruler of the Eastern European country Latveria who wields dark magic. Producer Kevin Feige said Doom was not an alternate universe "variant" of Downey's previous Marvel Cinematic Universe (MCU) character, the hero Tony Stark / Iron Man. Downey described Doom as a master manipulator, and said he had a "glorious time" once he embraced being a villain in a similar way to Michael Douglas's character in the film Falling Down (1993) realizing that he is "the bad guy". Directors Anthony and Joe Russo said Doom was Gothic and more ego-driven than the Infinity Saga's antagonist Thanos, and "profoundly damaged" by the trauma of losing a child. Downey contributed costume ideas and developed his own backstory as reference for his performance. While initially hesitant about using an Eastern European accent, he found a voice that worked for the character while recording a manifesto speech he wrote. Because Doom wears a mask throughout the film, Downey focused on conveying emotions with his eyes.
- Chris Evans as Steve Rogers:
  The former leader of the Avengers, a super soldier, and World War II veteran who was the first person to carry the Captain America mantle. He returned to the 1940s at the end of the film Avengers: Endgame (2019) to live with Peggy Carter. After that "definitive ending", Evans said he would only return to the MCU if there was a good reason. He believed the story for Doomsday had a "very real reason that these heroes need Steve Rogers ‌now". Evans and Mackie indicated that Rogers would take on the Nomad mantle, similar to the comics.
- Chris Hemsworth as Thor:
  The Asgardian god of thunder and a founding Avenger, based on the Norse mythological deity Thor. The character returns to the warrior-like persona and mindset last seen in the film Avengers: Infinity War (2018), with Joe Russo explaining that Thor seeks to "achieve meaning through battle".
- Pedro Pascal as Reed Richards / Mister Fantastic:
  A highly intelligent scientist and the leader of the Fantastic Four who can stretch any part of his body to great lengths. Pascal said Reed and Doom are "bonded in a lot of different ways", including as fellow scientists.
- Paul Rudd as Scott Lang / Ant-Man: An Avenger and former petty criminal with a suit that allows him to shrink or grow in scale while increasing in strength
- Anthony Mackie as Sam Wilson / Captain America:
  An Avenger and former pararescueman who was trained by the military in aerial combat using a specially designed wing pack, and who has assembled a new team of Avengers in Doomsday
- Florence Pugh as Yelena Belova / Black Widow:
  A member of the New Avengers who was trained in the Red Room as a Black Widow assassin. Feige said Doomsday would be "anchored" by Belova.
- Vanessa Kirby as Sue Storm / Invisible Woman: Reed's wife and a member of the Fantastic Four who can generate force fields and turn invisible
- Ebon Moss-Bachrach as Ben Grimm / The Thing:
  Reed's best friend and a member of the Fantastic Four whose skin has been transformed into a layer of orange rock, granting him superhuman strength and durability
- Wyatt Russell as John Walker / U.S. Agent: A member of the New Avengers who is an enhanced super soldier and a former Captain America
- Channing Tatum as Remy LeBeau / Gambit:
  A mutant with the ability to charge objects with kinetic energy, causing them to explode on impact. After using a thick, unintelligible Cajun accent for the character as part of a running joke in the film Deadpool & Wolverine (2024), Tatum said he would not "go full Cajun" in Doomsday, with the Russo brothers wanting the film to have a more dramatic and serious tone. Tatum later clarified that while Gambit would still have a Cajun accent, he would be speaking less Cajun French. Feige said the character in Doomsday is "fully-rounded" compared to his role in Deadpool & Wolverine.
- Simu Liu as Xu Shang-Chi:
  An Avenger who wields the mystical Ten Rings and is a highly skilled martial artist, trained to be an assassin by his criminal father Xu Wenwu from whom he inherited the rings. Liu said Shang-Chi in Doomsday is older, more self-assured, and "a little more lived in with who he is and his responsibilities" compared to his introduction in the film Shang-Chi and the Legend of the Ten Rings (2021).
- Hayley Atwell as Peggy Carter: A military agent with the Strategic Scientific Reserve (SSR) who is the love interest of Steve Rogers and a founder of S.H.I.E.L.D.
- Tom Hiddleston as Loki:
  The Asgardian god of mischief and Thor's adopted brother, based on the Norse mythological deity Loki. This version of the character was explored in the series Loki (2021–2023), where he became the God of Stories and a guardian of the multiverse at the End of Time. Hiddleston said that was the starting point for his role in Doomsday.
- James Marsden as Scott Summers / Cyclops:
  A mutant and the leader of the X-Men who can emit powerful optic energy beams that he controls with a special visor
- Joseph Quinn as Johnny Storm / Human Torch: Sue's younger brother and a member of the Fantastic Four who can control fire and fly
- Sebastian Stan as Bucky Barnes / Winter Soldier: An enhanced super soldier with a cybernetic arm who is the de facto leader of the New Avengers
- David Harbour as Alexei Shostakov / Red Guardian:
  A member of the New Avengers who is the Russian super soldier counterpart to Captain America and a father figure to Yelena. Harbour said the relationship between Shostakov and Yelena is changed by the events of Doomsday.
- Letitia Wright as Shuri / Black Panther:
  The former princess of Wakanda who gained superhuman abilities by ingesting the heart-shaped herb. After taking on the mantle of Black Panther in the film Black Panther: Wakanda Forever (2022), Wright said Shuri has now fully assumed that role and has taken a leadership position.
- Lewis Pullman as Bob Reynolds / Sentry:
  A superpowered member of the New Avengers who possesses a dark alter ego known as the Void and is believed to be stronger than all the Avengers combined
- Kelsey Grammer as Hank McCoy / Beast: A highly intelligent mutant and member of the X-Men with animalistic physical characteristics, including blue fur, pointed ears, fangs, and claws
- Kathryn Newton as Cassie Lang: Scott Lang's daughter who wears a size-altering suit similar to his
- Danny Ramirez as Joaquin Torres / Falcon: An Avenger and first lieutenant in the U.S. Air Force who uses a wing pack similar to Wilson's
- Winston Duke as M'Baku: A powerful warrior and the king of Wakanda
- Alan Cumming as Kurt Wagner / Nightcrawler:
  A blue-skinned, demonic-looking mutant who can teleport. Cumming said the make-up process was reduced to an hour-and-a-half for Doomsday from the four-and-a-half to five hours it took on the 20th Century Fox film X2 (2003), in large part because the character's tattoos were no longer applied individually by hand. He found working on Doomsday to be "healing" following his "miserable" experience working on X2.
- Hannah John-Kamen as Ava Starr / Ghost: A member of the New Avengers who can phase through objects
- Rebecca Romijn as Raven Darkhölme / Mystique:
  A blue-skinned, shapeshifting mutant. Romijn's make-up process was faster for Doomsday than it had been for Fox's X-Men film series, but she lamented the lost time because she had used the longer process time to get into the angry headspace to play Mystique.
- Tenoch Huerta Mejía as Namor: The king of Talokan and a powerful mutant with pointed ears and wings on his ankles who is capable of breathing both on land and underwater
- Mabel Cadena as Namora: A Talokanil warrior who is Namor's cousin and right-hand woman
- Alex Livinalli as Attuma: A Talokanil warrior and close ally of Namor
- Ian McKellen as Erik Lehnsherr / Magneto: A powerful mutant who can generate and control magnetic fields
- Patrick Stewart as Charles Xavier / Professor X:
  A telepathic mutant and the founder of the X-Men who is paralyzed and uses a wheelchair. Doomsday marks Stewart's final on-screen performance following his death in October 2026.

Additionally, India Rose Hemsworth reprises her MCU role as Thor's adopted daughter Love, while Wesley Holloway and Sandra Hüller have been cast in undisclosed roles, with Hüller making a cameo appearance. Characters set to appear include H.E.R.B.I.E., the Fantastic Four's robot companion; Franklin Richards, Reed and Sue's superpowered son; the Sentinels, large mutant-hunting robots; and Latverian witches.

Several MCU actors filmed scenes during the production of Doomsday that were attached to the Encore (2026) re-release of Endgame and the miniseries VisionQuest (2026) as mid-credits scenes, which some observers interpreted as confirmation that they would also be in Doomsday. These include Mark Ruffalo as Bruce Banner / Hulk; Owen Wilson as Mobius M. Mobius, Ke Huy Quan as Ouroboros, Eugene Cordero as Casey, James Dryden as Ralph, and Tara Strong as the voice of Miss Minutes, all members of the Time Variance Authority (TVA); and Elizabeth Olsen as Wanda Maximoff / Scarlet Witch. The Russos declined to confirm whether Ruffalo would appear in the film, but said Banner was "involved in the story that revolves around Doom".

Following conflicting reports on whether Ryan Reynolds would appear in the film, he and Hugh Jackman made promotional appearances for Doomsday which some observers saw as confirmation that they would be in it. Reynolds and Jackman portrayed Wade Wilson / Deadpool and Logan / Wolverine, respectively, in the X-Men films and Deadpool & Wolverine. They both received credit for writing "Additional Literary Material" for the film, which was interpreted as indication that they provided dialogue for their own appearances. Additional actors reported to appear include Benedict Cumberbatch as Dr. Stephen Strange and Tom Holland as Peter Parker / Spider-Man.

== Production ==
After directing the Marvel Cinematic Universe (MCU) crossover films Avengers: Infinity War (2018) and Avengers: Endgame (2019), Anthony and Joe Russo expressed interest in directing a Secret Wars film based on the 1984–85 comic book crossover event written by Jim Shooter and the 2015–16 comic book storyline written by Jonathan Hickman. Both follow various Marvel characters who converge on the planet Battleworld. Infinity War and Endgame writers Christopher Markus and Stephen McFeely said they would return to write such a film if the Russo brothers were directing it.

At San Diego Comic-Con (SDCC) in July 2022, Marvel Studios president Kevin Feige announced the films Avengers: The Kang Dynasty and Avengers: Secret Wars, to be released on May 2, 2025, and November 7, 2025, respectively. They were set to conclude "The Multiverse Saga", which covers Phases Four, Five, and Six of the MCU. The Kang Dynasty was inspired by a 2001–02 comic book storyline written by Kurt Busiek in which Kang the Conqueror travels through time to enslave humanity. Jonathan Majors was cast as Kang for several Phase Four projects, and was confirmed to be starring in both new Avengers films. Destin Daniel Cretton was hired to direct The Kang Dynasty, with Jeff Loveness writing the script, and Michael Waldron writing Secret Wars. Following Majors's arrest in March 2023 and subsequent assault allegations, reports and speculation emerged about his future in the MCU. Loveness was no longer involved by the start of the 2023 Writers Guild of America strike in May, reportedly because Marvel was "moving away" from the Kang storyline. In June, the release dates for The Kang Dynasty and Secret Wars were pushed back to May 1, 2026, and May 7, 2027, respectively, in part due to the scripts not being ready before the strike. Cretton stepped down as director of The Kang Dynasty in November 2023, and Waldron was set to rewrite the film. The next month, Majors was fired by Disney and Marvel Studios after he was found guilty of harassment and reckless assault in the third degree. The studio had started referring to The Kang Dynasty internally as Avengers 5. By February 2024, both Avengers 5 and Secret Wars were being rewritten to minimize Kang's role or remove him entirely.

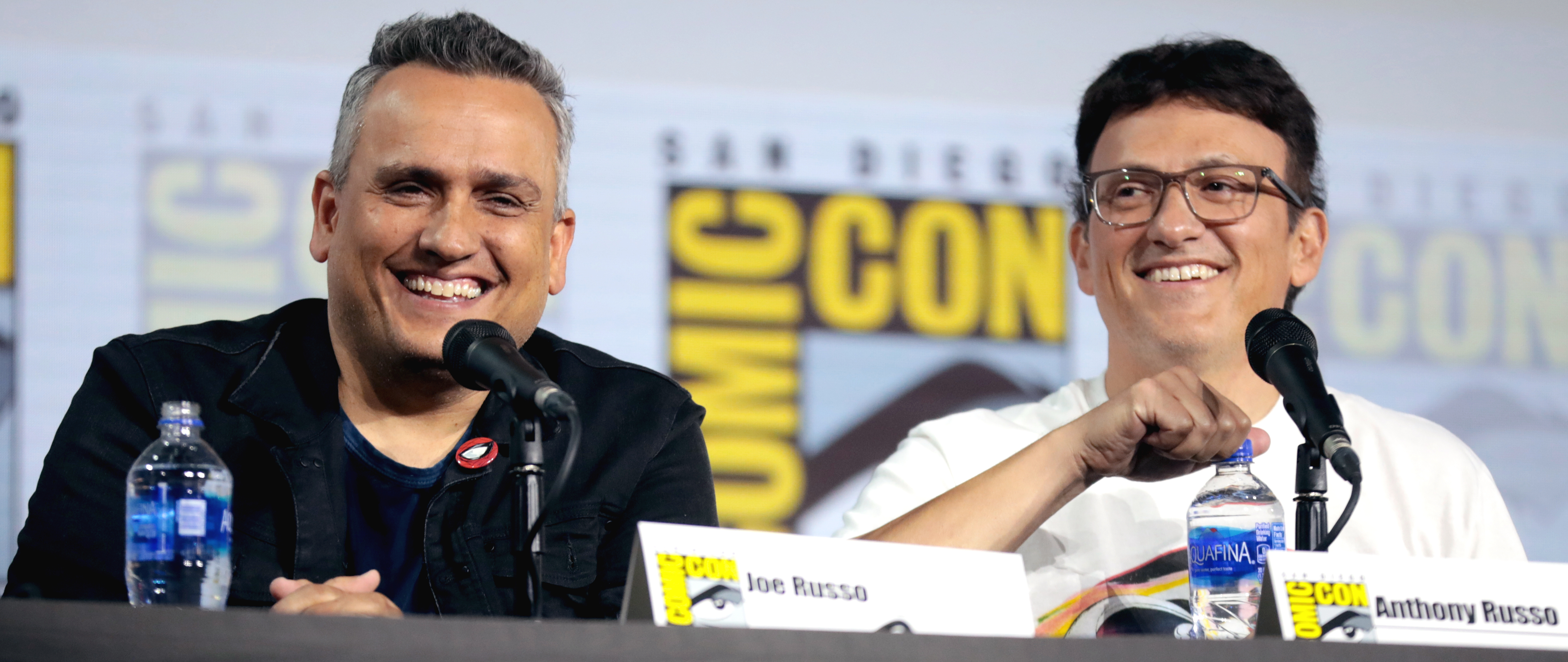
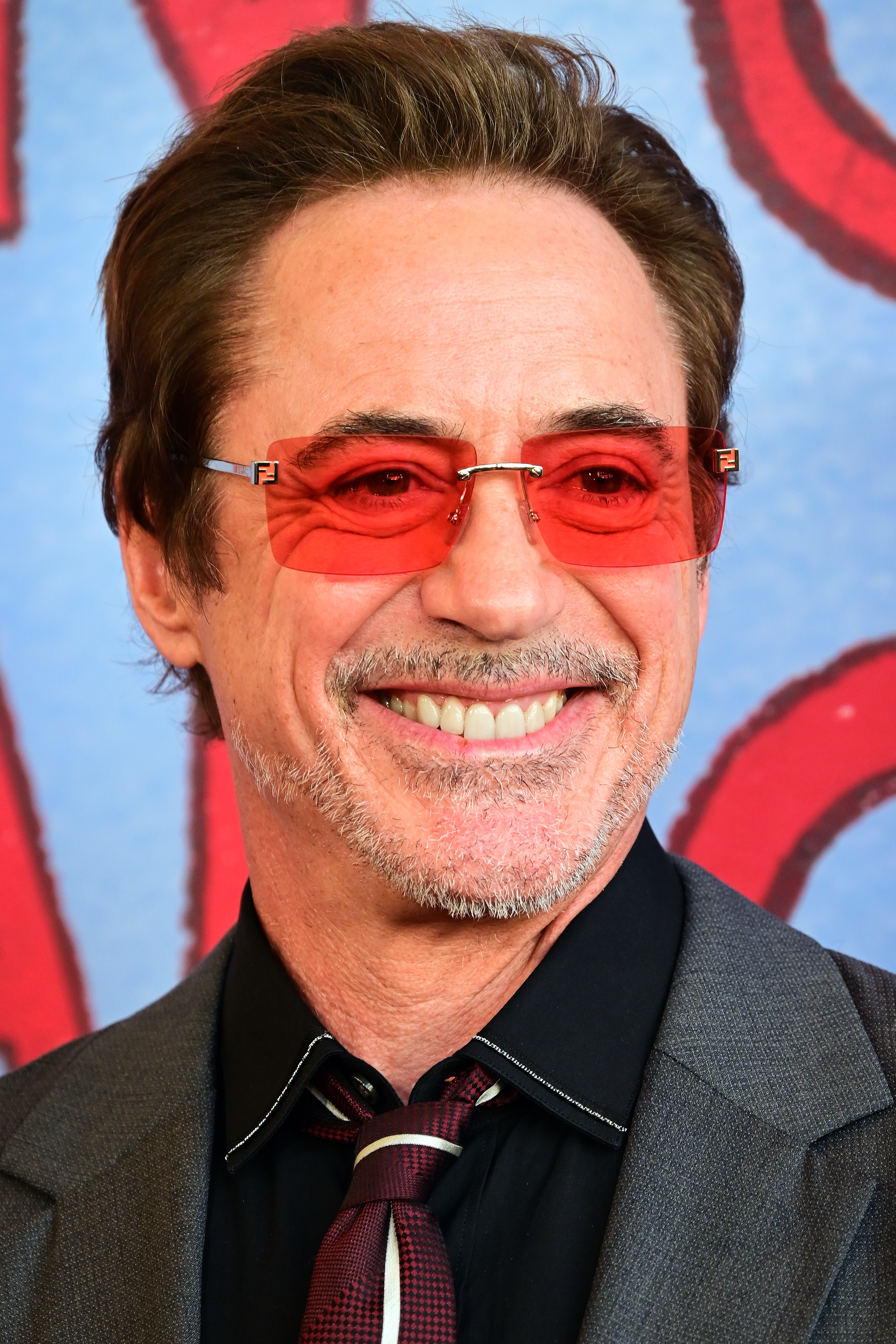
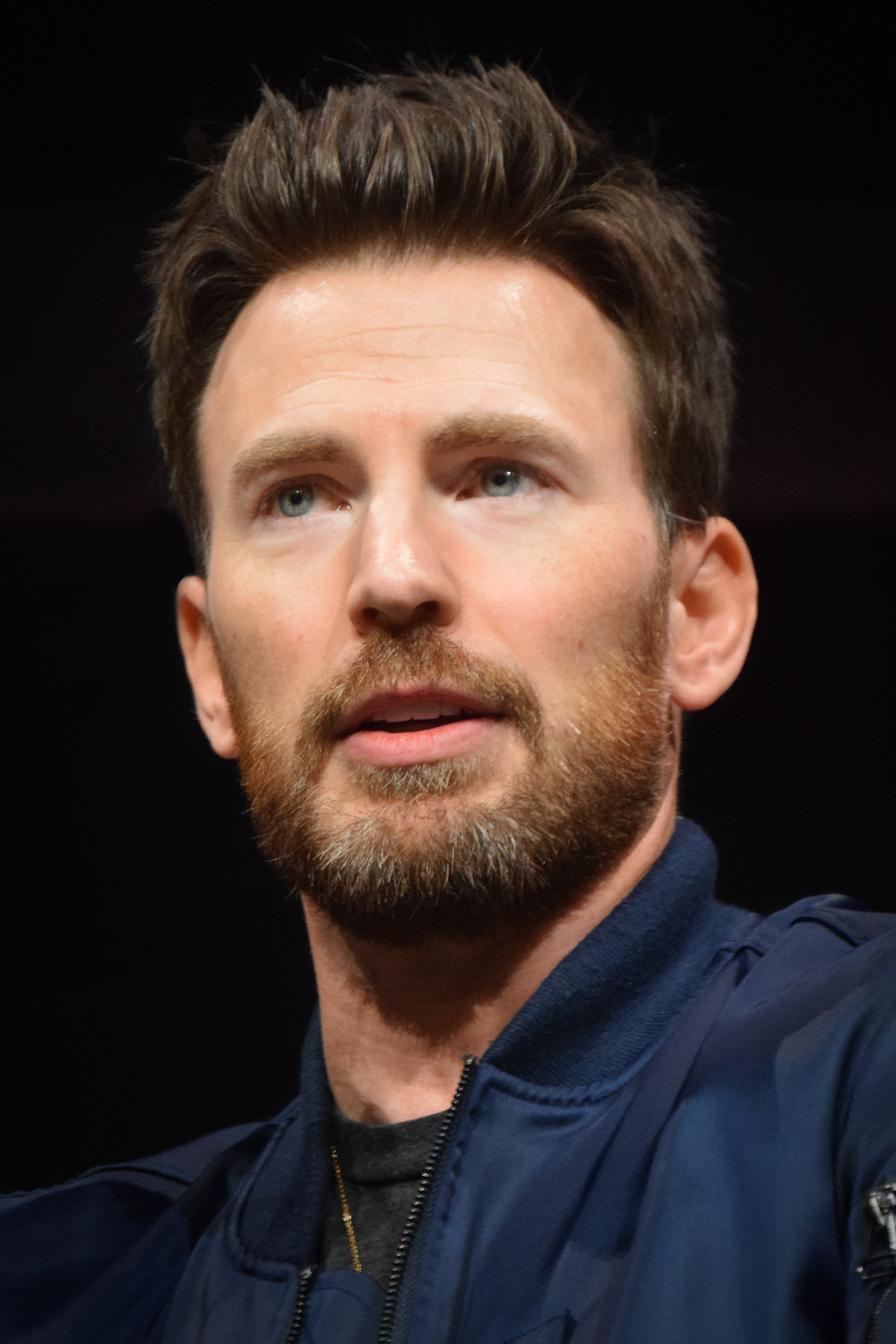
(L–R, T–B) Directors Joe and Anthony Russo and stars Robert Downey Jr. and Chris Evans all returned from previous MCU films for Doomsday following creative pivots, with Downey portraying the new main antagonist, Doctor Doom.

Shawn Levy became the studio's top choice to direct Avengers 5 by mid-March 2024, after he directed the MCU film Deadpool & Wolverine (2024), but there were potential scheduling issues with his other projects. By that May, Marvel Studios had approached Robert Downey Jr.—who starred as Tony Stark / Iron Man in "The Infinity Saga", covering the MCU's Phases One, Two, and Three—about returning to the MCU to take on the new character of Victor von Doom / Doctor Doom. Downey said he would only return if the Russo brothers also returned as directors. After McFeely approached the Russos with an idea for the films that excited them, they entered early talks to direct both Avengers 5 and Secret Wars by mid-July. During SDCC at the end of the month, the Russos were confirmed to be directing the two films. They revealed that Avengers 5 was now titled Avengers: Doomsday, and both films would feature Downey as Doctor Doom. McFeely had joined as writer for both films, working with Waldron. Chris McKenna and Erik Sommers, writers on the MCU Spider-Man films, also worked on the scripts for Doomsday and Secret Wars, though McKenna said their work was mainly focused on writing Secret Wars, providing "a little bit" of help on Doomsday. McFeely and Waldron received final screenwriting credits for Doomsday. Marvel Studios co-president Louis D'Esposito and executive Jonathan Schwartz also produce Doomsday alongside Feige. On casting Downey as Doom, Feige said, "He played the most iconic hero. Let's have him play the most iconic villain." Feige stated that "Time Runs Out", the prelude storyline for the 2015–16 "Secret Wars", also served as inspiration for the two films, and said one of their goals was to give closure to Marvel storylines that predated the MCU, including those of characters from 20th Century Fox's X-Men film series.

In March 2025, Marvel announced 26 cast members for the film alongside Downey. Many of those actors returned from previous MCU media and some were reprising their roles from Fox's X-Men films. Downey, Marvel Studios, and Feige teased that there were more cast members to reveal, including the return of Chris Evans as Steve Rogers; the Russos felt the correct way for them to return to the MCU would be to continue his story, and Joe Russo said the story they came up with for the films had integral roles for both Downey and Evans. By September 2026, some additional cast members had been revealed, with the full cast still yet to be announced. Doomsday features groups of heroes from three different universes—the Avengers, Wakandans, and New Avengers from Earth-616; the Fantastic Four from Earth-828; and the "original" X-Men from Earth-10005—converging to face Doom. Feige said they were using the Secret Wars idea of different universes colliding to unite cast members from different film franchises, and that Doomsday was picking up where Endgame left off.

Production designer Gavin Bocquet and cinematographer Newton Thomas Sigel reteamed with the Russo brothers after working on their television series Citadel (2023–present); Sigel also worked on the Russos' film Cherry (2021) and a selection of Fox's X-Men films. Costume designer Judianna Makovsky returned from previous MCU films. The Russos said Doomsday and Secret Wars were being produced together in a similar way to Infinity War and Endgame, but they would not be filmed back-to-back like those films were. Principal photography for Doomsday began on April 28, 2025, at Pinewood Studios in Buckinghamshire, England, under the working title Apple Pie 1. In May 2025, Disney delayed the release date to December 18, 2026, to allow more time for production to be completed. Location filming was taking place in Bahrain by the end of the month, and was also set to occur at Windsor Great Park in June and August. Filming also took place at Shinfield Studios in Berkshire, England. Filming wrapped on September 19, 2025. Jeffrey Ford and Matthew Schmidt are editing the film, having worked on previous MCU media. The Hollywood Reporter reported that there would be a "healthy" amount of additional photography, which took place in early-to-mid-2026.

== Music ==
In April 2024, Alan Silvestri indicated that he could be composing the music for an upcoming MCU project after previously doing so for Infinity War, Endgame, and other MCU films. That July, he was confirmed to be returning as the composer for both Doomsday and Secret Wars.

== Marketing ==
Following the announcement of Downey's casting as Doom and other details at SDCC in July 2024, several unique marketing stunts were used for Doomsday. Many cast members were announced as part of a nearly five-and-a-half-hour-long livestream in March 2025, which became the most-viewed cross-platform livestream stunt. Four short teasers premiered in theaters ahead of showings for the film Avatar: Fire and Ash (2025), including one that revealed Evans's return as Rogers. These teasers were leaked upon their debuts, which Marvel had expected, and were officially released online soon after. The first full trailer debuted at CinemaCon in April 2026, and was met with mixed responses when it was released online in July. A "special look" focusing on Doom received more positive responses when it was released in August, after being shown at SDCC 2026 and Disney's D23 convention. A common element of the teasers and trailers is a clock counting down to the film's release.

A re-release of Endgame, subtitled Encore, was released in September 2026, with new footage that acts as a narrative bridge between Endgame and Doomsday, enhancing the story of the latter. The additional footage was shot during production of Doomsday. The Countdown to Avengers: Doomsday official podcast, hosted by Iman Vellani—who stars as Kamala Khan / Ms. Marvel in the MCU—and podcaster Frank Alvarez, premiered on August 27, 2026. The five-episode weekly podcast recaps key MCU moments leading up to Doomsday. Six additional podcast episodes began releasing weekly on November 5, 2026, covering the original Fox X-Men trilogy and several films of the Multiverse Saga. The film also had numerous brand partnerships, along with merchandise and clothing items. The global promotional tour will include stops in Las Vegas, São Paulo, the Gold Coast in Queensland, Rome, London, Seoul, Shanghai, Toronto, and Los Angeles.

== Release ==
Avengers: Doomsday is scheduled to be released in the United Kingdom on December 16, 2026, and in the United States in over 4,000 theaters on December 18. It was originally scheduled for May 2, 2025, but was delayed to May 1, 2026, in part due to the 2023 Writers Guild of America strike, followed by another delay to the December 2026 date to allow more time for production to be completed. It will be part of Phase Six of the MCU.

In early 2026, Doomsday was revealed to not have access to IMAX theaters in the United States for at least three weeks because the film Dune: Part Three, which is also scheduled for release on December 18, has exclusivity in that time frame. Doomsday is expected to be released in IMAX in select international markets, and will also be available in other premium large formats (PLFs) such as Dolby Vision, ScreenX, D-Box, and 4DX, as well as RealD 3D. TheWrap reported in March that Disney was planning to push hard to gain access to those other formats and to get into as many of the 322 chain-specific theater formats around the world as possible. The next month, Disney announced that Doomsday would receive the company's Infinity Vision certification for PLFs, which is intended to inform audiences which theaters offer "the biggest, brightest, and most immersive cinematic experiences" and meet certain technical standards. Many commentators felt Infinity Vision was created in response to Doomsday not being able to open in IMAX in the United States. The Russos worked with ScreenX to create a specific version of the film for that format featuring expanded images. In November 2026, Omelete reported that Infinity Vision–versions of the film would have approximately one additional minute of footage from regular versions.

== Box office projections ==
Rebecca Rubin at Variety reported in March 2026 that early box office tracking was "strong" and there were predictions that Doomsday would be 2026's highest-grossing film. Rubin and her colleague Jordan Moreau elaborated that Marvel Studios' recent box office track record had been "rocky", but the studio had success with the Avengers-style crossover films Spider-Man: No Way Home (2021) and Deadpool & Wolverine. Theatrical exhibitors were excited for Doomsday considering Endgame's record-breaking run, and there was potential for the combined release of Doomsday and Dune: Part Three to result in one of the biggest box office weekends ever.

The film generated $16.5 million in advance premium format ticket sales in the first 24 hours of sales in July 2026, more than double the pre-sales Deadpool & Wolverine had. Rubin said this was notable because the sales did not include IMAX. Many of the roughly 1,000 PLF theaters had sold out screenings on December 17 and 18, with theaters looking to add more screenings on Christmas Day and beyond. By the end of August, the film had grossed $35 million in advance ticket sales, with Global Box Office reporting that it could earn $260–300 million in its opening weekend. Pre-sales had reached $50 million by early September 2026, 100 days before its release, becoming the first film to achieve this in that time frame. Disney said 70 percent of advance tickets sold were for Infinity Vision showings. By the end of October, the film had reached $125 million in pre-sales. Caroline Reid at Forbes said the strong pre-sales were being driven by "die-hard fans" who wanted to see the film on opening weekend, and questioned whether this would translate into continued box office success in subsequent weekends with general audiences who may be concerned about the amount of MCU projects required to understand Doomsday's story. She said the critical response would have an impact on the film's longevity at the box office. A month before the film's release, Disney announced there was a "spike" in ticket sales following the release of the VisionQuest (2026) finale, which included a mid-credits scene featuring Doom and Wanda Maximoff / Scarlet Witch that was believed to be a tease for Doomsday. Also at that time, Box Office Theory reported the film could earn $340 million in its opening weekend.

== Sequel ==
A sequel, Avengers: Secret Wars, is scheduled to be released on December 17, 2027. It is also being written by Waldron, McFeely, McKenna, and Sommers, and directed by the Russo brothers. The film will conclude Phase Six and the Multiverse Saga of the MCU.
