= Cobalt (Fear the Walking Dead) =

- Fear the Walking Dead episode
- Episode no.: Season 1 Episode 5
- Directed by: Kari Skogland
- Written by: David Wiener
- Original air date: September 27, 2015
- Running time: 45 minutes

Guest appearances
- Colman Domingo as Victor Strand; Patricia Reyes Spindola as Griselda Salazar; Shawn Hatosy as Andrew Adams; Sandrine Holt as Bethany Exner; Jamie McShane as Moyers

Episode chronology
← Previous "Not Fade Away"	Next → "The Good Man"
- Fear the Walking Dead (season 1)

"Cobalt" is the fifth and penultimate episode of the first season of the post-apocalyptic horror television series Fear the Walking Dead, which aired on AMC on September 27, 2015 in the United States.

This episode marks Colman Domingo’s first appearance as Victor Strand who would go on to become a prominent character.

== Plot ==
In a cell at a military compound, Doug, who was previously removed from his neighborhood for refusing to comply with medical inspections, is mocked by another detainee, Victor Strand. When Doug begins to break down in tears, he is moved to another location by guardsmen. Strand then turns his attention to another cellmate, the feverish Nick; when one of the guards tries to move Nick to a new cell, Strand bribes him into leaving Nick with him. When Nick asks why he did it, Strand explains that he has a plan to escape, and he wants to recruit Nick to join him. Meanwhile, in the infirmary at the same compound, Liza helps Dr. Exner treat patients at the hospital, but grows frustrated when she is given limited information on the whereabouts of Nick and Griselda. She manages to discover where Griselda is being treated, but Griselda dies of septic shock; Liza and Exner use a captive bolt pistol to prevent her from reanimating.

Back at the neighborhood, Chris is devastated that Liza left voluntarily to help at the hospital, believing that she abandoned them, and worries for her safety, though Travis promises to bring her back. Ofelia grows distressed at the whereabouts of her mother, and begins threatening some of the guardsmen and demanding an explanation. Some of the troops prepare to take her into custody, but the guard she had been flirting with, Corporal Adams, offers to defuse the situation and take her home. Later on, however, Madison discovers that Daniel and Ofelia have tied up Adams in the Trans' basement, with Daniel confiding that he plans to interrogate Adams on the whereabouts of Nick and Griselda. Though Madison is initially horrified at this discovery, she agrees to keep it a secret from Ofelia, who believes that Daniel is simply planning to use Adams as a bargaining chip to bring back Griselda.

In an attempt to cheer up Chris, Alicia takes him to the abandoned home of one of their wealthy neighbors, where the two of them get drunk and begin destroying many of the items inside. While walking back to their house later that evening, they notice that the National Guards troops seem to be preparing to leave the area. Meanwhile, Travis manages to convince Moyers' squad to take him to the hospital to check on his friends. While en route, the soldiers stop near a convenience store where Moyers encourages Travis to shoot the reanimated corpse of one of the employees; Travis is emotionally unable to pull the trigger, much to the frustration of the soldiers. After continuing onward, the soldiers stop again to assist another squad in a building infested by the undead, and most of those soldiers, including Moyers, are overwhelmed and presumed dead. The few survivors flee and drop off Travis back at the neighborhood, to his disappointment. Travis soon learns that Daniel abducted and tortured Adams into revealing several important pieces of information, including the location of the military compound, as well as the presence of a nearby sports arena where the military locked over two thousand civilians inside, resulting in a massive horde of the undead. Though Travis is initially horrified to hear that Daniel tortured him, Daniel interrupts by telling him that Adams also revealed what the commonly used codeword "cobalt" means: in the morning, all civilians will be killed by the guardsmen, and the guardsmen will evacuate the city. Travis and the others immediately begin plotting to escape before the morning. Later that evening, Daniel investigates the sports arena, where he confirms Adams' story and discovers it to be sealed shut and containing thousands of reanimated corpses.

== Reception ==
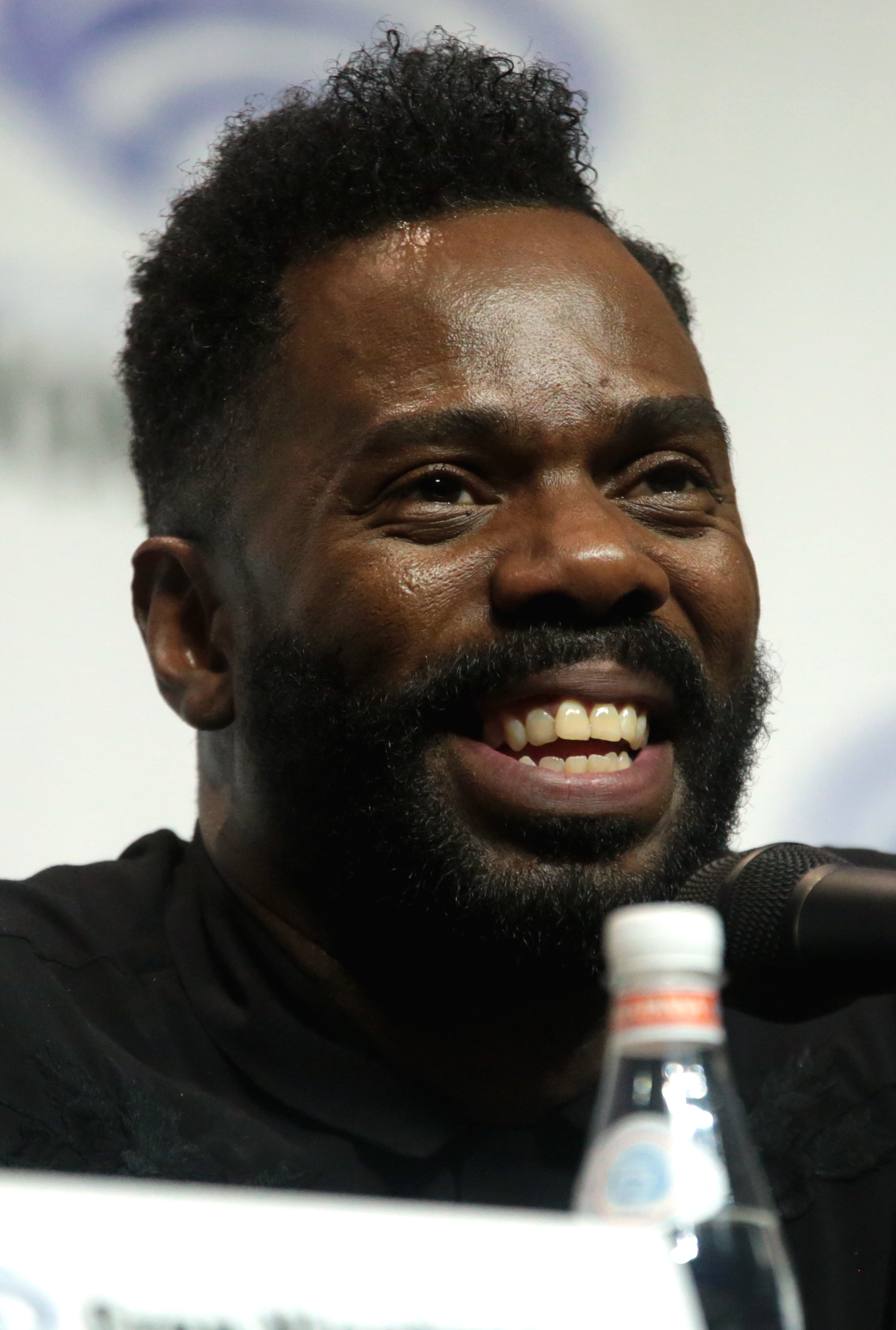
Colman Domingo made his first appearance as Victor Strand in this episode.

"Cobalt" received positive reviews from critics. On Rotten Tomatoes, it garnered a 76% rating with an average score of 7.73/10 based on 21 reviews. The site consensus reads: "In the penultimate episode of Fear the Walking Dead's first season, 'Cobalt' injects new life into its sequestered group of survivors with an intriguing new character."

Matt Fowler of IGN gave "Cobalt" a 6.8/10.0 rating stating; "While 'Cobalt' may have set us up for (hopefully) a zombie-filled FTWD finale, it was also sort of a mess. Travis continued to do nothing except witness things while, for some reason, an evacuation plan needed to be brutally tortured out of a National Guardsman who should have been on the Salazar family's side given his feelings for Ofelia. Granted, there were some nice, dark Daniel moments here, but there were too many puzzle pieces missing. Even Madison felt wasted this week."

Josh Modell writing for The A.V. Club praised the episode with a qualification of B+ and in his review he said: "The question that had interested/nagged me a bit over Fear The Walking Dead's first few episodes was answered tonight, in a couple of interesting, insightful ways".

Jeremy Egner of The New York Times praised the episode and wrote: "Titled "Cobalt," the episode was an anxious, nervy hour that resisted overwrought obviousness - the Achilles' heel of The Walking Dead - in favor of shaded musings on the moral relativism of the survival instinct".

=== Ratings ===
"Cobalt" was seen by 6.70 million viewers in the United States on its original air date, slightly above the previous episodes rating of 6.62 million. "Cobalt" was the first episode of Fear the Walking Dead to have a higher viewership than its previous episode.
