= Martin Sensmeier =

Native American actor from Alaska (born 1985)

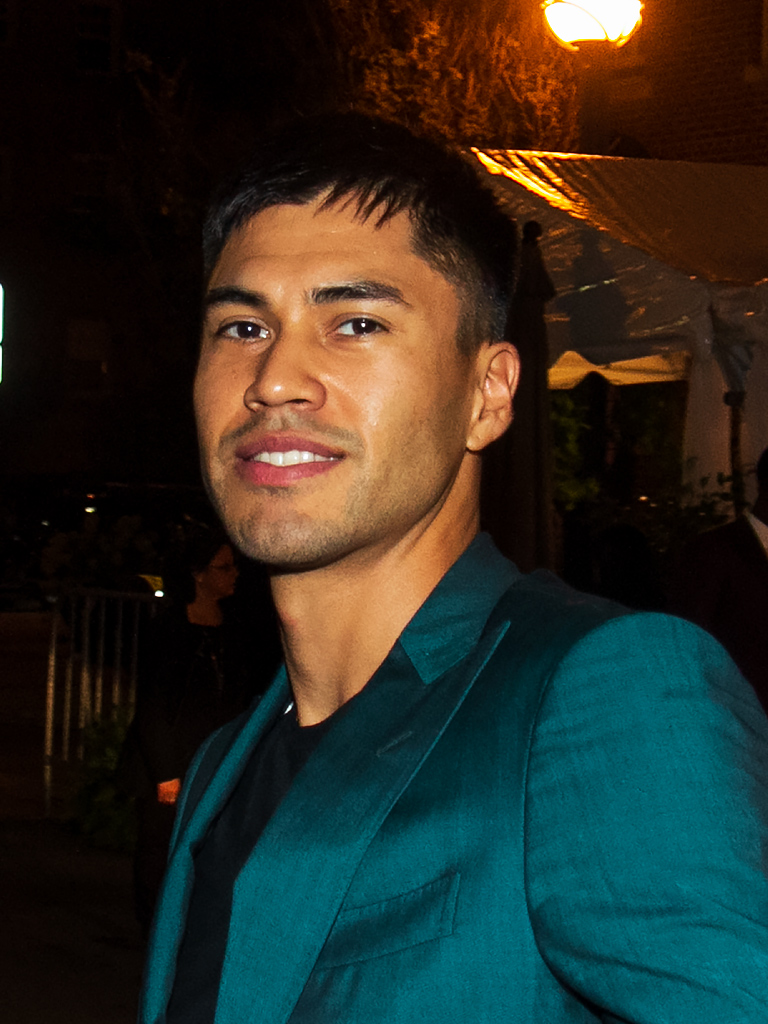
- Sensmeier at the 2016 Toronto International Film Festival
- Born: June 27, 1985 (age 41); Anchorage, Alaska, U.S.
- Citizenship: United States; Central Council of the Tlingit & Haida Indian Tribes of Alaska
- Occupations: Actor, Model
- Years active: 2012–present
- Partner: Kahara Hodges (since 2016)
- Children: 2

Martin Sensmeier (born June 27, 1985) is an American actor and model. An Alaska Native, he is Tlingit and Koyukon Athabascan.

Sensmeier is known for playing various Native American roles. He starred in The Magnificent Seven (2016), a remake of the 1960 film of the same name, and had a recurring role as "Wanahton" in the HBO television series Westworld (2018). More recently, he has played a physical therapist in the TV series Yellowstone and a Comanche warrior named Sam in the prequel 1883, both directed by Taylor Sheridan.

== Early life ==
Sensmeier was born in 1985 in Anchorage, Alaska, to Raymond and Eva Sensmeier, but was raised in Yakutat. His father is Tlingit and German-American, while his mother is Koyukon Athabascan from Ruby, Alaska, on the Yukon River. Sensmeier identifies with the cultures of his Alaska Native grandmothers, which his parents stressed. Martin’s paternal grandfather, Gilbert Michael Sensmeier, was born in Indiana of German descent. He is a citizen of the Central Council of the Tlingit & Haida Indian Tribes of Alaska.

== Career ==
Sensmeier began his working career as a welder, then worked on an oil rig for Doyon Drilling. He quit to pursue an acting career in Los Angeles. There and in New York, Sensmeier worked as a professional model; he gradually found work as an actor in Los Angeles.

His first feature film was the sci-fi thriller Beyond the Sky. He appeared in a leading role, as one of the "seven", in the 2016 feature film The Magnificent Seven, a remake of an earlier version.

In 2017, Sensmeier was cast in the lead role in the biopic The Chickasaw Rancher, portraying Montford Johnson (Chickasaw), a man who built a ranching empire near the Chisholm Trail. That year he also had a role as Chip Hanson in the film Wind River, and will reprise the role in the upcoming sequel Wind River: The Next Chapter.

Sensmeier joined the cast in the second (2018) season of the HBO television series Westworld, in the recurring role of Wanahton.

In 2020, he took on the role of Chief Eddy in the original English version of the video game Tell Me Why from Dontnod Entertainment. The game is set in Alaska and the character belongs to the indigenous Tlingit people, as does Sensmeier.

More recently, he has played a physical therapist in Season 2 of Taylor Sheridan's Yellowstone, the four-season saga of the Dutton family and their patriarch's determination to keep the ranch intact, and the character of Sam, a Comanche warrior, in 1883, Sheridan's prequel to Yellowstone. 1883 centers on a group of covered-wagon settlers seeking a new life in Oregon after banding together in Texas. It stars Sam Elliot, Tim McGraw, Faith Hill & newcomer Isabel May as Elsa Dutton, the series narrator and love interest of Sam's.

In 2023, Sensmeier starred in the western thriller Cottonmouth, which is set for release in 2024.

== Personal life ==
Sensmeier is a member of the Native Wellness Institute, a youth advocacy group. He is proud of his Alaska Native heritage.

Sensmeier and partner Kahara Hodges have two children, born 2020 and 2022.

== Filmography ==
Year	Title	Role	Notes
2014	K'ina Kil: The Slaver's Son	Tintah	Short Film
2014	Salem	Mohawk	Uncredited
2016	Lilin's Brood	Wolf	
2016	The Magnificent Seven	Red Harvest	
2016	Westworld	Native Warrior	Uncredited; Episode: "The Original"
2017	Wind River	Chip Hanson	
2018	Perfect	The Harvester	
2018	Westworld	Wanahton	Recurring role
2018	Beyond the Sky	Kyle Blackburn	
2018	Spare Room	David	
2019	Yellowstone	Martin	Recurring role (Season 2)
2020	FBI: Most Wanted	Reginald Waters	Episode: "Ghosts"
2020	Tell Me Why	Chief Eddy	Video game
2020	The Liberator	Samuel Coldfoot	Miniseries, main cast
2021	The Ice Road	Cody	
2021	Rutherford Falls	Ray	
2022	1883	Sam	Recurring role (Season 1)
2022	La Brea	Taamet	Recurring role (Season 2)
2022	9 Bullets	Eddie	
2022	The Last Manhunt	Willie Boy	
2023	Frybread Face and Me	Marvin	
2025	Icefall	Pen	
2026	Takeover	Hilario	
2026	The Terminal List	Sergeant Major Jeff Otaktay	Recurring role (Season 2)
TBA	Wind River: The Next Chapter †	Chip Hanson	Post-production
