= Beyond the Sky (film) =

2018 American film written and directed by Fulvio Sestito

- Directed by: Fulvio Sestito
- Screenplay by: Marc Porterfield; Rob Warren Thomas
- Story by: Rebecca Berrih; Fulvio Sestito; Rob Warren Thomas
- Produced by: Rebecca Berrih; Evan Cholfin; Martine Melloul
- Starring: Ryan Carnes; Jordan Hinson; Claude Duhamel; Martin Sensmeier; Don Stark; Peter Stormare; Dee Wallace
- Cinematography: Chris Saul
- Edited by: Zach Scott
- Music by: Don Davis
- Production company: Elysian Fields Entertainment
- Distributed by: RLJE Films
- Release date: September 21, 2018
- Running time: 82 minutes
- Country: United States
- Language: English

Beyond the Sky is a 2018 American science fiction film written and directed by Fulvio Sestito in his directorial debut. The film stars Ryan Carnes, Jordan Hinson, Claude Duhamel, Martin Sensmeier, Don Stark, Peter Stormare, and Dee Wallace. It was acquired by RLJE Films in 2018 and was released on September 21, 2018. The working title was FMS-False Memory Syndrome.

== Plot ==
The film follows a documentary filmmaker and his crew as they seek to expose the lies of alien abductees and their encounter with a young woman whose dark secret leads them to uncover a disturbing truth.

== Cast ==
- Ryan Carnes as Chris Norton
- Jordan Hinson as Emily Reed
- Claude Duhamel as Brent
- Martin Sensmeier as Kyle Blackburn
- Don Stark as Bill Johnson
- Peter Stormare as Peter Norton
- Dee Wallace as Lucille

== Production and release ==
Beyond the Sky is Sestito's debut feature film. Filming was completed in Los Angeles, California and various locations in Arizona and New Mexico.
