= Trioscope Studios =

American animation studio

- Type: Private
- Industry: Animation
- Founded: January 22, 2020; 6 years ago
- Founder: L.C. Crowley; Brandon Barr; Greg Jonkajtys
- Headquarters: Culver City, California U.S
- Website: trioscope.co

Trioscope Studios is an American animation studio based in Culver City, California. Founded in 2020 by L.C. Crowley, Brandon Barr, and Greg Jonkajtys.

== History ==
In 2021, the company raise $5 million.

== Filmography ==
Show	Creator(s)	Year(s)	Network	Co-production(s)	Notes
The Liberator	Jeb Stuart	2020	Netflix	A&E Studios; Unique Features	
