= Alex Livinalli =

Venezuelan-American actor (born 1984)

- Born: Alejandro Reynaldo Livinalli Gonzalez; January 31, 1984 (age 42); Caracas, Venezuela
- Occupation: Actor
- Years active: 2008–present
- Known for: Black Panther: Wakanda Forever

Alejandro Reynaldo "Alex" Livinalli Gonzalez (born January 31, 1984) is a Venezuelan-American actor. He is best known for his role as Attuma in Black Panther: Wakanda Forever (2022), a role he is set to reprise in Avengers: Doomsday (2026).

== Early life ==
Alejandro Reynaldo Livinalli Gonzalez was born on January 31, 1984, in Caracas, Venezuela. He moved to the United States when he was ten years old and attended Miami Dade College from 2005 to 2007, receiving a degree in drama. Livinalli was first inspired to pursue acting after seeing Benicio del Toro's performance in Traffic.

== Career ==
Livinalli started his career in 2008, appearing in the indie thriller The Next Hit, which also featured rappers such as Flo Rida and Rick Ross. He worked on short and student films before he had a strong supporting role in the 2009 Syfy TV movie Mandrake. Livinalli moved to Los Angeles in 2010 and studied under David Proval.

Livinalli was announced as part of the cast of Black Panther: Wakanda Forever by Ryan Coogler during the 2022 San Diego Comic-Con. To prepare for the movie, he learned freediving and the Yucatec Maya language. Over three and a half months, he gained 35 pounds, consuming 5,500 calories each day and constantly working out.

== Personal life ==
Livinalli is a fan of the Miami Heat. He is fluent in Spanish and English, but had learned Portuguese, Mayan, and Comanche for films.

== Filmography ==
=== Film ===
| Year | Title | Role | Notes |
|---|---|---|---|
| 1999 | Beware | Fransisco | |
| 2008 | The Next Hit | Rico | |
| 2010 | High School Gig | Peter | |
| 2010 | Mandrake | Beast Warrior | |
| 2010 | Los expertos | Ronaldo | |
| 2011 | Yellow Rock | Spear of Fire | |
| 2011 | Cowboys & Indins | Many Wounds | |
| 2012 | Miami 13 | Manny | |
| 2012 | Revan | Ruben | |
| 2018 | Icebox | Julio | |
| 2019 | Alita: Battle Angel | Blue Wingman | |
| 2022 | Blind Trust | Villanova | |
| 2022 | Black Panther: Wakanda Forever | Attuma | |
| 2026 | Takeover | Francisco | |
| 2026 | Avengers: Doomsday † | Attuma | Post-production |
| TBA | Inground † | Armando | Post-production |
| TBA | New England Toys † | TBA | Filming |

=== Television ===
| Year | Title | Role | Notes |
|---|---|---|---|
| 2013 | The Vampire Diaries | Man | Episode: "Into the Wild"; credited as Alejandro Livinalli |
| 2013 | Burn Notice | DCA Agent | Episode: "Nature of the Beast" |
| 2013 | The Seventh Spectrum | Nayati | Episode: "Valley of Mist" |
| 2013 | Sleepy Hollow | Wiroh | Episode: "For the Triumph of Evil" |
| 2013–2014 | Nashville | Luke's Assistant | 2 episodes |
| 2014 | Chicago P.D. | Paco | Episode: "Turn the Light Off" |
| 2014 | Graceland | Diego | 3 episodes |
| 2015 | Banshee | Nas | 3 episodes |
| 2015 | The Red Road | Gordy | Episode: "Intruders" |
| 2015 | Zoo | Gang Boy | Episode: "This is What is Sounds Like" |
| 2016 | Fall Into Me | Ty | 7 episodes |
| 2016 | Queen of the South | Lucian | 2 episodes |
| 2016 | Longmire | Joey Takoda | 3 episodes |
| 2017 | The Son | Escute | 2 episodes |
| 2018 | The Inspectors | Tony Belder | Episode: "The Henry Wainwright Foundation" |
| 2018 | NCIS: New Orleans | Hicks | Episode: "The Last Mile" |
| 2018 | Dead Silent | Benjamin Silva | Episode: "Savage Country" |
| 2019 | MacGyver | Trevor | Episode: "Wilderess + Training + Survival" |
| 2019 | American Horror Story | Julian Ramirez | Episode: "Mr. Jingles" |
| 2019 | Reprisal | Pony | Episode: "A Flintlock & A Hound" |
| 2020 | The Walking Dead | Shotgun Whisperer | Episode: "Look at the Flowers" |
| 2020 | 100 días para enamorarnos | Paramedico Martin | Episode: "Plutarco estrena su libertad" |
| 2020 | General Hospital | Manuel | Episode: "14679" |
| 2022 | Ozark | Santos Delgado | 2 episodes |
| 2023 | Based on a True Story | Seattle Stalker | Episode: "The Universe" |
| 2024 | Bad Monkey | Drug Runner | Episode: "Yo, Would You Tell Ms. Chase I Still Love Her Like Crazy" |
| 2024 | Outer Banks | Buffalo | Episode: "The Enduro" |
| 2024–2025 | BMF | Javier | Recurring role |
| 2025 | Government Cheese | Lee | Episode: "St. Hampton" |
| 2025–2026 | Power Book IV: Force | Cruz | Recurring role |
| 2026 | M.I.A. | Francisco Peña | 2 episodes |
