= Avengers Endgame: Encore =

2026 Marvel Studios film re-release

- Theatrical release poster
- Directed by: Anthony Russo; Joe Russo
- Produced by: Kevin Feige
- Starring: Chris Evans; Hayley Atwell; Tom Hiddleston; Mark Ruffalo; Robert Downey Jr.; Tara Strong; Owen Wilson; Ke Huy Quan; Eugene Cordero; James Dryden
- Production company: Marvel Studios
- Distributed by: Walt Disney Studios Motion Pictures
- Release date: September 25, 2026
- Running time: 183 minutes; 186–187 minutes (Infinity Vision and IMAX)
- Country: United States
- Language: English
- Box office: $143.2 million

Avengers Endgame: Encore is the 2026 re-release of Avengers: Endgame, a 2019 American superhero film produced by Marvel Studios and distributed by Walt Disney Studios Motion Pictures. Endgame was first re-released in June 2019, during its original theatrical run. A new re-release was revealed in December 2025 and the Encore subtitle was announced in June 2026. It features new footage that serves as a narrative bridge between Endgame and its sequel, Avengers: Doomsday (2026). This footage was filmed by Endgame and Doomsday directors Anthony and Joe Russo during Doomsday's production, and appears exclusively in Encore at the end of the original film and through its credits.

Avengers Endgame: Encore was released on September 25, 2026, during Phase Six of the Marvel Cinematic Universe (MCU), and was the first film to use Disney's Infinity Vision certification for premium large formats, with those and IMAX screenings featuring additional exclusive new footage. It grossed $143.2 million, bringing the worldwide total of Endgame to $2.942 billion, which made it the highest-grossing film of all time once again. The re-release received mixed responses from critics, with praise for the opportunity to see the film in theaters again but mixed thoughts on the changes to the original ending. There was speculation and commentary about each piece of new footage.

== Plot ==
Avengers Endgame: Encore features new footage that extends the original ending of Avengers: Endgame, two new mid-credits scenes, and a reworked post-credits tag:

- In an extended ending, after Steve Rogers decides to stay in the past with Peggy Carter, they are visited by a version of Loki who says he can help them both.
- In a mid-credits scene, Bruce Banner is self-isolating in a military complex underground after an incident. (Note: As depicted in the film Spider-Man: Brand New Day (2026)) While planning an experiment to help suppress the gamma radiation in his body, Banner is teleported out of his cell by Victor von Doom who says Banner is being "collected".
- In a second mid-credits scene, Time Variance Authority (TVA) employees Ouroboros, Casey, and Mobius M. Mobius detect an incursion between Earth-10005 and Earth-1127, with each alternate universe firing at the other trying to survive the collision. As more incursions are detected, Ouroboros realizes that the multiverse is collapsing.
- The sound of metal being hammered at the end of Endgame's credits is revealed to be Doom forging his mask.

== Cast ==
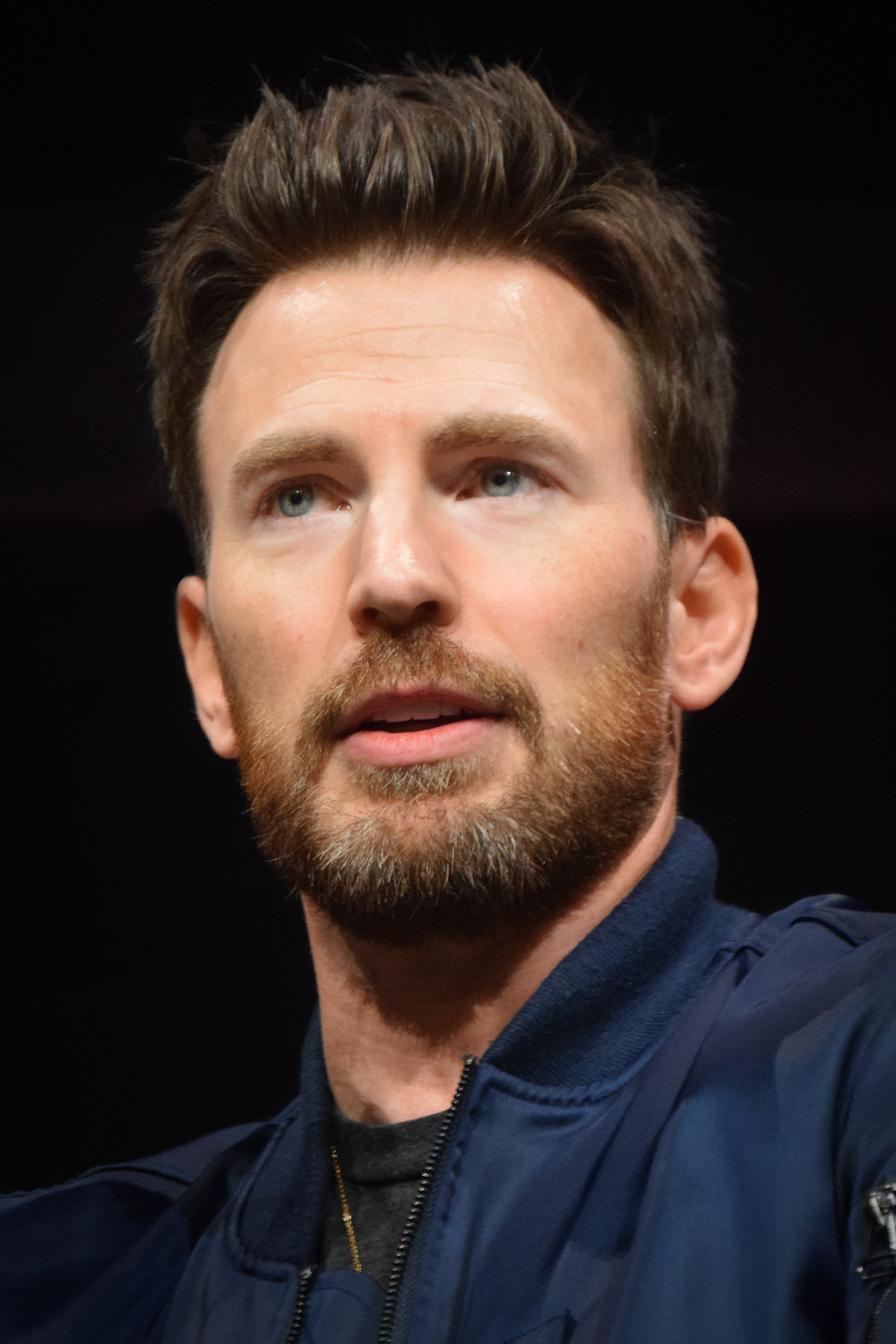
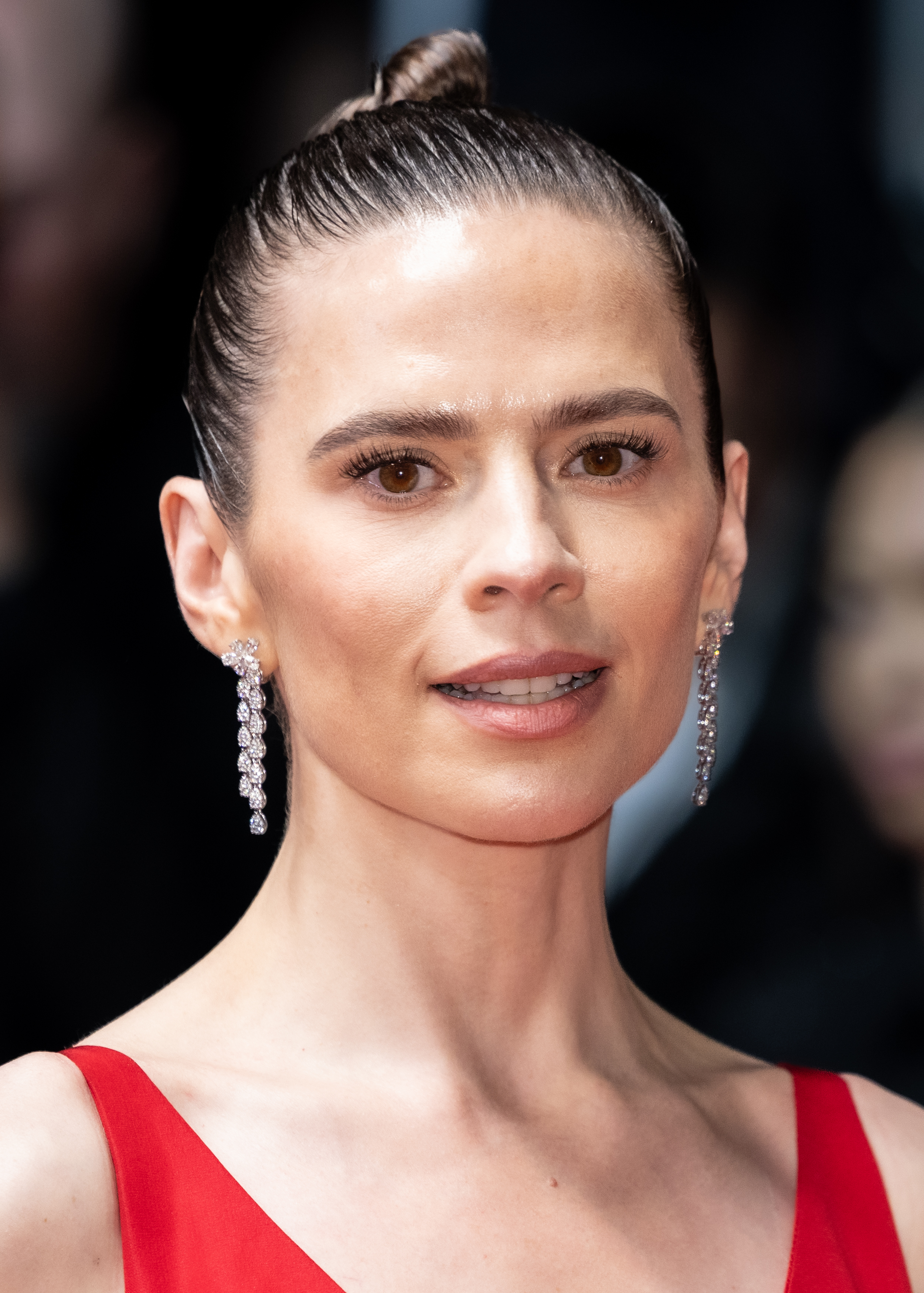
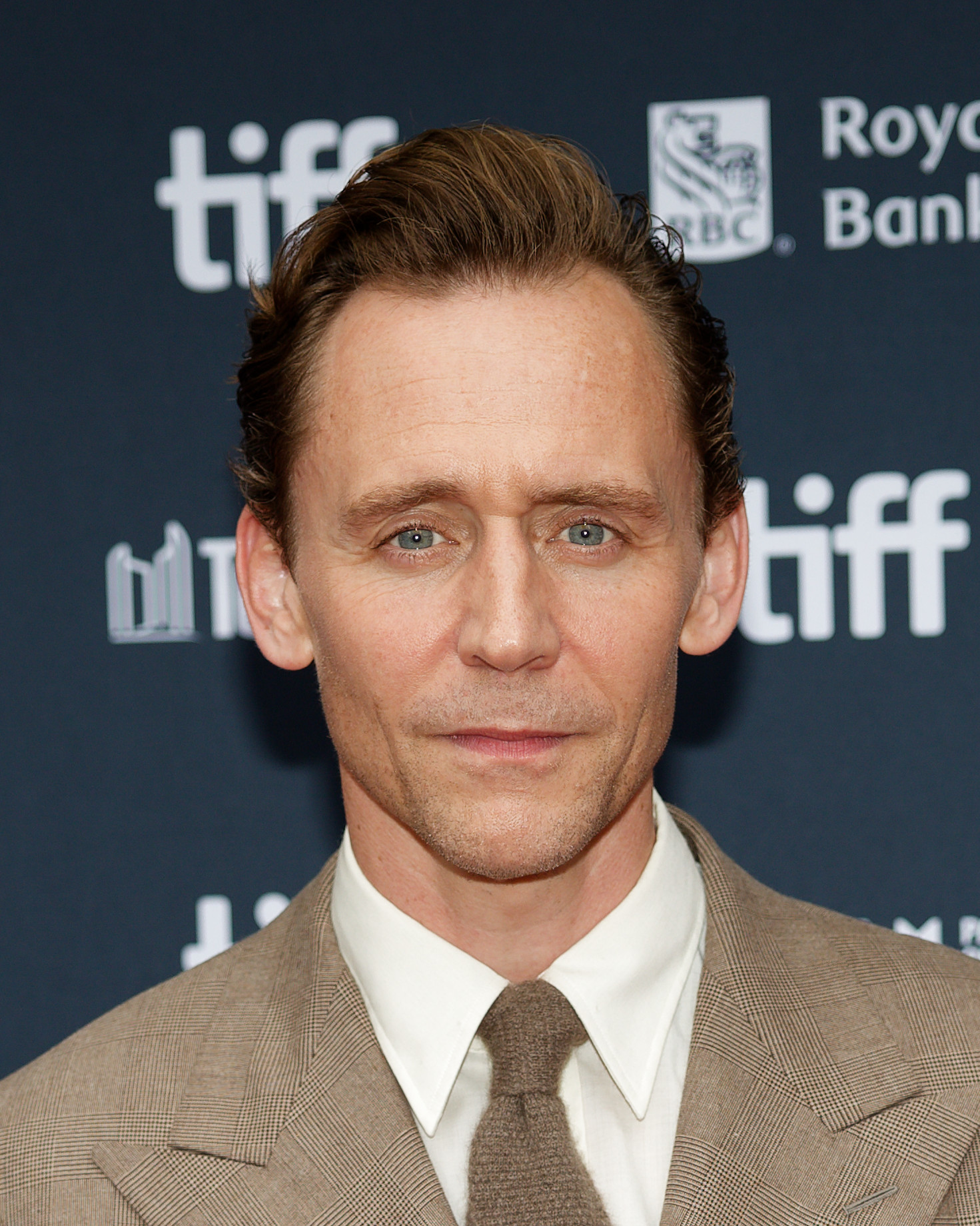
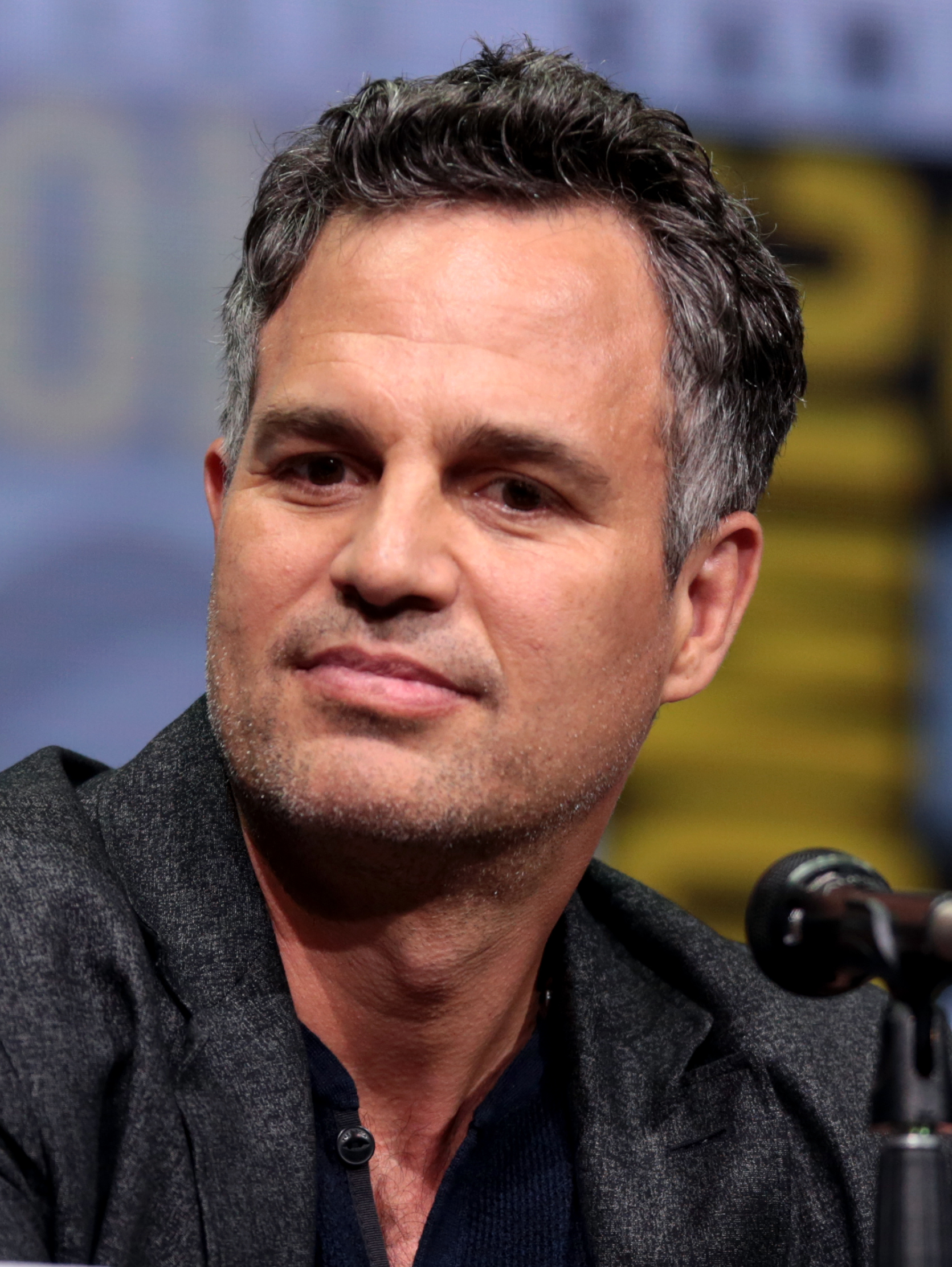
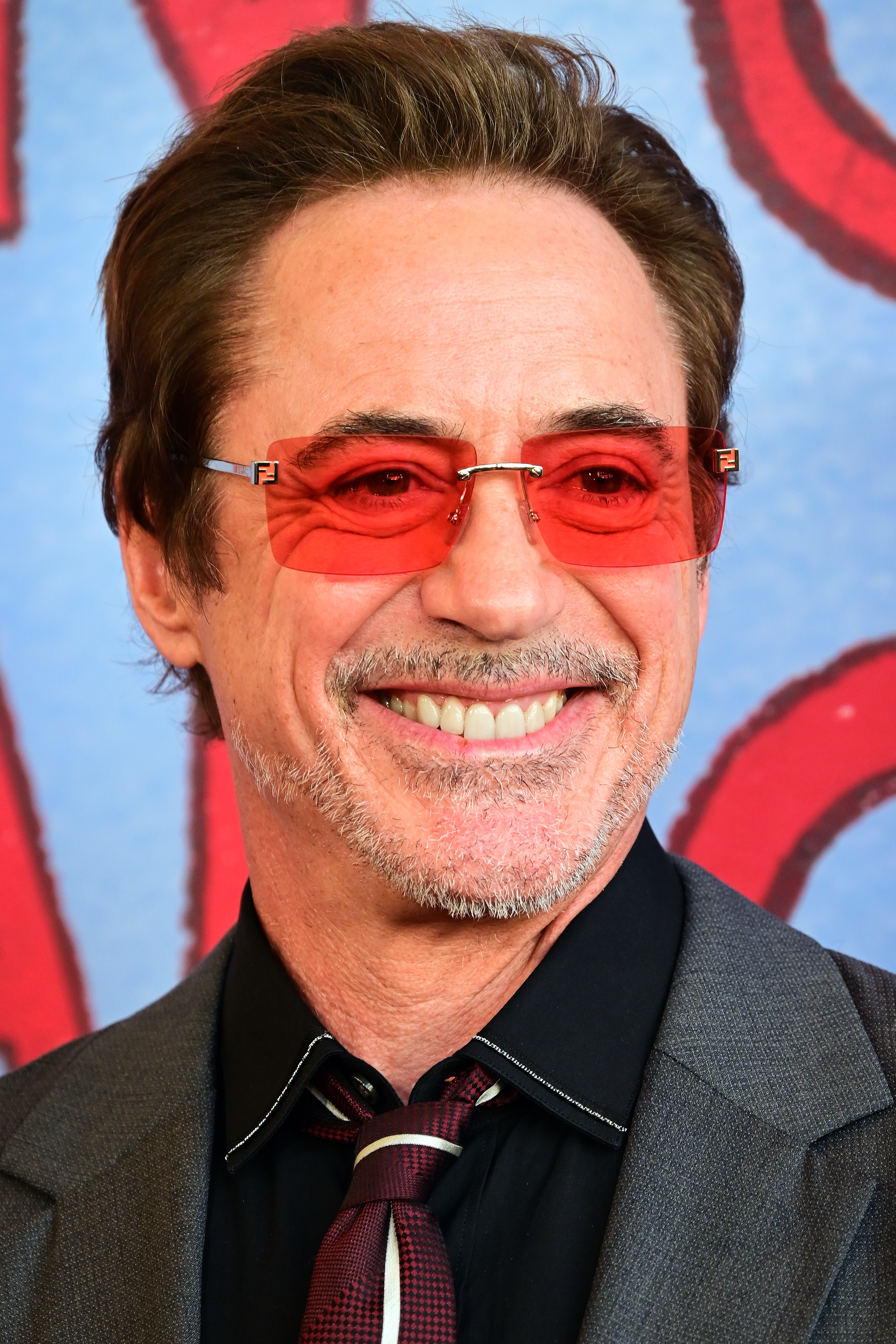
Cast members (left-to-right, top-to-bottom) Chris Evans, Hayley Atwell, Tom Hiddleston, Mark Ruffalo, Robert Downey Jr., Owen Wilson, Ke Huy Quan, and Eugene Cordero

These actors appear in the new footage that was filmed for Encore:

- Chris Evans as Steve Rogers: A super soldier and World War II veteran who returned to the 1940s to live with Peggy Carter
- Hayley Atwell as Peggy Carter: A military agent with the Strategic Scientific Reserve who is the love interest of Steve Rogers
- Tom Hiddleston as Loki:
  An alternate, "time variant" version of Loki—Thor's adopted brother and the god of mischief—who worked with the Time Variance Authority (TVA)
- Mark Ruffalo as Bruce Banner:
  A genius scientist who, because of exposure to gamma radiation, transforms into the Hulk, a muscular, green-skinned humanoid, when enraged or agitated
- Robert Downey Jr. as Victor von Doom / Doctor Doom: A powerful being who wields dark magic
- Tara Strong as the voice of Miss Minutes: The animated anthropomorphic AI clock mascot of the TVA
- Owen Wilson as Mobius M. Mobius: A TVA agent
- Ke Huy Quan as Ouroboros "O.B.": A TVA technician
- Eugene Cordero as Casey: A TVA agent
- James Dryden as Ralph: A TVA agent

== Production ==
=== Development and writing ===
On June 28, 2019, two months after its initial release, the Marvel Cinematic Universe (MCU) film Avengers: Endgame (2019) was re-released in theaters with seven minutes of new content, including a tribute to Marvel Comics figure Stan Lee, a deleted scene with unfinished visual effects, and the opening scene of the MCU film Spider-Man: Far From Home (2019).

In December 2025, it was announced that Endgame would again be re-released in theaters on September 25, 2026, in anticipation of its sequel Avengers: Doomsday being released in December 2026. In June 2026, the re-release was announced to be titled Avengers Endgame: Encore, and was revealed to feature new footage, including an exclusive look at Doomsday, resulting in up to five-to-six additional minutes depending on release format.

Endgame directors Anthony and Joe Russo returned as directors for Doomsday. Anthony explained that when they originally worked on Endgame, they viewed it as an ending and did not plan for the main story to continue. One of their motivations for re-releasing Endgame was to allow audiences to reexamine the film with the knowledge that the story would now be continuing in Doomsday. Joe said the re-release was "critically important", believing it was "required viewing" to follow the story of Doomsday. The new footage acts as a narrative bridge between the two films, enhancing the story of Doomsday and showing a natural progression from Endgame. Clues are included throughout the new footage hinting towards the larger story of Doomsday, with Joe also noting that specific lines from the original release of Endgame would have an impact on, and be "paid off" in, Doomsday. They hoped the re-release would recreate the energy and communal experience that many people had during Endgame's original release, including for anyone who did not see it in theaters previously.

The new scenes include an extended ending, two mid-credits scenes, and a reworked post-credits tag. The scenes feature Chris Evans as Steve Rogers, Hayley Atwell as Peggy Carter, Tom Hiddleston as Loki, Mark Ruffalo as Bruce Banner, Robert Downey Jr. as Victor von Doom / Doctor Doom, Tara Strong as the voice of Miss Minutes, Owen Wilson as Mobius M. Mobius, Ke Huy Quan as Ouroboros "O.B.", Eugene Cordero as Casey, and James Dryden as Ralph. Strong, Wilson, Quan, and Cordero reprise their roles from the Disney+ television series Loki (2021–2023), while Dryden reprises his role from the MCU film Deadpool & Wolverine (2024).

Anthony Russo said the extended ending with Loki visiting Rogers and Carter was "where Doomsday was born", and they were excited to extend beyond Endgame's "perfect" ending and explore "how radically that moment can change by just taking one step past it". Hiddleston said the scene teased a "thrilling prospect" of what could come next, and explained that it is set after the events of Loki, with his character using his duplication and illusion powers to appear in the scene after becoming the God of Stories and a guardian of the multiverse at the End of Time. The mid-credits scene with Banner helped tease the character's involvement "in the story that revolves around Doom", while Joe Russo said the Time Variance Authority (TVA) scene had "a great level of importance" to the story of Doomsday, and called the collapse of the multiverse "the most profound thing that's ever happened to the MCU". Joe commented on the symmetry of the post-credits tag–the original sound was taken from Iron Man (2008) when Downey's original MCU character Tony Stark is forging his initial Iron Man mask–and how it shows the duality of good and evil.

=== Filming ===
The additional footage was shot during production of Doomsday to appear exclusively in Encore. Doomsday filming occurred from April to September 2025, at Pinewood Studios in Buckinghamshire, England, with Newton Thomas Sigel as director of photography. Endgame editors Jeffrey Ford and Matthew Schmidt returned for Doomsday. The extended ending was shot on a recreated set to match how it appeared in Endgame, using the same camera lenses and lighting.

== Marketing ==
The trailer for Encore, released in August 2026, received 77 million views in 24 hours, the most for any re-release trailer and four times as much as the previous record holder, the trailer for the May 2026 re-release of the 1986 film Top Gun (19 million views). Encore's trailer was noted for its more saturated color grading compared to the film's original release.

== Release ==
=== Theatrical ===
Avengers Endgame: Encore was released in theaters on September 25, 2026. It received an IMAX release as well as Disney's Infinity Vision certification for premium large formats, informing audiences which theaters offer "the biggest, brightest, and most immersive cinematic experiences" and meet certain technical standards. In the United States, it opened in 3,060 theaters, of which 1,300 were Infinity Vision-premium formats and 390 IMAX screens. Beyond the additional footage, an introduction from Evans and Downey was featured, as well as the debut of a "silence your cellphones" ad featuring many of the Doomsday cast in costume. Two minutes of additional footage was included in all screenings of Encore, while Infinity Vision and IMAX releases also featured the three-to-four minute TVA mid-credits scene for a total of five-to-six minutes of additional footage.

=== Home media ===
Encore was released on Disney+ on November 13, 2026.

== Reception ==
=== Box office ===
Encore grossed $40.1 million in the United States and Canada, and $102.6 million in other territories, for a worldwide total of $142.9 million. This brought the worldwide total of Endgame to $2.942 billion, making the film the highest-grossing film of all time once again, surpassing the $2.923 billion gross of Avatar (2009).

Encore earned $3.8 million from previews, surpassing the $3.4 million from the 2025 re-release of Star Wars: Episode III – Revenge of the Sith (2005), and earned $26 million in its opening weekend, taking the top spot at the box office. Its $26 million weekend gross was the third-best opening for a re-release, after the $35.9 million for the 1997 re-release of Star Wars (1977) and the $30.2 million for the 2011 3D re-release of The Lion King (1994). IMAX and Infinity Vision screenings accounted for 60% of the weekend gross. In its second weekend, the film placed seventh at the box office, grossing $4.4 million, an 83% drop. Deadline Hollywood attributed this drop to the film losing most of its Infinity Vision screens after the first week, and to the appeal of the re-release being "clearly very front-loaded".

Encore earned $60 million during its opening weekend internationally, the second-highest opening for a re-release behind the $67 million for the 2012 3D re-release of Titanic (1997). It opened as the top film at the box office in over 30 markets and the top non-local film in at least 7 markets, while Disney estimated that Encore was the highest opening weekend ever for a re-release in over 30 markets. China was its top grossing market with $21.3 million, with other notable markets including Mexico ($6.1 million) and Brazil ($3.1 million). Encore became the highest-grossing re-release across the Latin America region as well as Malaysia, India, and Indonesia.

=== Critical response ===
Ahead of Encore's release, some commentators questioned whether the small amount of new footage would be worth the "hype" and justify re-watching the full film in theaters. Willa Rowe at Polygon felt Russo's comments about the new footage being critical to understanding Doomsday indicated that "little in the MCU since [the Infinity Saga ended] has mattered". Gizmodo's Cheryl Eddy wondered why the films and television series of the Multiverse Saga had not already been building to the story of Doomsday, stating that watching all of those projects had been a bad time investment if the Encore release was going to be a better primer for Doomsday.

Audiences surveyed by PostTrak gave Encore a 91% positive score and 81% said they would definitely recommend it. Rebecca Kivak at The Scranton Times-Tribune believed the re-release was warranted because it allowed audiences to experience Endgame in theaters, including new fans who may not have seen it in theaters originally. She said the new footage was a smart move and "goes a long way to set up the stakes for Doomsday and connect the dots in between films" following the lackluster reception to many of the MCU films post-Endgame. William Goodman writing for GQ said Encore delivered on the "lofty promise" that the new scenes were required viewing for Doomsday. While rewatching the film, Gizmodo's Germain Lussier said it recreated the feeling he originally had while watching Endgame in 2019, and he believed some moments with certain characters "hits a little differently in retrospect" due to subsequent Marvel Studios projects and real-world events. However, he felt it was "diabolical" for the Encore changes to begin right at the end of the film after having audience sit through the full film without changes, and he believed the extended ending "ruins the poignant moment a bit". Liz Declan at Screen Rant and Molly Freeman at MovieWeb were more negative, both feeling that the original "perfect" ending was undermined by the addition of the new footage. Declan repeated the criticism that these scenes should have been used in Multiverse Saga projects to set-up Doomsday rather than being added to Endgame.

There was commentary on, and speculation about, each of the new pieces of footage:

- Loki's appearance in the extended ending led to questions about when that scene takes place in relation to the ending of the second season of Loki (2023), which shows that character holding together the multiverse. Lussier felt this scene raised the most questions for Doomsday out of all the new footage, as well as questions about Rogers's appearance as an old man at the end of Endgame.
- The Banner mid-credits scene was compared to Jonathan Hickman's Avengers comics featuring an evil Hulk and a morality-free Banner from another dimension. Those elements preceded Hickman's "Time Runs Out" and "Secret Wars" storylines, which respectively inspired Doomsday and its sequel, Avengers: Secret Wars (2027). Parallels were also drawn between Doom collecting Banner and the Beyonder collecting heroes and villains for Battleworld in the original "Secret Wars" storyline, another inspiration for the two films. Kivak said the scene's found-footage style was effective and felt like a horror film. Polygon's Ryan Epps felt it did not make sense in Endgame and should have been a post-credits scene in the film Spider-Man: Brand New Day (2026) instead, giving a resolution to Banner's story in that film while bridging to the events of Doomsday.
- Writing for Entertainment Weekly, Nick Romano said the TVA mid-credits scene "tells a lot about where Avengers: Doomsday will go" and opining that the incursions seemed like a "narrative way to clean house" for elements of the Multiverse Saga that were not as popular with audiences. Lussier said it was the most important of all the new scenes.
- The post-credits tag was noted for the implication that Doom and Stark would have parallel or mirrored stories, with Goodman believing there would be a thematic connection of each character wanting to save the world on their terms. Lussier wondered if the threat of Doom was tied in any way to Stark using the Infinity Gauntlet to defeat Thanos at the end of Endgame. Romano felt the change in meaning for the tag made it "far less emotionally resonant" than the original version.
