= Infinity Vision =

Film theatre certification by Disney

- Type: Premium large format theater certification
- Inception: April 16, 2026; 7 months ago
- Manufacturer: The Walt Disney Company
- Website: www.infinityvisiontickets.com

Infinity Vision is a premium large format (PLF) theater certification program established by the Walt Disney Company. The program identifies theaters that meet Disney's technical standards for screen size, immersive audio, and certain brightness levels. As of October 2026, approximately 5,500 screens worldwide were Infinity Vision-certified. The program began in September 2026 with Avengers Endgame: Encore, a re-release of Avengers: Endgame (2019). Following the film's release, Disney began exploring partnerships with other studios to extend the certification program to their films.

== History ==
In April 2026, at CinemaCon, the Walt Disney Company announced that they would collaborate with global theatrical exhibition partners on a new certification program called Infinity Vision. The certification would indicate certain technical standards were met, such as screen size, laser projection, and premium immersive audio, with the aim of establishing more consistent premium theatrical standards globally. Additional offerings would also be available to exhibitors and audiences, with participating theaters receiving marketing support and permission to use the Infinity Vision branding. At the time of the announcement, Disney reported that 75 PLF theaters in the United States and 300 internationally were Infinity Vision-certified. By late June 2026, Disney had received over 7,500 applications from exhibitors to have their screens certified.

The program debuted in September 2026 with Avengers Endgame: Encore, a theatrical re-release of Avengers: Endgame (2019). The Infinity Vision fanfare was composed by Natalie Holt, who previously scored Marvel Studios' Disney+ series Loki (2021–2023).

In September 2026, Andrew Cripps, Disney's head of theatrical distribution, noted how there were approximately 320 premium large formats globally that could become Infinity Vision certified. Cripps said the intent was for Infinity Vision to be used in conjunction with theaters's in-house brands they had "spent a lot of time developing" to help market them, along with exhibitor agnostic formats such as Dolby Cinema, 4DX, ScreenX, and D-Box. He also announced that at least two exhibitors were actively working to upgrade theaters to become certified, including Cinemark, which was converting around 200 standard theaters in Latin America to its XD format. The following month, Bloomberg News reported that Disney had begun discussions with Paramount Pictures, Universal Pictures, Lionsgate Studios, and Sony Pictures Entertainment about extending Infinity Vision to their films. The studios were reportedly interested, although some were waiting for the December 2026 release of Avengers: Doomsday to assess the program's impact on box office performance. Bloomberg News also reported that approximately 5,500 screens globally were Infinity Vision-certified at that time.

== Technical specifications ==
In order for a theater to become certified for Infinity Vision, they must meet, at minimum, the following standards:

- A screen width of at least 45 feet (14 m)
- Dolby Surround 7.1 sound system or an immersive sound system, such as Dolby Atmos
- Brightness levels reaching either 14 footlamberts in 2D or 6 footlamberts in 3D

Fully immersive 4D and/or panoramic exhibition formats can also qualify for Infinity Vision certification.

== Films ==
- Avengers Endgame: Encore – September 2026
- Avengers: Doomsday – December 2026

== Reception ==
Many commentators felt Infinity Vision was created as a response to Dune: Part Three (2026), which releases the same day as Doomsday, having three weeks of exclusive access to IMAX screens. IMAX CFO Natasha Fernandes said the company viewed Infinity Vision as "a marketing play" for this reason. The Hollywood Reporter's James Hibberd predicted that Infinity Vision would not be mentioned again after Doomsday's release.

Following Endgame Encore's initial weekend opening, where the film played on 1,300 Infinity Vision screens, 43% of the total screens, and earned $13.5 million, 52% of the total weekend gross, Brian Welk of IndieWire felt those numbers were "exactly what [Disney] want to see and evidence that the branding" would continue to have an impact, believing Disney would continue using the branding for other films after Doomsday. Many premium formats also saw significant or record-breaking presale revenue for Avengers: Doomsday which was attributed in part to the formats having the Infinity Vision certification.
