= Wind River (film) =

2017 film by Taylor Sheridan

- Theatrical release poster
- Directed by: Taylor Sheridan
- Written by: Taylor Sheridan
- Produced by: Matthew George; Basil Iwanyk; Peter Berg; Wayne L. Rogers; Elizabeth A. Bell
- Starring: Jeremy Renner; Elizabeth Olsen
- Cinematography: Ben Richardson
- Edited by: Gary D. Roach
- Music by: Nick Cave; Warren Ellis
- Production companies: Acacia Entertainment; Savvy Media Holdings; Synergics Films; Thunder Road Pictures; Film 44; The Fyzz Facility; Riverstone Pictures; Voltage Pictures; Wild Bunch; Ingenious Media; Star Thrower Entertainment
- Distributed by: The Weinstein Company (Note: The film was only distributed by the Weinstein Company for its theatrical release, and was purchased for home distribution by Lionsgate following the Harvey Weinstein sexual abuse allegations.) (United States); STXinternational (United Kingdom); Metropolitan Filmexport (France)
- Release dates: January 21, 2017 (Sundance); August 4, 2017 (United States); August 30, 2017 (France); September 8, 2017 (United Kingdom)
- Running time: 107 minutes
- Countries: France; United Kingdom; United States
- Language: English
- Budget: $11 million
- Box office: $45 million

Wind River is a 2017 neo-Western crime film written and directed by Taylor Sheridan. It is the third film by Taylor Sheridan on the modern American West. The film stars Jeremy Renner and Elizabeth Olsen as a U.S. Fish and Wildlife Service tracker and an FBI agent, respectively, who try to solve a murder on the Wind River Indian Reservation in Wyoming. Gil Birmingham, Jon Bernthal, and Graham Greene also star.

Taylor Sheridan has said that he wrote the film to raise awareness of the issue of the high number of Indigenous women who are raped and murdered, both on and off reservations.

Wind River premiered at the 2017 Sundance Film Festival and was released in the United States on August 4, 2017. The film received generally positive reviews from critics and was a box office success, grossing $45 million against an $11 million budget. It was theatrically released by the Weinstein Company (TWC), but in October 2017, following the reporting of numerous sexual abuse allegations against Harvey Weinstein, the film's distribution rights for home media were acquired by Lionsgate.

== Plot ==
During the winter on the Wind River Indian Reservation, U.S. Fish and Wildlife Service Agent Cory Lambert discovers the frozen body of 18-year-old Natalie Hanson of the Northern Arapaho tribe. FBI special agent Jane Banner arrives to investigate the possible homicide. Banner learns from Natalie's father, Martin, that his daughter was dating a new boyfriend whose name he does not know.

Natalie's autopsy shows signs of blunt trauma and rape and confirms Lambert's deduction that Natalie died from pulmonary hemorrhage caused by inhaling subzero air. The medical examiner refuses to classify the death as a homicide, so Banner cannot get additional help from her supervisors.

Lambert is informed by Natalie's brother Chip that Natalie's boyfriend is Matt Rayburn, a security guard at a nearby oil-drilling site. Lambert and Banner soon find Matt's naked, mutilated body in the snow. Lambert reveals to Banner that his 16-year-old daughter Emily, Natalie's best friend, died in a similar manner to Natalie three years earlier, and the case remains unsolved.

Banner, tribal police Chief Ben Shoyo, and other law enforcement officers visit the drilling site, where Curtis, the security supervisor, and several security guards meet them. They claim Matt left a few days prior, following an argument with Natalie. One guard mentions they heard about Natalie's body being found, and Banner states that Natalie's name has not been released to the public. The guards claim they learned it by monitoring a police scanner. One of Banner's team notices the guards slowly surrounding them and draws his weapon. The confrontation quickly escalates into an armed standoff, which Banner defuses.

In a flashback, Matt's drunken colleagues barge into his trailer while he is in bed with Natalie. Matt is provoked to violence, and the other guards continue the attack while one guard, Pete, rapes Natalie. Matt is beaten to death, but his attempt to fight back allows Natalie to try to escape by running cross-country to the mobile home where her brother lives.

In the present, Lambert traces the tracks from where Matt's corpse was found back to the drilling camp. As Banner and the others approach Pete's trailer, Lambert radios a warning to Shoyo. Pete responds to a veiled warning from Curtis by firing a shotgun through the door, wounding Banner. A gunfight ensues, and Shoyo and the other officers are killed. As the remaining guards prepare to execute Banner, Lambert kills four with his rifle. A wounded Pete flees on foot, but Lambert apprehends him.

At Gannett Peak, Lambert forces Pete to confess before offering him the same chance Natalie had: try to stay alive by running to a distant road barefoot and wearing lightweight clothing. Pete runs but quickly succumbs as his lungs give out from the frigid air. Lambert visits Banner in the hospital and praises her toughness. He visits with Martin and they share grief over the deaths of their daughters.

A title card reads, "While missing person statistics are compiled for every other demographic, none exist for Native American women."

== Cast ==
- Jeremy Renner as U.S. Wildlife Agent Cory Lambert
- Elizabeth Olsen as FBI Agent Jane Banner
- Graham Greene as Chief Ben Shoyo
- Kelsey Asbille as Natalie Hanson
- Gil Birmingham as Martin Hanson
- Julia Jones as Wilma Lambert
- Martin Sensmeier as Chip Hanson
- Althea Sam as Annie Hanson
- Teo Briones as Casey Lambert
- Apesanahkwat as Dan Crowheart
- Tantoo Cardinal as Alice Crowheart
- Jon Bernthal as Matt Rayburn
- James Jordan as Pete Mickens
- Hugh Dillon as Curtis
- Matthew Del Negro as Dillon
- Blake Robbins as Tim
- Austin Grant as Carl
- Ian Bohen as Evan
- Eric Lange as Dr. Randy Whitehurst
- Tyler Laracca as Frank Walker
- Gerald Tokala Clifford as Sam Littlefeather

== Production ==
According to Taylor Sheridan, he was inspired to write this film because he learned about the "thousands of actual stories just like it," referring to the high number of Indigenous women who are victims of sexual assault and/or murder. He wrote and directed the movie to make more people aware of this problem.

The film is the third installment of Taylor Sheridan's trilogy of "the modern-day American frontier", the first being Sicario in 2015, and Hell or High Water the next year. Principal photography on the film began on March 12, 2016, in Utah and lasted until April 25, 2016.

== Release ==
The Weinstein Company acquired the distribution rights on May 13, 2016, during the 2016 Cannes Film Festival. In January 2017, it was announced that the company would no longer distribute the film, but the distribution deal was later finalized. It had a limited release on August 4, 2017, before going wide on August 18.

In October 2017, following reporting on the Harvey Weinstein sexual abuse scandal, Lionsgate announced that it would distribute the film on home media and streaming services. The Weinstein Company (TWC) name and logo were omitted from the credits, trailer, and packaging. As a result, The Weinstein Company finally stopped distributing the film. Taylor Sheridan had required that TWC be deleted from the materials, and demanded that all money Weinstein would have made on this work be donated to charity.

== Reception ==
=== Box office ===
Wind River grossed $33.8 million in the United States and Canada and $11.2 million in other territories for a worldwide total of $45 million, against a production budget of $11 million.

In the film's limited opening weekend, it made $161,558 from four theaters (a per-location average of $40,390, one of the best of 2017), finishing 29th at the box office. In its second week, the film expanded to 45 theaters and grossed $622,567. The film expanded to 694 theaters on August 18 and grossed $3 million, finishing tenth at the box office. The following week the film was added to an additional 1,401 theaters (for a total of 2,095) and made $4.6 million (an increase of 54.6%), finishing fourth at the box office. The film opened in another 507 theaters and made $5.7 million the following weekend, and an estimated $7.2 million over the four-day Labor Day weekend, finishing in the second spot at the U.S. box office consistently for the next 13 days. It was the sixth-highest grossing indie film of 2017.

=== Critical response ===
On review aggregator website Rotten Tomatoes, the film has an approval rating of 87% based on 254 reviews, with an average rating of 7.7/10. The website's critical consensus reads, "Wind River lures viewers into a character-driven mystery with smart writing, a strong cast, and a skillfully rendered setting that delivers the bitter chill promised by its title." On Metacritic, the film has a weighted average score of 73 out of 100, based on 44 critics, indicating "generally favorable reviews". Audiences polled by PostTrak gave the film a 90% overall positive score and a 70% "definite recommend".

Owen Gleiberman of Variety described Wind River as a "humanistic crime drama, though this one has more skill than excitement". Chris Plante of The Verge described it as "a thrilling, violent finale to the Hell or High Water and Sicario trilogy", and as "Coen brothers noir meets the case of the week."

Writing for Rolling Stone, Peter Travers praised Taylor Sheridan's direction and the cast, giving the film 3/4 stars. He wrote: "[It's] the set-up for what could have been a conventional whodunit – thankfully, Sheridan is allergic to all things conventional. To him, the action is character, and he's lucked out by finding actors who not only understand his approach but thrive on it." David Ehrlich of IndieWire gave the film a B, writing: "[If] Wind River shares Sheridan’s self-evident weaknesses, it also makes the most of his signature strengths. [...] Wind River may not blow you away, but this bitter, visceral, and almost paradoxically intense thriller knows what it takes to survive."

In a High Country News article titled "Why do white writers keep making films about Indian Country?", Native commentator Jason Asenap praised the film as "a thinking-person's thriller" full of complex characters, and describes the film's focus on missing Native American women as "admirable." He criticizes the film for perpetuating the "dying Indians" motif:

"at least in Hollywood, the Indians die. To this day, the Indians die, and not just physically, but culturally. Simpson and Sheridan are invested in making us see how America has screwed Native people, but to the point of rubbing it in our faces. Is it so terrible to live in one’s own homeland? It may be hard to get out, but it certainly feels condescending for a non-Native to write as much."

Taylor Sheridan was also criticized for claiming the film "actually changed a law" in an interview with The Hollywood Reporter, referring to the Violence Against Women Act (VAWA) Reauthorization Act, which President Biden signed into law in 2022. "Yellowstone creator Taylor Sheridan’s attempt to take credit for the passage of VAWA is gross and completely discredits years of tireless advocacy from the Native community,” Native rights attorney Mary Kathryn Nagle (Cherokee) published on IllumiNative, a Native woman-led racial & social justice organization.

=== Accolades ===
Award	Date of ceremony	Category	Recipients	Result	Ref.
Cannes Film Festival	May 28, 2017	Prix Un Certain Regard	Taylor Sheridan	Nominated	
Cannes Film Festival	May 28, 2017	Un Certain Regard for Best Director	Taylor Sheridan	Won	
Cannes Film Festival	May 28, 2017	Caméra d'Or	Taylor Sheridan	Nominated	
National Board of Review	November 28, 2017	Top Ten Independent Film	Wind River	Won	
Directors Guild of America	February 3, 2018	Outstanding Directing - First-Time Feature Film	Taylor Sheridan	Nominated	
Satellite Awards	February 11, 2018	Best Actor	Jeremy Renner	Nominated	
Saturn Awards	June 27, 2018	Best Thriller Film	Wind River	Nominated	

== Sequel ==
In November 2022, Kari Skogland signed on to direct a sequel titled Wind River: The Next Chapter, from a screenplay by Patrick Massett and John Zinman, and starring Martin Sensmeier. Principal photography took place from March 15 to April 24, 2023 in Calgary, Canada. The sequel was confirmed in August 2023. Neither Jeremy Renner nor Elizabeth Olsen is confirmed to star.
