= Manhunt (Under the Dome) =

- Under the Dome episode
- Episode no.: Season 1 Episode 3
- Directed by: Paul Edwards
- Written by: Rick Cleveland
- Original air date: July 8, 2013

Guest appearances
- Katie Garfield as Girl #1; Chantelle Mussenden as Girl #2; Darryl Booker as Townsman #1; Nick Basta as Townsman #2; Bill Eudaly as Older Man; Deborah Childs as Older Woman; Andrew Vogel as Carter

Episode chronology
← Previous "The Fire"	Next → "Outbreak"
- Under the Dome (season 1)

"Manhunt" is the third episode of the first season of the CBS drama Under the Dome. The episode aired on July 8, 2013.

The episode received mixed reviews from critics, and also sparked controversy due to the show's reference to The Simpsons Movie. Upon airing, the episode was watched by 10.71 million viewers and received an 18–49 rating of 2.7.

== Plot ==
Deputy Paul Randolph, who accidentally killed Deputy Freddy, escapes his jail cell and locks Linda inside. Big Jim organizes a search party to find Paul by recruiting other townsmen and a reluctant Barbie, while Linda resolves to find Paul on her own. In the woods, Paul sneaks up on Barbie and Big Jim to hold them at gunpoint and Linda shows up and shoots Paul, prompting Big Jim to designate her as the new Sheriff.

Julia tails Junior into the tunnels, where he is looking to find a way out; he hits the barrier of the dome and his flashlight explodes, but Julia is able to help him and use her matches to guide them out to safety.

Meanwhile, Joe and Norrie find themselves in the middle of a party as Ben (John Elvis) invites all of the teenagers in town to charge their electronics using Joe’s generator. The party ends when the generator blows, and Carolyn and Alice find Norrie and see her and Joe touch hands and start seizing simultaneously, repeating the same cryptic phrase "Pink stars are falling”.

== Reception ==
=== Ratings ===
The episode was broadcast on CBS on July 8, 2013, and garnered an audience of 10.71 million viewers. It achieved an 18–49 rating/share of 2.7/8, securing the top spot in its timeslot and for the entire night. The episode is down slightly from the previous episode, which received a 2.9 rating and 11.81 million viewers.

The show was watched by 1.784 million viewers in Canada, ranking first for the night and the week.

=== Critical reception ===
The episode received generally negative reviews by critics. Matt Fowler of IGN gave the episode a negative review, pointing out that the quality of the series has slipped over the weeks, saying "I think the fact that each episode is taking place over the course of one day is already beginning to take its toll on the series. Because we're in Day 3 now and things are moving slowly and stupidly." He also commented on the characters' lack of worry about the dome, saying "this week, more than before, the dome seemed totally unimportant. And things weren't bad enough for the citizens for there to be any crisis to care about. Aside from the inevitable bacon shortage that is."

Andrea Reiher of Zap2it gave the episode a negative review, calling it "a little slow." She also commented on Angie and Junior's part in the story, saying "We'd love it if eventually she'd escape and get to interact with some other people, but we aren't optimistic." Darren Franich of Entertainment Weekly also commented on the episode's lack of pace and quality, saying "This episode was light on Dome mystery and heavy on inter-character drama."

Doug Anderson of The Guardian gave the episode a negative review, saying "the series is much longer than it is deep. After last night’s third instalment, in which not much happened, I feel disinclined to persevere, notwithstanding the whiff of food for thought involving “the enemy within” and the nature of fear. As yet, no Truman Show exit door in the backdrop, leading to an external reality or hidden hands directing events."

Tim Surrette of TV.com gave the episode a negative review as well, saying the episode "was not a fun hour of television to sit through, even for hate-watchers. I'm getting some serious Terra Nova vibes here with weird separated teen storylines, mundane problems-of-the-week, and one-dimensional characters, when the focus should be on THE DOME! No one is facing consequences for their stupid actions, the town is mostly going about its business as if nothing has happened, and those damned teenagers are running around in packs like rabid jackals. Under the Dome has yet to touch on any sense of a theme as it trudges through hollow weekly shenanigans and destroys its source material."

=== Controversy ===
A scene in the episode has kids referencing The Simpsons Movie, which led to speculation that the series was based on the film. Stephen King responded by saying "Never saw it. I was just totally gob smacked and blindsided when people started to say, oh, The Simpsons already did this."
