= Michael Lynne =

American film executive (1941–2019)

- Born: April 23, 1941; Brooklyn, New York
- Died: March 24, 2019 (aged 77); Manhattan, New York City, U.S.
- Education: Brooklyn College; Columbia University
- Occupation: Film executive

Michael Lynne (April 23, 1941 – March 24, 2019) was an American film executive, best known as the former co-chair of New Line Cinema alongside its founder Robert Shaye.

== Biography ==
Michael Lynne graduated from Brooklyn College (1961) and held a Juris Doctor from Columbia University. After a chance encounter with law-school acquaintance Shaye, who had subsequently founded New Line, Lynne joined the company as outside legal counsel in the early 1980s. In 1990, he was appointed president and chief operating officer of the studio, and in 2001, he was made co-chairman and co-chief executive officer.

Lynne started to collect wine and bought two vineyards on Long Island in 1999 and 2000.

In February 2008, Shaye and Lynne were dismissed from New Line in advance of its restructuring as a unit of Warner Bros. That June, the two formed a new independent film company called Unique Features.

Lynne died of cancer on March 24, 2019, aged 77.
