= Robert Shaye =

American film producer and director

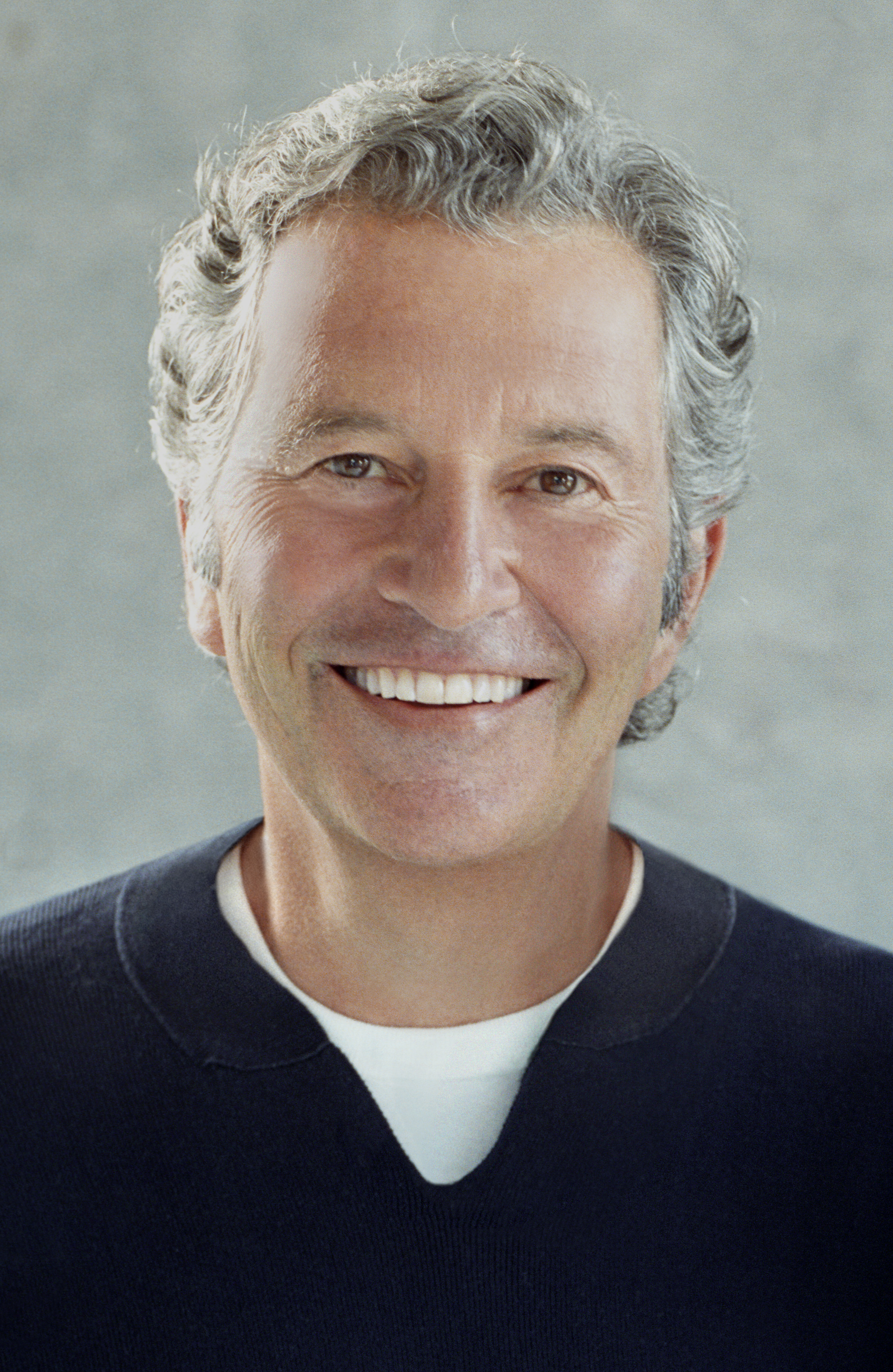
- Born: 1939 (age 86–87); Detroit, Michigan, U.S.
- Education: University of Michigan; Columbia Law School
- Occupations: Film producer; film executive; director; actor
- Years active: 1964–present
- Known for: Founding New Line Cinema
- Relatives: Lin Shaye (sister)

Robert Shaye (born 1939) is an American film producer, film executive, director and actor. He founded New Line Cinema in 1967, the company behind the A Nightmare on Elm Street films and The Lord of the Rings trilogy.

== Early life and education ==
Shaye was born in Detroit. He studied business at the University of Michigan and earned a law degree from Columbia Law School in 1964.

== Film distribution and production ==
=== New Line Cinema ===
New Line initially distributed foreign and art films to college audiences. Its releases included Reefer Madness and films by John Waters, including Pink Flamingos.

He produced Wes Craven's A Nightmare on Elm Street (1984). The film's success led to a series of sequels. Its subsequent expansion encompassed films such as Hairspray, House Party and The Mask, while Fine Line Features handled films aimed at art-house audiences.

Turner Broadcasting acquired New Line in 1994. New Line became part of Time Warner in 1996 through its acquisition of Turner.

In 1998, Shaye backed Peter Jackson's adaptation of The Lord of the Rings. Jackson had been seeking financing for two films; Shaye supported a three-film version. The three films were shot together. Shaye received an executive producer credit on all three films, released between 2001 and 2003.

Shaye and fellow New Line executive Michael Lynne left the company in February 2008, when it was integrated into Warner Bros.' operations.

=== Later work ===
In 2008, Shaye and Lynne established Unique Features, which worked with Warner Bros. on distribution. His subsequent credits included executive producer on The Mortal Instruments: City of Bones (2013) and producer on When the Bough Breaks (2016). He also worked as an executive producer on television productions including Shadowhunters and The Liberator.

== Directing and writing ==
Shaye's short film Image dates from 1964. His feature Book of Love screened at Cannes in 1990 and opened theatrically in the United States in 1991. He subsequently directed the science-fiction film The Last Mimzy (2007) and the thriller Ambition (2019).

His writing credits include the original scenario for Stunts (1977) and a story credit for Alone in the Dark (1982).

== Acting ==
Shaye has also made screen appearances. He played himself in Wes Craven's New Nightmare (1994), Principal Shaye in Freddy vs. Jason (2003), and a detective in Cellular (2004).

== Personal life ==
Actress Lin Shaye is his sister. He married Eva Lindsten. They have two daughters.

== Selected filmography ==
The following selection distinguishes production credits from directing and writing credits.

Year	Film	Credit	Sources
1977	Stunts	Executive producer; original scenario	
1981	Polyester	Executive producer	
1982	Alone in the Dark	Producer; story	
1983	Xtro	Executive producer	
1984	A Nightmare on Elm Street	Producer	
1988	Hairspray	Executive producer	
1990 / 1991	Book of Love	Director	
1991	Freddy's Dead: The Final Nightmare	Producer	
1994	Wes Craven's New Nightmare	Executive producer	
2000	Frequency	Executive producer	
2001	The Lord of the Rings: The Fellowship of the Ring	Executive producer	
2002	The Lord of the Rings: The Two Towers	Executive producer	
2003	The Lord of the Rings: The Return of the King	Executive producer	
2007	The Last Mimzy	Director; executive producer	
2013	The Mortal Instruments: City of Bones	Executive producer	
2016	When the Bough Breaks	Producer	
2019	Ambition	Director; producer	
2021	Night Teeth	Executive producer	
2023 (U.S. theatrical release)	Space Oddity	Executive producer	
