= Kari Skogland =

Canadian filmmaker

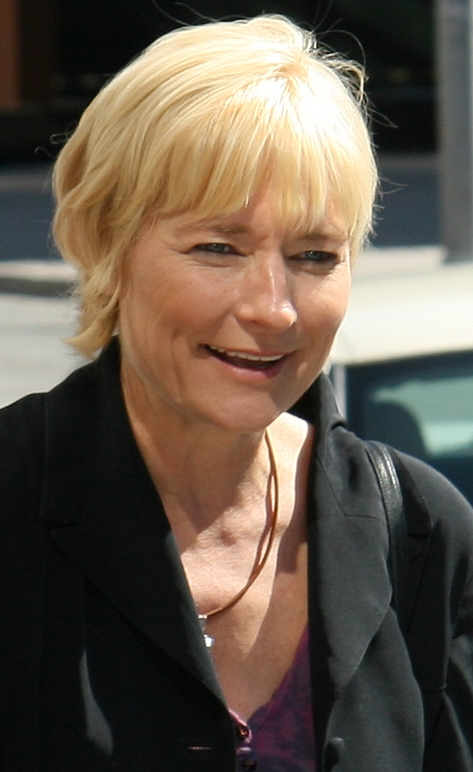
- Skogland at the 2008 Toronto International Film Festival
- Born: Ottawa, Ontario, Canada
- Occupations: Film director; television director; screenwriter; film producer; television producer
- Years active: 1994–present

Kari Skogland is a Canadian filmmaker. In 2016, she co-founded independent production company Mad Rabbit. She directed all of the episodes of The Falcon and the Winter Soldier, a television miniseries for Marvel Studios.

== Career ==
Skogland started as an editor. Then she moved on to directing, starting with award-winning television commercials and music videos. Then she became a director of television shows, beginning with an episode of 1994's Dead at 21 and five episodes of 1996's Traders. Traders was nominated for several Geminis including Best Director, and won Best Series.

Her first film, The Size of Watermelons, won the Silver Award at WorldFest Houston. Her CBC film White Lies was nominated for several Geminis and an International Emmy and won a Tout Ecran. She also directed 50 Dead Men Walking starring Sir Ben Kingsley, Jim Sturgess and Rose McGowan in March 2009. She directed episodes of Boardwalk Empire, The Borgias and in 2014 the miniseries Sons of Liberty and episodes of the History Channel's Vikings. In 2017 and 2018, she directed several memorable episodes of Hulu's original series, The Handmaid's Tale, including the Season 1 finale. She described her process for directing the show as, "Communication, curiosity and being open to an outcome that is different from what I have planned."

Skogland has spoken out about the glass ceiling for women directors in the film industry. Speaking about the production of The Handmaid's Tale in 2018, she said, "People say they can’t find female directors, but the reason for that is there’s no access, no entry point. They don’t appear overnight—you have to create a space where they can grow and be discovered."

In 2021, Skogland was announced as the new director for the upcoming Cleopatra biopic for Sony Pictures, starring Gal Gadot, replacing Patty Jenkins who would still produce the film, though it never came to fruition. In November 2022, Skogland signed on to direct Wind River: The Next Chapter.

== Personal life ==
Born in Ottawa, Ontario, Canada, Kari Skogland is married to film editor Jim Munro. They met circa 1979 when Skogland applied to be Munro's assistant, which led to Skogland getting the job and the two also starting a personal relationship. They have two daughters, MacKenzie and Aislin.

== Filmography ==
=== Film ===
| Year | Title | Director | Writer | Producer |
|---|---|---|---|---|
| 1996 | The Size of Watermelons | Yes | No | Yes |
| 1997 | Men with Guns | Yes | No | No |
| 2000 | I'll Wave Back | No | Yes | No |
| 2002 | Liberty Stands Still | Yes | Yes | No |
| 2004 | Chicks with Sticks | Yes | No | No |
| 2007 | The Stone Angel | Yes | Yes | Yes |
| 2008 | Fifty Dead Men Walking | Yes | Yes | Yes |
| TBA | Wind River: The Next Chapter † | Yes | No | No |

Direct-to-video

- Children of the Corn 666: Isaac's Return (1999)

=== Television ===
| Year | Title | Director | Executive producer | Notes |
|---|---|---|---|---|
| 1994 | Dead at 21 | Yes | No | Episode "Gone Daddy Gone" |
| 1994–95 | Catwalk | Yes | No | 6 episodes |
| 1995 | Heritage Minutes | Yes | No | 2 episodes |
| 1996 | Traders | Yes | No | 5 episodes |
| 1997 | La Femme Nikita | Yes | No | Episode "Charity" |
| 1998 | Sins of the City | Yes | No | Episode "The Hurt Business" |
| 1998 | The Crow: Stairway to Heaven | Yes | No | 2 episodes |
| 2000 | Family Law | Yes | No | Episode "The Witness" |
| 2001–03 | Queer as Folk | Yes | No | 3 episodes |
| 2004 | The L Word | Yes | No | Episode "Listen Up" |
| 2005 | Terminal City | Yes | No | 2 episodes |
| 2009–12 | The Listener | Yes | No | 8 episodes |
| 2009 | Cra$h & Burn | Yes | No | 2 episodes |
| 2010 | Shattered | Yes | Yes | Directed 2 episodes |
| 2011 | Being Erica | Yes | No | Episode "Being Ethan" |
| 2011 | Endgame | Yes | No | Episode "Polar Opposites" |
| 2012 | Boardwalk Empire | Yes | No | Episode "Blue Bell Boy" |
| 2012–13 | The Borgias | Yes | No | 6 episodes |
| 2013 | The Killing | Yes | No | Episode "Seventeen" |
| 2013 | Under the Dome | Yes | No | Episodes "Outbreak", "The Endless Thirst" |
| 2013 | Longmire | Yes | No | Episode "A Good Death is Hard to Find" |
| 2013 | Copper | Yes | No | Episode "Beautiful Dreamer" |
| 2014 | Once Upon a Time in Wonderland | Yes | No | Episode "And They Lived..." |
| 2014 | Vikings | Yes | No | 2 episodes |
| 2014 | Power | Yes | No | 2 episodes |
| 2015 | Penny Dreadful | Yes | No | Episode "Memento Mori" |
| 2015 | Tyrant | Yes | No | Episode "The Other Brother" |
| 2015 | Fear the Walking Dead | Yes | No | Episodes "Not Fade Away", "Cobalt" |
| 2015 | The Bastard Executioner | Yes | No | Episode "Piss Profit / Proffidwyr Troeth" |
| 2016 | House of Cards | Yes | No | Episode "Chapter 50" |
| 2016 | The Americans | Yes | No | Episode "The Rat" |
| 2016–17 | The Walking Dead | Yes | No | 2 episodes |
| 2017 | The Punisher | Yes | No | Episode "Resupply" |
| 2017–18 | The Handmaid's Tale | Yes | No | 5 episodes |
| 2018 | Condor | Yes | No | 2 episodes |
| 2019 | NOS4A2 | Yes | Yes | 2 episodes |
| 2025 | Smoke | Yes | Yes | Episode "Pilot" |

Miniseries

| Year | Title | Director | Executive producer | Notes |
|---|---|---|---|---|
| 2010 | Bloodletting & Miraculous Cures | Yes | No | 2 episodes |
| 2015 | Sons of Liberty | Yes | Co-executive | |
| 2019 | The Rook | Yes | No | 2 episodes |
| 2019 | The Loudest Voice | Yes | Yes | Directed 3 episodes |
| 2021 | The Falcon and the Winter Soldier | Yes | Yes | |

TV movies

| Year | Title | Director | Producer | Writer |
|---|---|---|---|---|
| 1998 | Nothing Too Good for a Cowboy | Yes | No | No |
| 1998 | White Lies | Yes | No | No |
| 2000 | The Courage to Love | Yes | No | No |
| 2000 | Nature Boy | Yes | Yes | Yes |
| 2001 | Zebra Lounge | Yes | No | No |
| 2003 | Riverworld | Yes | No | No |
| 2006 | Banshee | Yes | No | No |
| 2006 | Rapid Fire | Yes | No | No |

== Partial Accolades ==
- Directors Guild of Canada Awards - Outstanding Achievement In Direction - Television Series - Winner - Terminal City - Episode 5
