= List of Talking Dead episodes =

Talking Dead is a live television aftershow in which host Chris Hardwick discusses episodes of the AMC television series The Walking Dead, Fear the Walking Dead and The Walking Dead: World Beyond with guests, including celebrity fans, cast members, and crew from the series.

== Series overview ==
Season	Episodes	Originally released	
Season	Episodes	First released	Last released
1	13	October 16, 2011	March 18, 2012
2	16	October 14, 2012	March 31, 2013
3	16	October 13, 2013	March 30, 2014
4	16	October 12, 2014	March 29, 2015
5	30	October 11, 2015	October 2, 2016
6	28	October 23, 2016	October 15, 2017
7	31	October 22, 2017	September 30, 2018
8	20	October 7, 2018	September 29, 2019
9	30	October 6, 2019	June 13, 2021
10	29	August 22, 2021	November 20, 2022

AMC officially counts the first season of Talking Dead as season 2 and each subsequent season one number higher than is listed here. This is so that the season numbers for episodes of Talking Dead match the season numbers for episodes of The Walking Dead that they discuss.

== Episodes ==
=== Season 1 (2011–12) ===
These episodes discuss season two of The Walking Dead.

No. overall	No. in season	Episode discussed	Guests	Original release date	U.S. viewers (millions)
The Walking Dead season 2
1	1	"What Lies Ahead"	Patton Oswalt and James Gunn with Robert Kirkman via satellite	October 16, 2011	1.16
2	2	"Bloodletting"	Brian Posehn and Robert Kirkman	October 23, 2011	1.11
3	3	"Save the Last One"	Felicia Day and Jon Heder with Gale Anne Hurd	October 30, 2011	1.00
4	4	"Cherokee Rose"	Matt Mogk and Matt Besser with Steven Yeun and Lauren Cohan via satellite	November 6, 2011	1.00
5	5	"Chupacabra"	Aisha Tyler and Michael Rooker	November 13, 2011	1.16
6	6	"Secrets"	Kevin Smith and Paul F. Tompkins	November 20, 2011	N/A
7	7	"Pretty Much Dead Already"	Greg Nicotero, Robert Kirkman and Norman Reedus with Laurie Holden and Alice Cooper via phone	November 27, 2011	1.07
8	8	"Nebraska"	Dave Navarro and Glen Mazzara	February 12, 2012	N/A
9	9	"Triggerfinger"	Steven Yeun and Paget Brewster	February 19, 2012	1.12
10	10	"18 Miles Out"	Michael Zegen and Kevin Smith with Scott Wilson	February 26, 2012	0.96
11	11	"Judge, Jury, Executioner"	Greg Nicotero, Scott Ian and Dana Gould	March 4, 2012	N/A
12	12	"Better Angels"	Lauren Cohan and Zachary Levi	March 11, 2012	1.33
13	13	"Beside the Dying Fire"	Robert Kirkman, Glen Mazzara and Laurie Holden with Fred Armisen via phone	March 18, 2012	4.30

=== Season 2 (2012–13) ===
These episodes discuss season three of The Walking Dead. This season featured a special "season 3 preview" episode which aired in July 2012.

No. overall	No. in season	Episode discussed	Guests	Original release date	U.S. viewers (millions)
The Walking Dead season 3
14	1	"Seed"	Glen Mazzara and Danai Gurira	October 14, 2012	2.14
15	2	"Sick"	Wil Wheaton with Nick Gomez	October 21, 2012	1.88
16	3	"Walk with Me"	David Alpert and Bobak Ferdowsi	October 28, 2012	1.75
17	4	"Killer Within"	IronE Singleton and Gale Anne Hurd	November 4, 2012	2.00
18	5	"Say the Word"	Greg Nicotero and Dalton Ross	November 11, 2012	1.93
19	6	"Hounded"	Joel Madden and Sarah Silverman	November 18, 2012	1.92
20	7	"When the Dead Come Knocking"	CM Punk and Yvette Nicole Brown	November 25, 2012	1.99
21	8	"Made to Suffer"	Robert Kirkman and Damon Lindelof	December 2, 2012	2.25
22	9	"The Suicide King"	Kevin Smith and Steven Yeun	February 10, 2013	4.14
23	10	"Home"	Robert Kirkman and Joe Manganiello with Lew Temple; Musical guest: Baby Bee	February 17, 2013	4.01
24	11	"I Ain't a Judas"	Retta and Scott Adsit with Emily Kinney	February 24, 2013	3.50
25	12	"Clear"	Aisha Tyler and Scott Porter	March 3, 2013	3.75
26	13	"Arrow on the Doorpost"	Keegan-Michael Key and Eliza Dushku with Lauren Cohan; Musical guest: Jamie N Commons	March 10, 2013	3.43
27	14	"Prey"	Kumail Nanjiani and Todd McFarlane with Laurie Holden; Musical guest: Voxhaul Broadcast	March 17, 2013	3.71
28	15	"This Sorrowful Life"	Reggie Watts, Greg Nicotero and David Morrissey with Michael Rooker	March 24, 2013	4.49
29	16	"Welcome to the Tombs"	Norman Reedus, Yvette Nicole Brown and Chad L. Coleman	March 31, 2013	5.16

=== Season 3 (2013–14) ===
These episodes discuss season four of The Walking Dead.

No. overall	No. in season	Episode discussed	Guests	Original release date	U.S. viewers (millions)
The Walking Dead season 4
30	1	"30 Days Without an Accident"	Scott M. Gimple and Nathan Fillion	October 13, 2013	5.10
31	2	"Infected"	Doug Benson, Greg Nicotero and Hayley Williams	October 20, 2013	4.85
32	3	"Isolation"	Gale Anne Hurd, Jack Osbourne and Marilyn Manson	October 27, 2013	4.09
33	4	"Indifference"	Chris Jericho and Gillian Jacobs	November 3, 2013	4.34
34	5	"Internment"	Adam Savage and Breckin Meyer	November 10, 2013	4.27
35	6	"Live Bait"	Ike Barinholtz and David Morrissey	November 17, 2013	4.07
36	7	"Dead Weight"	Paul Scheer, Fred Armisen and Jose Pablo Cantillo	November 24, 2013	3.43
37	8	"Too Far Gone"	Robert Kirkman and Lauren Cohan with Scott Wilson	December 1, 2013	6.02
38	9	"After"	Greg Nicotero and Danai Gurira	February 9, 2014	5.85
39	10	"Inmates"	Joe Kernen and Jim Gaffigan with Alanna Masterson	February 16, 2014	4.77
40	11	"Claimed"	Michael Cudlitz and Mindy Kaling	February 23, 2014	4.72
41	12	"Still"	Norman Reedus, Emily Kinney and J. B. Smoove	March 2, 2014	5.01
42	13	"Alone"	Lauren Cohan and Sonequa Martin-Green	March 9, 2014	4.62
43	14	"The Grove"	Melissa McBride, CM Punk and Yvette Nicole Brown	March 16, 2014	5.42
44	15	"Us"	Josh McDermitt and Steven Yeun	March 23, 2014	5.29
45	16	"A"	Andrew Lincoln and Scott M. Gimple	March 30, 2014	7.34

=== Season 4 (2014–15) ===
These episodes discuss season five of The Walking Dead. This season introduced live polls as well as a live interactive quiz where fans compete online on their mobile phones, tablets, or computer.

No. overall	No. in season	Episode discussed	Guests	Original release date	U.S. viewers (millions)
The Walking Dead season 5
46	1	"No Sanctuary"	Greg Nicotero, Scott M. Gimple and Conan O'Brien	October 12, 2014	6.88
47	2	"Strangers"	Matt L. Jones and Chad L. Coleman	October 19, 2014	5.13
48	3	"Four Walls and a Roof"	Slash and Mary Lynn Rajskub with Andrew J. West	October 26, 2014	5.32
49	4	"Slabtown"	Emily Kinney, Ana Gasteyer and John Barrowman	November 2, 2014	5.98
50	5	"Self Help"	Michael Cudlitz, Josh McDermitt and Gale Anne Hurd	November 9, 2014	5.63
51	6	"Consumed"	CM Punk, Yvette Nicole Brown and Tyler James Williams	November 16, 2014	5.36
52	7	"Crossed"	Paul F. Tompkins, Christian Serratos and Sonequa Martin-Green	November 23, 2014	4.18
53	8	"Coda"	Keegan-Michael Key and Robert Kirkman with Emily Kinney	November 30, 2014	6.57
54	9	"What Happened and What's Going On"	Greg Nicotero and Chad L. Coleman	February 8, 2015	2.85
55	10	"Them"	Robin Lord Taylor, Seth Gilliam and Lauren Cohan	February 15, 2015	5.07
56	11	"The Distance"	Paul Feig and Danai Gurira	February 22, 2015	4.86
57	12	"Remember"	Alanna Masterson, Timothy Simons and Denise Huth	March 1, 2015	5.63
58	13	"Forget"	Kevin Smith, Ross Marquand and Alexandra Breckenridge	March 8, 2015	5.73
59	14	"Spend"	Steven Yeun, Josh McDermitt and Tyler James Williams	March 15, 2015	5.93
60	15	"Try"	Chandler Riggs, Yvette Nicole Brown and Gale Anne Hurd	March 22, 2015	6.02
61	16	"Conquer"	Norman Reedus, Melissa McBride and Lennie James	March 29, 2015	7.53

=== Season 5 (2015–16) ===
These episodes discuss season six of The Walking Dead and season two of Fear the Walking Dead. This season also hosted an Ultimate Fan Contest where fans can submit clips on why they are the ultimate fan. Greg Raiewski was chosen as the winner to be a guest in the fourteenth episode. Episodes 24 and 25 were pre-recorded due to Hardwick's wedding and honeymoon.

No. overall	No. in season	Episode discussed	Guests	Original release date	U.S. viewers (millions)
The Walking Dead season 6
62	1	"First Time Again"	Scott M. Gimple, Greg Nicotero and Ethan Embry	October 11, 2015	5.66
63	2	"JSS"	Kevin Smith, Paul Bettany and Katelyn Nacon	October 18, 2015	4.31
64	3	"Thank You"	Yvette Nicole Brown and Damon Lindelof	October 25, 2015	6.20
65	4	"Here's Not Here"	Lennie James, John Carroll Lynch and Josh Gad	November 1, 2015	4.64
66	5	"Now"	Alexandra Breckenridge and Zachary Levi	November 8, 2015	4.94
67	6	"Always Accountable"	Michael Rooker, Paget Brewster and Doug Benson	November 15, 2015	3.11
68	7	"Heads Up"	Ken Jeong and Gale Anne Hurd with Steven Yeun and Scott M. Gimple	November 22, 2015	3.21
69	8	"Start to Finish"	Jason Alexander, Robert Kirkman and Tovah Feldshuh	November 29, 2015	2.73
70	9	"No Way Out"	Carrie Underwood, Greg Nicotero and Benedict Samuel	February 14, 2016	6.44
71	10	"The Next World"	Danai Gurira, Austin Nichols and Nathan Fillion with an appearance by Yvette Nicole Brown	February 21, 2016	5.69
72	11	"Knots Untie"	Tom Payne, Kid Cudi and Lauren Cohan	February 28, 2016	4.89
73	12	"Not Tomorrow Yet"	Alanna Masterson, Ross Marquand and J. B. Smoove	March 6, 2016	4.84
74	13	"The Same Boat"	Paul Feig and Melissa McBride with Alicia Witt	March 13, 2016	5.06
75	14	"Twice as Far"	Christian Serratos, Josh McDermitt and Greg Raiewski	March 20, 2016	5.33
76	15	"East"	Yvette Nicole Brown and Denise Huth with Sonequa Martin-Green	March 27, 2016	5.00
77	16	"Last Day on Earth"	Norman Reedus, Scott M. Gimple and Robert Kirkman with Jeffrey Dean Morgan	April 3, 2016	6.38
Fear the Walking Dead season 2
78	17	"Monster"	Cliff Curtis, Dave Erickson and Hozier	April 10, 2016	2.36
79	18	"We All Fall Down"	Kim Dickens, Lou Diamond Phillips and Lyndie Greenwood	April 17, 2016	1.94
80	19	"Ouroboros"	Chris Jericho and Lorenzo James Henrie with Michelle Ang	April 24, 2016	1.69
81	20	"Blood in the Streets"	Yvette Nicole Brown and Colman Domingo	May 1, 2016	1.64
82	21	"Captive"	Alycia Debnam-Carey with Jesse McCartney and Daniel Zovatto	May 8, 2016	1.60
83	22	"Sicut Cervus"	Mercedes Mason, Jim Gaffigan and Tamera Mowry-Housley	May 15, 2016	1.60
84	23	"Shiva"	Gale Anne Hurd and Cliff Curtis with Marlene Forte and Rubén Blades	May 22, 2016	0.96
85	24	"Grotesque"	Kim Dickens, Dave Erickson and Danay Garcia	August 21, 2016	1.35
86	25	"Los Muertos"	Kim Dickens, Colman Domingo and Ethan Embry	August 28, 2016	1.22
87	26	"Do Not Disturb"	Jonah Ray with Kelly Blatz and Karen Bethzabe	September 4, 2016	1.13
88	27	"Pablo & Jessica"	Reggie Watts, Danay Garcia and Paul Calderon	September 11, 2016	1.06
89	28	"Pillar of Salt"	Mercedes Mason, Dylan Sprayberry and David Alpert	September 18, 2016	1.11
90	29	"Date of Death"	Drew Scott, Lorenzo James Henrie and Elizabeth Rodriguez	September 25, 2016	1.14
91	30	"Wrath" "North"	Robert Kirkman and Alycia Debnam-Carey with Lorenzo James Henrie and Colman Domingo via satellite	October 2, 2016	1.28

=== Season 6 (2016–17) ===
These episodes discuss season seven of The Walking Dead and season three of Fear the Walking Dead. During the season five finale, Hardwick announced that the 90-minute season premiere would take place at Hollywood Forever Cemetery. Chandler Riggs was originally scheduled to appear in the season premiere but was rescheduled to the seventh episode. In addition, some last-minute replacements occurred after the original guest was unable to attend the taping, with Jonah Ray replacing Sarah Hyland in the sixth episode and Cooper Andrews replacing Chris D'Elia in the tenth episode. Another Ultimate Fan Contest was held during the mid-season finale where the selected finalists made their case to Robert Kirkman and Norman Reedus, and explain why they are the ultimate Walking Dead fan. Jill Robi and Brendan Orban-Griggs were chosen as the winners of the contest.

No. overall	No. in season	Episode discussed	Guests	Original release date	U.S. viewers (millions)
The Walking Dead season 7
92	1	"The Day Will Come When You Won't Be"	Andrew Lincoln, Norman Reedus, Steven Yeun, Lauren Cohan, Danai Gurira, Michael Cudlitz, Sonequa Martin-Green, Josh McDermitt, Christian Serratos, Ross Marquand, Jeffrey Dean Morgan, Robert Kirkman and Scott M. Gimple	October 23, 2016	7.57
93	2	"The Well"	Dana Gould, Chloe Bennet and Khary Payton	October 30, 2016	4.29
94	3	"The Cell"	Scott Aukerman with Christine Evangelista	November 6, 2016	4.06
95	4	"Service"	Lou Diamond Phillips, Ron Funches and David Alpert	November 13, 2016	3.80
96	5	"Go Getters"	Kevin Smith, Xander Berkely and Tom Payne	November 20, 2016	3.74
97	6	"Swear"	Alanna Masterson, Jonah Ray and Cassandra Peterson	November 27, 2016	3.78
98	7	"Sing Me a Song"	Chandler Riggs, Josh Homme and Gale Ann Hurd	December 4, 2016	3.77
99	8	"Hearts Still Beating"	Norman Reedus and Robert Kirkman with Austin Nichols	December 11, 2016	4.31
100	9	"Rock in the Road"	Greg Nicotero, Khary Payton and DeAngelo Williams	February 12, 2017	4.80
101	10	"New Best Friends"	Cooper Andrews and Seth Gilliam with Pollyanna McIntosh	February 19, 2017	4.05
102	11	"Hostiles and Calamities"	Josh McDermitt, Austin Amelio and Lil Jon	February 26, 2017	3.94
103	12	"Say Yes"	Yvette Nicole Brown and Denise Huth	March 5, 2017	3.56
104	13	"Bury Me Here"	Lennie James via satellite, Scott M. Gimple and Michael Rooker with Karl Makinen	March 12, 2017	3.96
105	14	"The Other Side"	Christian Serratos and Steven Ogg with a surprise appearance by Josh McDermitt	March 19, 2017	1.97
106	15	"Something They Need"	Alanna Masterson, Lauren Cohan, Brandenn Orban-Griggs and Jill Robi	March 26, 2017	2.14
107	16	"The First Day of the Rest of Your Life"	Norman Reedus, Scott M. Gimple and Jeffrey Dean Morgan with Sonequa Martin-Green and a surprise appearance by Michael Cudlitz	April 2, 2017	2.55
Fear the Walking Dead season 3
108	17	"Eye of the Beholder" "The New Frontier"	Cliff Curtis, Alycia Debnam-Carey and Dave Erickson	June 4, 2017	0.98
109	18	"TEOTWAWKI"	Alycia Debnam-Carey and Chris Sullivan	June 11, 2017	0.94
110	19	"100"	Rubén Blades and Drew Scott with Jesse Borrego	June 18, 2017	0.94
111	20	"Burning in Water, Drowning in Flame"	Danay Garcia, Sam Underwood and Nicole "Snooki" Polizzi	June 25, 2017	0.70
112	21	"Red Dirt"	Gale Anne Hurd, Dayton Callie and Sinbad	July 2, 2017	0.91
113	22	"The Unveiling" "Children of Wrath"	Kim Dickens, Michael Greyeyes and Colman Domingo with Mercedes Mason	July 9, 2017	0.88
114	23	"Minotaur" "The Diviner"	Colman Domingo and Yvette Nicole Brown	September 10, 2017	0.64
115	24	"La Serpiente"	Colman Domingo and Lisandra Tena	September 17, 2017	0.70
116	25	"Brother's Keeper"	Mercedes Mason, Neil Perry and Sam Underwood	September 24, 2017	0.84
117	26	"This Land Is Your Land"	Alycia Debnam-Carey and Aisha Tyler	October 1, 2017	0.91
118	27	"El Matadero"	Lisa Edelstein, Rubén Blades and Mercedes Mason	October 8, 2017	0.95
119	28	"Things Bad Begun" "Sleigh Ride"	Kim Dickens and Colman Domingo	October 15, 2017	0.87

=== Season 7 (2017–18) ===
These episodes discuss season eight of The Walking Dead and season four of Fear the Walking Dead. The special two-hour premiere was held live at the Greek Theatre in Los Angeles and featured all twenty of the main cast for the season as well as executive producers and former cast members. The sixteenth episode discussed the crossover event that featured the season 8 finale and season 4 premiere of The Walking Dead and Fear the Walking Dead, respectively. Ashley Weidman was the winner of the third Walking Dead Ultimate Fan contest.

No. overall	No. in season	Episode discussed	Guests	Original release date	U.S. viewers (millions)
The Walking Dead season 8
120	1	"Mercy"	Current cast: Andrew Lincoln, Norman Reedus, Lauren Cohan, Chandler Riggs, Danai Gurira, Melissa McBride, Lennie James, Alanna Masterson, Josh McDermitt, Christian Serratos, Seth Gilliam, Ross Marquand, Jeffrey Dean Morgan, Austin Amelio, Tom Payne, Xander Berkeley, Khary Payton, Steven Ogg, Katelyn Nacon and Pollyanna McIntosh Executive producers: Scott M. Gimple, Robert Kirkman, Greg Nicotero, Gale Ann Hurd and David Alpert Former cast: Sonequa Martin-Green, Emily Kinney, Scott Wilson, IronE Singleton and Michael Rooker Video messages: Steven Yeun and Sarah Wayne Callies	October 22, 2017	4.90
121	2	"The Damned"	Scott M. Gimple, Chris Sullivan and Alanna Masterson with Tom Payne via satellite	October 29, 2017	3.25
122	3	"Monsters"	Norman Reedus with Ross Marquand and Jordan Woods-Robinson with an appearance by Juan Gabriel Pareja	November 5, 2017	3.12
123	4	"Some Guy"	Robert Kirkman, Lil Jon and Khary Payton with Cooper Andrews via satellite	November 12, 2017	3.12
124	5	"The Big Scary U"	Steven Ogg, Desus Nice and Lisa Edelstein	November 19, 2017	2.62
125	6	"The King, the Widow, and Rick"	Melissa McBride and Kevin Smith with Avi Nash	November 26, 2017	3.22
126	7	"Time for After"	Josh McDermitt, Austin Amelio and David Mazouz	December 3, 2017	2.75
127	8	"How It's Gotta Be"	Scott M. Gimple, Khary Payton and Yvette Nicole Brown	December 10, 2017	3.36
128	9	"Honor"	Greg Nicotero and Chandler Riggs	February 25, 2018	3.59
129	10	"The Lost and the Plunderers"	Robert Kirkman and Ross Marquand with Katelyn Nacon	March 4, 2018	2.65
130	11	"Dead or Alive Or"	Denise Huth and Steve Agee with R. Keith Harris	March 11, 2018	2.32
131	12	"The Key"	Andrew J. West and Yvette Nicole Brown with Jayne Atkinson	March 18, 2018	2.66
132	13	"Do Not Send Us Astray"	Alanna Masterson with Jason Douglas	March 25, 2018	1.60
133	14	"Still Gotta Mean Something"	Pollyanna McIntosh and Ron Funches with Joshua Mikel plus an appearance from Khary Payton	April 1, 2018	2.37
134	15	"Worth"	Christian Serratos, Steven Ogg and Ashley Weidman plus a surprise call from Seth Rogen	April 8, 2018	2.53
The Walking Dead / Fear the Walking Dead crossover
135	16	"Wrath" "What's Your Story?"	Andrew Lincoln, Lennie James, Jeffrey Dean Morgan, Danay Garcia, Garret Dillahunt, Robert Kirkman and Scott M. Gimple	April 15, 2018	2.00
Fear the Walking Dead season 4
136	17	"Another Day in the Diamond"	Kim Dickens with Kevin Zegers	April 22, 2018	0.66
137	18	"Good Out Here"	Danay Garcia, Andrew Chambliss, Ian B. Goldberg and Evan Gamble	April 29, 2018	0.64
138	19	"Buried"	Maggie Grace, Sebastian Sozzi and Jonah Ray	May 6, 2018	0.52
139	20	"Laura"	Jenna Elfman and Yvette Nicole Brown	May 13, 2018	0.67
140	21	"Just in Case"	Garret Dillahunt, Gale Anne Hurd and Lights	May 20, 2018	0.59
141	22	"The Wrong Side of Where You Are Now"	Colman Domingo and Kevin Zegers	June 3, 2018	0.52
142	23	"No One's Gone"	Alycia Debnam-Carey and Colman Domingo with Kim Dickens	June 10, 2018	0.74
143	24	"People Like Us"	Ian Goldberg, Danay Garcia, and Yvette Nicole Brown	August 12, 2018	0.48
144	25	"Close Your Eyes"	Andrew Chambliss, Deborah Joy Winans and Mercedes Mason	August 19, 2018	0.41
145	26	"The Code"	Drew Scott, Mo Collins and Daryl Mitchell	August 26, 2018	0.43
146	27	"Weak"	Colman Domingo, Jenna Elfman and Lisa Edelstein	September 2, 2018	0.62
147	28	"Blackjack"	Colman Domingo and Danay Garcia	September 9, 2018	0.60
148	29	"MM 54"	Tonya Pinkins, Lou Diamond Phillips and Sinbad	September 16, 2018	0.76
149	30	"I Lose People..."	Jenna Elfman, Mo Collins and Aaron Stanford	September 23, 2018	0.77
150	31	"... I Lose Myself"	Lennie James, Andrew Chambliss, Ian Goldberg, Maggie Grace, and Scott M. Gimple	September 30, 2018	0.82

=== Season 8 (2018–19) ===
These episodes discuss season nine of The Walking Dead and select episodes of season five of Fear the Walking Dead.

No. overall	No. in season	Episode discussed	Guests	Original release date	U.S. viewers (millions)
The Walking Dead season 9
151	1	"A New Beginning"	Norman Reedus, Melissa McBride, Jeffrey Dean Morgan, Greg Nicotero and Angela Kang	October 7, 2018	2.22
152	2	"The Bridge"	Tom Payne, Katelyn Nacon and Deborah Joy Winans	October 14, 2018	1.69
153	3	"Warning Signs"	Pollyanna McIntosh and Sydney Park	October 21, 2018	1.87
154	4	"The Obliged"	Angela Kang, Michael Rooker and Jeffrey Dean Morgan	October 28, 2018	1.82
155	5	"What Comes After"	Andrew Lincoln, Melissa McBride, Scott M. Gimple and Yvette Nicole Brown	November 4, 2018	2.70
156	6	"Who Are You Now?"	Lauren Ridloff, Angel Theory and Drew Scott	November 11, 2018	2.12
157	7	"Stradivarius"	Michael Cudlitz, Dan Fogler and Matt Lintz plus an appearance from Madison Lintz	November 18, 2018	2.09
158	8	"Evolution"	Ross Marquand, Robert Kirkman and Tom Payne	November 25, 2018	2.29
159	9	"Adaptation"	Greg Nicotero, Norman Reedus and Jeffrey Dean Morgan	February 10, 2019	2.31
160	10	"Omega"	Gale Anne Hurd, Nadia Hilker and Eleanor Matsuura	February 17, 2019	1.66
161	11	"Bounty"	Khary Payton, Cooper Andrews and Alanna Masterson	February 24, 2019	1.71
162	12	"Guardians"	Seth Gilliam, Christian Serratos and Ron Funches plus an appearance from Alanna Masterson	March 3, 2019	1.70
163	13	"Chokepoint"	Lauren Ridloff, Ryan Hurst and Ultimate Fan Kristi Ferguson	March 10, 2019	2.03
164	14	"Scars"	Denise Huth and Yvette Nicole Brown	March 17, 2019	1.56
165	15	"The Calm Before"	Scott M. Gimple, Avi Nash and Brett Butler	March 24, 2019	1.01
166	16	"The Storm"	Angela Kang and Melissa McBride	March 31, 2019	1.03
Fear the Walking Dead season 5
167	17	"Here to Help"	Colman Domingo, Alycia Debnam-Carey, Ian B. Goldberg and Andrew Chambliss	June 2, 2019	0.46
168	18	"Is Anybody Out There?"	Ian Goldberg, Jenna Elfman and Daryl Mitchell	July 21, 2019	0.37
169	19	"Channel 4"	Danay García, Karen David and Maggie Grace	August 11, 2019	0.25
170	20	"End of the Line"	Jenna Elfman, Austin Amelio, Ian Goldberg and Andrew Chambliss	September 29, 2019	0.29

=== Season 9 (2019–21) ===
These episodes discuss season ten of The Walking Dead, and selected episodes of season six of Fear the Walking Dead and season one of The Walking Dead: World Beyond. The March 15 episode was canceled due to the COVID-19 pandemic. Beginning with the March 22 episode, Hardwick and the guests speak from their homes via webcam. The sixteenth episode discussed the crossover event that featured the season 10 finale and season 1 premiere of The Walking Dead and The Walking Dead: World Beyond, respectively.

No. overall	No. in season	Episode discussed	Guests	Original release date	U.S. viewers (millions)
The Walking Dead season 10
171	1	"Lines We Cross"	Norman Reedus, Melissa McBride, Jeffrey Dean Morgan, Cailey Fleming, Greg Nicotero and Angela Kang	October 6, 2019	1.62
172	2	"We Are the End of the World"	Ryan Hurst, Thora Birch and Yvette Nicole Brown	October 13, 2019	1.35
173	3	"Ghosts"	Angela Kang and Chris Jericho with Melissa McBride and Ross Marquand via satellite	October 20, 2019	1.24
174	4	"Silence the Whisperers"	Michael Cudlitz, Cassady McClincy and Matt Jones	October 27, 2019	1.25
175	5	"What It Always Is"	Eleanor Matsuura, Angel Theory and Chris Sullivan	November 3, 2019	1.16
176	6	"Bonds"	Jaime King and Sinbad	November 10, 2019	1.23
177	7	"Open Your Eyes"	Chandler Riggs and Avi Nash	November 17, 2019	1.38
178	8	"The World Before"	Seth Gilliam, Juan Javier Cardenas and Deborah Joy Winans	November 24, 2019	1.13
179	9	"Squeeze"	Lauren Ridloff, Cooper Andrews and Michael E. Satrazemis	February 23, 2020	0.52
180	10	"Stalker"	Thora Birch, Denise Huth and Nico Tortorella	March 1, 2020	0.55
181	11	"Morning Star"	Norman Reedus and Greg Nicotero	March 8, 2020	1.27
182	12	"Walk with Us"	–	Cancelled	N/A
183	13	"What We Become"	Yvette Nicole Brown and Scott M. Gimple with Danai Gurira	March 22, 2020	1.49
184	14	"Look at the Flowers"	Ryan Hurst, Jeffrey Dean Morgan and Ron Funches	March 29, 2020	1.39
185	15	"The Tower"	Paola Lázaro, Khary Payton and Josh McDermitt with Angela Kang via phone	April 5, 2020	1.39
The Walking Dead / The Walking Dead: World Beyond crossover
186	16	"A Certain Doom" "Brave"	Norman Reedus, Melissa McBride, Lauren Cohan, Ryan Hurst and Nicolas Cantu	October 4, 2020	0.68
Fear the Walking Dead season 6 part 1 / The Walking Dead: World Beyond season 1
187	17	"The Key" "Madman Across the Water"	Andrew Chambliss, Garret Dillahunt, Alexa Mansour and Nicolas Cantu	November 1, 2020	N/A
188	18	"Honey" "Shadow Puppets"	Maggie Grace, Christine Evangelista, Aliyah Royale and Nico Tortorella	November 8, 2020	N/A
189	19	"Bury Her Next to Jasper's Leg" "Truth or Dare"	Jenna Elfman, Annet Mahendru, Colby Minifie and Michael Cudlitz	November 15, 2020	N/A
190	20	"Damage from the Inside" "The Sky Is a Graveyard"	Lennie James, Colman Domingo, Aliyah Royale, Hal Cumpston and Annet Mahendru	November 22, 2020	0.25
191	21	"The Deepest Cut" "In This Life"	Aliyah Royale, Alexa Mansour, Nicolas Cantu, Hal Cumpston, Nico Tortorella and Matt Negrete	November 29, 2020	N/A
The Walking Dead season 10 bonus episodes
192	22	"Home Sweet Home"	Lauren Cohan, Angel Theory and Corey Reed	February 28, 2021	1.04
193	23	"Find Me"	Melissa McBride, Lynn Collins and Nicole Mirante-Matthews	March 7, 2021	0.80
194	24	"One More"	Seth Gilliam, Ross Marquand, Robert Patrick and Jim Barnes	March 14, 2021	0.70
195	25	"Splinter"	Khary Payton, Paola Lázaro, Vivian Tse and Ron Funches	March 21, 2021	0.81
196	26	"Diverged"	Melissa McBride, Cooper Andrews, David Boyd and Drew Scott	March 28, 2021	0.62
197	27	"Here's Negan"	Jeffrey Dean Morgan, Hilarie Burton, Yvette Nicole Brown and David Leslie Johnson-McGoldrick	April 4, 2021	0.40
Fear the Walking Dead season 6 part 2
198	28	"The Door"	Garret Dillahunt, Zoe Colletti, Lennie James and Jenna Elfman	April 11, 2021	0.13
199	29	"J.D."	Jenna Elfman, Christine Evangelista, Keith Carradine and Aisha Tyler	May 16, 2021	0.39
200	30	"The Beginning"	Colman Domingo, Zoe Colletti, Andrew Chambliss and Ian B. Goldberg	June 13, 2021	0.40

=== Season 10 (2021–22) ===
These episodes discuss season eleven of The Walking Dead, season seven of Fear the Walking Dead and season two of The Walking Dead: World Beyond.

No. overall	No. in season	Episode discussed	Guests	Original release date	U.S. viewers (millions)
The Walking Dead season 11 part 1
201	1	"Acheron: Part I"	Paola Lázaro and Angela Kang with Jeffrey Dean Morgan via satellite	August 22, 2021	0.87
202	2	"Acheron: Part II"	Josh McDermitt and Emily Kinney with Lauren Cohan via satellite	August 29, 2021	0.78
203	3	"Hunted"	Callan McAuliffe and Ryan Hurst	September 5, 2021	0.73
204	4	"Rendition"	Hilarie Burton and Alanna Masterson with Lynn Collins via satellite	September 12, 2021	0.70
205	5	"Out of the Ashes"	Cassady McClincy and Clarke Wolfe with Ross Marquand via satellite	September 19, 2021	0.66
206	6	"On the Inside"	Yvette Nicole Brown with Lauren Ridloff via satellite	September 26, 2021	0.70
The Walking Dead season 11 part 1 / The Walking Dead: World Beyond season 2
207	7	"Promises Broken" "Konsekans"	Alexa Mansour and Ron Funches with Josh Hamilton via satellite	October 3, 2021	0.40
208	8	"For Blood" "Foothold"	Ritchie Coster and Aliyah Royale with Seth Gilliam and Scott M. Gimple via satellite	October 10, 2021	0.30
Fear the Walking Dead season 7 part 1 / The Walking Dead: World Beyond season 2
209	9	"The Beacon" "Exit Wounds"	Aisha Tyler and Nicolas Cantu with Gus Halper via satellite	October 17, 2021	0.30
210	10	"The Portrait" "Death and the Dead"	Karen David, Nico Tortorella and Deborah Joy Winans	November 28, 2021	0.21
211	11	"PADRE" "The Last Light"	Lennie James, Pollyanna McIntosh and Ian B. Goldberg with Matt Negrete and Kim Dickens via satellite	December 5, 2021	0.27
The Walking Dead season 11 part 2
212	12	"No Other Way"	Lauren Cohan, Lynn Collins and Angela Kang via satellite	February 20, 2022	0.76
213	13	"New Haunts"	Michael James Shaw, Teo Rapp-Olsson and Yvette Nicole Brown via satellite	February 27, 2022	0.66
214	14	"Rogue Element"	Michael Cudlitz and Clarke Wolfe with Josh McDermitt via satellite	March 6, 2022	0.69
215	15	"The Lucky Ones"	Deborah Joy Winans with Khary Payton and Ross Marquand via satellite	March 13, 2022	0.71
216	16	"Warlords"	Diallo Riddle with Seth Gilliam and Michael Biehn via satellite	March 20, 2022	0.70
217	17	"The Rotten Core"	Teo Rapp-Olsson and Chris Jericho with Angela Kang via satellite	March 27, 2022	0.62
218	18	"Trust"	Ian Anthony Dale, Paola Lázaro and Emily Kinney	April 3, 2022	0.70
219	19	"Acts of God"	Norman Reedus, Lauren Cohan and Josh Hamilton	April 10, 2022	0.34
Fear the Walking Dead season 7 part 2
220	20	"Follow Me"	Ian Goldberg, Reggie Watts and Warren Snipe	April 17, 2022	0.15
221	21	"Gone"	Kim Dickens and Danay García with Andrew Chambliss via satellite	June 5, 2022	0.33
The Walking Dead season 11 part 3
222	22	"Lockdown"	Norman Reedus, Greg Nicotero and Yvette Nicole Brown	October 2, 2022	0.33
223	23	"A New Deal"	Margot Bingham, Michael James Shaw and Teo Rapp-Olsson	October 9, 2022	0.34
224	24	"Variant"	Ross Marquand, Laila Robins and Terry Crews	October 16, 2022	0.28
225	25	"What's Been Lost"	Eleanor Matsuura, Josh Hamilton and Aisha Tyler	October 23, 2022	0.32
226	26	"Outpost 22"	Lauren Cohan, Lauren Ridloff and Rick Beato	October 30, 2022	0.32
227	27	"Faith"	Josh McDermitt and Khary Payton	November 6, 2022	0.32
228	28	"Family"	Michael James Shaw, Cooper Andrews and Denise Huth	November 13, 2022	0.38
229	29	"Rest in Peace"	Current cast: Norman Reedus, Melissa McBride, Lauren Cohan, Christian Serratos, Josh McDermitt, Seth Gilliam, Ross Marquand, Khary Payton, Cooper Andrews, Eleanor Matsuura, Lauren Ridloff, Cailey Fleming, Nadia Hilker, Cassady McClincy, Angel Theory, Paola Lázaro, Michael James Shaw, Josh Hamilton, Laila Robins, Jeffrey Dean Morgan and Margot Bingham Executive producers: Scott M. Gimple, Angela Kang and Greg Nicotero Surprise guests: Chandler Riggs, Sarah Wayne Callies, Danai Gurira and Michael Cudlitz Video messages: Diallo Riddle, Paul Feig, Carrie Underwood, CM Punk, Aisha Tyler, Terry Crews, Steven Yeun and Andrew Lincoln Red carpet pre-show: Okea Eme-Akwari, Lennie James, Emily Kinney, Michael Rooker, Yvette Nicole Brown and Demi Lovato with video messages by Addy Miller, IronE Singleton, Laurie Holden and Madison Lintz Other: Alanna Masterson, Callan McAuliffe, Kien Michael Spiller and Antony Azor	November 20, 2022	1.04

== Specials ==
No.	Title	Guests	Original release date	U.S. viewers (millions)
1	"Season 3 Preview"	Drew Carey, Glen Mazzara, Gale Anne Hurd, David Alpert, Robert Kirkman and Chandler Riggs via phone	July 8, 2012	1.59
2	"Season 5 Preview"	Scott M. Gimple and Aisha Tyler	July 6, 2014	2.40
3	"Season 6 Preview"	Scott M. Gimple and Jorge Garcia	August 23, 2015	4.18
4	"Talking Fear"	Kim Dickens, Cliff Curtis and Dave Erickson	October 4, 2015	2.38
5	"Season 7 Preview"	Austin Amelio and Yvette Nicole Brown	August 14, 2016	1.60
6	"Season 8 Preview"	Jeffrey Dean Morgan, Lennie James and Scott M. Gimple	September 10, 2017	1.92
7	"Season 9 Preview"	Khary Payton, Tom Payne and Angela Kang; guest-hosted by Yvette Nicole Brown	August 5, 2018	1.26
8	"Season 10 Preview"	Angela Kang, Khary Payton and Josh McDermitt	August 11, 2019	0.94
9	"The Walking Dead Universe Preview Special"	Angela Kang, Andrew Chambliss, Matt Negrete, Lennie James, Alexa Mansour, Lauren Cohan, Nico Tortorella and Colby Minifie	September 27, 2020	0.52
10	"Extended Season 10 Preview"	Paola Lázaro, Seth Gilliam, Angela Kang and Clarke Wolfe	February 21, 2021	N/A
11	"Season 11 Preview"	Angela Kang, Michael James Shaw and Norman Reedus	August 15, 2021	0.56
12	"The Walking Dead Universe Preview"	Terry Crews, Jillian Bell, Anthony Edwards, Michael Satrazemis and Scott M. Gimple	August 7, 2022	0.34
13	"The Final Episodes Preview"	Cooper Andrews and Angela Kang with Paola Lázaro via satellite	September 25, 2022	0.40
