= List of Fear the Walking Dead episodes =

American horror television series episode list

Fear the Walking Dead is an American post-apocalyptic horror drama television series created by Robert Kirkman and Dave Erickson. It is a companion series to The Walking Dead, which is based on the comic book series of the same name by Robert Kirkman, Tony Moore, and Charlie Adlard. It premiered on the cable network AMC on August 23, 2015.

During the course of the series, 113 episodes of Fear the Walking Dead aired over eight seasons, between August 23, 2015, and November 19, 2023.

== Series overview ==
Season	Episodes	Originally released	
Season	Episodes	First released	Last released
1	6	August 23, 2015	October 4, 2015
2	15	April 10, 2016	October 2, 2016
3	16	June 4, 2017	October 15, 2017
4	16	April 15, 2018	September 30, 2018
5	16	June 2, 2019	September 29, 2019
6	16	October 11, 2020	June 13, 2021
7	16	October 17, 2021	June 5, 2022
8	12	May 14, 2023	November 19, 2023

== Episodes ==
=== Season 1 (2015) ===
No. overall	No. in season	Title	Directed by	Written by	Original release date	U.S. viewers (millions)
1	1	"Pilot"	Adam Davidson	Robert Kirkman & Dave Erickson	August 23, 2015	10.13
2	2	"So Close, Yet So Far"	Adam Davidson	Marco Ramirez	August 30, 2015	8.18
3	3	"The Dog"	Adam Davidson	Jack LoGiudice	September 13, 2015	7.19
4	4	"Not Fade Away"	Kari Skogland	Meaghan Oppenheimer	September 20, 2015	6.62
5	5	"Cobalt"	Kari Skogland	David Wiener	September 27, 2015	6.66
6	6	"The Good Man"	Stefan Schwartz	Robert Kirkman & Dave Erickson	October 4, 2015	6.86

=== Season 2 (2016) ===
No. overall	No. in season	Title	Directed by	Written by	Original release date	U.S. viewers (millions)
7	1	"Monster"	Adam Davidson	Dave Erickson	April 10, 2016	6.67
8	2	"We All Fall Down"	Adam Davidson	Story by : Brett C. Leonard & Kate Barnow; Teleplay by : Kate Barnow	April 17, 2016	5.58
9	3	"Ouroboros"	Stefan Schwartz	Alan Page	April 24, 2016	4.73
10	4	"Blood in the Streets"	Michael Uppendahl	Kate Erickson	May 1, 2016	4.80
11	5	"Captive"	Craig Zisk	Carla Ching	May 8, 2016	4.41
12	6	"Sicut Cervus"	Kate Dennis	Brian Buckner	May 15, 2016	4.49
13	7	"Shiva"	Andrew Bernstein	David Wiener	May 22, 2016	4.39
14	8	"Grotesque"	Daniel Sackheim	Kate Barnow	August 21, 2016	3.86
15	9	"Los Muertos"	Deborah Chow	Alan Page	August 28, 2016	3.66
16	10	"Do Not Disturb"	Michael McDonough	Lauren Signorino	September 4, 2016	2.99
17	11	"Pablo & Jessica"	Uta Briesewitz	Kate Erickson	September 11, 2016	3.40
18	12	"Pillar of Salt"	Gerardo Naranjo	Carla Ching	September 18, 2016	3.62
19	13	"Date of Death"	Christoph Schrewe	Brian Buckner	September 25, 2016	3.49
20	14	"Wrath"	Stefan Schwartz	Kate Barnow	October 2, 2016	3.67
21	15	"North"	Andrew Bernstein	Dave Erickson	October 2, 2016	3.05

=== Season 3 (2017) ===
No. overall	No. in season	Title	Directed by	Written by	Original release date	U.S. viewers (millions)
22	1	"Eye of the Beholder"	Andrew Bernstein	Dave Erickson	June 4, 2017	3.11
23	2	"The New Frontier"	Stefan Schwartz	Mark Richard	June 4, 2017	2.70
24	3	"TEOTWAWKI"	Deborah Chow	Ryan Scott	June 11, 2017	2.50
25	4	"100"	Alex García López	Alan Page	June 18, 2017	2.40
26	5	"Burning in Water, Drowning in Flame"	Daniel Stamm	Suzanne Heathcote	June 25, 2017	2.50
27	6	"Red Dirt"	Courtney Hunt	Wes Brown	July 2, 2017	2.19
28	7	"The Unveiling"	Jeremy Webb	Mark Richard	July 9, 2017	2.62
29	8	"Children of Wrath"	Andrew Bernstein	Jami O'Brien	July 9, 2017	2.40
30	9	"Minotaur"	Stefan Schwartz	Dave Erickson & Mike Zunic	September 10, 2017	2.14
31	10	"The Diviner"	Paco Cabezas	Ryan Scott	September 10, 2017	2.14
32	11	"La Serpiente"	Josef Wladyka	Mark Richard & Lauren Signorino	September 17, 2017	1.99
33	12	"Brother's Keeper"	Alrick Riley	Wes Brown	September 24, 2017	2.08
34	13	"This Land Is Your Land"	Meera Menon	Suzanne Heathcote	October 1, 2017	2.36
35	14	"El Matadero"	Stefan Schwartz	Alan Page	October 8, 2017	2.23
36	15	"Things Bad Begun"	Andrew Bernstein	Jami O'Brien	October 15, 2017	2.23
37	16	"Sleigh Ride"	Andrew Bernstein	Dave Erickson & Mark Richard	October 15, 2017	2.23

=== Season 4 (2018) ===
No. overall	No. in season	Title	Directed by	Written by	Original release date	U.S. viewers (millions)
38	1	"What's Your Story?"	John Polson	Scott M. Gimple & Andrew Chambliss & Ian Goldberg	April 15, 2018	4.09
39	2	"Another Day in the Diamond"	Michael E. Satrazemis	Andrew Chambliss & Ian Goldberg	April 22, 2018	3.07
40	3	"Good Out Here"	Dan Liu	Shintaro Shimosawa	April 29, 2018	2.71
41	4	"Buried"	Magnus Martens	Alex Delyle	May 6, 2018	2.49
42	5	"Laura"	Michael E. Satrazemis	Anna Fishko	May 13, 2018	2.46
43	6	"Just in Case"	Daisy von Scherler Mayer	Richard Naing	May 20, 2018	2.31
44	7	"The Wrong Side of Where You Are Now"	Sarah Boyd	Melissa Scrivner Love	June 3, 2018	1.97
45	8	"No One's Gone"	Michael E. Satrazemis	Ian Goldberg & Andrew Chambliss	June 10, 2018	2.32
46	9	"People Like Us"	Magnus Martens	Anna Fishko	August 12, 2018	1.88
47	10	"Close Your Eyes"	Michael E. Satrazemis	Shintaro Shimosawa	August 19, 2018	1.86
48	11	"The Code"	Tara Nicole Weyr	Andrew Chambliss & Alex Delyle	August 26, 2018	1.83
49	12	"Weak"	Colman Domingo	Kalinda Vazquez	September 2, 2018	1.52
50	13	"Blackjack"	Sharat Raju	Ian Goldberg & Richard Naing	September 9, 2018	1.71
51	14	"MM 54"	Lou Diamond Phillips	Anna Fishko & Shintaro Shimosawa	September 16, 2018	1.87
52	15	"I Lose People..."	David Barrett	Kalinda Vazquez	September 23, 2018	2.03
53	16	"... I Lose Myself"	Michael E. Satrazemis	Andrew Chambliss & Ian Goldberg	September 30, 2018	2.13

=== Season 5 (2019) ===
No. overall	No. in season	Title	Directed by	Written by	Original release date	U.S. viewers (millions)
54	1	"Here to Help"	Michael E. Satrazemis	Ian Goldberg & Andrew Chambliss	June 2, 2019	1.97
55	2	"The Hurt That Will Happen"	Jessica Lowrey	Alex Delyle	June 9, 2019	1.69
56	3	"Humbug's Gulch"	Colman Domingo	Ashley Cardiff	June 16, 2019	1.76
57	4	"Skidmark"	Tara Nicole Weyr	Samir Mehta	June 23, 2019	1.66
58	5	"The End of Everything"	Michael E. Satrazemis	Andrew Chambliss & Ian Goldberg	June 30, 2019	1.71
59	6	"The Little Prince"	Sharat Raju	Mallory Westfall	July 7, 2019	1.49
60	7	"Still Standing"	Marta Cunningham	Richard Naing	July 14, 2019	1.39
61	8	"Is Anybody Out There?"	Michael E. Satrazemis	Michael Alaimo	July 21, 2019	1.60
62	9	"Channel 4"	Dan Liu	David Johnson	August 11, 2019	1.40
63	10	"210 Words Per Minute"	Ron Underwood	Ian Goldberg & Andrew Chambliss	August 18, 2019	1.37
64	11	"You're Still Here"	K.C. Colwell	Mallory Westfall & Alex Delyle	August 25, 2019	1.44
65	12	"Ner Tamid"	Michael E. Satrazemis	Andrew Chambliss & Ian Goldberg	September 1, 2019	1.14
66	13	"Leave What You Don't"	Daisy von Scherler Mayer	Ashley Cardiff & Nick Bernardone	September 8, 2019	1.45
67	14	"Today and Tomorrow"	Sydney Freeland	Richard Naing & David Johnson	September 15, 2019	1.31
68	15	"Channel 5"	David Barrett	Michael Alaimo & Samir Mehta	September 22, 2019	1.34
69	16	"End of the Line"	Michael E. Satrazemis	Ian Goldberg & Andrew Chambliss	September 29, 2019	1.51

=== Season 6 (2020–21) ===
No. overall	No. in season	Title	Directed by	Written by	Original release date	U.S. viewers (millions)
70	1	"The End Is the Beginning"	Michael E. Satrazemis	Andrew Chambliss & Ian Goldberg	October 11, 2020	1.59
71	2	"Welcome to the Club"	Lennie James	Nazrin Choudhury	October 18, 2020	1.55
72	3	"Alaska"	Colman Domingo	Mallory Westfall	October 25, 2020	1.50
73	4	"The Key"	Ron Underwood	David Johnson	November 1, 2020	1.28
74	5	"Honey"	Michael E. Satrazemis	Ashley Cardiff	November 8, 2020	1.24
75	6	"Bury Her Next to Jasper's Leg"	Sharat Raju	Alex Delyle	November 15, 2020	1.27
76	7	"Damage from the Inside"	Tawnia McKiernan	Jacob Pinion	November 22, 2020	1.09
77	8	"The Door"	Michael E. Satrazemis	Ian Goldberg & Andrew Chambliss	April 11, 2021	1.17
78	9	"Things Left to Do"	Michael E. Satrazemis	Nick Bernardone	April 18, 2021	1.12
79	10	"Handle with Care"	Heather Cappiello	Ashley Cardiff & David Johnson	April 25, 2021	1.10
80	11	"The Holding"	K.C. Colwell	Channing Powell	May 2, 2021	1.03
81	12	"In Dreams"	Michael E. Satrazemis	Andrew Chambliss & Ian Goldberg & Nazrin Choudhury	May 9, 2021	0.99
82	13	"J.D."	Aisha Tyler	Nick Bernardone & Jacob Pinion	May 16, 2021	1.09
83	14	"Mother"	Janice Cooke	Channing Powell & Alex Delyle	May 23, 2021	0.94
84	15	"USS Pennsylvania"	Heather Cappiello	Nazrin Choudhury & Nick Bernardone	June 6, 2021	0.87
85	16	"The Beginning"	Michael E. Satrazemis	Ian Goldberg & Andrew Chambliss	June 13, 2021	1.05

=== Season 7 (2021–22) ===
No. overall	No. in season	Title	Directed by	Written by	Original release date	U.S. viewers (millions)
86	1	"The Beacon"	Michael E. Satrazemis	Ian Goldberg & Andrew Chambliss	October 17, 2021	1.09
87	2	"Six Hours"	Michael E. Satrazemis	Andrew Chambliss & Ian Goldberg	October 24, 2021	0.96
88	3	"Cindy Hawkins"	Ron Underwood	Nick Bernardone & Jacob Pinion	October 31, 2021	0.87
89	4	"Breathe with Me"	Tara Nicole Weyr	Nazrin Choudhury & David Johnson	November 7, 2021	0.73
90	5	"Till Death"	Lennie James	Justin Boyd & Ashley Cardiff	November 14, 2021	0.93
91	6	"Reclamation"	Bille Woodruff	Alex Delyle & Calaya Michelle Stallworth	November 21, 2021	0.88
92	7	"The Portrait"	Heather Cappiello	Nick Bernardone	November 28, 2021	0.94
93	8	"PADRE"	Michael E. Satrazemis	Ian Goldberg & Andrew Chambliss	December 5, 2021	0.84
94	9	"Follow Me"	Heather Cappiello	Andrew Chambliss & Ian Goldberg	April 17, 2022	0.84
95	10	"Mourning Cloak"	Lennie James	Nazrin Choudhury & Calaya Michelle Stallworth	April 24, 2022	0.79
96	11	"Ofelia"	Alycia Debnam-Carey	Alex Delyle & David Johnson	May 1, 2022	0.74
97	12	"Sonny Boy"	Ron Underwood	Justin Boyd & Jacob Pinion	May 8, 2022	0.72
98	13	"The Raft"	Gary Rake	Nazrin Choudhury & Nick Bernardone	May 15, 2022	0.74
99	14	"Divine Providence"	Edward Ornelas	Alex Delyle & David Johnson	May 22, 2022	0.66
100	15	"Amina"	Michael E. Satrazemis	Ian Goldberg & Andrew Chambliss	May 29, 2022	0.60
101	16	"Gone"	Sharat Raju	Andrew Chambliss & Ian Goldberg	June 5, 2022	0.71

=== Season 8 (2023) ===
No. overall	No. in season	Title	Directed by	Written by	Original release date	U.S. viewers (millions)
102	1	"Remember What They Took from You"	Michael E. Satrazemis	Ian Goldberg & Andrew Chambliss	May 14, 2023	0.56
103	2	"Blue Jay"	Heather Cappielo	Andrew Chambliss & Ian Goldberg	May 21, 2023	0.47
104	3	"Odessa"	Ron Underwood	Andrew Chambliss & Ian Goldberg	May 28, 2023	0.47
105	4	"King County"	Kenneth Requa	Ian Goldberg & Andrew Chambliss	June 4, 2023	0.46
106	5	"More Time Than You Know"	Heather Cappielo	David Johnson & Calaya Michelle Stallworth	June 11, 2023	0.55
107	6	"All I See Is Red"	Michael E. Satrazemis	Andrew Chambliss & Ian Goldberg	June 18, 2023	0.46
108	7	"Anton"	Danay García	Nazrin Choudhury & Justin Boyd	October 22, 2023	0.54
109	8	"Iron Tiger"	S. J. Main Muñoz	Nick Bernardone & Jacob Pinion	October 29, 2023	0.52
110	9	"Sanctuary"	Phil McLaughlin	Justin Boyd & David Johnson	November 5, 2023	0.50
111	10	"Keeping Her Alive"	James Armstrong	Nazrin Choudhury & Calaya Michelle Stallworth	November 12, 2023	0.47
112	11	"Fighting Like You"	Haifaa al-Mansour	Nick Bernardone & Jacob Pinion & Kelly Jane Costello	November 19, 2023	0.44
113	12	"The Road Ahead"	Michael E. Satrazemis	Ian Goldberg & Andrew Chambliss	November 19, 2023	0.44

== Webisodes ==
=== Fear the Walking Dead: Flight 462 ===
A 16-part web series, Fear the Walking Dead: Flight 462, was released from October 4, 2015, to March 26, 2016, on AMC.com; it also aired as promos during The Walking Dead season 6. The web series depicts the outbreak's effect on a commercial airplane flight. Two of its characters, Alex (originally called Charlie in the web series), and Jake are introduced in Fear the Walking Dead season 2, episode 3 "Ouroboros".

=== Fear the Walking Dead: Passage ===
A second 16-part web series, was released from October 17, 2016, and March 27, 2017, and episodes were made available online weekly and aired as promos during the seventh season of The Walking Dead. The web series follows Sierra, a capable survivor, who helps an injured woman named Gabi, as they try to find sanctuary. The series was written by Lauren Signorino and Mike Zunic and directed by Andrew Bernstein.

=== The Althea Tapes ===
A six-part web series was released from July 27 to August 8, 2019, on AMC.com and YouTube. The web series features Althea interviewing different survivors for their story.

=== Dead in the Water ===
In March 2021, AMC announced the digital spin-off series Dead in the Water: A Fear the Walking Dead Story, which is set aboard USS Pennsylvania and "tells the story of a submarine crew fighting for survival, cut off from the surface world just as the apocalypse hits, becoming a nuclear-fueled walker-filled death trap with no way out." The special stars Nick Stahl as Jason Riley and premiered on AMC+ on April 10, 2022.

== Ratings ==
Fear the Walking Dead : U.S. viewers per episode (millions)

Season	Episode number																Average
Season	1	2	3	4	5	6	7	8	9	10	11	12	13	14	15	16	Average
1	10.13	8.18	7.19	6.62	6.66	6.86	–										7.61
2	6.67	5.58	4.73	4.80	4.41	4.49	4.39	3.86	3.66	2.99	3.40	3.62	3.49	3.67	3.05	–	4.19
3	3.11	2.70	2.50	2.40	2.50	2.19	2.62	2.40	2.14	2.14	1.99	2.08	2.36	2.23	2.23	2.23	2.36
4	4.09	3.07	2.71	2.49	2.46	2.31	1.97	2.32	1.88	1.86	1.83	1.52	1.71	1.87	2.03	2.13	2.27
5	1.97	1.69	1.76	1.66	1.71	1.49	1.39	1.60	1.40	1.37	1.44	1.14	1.45	1.31	1.34	1.51	1.51
6	1.59	1.55	1.50	1.28	1.24	1.27	1.09	1.17	1.12	1.10	1.03	0.99	1.09	0.94	0.87	1.05	1.18
7	1.09	0.96	0.87	0.73	0.93	0.88	0.94	0.84	0.84	0.79	0.74	0.72	0.74	0.66	0.60	0.71	0.82
8	0.56	0.47	0.47	0.46	0.55	0.46	0.54	0.52	0.50	0.47	0.44	0.44	–				0.49

Audience measurement performed by Nielsen Media Research

== Home media ==
Season	Episodes	DVD/Blu-ray release dates
Season	Episodes	Region 1/A
1	6	December 1, 2015; March 22, 2016 (special edition)
2	15	December 13, 2016
3	16	March 13, 2018
4	16	March 5, 2019
5	16	May 19, 2020
6	16	August 31, 2021
7	16	January 10, 2023
8	12	February 27, 2024
