= North (Fear the Walking Dead) =

- Fear the Walking Dead episode
- Episode no.: Season 2 Episode 15
- Directed by: Andrew Bernstein
- Written by: Dave Erickson
- Original air date: October 2, 2016
- Running time: 42 minutes

Guest appearances
- Karen Bethzabe as Elena Reyes; Kelly Blatz as Brandon Luke; Paul Calderon as Alejandro Nuñez; Ruben Carbajal as Antonio Reyes; Raul Casso as Andrés Diaz; Alejandro Edda as Marco Rodriguez; Danay García as Luciana Galvez; Ramses Jimenez as Hector Reyes; Andres Londono as Oscar Diaz; Kenny Wormald as Derek

Episode chronology
← Previous "Wrath"	Next → "Eye of the Beholder"
- Fear the Walking Dead (season 2)

"North" is the fifteenth and final episode of the second season, and the 21st episode overall of the post-apocalyptic horror television series Fear the Walking Dead, which aired on AMC on October 3, 2016, along with the previous episode, "Wrath".

== Plot ==
Following Travis beating and killing Derek and Brandon and severely injuring Oscar, other members of the hotel survivors apprehend him and keep him in custody. Oscar suffers a severe head injury due to Travis and is taken to be treated by the hotel's medic Andrés, who is also Oscar's brother. Since Travis had violated the community's rule prohibiting any violence against other survivors, Strand warns Madison that Travis will likely be exiled by the rest of the hotel, and he advises against defending Travis out of fear of being exiled themselves. Alicia proposes that, instead of having Travis exiled, the four of them leave the hotel voluntarily and find a different place to live; Madison is hesitant but eventually agrees, but Strand refuses and insists that he will stay. Madison proposes the deal to Elena, who agrees to allow them to stay for the night and leave at dawn, despite Hector's protests. That night, however, Oscar succumbs to his head injury and dies; enraged, Hector, Andrés, and several of the hotel survivors break into Travis' room and attack him. When Andrés attempts to shoot him, Alicia fatally stabs him; Strand picks up his gun and the remaining hotel survivors flee. Strand, Travis, Madison, and Alicia all retreat to the parking lot and hot wire a car to escape, but Strand hands Madison the gun and insists they leave without him. The three of them reluctantly drive off.

Meanwhile, in La Colonia, Luciana prompts Alejandro to continue pretending to be immune from the infection in order to maintain the community's faith. At her prompting, he delivers a speech to the community members asserting that they should defend their homes against the impending Los Hernandos attack. Not wanting to get caught in the upcoming attack, Nick quietly leaves the community, but he is surprised to see a helicopter in the distance land at a camp on the American side of the border. Believing that the camp may serve as a way to avoid fighting, he returns to La Colonia and informs Alejandro. He convinces Alejandro that, instead of his community watching him succumb to the infection, he can maintain his legacy by serving as a distraction to allow the rest of the community to escape and head north. The following morning, Marco and the Los Hermanos arrive outside La Colonia and pass through the undead-barrier, but find the community to be abandoned. Unbeknownst to them, Alejandro was hiding near the entrance; he breaks open the community's improvised gate, allowing the infected to enter and overwhelming Marco and his men, killing them.

After leaving the hotel, Madison suggests that she, Alicia, and Travis should go to the store where she overheard some gang members talking about someone she believed to be Nick. Upon arriving, they discover it to be entirely empty, but they find the bodies of Francisco and his family. They search the bodies and discover the location of La Colonia. They drive to La Colonia and discover it to be devoid of any people and filled only with the undead, however Alicia discovers Alejandro, conscious but barely alive. Madison asks if he knows Nick, and he tells them that Nick went to the border, before succumbing to the infection and dying.

Having evacuated La Colonia, Nick and Luciana lead their group towards the camp that he spotted earlier. Upon arriving at the border, they catch sight of the helicopter again, before they are suddenly ambushed by another armed group. Several survivors are killed and most of the rest flee, but Nick and Luciana are captured and knocked unconscious.

== Reception ==
"North", together with the previous episode "Wrath", received mostly positive reviews from critics. On Rotten Tomatoes, it received a 79% rating, with an average score of 7.25/10 based on 14 reviews. The site consensus reads, ""Wrath" and "North" effectively conclude a season that has gained resonance as it has progressed, culminating with dangerous but due violence, affecting reflections on human nature and an intriguing ending teaser".

Matt Fowler of IGN gave "Wrath" and "North" an 8.5/10.0 rating, the highest of the season, stating; "Fear the Walking Dead finishes its shaky second season on a satisfying note with some nice, sinister surprises and big, brutal moments. Travis' extended beatdown and murder of Derek and Brandon was excellently done, as were the consequences of those actions (which accidentally took an innocent life). Over on Nick's side of the story, we all knew Alejandro would be exposed as a fraud at some point, but everything was handled well and Nick got to save the day (well... until the very end) without having to rush in and physically protect people like an action hero".

=== Ratings ===
"North" was seen by 3.05 million viewers in the United States on its original air date, below the previous episode's rating of 3.67 million that aired on the same night.
