= Pablo & Jessica =

- Fear the Walking Dead episode
- Episode no.: Season 2 Episode 11
- Directed by: Uta Briesewitz
- Written by: Kate Erickson
- Original air date: September 11, 2016
- Running time: 43 minutes

Guest appearances
- Karen Bethzabe as Elena Reyes; Paul Calderon as Alejandro Nuñez; Raul Casso as Andrés Diaz; Danay Garcia as Luciana Galvez; Ramses Jimenez as Hector Reyes; Andres Londono as Oscar Diaz; Brenda Strong as Ilene Stowe

Episode chronology
← Previous "Do Not Disturb"	Next → "Pillar of Salt"
- Fear the Walking Dead (season 2)

"Pablo & Jessica" is the eleventh episode of the second season, and the 17th episode overall of the post-apocalyptic horror television series Fear the Walking Dead, which aired on AMC on September 11, 2016.

== Plot ==
In order to preserve La Colonia's dwindling oxycodone supplies, Nick proposes to Alejandro that they trick the Los Hermanos gang by crushing the tablets to remove the time release coating and diluting it with powdered milk, producing a greater quantity of medication that is both stronger and faster-acting but lasts a shorter period of time. This both buys the community more time before they run out and makes the pills more addictive. Alejandro is impressed with Nick's ingenuity and accepts him fully into the community by providing him with his own house. When Nick notices a wound on Alejandro's shoulder, he explains to Nick that he has been bitten by an infected but did not turn, which he believes to be a sign from God that he and his community are destined to inherit the Earth. Nick remains skeptical, but does not voice his doubts. Later that afternoon, one of the community's scouts returns and reports that Luciana's brother Pablo has been killed; Luciana is shocked at the news, and is comforted by Nick, strengthening the bond between them. That night, Luciana visits Nick, and they both begin to kiss.

Back at the hotel, Madison and Strand are shown to have escaped the hotel bar when the horde of undead swarmed the hotel, with the two of them remaining together until reuniting with Alicia and Elena. The four of them decide to meet with Oscar, the leader of the group of vengeful hotel survivors, and manage to negotiate a truce. Oscar's group and Madison's group work together to begin the job of clearing the hotel of undead. They begin by going room to room, floor by floor, but Alicia comes up with a more efficient idea of luring all of the infected off the hotel's pier and into the ocean, where the riptide current will carry them away. Despite the risk, they decide to try her plan, which they execute successfully, ridding the hotel of undead. That night, while the survivors celebrate, Strand goes to talk privately with Oscar, who is still mourning the death of his wife, who was killed in the ballroom when Elena locked the wedding guests inside. Oscar reveals that Jessica's reanimated corpse is inside one of the hotel rooms, as he wasn't able to bring himself to euthanize her. Strand comforts Oscar and convinces him to finally let his wife go; a tearful Oscar gives Strand the key to the hotel room, and Strand enters to finish her off.

== Reception ==
"Pablo & Jessica" received mostly positive reviews from critics. On Rotten Tomatoes, it garnered a 79% rating, with an average score of 7.25/10 based on 14 reviews. The site consensus currently reads, ""Pablo & Jessica" overcomes its dragging spots and a too-easily-resolved plot with gnjoyable[sic] setups and powerful dialogue."

Matt Fowler of IGN gave "Pablo & Jessica" a 7.5/10.0 rating stating; "There was a ton of zombie action this week at the hotel as Madison and Alicia's new jumbled crew worked to clear the resort of undead. But, overall, the hotel saga, with all the new faces and conflict, doesn't feel as pressing as it should. Part of that has to do with the way these episodes have been structured and the rest of it involves the show's new influx of other people do bear the brunt of death and dismay. Nick's storyline, however, while not as violent right now, feels more investable."

=== Ratings ===
"Pablo & Jessica" was seen by 3.40 million viewers in the United States on its original air date, above the previous episodes rating of 2.99 million.
