= Los muertos =

Los muertos may refer to:

- Los muertos (film), a 2004 Argentine drama film
- Los Muertos (Fear the Walking Dead), an episode of the television series Fear the Walking Dead
