= Wrath (Fear the Walking Dead) =

- Fear the Walking Dead episode
- Episode no.: Season 2 Episode 14
- Directed by: Stefan Schwartz
- Written by: Kate Barnow
- Original air date: October 2, 2016
- Running time: 42 minutes

Guest appearances
- Karen Bethzabe as Elena Reyes; Kelly Blatz as Brandon Luke; Paul Calderon as Alejandro Nuñez; Dayton Callie as Jeremiah Otto; Ruben Carbajal as Antonio Reyes; Raul Casso as Andrés Diaz; Alejandro Edda as Marco Rodriguez; Danay García as Luciana Galvez; Ramses Jimenez as Hector Reyes; Andres Londono as Oscar Diaz; Kenny Wormald as Derek

Episode chronology
← Previous "Date of Death"	Next → "North"
- Fear the Walking Dead (season 2)

"Wrath" is the fourteenth and penultimate episode of the second season, and the 20th episode overall of the post-apocalyptic horror television series Fear the Walking Dead, which aired on AMC on October 3, 2016 along with the season finale; North.

This episode marks the final appearance of Lorenzo James Henrie (Chris Manawa), whose fate was revealed in this episode. This episode also marks the first appearance of Dayton Callie (Jeremiah Otto), whose character would play a prominent role in the third season.

== Plot ==
Ofelia continues her journey to the US border, where she encounters a man who initially shoots at her, but, upon realizing she is unarmed, approaches and welcomes her to the United States.

In La Colonia, Nick and another scout, Reynaldo, disobey Alejandro's request and attempt to make the planned trade with the Los Hermanos gang. Upon arriving at the store, however, they are told by the gang's leader, Marco, that their trade deal is no longer necessary, as they have grown tired of the delays from La Colonia and have found a new supplier of oxycodone. He also reveals that his men have figured out the location and entry points for La Colonia; he tells Nick and Reynaldo that he plans to take over their community, and orders them to warn all the community members that they must leave the community by the end of the day, or be killed by Los Hermanos. To demonstrate his resolve, Marco shows Nick the corpses of Francisco and his family.

Reynaldo and Nick return to La Colonia and warn Alejandro and Luciana about the impending attack. Nick begs Luciana to leave with him, but Luciana is still adamant in Alejandro's ability to protect them. Frustrated, Nick forces Alejandro to admit to her that he is not actually immune to the infection, and that his story about being bit by an undead and surviving was a lie. At Nick's prompting, he also reveals that he was actually bitten by an undead in the infirmary earlier that day, meaning he only has a short amount of time to live. Despite feeling betrayed at the realization that her faith in Alejandro was based on a lie, Luciana still refuses to leave with Nick, asserting that La Colonia is her home and she will fight to protect it.

Back at the hotel, Brandon and Derek are let inside after arriving at the gates. While assessing their medical state, Madison recognizes them based on Travis' description of the people who left with Chris. She overhears them discussing a third group member who died shortly before they arrived at the hotel; she deduces they must be referring to Chris. She tells this to Strand, and the two of them agree not to tell Travis, since the discovery of Chris' death would crush any hope he has left. Throughout the day, Brandon and Derek's obnoxious behavior begins to anger the rest of the survivors, and Madison prepares to evict the two from the hotel, but Travis suddenly notices them and asks them what happened to Chris. They tell him that Chris accidentally crashed their truck and was killed by the impact, but inconsistencies in their stories lead Travis to conclude that Chris was merely injured in the crash, and that the two of them killed him themselves. After viciously beating them, they admit that Travis is correct and they did kill Chris, though this only enrages Travis further, causing him to beat them both to death and severely injuring Oscar when he tries to intervene, while Madison watches on in horror.

== Reception ==
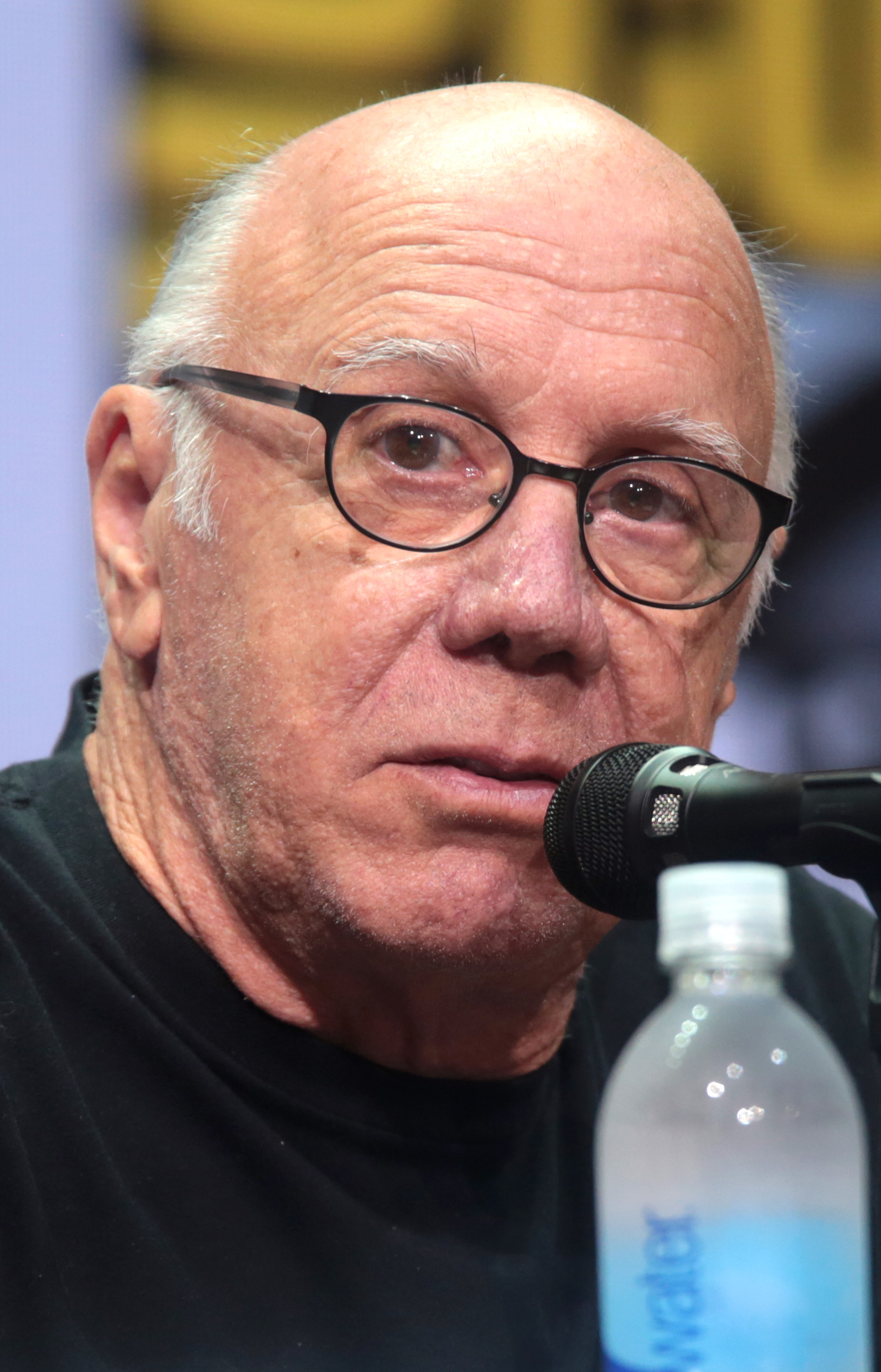
Dayton Callie made his first appearance as Jeremiah Otto in this episode.

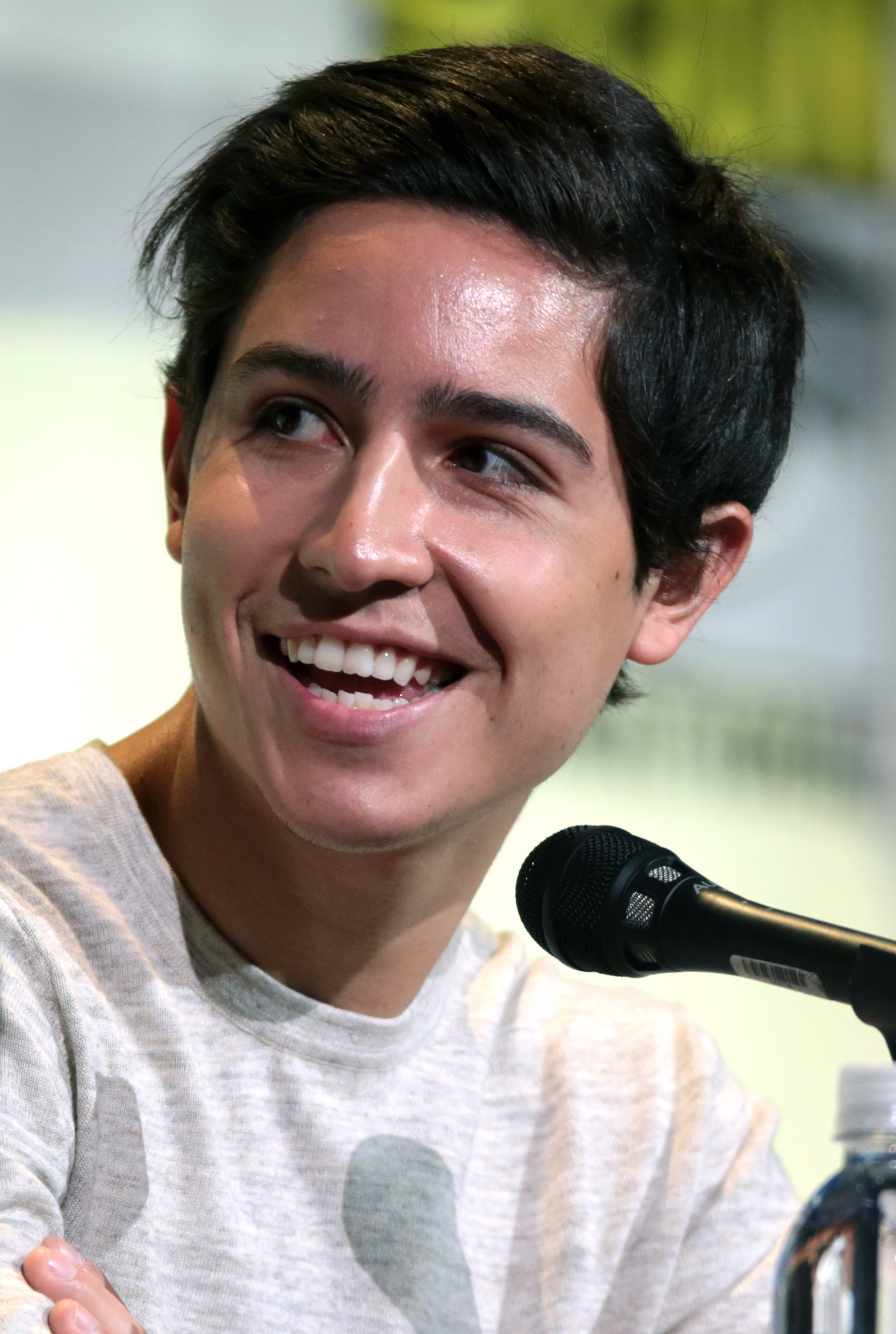
Chris Manawa's (Lorenzo James Henrie) death was lauded by critics.

"Wrath", together with the season finale "North", received mostly positive reviews from critics. On Rotten Tomatoes, it garnered a 79% rating, with an average score of 7.25/10 based on 14 reviews. The site consensus currently reads, ""Wrath" and "North" effectively conclude a season that has gained resonance as it has progressed, culminating with dangerous but due violence, affecting reflections on human nature, and an intriguing ending teaser."

In a joint-episode review along with the season finale, Matt Fowler of IGN gave "Wrath" and "North" an 8.5/10.0 rating together, the highest rating of the season, stating; "Fear the Walking Dead finishes its shaky second season on a satisfying note with some nice, sinister surprises and big, brutal moments. Travis' extended beatdown and murder of Derek and Brandon was excellently done, as were the consequences of those actions (which accidentally took an innocent life). Over on Nick's side of the story, we all knew Alejandro would be exposed as a fraud at some point, but everything was handled well and Nick got to save the day (well... until the very end) without having to rush in and physically protect people like an action hero."

=== Ratings ===
"Wrath" was seen by 3.67 million viewers in the United States on its original air date, above the previous episode's rating of 3.49 million.
