= Date of Death =

- Fear the Walking Dead episode
- Episode no.: Season 2 Episode 13
- Directed by: Christoph Schrewe
- Written by: Brian Buckner
- Original air date: September 25, 2016
- Running time: 41 minutes

Guest appearances
- Karen Bethzabe as Elena Reyes; Kelly Blatz as Brandon Luke; Israel Broussard as James McCallister; Raul Casso as Andrés Diaz; Ramses Jimenez as Hector Reyes; Andres Londono as Oscar Diaz; Kenny Wormald as Derek

Episode chronology
← Previous "Pillar of Salt"	Next → "Wrath"
- Fear the Walking Dead (season 2)

"Date of Death" is the thirteenth episode of the second season, and the 19th episode overall of the post-apocalyptic horror television series Fear the Walking Dead, which aired on AMC on September 25, 2016.

== Plot ==
A large number of survivors who had seen the hotel's lights come on flock to the hotel gates, demanding to be let in, but the hotel survivors refuse to grant them entry. Suddenly, Madison spots Travis among the crowd and lets him inside, asking him what has happened in the time since their separation.

It is shown that, after Chris shot and killed the farmer, Travis tried to treat the wounds of James, the tourist who was shot in the leg by the farmer; he also buries the farmer's body next to his family's graves. That night, Travis tries to warn Chris that the tourists should not be trusted, but Chris rebuffs him. After staying on the farm for a week, the tourists decide to leave for San Diego in spite of Travis' warnings that the city has been burned to the ground. However, because James still hasn't fully recovered, his injuries prevent him from being moved, delaying the plans of leaving. When he overhears the others consider killing James, Travis steals Chris' gun to protect him. James tells Travis that he and his friends made a pact to ensure none of them would turn, explaining that he even killed a fourth member of their group who was bitten by one of the undead. He grows concerned that his friends will kill him under the misguided belief that it will be a mercy killing as well, since they believe he is dying and want to leave for San Diego soon; Travis promises not to let the others kill him.

That night, Chris arrives to deliver food and pretends to make amends with Travis, but it is quickly revealed to be a distraction, allowing the other two tourists, Brandon and Derek, to ambush Travis and murder James. The following morning, Chris and the tourists plan to leave for San Diego but refuse to take Travis with them; despite his pleas for Chris to stay, Chris leaves with the remaining two tourists. Travis is left all alone at the barn, until he eventually decides to head south, walking for two days until he spotted the hotel's lights.

In the present, Travis laments to Madison how he failed to take care of Chris and regrets that he never told him he loved him before parting ways. Shaken by Travis's story, Madison begins to grow more appreciative of Alicia's commitment to stay with her; she decides to tell this to Alicia. While the two embrace, Madison also tearfully reveals to Alicia that her father's fatal car crash was not accidental, but was actually suicide; she had simply told Alicia and Nick that it was an accident in order to spare them. Despite being heartbroken at this news, Alicia thanks Madison for telling her. That night, the hotel survivors decide to let in the other survivors of the gates, offering them supplies and medical treatment. More survivors from around arrive at the hotel, and among them are Brandon and Derek.

== Reception ==
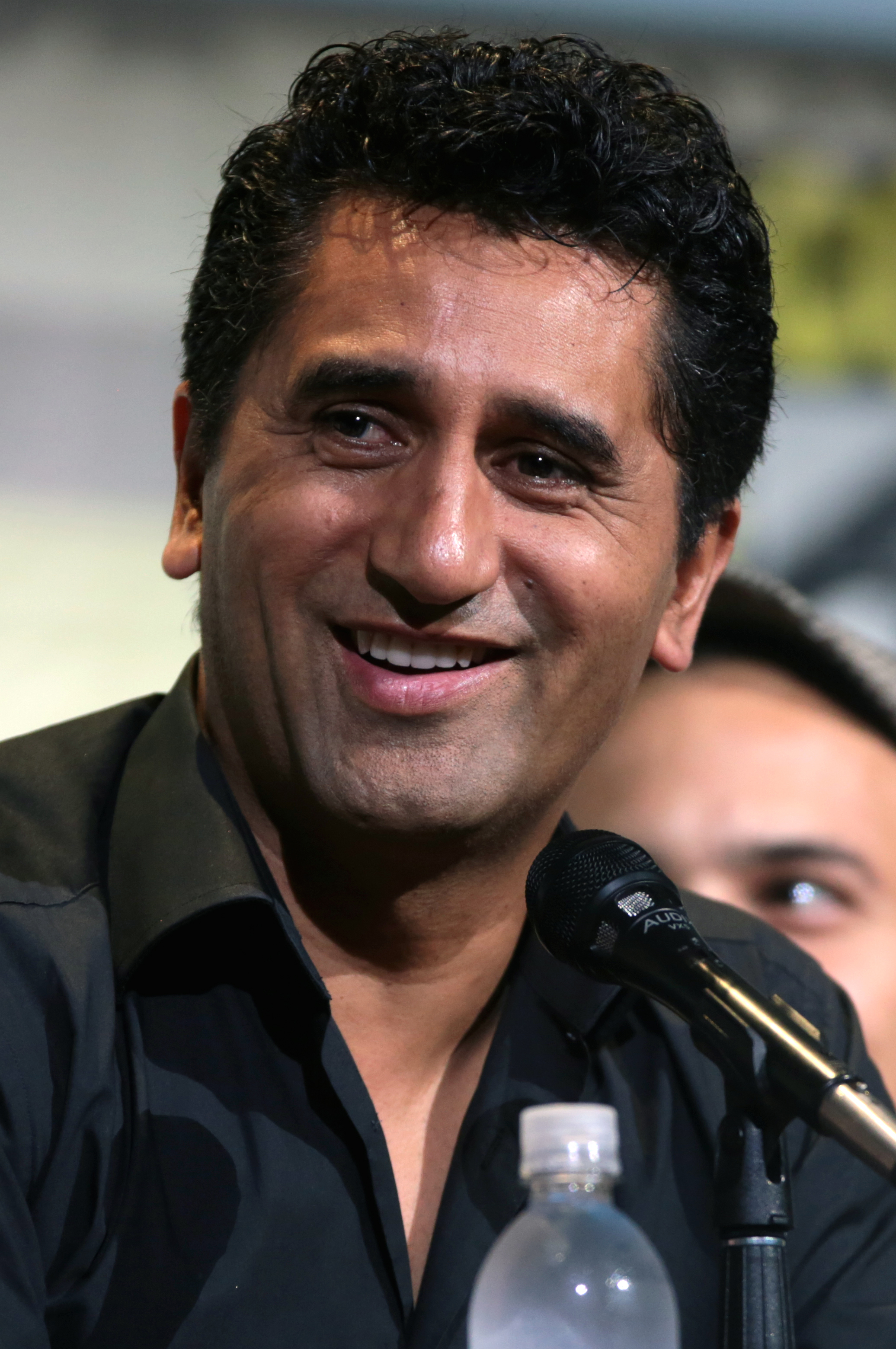
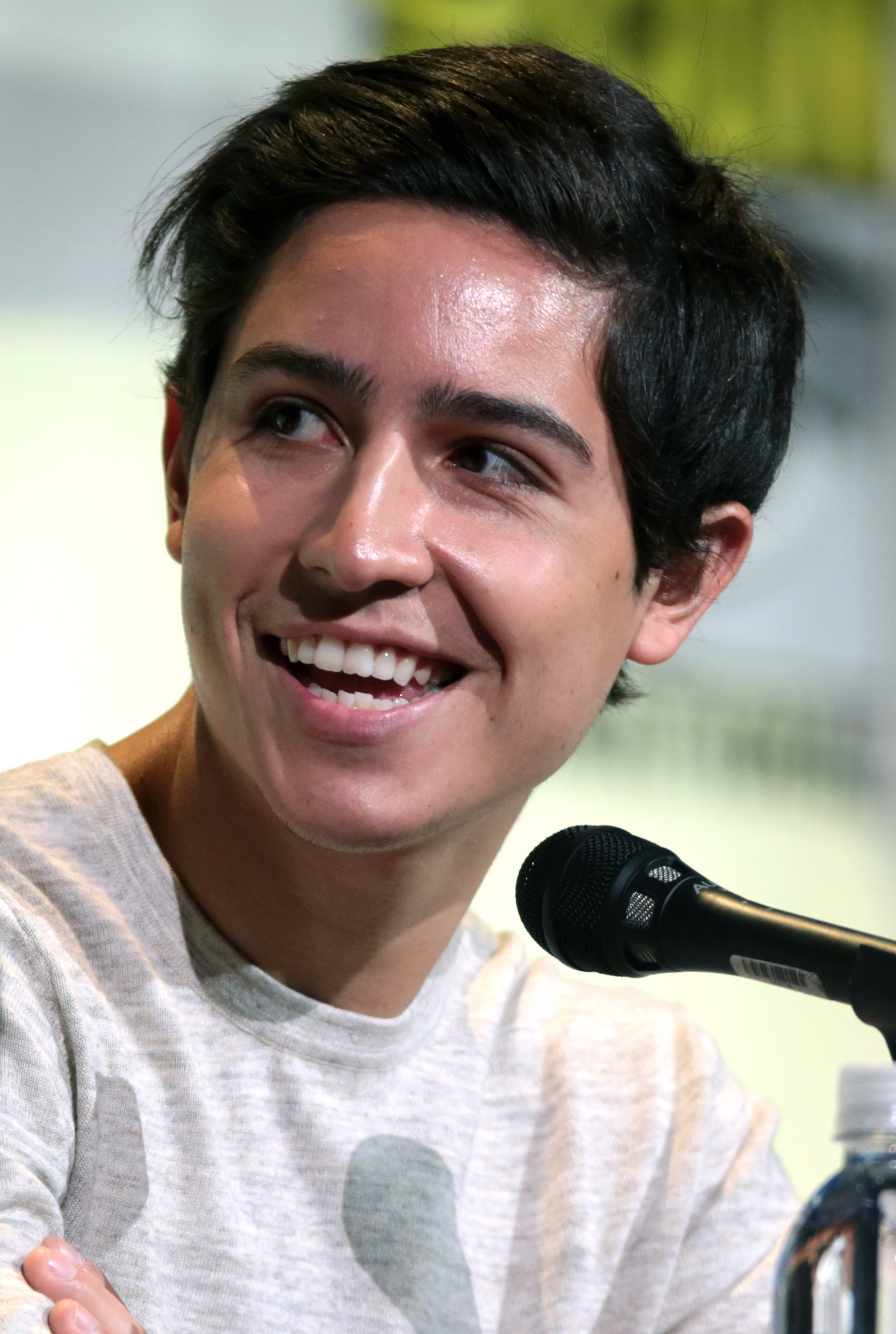
Although the episode's overall reception has received mixed reviews, Travis Manawa's (Cliff Curtis) and Chris Manawa's (Lorenzo James Henrie) relationship during this episode was met with high praise from critics.

"Date of Death" received mixed reviews from critics, although Travis' and Chris' story arc was met with high praise. On Rotten Tomatoes, it garnered a 67% rating, with an average score of 5.95/10 based on 12 reviews. The site consensus currently reads, ""Date of Death" doesn't advance the season's arc much, but the story—and the relationship between two key characters—remains strong."

Matt Fowler of IGN gave "Date of Death" an 8/10.0 rating, stating; "Fear the Walking Dead turned its focus back to Travis and Chris and gave us a great story about a father trying his best to save his son from turning into a dudebro zompocalypse goon. It didn't work, and Chris went his own way, but the storyline helped elevate Travis even further, showing us the actual value in his ideals."

=== Ratings ===
"Date of Death" was seen by 3.49 million viewers in the United States on its original air date, below the previous episodes rating of 3.62 million.
