= Pillar of Salt (Fear the Walking Dead) =

- Fear the Walking Dead episode
- Episode no.: Season 2 Episode 12
- Directed by: Gerardo Naranjo
- Written by: Carla Ching
- Original air date: September 18, 2016
- Running time: 43 minutes

Guest appearances
- Karen Bethzabe as Elena Reyes; Paul Calderon as Alejandro Nuñez; Ruben Carbajal as Antonio Reyes; Raul Casso as Andrés Diaz; Alejandro Edda as Marco Rodriguez; Danay García as Luciana Galvez; Ramses Jimenez as Hector Reyes; Andres Londono as Oscar Diaz; Patricia Reyes Spíndola as Griselda Salazar; Brenda Strong as Ilene Stowe; Ashley Zukerman as William

Episode chronology
← Previous "Pablo & Jessica"	Next → "Date of Death"
- Fear the Walking Dead (season 2)

"Pillar of Salt" is the twelfth episode of the second season, and the 18th episode overall of the post-apocalyptic horror television series Fear the Walking Dead, which aired on AMC on September 18, 2016.

This episode marks the final appearance of Griselda Salazar (Patricia Reyes Spíndola), seen in a flashback sequence, who died at the end of the first season. Ofelia Salazar (Mercedes Mason) returns after briefly disappearing at the end of the ninth episode "Los Muertos".

== Plot ==
Ofelia, having left the hotel to live on her own, takes the group's truck and departs the hotel. She briefly stops at a restaurant where she had previously spent time with her fiancé William before the apocalypse, and reminisces, before getting back into the truck and driving towards the United States.

At the hotel, now rid of all undead, the survivors begin fortifying and repairing the building. Ilene, the mother of Oscar's late wife, seeks vengeance against Strand for putting down her undead daughter; she stabs Strand in an attempt to kill him. The wound is not fatal, though it requires medicine that the survivors do not have. Madison and Elena offer to drive to Tijuana to obtain the medicine from a grocery store; the same one that La Colonia trades with. At the store, Madison and Elena arrive to trade, where she overhears one of the Los Hermanos members interrogating Francisco, one of La Colonia's scouts who deserted the community with his family. Madison overhears them describe Nick's appearance and believes he may be nearby; she asks about his whereabouts, but does not receive an answer. Angered at her interruptions, the Los Hermanos order her and Elena to leave with their medicine. Upon returning to the hotel, Madison is now convinced that Nick is somewhere in the area, and desperately turns on the hotel lights - against everybody's wishes - in hopes of attracting his attention. Alicia convinces her to shut off the lights, and reveals that she is frustrated at both Nick's decision to abandon their family, and Madison's lack of appreciation at her own decision to stick with the group. Madison shuts off the lights and makes amends with Alicia, reassuring her that she does appreciate her decision. From a distance, Travis sees the hotel lights when they briefly turn on, and begins to head towards them.

Meanwhile, in La Colonia, Nick and Luciana are awoken by the news of Francisco's desertion. With the community losing scouts at an increasing rate, Alejandro is worried the community might collapse, and forbids anybody from leaving, even for supply runs. Nick grows concerned, since they were supposed to make a trade with Los Hermanos later that day, and he worries that they will try to attack the community if they don't get what they want, though Alejandro remains unconcerned. While patrolling the perimeter, Nick's worries are confirmed when he spots some Los Hermanos members spying on the community from a distance.

== Reception ==
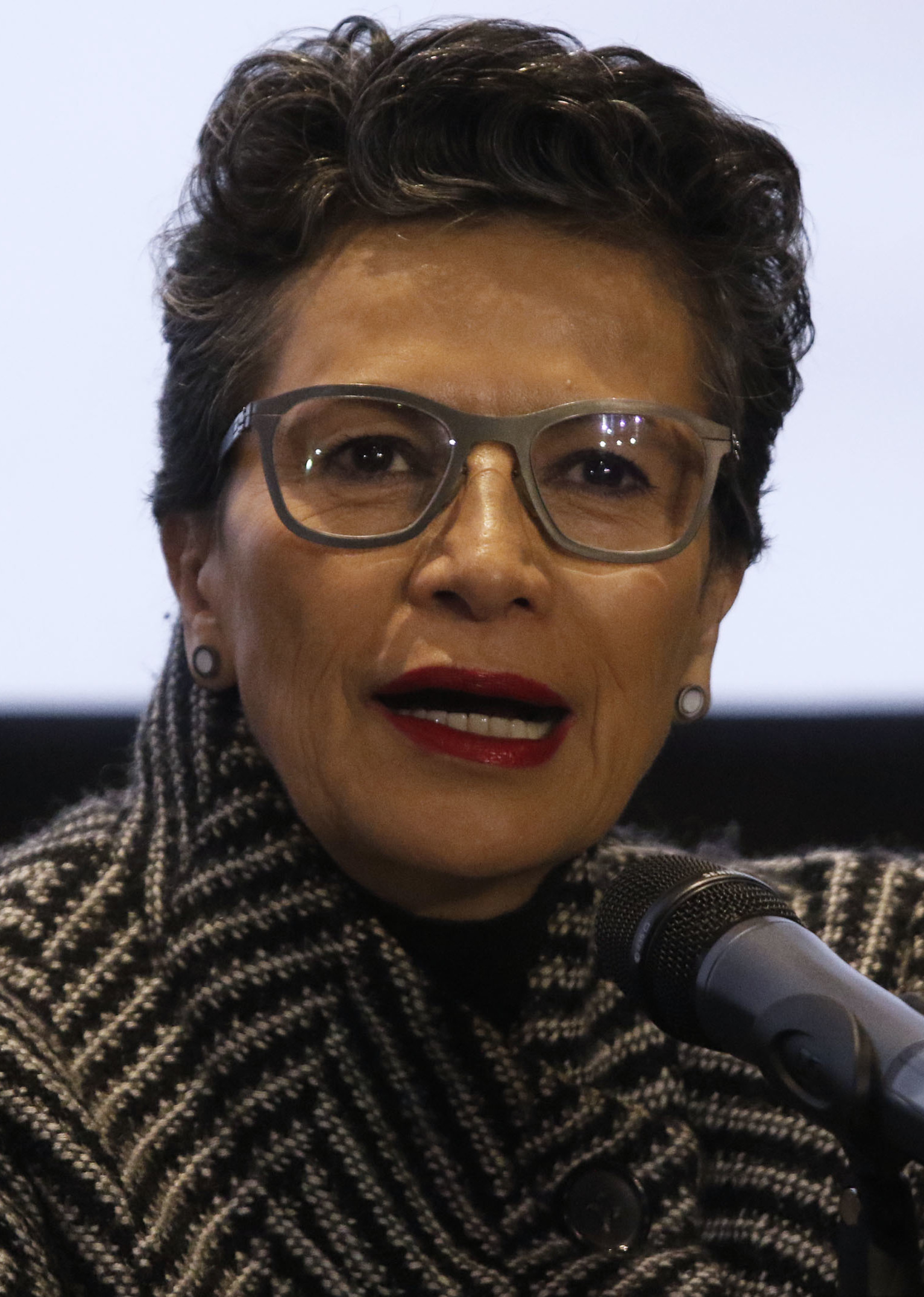
Patricia Reyes Spindola makes her last appearance as Griselda Salazar.

"Pillar of Salt" received positive reviews from critics. On Rotten Tomatoes, it garnered a 71% rating, with an average score of 5.72/10 based on 14 reviews. The site consensus currently reads, ""Pillar of Salt" is a solidly assembled collection of character arcs and moving parts, but Fear the Walking Dead remains in need of some fresh plots to sustain long-term interest."

Matt Fowler of IGN gave "Pillar of Salt" a 6.9/10.0 rating stating; "Ofelia's flashbacks (featuring the return of actress Patricia Reyes Spíndola) were the most appealing aspects of "Pillar of Salt," which felt too much like it was forcing a collision between separate story threads."

=== Ratings ===
"Pillar of Salt" was seen by 3.62 million viewers in the United States on its original air date, slightly above the previous episodes rating of 3.40 million.
