= Death and Cremation =

- Directed by: Justin Steele
- Written by: Justin Steele; Alecc Bracero
- Starring: Brad Dourif; Jeremy Sumpter; Scott Elrod
- Release date: October 1, 2010 (Screamfest)
- Running time: 86 minutes
- Country: United States
- Language: English

Death and Cremation is an independent feature film starring Brad Dourif and Jeremy Sumpter, and is the first feature from Director Justin Steele. The film's supporting cast includes Scott Elrod, Daniel Baldwin, Debbon Ayer, Sam Ingraffia, Staci Keanan, Kate Maher, Blake Hood and Madison Eginton.

== Story ==
Death and Cremation is a suburban-set thriller in which the character of Stan (Brad Dourif) operates a crematorium and occasionally seeks to mitigate typical suburban problems with his own macabre style. Stan frequently rejects potential clients, turning away the Weaver family (played by Baldwin, Keanan, and Maher) when they inquire about funeral rates. During that encounter there is a strange lack of concern from Stan about any possible lost income. Stan is soon joined at his establishment by Jarod (Jeremy Sumpter), a Goth outcast who talks his way into an after-school job only to discover that Stan's work involves more than just waiting for new business.

== Cast ==
- Brad Dourif as Stan
- Jeremy Sumpter as Jarod Leary
- Scott Elrod as Matt Fairchild
- Debbon Ayer as Martha Leary
- Sam Ingraffia as Rick Waters
- Daniel Baldwin as Bill Weaver
- Staci Keanan as Becky Weaver
- Kate Maher as Lindsey Weaver
- Carly Craig as Shelly Fairchild
- Blake Hood as David
- Madison Eginton as Courtney
- Kevin Elms as Ryan
- Karen Steele as Maria
- Tyson Turrou as Peter Waters
- Celine Lozier as Jenny Fairchild

== Production ==
Filming took place in Los Angeles, California during the summer of 2009. Locations included a trailer park in Montebello, Malibu, and various parts of East Los Angeles. A number of active funeral homes were used in order to lend credibility to the environment and satisfy a need for realistic props and set dressing.

To find the right physical appearance and temperament for his role as Stan, Dourif discussed the character at length with Steele and suggested that Stan have sores on his face, an extension from a psoriasis condition originally written into the script. Sumpter also immersed himself in his character and spoke with director Steele about making the rebellious Jarod more believable. Sumpter credits Dourif with encouraging him to do research for the character, digging deep in order to understand the outcast teenager's somewhat isolated existence in a trailer park.

== Reception ==
The film met with positive reviews from horror sites such as Bloody Disgusting and HorrorNews.net. JoBlo.com reviewed the movie, stating "The violence in the picture is, while not graphically overbearing, definitely more realistic than your typical horror fare - which in turn makes the entire story more believable."
