= Grotesque (Fear the Walking Dead) =

- Fear the Walking Dead episode
- Episode no.: Season 2 Episode 8
- Directed by: Daniel Sackheim
- Written by: Kate Barnow
- Original air date: August 21, 2016
- Running time: 45 minutes

Guest appearances
- Paul Calderon as Alejandro Nuñez; Danay García as Luciana Galvez; Lexi Johnson as Gloria

Episode chronology
← Previous "Shiva"	Next → "Los Muertos"
- Fear the Walking Dead (season 2)

"Grotesque" is the eighth episode and mid-season premiere, and the 14th episode overall of the second season of the post-apocalyptic horror television series Fear the Walking Dead, which aired on AMC on August 21, 2016.

This episode marks the first appearance of Danay Garcia (Luciana Galvez).

== Plot ==
After refusing to travel south with his family, Nick departs the destroyed compound on his own, heading towards Tijuana, which one of Celia's former community members said was home to a community of people who had beliefs similar to those of Celia. After walking all day, he seeks shelter in an abandoned building at sunset, but he is attacked by another survivor and forced to leave behind his supplies. He tries to scavenge abandoned cars for supplies, but is nearly killed by a gang of armed bandits who patrol the highways. He is chased into the wilderness, where he evades the bandits but finds himself lost and without any supplies. After falling asleep by an abandoned bus, he is attacked by a pair of feral dogs and bitten in the leg. He climbs atop the bus to escape the dogs, who are later devoured by a small group of the undead. The group of undead is later drawn away by the sounds of car horns and gunfire, giving Nick an opportunity to escape. He kills one of the undead and covers himself in its blood, allowing him to blend in with the rest of the horde as it travels along the highway in the direction of Tijuana. Soon, however, the group of bandits arrives again and begins to kill the undead, but they get distracted when they recognize Nick in the horde and are soon overwhelmed. Two of them are devoured, while the third flees.

Nick separates from the horde and continues down the highway alone, but soon passes out due to his injuries, dehydration, and malnourishment. A group of survivors observe Nick from a distance, but their leader, Luciana, opts not to help him. While unconscious, Nick has several dreams shown as flashbacks, beginning with his time in rehab with his girlfriend, Gloria. During an emotional exercise, he expresses his frustration at his father's lack of attention to him, bringing him to tears. He is later visited by Madison, who tells him that his father was killed in a car accident. He then has another flashback to the very beginning of the apocalypse, when he woke up in the heroin den to find Gloria's reanimated corpse eating another drug addict. A rainstorm wakes him from his unconsciousness, allowing him to clean his wounds and rehydrate; he manages to continue on his way to Tijuana. Upon arriving near the city, he encounters Luciana's group, who offer to bring him to their community to be treated.

== Reception ==
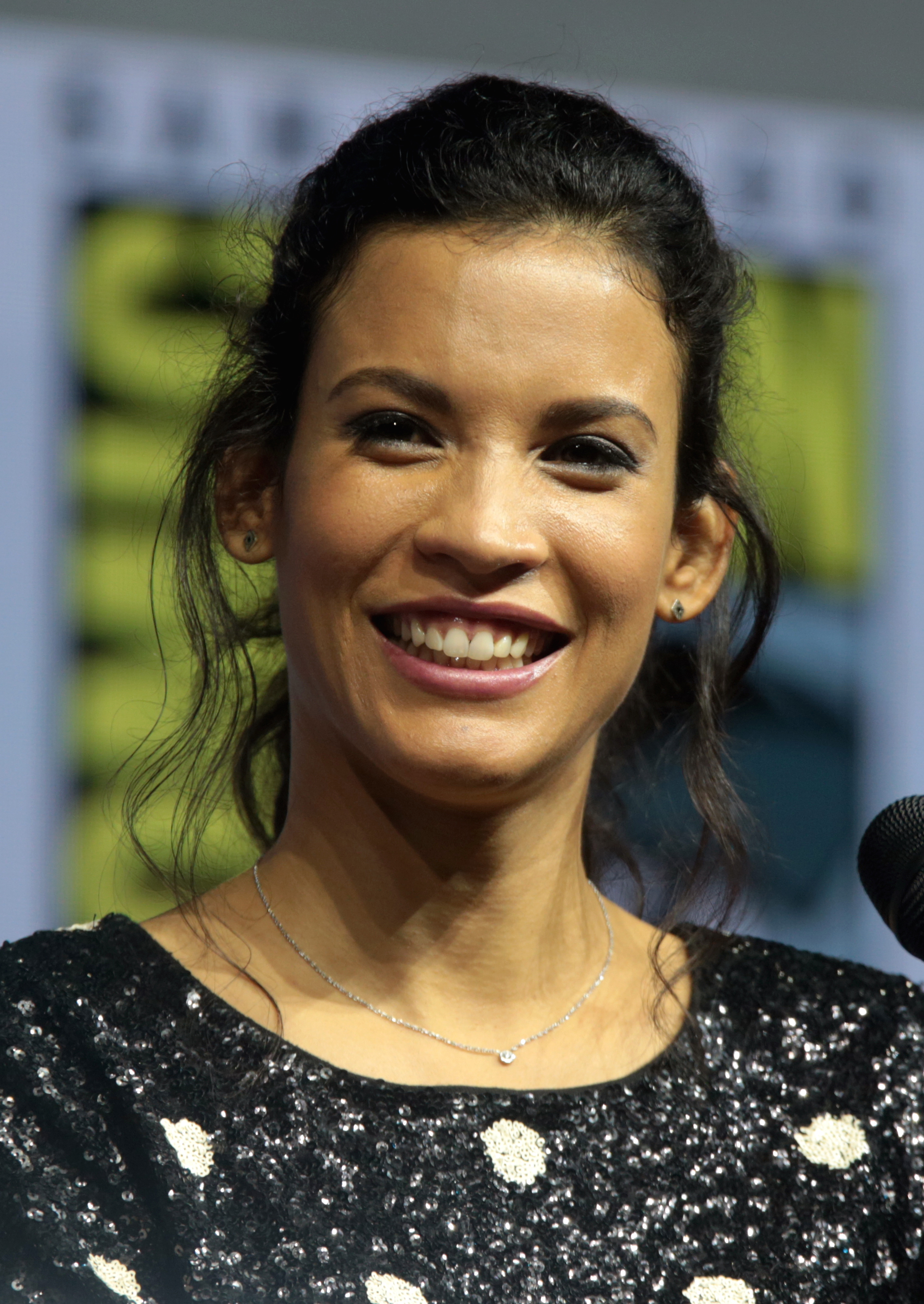
Danay Garcia made her first appearance as Luciana Galvez in this episode.

"Grotesque" received mostly positive reviews from critics. On Rotten Tomatoes, it garnered an 87% rating, with an average score of 7.17/10 based on 15 reviews. The site consensus reads, " "Grotesque" periodically meanders, but it doesn't dim the tension of a key character's journey in the series' first solo arc episode."

Matt Fowler of IGN gave "Grotesque" an 8/10 rating stating; "Though "Grotesque" introduced us to a few new characters and brought us into a new community, it was really about spending some quality time with Nick and getting into his headspace a little more. And it worked. It wasn't exactly riveting stuff, but it did show us that this series stands a better chance of dusting itself off now that the ensemble's been split up."

=== Ratings ===
"Grotesque" was seen by 3.86 million viewers in the United States on its original air date, below the previous episodes rating of 4.39 million.
