= Eye of the Beholder (Fear the Walking Dead) =

- Fear the Walking Dead episode
- Episode no.: Season 3 Episode 1
- Directed by: Andrew Bernstein
- Written by: Dave Erickson
- Original air date: June 4, 2017
- Running time: 47 minutes

Guest appearances
- Noel Fisher as Willy; Lindsay Pulsipher as Charlene Daley; Michael William Freeman as Blake Sarno; Ross McCall as Steven

Episode chronology
| ← Previous "North" | Next → "The New Frontier" |
- Fear the Walking Dead (season 3)

"Eye of the Beholder" is the first episode of the third season of the post-apocalyptic horror television series Fear the Walking Dead, which aired on AMC on June 4, 2017, along with the following episode "The New Frontier".

This episode marks the first appearance of the Otto brothers: Troy Otto (Daniel Sharman) and Jake Otto (Sam Underwood), who both play major roles in this season.

== Plot ==
Travis, Madison and Alicia are captured by an armed group and taken to a military compound, where Travis is separated from them and is taken to a basement; Madison and Alicia are taken to an office. At the basement, Travis finds himself with Nick, an injured Luciana and other captives. The captives are shot to see how long it takes for them to turn. Travis, Luciana and Nick attempt to escape, Nick and Luciana descending into a sewer but Travis is re-captured and made to fight the dead in a pit. Madison and Alicia attack Troy, impaling one of his eyes with a spoon and taking him hostage. Madison demands that her family be released. Nick finds a horde of walkers at the end of the sewer and makes his way back. The family is reunited but the compound is overrun with walkers, forcing everyone to leave. Travis, Luciana and Alicia escape aboard a helicopter while Madison and Nick leave in a truck with Troy.

== Reception ==
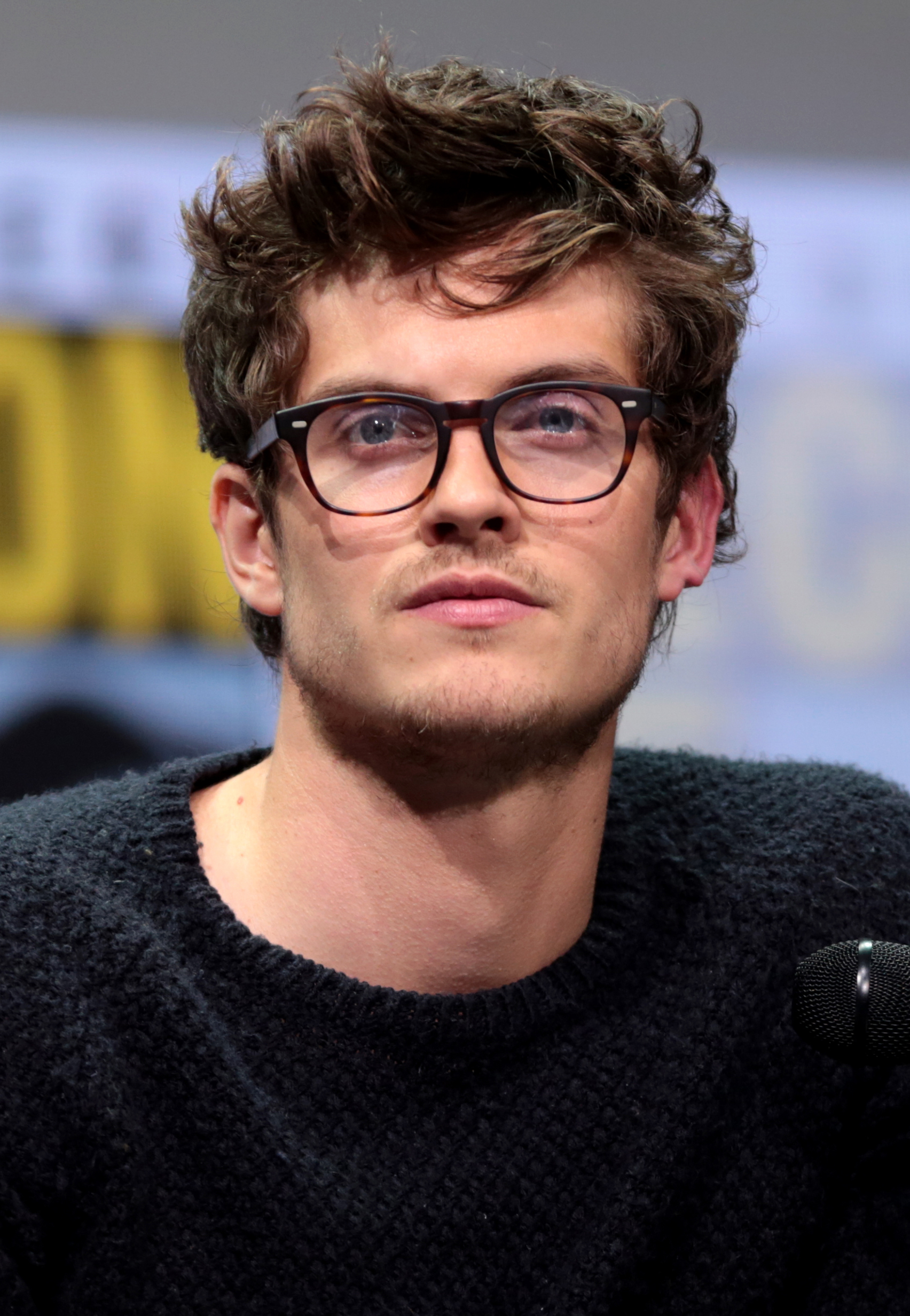
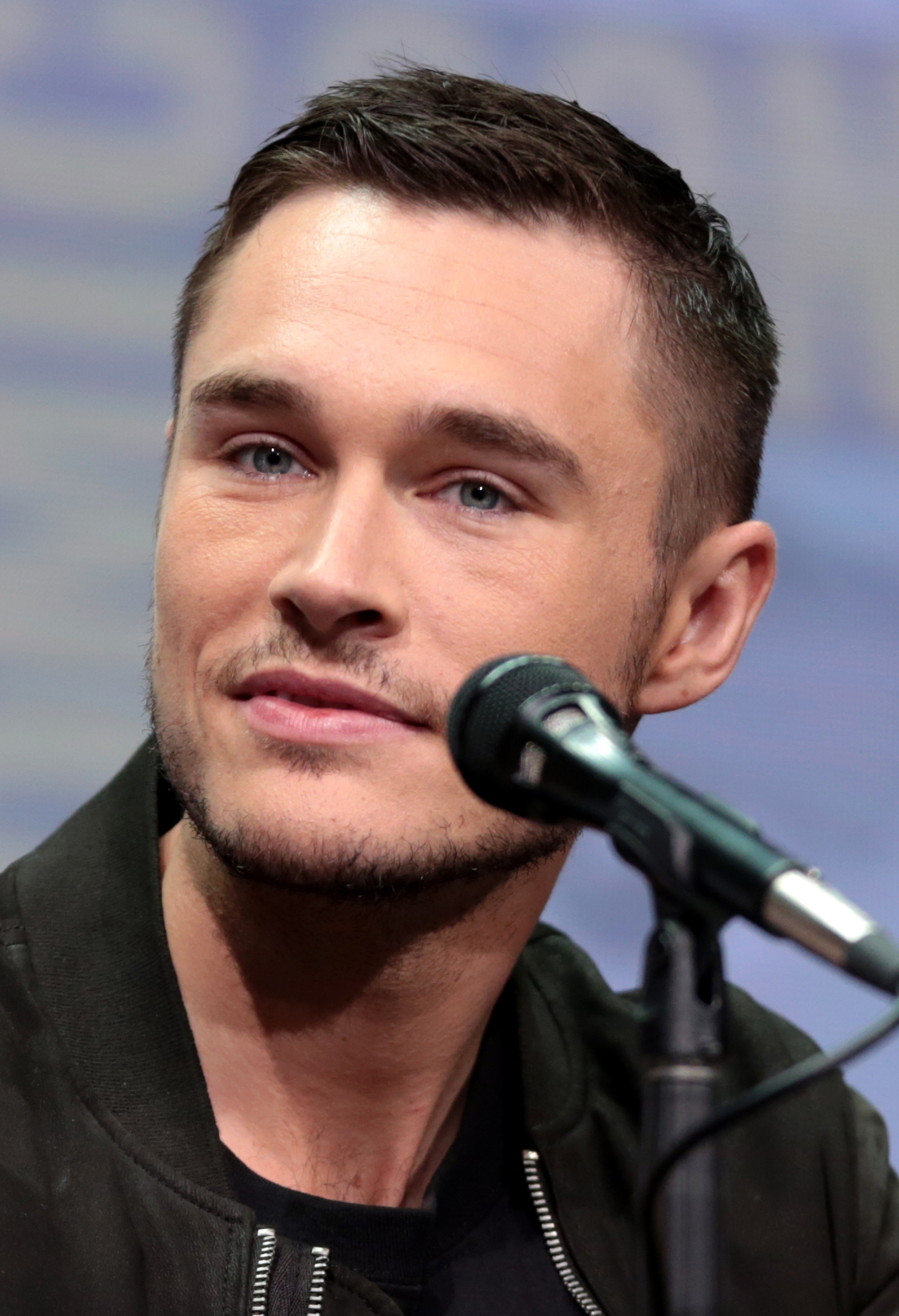
Daniel Sharman (Troy Otto) and Sam Underwood (Jake Otto) made their first appearances in "Eye of the Beholder".

"Eye of the Beholder", together with the next episode "The New Frontier", received critical acclaim from critics. On Rotten Tomatoes, "Eye of the Beholder" garnered an 88% rating, with an average score of 7.88/10 based on 8 reviews.

In a joint review along with the following episode, Matt Fowler of IGN gave "Eye of the Beholder" and "The New Frontier" an 8.5/10.0 rating together, stating; "Fear the Walking Dead's two-part opener pulled very few punches as it unleashed gore galore and shocked us with a big character death that worked to fuel the story going forward. Sure, the Clarks might have to stay at Brokejaw for a while and the season may feel a bit stifled at some point because of it, but the characters seem to be instinctually making good decisions right now and that's enough to keep the engine humming."

=== Ratings ===
"Eye of the Beholder" was seen by 3.11 million viewers in the United States on its original air date, above the second-season finales rating of 3.05 million.
