= Dave Erickson =

American television writer and producer

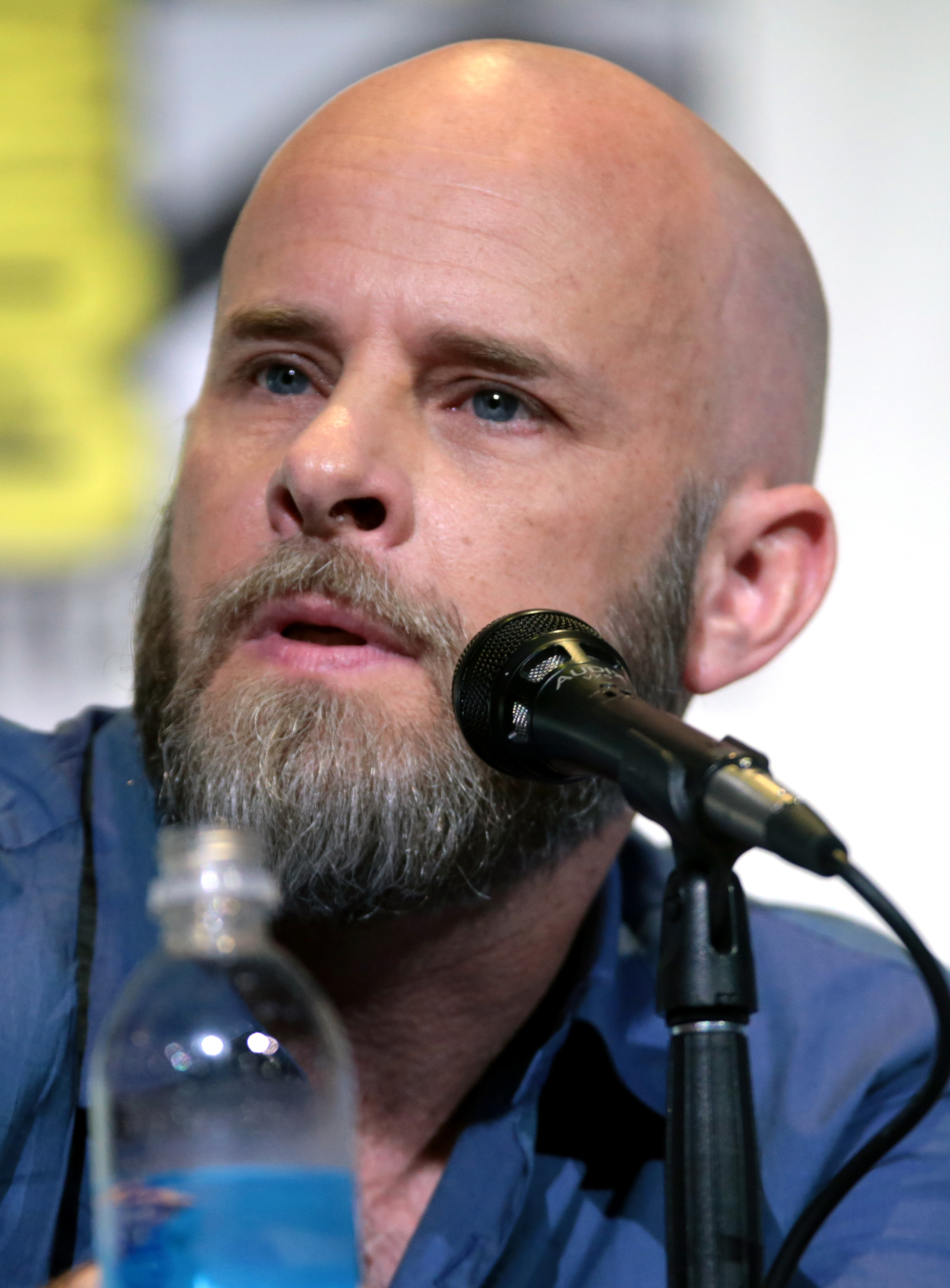
- Erickson at the 2016 San Diego Comic-Con
- Born: David C. Erickson; 1970–71 (age 54–55); Raynham, Massachusetts, U.S.
- Other name: David Erickson
- Education: Williams College (2000)
- Occupations: Television writer and producer
- Years active: 2002–present
- Notable work: Fear the Walking Dead
- Spouse: Sheri Elwood
- Children: 3

David C. Erickson (born 1970–71) is an American television writer and producer best known for co-creating Fear the Walking Dead with Robert Kirkman, for which he was showrunner until the end of the third season; stepping down in order to make more shows for AMC. He also created the television series Canterbury's Law, and wrote and produced for the television series, Sons of Anarchy and Low Winter Sun. His most recent role is as showrunner for Mayor of Kingstown, signing on from its second season to its fifth and final season. He was also showrunner for Tulsa King's third season and was initially set to showrun its first spin-off under the name NOLA King, but that has been scrapped and the show will now be produced by Taylor Sheridan under the title, Frisco King.

In 2021, he signed an overall deal with MRC, but it is unknown where that has landed. During late November 2025, he sued AMC Networks over unpaid profits.

== Writing Credits ==
=== Films ===
Year	Film	Role
2002	Power and Beauty	Co-writer with William Bast and Paul Huson
2002	Murder in Greenwhich	Writer
2003	D.C. Sniper: 23 Days of Fear	Writer
2004	The Perfect Husband: The Laci Peterson Story	Writer

=== Canterbury's Law (2008) ===
- 1.01 – "Pilot"

=== Sons of Anarchy (2008) ===
- 1.07 – "Old Bones"
- 1.11 – "Capybara" (co-written with Kurt Sutter)
- 2.03 – "Fix"
- 2.10 – "Balm" (co-written with Stevie Long)
- 2.12 – "The Culling" (co-written with Kurt Sutter)
- 3.02 – "Oiled" (co-written with Kurt Sutter)
- 3.05 – "Turning and Turning" (co-written with Marco Ramirez)
- 3.08 – "Lochán Mór" (co-written with Liz Sagal and Kurt Sutter)
- 3.11 – "Bainne" (co-written with Regina Corrado and Kurt Sutter)
- 3.13 – "NS" (co-written with Kurt Sutter)
- 4.02 – "Booster" (co-written with Chris Collins)
- 4.05 – "Brick" (co-written with Brady Dahl)
- 4.08 – "Family Recipe" (co-written with Brady Dahl)
- 4.12 – "Burnt and Purged Away" (co-written with Kurt Sutter)

=== Low Winter Sun (2013) ===
- 1.03 – "No Rounds"
- 1.08 – "Revelations"

=== Believe (2014) ===
- 1.05 – "White Noise"

=== Marco Polo (2014) ===
- 1.06 – "White Moon"

=== Fear the Walking Dead (2015) ===
- 1.01 – "Pilot" (co-written with Robert Kirkman)
- 1.06 – "The Good Man" (co-written with Robert Kirkman)
- 2.01 – "Monster"
- 2.15 – "North"
- 3.01 – "Eye of the Beholder"
- 3.09 – "Minotaur" (co-written with Mike Zunic)
- 3.16 – "Sleigh Ride" (co-written with Mark Richard)

=== Mayor of Kingstown (2021) ===
- 2.01 – "Never Missed a Pigeon" (co-written with Taylor Sheridan)
- 2.10 – "Little Green Ant" (co-written with Regina Corrado)
- 3.01 – "Soldier's Heart"
- 3.10 – "Comeuppance"
- 4.01 – "Coming 'Round the Mountain"
- 4.10 – "Belly of the Beast"

=== Tulsa King (2022) ===
- 3.01 – "Blood and Bourbon" (co-written with Sylvester Stallone)
- 3.09 – "Dead Weight" (storyboarded with Daniel C. Connolly and Ildy Modrovich)
- 3.10 – "Jesus Lizard" (co-written with Sylvester Stallone)

== Personal life ==
From Raynham, Massachusetts, Erickson attended UMass-Amherst as a sophomore and studied Shakespeare in Sheffield, England for a semester. In 1993, at the age of 22, he moved to Los Angeles to begin his career in Hollywood, all the while taking classes at the University of Southern California. After numerous jobs as a production assistant, an executive at Showtime read one of his scripts, ultimately landing him work on Power and Beauty.

He is now married to television producer and screenwriter, Sheri Elwood and has two sons and a daughter named Ella.

== Awards and nominations ==
Year	Award	Category	Work	Result	Ref.
2016	Primetime Emmy Awards	Outstanding Short Form Comedy or Drama Series	Fear The Walking Dead: Flight 462	Nominated	
2017	Primetime Emmy Awards	Outstanding Short Form Comedy or Drama Series	Fear The Walking Dead: Passage	Nominated	
