= Do Not Disturb (Fear the Walking Dead) =

- Fear the Walking Dead episode
- Episode no.: Season 2 Episode 10
- Directed by: Michael McDonough
- Written by: Lauren Signorino
- Original air date: September 4, 2016
- Running time: 45 minutes

Guest appearances
- Karen Bethzabe as Elena Reyes; Kelly Blatz as Brandon Luke; Israel Broussard as James McCallister; Raul Casso as Andrés Diaz; Schuyler Fisk as Jessica Diaz; David Grant Wright as Charles Stowe; Ramses Jimenez as Hector Reyes; Andres Londono as Oscar Diaz; Brenda Strong as Ilene Stowe; Kenny Wormald as Derek

Episode chronology
← Previous "Los Muertos"	Next → "Pablo & Jessica"
- Fear the Walking Dead (season 2)

"Do Not Disturb" is the tenth episode of the second season, and the 16th episode overall of the post-apocalyptic horror television series Fear the Walking Dead, which aired on AMC on September 4, 2016.

== Plot ==
A flashback shows a wedding being hosted inside a hotel, where the father of the bride dies from a heart attack and soon reanimates. The hotel's manager, Elena, quickly flees the room and locks all of the guests in the ballroom in an attempt to contain the outbreak, presumably killing all of them.

In the present, the hotel has been surrounded by a horde of undead, attracted by the noise produced from its lobby. Several undead breach the hotel and begin ascending the staircase. Alicia manages to escape a horde of undead that has entered her floor, and climbs up an elevator shaft where she is rescued by Elena. Though initially hostile, Elena agrees to help her find Madison and Strand if they will help her find her nephew, Hector, who was with her but had recently gone missing. The two of them reach the ground floor of the hotel, where they are soon confronted by several of the surviving hotel guests who escaped the ballroom and have since been living within the hotel, seeking vengeance against Elena. They demand Elena's keys to the hotel in return for safe passage and the release of Hector, who they have taken hostage. Elena gives them the keys, but Alicia releases a horde of undead from a nearby room, distracting the guests. Alicia and Elena take shelter in a locked room, where they reunite with Madison and Strand.

Meanwhile, Travis and Chris travel the Mexican countryside. While Travis tries to hotwire a car, Chris goes to scavenge a nearby building, where he steals supplies from another surviving group but doesn't tell Travis. While they drive off, Travis teaches Chris how to drive. The car soon runs out of gas, forcing the two to pull over and set up camp at night, when they are confronted by the group that Chris stole from, who arrive in a truck. The group reveal themselves to be Americans who were on spring break when the outbreak hit, and explain that they are impressed by Chris's skill in dispatching the undead, and ask if Travis and Chris want to join their group. Chris takes a liking to them, but Travis does not trust them. He does accept their offer of driving to a nearby town, though he plans to leave with Chris upon arriving there. They spend the night at the camp, and depart in the group's truck the following morning. While on the road, they stop at a farm to scavenge supplies, but are confronted by the farmer who lives there. The farmer shoots one of the Americans in the leg, prompting Chris to shoot and kill the farmer, to Travis's horror.

== Reception ==
"Do Not Disturb" received negative reviews from critics. On Rotten Tomatoes, it garnered a 55% rating, with an average score of 6.86/10 based on 11 reviews. The site consensus reads, "'Do Not Disturb' gains ground by focusing on Travis and Chris' father/son relationship, but also struggles to successfully introduce a new potential villain to the proceedings."

Matt Fowler of IGN gave "Do Not Disturb" a 7.4/10.0 rating stating; "Fear the Walking Dead has some good, quieter things going on related to character and family, but its larger violence-related beats are faltering - especially when it comes to an over-reliance on cliffhangers and off-camera saves. It's a trite gimmick that The Walking Dead took a long time to finally land on so it's disappointing to see this show tap the vein so early on."

=== Ratings ===
"Do Not Disturb" was seen by 2.99 million viewers in the United States on its original air date, below the previous episodes rating of 3.66 million.
