= Rubén Carbajal =

American actor

Rubén J. Carbajal
- Born: February 26, 1993 (age 33); San Francisco, California
- Education: Cal State Fullerton
- Occupation: Television actor

Rubén J. Carbajal (born February 26, 1993) is an American actor who has appeared on many television series, most notably the mini series Kingpin. In this series, Carbajal worked with actors such as Yancey Arias, Sheryl Lee, Bobby Cannavale, Angela Alvarado Rosa, and many more. Rubén started his acting career with commercials when he was 5 years old, then moved to TV series acting. Along with commercials for Chuck E. Cheese and Propositions, he was also on a college student's film One Last Run in which he starred as the son of the main character. He has appeared on the following TV series: Zoey 101, Punk'd, and starred on NBC's Kingpin. Rubén attended Loyola High School of Los Angeles and graduated in 2011. Rubén portrayed the dual roles of John Laurens/Philip Hamilton on the first national tour of Hamilton and reprised the roles on the third national tour, which began in Puerto Rico, January 2019. He currently plays the roles in the Broadway production.
