= Karen Bethzabe =

Mexican actress

- Born: Mazatlán, Sinaloa, Mexico
- Occupation: Actress
- Years active: 2007–present

Karen Bethzabe is a Mexican actress, best known for her role on Fear the Walking Dead.

== Career ==
Bethzabe most notable role was on the AMC television show Fear the Walking Dead, as Elena Reyes a zombie apocalypse survivor who had to make a terrible decision.

Television audiences first got to know Karen after landing the role of Paulette Vazquez in the CBS show CSI, and as Eufemia Garcia in the Freeform series Switched at Birth. She has also emerged in numerous indie films, including producing and starring in the film Death and Cremation alongside Oscar nominee Brad Dourif and in Erahm Christopher's debut feature film LISTEN.

== Filmography ==
=== Film ===
Year	Film	Role	Notes
2008	Reward	Rosa	Short film
2009	Murderabilia	Louisa	Short film
2010	Death and Cremation	Maria	
2014	Sleeping with the Dead	Karen Fuentes	Short film
2016	Listen	Rosa Ramirez	
2022	Babylon	Silvia Torres	

=== Television ===
Year	TV Show	Role	Notes
2007	Secretos	Camila Rodriguez	Episode: Abandonada
2011	CSI: Crime Scene Investigation	Paulette Vasquez	Episode: Maid Man
2014	Dead Men the Series	Lady Walters	Episode: Lady Waters
2015	Switched at Birth	Eufemia Garcia	Episode: Instead of Damning the Darkness, It's Better to Light a Little Lantern
2016–2017	Fear the Walking Dead	Elena Reyes	7 episodes
2023	Casa Grande	Natalia Cortez	5 episodes
