= Los Muertos (Fear the Walking Dead) =

- Fear the Walking Dead episode
- Episode no.: Season 2 Episode 9
- Directed by: Deborah Chow
- Written by: Alan Page
- Original air date: August 28, 2016
- Running time: 45 minutes

Guest appearances
- Paul Calderon as Alejandro Nuñez; Alejandro Edda as Marco Rodriguez; Danay Garcia as Luciana Galvez

Episode chronology
← Previous "Grotesque"	Next → "Do Not Disturb"
- Fear the Walking Dead (season 2)

"Los Muertos" (Spanish for The Dead) is the ninth episode of the second season, and the 15th episode overall of the post-apocalyptic horror television series Fear the Walking Dead, which aired on AMC on August 28, 2016.

== Plot ==
After being treated for his injuries and malnourishment, Nick spends several days recovering in Luciana's community, La Colonia, which he observes only has one entrance that requires anybody to pass through a horde of undead. One afternoon, he is shocked to see one man voluntarily enter the horde and be devoured, while the rest of the community chants ceremoniously. Luciana explains that those who are infected or terminally ill sacrifice themselves to help build "the wall"; the horde of undead which serves as a defensive barrier for the community. The only way to enter or exit is to cover oneself in the blood of the undead and quietly pass through, preventing outside threats from entering undetected. A few days later, Luciana recruits Nick to accompany her on a supply run to a nearby supermarket, which is controlled by an armed gang known as Los Hermanos. Luciana offers the group some oxycodone, granting them entry into the supermarket where they are permitted to take one shopping cart's worth of supplies. While leaving, however, Nick is caught trying to shoplift a Gansito, but he manages to bargain for his life - and increased supplies for the community - by threatening to cut off the supply of oxycodone that La Colonia has been providing. The group agrees to increase the amount of supplies that La Colonia traders may take, and lets Nick go unharmed. Later on, Luciana scolds Nick for his recklessness, as she believes that Los Harmanos will now have greater interested in determining the location of La Colonia. Nick is brought before the community's leader, a former pharmacist named Alejandro, who explains to Nick that he keeps the community together by preaching that the undead plague is merely a test from God, and that those that survive will inherit the Earth.

Meanwhile, Madison, Strand, Alicia, and Ofelia flee the burning wreckage of Celia's compound, intending to get back to the Abigail. However, they find out that the vessel has been stolen, leaving them without any shelter. They are forced to scavenge a nearby hotel for supplies; they discover that the hotel has running hot water and several barricades, indicating that it was recently being inhabited. Alicia and Ofelia search the rooms, where Ofelia reveals to Alicia that she doesn't believe the group will survive for much longer. The two take a break from scavenging and decide to clean up. After Alicia returns from taking a shower, she finds that Ofelia has gone missing. Meanwhile, Madison and Strand get drunk in the hotel's bar as they express their various frustrations with life. While intoxicated, Madison begins throwing glasses against the wall and Strand begins slamming the keys on a piano; the noise attracts the attention of nearby undead, which soon surround the hotel, trapping all four inside.

== Reception ==
"Los Muertos" received mixed reviews from critics. On Rotten Tomatoes, it garnered a 62% rating, with an average score of 6.96/10 based on 13 reviews. The site consensus reads, "While fully investing in the characters at this point seems a questionable undertaking, "Los Muertos" manages to present its two intriguing storylines in an appealing manner."

Matt Fowler of IGN gave "Los Muertos" a 7.5/10.0 rating stating; ""Los Muertos" took the Abigail out of the equation, gave us some quiet moments with the members of Madison's group, and then showed us that Nick had, once again, managed to link up with some survivors who possessed rather peculiar and fanatical ideas about the undead. Overall it was good, though I wish Madison and Strand's drinking hadn't been the cause of their attack - and that the episode didn't leave us hanging the way it did."

=== Ratings ===
"Los Muertos" was seen by 3.66 million viewers in the United States on its original air date, slightly below the previous episodes rating of 3.86 million.
