= Danay García =

American actress

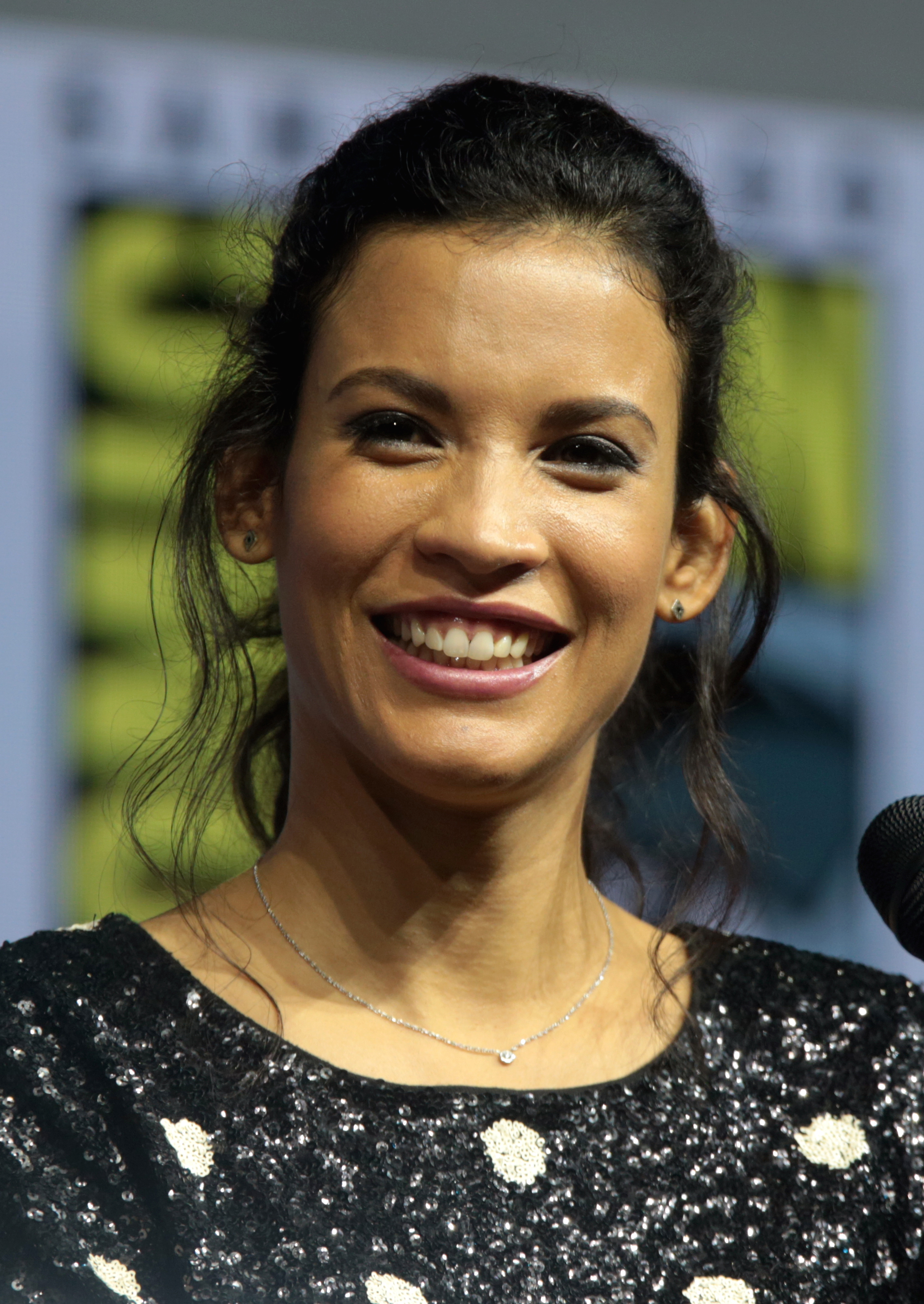
- García at the 2018 San Diego Comic-Con.
- Born: 1984 or 1985 (age 41–42); Havana, Cuba
- Occupations: Actress; model
- Years active: 2006–present

Danay García (born 1984 or 1985) is an American actress of Cuban descent. She is best known for her roles as Sofía Lugo on Fox's drama series Prison Break (2007–2009) and Luciana Galvez on AMC's horror drama series Fear the Walking Dead (2016–2023).

== Early life ==
García was born in Havana, Cuba, She began ballet studies at the Debby Allen Dance Academy, while continuing her acting studies. At the age of 15, she decided to steer her dance career toward acting. At the age of 20, she moved to the United States with her 18-month-old son. She took accent coaching so people could understand her English better.

== Career ==
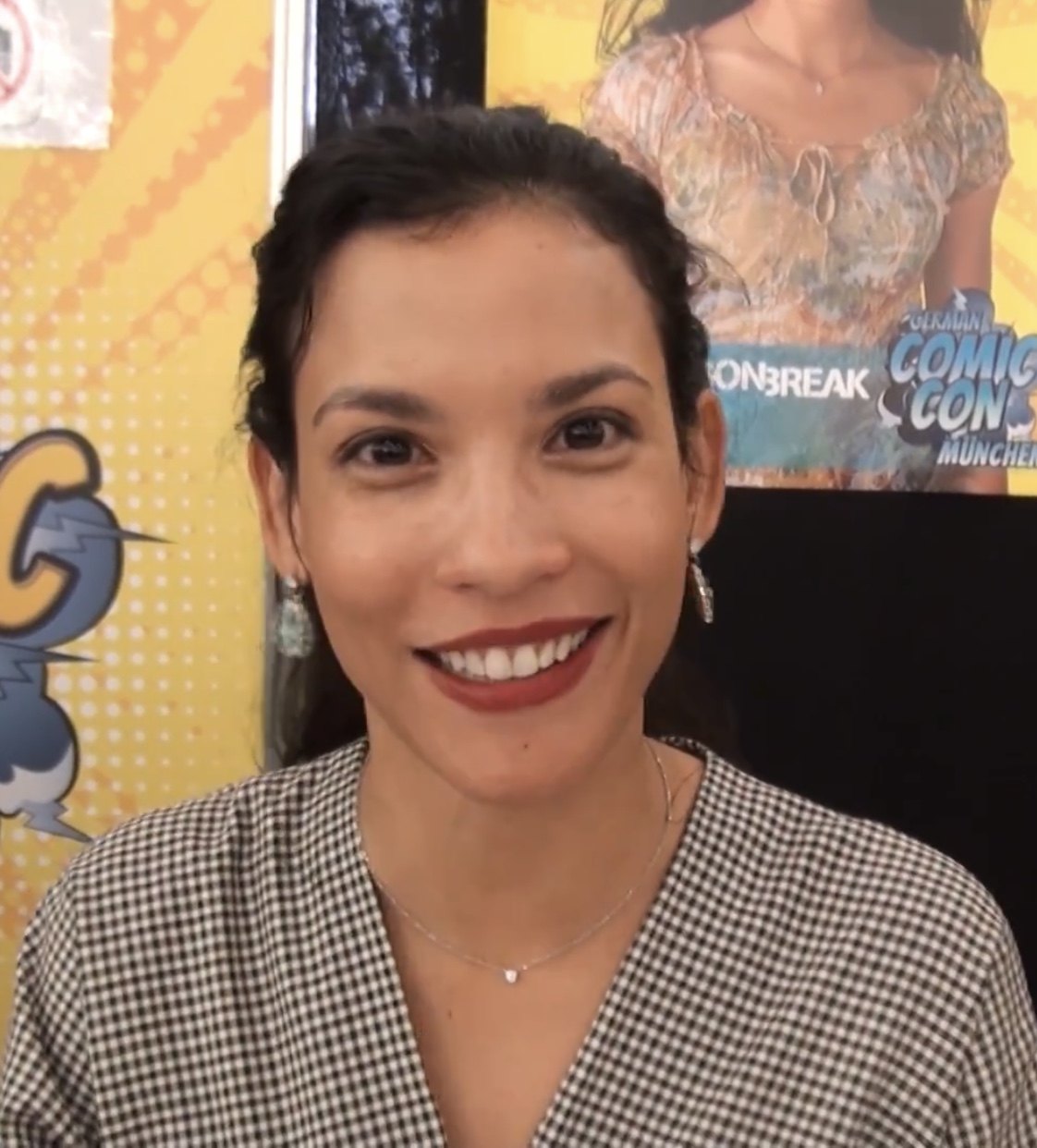
Danay García representing Prison Break at GFCC München 2018

Her first role for the public was playing the lead role in Maria Antonia, by Eugenio Hernandez Espinosa, in a Havana theatre production when she was 17. García booked her first U.S. feature film role playing opposite Marisa Tomei in Danika.

García appeared in CSI: Miami, and CSI: NY, feature film From Mexico with Love, then landed her big break as series regular, Sofía Lugo, in the Golden Globe Award winning Fox television series, Prison Break, which was also broadcast in Cuba, so her family were able to see her work.

During the 2007 writer's strike, García made it through multiple rounds of auditions for the Bond girl, Camille Montes, in MGM and Eon Productions' Quantum of Solace, but had to be dropped due to a clause in her Fox contract. In 2009, she played the principal guest role of Anna in A&E's series The Cleaner, and later appeared in the feature film Rehab. García has worked as a co-writer, co-creator and producer for TV and film projects. García was next cast as Coqui in the Fina Torres' helmed drama, Liz in September, which shot on location in the Caribbean Islands around Venezuela, before winning the lead role of Monica in the U.S.–Brazilian co-production, her first significant work in a comedy in Man Camp,

Since 2016, García has portrayed Luciana Galvez on the AMC horror drama series Fear the Walking Dead. She guest starred in an episode of Hawaii Five-0 in 2017.

== Filmography ==
=== Film ===
Year	Title	Role	Notes
2006	Danika	Myra	
2009	From Mexico with Love	Maria	
2010	Peep World	Attractive P.A.	
2011	Rehab	Michelle Lopez	
2011	Cenizas Eternas	Elena	
2012	Choices	Sonora Garcia	Short
2013	Man Camp	Monica	
2014	Liz in September	Coqui	
2016	Widows	Natalie Cruz	Short
2017	Havana, Habana	Maria	
2017	Boost	Sheeren Montes	
2017	Sniper: Ultimate Kill	Kate Estrada	
2017	Avenge the Crows	Loca	
2021	Spiked	Diana	
2021	Baby Money	Minny	

=== Television ===
Year	Title	Role	Notes
2007	CSI: Miami	Camille Tavez	Episode: "No Man's Land"
2007–09	Prison Break	Sofía Lugo	Main cast (seasons 3–4); 15 episodes
2009	CSI: NY	Flora Pollock	Episode: "No Good Deed"
2009	The Cleaner	Anna	Episode: "Crossing the Threshold"
2013	Supernatural	Ellie	Episode: "Trial and Error"
2016–23	Fear the Walking Dead	Luciana Galvez	Recurring (season 2), main (seasons 3–8), 52 episodes Also director: "Anton"
2017	Hawaii Five-0	Elena Sachs	Episode: "He Kaha Lu'u Ke Ala, Mai Ho'okolo Aku"
2020	50 States of Fright	Maria Vazquez	Episode: "Destino (Florida) - Part 1-3"
2026	M.I.A.	Carmen / Leah	Main cast

=== Video games ===
Year	Title	Voice role
2016	Mafia III	Alma Diaz
