= Things Bad Begun =

- Fear the Walking Dead episode
- Episode no.: Season 3 Episode 15
- Directed by: Andrew Bernstein
- Written by: Jami O'Brien
- Original air date: October 15, 2017
- Running time: 45 minutes

Guest appearances
- Michael Greyeyes as Qaletaqa Walker; James Le Gros as Eddie; Jesse Borrego as Efraín Morales; Edwina Findley as Diana; Justin Rain as Lee; Miguel Pérez as El Matarife; Ray McKinnon as Proctor John

Episode chronology
← Previous "El Matadero"	Next → "Sleigh Ride"
- Fear the Walking Dead (season 3)

"Things Bad Begun" is the fifteenth and penultimate episode of the third season of the post-apocalyptic horror television series Fear the Walking Dead, which aired on AMC on October 15, 2017 along with the season finale; "Sleigh Ride". This episode features the apparent death of Troy Otto (Daniel Sharman) as he's killed by Madison Clark (Kim Dickens).

== Plot ==
Alicia brings Diana to the bazaar for treatment and is enlisted to assist a life-saving operation. The patient is John, the President of the Proctors, an outlaw motorcycle gang which is opening a trade route from the Texas gulf coast to San Diego. Troy learns that the Proctors intend to attack the dam and rushes with Nick to warn them. The staff at the dam decide to hold out but if defeat is certain to blow the dam with explosives to deny the Proctors a water monopoly. Walker and Crazy Dog leave to search for survivors from their nation. Strand tells Nick to get his family out, having made a deal with the Proctors and no longer being able to guarantee anyone's safety. Nick is questioned by Daniel about the herd, giving Nick another reason to get them out. When Madison learns that Troy led the herd, she seemingly murders him in front of Nick. Strand opens a gate for the Proctors and in a struggle shoots Daniel in the face. As the Proctors overrun the dam, Strand takes the detonator and hides Madison and Nick.

== Production ==
=== Casting ===
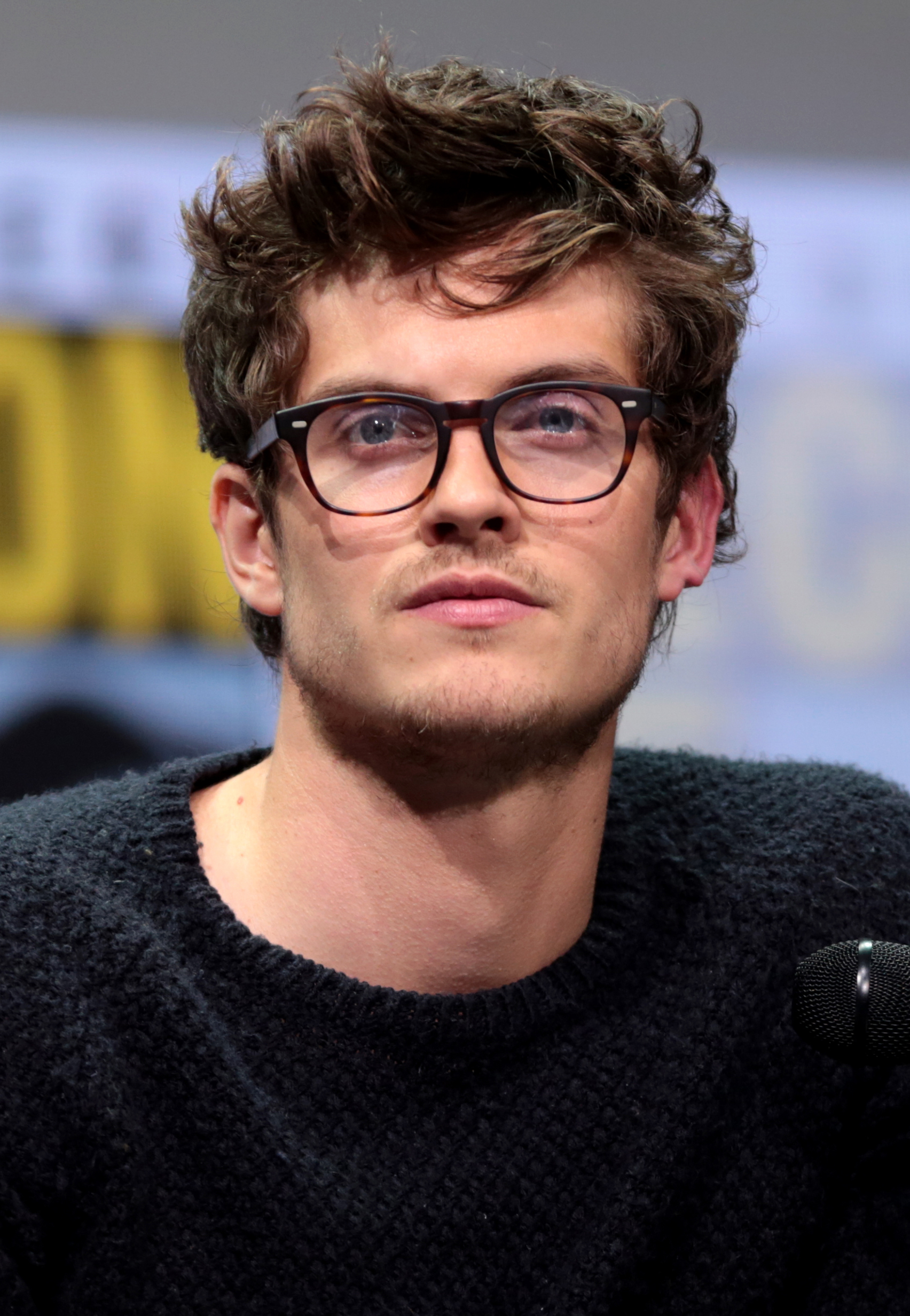
Daniel Sharman made his final regular appearance as Troy Otto in this episode until his return in the eighth season.

This episode marks the final regular appearance of Troy Otto (Daniel Sharman) following his apparent death at Madison's hands, although his body is briefly shown in the next episode. The character would later make a surprise return in the eighth season, having secretly survived the events of "Things Bad Begun."

== Reception ==
In a joint review along with the season finale episode, "Sleigh Ride", Matt Fowler of IGN gave "Things Bad Begun" an 8/10 rating, stating; "Some of the interpersonal moments didn't quite feel right in Fear the Walking Dead's Season 3 close-out, but using the dam as the centerpiece for the endgame, while also introducing a new villain into the mix, made for an exciting finale - even if Madison's haunting dreams were the only thing that resonated emotionally."

Conversely, David S.E Zapanta of Den of Geek gave "Things Bad Begun" a more negative review, with a 2.5/5 rating, stating; "As dynamic and engaging as Ray McKinnon is, he and his underdeveloped proctors felt shoehorned into the end of the season."

=== Ratings ===
"Things Bad Begun" was seen by 2.23 million viewers in the United States on its original air date, the same amount of ratings as the previous episodes.
