= Sleigh Ride (Fear the Walking Dead) =

- Fear the Walking Dead episode
- Episode no.: Season 3 Episode 16
- Directed by: Andrew Bernstein
- Written by: Dave Erickson; Mark Richard
- Original air date: October 15, 2017
- Running time: 42 minutes

Guest appearances
- Michael Greyeyes as Qaletaqa Walker; Justin Rain as Lee; Ray McKinnon as Proctor John

Episode chronology
← Previous "Things Bad Begun"	Next → "What's Your Story?"
- Fear the Walking Dead (season 3)

"Sleigh Ride" is the sixteenth and final episode of the third season of the post-apocalyptic horror television series Fear the Walking Dead, which aired on AMC on October 15, 2017, along with the previous episode; "Things Bad Begun".

== Plot ==
Hiding together, tensions rise between Nick and Madison over Troy's murder and her growing ruthlessness. Proctor John arrives at the dam with Alicia, displeased that Strand wasn't fully able to deliver on their deal; Alicia bargains for Madison's safety. Strand is helping Madison and Nick escape when Lola attacks the Proctors and is killed. For their duplicity John decides to kill all four, starting with Alicia as a mercy. Nick uses the detonator in a standoff, threatening to blow up the dam. Madison, Alicia and Strand escape on a boat. The Proctors begin to move on Nick who receives unexpected help from Walker and Crazy Dog who snipe from a nearby hilltop and Daniel who fights his way across the dam. Nick detonates the explosives, blowing a hole in the dam and the boat is carried through by the current. Nick and Daniel escape while Madison swims to shore alone.

== Production ==
This is the last episode for a departing Dave Erickson as a showrunner. This marks the final appearance of Kim Dickens as Madison alive in the present (since her appearances in season 4 are only flashbacks) until her return in season 7. This is also the final season to have Paul Haslinger as the composer of the series as he is replaced the following season by Danny Bensi and Saunder Jurriaans. This season is the last to feature the original Fear the Walking Dead logo, which was redesigned for the next season's semi-reboot.

=== Casting ===
This episode marks the final appearance of several characters. It is the last appearance Lola Guerrero (Lisandra Tena), who was killed during the episode. It is the last appearance of Qaletaqa Walker (Michael Greyeyes), who manages to survive. This episode also marks the last appearance of several characters who died earlier in the season and appear in one of Madison's dreams, including Travis Manawa (Cliff Curtis), Jeremiah Otto (Dayton Callie) and Jake Otto (Sam Underwood).

== Reception ==
"Sleigh Ride", received critical acclaim from critics. On Rotten Tomatoes, "Sleigh Ride" garnered a perfect 100% rating, with an average score of 8.0/10 based on 7 reviews. In a joint review along with the season finale episode, "Things Bad Begun", Matt Fowler of IGN gave "Sleigh Ride" an 8/10 rating, stating; "Some of the interpersonal moments didn't quite feel right in Fear the Walking Dead's Season 3 close-out, but using the dam as the centerpiece for the endgame, while also introducing a new villain into the mix, made for an exciting finale - even if Madison's haunting dreams were the only thing that resonated emotionally."

=== Ratings ===
The episode was seen by 2.23 million viewers in the United States on its original air date, the same amount of ratings as the previous episodes.
