= Fear the Walking Dead season 3 =

Fear the Walking Dead
- Season 3
- Home media cover art
- Showrunner: Dave Erickson
- Starring: Kim Dickens; Cliff Curtis; Frank Dillane; Alycia Debnam-Carey; Colman Domingo; Mercedes Mason; Danay García; Daniel Sharman; Sam Underwood; Dayton Callie; Lisandra Tena; Rubén Blades
- No. of episodes: 16

Release
- Original network: AMC
- Original release: June 4 – October 15, 2017

Season chronology
- ← Previous; Season 2 Next → Season 4

The third season of Fear the Walking Dead, an American horror-drama television series on AMC, premiered on June 4, 2017, and concluded on October 15, 2017, consisting of sixteen episodes. The series is a companion series and prequel to The Walking Dead, which is based on the comic book series of the same name by Robert Kirkman, Tony Moore, and Charlie Adlard. The executive producers are Kirkman, David Alpert, Greg Nicotero, Gale Anne Hurd, and Dave Erickson, with Erickson as showrunner for his third and final season.

The season follows a dysfunctional, blended family composed of Madison Clark (Kim Dickens), her fiancé Travis Manawa (Cliff Curtis), her daughter Alicia (Alycia Debnam-Carey), her drug-addicted son Nick (Frank Dillane) and his lover Luciana Galvez (Danay García), as they reach the U.S.-Mexico border and find refuge on a ranch owned by the Otto family, consisting of patriarch Jeremiah Otto (Dayton Callie) and his two sons Troy (Daniel Sharman) and Jake (Sam Underwood). Meanwhile, Victor Strand (Colman Domingo) reunites with Daniel Salazar (Rubén Blades), who was presumed dead, who returns to find his daughter Ofelia (Mercedes Mason) who was separated from the group.

== Production ==
AMC renewed the series for a 16-episode third season on April 15, 2016. Production began in January 2017 in Baja, Mexico. This was the final season with co-creator Dave Erickson as showrunner as he left the series after the conclusion of the third season. In February 2017, it was announced that Emma Caulfield was cast in the season. In March 2017, it was revealed that Daniel Sharman joined the cast as a series regular. In April 2017, several new actors were announced having joined the series; including Dayton Callie (reprising his guest role from season 2) and Sam Underwood, who, along with Daniel Sharman play members of the Otto family; and Lisandra Tena as Lola Guerrero.

== Cast ==
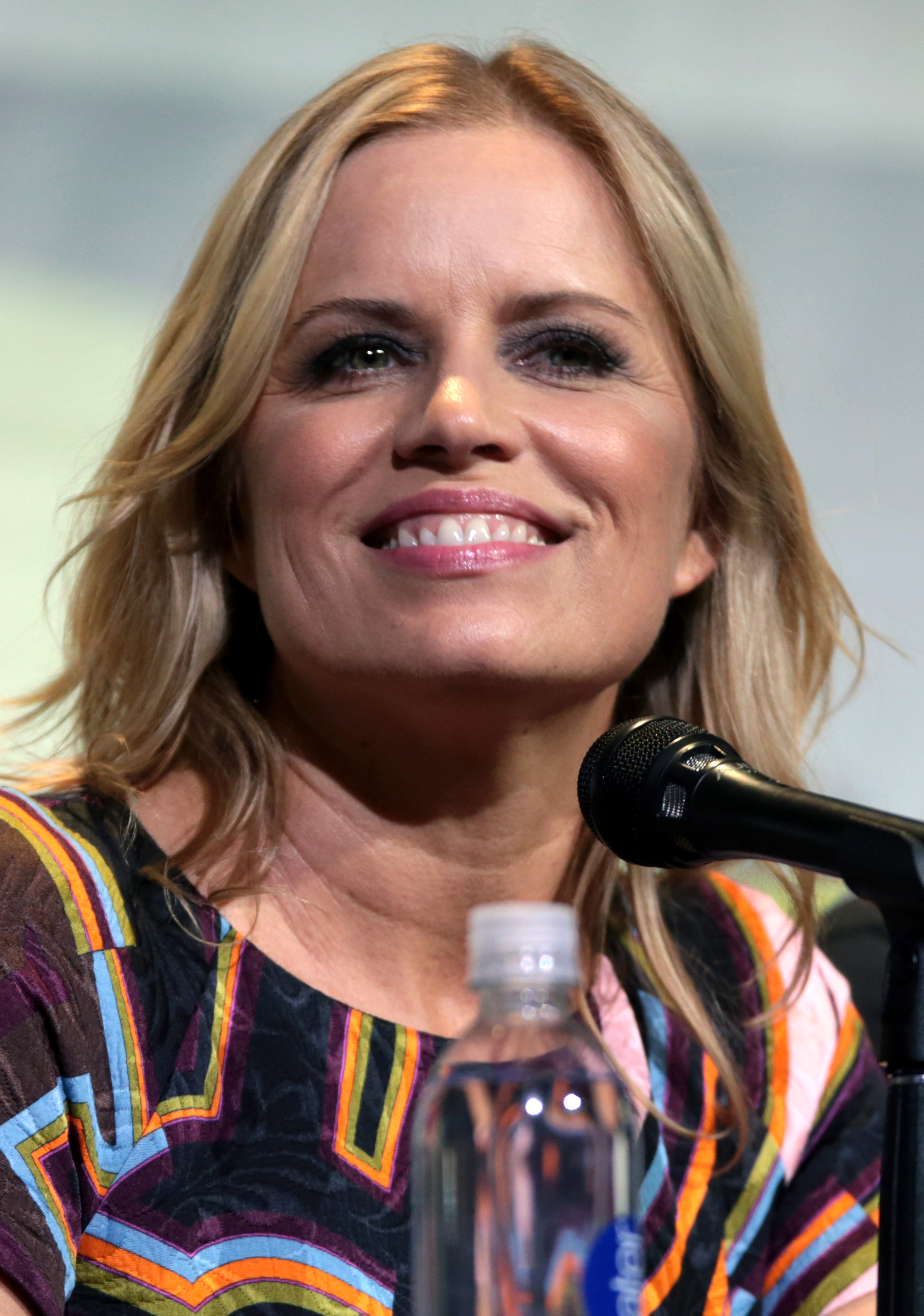
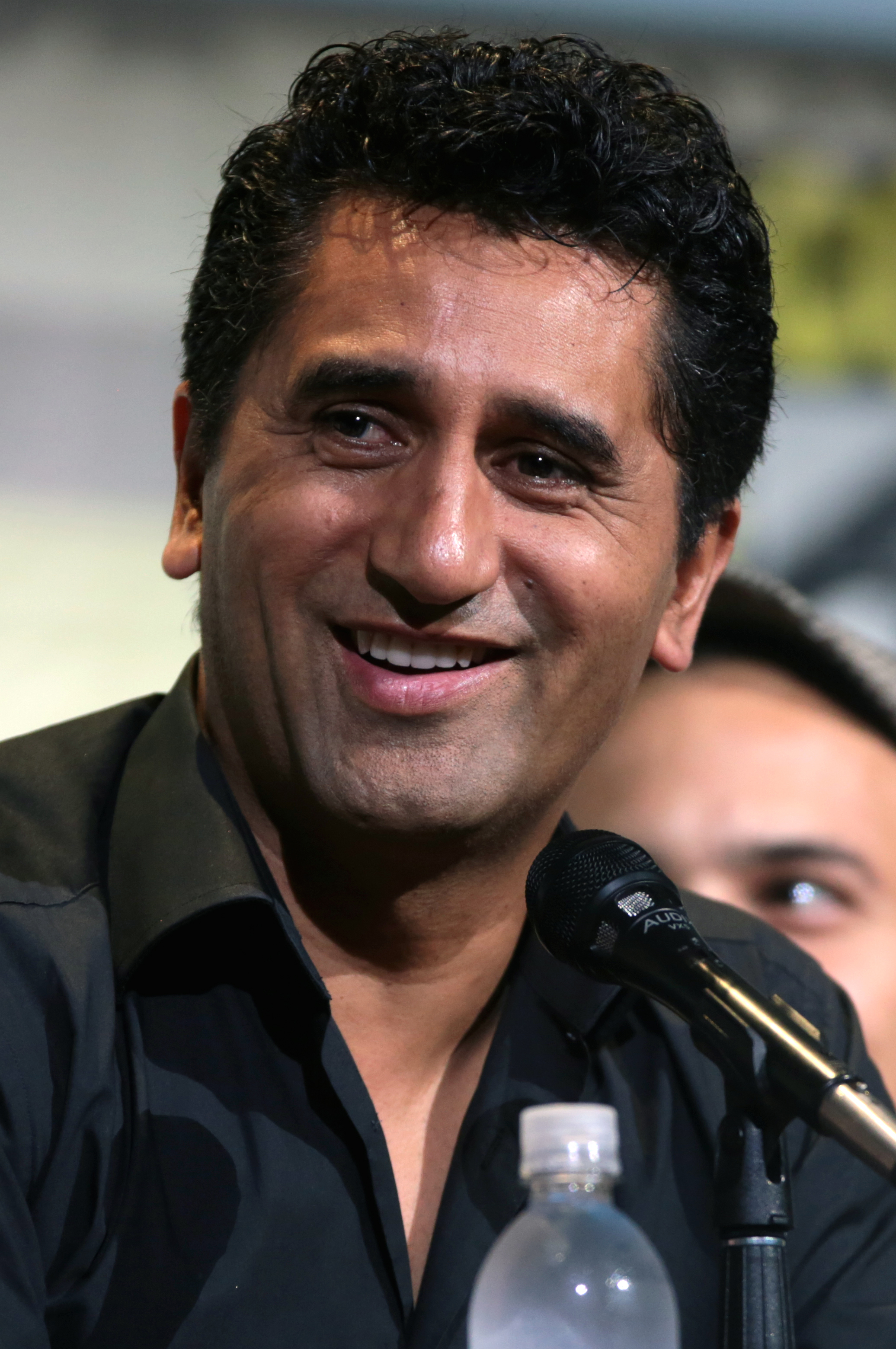
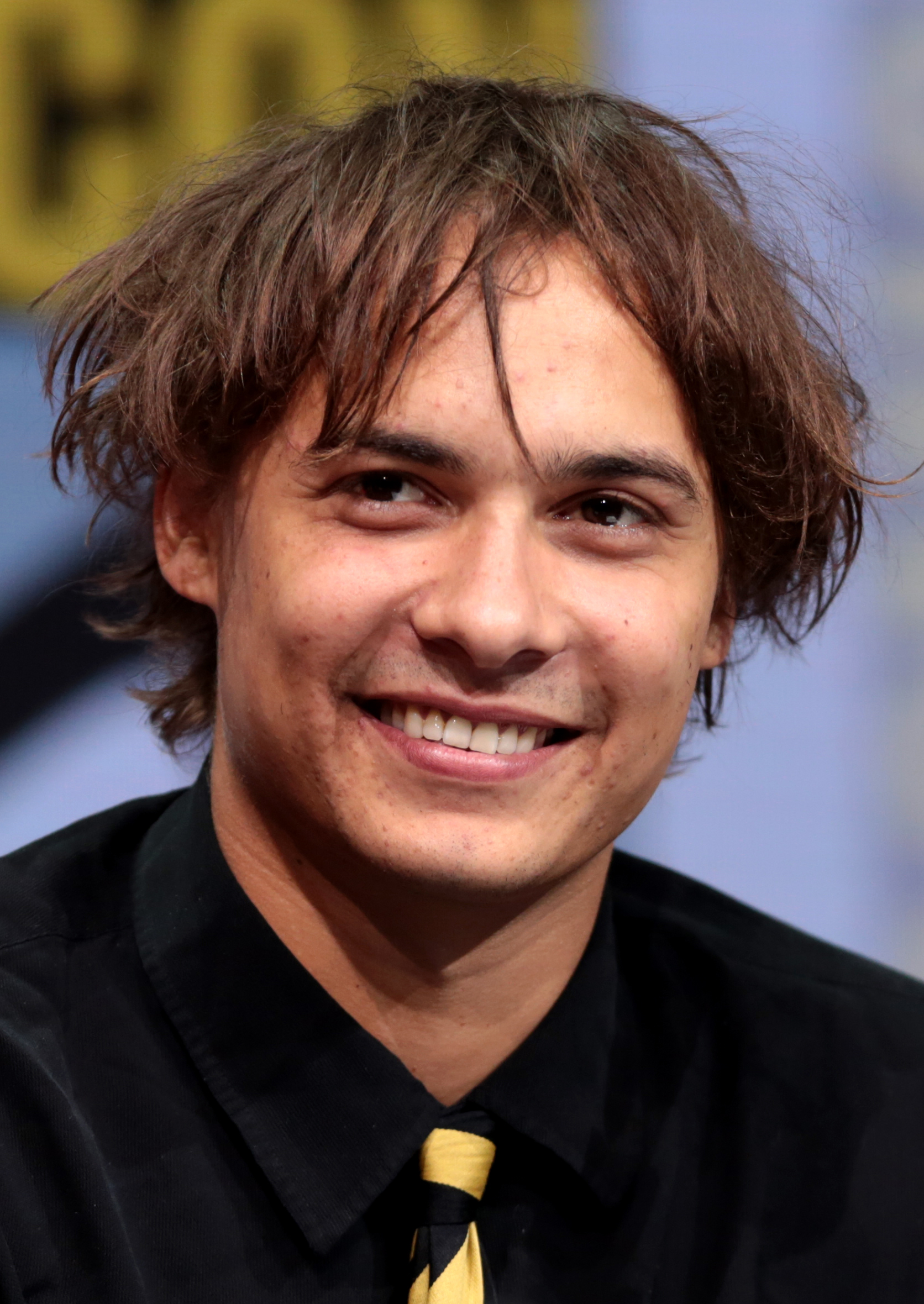
Kim Dickens (Madison Clark), Cliff Curtis (Travis Manawa) and Frank Dillane (Nick Clark)
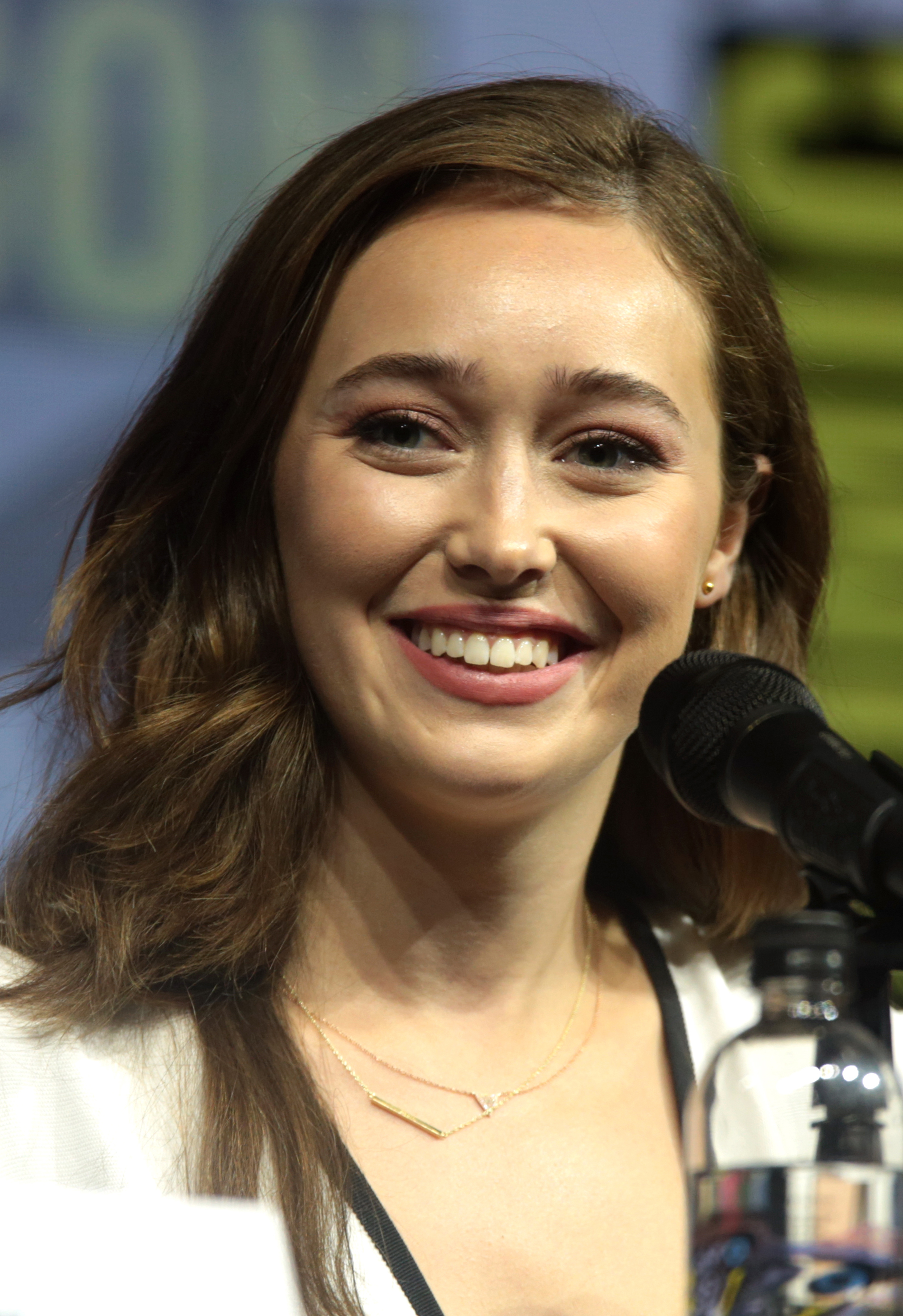
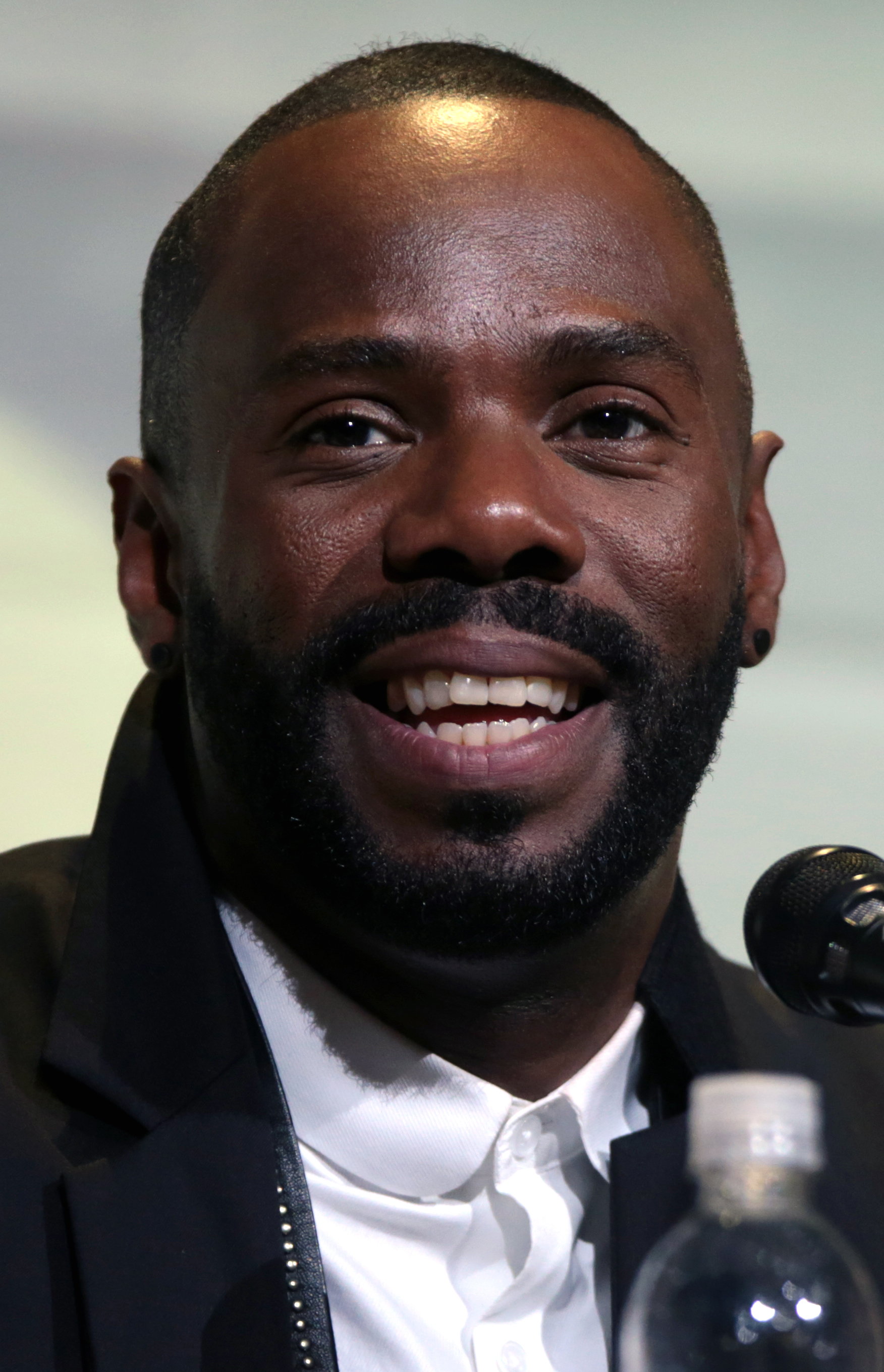
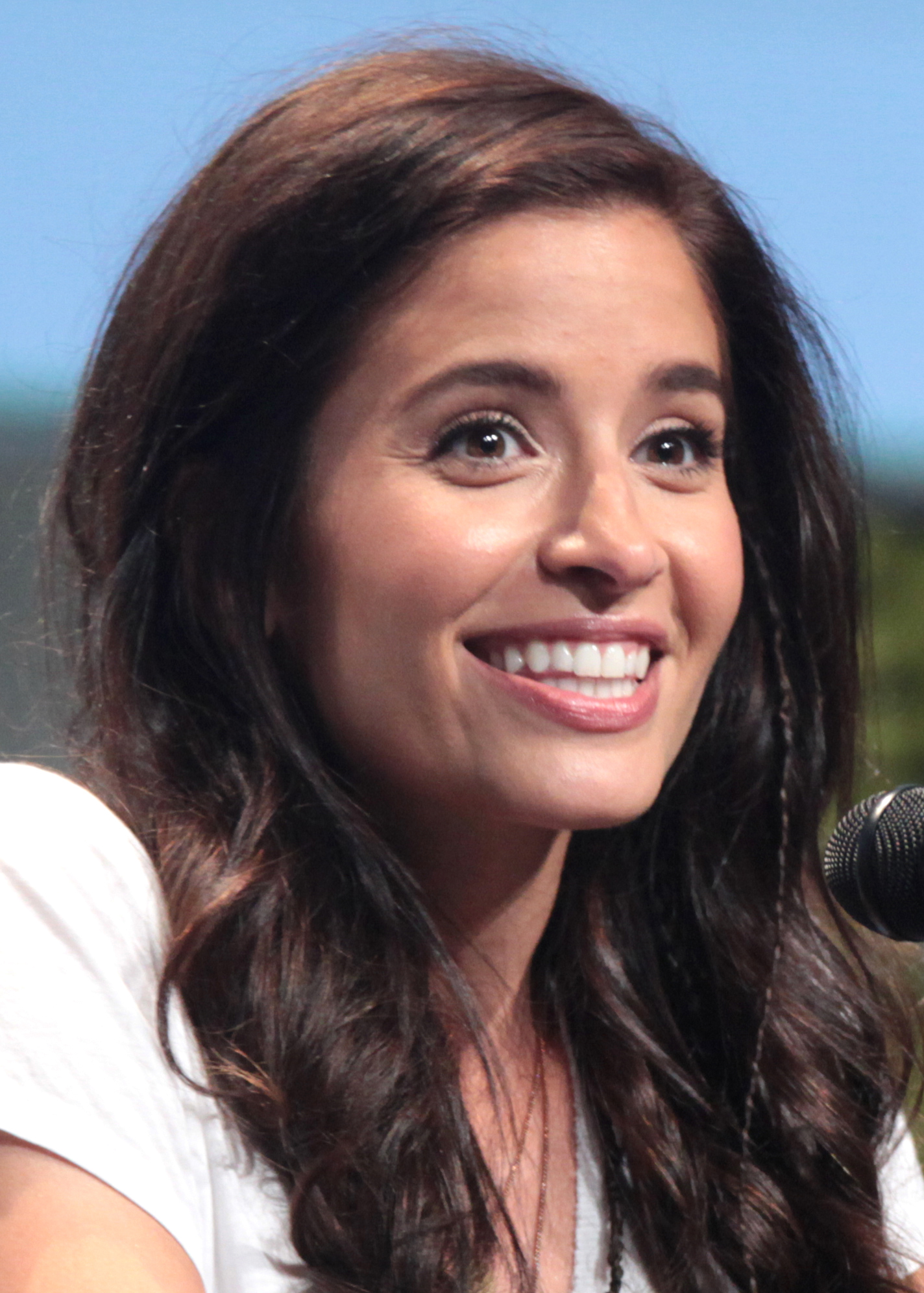
Alycia Debnam-Carey (Alicia Clark), Colman Domingo (Victor Strand) and Mercedes Mason (Ofelia Salazar)
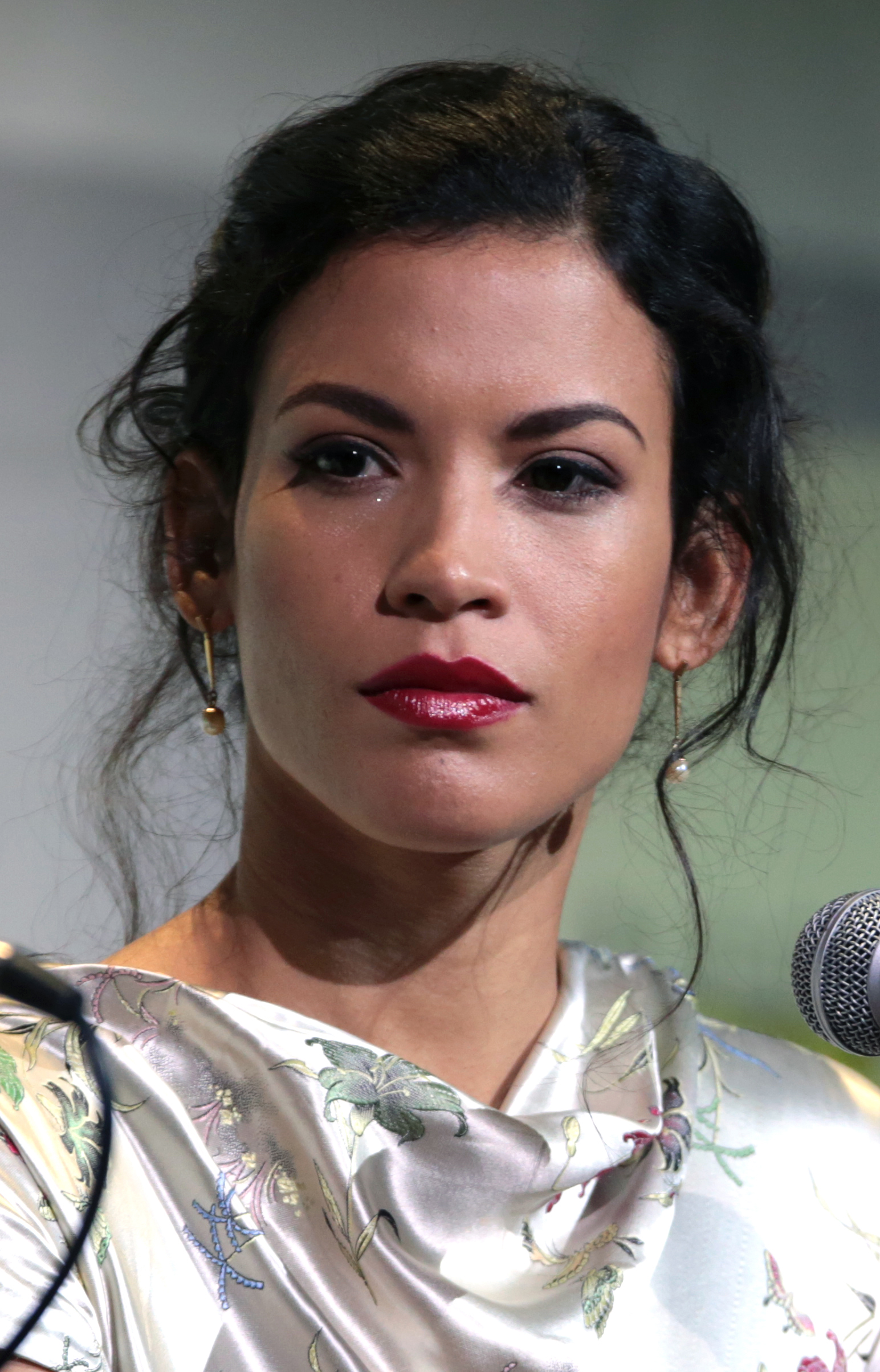
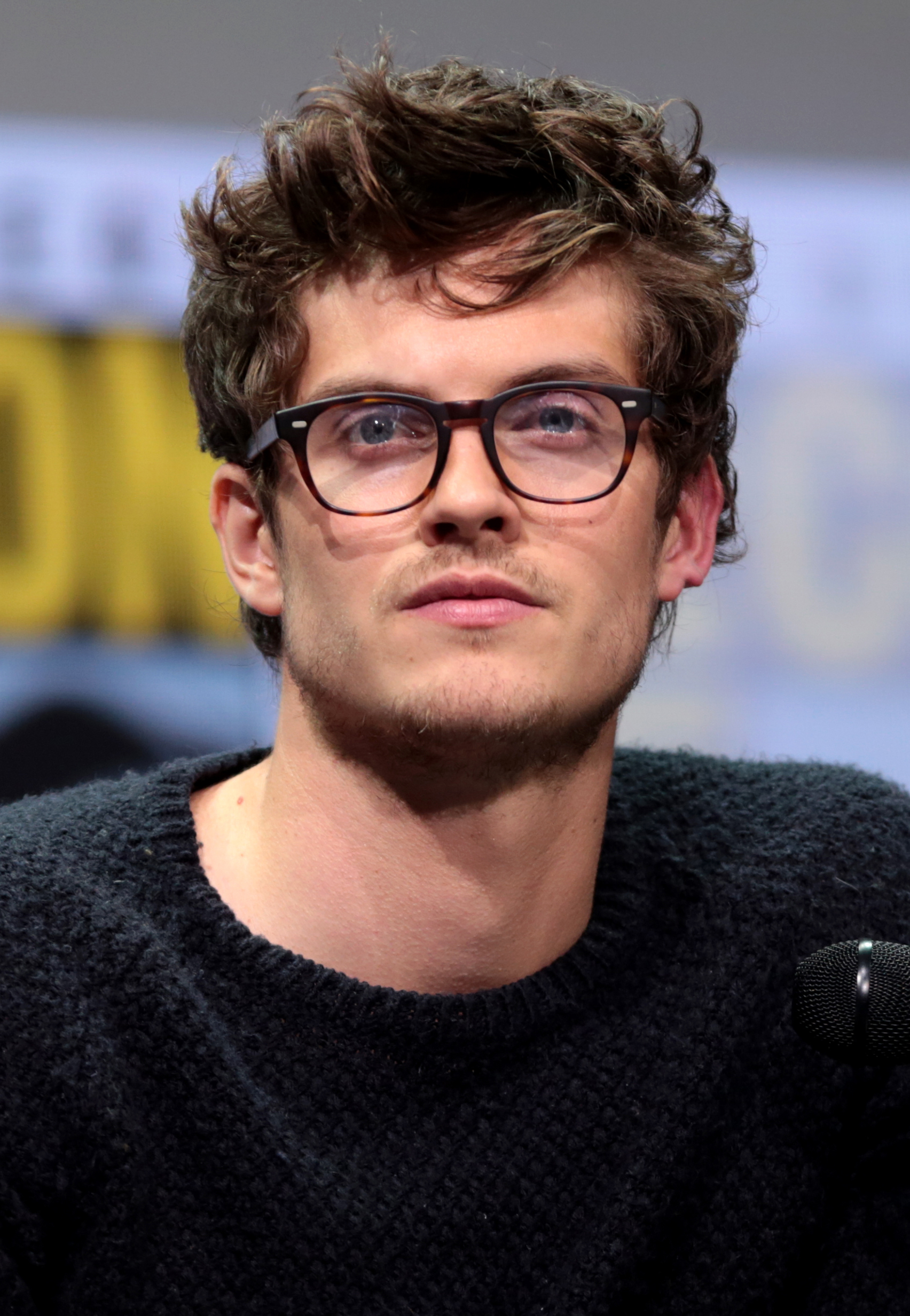
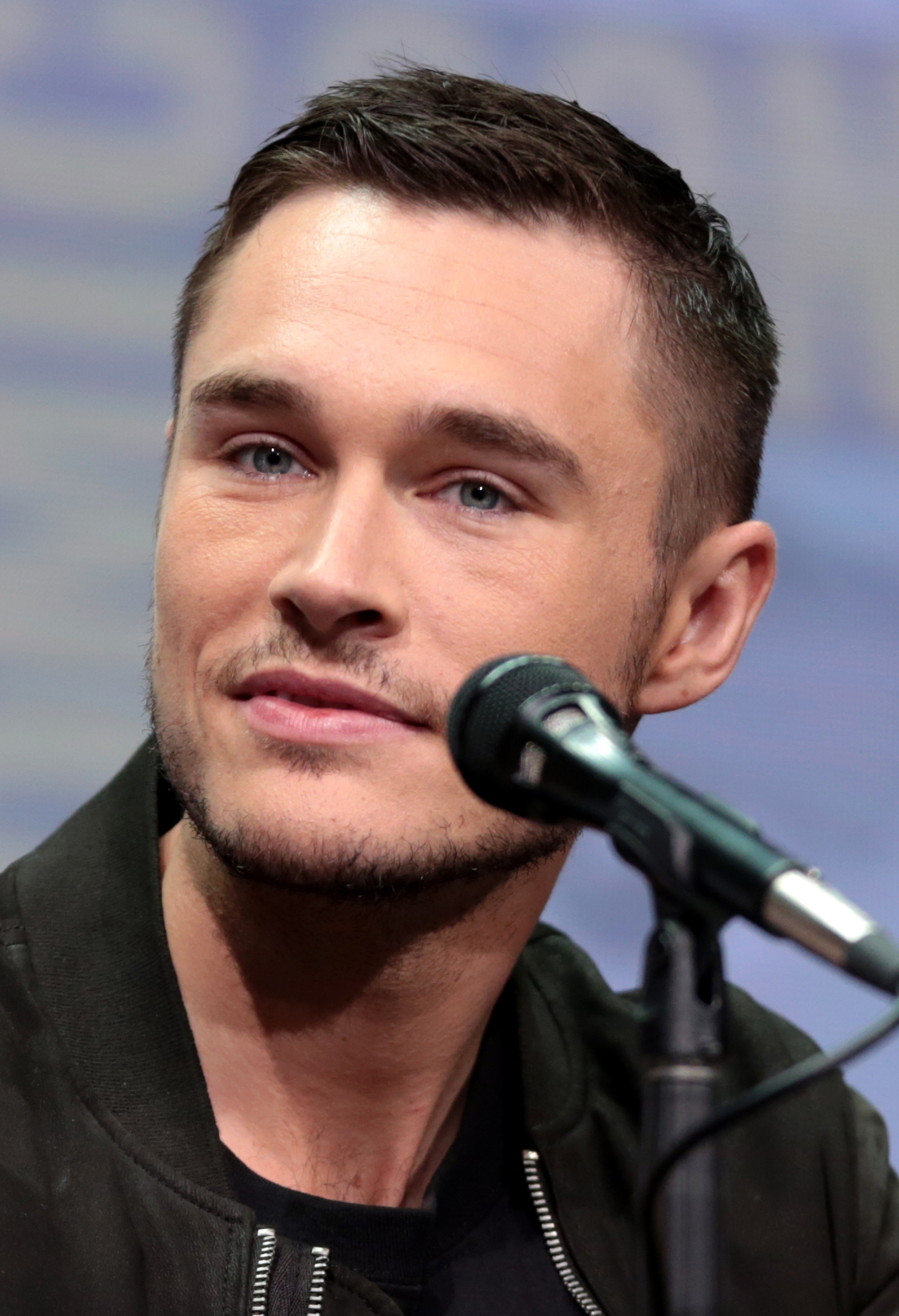
Danay Garcia (Luciana Galvez), Daniel Sharman (Troy Otto) and Sam Underwood (Jake Otto)
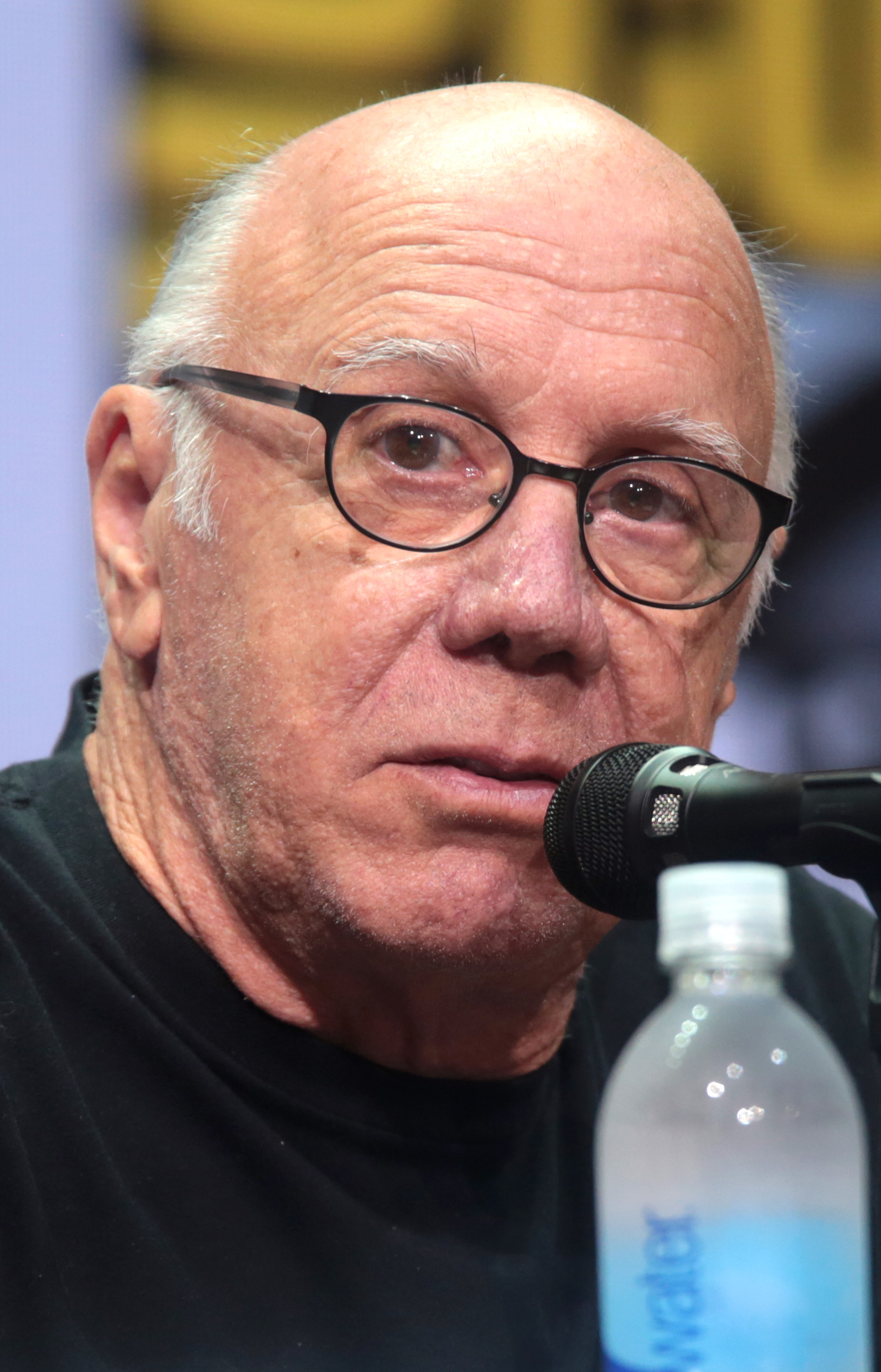
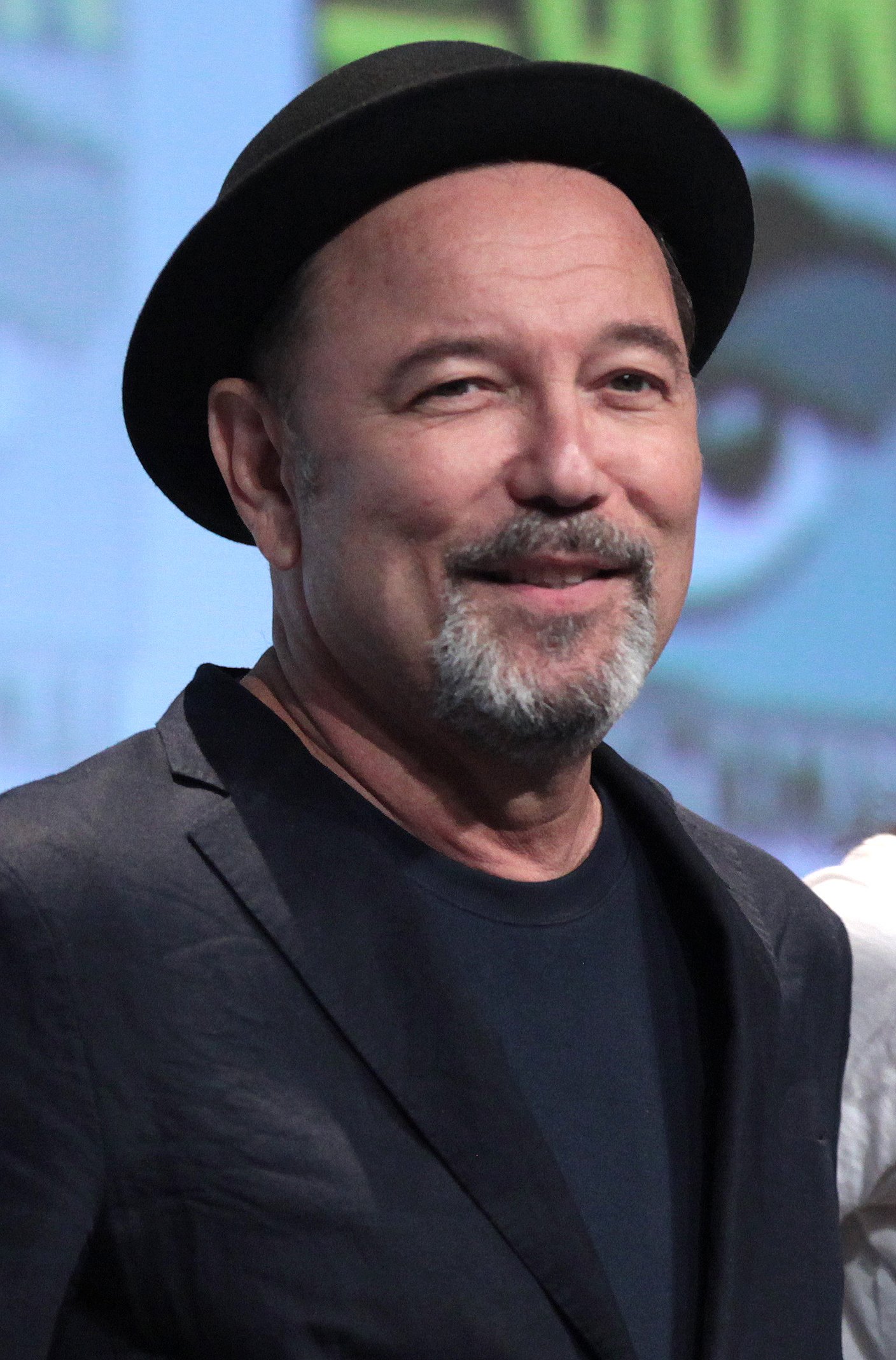
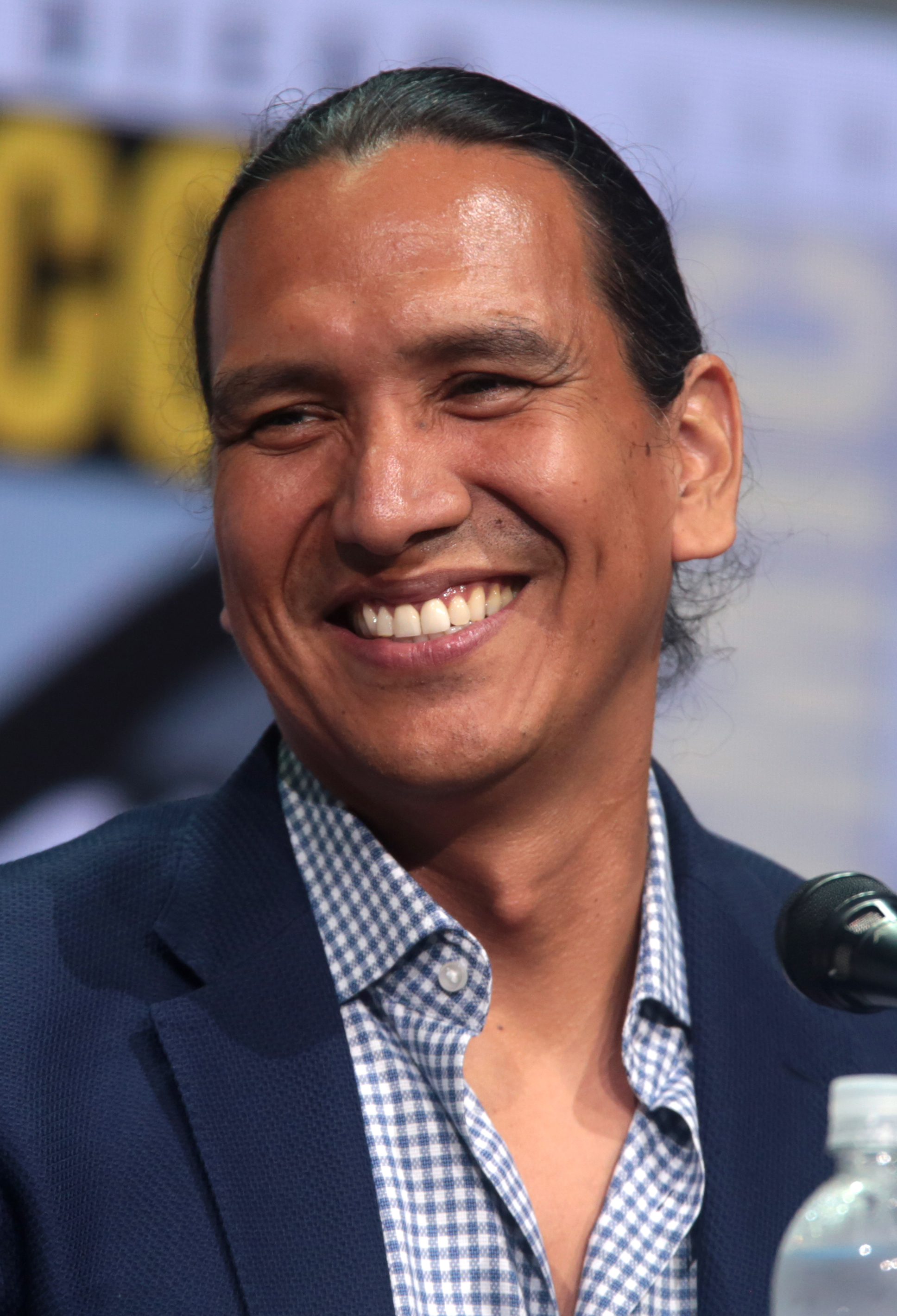
Dayton Callie (Jeremiah Otto), Rubén Blades (Daniel Salazar) and Michael Greyeyes (Qaletaqa Walker)

=== Main cast ===
The third season features twelve actors receiving main cast billing status, with seven returning from the first season; nine are listed as main cast members in the second season, while three new cast members are introduced. Rubén Blades returns after his disappearance in the previous season's mid-season finale. Danay García was promoted from recurring status and Dayton Callie was promoted from guest status, and Daniel Sharman, Sam Underwood, and Lisandra Tena were added to the main cast. This is the first season not to include Elizabeth Rodriguez, Michelle Ang and Lorenzo James Henrie who were all credited as main cast members (Rodriguez in season 1, Ang in season 2, and Henrie in both seasons) in previous season.

- Kim Dickens as Madison Clark: A cunning and domineering high school guidance counselor, the mother of Nick and Alicia, and Travis' fiancée.
- Cliff Curtis as Travis Manawa: A resolute and peacekeeping high school teacher and Madison's fiancé who is struggling to cope with the death of his son Chris.
- Frank Dillane as Nick Clark: A brave recovering heroin addict, Madison's son, and Alicia's brother.
- Alycia Debnam-Carey as Alicia Clark: The fiery yet compassionate daughter of Madison, and sister of Nick.
- Colman Domingo as Victor Strand: A smart and sophisticated conman-turned-businessman, who forms friendships with the Clark family.
- Mercedes Mason as Ofelia Salazar: The strong-willed and capable daughter of Daniel.
- Danay García as Luciana Galvez: A strong and cautious former member of the La Colonia community in Tijuana, Mexico, and Nick's girlfriend.
- Daniel Sharman as Troy Otto: The charismatic and impulsive son of Jeremiah, and Jake's half-brother.
- Sam Underwood as Jake Otto: Jeremiah's moralistic and wiser son, Troy's half-brother, and Alicia's love interest.
- Dayton Callie as Jeremiah Otto: The leader of Broke Jaw Ranch, and Jake and Troy's father.
- Lisandra Tena as Lola Guerrero: The generous and empathic leader of a community stationed at a dam located in Tijuana, who is responsible for supplying water.
- Rubén Blades as Daniel Salazar: A courageous and pragmatic former member of the Sombra Negra gang, a barber, and Ofelia's father.

=== Supporting cast ===
- Michael William Freeman as Blake Sarno: A member of the militia.
- Rae Gray as Gretchen Trimbol: A resident of Broke Jaw Ranch who becomes friends with Alicia.
- Matt Lasky as Cooper: A member of the militia.
- Sarah Benoit as Pat Daley: An outspoken resident of the Broke Jaw Ranch and Charlene's mother.
- Jesse Borrego as Efrain Morales: A man who saves Daniel after he is injured in a fire.
- Michael Greyeyes as Qaletaqa Walker: A Native American in a war with Jeremiah Otto, who he claims occupies his lands.
- Justin Rain as Lee "Crazy Dog": The right-hand man of Qaletaqa.
- Kalani Queypo as Klah Jackson: An arrogant member of the Native Americans.

=== Guest ===
- Noel Fisher as Willy: A sadistic member of the militia who executes survivors to learn more about the infection.
- Lindsay Pulsipher as Charlene Daley: A helicopter pilot for the Broke Jaw Ranch.
- Ross McCall as Steven: A survivor who aids Nick and Luciana to escape the militia.
- Brenda Strong as Ilene Stowe: A reclusive survivor in the Rosario Beach hotel who lost her sanity after her family's death.
- Karen Bethzabe as Elena Reyes: The Rosario Beach hotel manager.
- Ramses Jimenez as Hector Reyes: Elena's nephew.
- Jason Manuel Olazabal as Dante Esquivel: The leader of Gonzalez Dam.
- Hugo Armstrong as Vernon Trimbol: Gretchen's father and one of the founders of the Broke Jaw Ranch.
- Linda Gehringer as Christine: A resident of Broke Jaw Ranch who forms a bond with Alicia.
- Edwina Findley as Diana: A pragmatic survivor who becomes friends with Alicia.
- Miguel Pérez as "El Matarife": A drug dealer in El Bazar.
- James LeGros as Eddie: A doctor at El Bazar who works for Proctor John.
- Ray McKinnon as Proctor John: The leader of a gang known as the Proctors.

== Episodes ==
No. overall	No. in season	Title	Directed by	Written by	Original release date	U.S. viewers (millions)
22	1	"Eye of the Beholder"	Andrew Bernstein	Dave Erickson	June 4, 2017	3.11
Travis, Madison and Alicia are captured by an armed group and taken to a military compound, where Travis is separated from them and is taken to a basement while Madison and Alicia are taken to an office. At the basement, Travis finds himself with Nick, an injured Luciana and other captives. The captives are shot to see how long it takes for them to turn. Travis, Luciana, and Nick attempt to escape, Travis and Luciana descending into a sewer but Travis is re-captured and made to fight the dead in a pit. Meanwhile, Madison and Alicia attack Troy, impaling one of his eyes with a spoon and taking him hostage. Madison demands her family be released. Nick finds a horde of walkers at the end of the sewer and makes his way back. The family is reunited but the compound is overrun with walkers, forcing everyone to leave. Travis, Luciana and Alicia escape aboard a helicopter while Madison and Nick leave in a truck with Troy.
23	2	"The New Frontier"	Stefan Schwartz	Mark Richard	June 4, 2017	2.70
The helicopter is attacked and Travis is shot and bleeding out; he falls to his death rather than dying and turning as it crash lands. At the hotel, Strand allows many angry refugees inside the gates, falsely claiming he is a doctor to calm them. Madison, Troy, and Nick reach Broke Jaw Ranch, owned by Troy's father Jeremiah, and are informed that the helicopter has not arrived. Jeremiah welcomes Madison and Nick, who are suspicious but decide to stay. Back at the hotel, Elena orders Strand to leave before his lie enrages the survivors. After the helicopter crash, Alicia and Jake carry Luciana to the ranch, where they reunite with Madison and Nick. Madison breaks down after being informed of the death of Travis, while Nick forces the others to aid Luciana. Prior to leaping to her death from a hotel balcony, IIene gifts Strand the keys to a brand new Jaguar.
24	3	"TEOTWAWKI"	Deborah Chow	Ryan Scott	June 11, 2017	2.50
In a pre-apocalypse television commercial, Jeremiah Otto and his family promote a video series on the key to surviving TEOTWAWKI (the end of the world as we know it). The ranch holds a meeting in the wake of the helicopter pilot's death, where Troy, Jake, and Jeremiah vow justice. Other residents express contempt for Madison and her family. A recovering Luciana informs Nick that they must leave the ranch as soon as possible. Back in her cabin, Madison discovers Troy laying in Nick's bed, and he expresses contempt for her son; Madison tells Troy that Nick will learn to fit in. While boar hunting, Nick discovers he and Troy have similar worldviews. The team investigating the helicopter shooting are overdue; Troy is to lead a second team and Madison volunteers to accompany them. Elsewhere, Strand arrives at the Gonzalez Dam, where he is reunited with old friend Dante Esquevil, offering him a partnership in controlling the dam's dwindling water supplies, but Dante instead has Strand imprisoned; while in his cell, Strand is reunited with Daniel.
25	4	"100"	Alex García López	Alan Page	June 18, 2017	2.40
Through flashbacks, Daniel had survived the fire and escaped into Tijuana, where he was saved from death by a band of refugees headed by Efrain Morales, who consoles Daniel's grief for losing Ofelia. While fending off Walkers, Daniel falls into the sewers leading to the Gonzalez Dam, where he is spared death by Lola Guerrero, one of Dante's workers. Daniel's military expertise has him made one of Dante's operatives, and he betrays Efrain and later tortures him – but Lola exposes her complicity in water thefts to stop it. Strand is also awaiting execution, and offers to take Daniel to Ofelia at the hotel. Although Daniel helps execute one of Lola's workers, rather than kill Lola he kills Dante and his bodyguards, handing the dam over to Lola. (The title is the number of people Daniel has killed by the end of the episode.)
26	5	"Burning in Water, Drowning in Flame"	Daniel Stamm	Suzanne Heathcote	June 25, 2017	2.50
After a fire kills one of the founders of Broke Jaw, Nick and Jeremiah bond by cleaning up the wreck, locating Jeremiah's prized antique revolver. Nick hopes Luciana will like the house but she leaves in the night. Madison, Troy and their squad set out for the Black Hat Reserve, led by Qaletaqa Walker, on whose ancestral land Broke Jaw was built. Walker ambushes the squad who are forced to return in sock feet with a warning of an impending invasion. During the trek back, Troy contemplates killing Madison. Alicia and Jake begin a relationship. Elsewhere, Strand leads Daniel to the hotel, but upon finding Ofelia was not present, Daniel abandons Strand to the dead.
27	6	"Red Dirt"	Courtney Hunt	Wes Brown	July 2, 2017	2.19
Troy's patrol return with news of Walker's ultimatum; that night bonfires ring Broke Jaw, unnerving the sheltered people. Gretchen's family leaves despite Troy's threatening efforts to keep them for security measures. Madison sides with Troy and urges Jeremiah to keep his community together. Jake journeys to Black Hat to negotiate peace terms with Walker. Madison, Nick and Jeremiah later find Gretchen and her family murdered and turned; they all realize Troy was responsible but Madison informs the community that Walker did it to prepare them for the upcoming conflict. Alicia buys their story and runs after Jake to warn him.
28	7	"The Unveiling"	Jeremy Webb	Mark Richard	July 9, 2017	2.62
Jake and Alicia arrive at Black Hat, where Alicia discovers Ofelia to be alive and allied with Walker's tribe. Jake and Walker agree to a parley with an exchange of hostages to guarantee the truce; Alicia remains at Black Hat while Jake returns to Broke Jaw with Ofelia. While at Black Hat, Alicia learns that Walker's people have a water shortage and a prophecy of the apocalypse, seeing it as a sign to reclaim their former lands. Madison blackmails Troy to lead a team to rescue Alicia from Black Hat, breaking the truce and killing several of Walker's men. Jake attempts to mend ways by delivering Ofelia and a truckload of water, but he is beaten and nearly scalped. Later, Ofelia arrives at Broke Jaw, seemingly cast out. A crippling illness suddenly strikes the community and many of the militia die and reanimate as walkers, massacring the residents; Nick sees Ofelia running and realizes she was responsible before he also falls sick.
29	8	"Children of Wrath"	Andrew Bernstein	Jami O'Brien	July 9, 2017	2.40
Through flashbacks, Ofelia crossed the border and was denied help from Jeremiah but taken in by Walker. Madison beats Ofelia and takes her to Black Hat where Walker reveals the poison was anthrax. Ofelia later confronts Walker over making her a killer. The militia attack Black Hat and, at the cost of lives on both sides, Madison and Alicia steal Walker's trailer of spiritual relics. Nick digs under the old cabin and learns Jeremiah and the founders killed three braves who were attacking their cattle, plus Walker's father. Madison offers the reliquary and Walker's father's remains but Walker refuses peace. Alicia is incensed at Troy's crimes and Madison reveals that she'd killed her abusive father to protect her mother. Madison urges Jeremiah to kill himself, saying this will appease Walker and preserve Jeremiah's legacy; Nick kills him instead and they stage it as a suicide. Madison secretly delivers Jeremiah's head to Walker. Meanwhile, Strand finds the Abigail run aground; he speaks on the radio with an alleged Russian cosmonaut who tells him his life is not over then sets fire to the Abigail and leaves with a pack of weapons and supplies.
30	9	"Minotaur"	Stefan Schwartz	Dave Erickson & Mike Zunic	September 10, 2017	2.14
Walker's group move onto the ranch; the new community share a meal after which Jake and Walker speak of building a peace together. However, tensions remain and a drunk youth tries to avenge Gretchen; although the young man is killed Walker is given control of the armory and raids every rancher for their weapons. When Troy refuses, Walker sends in an armed assault. Troy is injured protecting Nick who admits to killing Jeremiah, getting Troy to stand down. Walker demands justice so exiles Troy while Nick is put in a hotbox. Troy overpowers the native sent with him and confronts Madison over Jeremiah's death. At the dam, Daniel tells Lola that she's the new boss, to be loved or despised. While distributing water the crowd turns on her and she is attacked.
31	10	"The Diviner"	Paco Cabezas	Ryan Scott	September 10, 2017	2.14
Madison informs Walker that the ranch's aquifer is running dry, and they take a tanker to a bazaar in Mexicali to negotiate for water. They find Strand who owes debts to the authorities. Madison uses Walker's gold to buy his freedom. At the ranch, the natives are overseeing the water distribution, leading to tensions. The militia see Nick as Troy's successor and he cautions them to bide their time. Alicia tries to head-off water disputes but ends up starting a riot by revealing that they have only six weeks of water. The natives try to take possession of the main well but Nick, armed with the ranchers' last pistol, leads a sit-in. There is a run for water, draining the aquifer. The militia move on the native guards but at the last moment are inspired by efforts to tap a new well.
32	11	"La Serpiente"	Josef Wladyka	Mark Richard & Lauren Signorino	September 17, 2017	1.99
Madison, Strand and Walker drive the tanker to Mexico, then crawl through tunnels to the dam. Madison tells Daniel that Ofelia is alive at the ranch but they need water. Lola refuses a trade, but invites Madison to bring her family and work for her. Daniel thinks it better that Ofelia not know he's alive, though he is displeased to learn that Walker turned her into a murderer. Daniel and Efrain propose different courses to Lola. Walker leaves on foot, intending to force the ranchers out. Daniel fears the dissatisfied people will rise against Lola, and sanctions Strand to act if their interests align. A water truck explodes, punching a hole in the gate, and a slogan-chanting mob soon appear. Lola is convinced to trade 10,000 gallons of water per week for weapons, with the first exchange at the bazaar in 5 days. Lola wants Ofelia to be there. Strand and Madison drive back, picking up Walker on the road.
33	12	"Brother's Keeper"	Alrick Riley	Wes Brown	September 24, 2017	2.08
Troy lives off the land while continuing to write in his journal. He revisits the scene of the helicopter crash, finds a grenade launcher and buries the rancher Walker had disfigured. Troy visits Nick in the night and warns him that the ranch will be destroyed. Jake asks Alicia to leave with him and questions their relationship when she refuses. Nick and Jake set out to find Troy and discover him using the grenade launcher to guide a herd of walking dead toward the ranch. Troy explains that the herd will force the people into the desert, as he was, and only the fittest will survive. Jake holds Troy at gunpoint but hesitates on learning that Nick killed their father and Alicia kept it secret. Jake is bitten and dies following an amputation, and Troy mourns his brother, saying he brought the herd to regain their legacy. A wall of trailers and RVs is hoped to turn the herd but it fails and the ranchers and natives evacuate to the bunker-like pantry.
34	13	"This Land Is Your Land"	Meera Menon	Suzanne Heathcote	October 1, 2017	2.36
The pantry Alicia evacuated everyone into doesn't have enough air for them all; she asks for those bitten to come forward. A dozen people are given morphine and euthanized. Distraught as their executioner, Alicia bonds with 9-11 widow Christine. People begin passing out and rising as the dead; Alicia kills one in a fall before passing out. While crawling through a convoluted vent system Crazy Dog panics and hyperventilates until he is calmed by Ofelia. Later, Crazy Dog collapses while Ofelia is clearing a zombie from a fan, and she barely survives. Nick and Troy drive through the herd and become trapped in the helicopter. Madison, Strand and Walker return to find the horde has overrun the ranch, and ignite the ranch's fuel depot to rescue Nick, Troy, and the only survivor of the pantry, Alicia. They prepare to return to the dam but Alicia refuses to go, wanting to go alone to Jake's cabin and find her own way to live in the world.
35	14	"El Matadero"	Stefan Schwartz	Alan Page	October 8, 2017	2.23
Ofelia falls off the water truck and the others see she has been bitten. Madison promises that she'll see her father, sells half their weapons so she can rest in the bazaar and spends more to keep her comfortable. Strand criticizes her for wasting resources while grieving Walker finds honor in observing her last wish. Ofelia dies just as Daniel arrives. Nick goes on a binge of drugs and drinking, wrangling Troy into joining him, eventually wading through a group of walking dead when Nick confesses that he can't go with Madison. The next morning, Daniel agrees to let Madison's group come to the dam but Nick and Troy decide to stay at the bazaar. Elsewhere, Alicia's scavenging attracts the dead who are killed by Diana. The two women initially threaten each other but decide to share the food Alicia found.
36	15	"Things Bad Begun"	Andrew Bernstein	Jami O'Brien	October 15, 2017	2.23
Alicia brings Diana to the bazaar for treatment and is enlisted to assist a life-saving surgery. The patient is John, the President of the Proctors, an outlaw motorcycle gang which is opening a trade route from the Texas gulf coast to San Diego. Meanwhile, Troy learns that the Proctors intend to attack the dam and rushes with Nick to warn them. It is decided to hold out but if defeat is certain to blow the dam with explosives to prevent the Proctors from having a water monopoly. Walker and Crazy Dog leave to search for survivors from their nation. Strand tells Nick to get his family out, having made a deal with the Proctors but no longer being able to guarantee anyone's safety. Nick is then questioned by Daniel about the herd, giving Nick another reason to get them out. However, when Madison learns that Troy led the herd she seemingly kills him in front of Nick. Strand opens a gate for the Proctors and in a struggle shoots Daniel in the face. As the Proctors overrun the dam, Strand takes the detonator and hides Madison and Nick.
37	16	"Sleigh Ride"	Andrew Bernstein	Dave Erickson & Mark Richard	October 15, 2017	2.23
Hiding together, tensions rise between Nick and Madison over Troy's murder and her growing ruthlessness. Proctor John arrives at the dam with Alicia, displeased that Strand wasn't fully able to deliver on their deal, and Alicia bargains for Madison's safety. Strand is helping Madison and Nick escape when Lola attacks the Proctors and is killed. For the duplicity John decides to kill all four, starting with Alicia as a mercy. However, Nick uses the detonator in a standoff, threatening to blow up the dam. Madison, Alicia and Strand escape on a boat. The Proctors begin to move on Nick who receives unexpected help from Walker and Crazy Dog who snipe from a nearby hilltop, and Daniel who fights his way across the dam. Nick detonates the explosives, blowing a hole in the dam, and the boat is carried through by the current. Nick and Daniel escape while Madison swims to shore alone.

== Reception ==
=== Critical response ===
On Rotten Tomatoes, the season has a rating of 84%, based on 110 reviews, whose average rating is 7.25/10. The site's critical consensus is, "A distinctive ensemble brings a compelling flavor of Fear the Walking Dead mythos, but this ambitious spinoff still shares its originator's penchant longwinded pacing that may diminish the tension for some viewers."

Fear the Walking Dead season 3: Critical reception by episode
Season 3 (2017): Percentage of positive critics' reviews tracked by the website Rotten Tomatoes

=== Ratings ===
Viewership and ratings per episode of Fear the Walking Dead season 3
No.	Title	Air date	Rating (18–49)	Viewers (millions)	DVR (18–49)	DVR viewers (millions)	Total (18–49)	Total viewers (millions)
1	"Eye of the Beholder"	June 4, 2017	1.2	3.11	0.9	1.97	2.1	5.08
2	"The New Frontier"	June 4, 2017	1.0	2.70	1.0	1.93	2.0	4.63
3	"TEOTWAWKI"	June 11, 2017	1.0	2.50	0.8	1.72	1.8	4.22
4	"100"	June 18, 2017	0.9	2.40	0.8	1.67	1.7	4.07
5	"Burning in Water, Drowning in Flame"	June 25, 2017	1.0	2.50	0.8	1.68	1.8	4.18
6	"Red Dirt"	July 2, 2017	0.8	2.19	0.7	1.50	1.5	3.70 (Note: Live +7 ratings were not available, so Live +3 ratings have been used instead.)
7	"The Unveiling"	July 9, 2017	0.9	2.62	0.6	1.20	1.5	3.82
8	"Children of Wrath"	July 9, 2017	0.8	2.40	0.7	1.35	1.5	3.75
9	"Minotaur"	September 10, 2017	0.8	2.14	—N/a	—N/a	—N/a	—N/a
10	"The Diviner"	September 10, 2017	0.8	2.14	—N/a	—N/a	—N/a	—N/a
11	"La Serpiente"	September 17, 2017	0.7	1.99	0.6	1.35	1.3	3.34
12	"Brother's Keeper"	September 24, 2017	0.8	2.08	—N/a	—N/a	—N/a	—N/a
13	"This Land Is Your Land"	October 1, 2017	0.9	2.36	0.6	1.40	1.5	3.77
14	"El Matadero"	October 8, 2017	0.8	2.23	0.6	1.51	1.4	3.74
15	"Things Bad Begun"	October 15, 2017	0.8	2.23	0.7	1.60	1.5	3.83
16	"Sleigh Ride"	October 15, 2017	0.8	2.23	0.7	1.60	1.5	3.83

== Home media ==
The third season, featuring audio commentaries and deleted scenes, was released on Blu-ray and DVD on March 13, 2018.
