= El Matadero =

El Matadero may refer to:

- The Slaughter Yard (El matadero), a 1871 short story by Esteban Echeverría
- "El Matadero (Fear the Walking Dead)", an episode of the television series Fear the Walking Dead
- Matadero (English: Slaughterhouse), a 2019 Spanish black comedy–crime drama limited television series created by Daniel Martín Sáez de Parayuelo and produced by Diagonal TV for Atresmedia
- Matadero, a 2022 Argentine-Spanish-French thriller film based on the homonymous short story by Esteban Echeverría and directed by Santiago Fillol.
