= Burning in Water, Drowning in Flame (Fear the Walking Dead) =

- Fear the Walking Dead episode
- Episode no.: Season 3 Episode 5
- Directed by: Daniel Stamm
- Written by: Suzanne Heathcote
- Original air date: June 25, 2017
- Running time: 43 minutes

Guest appearances
- Michael Greyeyes as Qaletaqa Walker; Rae Gray as Gretchen Trimbol; Michael William Freeman as Blake Sarno; Justin Rain as Lee

Episode chronology
← Previous "100"	Next → "Red Dirt"
- Fear the Walking Dead (season 3)

"Burning in Water, Drowning in Flame" is the fifth episode of the third season of the post-apocalyptic horror television series Fear the Walking Dead, which aired on AMC on June 25, 2017.

This episode also marks the first appearance of Michael Greyeyes as Qaletaqa Walker, a prominent recurring character of the season.

== Plot ==
After a fire kills one of the founders of Broke Jaw, Nick and Jeremiah bond by cleaning up the wreck, locating Jeremiah's prized antique revolver. Nick hopes Luciana will like the house but she leaves in the night. Madison, Troy and their squad set out for the Black Hat Reserve, led by Qaletaqa Walker, on whose ancestral land Broke Jaw was built. Walker ambushes the squad who are forced to return in sock feet with a warning of an impending invasion. During the trek back, Troy contemplates killing Madison. Alicia and Jake begin a relationship. Elsewhere, Strand leads Daniel to the hotel, but upon finding Ofelia was not present, Daniel abandons Strand to the dead.

== Reception ==
"Burning in Water, Drowning in Flame", received very positive reviews from critics. On Rotten Tomatoes, "Burning in Water, Drowning in Flame" garnered an 86% rating, with an average score of 7.24/10 based on 7 reviews.

Matt Fowler of IGN gave "Burning in Water, Drowning in Flame" an 8.2/10.0 rating, stating; "Five episodes into its third season and Fear the Walking Dead feels more confident and capable. Everyone's journey, both as a collective and as individuals, feels legitimate and un-forced. Nick's desire to make Luciana feel at home, Alicia's resentment of the future she's lost, Madison's hard-nosed survival mode - it all works. And gone are the days when dangers would descend due to their bad decisions."

=== Ratings ===
"Burning in Water, Drowning in Flame" was seen by 2.50 million viewers in the United States on its original air date, above the previous episodes rating of 2.40 million.
