= Minotaur (Fear the Walking Dead) =

- Fear the Walking Dead episode
- Episode no.: Season 3 Episode 9
- Directed by: Stefan Schwartz
- Written by: Dave Erickson; Mike Zunic
- Original air date: September 10, 2017
- Running time: 43 minutes

Guest appearances
- Michael Greyeyes as Qaletaqa Walker; Jesse Borrego as Efraín Morales; Justin Rain as Lee; Michael William Freeman as Blake Sarno; Kalani Queypo as Klah Jackson

Episode chronology
← Previous "Children of Wrath"	Next → "The Diviner"
- Fear the Walking Dead (season 3)

"Minotaur" is the ninth episode and mid-season premiere of the third season of the post-apocalyptic horror television series Fear the Walking Dead, which aired on AMC on September 10, 2017 along with the following episode "The Diviner".

== Plot ==
Walker's group move onto the ranch; the new community share a meal after which Jake and Walker speak of building a peace together. However, tensions remain and a drunk youth tries to avenge Gretchen; although the young man is killed Walker is given control of the armory and raids every rancher for their weapons. When Troy refuses, Walker sends in an armed assault. Troy is injured protecting Nick who admits to killing Jeremiah, getting Troy to stand down. Walker demands justice so exiles Troy while Nick is put in a hotbox. Troy overpowers the native sent with him and confronts Madison over Jeremiah's death. At the dam, Daniel tells Lola that she is the new boss, to be loved or despised. While distributing water the crowd turns on her and she is attacked.

== Reception ==
"Minotaur", along with the mid-season premiere "The Diviner", received very positive reviews from critics. On Rotten Tomatoes, "Minotaur" garnered an 86% rating, with an average score of 7.25/10 based on 7 reviews.

In a joint review along with the following episode "The Diviner", Matt Fowler of IGN gave "Minotaur" an 8.4/10.0 rating, stating; "Things felt rushed and forced when it came to the spilling of secrets (and no real fallout followed) on Fear the Walking Dead's midseason premiere(s), but overall these were solid chapters with some great character-defining scenes"

=== Ratings ===
"Minotaur" was seen by 2.14 million viewers in the United States on its original air date, below the previous episodes rating of 2.40 million.
