= 100 (Fear the Walking Dead) =

- Fear the Walking Dead episode
- Episode no.: Season 3 Episode 4
- Directed by: Alex García López
- Written by: Alan Page
- Original air date: June 18, 2017
- Running time: 43 minutes

Guest appearances
- Jason Manuel Olazabal as Dante Esquivel; Jesse Borrego as Efraín Morales; Ricardo Chacon as J.C.

Episode chronology
← Previous "TEOTWAWKI"	Next → "Burning in Water, Drowning in Flame"
- Fear the Walking Dead (season 3)

"100" is the fourth episode of the third season of the post-apocalyptic horror television series Fear the Walking Dead, which aired on AMC on June 18, 2017.

The title is the number of people Daniel has killed by the end of the episode.

This episode marks Lisandra Tena's first appearance as Lola Guerrero who plays a prominent role this season, this episode is also the first to be spoken mainly in Spanish.

== Plot ==
Through flashbacks, Daniel had survived the fire and escaped into Tijuana, where he was saved from death by a band of refugees headed by Efrain Morales, who consoles Daniel's grief for losing Ofelia. While fending off Walkers, Daniel falls into the sewers leading to the Gonzalez Dam, where he is spared death by Lola Guerrero, one of Dante's workers. Daniel's military expertise has him made one of Dante's operatives, and he betrays Efrain and later tortures him – but Lola exposes her complicity in water thefts to stop it. Strand is also awaiting execution, and offers to take Daniel to Ofelia at the hotel. Although Daniel helps execute one of Lola's workers, rather than kill Lola he kills Dante and his bodyguards, handing the dam over to Lola.

== Reception ==
"100", received positive reviews from critics. On Rotten Tomatoes, "100" garnered a 75% rating, with an average score of 7.5/10 based on 8 reviews.

Matt Fowler of IGN gave "100" a 9/10 rating, stating; ""100" felt fresh and immediate and for the first time, even though it only focused in on one main character, Fear the Walking Dead felt wholly like its own unique endeavor. The same universe as the original series, sure, but with vitally different perspectives, angles, and objectives. It kind of answered that recurring question "Why have another Walking Dead show?" as Daniel was constantly saved while also constantly being placed in situations where he was called upon to do harm to innocent people. People who he even owned a great debt to. It was stunning and Ruben Blades was mesmerizing."

=== Ratings ===
"100" was seen by 2.40 million viewers in the United States on its original air date, below the previous episodes rating of 2.50 million.
