= This Land Is Your Land (Fear the Walking Dead) =

- Fear the Walking Dead episode
- Episode no.: Season 3 Episode 13
- Directed by: Meera Menon
- Written by: Suzanne Heathcote
- Original air date: October 1, 2017
- Running time: 43 minutes

Guest appearances
- Michael Greyeyes as Qaletaqa Walker; Linda Gehringer as Christine; Michael William Freeman as Blake Sarno; Justin Rain as Lee

Episode chronology
← Previous "Brother's Keeper"	Next → "El Matadero"
- Fear the Walking Dead (season 3)

"This Land Is Your Land" is the thirteenth episode of the third season of the post-apocalyptic horror television series Fear the Walking Dead, which aired on AMC on October 1, 2017. The episode received positive reviews from critics. It marks the final regular appearance of Sam Underwood (Jake Otto), who died in the previous episode.

== Plot ==
The pantry into which Alicia evacuated everyone doesn't have enough air for them all; she asks for those bitten to come forward. A dozen people are given morphine and euthanized. Distraught as their executioner, Alicia bonds with 9/11 widow Christine. People begin passing out and rising as the dead; Alicia kills one in a fall before passing out. While crawling through a convoluted vent system, Crazy Dog panics and hyperventilates until he is calmed by Ofelia. Later, Crazy Dog collapses while Ofelia is clearing a zombie from a fan, and she barely survives. Nick and Troy drive through the herd and become trapped in the helicopter. Ofelia and Crazy Dog ignite the ranch's fuel depot. Madison, Strand and Walker return and rescue Nick, Troy and Alicia, the only survivor of the pantry. They prepare to return to the dam but Alicia refuses to go, wanting to go alone to Jake's cabin and find her own way to live in the world.

== Reception ==
"This Land Is Your Land" received critical acclaim. David Zapanta of Den of Geek rated it 4.5/5, crediting the writing, directing, and Debnam-Carey's portrayal of Alicia Clark for a "transformative" episode that "gives The Walking Dead a serious run for its money". Digital Spy's Ben Lee called it a "breathtaking and action-packed episode". Paul Tassi of Forbes wrote, "The entire sequence with Alicia in the bunker is one of the best pieces of zombie fiction I've seen in years", praising "This Land Is Your Land" as an example of what separates the series from The Walking Dead. IGN's Matt Fowler noted that while it "wasn't an all-Alicia episode" it "still had an amazing, harrowing Alicia-centric story inside of it - one that really helped shape her character".

=== Ratings ===
"This Land Is Your Land" was seen by 2.38 million viewers in the United States on its original air date, above the previous episodes rating of 2.08 million.
