= The Diviner =

- Fear the Walking Dead episode
- Episode no.: Season 3 Episode 10
- Directed by: Paco Cabezas
- Written by: Ryan Scott
- Original air date: September 10, 2017
- Running time: 43 minutes

Guest appearances
- Michael Greyeyes as Qaletaqa Walker; Justin Rain as Lee; Michael William Freeman as Blake Sarno; Kalani Queypo as Klah Jackson

Episode chronology
← Previous "Minotaur"	Next → "La Serpiente"
- Fear the Walking Dead (season 3)

"The Diviner" is the tenth episode of the third season of the post-apocalyptic horror television series Fear the Walking Dead, which aired on AMC on September 10, 2017, along with the mid-season premiere episode "Minotaur".

== Plot ==
Madison informs Walker that the ranch's aquifer is running dry, and they take a tanker to a bazaar in Mexicali to negotiate for water. They find Strand who owes debts to the authorities. Madison uses Walker's gold to buy his freedom. At the ranch, the natives are overseeing the water distribution, leading to tensions. The militia see Nick as Troy's successor and he cautions them to bide their time. Alicia tries to head-off water disputes but ends up starting a riot by revealing that they have only six weeks of water. The natives try to take possession of the main well but Nick, armed with the ranchers' last pistol, leads a sit-in. There is a run for water, draining the aquifer. The militia move on the native guards but at the last moment are inspired by efforts to tap a new well.

== Reception ==
"The Diviner", along with the mid-season premiere "Minotaur", received very positive reviews from critics. On Rotten Tomatoes, "The Diviner" garnered an 86% rating, with an average score of 7.25/10 based on 7 reviews.

In a joint review along with the mid-season premiere episode "Minotaur", Matt Fowler of IGN gave "The Diviner" an 8.4/10.0 rating, stating; "Things felt rushed and forced when it came to the spilling of secrets (and no real fallout followed) on Fear the Walking Dead's midseason premiere(s), but overall these were solid chapters with some great character-defining scenes"

Conversely, David S.E Zapanta of Den of Geek gave "The Diviner" a more negative review, with a 2.5/5 rating, stating; "We have six episodes left, so there's still time for AMC to turn things around. Until then, I'm rooting for the zombies. And maybe Alicia. But mostly the undead."

=== Ratings ===
"The Diviner" was seen by 2.14 million viewers in the United States on its original air date, the same as the previous episodes rating of 2.14 million.
