= Brother's Keeper (Fear the Walking Dead) =

- Fear the Walking Dead episode
- Episode no.: Season 3 Episode 12
- Directed by: Alrick Riley
- Written by: Wes Brown
- Original air date: September 24, 2017
- Running time: 41 minutes

Guest appearances
- Michael William Freeman as Blake Sarno; Justin Rain as Crazy Dog; Kalani Queypo as Klah Jackson; Linda Gehringer as Christine

Episode chronology
| ← Previous "La Serpiente" | Next → "This Land Is Your Land" |
- Fear the Walking Dead (season 3)

"Brother's Keeper" is the twelfth episode of the third season of the post-apocalyptic horror television series Fear the Walking Dead, which aired on AMC on September 24, 2017.

== Plot ==
Troy lives off the land while continuing to write in his journal. He revisits the scene of the helicopter crash, finds a grenade launcher and buries the rancher Walker had disfigured. Troy visits Nick in the night and warns him that the ranch will be destroyed. Jake asks Alicia to leave with him and questions their relationship when she refuses. Nick and Jake set out to find Troy and discover him using the grenade launcher to guide a herd of walking dead toward the ranch. Troy explains that the herd will force the people into the desert, as he was, and only the fittest will survive. Jake holds Troy at gunpoint but hesitates on learning that Nick killed their father and Alicia kept it secret. Jake is bitten and dies following an amputation, and Troy mourns his brother, saying he brought the herd to regain their legacy. A wall of trailers and RVs is hoped to turn the herd, but it fails and the ranchers and natives evacuate to the bunker-like pantry.

== Reception ==
On Rotten Tomatoes, "Brother's Keeper" garnered a 100% approval rating, with an average score of 8.00/10 based on 6 reviews. David Zapanta of Den of Geek rated it 4/5, stating, "if [the] season were a Choose Your Own Adventure book, every plot choice would hinge on the Clark family making a bad situation worse", and deeming Alicia Clark one of the "more fully realized characters" of the season. Steve Ford of TV Fanatic gave it a 3/5, writing that it "could have been so much more than it was" as it retreaded what The Walking Dead did in a prior season, although Fear "handled it better" and "the story progression felt much more natural". Nick Romano of Entertainment Weekly wrote, "For an hour, the narrative and character flaws of episodes past seemed like a distant memory", praising the show's "ability to build tension from the opening sequence to the finish".

=== Ratings ===
"Brother's Keeper" was seen by 2.08 million viewers in the United States on its original air date, above the previous episodes rating of 1.99 million.
