= What's Your Story? =

- Fear the Walking Dead episode
- Episode no.: Season 4 Episode 1
- Directed by: John Polson
- Written by: Scott M. Gimple; Andrew Chambliss; Ian Goldberg
- Original air date: April 15, 2018
- Running time: 49 minutes

Guest appearances
- Andrew Lincoln as Rick Grimes; Melissa McBride as Carol Peletier; Tom Payne as Paul "Jesus" Rovia; Clint James as Leland

Episode chronology
← Previous "Sleigh Ride"	Next → "Another Day in the Diamond"
- Fear the Walking Dead (season 4)

"What's Your Story?" is the first episode of the fourth season of the post-apocalyptic horror television series Fear the Walking Dead, which aired on AMC on April 15, 2018.

The episode marks the first appearance of Lennie James (Morgan Jones), after his departure from The Walking Dead's eighth season, making it the first crossover between the two shows. New cast members Garret Dillahunt (John Dorie) and Maggie Grace (Althea) are introduced in the episode, and Danay Garcia (Luciana Galvez) returns. "What's Your Story?" marks the first and only appearance of Rick Grimes, Carol Peletier and Paul "Jesus" Rovia, characters from The Walking Dead.

== Plot ==
In cold open, a lone man, John Dorie, reads a book until he hears a twig break. He asks if anyone's there and no one answers. As he goes back to reading his book, he hears a walker and immediately shoots it down, revealing Morgan Jones, who was about to kill it. John asks Morgan, "So, what's your story?"

Shortly after the war with the Saviors, Morgan Jones decides to isolate himself from everyone else but after many attempts by Paul "Jesus" Rovia, Carol Peletier and Rick Grimes to persuade him to stay, Morgan leaves his community in Virginia. Morgan hesitates but ultimately decides to run away, making his way to the Texas border, where he sees an injured man shivering in a car. Morgan leaves water and a towel but the injured man refuses, telling Morgan that in this world they're always on their own. Morgan takes back the items and keeps walking.

Later that night, Morgan meets John Dorie, who offers him shelter for the night. With some reluctance, Morgan agrees to sleep the night in John's truck but later on he leaves and is captured by Leland and a small group of survivors. John comes to save Morgan but is captured; they are saved by a woman named Althea, who drives a SWAT vehicle. Althea tells Morgan and John that she is a journalist and wants to get their stories on camera.

The following morning, John tells Althea that he is on a mission to find his girlfriend, Laura. When Althea asks for Morgan's story, he refuses and decides to leave by himself. John catches him up to give him new pairs of socks but they realize they're being ambushed. They are then held at gunpoint by Leland and his men (along with Althea). Morgan uses his spear to attack, giving John time to shoot back. A quick gunfight ensues and Morgan is shot in the leg by one of Leland's men. After a brief fight, they fall and the man starts getting devoured by walkers until Morgan grabs a grenade from a walker and throws it at the walkers. He runs to the bathroom for cover as the explosion kills the walkers and the man.

Outside, John is dealing with the walkers, while Althea and Leland are fighting over the keys to the SWAT vehicle. Althea throws a set of keys and Leland, believing they're the keys to the SWAT vehicle, goes after them and is bitten by a rattlesnake. He is eventually surrounded and set upon by the walker herd. Althea uses machine guns in the SWAT vehicle to shoot the walkers as Morgan and John duck for cover.

After the fusillade ends, Althea, John and Morgan continue on the road until Morgan asks to pull over. Morgan then tells his story from Atlanta, Virginia and the communities, the king and a tiger, the war with the Saviors, until he left the settlement. Morgan decides to stop, but Althea continues asking what he's trying to get away from. Morgan decides to leave despite John's protest due to Morgan's injured leg. Althea asks Morgan to tell her one real thing. He replies, "I lose people and then I lose myself" and walks away.

Morgan continues walking until he sees the car from earlier in the episode. He sees a walker in the distance and follows it but two walkers notice him. Morgan tries limping away but falls and drops his stick. John comes to save him and tells Morgan that he's wrong about being on his own. Morgan continues toward the walker ahead, whom he realizes is the injured man from the car. Out of mercy, Morgan buries him and agrees to tag along with Althea and John until his leg heals.

Along the way, the group stops their vehicle when they see a woman crawling on the ground, who turns out to be Alicia Clark. Morgan, John and Althea are then surrounded at gunpoint by Nick Clark, Victor Strand and Luciana Galvez. Althea asks Alicia, "So what the hell is your story?", as the episode ends.

== Production ==
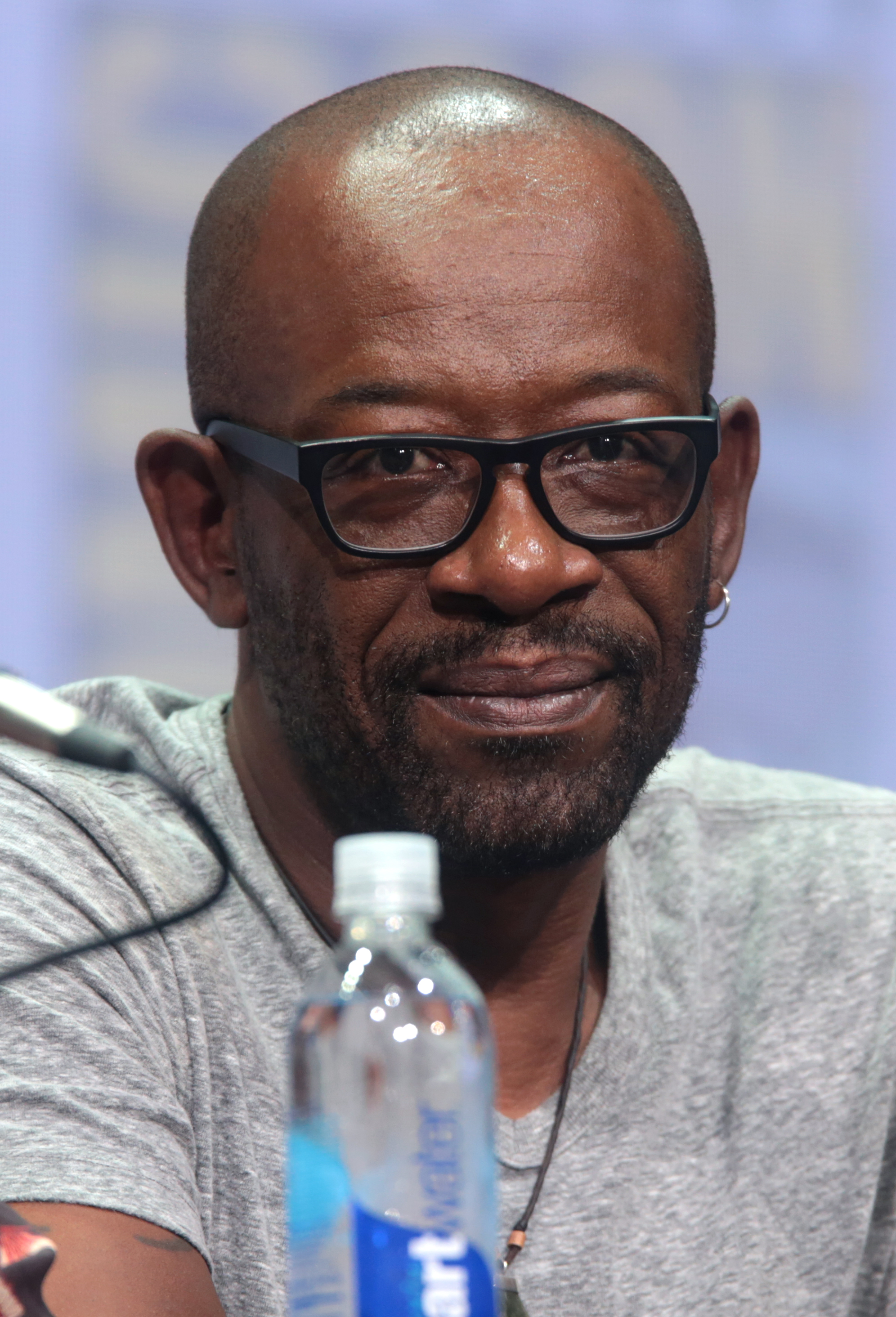
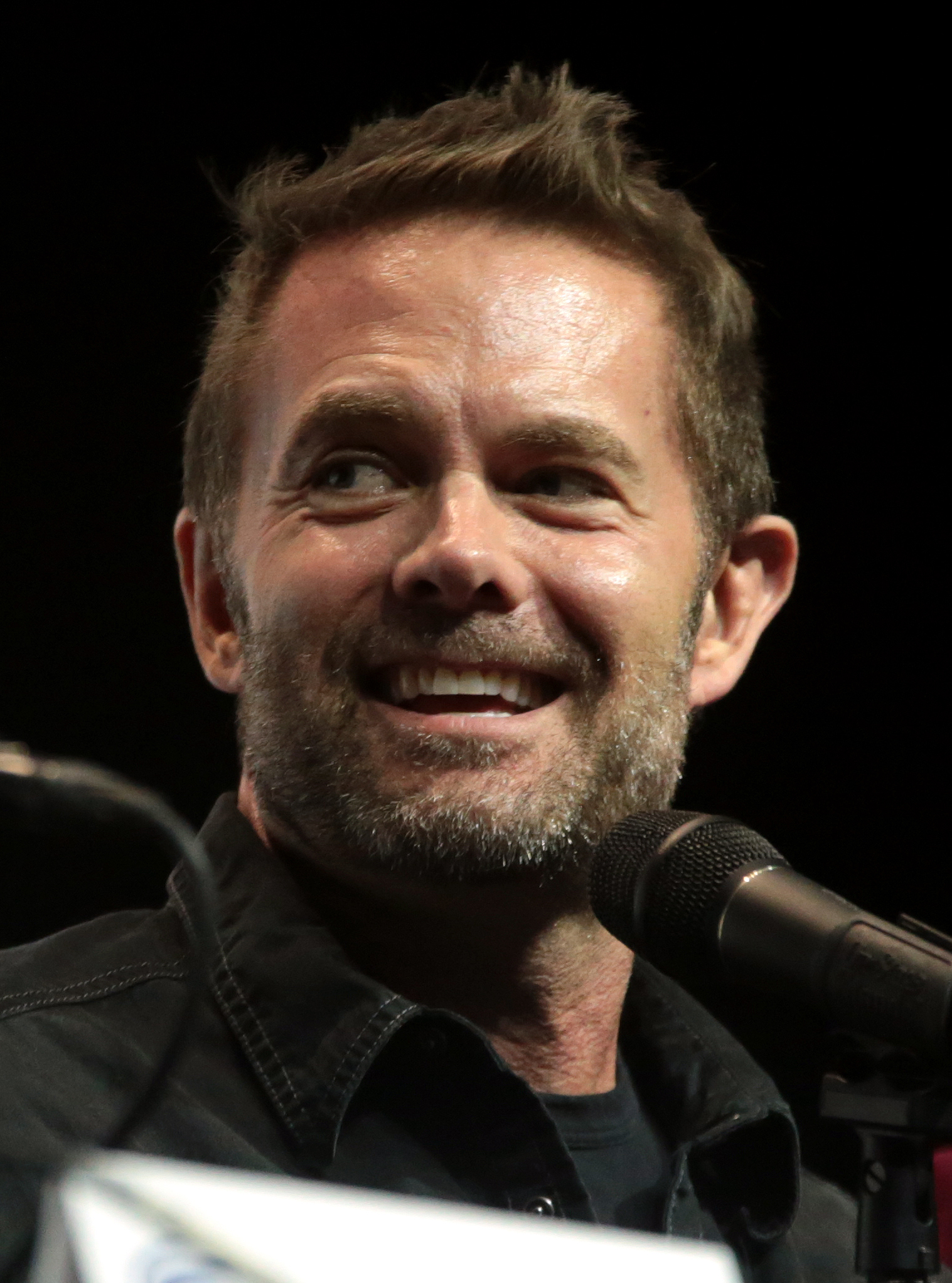
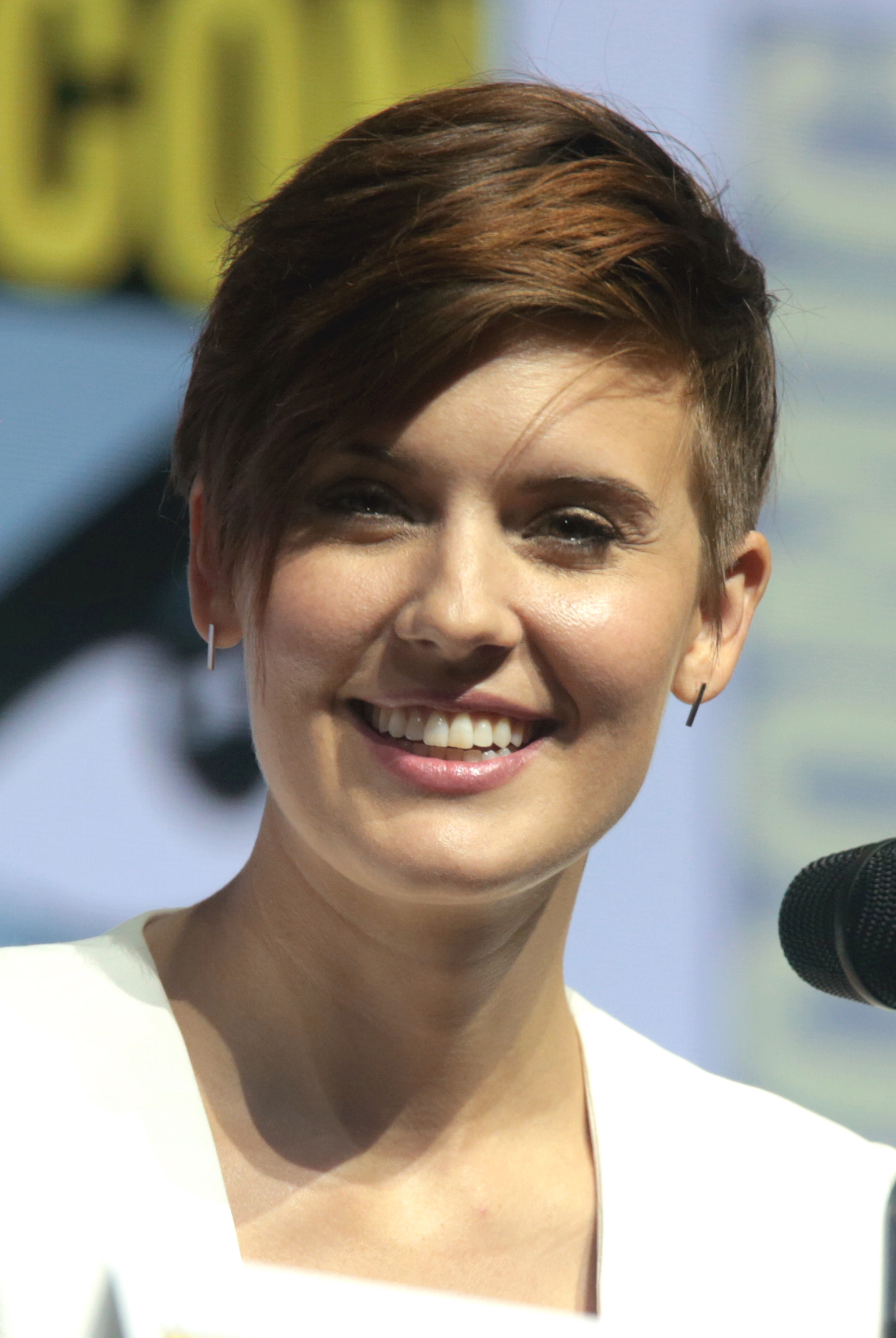
Lennie James (Morgan Jones) made his first appearance on Fear the Walking Dead after his departure from The Walking Dead. Garret Dillahunt (John Dorie) and Maggie Grace (Althea) also made their debut in "What's Your Story?".
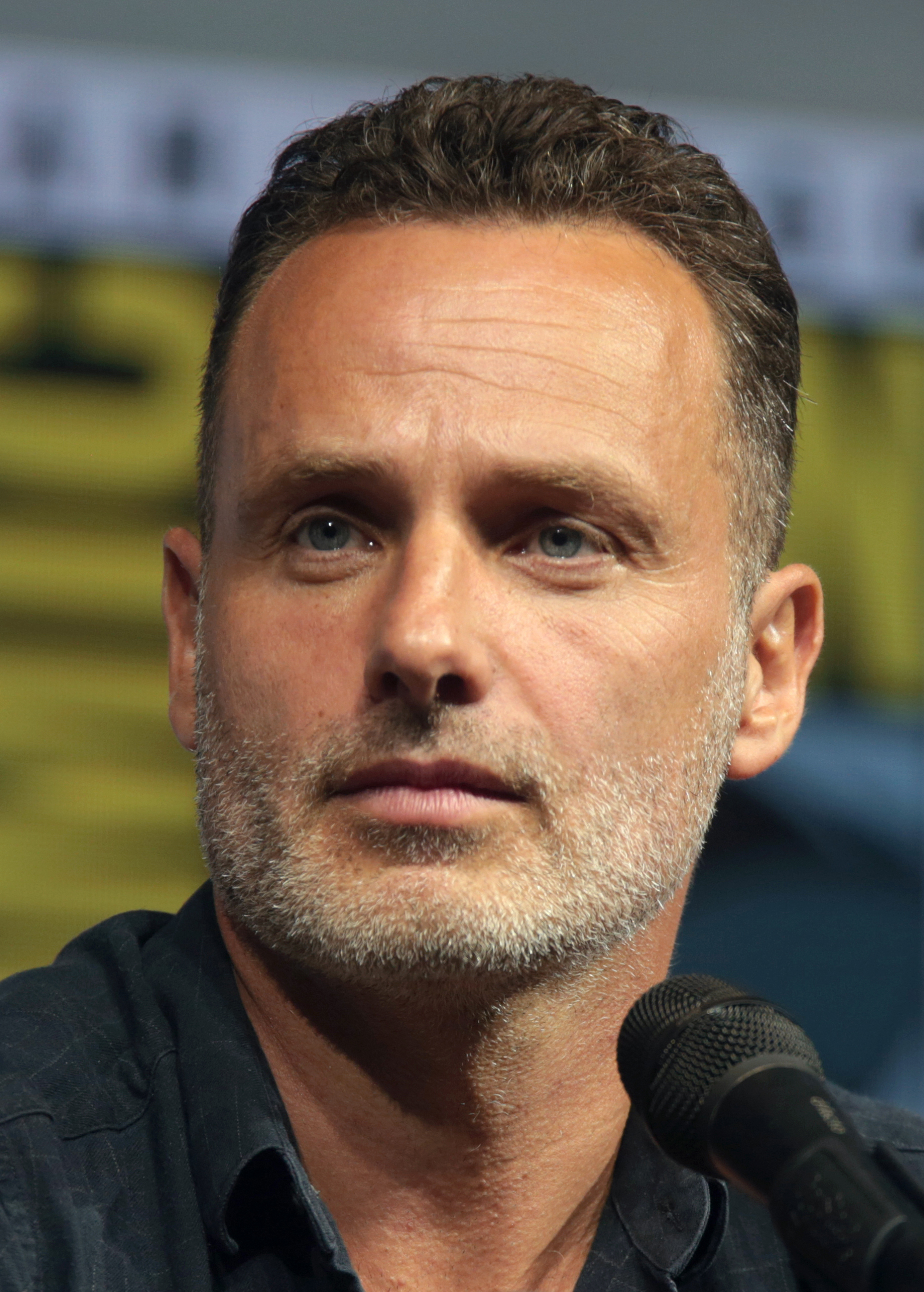
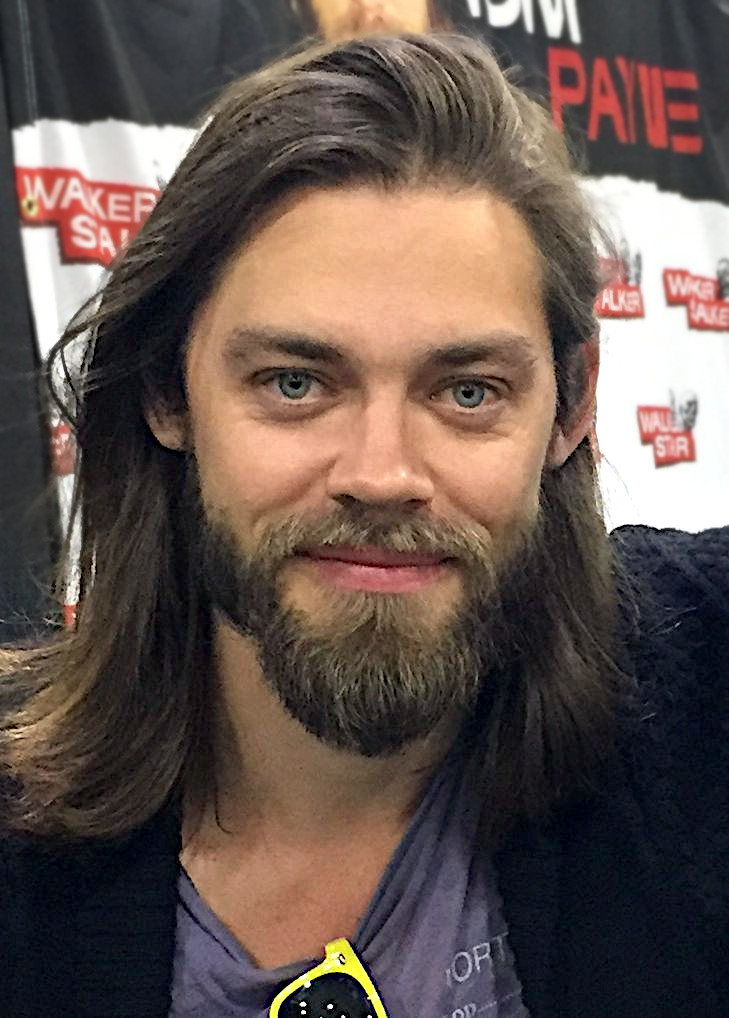
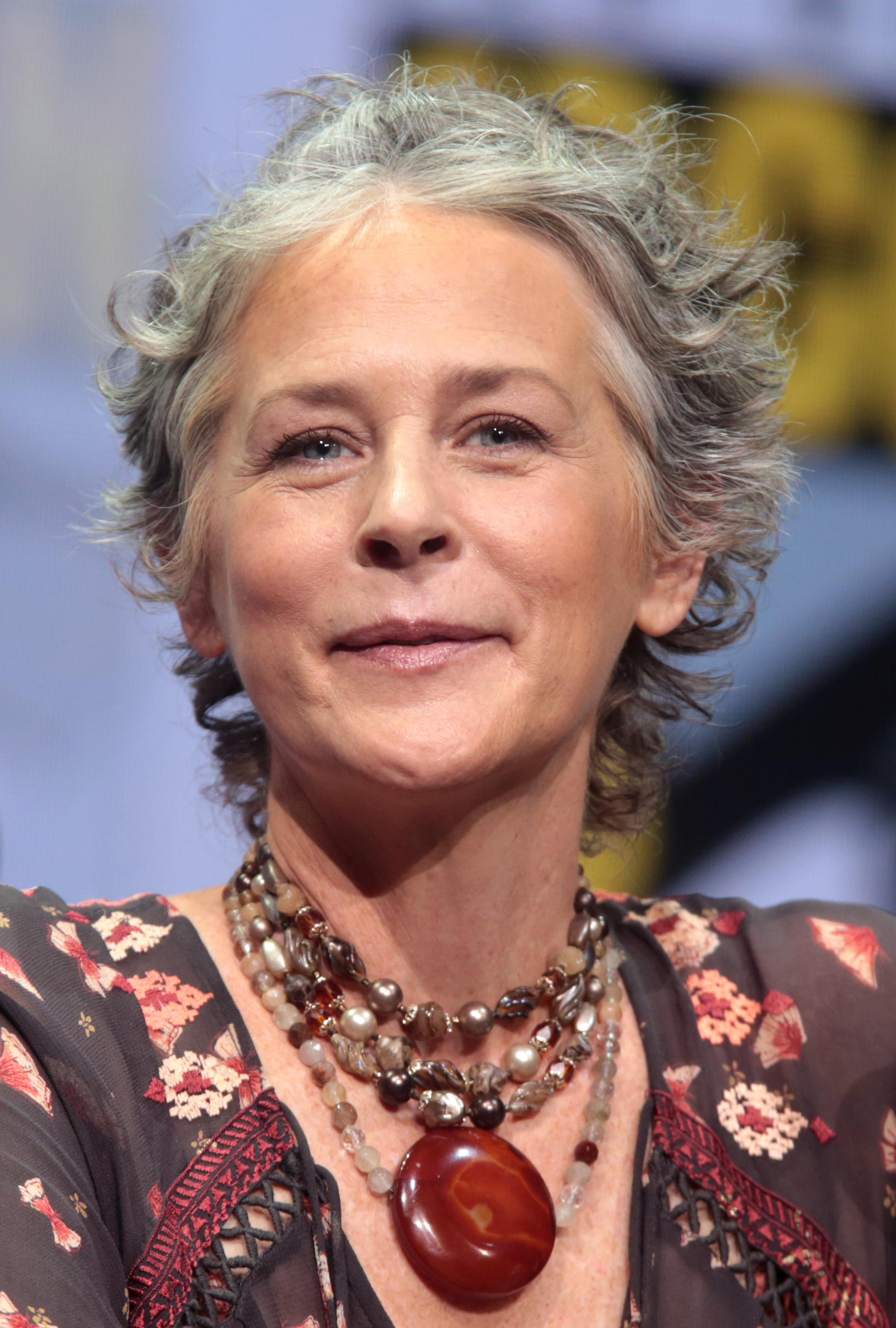
Andrew Lincoln (Rick Grimes), Tom Payne (Paul "Jesus" Rovia), and Melissa McBride (Carol Peletier) reprised their Walking Dead roles in this episode.

On April 14, 2017, AMC renewed the series for a 16-episode fourth season and announced that Andrew Chambliss and Ian Goldberg would replace the departing Dave Erickson as showrunners. Production began in November 2017 in Austin, Texas. Michael E. Satrazemis, a director of photography for The Walking Dead and director of 12 episodes, joined Fear the Walking Dead as a directing-producer.

In November 2017, it was reported that Lennie James who portrays Morgan Jones on The Walking Dead would crossover and join the main cast in the fourth season. The fourth season also sees the additions of several new series regulars, played by Garret Dillahunt, Jenna Elfman, and Maggie Grace.

The fourth season features a redesigned title sequence with new theme music. Each episode of the season has a different title card, and tells a story which will become apparent once the season is completed. The Hollywood Reporter reflected on the new intro, calling the new season, "a Western with zombies, very much by design."

== Reception ==
"What's Your Story?" received critical acclaim from critics. On Rotten Tomatoes, "What's Your Story?" garnered a perfect 100% rating, with an average score of 8.88/10 based on 17 reviews. The sites critical consensus reads; "'What's Your Story?' breathes new life into Fear, taking its time to introduce new storylines and characters that will push the show into the wild, wild west." Matt Fowler of IGN gave "What's Your Story?" an 8.3/10 rating, stating; "Fear the Walking Dead was smart to have Morgan join up with a few new characters before he collided with Madison's crew. It allowed us to meet some new faces (including Garret Dillahunt's instantly-great John) and get to know them within the context of Morgan's terse moodiness before the hammer dropped at the end and the ultimate connection to the former cast, and story, was revealed."

=== Ratings ===
The episode was seen by 4.09 million viewers in the United States on its original air date, far above the previous episodes ratings of 2.23 million viewers.
