= All the World Is Sleeping =

American film by Ryan Lacen

- Theatrical release poster
- Directed by: Ryan Lacen
- Written by: Ryan Lacen
- Produced by: Ian Simon; Ryan Lacen; Sonja Mereu; Anthony Baldino
- Starring: Melissa Barrera; Kristen Gutoskie; Lisandra Tena; Luis Bordonada; Jackie Cruz; Jorge Garcia
- Cinematography: Michael Garcia
- Edited by: Eric Seo
- Music by: Emily Greene
- Production companies: Bold Futures; Normal Films
- Distributed by: Gravitas Ventures
- Release dates: September 16, 2021 (NYLFF); March 17, 2023 (United States)
- Running time: 111 minutes
- Country: United States
- Language: English

All the World Is Sleeping is a 2021 drama film written and directed by Ryan Lacen in his feature film debut. It stars Melissa Barrera, Kristen Gutoskie, Lisandra Tena, Luis Bordonada, Jackie Cruz and Jorge Garcia.

== Synopsis ==
In New Mexico a young woman resolved not to make the same mistakes as her parents but addiction issues threatens her life with her own daughter.

== Cast ==
- Melissa Barrera as Chama
  - Valentina Herrera as young Chama
- Jackie Cruz as Toaster
- Kristen Gutoskie as Nell
- Luis Bordonada as Santi
- Lisandra Tena as Beatriz
- Alma Sisneros as Gata
- Cory Scott Allen as Al Taylor
- Dave Edwards as Dr. Bundy
- Jorge Garcia as Nick

== Production ==
Written and directed by Ryan Lacen, the project was produced by Anthony Baldino, Charlene Bencomo, Micaela Cadena, Ryan Lacen and Sonja Mereu. Lacen told Deadline Hollywood that "a unique collaboration with the non-profit Bold Futures" meant that the project "is not only based on the lived experiences of seven women with a history of addiction, it was made by them". He added "As a director, whose own family has been affected by addiction, my intention was to create a film that felt truthful". Barrera plays a composite character based on the experiences of Bold Futures (formerly known as Young Women United), which is a New Mexico-based reproductive justice nonprofit organisation.

== Release ==
The film was shown at the New York Latino Film Festival on September 16, 2021. The film became available to stream on-demand, and had a limited theater release in the United States on March 17, 2023.

== Reception ==
On the review aggregator website Rotten Tomatoes, 100% of five critics' reviews are positive, with an average rating of 7.2/10. Michael Talbot-Haynes in Film Threat described the film as a "genuine ethnographic study in the oral tradition as much as a dramatic feature" and that it is “one of the most honest and harrowing studies of addiction since Requiem for a Dream".
