= Red Dirt (Fear the Walking Dead) =

- Fear the Walking Dead episode
- Episode no.: Season 3 Episode 6
- Directed by: Courtney Hunt
- Written by: Wes Brown
- Original air date: July 2, 2017
- Running time: 43 minutes

Guest appearances
- Rae Gray as Gretchen Trimbol; Michael William Freeman as Blake Sarno

Episode chronology
← Previous "Burning in Water, Drowning in Flame"	Next → "The Unveiling"
- Fear the Walking Dead (season 3)

"Red Dirt" is the sixth episode of the third season of the post-apocalyptic horror television series Fear the Walking Dead, which aired on AMC on July 2, 2017.

== Plot ==
Troy's patrol return with news of Walker's ultimatum; that night bonfires ring Broke Jaw, unnerving the sheltered people. Gretchen's family leaves despite Troy's threatening efforts to keep them for security measures. Madison sides with Troy and urges Jeremiah to keep his community together. Jake journeys to Black Hat to negotiate peace terms with Walker. Madison, Nick and Jeremiah later find Gretchen and her family murdered and turned; they all realize Troy was responsible but Madison informs the community that Walker did it to prepare them for the upcoming conflict. Alicia buys their story and runs after Jake to warn him.

== Reception ==
"Red Dirt", received very positive reviews from critics. On Rotten Tomatoes, "Red Dirt" garnered an 86% rating, with an average score of 7.56/10 based on 7 reviews.

Matt Fowler of IGN gave "Red Dirt" a 7.8/10.0 rating, stating; "Fear the Walking Dead may be suffering a little from the slight inertia of delivering a solely ranch-centric episode, but it's still burning through story at a decent pace. It's a good mix, and this chapter basically jumped us forward in a big way regarding Madison's rise to the role of de facto leader - with her pulling Troy's strings and each of her kids now also paired up with an Otto. She's going to trick people into fighting for this land for their own good. Because she knows that there's worse out there."

=== Ratings ===
"Red Dirt" was seen by 2.19 million viewers in the United States on its original air date, below the previous episodes rating of 2.50 million.
