= La Serpiente =

- Fear the Walking Dead episode
- Episode no.: Season 3 Episode 11
- Directed by: Josef Wladyka
- Written by: Mark Richard; Lauren Signorino
- Original air date: September 17, 2017
- Running time: 43 minutes

Guest appearances
- Michael Greyeyes as Qaletaqa Walker; Jesse Borrego as Efraín Morales

Episode chronology
← Previous "The Diviner"	Next → "Brother's Keeper"
- Fear the Walking Dead (season 3)

"La Serpiente" (Spanish for The Snake), is the eleventh episode of the third season of the post-apocalyptic horror television series Fear the Walking Dead, which aired on AMC on September 17, 2017.

== Plot ==
Madison, Strand and Walker drive the tanker to Mexico, then crawl through tunnels to the dam. Madison tells Daniel that Ofelia is alive at the ranch but they need water. Lola refuses a trade, but invites Madison to bring her family and work for her. Daniel thinks it better that Ofelia not know he's alive, though he is displeased to learn that Walker turned her into a murderer. Daniel and Efrain propose different courses to Lola. Walker leaves on foot, intending to force the ranchers out. Daniel fears the dissatisfied people will rise against Lola, and sanctions Strand to act if their interests align. A water truck explodes, punching a hole in the gate, and a slogan-chanting mob soon appear. Lola is convinced to trade 10,000 gallons of water per week for weapons, with the first exchange at the bazaar in 5 days. Lola wants Ofelia to be there. Strand and Madison drive back, picking up Walker on the road.

== Reception ==
David S.E Zapanta of Den of Geek gave "La Serpiente" a positive review, with a 4/5 rating, stating; "Fear is smart to keep tensions simmering between Walker and Victor."

Steve Ford of TV Fanatic also gave "La Serpiente" a positive review, with a 4/5 rating, stating; "Other than the opening of the episode, the rest of it was pretty solid."

=== Ratings ===
"La Serpiente" was seen by 1.99 million viewers in the United States on its original air date, below the previous episodes rating of 2.14 million.
