= Kristen Gutoskie =

Canadian actress

- Born: Toronto, Ontario, Canada
- Education: Wilfrid Laurier University
- Occupation: Actress
- Years active: 1999–present

Kristen Gutoskie is a Canadian actress. She is known for her roles as Katie Frank in Containment, Rachael in Beaver Falls, Seline in The Vampire Diaries and Molly Hendricks in Lethal Weapon.

== Biography ==
Kristen Gutoskie has been an actress, singer and dancer since the age of 12. She grew up in the suburbs of Toronto with her mother, a nurse, her father, a computer salesman and her older sister. She skipped classes in school because she thought it was "cool". During her youth, she won many competitions as a solo singer and competed with many dance groups.

She began working in theater, television and film. She completed an Honors Arts Degree at Wilfrid Laurier University where she took hip-hop classes in her spare time. During her senior year, she traveled as an exchange student to Australia, New Zealand, Europe and South Africa. Following her travels, she moved to Los Angeles. She has appeared in productions on networks such as E4, ABC, A&E, The CW, CBC and Global TV2. She has also appeared in numerous independent films. She writes music, sings and volunteers in her spare time. She has developed her own non-profit campaign.

== Filmography ==
Film roles
Year	Title	Role	Notes
2009	Recession Dating	Janet	Short film
2009	Manson, My Name Is Evil	Hotel Guest	Uncredited
2011	Moon Point	Sarah Cherry	
2013	That's So Relatable: Soon or Later	Amber	
2013	Playground of Dreams	Audrey	Short film
2016	The Dust Storm	Nora	Direct-to-video
2017	Sightless	Ellen	Short film
2020	Eat Wheaties!	Suzie the Bankteller	
2021	Jonesin'	Gina	
2021	All the World Is Sleeping	Nell	

Television roles
Year	Title	Role	Notes
1999	Restless Spirits	Daughter of Coli	Television film
2000	Real Kids, Real Adventures	Sherry Dicker	Episode: "Through the Ice: The Sherry Dicker Story"
2001	In a Heartbeat	Donna	Episode: "Hero"
2000–2001	System Crash	N/A	2 episodes
2002	Verdict in Blood	Leah	Television film
2010	Pure Pwnage	Femme Fatale	Episode: "Losing to a n00b"
2009–2010	Aaron Stone	Beth	Episodes: "Game On", "Sparks"
2011	Breakout Kings	Rose	Episode: "Paid in Full"
2011	Rookie Blue	Miranda	Episode: "Butterflies"
2010–2011	Being Erica	Georgie Giacomelli	Episodes: "Fa La Erica", "Osso Barko"
2011	Originals	Trish	9 episodes
2011–2012	Beaver Falls	Rachael	Main role
2013	Republic of Doyle	Kyla MacRury	3 episode
2016–2017	Relationship Status	Pembrooke	Web series; main role
2016	Containment	Katie Frank	Main role; originally titled Cordon
2016–2017	The Vampire Diaries	Seline	Recurring role (season 8); 9 episodes
2017, 2019–2021	The Handmaid's Tale	Beth	Recurring role (seasons 1, 3–4); 10 episodes
2017–2018	Lethal Weapon	Molly Hendricks	Recurring role (season 2); 10 episodes
2018–present	Chicago Fire	Chloe Cruz	Recurring role (season 7–present)
2021	Narcos: Mexico	Dani	Main role (season 3)
2021	Y: The Last Man	Sonia	Recurring role; 4 episodes

As a producer
Year	Title	Notes
2009	Recession Dating	Producer
2013	Playground of Dreams	Producer
2015	5PiX	Executive producer
