= Daniel Sharman =

English actor (born 1986)

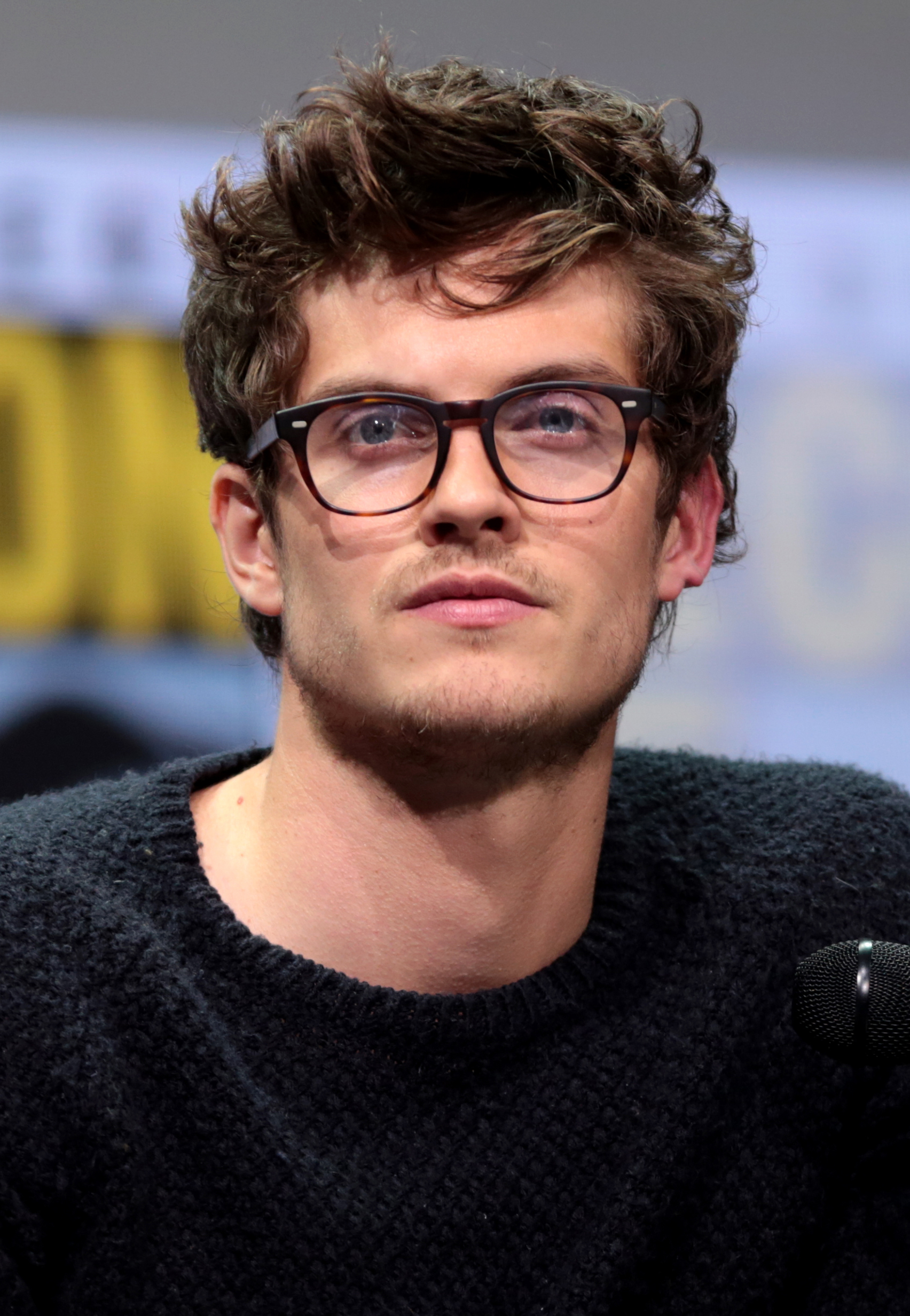
- Sharman in 2017
- Born: Daniel Andrew Sharman; 25 April 1986 (age 40); London, England
- Citizenship: United Kingdom; United States
- Education: London Academy of Music and Dramatic Art
- Occupation: Actor
- Years active: 2003–present

Daniel Andrew Sharman (born 25 April 1986) is an English actor. He is known for his roles as Isaac Lahey on the television series Teen Wolf (2012–2014), Kaleb Westphall / Kol Mikaelson on The Originals (2014–2015), Troy Otto on Fear the Walking Dead (2017, 2023), Lorenzo de' Medici in Medici: The Magnificent (2018), and the Weeping Monk in Cursed (2020). He also starred in the film Immortals (2011).

== Early life and education ==
Sharman was born and raised in Hackney, London. He started acting as a child at the age of nine when he auditioned for the Royal Shakespeare Company and was selected out of hundreds of other children. Of his venture into the dramatic arts, he stated: "I just adored it. Between Macbeth and Henry VI with all of the armour and the blood and everything, it was just fantastic as a kid. It was the best thing ever." Sharman stayed with the Royal Shakespeare Company for two plays: The Park in 1995 (age 9) and Macbeth in 1996 (age 10).

Sharman attended Mill Hill School and also the Arts Educational School, both in London. During his school years, he acted in the play "Kvetch" that made it to the Edinburgh Fringe festival. He also acted in the touring play The Winslow Boy in 2002 at age 16.

For three years, from 2004 to 2007, Sharman studied at the London Academy of Music and Dramatic Art, gaining a Bachelor of Arts degree in acting and graduating with honors. After that, he performed in many theatrical productions in London and Europe.

== Career ==
Sharman's first feature film role was in the independent film The Last Days of Edgar Harding, in which he played a musician. In 2010, he was cast as Ares, the Greek god of war, in the fantasy film Immortals; the film was released in 2011. Sharman initially had difficulty transition to acting on film, as he found it "odd and unnatural", but he eventually adjusted. Sharman also appeared in the horror film The Collection, released in November 2012.

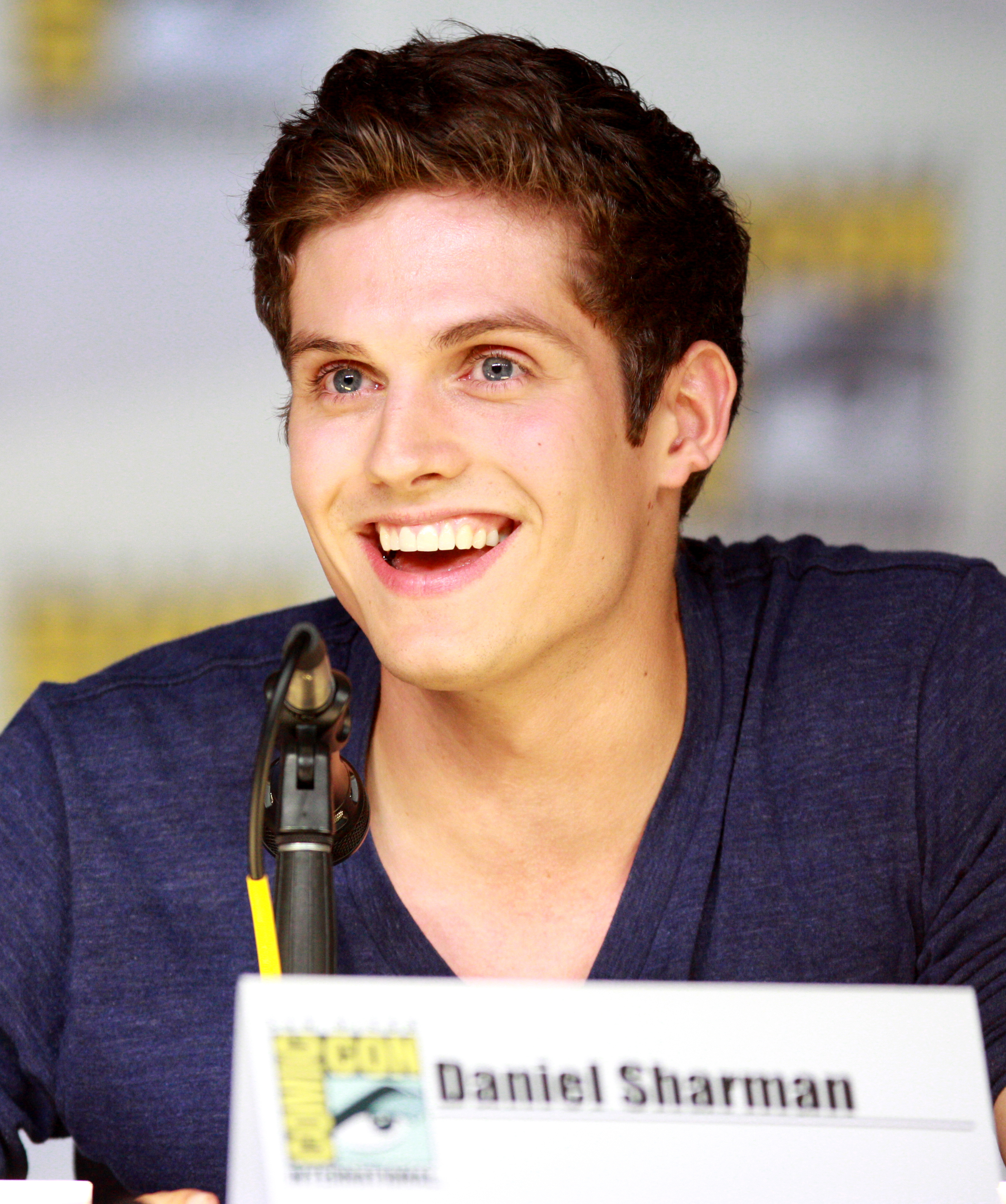
Sharman at San Diego Comic-Con in 2013

Sharman's television credits include roles in Judge John Deed, Inspector Lewis and the television films Starting Over and When Calls the Heart . Beginning in 2012, Sharman had a major recurring role as werewolf Isaac Lahey in MTV's supernatural drama series Teen Wolf. In the following year, Sharman narrated the audiobook version of Cassandra Clare's young adult novel Clockwork Princess, the third and final installment of her Infernal Devices trilogy. In March 2014, after the season 3 finale, it was announced that Sharman would be leaving Teen Wolf as he wanted to explore other opportunities.

He joined The Originals as the recurring character Kaleb Westphall in May 2014. In March 2015, it was confirmed that Sharman had landed the lead role in the CBS medical drama pilot LFE; however, the pilot was ultimately not picked up by the network. In that same year, he joined the Williamstown Theatre Festival for the play Off the Main Road.

In 2017, he joined the cast of AMC's Fear the Walking Dead as a series regular in the role of Troy Otto. The third season of the series premiered on 5 June of the same year. In the eighth season in 2023, Sharman reprised the role.

On 10 August 2017, it was reported that Sharman had been cast in the lead role in Medici: The Magnificent. He portrays Lorenzo de' Medici for the planned two season run of the series. The two seasons of Medici: The Magnificent serve as the second and third season of the Medici franchise and are set 20 years after the events of the loosely connected first season, named Medici: Masters of Florence.

In March 2019, Sharman joined Cursed, a Netflix television series based on a re-imagining of the Arthurian legend.

On 6 January 2022, it was announced that Sharman had joined the main cast for Sky Max Series A Town Called Malice, where he plays Kelly Lord, the middle child of the Lord family.

== Filmography ==
=== Film ===
Year	Title	Role	Notes
2010	The Last Days of Edgar Harding	Harry	
2011	Immortals	Ares	
2012	The Collection	Basil	
2016	Albion: The Enchanted Stallion	Lir	
2023	Every Man For Himself	Driver	
2024	The Fix	Eric O'Connors	
TBA	Good Morning It's the Cops	Michael	Filming

=== Television ===
Year	Title	Role	Notes	Ref.
2003	Judge John Deed	Andy Dobbs	Episode: "Judicial Review"	
2007	Starting Over	Alexander Dewhurst	Television film	
2009	Lewis	Richard Scott	Episode: "The Quality of Mercy"	
2011	The Nine Lives of Chloe King	Zane	2 episodes	
2012–2014	Teen Wolf	Isaac Lahey	Recurring role (seasons 2–3)	
2013	When Calls the Heart	Edward Montclair	Television film	
2014–2015	The Originals	Kaleb Westphall / Kol Mikaelson	Recurring role (season 2)	
2015	LFE	Joe	Unaired television pilot	
2017	Mercy Street	Lord Edward	2 episodes	
2017, 2023	Fear the Walking Dead	Troy Otto	Main role (seasons 3 & 8)	
2018–2019	Medici: The Magnificent	Lorenzo de' Medici	Main role (seasons 2–3)	
2020	Cursed	The Weeping Monk / Lancelot	Main role	
2023	A Town Called Malice	Kelly Lord	Main role	

=== Music videos ===
Year	Title	Artist(s)	Role	Ref.
2016	"Where's the Love?"	The Black Eyed Peas featuring The World	Himself	
2022	"Gran Hotel"	Interpol	N/A	

== Awards and nominations ==
Year	Award	Category	Work	Result
2015	FilmQuest, US	Best Actor – Short	Drone	Nominated
