= Lisandra Tena =

American actress

- Born: Albuquerque, New Mexico
- Occupation: Actress
- Years active: 2007–present

Lisandra Tena is an American actress, best known for her role as Lola Guerrero on the AMC horror drama series Fear the Walking Dead.

== Career ==
In 2017, she joined the cast of Fear the Walking Dead in the series regular role of Lola Guerrero.

== Filmography ==
=== Film ===
Year	Title	Role	Notes
2007	La Trinchera Luminosa del President Gonzalo	—	
2008	Spinners	Leticia	Short film
2011	The Cutback	Knifefighter	Short film
2014	Una mujer sin precio 1961	Maribella	Short film
2014	Everything Will Be All Right	Rebecca	Short film
2014	Rain, Rain	Woman	Short film
2019	Ernesto's Manifesto	Veronica	
2021	All the World Is Sleeping	Beatriz	
2022	Cowboy Drifter	Deputy Gonzales	

=== Television ===
Year	Title	Role	Notes
2014	Chicago P.D.	Lina Ochoa	2 episodes
2017	Fear the Walking Dead	Lola Guerrero	Main role: 5 episodes (Season 3)
2017	Talking Dead	Herself	Episode discussed: "La Serpiente"
2017	NCIS: Los Angeles	Gina Fuentes	1 episode
2018	Code Black	Hilda Sallander	1 episode
2018	The Good Place	Officer Ramirez	Episode: “Everything Is Bonzer!”
2019–20	Good Trouble	Teresa	8 episodes
2022	NCIS	Pramedic Maria Santiago	1 episode

=== Videogame ===
Year	Title	Role	Notes
2023	Starfield	Seokguh Syndicate	Voice
