= Justin Rain =

Canadian actor (born 1981)

- Born: October 27, 1981 (age 44); Vancouver, British Columbia, Canada
- Occupation: Actor
- Years active: 2008–present

Justin Rain (born October 27, 1981) is a Canadian First Nations actor. He is of Plains Cree descent.

== Biography ==
Justin Rain was raised in Prince Albert, Saskatchewan, where he attended St. Mary's High School. Justin began abusing drugs in his youth which became problematic to the point that he overdosed several times and almost died. Of that point in his life he stated, "I was no honor student, I barely passed my classes. And it was all because I was running from who I was and the artist inside me." He began to distance himself from his friends and decided to pursue architecture where he attempted to get into British Columbia Institute of Technology. He eventually encountered other actors and began to appreciate the craft, ultimately deciding to go to Vancouver Academy of Dramatic Arts. Not long after, Justin earned his break in a very minor role in the movie The Twilight Saga: Eclipse.

Justin appeared in the indie film Two Indians Talking where he won Best Supporting Actor at the Winnipeg Aboriginal Film Festival. He was cast in a major role on the First Nations oriented Blackstone as Alan Fraser before joining the cast of Defiance as Quentin McCawley. He joined the cast of Fear the Walking Dead as Crazy Dog.

== Filmography ==
=== Film ===
Year	Title	Role	Notes
2008	The Dance of My Beating Heart	Joseph	Short
2009	Mountain Spirit	Brent	Short
2010	The Twilight Saga: Eclipse	Quileute Warrior	
2010	Two Indians Talking	Adam	
2012	The Arrival Hour	John	Short
2014	Not Indian Enough	Bradley	Short
2014	Wool	Makoyepuk	Short
2015	North Mountain	Wolf	
2017	Mohawk	Calvin Two Rivers	
2017	Lean on Pete	Mike	
2017	Past Time	Sage	Short
2018	Primal Rage	Deputy	
2018	Road of Iniquity	Leonard	
2019	Douk	vader	Short
2020	Brother, I Cry	Jon	

=== Television ===
Year	Title	Role	Notes
2008	The Guard	Frank	Episode: "Fistful of Rain"
2011–2015	Blackstone	Alan Fraser	Main cast
2012	The Killing	Benny	Episode: "Keylela"
2013–2015	Defiance	Quentin McCawley	Recurring
2014	Arctic Air	Brian	Episode: "High Water"
2015	Heartland	Emmett	Episode: "Riders on the Storm"
2017	The Arrangement	Sam	Episode: "Trips"
2017	Fear the Walking Dead	Crazy Dog/Lee	Recurring, 10 Episodes
2018	Guardians Evolution	Arimus Afron	Season 3
2020	Tribal	Ryan Streit	7 episodes
2021	Chicago Med	Robert Forbes	Episode: "Some Things Are Worth the Risk"
2022–2024	Resident Alien	Elliot	8 episodes

=== Videogame ===
Year	Title	Role	Notes
2023	Starfield	Floyd Jenkins	Voice
