= Ouroboros (Fear the Walking Dead) =

- Fear the Walking Dead episode
- Episode no.: Season 2 Episode 3
- Directed by: Stefan Schwartz
- Written by: Alan Page
- Original air date: April 24, 2016
- Running time: 43 minutes

Guest appearances
- Dan Donohue as Michael; Brendan Meyer as Jake

Episode chronology
← Previous "We All Fall Down"	Next → "Blood in the Streets"
- Fear the Walking Dead (season 2)

"Ouroboros" is the third episode of the second season, and the 9th episode overall of the post-apocalyptic horror television series Fear the Walking Dead, which aired on AMC on April 24, 2016.

This episode revealed the fate of the survivors of the Fear the Walking Dead: Flight 462 webisodes where Michelle Ang who played Alex survived and was added as a series regular, but was only credited as a regular for this episode and the fifth episode of the season Captive.

== Plot ==
After discovering that San Diego had been destroyed, Madison confronts Strand about his true destination, which Daniel has discovered to be Baja California in Mexico. Strand reveals to the group that he has a safe place in Baja with supplies, and promises that he will take the entire group there, but that they only have limited time to make it. That night, the Abigail begins to unexpectedly malfunction, and Travis attempts to investigate the issue, which he discovers to be an undead clogging the water intake. While he makes the necessary repairs, Nick, Alicia, Chris, and Daniel use the Abigail's launch boat to travel ashore to scavenge supplies from a plane crash. Inside the wreckage, Chris finds a severely injured survivor, who begs Chris to kill him; he reluctantly fulfills the man's request. The group is separated when a horde of undead arrive, and Daniel runs into another survivor from the plane crash, Alex, who helps him evade the undead and get back to the launch boat, where he meets with Chris and Alicia. Nick arrives shortly after covered in blood, though he reveals that the blood is not his own but is instead from one of the undead, as he discovers that disguising himself as an infected provides camouflage.

The five of them escape on the launch boat, but Alex requests that they make a brief to stop to rescue another plane crash survivor, Jake, who is severely injured and located on a life raft nearby. They tow the raft back to the Abigail, where Travis has successfully made all repairs. They debate with Strand on whether or not they should take the new survivors aboard; Strand refuses to do so, as he believes that Jake's injuries mean he is likely to soon die and then reanimate. The group reaches a compromise by towing the two crash survivors in their life raft. That afternoon, however, Strand unexpectedly cuts the tow line, leaving Alex and Jake adrift on their raft, to the horror of the rest of the group.

== Reception ==
"Ouroboros" received mostly positive reviews from critics. On Rotten Tomatoes, it garnered an 83% rating with an average score of 6.5/10 based on 12 reviews. The site consensus reads: "A powerful crossover with sister web series Flight 462, 'Ouroboros' adds depth to the Walking Dead universe with enough fierce action and set changes to enliven the show's still-fuzzy perspective."

Matt Fowler of IGN gave "Ouroboros" a 7.5/10 rating stating: "'Ouroboros' benefitted greatly from some intense zombie action and the inclusion of the two main characters from the Flight 462 tie-in series. Not that you'd need to watch the webisodes to enjoy this chapter. It should have only enhanced your experience. A TV show should never rely on supplemental material in a way that makes all the side bells and whistles necessary viewing. It should be able to stand on its own. Which I think 'Ouroboros' did, as Charlie's enigmatic nature requires no extra padding/explanation."

=== Ratings ===
"Ouroboros" was seen by 4.73 million viewers in the United States on its original air date, below the previous episodes rating of 5.58 million by 750,000.
