= Captive (Fear the Walking Dead) =

- Fear the Walking Dead episode
- Episode no.: Season 2 Episode 5
- Directed by: Craig Zisk
- Written by: Carla Ching
- Original air date: May 8, 2016
- Running time: 43 minutes

Guest appearances
- Veronica Diaz as Vida; Mark Kelly as Connor; Jesse McCartney as Reed; Arturo Del Puerto as Luis Flores; Daniel Zovatto as Jack Kipling

Episode chronology
← Previous "Blood in the Streets"	Next → "Sicut Cervus"
- Fear the Walking Dead (season 2)

"Captive" is the fifth episode of the second season, and the 11th episode overall of the post-apocalyptic horror television series Fear the Walking Dead, which aired on AMC on May 8, 2016.

This episode marked the final appearance of Michelle Ang as Alex from the Fear the Walking Dead: Flight 462 webisodes. Ang only appeared in two episodes credited as a series regular.

== Plot ==
The group tends to the wounds of Reed, who they have taken hostage, and discover that he is the brother of Connor, the leader of the group of pirates. Daniel realizes that this provides them with leverage, and they plan to use Reed as a bargaining chip to trade for Travis and Alicia, who Connor has taken to his base. At their base, Alicia is trained in the operations of the pirate gang, including how they target and coerce vessels into revealing their location. She attempts to befriend Jack to gain his trust, and tries to determine if her family is alive, though Jack admits he is not sure. When they discover that the Abigail is arriving at the base ahead of schedule, she assumes that the pirates had executed her family instead of bringing them to shore as promised, and she manages to convince Jack to help her escape. The two of them plan to use one of the pirate group's boats to flee and live together. Meanwhile, Travis is held captive in a cell, where he is taunted by Alex, who reveals that she was forced to put down her fellow survivor, Jake, after Travis' group left them adrift, and she joined Connor's group and helped them locate the Abigail.

Meanwhile, aboard the Abigail, Chris is left to watch Reed, who taunts and threatens him. After some time, Chris uses Reed's own gun to shoot him in the face, killing him; he tells Madison that Reed was about to turn into an undead, but she remains skeptical and worries that he is becoming unhinged. Suddenly, however, Reed reanimates as an undead, indicating that Chris failed to destroy his brain. Instead of putting him down, Daniel realizes that they can use the reanimated Reed to trade for Alicia and Travis by covering the corpse's head with a bag and tricking Connor into thinking that Reed is alive and unharmed. Connor and his men wait on the dock with Travis, preparing for the trade, as Madison heads to shore with the reanimated Reed. She arrives and is able to trade for Travis' release; when she turns over the reanimated Reed, he attacks and kills Connor and several of his men. Meanwhile, Jack discovers that Alicia is missing from her post, and he discovers her on the roof of the building; she says that she no longer wants to leave with him and instead wants to return to her family, and she jumps off the roof and into the water below, where she reunites with Travis and Madison, and the three of them head back to the yacht.

== Reception ==
"Captive" received negative reviews from critics. On Rotten Tomatoes, it garnered a 46% rating, with an average score of 6.71/10 based on 13 reviews. The site consensus reads, "'Captive' is an unbalanced episode rife with uneventful chatter and bad character decisions, ending a brief storyline that feels pointless and incomplete."

Matt Fowler of IGN gave "Captive" a 7.0/10.0 rating stating; ""Captive" had an exciting premise and held a lot of promise, but it never quite came together like it should have. Alicia should have been allowed to do more to facilitate her own escape/rescue and the goofy hooded zombie plan only seems to work - well - because the show wanted it to work. Also, at this point, Chris needs to get towed behind the Abigail on a raft. Still, I enjoyed Madison and Daniel taking control of the situation and just heading into a big conflict against superior forces because they had no other choice."

=== Ratings ===
"Captive" was seen by 4.41 million viewers in the United States on its original air date, below the previous episode's rating of 4.80 million.
