= Sicut Cervus (Fear the Walking Dead) =

- Fear the Walking Dead episode
- Episode no.: Season 2 Episode 6
- Directed by: Kate Dennis
- Written by: Brian Buckner
- Original air date: May 15, 2016
- Running time: 46 minutes

Guest appearances
- Dougray Scott as Thomas Abigail; Marlene Forté as Celia Flores; Arturo Del Puerto as Luis Flores

Episode chronology
← Previous "Captive"	Next → "Shiva"
- Fear the Walking Dead (season 2)

"Sicut Cervus" is the sixth episode of the second season, and the 12th episode overall of the post-apocalyptic horror television series Fear the Walking Dead, which aired on AMC on May 15, 2016.

== Plot ==
Strand arranges for payment to the Mexican military for safe passage, but a gunfight ensues leaving two officers and Luis, Strand's contact, almost dead. The group is able to bypass the remaining military and approach land. They depart from the Abigail and continue on to their destination, a compound formerly owned by the Abigail family and now housing a group led by Luis' mother, Celia. While en route, the group is attacked by a group of the undead and Madison is pinned to the ground; Chris stands by watching but doesn't make any attempt to help, which Alicia notices before killing Madison's attacker. The group continues onward until arriving at the compound where they are greeted by Celia, who tells them they are welcome inside but must leave their weapons outside. Inside, Strand meets with Thomas, whom he discovers has been bitten and is close to death; the two of them spend the rest of the evening together as Strand prepares for Thomas to die. That evening, Alicia tells Chris that she saw his inaction during Madison's attack, but he denies the events and threatens her if she tells anybody else. Nick and Celia begin to form a bond and she explains to him her view of the undead, which she believes is not true death but rather a "new beginning", which Nick begins to agree with. After a lengthy discussion, Strand decides to commit suicide so that he may die alongside Thomas. Celia prepares several communion wafers laced with poison for them both to eat, so that they can reanimate after their death.

At night, Daniel secretly begins exploring the compound and discovers a large horde of undead locked in a cage inside of a cellar, which he soon deduces consists of the family members of all the compound's residents. He confronts Celia about this, and she confirms his suspicions, but shows no remorse. Meanwhile, Alicia tells Madison about her confrontation with Chris, and Madison describes the situation to Travis, saying that she believes Chris isn't well. The two of them argue, with Travis retorting that Madison is simply refusing to help Chris, despite Travis always offering to help Nick during his addiction. Fearing for her safety, Madison decides to sleep with Alicia that night to provide comfort, but in the middle of the night, they are woken by a gunshot to find Chris standing over them, holding a knife; he quickly flees the room. The gunshot is revealed to be from Strand having shot Thomas in the head, with neither of them having eaten the communion wafers.

A series of flashbacks describes the congregation of a nearby church planning to take arms against Celia's cult-like community. Thomas drives to the church in an attempt to dissuade them, knowing that they would be unsuccessful; however he arrives too late and discovers all the congregation members collapse and die, and it is revealed that Celia secretly poisoned their communion wafers, killing them.

== Reception ==
"Sicut Cervus" received mostly positive reviews from critics. On Rotten Tomatoes, it garnered an 85% rating, with an average score of 6.48/10 based on 13 reviews. The site consensus reads, ""Sicut Cervus" offers up plenty of action, drama, and mystery, but it's the focus on family dynamics—and a change of setting—that bring out the best in the episode."

Matt Fowler of IGN gave "Sicut Cervus" a 7.4/10.0 rating stating; ""Sicut Cervus" took us to a new, fresh location full of possibilities. And while the show began to more definitively take a harsh stance on Chris' angry, cowardly acts, even pushing him further down that road, it was hindered by a new character who was too reminiscent of a Season 2 plot over on The Walking Dead."

=== Ratings ===
"Sicut Cervus" was seen by 4.49 million viewers in the United States on its original air date, slightly above the previous episodes rating of 4.41 million.
