= Fear the Walking Dead season 2 =

Fear the Walking Dead
- Season 2
- Home media cover art
- Showrunner: Dave Erickson
- Starring: Kim Dickens; Cliff Curtis; Frank Dillane; Alycia Debnam-Carey; Colman Domingo; Mercedes Mason; Lorenzo James Henrie; Rubén Blades; Michelle Ang
- No. of episodes: 15

Release
- Original network: AMC
- Original release: April 10 – October 2, 2016

Season chronology
- ← Previous; Season 1 Next → Season 3

The second season of Fear the Walking Dead, an American horror-drama television series on AMC, premiered on April 10, 2016, and concluded on October 2, 2016, consisting of fifteen episodes. The series is a companion series and prequel to The Walking Dead, which is based on the comic book series of the same name by Robert Kirkman, Tony Moore, and Charlie Adlard. The executive producers are Kirkman, David Alpert, Greg Nicotero, Gale Anne Hurd, and Dave Erickson, with Erickson as showrunner for the second consecutive season.

The season follows a dysfunctional, blended family composed of Madison Clark (Kim Dickens), her fiancé Travis Manawa (Cliff Curtis), her daughter Alicia (Alycia Debnam-Carey), her drug-addicted son Nick (Frank Dillane) and Travis's son Chris (Lorenzo James Henrie). At the onset of the zombie apocalypse, their group includes Victor Strand (Colman Domingo), a smart and sophisticated conman-turned-businessman, Daniel Salazar (Rubén Blades) and his daughter Ofelia (Mercedes Mason). This season follows the group as they escape land for the sea, and their eventual journey to Mexico.

== Production ==
On March 9, 2015, AMC announced it had ordered Fear the Walking Dead to series, with a two-season commitment.

== Cast ==
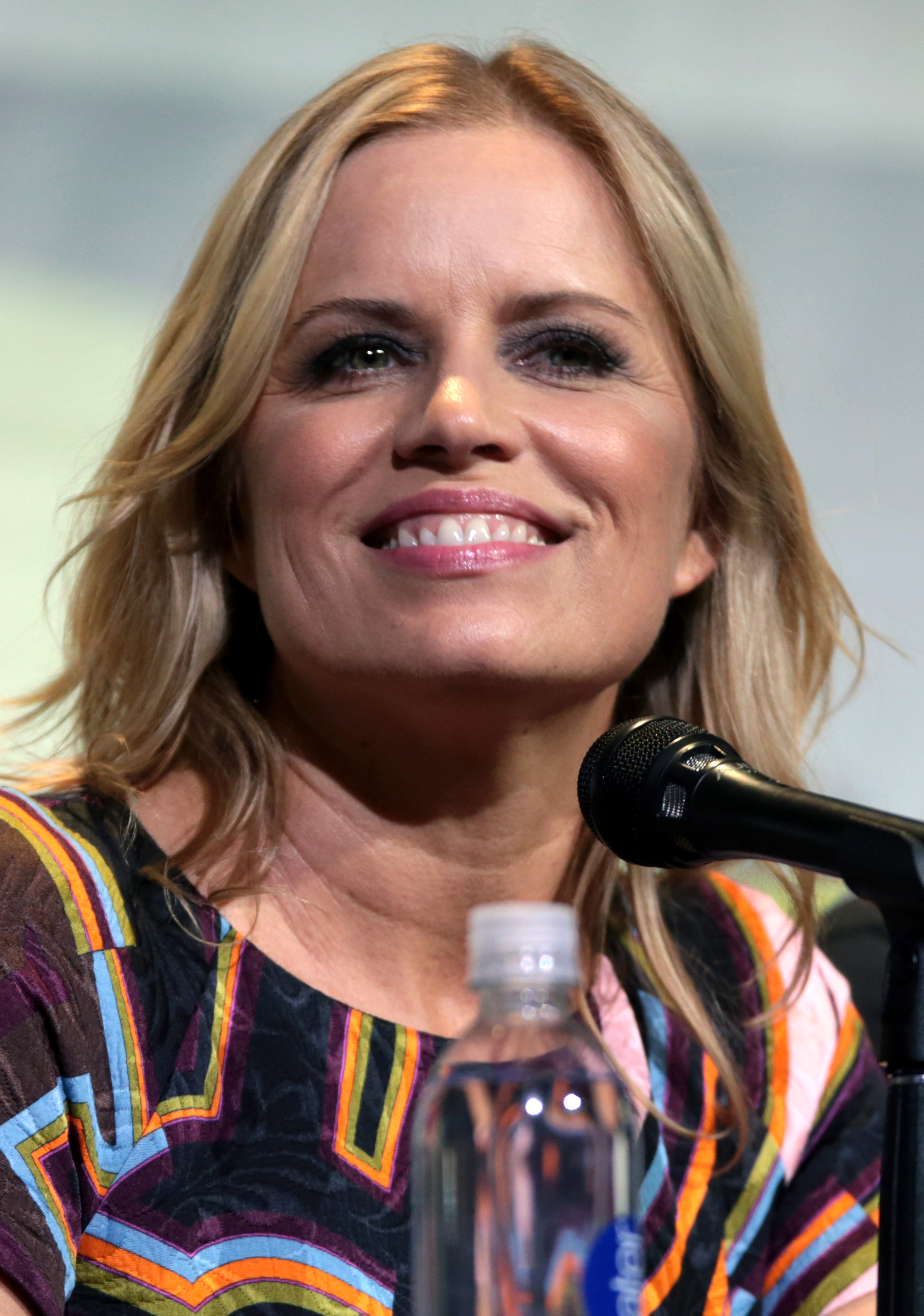
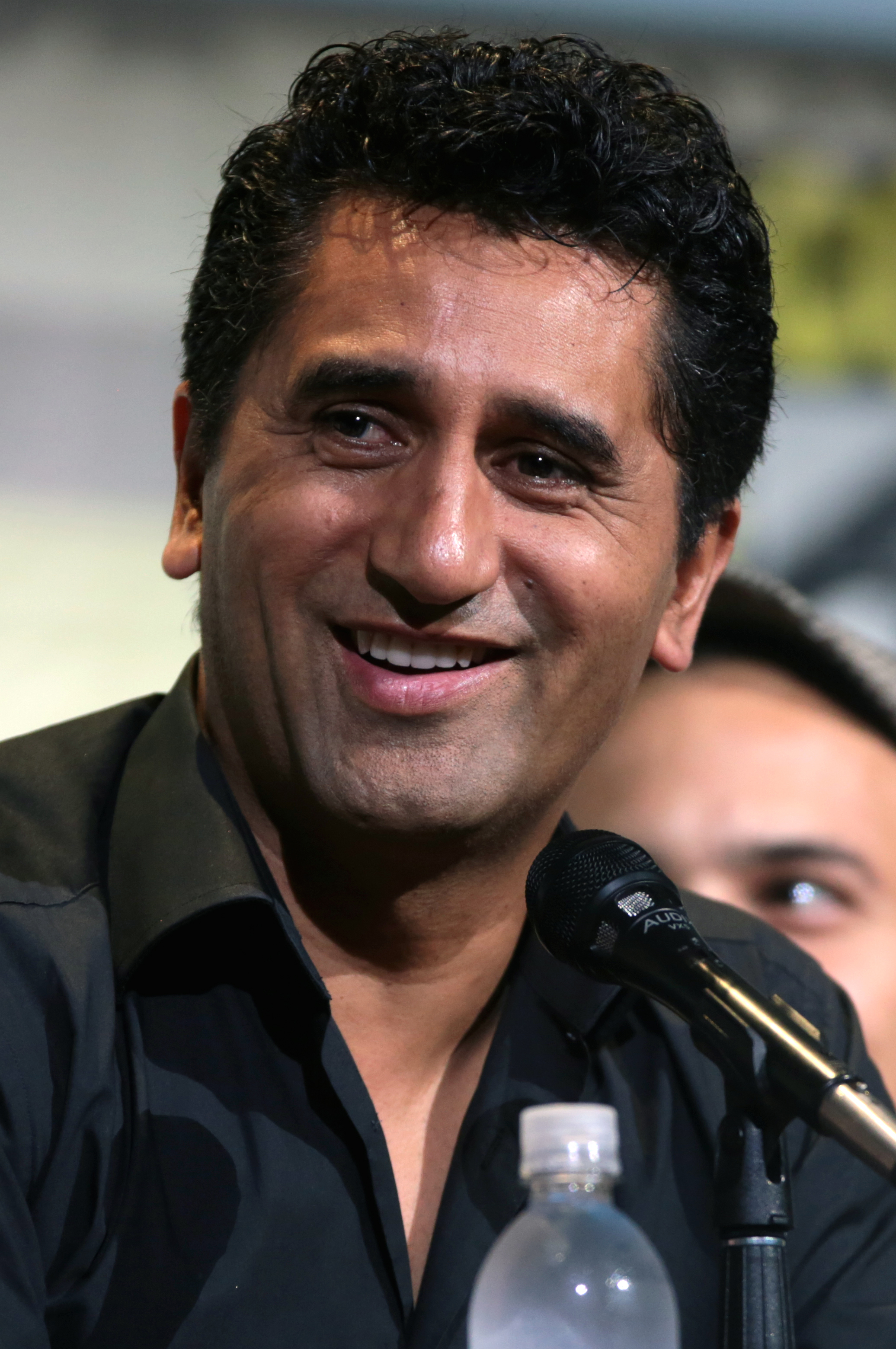
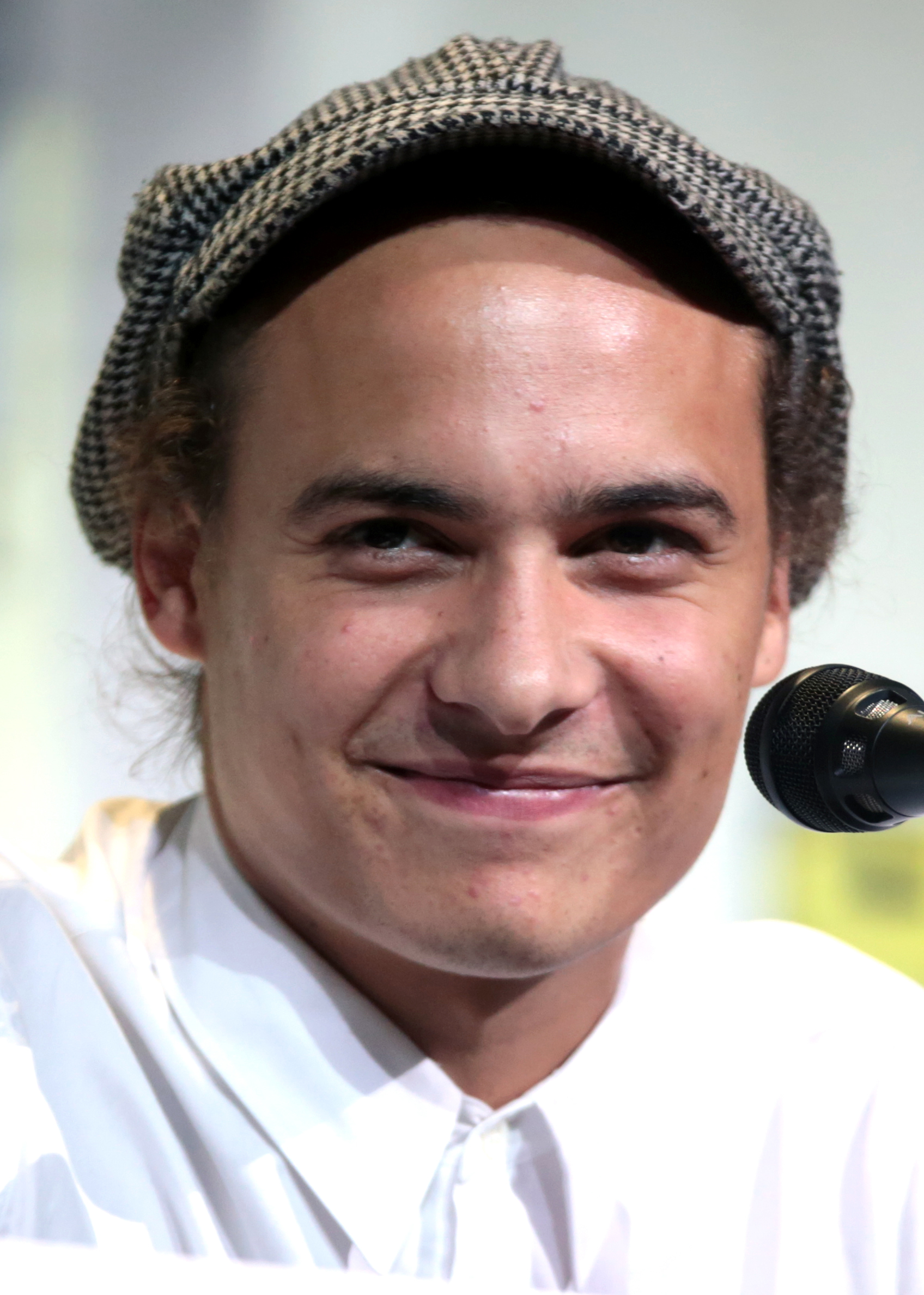
Kim Dickens (Madison Clark), Cliff Curtis (Travis Manawa) and Frank Dillane (Nick Clark)
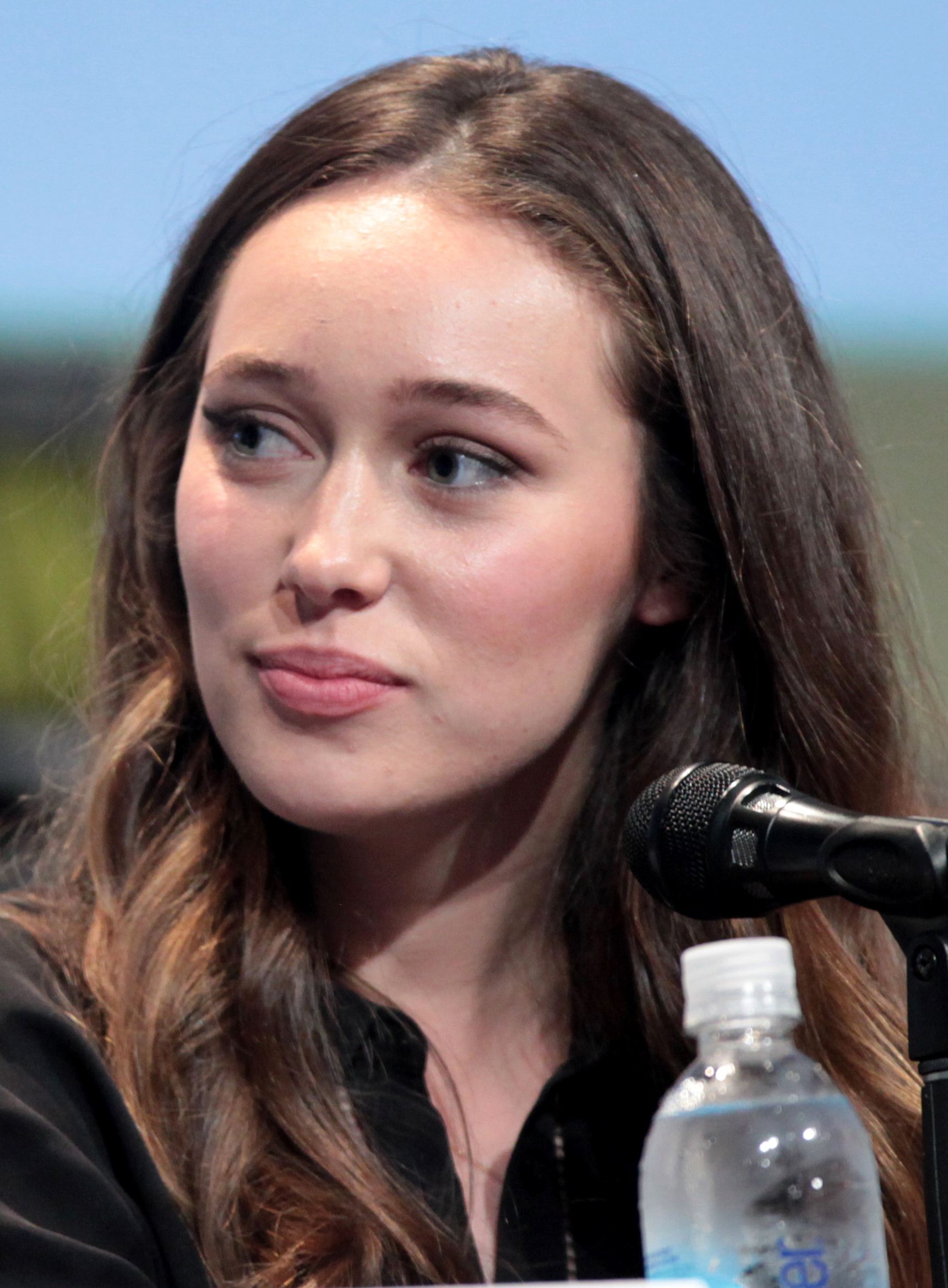
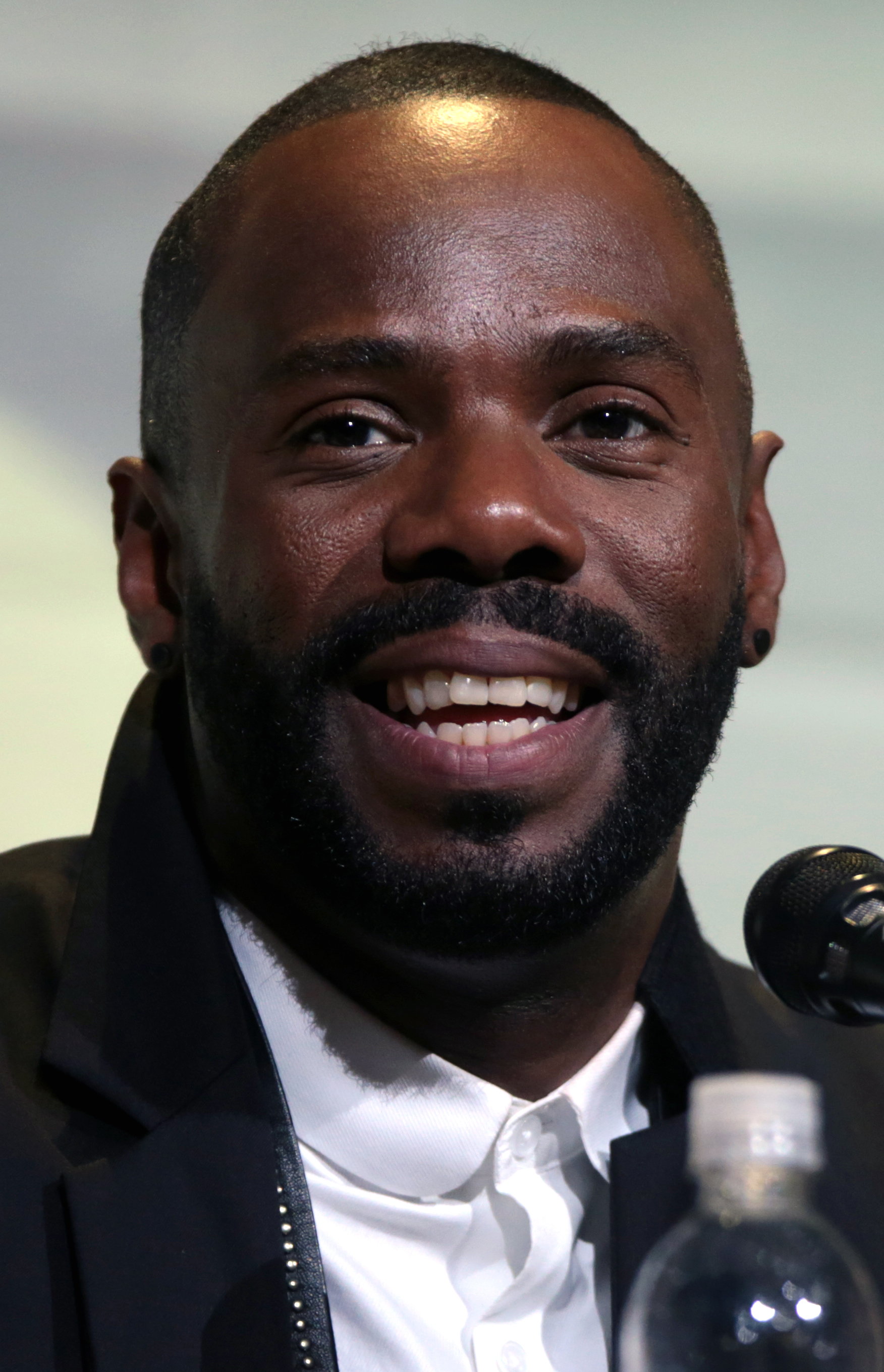
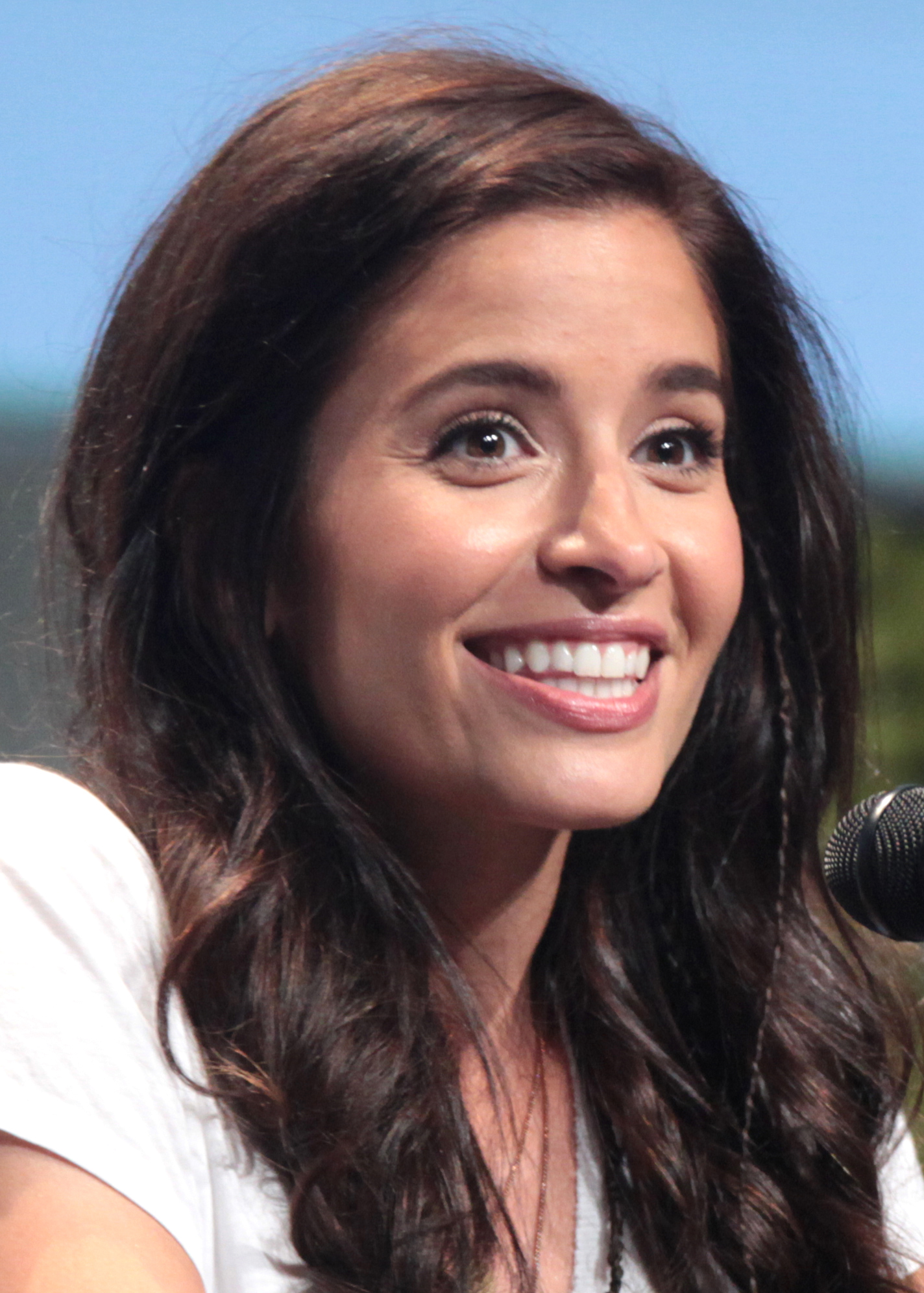
Alycia Debnam-Carey (Alicia Clark), Colman Domingo (Victor Strand) and Mercedes Mason (Ofelia Salazar)
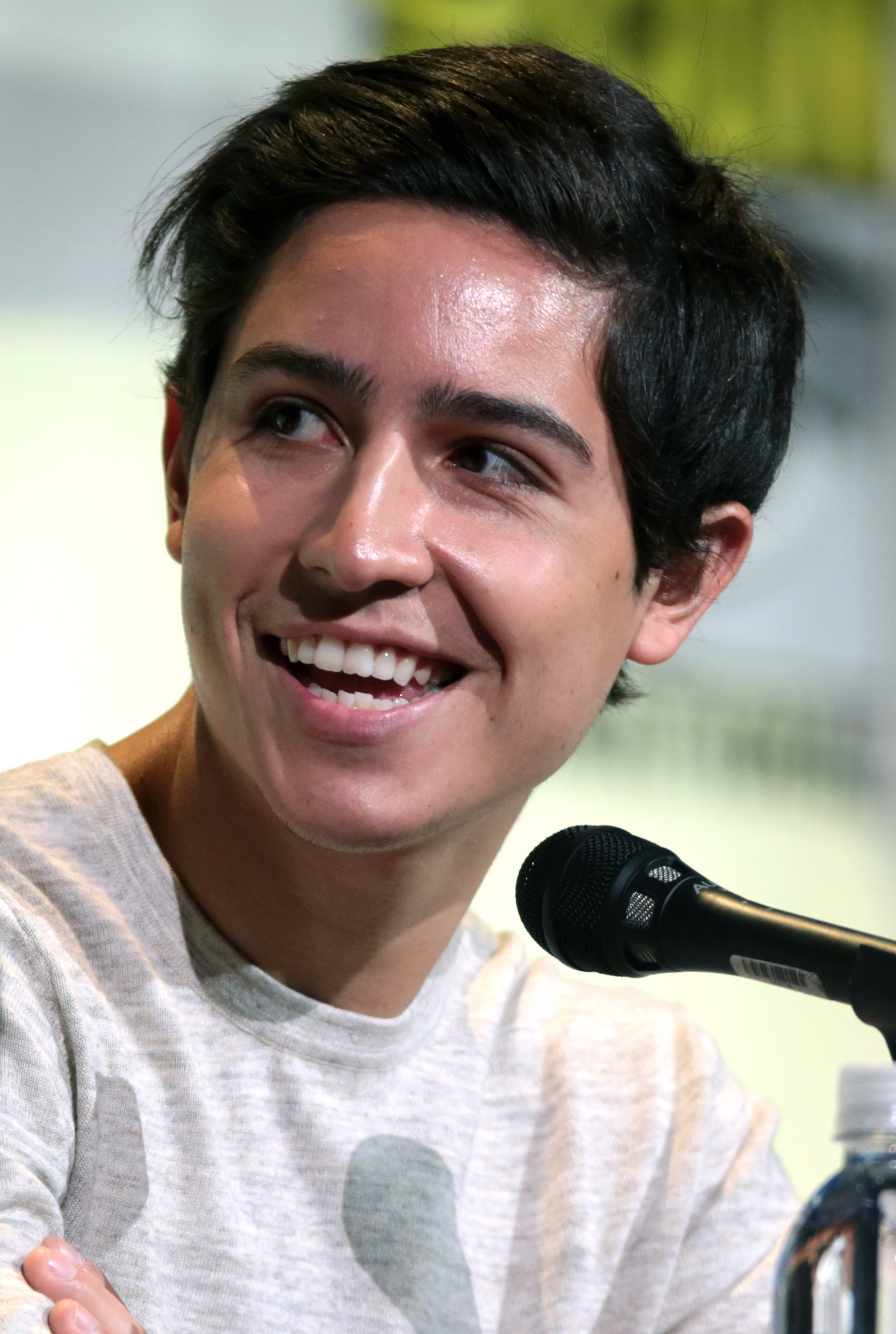
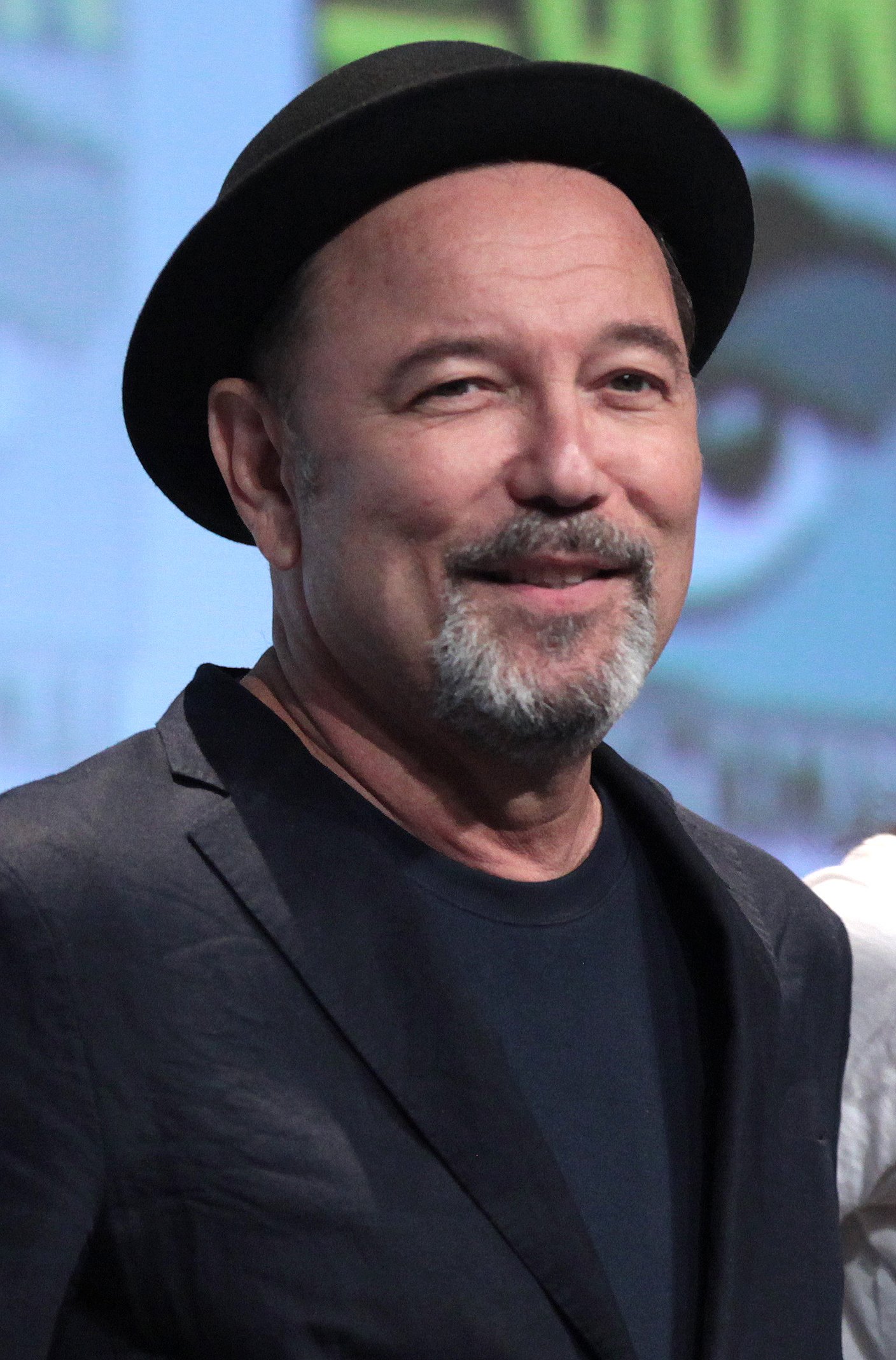
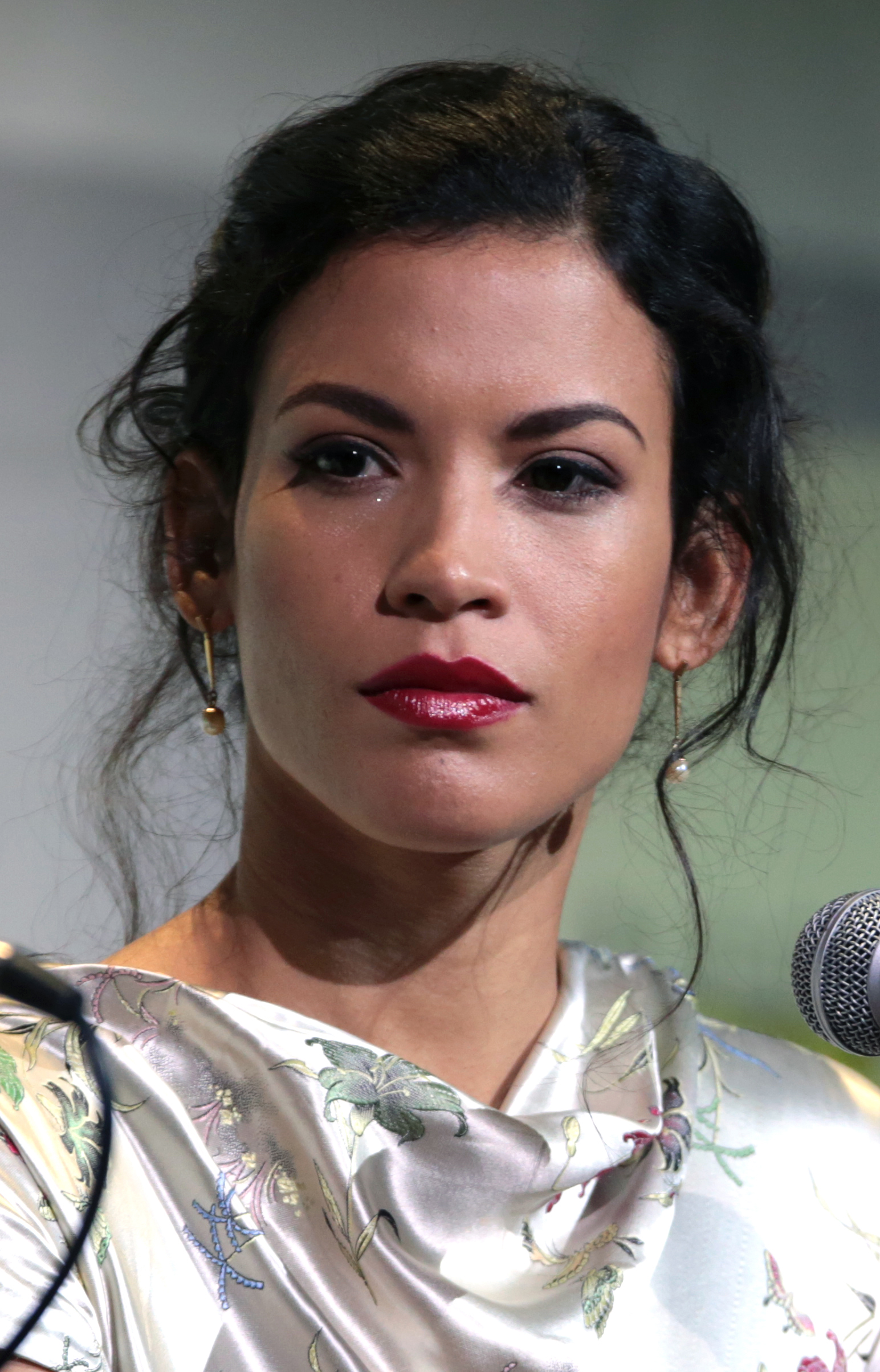
Lorenzo James Henrie (Chris Manawa), Rubén Blades (Daniel Salazar) and Danay García (Luciana Galvez)

=== Main cast ===
The second season features nine actors receiving main cast billing status, with seven returning from the first season; eight are listed as main cast members in the first season, while one new cast member is introduced. Colman Domingo was promoted from guest status and Michelle Ang was added to the main cast as Alex, however she only appears in two episodes.

- Kim Dickens as Madison Clark: An intelligent and domineering high school guidance counselor, the mother of Nick and Alicia, and Travis's fiancée.
- Cliff Curtis as Travis Manawa: A resolute and peacekeeping high school teacher, Madison's fiancé, Chris's father, and Liza's ex-husband.
- Frank Dillane as Nick Clark: A brave and selfless recovering heroin addict, Madison's son, and Alicia's brother.
- Alycia Debnam-Carey as Alicia Clark: The fiery yet compassionate daughter of Madison, and the sister of Nick.
- Colman Domingo as Victor Strand: A smart and sophisticated conman-turned-businessman, who forms friendships with Nick and Madison.
- Mercedes Mason as Ofelia Salazar: The strong-willed and very capable daughter of Daniel and his wife Griselda.
- Lorenzo James Henrie as Chris Manawa: Travis and Liza's rebellious teenage son, who becomes more brutal due to the landscape of the deadly new world.
- Rubén Blades as Daniel Salazar: A courageous and practical former Sombra Negra member, a barber, Griselda's husband, and Ofelia's father.
- Michelle Ang as Alex: A pragmatic and quiet survivor introduced in Fear the Walking Dead: Flight 462 web series.

=== Supporting cast ===
- Daniel Zovatto as Jack Kipling: A member of the pirates who develops an attraction to Alicia.
- Arturo Del Puerto as Luis Flores: An ally and right-hand man of Victor Strand and Thomas Abigail.
- Marlene Forte as Celia Flores: Luis's mother.
- Danay García as Luciana Galvez: A member of the La Colonia community in Tijuana, México, who helps Nick and believes that the walkers are not a bad thing.
- Paul Calderón as Alejandro Nuñez: A pharmacist and leader of La Colonia, a community in Tijuana, Mexico, he claims to have been bitten, but did not die/turn.
- Alejandro Edda as Marco Rodriguez: The leader of Los Hermanos, a gang who operate near La Colonia.
- Karen Bethzabe as Elena Reyes: The Rosario Beach hotel manager who helps Alicia.
- Ramses Jimenez as Hector Reyes: Elena's nephew who used to manage the hotel with her.
- Andres Londono as Oscar Diaz: The leader of a group of survivors living at a hotel.
- Raul Casso as Andrés Diaz: Oscar's brother.
- Brenda Strong as Ilene Stowe: A member of the wedding party and mother-in-law of Oscar.
- Kelly Blatz as Brandon Luke: The leader of a group of young men that befriend Chris.
- Kenny Wormald as Derek: A member of Brandon's group.

=== Guest ===
- Elizabeth Rodriguez as Liza Ortiz: A no-nonsense and caring nursing student, Travis's ex-wife, and Chris's mother, died in the previous season but seen as a corpse in the premiere.
- David Warshofsky as George Geary: A weathered survivor intent on keeping his family safe on Catrina Island.
- Catherine Dent as Melissa Geary: The loyal and cautious wife of George and mother of their three children.
- Brendan Meyer as Jake Powell: An injured survivor who owes his life to Alex. Meyer had previously starred in Fear the Walking Dead: Flight 462.
- Mark Kelly as Connor: The antagonistic leader of a group of pirates and Reed's brother.
- Jesse McCartney as Reed: Connor's brother and a hostile member of the pirates.
- Veronica Diaz as Vida: A pregnant woman and one of Connor's pirates.
- Dougray Scott as Thomas Abigail: Strand's boyfriend and the namesake of the boat Abigail.
- Patricia Reyes Spíndola as Griselda Salazar: Ofelia's mother, who emigrated from El Salvador with her husband Daniel to escape political unrest, appears as a hallucination.
- Israel Broussard as James McCallister: A member of Brandon's group.
- Rubén Carbajal as Antonio Reyes: A recent recruit to Los Hermanos and Hector's brother.
- Dayton Callie as Jeremiah Otto: A mysterious man who owns a ranch near the border where he encounters an injured Ofelia.

== Episodes ==
No. overall	No. in season	Title	Directed by	Written by	Original release date	U.S. viewers (millions)
7	1	"Monster"	Adam Davidson	Dave Erickson	April 10, 2016	6.67
The group evacuates to the Abigail as the military bombs Los Angeles, in an attempt to contain the outbreak. Out at sea, the group comes across another boat full of survivors, but Strand refuses to pick them up. Strand informs the group they are heading to San Diego. Alicia mans the radio, only to hear distress calls, and she strikes up a conversation with another seaborne survivor named Jack. Travis notices Chris and Daniel bonding over their losses. Madison becomes concerned at how Strand refuses to sleep, and Daniel tells her he is suspicious of Strand's motives. Once they are far enough out to sea, the group holds a funeral for Liza and buries her at sea. However, Chris reacts violently and blames Travis for her death. Alicia learns from Jack that his boat is sinking, and he asks for help. Strand rejects her plan to help Jack and threatens to throw overboard anyone who disobeys him. As the group prepares for dinner, Chris leaps overboard, and Nick joins him, only to find walkers floating in the water from a capsized ship sunk by gunfire. Nick recovers the ship's logs, but Strand warns that another ship is fast approaching them, most likely a hostile ship.
8	2	"We All Fall Down"	Adam Davidson	Story by : Brett C. Leonard & Kate Barnow; Teleplay by : Kate Barnow	April 17, 2016	5.58
The group docks on a nearby island to escape pursuit of the unknown ship. Daniel and Ofelia stay behind on the boat to keep an eye on Strand, while Travis and the others investigate a house on the shore, which is inhabited by a family. Inside the house, George informs the group that every major city on the West Coast, including San Diego, has been burned down by the military. The next morning, Travis and his family help George with daily tasks, such as eliminating walkers that wash up on shore and building fences to keep them out. George's wife Melissa privately requests that Madison take her children with them when they leave the island. Meanwhile, Daniel breaks into Strand's quarters and finds a submachine gun and a map leading to Strand's true destination: Mexico. Nick warns Travis and Madison that he suspects George is planning to poison his entire family as part of a suicide pact. Travis and Madison try to take George's two younger children, but one of them prematurely ingests some of the poison and turns, killing their mother. The group tries to flee with the remaining child, but George's older son stops them, and they are forced to leave the remains of George's family behind on the island.
9	3	"Ouroboros"	Stefan Schwartz	Alan Page	April 24, 2016	4.73
While Travis repairs the boat, Madison confronts Strand about his destination, which Daniel has discovered to be Baja California, Mexico. Nick, Alicia, Chris, and Daniel go ashore to scavenge supplies from a plane crash, and where Chris finds a survivor. Unfortunately, the man is severely injured and Chris must take action to put the man out of his pain. Strand promises the group on the Abigail that he has a safe place in Baja with supplies. A herd of walkers attacks the beach party, but the group make their escape, with two plane survivors: Alex and Jake. Nick finds a new tactic to appear as one of the dead, covering himself in their blood. After debating whether or not to take the new survivors aboard, they compromise by towing the two crash survivors in their life raft – until Strand severs the tow line.
10	4	"Blood in the Streets"	Michael Uppendahl	Kate Erickson	May 1, 2016	4.80
Nick goes ashore to find Strand's contact in Mexico. The group allows a family in distress to board, and they turn out to be allied with Jack, the boy Alicia had communicated with on the radio. The newcomers end up taking over the ship, and Strand tries to leave by raft, but the raft is shot while he's escaping and it begins to slowly sink. When the leader of the group arrives, he takes Alicia and Travis with him and leaves other members of his pirate group behind, to bring the yacht to shore. Through flashbacks, we learn more about Strand and his reason for going to Baja. When Nick and Luis, Strand's contact, head back to the Abigail, they are able to help the group get free, and they take one hostage, who is gravely injured. Madison is able to rescue Strand from the water and takes him back to the Abigail.
11	5	"Captive"	Craig Zisk	Carla Ching	May 8, 2016	4.41
The group plans to use the hostage as bait to get back Travis and Alicia. Alicia attempts to befriend Jack and find her way home on her own, while Travis is locked in a cell. Chris is left to watch over the hostage and he ends up shooting him in the face, killing him. He tells Madison the boy was turning, but she is worried that he is becoming unhinged. Travis sees Alex with Jack's group, and she admits to him that she gave up information on them when she was found. Madison is able to obtain Travis's release, by trading him for the now turned brother of the leader, and they escape in the mayhem. Alicia breaks free from Jack, and goes with Travis and Madison back to the yacht.
12	6	"Sicut Cervus"	Kate Dennis	Brian Buckner	May 15, 2016	4.49
Strand arranges for payment to the Mexican military for safe passage, but a gunfight ensues leaving two officers and Luis, Strand's contact, dead. While walking to the compound, the group is attacked by the dead and Madison is knocked to the ground while Chris stands by watching, which Alicia sees, before killing Madison's attacker. The group arrives at the compound, and are greeted by Luis's mother Celia who tells them they can stay but must leave their weapons outside. Strand finds that Thomas has been bitten and is dying. Alicia tells Chris what she saw regarding Madison's attack. Nick and Celia form a bond and she talks to him about her view of the dead and says it is just a new beginning, not the end. Madison, now aware of what Chris did, tells Travis she thinks he isn't well. They argue about her inability to want to help Chris, when Travis was always willing to help Nick. Daniel discovers that Celia is keeping the compound's dead family members in the cellar. Madison decides to sleep with Alicia that night to provide comfort and they are woken by a gunshot to find Chris standing over them, holding a knife and they chase him from the room. Strand shoots Thomas in the head.
13	7	"Shiva"	Andrew Bernstein	David Wiener	May 22, 2016	4.39
After Strand kills Thomas, Celia is furious and demands that Strand and the group leave. Chris has run off and Travis goes off after him. Daniel begins to have nightmares and act strangely. When he attacks one of Celia's men, Celia has Daniel taken to the cellar. Nick brings Celia's walker son Luis to her and because of this, she lets the group stay, but Strand must leave. Madison talks to Nick about his fascination with the dead and is frustrated by his feelings for Celia. Nick goes to find Travis and Chris, but when he finds them, Travis says he and Chris aren't coming back and he needs to help Chris. He asks Nick to tell Madison he couldn't find them. Celia takes Madison to the cellar to show her the dead, but Madison locks her inside the cell. Daniel is able to attack one of the compound workers and escape. He then goes to where the dead are held and sets the place on fire after seeing visions of his wife and those he's killed. Daniel does not escape the burning building. Strand returns to the compound to help the rest of the group escape the fire, but when Madison sees Nick, he tells her that he couldn't find Travis and he isn't going with them because Celia was right about the group destroying everything in their path, and he no longer wants to be a part of it.
14	8	"Grotesque"	Daniel Sackheim	Kate Barnow	August 21, 2016	3.86
Nick wanders off on his own and tries to scavenge abandoned cars for supplies, he is attacked by bandits and gets lost in the wilderness as he flees. When he tries to get some sleep, he is attacked by a pair of feral dogs and bitten in the leg. However, Nick is saved when a pack of walkers arrives and devours the dogs. The walkers are then drawn away by the sounds of car horns and gunfire, giving Nick an opportunity to escape. He then blends in with the walker pack as it makes its way to Tijuana. The previous group of bandits then arrives and begins to kill the walkers, but one of them flees when the other two are eaten. Nick eventually passes out due to his wound and malnourishment. A group of survivors observe Nick, but their leader, Luciana, opts not to help him. During this ordeal, Nick has several flashbacks to his time with his girlfriend in rehab for their drug addictions. Nick then regains consciousness and manages to limp his way to Tijuana. He encounters Luciana's group, who take him to their community to be treated.
15	9	"Los Muertos"	Deborah Chow	Alan Page	August 28, 2016	3.66
Nick is shocked to see Luciana's people banish an infected man, where he voluntarily allows himself to be eaten by walkers. Luciana explains that those who are infected or terminally ill sacrifice themselves to help build the "Wall", a barrier of walkers meant to protect the community from outside threats. Nick then accompanies Luciana on a supply run to a nearby supermarket, which is controlled by an armed gang. Nick is caught trying to shoplift, but he manages to bargain for his life and more supplies by threatening to cut off the supply of medicine the community has been trading with the gang. Luciana scolds Nick for his recklessness, as now the gang will be interested in finding out where her community is. Nick is then brought before the community's leader, Alejandro, who explains to Nick that he keeps the community together by preaching that the undead plague is merely a test from God. Meanwhile, Madison, Strand, Alicia, and Ofelia flee Celia's burning estate, intending to get back to the Abigail. However, they find out that the Abigail has been stolen, and are forced to scavenge a nearby hotel for supplies. While Alicia and Ofelia search the rooms, the two momentarily decide to clean up. After Alicia returns from taking a shower, she comes to realise that Ofelia has taken off. Meanwhile, Madison and Strand get drunk in the bar as they express their various frustration with life. However, a large horde of walkers attack the hotel, trapping all four inside.
16	10	"Do Not Disturb"	Michael McDonough	Lauren Signorino	September 4, 2016	2.99
A flashback shows the Mexican hotel hosting a wedding when the father of the bride dies from a heart attack and turns. Elena, the hotel manager, locks all of the guests in the ballroom in an attempt to contain the outbreak. In the present, Alicia manages to escape the walkers on her floor, and meets Elena, who agrees to help her find Madison and Strand. They reach the ground floor of the hotel, where they are confronted by the surviving hotel guests. They demand Elena's keys to the hotel in return for safe passage and her nephew. Elena gives them the keys, but they are pursued by the infected. Alicia and Elena take shelter in a locked room, where they reunite with Madison and Strand. Meanwhile, Travis and Chris travel the Mexican countryside. Unknown to Travis, Chris steals supplies from another survivor group. Travis teaches Chris how to drive. When they make camp at night, they are confronted by the group that Chris stole from, who reveal themselves to be Americans who were on spring break when the outbreak hit. They are interested in recruiting Travis and Chris into their group; Chris takes a liking to them, but Travis does not trust them. The next day, they stop at a farm to scavenge supplies and are confronted by the farmer who lives there. The farmer shoots one of the tourists in the leg, prompting Chris to shoot and kill the farmer, much to Travis's horror.
17	11	"Pablo & Jessica"	Uta Briesewitz	Kate Erickson	September 11, 2016	3.40
In order to preserve their dwindling medicine supplies, Nick proposes to Alejandro that they trick the bandits they promised to trade medicine to by secretly diluting it with powdered milk, protecting their own supply. Alejandro is impressed with Nick's ingenuity and accepts him fully into his community by giving him his own house. He also confirms to Nick that he had been bitten by a walker and somehow did not turn. However, one of the community's scouts returns and reports that Luciana's brother Pablo has been killed. Luciana is shocked at the news and is comforted by Nick. Later that night, Luciana visits Nick, and they both begin to kiss. Back at the hotel, Madison and Strand meet with Oscar, the leader of the hotel survivors, and manage to negotiate a truce with him. Madison, Strand, Alicia, and other survivors then begin the job of clearing the hotel of infected. Alicia comes up with the idea of luring all of the infected into the sea, where the riptide current will carry them away. The plan is successful, and the survivors celebrate. Strand then goes to talk privately with Oscar, who is still mourning the death of his wife (the titular Jessica). Strand comforts Oscar and convinces him to finally let his wife go. Oscar gives Strand the key to the hotel room his infected wife is imprisoned in, and Strand enters to finish her off.
18	12	"Pillar of Salt"	Gerardo Naranjo	Carla Ching	September 18, 2016	3.62
Ofelia, having escaped the hotel, goes out on her own and heads back to the United States. With the infected removed from the hotel grounds, the hotel survivors begin fortifying and repairing the building. However, Strand is stabbed by Ilene the mother of Oscar's wife Jessica, fortunately the wound is not serious. Madison and Elena head to Tijuana to obtain the medicine. In Tijuana, Nick and Luciana are awoken by news that one of the community's scouts, Francisco, has deserted with his family. With the community losing scouts at an increasing rate, Alejandro is worried the community might collapse, and forbids anybody from leaving, even for supply runs. Nick is concerned since they were supposed to trade their medicine to the bandits, who will most likely attack the community if they don't get what they want. At the bandit warehouse, Madison and Elena arrive to trade, where she overhears the bandits interrogating Francisco. Madison overhears them describe Nick's appearance and tries to find out where he is with no success. Nick patrols the perimeter and spots the bandits scouting the community from a distance. Upon returning to the hotel, Madison turns on the hotel lights against everybody's wishes in hopes of attracting Nick's attention, though Alicia convinces her to respect Nick's decision to choose death over their family. Madison shuts off the lights, but not before Travis, now alone, sees them.
19	13	"Date of Death"	Christoph Schrewe	Brian Buckner	September 25, 2016	3.49
The next morning, survivors who had seen the hotel's lights come on begin to flock to the hotel gates, but the hotel survivors refuse to let them enter. Madison then spots Travis among the crowd and lets him inside. Back in the past, Travis begins to treat the wounded tourist James's wounded leg and buries the dead farmer. That night, Travis tries to warn Chris not to associate with the tourists, but Chris rebuffs him. One week later, the tourists decide to leave for San Diego in spite of Travis's warnings that the city has been burned to the ground. However, James still hasn't fully recovered and cannot be moved. Fearing that James will be murdered by the others, Travis steals Chris's gun in an effort to protect him. James then tells Travis that he and his friends made a pact to ensure none of them would turn, and he was the one who mercy killed a fourth member of their group. He believes his friends, who think he's dying, will kill him under the misguided belief that it will be a mercy killing as well. Chris arrives to deliver food, but it turns out to be a trick when the other two tourists ambush Travis and execute James. Travis tries one last time to convince Chris to come with him, but Chris leaves with the remaining two tourists. Back in the present, Travis laments to Madison how he failed to take care of Chris, and regrets that he never told him he loved him before parting ways. Madison then talks with Alicia and reveals to her that her father's car crash was not accidental, but suicide and reiterates her love for her. Afterwards, Madison sees that the survivor group at the start of the episode have been allowed into the hotel compound, with them being checked to see if they're healthy or sick. Later that night, a new group of survivors arrive at the hotel, among them the two tourists.
20	14	"Wrath"	Stefan Schwartz	Kate Barnow	October 2, 2016	3.67
Ofelia manages to successfully reach the American border. In Tijuana, Nick attempts to convince the bandits not to attack the community, but their leader, Marco, explains to him that he knows how they get in and out of the Colonia, using the walkers as their army, and leaves him with an ultimatum: abandon the community or he and his men will slaughter everybody. To demonstrate his resolve, Marco shows Nick the executed corpses of Francisco and his family. Nick then returns and warns Luciana about the impending attack and asks her to leave with him. However, Luciana is still adamant in Alejandro's ability to protect them. Frustrated, Nick forces Alejandro to admit that he's not actually immune to the infection, and that he had been using his medical experience to merely suppress the symptoms. At the hotel, the tourists are let in, and Madison recognizes them based on Travis's description. The tourists anger the rest of the refugees and are about to be thrown out of the hotel when Travis stops them and asks what happened to Chris. The tourists explain that Chris accidentally crashed their truck and was killed by the impact. However, several inconsistencies in their stories lead Travis to conclude that Chris was only injured in the crash and was killed by the tourists. Enraged, Travis beats the tourists to death and severely injures Oscar who tries to stop him.
21	15	"North"	Andrew Bernstein	Dave Erickson	October 2, 2016	3.05
In the community, Alejandro refuses to back down and orders the community members to prepare to defend their homes against the bandits. Not wanting to get caught in the fighting, Nick notices a helicopter landing at a town on the American side of the border. He returns to convince Alejandro to evacuate the community. The next day, when Marco and his bandits arrive, they find the community seemingly abandoned. However, unknown to them, a terminally ill Alejandro breaks open the community's improvised gate, allowing the infected to enter and forcing Marco and his men to flee. Nick and Luciana lead their group out of the colony and towards the border. At the hotel, Oscar suffers a severe head injury due to Travis and is taken to be treated. Since Travis violated the rule of no violence against other survivors, Madison is reluctant to have Travis exiled but ultimately agrees to go with him the next morning. Oscar dies from his head injury. Enraged, several of the hotel survivors break into Travis's room and attack him, forcing Alicia to kill one of them to save his life. Travis, Madison, and Alicia are forced to flee the hotel while Strand decides to stay behind after intervening to help them escape. They return to the bandits' supermarket and find the entire building abandoned, and Alicia questions Madison's motives when she starts searching bodies of Francisco and his family for clues to find Nick. They arrive at the community and find that Marco and his men have been killed by the infected. Alicia finds a dying Alejandro, and his last words instruct them to look for Nick at the border. Meanwhile, as Nick and Luciana lead their group across the border, they catch sight of the helicopter again before they are suddenly attacked by another armed group. The survivors flee, but Nick and Luciana are captured.

== Reception ==
=== Critical response ===
The second season received mostly mixed reviews from critics. On Rotten Tomatoes, the season has a rating of 70%, based on 223 reviews, whose average rating is 6.6/10. The site's critical consensus reads, "Fear the Walking Dead sets sail in its sophomore season with an intriguing backdrop that doesn't always disguise its deficiencies in comparison to its predecessor." On Metacritic, the season has a score of 54 out of 100, based on 12 critics, indicating "mixed or average" reviews.

Fear the Walking Dead season 2: Critical reception by episode
Season 2 (2016): Percentage of positive critics' reviews tracked by the website Rotten Tomatoes

=== Ratings ===
Viewership and ratings per episode of Fear the Walking Dead season 2
No.	Title	Air date	Rating (18–49)	Viewers (millions)	DVR (18–49)	DVR viewers (millions)	Total (18–49)	Total viewers (millions)
1	"Monster"	April 10, 2016	3.1	6.67	1.4	—N/a	4.5	—N/a
2	"We All Fall Down"	April 17, 2016	2.5	5.58	1.2	2.20	3.7	7.78
3	"Ouroboros"	April 24, 2016	2.1	4.73	1.4	2.61	3.5	7.34
4	"Blood in the Streets"	May 1, 2016	2.1	4.80	1.3	2.51	3.4	7.31
5	"Captive"	May 8, 2016	2.0	4.41	1.5	—N/a	3.4	—N/a
6	"Sicut Cervus"	May 15, 2016	1.9	4.49	1.4	2.74	3.3	7.23
7	"Shiva"	May 22, 2016	1.9	4.39	—N/a	—N/a	—N/a	—N/a
8	"Grotesque"	August 21, 2016	1.6	3.86	1.1	—N/a	2.7	—N/a
9	"Los Muertos"	August 28, 2016	1.6	3.66	2.3	—N/a	3.9	—N/a
10	"Do Not Disturb"	September 4, 2016	1.2	2.99	2.4	—N/a	3.6	—N/a
11	"Pablo & Jessica"	September 11, 2016	1.5	3.40	—N/a	—N/a	—N/a	—N/a
12	"Pillar of Salt"	September 18, 2016	1.6	3.62	—N/a	—N/a	—N/a	—N/a
13	"Date of Death"	September 25, 2016	1.5	3.49	—N/a	—N/a	—N/a	—N/a
14	"Wrath"	October 2, 2016	1.6	3.67	—N/a	—N/a	—N/a	—N/a
15	"North"	October 2, 2016	1.3	3.05	—N/a	—N/a	—N/a	—N/a

== Home media ==
The second season, featuring audio commentaries, deleted scenes, actor interviews and various behind-the-scene featurettes, was released on Blu-ray and DVD on December 13, 2016.
