= Blood in the Streets =

- Fear the Walking Dead episode
- Episode no.: Season 2 Episode 4
- Directed by: Michael Uppendahl
- Written by: Kate Erickson
- Original air date: May 1, 2016
- Running time: 44 minutes

Guest appearances
- Dougray Scott as Thomas Abigail; Veronica Diaz as Vida; Marlene Forté as Celia Flores; Mark Kelly as Connor; Jesse McCartney as Reed; Arturo Del Puerto as Luis Flores; Daniel Zovatto as Jack Kipling

Episode chronology
← Previous "Ouroboros"	Next → "Captive"
- Fear the Walking Dead (season 2)

"Blood in the Streets" is the fourth episode of the second season, and the 10th episode overall of the post-apocalyptic horror television series Fear the Walking Dead, which aired on AMC on May 1, 2016.

== Plot ==
Late at night, Nick jumps overboard and swims ashore, where he evades numerous undead and the military in order to meet with Strand's contact, Luis, who will help the group enter Mexico. The two of them travel to a beach where they board a zodiac and depart to meet with the Abigail. The next morning, aboard the Abigail, a family in distress arrives on a small life raft, which the group allows to board. Upon boarding, the newcomers are discovered to be the group of Jack, the boy that Alicia had spoken to on the radio. The newcomers suddenly attack the Abigail group and seize control of the vessel; Strand manages to escape using a life raft, but the raft is damaged during his escape and begins to slowly sink. One of the newcomers, Reed, holds Travis at gunpoint and demands that he hotwire the Abigail, since Strand had the only keys, while the rest of the group remains tied up as they await the arrival of the group's leader, Connor.

As they wait, Jack apologizes to Alicia for having misled her, and offers to bring her back to his group's base, assuring that her family will remain unharmed and she will be able to live comfortably, though she is reluctant to accept the offer. When Connor arrives, he instructs the rest of his group to bring the Abigail back to their base, where he will meet them; he forces Alicia and Travis to travel with him, though Jack assures Alicia that his group will drop off her family ashore unharmed. Connor and Jack depart with the two hostages, while Reed and two other members prepare to bring the Abigail to the base to meet with them. Shortly afterward, Nick and Luis arrive aboard the zodiac. They are able to incapacitate the pirates, killing two of them and gravely injuring Reed, who they take as a hostage. They free the rest of their group, and Madison is able to rescue Strand using the Abigail's launch boat; she takes him back to the Abigail and treats his injuries.

Through a series of flashbacks, more information is revealed about Strand's backstory. Prior to the apocalypse, he was a real estate investor who lost much of his money during Hurricane Katrina. While staying at a hotel, he met another investor, Thomas, and the two of them began a relationship together. It was through Thomas that he met Luis, who became a trusted friend as well. Strand and Thomas lived in a house in Baja, and Strand had traveled to Los Angeles for business when the outbreak began and he was apprehended by National Guard troops; his subsequent actions have all been centered around his plans to reunite with Thomas in Baja.

== Reception ==
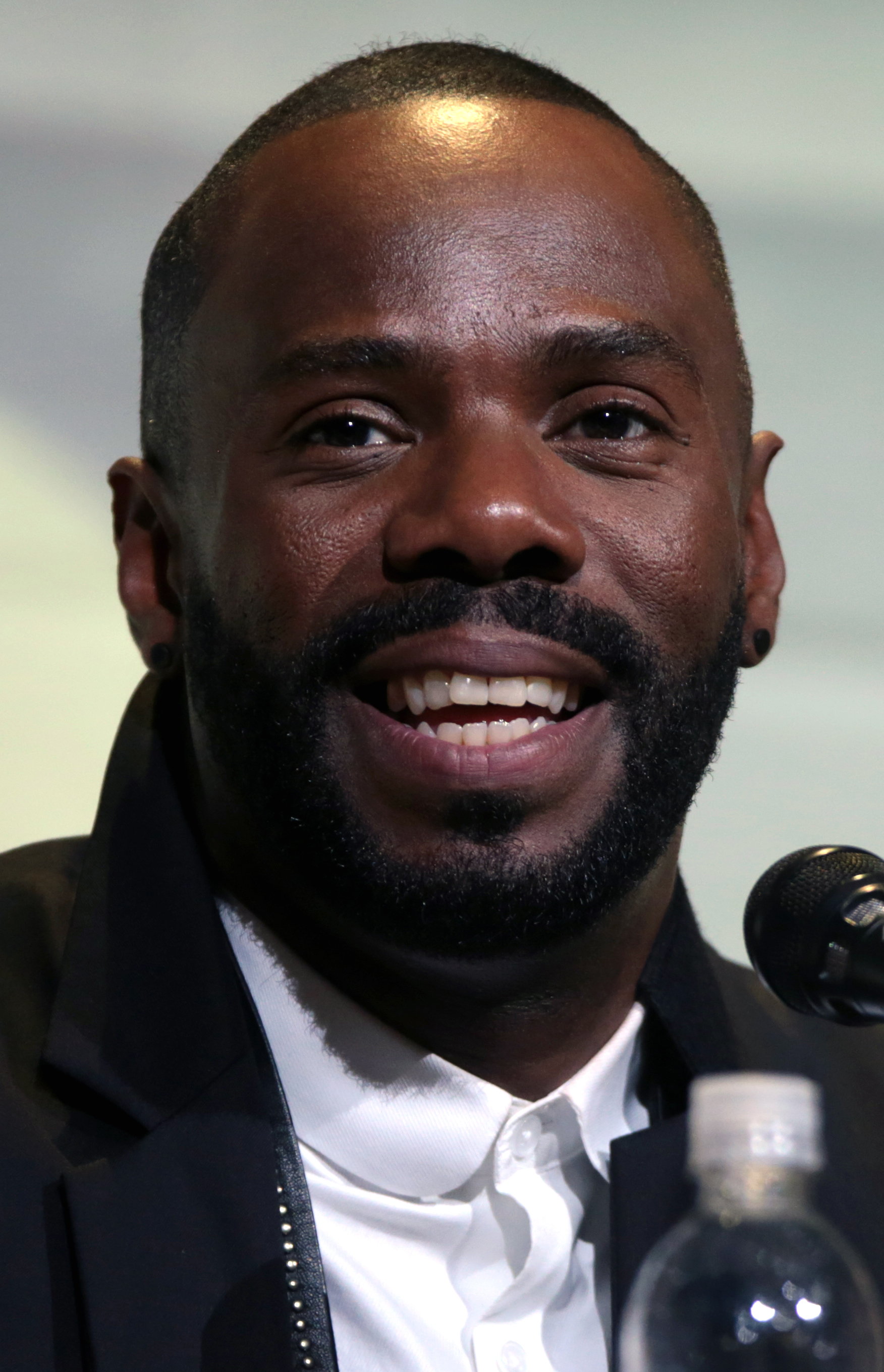
The character development of Victor Strand (Colman Domingo) was praised by critics.

"Blood in the Streets" received critical acclaim from critics. On Rotten Tomatoes, it garnered a 91% rating with an average score of 7.22/10 based on 11 reviews. The site consensus reads: "'Blood in the Streets' finally sheds some light on the enigmatic Victor Strand as it ups the interpersonal stakes and high seas thrills."

Matt Fowler of IGN gave "Blood in the Streets" an 8.3/10 rating stating: "'Blood in the Streets' brought our main characters together in a time of cramped, confined crisis. And with no room for squabbling between them, they came out in full force, both physically and psychologically to win the day (though Alicia being taken is still an issue). And in the show's first ever experiment with flashbacks, Strand was given a great background arc."

Simon Abrams of Vulture praised of development of Domingo and wrote: "Series writer Kate Erickson handles the Jack problem in an admirably curt fashion in "Blood on the Streets," an episode that juxtaposes his group of business-minded pirates with Victor Strand and his mysterious patron, Thomas Abigail".

Danette Chavez writing for The A.V. Club praised the episode with a qualification of B and in her review said: "Blood In The Streets" "reveals almost all about Victor Strand, except of course, his fate".

=== Ratings ===
"Blood in the Streets" was seen by 4.80 million viewers in the United States on its original air date, slightly above the previous episodes rating of 4.73 million.
