= We All Fall Down (Fear the Walking Dead) =

- Fear the Walking Dead episode
- Episode no.: Season 2 Episode 2
- Directed by: Adam Davidson
- Story by: Brett C. Leonard; Kate Barnow
- Teleplay by: Kate Barnow
- Original air date: April 17, 2016
- Running time: 44 minutes

Guest appearances
- Catherine Dent as Melissa Geary; David Warshofsky as George Geary; Jeremiah Clayton as Harry Geary; Maverick Clayton as Harry Geary; Aria Lyric Leabu as Willa Geary; Jake Austin Walker as Seth Geary

Episode chronology
← Previous "Monster"	Next → "Ouroboros"
- Fear the Walking Dead (season 2)

"We All Fall Down" is the second episode of the second season, and the 8th episode overall of the post-apocalyptic horror television series Fear the Walking Dead, which aired on AMC on April 17, 2016.

== Plot ==
As the Abigail is pursued by an unknown hostile vessel, Nick reviews the logbook that he collected from the capsized sailboat, where he reads that the crew of the vessel came from San Diego, which was firebombed by the military. He tells this to Strand, who previously planned on traveling to San Diego, but Strand remains skeptical. In an attempt to hide from the hostile vessel's radar, the Abigail docks on a nearby island. As they approach the island, they notice a light flashing on and off in a house near the docks. Daniel and Ofelia stay behind on the boat to keep an eye on Strand, whose intentions Daniel remains suspicious of, while Travis and the others investigate the house, which they discover to be inhabited by a man named George Geary, along with his wife Melissa and children Willa, Harry, and Seth.

Inside the house, George informs the group that every major city on the west coast has been burned down by the military in an attempt to contain the outbreak, confirming what Nick had read in the logbook. The next morning, Travis and his family help George with daily chores, such as eliminating undead that wash up on shore and repairing fences to keep them out. Later that evening, Melissa privately reveals to Madison that she turned the light on and off the day before in an attempt to get the Abigail's attention, and she requests that Madison's group take Willa and Harry with them when they leave, as she believes there is no future for them on the island. Madison is surprised but begins to consider the offer, though Travis is initially opposed to the idea.

Meanwhile, back aboard the Abigail, Daniel breaks into Strand's quarters, where he finds a submachine gun and a map leading to a small community in Baja, Mexico, which he suspects is Strand's true destination. Inside of the Gearys' house, Nick accidentally discovers a container of pills that he believes to be poisonous; he warns Travis and Madison that he suspects George is planning to kill his entire family as part of a suicide pact. This convinces Travis that they should oblige Melissa's request and take the two younger children with them, but this plan is interrupted when they discover that Willa had found and ingested some of the poison, accidentally killing herself and causing her to reanimate and attack Melissa. The group tries to flee with Harry, but as they board the Abigail, George's oldest son, Seth, arrives and threatens them at gunpoint, demanding that they return Harry. They reluctantly do so, and they leave the island that night when Strand determines that the hostile vessel has left the area.

== Reception ==
"We All Fall Down" received positive reviews from critics. On Rotten Tomatoes, it garnered a 79% rating with an average score of 7.04/10 based on 14 reviews. The site consensus reads: "'We All Fall Down' adds complexity to Fear the Walking Dead's characters as well as its narrative arc, backing up a deliberately paced plot with enough teasing mystery to lure viewers into the next episode."

Matt Fowler of IGN gave "We All Fall Down" a 6.8/10 rating stating: "'We All Fall Down' took our heroes to shore, as if the sea itself were the open road, filled with roadblocks and pit stops. It's a cool concept. As was the idea of a mirror family. A tight-knit clan all about self-reliance and dying together. But, like the premiere, flat scenes and rotten character choices weighed this one down too."

=== Ratings ===
"We All Fall Down" was seen by 5.58 million viewers in the United States on its original air date, below the season premiers rating of 6.67 million by over a million.
