= Shiva (Fear the Walking Dead) =

- Fear the Walking Dead episode
- Episode no.: Season 2 Episode 7
- Directed by: Andrew Bernstein
- Written by: David Wiener
- Original air date: May 22, 2016
- Running time: 43 minutes

Guest appearances
- Marlene Forté as Celia Flores; Jorge-Luis Pallo as Javier; Arturo Del Puerto as Luis Flores; Daniel Zovatto as Jack Kipling; Patricia Reyes Spíndola as Griselda Salazar

Episode chronology
← Previous "Sicut Cervus"	Next → "Grotesque"
- Fear the Walking Dead (season 2)

"Shiva" is the seventh episode and mid-season finale of the second season, and the 13th episode overall of the post-apocalyptic horror television series Fear the Walking Dead, which aired on AMC on May 22, 2016.

This episode marks Rubén Blades' (Daniel Salazar) final appearance in season 2 as his character's fate was left ambiguous.

== Plot ==
Upon discovering that Strand has shot Thomas in the head, preventing his reanimation, an infuriated Celia demands that he and the rest of his group leave by the end of the day. After having been caught wielding a knife in Alicia and Madison's room, Chris runs off. Madison relays the events to Travis, who remains doubtful that Chris would do such a thing, and he soon begins searching for him.

Meanwhile, Daniel begins to have nightmares and hallucinations of his deceased wife, Griselda, leaving him suspicious of all the members of Celia's community. While walking with Ofelia that afternoon, he suddenly attacks one of Celia's men, prompting some of her other men to apprehend him and tie him up in the cellar, where his hallucinations worsen. Meanwhile, Nick begins to fully commit to Celia's ideology, even bringing home the reanimated corpse of her son Luis to her from the Abigail; after having done this for her, Celia says she will allow his family to stay, but not Strand, who she still wants to leave by sunset. Madison talks to Nick about his fascination with the dead and is frustrated by his growing belief for Celia's ideology.

Outside the compound, Travis discovers Chris inside the house of another survivor, where he has taken a young boy hostage and threatens to shoot the boy if Travis doesn't leave. Travis is able to disarm Chris and chases him outside of the house, before finally catching him in the road and convincing him not to run off. Chris explains that he is tired of being treated as a threat by the rest of the group, and Travis begins to suspect that it may be better not to bring him back to the others. With Travis having been gone for several hours now, Nick leaves the compound to search for him and Chris; he soon finds them, but Travis tells him that he and Chris will not be going back, as he needs to help Chris and doesn't want to endanger the others. He asks Nick to tell the others that he simply never found them, which Nick reluctantly agrees to do.

Back at the compound, Madison confronts Celia about her influence on Nick and asks her to stop, but Celia refuses. Desperate to help Nick, Madison decides she must kill Celia. She pretends to want to learn more about Celia's ideology and asks to see the undead in the cellar; Celia brings her there and opens the cage door, but Madison suddenly locks her inside the cage, before quickly leaving the cellar. Meanwhile, Daniel is able to break free of his restraints; he goes to the cellar where the dead are held, and douses the room in gasoline before lighting it on fire. He watches as Celia emerges from the horde of the undead as the building burns and collapses around them; he does not escape and is presumably killed. Strand, Ofelia, Alicia, and Madison prepare to escape the burning compound in a truck, but stop when they see Nick approaching; he tells them that he couldn't find Travis or Chris. He also says that he will not be going with them, as he believes Celia was right about the group destroying everything in their path, and he no longer wants to be a part of it. Despite Madison's protests, Strand drives the truck away from the burning compound, as Nick walks off in a different direction, leaving them.

== Reception ==
"Shiva" received positive reviews from critics. On Rotten Tomatoes, it garnered a 71% rating, with an average score of 6.47/10 based on 14 reviews. The site consensus reads, "Mid-season finale "Shiva" shakes up Fear the Walking Dead, tossing relationships into a scary and unique new climate while setting the stage for a biting cliffhanger."

Matt Fowler of IGN gave "Shiva" a 6.8/10.0 rating stating; ""Shiva" did well on the Travis/Chris front, and I liked how Madison dealt with Celia, but it seemed to want to serve the endpoint more than the characters. The fiery finish that worked to split everyone up. Because Daniel's insta-dementia felt hurried. And if that was the place this show wanted to take him, I wished they'd devoted more time to the build. Especially since Daniel was one of the few characters on the series that was easy(ish) to care about. Also, it's becoming harder and harder to get a handle on Nick and what he'll choose to do from week to week. It feels arbitrary at times."

=== Ratings ===
"Shiva" was seen by 4.39 million viewers in the United States on its original air date, below the previous episodes rating of 4.49 million.
