= TEOTWAWKI (Fear the Walking Dead) =

- Fear the Walking Dead episode
- Episode no.: Season 3 Episode 3
- Directed by: Deborah Chow
- Written by: Ryan Scott
- Original air date: June 11, 2017
- Running time: 43 minutes

Guest appearances
- Jason Manuel Olazabal as Dante Esquivel; Rae Gray as Gretchen Trimbol; Michael William Freeman as Blake Sarno; Emma Caulfield as Tracy Otto; Rubén Blades as Daniel Salazar

Episode chronology
← Previous "The New Frontier"	Next → "100"
- Fear the Walking Dead (season 3)

"TEOTWAWKI" (acronym for The end of the world as we know it), is the third episode of the third season of the post-apocalyptic horror television series Fear the Walking Dead, which aired on AMC on June 11, 2017.

This episode marks the return of Daniel Salazar (Rubén Blades) in season 3 as the character was last seen in the second season's mid-season finale episode "Shiva".

== Plot ==
In a pre-apocalypse television commercial, Jeremiah Otto and his family promote a video series on the key to surviving TEOTWAWKI (the end of the world as we know it). The ranch holds a meeting in the wake of the helicopter pilot's death, where Troy, Jake, and Jeremiah vow justice. Other residents express contempt for Madison and her family. A recovering Luciana informs Nick that they must leave the ranch as soon as possible. Back in her cabin, Madison discovers Troy laying in Nick's bed, and he expresses contempt for her son; Madison tells Troy that Nick will learn to fit in. While boar hunting, Nick discovers he and Troy have similar worldviews. The team investigating the helicopter shooting are overdue; Troy is to lead a second team and Madison volunteers to accompany them. Elsewhere, Strand arrives at the Gonzalez Dam, where he is reunited with old friend Dante Esquevil, offering him a partnership in controlling the dam's dwindling water supplies, but Dante instead has Strand imprisoned; while in his cell, Strand is reunited with Daniel.

== Reception ==
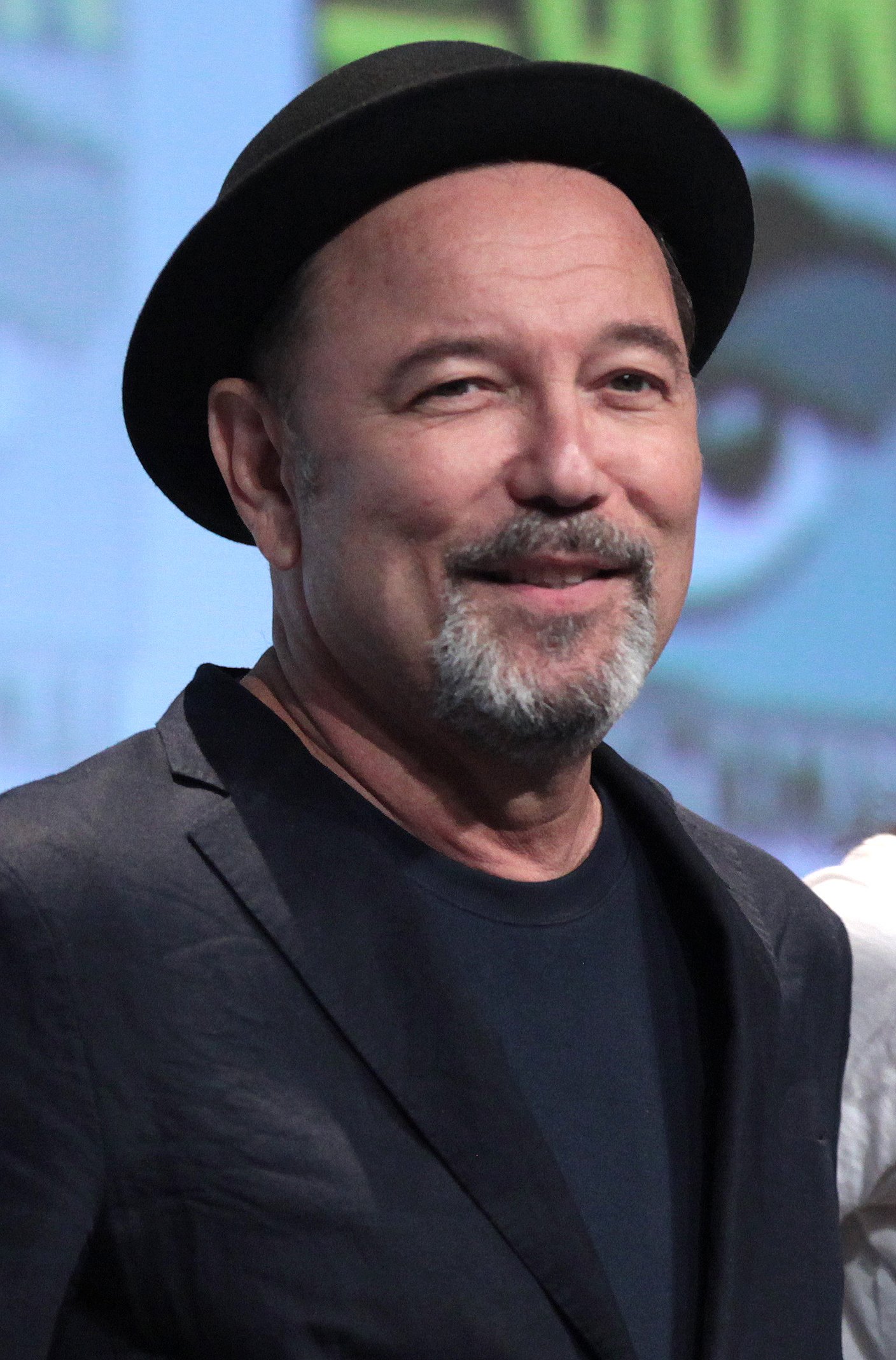
Ruben Blades (Daniel Salazar) makes his return in this episode.

"TEOTWAWKI", received critical acclaim from critics. On Rotten Tomatoes, "TEOTWAWKI" garnered a perfect 100% rating, (the first episode of Fear the Walking Dead to do so), with an average score of 7.34/10 based on 7 reviews.

Matt Fowler of IGN gave "TEOTWAWKI" a 7.7/10.0 rating, stating; ""Teotwawki" made sure to address the Troy issue while also, perhaps, sweeping it to the side for a bit. I liked that the things that needed to be said got said, but I'll also roll my eyes a bit if, going forward, the Clarks start to actually bond with Troy the way Nick seemed to be doing right at the end. Troy may not have killed Travis (and those enemies seem to be the priority right now heading into next week) but he still caused all of the chaos that led to his death. The return of Daniel in that closing beat was a nice touch and I'm happy to see Ruben Blades back on the show."

=== Ratings ===
"TEOTWAWKI" was seen by 2.50 million viewers in the United States on its original air date, below the previous episodes rating of 2.70 million.
