= Monster (Fear the Walking Dead) =

- Fear the Walking Dead episode
- Episode no.: Season 2 Episode 1
- Directed by: Adam Davidson
- Written by: Dave Erickson
- Original air date: April 10, 2016
- Running time: 43 minutes

Guest appearances
- Elizabeth Rodriguez as Liza Ortiz; Daniel Zovatto as Jack Kipling (voice) (uncredited)

Episode chronology
← Previous "The Good Man"	Next → "We All Fall Down"
- Fear the Walking Dead (season 2)

"Monster" is the second season premiere episode, and the 7th episode overall of the post-apocalyptic horror television series Fear the Walking Dead, which aired on AMC on April 10, 2016 in the United States.

This episode marks the final appearance of Elizabeth Rodriguez (Liza Ortiz), who died in the previous episode, she briefly appears as a corpse in this episode.

== Plot ==
The group evacuates to the Abigail as the military firebombs Los Angeles, in an attempt to contain the outbreak. They bring Liza's body, planning to give her a burial at sea. While sailing on open water, the group comes across another boat full of survivors, but Strand refuses to pick them up, despite protests from most of the others. Strand informs the group they are heading to San Diego. At Strand's request, Alicia mans the radio, but hears only distress calls from other vessels. After some time, she manages to get in contact with another seaborne survivor named Jack; the two of them begin exchanging information and regularly speaking. Travis notices Chris and Daniel bonding over their losses. Madison grows concerned at Strand's refusal to sleep, and Daniel tells her that he is suspicious of Strand's motives. Once they are far enough out to sea, the group holds a funeral for Liza and buries her at sea, but Chris suddenly lashes out and prematurely throws her body overboard; when Travis tries to speak with him, he punches Travis and says that he blames him for Liza's death.

Alicia learns from Jack that his boat is taking on water, and he asks if her group would be able to help, since they are close by. Strand rejects her request to help Jack, saying that he has grown tired of the group's constant requests for helping strangers, and threatening to throw overboard anyone who disobeys him. Alicia lets Jack know that her group refused to offer help, and he cryptically responds that he will "see her soon" before ceasing all communication. Later that evening, as the group prepares for dinner, Chris unexpectedly leaps overboard; Nick jumps in after him, only to find several undead floating in the water. They discover that they seem to have came from a nearby capsized sailboat, whose hull is riddled with bullet holes. Nick recovers the ship's logs, and he and Chris return to the Abigail. Shortly after they return, Strand warns that another ship is fast approaching them, which he suspects is hostile.

== Reception ==
"Monster" received positive reviews from critics. On Rotten Tomatoes, it garnered a 73% rating with an average score of 6.95/10 based on 22 reviews. The site consensus reads: "Swimming zombies, a unique ocean-escape narrative, and improved character development overcome the sluggish pace of 'Monster.'"

Matt Fowler of IGN gave "Monster" a 6.7/10 rating stating: "Fear the Walking Dead's Season 2 premiere gave us an exciting 'Escape from LA' opening sequence, a unique seafaring setting, and teased some interesting dangers coming our way. But the episode itself was flat and filled with highly emotional characters making poor choices/mistakes. Which then only causes us to side with the sociopath of the group."

=== Ratings ===
"Monster" was seen by 6.67 million viewers in the United States on its original air date, slightly below the first season finales rating of 6.86 million
