= Brendan Meyer =

Canadian actor

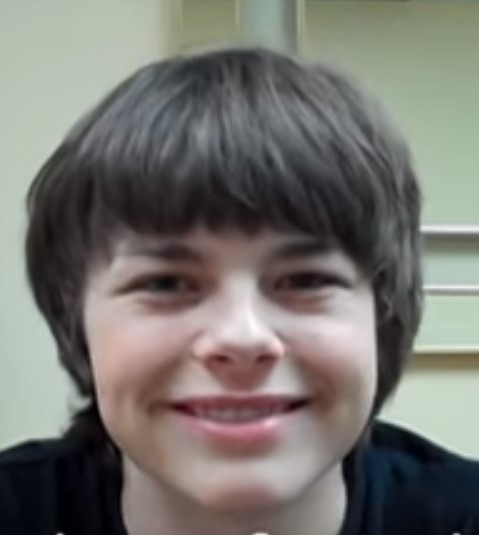
- Meyer in 2012
- Born: October 2, 1994 (age 31); Kitchener-Waterloo, Ontario, Canada
- Occupation: Actor
- Years active: 2005–present
- Website: BrendanMeyer.ca

Brendan Meyer (born October 2, 1994) is a Canadian actor.

== Career ==
He is best known for his roles as Adam Young in Mr. Young and as Nelson Ort on the television show Dinosapien. In 2016, he appeared in the Netflix series The OA. He is also known for his portrayal of Eric/Dunbar Rakes in the web series T@gged.

== Filmography ==
=== Films (theatrical and television) ===
Year	Title	Role	Notes
2005	Waking Up Wally: The Walter Gretzky Story	Goalie	
2006	For the Love of a Child	David	
2007	The Secret of the Nutcracker	Frank	
2008	Freezer Burn: The Invasion of Laxdale	Little Brat	
2008	A Pickle	Kelly	Short film
2009	Christmas in Canaan	Bobby	
2010	Tooth Fairy	Ben	
2012	Girl vs. Monster	Henry	TV film
2013	Garage Sale Mystery	Logan	
2013	The Christmas Ornament	Connor	TV film
2014	The Guest	Luke Peterson	
2014	Starving in Suburbia	Leo	
2016	Code Blue: A Love Story	James	Short film
2016	Parker and the Crew	Timmy	TV Film
2017	Andy	Andy	Short film
2018	When Jeff Tried to Save the World	Stanford	
2018	All These Small Moments	Howie Sheffield	
2018	Steven		Short film
2018	Unfollowed	Connor Oakley	
2019	Color Out of Space	Benny Gardner	
2019	Only Humans	Evan	
2021	Delivery	Stevie	Short film
2022	The Friendship Game	Rob Plattier	
2023	The Unheard	Joshua	
2023	The List	Rob	
2023	Master of the House	Vincent	Short film
2023	Camp	Jake	

=== Television series ===
Year	Title	Role	Notes
2007	Dinosapien	Nelson Ort	15 episodes
2007	Blood Ties	Travis Deskin	Episode: "Post Partum"
2009	The Assistants	Barry Collins	Episode: "The Break Up"
2010–2013	R. L. Stine's The Haunting Hour	Will Johnston, Nathan	Episodes: The Dead Body, Creature Feature Parts 1 & 2, and The Dead Body: Part 2
2011–2013	Mr. Young	Adam Young	Lead role
2013	Life with Boys	Blake	Episode: Girl-Entines Day With Boys
2013	Cedar Cove	Anson	Episode: "Help Wanted"
2014	CSI: Crime Scene Investigation	Mark Powell	Episode: "The Fallen"
2014	The 100	Myles	3 episodes
2015	Backstrom	Claudio Moretti	Episode: "Bogeyman"
2015	Falling Skies	Kyle	Episode: "Respite"
2015	Best Friends Whenever	The Rob	Episode: "A Time to Rob and Slam"
2015	Fear the Walking Dead: Flight 462	Jake Powell	16 mini-episodes
2015	Motive	Wesley "Wes" Hillridge	Episode: "Fallen"
2015, 2016	iZombie	Austin	Episodes: "Zombie Bro" & "Reflections of the Way Liv Used to Be"
2016–2018	T@gged	Eric/Dunbar Rakes	Main role (season 1); guest (season 3)
2016	Fear the Walking Dead	Jake Powell	Episode: "Ouroboros"
2016–2019	The OA	Jesse	Main role
2019	Hudson & Rex	Kevin	Episode: "School Daze"
2021	Tribal	Hanson Bukansky	4 episodes
2025	Sight Unseen	Miles Gatlin	Episode: Murder on the Dance Floor
2026	Allegiance	Jordy Cortland	Episode: The Mission

== Awards and nominations ==
Year	Award	Category	Work	Result	Ref.
2010	Young Artist Award	Best Performance in a TV Movie, Miniseries or Special Leading Young Actor	Christmas in Canaan	Nominated	
2010	Young Artist Award	Best Performance in a TV Series - Guest Starring Young Actor 14 and Over	The Assistants	Nominated	
2014	Joey Awards	Young Actor age 16–19 in a TV Series Drama or Comedy Guest Starring or Principal Role	CSI: Crime Scene Investigation	Won	
