= Christmas in Canaan =

2009 film directed by Neill Fearnley

- Based on: Christmas in Canaan by Kenny Rogers; Donald Davenport
- Screenplay by: Donald Davenport
- Directed by: Neill Fearnley
- Starring: Billy Ray Cyrus with: Ben Cotton; Emily Tennant
- Countries of origin: United States; Canada
- Original language: English

Production
- Producer: Randy Cheveldave
- Cinematography: Michael Balfry
- Editor: Romald Geoffrey
- Running time: 96 minutes

Original release
- Network: Hallmark Channel
- Release: December 12, 2009

Christmas in Canaan is a 2009 drama film starring country music singer Billy Ray Cyrus. The film is based on the book of the same name written by country music artist Kenny Rogers and Donald Davenport. Filming began at the end of August 2009 and finished in mid-September. It was filmed in Vancouver, British Columbia, Canada.

The film premiered on December 12, 2009, on the Hallmark Channel. Its theme song, "We'll Get By Somehow (We Always Do)" (performed by Cyrus), was made into a music video.

== Plot ==
In the rural town of Canaan, Texas, a clash between two classmates – one, a tough farm boy, and the other, a bright bookish black boy – evolves into an unlikely friendship. The boys' families devise a plan to teach them a lesson after they fight, but it is a wounded puppy that eventually brings them together. It is amidst the magic of Christmas that the boys learn about family, hope, and love despite living under the shadow of racism.

== Cast ==
- Billy Ray Cyrus as Daniel Burton
- Ben Cotton as Buddy
- Emily Tennant as Sarah
- Jacob Blair as DJ
- Matt Ward as Rodney
- Liam James as Bobby
- Tom McBeath as Earl
- Jessica McLeod as Young Sarah
- Darien Provost as Young Bobby
- Zak Ludwig as Young DJ
- Nico McEown as Jimmy Ray
- Stefanie Samuels as Angela
- Tom Heaton as Wylie
- Rukiya Bernard as Charlane
- Jaishon Fisher as Young Rodney
- Julian Christopher as Shoup
- Paul Herbert as Clancey
- Candus Churchill as Eunice
- Stacee Copeland as Nurse
- Lossen Chambers as Celie

== See also ==
- Billy Ray Cyrus filmography
- List of Christmas films
