= Fear the Walking Dead: Flight 462 =

- Genre: Post-apocalyptic; Zombie apocalypse; Horror; Drama
- Based on: The Walking Dead by: Robert Kirkman; Tony Moore; Charlie Adlard
- Written by: Lauren Signorino; Michael Zunic
- Directed by: Michael McDonough
- Starring: Michelle Ang; Brendan Meyer
- Composer: Kevin Blumenfeld
- No. of episodes: 16

Production
- Executive producers: Tally Barr; David Wiener; Jared Hoffman; Chris Pollack; Michael Petok; Dave Erickson; Jeremy Platt; Troy Miller

Original release
- Network: AMC.com
- Release: October 4, 2015 – March 26, 2016

Fear the Walking Dead: Flight 462 is a 16-part web series based on the television series Fear the Walking Dead. The series premiered on October 4, 2015, on AMC's official website. It also aired as promos during The Walking Dead's sixth season. The web series tells the story of a group of passengers aboard a commercial airplane during the earliest moments of the outbreak. Over the course of the series, the plane and the lives of its passengers are put in jeopardy once they discover an infected traveler. Two of its characters, Alex (Michelle Ang) and Jake (Brendan Meyer), are introduced in Fear the Walking Dead season two, episode three, "Ouroboros".

== Cast ==
- Brendan Meyer as Jake Powell
- Michelle Ang as Alex (previously known as Charlie)
- Kathleen Gati as Deirdre
- Lisa Waltz as Suzanne
- Brett Rickaby as Marcus
- Kevin Sizemore as Anthony
- Sheila Shaw as Connie

== Webisodes ==
No.	Title	Original release date
1	"Part 1"	October 4, 2015
A commercial jetliner, TruWest Airlines Flight 462, prepares for takeoff. On board, a young man named Jake Powell gets a call from his mother, who was unable to board the plane. She reassures Jake that everything will be alright, and that his father will pick him up in the morning. Another passenger, Marcus confronts a flight attendant, saying that he received a message that flights are being grounded. As Jake attempts to get more information from his mother, he hears screaming in the background. Before he can say anything else, the woman in front of him abruptly shuts his side window closed.
2	"Part 2"	October 11, 2015
As the plane takes off, Jake tries desperately to text his mother and find out what happened to her, but the text message fails to send. Marcus vomits into a bag as his wife tries to comfort him. Alex looks back at Jake, who looks out the window as the plane flies over an unidentified city.
3	"Part 3"	October 18, 2015
The flight attendants begin to serve drinks throughout the cabin, and Jake has a short discussion with Connie about how he ended up on the plane without his mother.
4	"Part 4"	October 25, 2015
Marcus gets out of his seat and stumbles toward the back of the plane, disappearing into the bathroom while everyone looks on in confusion and concern. His wife tries to assure everyone that it is nothing to worry about, but Alex questions her about how long Marcus has been feeling ill. Jake then asks Alex if she thinks that Marcus is suffering from the strange disease that's been going around. She doesn't answer.
5	"Part 5"	November 1, 2015
As the plane begins its final descent into Phoenix, Marcus is still in the bathroom. Deirdre and Suzanne urge Marcus to come out of the bathroom, but get no response. Jake stares out the window, only to witness the lights go out across the city below him, leaving Phoenix in complete darkness. As Deirdre demands that Marcus exit the bathroom, Alex looks back and reaches for something at her waist.
6	"Part 6"	November 8, 2015
Deirdre tries to get Marcus to exit the lavatory as the blackout continues to roll across the city below. Alex gets out of her seat and heads for the back of the plane, urging Deirdre not to open the door. Suddenly, the bathroom door opens and Marcus falls out, unconscious. Deirdre and Suzanne try desperately to wake him up, with no success.
7	"Part 7"	November 15, 2015
Anthony attempts CPR on Marcus. The plane's captain announces over the intercom that the Phoenix airport has experienced a power outage, and thus the plane is being re-routed to Los Angeles. After attempts to revive Marcus are unsuccessful, Suzanne is hysterical. Anthony attempts to calm her down while other passengers, including Jake, look on. Desperate, Deirdre continues to perform CPR on Marcus, until Alex steps in, urging her to get away from Marcus. Alex then rips open Marcus's shirt, revealing a bloody wound on his abdomen.
8	"Part 8"	November 22, 2015
Alex urges Deirdre and Suzanne to tie Marcus up, and Suzanne rebukes her. Alex attempts to get them away from Marcus's body, but Anthony stops her, revealing himself to be a U.S. air marshal. He demands that all the passengers return to their seats, despite Alex's warning that Marcus is now dangerous. Deirdre uses a defibrillator in an attempt to revive Marcus, but is unsuccessful. Suddenly, Marcus opens his eyes, having reanimated into a zombie.
9	"Part 9"	February 12, 2016
Marcus, now a walker, tries to attack his wife, but she pulls away. With the help of Deirdre and Alex, Anthony hits Marcus against the wall and locks him inside the bathroom. Alex notices blood on her arm. She looks up and sees that the blood came from Deirdre, who has been scratched on the arm.
10	"Part 10"	February 12, 2016
With Marcus stuck in the bathroom, Alex cleans up the blood and orders Anthony to tie up Deirdre. Anthony tries to get the first aid kit to help her, but she says that what happened to Marcus will also happen to her. Alex orders Deirdre to tell the captain to land the plane, but Deirdre says that the lights are going out in other cities and that there is no place to land. Alex and Jake exchange worried looks.
11	"Part 11"	February 21, 2016
Anthony comforts Suzanne, while Marcus repeatedly bangs against the bathroom door. Anthony tells Suzanne to step back from the door, but she says that she just wants to see her husband. Anthony explains that her husband is sick, and Suzanne begs Anthony to help him. Suzanne tries to open the bathroom door, but Alex stops her. Suzanne kneels down and taps the door, tearfully telling Marcus that she loves him.
12	"Part 12"	February 28, 2016
Anthony tells everyone to take their seats. Suzanne is still at the bathroom door, looking up at the lock. She gets up and says that she doesn't hear anything behind the door. Suzanne tries to open the door again, but Alex tries to stop her. Suzanne pushes Alex back, saying that Marcus is dying. Alex tells her that he's already dead. Suzanne opens the locked bathroom door, and an undead Marcus as a zombie charges out. He attacks Suzanne as everyone else stares in shock, ripping her throat out and killing her. Anthony pulls out his gun and starts shooting Marcus in the chest. Unaffected by the bullets, Marcus pounces on Anthony. Alex yells at Anthony, telling him to shoot Marcus in the head, but Anthony has run out of bullets.
13	"Part 13"	March 6, 2016
Alex comes to Anthony and grabs Marcus, attempts to remove him from it. The two end up falling, but Marcus still tries to grab Alex who starts to crawl away and kicks his face waiting him out. Jake goes up seats and takes a knitting needle in Connie's bag, passes over Marcus and gives the needle to Alex, who stabs Marcus in the head and kills him. Everyone is relieved, until Jake, Alex and Deirdre realize the glass window of the plane is cracking.
14	"Part 14"	March 13, 2016
Alex, Anthony and Jake are catching their breath as Deirdre comforts a mortally wounded Suzanne. She tells Alex that Suzanne is dying. Alex looks at the knitting needle before stabbing Suzanne in the head. Deirdre, Jake and Anthony look on in shock. Anthony says she killed her, but she claims that she "saved" Suzanne. As Deirdre sobs over Suzanne's body, Alex looks at the cracked window as it shatters open.
15	"Part 15"	March 20, 2016
Everyone tries to get to a seat, put on an oxygen mask and brace for impact. Alex confesses to Jake that she was the one who took the last seat on the plane that was meant for his mom and apologizes. Jake says his mom is probably with his dad. She comforts him by saying he'll be with her too.
16	"Part 16"	March 26, 2016
While searching nearby houses for drugs, Nick Clark witnesses Flight 462 fly directly over him. The plane is dangerously low and out-of-control. Alex, Deirdre, and the rest of the passengers brace for impact. The plane disappears over the horizon, and Nick stares in shock and confusion. The ultimate fates of everybody aboard Flight 462 are left unknown until Season 2 Episode 3 "Ouroboros" where it is revealed that it had crashed into the coast, killing everyone on board except for a few passengers.

== Awards and nominations ==
Year	Award	Category	Recipient	Result	Ref.
2016	68th Writers Guild of America Awards	Short Form New Media – Adapted	Michael Zunic & Lauren Signorino	Nominated	
2016	68th Primetime Creative Arts Emmy Awards	Outstanding Short Form Comedy or Drama Series	Fear the Walking Dead: Flight 462	Nominated	
2016	68th Primetime Creative Arts Emmy Awards	Outstanding Actress in a Short Form Comedy or Drama Series	Michelle Ang	Nominated	
