= Victor Strand (Fear the Walking Dead) =

Strand
- Fear the Walking Dead character
- Colman Domingo as Victor Strand
- First appearance: "Cobalt" (2015)
- Last appearance: "The Road Ahead" (2023)
- Created by: Robert Kirkman; Dave Erickson; David Wiener
- Portrayed by: Colman Domingo

In-universe information
- Aliases: Strand; Anton
- Occupation: Medic; Businessman; Medic for the Rosarito Beach Hotel; Supply Runner for the Dell Diamond Baseball Stadium community; Leader of his Tower
- Family: Klaus (adopted son)
- Spouse: Frank (husband)
- Significant other: Thomas Abigail (late boyfriend)

Victor Strand is a fictional character in the AMC television series Fear the Walking Dead portrayed by Colman Domingo. The character was created by Robert Kirkman, Dave Erickson and David Wiener.

Despite his villainous tendencies and selfish decisions, Victor's relationship with Madison and Alicia Clark was what kept him from going off the deep end. However, his shady behaviour sparked hostile rivalries with characters like Daniel Salazar and Morgan Jones. Eventually, Victor went from an untrustworthy conman to a dictatorial leader of his own community, putting him at odds with his former allies. He was eventually dethroned and renounced his antagonistic ways.

Domingo's portrayal of Victor has been well received by critics and fans. Initially a member of the recurring cast, Domingo was upgraded to series regular after the first season.

== Character biography ==
Victor is a mysterious character who has acquired great personal wealth as immediately indicated by his suit and jewelry, He appears to already have some knowledge of the outbreak and how it manifests itself in humans. It is unknown how long he was imprisoned at the temporary hospital set up in Raynard Community College before Nick arrived. He is calm and does not panic when confronting the walkers, even when he was trapped at the end of a locked corridor as a herd approached. He appears to have adapted quickly to the new world, telling Nicholas Clark that the only way to survive a mad world is to embrace the madness. Victor has a good sense of judgement, quickly assessing that Nick is weak, yet believing that Nick has the skills to survive. Victor identifies Nick's heroin addiction as a precursor to the behavior necessary for survival. Additionally, Victor appears to have some elements of a sociopath.

=== Season 1 ===
"The only way to survive a mad world is to embrace the madness."

— Victor Strand

In a military cell, Strand bribes a guardsman to save a feverish Nick from being moved. Strand later recruits Nick for an escape plot. The group drives to the National Guard's headquarters to rescue Liza, Griselda, and Nick. Travis' group reach the holding cells and set the detainees free before reuniting with Nick, Liza, and Strand. They try to escape through the medical ward, where they discover Dr. Exner has euthanized all of the patients. Dr. Exner tells them of an escape route before presumably committing suicide. Before they can escape, the group encounters Adams, who shoots Ofelia in the arm. Enraged, Travis brutally beats Adams and leaves him for dead. Strand leads the group to his oceanside mansion where he reveals to Nick that he owns a yacht called the Abigail, on which he plans to escape.

=== Season 2 ===
The group evacuated to the Abigail as the military bombed Los Angeles in an attempt to contain the outbreak. Out at sea, the group encountered another boat full of survivors, but Strand refused to pick them up. He informed the group that they were headed to San Diego. Alicia operated the radio, only to hear distress calls, and she struck up a conversation with another seaborne survivor named Jack. Madison became concerned about how Strand refused to sleep. Daniel told her he was suspicious of Strand's motives. Once they are far enough out to sea, the group held a funeral for Liza and buried her at sea. Strand threatened to throw overboard anyone who disobeyed him. The group docked on a nearby island to escape pursuit of the unknown ship. They soon had to leave because George poisoned his entire family as part of a suicide pact, and the group was forced to leave the remainder of George's family behind on the island. With the news that San Diego was burned down, it is revealed that Strand intended to go to Mexico all along. On the way to Mexico the boat's cooling system clogged and Strand ordered Travis to fix it. They met a woman named Alex and a boy who is badly burned. They agreed to be towed behind the boat, but in the middle of the night Strand cut the rope. b Bandits hijacked the Abigail and captured the group, but Strand tried to raft away. The raft was shot as he was escaping and it began to slowly sink. After being saved, and after reuniting with his contact, Luis, Strand felt indebted to Madison for rescuing him from an inevitable death. He supported her plan to get Travis and Alicia back when she decided to trade with the bandits who stole his yacht, the Abigail. Additionally, Victor was confronted by Madison for sending Nick to look for his partner and barred him from using Nick again for his errands. Strand arranged to pay the Mexican military for safe passage, but a shooting ensued that left two officers and Luis, dead. Strand discovered that Thomas has been bitten and was dying so he decided to end his suffering. After Thomas' death, Celia was furious with Strand and demanded that he and his group leave. Shortly after Nick brought Luis to her, Celia lets the group stay, but demanded that Strand leave. After Daniel set fire to the mansion, Strand helped the rest of the group escape the fire.

Moments after the fire, Strand fled to the Abigail with Alicia, Madison, and Ofelia, but they discover it hard been stolen. Shortly after the group manages6 to settle in a hotel in search of supplies. Madison and Strand got drunk at the hotel bar while they expressed their various frustrations with life. A large horde of infected attacked the hotel, trapping the four of them inside. Using the technique of covering themselves with walker blood, Victor and Madison managed to pass unnoticed among the undead and escaped unscathed from the hotel. After discovering that the van in which they had traveled had disappeared, Strand quickly deduced that either Ofelia, or Alicia, was responsible and the duo had no choice but to take refuge in the hotel again. Hearing the noises of someone calling for help, Victor and Madison managed just in time to save Alicia, Elena and Hector from a group of infected. Strand and Madison met Oscar, the leader of the hotel's survivors and negotiated a truce. Madison, Strand, Alicia and other survivors began the job of clearing the hotel of the infected; they were successful and the survivors celebrated. Strand then went to speak privately with Oscar, who was still mourning the death of his wife. Strand comforted Oscar and convinced him to finally let his wife go. Oscar gave Strand the key to the hotel room where his infected wife was imprisoned and Strand walked in to finish her off, immediately after which he was stabbed and wounded by Ilene, the mother of Oscar's wife. His wound was not serious but required medical treatment. After recovering from his injuries, Madison informed Strand that Brandon and Derek were in the parking lot and that she suspects Chris is dead. Strand discouraged her from telling Travis, as it would destroy the only thing keeping him going. It was the same hope Strand lost when Thomas died. Madison agreed that the news about Chris would break Travis. After Travis beat Brandon and Derek to death, Madison insisted they should leave the hotel with him, but Strand refused to have anything to do with the plan. Later, after the residents attempted to kill Travis because Oscar Diaz died from his injuries, Alicia killed Andrés and Strand appeared to help them and, at gunpoint, forced Hector and the residents to leave Madison, Alicia, and Travis alone. Strand helped the three escape, but insisted on staying at the hotel.

=== Season 7 ===
Strand has evolved into a tyrannical dictator in charge of his own community, the abandoned office tower he survived the nuke in. This puts him at huge odds with Morgan Jones; the season revolves around this conflict.

=== Season 8 ===
In the seven years after being separated from the group, Strand has formed a new community in a hotel of German tourists that were stranded in the United States at the start of the outbreak. He has married a man named Frank and becomes Frank's son Klaus' adoptive father. Remorseful for his past, Strand has changed his name to "Anton" and has become a benevolent and beloved leader of his community. He is suddenly reunited with Madison, who revealed to have survived the stadium. While initially denying his true identity to Madison, Strand eventually confesses to her all of the atrocities he committed while in control of the Tower. A group of hostile survivors hunt for Madison, causing Strand to team up with his old friend to evade them until they are eventually captured. The leader of the group is revealed to be Troy Otto, who survived the dam explosion and threatens to bludgeon Strand to death until Madison tells him where PADRE is. Accepting of his fate, Strand confesses the truth about his identity to Frank and Klaus, but professes his love for them both. Suddenly, Daniel saves Strand and Madison, and are forced to leave the hotel. When Troy claims that he killed Alicia, Strand pulls Madison back after she attempts to strike him, as he urges her not to let Troy get into her head.

Strand, now having rejoined the group, attempts to help Madison with her vengeance against Charlie and Troy for the deaths of her children. When Madison sends Charlie on a suicide mission to assassinate Troy, Strand is visibly disturbed by her actions and urges her to give Charlie a second chance. After Charlie's death, Madison leaves PADRE under Strand's command and departs the group. Strand captures Troy's daughter, Tracy and tries to use her against Troy. Upon being reunited with June, Dwight and Sherry, they insist on trading Strand over to Troy alongside Tracy, still harboring resentment towards him for his past actions. He manages to escape with Tracy and regroups with Madison, Daniel and Luciana. Upon realizing that Daniel wants to use Tracy against Troy as revenge for Ofelia's death, Strand pulls a gun on Daniel and is thrown out of the car. He encounters a group of survivors that Alicia saved that are working to honor her memory. Strand continues to try and persuade Madison to keep Alicia's memory alive, but Madison is still insistent on killing Troy.

After Troy's death, Strand desperately attempts to rush back to PADRE to save Frank and Klaus from the impending horde that Troy's men unleashed. Trapped in a garage, Strand puts the group in danger by opening the doors in a desperate move to save his family, resulting in Daniel lashing out on both Strand and Madison, blaming them for the death of everyone he loves. When Madison refuses to go back to PADRE, Strand tearfully pleads with her to help, but she doesn't budge. In the end, the herd is destroyed when Madison saves them all, but is seemingly killed in the process. In the aftermath, Strand makes peace with Daniel and Luciana before leaving with Frank and Klaus. Before he leaves, Strand notices Madison, Alicia and Tracy in the distance, confirming their survival. Satisfied knowing that his friends are alive, Strand and his family depart to find a new life elsewhere.

== Development and reception ==
Domingo made his debut in the first-season episode "Cobalt". For the second season, Domingo was promoted to a series regular, and would later become a prominent character. Matt Fowler for IGN described him as a weird, suited "Randall Flagg" type character.

Domingo's performance was praised in the episode "Blood in the Streets". Matt Fowler of IGN stated that the best part of "Blood in the Streets," which was the exploration of Strand's backstory. Or at least, via flashbacks, important notable moments that helped explain Strand's wealth, yacht, and passage to Mexico. Along with a couple of character layers that helped round the guy out as something more than a direct, coarse, logic-monster.

Domingo received praise for his performance in the seventh season episode, "The Portrait". Emily Hannemann of TVInsider states that despite the show's writing, Domingo's performance made the episode worthwhile. "This was an improvement over last week’s episode, mostly because Colman Domingo is so much fun to watch. Whether you’re a fan of this season’s pacing or not, there’s no denying he’s having a grand time playing villain Strand."
