= Arturo Del Puerto =

Puerto Rican actor (born 1976)

- Born: October 24, 1976 (age 50); Rio Piedras, Puerto Rico
- Occupation: Actor
- Years active: 2009–present
- Notable work: Pulse, Westworld, Ride Along 2, For All Mankind, Godfather of Harlem

Arturo Del Puerto (born October 24, 1976) is a Puerto Rican actor who has appeared in television series such as Fear the Walking Dead, Chicago P.D., Ride Along 2, and the Apple TV+ original science fiction space drama series For All Mankind.

== Biography ==
Del Puerto is half Puerto Rican and half Spanish. He studied acting and singing in Madrid and improvisation at the UCB Centre in New York.

== Filmography ==
=== Film ===
Year	Film	Role	Notes
2009	Nueva York	Spaniard	Short film
2012	The Man Who Shook the Hand of Vicente Fernandez	Alejandro	
2012	A Little Something on the Side	Coop	Short film
2013	30 Nights of Paranormal Activity with the Devil Inside the Girl with the Dragon Tattoo	Felipe the Manny	
2013	The Devil's in the Details	Frank	
2013	Gone Missing	Gabe	
2016	Ride Along 2	Alonso	
2016	Independence Day: Resurgence	Bordeaux	
2016	The Happys	Ricky	
2016	The Wedding Party	Maximiliano	

=== Television ===
Year	TV Show	Role	Notes
2011	The Mentalist	Roberto Salvador	Episode: "Red Queen"
2011	The Defenders	Jorge	Episode: "Nevada v. Doug the Mule"
2012	Bones	Juan Chiquez	Episode: "The Tiger in the Tale"
2012	Touch	Jorge	Episode: "Noosphere Rising"
2012	Raising Hope	Falvey	Episode: "Jimmy's Fake Girlfriend"
2013	CSI: Crime Scene Investigation	Alex Garnez	Episode: "Check in and Check out"
2013	Austin & Ally	Jean-Paul Paul-Jean	2 episodes
2013	The Bridge	Hector Valdez	4 episodes
2014	The Lottery	Member of the MayTwo's	5 episodes
2014	Rizzoli & Isles	Luis Benitez	Episode: "Knockout"
2014	Chicago P.D.	Andres 'Pulpo' Diaz	4 episodes
2015	NCIS	Edward 'Collarbone' Rosario	Episode: "Patience"
2015	Agent X	El Diablo	Episode: "The Devil & John Case"
2015-2016	Doc McStuffins	Pop-up Paulo	Voice, 2 episodes
2016	Fear the Walking Dead	Luis Flores	4 episodes
2016	The Magicians	Servant of Our Lady Underground	Episode: "Thirty-Nine Graves"
2017	Better Things	Arturo	Episode: "September"
2018	Camping	Miguel	
2018	The Flash	Edwin Gauss / Folded Man, Clifford DeVoe (in Folded Man's body)	Episode: "Lose Yourself"
2018	The Last Ship	Antonio Maza	4 episodes
2018-21	DuckTales	Panchito Pistoles	Voice, 3 episodes
2019, 2022	For All Mankind	Octavio Rosales	Recurring, seasons 1 and 3
2020	Elena of Avalor	Rico	Voice, episode: "Crash Course"
2020	Tommy	Arturo Lopez	2 episodes
2021–2022	Big Sky	T-Lock	Recurring, season 2
2022	Killing it	Marco	3 episodes
2022	Westworld	Hugo Mora	Episode: "The Auguries"
2023	Godfather of Harlem	Che Guevara	2 episodes
2024	The Lincoln Lawyrer	Hector Moya	2 episode
2025	Pulse	Luis	Recurring role
2026	Downforce	Emiliano	Main role
TBA	Frisco King †	Hector	

=== Videogames ===
Year	Film	Role	Notes
2013	Assassin's Creed IV: Black Flag	Additional voices	
2017	Tom Clancy's Ghost Recon Wildlands	El Pozolero	Voice
