= Daniel Salazar =

- Fear the Walking Dead character
- Rubén Blades as Daniel Salazar
- First appearance: "So Close, Yet So Far" (2015)
- Last appearance: "The Road Ahead" (2023)
- Created by: Robert Kirkman; Dave Erickson; Marco Ramirez
- Portrayed by: Rubén Blades

In-universe information
- Occupation: Sombra Negra vigilante agent; Barber; Janitor for the Gonzalez Dam; Chief Security Officer for the Gonzalez Dam
- Affiliation: Sombra Negra; Central Intelligence Agency (CIA)
- Family: Skidmark (pet cat)
- Spouse: Griselda Salazar
- Children: Ofelia Salazar (daughter)

Daniel Salazar is a fictional character in the television series Fear the Walking Dead, portrayed by Panamanian actor Rubén Blades. The character was created by Robert Kirkman, showrunner Dave Erickson and screenwriter Marco Ramirez.

== Character biography ==
Daniel is a highly intelligent, caring, cautious and formidable man who is a strong, determined survivor. Daniel's past as a secret agent of the Salvadoran Junta and CIA has revealed him to be a highly trained killer, having directly killed 100 people himself (with many more killed indirectly). His training and survival skills have shaped him into a formidable combatant. He is highly adept with firearms and hands to hand combat. Daniel is also shown to be a skilled torturer with extensive knowledge of interrogation techniques and is willing, albeit reluctantly, to use this skill when he feel it is necessary to survive. Daniel however does not appear to be pleased with the past atrocities he has committed or was forced to commit, and regrets being the monster that he was forced to become. Despite his murderous past, Daniel has demonstrated that he cares about his family more than anything else and is a loving husband and father who vowed to give his daughter the best life possible in the United States. He hid from her the truth of his past life, and dealt with the trauma privately with his wife's support. Daniel was shown to be devastated by the loss of his beloved wife, the anchor that kept him stable. He subsequently came unhinged for a time and nearly killed himself. Daniel is extremely cautious around those that he does not trust, and appears to be highly skilled at identifying a potential threat from body language and social cues.

=== Season 1 ===
While a riot rages outside, a mob sets fire to the store adjoining the barbershop, forcing the Salazars and Manawas to flee. The group reaches Travis' truck and escapes, but not before Griselda is injured by a collapsing scaffold. Unable to reach a hospital, the group drives to Madison's house. Nick leads Madison and Alicia to the Trans' house next door, where they take a shotgun. Travis arrives and is attacked by Mr. Dawson, who is shot and killed by Daniel. All three families decide to stay the night and evacuate in the morning. Nurse Liza tends to Griselda's injured foot but notes that Griselda will die if not treated by a doctor. Ofelia tells Daniel they should flee with Travis, but Daniel insists his family can survive alone and will join his cousin later. The next morning, as the Clarks and Manawas start driving away, the National Guard arrives and quarantines the block. While Travis says, "It's going to get better," Daniel laments that it's, "too late," as he watches a guardsman mark the neighboring house. Days after the National Guard quarantines the neighborhood into a Safe Zone, residents try to live normally. Tensions build under the military rule. Ofelia kisses Adams, who was unable to get Griselda's medicine. She sneaks outside the fence to investigate and finds evidence that the guardsmen killed civilians, even the uninfected. Daniel warns Madison of his El Salvador experience, when the sick were taken under the guise of receiving hospitalization but instead killed. Soldiers take Griselda and Nick to a hospital, but Nick's family protests his departure. Liza agrees to go to assist the medical team, despite not wanting to leave her son. Travis retreats to the roof and sees the signal from the Dead Zone. Seconds later, he sees and hears gunfire, followed by darkness. Madison discovers Daniel detaining Adams in the Trans' basement. Travis learns that Daniel tortured Adams into revealing what "Cobalt" means: in the morning, all civilians will be killed, and the guardsmen will evacuate the city. Griselda dies of septic shock at the hospital; Liza shoots her brain to prevent reanimation. Daniel visits a nearby sports arena to verify Adams' story that it was sealed with 2,000 now-zombified civilians inside. The group drives to the National Guard's headquarters to rescue Liza, Griselda, and Nick. Adams agrees to be their guide when let go by Travis. The group infiltrates the base after Daniel distracts the guards by leading a horde of walkers from the arena. Travis, Madison, Daniel, and Ofelia go inside, while Alicia and Chris stay behind. Meanwhile, the walkers breach the perimeter defenses and swarm the base. Travis' group reach the holding cells and set the detainees free before reuniting with Nick, Liza, and Strand. They try to escape through the medical ward, where they discover Dr. Exner has euthanized all of the patients. Dr. Exner tells them of an escape route before presumably committing suicide. Before they can escape, the group encounters Adams, who shoots Ofelia in the arm. Enraged, Travis brutally beats Adams and leaves him for dead. Strand leads the group to his oceanside mansion.

=== Season 2 ===
The group evacuates to the Abigail as the military bombs Los Angeles, in an attempt to contain the outbreak. Out at sea, the group comes across another boat full of survivors, but Strand refuses to pick them up. Strand informs the group they are heading to San Diego.

The group docks on a nearby island to escape pursuit of the unknown ship. They soon have to leave because George poisoned his entire family as part of a suicide pact, and the group are forced to leave the remains of George's family behind on the island. Suddenly, a sudden bandit attack put everyone's lives in danger, Daniel and the group were taken by surprise and tied up, where they were at the mercy of a rude boy named Reed, who showed no scruples when it came to acting and even I get to hurt Ofelia for fun. Looking for a way to turn the situation in his favor, he attempted to break free of his bonds, while Madison distracted the tyrant woman who was keeping an eye on them. Daniel, like the rest of his companions, finally met the leader of the group; Connor, who not only decided to take Travis and Alicia with him but also informed everyone that they would be stripped of the ship and abandoned on the shore. Fortunately, the intervention of Strand's partner - Luis Flores - started a shootout that ended most of the pirates and created a distraction, which Daniel took advantage of to disarm Reed and get him to be mortally wounded. Daniel treats the wound that Reed sustained from the crowbar. Reed tells Daniel that his brother, Connor, has a dozen men and five boats and will come looking for him. Daniel leaves Reed tied up in a chair. Daniel agrees to let Chris stand outside Reed's door, explaining to Ofelia that its better than leaving Chris alone to think dark thoughts. Daniel tells Madison that they can use Reed's relationship to Connor as leverage over Connor, Daniel listens into Luis and Strand's plan on how to get across the border and advises Madison to let Nick and Chris help fight Connor's group, urging her to stop treating them like children. Madison ignores his advice. When Reed turns after death. Daniel stabs Reed and pins him to a wall, leaving him alive. Daniel places a hood over Reed's head, devising a plan to use the undead Reed. "Take the gun, Daniel," says a voice, but the room is empty. He snaps out of his daze when Ofelia arrives, and together they escort Reed out of the room to deliver to the pirates to save Alicia and Travis. When they manage to reach the mansion of Thomas Abigail, in Valle de Guadalupe, Baja California, Daniel discovers that Celia keeps the dead relatives of the complex in the basement.

Throughout the season, Daniel displays increasing signs of mental illness following the death of his wife as noted by several characters including Ofelia and Celia. This leads to Daniel being haunted by hallucinations of his dead wife and the memories of the violent actions that he has taken in the past. Everything culminates in Daniel setting fire to the mansion in order to destroy the zombies held in the basement and what he feels to be an unholy place. Daniel hallucinates the zombies as all of the people that he has ever killed and Griselda emerges from the group to tell her husband that she's waiting for him. At peace, Daniel is apparently killed when the fire he set engulfs the mansion, making no move to escape.

=== Season 3 ===
Daniel returns in the third episode "TEOTWAWKI" after his disappearance in the previous season's mid-season finale "Shiva". He visits Strand in his cell, and asks about Ofelia's whereabouts, Strand lies about knowing where she is, however, Daniel sees through his lies and walks off.

It's revealed in "100" that Daniel survived the fire at the mansion and was taken in by a man named Efraim and a woman named Lola. Dante Esquivel quickly deduces Daniel's past as a member of Sombra Negra and takes Daniel on as an enforcer. Daniel remains interested in where Ofelia is and finds himself caught in the middle of a dispute between Dante and Lola. Ultimately, unable to bring himself to kill Lola, Daniel kills Dante and his men and saves Lola instead.

Strand and Daniel subsequently return to the hotel where Strand had been exiled from and where Strand claims to have last seen Ofelia. The two find the hotel overrun with zombies and no sign of any survivors. Strand eventually admits that he had lied as Ofelia disappeared from the hotel before Strand had left and Daniel abandons Strand. He then returns to the Gonzales Dam where Daniel works as the head of security.

Needing water for the Broke Jaw Ranch, Madison travels to the dam where she is shocked to be reunited with Daniel whom she had believed to be dead. Due to Madison and Walker having Ofelia safely back at the ranch, Daniel reaches an agreement with them for the water that they need and they promise to bring Ofelia to reunite with him. However, the ranch is overrun due to Troy Otto's efforts and Ofelia is bitten in the process. Madison takes the dying Ofelia to a bazar where Daniel will meet up with them, but Ofelia dies, having finally understood the man that her father was and wishing to have had the chance to get to know him better. A devastated Daniel arrives just moments too late and he can only prevent his daughter from reanimating. Despite his grief, Daniel agrees to take Madison and the others back to the dam as he knows that the bazar is too dangerous for them to stay at.

Unknown to the others, Strand makes a deal with the leader of the Proctors, a motorcycle gang that runs the bazar. Strand reveals the dam's location to the gang and they launch an invasion with Strand's help. Daniel realizes the truth and confronts Strand who shoots Daniel in the face, leaving him unconscious but alive. Having never even tried to kill a living person before, Strand is horrified by his actions and attempts to help the Clark family escape. Daniel is hidden by Lola who launches a suicide attack before being killed herself. Regaining consciousness, Daniel fights his way back to the top of the dam where he joins Nick as the young man destroys the dam with himself, Daniel and the Proctors apparently still on it.

Subsequently, Daniel is once again believed to be dead with Nick having somehow survived and reunited with his family, but with Madison's group being left with no sign of Daniel after the dam's destruction.

=== Season 5 ===
After getting into a plane crash, Althea radios Victor Strand to look in her tapes for one labeled "Skidmark," stating that the man in question owns another plane that he can use to rescue them. To Strand's shock, Skidmark proves to be Daniel Salazar, missing since the destruction of the Gonzales Dam years earlier. Strand pauses the video and stares in absolute disbelief at his old friend. Strand later seeks out Daniel's help and although Daniel allows Strand to use his equipment to call Luciana, he refuses to help him further as he believes that Alicia and the others are better off without Strand's help. During this time, he learns of the deaths of Madison and Nick and is saddened by the news. Skidmark is revealed to be Daniel's pet cat whom he had adopted at some point following the dam's destruction.

Desperate to save their friends, Strand, Sarah, Wendell and Charlie plot to break in to Daniel's warehouse while he's gone and steal the plane. Charlie inadvertently hitches a ride with Daniel who reveals that he is disarming the traps that the warehouse's previous owner had left around supply caches and dealing with the zombies that they had created. Things go awry, leaving Daniel chased by a growing herd and with the warehouse no longer being a safe place to retreat to due to the group tearing down part of Daniel's fence to get at the plane. When the machine guns on Al's SWAT van fail to fire, Strand lures the walkers into the engines of Daniel's plane, destroying the engines but saving Daniel's life. Daniel, who is revealed to blame Strand for the fact that Daniel never got to say goodbye to his daughter, reaches a peace with the other man. Daniel departs to continue disarming traps, but he allows the group the full use of his warehouse and supplies to help their friends. Having developed a paternal bond with Daniel, Charlie attempts to join him, but Daniel refuses as he knows that her friends need her more.

As Sarah and Wendell are trying to figure out how to light up a runway for the group's returning plane, Daniel arrives to help with strings of Christmas lights and a generator from his warehouse. With Daniel's help, Morgan's group safely lands and Daniel is happily reunited with both Charlie and a surprised Alicia, stating that he has decided to end his isolation.

Daniel subsequently leaves his warehouse for good and joins Morgan's caravan, working as the caravan's barber. At the end of the season, Daniel is separated from both Charlie and Skidmark when Virginia forcibly takes Morgan's group into her various settlements.

=== Season 6 ===
After having been forcefully separated from his beloved Skidmark, Daniel appears to have developed dementia and works as a barber for the Pioneers. However, it's quickly revealed that Daniel is only faking his dementia in order to keep Virginia and her Pioneers off-guard and he secretly begins working as a spy for Morgan inside of the organization. After Morgan captures Virginia's daughter Dakota, Daniel and Grace are used against him as hostages until Morgan and Virginia are able to reach a deal. The two are then released and Daniel joins Morgan's new community.

Following the creation of Morgan's community, Daniel settles into a role as the head of security and is reunited with Skidmark by Victor Strand who was able to locate Daniel's beloved cat and return him to Daniel as a peace offering between the two men. After an explosion and the community's weapons, which Daniel had locked up, going missing, Daniel becomes paranoid that there is a spy in the community for the doomsday cult that is threatening everyone's safety and he targets Strand as the most likely suspect, revealing the lingering effects of Strand shooting him in the face to the other man. Daniel goes so far as to allow a herd of walkers to threaten the gates of the community to try to force the thief to turn over the weapons, but Morgan returns and eliminates the herd with the guns on Al's SWAT van. Ultimately, it turns out that all of the strange occurrences that Daniel has been paranoid about have been caused by Daniel himself. June performs tests on Daniel and determines that his problems are not neurological but psychological, likely caused by his trouble settling into a more normal life while still under threat from the cult. Unwilling to continue to put his friends in danger, Daniel decides to leave with Skidmark and return to his warehouse, but Strand offers to take Daniel back to his base in Lawton, Oklahoma where he can look after him for Ofelia's sake. Daniel accepts Strand's offer and leaves with him.

In Grace's dream of the future, Daniel lives in Morgan's community where he works as a barber and is friends with Strand.

After Alicia reveals the doomsday cult's plans to launch the USS Pennsylvania's complement of nuclear missiles, Daniel joins the rest of Morgan's group in traveling to the beached sub near Galveston, Texas in order to stop them. Daniel remains outside with many of Morgan's friends and watches in horror as the cult manages to get a nuclear missile with ten warheads off before Morgan and Strand can stop them.

While trying to find cover from the coming nuclear destruction, Daniel hears a garbled transmission revealing coordinates to a safe location, but the cult's second-in-command Riley offers to take the group to the cult's hidden bunker instead. With Daniel unsure about the message and given his recent history, the group decides to head for the bunker, but Daniel remains suspicious of Riley's motives and interrogates him while they are stopped for repairs. Daniel realizes that Rollie is actually a spy for the cult and kills him, leading Riley to try to attack Daniel only to get shot himself by Charlie. Riley confirms that Daniel was right about Rollie, explaining that the incident with Daniel at Morgan's community broke Rollie's faith in them. With Daniel having been vindicated, Luciana backs him up on travelling to the coordinates that he was given where a CRM helicopter sent by Al rescues the group. Luciana reassures Daniel that all he needs is a little help and that they will be fine if they stick together.

=== Season 7 ===
In the months since the nuclear destruction of Texas, Daniel's condition has only continued to deteriorate despite Daniel and Luciana's best efforts. Daniel eventually descends into a full fugue state where he experiences memory blackouts and believes that his daughter Ofelia is still alive. Regardless, Luciana refuses to give up on him, leading to a close bond between the two, while Morgan sees Daniel as his group's best chance of outsmarting Victor Strand who has become the tyrannical dictator of the only safe place left.

In "Ofelia," Daniel delusionally becomes convinced that Ofelia is sending him messages and needs his help, causing Daniel, Luciana and Wes to get captured by the Stalkers who seek the location of a weapons cache that Dwight has found. Daniel becomes convinced that an old boat in the salvage yard that the Stalkers are living in is The Abigail, Strand's yacht from season 2 and the last place that Daniel remembers seeing Ofelia. Breaking free of the Stalkers, Luciana shows Daniel the truth, causing him to snap out of it briefly. Enraged, Daniel kills the Stalker Sage and then feeds the Stalker leader Arno to a pit of walkers in revenge for their attempts to manipulate him. Luciana's ability to see him at his worst and still accept him causes Daniel to declare her to be his family while Arno's death allows Luciana to convince the Stalkers to join them. Daniel reveals that his guilt over his inability to reconcile with Ofelia and show her the truth about who he really is causing his issues: Daniel's mind is tricking him into thinking that Ofelia is still alive and that he can make amends with her. Needing Daniel's help, Luciana reluctantly lies to him that Ofelia is alive and in Strand's Tower despite Daniel's warnings that it could break him if it turns out not to be true. Disgusted by this, Wes abandons the group and defects to Strand's side.

In "Divine Providence," Daniel joins Alicia in entering Strand's Tower, now completely delusional and seeking his daughter. Having been warned ahead of time by Wes, Strand has Daniel locked up, but he agrees to make peace upon learning that Alicia is dying of her walker bite. With Wes turning Strand's men against them, Alicia and Strand are forced to turn to Daniel, who kills his guard and breaks free, for help as their only ally. Daniel helps the two fight through the tower, focused on finding Ofelia. After learning that she's not there, Daniel tries to kill Strand, but Strand and Alicia show Daniel the dying Charlie and implore him that while Ofelia may be dead and beyond his help, Charlie, whom Daniel had formed a close bond with, is not. Finally recognizing the truth, Daniel breaks free of his fugue state and spares Strand's life, choosing to take care of Charlie for what time she has left. Although Daniel initially refuses to go with Strand and Alicia further to help their friends, he later comes to their rescue as Wes is about to kill them and then leads the others stuck outside into the tower as Strand and Alicia deal with the remaining guards and shut down the lighthouse beacon that is drawing in walkers. While confused by Luciana's actions, Daniel appears to forgive her for what she did.

In "Amina," following the destruction of the tower, Daniel joins the others in evacuating from Texas for good. After Alicia insists upon going back for Strand, Daniel helps to clear her a path and promises to see Alicia again someday when they part ways, telling Alicia that he's going to take care of the dying Charlie in her final weeks of life.

=== Season 8 ===
In the seven years since arriving at PADRE, Daniel has become the leader of a resistance movement against the organization.

In "Remember What They Took From You," Morgan tells Madison Clark that he doesn't know what's become of Daniel and Luciana.

In "Blue Jay," one of Daniel's resistance fighters, Adrian, tries to recruit Daniel's old friend June into his organization, although June, Dwight and Sherry remain unaware that Adrian is actually working for Daniel. While Daniel doesn't physically appear, his voice is briefly heard over the radio calling for Adrian to check in, although June, Dwight and Sherry don't appear to recognize it.

In "Odessa," Daniel's resistance group capture Madison, June, Mo, Shrike and Odessa Sanderson, reuniting an elated Daniel and Madison for the first time in nearly 12 years. Daniel explains that he was abandoned by PADRE in a swamp because they saw him as being too old and he has since gathered an army of the parents of the children who PADRE has taken as a resistance force. Having lost contact with Luciana and Charlie, Daniel is haunted by the idea that he has lost his remaining family. Daniel supports Madison's efforts to expose the true face behind PADRE, but after it fails, Madison tells him that they need Morgan's help to defeat PADRE.

In "More Time Than You Know," Daniel initially agrees to help with the mission to clear out PADRE's shipyard, but he backs out after learning that it needs to be done by hand. Daniel subsequently escorts June to help Dwight and Sherry's sick son Finch.

In "All I See is Red," Daniel joins the mission to save PADRE's Prefects - many of whom are the children of Daniel's group - from the herd unleashed from PADRE's shipyard. Daniel helps Madison to escape from Shrike and he attempts to use his own experiences as a child soldier to convince the Prefects to stand down before they do something that they can never come back from. Working together, Daniel, Madison and Daniel get the Prefects to stand down. Having lost Grace and made peace with his losses, Morgan decides to return to Alexandria with Mo, leaving PADRE in the hands of Daniel and Madison. Madison decides to reshape PADRE into what it was always meant to be and to try to find the other parents of the kidnapped children.

In "Anton," Daniel searches for the missing Madison who has been reunited with Strand and is being hunted for by a hostile group led by Troy Otto. Daniel rescues Madison, Strand and his people from Troy and promises to kill Troy when he gets the chance, recognizing Troy as the man responsible for Ofelia's death. However, Troy claims to have killed Alicia and he presents Alicia's prosthetic arm to Madison as proof.

In "Iron Tiger," a mission to find fuel leads to Daniel reuniting with Luciana and Charlie who was cured of her illness by PADRE. However, after Charlie confesses to killing Nick, Madison sends her on a mission to assassinate Troy, putting Madison and Daniel at odds. After being captured by Troy, Charlie commits suicide, sacrificing herself to protect PADRE. Devastated by the loss of another child, Daniel furiously accuses Madison of having something fundamentally wrong with her and he leaves PADRE. Luciana agrees to Daniel's request to come with her and look after Luciana, Daniel reminding the young woman that he had once told her that she is family to him.

In "Keeping Her Alive," Daniel agrees to join Madison's mission to find Alicia using Troy's daughter Tracy, but Strand realizes that Daniel is hoping to use Tracy to get revenge against Troy for Ofelia's death. Tracy proves to be lying about Alicia's location and Madison decides to kill her in order to keep PADRE's location a secret, but Tracy escapes. Daniel and Madison realize that Troy intends to attack PADRE with an army of the dead, just like he did with Broke Jaw Ranch. Madison chooses to go after Troy alone rather than risking anyone else that she cares about.

In "Fighting Like You," Daniel and Luciana rescue Madison and Troy from Ben Krennick, but Madison stops them from killing Troy in revenge for his actions as Troy has agreed to lead them to where Russell is taking the herd. The two later lead Strand and Alicia's group to where Troy has saved Madison's life after they nearly died in the swamp. A remorseful Troy leads the group to the herd, allowing them to stop it, but Daniel continues to advocate for killing Troy rather than giving him another chance. Ultimately, Madison kills Troy by impaling him with Alicia's prosthetic arm, but not before Troy claims that Tracy is actually Alicia's daughter whom he had kidnapped.

In "The Road Ahead," Daniel explodes at Madison and Strand over the danger that they keep putting his family in and Madison's increasingly violent and unstable behavior to the point that Daniel regrets even helping Travis the night that everything went bad. When PADRE falls, Daniel and Luciana are too far away to help, but Madison saves everyone, seemingly at the cost of her own life. In the aftermath, as everyone goes their separate ways, Daniel admits that his distrust of Strand is because Strand reminds Daniel too much of the worst parts of himself and he's afraid that people like them can never change. Tired of war, Daniel finally makes peace with Strand and they part as friends. As Daniel prepares to leave with Luciana, he's reunited with his long-lost cat Skidmark, much to Daniel's delight and confusion as to how Skidmark had found him again after over seven years. Unbeknownst to Daniel, Alicia had found the cat on her travels and had discreetly returned Skidmark to her old friend, deciding along with Madison to allow their friends to continue to think that they're dead.

== Development and reception ==
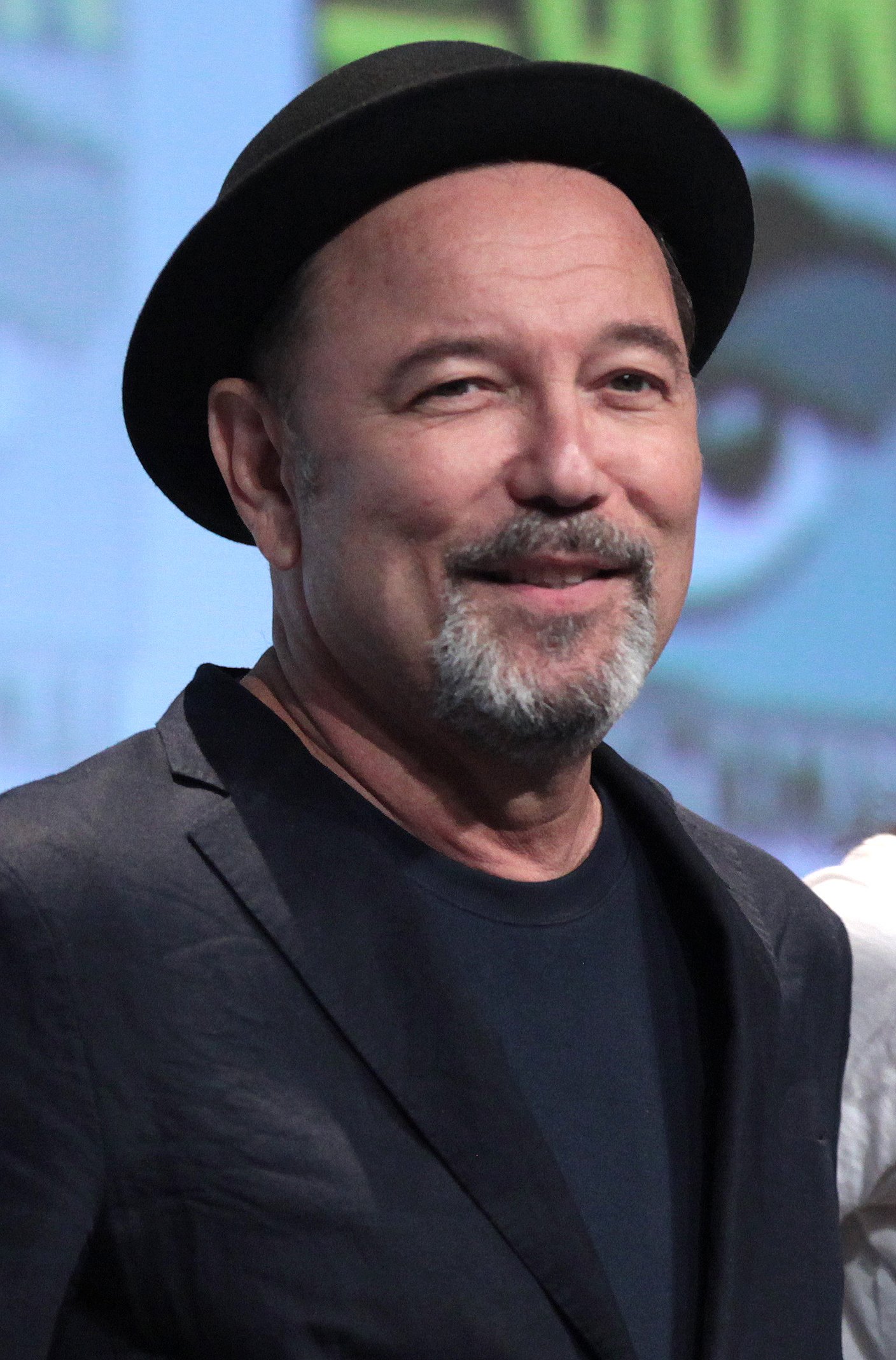
Rubén Blades (pictured) has received critical acclaim for his portrayal of Daniel.

Daniel has been widely considered to be one of the series' best characters and Blades' performance has been lauded by critics and fans alike. Daniel made his debut in "So Close, Yet So Far". Daniel returns in the third-season episode "TEOTWAWKI" after being presumed dead, Matt Fowler for IGN stated, "The return of Daniel in that closing beat was a nice touch and I'm happy to see Rubén Blades back on the show."

The third-season episode "100" which centered around Daniel, received critical acclaim. Matt Fowler of IGN gave the episode a 9/10 rating, stating; "'100' felt fresh and immediate and for the first time, even though it only focused in on one main character, Fear the Walking Dead felt wholly like its own unique endeavor. The same universe as the original series, sure, but with vitally different perspectives, angles, and objectives. It kind of answered that recurring question "Why have another Walking Dead show?" as Daniel was constantly saved while also constantly being placed in situations where he was called upon to do harm to innocent people. People who he even owned a great debt to. It was stunning and Ruben Blades was mesmerizing."

In December 2018, it was reported that Rubén Blades would return in season 5 as Daniel Salazar. In the season premiere episode, Daniel makes a second return to the show after being presumed dead in season three's finale.
