= List of awards and nominations received by Colman Domingo =

Colman Domingo awards and nominations
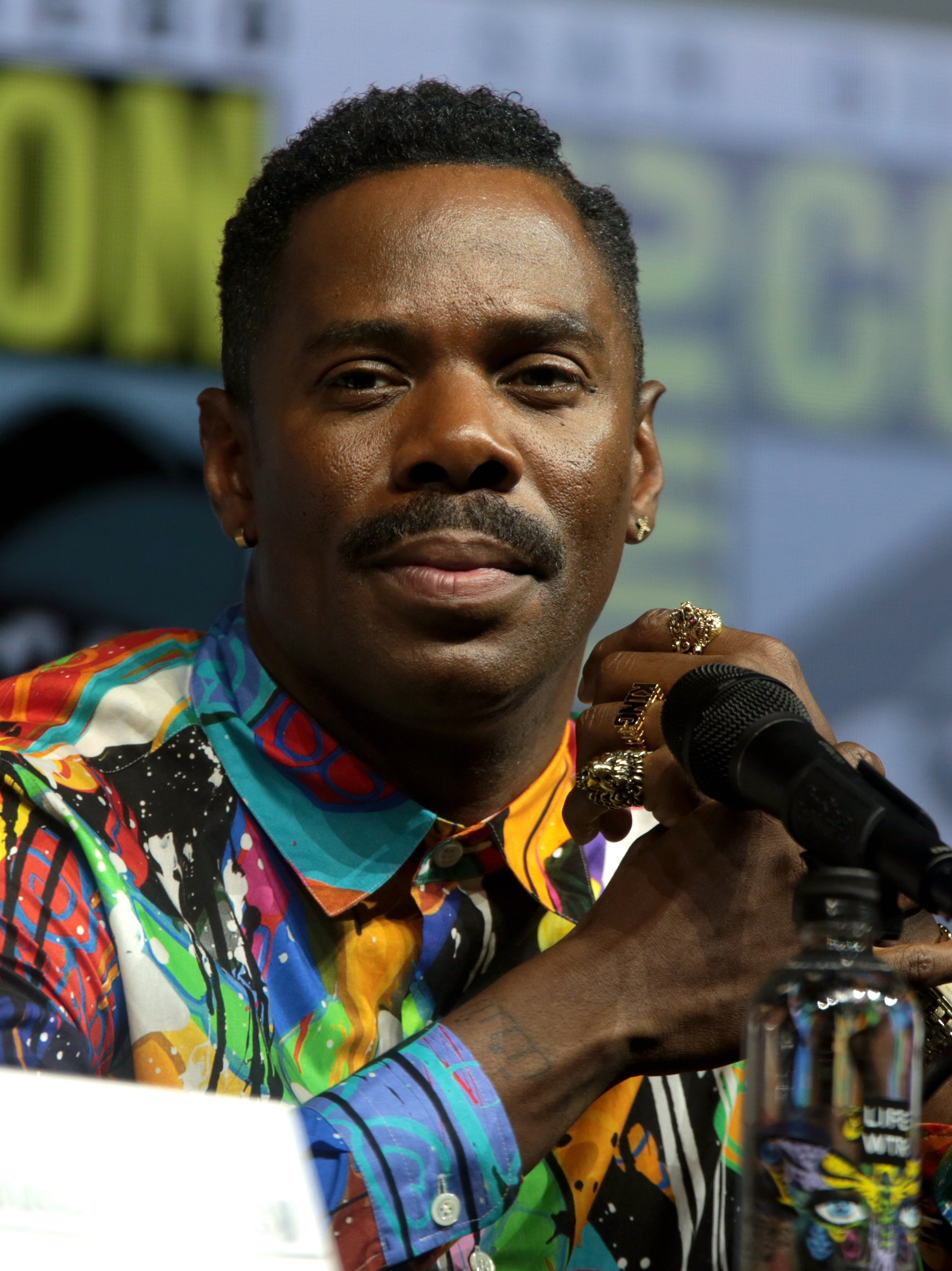
- Domingo at San Diego Comic-Con in 2018
Awards and nominations
Award	Wins	Nominations
Academy Awards	0	2
BAFTA Awards	0	2
Critics' Choice	0	5
Emmy Awards	1	4
Golden Globes	0	2
Olivier Awards	0	1
SAG Awards	0	4
Tony Awards	0	2

Totals (Note: Certain award groups do not simply award one winner. They acknowledge several different recipients, have runners-up, and have third place. Since this is a specific recognition and is different from losing an award, runner-up mentions are considered wins in this award tally. For simplification and to avoid errors, each award in this list has been presumed to have had a prior nomination.)
- Wins: 46
- Nominations: 146

Colman Domingo—an American actor, playwright and director of stage and screen—has received a Primetime Emmy Award as well as nominations for two Academy Awards, two British Academy Film Awards, five Critics' Choice Movie Awards, two Golden Globe Awards, a Laurence Olivier Award, four Screen Actors Guild Awards, and two Tony Awards.

Domingo started his career on stage, acting in several Off-Broadway and Broadway productions. For his performance on A Boy and His Soul he received a Lucille Lortel Award in 2010. Later he was cast in The Scottsboro Boys by Susan Stroman, receiving nominations at the 65th Tony Awards for Best Featured Actor in a Musical.

In 2020, for his role in Ma Rainey's Black Bottom he received Screen Actors Guild Award and Independent Spirit Award nominations. In 2022, Domingo has received a Primetime Emmy Award for Outstanding Guest Actor in a Drama Series for his role as a drug addict in HBO series Euphoria and a nomination for the Independent Spirit Award for Best Supporting Male for his performance as an abusive pimp in Zola.

Domingo received consecutive nominations in 2023 and 2024 for the Academy Award for Best Actor for his portrayals of civil rights activist Bayard Rustin in the biopic Rustin and a prison inmate named John "Divine G" Whitfield in the drama Sing Sing.

== Major associations ==
=== Academy Awards ===
Year	Category	Nominated work	Result	Ref.
2023	Best Actor	Rustin	Nominated	
2024	Best Actor	Sing Sing	Nominated	

=== BAFTA Awards ===
Year	Category	Nominated work	Result	Ref.
British Academy Film Awards
2023	Best Actor in a Leading Role	Rustin	Nominated	
2024	Best Actor in a Leading Role	Sing Sing	Nominated	

=== Critics' Choice Awards ===
Year	Category	Nominated work	Result	Ref.
Critics' Choice Movie Awards
2020	Best Acting Ensemble	Ma Rainey's Black Bottom	Nominated	
2023	Best Actor	Rustin	Nominated	
2023	Best Acting Ensemble	The Color Purple	Nominated	
2024	Best Actor	Sing Sing	Nominated	
2024	Best Acting Ensemble	Sing Sing	Nominated	

=== Emmy Awards ===
Year	Category	Nominated work	Result	Ref.
Primetime Emmy Awards
2022	Outstanding Guest Actor in a Drama Series	Euphoria (episode: "Ruminations: Big and Little Bullys")	Won	
2025	Outstanding Supporting Actor in a Comedy Series	The Four Seasons	Nominated	
2026	Outstanding Supporting Actor in a Comedy Series	The Four Seasons	Nominated	
2026	Outstanding Guest Actor in a Drama Series	Euphoria (episode: "In God We Trust")	Nominated	

=== Golden Globe Awards ===
Year	Category	Nominated work	Result	Ref.
2023	Best Actor – Motion Picture Drama	Rustin	Nominated	
2024	Best Actor – Motion Picture Drama	Sing Sing	Nominated	

=== Laurence Olivier Awards ===
Year	Category	Nominated work	Result	Ref.
2014	Best Supporting Role in a Musical	The Scottsboro Boys	Nominated	

=== Screen Actors Guild Awards ===
Year	Category	Nominated work	Result	Ref.
2020	Outstanding Cast in a Motion Picture	Ma Rainey's Black Bottom	Nominated	
2023	Outstanding Cast in a Motion Picture	The Color Purple	Nominated	
2023	Outstanding Actor in a Leading Role	Rustin	Nominated	
2024	Outstanding Actor in a Leading Role	Sing Sing	Nominated	

=== Tony Awards ===
Year	Category	Nominated work	Result	Ref.
2011	Best Featured Actor in a Musical	The Scottsboro Boys	Nominated	
2023	Best Play	Fat Ham	Nominated	

== Other awards ==
Organizations	Year	Category	Work	Result	Ref.
Astra Film Awards	2023	Best Short Film	North Star	Nominated	
Astra Film Awards	2024	Best Actor	Rustin	Nominated	
Astra Film Awards	2024	Best Supporting Actor	The Color Purple	Nominated	
Astra Film Awards	2024	Best Cast Ensemble	The Color Purple	Won	
Astra Film Awards	2025	Best Actor	Sing Sing	Nominated	
BET Awards	2024	Best Actor	Rustin, The Color Purple	Nominated	
BET Awards	2025	Best Actor	Himself	Nominated	
BET Awards	2026	Best Actor	Himself	Nominated	
BET Awards	2026	Fashion Vanguard Award	Himself	Nominated	
Black Reel Awards	2010	Best Ensemble	Passing Strange	Nominated	
Black Reel Awards	2015	Best Ensemble	Selma	Won	
Black Reel Awards	2022	Outstanding Supporting Actor	Zola	Won	
Black Reel Awards	2024	Outstanding Lead Performance	Rustin	Nominated	
Black Reel Awards	2024	Outstanding Supporting Performance	The Color Purple	Nominated	
Black Reel Awards	2024	Outstanding Supporting Performance in a Drama Series	Fear the Walking Dead	Nominated	
Black Reel Awards	2024	Chadwick Boseman Vanguard Award	Himself	Honored	
Black Reel Awards	2025	Outstanding Lead Performance	Sing Sing	Nominated	
Black Reel Awards	2025	Outstanding Lead Performance in a TV Movie or Limited Series	The Madness	Nominated	
Black Reel Awards	2025	Outstanding Supporting Performance in a Comedy Series	The Four Season	Nominated	
Black Reel Awards	2025	Outstanding Directing in a Comedy Series	The Four Season	Nominated	
Gotham Awards	2022	Outstanding Supporting Performance	Zola	Nominated	
Gotham Awards	2024	Outstanding Lead Performance	Sing Sing	Won	
Gotham Awards	2024	Social Justice Award	Sing Sing	Won	
Independent Spirit Awards	2020	Best Supporting Male	Ma Rainey's Black Bottom	Nominated	
Independent Spirit Awards	2021	Best Supporting Male	Zola	Nominated	
Independent Spirit Awards	2025	Best Lead Performance	Sing Sing	Nominated	
NAACP Image Awards	2021	Outstanding Supporting Actor in a Motion Picture	Ma Rainey's Black Bottom	Nominated	
NAACP Image Awards	2021	Outstanding Ensemble Cast in a Motion Picture	Ma Rainey's Black Bottom	Won	
NAACP Image Awards	2023	Outstanding Guest Performance in a TV Series	Euphoria	Nominated	
NAACP Image Awards	2024	Outstanding Supporting Actor in a Motion Picture	The Color Purple	Won	
NAACP Image Awards	2024	Outstanding Ensemble Cast in a Motion Picture	The Color Purple	Won	
NAACP Image Awards	2024	Outstanding Lead Actor in a Motion Picture	Rustin	Won	
NAACP Image Awards	2024	Outstanding Ensemble Cast in a Motion Picture	Rustin	Nominated	
NAACP Image Awards	2024	Entertainer of the Year	Himself	Nominated	
NAACP Image Awards	2025	Outstanding Actor in a Motion Picture	Sing Sing	Nominated	
NAACP Image Awards	2025	Outstanding Actor in a Television Movie, Mini-Series or Dramatic Special	The Madness	Nominated	
NAACP Image Awards	2026	Outstanding Supporting Actor in a Comedy Series	The Four Seasons	Nominated	
NAACP Image Awards	2026	Outstanding Directing in a Comedy Series	The Four Seasons	Nominated	
NAACP Image Awards	2026	Outstanding Ensemble Cast in a Motion Picture	Wicked: For Good	Nominated	
Satellite Awards	2024	Best Actor in a Motion Picture –Drama	Rustin	Nominated	
Satellite Awards	2025	Best Actor in a Motion Picture –Drama	Sing Sing	Won	

== Theatre awards ==
Year	Association	Category	Nominated work	Result	Ref.
2008	Obie Award	Performance	Passing Strange	Won	
2008	Connecticut Critics Circle Award	Outstanding Actor in a Play	Coming Home	Won	
2010	Drama Desk Award	Outstanding Solo Performance	A Boy and His Soul	Nominated	
2010	Drama League Award	Distinguished Performance	A Boy and His Soul	Nominated	
2010	Lucille Lortel Award	Outstanding Solo Show	A Boy and His Soul	Won	
2011	Fred and Adele Astaire Award	Outstanding Male Dancer	The Scottsboro Boys	Nominated	
2014	Whatsonstage.com Awards	Best Supporting Actor in a Musical	The Scottsboro Boys	Nominated	
2017	NAACP Theatre Award	Best Director of a Play, Larger Theatre	Barbecue	Nominated	
2018	IRNE Award	Best Director of a Play, Large Stage	A Guide for the Homesick	Nominated	
2018	Barrymore Awards for Excellence in Theater	Outstanding Overall Production of a Musical	Lights Out: Nat "King" Cole	Nominated	
2018	Barrymore Awards for Excellence in Theater	Outstanding New Play/Musical	Lights Out: Nat "King" Cole	Nominated	
2018	Drama League Award	Outstanding Production of a Broadway or Off-Broadway Musical	Summer: The Donna Summer Musical	Nominated	
2019	NAACP Theatre Award	Best Playwright, Larger Theatre	Summer: The Donna Summer Musical	Nominated	

== Additional awards ==
Year	Association	Category	Nominated work	Result	Ref.
2010	Black Reel Award	Best Ensemble	Passing Strange	Nominated	
2014	San Diego Film Critics Society	Best Ensemble	Selma	Nominated	
2014	Washington D.C. Area Film Critics Association	Best Ensemble	Selma	Nominated	
2015	Black Reel Award	Best Ensemble	Selma	Won	
2018	ITVFest (Independent Television Festival)	Best Drama Actor	Nothingman	Won	
2018	Newport Beach Film Festival	Artist of Distinction Award		Won	
2020	Boston Society of Film Critics Award	Best Ensemble Cast	Ma Rainey's Black Bottom	Won	
2020	NAACP Image Award	Outstanding Ensemble Cast in a Motion Picture	Ma Rainey's Black Bottom	Won	
2020	Florida Film Critics Circle Award	Best Ensemble	Ma Rainey's Black Bottom	Nominated	
2020	NAACP Image Award	Outstanding Supporting Actor in a Motion Picture	Ma Rainey's Black Bottom	Nominated	
2021	Hollywood Critics Association Awards	Best Actor in a Limited Series, Anthology Series, or Television Movie	"Trouble Don't Last Always"	Won	
2021	Imagen Awards	Best Supporting Actor – Television (Drama)	"Trouble Don't Last Always"	Won	
2021	Gotham Awards	Outstanding Supporting Performance	Zola	Nominated	
2021	Chicago Film Critics Association Awards	Chicago Film Critics Association Award for Best Supporting Actor	Zola	Nominated	
2022	Austin Film Critics Association Awards	Best Supporting Actor	Zola	Nominated	
2022	Black Reel Awards	Outstanding Supporting Actor	Zola	Won	
2022	Georgia Film Critics Association	Best Supporting Actor	Zola	Nominated	
2022	Seattle Film Critics Society Awards	Best Supporting Actor	Zola	Nominated	
2022	Saturn Awards	Best Actor in a Network or Cable Television Series	Fear the Walking Dead	Nominated	
2022	NHMC Impact Awards Gala	Impact Award for Best Performance in a Drama	Euphoria	Won	
2023	TIFF Tribute Awards	Actor Award	Rustin, Sing Sing	Won	
2023	Columbus Film Critics Association	Actor of the Year (for an exemplary body of work)	Rustin, The Color Purple, Ruby Gillman, Teenage Kraken, Transformers: Rise of the Beasts	Nominated	
2023	Indiana Film Journalists Association	Best Lead Performance	Rustin	Nominated	
2023	Columbus Film Critics Association	Best Lead Performance	Rustin	Nominated	
2023	Dallas–Fort Worth Film Critics Association	Best Actor	Rustin	Nominated	
2023	Women Film Critics Circle	Best Actor	Rustin	Nominated	
2023	Georgia Film Critics Association	Best Actor	Rustin	Nominated	
2023	Washington D.C. Area Film Critics Association Awards	Best Actor	Rustin	Nominated	
2023	San Diego Film Critics Society	Best Actor	Rustin	Nominated	
2023	Las Vegas Film Critics Society	Best Actor	Rustin	Nominated	
2023	North Carolina Film Critics Association	Best Actor	Rustin	Nominated	
2023	Newport Beach Film Festival	Outstanding Performance Award	Rustin	Won	
2023	Santa Barbara International Film Festival	Virtuoso Award	Rustin	Won	
2023	Palm Springs International Film Festival	Spotlight Award	Rustin	Won	
2023	Celebration of Cinema and Television	Best Actor	Rustin	Won	
2023	Astra Film and Creative Awards	Best Actor	Rustin	Nominated	
2023	Black Reel Awards	Best Lead Performance	Rustin	Nominated	
2023	Capri Hollywood International Film Festival	Best Actor	Rustin	Won	
2023	Astra Film and Creative Awards	Best Supporting Actor	The Color Purple	Nominated	
2023	Astra Film and Creative Awards	Best Ensemble	The Color Purple	Won	
2023	Celebration of Cinema and Television	Best Ensemble	The Color Purple	Won	
2023	Columbus Film Critics Association	Best Ensemble	The Color Purple	Nominated	
2023	Black Reel Awards	Best Supporting Performance	The Color Purple	Nominated	
2024	Black Reel Award	Chadwick Boseman Vanguard Award	Rustin, The Color Purple	Won	
2024	London Film Critics' Circle	Derek Malcolm Award For Innovation	Rustin, The Color Purple	Won	
2024	AARP Movies for Grownups Awards	Best Actor	Rustin	Won	
2024	AARP Movies for Grownups Awards	Best Supporting Actor	The Color Purple	Nominated	
2024	African-American Film Critics Association Awards	Best Actor	Rustin	Won	
2024	Dorian Awards	LGBTQIA+ Film Trailblazer Award "For creating art that inspires empathy, truth and equity"		Won	
2024	Dorian Awards	Film Performance of the Year	Rustin	Nominated	
2024	Satellite Awards	Best Actor – Motion Picture Drama	Rustin	Nominated	
2025	Chicago Film Critics Association	Best Actor	Sing Sing	Nominated	
2025	Online Film Critics Society	Best Actor	Sing Sing	Nominated	
2025	Dorian Awards	Film Performance of the Year	Sing Sing	Nominated	
2025	Chicago Indie Critics	Best Actor	Sing Sing	Nominated	
2025	Denver Film Critics Society	Best Lead Performance by an Actor, Male	Sing Sing	Nominated	
2025	Vancouver Film Critics Circle	Best Lead Performance	Sing Sing	Nominated	
2025	Portland Critics Association	Best Lead Performance (Male)	Sing Sing	Nominated	
2025	Indiana Film Journalists Association	Best Lead Performance	Sing Sing	Nominated	
2025	San Diego Film Critics Society	Best Actor	Sing Sing	Won	
2025	Las Vegas Film Critics Society	Best Actor	Sing Sing	Nominated	
2025	Michigan Movie Critics Guild	Best Actor	Sing Sing	Nominated	
2025	New York Film Critics Online	Actor	Sing Sing	Nominated	
2025	Atlanta Film Critics Circle	Best Ensemble	Sing Sing	Won	
2025	Hollywood Creative Alliance's (HCA) The Astra Awards	Best Actor	Sing Sing	Nominated	
2025	Washington DC Area Film Critics Association	Best Actor	Sing Sing	Won	
2025	St. Louis Film Critics Association	Best Actor	Sing Sing	Won	
2025	Boston Society of Film Critics	Best Ensemble	Sing Sing	Won	
2025	Seattle Film Critics Society	Lead Actor	Sing Sing	Won	
2025	San Francisco Bay Area Film Critics Circle	Best Actor	Sing Sing	Won	
2025	African American Film Critics Association	Best Actor	Sing Sing	Won	
2025	Phoenix Critics Circle	Best Actor	Sing Sing	Nominated	
2025	Alliance of Women Film Journalists	Best Actor	Sing Sing	Won	
2025	National Society of Film Critics	Best Actor	Sing Sing	Won	
2026	Frameline Film Festival	The Variety Creative Conscience Award		Honored	
