= Colman Domingo on screen and stage =

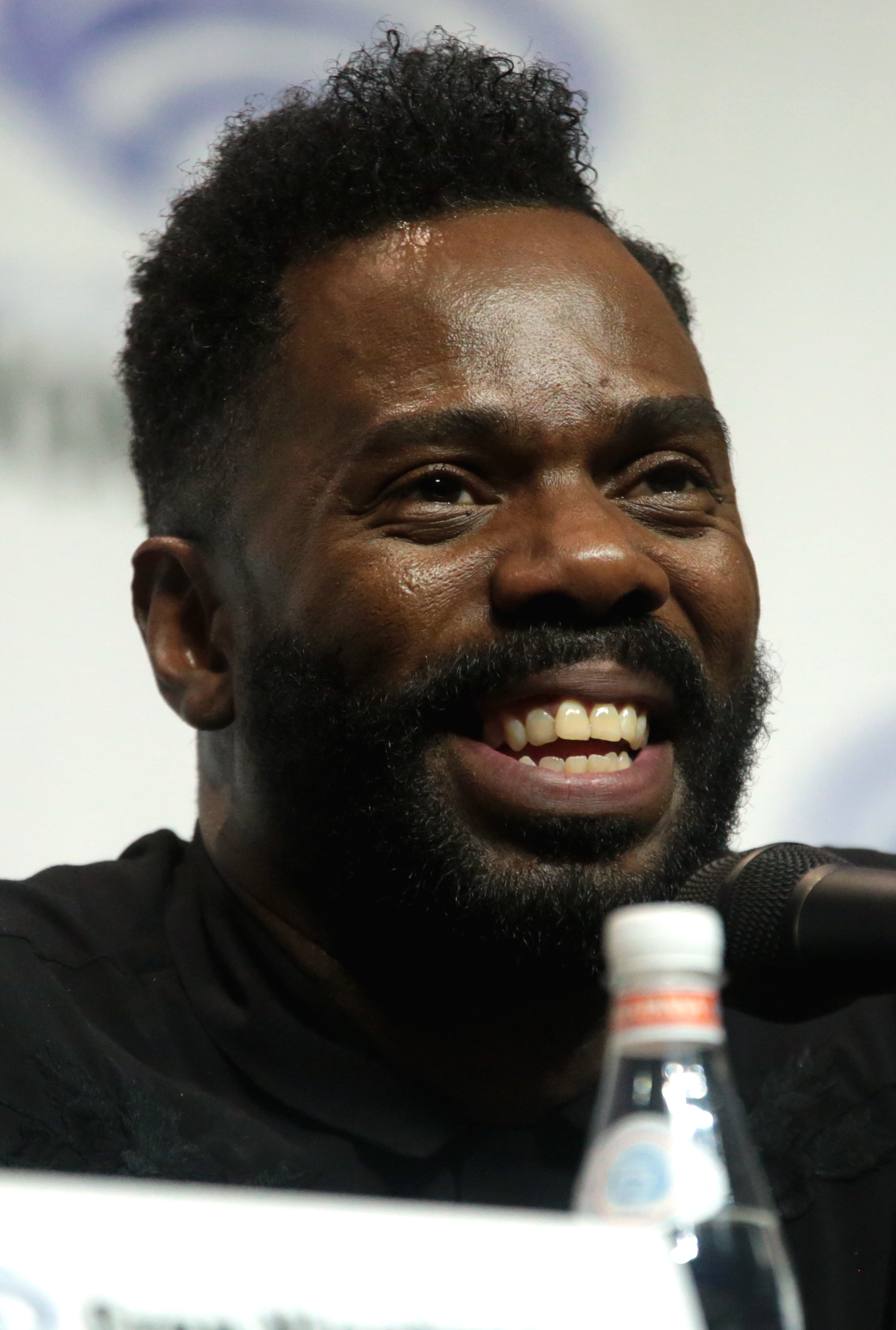
Domingo in 2018

Colman Domingo is an American actor, playwright, and director.

Domingo rose to prominence for his role on the sketch series The Big Gay Sketch Show from 2008 to 2010 and as Victor Strand in the AMC series Fear the Walking Dead (2015–2023). During this time he also took minor roles in films such as Miracle at St. Anna (2008), Lincoln (2012), 42 (2013), Selma (2014), The Birth of a Nation (2016), and If Beale Street Could Talk (2018). He gained acclaim for his roles in Ma Rainey's Black Bottom (2020), Zola (2021), Rustin (2023), The Color Purple (2023), and Sing Sing (2023). He also took television roles in The Knick (2015), Lucifer (2016), Horace and Pete (2016), and The Twilight Zone (2020).

Domingo was nominated for the Academy Award for Best Actor for Rustin (2023) and Sing Sing (2023) and for the Golden Globe Award for Best Actor in a Motion Picture – Drama for Sing Sing (2024). He won the Primetime Emmy Award for Outstanding Guest Actor in a Drama Series for his role as a former drug addict in the HBO series Euphoria (2019–2026).

== Acting credits ==
Key
†	Denotes films that have not yet been released

=== Film ===
Year	Film	Role	Notes
1995	Timepiece	Khris	
1998	Around the Fire	Trace	
1999	King of the Bingo Game	Sonny	
1999	True Crime	Wally Cartwright	
2000	Desi's Looking for a New Girl	Mother	
2003	Kung Phooey!	Roy Lee	
2006	Freedomland	Male Patient	
2008	Miracle at St. Anna	West Indian Postal Customer	
2012	Lincoln	Private Harold Green	
2012	Red Hook Summer	Blessing Rowe	
2013	All Is Bright	Nzomo	
2013	42	Lawson Bowman	
2013	Hair Brained	Finals Moderator	
2013	The Butler	Freddie Fallows	
2014	400 Boys	Talon	
2014	Time Out of Mind	Mr. Oyello	
2014	Selma	Ralph Abernathy	
2015	Beautiful Something	Drew	
2016	The Birth of a Nation	Hark Turner	
2018	Assassination Nation	Principal Turrell	
2018	First Match	Coach Castile	
2018	If Beale Street Could Talk	Joseph Rivers	
2019	Lucy in the Sky	Frank Paxton	
2020	Zola	X	
2020	Ma Rainey's Black Bottom	Cutler	
2021	Without Remorse	Pastor West	
2021	The God Committee	Father Dunbar	
2021	Candyman	William Burke	
2023	Transformers: Rise of the Beasts	Unicron (voice)	
2023	Ruby Gillman, Teenage Kraken	Arthur Gillman (voice)	
2023	Rustin	Bayard Rustin	
2023	Sing Sing	John "Divine G" Whitfield	Also executive producer
2023	The Color Purple	Albert "Mister" Johnson	
2024	Drive-Away Dolls	Chief	
2025	The Electric State	Wolfe (voice)	
2025	Chapter 51	Christopher Demy	
2025	Dead Man's Wire	Fred Temple	
2025	The Running Man	Bobby Thompson	
2025	Wicked: For Good	Brrr / The Cowardly Lion (voice)	Cameo
2026	Michael	Joseph Jackson	
2026	Disclosure Day	Hugo Wakefield	
2027	An Innocent Girl †		Post-production
TBA	Lincoln in the Bardo †	Thomas Havens (voice)	Post-production
TBA	Lizard Music †	(voice)	Filming

=== Television ===
Year	Show	Role	Notes
1997	Nash Bridges	Reggie Harell	4 episodes
1999	Nash Bridges	Hassam	4 episodes
1999	Nash Bridges	Desmond Kenner	4 episodes
2000	Nash Bridges	Trumpet Player	4 episodes
2004	Law & Order	Ronald Gumer	Episode: "Hands Free"
2006	Law & Order: Criminal Intent	Sergeant Ev Sides	2 episodes
2006	Law & Order: Trial by Jury	Gus	Episode: "Eros in the Upper Eighties"
2008	Law & Order	Donnie	2 episodes
2008–2010	The Big Gay Sketch Show	Various	16 episodes
2009	Great Performances	Mr. Franklin/Mr. Venus/Joop	Episode: "Passing Strange"
2010	Law & Order: Criminal Intent	Andre Lanier	2 episodes
2015–2023	Fear the Walking Dead	Victor Strand	75 episodes Guest role (season 1); Main role (seasons 2–8)
2015	The Knick	Dr. Russell Daniels	Recurring role (season 2)
2016	Lucifer	Father Frank Lawrence	Episode: "Priest Walks Into a Bar"
2016	Horace and Pete	Dr. Evers	Episode: "Episode 8"
2017	Timeless	Bass Reeves	Episode: "The Murder of Jesse James"
2017	BoJack Horseman	Eddie the Dragonfly	Voice role; episode: "The Old Sugarman Place"
2018	American Dad!	Stiles	Voice role; episode: "(You Gotta) Strike for Your Right"
2019–2026	Euphoria	Ali Muhammad	Recurring role Starring (special episode: "Trouble Don't Last Always")
2020	The Twilight Zone	Carl	Episode: "Downtime"
2021	Cinema Toast	Barrington	Voice role; episode: "Kiss, Marry, Kill"
2023	You Are Here	Himself (host)	4 episodes
2024	The Madness	Muncie Daniels	Lead role
2025–present	Your Friendly Neighborhood Spider-Man	Norman Osborn (voice)	Main cast; 10 episodes
2025–present	The Four Seasons	Danny	Main cast
2025	RuPaul's Drag Race All Stars	Himself (guest judge)	Episode: "Murder on the Dance Floor"
2026	Saturday Night Live	Himself (host)	Episode: "Colman Domingo/Anitta"
2026	Jimmy Kimmel Live!	Himself (host)	4 episodes

=== Theater ===
Year	Title	Role	Playwright	Venue	Ref.
1994	Out of the Inkwell	The Brown Bomber		Theater Rhinoceros	
1995	Twelfth Night	Antonio	William Shakespeare	Theater Rhinoceros	
1995	Desk Set	Sadel	Phoebe Ephron	Theater Rhinoceros	
1996	Journey to the West	Dragon King	Wu Cheng'en	Berkeley Repertory Theatre; Huntington Theatre Company	
1997	Blade to the Heat	Garnet	Oliver Mayer	Thick Description	
1997	Hurricane	Ray	Erin Cressida Wilson	Campo Santo at New Langton Arts	
1997	Blues for an Alabama Sky	Guy	Pearl Cleage	TheatreWorks	
1997	A Midsummer Night's Dream	Oberon / Theseus	William Shakespeare	San Francisco Shakespeare Festival	
1998	Maleta Mulata	Barbarito	Jorge Ignacio Cortinas	Campo Santo, Intersection for the Arts	
1998	Up Jumped Springtime	Ensemble	Colman Domingo	Theater Rhinoceros	
1999	Romeo and Juliet	Mercutio	William Shakespeare	Shakespeare Santa Cruz	
1999	The Two Gentlemen of Verona	Speed	William Shakespeare	Shakespeare Santa Cruz	
2000	Fences	Gabriel	August Wilson	TheatreWorks	
2000	The Taming of the Shrew	Lucentio	William Shakespeare	California Shakespeare Theater	
2000	Sons of Don Juan	Fernandito	John PiRoman	San Jose Repertory Theatre	
2000	Love's Labour's Lost	Costard	William Shakespeare	California Shakespeare Theater	
2001	The Two Gentlemen of Verona	Speed	William Shakespeare	Geva Theatre Center	
2001	A Christmas Carol	Mr. Fezziwig	Charles Dickens	American Conservatory Theater	
2002	A Midsummer Night's Dream	Lysander	William Shakespeare	California Shakespeare Theater	
2002	Haroun and the Sea of Stories	Mr. Sengupta / Khatham Shud	Salman Rushdie	Berkeley Repertory Theatre	
2002	The Winter's Tale	Autolycus	William Shakespeare	California Shakespeare Theater	
2003	American Ma(u)l	Thomas Jefferson	Robert O'Hara	Culture Project/ 45 Bleeker	
2003	Henry V	Duke of Bourbon	William Shakespeare	Delacorte Theater	
2004	All's Well That Ends Well	Lavatch	William Shakespeare	California Shakespeare Theater	
2005	People's Temple	Eugene Smith, others	Leigh Fondakowski	Berkeley Repertory Theatre	
2005	A Boy and His Soul	Self	Colman Domingo	Thick Description	
2006	People's Temple	Eugene Smith, others	Leigh Fondakowski	Guthrie Theater	
2006	Passing Strange	Mr. Franklin/Mr. Venus	Stew	Berkeley Repertory Theatre	
2007	Passing Strange	Mr. Franklin/Mr. Venus	Stew	The Public Theater, Anspacher Theater	
2007	Well	Jim, others	Lisa Kron	Huntington Theatre	
2008	Passing Strange	Mr. Franklin/Mr. Venus	Stew	Broadway, Belasco Theatre	
2008	A Boy and His Soul	Self	Colman Domingo	Thick Description	
2009	Coming Home	Alfred Witbooy	Athol Fugard	Long Wharf Theatre	
2009	The Wiz	The Wiz	William F. Brown	New York City Center Encores!	
2009	A Boy and His Soul	Self	Colman Domingo	Vineyard Theatre	
2010	The Scottsboro Boys	Mr. Bones	David Thompson	Vineyard Theater	
2010	The Scottsboro Boys	Mr. Bones	David Thompson	Guthrie Theater	
2010	The Scottsboro Boys	Mr. Bones	David Thompson	Broadway, Lyceum Theatre	
2010–2011	Chicago	Billy Flynn	Fred Ebb / Bob Fosse	Broadway, Ambassador Theatre	
2011	Blood Knot	Zachariah Pietersen	Athol Fugard	Signature Theatre	
2012	Wild with Happy	Gil	Colman Domingo	The Public Theater, LuEsther Hall	
2013	Wild with Happy	Gil	Colman Domingo	TheatreWorks	
2013	A Boy and His Soul	Self	Colman Domingo	Tricycle Theatre	
2013	The Scottsboro Boys	Mr. Bones	David Thompson	The Young Vic	
2014	A Boy and His Soul	Self	Colman Domingo	Brisbane Powerhouse	
2014	Guys and Dolls	Rusty Charlie	Jo Swerling / Abe Burrows	Carnegie Hall	
2014	Nothing Personal	James Baldwin	James Baldwin	New York Live Arts, Live Ideas Festival	
2014–2015	The Scottsboro Boys	Mr. Bones	David Thompson	West End theatre, Garrick Theatre	
2019	A Raisin in the Sun	Walter Lee Younger (one night only)	Lorraine Hansberry	Broadway, American Airlines Theatre; Benefit Staged Reading	

=== Audio plays ===
Year	Project	Role	Notes
2023	The Riddler: Secrets in the Dark	Bruce Wayne / Batman	Scripted podcast
2024	Batman Unburied: Fallen City	Bruce Wayne / Batman	Scripted podcast

=== Music videos ===
Year	Title	Artist	Ref.
2025	"Tears"	Sabrina Carpenter	

=== Discography ===
Year	Title	Role	Artist	Ref.
2026	"Automatic"	"Spoken Word	Jessie Ware	

== Directing credits ==
=== Television ===
Year	Show	Season	Episode number	Episode name
2018	Fear the Walking Dead	Season 4	Episode 12	"Weak"
2019	Fear the Walking Dead	Season 5	Episode 3	"Humbug's Gulch"
2020	Fear the Walking Dead	Season 6	Episode 3	"Alaska"
2025	The Four Seasons	Season 1	Episode 6	"Ultimate Frisbee"
2026	The Four Seasons	Season 2	Episode 1	"Hiking"

=== Stage ===
Year	Title	Playwright	Venue
1998	Pieces of the Quilt – 3	Erin Cressida Wilson, Maria Irene Fornes, Herbert Siguenza; Greg Sarris, John Steppling, Migdalia Cruz, Rhodessa Jones	Solo Mio at Bayfront Theater
1999	Single Black Female	Lisa B. Thompson	Theatre Rhinoceros
2001	Rhinoceros	Eugène Ionesco	Theatre Rhinoceros
2004	Single Black Female	Lisa B. Thompson	Flight Theatre at the Complex Hollywood
2004	Once on This Island	Lynn Ahrens (book and lyrics) and Stephen Flaherty (music)	The College at Brockport, State University of New York at Geva Theatre Center
2006	Single Black Female	Lisa B. Thompson	New Professional Theatre at Peter JaySharp Theater Playwrights Horizons
2008	Single Black Female	Lisa B. Thompson	New Professional Theatre at The Duke on 42nd St New 42nd Street
2009	Exit Cuckoo	Lisa Ramirez	Working Theater at Clurman Theater at Theatre Row
2015	A Band of Angels	Myla Churchill	New York City Children's Theater
2015	Seven Guitars	August Wilson	Actors Theatre of Louisville
2016	Barbecue	Robert O'Hara	Geffen Playhouse
2017	A Guide for the Homesick	Ken Urban	Huntington Theatre Company
2019	Dot	Colman Domingo	People's Light and Theatre Company

== Writing credits ==
- Up Jumped Springtime (Premiered at Theatre Rhinoceros in San Francisco, 1998)
- A Boy and His Soul (Premiered at the Vineyard Theatre in New York City, 2009; earlier version of the play premiered at the Thick Description Theater in San Francisco in 2005, and produced in 2008 as a part of Thick Description's 20th Anniversary Season; produced as a one night only performance at Joe's Pub in New York City in 2008; produced in Tricycle Theatre in London, UK in 2013; produced at Brisbane Powerhouse in Brisbane, Australia, in 2014)
- Wild With Happy (Premiered at The Public Theater in New York City in 2012; produced at TheatreWorks in Menlo Park, CA, in 2013; produced at Baltimore Center Stage in 2014; produced at City Theatre (Pittsburgh) in Pittsburgh, PA, in 2017)
- Dot (Premiered at the Humana Festival of New American Plays in 2015; produced at the Vineyard Theatre in New York City in 2016; produced at Detroit Public Theatre in November 2016; produced at Everyman Theatre, Baltimore in December 2016; produced at New Venture Theatre in Baton Rouge, LA, in March 2017; produced at True Colors Theatre Company in Atlanta, GA, in April 2017; produced at St. Louis Black Repertory Theatre in St. Louis, MO, in September 2017; produced at PlayMakers Repertory Company in Chapel Hill, NC, in November 2017; produced at Park Square Theatre in St. Paul, MN, in November 2017; produced at The Billie Holiday Theatre in New York City in October 2018; produced at People's Light and Theatre Company in Malvern, PA in September 2019; produced at Soul Rep Theatre Company in Dallas, TX in December 2019)
- Summer: The Donna Summer Musical (book co-written with Robert Cary and Des McAnuff) (Premiered at La Jolla Playhouse in San Diego, CA, in November 2017; produced on Broadway at the Lunt-Fontanne Theatre with opening in Spring 2018)
- Lights Out: Nat "King" Cole (co-written with Patricia McGregor) (Produced at People's Light and Theatre Company in Malvern, PA, in September 2017; premiered on the West Coast in February 2019 at the Geffen Playhouse; premiered off-Broadway in 2025 at the New York Theatre Workshop)
