= Ruminations: Big and Little Bullys =

- Euphoria episode
- The girls in the bathroom.
- Episode no.: Season 2 Episode 3
- Directed by: Sam Levinson
- Written by: Sam Levinson
- Cinematography by: Marcell Rév
- Editing by: Laura Zempel
- Original air date: January 23, 2022
- Running time: 60 minutes

Guest appearances
- Alanna Ubach as Suze Howard; Paula Marshall as Marsha Jacobs; Elias Kacavas as Cal Jacobs; Henry Eikenberry as Derek; Martha Kelly as Laurie; Zak Steiner as Aaron Jacobs; Nick Blood as Gus Howard; Colman Domingo as Ali Muhamand

Episode chronology
← Previous "Out of Touch"	Next → "You Who Cannot See, Think of Those Who Can"
- Euphoria season 2

"Ruminations: Big and Little Bullys" is the third episode of the second season of the American teen drama television series Euphoria. The episode was written and directed by series creator Sam Levinson. It originally aired on HBO on January 23, 2022. The title of this episode is a reference to the 1999–2000 photogravure of the same name by American multi-media artist Robert Rauschenberg.

The episode's cold open introduces Cal Jacobs' (Eric Dane) teenage romance with another boy, which is cut short when he gets his future wife pregnant. In the episode proper, Cassie Howard (Sydney Sweeney) is isolated due to her obsession with Cal's son Nate (Jacob Elordi). Meanwhile, Rue Bennett (Zendaya) schemes to get drugs.

"Ruminations: Big and Little Bullys" received largely positive reviews. Out of the sixteen Primetime Emmy Award nominations received by the show for its second season, three was specifically for this episode. Sweeney was given an Outstanding Supporting Actress in a Drama Series nomination. Colman Domingo won Outstanding Guest Actor in a Drama Series for his role as Ali Muhamand and the "Call Me Irresponsible" routine won Outstanding Choreography.

== Plot ==
In 1994, childhood best friends Cal Jacobs (Eric Dane, 18-year old: Elias Kacavas) and Derek share a mutual, but unsaid, sexual attraction. Cal eventually begins a relationship with his classmate and future wife Marsha (Paula Marshall, 17-year old: Rebecca Louise). After graduation, Derek and Cal go to a gay bar, where they dance and share their first kiss. The next morning, Cal learns Marsha is pregnant. He feigns excitement on the phone to her, but begins to cry afterwards.

In the present, Rue Bennett (Zendaya) tricks her sister Gia (Storm Reid) into believing the only drug she has been using is cannabis. Later, Jules Vaughn (Hunter Schafer) interrogates Elliot (Dominic Fike) about his sexual orientation and if he intends to have sex with Rue. Elliot tells the girls he wants to be friends. Despite Jules's reservations, she, Elliot and Rue begin to spend more time together as a trio.

East Highland High School approves Lexi Howard (Maude Apatow) to put on a play she is writing about her life. Meanwhile, Cassie Howard (Sydney Sweeney) obsessively spends several hours every morning perfecting her appearance in order to impress Cal's son Nate (Jacob Elordi), who ignores her at school. He finally notices Cassie when her makeup and outfit match his ex-girlfriend Maddy Perez (Alexa Demie).

At school, Lexi begins posting audition flyers. In the bathroom, Kat Hernandez (Barbie Ferreira) and Maddy ask Cassie if she's auditioning for Oklahoma!, causing Cassie to have a mental breakdown. At dinner, Kat meets her boyfriend Ethan Daley's (Austin Abrams) parents for the first time. Due to stress, she embarrasses herself. Rue proposes to Laurie (Martha Kelly) to front her a $10,000 suitcase of drugs, supposedly to have her and her friends become drug runners. Laurie agrees, but threatens Rue with human trafficking if she fails to follow through with her plan.

Under the belief that he has a sex tape of him and Jules, Cal stalks Fezco O'Neill (Angus Cloud), but is caught by Ashtray (Javon Walton), who beats Cal with a shotgun. Fezco lets Cal go, and Cal inadvertently admits to Fezco that he had sex with Jules. At his house, Elliot flirts with Jules, while Rue brings the suitcase to her Narcotics Anonymous meeting. Aware that she's hiding something, Ali asks Rue what's inside; the two argue, and Ali is distraught when Rue taunts him about his distant relationship with his children. Rue goes home and takes fentanyl. Nate cancels plans with Cassie to rekindle his relationship with Maddy.

== Production ==
=== Writing ===
Robert Rauschenberg's intaglio photogravure print Ruminations: Big and Little Bullys, created between 1999 and 2000, is the origin of the episode's title. Rauschenberg is a parallel to the character of Cal, he was a gay man who left his wife. The piece also features Rauschenberg parents; Cal's homophobic father in the episode and serves as a wedge in his relationship with Derek. Mark Sloan, Dane's character in Grey's Anatomy, has a best friend named Derek, like Cal.

=== Filming ===
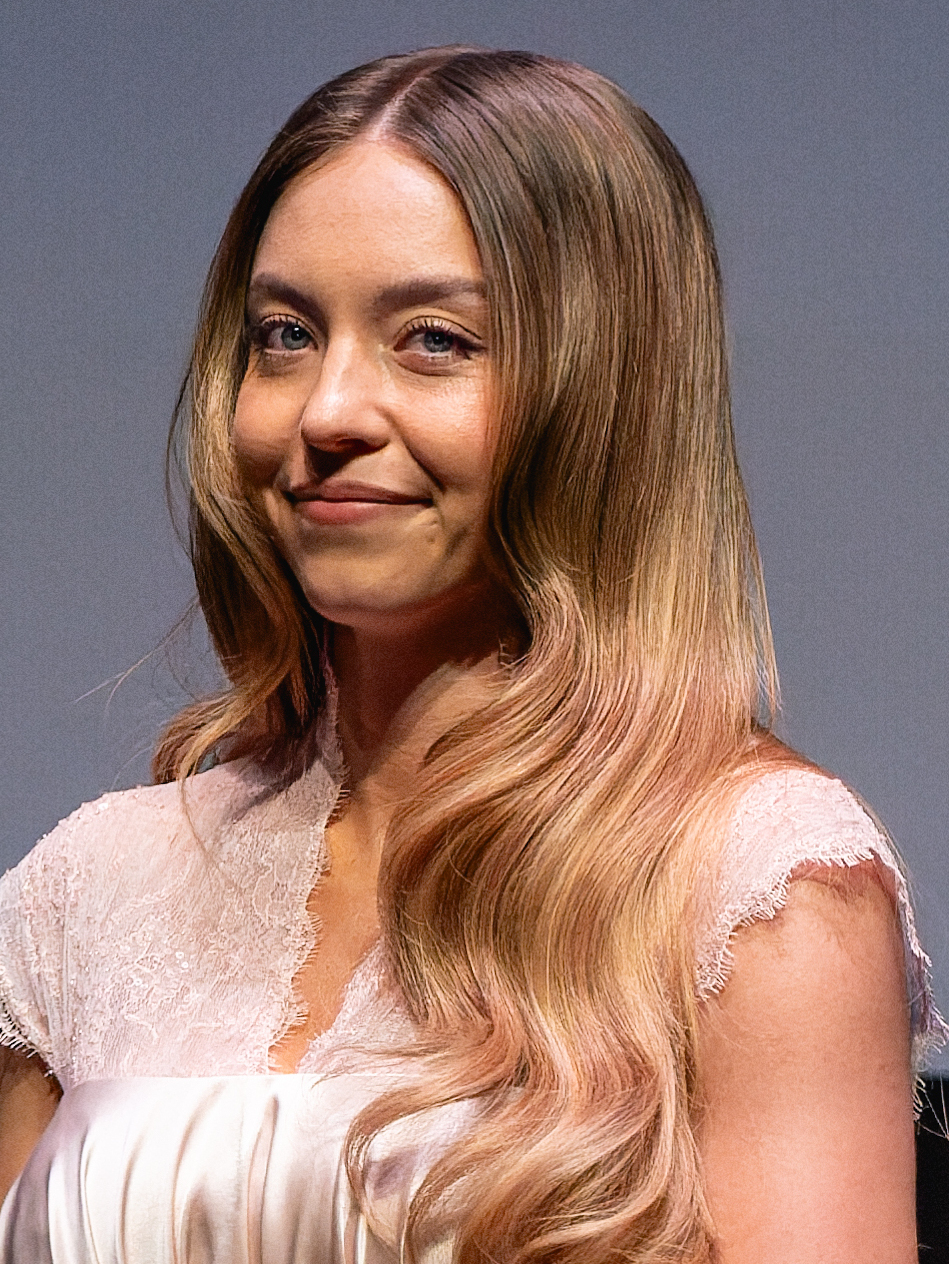
Sydney Sweeney was nominated for a Primetime Emmy Award for the episode.

Location shooting for gay bar Derek and Cal kiss at was filmed at Hideaway Country Bar and Grill in Sylmar, Los Angeles. Days before the episodes broadcast, Sweeney gave an interview with The Independent: “I’m very proud of my work in Euphoria. I thought it was a great performance. But no one talks about it because I got naked. I do The White Lotus and all of a sudden critics are paying attention. People are loving me. [...] there’s a stigma against actresses who get naked on screen. When a guy has a sex scene or shows his body, he still wins awards and gets praise. But the moment a girl does it, it’s completely different." Mam Smith, season 2's intimacy coordinator made sure Sweeney always felt comfortable on set. As did showrunner Sam Levinson, whom Sweeney called "amazing", saying “there are moments where Cassie was supposed to be shirtless and I would tell Sam, ‘I don’t really think that’s necessary here.’ He was like, ‘OK, we don’t need it’. I’ve never felt like Sam has pushed it on me or was trying to get a nude scene into an HBO show. When I didn’t want to do it, he didn’t make me."

=== Music ===
During the episode's cold open flashback, Derek and Cal are depicted celebrating graduation with Lenny Kravitz's song "It Ain't Over 'til It's Over". Later, "Never Tear Us Apart" by Australian rock band INXS appears, Cal dances and embraces his friend Derek to the song. While high, Rue is shown singing "Call Me Irresponsible" by Bobby Darin, dancing around her house to the song. Zendaya told Decider that the sequence is, "[Rue's] way of dealing with life and coping with it and trying to stay above water and be happy in the only way she knows how. I think that is a moment for her, when we live inside of her brain, that’s joyous and beautiful until we zoom out and remember what’s happening. There’s a very harsh reality to what’s happening to her.” "Watercolor Eyes" by Lana Del Rey was written for the episode and plays over the closing credits.

== Reception ==
=== Ratings ===
According to Nielsen Media Research, upon airing "Ruminations: Big and Little Bullys" was watched by 264,000 people. They estimated that 0.09% of the total 18-49 population in the US was tuning in. Including stats from streaming service HBO Max, the episode drew 3,600,000 viewers on its first day of release, higher than any previous episode. This was a 41 percent increase from the previous week.

=== Critical reviews ===
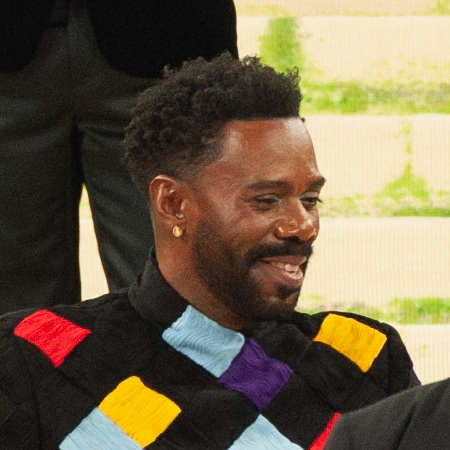
"Ruminations: Big and Little Bullys" won Colman Domingo a Primetime Emmy Award.

Review aggregator website Rotten Tomatoes gives the episode an approval score of 83%, based on 6 critical reviews. TVLine gave a "Performer of the Week" honorable mention to Sweeney on January 29, 2022 for her work in this episode. The site wrote "we're very worried about where Cassie's story is headed on the HBO teen drama, but we were also very impressed by Sydney Sweeney's boldly vulnerable portrayal this week, as Cassie's massive insecurities led to a bathroom freak-out for the ages." In a ranking of the first two seasons and specials, BuzzFeed listed "Ruminations: Big and Little Bullys" at four out of eighteen, writing: "This random, middle-of-the-season connector episode had NO REASON being as good as it is." IndieWire placed it at fifteenth in a list which included season three's premiere "Ándale", writing: "This chapter offers great comedic showcases for both Zendaya, in a slideshow “presentation” where Rue details how she gaslights the people around her, and Sweeney, in Cassie’s much parodied “I have never, ever been happier” restroom speech. That said, the lack of cohesion still weighs this episode way, way down."

The A.V. Club described the episode as "even more chaotic than usual", writing: "The prominence of Lexi, and exploration of Rue’s less desirable qualities were welcome. However, there was no connective tissue or structure between the various plot lines. Euphoria's famous quick cuts did not help, as the audience was not allowed to sit with any character. I worry about where the chaos will lead us." A staff writer at The Vanderbilt Hustler was positive on the episode, he wrote that it was "filled with self-aware humor".

Cassie's scene in the bathroom was met with praise by many critics. Teen Vogue called it the "funniest scene yet", reporting the reactions of fans who called it "camp" and praised the ensemble's performances. Brian Cox, who was at the time starring as Logan Roy on fellow popular HBO show Succession, parodied the scene on a March 14, 2022 appearance on Jimmy Kimmel Live!.

=== Accolades ===
The episode was Sweeney's submission at the 74th Primetime Emmy Awards, leading her to a nomination for the Primetime Emmy Award for Outstanding Supporting Actress in a Drama Series. Two of Euphoria's nominations at the 74th Primetime Creative Arts Emmy Awards were for the episode. They both ended in wins, Colman Domingo was given the Primetime Emmy Award for Outstanding Guest Actor in a Drama Series. Dancer and choreographer Ryan Heffington's work on Rue's intoxicated dance routine through her home, sound tracked to "Call Me Irresponsible", won him the Primetime Emmy Award for Outstanding Choreography. This was also his "Holding Out for a Hero" and Cheerleader choreography in "The Theater and Its Double".
