= People Like Us (Fear the Walking Dead) =

- Fear the Walking Dead episode
- Episode no.: Season 4 Episode 9
- Directed by: Magnus Martens
- Written by: Anna Fishko
- Original air date: August 12, 2018
- Running time: 44 minutes

Guest appearance
- Alexa Nisenson as Charlie

Episode chronology
← Previous "No One's Gone"	Next → "Close Your Eyes"
- Fear the Walking Dead (season 4)

"People Like Us" is the ninth episode and mid-season premiere of the fourth season of the post-apocalyptic horror television series Fear the Walking Dead, which aired on AMC on August 12, 2018 in the United States.

== Plot ==
Morgan decides to return to Virginia with the help of Althea, and asks the other members of the group to go with him. John, still recovering from his gunshot wound, intends on staying in Texas and returning to his cabin with June and Charlie (the three are currently living in a school bus). Meanwhile, Strand, Luciana and Alicia are living in a mansion. Strand spends most of his days intoxicated, Luciana is severely depressed, and Alicia is off on her own; none of them are interested in joining Morgan on his trip. Morgan helps Alicia, who is following a path of notes labeled "HELP", to someone who is possibly in need. The two kill more Infected and reach the source of the notes, only to find out that the person who was sending them has already died and turned. Disheartened, Alicia separates from Morgan and goes off on her own. Charlie flees the school bus, and John goes to Strand to ask for help in finding her. June confesses to Althea that she's scared John won't love her, because John fell in love with "Laura". Luciana catches Charlie in the mansion (who is returning a book that Nick had given her), but she runs off as a fierce storm begins to develop.

== Reception ==
"People Like Us" received mixed reviews from critics. On Rotten Tomatoes, "People Like Us" garnered a 64% rating with an average score of 8/10 based on 9 reviews. The sites critical consensus reads; "It's hard to be too upset that the characters have settled into monotonous patterns when 'People Like Us' heralds the early stages of a whirling zombie-nado."

=== Ratings ===
The episode was seen by 1.88 million viewers in the United States on its original air date, far below the previous episodes ratings of 2.32 million viewers.
