= The Code (Fear the Walking Dead) =

- Fear the Walking Dead episode
- Episode no.: Season 4 Episode 11
- Directed by: Tara Nicole Weyr
- Written by: Andrew Chambliss; Alex Delyle
- Original air date: August 26, 2018
- Running time: 48 minutes

Guest appearances
- Tonya Pinkins as Martha; Aaron Stanford as Jim Brauer; Daryl Mitchell as Wendell Rabinowitz; Mo Collins as Sarah Rabinowitz

Episode chronology
← Previous "Close Your Eyes"	Next → "Weak"
- Fear the Walking Dead (season 4)

"The Code" is the eleventh episode of the fourth season of the post-apocalyptic horror television series Fear the Walking Dead, which aired on AMC on August 26, 2018 in the United States.

== Plot ==
Morgan takes refuge from the storm inside a semi-truck and takes supplies from a box labelled with "Take what you need. Leave what you don't". After falling asleep inside the truck, he wakes up to discover he is at a gas station in Mississippi. Inside the gas station, Morgan hears a woman's voice on the radio transmitter who tells him to take any supplies he needs. Morgan is then approached by a wheelchair user named Wendell with a shotgun and his adopted sister Sarah. Wendell and Sarah explain that they are the ones leaving the supplies for other survivors. Morgan starts driving back to Texas to search for his friends, but decides to turn around. On his way back, Morgan saves a man, Jim, who is being attacked by the Infected. Jim tells Morgan he was kidnapped. Morgan and Jim meet up with Wendell and Sarah, and Jim recognizes Sarah as his kidnapper. Morgan and Jim are then held captive by them. Wendell and Sarah want the location of Morgan's community in Virginia. Jim cuts a deal with Wendell and Sarah, and they leave Morgan, who is trapped by a herd of Infected. After escaping, Morgan rejoins the group in their truck and they agree to save Morgan's friends in Texas in exchange for the location of his community in Virginia. The mysterious woman hears Morgan's message on the radio, and tells an Infected impaled to wall, that they're going to Texas.

== Reception ==
"The Code" received mostly positive from critics. On Rotten Tomatoes, "The Code" garnered an 86% rating with an average score of 7.17/10 based on 7 reviews.

=== Ratings ===
The episode was seen by 1.83 million viewers in the United States on its original air date, slightly below the previous episodes ratings of 1.86 million viewers.
