= Close Your Eyes (Fear the Walking Dead) =

- Fear the Walking Dead episode
- Episode no.: Season 4 Episode 10
- Directed by: Michael E. Satrazemis
- Written by: Shintaro Shimosawa
- Original air date: August 19, 2018
- Running time: 42 minutes

Guest appearance
- Alexa Nisenson as Charlie

Episode chronology
← Previous "People Like Us"	Next → "The Code"
- Fear the Walking Dead (season 4)

"Close Your Eyes" is the tenth episode of the fourth season of the post-apocalyptic horror television series Fear the Walking Dead. It aired on AMC on August 19, 2018 in the United States. The episode received critical acclaim for its cinematography, writing, and Alycia Debnam-Carey's performance as Alicia Clark.

== Plot ==
Alicia takes refuge in a house to escape the storm. She kills the Infected family and puts their bodies outside. She hears an intruder in the house, which is Charlie, who locks herself in an upstairs bedroom. Alicia guilts Charlie about killing Nick, telling her she'll have to live with it for the rest of her life, which brings Charlie to tears. Alicia orders Charlie to help her hammer the window shutters closed, but stops once the noise begins to attract more Infected. Back inside, Alicia discovers Charlie has a gun, which Alicia keeps. The two eat dinner, and Charlie asks Alicia many questions about her past. The storm begins to intensify and a window shatters. They flee to the basement, which has flooded, and debris collapses on the basement door, trapping them. They try to escape through the exterior doors, but it's locked from the outside. Believing they will soon drown, Charlie begs Alicia to kill her so she will not turn like her parents did. Alicia contemplates it, but refuses. An Infected impaled on a tree branch falls and breaks the lock, allowing them to escape. They drive to the mansion to look for Strand and Luciana, but the house is empty and in ruins. They also discover John and June's bus overturned on the bridge, and Alicia wonders if they are all dead.

== Reception ==
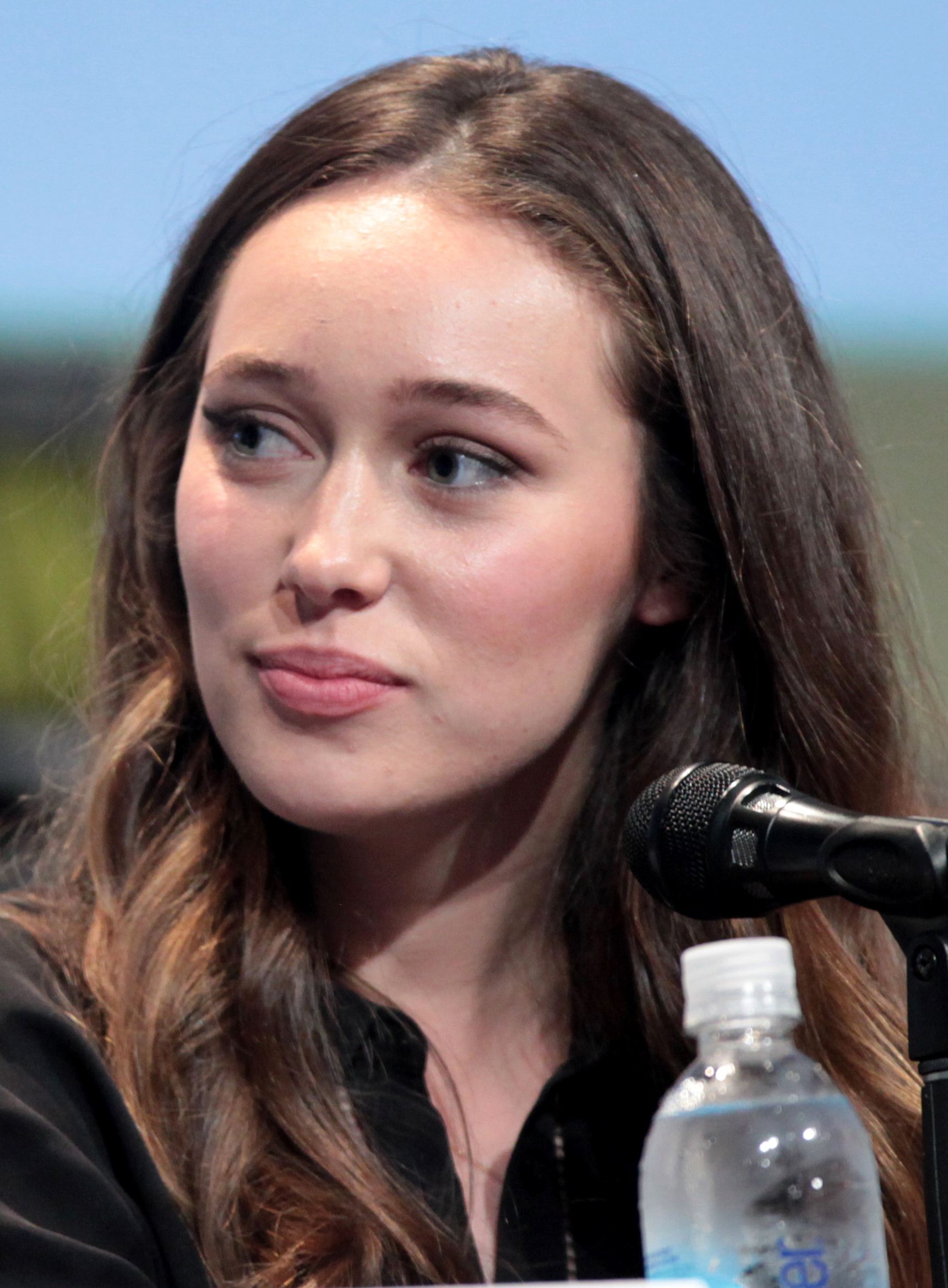
Alycia Debnam-Carey (Alicia Clark) received critical acclaim for the Alicia-centered episode.

"Close Your Eyes" garnered critical acclaim, with Alycia Debnam-Carey's portrayal of Alicia Clark receiving particular praise. On Rotten Tomatoes, it garnered a 100% approval rating with an average score of 8.80/10 based on 11 reviews. Laura Bradley of Vanity Fair stated the episode was Debnam-Carey’s "most powerful performance yet, one that proved Alicia still has a lot of story left" and "can also still be the most fascinating to watch". Forbes's Paul Tassi considered it a "fantastic" episode anchored by Debnam-Carey, stating that "in Alicia she's created one of the most impressive, memorable characters in the entire Walking Dead universe across either show." CarterMatt.com said "Close Your Eyes" provided "a chance to dive into Alicia’s head like never before as she continued much of her isolation from the world" and Debnam-Carey gave an "outstanding" performance. ComicBook.com's Brandon Davis regarded it a "dazzling" episode in which Debnam-Carey "brilliantly delivered on an intensely heartfelt script", with a performance as strong as her work in "This Land is Your Land".

Ray Flook of Bleeding Cool praised the use of silence and sound, and considered it a "very important" episode for Alicia to move forward while crediting Debnam-Carey's portrayal for "almost single-handedly renewing [his] faith in where [the season] was going". Ian Sandwell of Digital Spy called the episode a "gripping showcase" for the actress, who makes "the sudden shifts [in sentiments] work", noting that the show "soars" when it gives focus to Alicia. Writing for Forbes, Erik Kain said the episode is "compelling from start to finish" and one of the series' best, while it reinforced his view that Alicia "should become the central protagonist of the show". David Zapanta of Den of Geek deemed "Close Your Eyes" a risk that pays off, as "haunting cinematography, a palpable sense of dread, and what is arguably a career-defining performance from Debnam-Carey combine to create a powerful, artfully directed episode."

=== Ratings ===
The episode was seen by 1.86 million viewers in the United States on its original air date, slightly below the previous episodes ratings of 1.88 million viewers.
