= Weak (Fear the Walking Dead) =

- Fear the Walking Dead episode
- Episode no.: Season 4 Episode 12
- Directed by: Colman Domingo
- Written by: Kalinda Vazquez
- Original air date: September 2, 2018
- Running time: 48 minutes

Guest appearances
- Tonya Pinkins as Martha; Aaron Stanford as Jim Brauer; Daryl Mitchell as Wendell Rabinowitz; Mo Collins as Sarah Rabinowitz

Episode chronology
← Previous "The Code"	Next → "Blackjack"
- Fear the Walking Dead (season 4)

"Weak" is the twelfth episode of the fourth season of the post-apocalyptic horror television series Fear the Walking Dead, which aired on AMC on September 2, 2018, in the United States.

This episode was directed by Colman Domingo who plays Victor Strand; his directorial debut.

== Production ==
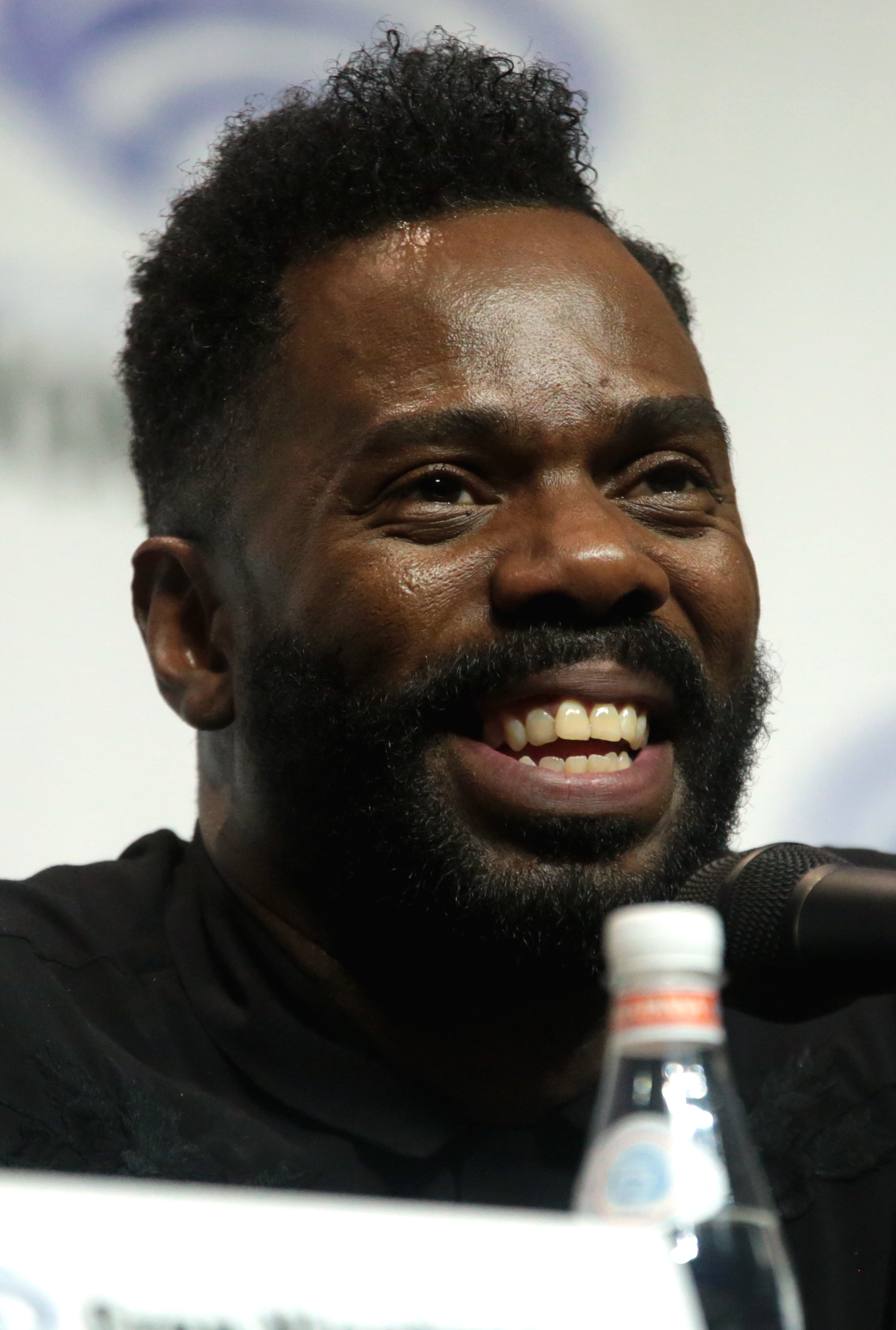
The episode was directed by main cast member Colman Domingo

On April 21, 2018, Colman Domingo revealed that he would be directing the twelfth episode of this season.

== Plot ==
Running low on fuel, June and Althea camp inside the SWAT truck over the next few days. They hear a static-filled transmission over the radio and go to higher ground for a better signal. Morgan, who is traveling with Sarah, Wendell and Jim, tries to make contact with the others by revealing his location via the walkie, but there is no response. Althea begins to feel weak due to lack of water and food. June and Althea find an abandoned truck and begin driving. They then see the SWAT truck drive past them, and they chase it. Althea comes down with a fever, and tells June there is antibiotics in her truck. June goes by herself to track down the truck, and retrieves it after an altercation with Quinn, the man who stole it. However, the truck is out of fuel. June cannot find the medicine, and Althea reveals over the radio that there wasn't any; she just wanted the truck back with her videotapes. June luckily finds medicine in an overturned bus near the truck. Morgan unknowingly encounters the mysterious woman at a supply box, and after he leaves, she replaces the bottles of clean water with dirty water. At higher ground, Morgan obtains a signal and gives his location. June and Althea hear the message and reunite with Morgan. Quinn, who in the mean time has found fuel, is attacked and killed by Purvis, the Infected companion of the mysterious woman. She leaves Purvis behind and watches Quinn reanimate.

== Reception ==
"Weak" received somewhat positive from critics. On Rotten Tomatoes, "Weak" garnered a 71% rating with an average score of 7/10 based on 7 reviews.

=== Ratings ===
The episode was seen by 1.52 million viewers in the United States on its original air date, below the previous episodes ratings of 1.83 million viewers.
