= Desi's Looking for a New Girl =

2000 film by Mary Guzmán

- Directed by: Mary Guzmán
- Screenplay by: Mary Guzmán
- Produced by: Fontana Butterfield; Mary Guzmán
- Starring: Desi del Valle; Yesenia Aguirre; Sandra Carola
- Cinematography: Sophie Constantinou
- Edited by: Lidia Szajko
- Production company: Mary Guzmán Productions
- Release date: 16 June 2000
- Running time: 68 minutes
- Country: USA
- Languages: Spanish, English

Desi's Looking for a New Girl is a 2000 American comedy-drama film written and directed by Mary Guzmán. stars Desi del Valle, Yesenia Aguirre, Marga Giomez, Sandra Carola.

== Synopsis ==
Desi (Desi del Valle) is a young Latina artist living in San Francisco, and is involved in the Latina lesbian scene there. She becomes depressed when her girlfriend leaves her. Efforts by her friends to set her up with various women fail, as each blind date is more comical than the last, and Desi finds each to be "Ms. Wrong". The story is told by one of Desi's friends, skateboarder JT (Yesenia Aguirre), who in her own storyline dreams of meeting comic Marga Gomez, her idol.

== Cast ==
- Desi del Valle as Desi
- Yesenia Aguirre as JT
- Marga Gomez as herself
- Sandra Carola
- Rosa Medina
- Michelle T. Cordero
- Richard A. Bracho
- Alisa Rodriguez
- Janelle Jacoo
- Colman Domingo as Mother

== Release ==
Desi's Looking for a New Girl premiered at the 2000 San Francisco Lesbian and Gay Film Festival.

== Reception ==
Variety critic Dennis Harvey panned the film. He wrote that while the milieu of the film – the Latina lesbian culture of San Francisco's Mission District – is potentially interesting, the film itself is "uneventful and padded even at 68 slim minutes" and that it fails "to develop any narrative or characters to draw us in." The review in the Chicago Reader was equally harsh, calling the film a "long-winded [and] technically clumsy comedy." Reviewer Ted Shen also viewed the film as a missed opportunity for a worthwhile glimpse into the Latina lesbian dating scene.

The Curves magazine review, on the other hand, calls the film "a fun and uniquely told story of life after a long-term relationship ends." Reviewer Lauren Shiro called the love and support between the characters "palpable" and "very endearing", and opined that the storytelling sweeps the viewer in, making "you feel very much like a part of the story."

The film has been cited in several books and academic papers on Latina and lesbian Latina cultural representation.

== Awards ==
- 2000 L.A. Outfest - Mary Guzmán won the Outstanding Emerging Talent award (tied with Patrik-Ian Polk for Punks (2000))

== See also ==
- List of LGBT-related films directed by women
