= Colman Domingo =

American actor and playwright (born 1969)

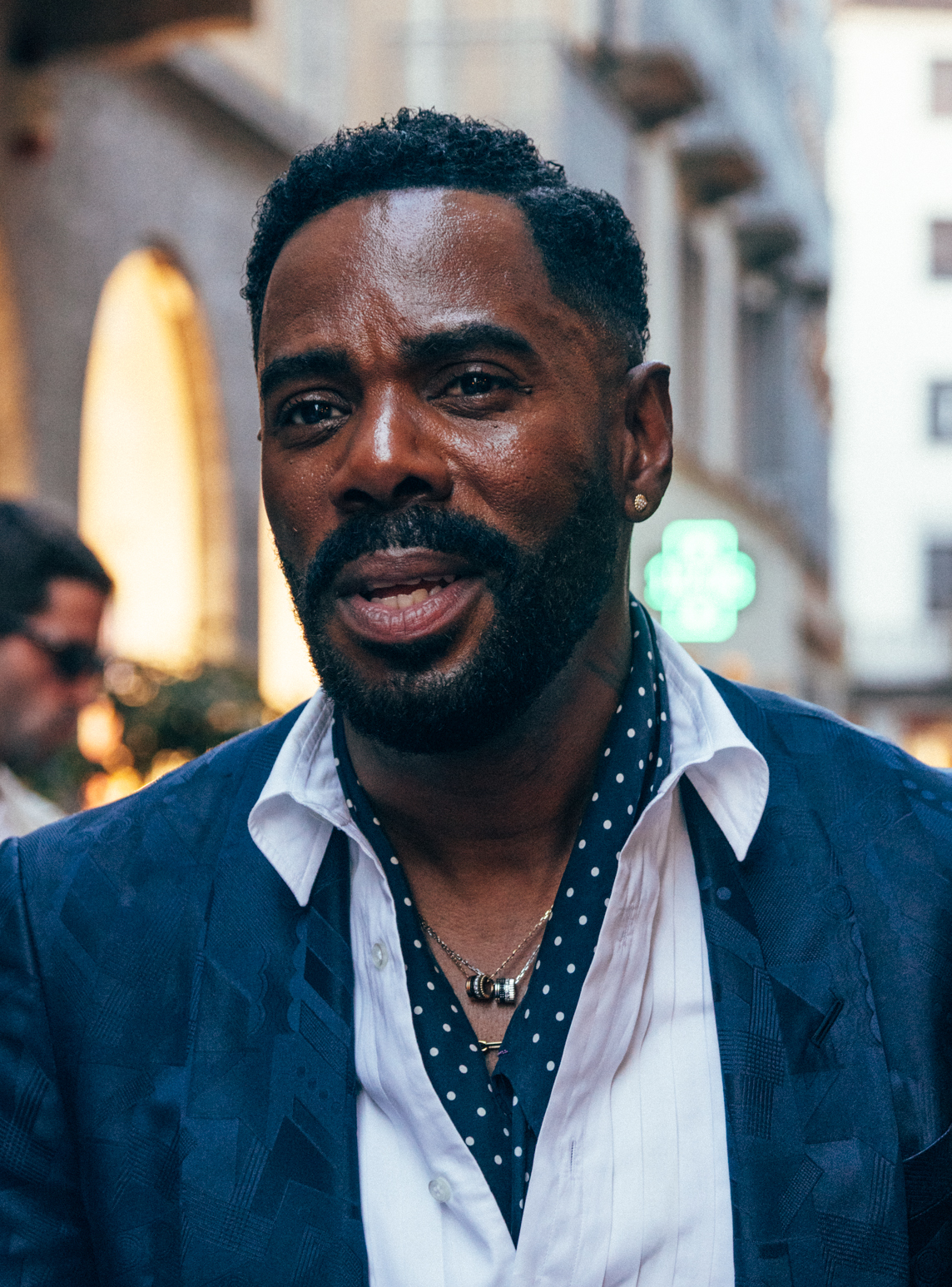
- Domingo in 2026
- Born: Colman Jason Domingo; November 28, 1969 (age 56); Philadelphia, Pennsylvania, U.S.
- Education: Temple University (BA)
- Occupations: Actor; playwright; director
- Years active: 1994–present
- Works: Full list
- Spouse: Raúl Domingo (m. 2014)
- Awards: Full list

Colman Jason Domingo (born November 28, 1969) is an American actor, playwright and director. Prominent on both screen and stage since the 2010s, Domingo has received various accolades, including a Primetime Emmy Award, and nominations for two Academy Awards and two Tony Awards. Time magazine named him among the 100 most influential people in the world in 2024.

Domingo began his career in regional theater productions before transitioning to Broadway with roles in Well (2005), Passing Strange (2008), and Chicago (2010–2011). For his role in the original Broadway and West End productions of The Scottsboro Boys, he earned nominations for the Tony Award for Best Featured Actor in a Musical in 2011 and the Laurence Olivier Award for Best Performance in a Supporting Role in a Musical in 2014. He also wrote the book for Summer: The Donna Summer Musical (2018) and co-produced Fat Ham (2023), a modern-day adaptation of William Shakespeare's Hamlet nominated for the Tony Award for Best Play.

On television, Domingo portrayed Victor Strand in the AMC series Fear the Walking Dead (2015–2023) and played the recovering drug addict Ali Muhammad on the HBO series Euphoria (2019–2026), for which he won the Primetime Emmy Award for Outstanding Guest Actor in a Drama Series in 2022. He also earned two nominations for the Primetime Emmy Award for Outstanding Supporting Actor in a Comedy Series for his role as an interior decorator in the Netflix series The Four Seasons (2025).

In film, Domingo received consecutive nominations for the Academy Award for Best Actor for his portrayals of civil rights activist Bayard Rustin in the biopic Rustin (2023) and a prison inmate in the drama Sing Sing (2024). His other film credits include Lincoln (2012), The Butler (2013), Selma (2014), If Beale Street Could Talk (2018), Ma Rainey's Black Bottom (2020), Zola (2021), The Color Purple (2023), and Michael (2026).

== Early life and education ==
Domingo was born and raised as the third of four children in Philadelphia, Pennsylvania, in a working class household. His mother, Edith Bowles, was a homemaker of African American heritage who also worked at a bank, while his stepfather, Clarence, sanded floors for a living. Domingo's biological father was from Belize, with relatives from Guatemala and Honduras. He left the family when Domingo was nine years old. Domingo had a speech impediment, a lisp, as a child and was sent to speech therapy classes by his mother.

Domingo is a 1987 Overbrook High School graduate, and later attended Temple University, where he majored in journalism. Soon thereafter, he moved to San Francisco, California, where he started acting, mainly in theater productions.

His mother died in 2006, the day after Domingo's successful audition for the theater musical Passing Strange. His stepfather had died a few months earlier.

From 2009 to 2017, Domingo lived in the federally subsidized artists' building Manhattan Plaza.

== Career ==
=== 1994–2007: Early film and television roles ===
Domingo's first on-screen acting credit was in a 1995 direct-to-video feature film called Timepiece. Domingo continued to act sporadically through the 1990s, making his television debut in the police procedural Nash Bridges in 1997. He took a small role in Clint Eastwood's True Crime (1999) and acted in the independent films Desi's Looking for a New Girl (2000), Kung Phooey (2003), and the crime drama Freedomland (2006). He also took minor roles in Law & Order, Law & Order: Criminal Intent, and Law & Order: Trial by Jury.

=== 2008–2014: Theater success and minor film work ===
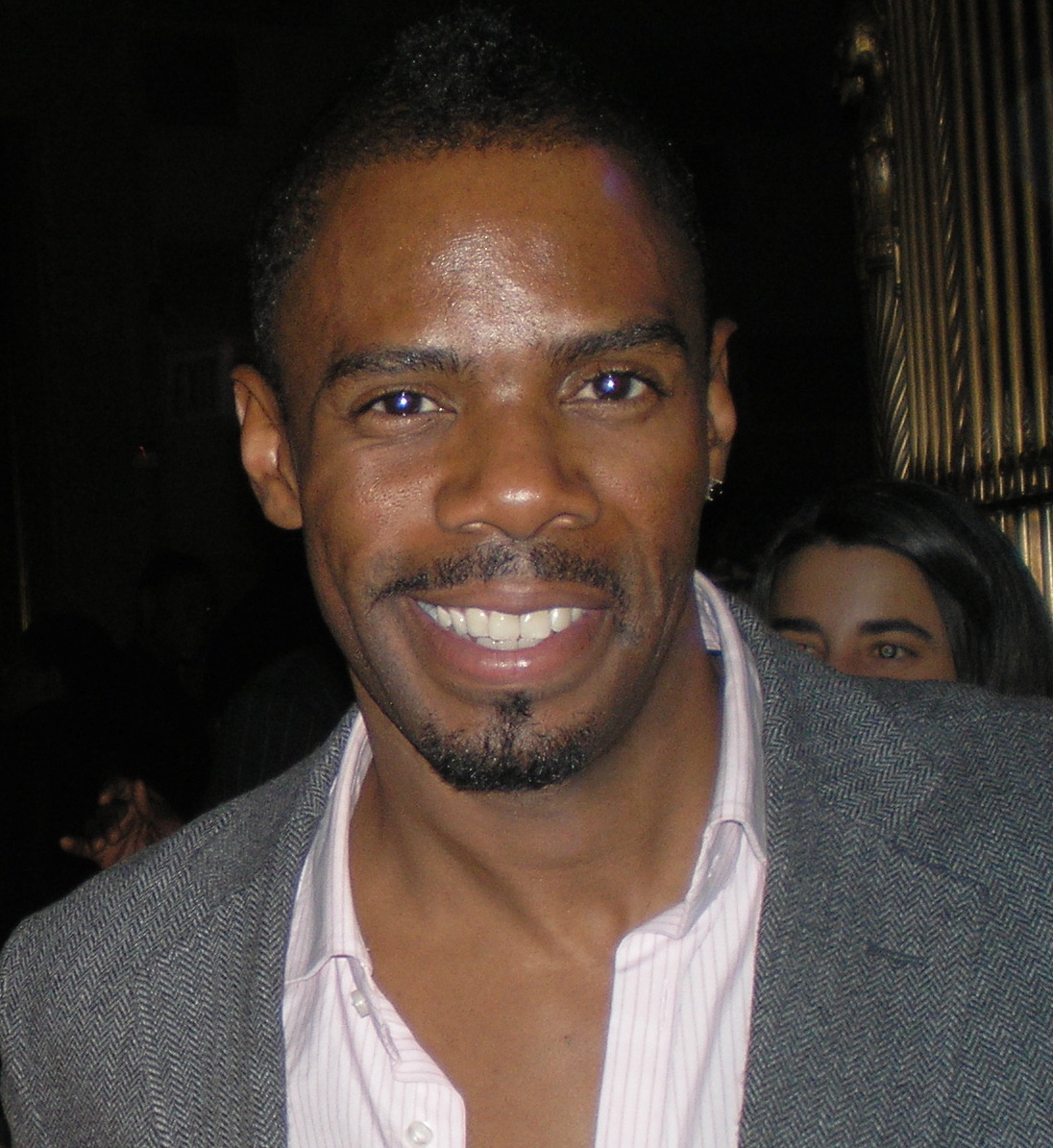
Domingo in 2006

On stage, Domingo starred as Mr. Franklin Jones, Joop, and Mr. Venus in the critically acclaimed rock musical Passing Strange, which, after a successful 2007 run at The Public Theater, opened on Broadway on February 28, 2008. He received an Obie Award in spring 2008 as part of the ensemble of Passing Strange Off-Broadway, and reprised his role in the film version of Passing Strange, directed by Spike Lee, which made its premiere at the 2009 Sundance Film Festival. Domingo went on to immediately collaborate with Lee again for a small role in the film Miracle at St. Anna (2008). He then acted in the sketch series The Big Gay Sketch Show from 2008 to 2010.

In 2010, Domingo's one-man autobiographical play A Boy and His Soul premiered Off-Broadway at the Vineyard Theatre, for which he won a Lucille Lortel Award for Outstanding Solo Show. He was also nominated for a Drama Desk Award and a Drama League Award. For his work in The Scottsboro Boys on Broadway in 2010, he was nominated for the Tony Award for Best Featured Actor in a Musical in May 2011. When The Scottsboro Boys opened in London, Domingo was nominated for the Laurence Olivier Award for Best Performance in a Supporting Role in a Musical in April 2014. He was also nominated for the Fred Astaire Award for Best Principal Dancer on Broadway in 2011. In 2012, Domingo starred in the premiere of his play Wild With Happy at The Public Theater.

Domingo collaborated with Spike Lee again for a supporting role in the film Red Hook Summer (2012). Around this time, he booked a small part as Private Harold Green in the opening scenes of Steven Spielberg's historical epic Lincoln (2012) which was critically acclaimed and a box office hit; Spielberg cast him after having previously cast him in a small part in a cancelled George Gershwin biopic. Domingo then appeared in minor supporting roles in similarly successful films 42 (2013), The Butler (2013), and Selma (2014).

From June 14 to July 18, 2014, Domingo returned to theater to play Billy Flynn in the Broadway revival of Chicago. According to The New York Times, Domingo considered "quitting the acting business over the rejection" in 2014 due to missing out on many film and television auditions, including one for a small role on Boardwalk Empire because casting directors allegedly said that his skin was too dark. Domingo described having an emotional breakdown after being rejected for a role he and others felt was perfect for him. He subsequently decided his talents weren't best used in acting, and to instead pursue a business in headshot photography. Around this time, a friend introduced him to a manager who helped Domingo change his auditioning style and put him forward for different types of roles. These changes helped Domingo to get booked for his breakout role in AMC's The Walking Dead spinoff television series, Fear the Walking Dead, which Domingo has said "gave me a new footing back in the industry, believing I had something to give".

=== 2015–2019: Television breakthrough ===
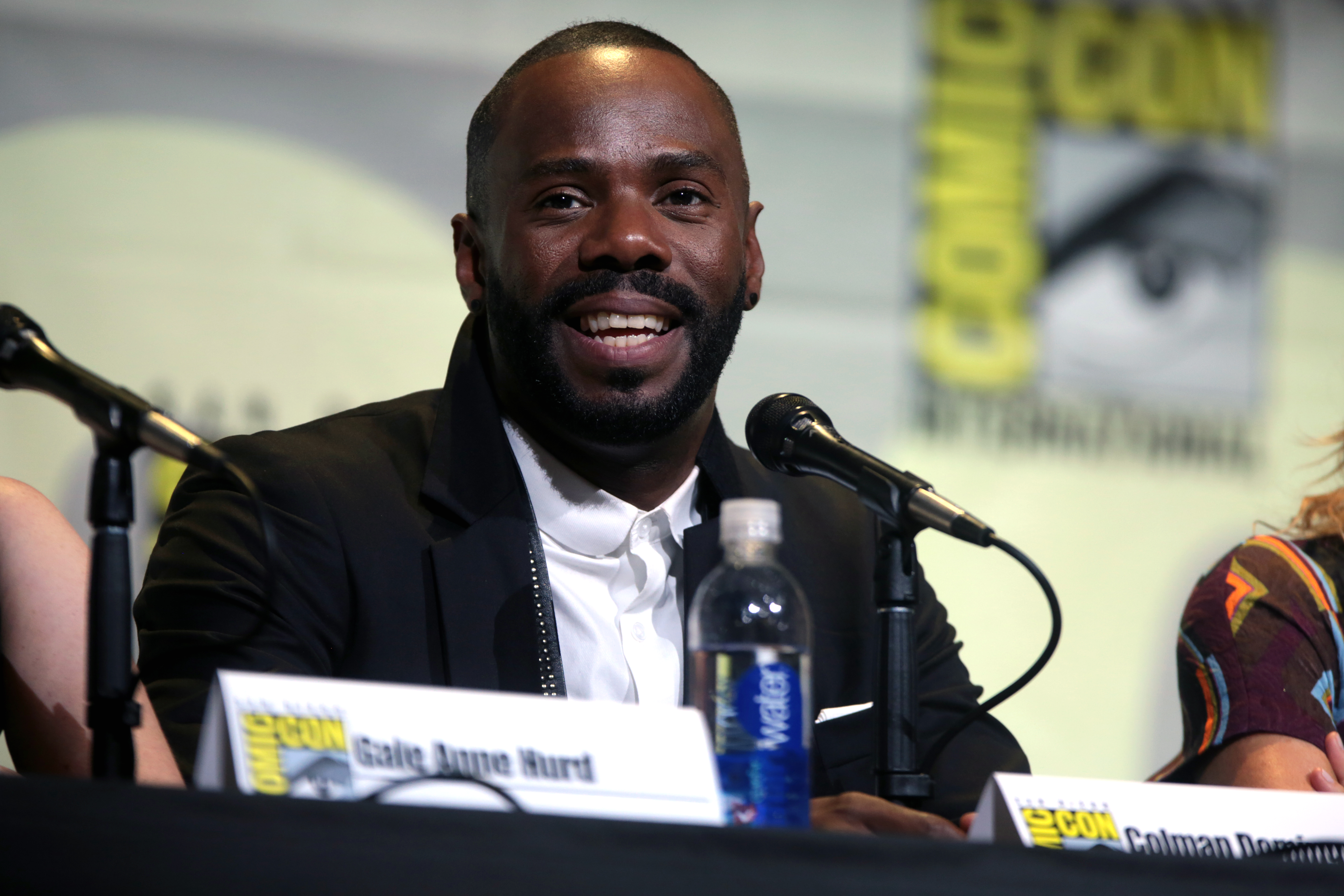
Domingo in 2016

On Fear the Walking Dead, Domingo portrayed the character of Victor Strand; his first appearance was in the fifth episode of the first season, titled "Cobalt". In December of that year, it was announced that Domingo was promoted to series regular for the second season of the series. IndieWire called him "easily the most vivid character in the sometimes gray apocalypse" of the series.

The 2015 Humana Festival of New American Plays premiered Domingo's play Dot, directed by Meredith McDonough. Dot was produced at the off-Broadway Vineyard Theatre in 2016. Lights Out: Nat "King" Cole, co-written by Domingo and Patricia McGregor, premiered at People's Light outside Philadelphia in 2017, where he directed a production of Dot in 2019.

In 2016, Domingo appeared in various television series, with roles such as Dr. Russell Daniels in The Knick, Father Frank in Lucifer, and Dr. Evers in Louis C.K.'s Horace and Pete. That year, he also starred as Hark Turner in Nate Parker's The Birth of a Nation, which was based on the story of Nat Turner, an enslaved man who led a slave rebellion in Southampton County, Virginia in 1831. Of his experience shooting The Birth of a Nation, Domingo said:

I've played a Union soldier in Lincoln, head of the White House butler staff in The Butler, and even marched with Selma, but the idea of playing a slave who was going to be a part of this rebellion... I was living in so much darkness for the first couple weeks and I had to really work it out. We were shooting on plantations, and you feel that emotional trauma. It's in the soil; it's in the air.

In 2017, Domingo joined the Academy of Motion Picture Arts and Sciences as a member of the Actors' Branch, and played a dragonfly in an episode of the fourth season of the Netflix animated series BoJack Horseman.

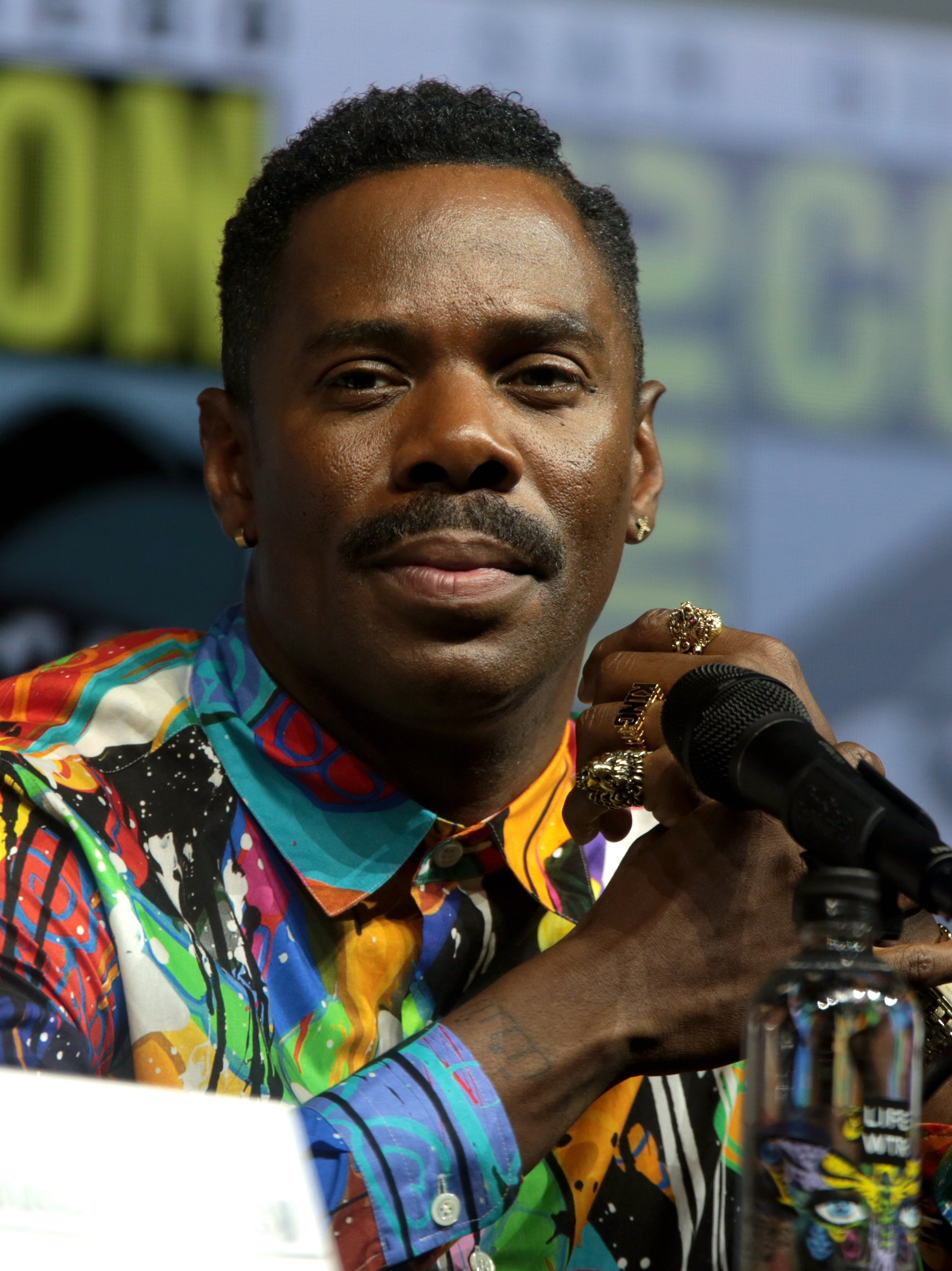
Domingo in 2018

In 2018, Domingo joined the Directors Guild of America as a director on season four of Fear the Walking Dead. He became the first ever actor from the series to helm an episode within The Walking Dead franchise. He ultimately directed three episodes of Fear the Walking Dead (episode 12 of season four, "Weak"; episode three of season five, "Humbug's Gulch"; and episode three of season six, "Alaska"). That year, he also wrote the book for the Broadway musical Summer: The Donna Summer Musical, and appeared in Barry Jenkins' If Beale Street Could Talk, a film adaptation of the James Baldwin 1974 novel of the same name. He also collaborated with Sam Levinson for the first time with a supporting role in Assassination Nation (2018).

Levinson cast Domingo in the recurring role of Ali Muhammad, a recovering drug addict, in the HBO drama series Euphoria (2019–2026). Domingo attracted considerable attention for his performance in, winning the Primetime Emmy Award for Outstanding Guest Actor in a Drama Series in 2022 for his work in the second season of the series.

=== 2020–present: Film breakthrough ===
In 2020, Domingo signed a first-look deal with AMC Networks. That year, he also received acclaim for his supporting role as Cutler in the Netflix adaptation of August Wilson's play Ma Rainey's Black Bottom, alongside Viola Davis and Chadwick Boseman. The following year, he received additional accolades for his role as X, a ruthless pimp, in the crime film Zola, which was directed by Janicza Bravo for A24. For his role as X, he received a nomination for the Independent Spirit Award for Best Supporting Male. That year, he also served as an executive producer on Scott Aharoni and Dennis Latos' short film Leylak, which premiered at that year's Tribeca Festival and qualified for the Academy Award for Best Live Action Short Film.

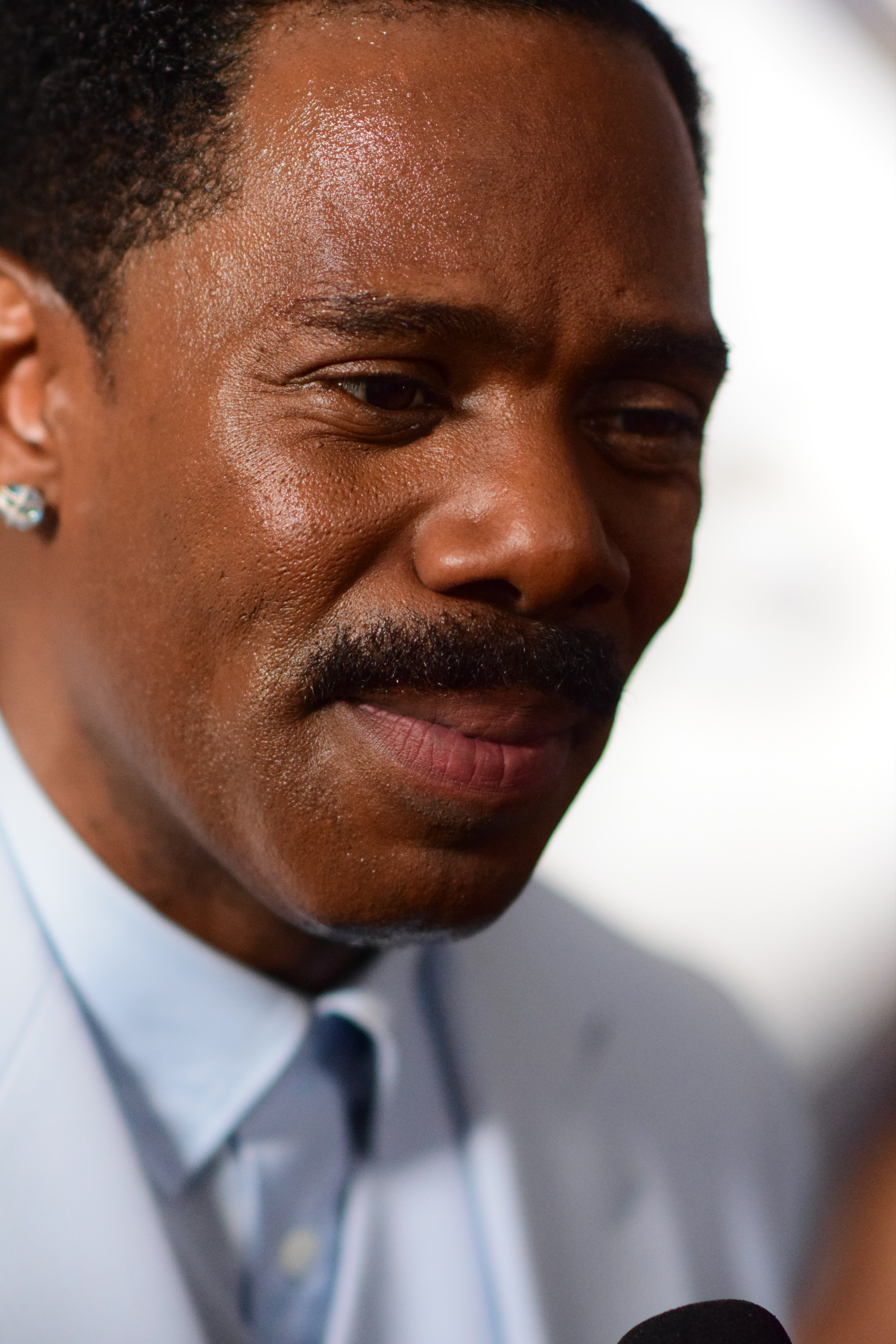
Domingo at the 75th Tony Awards in 2022

In 2023, Domingo starred as civil rights activist Bayard Rustin in the Netflix biopic Rustin, which was directed by George C. Wolfe. Upon the announcement of his being cast in the lead role, the Bayard Rustin Center for Social Justice voiced their approval directly to Domingo, espousing that "Your powerful voice helps amplify Bayard Rustin, Godfather of Intersectionality, Planned the March, Brought non-violence to the Movement, Inspired the Freedom Riders, Lost to history because of who he loved, Who he was. Angelic Troublemakers unite!"

For his performance in Rustin, Domingo received nominations for an Academy Award, BAFTA Award, Golden Globe Award, and Screen Actors Guild Award for Best Actor. His Academy Award nomination for Rustin made him the first Afro-Latino to receive an Academy Award nomination for Best Actor, as well as the second openly gay man, after Ian McKellen—and the first American openly gay man—to receive an Academy Award nomination for playing a gay character.

He received positive notice for his performance as Mister in the film adaptation of the musical The Color Purple, itself based on the novel of the same name and its 1985 film adaptation, and along with the ensemble cast, he received a nomination for the Screen Actors Guild Award for Outstanding Performance by a Cast in a Motion Picture for the film. That year, he also voiced the DC Comics superhero Batman in the Spotify scripted podcast The Riddler: Secrets in the Dark. The following year, he reprised the role in the second season of Batman Unburied, succeeding Winston Duke in the part.

Domingo portrayed John "Divine G" Whitfield in the prison drama Sing Sing, which premiered at the 2023 Toronto International Film Festival, and which was picked up by A24 for theatrical distribution the following year to critical acclaim. Domingo received nominations for the Academy Award, BAFTA Award, Golden Globe Award, and Screen Actors Guild Award for his performance in Sing Sing. In October 2024, he appeared on Eisa Davis and Lin-Manuel Miranda's musical concept album Warriors. He sang the role of Masai. In 2025, Domingo voiced Norman Osborn in the Marvel Studios animated series Your Friendly Neighborhood Spider-Man, and has expressed interest in playing the character in live-action in the Marvel Cinematic Universe.

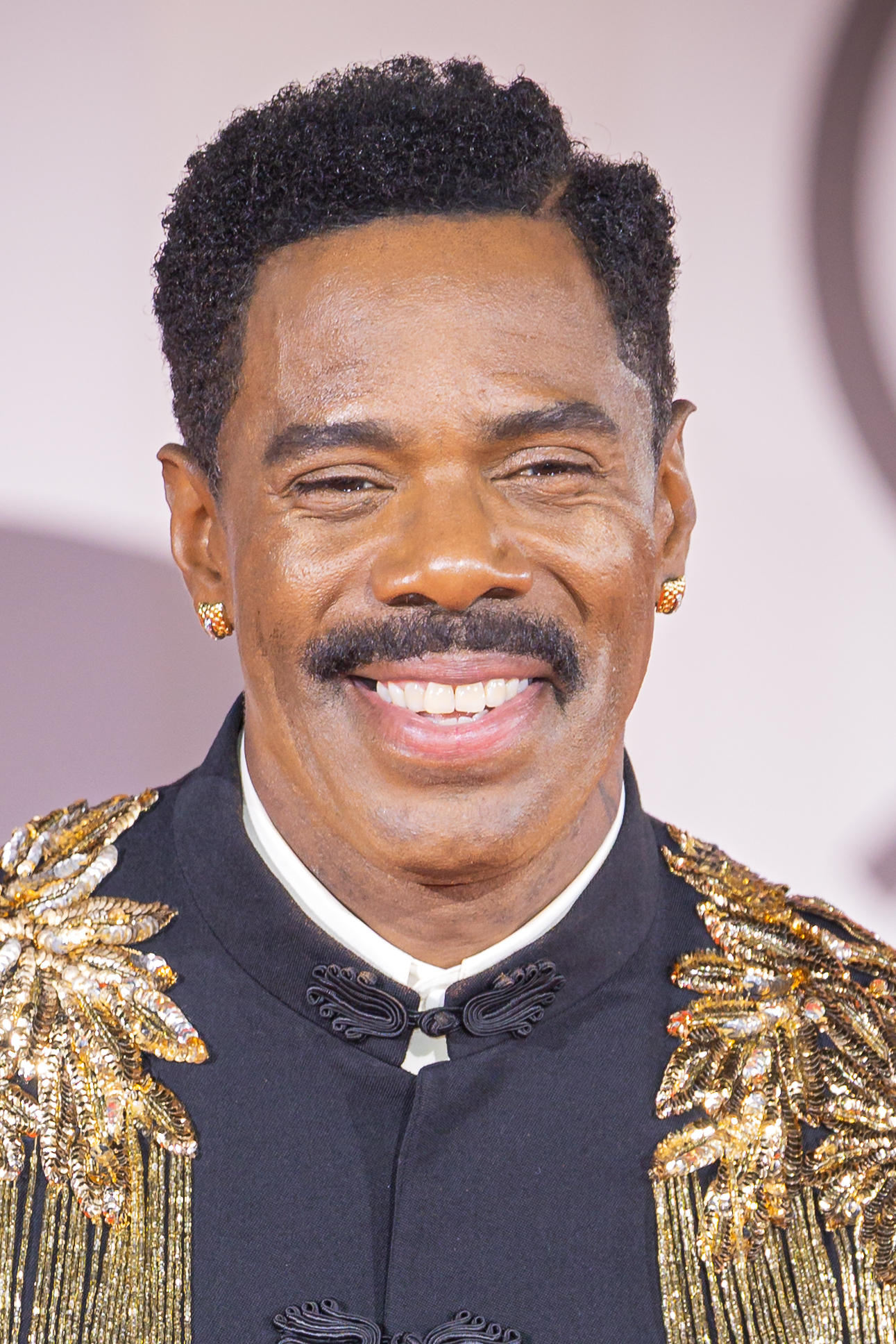
Domingo at the 82nd Venice International Film Festival in 2025

Domingo co-starred in The Four Seasons, which was released on Netflix on May 1, 2025. In May 2025, Netflix renewed it for a second season. In that same year, he was nominated for a Primetime Emmy Award for Outstanding Supporting Actor in a Comedy Series for his portrayal of Danny. Domingo was a co-chair of the 2025 Met Gala, as well as starring as real life radio host Fred Temple in Gus Van Sant's historical crime film Dead Man's Wire. In August 2025, Domingo starred in Sabrina Carpenter's music video for her song "Tears".

In 2026, Domingo portrayed Joe Jackson in the musical biopic Michael about the life of singer Michael Jackson. To portray Jackson, Domingo underwent heavy prosthetics, including colored contact lenses, and shaved his mustache to a pencil-thin line. On doing Michael, Domingo stated that he didn't allow the controversy to influence him and reasoned: "It's about the character, more than anything. And the idea of working with the (Jackson family) estate, Antoine Fuqua and Jaafar Jackson — who is exceptional". He added in a later interview, "the movie has become an examination of how Michael became Michael, before we deal with anything else. Everyone thinks there's one way to tell his story, and there isn't. One can't deny Michael's genius and his extraordinary legacy in the music industry." His performance divided critics with Monica Costillo of The A.V. Club describing Domingo as "scenery-chewing" while critic Robert Daniels of Rogerebert.com labeled it as his "worst, most caricatured performance of his career". Domingo co-starred in Steven Spielberg's Disclosure Day, alongside Emily Blunt, Josh O'Connor, Eve Hewson, Wyatt Russell, and Colin Firth. It marked Domingo's second collaboration with Spielberg. Domingo said: "I finished reading the script and I bawled. I thought it was one of the most beautiful scripts about our humanity ... and I literally cried because Steven Spielberg believes in the possibility of the human beings we could be."

==== Upcoming ====
Domingo is due to co-star opposite Kerry Washington, James Marsden and Chloe East in the Jaume Collet-Serra-helmed thriller An Innocent Girl. In the fall of 2026, Domingo will direct and star in Unforgettable, a Nat King Cole biopic he also co-wrote.

Domingo is also attached to star opposite Sandra Hüller in True-ish, and in Strange Arrivals opposite Demi Moore.

== Personal life ==
Domingo met his husband, Raúl Domingo, in 2005. They married in 2014. Domingo is gay.

Domingo taught classes and performed lectures at the University of Texas at Austin in 2014, O'Neill National Theater Institute in 2015, and University of Wisconsin-Madison in 2016. On May 10, 2025, Domingo received an honorary Doctor of Public Service from American University during the American University School of Public Affairs' Spring 2025 commencement, during which he was keynote speaker. In 2026, Domingo received an honorary doctorate from Swarthmore College in Pennsylvania and addressed the graduating class encouraging them to "go forward with rigor. Go forward with style. Go forward with conviction. And above all, go forward with love so immense that people feel more alive simply because you entered the room".

== Acting credits and accolades ==
Over his career, Domingo has received a Primetime Emmy Award as well as nominations for two Academy Awards, two BAFTA Awards, five Critics' Choice Awards, two Golden Globe Awards, a Laurence Olivier Award, four Screen Actors Guild Awards, and two Tony Awards.

== See also ==
- African-American Tony nominees and winners
- List of actors with Academy Award nominations
- List of actors with more than one Academy Award nomination in the acting categories
- List of Hispanic Academy Award winners and nominees
- List of LGBTQ Academy Award winners and nominees
- List of black Academy Award winners and nominees
- List of black Golden Globe Award winners and nominees
- List of Primetime Emmy Award winners
