= Rustin (film) =

2023 film by George C. Wolfe

- Theatrical release poster
- Directed by: George C. Wolfe
- Screenplay by: Julian Breece; Dustin Lance Black
- Story by: Julian Breece
- Produced by: Bruce Cohen; Tonia Davis; George C. Wolfe
- Starring: Colman Domingo; Chris Rock; Jeffrey Wright; Audra McDonald
- Cinematography: Tobias A. Schliessler
- Edited by: Andrew Mondshein
- Music by: Branford Marsalis
- Production companies: Higher Ground; Bold Choices
- Distributed by: Netflix
- Release dates: August 31, 2023 (Telluride); November 3, 2023 (United States)
- Running time: 106 minutes
- Country: United States
- Language: English

Rustin is a 2023 American biographical drama film directed by George C. Wolfe from a screenplay by Julian Breece and Dustin Lance Black and a story by Breece about the life of civil rights activist Bayard Rustin. Produced by Barack and Michelle Obama's production company Higher Ground, the film stars Colman Domingo in the title role, alongside Chris Rock, Glynn Turman, Aml Ameen, Gus Halper, CCH Pounder, Da'Vine Joy Randolph, Johnny Ramey, Michael Potts, Jeffrey Wright, and Audra McDonald. It is based on the true story of Rustin, who helped Martin Luther King Jr. and others organize the 1963 March on Washington.

Rustin premiered at the Telluride Film Festival on August 31, 2023, and screened at the Toronto International Film Festival on September 13. It had a limited theatrical release on November 3 before being released on Netflix on November 17. The film received generally positive reviews, with Domingo's performance garnering numerous accolades, including nominations for the Academy Award, BAFTA Award, Golden Globe Award, and SAG Award for Best Actor.

== Plot ==
In 1960, as the civil rights movement fights for racial equality across the United States, activist Bayard Rustin urges Martin Luther King Jr. to lead a protest ahead of the Democratic National Convention. New York Congressman Adam Clayton Powell Jr. and NAACP leader Roy Wilkins, critical of King's rising popularity and Rustin's influence, threaten to accuse King of a homosexual relationship with the openly gay Rustin, leading to Rustin's resignation from the Southern Christian Leadership Conference.

Three years later, Rustin remains alienated from King and much of the movement, but his commitment to nonviolent action is embraced by many younger activists, including Tom Kahn, his assistant and lover. Planning a large-scale march on Washington, D.C., Rustin enlists the help of A. Philip Randolph, the respected architect of demonstrations that led to such victories as ending racial segregation in the armed forces. Despite support from NAACP organizer Medgar Evers, Wilkins rejects Randolph's and Rustin's plan, and Rustin begins an affair with Elias Taylor, a married organizer and pastor.

Violence against demonstrators in Birmingham receives national attention and spurs Rustin to leave his work at the War Resisters League. Evers is assassinated hours after President John F. Kennedy calls for civil rights legislation. Rustin visits King—remembering being assaulted by police himself in 1942 for refusing to move to the back of a bus—and convinces him to support the march. Wilkins continues to object to Rustin's participation due to his reputation, but Randolph appoints Rustin as his deputy director, fully in charge of organizing the March on Washington.

Rustin assembles a team of volunteers and dedicated activists, including Cleve Robinson and Anna Arnold Hedgeman, at a makeshift office in Harlem. He visits the National Mall but is prevented from meeting with D.C. officials. He warns King that they have made powerful political enemies, and is forced to accept Wilkins's and others' demands that reduce the march to a single day. Rustin and his organizers continue to raise funds and public support, but his affair with Taylor strains his relationship with Kahn.

Senator Strom Thurmond publicly denounces Rustin as a communist, and Powell attempts to embarrass him into stepping down, but Rustin's remarkable efforts to organize a 100,000-person march in seven weeks speak for themselves. After Rustin receives a strongly worded call from Taylor's pregnant wife, Taylor ends their affair. Thurmond publicizes Rustin's arrest for homosexual activity in Pasadena ten years earlier, but Randolph and King come to his defense.

On August 28, 1963, the March on Washington draws over 200,000 people, who gather in front of the Lincoln Memorial. The massive demonstration culminates in King's "I Have a Dream" speech, and though Wilkins invites Rustin to join the march's leaders at the White House, he remains behind with his volunteers. An epilogue explains that the march was the nation's largest peaceful protest at that time; the Civil Rights Act was enacted nine months later; and Rustin later met his lifelong partner and was posthumously awarded the Presidential Medal of Freedom.

== Cast ==
- Colman Domingo as Bayard Rustin
- Aml Ameen as Martin Luther King Jr.
- Glynn Turman as A. Philip Randolph ("Chief")
- Chris Rock as Roy Wilkins
- Gus Halper as Tom Kahn
- Johnny Ramey as Elias Taylor
- CCH Pounder as Dr. Anna Hedgeman
- Michael Potts as Cleve Robinson
- Audra McDonald as Ella Baker
- Jeffrey Wright as Adam Clayton Powell Jr.
- Lilli Kay as Rachelle
- Jordan-Amanda Hall as Charlene
- Jakeem Powell as Norm Hill
- Ayana Workman as Eleanor Holmes
- Grantham Coleman as Blyden
- Jamilah Rosemond as Dorie Ladner
- Jules Latimer as Joyce Ladner
- Maxwell Whittington-Cooper as John Lewis
- Frank Harts as Jim Farmer
- Kevin Mambo as Whitney Young
- Carra Patterson as Coretta Scott King
- Da'Vine Joy Randolph as Mahalia Jackson
- Adrienne Warren as Claudia Taylor
- Bill Irwin as A. J. Muste
- Jamar Williams as Tyrone
- Hope Clarke as Lucille Randolph
- Rashad Demond Edwards as Medgar Evers
- Cotter Smith as Chief Wells
- Drayton Walker as Little Stevie Wonder
- Robert M. Pflegardt as Joachim Prinz
- Christopher Anglim as Eugene Carson Blake
- Devin Doolan as Walter Reuther
- Marlon Bradley Ray as Floyd McKissick
- Jordan Aaron Hall as teen boy singing

== Production ==
In February 2021, it was reported that George C. Wolfe would direct a film based on the life of Bayard Rustin from a script by Julian Breece and Dustin Lance Black. In October 2021, Colman Domingo was cast as Rustin. Chris Rock, Glynn Turman, and Audra McDonald also joined the cast. Later that month, Aml Ameen, CCH Pounder, Michael Potts, Bill Irwin, Da'Vine Joy Randolph, Gus Halper, Johnny Ramey, Carra Patterson, and Adrienne Warren joined the cast. Production began in November 2021 in Pittsburgh. In December 2021, Jeffrey Wright, Grantham Coleman, Lilli Kay, Jordan-Amanda Hall, Jakeem Dante Powell, Ayana Workman, Jamilah Nadege Rosemond, Jules Latimer, Maxwell Whittington-Cooper, Frank Harts, and Kevin Mambo joined the cast. Principal photography ended in Washington, D.C. in August 2022.

Lenny Kravitz wrote and performed an original song, "Road to Freedom", for the film. Wolfe said: "The one note I gave him was the song needed to help deliver us as an audience, from feeling to action. And trombones. I begged for trombones." Wolfe became fascinated by trombones after filming Ma Rainey's Black Bottom (2020), and Trombone Shorty was brought on board to contribute to the song.

== Release ==
Rustin premiered at the Telluride Film Festival on August 31, 2023. It then screened at the Toronto International Film Festival on September 13. Michelle and Barack Obama introduced the film at the opening night of the HBCU First Look Film Festival at the National Museum of African American History and Culture. The film was released in select theaters on November 3 and premiered worldwide on Netflix on November 17.

== Reception ==
=== Critical response ===
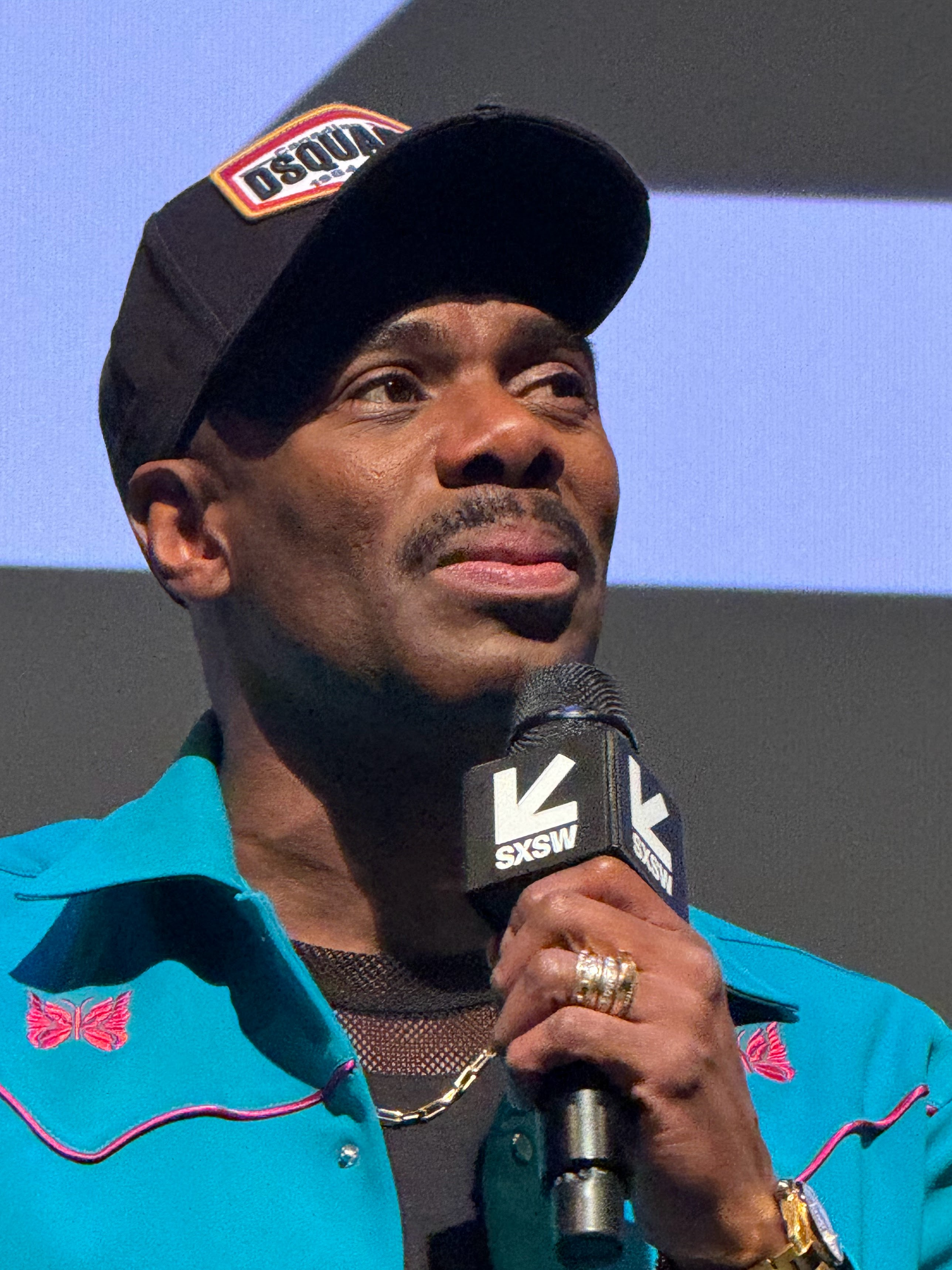
Colman Domingo garnered critical acclaim for his performance and earned an Academy Award nomination for Best Actor.

On the review aggregator website Rotten Tomatoes, 83% of 169 critics' reviews are positive, with an average rating of 7/10. The website's consensus reads: "Colman Domingo is sensational in Rustin, a stirring biopic that shines an overdue light on a remarkable legacy of public service." Metacritic, which uses a weighted average, assigned the film a score of 68 out of 100, based on 39 critics, indicating "generally favorable" reviews.

Domingo garnered much critical acclaim for his performance in the title role. John Anderson of The Wall Street Journal called Domingo a "force of nature in this film, delivering a complex, highly sympathetic portrayal" that "determines what the movie actually is, while preventing it from going awry". In her review for Entertainment Weekly, Maureen Lee Lenker wrote, "Domingo infuses Rustin with a warmth and vibrancy that creates a performance of immense empathy" and "his portrait of a man fighting for both his race and his sexuality feels incredibly personal and helps hammer home Rustin's commitment to true 'justice for all.'" The Guardian's Benjamin Lee appreciated the film's intersectional coverage of Rustin's struggles and wrote that Domingo "nails the charming persuasiveness that would explain how Rustin achieved so much in such a short amount of time and as he slowly starts to experience a level of acceptance for his whole self, rather than handpicked parts, there’s a genuine poignancy to watching him crumble in front of us, a weight we can feel being lifted away.

Other critics were more lukewarm, especially about the screenplay and direction. Bilge Ebiri of Vulture wrote that the script was laden with "ham-handed stage-setting with lines" of "classroom-exercise level writing", leading to a film "filled with all the clichés of the genre". He also said the film's "predictable plot points" and the "pro forma" nature of Rustin's "personal affairs" in conjunction with Wolfe's "methodical direction" led to "visual inertia". RogerEbert.com's Robert Daniels agreed that the film suppressed Domingo's potential, writing that he "ultimately clings to these emotional crescendos, gripping for dear life to a film that rarely, if ever, rises to his level". Michael O'Sullivan of The Washington Post found the film's "perfunctory plot" to be "as montage-y and as superficial as the film’s opening reenactments" and criticized the lack of character development across the supporting cast, writing, "none of them stands out as a three-dimensional character".

The film's approach to Rustin's sexuality was also criticized. Dustin Guastela of Jacobin wrote that the film caricatured Rustin's political views: "Rustin claims the civil rights hero has been forgotten because of his sexuality. But it was his fiery and provocative class politics that makes him both controversial and prophetic today." He added that the film's failure to develop the relationship between Rustin and Tom Kahn "weaponized" Rustin's sexuality as a means to obscure that Rustin's "historical neglect" was also due in part to his political views, which were "no less a reason for his official erasure from canonical civil rights history." In his review for IndieWire, David Ehrlich also lamented the film's handling of Rustin's sexuality, writing, "Rustin is diminished by the forced momentum of its plotting, by how inelegantly the script incorporates the social dynamics of Rustin’s homosexuality (the love triangle that develops between Rustin, fellow activist Tom Kahn, and a composite character played by Johnny Ramey stops the movie dead in its tracks every time it comes up)."

=== Accolades ===
Award	Date of ceremony	Category	Recipient(s)	Result	Ref.
The Queerties	February 28, 2023	Next Big Thing	Rustin	Nominated	
Hamptons International Film Festival	October 12, 2023	The Sherzum Award	Rustin	Won	
Heartland International Film Festival	October 15, 2023	Audience Choice Award – Narrative Special Presentation	Rustin	Won	
Mill Valley Film Festival	October 16, 2023	Directing	George C. Wolfe	Won	
Mill Valley Film Festival	October 16, 2023	Audience Award – U.S. Cinema	Rustin	Won	
Chicago International Film Festival	October 22, 2023	Gold Q-Hugo	Rustin	Nominated	
Philadelphia Film Festival	October 29, 2023	Audience Award – Narrative Feature	Rustin	Won	
Hollywood Music in Media Awards	November 15, 2023	Original Score — Feature Film	Branford Marsalis	Nominated	
Hollywood Music in Media Awards	November 15, 2023	Original Song — Feature Film	Lenny Kravitz ("Road to Freedom")	Nominated	
Gotham Independent Film Awards	November 27, 2023	Icon & Creator Tribute for Social Justice	Rustin	Won	
Celebration of Cinema & Television	December 4, 2023	Actor Award (Film)	Colman Domingo	Won	
Washington D.C. Area Film Critics Association Awards	December 10, 2023	Best Actor	Colman Domingo	Nominated	
Las Vegas Film Critics Society	December 13, 2023	Best Actor	Colman Domingo	Nominated	
Las Vegas Film Critics Society	December 13, 2023	Best Song	"Road to Freedom"	Nominated	
Indiana Film Journalists Association	December 17, 2023	Best Lead Performance	Colman Domingo	Nominated	
Women Film Critics Circle Awards	December 18, 2023	Best Actor	Colman Domingo	Nominated	
Dallas–Fort Worth Film Critics Association	December 18, 2023	Best Actor	Colman Domingo	5th place (Note: Tied with Leonardo DiCaprio for Killers of the Flower Moon.)	
San Diego Film Critics Society	December 19, 2023	Best Actor	Colman Domingo	Nominated	
Capri Hollywood International Film Festival	January 2, 2024	Best Actor	Colman Domingo	Won	
Palm Springs International Film Festival	January 4, 2024	Spotlight Award - Actor	Colman Domingo	Won	
Georgia Film Critics Association Awards	January 5, 2024	Best Actor	Colman Domingo	Nominated	
Astra Film and Creative Arts Awards	January 6, 2024	Best Actor	Colman Domingo	Nominated	
Golden Globe Awards	January 7, 2024	Best Actor – Motion Picture Drama	Colman Domingo	Nominated	
Golden Globe Awards	January 7, 2024	Best Original Song	Lenny Kravitz ("Road to Freedom")	Nominated	
Denver Film Critics Society	January 12, 2024	Best Original Song	Lenny Kravitz ("Road to Freedom")	Nominated	
Critics' Choice Movie Awards	January 14, 2024	Best Actor	Colman Domingo	Nominated	
Critics' Choice Movie Awards	January 14, 2024	Best Song	Lenny Kravitz ("Road to Freedom")	Nominated	
African-American Film Critics Association Awards	January 15, 2024	Best Actor	Colman Domingo	Won	
Black Reel Awards	January 16, 2024	Outstanding Film	Bruce Cohen, Tonia Davis & George C. Wolfe	Nominated	
Black Reel Awards	January 16, 2024	Outstanding Lead Performance	Colman Domingo	Nominated	
Black Reel Awards	January 16, 2024	Outstanding Screenplay	Julian Breece & Dustin Lance Black	Nominated	
Black Reel Awards	January 16, 2024	Outstanding Ensemble	Cherelle Cargill & Avy Kaufman	Nominated	
Black Reel Awards	January 16, 2024	Outstanding Score	Brandford Marsalias	Nominated	
Black Reel Awards	January 16, 2024	Outstanding Soundtrack	Rustin	Nominated	
Black Reel Awards	January 16, 2024	Outstanding Original Song	Lenny Kravitz ("Road to Freedom")	Nominated	
Black Reel Awards	January 16, 2024	Outstanding Costume Design	Toni-Leslie James	Nominated	
Black Reel Awards	January 16, 2024	Outstanding Production Design	Mark Ricker	Nominated	
Black Reel Awards	January 16, 2024	Outstanding Hairstyle and Make-up	Melissa Forney & Beverly Jo Pryor	Nominated	
AARP Movies for Grownups Awards	January 17, 2024	Best Actor	Colman Domingo	Won	
AARP Movies for Grownups Awards	January 17, 2024	Best Ensemble	The cast of Rustin	Nominated	
AARP Movies for Grownups Awards	January 17, 2024	Best Time Capsule	Rustin	Nominated	
Iowa Film Critics Association	January 17, 2024	Best Original Song	Lenny Kravitz ("Road to Freedom")	Runner-up	
Society of Composers & Lyricists	February 13, 2024	Outstanding Original Song for a Dramatic or Documentary Visual Media Production	Lenny Kravitz ("Road to Freedom")	Nominated	
BAFTA Film Awards	February 18, 2024	Best Actor in a Leading Role	Colman Domingo	Nominated	
Satellite Awards	February 18, 2024	Best Actor in a Motion Picture, Drama	Colman Domingo	Nominated	
Satellite Awards	February 18, 2024	Best Original Song	Lenny Kravitz ("Road to Freedom")	Nominated	
Screen Actors Guild Awards	February 24, 2024	Outstanding Performance by a Male Actor in a Leading Role	Colman Domingo	Nominated	
Artios Awards	March 7, 2024	Outstanding Achievement in Casting – Feature Studio or Independent (Drama)	Avy Kaufman, Donna Belajac, Missy Finnell, Scotty Anderson	Nominated	
Academy Awards	March 10, 2024	Best Actor in a Leading Role	Colman Domingo	Nominated	
GLAAD Media Awards	March 11 - May 14, 2024	Outstanding Film – Streaming or TV	Rustin	Won	
NAACP Image Awards	March 16, 2024	Outstanding Motion Picture	Rustin	Nominated	
NAACP Image Awards	March 16, 2024	Outstanding Directing in a Motion Picture	George C. Wolfe	Nominated	
NAACP Image Awards	March 16, 2024	Outstanding Actor in a Motion Picture	Colman Domingo	Won	
NAACP Image Awards	March 16, 2024	Outstanding Supporting Actor in a Motion Picture	Glynn Turman	Nominated	
NAACP Image Awards	March 16, 2024	Outstanding Ensemble Cast in a Motion Picture	Rustin	Nominated	
NAACP Image Awards	March 16, 2024	Outstanding Costume Design	Toni–Leslie James, Josh Quinn	Nominated	
NAACP Image Awards	March 16, 2024	Outstanding Make-up	Beverly Jo Pryor, Eric Pagdin, Quintessence Patterson	Nominated	
NAACP Image Awards	March 16, 2024	Outstanding Original Score for TV/Film	Branford Marsalis	Nominated	
World Soundtrack Awards	October 17, 2024	Best Original Song	Lenny Kravitz ("Road to Freedom")	Nominated	

== See also ==
- Civil rights movement in popular culture
