= List of Under the Dome episodes =

Under the Dome is an American science fiction mystery drama television series developed by Brian K. Vaughan and based on the novel of the same name by Stephen King. Under the Dome premiered on CBS on June 24, 2013, and concluded on September 10, 2015. 39 episodes were produced over the show's three-season run.

The series tells the story of the residents of the fictional small town called Chester's Mill, when a massive, transparent, indestructible dome suddenly cuts them off from the rest of the world. Military forces, the government, and the media positioned outside the barrier attempt to break it down, while the residents trapped inside must find their own ways to survive with diminishing resources and rising tensions. A small group of people inside the dome must also unravel complicated mysteries in order to figure out what the dome is, where it came from, and when (and if) it will go away.

== Series overview ==
Season	Episodes	Originally released		Average viewers (in millions)
Season	Episodes	First released	Last released	Average viewers (in millions)
1	13	June 24, 2013	September 16, 2013	11.21
2	13	June 30, 2014	September 22, 2014	7.17
3	13	June 25, 2015	September 10, 2015	4.70

== Episodes ==
=== Season 1 (2013) ===
No. overall	No. in season	Title	Directed by	Written by	Original release date	US viewers (millions)
1	1	"Pilot"	Niels Arden Oplev	Brian K. Vaughan	June 24, 2013	13.53
2	2	"The Fire"	Jack Bender	Rick Cleveland	July 1, 2013	11.81
3	3	"Manhunt"	Paul Edwards	Adam Stein	July 8, 2013	10.71
4	4	"Outbreak"	Kari Skogland	Peter Calloway	July 15, 2013	11.13
5	5	"Blue on Blue"	Jack Bender	Brian K. Vaughan	July 22, 2013	11.60
6	6	"The Endless Thirst"	Kari Skogland	Soo Hugh	July 29, 2013	11.41
7	7	"Imperfect Circles"	Miguel Sapochnik	Caitlin Parrish	August 5, 2013	10.42
8	8	"Thicker Than Water"	Jack Bender	Adam Stein	August 12, 2013	10.36
9	9	"The Fourth Hand"	Roxann Dawson	Daniel Truly	August 19, 2013	10.64
10	10	"Let the Games Begin"	Sergio Mimica-Gezzan	Andres Fischer-Centeno & Peter Calloway	August 26, 2013	11.11
11	11	"Speak of the Devil"	David Barrett	Scott Gold	September 2, 2013	11.15
12	12	"Exigent Circumstances"	Peter Leto	Adam Stein & Caitlin Parrish	September 9, 2013	9.72
13	13	"Curtains"	Jack Bender	Brian K. Vaughan & Scott Gold	September 16, 2013	12.10

=== Season 2 (2014) ===
No. overall	No. in season	Title	Directed by	Written by	Original release date	US viewers (millions)
14	1	"Heads Will Roll"	Jack Bender	Stephen King	June 30, 2014	9.41
15	2	"Infestation"	Ernest Dickerson	Kelly Souders & Brian Peterson	July 7, 2014	7.70
16	3	"Force Majeure"	Peter Leto	Adam Stein	July 14, 2014	7.64
17	4	"Revelation"	Holly Dale	Alexandra McNally	July 21, 2014	6.74
18	5	"Reconciliation"	Ed Ornelas	Cathryn Humphris	July 28, 2014	6.57
19	6	"In the Dark"	Jack Bender	Caitlin Parrish	August 4, 2014	6.83
20	7	"Going Home"	David Barrett	Peter Calloway	August 11, 2014	6.90
21	8	"Awakening"	Jack Bender	Andres Fischer-Centeno & Daniel Truly	August 18, 2014	7.30
22	9	"The Red Door"	Peter Weller	Kelly Souders & Brian Peterson & Adam Stein	August 25, 2014	6.60
23	10	"The Fall"	Eriq La Salle	Alexandra McNally & Mark Linehan Bruner	September 1, 2014	6.29
24	11	"Black Ice"	Jack Bender	Adam Stein & Peter Calloway	September 8, 2014	6.62
25	12	"Turn"	Peter Leto	William Kendall & Daniel Truly	September 15, 2014	7.04
26	13	"Go Now"	Jack Bender	Caitlin Parrish & Cathryn Humphris	September 22, 2014	7.52

=== Season 3 (2015) ===
No. overall	No. in season	Title	Directed by	Written by	Original release date	US viewers (millions)
27	1	"Move On"	Peter Leto	Adam Stein	June 25, 2015	6.25
28	2	"But I'm Not"	Peter Weller	Tim Schlattmann	June 25, 2015	6.25
29	3	"Redux"	Olatunde Osunsanmi	Alexandra McNally	July 2, 2015	5.28
30	4	"The Kinship"	Ed Ornelas	Cathryn Humphris	July 9, 2015	5.12
31	5	"Alaska"	David M. Barrett	Bronwyn Garrity	July 16, 2015	4.75
32	6	"Caged"	Sergio Mimica-Gezzan	Andres Fischer-Centeno	July 23, 2015	4.63
33	7	"Ejecta"	David M. Barrett	Peter Calloway	July 30, 2015	4.68
34	8	"Breaking Point"	Sam Hill	James C. Oliver & Sharla Oliver	August 6, 2015	3.88
35	9	"Plan B"	Eriq La Salle	Tim Schlattmann & Mark Linehan Bruner	August 13, 2015	3.73
36	10	"Legacy"	Dennie Gordon	Alexandra McNally & Andres Fischer-Centeno	August 20, 2015	4.04
37	11	"Love is a Battlefield"	Lee Rose	Peter Calloway & Adam Stein	August 27, 2015	4.60
38	12	"Incandescence"	PJ Pesce	Bronwyn Garrity & Cathryn Humphris	September 3, 2015	3.70
39	13	"The Enemy Within"	Peter Leto	Neal Baer & Tim Schlattmann	September 10, 2015	4.23

== Ratings ==
Under the Dome : U.S. viewers per episode (millions)

Season	Episode number													Average
Season	1	2	3	4	5	6	7	8	9	10	11	12	13	Average
1	13.53	11.81	10.71	11.13	11.60	11.41	10.42	10.36	10.64	11.11	11.15	9.72	12.10	11.21
2	9.41	7.70	7.64	6.74	6.57	6.83	6.90	7.30	6.60	6.29	6.62	7.04	7.52	7.17
3	6.25	6.25	5.28	5.12	4.75	4.63	4.68	3.88	3.73	4.04	4.60	3.70	4.23	4.70

Audience measurement performed by Nielsen Media Research
