= Imperfect Circles =

- Under the Dome episode
- Episode no.: Season 1 Episode 7
- Directed by: Miguel Sapochnik
- Written by: Caitlin Parrish
- Original air date: August 5, 2013

Guest appearances
- Jeff Chase as Boomer; Jaret Sears as Clint Dundee; Linds Edwards as Waylon Dundee; Adam Poole as Greg; Megan Ketch as Harriet

Episode chronology
← Previous "The Endless Thirst"	Next → "Thicker Than Water"
- Under the Dome (season 1)

"Imperfect Circles" is the seventh episode of the first season of the CBS drama Under the Dome. The episode aired on August 5, 2013.

The episode was well received by most critics, with some noting the series's progression, and the revelation of the mini-egg. Upon airing, the episode was watched by 10.42 million viewers and received an 18–49 rating of 2.6; the ratings drop from the previous episode may have been due to Time Warner Cable temporarily stopping the broadcast of CBS to subscribers over a financial dispute.

== Plot ==
Julia's (Rachelle Lefevre) friend, Harriet (played by Megan Ketch), touches the dome and goes into labor, so she takes her to the hospital. On their way, they are carjacked by the two Dundee brothers that killed Rose (Beth Broderick), but Barbie (Mike Vogel) arrives and the two flee. Barbie then takes the woman in labor to Alice (Samantha Mathis) to help them. While that's happening, Junior (Alexander Koch) and Big Jim (Dean Norris) argue about Junior disturbing Angie (Britt Robertson) and Jim forces Junior out of his house. Angie then decides to go see Rose and runs into Joe's (Colin Ford) friend Ben (John Elvis) and both fix the diner.

Junior goes to the police station and comes with Linda (Natalie Martinez) to find the two murderers. Junior realizes that they are at an abandoned house and gets told by Linda that one of them almost raped Angie. Linda kills one of the brothers during a fight. Junior kills the other for the attempted rape when he tries to surrender after attempting escape.

Elsewhere, Ollie (Leon Rippy) threatens Big Jim. Big Jim then checks on the city's stock piled propane but is stopped by an armed thug. At night, while the thug tries to take a truck full of propane, Jim shoots it and it explodes, killing the thug.

Joe and Norrie (Mackenzie Lintz) try to find the center of the dome thus finding a second mini-dome that holds a mysterious egg in it. After touching it, Norrie and Joe see her mother Alice and Norrie runs off to find her. Back at Joe's house the baby is born and named Alice out of gratitude for her help. The original Alice then has a heart-attack (due to insuffient insulin, which was hard to get since the dome cut off resources) and dies in Norrie's arms. Joe and Angie reunite, but in the mini-dome, the egg's shell begins to glow.

== Production ==
Executive producer Neal Baer said with TV Guide regarding questions of the "mini-dome," specifically about its powers that "[the] question is completely addressed in the last episode of the season. It's so much a part of the next six episodes. We will be speaking to what the dome can and can't do, why it's doing it and for what reasons. The visions are really going to be profound."

== Reception ==
=== Ratings ===
Ratings for the episode were expected to go down as Time Warner Cable had stopped broadcasting the CBS network over a financial dispute, which had blocked an estimated 3 million subscribers from the network. The episode was watched by 10.42 million American viewers, and received an 18–49 rating/share of 2.6/7, down considerably from the previous episode. The show tied for first for the night alongside the ninth season finale of The Bachelorette.

=== Critical reception ===
The episode was received moderately by most critics. Ashley Knierim of The Huffington Post said regarding the show's course that "things are getting really, really weird."

Ted Kindig of BuddyTV commented positively on Big Jim's role in the episode, saying "Dean Norris' snarling councilman has a pretty good night overall: while the rest of the episode gets tangled up in its weaker, soapier elements, Big Jim emerges as a pretty credible anti-hero." Zach Dionne of Vulture gave the episode a 5 out of 5 rating, saying "This episode isn’t exempt from the things that make Under the Dome problematic, but it’s the strongest, most captivating hour since the pilot. Eschewing the trusty Dilemma of the Week format, “Imperfect Circles” capably carries several stories at once. The characters are still primarily plot-delivery systems, but they’re starting to feel more like actual people we might become interested in spending time with. And now we know the show is capable of treating death poignantly rather than just mercilessly."

Andrea Reiher of Zap2it commented on the series' gradual progression, specifically on the meaning of the dome, saying ""Imperfect Circles" seems to have introduced the idea that the dome is perhaps a giant protective bubble for an egg of some sort. It's almost an incubator inside of an incubator. At this point, it's anybody's guess where exactly the egg came from and what exactly it is, but we're thinking aliens. Anybody else? Either way, this episode marks the halfway point of the season. And it continued last week's theme of the dome as sentient being, as it made important loved ones appear to people who touched the dome—first for pregnant Harriet and then for Norrie when her mother's health goes sharply downhill."

Darren Franich of Entertainment Weekly compared the episode to the first season episode of Lost "All the Best Cowboys Have Daddy Issues," saying "this episode ties in nicely with the episode in the geographic center of Lost‘s first season, wherein Locke and Boone took a stroll in the woods and discovered the Hatch. Last night, two Dome characters took a similar stroll in the woods…and found another mysterious thing that seems guaranteed to dominate the back half of this season."

Tim Surette of TV.com gave the ending of the episode a mixed review, saying the ending montage was "cheesy and nothing extraordinary, but dammit, it's the closest thing this show has ever had to a soul and I'd just like to point that out. And in the final shot, the Purple Egg of Mystery inside the Mini-Dome began to light up. This is what Under the Dome should be like all the time! I mean, I get a kick out of the terrible cornball stick-Angie-in-a-bunker-for-four-episodes Under the Dome, but if this show wants to be taken seriously and be somebody, then it's going to need more of this." Adam Newland of TV Equals gave the episode a negative review, saying "One week after the show put together some competent drama, Under the Dome was back to business as usual. While last week’s episode ended in the one the more mind-numbing contrivances dome-based TV history, at least the episode told a worthwhile story with real stakes. Quickly realizing their mistake, the show decided to vault in as far in the opposite direction as possible with tonight’s episode. What resulted was a mostly pointless hour of television that made me long for the good old days with Duke’s house fire."
