= Under the Dome season 1 =

Under the Dome
- Season 1
- Region 1 DVD cover
- No. of episodes: 13

Release
- Original network: CBS
- Original release: June 24 – September 16, 2013

Season chronology
- Next → Season 2

The first season of Under the Dome, an American science fiction mystery drama television series, premiered on CBS on June 24, 2013, and ended on September 16, 2013.

Based on the novel of the same name written by Stephen King, Under the Dome tells the story of the residents of the fictional small town of Chester's Mill, when a massive, transparent, indestructible dome suddenly cuts them off from the rest of the world. Military forces and the government positioned outside the barrier attempt to break it down, while the residents trapped inside must find their own ways to survive with diminishing resources and rising tensions. A small group of people inside the dome must also unravel complicated mysteries in order to figure out what the dome is, where it came from, and when (and if) it will go away.

The first season has a score of 68/100, based on 45 reviews, indicating "generally favorable" reviews, on review aggregator website Metacritic. The season has a score of 83/100, based on 52 reviews, on film and TV review aggregator Rotten Tomatoes; the site's critical consensus for the season reads: "Under the Dome is an effective and engrossing horror/mystery with airtight plotting and great special effects."

The first season of Under the Dome aired in the United States on Mondays at 10:00 pm ET, where it received an average of 2.7/8 in the 18–49 demographic and 11.21 million viewers over its 13-episode run.

== Season plot ==
In the first season of Under the Dome, the residents of Chester's Mill must deal with the immediate aftermath when a massive, indestructible dome suddenly crashes down on the town, cutting them off from the rest of the world. Lives are lost, questions and uncertainty loom over the trapped townspeople, and, as they realize they might be stuck for a while, panic and chaos become the new normal. As the townspeople frantically try to find resources to stay alive, an opportunistic town councilman with malicious intent makes himself the de facto dictator over the town, while an unknown stranger causes secrets about the town to be revealed. As the season progresses, the characters start to learn more about the dome, including finding a mysterious egg that supposedly serves as the Dome's power source, and although every little piece of answer gives more insight into what's happening and why, every answer also causes many more questions.

== Cast and characters ==
The cast members portray characters that were mostly taken from the original novel, "although some have been combined and others have changed jobs."

=== Main ===
- Mike Vogel as Dale 'Barbie' Barbara
- Rachelle Lefevre as Julia Shumway
- Natalie Martinez as Linda Esquivel
- Britt Robertson as Angie McAlister
- Alexander Koch as James 'Junior' Rennie
- Colin Ford as Joe McAlister
- Nicholas Strong as Phil Bushey
- Jolene Purdy as Dodee Weaver
- Aisha Hinds as Carolyn Hill
- Jeff Fahey as Sheriff Howard 'Duke' Perkins
- Dean Norris as James 'Big Jim' Rennie

=== Recurring ===
- Samantha Mathis as Dr. Alice Calvert
- Mackenzie Lintz as Norrie Calvert-Hill
- Beth Broderick as Rose Twitchell
- Dale Raoul as Andrea Grinnell
- John Elvis as Ben Drake
- R. Keith Harris as Peter Shumway
- Kevin Sizemore as Paul Randolph
- Josh Carter as Eric 'Rusty' Denton
- Ned Bellamy as Reverend Lester Coggins
- Leon Rippy as Ollie Dinsmore
- Joe Knezevich as Freddy Denton
- Andrew Vogel as Carter Thibodeau
- Crystal Martinez as Nurse Adams
- Megan Ketch as Harriet Arnold
- Natalie Zea as Maxine Seagrave
- Mare Winningham as Agatha Seagrave

== Production ==
Brian K. Vaughan and Stephen King served as executive producers along with Neal Baer, Justin Falvey, Darryl Frank, Jack Bender, Steven Spielberg, and Stacey Snider. Danish director Niels Arden Oplev produced and directed the pilot. Baer served as the showrunner for the series.

Days before the series premiere aired on U.S. television, the cast and executive producers of Under the Dome met in Wilmington, North Carolina on June 20, 2013, for an advance screening of the pilot episode. During the presentation event, the city's mayor, Bill Saffo, declared Monday, June 24, 2013, as "Dome Day", and awarded Stephen King a key to the city.

On June 24, 2013, the night of the series premiere, entertainment website Vulture published an article about the economics of Under the Dome; in order to bring the expensive production (an estimated $3 million per episode) to life, CBS had struck a deal with Amazon Video that would bring new episodes to the platform four days after they debuted on CBS. That deal, estimated at $750,000 for each episode, covered one quarter of each episode's estimated production cost. Additionally, the article says that foreign markets also played an important role in the financing, bringing in approximately $1.9 million, and with the North Carolina state tax credits the show earned for filming in the state, an estimated $400,000, meant CBS had already earned back the money they paid for each episode before the episodes even aired on TV. CBS president and CEO Leslie Moonves described the deals: "Combining Amazon with the international syndication deal makes Under the Dome profitable immediately".

== Episodes ==
No. overall	No. in season	Title	Directed by	Written by	Original release date	US viewers (millions)
1	1	"Pilot"	Niels Arden Oplev	Brian K. Vaughan	June 24, 2013	13.53
Dale "Barbie" Barbara buries a man's body in the woods of Chester's Mill. As he is leaving the town, an invisible barrier descends on the borders of the township. Local newspaper reporter Julia Shumway, who was investigating mysterious propane deliveries, takes a special interest in Barbie after he saves the life of teenager Joe McAlister, whose parents are trapped out of town. Town councilman James "Big Jim" Rennie makes an emergency radio announcement, while police chief Duke Perkins and his deputy Linda Esquivel try to quell the rise of panic in the town. Big Jim's unstable son Junior kidnaps Angie McAlister when he begins to suspect she had an affair with Barbie. Carolyn Hill and her partner Alice Calvert are passing through Chester's Mill with their daughter Norrie when the barrier appears and Norrie has what they think is an epileptic seizure. Julia takes Barbie into her home, where he realizes the man he buried was her husband. Duke suggests to Linda that the entire town is being punished and is about to reveal a dark secret about the town when his pacemaker explodes as he approaches the barrier. The U.S. military descends upon Chester's Mill as the world learns of the phenomenon.
2	2	"The Fire"	Jack Bender	Rick Cleveland	July 1, 2013	11.81
When Barbie realizes he left his dog tags at the cabin where he killed Julia's husband, he heads back to retrieve them but is ambushed by Junior, who believes Angie is involved with him. At the radio station, Dodee and Phil pick up a military frequency discussing the dome and Julia commandeers the microphone to broadcast the information. While exploring, Joe and his friend Ben notice that the military is testing to see if water can get through the dome. Meanwhile, Big Jim has Reverend Coggins destroy the propane shipment records at Duke's house, but Coggins accidentally starts a fire while burning the evidence. Linda hears Coggins yell for help and pulls him out of the house, but the fire spreads when a nearby propane tank explodes, forcing the town to form a bucket brigade. Big Jim, who had ignored Coggins' cries for help, uses a tractor to contain the fire. Moments later, a hysterical Deputy Paul Randolph shoots his gun at the dome, but the bullet ricochets off it and kills Deputy Freddy.
3	3	"Manhunt"	Paul Edwards	Adam Stein	July 8, 2013	10.71
Deputy Paul Randolph, locked up after accidentally killing Deputy Freddy, escapes his jail cell and locks Linda inside. Big Jim organizes a search party to find Paul by recruiting other townsmen and Barbie, while Linda resolves to find Paul on her own. In the woods, Paul sneaks up on Barbie and Big Jim to hold them at gunpoint, and Linda shows up and shoots Paul. Big Jim designates Linda as the new Sheriff. Julia tails Junior into the tunnels under the cement plant, where he is looking to find a way out. Junior hits the barrier of the dome. Meanwhile, Joe and Norrie find themselves in the middle of a party as Ben invites everyone in town to charge their electronics using Joe's generator. The party ends when the generator blows. Norrie and Joe touch hands and start having simultaneous seizures, repeating the same cryptic phrase "pink stars are falling."
4	4	"Outbreak"	Kari Skogland	Peter Calloway	July 15, 2013	11.13
After Julia learns that Phil and Barbie are connected to her husband Peter, she questions Phil about Peter's whereabouts, but he passes out from an unexpected illness. As other townspeople including Linda begin to display similar symptoms, Alice volunteers her help at the clinic and discerns the town is suffering from meningitis. Junior enforces a quarantine of the clinic and pacifies the panicked patients attempting to break out. With a waning supply of antibiotics, Big Jim and Barbie head to the pharmacy but discover Reverend Coggins had already taken all the medicine, believing it was God's plan for the infected to die. Big Jim retrieves the antibiotics to treat the diseased while Barbie tracks down Julia at the cabin where she had followed leads to uncover documentation of Peter's bankruptcy. Meanwhile, Joe and Norrie experiment with their simultaneous seizures while Big Jim finds Angie in the underground shelter.
5	5	"Blue on Blue"	Jack Bender	Brian K. Vaughan	July 22, 2013	11.60
Despite finding Angie in the shelter, Jim leaves her locked up, unable to believe his son would do such a thing. Meanwhile, the military has scheduled a visitors' day for the residents of Chester's Mill, where family members of people trapped in the dome can come and visit their loved ones at a designated spot along the barrier. Barbie finds out from a soldier that the military plans to attempt to destroy the dome with a missile, which will likely kill everyone inside. Big Jim orders everyone to take shelter in the tunnels underneath the city. He then releases Angie from her captivity, and Junior sets off after her. As most of the town prepares for the inevitable, Joe and Norrie search for Angie, Junior finds Angie at her house and they spend what they believe will be their last moments together. As the missile approaches, Norrie and Joe share a kiss. The missile impacts the dome, laying waste to everything outside of it but leaving the dome and town unscathed. As Big Jim investigates the edge of the dome, he is approached by Reverend Coggins, who is killed when Jim pushes his head into the dome, causing his hearing aid to explode.
6	6	"The Endless Thirst"	Kari Skogland	Soo Hugh	July 29, 2013	11.41
After the town's water tower is inadvertently destroyed and the lake is found to be polluted, Barbie helps Linda stop the looting that breaks out in response to the waning resources. Angie tells Rose about her captivity by Junior and asks for her help, but they are accosted by the Dundee boys who loot the diner, killing Rose and knocking Angie unconscious. Barbie intervenes to rescue Angie and a rainstorm occurs and ends the chaos. Following his trade with Ollie Densmore for the town's use of Ollie's well in exchange for propane, Big Jim gives Angie the offer to protect her and Joe as long as she keeps her imprisonment by Junior a secret. After Julia and Dodee speculate that the source of the radio signal jam could be the answer to the dome's origin, Dodee fashions a radio direction finding device that leads them to Joe and Norrie, who are on a search to find insulin to save Alice. The teenagers shock Julia and Dodee when they show them the video of their seizures and end the signal jam by touching the dome together.
7	7	"Imperfect Circles"	Miguel Sapochnik	Caitlin Parrish	August 5, 2013	10.42
Feeling his authority threatened, Big Jim takes matters into his own hands. Julia's friend, Harriet, touches the dome and goes into labor so Julia takes her to the hospital. They are gas-jacked by the two Dundee brothers, but Barbie arrives and the two flee. Barbie then takes the woman in labor to Alice to help them. While that's happening, Junior and Big Jim argue about Junior disturbing Angie. Junior goes to the police station and goes with Linda to find the two murderers. Junior realizes that they are at an abandoned house and gets told by Linda that one of them almost raped Angie. Linda kills one of the brothers during a fight. Junior kills the other for the attempted murder when he tries to escape. Big Jim then checks on the city's stockpiled propane; however, he is stopped by an armed thug. Joe and Norrie try to find the center of the dome, finding a second mini-dome that holds a mysterious egg in it. Alice has a heart attack and dies in Norrie's arms. In the mini-dome, the egg's shell begins to light up, with pink-colored lights on the surface of the egg.
8	8	"Thicker Than Water"	Jack Bender	Adam Stein	August 12, 2013	10.36
At night, Junior comes home but Big Jim points a gun at him and tells him to leave. The next morning, Big Jim confronts Ollie and gets Barbie, Linda, Junior and Carter to take the well from Ollie. As Jim is rounding up volunteers to attack Ollie's farm, Barbie and Linda plan to blow up the well so that the other well's water will return. Jim then realizes that Barbie is going to go ahead with bombing Ollie's well. While everyone realizes that the well has been destroyed, Junior appears and knocks Jim out with his gun. Big Jim is dragged into Ollie's living room and Ollie's men leave saying that they no longer need his water. Ollie then gives permission for Junior to kill Big Jim but instead, Junior asks Jim questions about his mother and upon hearing the truth about his mother's death, Ollie draws his gun to kill Big Jim and Junior shoots and kills Ollie. Big Jim and Junior then reconcile before parting ways. At the police station, Linda is surprised to see Junior back and he tells her what happened. Joe tells Julia about the mini-dome and the egg and both go to see it. It is then hinted that Angie may also be connected to the dome as evidenced by the camera panning across her shoulder blade to show a tattoo of a butterfly.
9	9	"The Fourth Hand"	Roxann Dawson	Daniel Truly	August 19, 2013	10.64
Julia takes Barbie to see the mini-dome and the egg, but they have both disappeared. Barbie and Linda find a highly strung out drug addict who is undergoing withdrawal symptoms from Rapture, a drug that he had purchased from Reverend Coggins. A thorough search by Linda and Barbie uncovers drug-making equipment in one of Reverend Coggins' coffins. Angie takes over the diner, and tells Big Jim to give her the diner's deed, free and clear. Junior brings Angie back home after a seizure similar to Joe and Norrie's. Norrie notices Angie's butterfly tattoo and wonders if she is the "monarch". Junior takes Angie to his house and shows her a painting his mother made before she died, that was of him as a child with pink stars falling around him. Julia tries to borrow the directional antenna from Dodee but Dodee says that it isn't working anymore. Big Jim receives an unexpected visitor – Maxine, a business partner who created Rapture. She was trapped under the dome because she had decided to pay Big Jim a visit on the day the dome fell over Chester's Mill. Maxine visits Big Jim and Barbie, and before Big Jim can introduce Barbie, Maxine walks up to Barbie and kisses him, revealing that she and Barbie are old acquaintances. Maxine blackmails Barbie into joining her and Big Jim and threatens to tell Julia that Barbie killed her husband. The egg disappears from its location and Joe and Norrie find it in the barn at his house. Angie reveals to them that Joe brought it home at 3 am. Angie kneels down and puts her hand on the mini-dome, and as it lights up blue, Joe and Norrie follow suit and as they're touching three quadrants, a blue handprint illuminates and they realize they need a fourth hand.
10	10	"Let the Games Begin"	Sergio Mimica-Gezzan	Andres Fischer-Centeno & Peter Calloway	August 26, 2013	11.11
Linda takes Julia to help investigate Duke's involvement with previous criminal activity in Chester's Mill. During their investigation, Linda finds a note from Duke saying that after his son died from a drug addiction, he vowed to get drugs out of the town by making a deal with Maxine; he and others bought the propane she needed, and she would keep drugs out of the town. She finds out that Barbie killed her husband, but she interprets it as Peter wanting to die due to his overwhelming debt. Big Jim finds a house on a nearby island that Maxine is supposedly hiding at, and finds the house's caretaker Agatha, revealed to be Maxine's mother, having given birth to her young. Joe, Angie, and Norrie touch the mini-dome in their barn simultaneously. The dome then reveals a fourth handprint. Angie shows Norris and Joe a painting Junior's mother made of a dream she had, depicting Junior and "pink stars falling in lines." The three then take Junior to the barn, and as the four of them touch the dome, the egg in the middle releases pink stars all over the barn walls.
11	11	"Speak of the Devil"	David Barrett	Scott Gold	September 2, 2013	11.15
Big Jim turns the town against Barbie and forms a manhunt after the truth about his past is revealed. Junior decides to leave the three and forget about the mini-dome. As funnel clouds appear and grow, the wind picks up a bench, which almost hits Angie, but is saved by Junior. The clouds then subside. Junior and Angie then realize that the dome wants him to stick with the three. Julia is shot by Maxine, but as the clouds subside, and Julia's heart begins to beat again. Later, Barbie gets Big Jim's help to take down Maxine without any death. The two head to Maxine's underground club and the power then goes out from Barbie's activated alarm. Barbie and Big Jim then steal their guns and lead them outside. Big Jim kills both Maxine and the gunman, and tries to shoot Barbie, but fails. Big Jim accuses Barbie of killing the two to Linda. Norrie, Joe, Angie and Junior touch the bigger dome at the same time, and see a vision of Big Jim bleeding from three stab wounds and a bloody nose. The vision then has the four holding four bloody knives. The other three then consider that in order for the dome to come down, they have to kill Big Jim.
12	12	"Exigent Circumstances"	Peter Leto	Adam Stein & Caitlin Parrish	September 9, 2013	9.72
As Barbie hides in the woods, Big Jim gives a speech to the townspeople convincing them to continue the search. During the radio transmissions, Dodee remembers what happened to her when she touched the mini-dome. She takes Big Jim to the radio station and tells him about the egg in the mini-dome. Big Jim hears the people on the transmission discuss past events that occurred in the dome, including Reverend Coggins's murder. Dodee overhears this, and realizes that Big Jim was responsible for his death. To show Jim that she is still trustworthy, she tells him about the egg. Big Jim ends up killing Dodee and burning the station, blaming Barbie for arson. However, the egg is no longer in the barn; Joe's friend Ben has hidden the mini-dome in his house. The mini-dome is forced to be covered in blankets after a piercing noise begins. Ben, Joe, Norrie, and Carolyn take off the blankets to find the dome glowing orange. Julia wakes up with Angie helping her recollect. Big Jim walks Barbie to the front of town hall, where many angry townspeople wait for Barbie's guilty plea. He pleads not guilty.
13	13	"Curtains"	Jack Bender	Brian K. Vaughan & Scott Gold	September 16, 2013	12.10
The monarch hatches, and the butterfly starts flying around inside the mini dome violently and creating expanding black spots where it crashes against the surface. These spots are mirrored in the big dome and begin to expand, casting the town into darkness. Junior, Angie, Joe, and Norrie then touch the dome together, the mini dome shatters releasing both the egg and butterfly, where they discover that the Monarch is Julia. They receive a visit from one of the dome's people. The visitor states that they have taken Alice's form to "bridge the divide", and that the reason for the dome is to protect them. Big Jim puts Barbie in a noose and then Julia has to choose to save the egg and the lives of the town, or save Barbie by giving the egg to Big Jim within one hour. She chooses the egg and protects it by throwing it into the lake. The egg starts to glow, and pink stars rise to the sky, where they remove the dark black "curtain", replacing it with a curtain of piercing bright white light.

== Reception ==
=== Critical reception ===
The first season has a score of 68/100, based on 45 reviews, indicating "generally favorable" reviews, on review aggregator website Metacritic. The season has a score of 83/100, based on 52 reviews, on film and TV review aggregator Rotten Tomatoes; the site's critical consensus for the season reads: "Under the Dome is an effective and engrossing horror/mystery with airtight plotting and great special effects."

Positive reviews included Tim Goodman of The Hollywood Reporter, who wrote that "the intriguing Stephen King adaption is filled with storytelling promise", Glenn Garvin of the Miami Herald, who wrote that "based on the pilot episode — with its taut script, strong performances and special effects that are impressive without being overwhelming — there’s hope that Under The Dome might measure up to its unsettling print progenitor", and Verne Gay of Newsday, who wrote that the show "looks like a summer winner". A negative review came from Matthew Gilbert of The Boston Globe, who wrote that "so much is working against Under the Dome, it’s hard to get genuinely excited. While the arrival of the dome is intriguing, the characters are not".

=== Ratings ===
Viewership and ratings per episode of Under the Dome season 1
No.	Title	Air date	Rating/share (18–49)	Viewers (millions)
1	"Pilot"	June 24, 2013	3.3/9	13.53
2	"The Fire"	July 1, 2013	2.9/8	11.81
3	"Manhunt"	July 8, 2013	2.7/8	10.71
4	"Outbreak"	July 15, 2013	2.7/8	11.13
5	"Blue on Blue"	July 22, 2013	2.8/8	11.60
6	"The Endless Thirst"	July 29, 2013	2.8/8	11.41
7	"Imperfect Circles"	August 5, 2013	2.6/7	10.42
8	"Thicker Than Water"	August 12, 2013	2.4/7	10.36
9	"The Fourth Hand"	August 19, 2013	2.4/7	10.64
10	"Let the Games Begin"	August 26, 2013	2.5/7	11.11
11	"Speak of the Devil"	September 2, 2013	2.7/8	11.15
12	"Exigent Circumstances"	September 9, 2013	2.1/6	9.72
13	"Curtains"	September 16, 2013	2.8/9	12.10
