= Exigent Circumstances (Under the Dome) =

- Under the Dome episode
- Episode no.: Season 1 Episode 12
- Directed by: Peter Leto
- Written by: Adam Stein & Caitlin Parrish
- Original air date: September 9, 2013

Guest appearances
- Jason Alexander Davis as Miles Alcott; Crystal Martinez as Nurse Adams; Jay Gates as fire volunteer; Kevin Cassidy as Thug #1; Benjamin Rowe as Thug #2; Chris Johnson as Thug #3

Episode chronology
← Previous "Speak of the Devil"	Next → "Curtains"
- Under the Dome (season 1)

"Exigent Circumstances" is the twelfth and penultimate episode of the first season of the CBS drama Under the Dome. It aired on September 9, 2013.

Commentators wrote positively about the episode, with many applauding the episode's appropriate use of the supporting characters and suspense before the season finale. Upon airing, the episode was watched by 9.72 million viewers and received an 18-49 rating of 2.1, marking season low ratings.

== Plot ==
As Barbie (Mike Vogel) hides in the woods, Big Jim (Dean Norris) gives a speech to the townspeople convincing them to continuously search for Barbie, with Linda (Natalie Martinez) enforcing rules of security. Dodee (Jolene Purdy) later reveals to Big Jim, after hearing radio transmissions from the military, that Barbie is being searched for from outside the dome. During the radio transmissions, Dodee remembers what happened to her days ago when she touched the mini-dome. She takes Big Jim to the radio station and tells him about the egg in the mini-dome. She then leaves the room for a moment, where Big Jim hears the people on the transmission discuss past events that occurred in the dome, including Reverend Coggins's (Ned Bellamy) murder. Dodee overhears the transmission, realizing that Big Jim was responsible for his death and other past crimes in the town. Big Jim tells her he did it to protect the town, and also wants to make sure the dome does not come down. Dodee then says she hopes for his eventual death, which pushes Big Jim to kill her and burn the station, blaming Barbie for arson.

Joe (Colin Ford), Angie (Britt Robertson), and Norrie (Mackenzie Lintz) grow confused over the vision they witnessed earlier, with the three of them and Junior (Alexander Koch) killing Big Jim. Norrie's mother Carolyn (Aisha Hinds) then discovers the mini-dome, and promises to keep it secret from the town and Big Jim. Big Jim and some volunteers help him break into the barn to find the mini-dome, but find nothing; Joe's friend Ben (John Elvis) has hidden the mini-dome in his house. Big Jim then arrests Joe and Norrie for aiding a vigilante, where he tries to interrogate the two in their cells. In doing so, Norrie stabs him in the arm with a knife she hid away. Joe and Norrie are soon released, and make their way to Ben's house, where he has been covering the dome in blankets after a piercing noise from the egg starts. Ben, Joe, Norrie, and Carolyn take off the blankets to find the dome glowing orange and the monarch cocoon beginning to move. Linda then walks upon the scene.

Barbie later finds Angie and convinces her to protect Julia (Rachelle Lefevre), who is recovering in the hospital from her bullet wound from the previous episode. He worries that Julia will reveal Big Jim's lies and will be killed because of it. Angie manages to distract Junior while Barbie takes Julia's stretcher to a nearby ambulance. Junior attempts to stop him, but Barbie manages to subdue him, and gets Angie to drive the ambulance to a safe place. He is later arrested by Linda for arson and murder of Dodee, with Phil (Nicholas Strong) kicking him in the mouth before being taken away. Julia wakes up with Angie helping her recollect, where she begins to worry over what Big Jim will do to Barbie.

In his cell, Barbie is encouraged by Big Jim to confess to all the charges put on his record, or have those closest to him harmed. Junior then finds Big Jim and demands the truth from him; Big Jim lies to him, saying that Barbie was responsible for everything he is charged for. Conflicted over his father's trustworthiness, Junior walks to the end of the dome, and touches it, hoping for an answer.

Big Jim walks Barbie to the front of town hall, where many angry townspeople wait for Barbie's guilty plea; after a few moments of contemplation, he pleads not guilty.

== Production ==
Neal Baer talked to TV Guide about the events of the episode. In regards to the "monarch [that] will be crowned," Baer said "You will find out who the Monarch is [by the end of the season]." Also, regards to Big Jim's fate, he said "We'll see that. It gets pretty ugly. Remember, nobody is safe." Also, regarding the egg, he said "It's fair to say that the egg won't just sit there."

== Reception ==
=== Ratings ===
The episode was watched by 9.72 million American viewers and received an 18-49 rating of 2.1/6, making it the lowest watched and lowest rated episode of the season. Despite the show's significant drop in ratings, it still managed to place first for the night.

Due to its being delayed during its original broadcast, the episode was repeated on Saturday September 14, 2013.

=== Critical reception ===
Matt Fowler of IGN gave the episode a positive review, calling it "the best episode of the show since the pilot, and nicely set up next week's finale. Not only was it more focused than usual, but it made me feel, for the first time in a long while, that Chester's Mill was a town full of people and not just a game board with a handful of players. Jim actually addressed the citizens, explaining a few things about laws and job placement. I suppose it's nice to have someone in charge, even if that person's got a few screws loose."

Andrea Reiher of Zap2it gave the episode a moderate review. She had some suggestions about the townspeople's role in the episode, saying "The only thing we wish the show would have done with this episode is have Big Jim plant the people in the audience in the diner who were shouting about house searches and how normal U.S. rights do not apply. He did that in the book -- he set up scenarios where he "had" to enact martial law. Maybe that'll crop up in Season 2;" she commented negatively on "the sappy moment where Barbie tells Julia he loves her. No time, dude! Get her out of there!" She then reacted positively to "the Carolyn-Norrie relationship now that Alice is gone. We hope to see more of that. We also love Aisha Hinds as Carolyn, what a great character," and Dodee's storyline, saying "what a great send-off for Dodee. She stood up. She knew she was going to die and she told Big Jim what an a-hole he is while tears streamed down her face. Terrific ending for her and kudos to Jolene Purdy for that scene."

Ted Kindig of BuddyTV gave the episode a negative review, mainly focusing on the season's remaining questions, saying "As season 1 of Under the Dome begins to draw to a close, it's becoming increasingly unlikely that we're going to get any real answers about the dome this year. What remains to be seen, then, is whether or not this show has asked the right questions: will viewers ponder the significance of pink stars for months? Are we invested in Barbie enough to keep him on our minds through the winter? Are we even confident that this story is going anywhere? I certainly had those concerns on my mind during this week's episode, and I can't say I found much to reassure me."

In regards to the scene with Angie and Junior's intimate moment at the hospital, Darren Franich of Entertainment Weekly called the moment "the most accidentally funny moment of the summer," as after the kiss, "Junior pulled away. Looked horrified, and betrayed. Quote: "You taste like cigarettes." CRAZY MUSIC ON THE SOUNDTRACK as Junior runs away. (She’s borrowed a cigarette from Barbie, which is a reference to the pilot of this show, which happened about ninety episodes ago I think.)"
