= Let the Games Begin (Under the Dome) =

- Under the Dome episode
- Episode no.: Season 1 Episode 10
- Directed by: Sergio Mimica-Gezzan
- Written by: Andres Fischer-Centeno & Peter Calloway
- Original air date: August 26, 2013

Guest appearances
- Natalie Zea as Maxine; Berry Newkirk as Hoodie guy; Derek Roberts as Duncan; Crystal Martinez as Nurse Adams; Mare Winningham as Agatha; Rey Hernandez as Otto; Matt Murray as Victor

Episode chronology
← Previous "The Fourth Hand"	Next → "Speak of the Devil"
- Under the Dome (season 1)

"Let the Games Begin" is the tenth episode of the first season of the CBS drama Under the Dome. It aired on August 26, 2013.

Upon airing, the episode was watched by 11.11 million viewers, and received an 18-49 rating of 2.5. This presented a ratings increase from the previous episode. However, despite a ratings increase, commentators reacted moderately to negatively to the episode, with most commenting negatively on the episode's sub-plots.

== Plot ==
Linda (Natalie Martinez) takes Julia (Rachelle Lefevre) to help investigate Duke's (Jeff Fahey) involvement with criminal activity in Chester's Mill. During their investigation, Linda finds a note from Duke saying that after his son died from a drug addiction, he vowed to get drugs out of the town by making a deal with Maxine (Natalie Zea); he and others bought the propane she needed, and she would keep drugs out of the town; Reverend Lester (Ned Bellamy) then laundered the proceeds and Big Jim (Dean Norris) bought the propane. Julia then finds out that her husband Peter (R. Keith Harris) filed a five-year life insurance policy on himself. She later finds out that Barbie (Mike Vogel) killed him, but she interprets it as Peter wanting to die due to his overwhelming debt.

Maxine proves to Barbie that she intends on taking over the town after she shows him an underground black market fight club. She then blackmails Barbie into fighting Victor (Matt Murray), an old rival of his. He begins to win, but then throws the match, something Maxine expected him to do. Later, Maxine tries to seduce Barbie and threaten to reveal his secrets, but Barbie then leaves saying that he is done with her.

Big Jim finds a house on a nearby island at which Maxine is supposedly hiding, and finds the house's caretaker Agatha (Mare Winningham). Jim begins to look through the house, with Agatha eventually pulling a gun and revealing she is Maxine's mother, having given birth to her at age 16 and dropping out of high school. She then tells Jim that she knows as much as Maxine does about the town, especially about him and Barbie's secrets. Big Jim then intimidates her, saying that she doesn't have the courage to kill. He then grabs the gun from her and takes her to his boat. While on the boat, Agatha falls into the water, and cannot swim as her hands are tied up. She pleads for Jim to pull her up, but he leaves her to drown. That night, he heads home to find Linda waiting for him, telling him to meet her at the police station the next day for questioning.

Joe (Colin Ford), Angie (Britt Robertson), and Norrie (Mackenzie Lintz) touch the mini-dome in their barn simultaneously with the egg in the middle beginning to glow. The dome then reveals a fourth handprint, implying that a fourth hand is required to touch the dome. The three promise not to tell anyone as they search for the fourth person. Dodee (Jolene Purdy) then sneaks into the barn and touches the mini-dome. She is then shocked and knocked out. The three kids then take her to the hospital and tell her that she electrocuted herself while fixing her generator. Angie then asks Nurse Adams if any people have recently had seizures, and she replies saying not since her Grade 10 dance. Angie later tells Joe and Norrie that Junior (Alexander Koch) had a seizure during that dance. She then tells them that she was kidnapped by Junior. Joe vows to get revenge on Junior, but not before Angie takes the two to Junior's house to show them a painting Junior's mother made of a dream she had, depicting Junior and "pink stars falling in lines." Junior then finds them in the basement, and Joe runs toward him, but is put in a choke hold. Angie demands Junior let Joe go, and he does. The three then take Junior to the barn as the "fourth hand." After the four of them touch the dome, the egg in the middle releases pink stars all over the barn walls. The four are astonished, though Junior looks confused, asking them what it means.

== Reception ==
=== Ratings ===
The episode was watched by 11.11 million American viewers, and received an 18-49 rating/share of 2.5/7, a rise from the previous episode. This is also the most watched episode since "The Endless Thirst." The show also placed first in its timeslot and for the night.

=== Critical reception ===
The episode received mixed reviews from most professional critics. Ted Kindig of BuddyTV gave the episode a mixed to negative review, saying Junior's subplot "is pretty gross for a number of reasons, but perhaps the most disappointing thing about it is that it distracts from the episode's far more interesting subplot about Max's organized crime ring. The "darkness inside" type material is arriving messy and late, but it's what the show's been best at so far—Junior's radical transformation into a chess piece of dome destiny just makes it seem like the showrunners didn't plan this out very well." Andrea Reiher of Zap2it also gave the episode a mixed to negative review, saying "The Big Jim-Agatha storyline seemed rather superfluous. What was the point? If it was only to demonstrate that Jim is morphing into a bad guy, there are other ways to do so. Sure, it'll hurt Maxine, but ... hmm. Still seems kind of random." She also said "we didn't love Maxine last week, but this episode just seemed completely random. We're excited to find out the mini-dome stuff, but this episode didn't really advance that much. Felt more like a place-holder." Ashley Knierim of The Huffington Post said regarding the show's plot "We're only three episodes away from the end of the season, and it's pretty clear the writers have decided to have a few drinks and write whatever pops into their minds."
