= Speak of the Devil (Under the Dome) =

- Under the Dome episode
- Episode no.: Season 1 Episode 11
- Directed by: David Barrett
- Written by: Scott Gold
- Original air date: September 2, 2013

Guest appearances
- Natalie Zea as Maxine; Crystal Martinez as Nurse Adams; Rey Hernandez as Otto; Christy Grantham as frantic woman; Mare Winningham as Agatha

Episode chronology
← Previous "Let the Games Begin"	Next → "Exigent Circumstances"
- Under the Dome (season 1)

"Speak of the Devil" is the eleventh episode of the first season of the CBS drama Under the Dome. It aired on September 2, 2013.

== Plot ==
Joe (Colin Ford), Norrie (Mackenzie Lintz), Angie (Britt Robertson), and Junior (Alexander Koch) release their grip from the mini-dome and see white spots all over the barn, which are supposed to link up the constellations that they created. Later, Junior tries again to seduce Angie, with her replying that a relationship will never happen. Junior then decides to leave the three kids and forget about the mini-dome. As this happens, funnel clouds begin to appear in the sky. Junior then heads home and finds his father Big Jim (Dean Norris), who arms him with a gun and bullets saying to stay at the house and beware of Maxine (Natalie Zea), who is threatening to hurt those closest to him. Angie then heads to the house pleading for Junior to return and help her, Joe and Norrie with a situation with the mini-dome. As the funnel cloud grows, the wind picks up a bench, which almost hits Angie, but is saved by Junior. The clouds then begin to subside. Junior and Angie then realize that the dome wants him to stick with the three kids.

Julia (Rachelle Lefevre) is shot by Maxine after Barbie (Mike Vogel) rejected her in the previous episode. Barbie then gets Joe to drive them to the hospital. When they got there and see that the nurses are busy with other tornado-related emergencies, Barbie is forced to heal Julia's wounds. While feeding oxygen into her through a small tube, her heart stops. As this happens, a branch flies through the window, with Barbie pushing Joe out of the way. The clouds then subside, and Julia's heart begins to beat again. Joe then concludes that Barbie is the "monarch [that] will be crowned."

Later, Barbie gets Big Jim's help to take down Maxine without any death on their part. The two head to Maxine's underground club, but are ambushed by Maxine and a gunman. She says how she wants revenge for the murder of her mother Agatha (Mare Winningham), and that she wants to live a life with Barbie, but he rejects her advances. The power then goes out from Barbie's activated alarm which cut the power. Barbie and Big Jim then steal their guns and lead them outside. Barbie then leaves, telling Maxine "You're done." As he walks off, Big Jim kills both Maxine and the gunman. Big Jim then tries to shoot Barbie, but he punches him in the throat and steals the gun. Linda (Natalie Martinez) then appears and Big Jim lies, saying that Barbie killed the two. Throughout the episode, Linda has been finding false evidence that concludes that Barbie is a dangerous felon. Barbie runs off before anything can happen to him.

Big Jim later heads to the radio station and finds Dodee (Jolene Purdy), who during the storm managed to gain access to a message from the military, saying that they have found Barbie. Big Jim hears this message, and then goes on the radio, framing Barbie for numerous crimes that occurred over the past few days.

Norrie convinces Joe, Angie and Junior to touch the bigger dome at the same time. Upon doing so, the four see a vision of Big Jim bleeding from three stab wounds and a bloody nose. The vision then has the four holding four bloody knives, with Junior running off. The three others then consider that in order for the dome to come down, they have to kill Big Jim.

== Reception ==
=== Ratings ===
The episode aired on September 2, 2013, and was watched by 11.15 million American viewers, and received a 2.7/8 rating/share among adults 18-49. This marks the highest rated and most watched episode since the episode "The Endless Thirst," which aired July 29, 2013 and received a 2.8/8 rating/share.

=== Critical reception ===
Tucker Cummings of Yahoo! TV said the episode "might have just set the bar as the most action-packed to date, with notable characters getting shot at the beginning and end of the episode." Andrea Reiher of Zap2it said "The majority of the Under the Dome book is about Big Jim "wanting a kingdom" and slowly but surely wresting control of the town away from anyone who might get in his way. Chiefly standing in his way are Julia and Barbie, so now the show has finally gone down the dark and twisted path we were expecting. Thumbs up."
