= 40th Saturn Awards =

US film and television award ceremony

- Date: June 26, 2014
- Site: Burbank, California, U.S.

Highlights
- Most awards: Gravity (5)
- Most nominations: Gravity; The Hobbit: The Desolation of Smaug (8)

The 40th Saturn Awards, honoring the best in science fiction, fantasy and horror film and television in 2013, was held on June 26, 2014, in Burbank, California. The awards were presented by the Academy of Science Fiction, Fantasy and Horror Films. The nominations were announced February 25, 2014.

== Overview ==
In the film categories, Gravity won five of its eight nominations, including Best Science Fiction Film, Best Director for Alfonso Cuarón, and Best Actress for Sandra Bullock. In the television categories, Breaking Bad and The Walking Dead each won three awards, respectively. Breaking Bad won Best Television Presentation and The Walking Dead won Best Syndicated/Cable Television Series.

Two new categories were added this year, Best Comic-to-Film Motion Picture and Best Performance by a Younger Actor in a Television Series. Adaptations of comic-books were usually nominated in the fantasy or science fiction categories, while the Academy of Science Fiction, Fantasy and Horror Films was previously only rewarding young actors in motion pictures. The Saturn Award for Best Horror or Thriller Film was also split into two categories: Best Horror and Best Thriller. With Chandler Riggs's nomination for Best Performance by a Younger Actor in TV Series, The Walking Dead became the first series to be nominated in all six television acting categories of the Saturn Awards. Riggs went on to win the award.

Writer/producer Bryan Fuller received the Dan Curtis Legacy Award. Actor Malcolm McDowell received The Life Career Award. Special effects creator Greg Nicotero received The George Pal Memorial Award and author Marc Cushman received a Special Recognition Award for his recent Star Trek book publications.

== Winners and nominees ==
=== Film ===
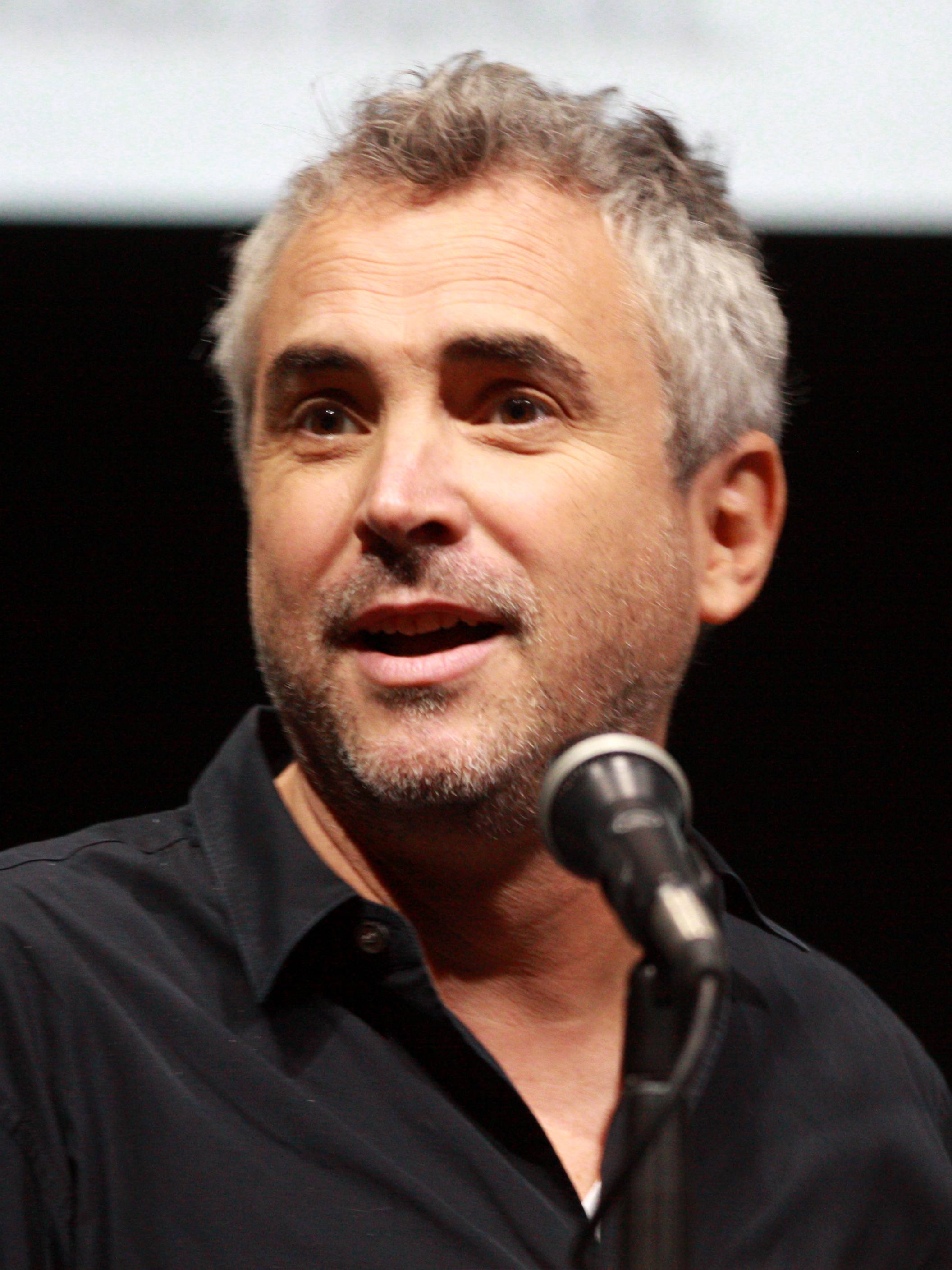
Alfonso Cuarón received the Best Director and Best Editing awards for Gravity, which also won Best Science Fiction Film.

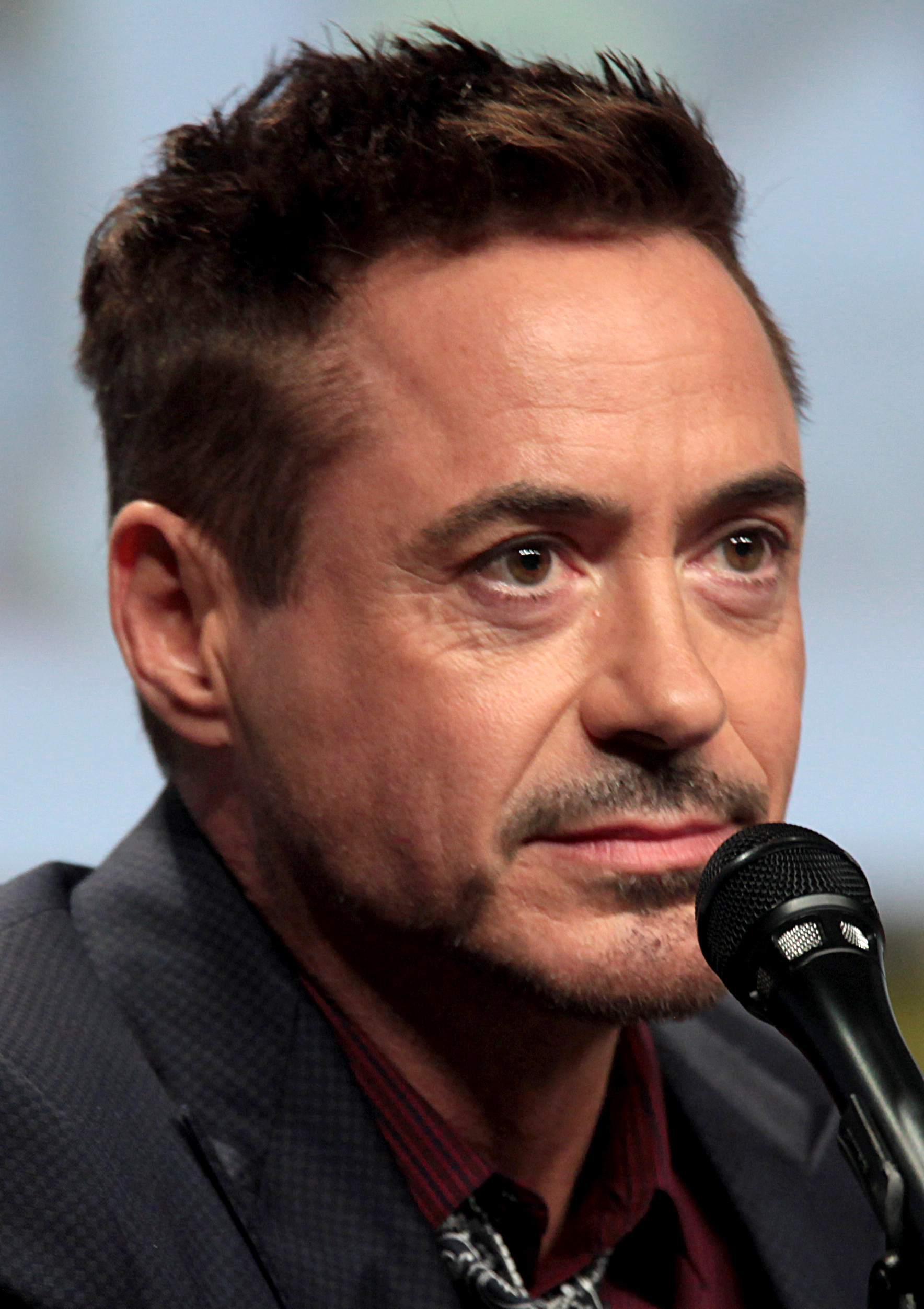
Robert Downey Jr. received the Best Actor award for Iron Man 3, his third win in six nominations.

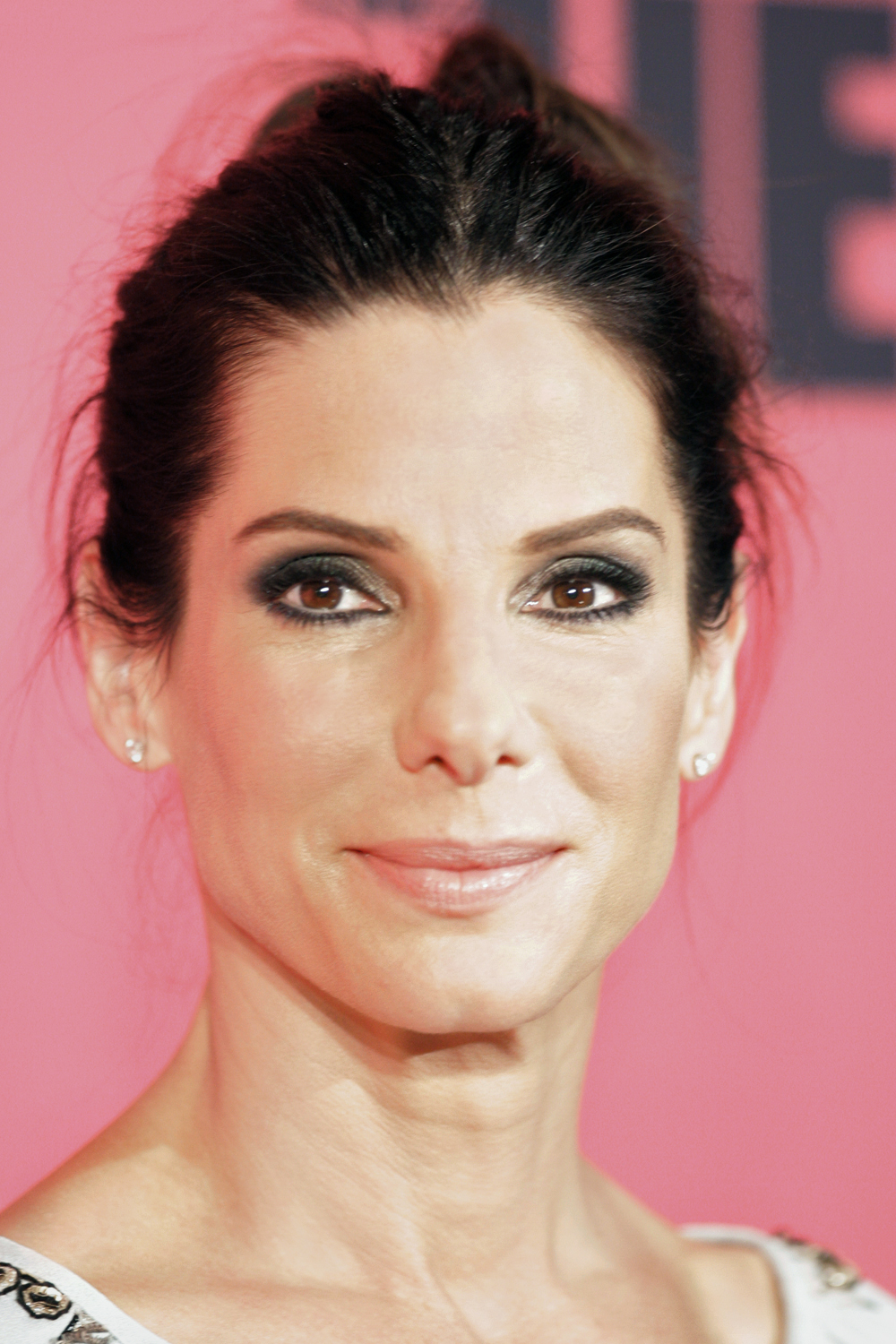
Sandra Bullock received the Best Actress award for Gravity, her second win.

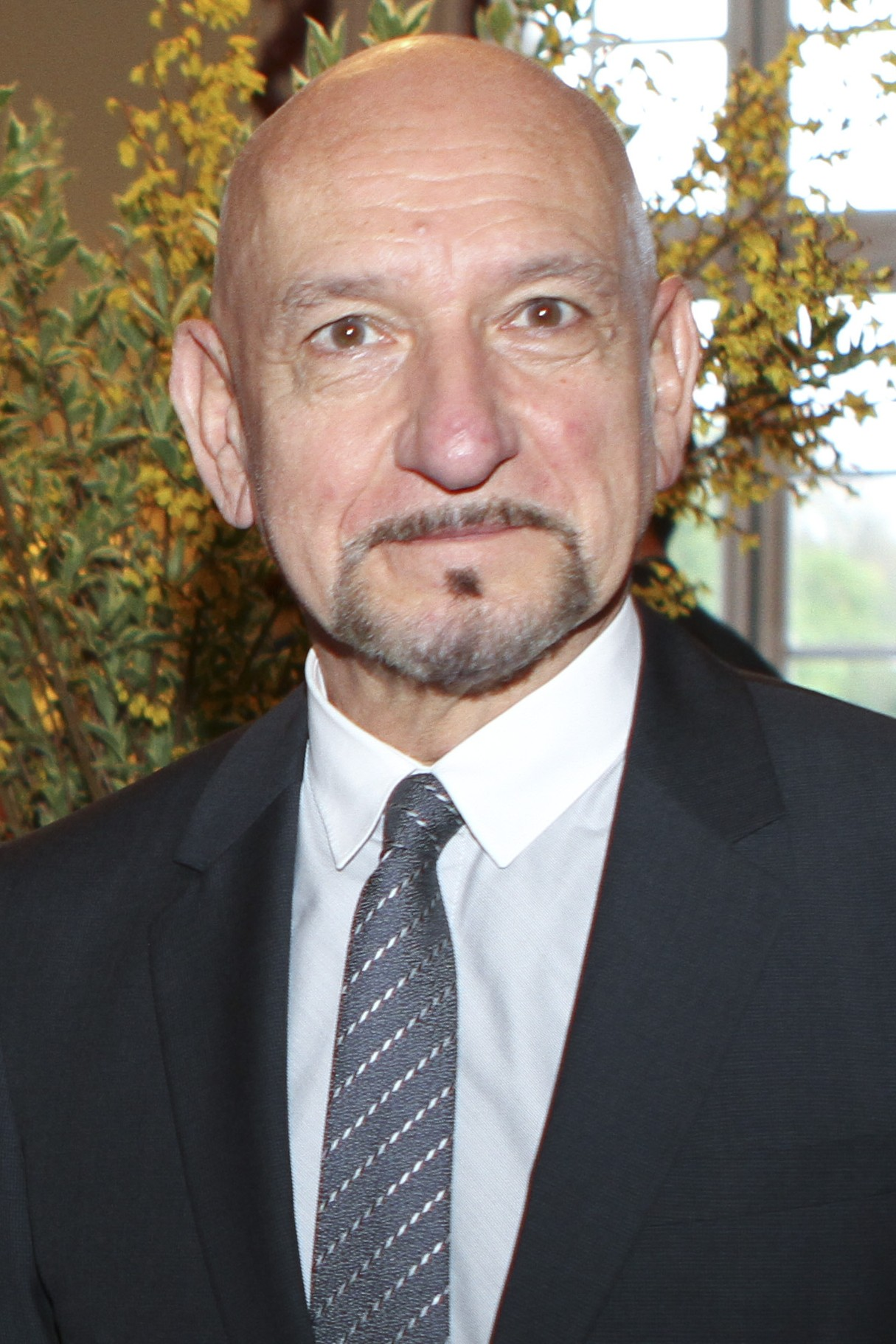
Sir Ben Kingsley received the Best Supporting Actor award for Iron Man 3.

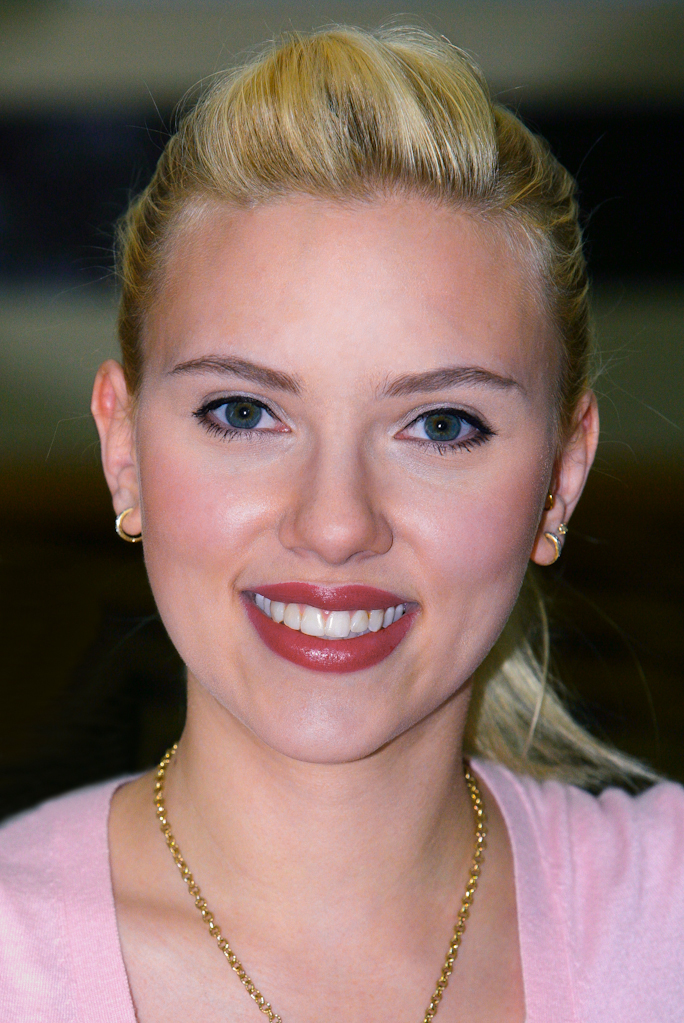
Scarlett Johansson received the Best Supporting Actress award for Her, her first win in two nominations.

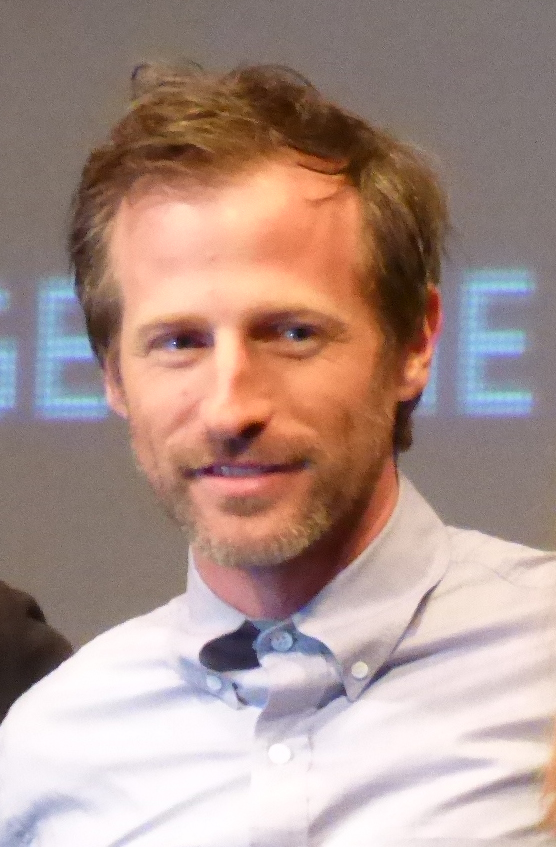
Spike Jonze received the Best Writing award for Her, which also won Best Fantasy Film.

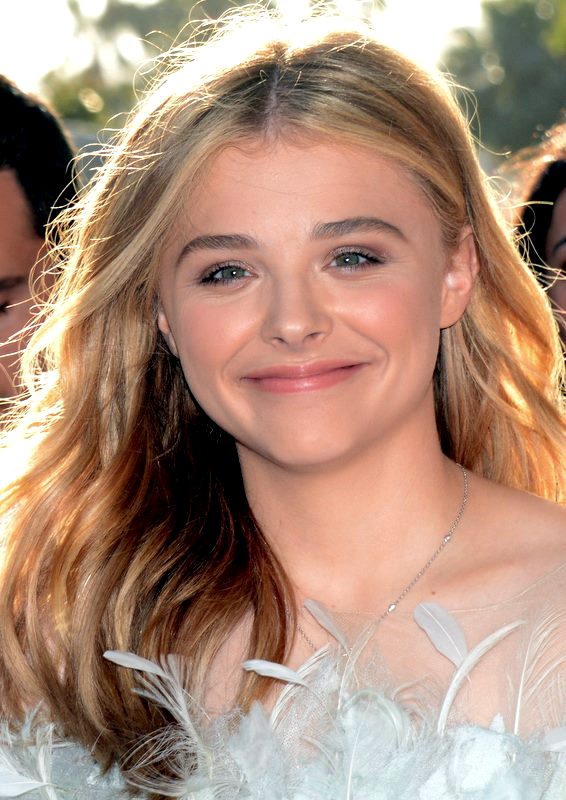
Chloë Grace Moretz received the Best Performance by a Younger Actor award for Carrie, her second win.

| Best Science Fiction Film | Best Fantasy Film |
|---|---|
| Gravity; Ender's Game; The Hunger Games: Catching Fire; Pacific Rim; Riddick; Star Trek Into Darkness | Her; About Time; The Hobbit: The Desolation of Smaug; Jack the Giant Slayer; Oz the Great and Powerful; The Secret Life of Walter Mitty |
| Best Horror Film | Best Thriller Film |
| The Conjuring; Carrie; Mama; The Purge; This Is the End; Warm Bodies | World War Z; Prisoners; The Call; The East; Now You See Me; The Place Beyond the Pines |
| Best Action or Adventure Film | Best International Film |
| Fast & Furious 6; The Book Thief; Jack Ryan: Shadow Recruit; The Lone Ranger; Lone Survivor; Rush | Big Bad Wolves; Blancanieves; A Hijacking; How I Live Now; Stoker; The World's End |
| Best Animated Film | Best Comic-to-Film Motion Picture |
| Frozen; Despicable Me 2; From Up on Poppy Hill; Monsters University | Iron Man 3; Man of Steel; Thor: The Dark World; The Wolverine |
| Best Director | Best Writing |
| Alfonso Cuarón – Gravity; J. J. Abrams – Star Trek Into Darkness; Peter Berg – Lone Survivor; Peter Jackson – The Hobbit: The Desolation of Smaug; Francis Lawrence – The Hunger Games: Catching Fire; Guillermo del Toro – Pacific Rim | Spike Jonze – Her; Fran Walsh, Philippa Boyens, Peter Jackson and Guillermo del Toro – The Hobbit: The Desolation of Smaug; Joel Coen and Ethan Coen – Inside Llewyn Davis; Alfonso Cuarón and Jonás Cuarón – Gravity; Jennifer Lee – Frozen; Edgar Wright and Simon Pegg – The World's End |
| Best Actor | Best Actress |
| Robert Downey Jr. – Iron Man 3 as Tony Stark / Iron Man; Oscar Isaac – Inside Llewyn Davis as Llewyn Davis; Simon Pegg – The World's End as Gary King; Joaquin Phoenix – Her as Theodore Twombley; Brad Pitt – World War Z as Gerry Lane; Ben Stiller – The Secret Life of Walter Mitty as Walter Mitty | Sandra Bullock – Gravity as Ryan Stone; Halle Berry – The Call as Jordan Turner; Martina Gedeck – The Wall as Die Frau; Jennifer Lawrence – The Hunger Games: Catching Fire as Katniss Everdeen; Emma Thompson – Saving Mr. Banks as P.L. Travers; Mia Wasikowska – Stoker as India Stoker |
| Best Supporting Actor | Best Supporting Actress |
| Ben Kingsley – Iron Man 3 as Trevor Slattery; Daniel Brühl – Rush as Niki Lauda; George Clooney – Gravity as Matt Kowalski; Benedict Cumberbatch – Star Trek Into Darkness as Khan Noonien Singh; Harrison Ford – Ender's Game as Hyrum Graff; Tom Hiddleston – Thor: The Dark World as Loki; Bill Nighy – About Time as James Lake | Scarlett Johansson – Her as Samantha; Nicole Kidman – Stoker as Evelyn Stoker; Melissa Leo – Prisoners as Holly Jones; Evangeline Lilly – The Hobbit: The Desolation of Smaug as Tauriel; Jena Malone – The Hunger Games: Catching Fire as Johanna Mason; Emily Watson – The Book Thief as Rosa Hubermann |
| Best Performance by a Younger Actor | Best Music |
| Chloë Grace Moretz – Carrie as Carrie White; Asa Butterfield – Ender's Game as Ender Wiggin; Sophie Nélisse – The Book Thief as Liesl Meminger; Saoirse Ronan – How I Live Now as Daisy; Ty Simpkins – Iron Man 3 as Harley Keener; Dylan Sprayberry – Man of Steel as Clark Kent / Superman | Frank Ilfman – Big Bad Wolves; Danny Elfman – Oz the Great and Powerful; Howard Shore – The Hobbit: The Desolation of Smaug; Brian Tyler – Iron Man 3; Brian Tyler – Now You See Me; John Williams – The Book Thief |
| Best Production Design | Best Editing |
| Dan Hennah – The Hobbit: The Desolation of Smaug; Philip Messina – The Hunger Games: Catching Fire; Andrew Neskoromny and Carol Spier – Pacific Rim; Andy Nicholson – Gravity; Jan Roelfs – 47 Ronin; Robert Stromberg – Oz the Great and Powerful | Alfonso Cuarón and Mark Sanger – Gravity; Peter Amundson and John Gilroy – Pacific Rim; Alan Edward Bell – The Hunger Games: Catching Fire; Mark Day – About Time; Daniel P. Hanley and Mike Hill – Rush; Christian Wagner, Kelly Matsumoto and Dylan Highsmith – Fast & Furious 6 |
| Best Costume | Best Make-up |
| Trish Summerville – The Hunger Games: Catching Fire; Gary Jones – Oz the Great and Powerful; Michael Kaplan – Star Trek Into Darkness; Wendy Partridge – Thor: The Dark World; Beatrix Aruna Pasztor – Great Expectations; Penny Rose – 47 Ronin | Donald Mowat – Prisoners; Patrick Baxter, Jane O'Kane and Roger Murray – Evil Dead; Peter King, Rick Findlater and Richard Taylor – The Hobbit: The Desolation of Smaug; Howard Berger, Janie Kelman and Peter Montagna – Lone Survivor; Fae Hammond, Mark Coulier and Kirstin Chalmers – Rush; Karen Cohen, David White and Elizabeth Yianni-Georgiou – Thor: The Dark World |
| Best Special Effects | Best Independent Film |
| Tim Webber, Chris Lawrence, David Shirk and Neil Corbould – Gravity; Joe Letteri, Eric Saindon, David Clayton and Eric Reynolds – The Hobbit: The Desolation of Smaug; Joe Letteri, John Desjardin and Dan Lemmon – Man of Steel; John Knoll, James E. Price, Clay Pinney and Rocco Larizza – Pacific Rim; Patrick Tubach, Ben Grossmann and Burt Dalton – Star Trek Into Darkness; Jake Morrison, Paul Corbould and Mark Breakspear – Thor: The Dark World | 12 Years a Slave; Great Expectations; Inside Llewyn Davis; The Invisible Woman; Out of the Furnace; Upside Down |

=== Television ===
==== Programs ====
| Best Network Television Series | Best Syndicated/Cable Television Series |
|---|---|
| Hannibal (NBC) (tie); Revolution (NBC) (tie); Agents of S.H.I.E.L.D. (ABC); The Blacklist (NBC); The Following (Fox); Sleepy Hollow (Fox); Under the Dome (CBS) | The Walking Dead (AMC); American Horror Story: Coven (FX); The Americans (FX); Continuum (Syfy); Dexter (Showtime); Haven (Syfy) |
| Best Television Presentation | Best Youth-Oriented Television Series |
| Breaking Bad (AMC); Bates Motel (A&E); Black Sails (Starz); Falling Skies (TNT); Game of Thrones (HBO); Vikings (History) | Teen Wolf (MTV); Arrow (The CW); Pretty Little Liars (ABC Family); Supernatural (The CW); The Tomorrow People (The CW); The Vampire Diaries (The CW) |

==== Acting ====
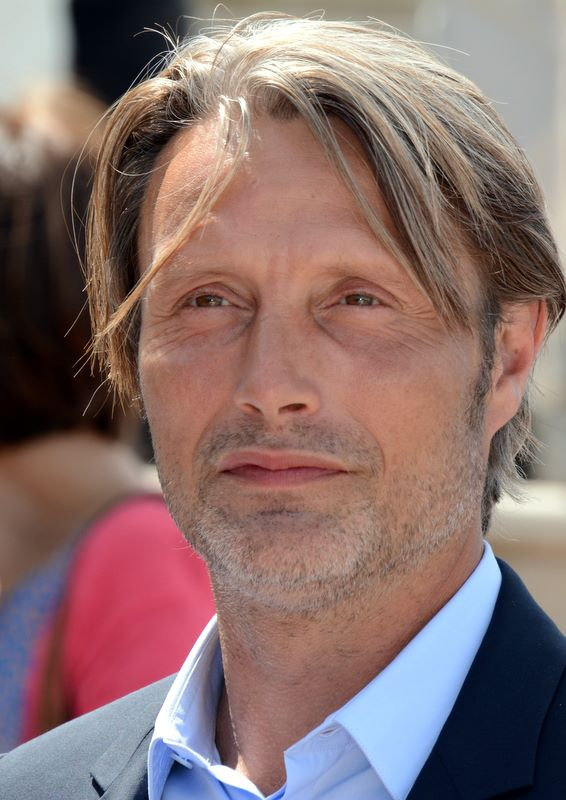
Mads Mikkelsen received the Best Actor on Television award for Hannibal.

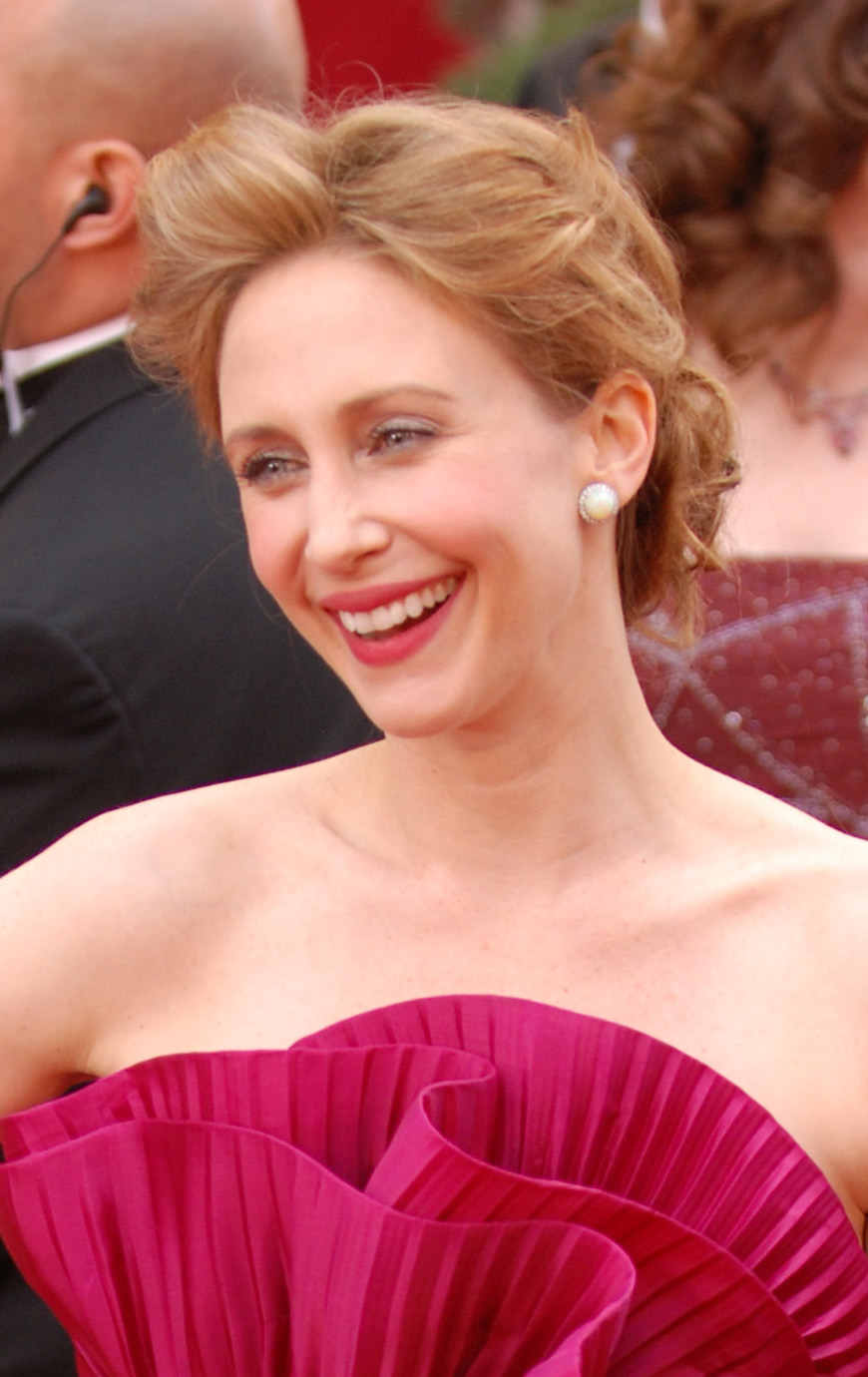
Vera Farmiga received the Best Actress on Television award for Bates Motel.

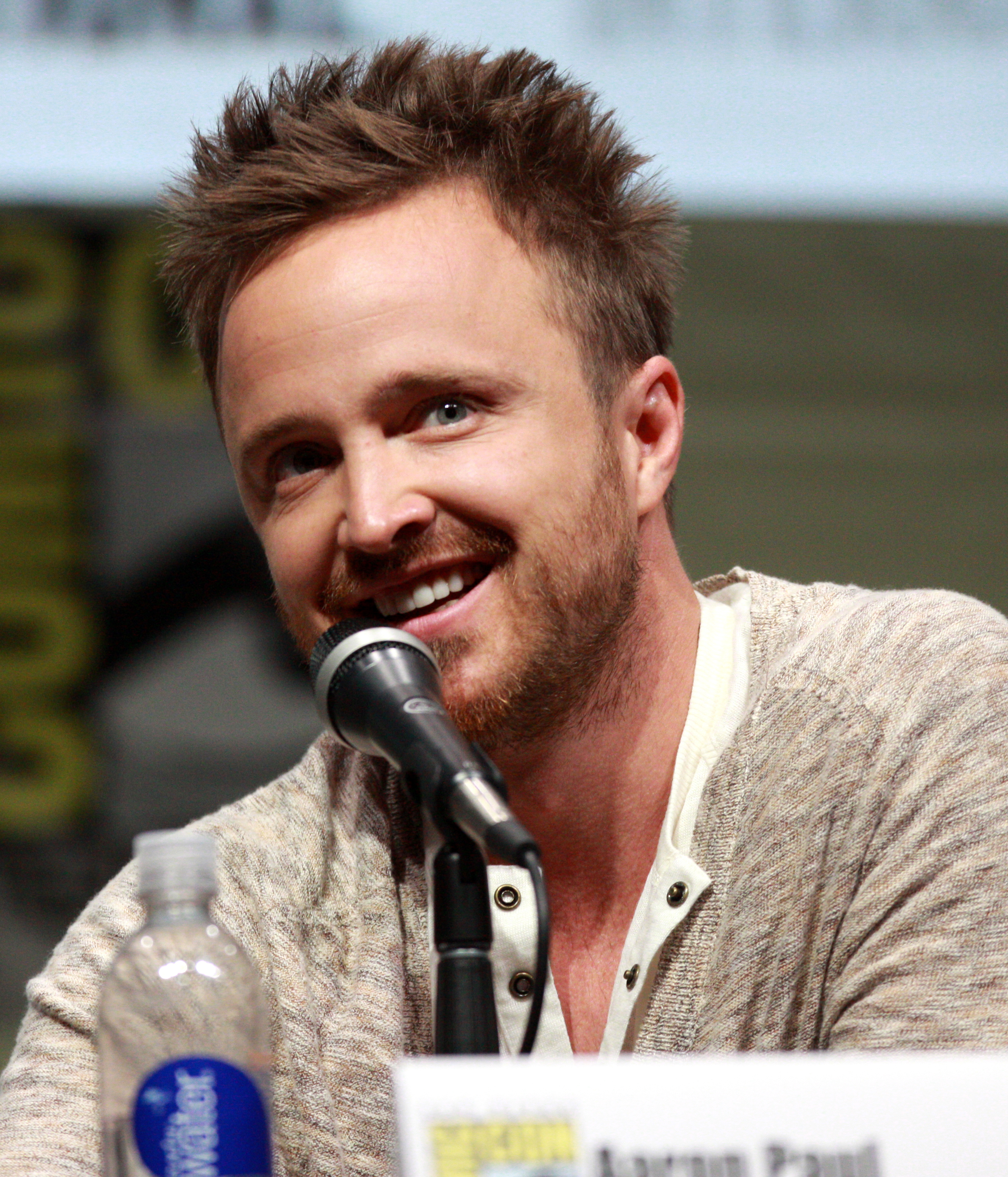
Aaron Paul received the Best Supporting Actor on Television award for Breaking Bad, his third win in four nominations.

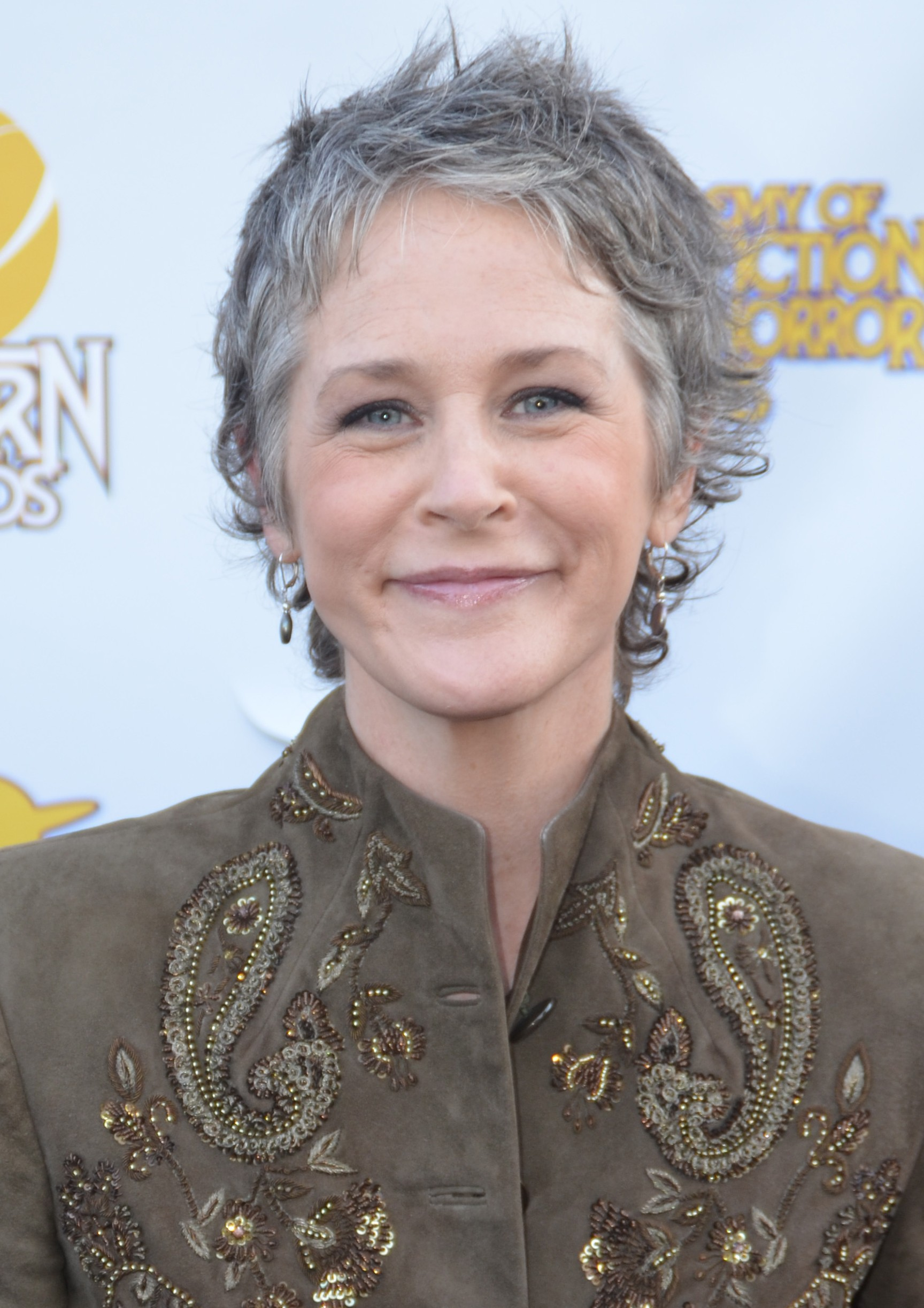
Melissa McBride received the Best Supporting Actress on Television award for The Walking Dead.

| Best Actor on Television | Best Actress on Television |
|---|---|
| Mads Mikkelsen – Hannibal (NBC) as Hannibal Lecter; Kevin Bacon – The Following (Fox) as Ryan Hardy; Bryan Cranston – Breaking Bad (AMC) as Walter White; Hugh Dancy – Hannibal (NBC) as Will Graham; Freddie Highmore – Bates Motel (A&E) as Norman Bates; James Spader – The Blacklist (NBC) as Raymond Reddington; Noah Wyle – Falling Skies (TNT) as Tom Mason | Vera Farmiga – Bates Motel (A&E) as Norma Bates; Jennifer Carpenter – Dexter (Showtime) as Debra Morgan; Anna Gunn – Breaking Bad (AMC) as Skyler White; Jessica Lange – American Horror Story: Coven (FX) as Fiona Goode; Rachel Nichols – Continuum (Syfy) as Kiera Cameron; Keri Russell – The Americans (FX) as Elizabeth Jennings |
| Best Supporting Actor on Television | Best Supporting Actress on Television |
| Aaron Paul – Breaking Bad (AMC) as Jesse Pinkman; Nikolaj Coster-Waldau – Game of Thrones (HBO) as Jaime Lannister; Erik Knudsen – Continuum (Syfy) as Alec Sadler; David Lyons – Revolution (NBC) as General Sebastian Monroe; Dean Norris – Under the Dome (CBS) as Big Jim Rennie; James Purefoy – The Following (Fox) as Joe Carroll | Melissa McBride – The Walking Dead (AMC) as Carol Peletier; Kathy Bates – American Horror Story: Coven (FX) as Delphine LaLaurie; Sarah Carter – Falling Skies (TNT) as Maggie; Gwendoline Christie – Game of Thrones (HBO) as Brienne of Tarth; Michelle Fairley – Game of Thrones (HBO) as Catelyn Stark; Elizabeth Mitchell – Revolution (NBC) as Rachel Matheson |
| Best Guest Star on Television | Best Performance by a Younger Actor in a Television Series |
| Robert Forster – Breaking Bad (AMC) as Ed; Stephen Collins – Falling Skies (TNT) as President Hathaway; Danny Huston – American Horror Story: Coven (FX) as The Axeman; David Morrissey – The Walking Dead (AMC) as Governor; Charlotte Rampling – Dexter (Showtime) as Dr. Evelyn Vogel; Gina Torres – Hannibal (NBC) as Bella Crawford | Chandler Riggs – The Walking Dead (AMC) as Carl Grimes; Colin Ford – Under the Dome (CBS) as Joe McAlister; Jared S. Gilmore – Once Upon a Time (ABC) as Henry Mills; Jack Gleeson – Game of Thrones (HBO) as Joffrey Baratheon; Connor Jessup – Falling Skies (TNT) as Ben Mason; Mackenzie Lintz – Under the Dome (CBS) as Norrie Calvert-Hill |

=== Home video ===
| Best DVD or Blu-ray Release | Best DVD or Blu-ray Collection |
|---|---|
| Big Ass Spider!; The Brass Teapot; Curse of Chucky; Mischief Night; Solomon Kane; Twixt; You're Next | Chucky: The Complete Collection; The Bowery Boys Collection: Volumes 2 and 3; Friday the 13th: The Complete Collection; James Dean Ultimate Collector's Collection; Mad Max Trilogy; Zatoichi the Blind Swordsman |
| Best Classic Film Release | Best DVD or Blu-ray TV Series |
| Halloween 35th Anniversary Edition; Fantastic Voyage; The Haunting; House of Wax; Nosferatu; The Wicker Man | Star Trek: The Next Generation: Seasons 3, 4 and 5; The Adventures of Superboy: The Complete Third Season; Search: The Complete Series; Under the Dome: Season One; The Walking Dead: The Complete Third Season; The White Queen: Season One |

== Multiple awards and nominations ==
Film

| Awards | Nominations | Film |
|---|---|---|
| 5 | 8 | Gravity |
| 3 | 4 | Her |
| 3 | 5 | Iron Man 3 |
| 2 | 2 | Big Bad Wolves |

Television

| Awards | Nominations | Series |
|---|---|---|
| 3 | 5 | Breaking Bad |
| 3 | 4 | The Walking Dead |
| 2 | 4 | Hannibal |
