= The Fourth Hand (Under the Dome) =

- Under the Dome episode
- Episode no.: Season 1 Episode 9
- Directed by: Roxann Dawson
- Written by: Daniel Truly
- Original air date: August 19, 2013

Guest appearances
- Natalie Zea as Maxine; Raheen Babalola as Ted; Evan Gamble as Larry; Ray Stoney as Dres Johnson

Episode chronology
← Previous "Thicker Than Water"	Next → "Let the Games Begin"
- Under the Dome (season 1)

"The Fourth Hand" is the ninth episode of the first season of the CBS drama Under the Dome. The episode aired on August 19, 2013.

Commentators gave the episode mixed reviews, though most applauded Natalie Zea's role as Maxine. Upon airing, the episode was watched by 10.64 million viewers, and received an 18-49 rating of 2.4.

== Plot ==
Julia (Rachelle Lefevre) takes Barbie (Mike Vogel) to see the mini-dome and the egg, but they have both disappeared. Barbie then leaves to help Linda (Natalie Martinez) break up some fights, where they find a highly strung out drug addict who is undergoing withdrawal symptoms from Rapture, a drug that he had purchased from Reverend Coggins (Ned Bellamy). A thorough search by Linda and Barbie uncovers drug making equipment in one of Reverend Coggin's coffins.

Big Jim receives an unexpected visitor – Maxine (Natalie Zea), a business partner who created Rapture. She was trapped under the dome because she had decided to pay Big Jim a visit on the day the dome fell over Chester's Mill. Big Jim suggests to Linda that they encourage the town's residents to voluntarily hand in their weapons, so as to protect everybody's safety. Linda and Barbie are skeptical of Big Jim's intentions, but decide to go along with his idea to keep everybody safe. While the guns are getting collected, a local named Ted (Raheen Babalola) begins to concern Big Jim. He and Barbie follow him to his house, with Barbie waiting outside with a sniper rifle while Big Jim goes in the house. Big Jim finds Ted in his room, where he reveals a grenade, saying that he can't live after the dome killed his family. Big Jim then grabs the grenade and puts the pin back into it. He takes Ted away from the house, and tells Barbie he knows that he was aiming for him with the sniper.

Big Jim and Maxine later meet up with the guns, with Barbie walking in and Maxine kissing him. Maxine then reveals that she knows all about both their secrets and will expose them if they try to stop her from doing what she wants. It is then revealed that she requested having the guns gathered. Later that night, Junior (Alexander Koch) finds the shelter at the house open, and sees Big Jim organizing a number of guns and the grenade from earlier in one of the rooms.

Angie (Britt Robertson) takes over the diner, and asks Big Jim to put her name on the diner's deed. Big Jim promises to think about it. Junior pays a visit to Angie at the diner and she goes into a seizure, repeating the phrase, "The pink stars are falling." Junior brings Angie back home, where she finds out that she had the same seizure as Joe (Colin Ford) and Norrie (Mackenzie Lintz). Norrie notices Angie's butterfly tattoo and wonders if she is the "monarch who will be crowned." Norrie suggests using the yagee, an invention by Dodee (Jolene Purdy) to find the missing mini-dome. Julia tries to borrow it from Dodee but she says that the yagee isn't working anymore because Joe and Norrie touched the dome together. Joe, Norrie, and Angie later find the dome in the barn, with Angie saying that she saw Joe sleepwalking, and they assume that he brought it to the barn. The three of them then touch the dome at the same time. Once doing so, the egg in the middle of the dome lights up, revealing a fourth handprint, indicating that the dome needs a fourth hand.

== Reception ==
=== Ratings ===
The episode was watched by 10.64 million American viewers, and received an 18-49 rating/share of 2.4/7, placing first in its timeslot and the night.

=== Critical reception ===
In regards to the episode's plot, Ashley Knierim of The Huffington Post said "The season is winding down, but CBS is still throwing every possible scenario our way. It's been a very busy eight days in Chester's Mill, and Monday's episode just adds to the crazy."

Andrea Reiher of Zap2it commented on Natalie Zea's portrayal as Maxine, saying "We'll confess that we had guessed Maxine was the person to whom Barbie was speaking on the phone from the pilot, but we did not expect her to be so bold as to kiss him in front of Big Jim. It's nice to be surprised...Maxine's vision for Chester's Mill is certainly an interesting left turn from the book. We love the idea of a wild frontier town-type thing happening, but we wonder how long that can carry on inside the dome? Is it a temporary thing? Or is Maxine a big bad who is here to stay a while?" Darren Franich of Entertainment Weekly also commented positively on Natalie Zea's character, saying "Max immediately added a whole lot of plot momentum to the show. She convinced Big Jim to round up all the guns so that they/she could be in control. She also revealed that she knew Barbie by giving him a very memorable smooch, and promised to tell Julia about the whole whoops-I-killed-your-husband thing...So basically, Max has only been on the show for an episode, and already she’s A) the most powerful enemy for Big Jim we’ve ever met B) the third corner of a Barbie/Julia romantic triangle, and C) established that she knows all the secrets of everyone in town. More of her, please!"

Ted Kindig of BuddyTV gave the episode a positive review, saying "It's a relatively interesting evening under the dome this week, particularly as the show alternately explores Big Jim's sketchy past in illegal drug manufacturing and his present effort to reduce gun violence -- the former is a bit obvious at this point, but at least the story's moving now; the latter is most interesting on a meta level for its obliviously apolitical take on a hot-button issue, like an abortion-themed episode that politely acknowledges Roe vs. Wade but never engages with it. Quibbles aside, I'll take a plot line that's interesting either in spite of or because of its faults over the silly pink star monarch gobbledygook any day."

Tim Surette of TV.com wrote negatively about the episode, saying "Since "The Fourth Hand" had such a huge to-do list, it sped along at lightning speed, hitting so many different micro-plots that it never spent enough time with any of them. A month ago Under the Dome would have devoted an entire episode to the arrival of a new drug in town, or tearing up the Second Amendment, or the search for the mini-dome, but in "The Fourth Hand" these stories were all crushed together into visual bullet points and we were the bloody mess left behind."
