= Thicker Than Water (Under the Dome) =

- Under the Dome episode
- Episode no.: Season 1 Episode 8
- Directed by: Jack Bender
- Written by: Adam Stein
- Original air date: August 12, 2013

Guest appearances
- Andrew Vogel as Carter; Michael Tourek as Wendell; Jimmy Gonzales as Volunteer

Episode chronology
← Previous "Imperfect Circles"	Next → "The Fourth Hand"
- Under the Dome (season 1)

"Thicker Than Water" is the eighth episode of the first season of the CBS drama Under the Dome. The episode aired on August 12, 2013.

== Plot ==
At night, Junior (Alexander Koch) comes home but Big Jim (Dean Norris) points a gun at him and tells him to leave. The next morning, Big Jim confronts Ollie (Leon Rippy) and gets Barbie (Mike Vogel), Linda (Natalie Martinez), Junior and a volunteer (Jimmy Gonzalez) to take the well from Ollie. However, when they arrive, a number of Ollie's men with guns appear and shoot the volunteer in the leg. Junior then betrays his father and joins Ollie's side. While Jim is rounding up volunteers to attack Ollie's farm, Barbie and Linda plan to blow the well up so that the other wells' water is returned. Barbie tries to get Big Jim's approval, but he refuses.

Meanwhile, Norrie (Mackenzie Lintz) blames Joe (Colin Ford) for finding the mini-dome and breaks up with him. Joe then tells Julia (Rachelle Lefevre) about the mini-dome and the egg, and they both go to see it. When they arrive the egg is glowing pink. Julia touches the dome and another Joe appears, saying, "the monarch will be crowned." Joe thinks this means that something bad will happen to him.

Junior finds out from Ollie that the car crash in which his mother died was not an accident but a suicide. Junior then asks Ollie not to kill Jim, because he wants to. Before Big Jim and the volunteers attack, Barbie sneaks into Ollie's farm, builds a bomb and attaches it to the well. At night, Big Jim, Linda, Phil (Nicholas Strong), and others attack the farm. Jim then realizes that Barbie is missing and attacks early. During the battle, five people are killed, and Phil is shot in the shoulder. Just before he detonates the bomb, Barbie is caught, but manages to overcome his attacker and destroys the well. As everyone realizes that the well has been destroyed, Junior appears and knocks out Jim with his gun.

Angie (Britt Robertson) and Norrie bond, and she talks Norrie into getting back together with Joe. Norrie then tells Joe that she is ready to bury her mother, Alice (Samantha Mathis), who died in the previous episode.

Big Jim is dragged into Ollie's living room and Ollie's men leave now that there is no well to protect. Ollie leaves Junior to kill Big Jim but instead he asks Jim about his mother. Ollie returns and aims his gun at Jim, but Junior shoots and kills Ollie. Big Jim and Junior then reconcile but part ways. Big Jim is later confronted by Barbie, with Barbie saying how fewer people could have died had they gone with his plan. At the police station, Linda is surprised to see Junior, who tells her what happened and that the cell is his home. At Julia's house, Julia asks Barbie if he knows what the other Joe meant but he says no while Angie's tattoo of a butterfly on her shoulder is seen.

== Production ==
Executive producer Neal Baer said with TV Guide regarding Big Jim and the events of the previous episode that "Boomer and Ollie were preventing the town from getting access to water, so was Big Jim being evil or was he doing this to save the town? That's always the wonderful part about Big Jim — that it's not like he gets off on killing people, but the only people he's killed have threatened Chester's Mill. Ollie was going to keep everyone from getting water and we'll get into that next week in a big way."

== Reception ==
=== Ratings ===
The episode was watched by 10.36 million American viewers and received an 18-49 rating/share of 2.4/7, which was at the time the lowest rated episode of the series. The show placed first for the timeslot, with Siberia placing second in the same timeslot, and first for the night.

=== Critical reception ===
Ted Kindig of BuddyTV gave the episode a negative review, but also commented on Dean Norris's success, saying "We're all remembering what Norris can do with a good script and an assured authorial vision. We're engaging with stories that don't rely on mumbo-jumbo mystery phrases to build suspense. And while I'm not entirely proud to open this recap with a hacky, predictable bait-and-switch, Under the Dome isn't the least bit ashamed to end on one." Andrea Reiher of Zap2it said despite the ending with Angie gazing at Jim and Norrie being "creepy," she then said "It's also interesting to watch Big Jim and Junior be so separated, since in the book they are definitely partners in crime. Is the show on its way there?"
