= The Fire (Under the Dome) =

- Under the Dome episode
- Episode no.: Season 1 Episode 2
- Directed by: Jack Bender
- Written by: Rick Cleveland
- Original air date: July 1, 2013

Episode chronology
← Previous "Pilot"	Next → "Manhunt"
- Under the Dome (season 1)

"The Fire" is the second episode of the first season of the CBS drama Under the Dome. The episode aired on July 1, 2013.

== Plot ==
Linda tries to keep her emotions intact following Duke's death, after discovering he has left her everything in his will, including his house and savings. Elsewhere, Barbie realizes he left his dog tags at the cabin where he killed Julia's husband Peter, and heads back to retrieve them, but is ambushed by Junior who continues to believe Angie is sexually involved with him.

At the radio station, Dodee (Jolene Purdy) and Phil (Nicholas Strong) pick up a military frequency, and overhear them discussing the 'dome'. Julia, on a hunt for some answers, commandeers the microphone to broadcast the information. While exploring, Joe and his friend Ben notice that a small part of a stream of water (a hose operated by the military) escapes through the dome.

Meanwhile, Big Jim (Dean Norris) has Reverend Coggins (Ned Bellamy) destroy the propane shipment records at Sheriff Duke's house, but Coggins accidentally starts a large fire while burning the evidence. Linda hears Coggins yell for help and pulls him out of the house, but the fire spreads when a nearby propane tank explodes, forcing the town to rally together to form a bucket brigade. Though Big Jim had ignored Coggins’ cries for help before anyone arrived on the scene, in front of the town he uses a tractor to contain the fire. The fire is later successfully put out, with the town rejoicing in their efforts to stay strong.

Moments later however, a hysterical Deputy Paul (Kevin Sizemore) shoots his gun at the dome, but the bullet ricochets off it and hits Deputy Freddy (Joe Knezevich), killing him.

== Reception ==
=== Ratings ===
The episode was watched by 11.81 million American viewers with an 18–49 rating/share of 2.9/8. This is down from the pilot episode, but placed first for the night as the most watched and highest rated show.

=== Critical reception ===
The episode received mixed to negative reviews from critics. Matt Fowler of IGN gave the episode a mixed to negative review, commenting on the lack of character build, saying, "Everything character-wise, at this point, is mostly surface level – with everyone pretty much just acting out in panic mode and very little room to go into their back-stories any further. Lost solved this (and I'll try not to keep bringing up Lost) with really well-crafted flashbacks, and although character flashbacks have been done to death on Lost-esque shows (or at least J. J. Abrams produced ones) since then, I feel like some of these folks would benefit from them." Tim Surrette of TV.com gave the episode a negative review, saying, "[The] pilot was entertaining, but it did show signs that it wasn't the start of a great series. Junior's kidnapping of Angie, the episode's stress on non-dome side stories, and broadly painted characters really dragged down the second half of the premiere after a pretty solid start."

Darren Franich of Entertainment Weekly gave the episode a mixed to positive review, saying, "This was a solid and world-buildy second outing for Under the Dome. The episode mostly served to further establish the boundaries of the New Dome Order; not much happened until the end, but it seems like the final act will have serious reverberations throughout the town."

Andrea Reiher of Zap2it acknowledged the changes from the book and episode, specifically Big Jim's storyline, saying, "Big Jim's true nature (true-true nature) is seemingly on a much slow burn for the series. In the book, Big Jim goes from wannabe BMOC to psychopath in fairly short order. The series seems to be making the character more multi-faceted and certainly not as scarily evil as the Rennie of the book. It makes sense—the show wants to be on for more than one summer (and it will be, if the ratings continue like they were for the premiere), so the writers can't blow it too early with having Big Jim go from zero to sixty in three episodes. But the slowed down evolution of Big Jim might also bring a lot more sympathy to the character, a change we think could be interesting to watch."
