= Blue on Blue (Under the Dome) =

- Under the Dome episode
- Episode no.: Season 1 Episode 5
- Directed by: Jack Bender
- Written by: Brian K. Vaughan
- Original air date: July 22, 2013

Guest appearances
- Andrew Vogel as Carter; Al Vicente as Dell; Arianne Martin as Georgia; Josh Carter as Rusty; Ellen Rice as Dodee's mother; Gary Weeks as Norrie's dad; Jeff Glor as himself; Rahsheem Shabazz as young soldier; Chip Lane as Joe's dad; Julie Kendall as Joe's mom; Ed Ricker as Andrea's son; Nick Madrick as Bullhorn soldier

Episode chronology
← Previous "Outbreak"	Next → "The Endless Thirst"
- Under the Dome (season 1)

"Blue on Blue" is the fifth episode of the CBS drama Under the Dome. The episode aired on July 22, 2013. It was after this episode that the series was renewed for a second season on July 29, 2013.

The episode was screened at the 2013 Comic-Con, and was received positively by viewers; and was also well received by most critics. Upon airing, the episode was watched by 11.60 million viewers, with an 18-49 rating of 2.8, presenting an increase in ratings from the previous episode.

== Plot ==
Despite finding Angie in the shelter, Jim leaves her locked up, unable to believe his son would do such a thing. Meanwhile, the military has scheduled a "visitors' day" for the residents of Chester's Mill, where family members and friends of people trapped in the dome can come and visit their loved ones. During the event, Linda tells her fiancé about his brother's death, Norrie meets her estranged biological father (Gary Weeks), who her parents had led her to believe she would never be able to find, and Barbie finds out from a soldier stationed outside the dome that the military plans to attempt to destroy the dome with a missile (MOAB), which will likely kill everyone inside. When Barbie relays this to Big Jim, he orders everyone to take shelter in the tunnels underneath the city. He then releases Angie from her captivity, but when Junior finds out, he sets off after her while everyone else takes shelter in the tunnels.

As most of the town prepares for the inevitable in the tunnels, Joe and Norrie search for Angie, Junior finds Angie at her house and they spend what they believe will be their last moments together, and Barbie and Julia search for Norrie at the request of her parents. As the missile approaches, Norrie and Joe share a kiss.

The missile harmlessly impacts the dome, laying waste to everything outside of it but leaving the town unscathed. Norrie and Joe find that they no longer have seizures when they touch. As Big Jim investigates the edge of the dome, he is approached by Reverend Coggins, who earlier gave him an ultimatum to admit his part in a drug scandal to the town. Jim kills Coggins by pressing his head against the dome, causing his hearing aid to explode.

== Production ==
American journalist Jeff Glor played himself in this episode. Brian K. Vaughan teased the plot of the episode via an interview with The Hollywood Reporter, saying "I don't want to spoil too much about the military's plan, but I can say next week's episode begins with a "visitors' day." It's finally a chance for the people trapped inside Chester's Mill, inside the dome, to talk with not just their loved ones but the rest of the free world—what's going on, to get more information about this, if there are any more domes around the world. So far, they've been entirely cut off from the world, but now they'll start getting big answers."

Dean Norris said in an interview with Zap2it regarding the dome "there's a lot more understanding of what it is, and that's part of the story that also starts really picking up in [episode 5], and really accelerates through to the end of the season, where the dome becomes a real character and the kids actually start to understand it."

== Reception ==
=== Ratings ===
The episode saw a rise in viewership and ratings from the previous episode, as it was watched by 11.60 million viewers and received an adults 18-49 rating/share of 2.8/8. The show placed first in its timeslot and placed first for the night.

=== Critical reception ===
The episode was screened at the 2013 Comic-Con, and was received positively by viewers.

Andrea Reiher of Zap2it commented positively on the episode's final moments before the bomb hit the dome, saying "The montage of everyone preparing for their final moments actually had us tearing up a bit, especially Deputy Linda going to the spot where she and her husband carved their initials. Also Dodee and Phil dancing."
