= Pilot (Under the Dome) =

- Under the Dome episode
- Episode no.: Season 1 Episode 1
- Directed by: Niels Arden Oplev
- Written by: Brian K. Vaughan
- Production code: 101
- Original air date: June 24, 2013

Episode chronology
← Previous —	Next → "The Fire"
- Under the Dome (season 1)

"Pilot" is the pilot episode of the American science fiction drama Under the Dome, based on the novel of the same name by author Stephen King. It originally aired on CBS in the United States on June 24, 2013.

The premiere episode was met with generally positive reviews from critics; and was watched by 13.53 million American viewers, setting numerous records for CBS.

== Plot ==
Dale "Barbie" Barbara (Mike Vogel) buries a man's body in the woods of Chester's Mill. As he tries to escape the town, a mysterious, invisible barrier descends on the borders of the township, trapping everyone inside.

Local newspaper reporter Julia Shumway (Rachelle Lefevre), who was investigating mysterious propane deliveries before the barrier appeared, takes a special interest in Barbie after he saves the life of teenager Joe McAlister (Colin Ford), whose parents are trapped out of town. Town selectman "Big Jim" Rennie (Dean Norris) makes an emergency radio announcement, while police chief Duke Perkins (Jeff Fahey) and his deputy Linda Esquivel (Natalie Martinez) try to quell the rise of panic in the town. Big Jim's unstable son Junior (Alexander Koch) kidnaps Angie McAlister (Britt Robertson) when he begins to suspect she had an affair with Barbie.

Carolyn Hill (Aisha Hinds) and her partner Alice Calvert (Samantha Mathis) are passing through Chester's Mill when the barrier appears and their daughter Norrie (Mackenzie Lintz) has what they think is a diabetic seizure, and starts repeatedly saying that she can see pink stars falling in lines.

A link between Big Jim, Duke and the stockpiled propane is revealed. Julia takes Barbie into her home, where he realizes the man he murdered and buried is her husband, Peter (R. Keith Harris). Duke suggests to Linda that the entire town is being punished and is about to reveal a dark secret about the town when his pacemaker explodes as he approaches the barrier. The U.S. military descends upon Chester's Mill as the world learns of the unprecedented phenomenon.

== Production ==
It was announced in November 2012 that CBS had bypassed ordering a pilot and given Under the Dome a thirteen-episode straight-to-series commitment. "This is a great novel coming to the television screen with outstanding auspices and in-season production values to create a summer programming event," commented Nina Tassler in the official CBS press release. Filming for the series officially began in Southport, North Carolina, and Wilmington, North Carolina, on February 28, 2013.

One house in Wilmington used during filming was also used in the drama series One Tree Hill.

== Reception ==
=== Ratings ===
The episode was watched by 13.53 million American viewers, with an 18–49 rating/share of 3.3/9. The show placed first in its timeslot and tied for first for the night against Game 6 of the 2013 Stanley Cup Finals. The episode had CBS's biggest summer premiere since Big Brother debuted in 2000, the biggest summer drama premiere since the 1992 series 2000 Malibu Road, and the biggest primetime drama premiere since The Following. The premiere also beat the third-season premiere of Hawaii Five-0 in its timeslot, which garnered a 1.8 rating, and beat the most recent CBS-aired premiere of the CTV drama Flashpoint, which received a 1.9 rating. The episode ranked first for the week with viewers and adults 18–49, with America's Got Talent trailing behind.

Via DVR numbers, this added 3.16 million viewers, the episode was watched by a total of 16.69 million viewers with an 18–49 rating of 4.3. Live + 7 numbers also brought the total viewership to 17.76 million viewers. Through other entertainment providers, the premiere has reached 19.85 million viewers.

In Canada, the episode was watched by 2.085 million viewers opposite the 2013 Stanley Cup Finals, and was watched by 904,000 viewers ages 18–49. The show ranked second for the week.

=== Critical reception ===
The premiere received generally positive reviews from critics. Robert Bianco of USA Today acknowledged the differences between the show and King's novel, saying, "It only seems fair to point out from the Dome outset that King's TV track record is particularly dismal." He then reviewed the show positively, saying, "if tonight's entertaining, intriguing premiere turns out to be a fair guide, Dome could be just what we've needed." Andrea Reiher of Zap2it reacted positively to the episode while looking at the perspective of both the book and show, saying, "We've read the book several times, and, as fans of the book, we enjoyed the premiere episode. It captures the spirit of the book while still making enough changes to have us invested in the storylines of the series because we don't know exactly what's going to happen." Darren Franich of Entertainment Weekly gave the episode a positive review, saying, "I was a big fan of Stephen King's book, and it's clear that the TV version is already striking off on its own distinctive path while retaining much of its inspiration's DNA."

Matt Fowler of IGN gave the episode a mixed to positive review, saying, "There's also the problem of having an awesome gimmick or premise that doesn't really come with a satisfying ending or answer. Because that happens too. In fact, Lost springs to mind." He then expressed his thoughts on the introduction of a large ensemble cast, saying, "It's a hard balance, of course, to introduce us to a large ensemble in a pilot episode, especially on a show like this where you also don't want to take too much away from the big event that's going down. But as we've seen with other sci-fi shows in the past, strange and annoying characters who, for whatever reason, aren't reacting to the big, world-changing event like everyone else become almost instantly un-watchable." He concludes by saying: "I'd say, for those looking for the closest thing to a Lost-surrogate, Under the Dome is your play. It's smartly done paranoia." Rob Sheffield of Rolling Stone also compared the series to Lost, saying "[the series] has both grand narrative scope and the small-bore detail that networks haven't succeeded with since Lost ended. And while the imprimatur of executive producer Steven Spielberg might not be a guarantee (remember Terra Nova?), the production is self-consciously movielike, even opening with a shot swiped straight from Kubrick's 2001."

Mary McNamara of the Los Angeles Times gave the episode a mixed review, saying, "For a story of such wide and possibly allegorical ambitions, the pilot seems in an unnecessary rush to get the party started." She did, however, applaud the character performances, calling them "promising".
