= The Endless Thirst =

- Under the Dome episode
- Episode no.: Season 1 Episode 6
- Directed by: Kari Skogland
- Written by: Soo Hugh
- Original air date: July 29, 2013

Guest appearances
- Crystal Martinez as Nurse Adams; Andrew Vogel as Carter; Jaret Sears as Clint Dundee; Linds Edwards as Waylon Dundee; Ray Stoney as Dres Johnson; Dale Raoul as Andrea Grinnell; Lucia Forte as Ida Turlow; Kelley Davis as Kay Fannon; Zach Hanner as Food mart manager; Michael Brady as Ray Garcia; Tony Schnur as Terry; Luke Donaldson as Scotty Fannon

Episode chronology
| ← Previous "Blue on Blue" | Next → "Imperfect Circles" |
- Under the Dome (season 1)

"The Endless Thirst" is the sixth episode of the first season of the CBS drama Under the Dome. The episode aired on July 29, 2013.

== Plot ==
After the town's water tower is accidentally destroyed and the lake is found to be polluted, Barbie helps Linda stop the looting that breaks out in response to the waning resources. Angie tells Rose (Beth Broderick) about her captivity by Junior and asks for her help, but they are accosted by the Dundee brothers who loot the diner, killing Rose and knocking Angie unconscious. Barbie intervenes to rescue Angie and a miraculous rainstorm occurs and ends the chaos. Big Jim trades with Ollie Dinsmore (Leon Rippy) for the town's use of Ollie's well in exchange for propane.

After Julia and Dodee speculate that the source of the radio signal jam could be the answer to the dome's origin, Dodee fashions a radio direction finding device that leads them to Joe and Norrie, who are on a search to find insulin to save Alice. The teenagers shock Julia and Dodee when they show them the video of their simultaneous seizure and end the signal jam by touching the dome together. Julia convinces Dodee to keep what they saw a secret in order to protect the children. Angie wakes up in Big Jim's home. Big Jim offers Angie protection for her and Joe as long as she keeps her imprisonment by Junior a secret. They are interrupted when Junior walks in, surprised to see Angie there.

== Reception ==
=== Ratings ===
The episode aired on July 29, 2013, and was watched by 11.41 million American viewers, and receiving an adults 18-49 rating/share of 2.8/8, matching the previous episode's rating, and placing first in its timeslot.

=== Critical reception ===
The episode was received moderately from most critics. Andrea Reiher of Zap2it gave the episode a mixed review, especially regarding the rain scene. She said "the rain starting was a little cheesy. It's fine that the dome is a "micro-climate," as Dodee calls it, but the moment it happened was a little clichéd. We're also not really ready for Julia and Barbie to be hooking up. We get it—intense circumstances, husband appears to be a philandering creep, etc. etc. But it still feels awfully quick." She did compliment the episode's "Lost island feel going on," saying "[it] opens up lots of interesting ideas about the origin of the dome. We already knew it was going to veer away from the book's explanation and we actually prefer this to the book ending, even if we don't know exactly what the show explanation is yet."

Matt Fowler of IGN gave the episode an 8.0 out of 10, saying "Sure, this episode involved yet another accident, and the mystical rainy resolution managed to squash things just as they were about to get interesting - with Linda pulling her gun, about to put down, or threaten to put down a citizen - but it all still crackled nicely and showed us just how ill-prepared the town's law brigade was for an uprising of any kind."

Scott Von Doviak of The A.V. Club gave the episode a B rating, giving it a moderate review, saying "[The] middle part of the episode is the closest Under The Dome has come to matching King’s vision of Chester’s Mill: It’s all tight-knit and neighborly until the shit hits the fan, and then it’s every man for himself. Of course, a handful of people are still trying to do the right thing, including Julia and Dodee, who set out to find the source of a signal that’s jamming all radio frequencies, only to find it’s Joe and Norrie. And since there’s no way the show can maintain this ratcheting up of intensity, there’s a convenient deus ex machina that solves all the episode’s problems: a rainstorm inside the dome..."The Endless Thirst" is a decent episode, but not necessarily an encouraging one. I expect we'll soon be finding out about a miracle source of food inside the dome, as well as an endlessly regenerating electric power grid and a secret sub-basement in the hospital full of non-expiring medications. Les Moonves has spoken, and the message is clear: This is television."

Ted Kindig of BuddyTV gave the episode a negative review, saying "This week's episode, in which the people of Chester's Mill finally graduate from static grumpiness to an all-out riot, once again establishes a major threat and improbably wipes it out without a trace by the end of the hour. The characters are once again bound by insane plot conveniences rather than believable motivations, and the questions that arise from new information about the dome are still a long way from justifying all the dumb stuff that keeps happening."
