= Megan Ketch =

American actress

- Education: New York University
- Occupation: Actress
- Years active: 2006–present

Megan Ketch is an American actress, best known for her roles on film such as the 2013 romantic comedy movie The Big Wedding and the mystery television series American Gothic.

== Life and career ==
Ketch graduated from New York University and in March 2012 was cast in a lead role on the ABC drama pilot Gotham. Later in 2012 she appeared in a recurring role on the CBS series Blue Bloods as Detective Kate Lansing. Her other television credits include A Gifted Man, Law & Order: Special Victims Unit, and The Good Wife. She made her feature film debut in the 2013 comedy The Big Wedding.

From 2015 to 2016, Ketch had a recurring role in the CW comedy series Jane the Virgin. In 2016, she went on to star in the CBS murder mystery summer drama series American Gothic.

== Filmography ==
=== Film ===
Year	Title	Role	Notes
2006	Settle Down Easy	Jana	Short film
2011	Crystal Sessions	Lilly Moore Granzen	Short film
2012	Bright Morning	Julie	Short film
2013	The Big Wedding	Jane	
2015	Louder Than Bombs	Amy	
2016	Cohab	Caye	Short film
2017	The Incredible Jessica James	Mandy	

=== Television ===
Year	Title	Role	Notes
2011	A Gifted Man	Julia	Episode: "In Case of Abnormal Rhythm"
2012	Gotham	Anne Travers	Unsold TV pilot
2012	Law & Order: Special Victims Unit	Corey Green	Episode: "Official Story"
2012–2013	Blue Bloods	Detective Kate Lansing	Recurring role, 6 episodes
2013–2015	The Good Wife	Deena Lampard	4 episodes
2013–2015	Under the Dome	Harriet Arnold	4 episodes
2014	Reckless	Shelby Rayder	Episodes: "Family Plot", "Civil Wars: Part 1"
2015	Forever	Irene	Episode: "Social Engineering"
2015–2016	Jane the Virgin	Susanna Barnett/Sin Rostro	Recurring role, 12 episodes
2016	American Gothic	Tessa Hawthorne	Main role
2018	Tremors	Mindy	Unsold TV pilot
2018–2019	The Affair	Gaelle	2 episodes
2020	Evil	Judy James	Episode: "Room 320" 2025
2025	Monster: The Ed Gein Story	Dr. Ann Burgess	
2025	Chad Powers	Wendy	Episode: 5th Quarter
