= Dale Raoul =

American film and television actress (born 1955)

- Born: August 16, 1955 (age 70); Missoula, Montana
- Occupation: Actress
- Years active: 1986–present
- Spouse: Ray Thompson

Dale Raoul (born Karen Dale Raoul August 16, 1955) is an American film and television actress known for her role as Maxine Fortenberry, mother of Hoyt Fortenberry, in the HBO television series True Blood.

== Career ==
Raoul was born in Missoula, Montana and studied at the University of Montana. She began her professional acting career at the Old Globe Theatre in San Diego, California, where she appeared in Hamlet and The Taming of the Shrew. She went on to perform in regional theatres before moving to Los Angeles.

Raoul first appeared on screen in an episode of Murder, She Wrote in 1986. Since then, she has been in more than 50 film and television productions. She appeared in a two-episode arc (Season 5, Episodes 1 and 2 "Weight Loss") as Ronni, Pam's replacement secretary at Dunder Mifflin, on the television series The Office. She made a guest appearance in the television sitcom Friends as a tenant in Ross's building ("The One With The Stain"). Raoul has also appeared on The Middle, Six Feet Under, NYPD Blue, The Drew Carey Show, Designing Women, Nash Bridges, Party of Five, Sabrina the Teenage Witch, and Knots Landing.

From 2008 to 2014, Raoul played town busybody Maxine Fortenberry on HBO's True Blood. From 2013 to 2014, she had a recurring role in the CBS series Under The Dome, playing Andrea Grinnell. In 2015, she appeared in The Bronze, which premiered opening night at the Sundance Film Festival. That same year, she starred in the comedic short film Open 24 Hours, which screened in competition at the Palm Springs International Festival of Short Films, Raindance Film Festival and Rhode Island International Film Festival.

Raoul has also worked as a voice actor.

== Personal life ==
Raoul has been married to Ray Thompson since 1986. Thompson is a six-time Emmy Award-winning lighting designer for his work on The Young and the Restless. Raoul and Thompson live in Los Angeles, California.

== Filmography ==
- The Lawnmower Man (1992) as Dolly
- Blast from the Past (1999) as Mom
- The Mexican (2001) as Estelle
- Friends (2001) as Mrs. Verhoeven
- Seven Pounds (2008) as St. Matthews Volunteer
- The Office (2008-2009) as Ronni
- Grey's Anatomy (2011) as NICU Nurse
- The Pretty One (2013) as Mrs. Shoemacher
- Under the Dome (2013-2014) as Andrea Grinnell
- The Bronze (2015) as Doris
