= Mackenzie Lintz =

American film and television actress

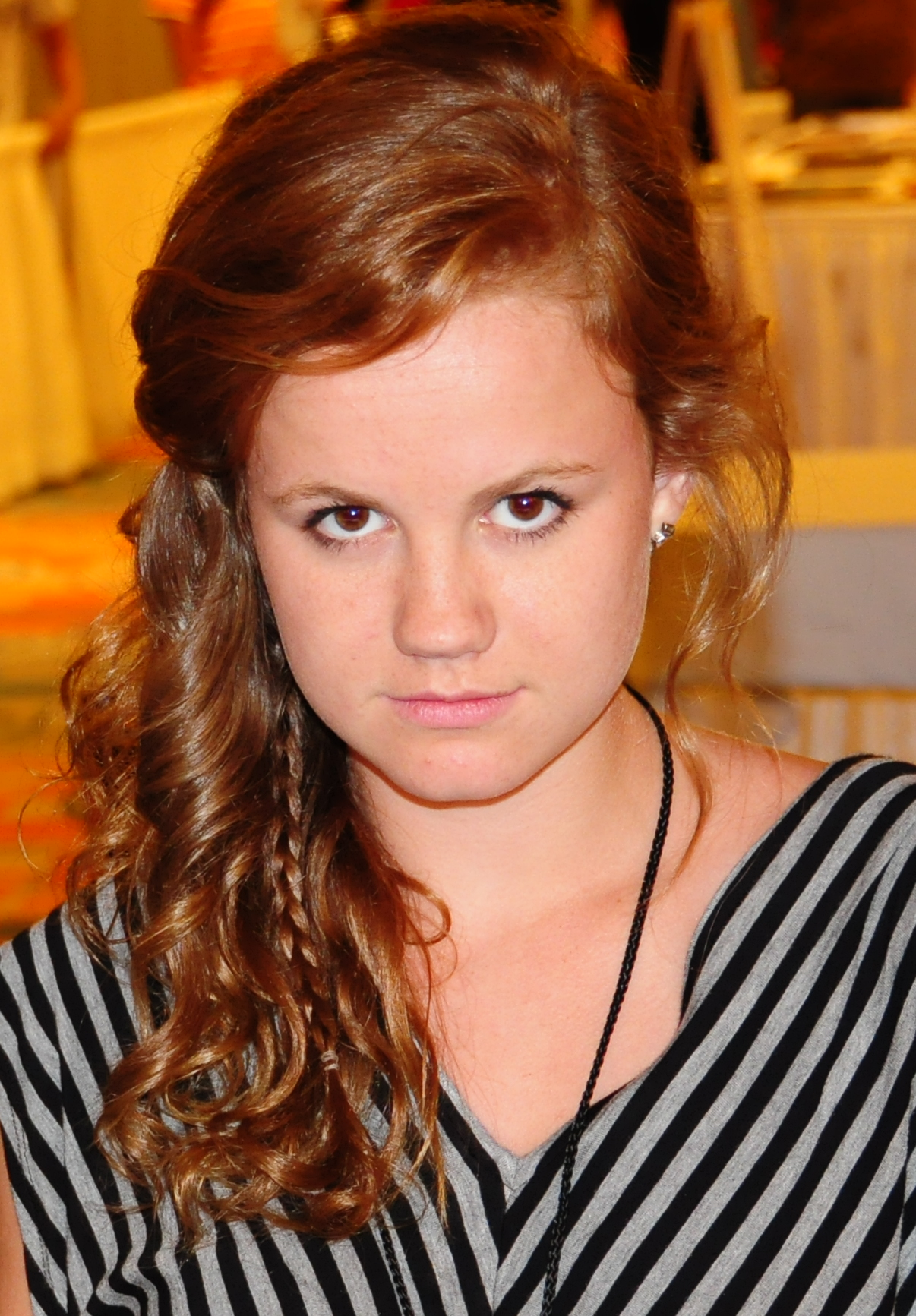
- Lintz at the 2012 Florida SuperCon
- Other name: Mackenzie Lintz Coleman
- Occupation: Actress
- Years active: 2011–2019
- Known for: The Hunger Games, Under the Dome, Love, Simon
- Spouse: Ward Coleman (m. 2022)
- Relatives: Madison Lintz (sister); Matt Lintz (brother)

Mackenzie Coleman (née Lintz) is a former American film and television actress. She is known for playing Norrie Calvert-Hill on the CBS television drama Under the Dome.

== Early life ==
She comes from a family of actors, including her mother, Kelly Lintz, and her three younger siblings, Madison Lintz, Matt Lintz, and Macsen Lintz. She attended South Forsyth High School for her freshman year before transferring to Covenant Christian Academy, both in Cumming, Georgia.

== Career ==
Coleman first auditioned for the role of Mattie Ross in the remake of True Grit by the Coen brothers. She was cast in an episode of Lifetime's Drop Dead Diva as well. In late 2011, she was cast in a minor role on The Hunger Games playing a tribute girl from District 8.

In May 2013, she auditioned for the role of Norrie Calvert-Hill in another book-to feature, Under the Dome, and was subsequently cast, portraying the role through all three seasons of the series.

In February 2014, she was nominated for the Best Performance by a Younger Actor in a Television Series award at the 40th Saturn Awards.

== Personal life ==
Mackenzie, a lifelong Auburn fan, enrolled in 2014 as a freshman at Auburn University in Auburn, Alabama. She dropped out of Auburn a year later and enrolled in 2017 at University of North Georgia. After graduating, Lintz pursued a doctorate in law, attending Charleston School of Law. In 2023 she graduated from Charleston School of Law.

On July 20, 2022, Lintz announced that she was married to her partner, Ward Coleman.

== Filmography ==
Film roles
Year	Title	Role
2012	The Hunger Games	District 8 Female
2018	Love, Simon	Taylor Metternich
2019	Flying Cars	Rachel

Television roles
Year	Title	Role	Notes
2011	Drop Dead Diva	Pamela Bovitz	Episode: "Closure"
2013–15	Under the Dome	Norrie Calvert-Hill	Main role (39 episodes)

== Awards and nominations ==
Year	Award	Category	Work	Result	Refs
2014	Saturn Award	Best Performance by a Younger Actor in a Television Series	Under the Dome	Nominated	
