= Under the Dome (TV series) =

2013 American science fiction drama television series

- Genre: Drama; Mystery thriller; Science fiction
- Based on: Under the Dome by Stephen King
- Developed by: Brian K. Vaughan
- Starring: Mike Vogel; Rachelle Lefevre; Natalie Martinez; Britt Robertson; Alexander Koch; Nicholas Strong; Colin Ford; Jolene Purdy; Aisha Hinds; Jeff Fahey; Dean Norris; Mackenzie Lintz; Eddie Cahill; Karla Crome; Kylie Bunbury
- Composers: W. G. Snuffy Walden; A. Patrick Rose
- Country of origin: United States
- Original language: English
- No. of seasons: 3
- No. of episodes: 39 (list of episodes)

Production
- Executive producers: Steven Spielberg; Stephen King; Stacey Snider; Darryl Frank; Justin Falvey; Jack Bender; Brian K. Vaughan; Neal Baer; Tim Schlattmann
- Producer: Randy Sutter
- Cinematography: Cort Fey; David Geddes; Derek E. Tindall; Walt Lloyd
- Editor: Timothy A. Good
- Running time: 43 minutes
- Production companies: Amblin Television; Baer Bones; CBS Television Studios

Original release
- Network: CBS
- Release: June 24, 2013 – September 10, 2015

Under the Dome is an American science fiction mystery drama television series that premiered on CBS on June 24, 2013, and concluded on September 10, 2015. The series was developed by Brian K. Vaughan and loosely based on the 2009 novel by Stephen King.

Under the Dome tells the story of the residents of the fictional small town of Chester's Mill, when a massive, transparent and indestructible dome suddenly cuts them off from the rest of the world. Military forces, the government, and the media start positioning themselves outside the barrier in an attempt to break it down. As this happens, the residents trapped inside find their own ways to survive with diminishing resources and rising tensions. A small group of people inside the dome unravel the complicated mysteries to figure out what the dome is, from where it came, and when — and if — it will go away.

The premiere in June 2013 broke the record as the most-watched summer drama premiere on any television network since 1992. The show continued to enjoy high viewership ratings throughout its first season, but the second and third seasons of the series had significant declines in viewership. Initially, Under the Dome had a positive critical reception, which changed into mixed reviews as the series progressed.

Under the Dome came to a conclusion in September 2015. Executive producer and showrunner Neal Baer stated in an interview after the finale aired: "I'm very happy with this ending. I feel very satisfied. We made it so there could be another [season] ... but it wasn't necessary."

== Cast and characters ==
The cast members portray characters who were mostly taken from the original novel, "although some have been combined and others have changed jobs".

=== Main ===
- Mike Vogel as Dale "Barbie" Barbara, an Iraq War veteran visiting Chester's Mill
- Rachelle Lefevre as Julia Shumway, an investigative reporter who becomes romantically involved with Barbie
- Natalie Martinez as Linda Esquivel, a loyal and ambitious deputy who is appointed sheriff by Big Jim (seasons 1–2)
- Britt Robertson as Angie McAlister, Joe's older sister who works as a waitress and volunteers as a candy striper with dreams of escaping Chester's Mill (seasons 1–2)
- Alexander Koch as James "Junior" Rennie, Big Jim's son and deputy sheriff
- Nicholas Strong as Phil Bushey, a popular radio DJ, then acting sheriff (seasons 1–2)
- Colin Ford as Joe McAlister, a teenager whose parents are outside of the dome; younger brother of Angie
- Jolene Purdy as Dorothy "Dodee" Weaver, a radio engineer who makes contact with the outside world (regular: season 1, guest: season 2)
- Aisha Hinds as Carolyn Hill, a Los Angeles entertainment attorney, trapped in Chester's Mill (regular: season 1, recurring: seasons 2–3)
- Jeff Fahey as Howard "Duke" Perkins, Sheriff of Chester's Mill (season 1)
- Dean Norris as James "Big Jim" Rennie, a town councilman and used-car dealer
- Mackenzie Lintz as Eleanor "Norrie" Calvert-Hill, Alice's and Carolyn's daughter and Joe's love interest (recurring: season 1, regular: seasons 2–3)
- Eddie Cahill as Sam Verdreaux, a reclusive EMT, and brother-in-law of Big Jim (seasons 2–3)
- Karla Crome as Rebecca Pine, a high school science teacher who is studying the dome (season 2)
- Kylie Bunbury as Eva Sinclair, a young anthropologist who has mysteriously arrived in Chester's Mill, and also as Dawn, the daughter of Eva and Dale, and the new queen of the Kinship (season 3)

=== Recurring ===
- John Elvis as Ben Drake, Joe's best friend (seasons 1–3)
- Dale Raoul as Andrea Grinnell, a local widow of a hoarder; suspicious about the numerous propane trucks coming into town (seasons 1–2)
- R. Keith Harris as Peter Shumway, Julia's husband (seasons 1–2)
- Megan Ketch as Harriet Arnold, Julia's friend; gives birth after touching the dome (seasons 1–3)
- Grace Victoria Cox as Melanie Cross, one of the original four hands who was killed in 1988; brought back to life by the dome (seasons 2–3)
- Brett Cullen as Don Barbara, the estranged father of Barbie; works for Aktaion Energy and is outside the dome (seasons 2–3)
- Max Ehrich as Hunter May, a computer hacker who works for Don Barbara (seasons 2–3)
- Mike Whaley as Malick, an agent from Aktaion Energy (seasons 2–3)

Season 1

- Samantha Mathis as Dr. Alice Calvert, Carolyn's wife and Norrie's mother
- Beth Broderick as Rose Twitchell, owner of Sweetbriar Rose
- Kevin Sizemore as Paul Randolph, a deputy sheriff
- Josh Carter as Eric "Rusty" Denton, a firefighter and Linda's fiancé; is outside the dome
- Ned Bellamy as Rev. Lester Coggins, a mortician involved in propane conspiracy and reverend of Chester's Mill
- Leon Rippy as Ollie Dinsmore, a local farmer with water wells who seeks to take the town from Big Jim
- Joe Knezevich as Freddy Denton, a deputy sheriff and Rusty's brother
- Andrew Vogel as Carter Thibodeau, a deputy sheriff
- Crystal Martinez as Nurse Adams
- Natalie Zea as Maxine Seagrave, a criminal acquaintance of Big Jim and Barbie
- Mare Winningham as Agatha Seagrave, a deceptively warm caretaker, who is Maxine's mother

Season 2

- Sherry Stringfield as Pauline Verdreaux Rennie, the late wife of Big Jim, mother of Junior, and sister of Sam; was thought to be dead, but was alive outside of the dome
- Dwight Yoakam as Lyle Chumley, a barber and one of the original four hands, who dated Pauline Verdreaux as a teen
- Estes Tarver as Tom Tilden, a local farmer whose pigs are infected

Season 3

- Marg Helgenberger as Christine Price, supposedly a therapist sent to help the town deal with the aftermath of the dome
- Eriq La Salle as Hektor Martin, cutthroat CEO of Aktaion Energy
- Bess Rous as Abby DeWitt, a resident who had her daughter taken away by social services
- Andrew J. West as Pete Blackwell, a construction worker
- Frank Whaley as Dr. Marston, a scientist working for Aktaion Energy
- Gia Mantegna as Lily Walters, a technician working for Aktaion Energy
- Vince Foster as Kyle Lee, a resident of Chester's Mill

== Plot synopsis ==
In 2013, two archaeologists, Christine and Eva, find an alien egg. As Christine holds it, a large pink explosion occurs, and a dome lowers around them, with a mini-dome descending over the egg. Christine and Eva are sucked into a large cave and cocooned.

Over the next six weeks, many events happen within the dome. Joe and Norrie find the mini-dome and the egg within it. The Kinship chooses Joe, Norrie, James, and Angie to be "the four hands," people who protect the dome, the mini dome, and the egg, and interact with them. Pink stars, a visible energy source, appear many times throughout the life of the dome, most noticeably on the egg.

Seasons 1 and 2 focus on the people inside the dome and on the mysterious nature of the dome. Season 3 provides answers to these mysteries.

In season 3, Christine resurrects Melanie, whom Christine uses to lure the townspeople into the caves so they can be cocooned and The Kinship can infect them. Halfway through the transfer process, Big Jim breaks the egg, preventing a full infection. Over time, the townspeople become absorbed by The Kinship, except for a few who fight the aliens and try to escape. These remnants of the townspeople are known as The Resistance: Julia, Big Jim, Joe, Norrie, Hunter, Barbie, and Lily, an employee of Aktaion.

After a while, the dome begins to deteriorate, because the egg is being destroyed. As a result, The Kinship and The Resistance must work together to escape; otherwise, the dome will turn to stone, and everyone will suffocate and die. They eventually bring down the dome. However, The Resistance plans to capture and kill The Kinship. Once the dome comes down, the government enters Chester's Mill and imprisons everyone, letting the non-infected people (The Resistance) remain free.

All is well until a year later when The Resistance discover The Kinship's leader, Dawn, is still alive, posing as a schoolteacher and traveling with children to find another egg and bring down a new dome. She finds an intact egg and says, "We'll come back another time."

== Development and production ==
=== Initial planning and announcement ===
The project was first announced in November 2009. Two years later Brian K. Vaughan was hired to adapt the novel as a series, then set up at cable network Showtime. Showtime entertainment president David Nevins felt that the series was not right for the network and suggested to Nina Tassler, his CBS counterpart, that she take on the project. Tassler was interested and picked up the series along with attaching veteran television producer Neal Baer, who was under contract at CBS, as the showrunner. It was announced in November 2012 that CBS had bypassed ordering a pilot and given Under the Dome a 13-episode straight-to-series commitment. "This is a great novel coming to the television screen with outstanding auspices and in-season production values to create a summer programming event," commented Tassler in the official CBS press release.

In January 2013, CBS released its summer 2013 schedule, which revealed that Under the Dome would premiere on June 24, 2013.

A teaser trailer was created specially for Super Bowl XLVII. Instead of showing footage, the teaser directed viewers to the show's official website, where they could enter their street address and postal code to view photos of what their homes and neighborhood would look like "under the dome".

=== Production ===
In the first season, Brian K. Vaughan and Stephen King served as executive producers along with Baer, Justin Falvey, Darryl Frank, Jack Bender, Steven Spielberg, and Stacey Snider. Danish director Niels Arden Oplev produced and directed the pilot. Baer served as the showrunner for the series. Vaughan exited the series before the premiere of season two, citing personal reasons. However, he had helped plan the second season with Baer and King before he left. Tim Schlattmann joined the series as an executive producer for season three.

Days before the series premiere aired on American television, the cast and executive producers of Under the Dome met in Wilmington, North Carolina, on June 20, 2013, for an advance screening of the pilot episode. During the presentation event, the city's mayor, Bill Saffo, declared Monday, June 24, 2013, as "Dome Day", and awarded Stephen King a key to the city.

On June 24, 2013, the night of the series premiere, entertainment website Vulture published an article about the economics of Under the Dome; to bring the expensive production (an estimated $3 million per episode) to life, CBS had struck a deal with Amazon Video that would bring new episodes to the platform four days after they debuted on CBS. That deal, estimated at $750,000 for each episode, covered one-quarter of each episode's estimated production cost. Additionally, the article says that foreign markets also played an important role in the financing, bringing in about $1.9 million, and with the North Carolina state tax credits the show earned for filming in the state, an estimated $400,000, meant CBS had already earned back the money they paid for each episode before the episodes even aired on TV. CBS president and CEO Leslie Moonves described the deals: "Combining Amazon with the international syndication deal makes Under the Dome profitable immediately".

On July 29, 2013, the series was renewed for a 13-episode second season, with executive producer and Under the Dome novel writer Stephen King announced to be writing the second-season premiere episode. The second season premiered on June 30, 2014, with King making a cameo appearance in the episode, as a customer in the Sweetbriar Rose diner. The second season ended on September 22, 2014.

On October 9, 2014, the series was renewed for a third season. During a CBS press briefing in May 2015, showrunner and executive producer Neal Baer promised answers in the new season. "We will tell you why the dome came down and what it's about", with new executive producer Tim Schlattman adding, "You'll see how these puzzle pieces form a puzzle that may be different from what you thought it would be".

A month later, Baer provided some insight on the series as a whole, saying that each season has "an overarching philosophy". "The first year was faith, fear and fascism. The second year was faith vs. science. This year, it's the individual vs. the group, with the theme being the enemy within."

The third season premiered on June 25, 2015. Following information from CBS entertainment chairman Nina Tassler in August that "The Dome is coming down at the end of this season", speculation started that the third season would also be the final season, which CBS confirmed at the end of the month.

In an interview after the series finale aired on September 10, 2015, Neal Baer said he was "very happy with this ending. I feel very satisfied. We made it so there could be another [season]… but it wasn't necessary."

Baer had previously stated in an interview in October 2013 that he knew what the ending of the show would be, and that five seasons of 13 episodes would be an ideal length. Despite this, when the series ended in 2015 after only three seasons, Baer said a potential fourth season would've been a "real challenge", as the third-season finale left the show in a situation where he questioned ""Then what?" Would we do the same thing again?"

=== Filming ===
Filming for the series officially began in Southport and Wilmington, both in North Carolina, on February 28, 2013. Additional filming took place in Burgaw. It was confirmed on October 9, 2014 that even after extensive cuts to the state tax credits, filming would remain in the Wilmington area for the show's third season.

== Episodes ==
Season	Episodes	Originally released		Average viewers (in millions)
Season	Episodes	First released	Last released	Average viewers (in millions)
1	13	June 24, 2013	September 16, 2013	11.21
2	13	June 30, 2014	September 22, 2014	7.17
3	13	June 25, 2015	September 10, 2015	4.70

== Reception ==
On June 27, 2013, King acknowledged that "the TV version of Under the Dome varies considerably from the book version", and called the series "very good" while commenting on some of those differences:

[If] you look closely, you'll see that most of my characters are still there, although some have been combined and others have changed jobs. That's also true of the big stuff, like the supermarket riot, the reason for all that propane storage, and the book's thematic concerns with diminishing resources. Many of the changes wrought by Brian K. Vaughan and his team of writers have been of necessity, and I approved of them wholeheartedly. Some have been occasioned by their plan to keep the dome in place over Chester's Mill for months instead of little more than a week, as is the case in the book. Other story modifications are slotting into place because the writers have completely reimagined the source of the dome.

=== Critical reception ===
==== Season 1 ====
The first season has a score of 68/100, based on 45 reviews, indicating "generally favorable reviews", on review aggregator website Metacritic. The season has a score of 83%, based on 52 reviews, on film and TV review aggregator Rotten Tomatoes; the site's critical consensus for the season reads: "Under the Dome is an effective and engrossing horror/mystery with airtight plotting and great special effects."

Positive reviews included Tim Goodman of The Hollywood Reporter, who wrote that "the intriguing Stephen King adaption is filled with storytelling promise", Glenn Garvin of the Miami Herald, who wrote that "based on the pilot episode — with its taut script, strong performances and special effects that are impressive without being overwhelming — there's hope that Under The Dome might measure up to its unsettling print progenitor", and Verne Gay of Newsday, who wrote that the show "looks like a summer winner". A negative review came from Matthew Gilbert of The Boston Globe, who wrote that "so much is working against Under the Dome, it's hard to get genuinely excited. While the arrival of the dome is intriguing, the characters are not".

==== Season 2 ====
The second season has a score of 52/100, based on nine reviews, indicating "mixed or average reviews", on review aggregator website Metacritic. The season has a score of 61%, based on 18 reviews, on film and TV review aggregator Rotten Tomatoes; the site's critical consensus for the season reads: "Though it reins in some of the first season's absurdity and shows potential for improvement, Under the Dome's second season still feels like a ride with no closure."

Negative reviews included Hank Stuever of The Washington Post, who wrote that "I just don't buy Under the Dome, on any level. I think the story is a shambles and the concept is dumb", and Verne Gay of Newsday, who wrote "Under the dumb". However, other critics were more positive; Mark Dawidziak of The Plain Dealer wrote that "If not top-tier TV terror fare, Under the Dome certainly is solid second-level stuff. And given the state of horror on television these days, that's a bloody good compliment. Even while acknowledging the occasional misstep, give Under the Dome credit for getting a lot of things right", while Sarah Rodman of The Boston Globe wrote that "there are glimmers of hope for season two".

==== Season 3 ====
The third season received mixed reviews. Positive reviews included Ken Tucker of Yahoo!, who wrote that "Under the Dome is certainly broadcast television's most enjoyable science-fiction/fantasy series, a summer treat that, while sometimes silly and over-the-top, is never less than energetically imaginative and aware of the history of its genre", Scott Von Doviak of The A.V. Club, who wrote that "this show is always more fun when it leans into its sci-fi elements", and Paul Dailly of TV Fanatic, who wrote that "All things considered, this was a solid, if unspectacular return for the show". Negative reviews included Kevin Yeoman of Screen Rant, who wrote that "There is a certain joy that comes from watching something as consistently moronic as Under the Dome", and Tim Surette of TV.com, who wrote that "it takes balls to think your audience is so dumb and brain dead that you feel the need to explain the big twist in the episode that's about to happen before the episode even begins".

=== Ratings ===
The Under the Dome series premiere aired June 24, 2013, and established new records. It was the highest-rated CBS summer premiere since Big Brother's 2000 season, the most-watched drama summer premiere on any television network since 1992, and the second highest rated premiere of the 2012–13 United States network television schedule after The Following. With DVR viewership figures added, the series premiere was viewed by a total of 17.76 million viewers.

Viewership and ratings per season of Under the Dome
Season	Timeslot (ET)	Episodes	First aired		Last aired		TV season	Avg. viewers (millions)	Avg. 18–49 rating
Season	Timeslot (ET)	Episodes	Date	Viewers (millions)	Date	Viewers (millions)	TV season	Avg. viewers (millions)	Avg. 18–49 rating
1	Monday 10 p.m.	13	June 24, 2013	13.53	September 16, 2013	12.10	2012–13	11.19	TBD
2	Monday 10 p.m.	13	June 30, 2014	9.41	September 22, 2014	7.52	2013–14	7.17	TBD
3	Thursday 9 p.m. (1); Thursday 10 p.m. (2–13)	13	June 25, 2015	6.25	September 10, 2015	4.23	2014–15	4.70	1.0/4

Under the Dome : U.S. viewers per episode (millions)

Season	Episode number													Average
Season	1	2	3	4	5	6	7	8	9	10	11	12	13	Average
1	13.53	11.81	10.71	11.13	11.60	11.41	10.42	10.36	10.64	11.11	11.15	9.72	12.10	11.21
2	9.41	7.70	7.64	6.74	6.57	6.83	6.90	7.30	6.60	6.29	6.62	7.04	7.52	7.17
3	6.25	6.25	5.28	5.12	4.75	4.63	4.68	3.88	3.73	4.04	4.60	3.70	4.23	4.70

Audience measurement performed by Nielsen Media Research

== Broadcast ==
In Canada, the series premiered on June 24, 2013, on Global Television Network. In Australia, the series premiered on June 25, 2013, on Network Ten, and on January 4, 2015, on TV H!TS. In the United Kingdom, the series premiered on August 19, 2013, on Channel 5. In the Republic of Ireland, the series premiered on September 12, 2014, on RTÉ2. On September 21, 2018, the entire series started a re-run on Horror Channel in the United Kingdom. In India, it is digitally available to stream on MX Player in Hindi, Tamil and Telugu languages. English is available to stream on Amazon Prime.

== Home media ==
Season	Episodes	DVD and Blu-ray release dates		
Season	Episodes	Region 1	Region 2	Region 4
1	13	November 5, 2013	November 18, 2013	November 27, 2013
2	13	December 9, 2014	December 29, 2014	December 3, 2014
3	13	December 8, 2015	December 14, 2015	December 17, 2015

A "Complete Series" DVD pack was released on June 20, 2017.
