= Infestation (disambiguation) =

Infestation is the state of being invaded or overrun by parasites or other pests.

Infestation may also refer to:

- Infestation (film), a film by American director Kyle Rankin
- Infestation (album), an album by American hard rock band Ratt
- Infestation (comics), a comic book crossover published by IDW Publishing
- Infestation (video game), action-adventure computer game released in 1990
- "Infestation" (Under the Dome), a television episode
- Centipede: Infestation, a top-down shooter video game released in 2011
- Infestation: Survivor Stories, a video game released in 2012, formerly known as The War Z
- Infestation: Origins, an upcoming 2024 video game based on Steamboat Willie
- The Infestation, a faction in the online game Warframe, described as a techno-organic plague that operates as a hive mind

== See also ==
- Infest (disambiguation)
- Infested (disambiguation)
