= A (The Walking Dead) =

- The Walking Dead episode
- The Claimers confront Rick and Michonne.
- Episode no.: Season 4 Episode 16
- Directed by: Michelle MacLaren
- Written by: Scott M. Gimple; Angela Kang
- Cinematography by: Michael E. Satrazemis
- Editing by: Julius Ramsay
- Original air date: March 30, 2014

Guest appearances
- Michael Cudlitz as Abraham Ford; Josh McDermitt as Eugene Porter; Christian Serratos as Rosita Espinosa; Jeff Kober as Joe; Alanna Masterson as Tara Chambler; Denise Crosby as Mary; Andrew J. West as Gareth; Tate Ellington as Alex; Vincent Martella as Patrick; Keith Brooks as Dan; J. D. Evermore as Harley; Davi Jay as Tony; Eric Mendenhall as Billy; Irene Ziegler as Broadcasting Woman

Episode chronology
← Previous "Us"	Next → "No Sanctuary"
- The Walking Dead season 4

"A" is the sixteenth and final episode of the fourth season of the post-apocalyptic horror television series The Walking Dead, which aired on AMC on March 30, 2014. The episode was written by Scott M. Gimple and Angela Kang, and directed by Michelle MacLaren.

As multiple paths collide on each group's travels, Rick (Andrew Lincoln) remembers the past and comes face to face with sheer brutality. As the so-called sanctuary, "Terminus", begins to reveal its true face, the group struggles to survive. Themes explored in this episode include preparedness and the extremities of living in a lawless world. The latter is explored through Rick's guilt and trauma after being forced to brutally murder two men to protect his son, Carl (Chandler Riggs).

== Plot ==
Flashbacks through the episode take place during the groups' time at the prison. Over an undetermined period, Hershel helps Rick to recognize that he has taken a violent, callous attitude toward protecting his group, and reminds him of how this has impressed on his son Carl, nor allowed himself to spend time with his infant daughter Judith. Rick comes to take Hershel's advice, deciding to put down his gun, take up farming alongside Carl, and enjoy time with the members of his group.

In the present, Rick, Carl, and Michonne follow signs along the tracks to Terminus. They hear cries for help and find a lone survivor surrounded by walkers. Rick warns them about conserving their ammunition and determines there is too much to risk in saving the man, and they watch him get killed by the walkers.

That night, they are ambushed by Joe and his gang of Claimers, whose number also includes the reluctant Daryl. Joe had been tracking Rick's group for some time, seeking revenge on Rick for killing one of his own. Joe holds Rick at gunpoint, and Daryl (who was unaware it was Rick's group being tracked) tries to convince Joe to not harm his friends. Joe refuses Daryl and has two of his men begin assaulting him before turning his attention back to Rick. Joe says that the Claimers are "reasonable people", but in revenge, he will have Daryl beaten to death, sexually assault Michonne, then Carl, and then kill Rick after he is forced to witness this. One Claimer, Dan, prepares to rape Carl. Instinctively, Rick headbutts Joe, who fires his gun but misses, but the shot leaves Rick temporarily deaf. Joe wrestles and secures Rick, but Rick then bites into Joe's carotid artery and rips out his jugular vein, killing him and shocking the other Claimers. Daryl and Michonne use the moment to break free of their captors, killing the rest of the Claimers except Dan. Dan pleads for his life, but Rick stabs him with Joe's knife and disembowels him, and then continues to stab him repeatedly to death, as Carl watches. Rick makes sure the others are safe, and he and Daryl reconcile, and Daryl explains that he got separated from Beth and is unaware of her fate.

Later, the four continue toward Terminus and soon come in sight of the train yard. Rick is concerned and decides to bury most of their weapons nearby before they enter. They are greeted at Terminus by brothers Gareth (Andrew J. West) and Alex (Tate Ellington), and they check their weapons before returning them to the group. Alex provides them with a tour of Terminus, providing them with food from their mother Mary. Rick notices several items belonging to his friends, including a poncho, backpack, and riot armor taken from the prison, and inside Alex’s cargo pants pocket the silver chain of the pocketwatch that Hershel had given to Glenn as his sign of approval for marrying his daughter Maggie. Rick takes Alex at gunpoint and demands to know where he found the pocket watch. Gareth, observing from a distance, orders his men to attack, starting a large firefight. Rick uses Alex as a bullet shield, before he and the others are forced into a series of alleyways, and eventually into a closed-in area, where they have nowhere to hide from snipers. Gareth demands they drop their weapons, and the group is escorted into a boxcar where they find that the Terminus residents have already captured Glenn, Maggie, Bob, and Sasha, along with new allies Abraham, Rosita, Eugene, and Tara. When they are locked in, Rick tells the others "they're screwing with the wrong people."

== Production ==
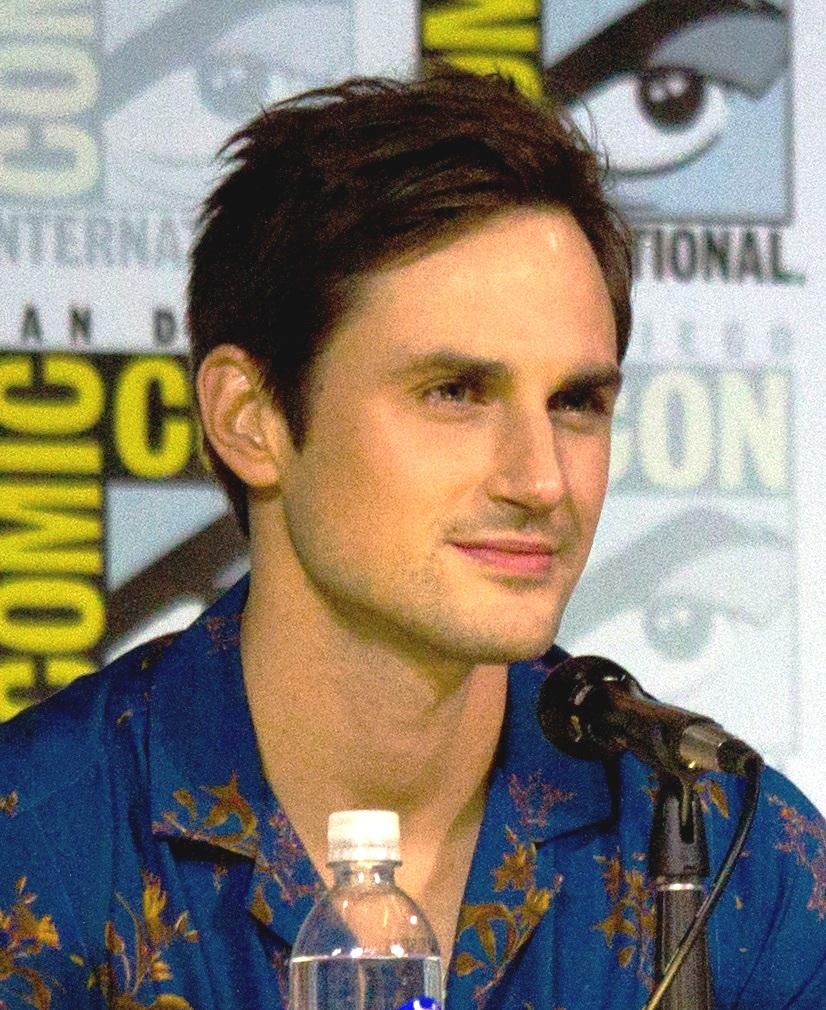
Andrew J. West made his first appearance as Gareth in this episode.

"A" was co-written by executive producer and showrunner Scott M. Gimple and producer Angela Kang; it was each their third writing credit for the season. It was directed by Michelle MacLaren, who previously directed season two's "Pretty Much Dead Already" and season one's "Guts".

It marks the final episode to feature Hershel Greene, although in a flashback sequence, following the character's death in "Too Far Gone". For this episode, Scott Wilson is readded to the opening credits after being removed after the ninth episode of the season.

The episode marks the final appearance of recurring character Joe (played by Jeff Kober) as he was killed by Rick Grimes by biting out his jugular vein. The scene where Rick, Michonne and Carl are captured by Joe's gang was intentionally shot and produced to follow a certain portion of the plotline in "Volume 10", "Issue #57" of the comic book series. The main difference is in the comics, Rick, Carl, and Abraham are captured by three bandits, whereas in the show, Rick, Carl, and Michonne are captured by Joe's gang of five men.

During filming of the final scene, Andrew Lincoln remarked that he delivered the final line which was very close to the one found in "Volume #11", "Issue #64" of the comic book series. Scott Gimple noted that this would never have passed the network censors, so they had to re-take another version of the final scene without the swearing. Despite this, the scene with the swearing is considered the canonical version. The home video release of the episode shows the uncensored version of the final line of the season, "They're fucking with the wrong people."

== Reception ==
=== Viewership ===
Upon airing, the episode was watched by 15.68 million American viewers, and received an 18–49 rating of 8.0. This marks a rise in total viewers and ratings from the previous episode, which received an 18–49 rating of 6.7 and 13.47 million viewers. This rating represents the season finale high to date, but below the all-time high of the season four premiere episode. Overall, season four's average viewership of 13.3 million viewers was an increase of 20% over season three.

=== Critical reception ===
The episode received critical acclaim. Writing for Forbes, Allen St. John, commented the finale positively, saying, "This episode, directed masterfully by Michelle McLaren of Breaking Bad fame, puts The Walking Dead in an interesting place. The story line takes our heroes into a dark place—and what can be darker than a locked railroad car?"

IGN's Roth Cornet rated the episode a "Great" 8.0, writing, "The Walking Dead Season 4 finale served as a response to a question Rick has been asking himself nearly since the start of the series: What kind of man am I? The answer, at least to some degree, is whatever kind of man the moment demands of him; which is exactly what he’d need to be in order to make a strong and viable leader in this world. While I do feel that the conclusion could have been stronger, this was one of the most well-directed and executed episodes of the latter half of this season."
