= Hyperion Heights =

- Once Upon a Time episode
- Episode no.: Season 7 Episode 1
- Directed by: Ralph Hemecker
- Written by: Edward Kitsis; Adam Horowitz
- Cinematography by: Tony Mirza
- Editing by: Mark J. Goldman
- Original air date: October 6, 2017
- Running time: 42 minutes

Guest appearances
- Mekia Cox as Tiana/Sabine; Jared S. Gilmore as 18-year-old Henry; Adelaide Kane as Drizella Tremaine/Ivy Belfrey; Rose Reynolds as Alice/Tilly; Jillian Fargey as the Fairy Godmother; Liam Hall as the Prince; Darcy Laurie as Louie

Episode chronology
| ← Previous "The Final Battle" | Next → "A Pirate's Life" |
- Once Upon a Time season 7

"Hyperion Heights" is the first episode of the seventh season and the 134th episode overall of the American fantasy-drama series Once Upon a Time. Directed by Ralph Hemecker and written by series co-creators Edward Kitsis and Adam Horowitz, it premiered on ABC in the United States on October 6, 2017. This episode marks a soft reboot in the series, with a new setting and set of characters compared to prior seasons.

The seventh season revolves around an older Henry Mills, who leaves Storybrooke in order to figure out what his story is. This episode introduces new iterations of characters that had been featured in prior seasons, such as Cinderella, and a new curse which transported the inhabitants of the New Enchanted Forest into a fictionalized Seattle neighborhood named Hyperion Heights.

Upon its original airing, "Hyperion Heights" was watched by 3.26 million viewers and garnered a 0.7/3 Nielsen rating/share. It received mixed to positive reviews from critics.

== Plot ==
=== Opening sequence ===
The episode opens with the same slideshow of text from the pilot episode. For the title card, Seattle's backdrop and the Space Needle are featured, alongside a new set of animations and transitions for the title logo, as well as a modified opening of the theme music.

=== In the characters' past ===
==== Storybrooke ====
With everyone's story now fulfilled, Henry plans on setting out to find his own story by travelling to new realms described in the storybooks found in the Sorcerer's mansion. He explains that he discovered that there's different versions of characters they've already met and know, but that there are no other versions of him. He is unique among all the versions of all the realms and he wants to find his own place among them. Though Regina worries he's too young to be leaving home, he assures her that he will be fine, taking August's motorcycle with him as he uses a magic bean (given to him by Tiny as a graduation present) to open a portal into another realm.

==== New Enchanted Forest ====
Years later, as Henry rides through a forest, he narrowly avoids a collision with an oncoming carriage, resulting in the woman inside being thrown to the ground. Realizing he has met this realm's version of Cinderella, he offers her a ride to the ball as an apology. Cinderella, however, knocks him out and takes the motorcycle once she's been shown how it works, with Henry chasing her. At the same time, Lady Tremaine is about to set off for the palace, having clipped the Fairy Godmother's wings and taken her wand. When questioned why she is doing this, she explains to Drizella that magic has no power compared to fear, a point she drives home by destroying the Fairy Godmother.

As Cinderella arrives at the ball, she tries to make her way to the prince, but is confronted by Henry. When pressed about why she stole his bike and a dagger of his, she admits that she had an ulterior motive for coming to the ball; she plans on killing the prince, as vengeance for ruining her family and driving her father to an early death. Henry tries to talk her out of it and gives her a hyacinth flower for luck, telling her that he is returning to his own realm at midnight, and that she could start a new life there. Before he can pursue her any further, however, he blacks out and learns that his drink was drugged by Alice, a mysterious woman ordered by Rumpelstiltskin to keep an eye on Henry. Despite her warnings of the dangers of meddling in someone else's story, Henry chooses to stay and help. As Cinderella meets the prince, she pulls out the dagger, but eventually has a change of heart. Unfortunately, Tremaine takes the opportunity to kill him for turning down Drizella, and frames Cinderella for the murder. As the guards close in, Henry breaks out of his trance and helps Cinderella to escape, reiterating his offer and telling her to meet him where her carriage crashed.

After escaping the palace, Henry returns to the carriage and prepares to open a portal, assuming Cinderella has abandoned the idea. Upon discovering one of her glass slippers, however, he takes it as a sign, and chooses to remain in the new realm to undertake "Operation Glass Slipper".

=== In Seattle ===
Henry is now making ends meet as a freelance cab driver, struggling with writer's block after the failure of his book, Once Upon a Time. When Lucy arrives at his apartment, she tells Henry that she is his daughter and that his family needs him, although Henry refuses to believe her and turns her away. The next day, Jacinda, Lucy's mother, shows up late for work at Cluck's Chicken, but quits when calling out her boss for his bad temper. When she returns to her apartment, she tells her roommate, about having quit her job, but is stunned to find that Lucy has snuck out without her knowledge. In Belfrey Tower, Jacinda's stepmother Victoria grows increasingly irritated with what she sees as Jacinda's irresponsibility, and plans on taking full custody of her granddaughter, all while buying out smaller businesses and raising rent to push the cursed inhabitants out of the neighborhood.

Later on, Henry discovers his laptop missing and finds a note to meet at Roni's Bar to get it back from Lucy. After a brief encounter with a woman named Tilly, he goes to Roni's, and is greeted by the eponymous owner, who happens to be Regina with her memories stripped by the curse. Meanwhile, Jacinda finds Lucy at the wishing well in the community garden, who tells her that she found Henry, despite her mother's skepticism. Jacinda then returns the laptop back to Henry, and the two are encouraged by Roni to share a drink. However, Victoria shows up, ready to buy out Roni's bar and to deal with Jacinda, telling her that she'll be taking full custody of Lucy. Henry attempts to defuse the tension between the three, but is warned by Victoria to stay out of her business. Afterwards, Lucy meets him at the garden, and attempts to convince him about the curse, only for Henry to reveal that his wife and child perished in a fire years ago. Finding that his car has been stolen, Henry goes to the nearby police station, and reports it missing to a cursed Killian Jones, who now lives as Officer Rogers with no memories of his past life. In another part of town, Tilly enters an abandoned warehouse to find her boss, Rumpelstiltskin, now living under the cursed identity of Detective Weaver, and informs him of Henry's arrival.

Back at the garden, Lucy is planting seeds around the well, when Jacinda arrives to take her to Bainbridge Island across the sound, so they can be together and escape from Victoria. When they arrive at the town line, Jacinda's car breaks down and the elevator to the docks has been closed, which Lucy believes means they're trapped in Hyperion Heights, much like the residents of Storybrooke were. At the police station, Victoria interrupts Henry and Rogers to ask the officer to help find Lucy and Jacinda, believing that Henry knows something. Victoria's daughter Ivy and Officer Rogers find the pair, who have decided to stay and fight Victoria's claim. As Ivy gives Lucy's Once Upon a Time book to Rogers, and insists that it be thrown away, Rogers catches sight of a specific page featuring a picture of Emma Swan.

Later that night, Victoria returns to Roni's with a contract to have Roni sign over the place. Unfortunately, Roni changes her mind and tells Victoria that she is not selling out. Having been inspired by Jacinda's decision, she tells Victoria that she won't be ordered around by her, and this is just the beginning. At the same time, Rogers examines a picture of Emma Swan in Lucy's book, and learns that his new partner is Detective Weaver. Henry begins work on a new story, and Jacinda returns to her job at Cluck's Chicken. On her way home, Jacinda finds a quarter and uses it to make a wish at the well, causing a hyacinth flower to sprout out of the ground.

== Development ==
"Hyperion Heights" was directed by Ralph Hemecker and written by Edward Kitsis and Adam Horowitz. In January 2017, while season 6 was still in production, ABC president Channing Dungey spoke of a possible "reset" of the show's narrative. After much speculation, executive producers Adam Horowitz and Edward Kitsis later confirmed that certain characters would have their storylines wrapped up and that the back-end of the sixth season had been written with the season 7 narrative change in mind. Despite the major changes from seasons past, the showrunners have said that they do not view season 7 as a reboot of the show: "We're more thinking about it as a hybrid of a lot of things. We're paying homage to the original premise, but there are certain characters who are returning and some who are not. It's a combination of a lot of things, but what we're trying to do is go in a new direction but stay true to the spirit of what the show has always been." ABC renewed the series for a seventh season on May 11, 2017. The premiere date was revealed in July, along with announcement of the new timeslot, Fridays. The table read for the season premiere episode began on July 7, 2017.

== Casting ==
In May 2017, it was announced that Lana Parrilla, Colin O'Donoghue, and Robert Carlyle would be the only series regulars from season 6 to continue onto season 7. It was teased that the three would be portraying their original characters but with cursed identities, similar to the circumstances in season 1. In July, the first promo of the season revealed that Killian was a Seattle police officer with the last name Rogers, who is living with an unexplained sense of loss. In August, it was revealed that Regina would be a bar owner named Roni, who is more dressed down and is "no longer in charge."

In March 2017, Andrew J. West and Alison Fernandez were cast for unknown guest roles in the season six finale. During the episode, it was revealed that West was portraying an adult Henry Mills, while Fernandez portrayed his daughter, Lucy. After that episode's airing, they were confirmed as series regulars for season 7. On July 6, 2017, it was announced that Dania Ramirez and Gabrielle Anwar would be two additional series regulars for season 7. Additionally, Adelaide Kane, Mekia Cox, and Rose Reynolds were cast in recurring roles for the upcoming season. On July 15, it was announced that Ramirez would be portraying Cinderella, albeit a different iteration from the one previously played by Jessy Schram for the first six seasons. On July 22 at San Diego Comic-Con, it was revealed that Anwar and Kane would be portraying Lady Tremaine and Drizella, respectively. Cox would be portraying Tiana from The Princess and the Frog, while Reynolds would be playing a different iteration of Alice, a character previously portrayed by Sophie Lowe in the spin-off series Once Upon a Time in Wonderland.

Liam Hall (the Prince), Jillian Fargey (the Fairy Godmother) and Darcy Laurie (Louie) also appear in co-starring roles.

== Cultural references ==
- During the episode, a sticker of Lost's fictional band Geronimo Jackson is seen in Henry's laptop.
- Elements from both the 1950 film and the classic Cinderella tale receive a rendition in this episode, as well as the protagonist of The Princess and the Frog and Alice's Adventures in Wonderland's Alice.
- The scene where Victoria enters the Belfrey Towers is a homage to the 2006 film The Devil Wears Prada, in which Meryl Streep's Miranda Priestly enters the Runway building in a similar way.
- The name "Hyperion" is a reference to Hollywood's Hyperion Avenue, where the two original Animation Buildings of the Disney company were located. They are mainly known for being the place where Snow White and the Seven Dwarfs was made. Eventually, in the 1940s, these buildings were moved to the studio lot in Burbank, where they have been rebuilt and renamed. The writing office of Once Upon a Time was relocated there shortly before production of the seventh season began.

== Reception ==
=== Ratings ===
"Hyperion Heights" premiered on October 6, 2017, on ABC. It was watched by 3.26 million Americans, acquiring a 0.7/3 rating/share among adults aged 18–49, according to Nielsen Media Research.

=== Critical response ===
The premiere received mixed response from critics, with some finding it hard to get used to a "reset" of the show's narrative, while others praised the new directions. Paul Dailly of TV Fanatic wrote a positive review for the episode, giving it a 4.2 out of 5 stars rating and stating, "With a new location and characters, the show is returning to its former glory. My only hope is that if this season turns out to be a success, they do not drag the stories on for dear life." Entertainment Weekly's Justin Kirkland gave a A− letter rating along with a favorable commentary. Emmaline Harvey of SpoilerTV eulogized the previous timeline, saying, "I felt Once was starting to get repetitive the last few seasons, and while this is nearly identical to the plot in the pilot, I'm really encouraged by the new characters. I think it's a fun, fresh new start to the series." Nick Hogan of TVOvermind gave the episode a 4 out of 5 stars rating, labeling it as a new pilot and glorifying Edward Kitsis and Adam Horowitz's ability of "make a quality episode of television." Conversely, Gwen Ihnat of The A.V. Club deemed the new settings and storylines "hard to sell," providing a C letter rating.
