= The Final Battle (Once Upon a Time) =

- Once Upon a Time episodes
- Episode nos.: Season 6 Episodes 21 & 22
- Directed by: Steve Pearlman (part 1); Ralph Hemecker (part 2)
- Written by: Edward Kitsis & Adam Horowitz
- Production code: 621/622
- Original air date: May 14, 2017

Guest appearances
- Deniz Akdeniz as Aladdin; Lee Arenberg as Grumpy/Leroy; Karen David as Jasmine; Beverley Elliott as Granny; Alison Fernandez as Lucy/Little Girl; Sean Maguire as Robin of Locksley (voice); Giles Matthey as Morpheus/Gideon; Jaime Murray as Black Fairy/Fiona; Raphael Sbarge as Jiminy Cricket/Archie Hopper; Olivia Steele Falconer as Violet; Sara Tomko as Tiger Lily; Andrew J. West as Henry Mills (adult)/Young Man

Episode chronology
← Previous "The Song in Your Heart"	Next → "Hyperion Heights"
- Once Upon a Time season 6

"The Final Battle" is a two-part story comprising the twenty-first and twenty-second episodes of the sixth season of the American fantasy drama series Once Upon a Time, both of which aired on May 14, 2017. Both episodes served together as the sixth season finale.

In the episode, Henry and Emma work together to defeat the Black Fairy; in the Enchanted Forest, Snow, David, Hook, Regina, Zelena, the Queen, Aladdin, and Jasmine team up to save the worlds from being destroyed.

== Plot ==
=== Opening sequence ===
The Seattle Monorail is seen in the forest. (Part 1, Part 2 in later releases)

No special element is featured in the title card. (Part 2)

The giant beanstalk springs from the ground in the forest. (Part 1 in later releases)

=== Event chronology ===
The Storybrooke events take place after the current events of "The Song in Your Heart", while the current events in the Enchanted Forest occur after "Mother's Little Helper".

The future events depicted in both parts occurs in a new realm during the events of "The Eighth Witch" and "Hyperion Heights".

=== Part 1 ===
==== In an enchanted forest ====
In the woods, a man is seen running away from a beast. He reaches a cabin and sends his daughter away with the Once Upon a Time storybook, telling her to keep it safe as he fights off a creature.

==== In Storybrooke and the Enchanted Forest ====
Fiona enacted her curse on the entire town, engulfing everyone after the wedding. However, Henry, who is spared, wakes up with his storybook in his hands, and starts searching for his family. After running into Archie, he tells Henry that Emma is at the hospital, where she has been committed to a psychiatric ward for the past two years. While visiting Emma, he learns that with Fiona's curse, Regina's original curse was never broken, and Emma had stopped believing him. He asks her where Snow, Hook and David are, but the new curse now has Emma believing that these events never happened. Fiona (who is now the Mayor and Henry's "mother") arrives and takes the book from Henry, but before he leaves, he whisperedly tells Emma to resist.

Snow, David, Hook and Regina wake up and find themselves back in the Enchanted Forest, specifically at the palace where the events that led to the first curse began. They discover it is a prison for them and is tied to the book. Fiona, who is using this to banish Emma's family, tells Emma that she must burn the storybook if she wants to be released from the hospital, but Emma refuses. Back in the Enchanted Forest, everyone realizes that the Final Battle is over Emma's soul and belief. Fiona is trying to get Emma to stop believing so that the realms of story will cease to exist. When Zelena shows up with one of Jefferson's hats, they use it to reach a hallway of portals, where they find Oz disappeared. At the same time in Storybrooke, Fiona brings lunch to Gold and asks that he fixes her watch, as it appears that she is now his primary support in the wake of Belle's "disappearance".

The realms start to crumble under Fiona's curse, forcing all of its survivors to take shelter in the Evil Queen's castle, including Aladdin and Jasmine. Outside, Hook and David return to the magic beanstalk, in hopes of finding a magic bean that will get everyone back to Storybrooke. Henry breaks Emma out of the hospital and takes his mother to the rooftop where she was married, in hopes that she will remember her wedding to Hook. She has glimpses of her memories, but Emma has doubts and tells Henry that she wants to return to Boston, for fear that Fiona will put her back in the psychiatric ward. Meanwhile, Gideon is extremely upset with Belle "deserting" him and now sees Fiona as more of a mother than Belle, and Gold's attempts to console his son don't help either. When Gold searches through his belongings, he also discovers that most of his magic potions has been removed by Fiona's curse.

Regina and Zelena try to work on a potion but find most of the ingredients missing, when the Queen arrives and offers to help, having been forced to flee from the Wish Realm with that realm's Robin due to its residents' hostility. Henry attempts to steal the storybook back from Fiona but she catches him, and believes that she can use him to control Emma. As Henry escapes, Fiona uses her magic to push him down the stairs. Moments later, Gold asks Fiona to reopen the investigation into Belle's disappearance. As Fiona tries to talk him out of it, she shows him pictures of Belle enjoying life in other countries, and wants Gold to move on.

Hook and David began their search for the magic beans and Hook eventually finds one, only to encounter a dragon, which chases them down the beanstalk. At the hospital, Henry wakes up and discovers that Fiona is manipulating Emma during their visit, and eventually succeeds in convincing Emma to burn the storybook. Most of the realms depicted in the book begins to be consumed by the curse, which arrives on the outskirts of the Enchanted Forest in the form of a massive storm of dark magic. As the book is burning, the pages flip to a picture of Hook, and Emma stares at his image as the flames consume the page.

=== Part 2 ===
==== In an enchanted forest ====
The young girl returns to her home and discovers everything destroyed. However, Tiger Lily shows up and tells her to take the book to her mother, telling her that the fairies foresaw that she will be reunited with her father and to never give up on the lesson the book gives, to never lose hope.

==== In Storybrooke and the Enchanted Forest ====
Fiona brings what was left of the book to Henry and gloats that Emma has lost her faith, though Henry refuses to accept this. Emma leaves Storybrooke to return to Boston. When she gets back to her apartment there, she discovers that Henry left her a hand-drawn storybook in order to make her remember their past. Meanwhile, as the realms are starting to collapse, David and Hook escape the dragon, but while climbing down the beanstalk, they lose their balance and fall. Snow and Jasmine set out to find them, eventually finding Hook, and Snow tells him to take the bean back to the castle. Finding an unconscious David, Snow kisses him and he wakes.

Henry goes to the pawnshop and meets with Gold, who attempts to feign ignorance of the curse. Henry head towards the shop's back and uncovers Gold's potions, proving that Gold still remembers his past. Gold acknowledges Henry's cleverness, but also refuses to help Henry as his primary concern is finding Belle. Henry decides that he should take on Fiona himself, and Gold heals his injuries and allows him to take David's old sword. Regina and the Queen discover that the bean had withered and lost its magic, because Fiona's curse has caused Emma's lack of faith to drain the magic from the realm. As the storm closes in, the Queen decides to sacrifice herself and protect the castle, in order to buy enough time for Regina to restore the bean, while everyone else gathers in the courtyard. However, Regina fails to restore the bean in time, and the storm bursts into the castle and surrounds them. When Henry arrives at the Mayor's office, Emma returns. She tells Henry that while she doesn't remember being who Henry tells her that she is, she does believe that she can be that person with his help. Her renewed belief stops the destruction of the Enchanted Forest just in time. Meanwhile, Gold uses a tracking spell on the "Her Handsome Hero" book to find Belle, who was hiding from Fiona, having been turned into a coward by Fiona's curse. Gold tells her about Fiona's deception, and angrily vows revenge on Fiona for what she had done to Belle.

Fiona stops by the pawn shop to see Gideon, with the knowledge of Emma regaining her belief, and reveals that she has reclaimed Gideon's heart with the curse. She orders Gideon to recover her own wand, which she uses to decipher the mysterious writings that Henry had scribbled, then sends him to kill Emma. When Gold confronts Fiona about her plans, she tells her son that once the Final Battle is won, she would be able to allow Gold to have both love and power. Gold tells her that it would come with a steep price, as he secretly slips Fiona's wand into his hand, subduing her. Fiona tells Gold that she had deciphered Henry's writing, having also given Gideon one final command – to kill Emma, and that even if she dies, Gideon will still be forced to carry it out. Gold decides to test this and kills Fiona with her own wand, breaking the curse. This causes Snow, David, Regina, Hook and Zelena to be transported back to Storybrooke whilst the other refugees are returned to their own realms, while Emma and the residents of Storybrooke regain their memories. Soon afterwards, Belle returns to Gold and comforts him over his actions, while Gideon confronts Emma with the Hrunting in his hand.

Both Gold and Belle set off to search for Gideon's heart. Henry helps Emma escape from Gideon with Emma placing a protection spell to contain him temporarily. The others realize that Fiona has crafted the perfect trap: if Gideon kills Emma, light will be destroyed, and if Emma kills Gideon, she will turn dark and light will still be destroyed. Regina consoles Emma and encourages her to find another way like she always does. Emma attempts to hold off Gideon, as Gold finds Gideon's heart. Once he finds it, he is tempted by a manifestation of the Darkness, which takes the form of his Enchanted Forest counterpart, Rumplestiltskin. The manifestation tells him to let Gideon kill Emma so he can finally have it all. Gold resists the temptation and tries to use Gideon's heart to stop him from killing Emma, however, Fiona's spell keeps him from doing so. Back at the intersection, Emma and Gideon fight with Emma acknowledging her role as the Savior. Realizing what she must do, Emma surrenders and Gideon apologizes and runs her through, releasing an enormous blast of light magic, ending the Final Battle and causing Gideon to disappear.

As everyone gathers around Emma, Henry awakens Emma using true love's kiss, while Gold and Belle discover that Gideon is once again a baby, realizing that this is their new start as a family. Henry's storybook re-manifests, and Snow arrives to pick it up. Henry looks at the final page of the storybook which writes itself with the words "When both good and evil did the right thing, faith was restored. The final battle was won." Snow reminds everyone that the story isn't over. All the realms are restored and their residents embark on their happy beginnings, as does everyone in Storybrooke. Emma and Hook patrol as the town sheriffs, Henry goes back to school, Regina returns to her role as mayor with the dwarfs giving her the title "queen", Zelena spends time with baby Robin, David farms with a growing Neal, Gold and Belle renew their relationship and raise Gideon together, Snow becomes a teacher again, and Wish Realm Robin proposes to the Queen in Regina's restored palace. They all gather together at Granny's to celebrate their lives together.

==== In Seattle ====
Many years later in Seattle, Lucy arrives at a man's apartment by train. Lucy tells the man, who is revealed to be an adult Henry, that she is his daughter and that his family needs him, although Henry no longer remembers her.

== Production ==
"The Final Battle" marks the last appearances as regulars of six cast members: Jennifer Morrison, Ginnifer Goodwin, Josh Dallas, Jared S. Gilmore, Emilie de Ravin and Rebecca Mader. The episodes' bookends set up new timelines that continues in the seventh season. Gilmore's character, Henry Mills, was played as an adult by Andrew J. West, who along with newcomer Alison Fernandez, would become regulars for the seventh season.

Sean Maguire does not appear in the episode, but is credited, as he lends his voice for a few seconds in a scene with the Evil Queen.

This also marks the series' final Sunday night airing after six seasons, as ABC announced on May 16, 2017, that the series would move to Friday nights for the seventh season.

== Notes ==
- Even though the title card stated "The Enchanted Forest" during the future events involving adult Henry and his daughter Lucy, it is later revealed to be a new realm, the New Enchanted Forest.

== Reception ==
=== Ratings ===
Despite a 25% drop from the fifth season's finale, the episode saw an increase from the previous outing, scoring a 0.9/4 among 18-49s with 2.93 million viewers tuning in.

=== Reviews ===
- Christine Laskodi of TV Fanatic gave the episode full marks: 5.0 out of 5.0
- Entertainment Weekly gave the episode an A.
- The AV Club gave it a B.
