= Middle Man (film) =

- Directed by: Ned Crowley
- Written by: Ned Crowley
- Produced by: William Fortney; Roger Petrusson; Gerald Webb
- Starring: Jim O'Heir; Andrew J. West; Josh McDermitt; Anne Dudek; Tracey Walter
- Cinematography: Dick Buckley
- Edited by: Chris Claeys
- Music by: Robert Guillory
- Production company: Lamb Bone Films
- Release date: June 10, 2016 (SIFF)
- Running time: 104 minutes
- Country: United States
- Language: English

Middle Man is a 2016 American black comedy film written and directed by Ned Crowley. It stars Jim O'Heir as Lenny, an unfunny, aspiring standup comedian who, on a road trip to Las Vegas, picks up a mysterious hitchhiker, played by Andrew J. West. Believing himself responsible for the death of a heckler, Lenny publicly confesses, becoming an instant hit for what audiences perceive as transgressive humor.

== Plot ==
After the death of his beloved mother, middle-aged Peoria accountant Lenny Freeman quits his job to follow his dream of becoming a stand-up comedian. Freeman bids a fond farewell to his coworkers, who barely acknowledge him, and takes his mother's 1953 Oldsmobile on a road trip to Las Vegas, where he intends to audition for a standup competition run by Vegas showman Monte Guy. Freeman, an obsessive fan of vaudeville and other early 20th century comedy, becomes confused by the more obnoxious and transgressive humor preferred by the people he meets. Along the way, he picks up a hitchhiker nicknamed Hitch whose previous rides are shown to have either disappeared or died mysteriously. When Hitch learns that Freeman intends to become a standup comedian, he shares career advice and agrees to become Freeman's manager.

On Hitch's advice, Freeman performs at a local comedy club's open mic night. Freeman follows T-Bird, the town's most popular comic, and bombs horribly, alienating the audience with his stale jokes and clean-cut persona. In convincing Freeman not to give up, Hitch advises him to instead visualize himself murdering the hecklers and incorporate this edginess into his act. The next morning, Freeman finds the corpse of a heckler in his car. Fearing that he murdered the heckler in fit of drunken rage, Freeman drives into the desert to bury the body. This proves more difficult than anticipated, necessitating dismembering the corpse and exhuming it when it becomes obvious the spot they chose is not suitable.

Hitch insists Freeman appear again at the open mic now that he has inspiration for new material. In shock and wearing a bloodstained shirt, Freeman makes a public confession to the murder and subsequent attempts to cover it up. The audience interprets this as black comedy, and Freeman displaces T-Bird as the town's most popular, transgressive comic. Freeman further draws the enmity of T-Bird when Freeman stands up for Grail, T-Bird's abused girlfriend. As Grail and Freeman grow closer, Hitch reveals he was the one who murdered the heckler. Although relieved that he is not a murderer, Freeman panics over the growing body count, as Hitch robs local stores to pay off a debt to Monte Guy. Intimidated and unwilling to give up Hitch's connection to Monte Guy, Freeman agrees to keep quiet and continue his act.

While making out with Grail, Freeman discovers a dismembered body part in his car. Freaked out, he yells at Grail to leave, offending her. T-Bird sees her leave and confronts Freeman with a shotgun. T-Bird demands to see the car's trunk, where Hitch and Freeman have hiding the bodies. Freeman reluctantly opens the trunk, only for one of the victims, who was armed with a pistol, to shoot and kill T-Bird before dying. Unable to handle any more death or killing, Freeman convinces Hitch to drive into the desert with him and leaves him for dead. Freeman leaves a note apologizing to Grail for his behavior and confesses to the police. The man who he confesses to turns out not to be a cop but a talent scout for Monte Guy. The scout interprets the confession as a comedy routine and agrees to watch his next set at the club.

At the comedy club, Freeman attempts to distance himself from his previous performances, reverting to clean humor. It goes poorly, and he leaves the club to seek inspiration from the bodies in the car's trunk. When he finds it empty, he returns to his hotel room, where he finds Hitch, horribly sunburned and surrounded by the corpses. Hitch threatens to kill Grail, whom he has taken hostage, in retaliation for Freeman's betrayal, but Freeman kills Hitch. Grail, freaked out, shouts for help. Freeman panics, and, attempting to quiet her, puts a pillow over her head, forlornly insisting that she is supposed to love him. Freeman fantasizes that she expresses her love, and that the talent scout witnessed this as part of "performance art comedy" and drove them to Las Vegas where they married, and he becomes a star on Monte Guy's show. This is interrupted when the police arrive, finding Freeman laughing hysterically among the arranged bodies, arranged like the celebrity couch for Monte Guy.

== Cast ==
- Jim O'Heir as Lenny Freeman
- Andrew J. West as Hitch
- Josh McDermitt as T-Bird
- Anne Dudek as Grail
- Tracey Walter as Father Rickey
- Sal Richards as Monte Guy

== Release ==
Middle Man premiered at the Seattle International Film Festival on June 10, 2016.

== Reception ==
On Metacritic, a review aggregator, Middle Man has a rating of 37/100 based on four reviews. Though describing the film's central conceit as "a winner", Scott Tobias of Variety wrote that the film "only has one big joke, and everything around it is either long-winded setup or deflating letdown". John DeFore of The Hollywood Reporter called it "an unconvincing black comedy whose aspirations rival its deluded hero's". Katie Walsh of the Los Angeles Times wrote that the film depends too much on violence and gore at the expense of humor. Tom Keogh of The Seattle Times rated it 3/4 stars and described it as a film that initially seems to be a simple comedy but turns into a "deranged farce".

Middle Man won the Grand Jury Prize for New American Cinema at the Seattle International Film Festival.
