= Under the Dome season 3 =

Under the Dome
- Season 3
- Region 2 DVD cover
- No. of episodes: 13

Release
- Original network: CBS
- Original release: June 25 – September 10, 2015

Season chronology
- ← Previous; Season 2

The third and final season of Under the Dome, an American science fiction mystery drama television series, premiered on CBS on June 25, 2015, and ended on September 10, 2015.

Based on the novel of the same name written by Stephen King, Under the Dome tells the story of the residents of the fictional small town of Chester's Mill, when a massive, transparent, indestructible dome suddenly cuts them off from the rest of the world. Military forces, the government, and the media positioned outside the barrier attempt to break it down, while the residents trapped inside must find their own ways to survive with diminishing resources and rising tensions. A small group of people inside the dome must also unravel complicated mysteries in order to figure out what the dome is, where it came from, and when (and if) it will go away.

The season received mixed reviews.

After airing on Mondays for the first two seasons, the show moved to Thursdays at 10 p.m. ET for the third season, where it received an average of 0.96 in the 18–49 demographic and 4.70 million viewers over its 13-episode run.

== Season plot ==
In the third and final season of Under the Dome, the people of Chester's Mill decide to go through the way out of the Dome discovered in the previous season. What meets them is freedom, and they go on to live a year of their lives without the Dome - or so they think. Back inside the Dome, the few people remaining discover that someone they trusted isn't who they appeared to be, and as a result, they destroy the mysterious egg, which is the Dome's power source. Everyone outside the Dome is actually revealed to have been trapped in weird cocoons, and when the egg is destroyed, they escape from the cocoons to find out the year they lived was completely false; an alternate reality created by "The Kinship", an alien civilization. The Kinship takes over the minds and bodies of the townspeople, turning them into emotionless drones with a shared goal to take over Chester's Mill, and then the whole Earth, in order to evolve and spread their civilization after their home planet was destroyed. With only very few people not having entered the alternate reality and not having been cocooned, a war inside the Dome is set up between The Kinship and the Resistance. With the Dome's power source gone, it starts to calcify, severely limiting oxygen and posing a threat to both The Kinship and The Resistance. As the situation intensifies, the final few hours sees members of each group somewhat working together to find a way to make the Dome disappear, as well as killing the other group, in the final moments that have massive global consequences.

== Cast and characters ==
The cast members portray characters that were mostly taken from the original novel, "although some have been combined and others have changed jobs."

=== Main ===
- Mike Vogel as Dale 'Barbie' Barbara
- Rachelle Lefevre as Julia Shumway
- Alexander Koch as James 'Junior' Rennie
- Eddie Cahill as Sam Verdreaux
- Colin Ford as Joe McAlister
- Mackenzie Lintz as Norrie Calvert-Hill
- Kylie Bunbury as Eva Sinclair / Dawn Sinclair-Barbara
- Dean Norris as James 'Big Jim' Rennie

=== Recurring ===
- Aisha Hinds as Carolyn Hill
- John Elvis as Ben Drake
- Grace Victoria Cox as Melanie Cross
- Max Ehrich as Hunter May
- Brett Cullen as Don Barbara
- Marg Helgenberger as Christine Price
- Eriq La Salle as Hektor Martin
- Mike Whaley as Malick
- Bess Rous as Abby DeWitt
- Andrew J. West as Pete Blackwell
- Frank Whaley as Dr. Marston
- Tia Hendricks as Audrey Everett
- Gia Mantegna as Lily Walters
- Megan Ketch as Harriet Arnold
- Vince Foster as Kyle Lee

== Production ==
On October 9, 2014, the series was renewed for a third season. Tim Schlattmann joined the series as an executive producer for season three. According to producer Randy Sutter, filming for the third season began on March 11, 2015, and ended on August 8, 2015.

During a CBS press briefing in May 2015, showrunner and executive producer Neal Baer promised answers in the new season. "We will tell you why the dome came down and what it’s about", with new executive producer Tim Schlattman adding, "You’ll see how these puzzle pieces form a puzzle that may be different from what you thought it would be".

A month later, Baer provided some insight on the series as a whole, saying that each season has "an overarching philosophy". "The first year was faith, fear and fascism. The second year was faith vs. science. This year, it's the individual vs. the group, with the theme being the enemy within."

Following information from CBS entertainment chairman Nina Tassler in August 2015 that "The Dome is coming down at the end of this season”, speculation started that the third season would also be the final season, which CBS confirmed at the end of the month.

In an interview after the series finale aired on September 10, 2015, executive producer and showrunner Neal Baer said he was "very happy with this ending. I feel very satisfied. We made it so there could be another [season]… but it wasn’t necessary."

=== Casting ===
Marg Helgenberger guest stars in an extended arc beginning with the premiere. She plays a therapist named Christine Price who "has a big goal to unite the people of Chester's Mill and to teach the people in the community to live and make the most of their situation until they survive the ordeal."

Eriq La Salle, who directed an episode in the second season, is a guest star in season three. He plays Hektor Martin, the ruthless CEO of Aktaion Energy, the company run by Barbie's father, and also directed the ninth episode of the season.

== Episodes ==
No. overall	No. in season	Title	Directed by	Written by	Original release date	US viewers (millions)
27	1	"Move On"	Peter Leto	Adam Stein	June 25, 2015	6.25
Taking up where the previous season left off, inside the tunnel Barbie and the surviving townspeople follow Melanie into the white light. Then they magically appear not only outside the tunnel, but outside the dome which quickly shatters. Barbie runs back for Julia and finds Big Jim, Junior, and Julia dead. One year later Barbie is working in the Middle East as a mercenary with Hunter as his surveillance specialist. Barbie has a new girlfriend, Eva Sinclair. Norrie is in college and is pledging at a sorority. Her mother Carolyn is happy for her. Sam is in prison and going to AA meetings. Joe is living with his parents and having trouble adjusting. FEMA sent a therapist, Christine Price, to Chester's Mill to help the townspeople recover from the event and "move on" with their lives. Meanwhile back inside the dome, Big Jim, Junior, and Julia are squabbling as usual.
28	2	"But I'm Not"	Peter Weller	Tim Schlattmann	June 25, 2015	6.25
Julia and Junior determine that they need to cross the crevice in the tunnel and see what is on the other side. After doing so, Junior crosses into the light and becomes part of the alternate world, and sees what his life is like without his father. Barbie gradually becomes aware that they are in an alternate reality. Barbie's father convinces his superiors that he should take the egg back to Chester's Mill. After he does so, he is met and strangled by Melanie, who then takes the egg to the tunnel. Julia sees that all of the townspeople are really within pods that are connected together. Melanie attaches the egg to the main central pod, which is somewhat larger than the others, and it begins to emit a pulse of pink energy, flowing towards the other interconnected pods. Big Jim arrives on the scene and destroys the pulsating egg. The townspeople emerge from their respective pods, and Eva Sinclair and Christine Price are among them.
29	3	"Redux"	Olatunde Osunsanmi	Alexandra McNally	July 2, 2015	5.28
The townspeople return to the surface and resume their lives, still under the dome. Junior is particularly upset by returning to life under the dome, and decides to stand up to Big Jim by setting fire to their family home. Julia presses Barbie for details about his relationship with Eva while in the pod. Barbie is initially reluctant to discuss it but eventually opens up because the whole thing was imaginary. People begin to notice that they have changed somewhat after emerging from the pods. Christine and Eva begin to discuss their mission, and how the Egg was preparing the townspeople before the process was interrupted. Eva also wonders whether she is pregnant by Barbie. Melanie's usefulness is done and she is killed by Christine. Frustrated, Big Jim decides to leave to the island on the rowboat. Julia and Barbie spot Eva, who is real after all. Christine starts a counseling practice and recruits Sam to assist.
30	4	"The Kinship"	Ed Ornelas	Cathryn Humphris	July 9, 2015	5.12
Big Jim is captured and questioned by Aktaion agents. Food becomes scarce in Chester's Mill, and Barbie and Eva go out and locate three silos full of cattle feed, which can be turned into something edible. Julia becomes suspicious of Christine when she lies about her badge, which came from Aktaion. The townspeople start to revert to their original selves, and Christine tells Joe about the importance of keeping the "kinship" intact. Julia accuses Barbie of cheating on her with Eva, which upsets him and causes him to leave. Eva learns that she is not in fact pregnant. Christine takes Junior to the tunnels and spreads some of the material/slime from the main pod onto his lips, then seduces him. Julia joins up with Big Jim and helps him flee from an Aktaion operative chasing him.
31	5	"Alaska"	David M. Barrett	Bronwyn Garrity	July 16, 2015	4.75
Big Jim and Julia learn some information about the egg from Dr. Marston, an Aktaion scientist. Hunter falls off a roof while trying to force Norrie to return to work, resulting in his legs becoming paralyzed. He later blames Norrie, causing Junior and some of the townspeople to become angry at both Joe and Norrie. Sam finds Abby dead after Christine has given her some pills. Barbie saves both Eva and himself by killing Pete after the latter is tricked by Christine into believing Barbie is a threat. Big Jim saves his dog, Indy, from Aktaion agents by telling them the truth about the egg and Dr. Marston then tells him that he will be used as the control and Christine will be used as the experiment.
32	6	"Caged"	Sergio Mimica-Gezzan	Andres Fischer-Centeno	July 23, 2015	4.63
Joe and Norrie learn about the infected town's new rules. They also find out that Carolyn is infected. Julia is kidnapped by Junior until Joe and Norrie rescue her. Barbie and Junior rescue Christine from Aktaion agents while Big Jim kills Dr. Marston and runs into the woods. Joe and Norrie later rescue Hunter and due to Christine killing Abby, Sam stabs her, but the wound is non-fatal. Big Jim walks around the woods searching for his dog, Indy, and finds Julia, so they both team up and walk together in search for Indy knowing that most of the town is infected.
33	7	"Ejecta"	David M. Barrett	Peter Calloway	July 30, 2015	4.68
The residents of Chester's Mill watch on helplessly as the world around the Dome is struck by a meteor shower and the resultant ejecta. Barbie and Eva deal with members of the Kinship attempting to jump from a building due to Christine's absence, and Barbie suggests to Eva that they send a signal from Bird Island to bring any survivors inside the Dome. At the diner, Joe and Norrie help Hunter return to his old self when they learn emotions can help fight against the Kinship. Meanwhile, Big Jim and Julia bond and get drunk at the Aktaion house on Bird Island and discuss their regrets and the end of the world. Junior lures Sam into the caves by telling him about Christine and pretending not to know Sam attacked her. He then attacks Sam once they are inside. Christine later starts to emerge from her cocoon. Barbie despairs as he watches from the Dome wall while survivors outside are enveloped by the firestorm. Eva tells him to forget about them, and she convinces him to join the Kinship. Joe, Norrie, and Hunter join Big Jim and Julia and form a resistance. A voice is heard from the computer inside the house indicating not everyone outside the dome has perished.
34	8	"Breaking Point"	Sam Hill	James C. Oliver & Sharla Oliver	August 6, 2015	3.88
The destruction seen outside the Dome turns out to be an illusion. Christine convinces the townspeople to begin mining the remaining crystals powering the Dome and bring them to the surface where they will be more effective. Hunter and Big Jim communicate with Aktaion via the computer and offer to exchange Dr. Marston for a load of explosives. Big Jim places the explosives near the crystals. Barbie finds them and warns the townspeople to evacuate the mine, but they explode, and Norrie's mother, Carolyn, is trapped and apparently killed. Now lacking power, the Dome begins to calcify which will eventually cause the townspeople to suffocate.
35	9	"Plan B"	Eriq La Salle	Tim Schlattmann & Mark Linehan Bruner	August 13, 2015	3.73
The Resistance escapes to Reverend Coggins' funeral home after the Kinship invades the Aktaion house. Joe and Norrie are chased by the Kinship at the library, but Sam saves them and is presumably on their side. Julia and Big Jim capture and interrogate Barbie, hoping they can snap him out of it. When it does not work, Big Jim attacks Eva and the Kinship, but after a brief struggle, he escapes. Back at the funeral home, Sam knocks Joe out and takes him back to City Hall revealing Sam is still part of the Kinship. Julia confronts Barbie alone at gunpoint threatening to shoot him. However, Julia expresses her love for Barbie, which snaps him out of it, and they kiss.
36	10	"Legacy"	Dennie Gordon	Alexandra McNally & Andres Fischer-Centeno	August 20, 2015	4.04
After Barbie and Julia share a romantic kiss together, they make plans to get the town out of the Kinship. Big Jim, Norrie, and Hunter fight off the Kinship and get rescued by Hector who had just gotten inside the Dome alongside his Aktaion crew. Barbie finds Junior punching Joe at the town hall and tells Junior to leave. Barbie tells Joe that Julia freed him from the Kinship and Joe decided to stay and help plan on bringing down the Dome. Julia and Indy meet up with the Resistance and the Aktaion crew. After being threatened by Hektor, Big Jim begins to fear that Hektor will end up betraying them. Julia finds the dead bodies of several young women until Harriet finds her. Norrie shoots Harriet through the head, and they both watch as Barbie holds hands and kisses Eva.
37	11	"Love is a Battlefield"	Lee Rose	Peter Calloway & Adam Stein	August 27, 2015	4.60
Joe continues his research into using sound to bring down the Dome. He learns the crystals respond when people whistle the tune, but not when a recording of it is played. He splits the remaining big crystal into seven pieces. The Aktaion team develops a possible cure for the infection that is tested on Junior. Eva has the baby. After Eva's usefulness is done, she is killed by Christine who takes the baby. Big Jim agrees with Hektor when he says killing the infected townspeople is the only way to stop the Kinship. Joe wonders what will happen if the Dome comes down while the townspeople are still infected and led by their new Queen.
38	12	"Incandescence"	PJ Pesce	Bronwyn Garrity & Cathryn Humphris	September 3, 2015	3.70
Barbie and Julia return to the Resistance, where they inform them of Barbie's daughter being part of the Kinship. Dr. Bloom insists on them getting the baby's umbilical cord to create a new cure for the infected townspeople. Junior returns to Christine, who has placed Barbie's daughter in a cocoon and has started the process of turning her into the new queen. After Barbie and Julia give the umbilical cord to Big Jim, they interrupt the transfer process, and a shadow figure escapes the cocoon and turns Christine into a normal person again. She takes them to the lake where they manage to stop Junior from going through with Christine's initial plan to sacrifice the kids. Hektor, adamant that the cure will not work, kills Dr. Bloom, ties Lily up, and goes to kill Joe. He is about to kill Joe and Norrie, but Big Jim intervenes and kills Hektor. Dawn, Barbie's now grown-up daughter, kills Christine and declares herself the new queen.
39	13	"The Enemy Within"	Peter Leto	Neal Baer & Tim Schlattmann	September 10, 2015	4.23
Sam advises Dawn that there are tunnels at the cement factory that lead out of town. Jealous of his position in the Kinship, Junior seeks to reclaim his position by killing Sam. The crystals are in place and the transmitter is ready. Dawn activates the crystals, but the egg is required and is not available. Dawn tells Norrie that she can act as the egg since she is a Hand. Joe takes Norrie's place and the Dome comes down. Junior attacks Big Jim, who is forced to kill his own son. Dawn apparently falls to her death at the cement factory. Everyone is required to sign a statement that Hektor and Aktaion were responsible. Big Jim offers to fully sell the story if he is compensated "fairly". One year later, Barbie is about to propose to Julia when they are taken to the office of Big Jim, who is now a Congressman. Hunter (who is now working for the NSA) has located Dawn in Omaha. Norrie (who has enlisted in the Army) finds Joe in a secure facility. Dawn stops three children before they touch a different egg.

== Reception ==
=== Critical reception ===
The third season received mixed reviews. Positive reviews included Ken Tucker of Yahoo!, who wrote that "Under the Dome is certainly broadcast television’s most enjoyable science-fiction/fantasy series, a summer treat that, while sometimes silly and over-the-top, is never less than energetically imaginative and aware of the history of its genre", Scott Von Doviak of The A.V. Club, who wrote that "this show is always more fun when it leans into its sci-fi elements", and Paul Dailly of TV Fanatic, who wrote that "All things considered, this was a solid, if unspectacular return for the show". Negative reviews included Kevin Yeoman of ScreenRant, who wrote that "There is a certain joy that comes from watching something as consistently moronic as Under the Dome", and Tim Surette of TV.com, who wrote that "it takes balls to think your audience is so dumb and brain dead that you feel the need to explain the big twist in the episode that's about to happen before the episode even begins".

=== Ratings ===
Viewership and ratings per episode of Under the Dome season 3
No.	Title	Air date	Rating/share (18–49)	Viewers (millions)
1	"Move On"	June 25, 2015	1.3/5	6.25
2	"But I'm Not"	June 25, 2015	1.3/5	6.25
3	"Redux"	July 2, 2015	1.0/4	5.28
4	"The Kinship"	July 9, 2015	1.1/3	5.12
5	"Alaska"	July 16, 2015	0.9/3	4.75
6	"Caged"	July 23, 2015	1.0/4	4.63
7	"Ejecta"	July 30, 2015	1.0/4	4.68
8	"Breaking Point"	August 6, 2015	0.8/3	3.88
9	"Plan B"	August 13, 2015	0.8/3	3.73
10	"Legacy"	August 20, 2015	0.8/3	4.04
11	"Love is a Battlefield"	August 27, 2015	0.9/3	4.60
12	"Incandescence"	September 3, 2015	0.8/3	3.70
13	"The Enemy Within"	September 10, 2015	0.8/3	4.23
