= Infest =

Infest may refer to:

- Infest, wild animal overpopulation, much in the same way that cockroaches do
- Infest (album), a 2000 hard rock album by Papa Roach
- Infest (band), American hardcore band
- Infest (festival), an alternative electronic music festival in Bradford, UK since 1998

== Related terms ==
- Infested (disambiguation)
- Infestation (disambiguation)
- Overpopulation (animals)
