= Walter (2015 film) =

- Directed by: Anna Mastro
- Written by: Paul Shoulberg
- Produced by: Ryan Harris; Brenden Patrick Hill; Mark Holder
- Starring: Andrew J. West; Virginia Madsen; Milo Ventimiglia; Leven Rambin; Neve Campbell; William H. Macy; Justin Kirk
- Cinematography: Steven Capitano Calitri
- Edited by: Kristin McCasey
- Music by: Dan Romer
- Production companies: Demarest Films; Zero Gravity Management; Barry Films; Purple Bench Films; Live Through the Heart; Future Films
- Distributed by: Entertainment One
- Release date: March 13, 2015
- Running time: 87 minutes
- Country: United States
- Language: English
- Budget: $700,000

Walter is a 2015 American comedy-drama film directed by Anna Mastro and starring Andrew J. West, Virginia Madsen, Milo Ventimiglia, Leven Rambin, Neve Campbell, William H. Macy, and Justin Kirk. It was released on March 13, 2015. The film is based on writer Paul Shoulberg's short film.

== Plot ==
Walter Gary Benjamin (Andrew J. West) works as a ticket-tearer at the local cineplex. When Walter was ten years old, he made a deal with God to judge the eternal fate of everyone he comes in contact with, in exchange for allowing his father to go to Heaven. Walter manages his daily routine and his worrisome mother until the mysterious ghost Gregory Douglas Tomlinson (Justin Kirk) shows up and forces Walter to confront the meaning of his life and his future.

== Cast ==
- Andrew J. West as Walter Gary Benjamin
- Justin Kirk as Gregory Douglas Tomlinson
- Leven Rambin as Kendall
- Virginia Madsen as Karen Benjamin
- Neve Campbell as Allie
- William H. Macy as Dr. Donald Corman
- Milo Ventimiglia as Vince
- Peter Facinelli as Jim Benjamin
- Jim Gaffigan as Corey
- Brian J. White as Darren
