= Under the Dome season 2 =

Under the Dome
- Season 2
- Region 2 DVD cover
- No. of episodes: 13

Release
- Original network: CBS
- Original release: June 30 – September 22, 2014

Season chronology
- ← Previous; Season 1 Next → Season 3

The second season of Under the Dome, an American science fiction mystery drama television series, premiered on CBS on June 30, 2014, and ended on September 22, 2014.

Based on the novel of the same name written by Stephen King, Under the Dome tells the story of the residents of the fictional small town of Chester's Mill, when a massive, transparent, indestructible dome suddenly cuts them off from the rest of the world. Military forces, the government, and the media positioned outside the barrier attempt to break it down, while the residents trapped inside must find their own ways to survive with diminishing resources and rising tensions. A small group of people inside the dome must also unravel complicated mysteries in order to figure out what the dome is, where it came from, and when (and if) it will go away.

The second season has a score of 52/100, based on nine reviews, indicating "mixed or average" reviews, on review aggregator website Metacritic. The season has a score of 61/100, based on 18 reviews, on film and TV review aggregator Rotten Tomatoes; the site's critical consensus for the season reads: "Though it reins in some of the first season's absurdity and shows potential for improvement, Under the Dome's second season still feels like a ride with no closure."

Like the first season, season two aired in the United States on Mondays at 10:00 pm ET, where it received an average of 1.6/5 in the 18–49 demographic and 7.17 million viewers over its 13-episode run.

== Season plot ==
In the second season of Under the Dome, the people of Chester's Mill face new disasters on a daily basis. The town councilman, last season's de facto dictator, tries to keep the town under his control, but struggles to keep the trust of the people when someone disobeys his authority with better alternatives for surviving. A new girl mysteriously appears in the town, and her past holds major clues to the Dome's origins. The mysterious egg, which is considered the Dome's power source, is still somewhere in town, it gradually gives more answers, so it must be protected. Somebody has found a way out of the Dome, and is taken to Zenith, another town close to Chester's Mill, where he uncovers that a private company has been researching the Dome, but with possibly nefarious motivations. As the townspeople face the ultimate threat to their lives, they must decide whether to follow the route out from the Dome, not knowing exactly what awaits them outside if they do.

== Cast and characters ==
The cast members portray characters that were mostly taken from the original novel, "although some have been combined and others have changed jobs."

=== Main ===
- Mike Vogel as Dale 'Barbie' Barbara
- Rachelle Lefevre as Julia Shumway
- Natalie Martinez as Linda Esquivel
- Britt Robertson as Angie McAlister (Note: Britt Robertson is credited as "Starring" in the first episode, but credited as "Guest starring" in the tenth episode.)
- Alexander Koch as James 'Junior' Rennie
- Eddie Cahill as Sam Verdreaux
- Colin Ford as Joe McAlister
- Nicholas Strong as Phil Bushey
- Mackenzie Lintz as Norrie Calvert-Hill
- Karla Crome as Rebecca Pine
- Dean Norris as James 'Big Jim' Rennie

=== Recurring ===
- Aisha Hinds as Carolyn Hill
- Jolene Purdy as Dodee Weaver
- Grace Victoria Cox as Melanie Cross
- John Elvis as Ben Drake
- Dale Raoul as Andrea Grinnell
- R. Keith Harris as Peter Shumway
- Megan Ketch as Harriet Arnold
- Sherry Stringfield as Pauline Rennie
- Dwight Yoakam as Lyle Chumley
- Estes Tarver as Tom Tilden
- Tia Hendricks as Audrey Everett
- Brett Cullen as Don Barbara
- Max Ehrich as Hunter May
- Mike Whaley as Malick

== Production ==
On July 29, 2013, Under the Dome was renewed for a 13-episode second season, with executive producer and Under the Dome novel writer Stephen King announced to be writing the second-season premiere episode.

Brian K. Vaughan exited the series before the premiere of season two, citing personal reasons. However, he had helped plan the second season with Neal Baer and King before he left.

Stephen King made a cameo appearance in the season premiere, as a customer in the Sweetbriar Rose diner.

== Episodes ==
No. overall	No. in season	Title	Directed by	Written by	Original release date	US viewers (millions)
14	1	"Heads Will Roll"	Jack Bender	Stephen King	June 30, 2014	9.41
Barbie's fate is left in the hands of Big Jim and Junior, after being falsely charged with numerous crimes. However, the dome releases a sound, which causes Linda to halt the execution. The dome has become magnetized, causing observers to pass out. Linda is killed from being crushed against the dome's wall by a vehicle. Meanwhile, Julia meets Sam Verdreaux, while rescuing a mysterious girl from drowning. To save the rest of the townspeople, Barbie meets Rebecca Pine, a high school science teacher who has theories about the dome. Big Jim thinks the dome is telling him to sacrifice himself, and he asks Julia and Barbie for assistance. Julia refuses to follow through, and she prevents Big Jim's death by cutting the rope. The townspeople begin to wake up. Later that night, Angie sees the girl who was rescued and follows her to the school, where she is seen looking into a locker. Angie looks to see what is inside, but is killed by an unseen assailant.
15	2	"Infestation"	Ernest Dickerson	Kelly Souders & Brian Peterson	July 7, 2014	7.70
Having been spared by the dome, Big Jim starts to have a change of heart, and becomes less selfish and genuinely helpful towards the entire town. Rebecca takes action after a caterpillar infestation begins to take control of all the town's crops, by burning fields, and enlisting Big Jim and Barbie to spray the fields with pesticides. The fuel runs low on the airplane, however, Big Jim helps Barbie by revealing a secret reserve tank. Following Angie's murder, there is a manhunt for the person responsible for the crime. Initially, the girl who was rescued by Julia is the main suspect, as her shoe print was found near the crime scene, however it is soon revealed that it was a man who did the deed. Junior heads to the prison cell to kill the mysterious stranger, before being stopped. Junior then heads to his Uncle Sam's shack to reveal that the previous night, he was drunk, and he believes that he may have been the man who killed Angie.
16	3	"Force Majeure"	Peter Leto	Adam Stein	July 14, 2014	7.64
Rebecca and Big Jim decide to conduct a census on the town to decide how to apportion resources. Chester's Mill is faced with red acid rain and all are forced to stay indoors. At the school, Joe, Norrie and the unknown girl detect a short-lived internet connection. Junior receives a message from his mother telling him that she is alive and to trust only the town's barber, Lyle. Rebecca and Big Jim are going to the school to test a sample of the rain when they are attacked by Lyle. Lyle tortures Rebecca to try to make her agree that they must accept their fate. Barbie, Sam and Julia save Big Jim, and then set out to find Rebecca. Meanwhile Joe, Norrie and the unknown girl open the locker that Angie closed just before dying, they find nothing. They later come across a photo of the unknown girl during the 1980s and find that her name is Melanie. Junior demands answers from Lyle, who tells him that in time he will have all his answers.
17	4	"Revelation"	Holly Dale	Alexandra McNally	July 21, 2014	6.74
With Big Jim on board, Rebecca pushes ahead with the plan to reduce the population. Rebecca discovers a pig that died from the flu and gets blood from the carcass. Liking the idea of using natural selection and letting the virus do the work, Big Jim heads to the diner to contaminate some water. Julia connects the deaths to Rebecca's plans and believes that the diner will be the contamination point. They go there and stop Big Jim but he doesn't have the virus. Rebecca didn't trust him and she takes the virus to the church. Both Big Jim and Rebecca are locked up in jail. Lyle shows Junior postcards he had received from Pauline since helping her fake her death. They go to Sam's cabin looking for Pauline's journal. When Barbie finds Joe, Norrie, and Melanie, they tell him about the internet at the school. They all begin looking through old newspapers and find an article about Melanie Cross' disappearance. In 1988 she, Pauline, Lyle, and Sam found a meteorite with the egg. Melanie was pushed and killed.
18	5	"Reconciliation"	Ed Ornelas	Cathryn Humphris	July 28, 2014	6.57
As Julia is explaining the trial of Big Jim and Rebecca, one of the men in the crowd pulls out a gun. Phil shoots and kills the man, before heading to the cell block to free Big Jim and Rebecca, but Big Jim tells him that the town would kill him if he were released. Julia organizes a food program, but the storehouse is burned in an explosion. Junior tells Sam about the four hands, and believing that if all four hands are dead the Dome will come down, Sam almost smothers Junior, but stops when Junior wakes and tells him he loves him and that Uncle Sam is the only family he has left. Carolyn, Norrie's mother, finds a back store room where Phil hid the food and he attempts to kill her, but Barbie shoots him in the shoulder. In addition to the hidden storeroom food, Andrea, the widow of a survivalist, shows Julia her massive food supply which should last the town for months. At the diner Julia announces that they must forgive the past and frees Big Jim and Rebecca. Junior, Rebecca, and Sam find a mysterious tunnel leading from Melanie's old school locker.
19	6	"In the Dark"	Jack Bender	Caitlin Parrish	August 4, 2014	6.83
Barbie and Sam investigate the tunnel behind the school locker, but an explosion causes a cave-in and cuts them off from Junior. Meanwhile, a dust storm brought on by the acidity of the red rain overtakes the town. Julia helps Barbie rather than focusing on the weather crisis, while Big Jim regains the townspeople's support. He eventually convinces the people to build a mist-dispersing windmill, which calms the dust storm. Below ground, Barbie and Sam explore a cave system, eventually reaching a chasm, which they reason must lie outside the dome's boundaries. The two reminisce about the past, and Barbie sees the scratches on Sam's shoulder and realizes Sam murdered Angie. He warns Barbie that the dome will fall when the four hands are dead, and leaps into the chasm. Julia and Rebecca blast through the cave-in, rescuing Barbie. Meanwhile, Joe, Norrie, Melanie and Junior hide from Lyle, and recover the egg from the lake. The stars take on a shape of an obelisk standing in Melanie's hometown, Zenith.
20	7	"Going Home"	David Barrett	Peter Calloway	August 11, 2014	6.90
Barbie awakens in Zenith after falling from the cliff edge under the school in an effort to recover Sam's body. He returns to his apartment for some money and is confronted by armed men from his past, who demand that he complete a job he didn't finish. He leads one of them to the target, his father's home, but subdues the man and reunites with Don, his father. Meanwhile, Big Jim decides to hold a memorial service for Barbie at the diner when he learns from Rebecca that he had died and invites the townspeople. Now in Zenith, Sam reunites with Pauline and tells her about his experience in Chester's Mill, and learns her reason for faking her death, and that Lyle is alive, but unresponsive. Julia decides to return to the cliff edge with Joe, Norrie, and Melanie and watches on as Joe flies a drone down the cliff edge. The drone disappears, and they discover an image of a playground and an obelisk on the drone's video, making them believe that Barbie may be alive. Barbie learns about the dome situation, and then convinces his father to help him return to it.
21	8	"Awakening"	Jack Bender	Andres Fischer-Centeno & Daniel Truly	August 18, 2014	7.30
Barbie decides to enlist the help of his father to send a message to Julia, but his father has the message altered. Julia receives the message but believes it may not be from Barbie. After discussing the message with Joe, Norrie and Melanie, she decides to respond in a way that only Barbie understands. In Zenith, Barbie is told that his father had doctored the message to Julia. Believing that his father's computer may have answers, Barbie breaks into it with the help of Hunter, one of his father's employees, and discovers the truth. At his father's company, Aktaion Energy, Barbie sends a cryptic message to Julia telling her that he's alive. He tells her to meet her at the dome edge. With Hunter's help, Barbie assumes a false identity of an Aktaion Energy employee and makes his way through the checkpoints to the dome. Meanwhile, Sam and Pauline talk with Lyle and tells the two men about the red door. That night, Barbie reunites with Julia at the dome wall and gives her a message. She watches as armed men capture him.
22	9	"The Red Door"	Peter Weller	Kelly Souders & Brian Peterson & Adam Stein	August 25, 2014	6.60
Barbie is interrogated by a private company hired by Don Barbara's company Aktaion Energy and is asked about the egg. Don decides to send a message to Julia and threatens Barbie's safety should she not hand the egg over. Barbie is able to escape by knocking out a guard and makes his way to the Hounds of Diana headquarters and reunites with Sam, Lyle, Hunter and Pauline. After Barbie reveals that Sam killed Angie, Sam and Pauline talk, but she blames herself for his actions. Back at Chester's Mill, Big Jim decides to make a deal with a guard at the Dome wall that guarantees safe passage to Zenith for Junior and himself in exchange for the egg. The group decide to return to Barbie's former home and discover the red door that they believe can return them to Chester's Mill. They make their way inside the root cellar and are each enveloped by mist and experience a vision from their past. They awaken in a lake in Chester's Mill, and Pauline decides to return home and meets Big Jim.
23	10	"The Fall"	Eriq La Salle	Alexandra McNally & Mark Linehan Bruner	September 1, 2014	6.29
Big Jim is still shocked and dumbfounded to find Pauline alive and is angered when she explains that she faked her death. Barbie and Julia prepare the residents for an evacuation and discuss the situation in Zenith. Julia believes she should go first and negotiate for safe passage, but Barbie believes it to be unsafe. They are unaware that Big Jim had met with the men at the dome's edge and has his own deal set up. Barbie discusses his vision while returning to Chester's Mill, that of him as a boy and a red door; he realizes Melanie is his sister. Junior brutally attacks Sam for killing Angie, but is convinced by Angie's apparition to spare Sam's life. Melanie decides to hide the egg in Big Jim's bunker with Junior's help. When the egg emits a high pitched scream, Pauline is faced with crippling headaches. Big Jim locks her inside the house, and when he tells Joe and Norrie of the effect the egg is having on Pauline, he forces them to throw it over the cliff edge. Big Jim returns home and learns Pauline's headaches have stopped, but she is disappointed with what he has done with the egg.
24	11	"Black Ice"	Jack Bender	Adam Stein & Peter Calloway	September 8, 2014	6.62
The dome begins to rotate, which shifts colder air down, sending Chester's Mill into a deep freeze. The townspeople take shelter in the school to stay warm, and Rebecca and Sam tend to the ill. Barbie and Julia are in an ambulance on the way to pick up food when the vehicle overturns, resulting in a piece of metal lodging in Julia's leg. After becoming unconscious due to the extreme cold, Barbie carries her back to town and manages to revive her just in time. Big Jim heads down to the dock to look for fuel for the heating generator, when he stumbles upon Lyle in the lake, and rescues him. The dome rotates back by the next morning, and the temperature starts to moderate again. Joe and Norrie grow suspicious of Hunter and follow him to the dome's edge, where they see him communicating via written messages with the head guard. The two teens confront Hunter afterwards, who explains that he was giving the guard false information so that the men will leave Chester's Mill alone. The dome then starts contracting inward.
25	12	"Turn"	Peter Leto	William Kendall & Daniel Truly	September 15, 2014	7.04
The dome continues to slowly contract, causing more damage. Junior and Lyle review Pauline's notebook, looking for any clues that might be helpful. Melanie's condition continues to worsen and Rebecca gives her a blood transfusion. Barbie takes Hunter to the edge of the dome and talks to his father, convincing him that Melanie is alive within the dome and the only way to save her is for him to return the egg to Chester's Mill. When Barbie's father tries to take the egg to the red door, the men in black stop him, saying they have orders. Big Jim encourages Pauline to paint, even though her visions have stopped. To save Melanie, all seven hands touch her but nothing happens. Rebecca realizes that Melanie counts as two hands, representing the past and the present. When Sam and Junior hold both of her hands, she recovers, but the ground opens up and Melanie is sucked into a hole. Pauline is distraught but Big Jim tells her she was only trying to help. However, Lyle stabs her in the back, and Big Jim stabs him in a fit of rage.
26	13	"Go Now"	Jack Bender	Caitlin Parrish & Cathryn Humphris	September 22, 2014	7.52
Barbie and the others wonder how to explore the crater. Joe, Norrie and Hunter go down into the crater and explore the cave, reporting their findings to Barbie, and the townspeople start heading toward the crater. Sam determines that Pauline will die unless she gets surgery. While Pauline is alone with Rebecca, she begs to be given a morphine overdose. Rebecca does so and Pauline dies. Big Jim sees Rebecca with the morphine needle so he kills her. He speaks to the dome, demanding it bring Pauline back to life or he will kill the dome's hands. Julia is called away from the crater, lured by Big Jim who has taken Andrea prisoner. Big Jim kills Andrea and attacks Julia, but she stabs him in the foot and runs, meeting Junior and Sam in the woods. Junior confronts Big Jim and shoots him in the shoulder. He runs to the crater, leaving his father in Chester's Mill. Barbie crosses a crevice in the cave, but Julia is unable to follow when the crevice widens. Barbie goes ahead and catches up to the townspeople, and they end up at a wall. Barbie touches the rock and it crumbles, revealing Melanie.

== Reception ==
=== Critical reception ===
The second season has a score of 52/100, based on nine reviews, indicating "mixed or average" reviews, on review aggregator website Metacritic. The season has a score of 61/100, based on 18 reviews, on film and TV review aggregator Rotten Tomatoes; the site's critical consensus for the season reads: "Though it reins in some of the first season's absurdity and shows potential for improvement, Under the Dome's second season still feels like a ride with no closure."

Negative reviews included Hank Stuever of The Washington Post, who wrote that "I just don’t buy Under the Dome, on any level. I think the story is a shambles and the concept is dumb", and Verne Gay of Newsday, who wrote "Under the dumb". However, other critics were more positive; Mark Dawidziak of The Plain Dealer wrote that "If not top-tier TV terror fare, Under the Dome certainly is solid second-level stuff. And given the state of horror on television these days, that's a bloody good compliment. Even while acknowledging the occasional misstep, give Under the Dome credit for getting a lot of things right", while Sarah Rodman of The Boston Globe wrote that "there are glimmers of hope for season two".

=== Ratings ===
Viewership and ratings per episode of Under the Dome season 2
No.	Title	Air date	Rating/share (18–49)	Viewers (millions)
1	"Heads Will Roll"	June 30, 2014	2.1/7	9.41
2	"Infestion"	July 7, 2014	1.7/5	7.70
3	"Force Majeure"	July 14, 2014	1.9/6	7.64
4	"Revelation"	July 21, 2014	1.6/5	6.74
5	"Reconciliation"	July 28, 2014	1.5/5	6.57
6	"In the Dark"	August 4, 2014	1.6/5	6.83
7	"Going Home"	August 11, 2014	1.5/5	6.59
8	"Awakening"	August 18, 2014	1.5/5	7.30
9	"The Red Door"	August 25, 2014	1.4/4	6.60
10	"The Fall"	September 1, 2014	1.2/4	6.29
11	"Black Ice"	September 8, 2014	1.4/4	6.62
12	"Turn"	September 15, 2014	1.6/5	7.04
13	"Go Now"	September 22, 2014	1.8/5	7.52
