= The Eighth Witch =

- Once Upon a Time episode
- Episode no.: Season 7 Episode 10
- Directed by: Ralph Hemecker
- Written by: Jane Espenson; Jerome Schwartz

Guest appearances
- Adelaide Kane as Drizella/Ivy Belfrey; Emma Booth as Eloise Gardener/Gothel; Nathan Parsons as Jack/Nick Branson; Rebecca Mader as Zelena/Kelly West; Rose Reynolds as Alice/Tilly; Sara Tomko as Tiger Lily; Tiera Skovbye as Robin Hood; Yael Yurman as Anastasia; Nisreen Slim as Doctor Andrea/Sage/Hedge Witch

Episode chronology
← Previous "One Little Tear"	Next → "Secret Garden"
- Once Upon a Time season 7

"The Eighth Witch" is the tenth episode of the seventh season and the 143rd episode overall of the American fantasy-drama series Once Upon a Time. Written by Jane Espenson and Jerome Schwartz and directed by Ralph Hemecker, it premiered on ABC in the United States on December 15, 2017.

In this episode, which served as the mid-season finale, Lucy's life hangs in the balance as Henry and Regina travel to San Francisco to bring back a former resident whom Regina is very familiar with, while Eloise and Ivy are ready to welcome Anastasia to the new world but Weaver and Victoria are about to find out the consequences, and Rogers and Tilly track down a mysterious symbol that is tied into Lucy and Anastasia's connection. In the past the aforementioned events served as the catalyst of how the new curse began with a surprising twist and an unexpected sacrifice.

The episode marks the return of former series regular Rebecca Mader as Zelena, who returned in a recurring capacity to conclude her character's storyline.

== Plot ==
=== Opening sequence ===
The Transamerica Pyramid in San Francisco is featured in the background.

=== In the Characters' Past ===
In the New Realm, everyone gathers to help Henry celebrate the birth of his daughter Lucy. But Drizella shows up to dampen the festivities by warning them of a new curse that she will cast on Lucy’s eighth birthday. However, she is suddenly frozen in stone by Tremaine with the use of Blood Magic.

Eight years later the prophecy comes true. Everyone gathers for Lucy's birthday, but they are interrupted by the arrival of Gothel, who not only restores Drizella to life, but brings along a group of cloaked witches. Before leaving with Drizella, Gothel warns them that the Dark Curse is coming soon. Henry and Ella come up with a plan to protect Lucy from the curse while Regina tries to find a way to prevent it from being cast.

In another realm, Regina tracks down her sister Zelena and gets a greeting from Robin, now twenty-five and a skilled archer. When Regina warns Zelena of this new threat, she agrees to help. Zelena tells Regina that Gothel and her fellow witches are part of a group known as the Coven of the Eight, who are more powerful than expected. Meanwhile, Hook tracks down Rumpelstiltskin, who has given up his life as Mr. Gold after Belle's death. Rumple tells Hook that he can't stop the new curse, but he gives Hook a white elephant carving that will ensure that Hook and Alice will be together under the curse.

The event that was shown as a flashforward during The Final Battle is revealed; Henry and Ella agree to send Lucy to the New World using the same plan that Snow White and Prince Charming used to send Emma to the Land without Magic before the curse consumed them. Henry returns to the Enchanted Forest with Lucy to coordinate with Tiger Lily about building a magic wardrobe for Lucy. However, it appears that something followed Henry to the realm. Before he is captured, he gives Lucy the storybook and tells her to run. Instead of going to the tree, Lucy returns to the palace to tell Ella that Henry was kidnapped by the Coven of Eight.

Drizella has already set a scheme to make her mother believe she had cast the curse in order to help bring Anastasia back to life and casts a spell that causes Tremaine to collapse. Regina and Zelena return to discover that Drizella had poisoned Henry, and that the only way to save him is to send him to a land without magic. Drizella needs Regina’s blood to cast the curse. With Henry's life on the line, Regina casts the Dark Curse, which consumes the entire realm.

Before they're engulfed in the black smoke, Rumple gives Alice the chipped cup that will regain his memories and reminds her of what to do if it doesn't work. Robin embraces and kisses Alice, thus revealing the true love she had alluded to. Hook gives Ella the White Elephant so she and Lucy can be together, thus sacrificing his chance to reunite with Alice.

=== In Seattle ===
==== After Henry's Departure ====
Jacinda rushes Lucy to the hospital after her collapse. The tear that Victoria used on Anastasia caused Lucy to slip into a coma, thus rendering her ability to being a true believer. Sabine offers to help Jacinda by calling everyone to fill them in on Lucy's condition and she says she'll ask Rogers if he can find out where Lucy was in the hours prior to her collapse.

==== After Henry's return ====
Prior to the sister's reunion, Henry learned of Lucy's coma, so he returned to Seattle to find out what he can do. Jacinda suggests that he read the storybook to Lucy in the hope that he can give Lucy the belief that maybe he is her father and he can save her with true love's kiss, but when he kissed her forehead, nothing happened. After Henry called Regina regarding Lucy, Regina tells Zelena the only way to break the curse could have consequences and implications. If she doesn't break the curse, Lucy will likely die. However, if she does break the curse, Henry will die. Both sisters now must find a way to restore their powers in order to save them.

With Anastasia alive again, Victoria is trying to get her to assimilate to the new world. However, Weaver has shown up and tells Victoria about what she has done by placing Lucy in a coma so she can revive her daughter. Victoria is more upset that Weaver believes that Anastasia might be the Guardian that he's been seeking. A skeptical Victoria agreed to take Anastasia to a location with Weaver to test out the theory. In the lab room, Weaver has Anastasia pick out which of the five knives is the Dagger, and suddenly she causes a rumble that allowed the knives to direct itself to a cabinet and Weaver finds the real Dagger. Unfortunately, Anastasia became more disturbed when Eloise found her and she knocked Victoria and Weaver out. A scared Anastasia runs away, only to see a surprised Ivy, who gave her a pair of bracelets to control her powers. Afterwards, Rogers and Tilly, who have been tracking down a series of strange symbols that have shown up around the area, visit the lab and find an unconscious Weaver, who informed the two that the Coven of the Eight are in Hyperion Heights.

Ivy tricked Anastasia by bringing her to Eloise, as she hoped to get even with her sister by absorbing her powers with the bracelets, only to discover that Eloise betrayed Ivy by rendering her powerless by having Anastasia reclaim her powers with the bracelets, as she was the chosen one to follow Eloise/Gothel. Ivy/Drizella is then sent to a well hole, joining Rapunzel/Victoria as her prisoner. Gothel then takes Anastasia to a secret location to show her the wardrobe of the Coven, telling her that they are in Hyperion Heights and she knows where to look for them.

=== In San Francisco ===
Meanwhile in San Francisco, Regina enlisted Henry in helping her meet someone who happens to work in a fitness center. Pretending to be new members, the two see the bike trainer leading the group, Kelly, who happens to be Zelena under her new cursed identity. Kelly, who still believes that Regina is still Roni and is bitter over having hired her daughter to work at the bar and giving her a ticket to Amsterdam and now instead of going to college, is now at a foam party in Phuket and never coming home. Kelly refuses to go back to Seattle with Regina, but using a potion to restore her memory, Regina offered Kelly a drink of whiskey and Kelly reluctantly accepted. After a sip, Kelly suddenly remembers her previous life as Zelena and the sisters are reunited for real. However, Zelena tells Regina that she is getting married soon, making it difficult to help Regina return to Seattle, but agrees to put the wedding aside to do this.

== Reception ==
=== Reviews ===
The episode received mostly positive reviews from critics, although some thought it wasn't as strong as the previous episodes, but were impressed with how it kept the twists and dark overtones throughout the story.

Paul Dailly of TV Fanatic gave it a 4.8 out of 5 stars.

Entertainment Weekly's Justin Kirkland gave it a B−.
