= A Pirate's Life =

- Once Upon a Time episode
- Episode no.: Season 7 Episode 2
- Directed by: Tara Nicole Weyr
- Written by: Jane Espenson; Jerome Schwartz

Guest appearances
- Jennifer Morrison as Emma Swan/Mrs. Jones (special guest star); Mekia Cox as Tiana/Sabine; Jared S. Gilmore as 18-years-old Henry; Adelaide Kane as Drizella/Ivy Belfrey

Episode chronology
← Previous "Hyperion Heights"	Next → "The Garden of Forking Paths"
- Once Upon a Time season 7

"A Pirate's Life" is the second episode of the seventh season and the 135th episode overall of the American fantasy-drama series Once Upon a Time. Written by Jane Espenson & Jerome Schwartz, and directed by Tara Nicole Weyr, it premiered on ABC in the United States on October 13, 2017.

In the episode, Henry summons Regina, Hook and Emma to help him find Cinderella, but Lady Tremaine is determined to stop him by enlisting a doppelgänger in order to infiltrate them, while in the present day Victoria enlists Rogers and Weaver to find a way to push Henry out of the neighborhood and keep Jacinda from seeing Lucy during a recital.

The episode reintroduces the Wish Realm version of Hook, who is part of the main cast for this season.

== Plot ==
=== Opening sequence ===
A Swan is featured in the background.

=== In the characters' past ===
==== Storybrooke ====
Years earlier, Hook is training Henry to defend himself with swords. When Emma congratulates him Hook catches Henry off guard, and Henry goes to cool off feeling that he won't be appreciated. Emma and Hook believe that Henry will make a name for himself in the future. After the two kiss, Hook shows Emma a magic bottle that can act as a signal to call anyone in distress and he throws it in the ocean.

==== New Enchanted Forest ====
Years later, Henry is chased by Lady Tremaine and her guards, who want to pin the prince's murder on him. When she does catch up with Henry, Lady Tremaine demands the whereabouts of Cinderella and the glass slipper. Henry refuses and uses the bottle to summon Emma, Regina, and Hook, but he is soon taken prisoner and is later tied to a bed in the palace. Lady Tremaine gives Drizella orders to torture Henry for information on where he hid the slipper by using her dagger to threaten him, only to be interrupted by Hook and Regina, who show up to stop the guard and Drizella respectively. While Henry is happy to see Regina, he asks Hook where Emma is. Regina gives a scorned look to Hook for lying to Henry about why Emma didn't come.

Regina tries to help Henry out by using a locator spell. However, she discovers that her magic doesn't work in this realm. Hook, however, can smell saltwater and suspects that pirates are not far, and it may lead them to Cinderella. At a tavern, Hook is met by a very drunken individual who happens to be the wish realm version of Killian Jones. The unrecognizable Hook tells his lookalike about how their stories differ, except that in this realm he's still looking for his Emma. The drunken Hook then knocks out his lookalike and draws his blood, as he had made a deal with Lady Tremaine to help her find Henry. Using the Fairy Godmother's wand, Lady Tremaine transformed the drunken Hook into an exact lookalike of the Enchanted Forest character.

Meanwhile, in a cabin, Regina is cooking a meal for Henry, who is asking her questions about what was happening in Storybrooke but she avoids them as she lamented that hers isn't great. The wish realm Hook soon joins them and suggests they all return to Storybrooke. He gives Henry a forged note from Cinderella, but when the faux Hook goes after Henry to console him, Emma arrives out of a portal and is ready to tell Henry the news that she's pregnant. This suddenly upsets the faux Hook and he runs off into the woods and back to the tavern, just in time for real Hook to attack him. The faux Hook then takes out a dagger and is stabbed by the real Hook. When the real Hook asks why, the faux Hook tells him that he wanted to find his daughter, who he believed is a prisoner. He hoped that Emma would help him. When Emma arrives, the real Hook asks Emma to save his lookalike, but Emma's magic doesn't work in this realm either, so she convinces the faux Hook to use his belief. This works, as Emma's magic briefly returns, allowing her to heal the faux Hook.

As Henry congratulates Emma and the real Hook on their future, he convinces the faux Hook to stay and offers to help him find his daughter. Regina decides to stay in order to find her happy ending.

=== In Seattle ===
Henry meets up with Rogers, who wants to ask him about the blonde woman in the book. Henry says that it's a person he made up named “Emma Swan” and then the conversation turned to Jacinda and Lucy. Speaking about the mother and daughter, Victoria is making sure that Jacinda won't see Lucy at a ballet recital by using a tactic to hike the prices up so Jacinda can't afford it. Henry later on tries to help Jacinda by asking for forgiveness but to no avail as Jacinda returns to work. Meanwhile, Victoria asks Weaver and Rogers to get rid of a problem, being Henry. When Weaver visits Roni's, he doesn't get anywhere with Roni but as she see Weaver leave Roni warns Rogers to be careful about Weaver.

Hours later, Jacinda's roommate helps her land a job at the recital's catering event, where she discovers Henry working there as a bartender. She then hugs Lucy before her performance. Over at Henry's apartment, Rogers and Weaver are looking for anything that could make Henry vulnerable, which leads them to Lucy. As the two leave, Rogers noticed the Swan keychain on the doorknob. The two then come up with an idea to place Victoria's bracelet in Henry's pocket and Weaver wants Rogers to plant it on Henry. However. when Henry emptied his pockets, the only thing that Henry saw was the Swan Necklace. Outside the venue, Weaver stops Rogers from hiding Victoria's bracelet. Rogers tells Weaver that he doesn't want to separate a father from his child, and Weaver commended Rogers for doing the right thing. Rogers then revealed that a long time ago he was shot and a woman who fit Emma's description came to his rescue. He wants to do what is right and figure out what is going on in this neighborhood.

Later on at Roni's, Jacinda forgives Henry, saying that she blames her mood on Lucy's claims that she is Cinderella, but tells Henry that one day her prince will come. Afterwards, Rogers joins Henry and Roni for drinks, each with one thing in common: to find a way to take down Victoria Belfrey.

== Production ==
- The scenes featuring the New Enchanted Forest was shot at Burnaby, British Columbia's Central Park.
- The Vancouver Rowing Club in Vancouver's Stanley Park doubled for the scenes where Lucy's recital was taking place.
- The street scene with Rogers and Weaver at the end of the episode was filmed on Columbia Street in New Westminster, British Columbia
- It was the first episode to credit Jennifer Morrison as a special guest star.

== Casting ==
- This episode was the intended final appearance for Jennifer Morrison, who decided to leave the series at the conclusion of the sixth season. Morrison agreed to return for a final episode in order to give fans a final chance to see what happened to Emma and to give her character a proper closure. In March 2018, it was revealed Morrison would reprise the role for the series finale.
- The episode reveals that the Killian Jones that was cursed as Rogers in Hyperion Heights was not the original one from the Enchanted Forest, but rather his Wish Realm counterpart, who was introduced in the season six episode "Tougher Than the Rest". O'Donoghue knew about the surprise twist when production began as he kept hinting that there was a reason why they wanted to make sure that Emma and Hook had a happy ending.

== Reception ==
=== Reviews ===
The episode received mixed to positive reviews. Paul Dailly of TV Fanatic gave it a 3.3 out of 5 stars, stating “A Pirate's Life" was disappointing. “Aside from the subpar writing, it was a slow-paced hour of this ABC series. It's a real shame considering how well Once Upon a Time Season 7 started.” Entertainment Weekly's Justin Kirkland gave it a B, but praised O'Donoghue's performance. Nick Hogan of TVOvermind gave the episode a 4 out of 5 stars rating, Stating “We're two episodes in and I'm impressed. It still feels a LITTLE contrived, but in such a fantasy driven world, I'm willing to give it a long leash. Mostly though, it felt like a reunion episode with a lot longer of a break than we actually got. I ain't even mad.”
