= Natalie Canerday =

American actress

- Born: Russellville, Arkansas, U.S.
- Education: Hendrix College
- Known for: Film actress
- Notable work: Sling Blade, October Sky

Natalie Canerday is an American actress.

Canerday is a native of Russellville, Arkansas. After earning a Bachelor of Arts degree in Theatre in 1985 from Hendrix College (where she performed in plays with Herman's Head star William Ragsdale), she began her motion picture career as a production secretary for the television feature The Tuskegee Airmen, then made minor appearances in films such as Biloxi Blues and Walk the Line, and later Shotgun Stories. She played the wife of a small town sheriff in the 1991 film One False Move. Her most famous roles have been as protagonists' harried mothers in Sling Blade and October Sky. In 1996, she and others in Billy Bob Thornton's Sling Blade cast were collectively nominated for the Screen Actors Guild Award for Best Cast in a Motion Picture.

Canerday served as a judge for the 2006 George Lindsey/UNA Film Festival, and in 2007 was cast in a national radio commercial. In October 2009 she worked in the Oak Ridge Secret City Film Festival in Oak Ridge, Tennessee, which was known as the 7 day shoot-out because the contestants had only 7 days to make a 2–7 minute short-film. She played the part of a bartender in the short film Third Rate Romance directed by Chase Hartsook.

She has also appeared in South of Heaven, West of Hell; the 2011 movie The Last Ride; and one episode of the animated TV series King of the Hill.

Recently, Canerday has co-starred in the films God's Not Dead 2, Antiquities, an episode of season three of the HBO series True Detective, and the 2020 film Finding Love in Mountain View, which was shot on location in Mountain View, Arkansas. Her later movies include Hellfire starring Stephen Lang and Harvey Keitel, Good Time Charley, and the short film Souvenirs.
