= After (The Walking Dead) =

- The Walking Dead episode
- Carl blames Rick for their many losses after the assault.
- Episode no.: Season 4 Episode 9
- Directed by: Greg Nicotero
- Written by: Robert Kirkman
- Cinematography by: Michael Satrazemis
- Editing by: Kelley Dixon
- Original air date: February 9, 2014

Guest appearances
- Aldis Hodge as Mike; Brandon Fobbs as Terry

Episode chronology
← Previous "Too Far Gone"	Next → "Inmates"
- The Walking Dead season 4

"After" is the ninth episode and mid-season premiere of the fourth season of the post-apocalyptic horror television series The Walking Dead, which aired on AMC on February 9, 2014. The episode was written by Robert Kirkman and directed by Greg Nicotero.

The plot for this episode is very similar to "Volume 9", "Issue #49" and "Issue #50" of the comic book series.

Following the attack on the prison, Rick (Andrew Lincoln) and Carl (Chandler Riggs) find themselves on the road looking for shelter. They have to come to terms with their new environment and ask themselves if survival alone is enough. However, after his vicious fight with The Governor (David Morrissey), Rick also deals with old wounds as he is in desperate need to rest and heal. Concurrently, Michonne (Danai Gurira) finds herself once again alone and haunted by memories of the past as she tries to come to grips with how she wants to spend her life.

The episode was watched by 15.76 million viewers, a significant rise in ratings from the previous episode two months prior. However, commentators had varied reactions to it, with many noting positively to the character development, but commenting negatively on the episode's pace.

== Plot ==
Following The Governor's deadly assault on the prison, the survivors are forced to scatter and try to regroup. Michonne reconnoiters the prison for survivors. She discovers the reanimated head of her friend, Hershel, and stabs it to put him out of his torment. She discovers a trail of footprints leading away from the prison. To protect herself, she slices off the arms and jaws of two walkers, leading them pet-like to help mask her presence from other walkers, however this appears to draw more walkers toward her and they form a herd around her. While taking shelter in a car overnight, she dreams of her young son, her boyfriend Mike (Aldis Hodge), and his friend Terry (Brandon Fobbs) before the apocalypse, but the dream turns into a nightmare when Mike and Terry appear like her walker 'pets'. She continues onward, but on observing a walker that looks similar to herself, suddenly comes to the realization that her mindless walking is for naught; she slaughters the walkers that surround her and her pets, and vows to Mike that she now has a purpose in life. She sets off to follow the trail of footprints.

Meanwhile, Carl and Rick, whose footprints Michonne is following, work their way from the prison, Rick slowing them down due to injuries he sustained in the assault on the prison. They stop at a diner to find food and encounter a lone walker barricaded behind furniture. Rick wants to kill it using an axe but is too weak, forcing Carl to kill it with his gun. Rick and Carl enter an abandoned house and barricade the door before Rick falls unconscious. The following morning, Carl wakes and shouts at Rick to try to wake him, attracting nearby walkers. Carl is able to dispatch them, and when he returns, yells at a still unconscious Rick, blaming him for abandoning his leadership role, hurting himself, his mother Lori, his newborn sibling Judith, and the others of his group at the prison. Later, Carl goes to search for supplies in a nearby house. He nearly is bitten by a walker trapped behind one door, but is able to escape when the walker pulls off his boot. He recovers additional food and supplies, and returns to the house where Rick is. He sees Rick crawling toward him and moaning, and fearing his father has become a walker, turns his gun on him. Rick calls out Carl's name, proving he is still alive. Rick sees what Carl has done to protect and sustain them, and apologizes for his behavior, and believes Carl is now a man.

Michonne arrives at the house the following morning and, after observing through a window that they are alive and well, begins to cry tears of joy. As Rick and Carl bond over a meal, there is a knock at the door. Rick looks through the peephole, and, upon seeing Michonne, laughs and tells Carl, "It's for you."

== Production ==
"After" was written by comic book creator and executive producer Robert Kirkman and directed by special effects makeup artist and executive producer Greg Nicotero.

This episode focuses entirely on the characters of Rick (Andrew Lincoln), Carl (Chandler Riggs) and Michonne (Danai Gurira). Scott Wilson (Hershel Greene) and David Morrissey (The Governor) have brief final appearances as corpses. "After" is the final episode to feature Morrissey's name in the opening credits; Wilson's name is featured in the season finale, "A". Norman Reedus (Daryl), Steven Yeun (Glenn), Lauren Cohan (Maggie) and Melissa McBride (Carol) are all credited, but do not appear. Emily Kinney (Beth), Chad L. Coleman (Tyreese), Sonequa Martin-Green (Sasha) and Lawrence Gilliard Jr. (Bob) are also absent, but are credited as "also starring".

The plot for this episode is derived almost entirely from "Volume 9", "Issue #50" of the comic book series.

Chandler Riggs, who plays Carl, has admitted that "After" is his favorite episode of the series.

From this episode onwards, The Walking Dead began airing in the United Kingdom, a day after its United States airdate, instead of five days after.

== Reception ==
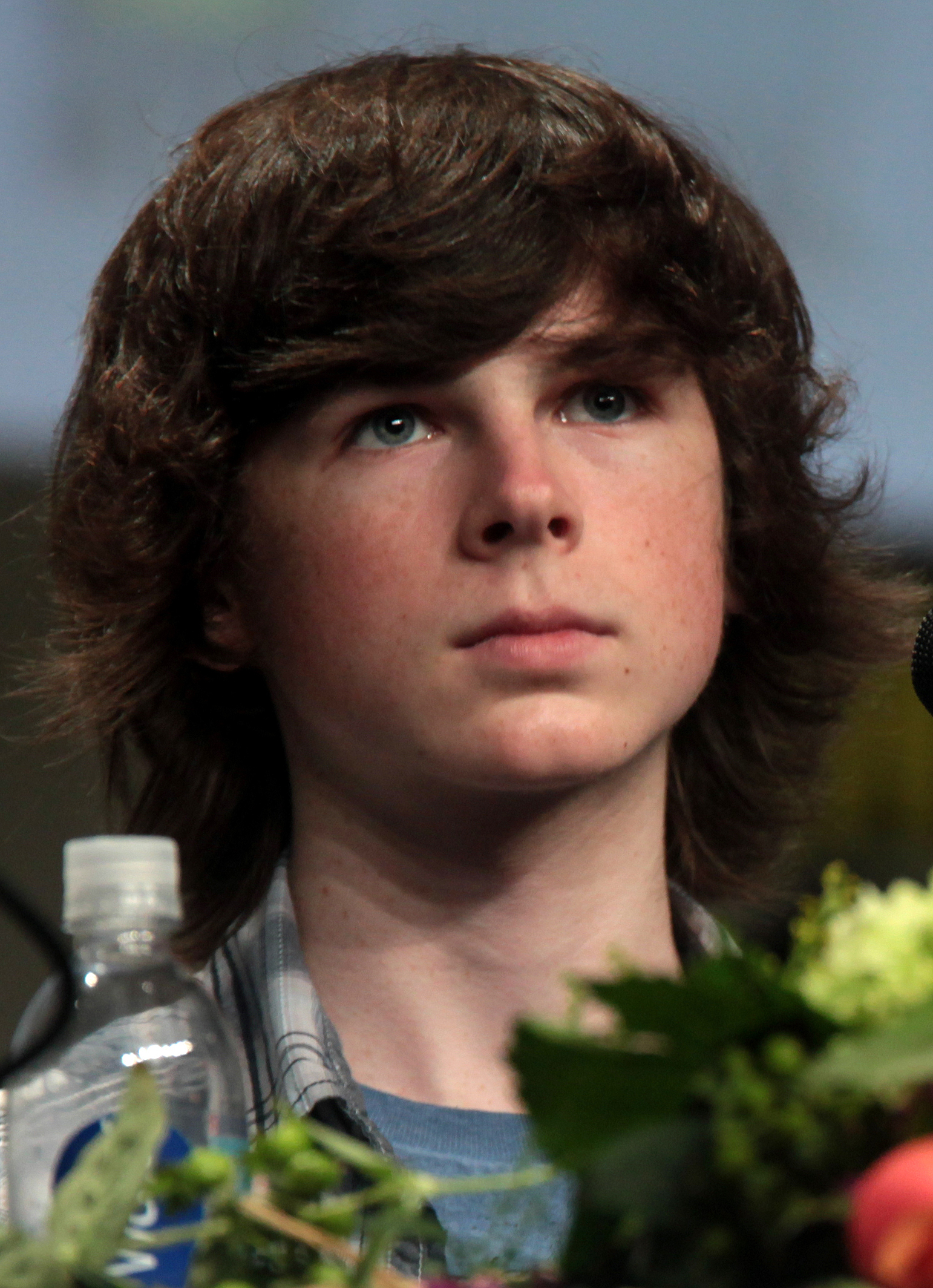
Chandler Riggs received critical acclaim for his performance as Carl Grimes in this episode.

=== Critical response ===
The episode received moderate reviews from most critics, with most praising the episode's focus on the secondary characters, but others commenting negatively on the series' shift in environment and the episode's pace. Katla McGlynn of The Huffington Post summarized the episode by saying: "Phew! That was quite an episode. Although we didn't get to see what's happening with the rest of the group, we learned more about Michonne than ever and finally got to see Carl become a man. Instead of a traditional rite of passage like a bar mitzvah or a co-ed birthday party, Carl got to kill zombies and eat copious amounts of pudding! Welcome to adulthood, Carl."

Roth Cornet of IGN gave the episode an 8.5 out of 10, saying: "The Walking Dead opened the second half of Season 4 with a restrained, but effective episode that saw its characters faced with the challenge of accepting, and even embracing, the reality of the lives they're living - even the horror."

Sean Tepper of the Toronto Star gave a moderate review of the episode, starting with a mixed commentary on the show's shift from the previous episode, saying: "Instead of kicking off the second half of Season 4 with a bang, The Walking Dead took a sizeable risk with its mid-season premiere as showrunner Scott Gimple focused more on character development than on the gruesome, over-the-top zombie killing that we’ve come to appreciate in AMC’s hit series." He then commented positively on the episode's beginning scene at the prison, saying: "by kicking off the episode with various shots of the zombie-infested prison, a quick look at the Governor’s body and an emotionally charged scene that saw Michonne drive her katana through Herschel’s severed, zombified head, 'After’s' pre-credit scene served as a satisfying end to the show’s prison saga and gave the episode a tone more akin to a traditional season premiere." He also positively reviewed Carl and Michonne's roles in the episode, saying: "If there’s one thing that The Walking Dead has proved time and time again it’s that superficial supporting roles can be transformed into multifaceted, essential characters and last night’s episode was at its best when it gave Carl the opportunity to escape Rick’s shadow," and "gave us some insight into her [Michonne's] past along with a better understanding of the events that shaped her post-apocalyptic persona."

Not all reviews were positive. Patrick Kevin Day of the Los Angeles Times — though commenting positively on the character development, saying the episode "gets huge mileage out of small character moments and goes a long way to making Carl an interesting character for the first time" — commented negatively on the episode's beginning, saying: "the episode seemed too intent on attempting to jolt viewers by killing off beloved characters, such as the saintly Hershel. Many seemed to love it, but I felt the escalating body count was providing diminishing returns."

Tim Surette of TV.com commented positively on the series' change in environment, saying: "Now The Walking Dead can return to the enjoyable (for us, anyway) world outside those barbed-wire fences, a world where our survivors can't just garden all day and then safely tuck themselves into bed behind six-foot-thick concrete walls. Now they'll have zombies nipping at their heels as they try to make it to another sunrise, hoping they'll live long enough to have one more argument over whether or not Rick is a good leader." However, he commented negatively on the episode's pace, saying: "large stretches of "After" were, indeed, boring. I wanted to like the episode a lot more than I did, because I think it was making an effort to both deliver a message and reintroduce us to the danger of this world by showing us how it can break even the sturdiest survivors. Otherwise, it was just characters walking around and killing zombies. And even that's starting to get old."

=== Ratings ===
Upon its original airing, "After" garnered 15.76 million viewers, 10.9 million of them in the 18-49 demographic, and it was the No. 1 telecast for the night among adults 18–49, beating even the Sochi Winter Olympics. Viewership increased 30% from the previous episode, making "After" the second-highest rated episode of the series after the fourth season premiere, which garnered 16.1 million viewers.
