= Curtains (Under the Dome) =

- Under the Dome episode
- Episode no.: Season 1 Episode 13
- Directed by: Jack Bender
- Written by: Brian K. Vaughan & Scott Gold
- Original air date: September 16, 2013

Guest appearances
- Chris Johnson as volunteer; Kevin Patrick Murray as farmer; Zuri Adele as mother

Episode chronology
← Previous "Exigent Circumstances"	Next → "Heads Will Roll"
- Under the Dome (season 1)

"Curtains" is the thirteenth episode and the season finale of the first season of the CBS drama Under the Dome. It aired September 16, 2013.

The episode has Big Jim (Dean Norris) deciding Barbie's (Mike Vogel) fate after having him arrested. Meanwhile, the Monarch is revealed after a series of events that bring many characters together. Also, the nature of the dome's existence is revealed after an unlikely character (Samantha Mathis) emerges.

The episode was watched by 12.1 million American viewers, despite drawing mainly negative reviews from critics, who considered the finale underwhelming and lacking answers to certain questions.

== Plot ==
The monarch hatches, and the butterfly starts flying around inside the mini dome violently and creating expanding black spots where it crashes against the surface. These spots are mapped onto the big dome and begin to expand until both domes are jet black, casting the town into permanent darkness. Joe (Colin Ford) suggests the four touch the dome, but Linda (Natalie Martinez) cuts in, stating the egg is police property. The four choose not to stop her, knowing that she will be knocked unconscious and that this will allow them to escape. Junior (Alexander Koch), Angie (Britt Robertson), Joe, and Norrie (Mackenzie Lintz) then touch the dome together, and the mini-dome shatters, releasing both the egg and the butterfly. At first, the butterfly seems to hover around their prime candidate for Monarch, Barbie (Mike Vogel), but finally, they discover that the Monarch is instead Julia (Rachelle Lefevre).

They receive a visit from one of the dome's representatives, which manifests as Alice (Samantha Mathis). The visitor states that it has taken a human form to "bridge the divide," and that the reason for the dome is "to protect them." When they ask from what, the reply is, "you will see, in time." They also discover that they must earn the light from the outside world back by keeping the egg safe. Barbie is then captured by Junior.

Big Jim (Dean Norris) thinks that his family members are the chosen ones because his mentally ill and deceased wife had been painting pink stars and eggs in her last days, indicating she had some knowledge of things to come. When Junior confronts him, he admits that he has actually killed the people he accused Barbie of murdering, but just to save the town. They put Barbie in a noose and then Julia has to choose between saving the egg and thus the lives of the townspeople and saving only Barbie by giving the egg to Big Jim within one hour. She accepts the responsibility of the title Monarch and chooses the egg (and the lives of everybody in the dome) and protects it by throwing it in the lake. The egg starts to glow, and pink stars rise into the sky. Big Jim claims that "the Lord" is blessing the hanging, the pink stars continue to rise and remove the black "curtain," replacing it with a curtain of piercing bright light, which increases in intensity until things start to fade to white. Junior seeks guidance from his dad, and Big Jim continues to tell Junior to pull the lever; as the camera focuses on Barbie's face, ending the season ambiguously.

== Production ==
Natalie Martinez, who plays Linda in the series, talked to The Hollywood Reporter discussing details about the finale, saying "We don't know what's going to happen. We didn't get a full script until two or three days into shooting; we were shooting a script we hadn't read yet just because that's how dark they're keeping it. Things are constantly changing it and moving around and we're just as in the dark as everybody else is," and also said regarding her character "I don't think Linda is as naive; she's finally growing up and coming from that small-town cop to being someone who is learning to trust their own instincts after never being in those situations before. She's stronger and standing up for what she believes is right. She has grown a lot this season."

== Reception ==
=== Ratings ===
The episode aired on September 16, 2013, and was watched by 12.10 million American viewers, and received an 18-49 rating/share of 2.8/8, making this the most-watched episode of the series after the pilot episode. The show placed first in its timeslot and third for the night, behind the series premiere of Sleepy Hollow, and the seventeenth season premiere of Dancing with the Stars.

=== Critical reception ===
The finale drew mixed to negative reviews from professional critics.

Ashley Knierim of The Huffington Post gave the finale a mixed to positive review, saying "Despite the bizarre twists, bad choices and head-scratching scenarios, I'd venture to say that "Under the Dome" was the TV show of summer 2013. No matter how bad it got, we kept watching. This the finale ended with as much fanfare as the show began with."

Matt Fowler of IGN gave the episode a 6.9 out of 10, signalling mixed reviews, saying

I bought Jim winning over the crowd last week by terrorizing them with the idea of a murderer on the loose. But I didn't buy the church scene this week. Religion's hardly ever been brought up on this show and now just about everyone in Chester's Mill is dead set on believing that the apocalypse has arrived. Where were they when the Dome came down? Or when the sky turned into a giant tornado? All of a sudden, they have faith that the world is over but, somehow, all it takes is for Jim to say that he has faith that it's not for them to forget all about it. Mule fritters. Now here's what worked in the Season 1 finale. Julia was revealed to be "The Monarch" - the full meaning of which we still don't understand. But now we know why the Dome created a giant sharknado when she got shot. Also, the Dome itself decided to make first contact with Julia and the teens - appearing as Norrie's mom, Alice, and telling them that the Dome was created in order to protect them. From World War III? From World War Z? Something. We don't know, but it finally put to rest the idea that the Dome is hostile. It's picky and stubborn, but it's not meant to be a direct threat. Also, I like the whole mystery of Jim's wife painting the pink stars and the black egg years ago. And that somehow this entire alien structure is/was linked to her madness. For a second actually, I thought that Jim revisiting those paintings would soften his heart a bit. Perhaps give him a moment's pause about the things he's done. But it seemed to drive him over the edge even more - convincing him that he's destined to rule over the dominion of the Dome. And the pink stars, um, things at the end created a neat visual.

Andrea Reiher of Zap2it said "It's interesting how Big Jim had never heard anyone talk about the pink stars during one of their seizures, hence his first time of hearing that in tonight's episode. We had never really thought about it. But he recognizes it as something his wife Pauline said in the months before she killed herself. Hopefully the show finds a way to explore that some more." Also, in regards to Big Jim's revelation, she said "this revelation about Pauline's sayings and paintings has Linda drinking even more of the Big Jim Kool-Aid, convinced that he is "important" to the town and its survival." She then said "Nice touch with Julia being the monarch," and with the reveal of the dome's origin, she said "Do you think the dome was sent by aliens? Is that what spectre Alice meant to you? Stephen King and the creators have said the show is different from the book, so we're curious how this plays out." On October 2, 2013, Zap2it called Big Jim's line "You want the truth? I have taken lives but none that weren't absolutely necessary for the good of this town" one of the best TV lines of September 2013.

Scott Von Doviak of The A.V. Club gave the episode a D− rating, saying "So what were the odds that all of this stuff with the egg and the Monarch and the mini-dome was going to pay off in a satisfying way in this season finale? Not good, especially for those of us who have had the rug yanked out from under us too many times by Lost-like mystery-box contraptions. But somehow "Curtains" was even worse than I imagined it could be, as arbitrary and unsatisfying a season finale as I can remember." Dawn Fallik writing for The Wall Street Journal also gave the episode a negative review, saying "The series started out so well and was so interesting. And then it all fell apart. Every week Big Jim did something bad. Someone else was killed. We never really found out much of the back story for, well, anyone, least of all the dome," and then said "Because it’s been renewed for Season 2 and Stephen King is writing the first episode. Please let it be more satisfying then this hanging participle."

Darren Franich of Entertainment Weekly also reviewed the finale negatively, saying "A good season finale can rescue a bad season. Whatever happened last night was not a good season finale. A summer of incoherent plotting ended incoherently. There was, however, some minor clarity about the mystery of the Dome — it’s almost certainly created by aliens, unless it’s created by people from the future and/or cyborg angels. The episode ended on a cliffhanger that made no sense whatsoever. But hey, it’ll be back for another season in 2014 — plenty of time to work out the kinks."

==== Baer and Vaughan's responses ====
In regards to the critical and fan reception of the finale, Brian K. Vaughan responded to The Hollywood Reporter saying "If I've learned anything from Lost it's that we have to leave this for the fans and let them digest it and argue about it and complain about it. I'm being coy because I'd rather not reveal that. We have big plans for how next season will be different and more exciting but I don't want to reveal them yet." Neal Baer also defended the finale, saying "I think we provided a big answer last night, which is that the dome is there to protect them and that there is some alien force - as we saw through Alien Alice - so that's a big revelation that there's something beyond us, beyond Earth, that's controlling the dome. I think that's a big answer as to what's to come and how they're going to deal with that. There's also the revelation that Julia will play a huge role against Big Jim next season."
