= Force Majeure (Under the Dome) =

- Under the Dome episode
- Episode no.: Season 2 Episode 3
- Directed by: Peter Leto
- Written by: Adam Stein
- Original air date: July 14, 2014

Guest appearances
- Grace Victoria Cox as Melanie Cross; Sherry Stringfield as Pauline Rennie; Dwight Yoakam as Lyle Chumley

Episode chronology
← Previous "Infestation"	Next → "Revelation"
- Under the Dome (season 2)

"Force Majeure" is the third episode of the second season of the CBS drama series Under the Dome, and the sixteenth episode overall. The episode premiered on July 14, 2014.

== Plot ==
Rebecca Pine (Karla Crome) and James "Big Jim" Rennie (Dean Norris) hold a census at the diner in order to determine how to apportion resources. When the Dome begins to produce red rain that burns exposed skin, Lyle Chumley (Dwight Yoakam), the town barber, tries to convince them that it is one of the ten plagues before an impending apocalypse. He grows torn when Rebecca tries to explain the rain scientifically.

Meanwhile, Junior (Alexander Koch) finds out his mother, Pauline Verdreaux (Sherry Stringfield), is alive. Joe McAlister (Colin Ford) and Elinore "Norrie" Calvert-Hill (Mackenzie Lintz) continue to search for clues regarding Angie McAlister's (Britt Robertson) death, and in doing so find out more about Melanie Cross' (Grace Victoria Cox) past.

== Reception ==
=== Ratings ===
The episode was watched by 7.64 million viewers and received an 18–49 rating/share of 1.9/6. This marks a decrease in viewers from the previous episode but an increase in the 18–49 rating. The show placed first in its timeslot and first for the night. Via DVR, 4.33 million viewers watched the episode, bringing the total viewership to 11.97 million and attaining an 18–49 rating of 3.2.

=== Critical reception ===
Andrea Reiher of Zap2it gave a mixed to positive review of the episode, saying "There's certainly a chance all of Season 2 has been made up on the fly in between seasons, but I don't think so. I think this is where the show was going and it would have been better if it had gotten there a little faster." She then commented positively on Dwight Yoakam's role, saying "it's great that they had Dwight Yoakam sing a little bit in the episode. There should be a Chester's Mill talent show while he's still guest-starring."

Chancellor Agard of Entertainment Weekly also gave a mixed review, saying "It's hard to tell whether tonight's episode of Under the Dome was better or worse than last week's episode. On one hand, it surprised us all with a Junior story line that was actually interesting. On the other hand, this story line was not given enough attention because the episode spent too much time revisiting the science vs. faith debate through a low stakes crisis of the week—something Under the Dome has tried and failed at before."

Gwen Ihnat of The A.V. Club gave the episode a C+ rating, saying:

Despite the overall distastefulness of this episode (honestly, I felt like taking an acid-free shower afterward, but of course had to write this instead), the show still contains enough drama to keep me intrigued past just snark-watching. My whole family was peeking through fingers when Joe opened the locker (our take: what’s in the magical locker depends on who opens it, much like the suitcase in Pulp Fiction). And I want to know more about Sherry Stringfield’s alliance with the evil drunk doctor and the religious barber. I’m even curious about the time wormhole that got expressionless Melanie to arrive in Chester’s Mill in the middle of a lake. Trapped underneath a bunch of hackneyed plots and science versus faith arguments and the blandest romance that ever landed in the center of a TV show, there’s still valuable suspense here. So I just can’t stop watching yet. Just like in a real force majeure, all bets appear to be off."
