= Infested (disambiguation) =

Infested is a 2023 French horror film co-written and directed by Sébastien Vaniček.

Infested may also refer to:

- Ticks, a 1993 film also known as Infested
- Infested (Witch Creek Road), a season of Witch Creek Road
- "Infested" (Star Wars: The Bad Batch), an episode of Star Wars: The Bad Batch

== See also ==
- Infestation (disambiguation)
- Infest (disambiguation)
