= Heads Will Roll (Under the Dome) =

- Under the Dome episode
- Episode no.: Season 2 Episode 1
- Directed by: Jack Bender
- Written by: Stephen King
- Original air date: June 30, 2014

Guest appearances
- Grace Victoria Cox as Melanie Cross; Aisha Hinds as Carolyn Hill; Sherry Stringfield as Pauline; Jolene Purdy as Dodee; Stephen King as diner patron

Episode chronology
← Previous "Curtains"	Next → "Infestation"
- Under the Dome (season 2)

"Heads Will Roll" is the second-season premiere of the CBS drama series Under the Dome, and the fourteenth episode overall. The episode premiered on June 30, 2014.

This episode immediately follows the events of the previous season finale, "Curtains", with Julia coming back to shore after having dropped the egg in the lake and Barbie in a noose on the gallows in the town square.

The episode was met by mixed reviews from most critics, with some criticizing the show's dependency on plot twists; though others commented positively on the episode's special effects.

Upon airing, the episode was watched by 9.41 million American viewers and received an 18–49 rating of 2.1, placing first in its timeslot and first for the night.

== Plot ==
Dale "Barbie" Barbara's (Mike Vogel) fate is left in the hands of James "Big Jim" Rennie (Dean Norris) and his son James "Junior" Rennie (Alexander Koch) after being falsely charged with numerous crimes committed by Big Jim. Barbie, wearing a noose around his neck, is waiting for Junior to pull the lever on the gallows releasing the trap-door. However, the Dome emits a mysterious sound which scares Junior from pulling the lever and causes Sheriff Linda Esquivel (Natalie Martinez) to halt the execution. It turns out that the Dome has become magnetized, causing execution observers to pass out. Linda, Junior, Barbie, and Big Jim visit the Dome wall where its magnetization pulls all metal objects against it, including Barbie who is still in metal handcuffs. While freeing Barbie from the cuffs, Linda is killed by being crushed between the Dome's wall and an SUV pulled by the magnetization.

Meanwhile, Julia Shumway (Rachelle Lefevre) meets Sam Verdreaux (Eddie Cahill) while rescuing from drowning a mysterious teenage girl (Grace Victoria Cox) who may hold clues to the origin of the Dome. Julia leaves Sam and the girl to look for Barbie. Later in the episode it is revealed that Sam is Junior's uncle and Big Jim's brother-in-law.

Determined to save the rest of the townspeople, Barbie meets Rebecca Pine (Karla Crome), a high school science teacher who has many theories about the Dome. Inside the McAlister's house Elinore "Norrie" Calvert-Hill's (Mackenzie Lintz) mother, Carolyn Hill (Aisha Hinds), passes out from a large magnetization pulse. Fighting against "flying" dangerous metal objects, Barbie, Rebecca, Joe McAlister (Colin Ford), Angie McAlister (Britt Robertson), and Norrie pull Carolyn out of the house seconds before the house is torn apart from the pulse. While Barbie and Rebecca attempt to stop the pulses, the teens are convinced that the Dome is punishing them for not killing Big Jim when it told them to.

The Dome's magnetic force locks Big Jim in the fall-out shelter where he is taunted by Dodee Weaver's (Jolene Purdy) ghost. Eventually he blows himself out with grenades but then sees Junior unconscious next to the gallows. Another large pulse has caused almost everyone inside the Dome to pass out, with the exception of Barbie, Julia, and Big Jim. Big Jim believes the Dome is telling him to sacrifice himself so he prepares to hang himself. He is unable to reach the lever while standing on the trap-door so he asks Julia and Barbie for assistance. Julia accepts but then refuses to follow through, forcing Big Jim to break through the door himself. Julia prevents Big Jim's death by cutting the rope after she becomes convinced that killing Big Jim is not the answer. She believes the Dome instead wants the townspeople to stop killing each other. Once Julia cuts Big Jim loose, the townspeople begin to wake up from their unconscious states and the Dome releases all the metal objects.

Big Jim tries to gain the townspeople's trust back by appointing Phil Bushey (Nicholas Strong) as the new sheriff and inviting Joe, Angie, Norrie, and Carolyn to stay at his house. Junior then pulls Big Jim aside and tells him while he was unconscious he had a vision of his supposedly deceased mother Pauline Rennie (Sherry Stringfield). Big Jim tries to reassure him that it was just a dream but Junior refuses to believe him. Meanwhile, outside the dome it is revealed that Junior's mother is still alive, living single but concerned for her son under the dome.

Later that night Angie sees the girl who was rescued by Julia and follows her into the school where she is seen looking into a locker. The girl notices Angie and runs away. Angie looks inside the locker and is stunned by whatever is there, then gets cut down by an unseen assailant. Her bloody hand-print on the locker is the last thing we see.

== Production ==
Shortly after the series was renewed for its second season it was announced that Stephen King, the author of the novel which inspired the TV series, would write this episode. In preparation for writing the episode King "went back and looked at the last episode twice and [...] the last scene about 15 times."

On June 23, 2014, a week prior to the season premiere, a TV special entitled Under the Dome: Inside Chester's Mill aired on CBS and featured a condensed recap of the first season, interviews with the cast and crew, and a sneak preview of the premiere. The special was watched by 4.34 million American viewers and received an 18–49 rating/share of 0.8/3.

When talking about Angie's death, Britt Robertson said for TV Guide, "I thought she would be the strong-willed woman who would get them all through being under the dome. I thought she would be a part in taking the dome down. But I think she was maybe a little too strong-willed and hotheaded. That got her into trouble." She also said that her character may come back, saying "I always like to think there's a possibility for anything with this show. I'm very open to coming back. There is always really cool story lines that they create with dead people. I'm hoping to get something in that world, where they bring me back, but I'm not quite Angie, you know?" Stephen King has a brief cameo in the episode, specifically interacting with Britt Robertson's character in the Sweetbriar Rose diner shortly before her demise — "Refill, Ange? Thanks, hon."

== Reception ==
The premiere was watched by 9.41 million American viewers and received an 18–49 rating/share of 2.1/7, down significantly from the series premiere and the first-season finale. However, despite falling in ratings, the show placed first in its timeslot and first for the night. Including DVR viewership, the premiere was watched by 13.20 million viewers and received an 18–49 rating of 3.2 three days after the original airing. The numbers from DVR viewing also improved from the series premiere in 2013, where 3.16 million viewers watched it compared to the 3.79 million for this episode.

The episode received generally mixed to negative reviews from critics. Carla Day of TV Fanatic gave the episode a 4.1 out of 5, saying, "As disappointing as the finale was, the follow-up was a mixed bag. I am intrigued by the new characters, reveals and see potential for season 2. The main issues I had with the episode had to do with the mess left from last season." She then continued to say "The addition of Sam and the new science teacher in place of Linda and Angie was a good decision. The deaths create a shift in the town's dynamics, while the two new characters have much to offer." David Hinckley of the Daily News gave the premiere a 3 out of 5, saying, "The supernatural show has evolved into a bit of a cartoon, but it's a fun one, especially since Stephen King himself wrote the season two opener."

Scott Von Doviak of The A.V. Club gave the episode a B− rating, saying, "There's goofy fun and then there's goofy dumb, and Under the Dome has proven itself capable of both varieties. Such was the case tonight. No visual on this show will ever match that opening night shot of the cow being sliced in half, but the sight of all the metal objects hurtling toward the dome and sticking there, culminating in Deputy Linda getting squished by her car five minutes into the new season, came close. This was a tragic moment, obviously, and I laughed out loud because it played like the show just couldn't get rid of the character quickly enough." He then commented positively on the scene in Norrie's house, saying, "The slapstick horror of the scene inside Norrie's house as she and her pals try to rescue her mother was vintage King, expertly directed by Jack Bender. The knives flying through the air, the nails pulling loose from the walls, the pots and pans whizzing over the kids' heads, and finally the house falling completely apart... it all worked as a very satisfying mini-movie: the perfect short subject before your next screening of Maximum Overdrive."

Matt Fowler of IGN gave the episode a 5 out of 10, signaling mixed to negative reviews. He mainly criticizing the episode's deaths, saying, "By killing off two (or more) characters in the premiere, Under the Dome is definitely going for a new 'no one is safe' vibe. Though it would help of any of the characters who were no longer safe were characters I actually care about. Plus, the dome can make anyone pop back up as a ghost-type thing so no one really leaves. And since everyone's so flat, it doesn't actually matter if we're seeing them 'alive' or 'dead.'" Marc Buxton of Den of Geek also gave the episode a mixed review, rating it a 2.5 out of 5, saying "So we kick things off with a mixed bag of seemingly needless character deaths and the introduction of new characters who are going to need a great deal of fleshing out to replace Linda and Angie. But Under the Dome proved itself last summer, and we look for more of the same despite a disjointed beginning."

Brian Lowry of Variety gave the episode a negative review, saying, "CBS pulled out all the stops to sex up the relaunch of Under the Dome — including a second-season premiere written by Stephen King — but at this point, attempts to keep the show interesting just bounce right off. Part of that has to do with a loose interpretation of the 'limited series' description leading up to last season's underwhelming cliffhanger, as well as a sense that while the characters remain trapped without an answer, viewers (at least, those who can find something else to occupy them between now and Labor Day) don't have to be."

Certain critics who gave the episode a negative review noted the show's excessive use of plot twists as an issue. Verne Gay, reviewing for Newsday, gave the episode a C+ grade, saying, "Some excellent special effects are in Monday night's episode, but nothing particularly shocking because it's become abundantly clear by now that the dome can do any damn thing the dome -- or the writers -- want. Twiddle its thumbs? Do a soft shoe? Rain down jelly beans? Whatever. Tonight, the dome brings back the dead, makes people faint and sucks up a bunch of metal stuff into one noisy crunch. [...] The problem with this sort of narrative stretch is that when the payoff finally arrives -- hopefully by season's end -- it's been upstaged or rendered irrelevant by all the plot flimflammery that preceded it." Chancellor Agard of Entertainment Weekly also said, "Those who tuned in tonight hoping for an Under the Dome that was less silly and provided more answers, less questions were probably disappointed by the episode's end. Under the Dome remains just as ridiculous (not in an endearing way) as ever—in its second season premiere, a lead character is killed off, new mysteries are introduced (because that's exactly what we need) along with new characters, and several pages out of Lost's playbook come into play."

Tim Surette of TV.com gave a scathing review of the episode, saying "Overall I thought this episode was lousy and made very little sense. I'm not sure it even had such aspirations. It was like a script was written in chunks by 12 different people who didn't read what the person before them wrote. But that's not only what I expect from Under the Dome, it's what I need. I couldn't be happier that this show is back. I just have one request: BRING BEN BACK NOW. This show is much harder to take without my stoner buddy."
