= The Enemy Within (Under the Dome) =

- Under the Dome episode
- Episode no.: Season 3 Episode 13
- Directed by: Peter Leto
- Written by: Neal Baer & Tim Schlattmann
- Original air date: September 10, 2015

Guest appearances
- Marg Helgenberger as Christine Price; Max Ehrich as Hunter May; Gia Mantegna as Lily Walters; Dann Florek as Colonel Walker; Vince Foster as Kyle Lee

Episode chronology
← Previous "Incandescence"	Next → —
- Under the Dome (season 3)

"The Enemy Within" is the thirteenth episode of the third season of the CBS drama Under the Dome and the thirty-ninth episode overall. It is both the season and the series finale. The episode aired on September 10, 2015.

The episode received negative reviews from critics. Upon airing, the episode was watched by 4.23 million viewers and received an 18–49 rating of 0.8.

== Plot ==
Following Christine's death, Dawn assumes the role of Queen of the Kinship. Sam advises her that there are tunnels at the cement factory that can lead them out of town. Jealous of Sam's position in the Kinship, Junior seeks to reclaim it. He and Sam fight aggressively resulting in Junior killing Sam.

The crystals are soon put in place and the transmitter is ready for use. Dawn activates the crystals but the egg is required and is not available. After taking her captive, Dawn tells Norrie that she can act as the egg since she's one of the four hands who first saw the "Pink Stars". Joe takes Norrie's place to protect her just as Dawn expected. After Joe triggers the transmitter, the Dome comes down.

Moments after the Dome disappears, after briefly appreciating their freedom, Julia and Big Jim attempt to kill Dawn but Junior attacks Jim before he can shoot her. During the fight Jim stabs Junior in the side while being strangled and is then forced to stab him again after Junior refuses to give up. Junior then dies in Big Jim's arms.

Dawn, in an attempt to escape, is cornered by Barbie in the cement factory, where he is tempted to let her fall to her death while the two of them balance on a wooden plank over a pit. Dawn tries to appeal to his human nature by reminding him that she is his daughter. It does not work as Barbie breaks the plank and they both fall into the pit. Barbie survives the fall, but after reuniting with Julia, all the inhabitants of Chester's Mill are taken away by the Army for testing.

Everyone not under the Kinship's influence is required to sign a statement that Hektor and Aktaion were responsible for the Dome and the actions inside it, despite Barbie, Julia, Norrie, Hunter, Lily and Big Jim all telling the officials the true story. Before he signs the agreement, Big Jim offers to fully sell the story if he is compensated "fairly".

One year later, Barbie begins to propose to Julia after a year of travelling on the road together, when they are interrupted and taken to meet with Congressman Big Jim. Hunter, now working for the NSA, has located Dawn alive and well in Omaha. Norrie, who has enlisted in the Army under the alias "Jenkins", locates Joe in a secure facility. He is quarantined from the outside world along with the other surviving members of the Kinship. Dawn stops three children before they touch a different egg. After they leave Dawn says, "We'll come back another time."

== Reception ==
=== Ratings ===
The episode aired on CBS on September 10, 2015. The episode was watched by 4.23 million viewers, with an 18–49 rating/share of 0.8/3. The episode is up in viewers from the previous episode, which received a 0.8 rating and 3.70 million viewers.

=== Critical reception ===
The episode received mostly negative reviews by critics. Matt Fowler of IGN gave the episode a negative review, saying "So this is where we leave things. With a horrid episode filled with utter nonsense and awful dialogue. Like we were watching a parody of an action/adventure series from SNL or some other late night comedy show." Scott Von Doviak of The A.V. Club wrote "Many questions raised over the past three seasons still remained to be answered in this final hour, but let’s face it: most of them were stupid and long-forgotten. The only real question left was whether Under The Dome could deliver one last head-scratching episode chock-full of ridiculousness. On that score, 'The Enemy Within' delivered the goods."

Jonathon Dornbush of Entertainment Weekly gave the episode a mostly negative review, saying "For a show that practically winked at the screen every other scene, Under the Dome didn’t end in such a ridiculous fashion. All things considered, the last moments of 'The Enemy Within', are unpredictably… simple, maybe even a little expected." Tim Surrette of TV.com gave the episode a negative review as well, saying the finale didn't answer the questions. "We never actually learned where the dome came from aside from some glowing egg. We never found out what the dome was for. We don't know where these aliens came from or why they needed to live on Earth. We don't know why Chester's Mill was chosen, and we don't know if there were more aliens coming. We just know that there was a dome that randomly popped up in a Stephen King-ian town in the Northeast."
