= Life in Color (film) =

- Directed by: Katharine Emmer
- Written by: Katharine Emmer
- Produced by: Katharine Emmer
- Starring: Josh McDermitt; Katharine Emmer
- Edited by: Katharine Emmer
- Release date: March 14, 2015 (SXSW)
- Country: United States
- Language: English

Life in Color is a 2015 American drama film starring Josh McDermitt and Katharine Emmer that had its world premiere at the 2015 South by Southwest film festival.

== Plot ==
Mary, an unemployed nanny, and Homer, a struggling stand-up comedian, are stuck house-sitting together and reluctantly end up helping each other.
