= Antiquities (film) =

2018 American comedy film

- Film poster
- Directed by: Daniel Campbell
- Written by: Daniel Campbell; Graham Gordy
- Produced by: Daniel Campbell; Graham Gordy; Jayme Lemons; Gary Newton; Kathryn Francis Tucker
- Starring: Andrew J. West; Michaela Watkins; Michael Gladis; Ashley Greene; Mary Steenburgen
- Cinematography: Gabe Mayhan
- Edited by: Robin Gonsalves
- Music by: Jesse Ingalls; Jason Mozersky
- Production company: Mortuus Pater Pictures
- Distributed by: The Industry & Company; The Orchard
- Release dates: June 16, 2018 (Dances With Films); January 25, 2019 (United States)
- Running time: 93 minutes
- Country: United States
- Language: English

Antiquities is a 2018 American comedy film directed by Daniel Campbell and starring Andrew J. West, Michaela Watkins, Michael Gladis, Ashley Greene and Mary Steenburgen.

== Cast ==
- Andrew J. West as Walt
- Ashley Greene as Ellie
- Michaela Watkins as Dolores Jr.
- Roger Scott as Blundale
- Graham Gordy as Jimmy Lee
- Melanie Haynes as Aunt Patty
- Natalie Canerday as Estate Sale Customer
- Michael Gladis as Delaney
- Ingrid Haas as Sarah
- Jennifer Pierce Mathus as Crazy Girls Waitress
- David Bazzel as Delivery Man
- Mary Steenburgen as Dr. Margot
- Troy Hogan as Dewey Ray

== Reception ==
The film has a 100% rating on Rotten Tomatoes, based on five reviews with an average rating of 7.3/10.
