= Infestation (Under the Dome) =

- Under the Dome episode
- Episode no.: Season 2 Episode 2
- Directed by: Ernest Dickerson
- Written by: Kelly Souders & Brian Peterson
- Original air date: July 7, 2014

Guest appearances
- Grace Victoria Cox as Melanie Cross; Dale Raoul as Andrea Grinnell; Matt McHugh as Farmer Killian

Episode chronology
← Previous "Heads Will Roll"	Next → "Force Majeure"
- Under the Dome (season 2)

"Infestation" is the second episode of the second season of the CBS drama series Under the Dome, and the fifteenth episode overall. The episode premiered on July 7, 2014.

The episode received mixed reviews from critics, though some commented positively calling it an improvement from the second-season premiere.

== Plot ==
Having been spared by the Dome, James "Big Jim" Rennie (Dean Norris) starts to have a change of heart from the previous mindset of himself being most important to being generally helpful towards the entire town. Residents start to trust him considerably more, thinking of him as a hero for attempting to sacrifice himself.

After a caterpillar infestation begins to take control of all the town's crops Rebecca Pine (Karla Crome) takes action by burning fields, and later enlists the help of Big Jim and Dale "Barbie" Barbara (Mike Vogel) to use an old crop-duster to spray the fields with pesticides. This nearly sees the demise of Barbie as fuel runs low on the airplane. Big Jim saves his life by revealing a secret reserve tank, enabling Barbie to land safely, solidifying Jim's status of hero.

Following Angie McAlister's (Britt Robertson) murder, there is a manhunt for the person responsible for the crime. Initially, the girl (Grace Victoria Cox) who was rescued by Julia Shumway (Rachelle Lefevre) is the main suspect, as her shoe-print was found near the crime scene in a puddle of blood. Jim and James "Junior" Rennie (Alexander Koch) both suspect each other initially. When Joe McAlister (Colin Ford) tells Junior about the shoe-print and that the girl was arrested they head to the jail cell to murder this mysterious stranger. However it is soon discovered that it was a man who did the deed. Julia and Sam Verdreaux (Eddie Cahill) find bruising on Angie's arm — large, widely spaced fingerprints only a man could have inflicted. Junior is unable to shoot the girl but Joe is ready to before being stopped by Julia and Sam. Junior later heads to his Uncle Sam's shack to reveal that the previous night he had been drunk and blacked out. He later found Angie's bracelet under his cot and believes he may have been the man who killed Angie.

== Reception ==
The episode was watched by 7.70 million American viewers and received an 18–49 rating/share of 1.7/5, marking series lows for ratings and viewership. The show placed first in its timeslot and third for the night, falling behind MasterChef and The Bachelorette. Including DVR viewership the episode was watched by a total of 11.21 million viewers and attained an 18–49 rating of 2.7. Further research indicated that 12.08 million viewers watched the episode.

Much like the previous episode, this episode received generally mixed to negative reviews from critics.

Chancellor Agard of Entertainment Weekly gave the episode a positive review compared to the previous episode, saying it "makes up for where the season premiere failed because there are moments that do a fairly good job of setting up this season's conflicts and viewer expectations." Marc Buxton of Den of Geek gave the episode a moderate review, giving a 3 out of 5, saying "Things are going to get biblical in Chester’s Mill, huh? Ok, I can deal with that. This week’s episode didn’t bring the locusts, but it did bring an infestation of caterpillars in the first of the plagues the residents of Chester’s Mill must face in the coming weeks. It’s all good as the second installment of season two was much more cohesive and controlled than last week’s premiere, making this episode mostly a winner."

Matt Fowler of IGN gave the episode a 5.2 out of 10, signaling mixed reviews, saying

Under the Dome continued along with its paper-thin, on-the-nose "science vs. faith" story - absurdly represented on both sides. We got a threat that never felt like a true threat and a couple of citizens once again leaping to conclusions and trying to take the law, or at least retribution, into their own hands. It was at least good to know that Big Jim hadn't completely shed his egomaniac ways since he stands out as one of the only series regulars to not be given arbitrary motivations from one episode to the next. It's almost a shame that they pulled the villain card so early with him back in Season 1 and now have to rein him back in.

Scott Von Doviak of The A.V. Club gave the episode a C− rating, saying "Only two episodes into the season, Under The Dome is already back in Crisis-of-the-Week mode. The butterflies are reproducing too quickly because of, oh, let’s say magnets, and the caterpillars they hatch are devouring all the crops, which they wouldn’t normally do, except...magnets. (Cue Insane Clown Posse scratching their heads.) Who needs a reason, really? The answer is always 'that’s what the dome wanted,' even if no two people can agree on what it is the dome actually wants."
