= Josh McDermitt =

American actor (born 1978)

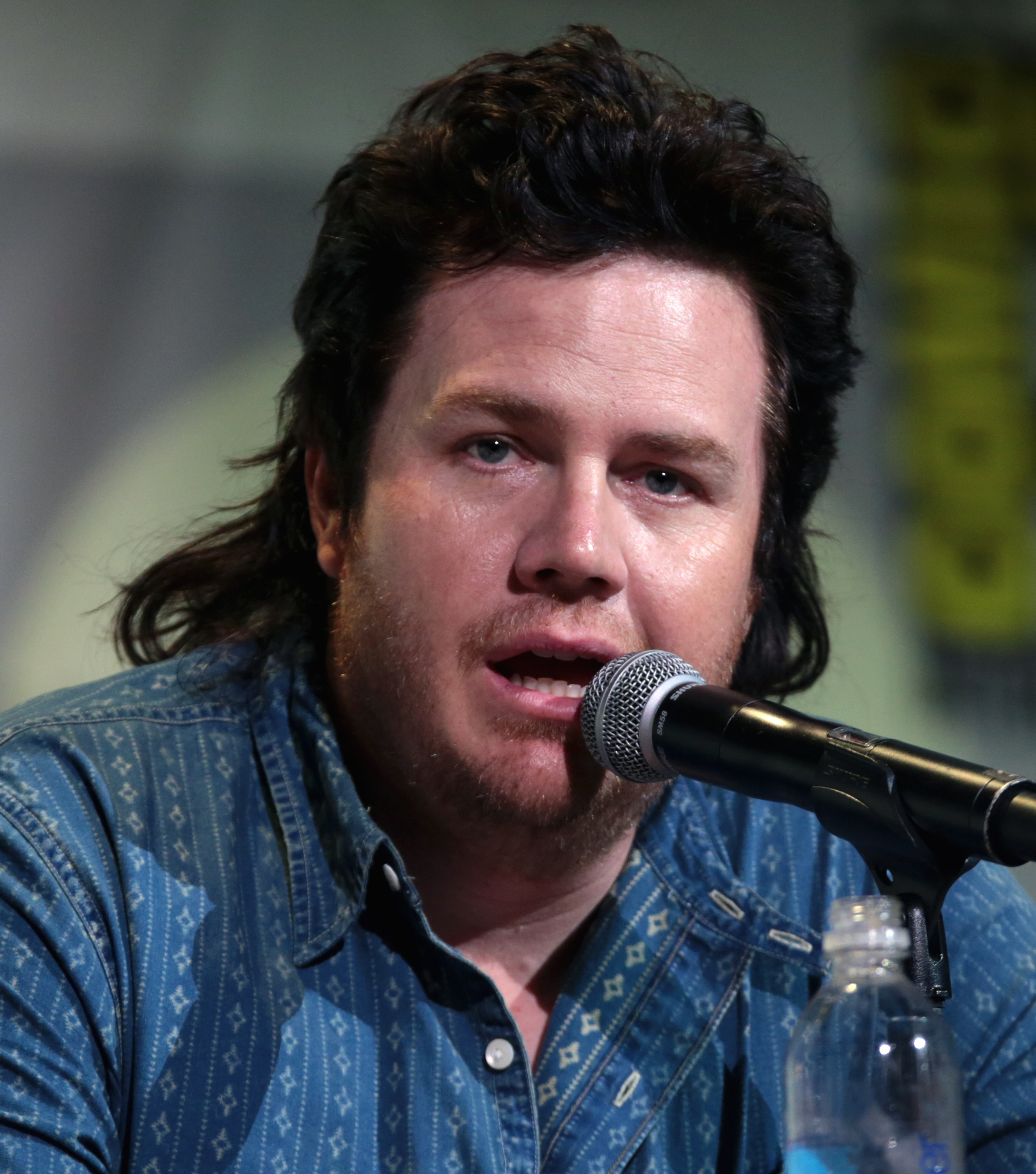
- McDermitt at the 2016 San Diego Comic-Con
- Born: June 4, 1978 (age 48); Phoenix, Arizona, U.S.
- Occupations: Actor, comedian
- Notable work: Eugene Porter in The Walking Dead
- Website: www.joshmcdermitt.com

Josh McDermitt (born June 4, 1978) is an American actor and comedian. He is best known for playing Eugene Porter on AMC's The Walking Dead. In 2006, McDermitt appeared on Last Comic Standing as a contestant. McDermitt had a main role on the sitcom Retired at 35 from 2011 to 2012, playing the character Brandon.

== Early life ==
McDermitt was born on June 4, 1978, in Phoenix, Arizona. He resides in Los Angeles, California, where he is a member of the improvisational comedy group Robert Downey Jr Jr.

== Career ==
McDermitt began his career in entertainment by calling in to a local radio show in Phoenix, Tim & Willy, at a young age. Calling in routinely, under the guise of different voices, McDermitt kept listeners and Tim & Willy entertained. Not long afterward, he began working with them as a producer, following them to both KNIX & KMLE.

McDermitt was a semi-finalist in the fourth season of Last Comic Standing. He played the role of Larry in the 2009 TV movie Rehab for Rejects. McDermitt then starred in the TV Land sitcom Retired at 35, playing the role of Brandon. The show ran for two seasons from 2011–2012, before being canceled.

In October 2013, it was announced by producers that McDermitt had been cast as Eugene Porter, a character from The Walking Dead comic book, for the fourth season of the TV series of the same name. He was a main cast member from the fifth until the eleventh and final season. In February 2024, it was revealed that McDermitt was cast in the new NBC pilot Suits LA as Stuart Lane, the partner of Stephen Amell's Ted Black.

== Filmography ==
Year	Title	Role	Notes
2006	Last Comic Standing	Himself/Comedian	
2009	Rehab for Rejects	Larry	TV movie
2009	Madison Hall	Derek Rightman	
2010	Iron Man 2 Table Read	Jon Favreau	Video short
2010	The Pitch	Eric	Short
2011–2012	Retired at 35	Brandon	Main role
2012	King of Van Nuys	Event Official	TV movie
2012	Work It	Quiz Emcee/Manager	Episodes: Pilot, Girl Fight
2013	The Third Wheel	Mark	Short
2014	Headshots and Handcuffs	Captain Collins	TV short
2014	Mad Men	George Payton	
2014–2022	The Walking Dead	Eugene Porter	Recurring role (season 4), also Starring (seasons 5–7), main (season 7–11); 85 episodes
2015	Life in Color	Homer	
2016	Hell's Kitchen	Himself	Episode: "Spoon Fed"
2016	Middle Man	T-Bird	
2017	Twin Peaks	Casino Patron	
2017	Robot Chicken	Eugene Porter (voice)	Episode: "The Robot Chicken Walking Dead Special: Look Who's Walking"
2019	The Kids Are Alright	Mr. Crane	
2021	Creepshow	Harlan King	Episode: "Pesticide"
2024	Lilly	Dan McGinty	
2025	Suits LA	Stuart Lane	Main role
2025	The Righteous Gemstones	Abel Grieves	Season 4 Episode 1 "Prelude"
2025	Killing Faith	Stanton	

=== Video games ===
Year	Title	Role	Notes
2020	The Walking Dead: Onslaught	Eugene Porter	Voice
