= Andrew J. West =

American actor

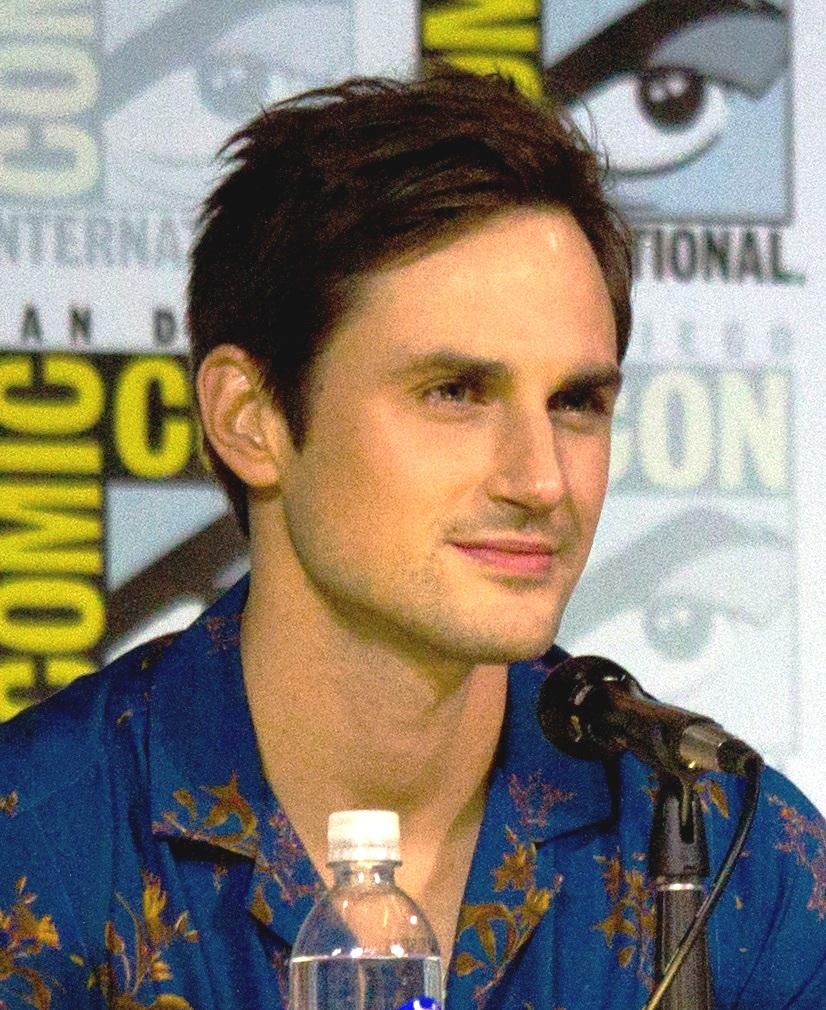
- West in 2017
- Born: November 22, 1983 (age 42)
- Education: Indiana University Bloomington
- Occupation: Actor
- Years active: 2006–present
- Spouse: Amber Stevens (m. 2014)
- Children: 3
- Relatives: Shadoe Stevens (father-in-law)

Andrew J. West (born November 22, 1983) is an American actor who is best known for his roles as Fisher in Greek and Gareth in The Walking Dead. He appeared as a guest star in the fourth-season finale, and was promoted to a series regular for the fifth season. His performance earned him a Saturn Award for Best Guest Starring Role on Television nomination. He also portrayed the adult Henry Mills on the final season of Once Upon a Time.

== Personal life ==
West began dating actress Amber Stevens after they met on the television show Greek. They married on December 5, 2014, in Los Angeles. They have three daughters: Ava Laverne, born on October 7, 2018, Winona Marie, born on July 29, 2021, and Bernadette Maxine, born on September 3, 2024.

== Filmography ==
=== Films ===
Year	Title	Role	Notes
2006	The Last Night	Joe Pinski	Short film
2006	On Being-in-and-of the Classroom	Business	Short film
2007	Onionhead	Guy	Short film
2008	Cinco de Mayo	Scott	Short film
2009	Dialogues	Dustin Hoffman	
2009	Coup de Grace	Chris	Short film
2009	Nothing for Something	Lyle	Short film
2010	Walter	Walter Benjamin	Short film
2012	The Distance Between	Ian	Short film
2014	Nightmare Code	Brett Desmond	
2014	Bipolar	Harry Poole / Edward Grey	
2015	Walter	Walter	
2016	Middle Man	Hitch	
2016	Rebirth	J.R	Netflix
2018	Antiquities	Walt	
2022	So Cold the River	Josiah Bradford	

=== Television ===
Year	Title	Role	Notes
2008–09	Privileged	Max	4 episodes
2008	Rita Rocks	Craiger	Episode: "Flirting with Disaster"
2009–10	Greek	Fisher	Recurring role; 12 episodes
2009	Bones	Josh Parsons	Episode: "The Man In The Chicken Farm"
2009	Ghost Whisperer	Jake Olmstead	Episode: "Excessive Forces"
2010	Nip/Tuck	Young Christian	Episode: "Dan Daly"
2010	CSI: NY	Johnny Cook	Episode: "Unusual Suspects"
2010	Dark Blue	Reid Wagner	Episode: "Liar's Poker"
2010	CSI: Crime Scene Investigation	Pitchman Larry	Episode: "Bump and Grind"
2010	$#*! My Dad Says	Dr. Ted Barron	Episode: "Family Dinner for Schmucks"
2010	Who Gets the Parents	Mitch	Television film
2010	Greek Chapter 4: At World's End	Himself	
2011	Family Practice	Adam Foote	Television film
2011	The Whole Truth		Episode: "The End"
2011	Body of Proof	Shane Matthews	Episode: "Gross Anatomy"
2012	Castle	Keith	Episode: "Swan Song"
2014	Suburgatory	Mark	Episode: "I'm Just Not That Into Me"
2014	Talking Dead	Himself / Gareth	Episodes: "Season Preview Special", "Four Walls and a Roof"
2014	The Walking Dead	Gareth	4 episodes
2014	Hot in Cleveland	Cooper	Episode: "Fear and Loathing in Los Angeles"
2015	Last Call with Carson Daly	Himself	Episode: "Regina King/Andrew J. West & Anna Mastro/Sweat Lodge"
2015	Justified	Waiter	Episode: "Trust"
2015	Under the Dome	Pete Blackwell	Episodes: "The Kinship", "Alaska"
2015	Minority Report	Cayman Bello	Episode: "Fredi"
2016	Dead of Summer	Damon Crowley	6 episodes
2017–18	Once Upon a Time	Henry Mills	Guest role (season 6); main role (season 7); 23 episodes
2017	The Guest Book	Tommy	Episode: "Story Seven"
2022	Promised Land	Michael Paxton	6 episodes

=== Other works ===
Year	Title	Notes
2006	The Last Night	Writer/producer
2006	On Being-in-and-of the Classroom	Writer/director/editor/producer
