= Magdalena Zyzak =

Polish filmmaker and writer

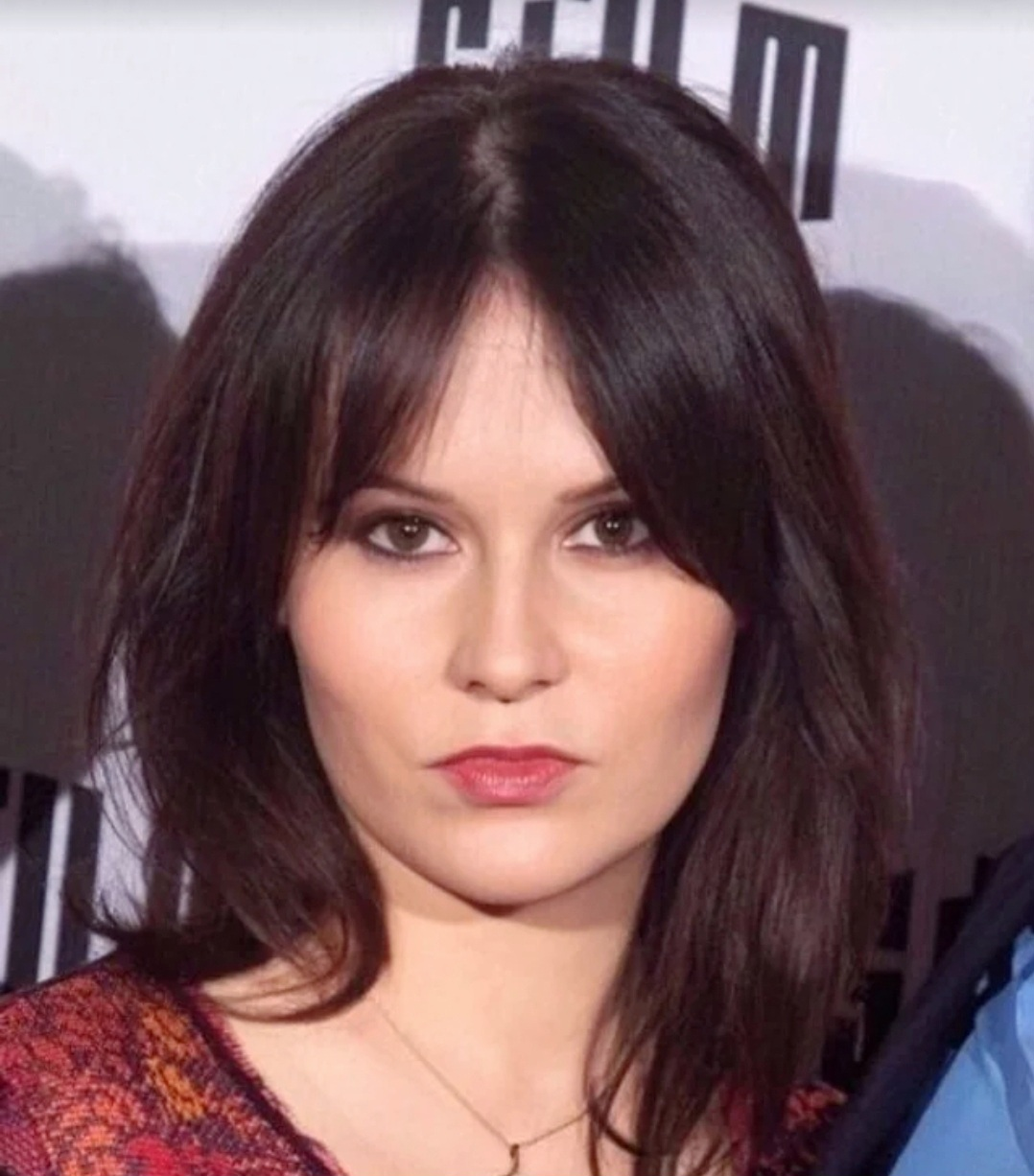
- Zyzak in 2019
- Born: Magdalena Zyzak; 1983 (age 42–43); Zabrze, Poland
- Education: Columbia University (MFA, 2010); University of Southern California (BA, 2006)
- Occupations: Director, Novelist
- Writing career
- Language: English

Magdalena Zyzak (born 1983) is a Polish filmmaker and novelist. Her directorial debut, Maya Dardel, premiered in the Narrative Competition at the 2017 South by Southwest Film Festival and was acquired by Samuel Goldwyn Films and Orion Pictures. She went on to direct The Wall of Mexico, which premiered at South by Southwest in 2019, and then When I'm a Moth. Zyzak's first novel, The Ballad of Barnabas Pierkiel, was published by Henry Holt in 2014. Zyzak's second novel, The Lady Waiting, was published by Penguin Random House in 2024.

== Early life and education ==
Zyzak was born in 1983 in Zabrze, Poland. In 2002, she moved to the US to study film production and literature at the University of Southern California. After producing the feature film Redland, Magdalena attended Columbia University's graduate program in creative writing and received an MFA.

== Career ==
Zyzak's first feature film, produced and co-written with director Asiel Norton, Redland, a wilderness drama, was nominated for an Independent Spirit Award and was picked as one of the Top Fourteen Films of the Year by Hammer to Nail. She went on to produce a second feature film directed by Asiel Norton, Orion, a post-apocalyptic fable, shot in the ruins of Detroit, starring David Arquette, Lily Cole and Goran Kostic. In 2016, she shifted from producing to directing and teamed up with Zachary Cotler to found The Winter Film Company. Zyzak's first film as a director, Maya Dardel, starring Lena Olin, Jordan Gavaris, Alexander Koch, Nathan Keyes, and Rosanna Arquette, was released in 2017. Zyzak and filmmaking partner Zachary Cotler received Best Screenplay for Maya Dardel at the Prague Independent Film Festival and Best Director for Maya Dardel at the 2017 Raindance Film Festival. Zyzak has been honored by the national foundation Teraz Polska as an outstanding cultural figure of the Polish community abroad. Her most recent film stars Addison Timlin as the young Hillary Clinton.

== Filmography ==
- Maya Dardel (2017)
- The Wall of Mexico (2019)
- When I'm a Moth (2019)

== Bibliography ==
- The Ballad of Barnabas Pierkiel (2014)
- The Lady Waiting (2024)
