= Zachary Cotler =

American filmmaker, poet, and novelist

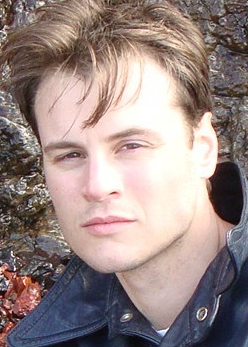
- Born: Theodore Zachary Cotler; 1981 (age 44–45); Passaic, New Jersey, United States
- Education: Iowa Writers Workshop (MFA, 2008); Cornell University (BA, 2003)
- Occupations: Poet, Novelist, Director
- Writing career
- Language: English
- Website: zacharycotler.com

Theodore Zachary Cotler (born 1981) is an American filmmaker, poet, and novelist. His first film, Maya Dardel, premiered in the Narrative Competition at the 2017 South by Southwest Film Festival and was acquired by Samuel Goldwyn Films and Orion Pictures. His second film, The Wall of Mexico, premiered at South by Southwest in 2019. A third film, When I'm a Moth, came out shortly after the second. He won the 2012 Sawtooth Poetry Prize for Sonnets to the Humans and the 2014 Colorado Prize for Poetry for Supplice. In 2011, the Poetry Foundation awarded him the Ruth Lilly Fellowship.

== Early life and education ==
Cotler spent his childhood in Marin County, California. He graduated from Cornell University in 2003 with a B.A. in English. In 2008, he received his MFA in poetry from the Iowa Writers Workshop.

== Career ==
In 2009, Cotler founded The Winter Anthology at winteranthology.com with Michael Rutherglen, Olivia Clare, and Brandon Krieg. Cotler continues to spearhead and edit the anthology. His first book of poems, House with a Dark Sky Roof, was published in 2011. In 2012, Heather McHugh picked Cotler as the winner of the Sawtooth Prize, and in 2013, Ahsahta Press published Sonnets to the Humans, a cycle of 49 sonnets (the first of a projected trilogy of such sequences). Supplice, the second book of sonnets, was picked as the winner of the 2014 Colorado Prize for Poetry by Claudia Keelan. Cotler's first novel Ghost at the Loom was published in 2014. Cotler's first film, Maya Dardel, starring Lena Olin, Jordan Gavaris, Alexander Koch, Nathan Keyes, and Rosanna Arquette, was released in 2017. Cotler and filmmaking partner Magdalena Zyzak received Best Screenplay for Maya Dardel at the Prague Independent Film Festival and Best Director for Maya Dardel at the 2017 Raindance Film Festival.

== Filmography ==
- Maya Dardel (2017)
- The Wall of Mexico (2019)
- When I'm a Moth (2019)

== Bibliography ==
Fiction

Ghost at the Loom (2014)

Poetry

Supplice (2014)

Sonnets to the Humans (2013)

House with a Dark Sky Roof (2011)

Criticism

Elegies for Humanism (2015)
