= Pat Scola =

American cinematographer

Pat Scola is an American cinematographer.

== Life and career ==
A native of New York, Scola developed his interest in photography during his high school days and working in its darkroom. Scola would go on to attend Emerson College, graduating in 2008.

Scola worked as cinematographer for several music videos from artists such as The Weeknd and J. Cole.

For his work on the film Pig (2021) directed by Michael Sarnoski, Scola received critical acclaim, and was awarded the American Society of Cinematographers Spotlight Award. Scola would collaborate with Sanorski again on A Quiet Place: Day One (2024), and The Death of Robin Hood (2026). Additional credits include Monsters and Men (2018), We Grown Now (2023), for which he earned a nomination for the Independent Spirit Award for Best Cinematography, and Sing Sing (2023), earning a nomination for the San Diego Film Critics Society Award for Best Cinematography.

== Filmography ==
Year	Title	Director	Notes
2015	A Beautiful Now	Daniela Amavia	Credited as Patrick Scola
2016	Southside with You	Richard Tanne	
2017	Maya Dardel	Zachary Cotler; Magdalena Zyzak	Credited as Patrick Scola
2017	And Then I Go	Vincent Grashaw	Credited as Patrick Scola
2018	Monsters and Men	Reinaldo Marcus Green	
2021	Pig	Michael Sarnoski	1st of 3 collaborations with Sarnoski
2021	Mother/Android	Mattson Tomlin	Credited as Patrick Scola
2023	We Grown Now	Minhal Baig	
2023	Sing Sing	Greg Kwedar	
2024	A Quiet Place: Day One	Michael Sarnoski	
2025	Lurker	Alex Russell	
2026	The Death of Robin Hood	Michael Sarnoski	
