= The Death of Robin Hood (soundtrack) =

2026 film soundtrack album

The Death of Robin Hood (Original Soundtrack)

Film score by Jim Ghedi
- Released: June 19, 2026
- Recorded: 2026
- Genre: Film score
- Length: 48:11
- Label: A24 Music
- Producer: Jim Ghedi

The Death of Robin Hood (Original Soundtrack) is the film score to the 2026 film The Death of Robin Hood directed by Michael Sarnoski and starring Hugh Jackman, Jodie Comer, Bill Skarsgård, Murray Bartlett and Noah Jupe. The score is composed by English folk musician Jim Ghedi in his feature film scoring debut and the album consisted of 14 tracks released through A24 Music on June 19, 2026.

== Development ==
The Death of Robin Hood is the feature film scoring debut of folk musician Jim Ghedi, who replaced Sarnoski's past collaborator Alexis Grapsas. Sarnoski listened to Ghedi's album Wasteland (2025) and messaged him through Instagram to express his interest for Ghedi to score the film. Despite having not worked in a feature film before, he accepted Sarnoski's offer and discussed about the film's soundscape through Zoom calls. Ghedi said that Sarnoski liked the works of the folk rock band Steeleye Span while Ghedi liked the folk song Twa Corbies, which furthered their interest on exploring ancient folk music. He liked the idea of Robin Hood presented in a modern way, taking away the folklore, myth and legend and being mostly a human story, according to Ghedi.

Ghedi received the completed footages from Tony Lewis to score the film and could feel the images being presented in his maiden scoring stint. While he was offered to visit California, he chose to work in Sheffield owing to his comfort with the musicians there, and had a friendly association with nyckelharpa player Rob and a hurdy-gurdy player there, so that it could help him while scoring a full-fledged historical film and have them collaborate on the score as well. The finished material was described to be "quite doomy, earthy and dark [while also being] quite light and orchestrated".

== Reception ==
John Marinakis of Sputnikmusic wrote "This is a brilliant work of folk composition, deeply moving both within the film and as an album in its own right." Tim Grierson of Screen International wrote "Jim Ghedi's folk-tinged score, including occasional bellowed vocals, adds to the feeling of a mournful, intimate epic about regret and rebirth." David Ehrlich of IndieWire wrote "Jim Ghedi's wheezing score giv[es] way to less suffocating tones". Mark Keizer of MovieWeb wrote "composer Jim Ghedi's otherwise beautifully textured score go[es] too far when it adds vocals".

Ian Freer of Time Out called it a "brooding folk" score. Katie Walsh of The Detroit News said "the score of largely traditional Celtic music by Jim Ghedi is easily one of the best of the year". Pete Hammond of Deadline Hollywood wrote "Impressive also is the score from Tony Lewis and folk singer Jim Ghedi, including the uniquely haunting vocals from the latter." Chris Evangelista of /Film wrote that Ghedi's score "blends folk songs full of longing with low, sorrowful strings."

== Track listing ==
No.	Title	Length
1.	"Farm Attack"	3:11
2.	"Bold Pedlar"	1:39
3.	"Twa Corbies"	3:50
4.	"Red Like the Setting Summer Sun"	0:57
5.	"Lamentations of Round-Oak Waters"	5:53
6.	"Elderfather Fight"	7:43
7.	"Boat to the Priory"	1:50
8.	"What Will Become of England"	4:18
9.	"Walking Again"	4:46
10.	"Sister Brigid's Family"	3:25
11.	"Making Arrows"	1:37
12.	"Searching for Little Margaret"	2:33
13.	"I Owe This Life to You"	3:09
14.	"Robin's Death"	3:20
Total length:		48:11
