= Aziz Tazi =

Moroccan film director and producer

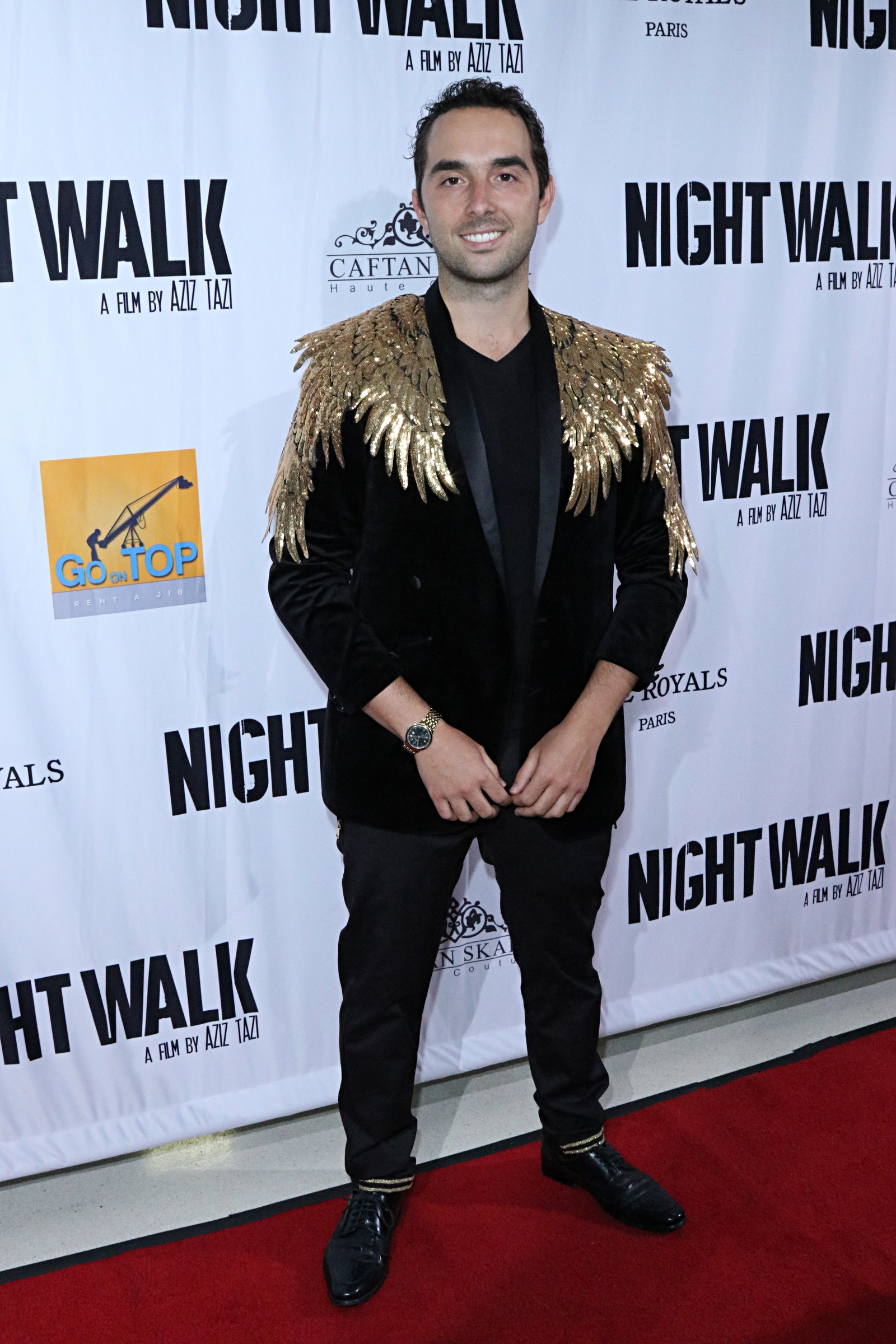
- Tazi in 2021
- Born: Casablanca, Morocco
- Education: University of California, Berkeley; Ecole Centrale Paris
- Occupations: Film director, producer, and screenwriter
- Years active: 2004–present
- Notable work: Night Walk

Aziz Tazi is a Moroccan screenwriter, director and producer who appeared in a Forbes Africa's 30 Under 30 list. Tazi made his directorial debut with the feature film Night Walk. The crime drama was acquired by Lionsgate and is the first Moroccan film to get Hollywood distribution.

Prior to Night Walk, Tazi's short film Imago opened the Arab Film Festival in 2013. His documentary Arab Stories aired on PBS in 2014. Tazi has also directed music videos for French rapper La Fouine. Variety and The Huffington Post have covered his work as well.

== Early life ==
Aziz Tazi grew up in Casablanca, Morocco. At 14, he used Adobe Premiere Pro and Adobe After Effects, along with 3D Studio Max to create 15-min short videos based on the game Counter-Strike. The videos went viral and some were awarded "Best Visual Effects" and "Most Innovative" by a gaming website after he turned 15.

At age 17, Tazi moved to France and worked with Denis Freyd on Les Cinq Parties du Monde directed by Gerard Mordillat. Eventually, Tazi settled in California after graduating with two Masters of Science from Ecole Centrale Paris and UC Berkeley.

== Career ==
In 2011, Tazi directed a documentary short called "Emilie" about France's first-ever female Olympic champion in gymnastics Emilie Le Pennec. The short won the "Orange Reporter" Award for Highest Achievement in Creativity.

In 2012, he received funding from his engineering school Ecole Centrale Paris and French bank BNP Paribas to direct and produce his first narrative short Imago. This psychological thriller opened the Arab Film Festival in Los Angeles in 2013. In 2013, while attending the University of California at Berkeley, he made a documentary about successful Arab leaders in the U.S. called "Arab Stories: Bay Area," which aired on PBS.

After working as a creative director for the Center for Entrepreneurship and Technology, working to make UC Berkeley's entrepreneurship education available online, Tazi moved to Los Angeles where he became the festival manager of the Arab Film Festival. He has been featured on the cover of Morocco's Challenge magazine.

Tazi also worked on his first feature film Night Walk as director. The film had its World Premiere at the Moscow International Film Festival in April 2019. Later that year, Tazi won the "Best Screenplay" award at the Prague Independent Film Festival. In a 2019 interview with Piers Morgan on Good Morning Britain, Mickey Rourke spoke of his experience working with Tazi, praising "the enthusiasm of this guy who was only 28" and added that “he wasn't terrified to work with me, he was just very excited to work with me."

== Recognition ==
In 2013, Tazi was voted among "Top 50 Men of the Year 2013" by VH Magazine.

Tazi was included on Forbes Africa's 30 Under 30 in 2016 as a leading change-maker under the age of 30.

In 2021, Spectrum News aired a 2-min segment on Tazi's work as a director challenging the stereotypes around the Arab and Muslim community in the West that played nationwide every hour for a day. The Washington Post and Entertainment Weekly also included his film Night Walk in their "Movies to Stream this Week" list.

== Filmography ==
=== Features ===
- Night Walk (2021)

=== Shorts ===
- Emilie (2011)
- Imago (2013)
- Arab Stories (2014)
- The Passing (2014)

=== Music videos ===
- "Stop" by Imad Kotbi featuring Ryan McTogy (2017)
- "Love & Devotion" by Imad Kotbi featuring Ryan McTogy (2017)
- "African Queen" by La Fouine (2018)
- "Daqqat Qelbi (My Heartbeat)" by Ghita Lahmamssi (2019)

== Awards and nominations ==
Year	Award	Nominated Work	Category	Role	Result
2011	Orange Reporter	Emilie	Highest Achievement in Creativity	Director/Producer	Won
2013	Arab Film Festival	Imago	Festival Prize	Writer/Director/Producer	Nominated
2019	Moscow International Film Festival	Night Walk	Audience Award	Writer/Director/Producer	Nominated
2019	Prague Independent Film Festival	Night Walk	Best Screenplay	Director/Producer	Won
2019	Prague Independent Film Festival	Night Walk	Best Director	Writer/Director/Producer	Nominated
2019	Prague Independent Film Festival	Night Walk	Golden Eagle / Grand Prix	Director/Producer	Nominated
