= The Winter Anthology =

Annual collection of literature

- Editor: Zachary Cotler, Michael Rutherglen, Lee Posna
- Categories: Poetry, Fiction, Nonfiction
- Frequency: Annual
- Founder: Zachary Cotler, Michael Rutherglen, Brandon Krieg, Olivia Clare Friedman
- First issue: December 2009
- Company: The Winter Anthology
- Country: United States
- Based in: Brooklyn, New York, USA
- Language: English
- Website: www.winteranthology.com

The Winter Anthology, published online since 2009, is an annual collection of literature. It has a very particular, consistent editorial vision, informed by an elegiac perspective on the humanities. The editors call this perspective: "A will to sustain the analog humanities as long as possible without naïveté regarding their eclipse by newer paradigms."

Michael Rutherglen writes: "The project is a vehicle for writings that continue to privilege density, precision... sensitivity to the numinous. The editors contend that nowhere else in print or on the web can such a concentration of these particular values be found... writings collected in The Winter Anthology are neither sentimental atavisms nor naïve attempts at reconstruction. Rather, they are elegies for art and artists, some explicit, many more implicit..."

The anthology has published such poets as Yves Bonnefoy, Lucie Brock-Broido, Jack Gilbert, and Charles Wright, such critics as Bruno Latour, Roberto Calasso, and Jean Baudrillard, and such fiction writers as Karl Ove Knausgård and Magdalena Tulli.

== History ==
The anthology was founded in 2009 by Zachary Cotler, Michael Rutherglen, Olivia Clare Friedman, and Brandon Krieg. Lee Posna joined the editors in 2016. The anthology has held an annual writing contest since 2011.

== See also ==
- List of literary magazines
