= Night Walk (film) =

2019 American film

- Film poster
- Directed by: Aziz Tazi
- Written by: Aziz Tazi
- Produced by: Tatyana Bulgakova; Alex Cooray; Ivana Nguyen; Aziz Tazi; Mostapha Mellouk
- Starring: Sean Stone; Mickey Rourke; Sarah Alami; La Fouine; Eric Roberts; Louis Mandylor; Patrick Kilpatrick; Richard Tyson
- Cinematography: Imad Rhayem
- Music by: Youness Hamidi
- Production companies: Lena River Productions; Global Media Africa; Casablanca Media Partners
- Release dates: April 22, 2019 (Moscow); August 5, 2019 (Prague); June 15, 2021 (U.S.)
- Country: United States
- Language: English

Night Walk is an American crime thriller drama film written and directed by Aziz Tazi and starring Sean Stone, Mickey Rourke, Sarah Alami, French rapper La Fouine and Eric Roberts. The film is a modern-day Romeo and Juliet between the West and the Middle East that turns into a crime drama. In the film, a hero's quest for justice evolves into a spiritual journey led by Muslim inmates, from the moderate convert to terror-linked fundamentalists. Night Walk was shot between Los Angeles and five cities in Morocco. It premiered at the 2019 Moscow International Film Festival. In 2021, Night Walk was acquired by Lionsgate, making it the first Moroccan film in history to get Hollywood distribution.

== Plot ==
Frank is a bachelor who has no plan of being tied down, that is until he meets Sarah. Sarah, an Arab woman from another country, changes Frank's perspective on love. Frank, who never wanted to settle down, falls for Sarah and they develop a love that will soon be forbidden. On the evening of Frank's planned proposal in Sarah's homeland, they decide to take a walk around town, when they get themselves into a violent scuffle with local corrupt police that ends in Sarah being killed. Scared of the international backlash, the police instantly frame Frank for the murder of Sarah. Helped by a corrupt American judge, Frank gets sent to prison where he immediately gets brutally beaten. Frank soon meets a Muslim inmate that takes him under his wing and guides him to get justice. While Frank is trying to prove his innocence, he continues to get shut down by the crooked judge who has other devious intentions. Frank now has to deal with the loss of his beloved girlfriend while battling for his innocence with a corrupt justice system.

== Cast ==
- Sean Stone as Frank
- Mickey Rourke as Gary
- Sarah Alami as Sarah Alami
- La Fouine as Ayman
- Eric Roberts as Judge Jude
- Louis Mandylor as The Prison Warden
- Patrick Kilpatrick as Louis
- Richard Tyson as John
- Ricco Ross as Saud
- Tom Lister Jr. as Kareem
- Aziz Tazi as Malik

== Release ==
The film was first screened at the 2019 Moscow International Film Festival and at the 2019 Prague Independent Film Festival. On June 10, 2021, the film had a limited theatrical release in Russia in 250 screens. In the same month, the film was released on DVD and Blu-ray formats in the United States, the U.K., Denmark, Finland, Iceland, Norway, and Sweden. It will also get a 2021 release in Germany, the Indian subcontinent, Latin America, Portugal, Turkey, and all of Eastern Europe.

== Reception ==
=== Accolades ===
The film received the Best Screenplay award for Aziz Tazi and Best Actor award for Mickey Rourke at the 2019 Prague Independent Film Festival. Spectrum News 1 aired a 2-min segment on director Aziz Tazi's mission to challenge stereotypes about the Arab and Muslim community, that played nationwide every hour for an entire day. Variety and The Huffington Post have covered the film as well. Both The Washington Post and Entertainment Weekly included Night Walk in their "Movies to Stream this week" list.

The Russian trade Kinoreporter called Night Walk "a breath of fresh air" in their review of MIFF screened films while in the U.K., Creature Feature Corner said it was "Mickey Rourke's best performance since Iron Man 2". During an interview of Mickey Rourke on national British TV with Piers Morgan (Good Morning Britain), the BAFTA and Golden Globe-winning actor spoke highly of his experience working with director Aziz Tazi praising "the enthusiasm of this guy who was only 28" and saying about Tazi: “he wasn't terrified to work with me, he was just very excited to work with me.".
