= The Sinking of Sozopol =

- Directed by: Kostadin Bonev
- Written by: Kostadin Bonev, Ina Vultchanova
- Produced by: Vladimir Andreev, Georgi Balkanski
- Starring: Deyan Donkov; Snezhina Petrova; Svetla Yancheva; Stefan Valdobrev
- Cinematography: Konstantin Zankov
- Edited by: Toma Waszarow
- Production company: Borough Film
- Distributed by: А+ Филмс
- Release dates: 29 August 2014 (Apolonia); 3 April 2015
- Running time: 101 minutes
- Country: Bulgaria
- Language: Bulgarian

The Sinking of Sozopol is a 2014 Bulgarian drama film directed by Kostadin Bonev starring Deyan Donkov, Snezhina Petrova, Svetla Yancheva and Stefan Valdobrev. A pre-premiere screening took place at the festival Apolonia in Sozopol on 29 August 2014. Additional screenings took place on 12 October 2014 during the 32nd Golden Rose Film Festival in Varna, and 13 November 2014 at the 28th Bulgarian film festival Cinemania. The film was officially released on 3 April 2015.

== Plot ==
Aging architect Chavo (Deyan Donkov) arrives to Sozopol which is connected to the earlier part of his life.

He is determined to drink 10 bottles of vodka and to commit suicide. He meets his friends, thinks about his past and little by little the rain in Sozopol becomes stronger and stronger responding to his feelings.

Chavo shares his plans to commit suicide with his friend Doc (Stefan Valdobrev) who prescribes him anti-depressants.

The film reflects his complicated relationship with his oppressive artist father and the tragic destiny of his younger brother who ends up drowning.

Tension heightens in the film. The turmoil of nature reflects the loneliness of the architect and his feelings of guilt.

He thinks of his lost love Neva (Snezhina Petrova) and somehow expects a miracle after he drinks the tenth bottle of vodka. Because of her he left his wife Tanya and his children.

The structure of the film is non-linear, the past present and future are inter-connected and create a special atmosphere of ambiguity. The end of the film is unexpected and we find out that the friend Gina committed suicide by jumping into the sea.

== Cast ==
- Deyan Donkov as Chavo
- Snezhina Petrova as Neva
- Svetla Yancheva as Gina
- Stefan Valdobrev as Doc
- Vassil Gurov as Ginji
- Veselin Mezekliev as Father
- Leonid Yovchev as Plamka
- Petya Silyanova as Mother
- Bilyana Kazakova as Nel
- Miroslava Gogovska as Tanichka
- André Chandelle as The Canadian
- Joreta Nikolova as Denata
- Maria Simeonova as Gill

== Production ==
The film was based on the novel of the same name by Ina Vultchanova published in 2007. It was shot over five weeks in September and October 2013 in Sozopol, Ahtopol and Sinemorets.

=== Accolades ===
In October 2014, The Sinking of Sozopol received two awards at the 32nd Golden Rose Bulgarian Feature Film Festival in Varna; Best Actress award (Snejina Petrova) and Best Screenplay award (Ina Valchanova and Kostadin Bonev).

In May 2015 the film was nominated at the New York City International Film Festival in seven categories and won the award for the Best Foreign Film.

In July 2015 the film won an award Best Ensemble Cast at the Milano International Film Festival Awards.

In June 2015 the film won awards from the Bulgarian Film Academy in four categories.

In August 2016 the film won three awards at the Prague Independent Film Festival including the Grand Prix — Golden Eagle, Best Director for Kostadin Bonev and Best Cinematography for Konstantin Zankov.

In September 2016 at the International Film Festival in Brasov the movie won the 'best film award'.
