= The Wall of Mexico =

2019 film directed by Zachary Cotler and Magdalena Zyzak

- Film poster
- Directed by: Zachary Cotler; Magdalena Zyzak
- Written by: Zachary Cotler
- Produced by: Adrian Durazo; Marla Arreola; Sarahi Castro
- Starring: Jackson Rathbone; Esai Morales; Marisol Sacramento; Carmela Zumbado
- Cinematography: Lyn Moncrief
- Edited by: Gabriel Foster Prior
- Music by: Zachary Cotler
- Production companies: The Winter Film Company; Spécola
- Distributed by: Dark Star Pictures
- Release dates: March 8, 2019 (SXSW); October 9, 2020 (United States)
- Running time: 110 minutes
- Country: United States
- Language: English

The Wall of Mexico is a comedy-drama film directed by Zachary Cotler and Magdalena Zyzak. The film, starring Jackson Rathbone, Esai Morales, Marisol Sacramento and Carmela Zumbado, revolves around a wealthy family who build a wall around their water supply in an attempt to prevent theft of their water by local townspeople.

The film premiered at the SXSW Film Festival in 2019, went on to play at other US and international festivals, was released in 2020, and received generally positive reviews from critics.

== Plot ==
The wealthy Mexican-American Arista family hires a new white handyman, Don (Jackson Rathbone). Don, mentored by veteran groundskeeper Mike (Xander Berkeley), labors at the ranch for months and comes to learn that something unusual is going on there, something having to do with the Arista's well; the water level keeps going down even when it rains. Meanwhile, Don has become enamored with the daughters of the family, Ximena (Carmela Zumbado) and Tania (Marisol Sacramento), especially Tania.

One night, Don and the patriarch Henry (Esai Morales) chase a group of thieves away from the well. Don becomes aware there may be something unusual about the water itself. Henry orders Mike and Don to hire a crew and build a giant wall around the ranch to thwart future thieves. This action leads to an altercation between the nearby mostly white town and the Mexican-American family. It also leads Don to insatiable curiosity about the well and to actions with major consequences.

== Cast ==
- Jackson Rathbone as Donovan Taylor
- Esai Morales as Henry Arista
- Marisol Sacramento as Tania Arista
- Carmela Zumbado as Ximena Arista
- Alex Meneses as Monica Arista
- Moisés Arias as Cokestraw
- Mariel Hemingway as Mayor Ann Mason
- Xander Berkeley as Michael Rand
- Blake Lindsley as Sergeant Polk

== Release ==
The Wall of Mexico is a 2020 theatrical and VOD release by Dark Star Pictures.

The film premiered at the South by Southwest Film Festival on March 8, 2019 and screened at various other festivals that year, including the Nashville Film Festival, the Newport Beach Film Festival, the Haifa International Film Festival, and the American Film Festival.

== Reception ==
=== Critical reception ===
On review aggregator website Rotten Tomatoes, the film holds an approval rating of 64% based on 11 critic reviews.

Review website and magazine The Hollywood Reporter praised the performances of the actors in the film, particularly those of Morales, Rathborne, Berkeley, Hemingway, Sacramento and Zumbado.

American newspaper The Austin Chronicle reviewed the film positively, stating "Although the film’s allegorical references are easy to suss out, it is nice to see our current border wall mess addressed from the other side of the divider. Drug-fueled scenes are filmed via subjective techniques worthy of a contact high."

Critic Danielle Solzman praised the film's political complexity, stating "The Wall of Mexico is quite the allegorical response to the Trump administration. It’s even more ironic when one realizes that this American-made film was filmed south of the border. That’s a win for the Mexican economy nonetheless. Honestly, I can’t stop laughing at this part."

=== Awards and nominations ===
In 2019, at the American Film Festival, the film was nominated for the Narrative Feature award.
