= Ina Vultchanova =

Ina Vultchanova is a Bulgarian journalist, writer, radio producer and translator. She studied philology at Sofia University St. Kliment Ohridski. She worked for many years producing radio plays for Bulgarian National Radio, winning several prizes for her work. She is also a member of the Union of Bulgarian Filmmakers. Collaborating with Kostadin Bonev, she reworked her first novel into a script which became the movie Sinking of Sozopol. Her 2016 book Остров Крах (The Crack-Up Island) won the EU Prize for Literature.
