= After the Rehearsal =

1984 Swedish television film

- Written by: Ingmar Bergman
- Directed by: Ingmar Bergman
- Starring: Erland Josephson; Ingrid Thulin; Lena Olin; Nadja Palmstjerna-Weiss; Bertil Guve
- Country of origin: Sweden
- Original language: Swedish

Production
- Producer: Jörn Donner
- Cinematography: Sven Nykvist
- Running time: 70 min

Original release
- Release: 9 April 1984

After the Rehearsal (Swedish: Efter repetitionen) is a television film, written and directed by Ingmar Bergman in 1984. The script contains numerous quotes from Strindberg's A Dream Play. The film was screened out of competition at the 1984 Cannes Film Festival.

== Plot summary ==
Rational, exacting, and self-controlled theater director, Henrik Vogler, often stays after rehearsal to think and plan. On this day, Anna comes back, ostensibly looking for a bracelet. She is the lead in his new production of Strindberg's A Dream Play. She talks of her hatred for her mother (now dead), an alcoholic actress who was Vogler's star and lover. Vogler falls into a reverie, remembering a day Anna's mother, Rakel, late in life, came after rehearsal to beg him to come to her apartment. He awakes and Anna reveals the reason she has returned: she jolts him into an emotional response, rare for him, and the feelings of a young woman and an older man play out.

== Cast ==
- Erland Josephson – Henrik Vogler (older)
- Ingrid Thulin – Rakel Egerman
- Lena Olin – Anna Egerman (older)
- Nadja Palmstjerna-Weiss – Anna Egerman (younger)
- Bertil Guve – Henrik Vogler (younger)

(Tartan DVD release of this film erroneously lists "Liv Ullmann" as one of the three main stars. Ullmann is not in this film)

== Reception ==
After the Rehearsal received strongly positive reviews from critics, garnering a 91% approval rating on Rotten Tomatoes. Vincent Canby wrote that it "may well be another Bergman classic." Roger Ebert gave it a full four stars and argued that the work "consists of unadorned surfaces concealing fathomless depths." The film ranked 4th on Cahiers du Cinéma's Top 10 Films of the Year List in 1985.
