= Carmela Zumbado =

Cuban American actress (b. 1991)

- Born: February 27, 1991 (age 35)
- Occupation: Actress
- Years active: 2012–present
- Relatives: Gigi Zumbado (sister); Marisela Zumbado (sister)

Carmela Zumbado (born February 27, 1991) is an American actress. Her breakthrough role was as Delilah Alves in the Netflix thriller series You (2019). She subsequently earned praise for playing Ximena Arista in the drama film The Wall of Mexico (2019), and has additionally played Jeny B in the action film Need for Speed (2014) and Denise Martinez on the musical series Crazy Ex-Girlfriend (2019). She appeared on season nine of Chicago P.D. in a recurring role. In 2023, She joined Power Book IV: Force (2023–2026) as a series regular

== Early life ==
Zumbado is a second-generation Cuban-American and was born and raised in Miami, Florida. She is the daughter of Emmy Award-winning photojournalist Tony Zumbado and Lilliam Zumbado. She is also the oldest of three siblings and has younger sisters named Gigi and Marisela, who are also actresses.

== Career ==
Zumbado began acting in 2012, making her debut with two appearances on the television crime series America’s Most Wanted, appearing first as Karen Martinez, then as Teresa Martinez. In the same year, she appeared in the television film Freestyle Love Supreme as Rachel, a film which was later adapted onto Broadway. Zumbado continued to make appearances on shows such as Necessary Roughness and Graceland in 2013, and in the same year made a cameo appearance in the film Identity Thief, as a salesperson at a salon.

In 2014, she made her film debut as Jeny B in the action-thriller film Need for Speed. The film was a commercial success and critical failure. She made appearances on various television shows that same year, including a cameo appearance in the Netflix series Bloodline. Zumbado had a recurring role as Windi Stewart in the crime series NCIS: New Orleans and appeared as Susan in the crime series NCIS: Los Angeles. In 2016, she had a guest role as Denise Martinez on the comedic television series Crazy Ex-Girlfriend, which she later reprised in 2019.

In 2019, she starred as Ximena Arista in the drama film The Wall of Mexico, which was favorably received. In the same year, it was announced that she was cast in the role of Delilah Alves in the second season of the Netflix thriller series You. Zumbado had a guest role as Paloma Ball on the final season of the television series The Magicians, and played Gwen, the ex-wife of character Freddie Benson on the sitcom reboot iCarly. In 2023, she appeared as part of the main cast in season two of Power Book IV: Force as Mireya Garcia.

== Filmography ==
=== Film ===
Year	Title	Role	Notes
2013	Identity Thief	Salon Salesperson	Cameo
2014	Need For Speed	Jeny B	Supporting role
2015	Our Brand Is Crisis	Reporter	Cameo
2019	The Wall of Mexico	Ximena Arista	Main role
2020	Run Sweetheart Run	Dawn	Supporting role
2020	2 Minutes of Fame	Reporter	Supporting role
2020	White Elephant	Joey	Supporting role
2024	Carnivora	Maribel	Short
2024	If I Tell You	Luisa	

=== Television ===
Year	Title	Role	Notes
2012	America's Most Wanted	Karen/Teresa Martinez	Recurring role; 2 episodes
2012	Freestyle Love Supreme	Rachel	Television film
2013	Necessary Roughness	Woman	Cameo
2013	Graceland	Julie	
2015	Every Witch Way	Witch	Cameo
2015	Bloodline	Girl	Cameo
2015	NCIS: New Orleans	Windi Stewart	Recurring role; 2 episodes
2015	Scream	Riley Decoy	
2016, 2019	Crazy Ex-Girlfriend	Denise Martinez	Recurring role; 2 episodes
2017	NCIS: Los Angeles	Susan	
2017	Rosewood	Thanny Torres	
2019	You	Delilah Alves	Main role (season 2)
2020	The Magicians	Paloma Ball	Episode: "The Balls"
2021, 2023	iCarly	Gwen	Guest Star (2 episodes)
2021	The Rookie	'Freegan' Frida	Guest Star (S03E05)
2021–2022	Chicago P.D.	Anna Avalos	Recurring role (season 9)
2023–2026	Power Book IV: Force	Mireya Garcia	Main role (seasons 2–3)
2024	Doctor Odyssey	Luna	Guest Star
2026	Law & Order: Special Victims Unit	Eliana Castillo	Episode: "Deep Under"
