= Prague Independent Film Festival =

International film festival in Czech Republic for independent cinema

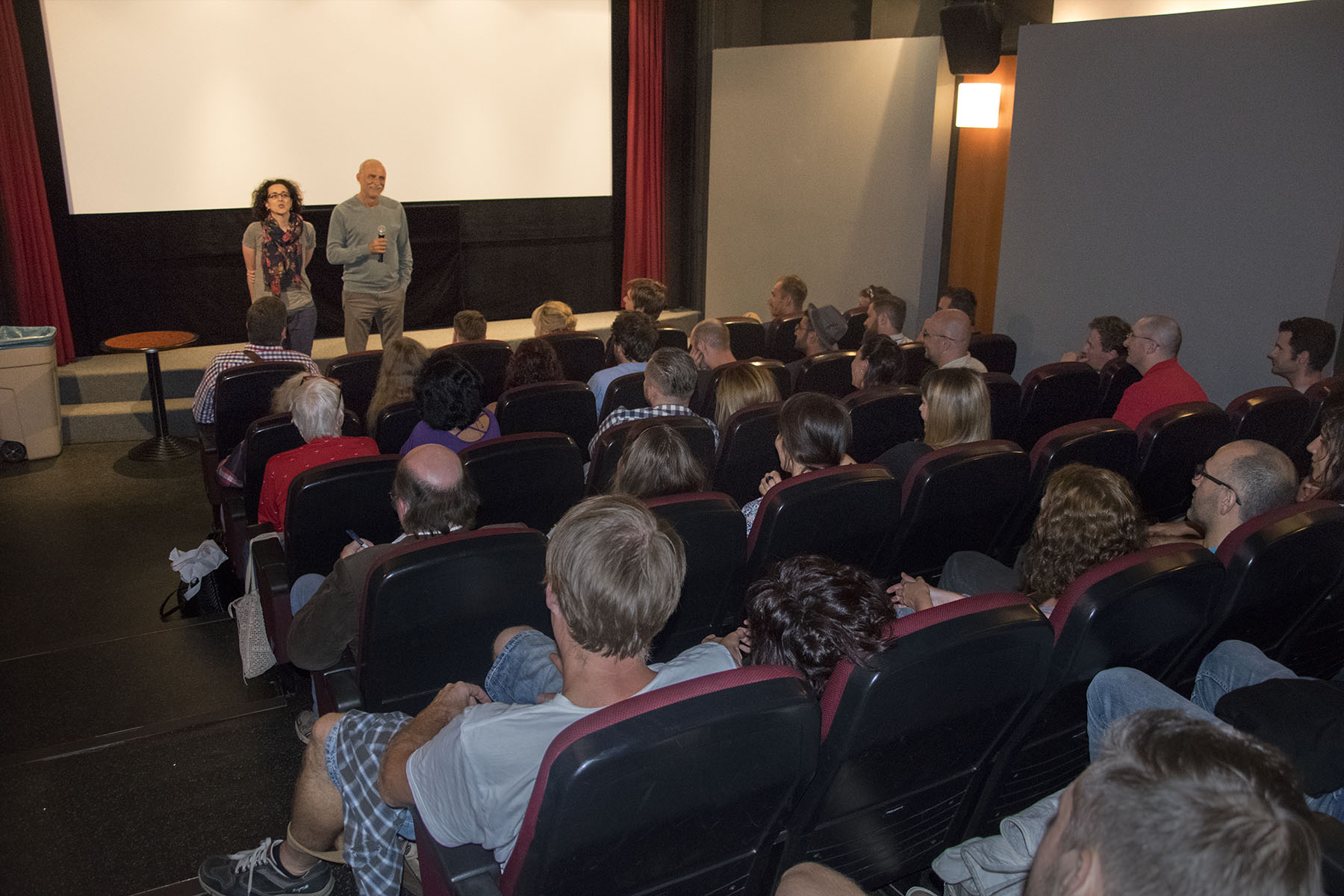
- Location: Prague, Czech Republic
- Website: prague-film-festival.com

Prague Independent Film Festival (PIFF) (Czech: Pražský festival nezávislých filmů) is an international film festival held annually in August in Prague, the capital of Czech Republic. The festival focuses on independent cinema. Festival founder and director is Diana Ringo.

== History ==
=== 2016 ===
Prague Independent Film Festival was held for the first time on 15–18 August 2016 in the cinemas Kino Evald, Kino Atlas and Kino Lucerna. The festival program consisted of 33 films. Opening film of the festival was Rocco has Your Name by Angelo Orlando. Angelo Orlando won the Best Screenplay award and the leading actor Michele Venitucci received the Best Actor award.

Grand Prix of the festival – The Golden Eagle – was awarded to the Bulgarian drama film Sinking of Sozopol by Kostadin Bonev.

Shamim Sarif received the Best Feature Film award for her espionage drama Despite the Falling Snow based on the best selling eponymous novel written by herself. Rebecca Ferguson was awarded Best Actress and Anthony Head received the Best Supporting Actor award.

Best Animated Film was awarded to The Snow Queen 2 from the Russian animation company Wizart Animation. The film was written and directed by Aleksey Tsitsilin and produced by Timur Bekmambetov.

Best Short Film was awarded to the short film Cora made by Kevin Maxwell, a student of Santa Monica College who was supervised by Salvador Carrasco.

=== 2017 ===
The opening film of the festival was Collector by Alexei Krasovsky. Alexei Krasovsky received the Best Director, Gustav Meyrink Prize and Konstantin Khabensky received the Best Actor award.

The film Maya Dardel, written and directed by Magdalena Zyzak and Zachary Cotler received the Best Screenplay award and Lena Olin received the Best Actress award.

Train Driver's Diary directed by Milos Radovic received the Grand Prix, Best Feature Film and Lazar Ristovski received the Best Actor prize.

== Gallery ==
Ed Stoppard at the 2026 Prague Independent Film Festival

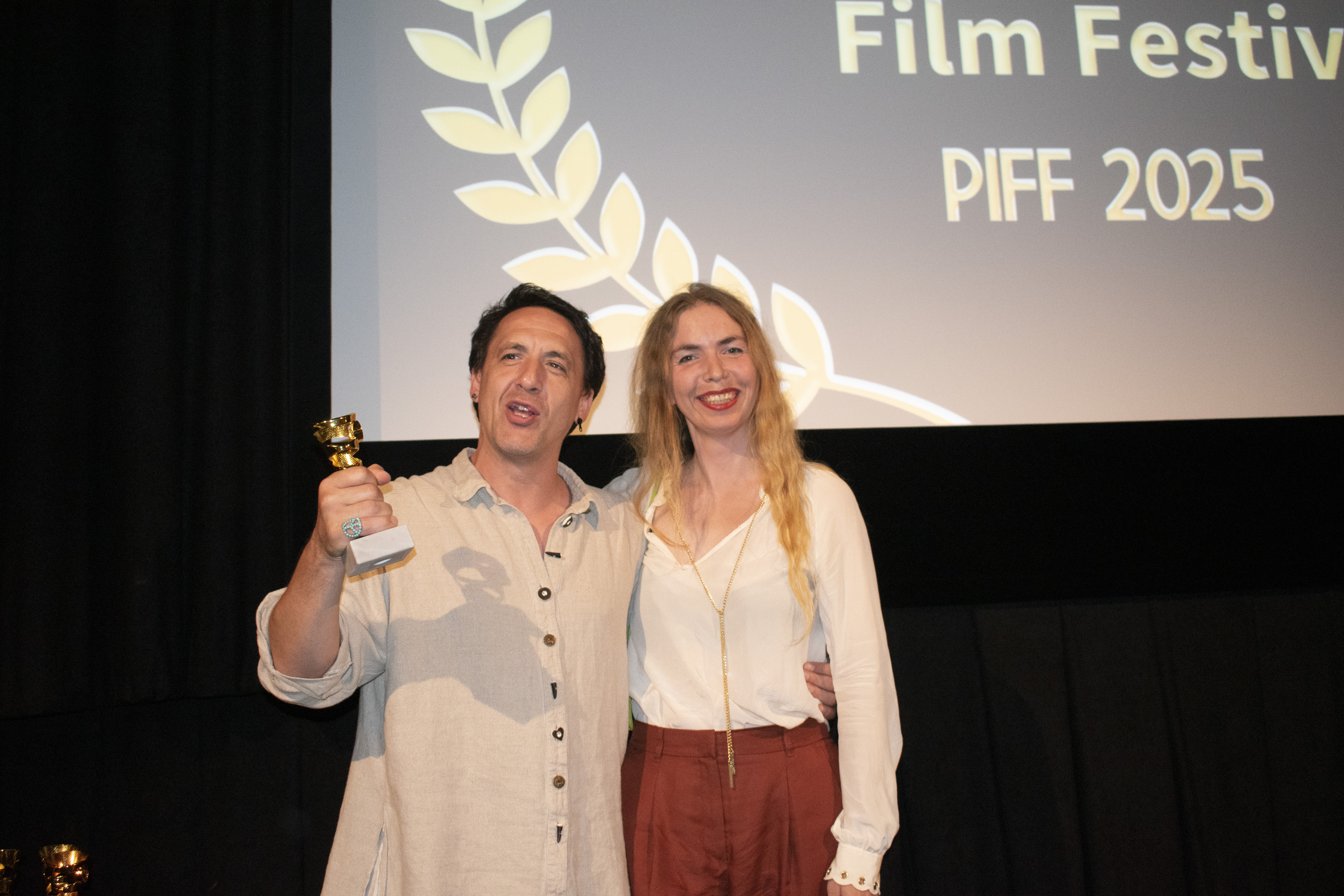
Artur Smolyaninov receiving the Best Actor award in 2025

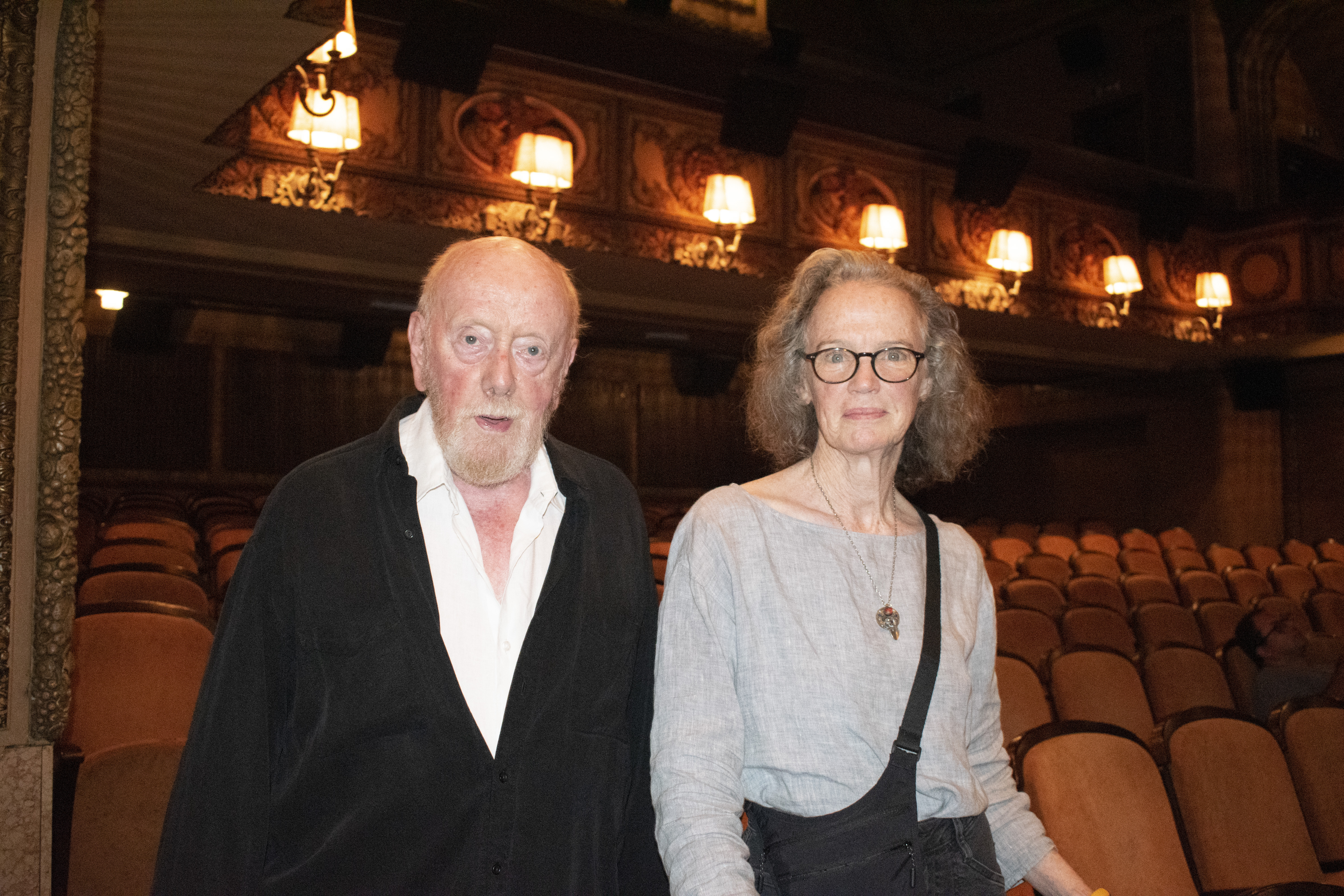
Peter Maloney and Kristin Griffith attending in 2025

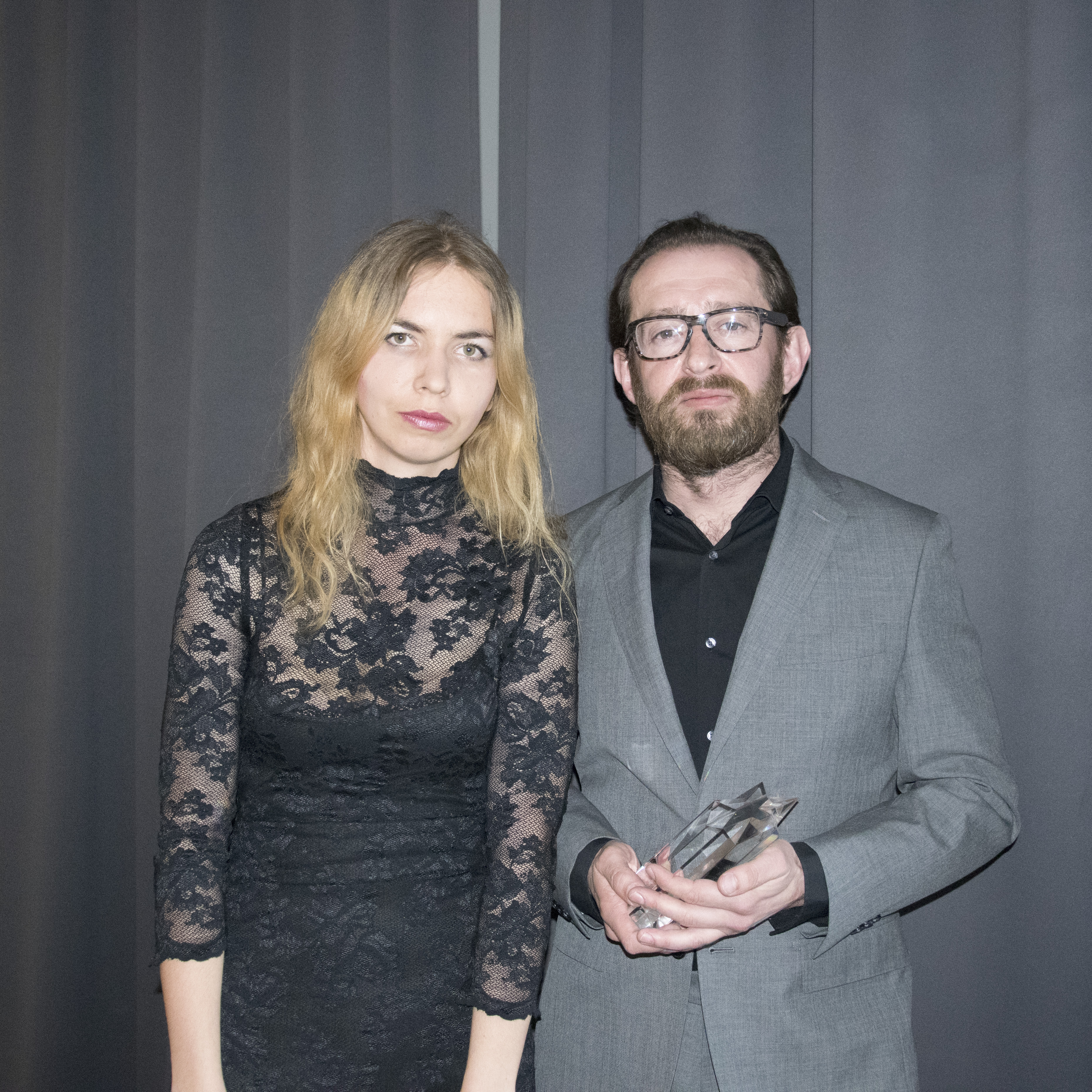
Actor and director Konstantin Khabensky receiving his honorary award from the festival director

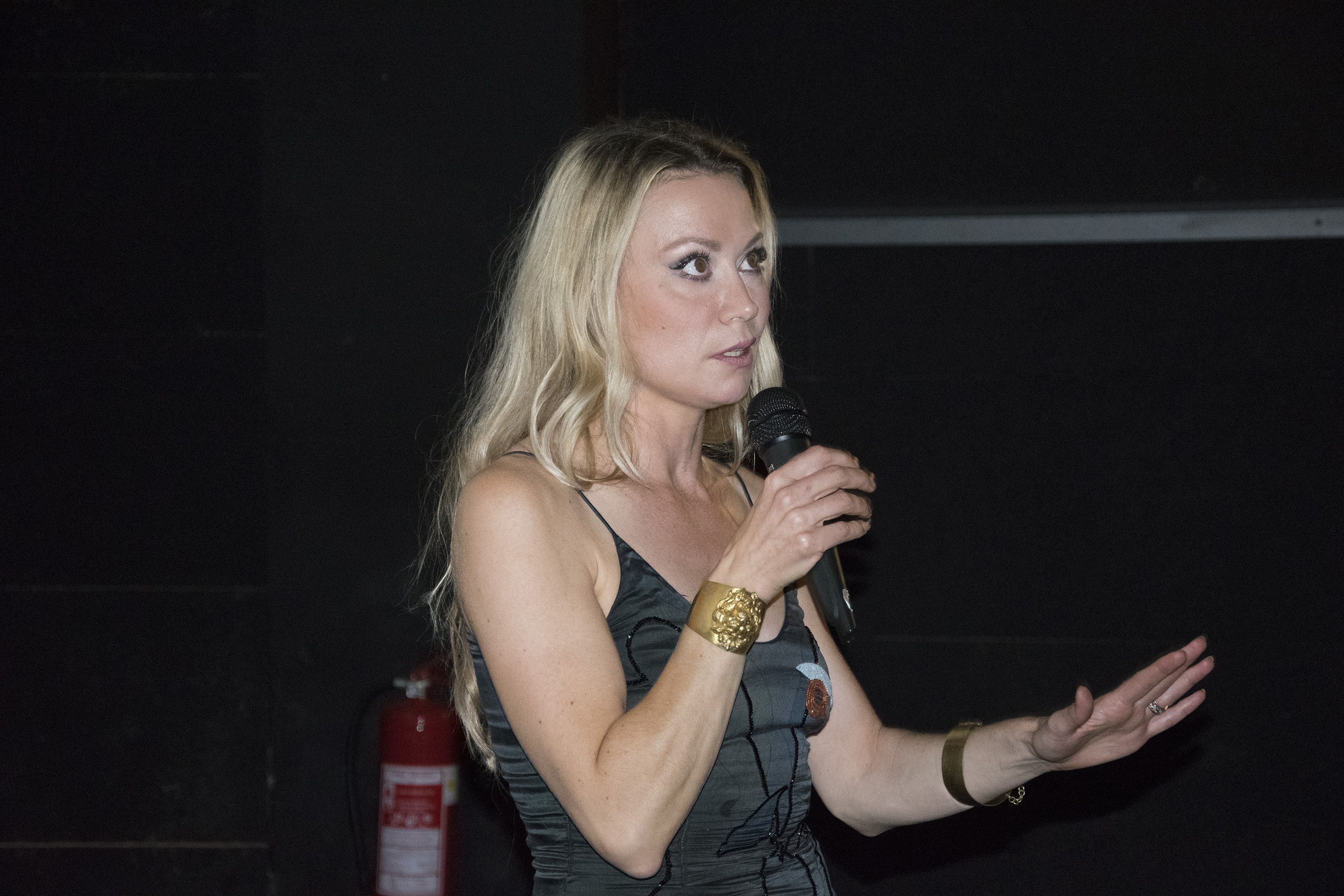
Director Anna Eriksson presenting the film M

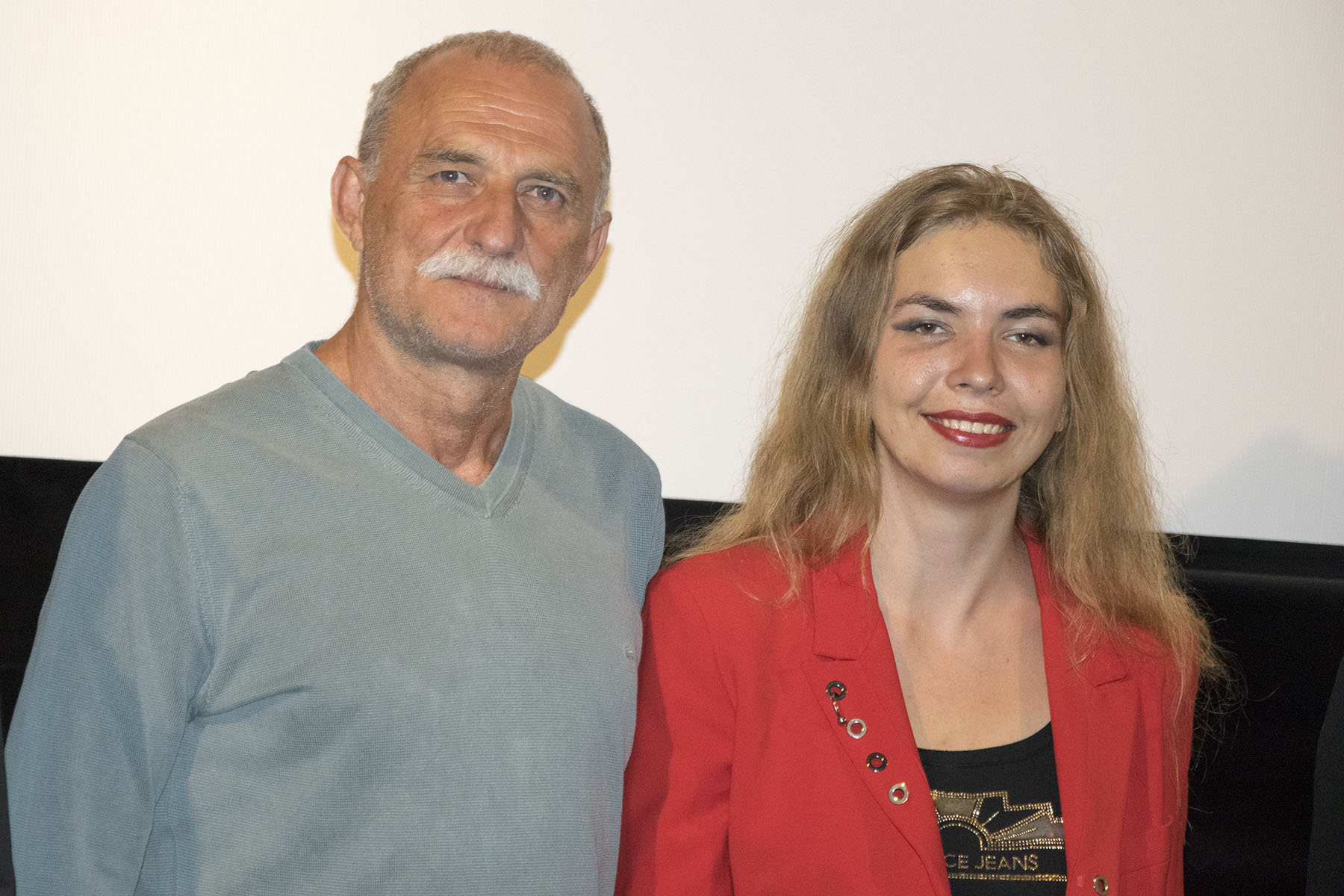
Actor and producer Lazar Ristovski at the presentation of Train Driver's Diary

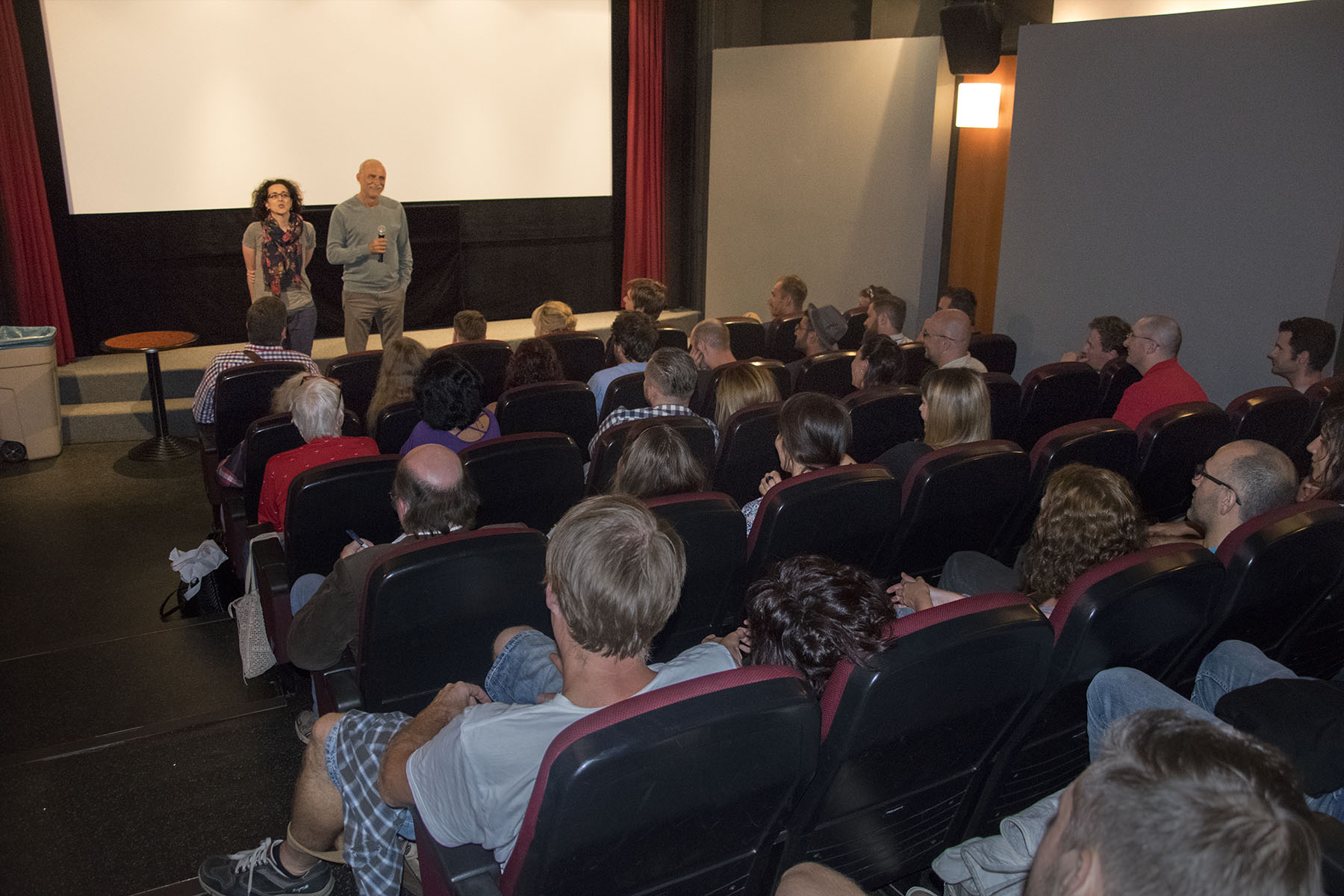
Lazar Ristovski presenting the film Train Driver's Diary

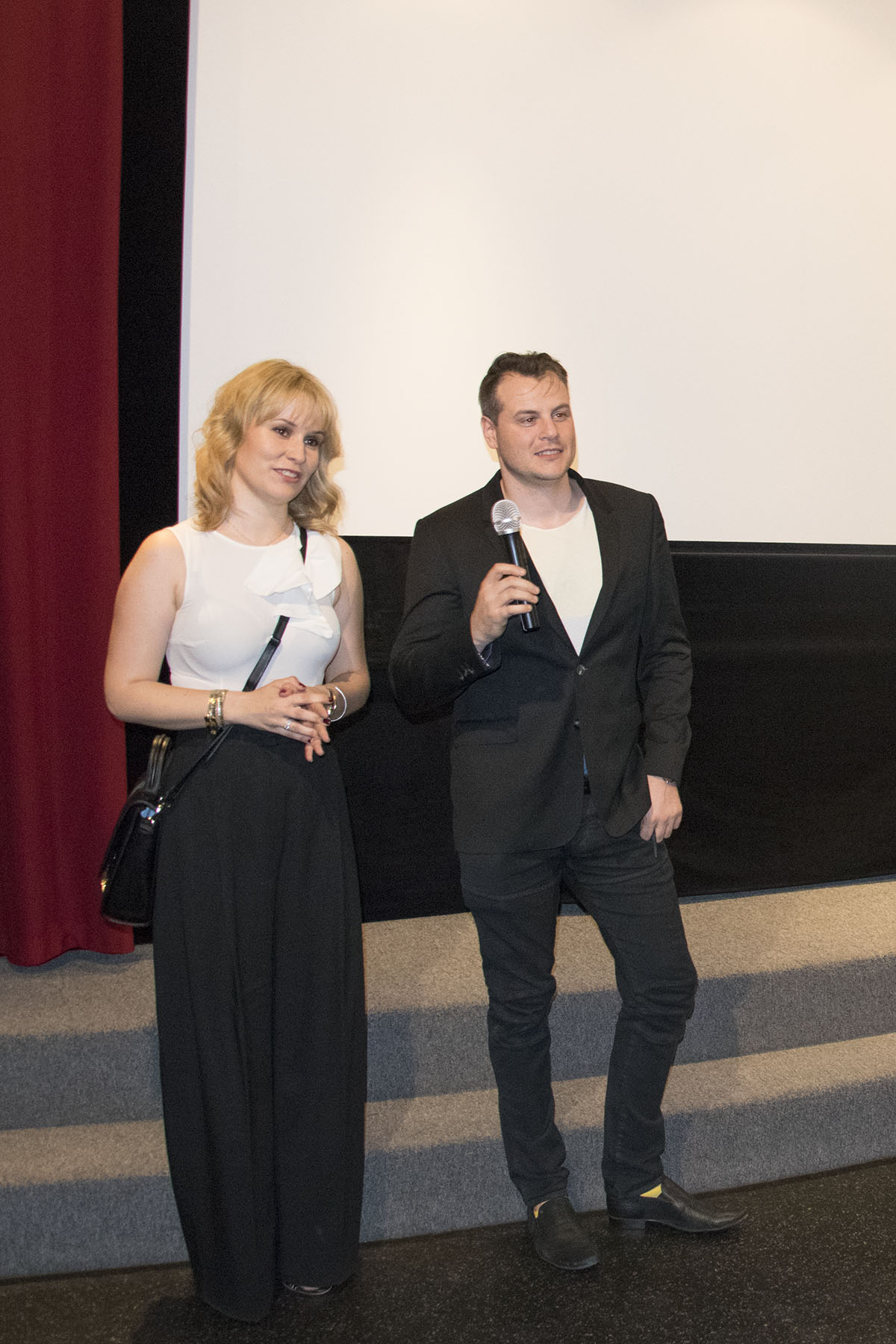
Directors Magdalena Zyzak and Zachary Cotler presenting the film Maya Dardel

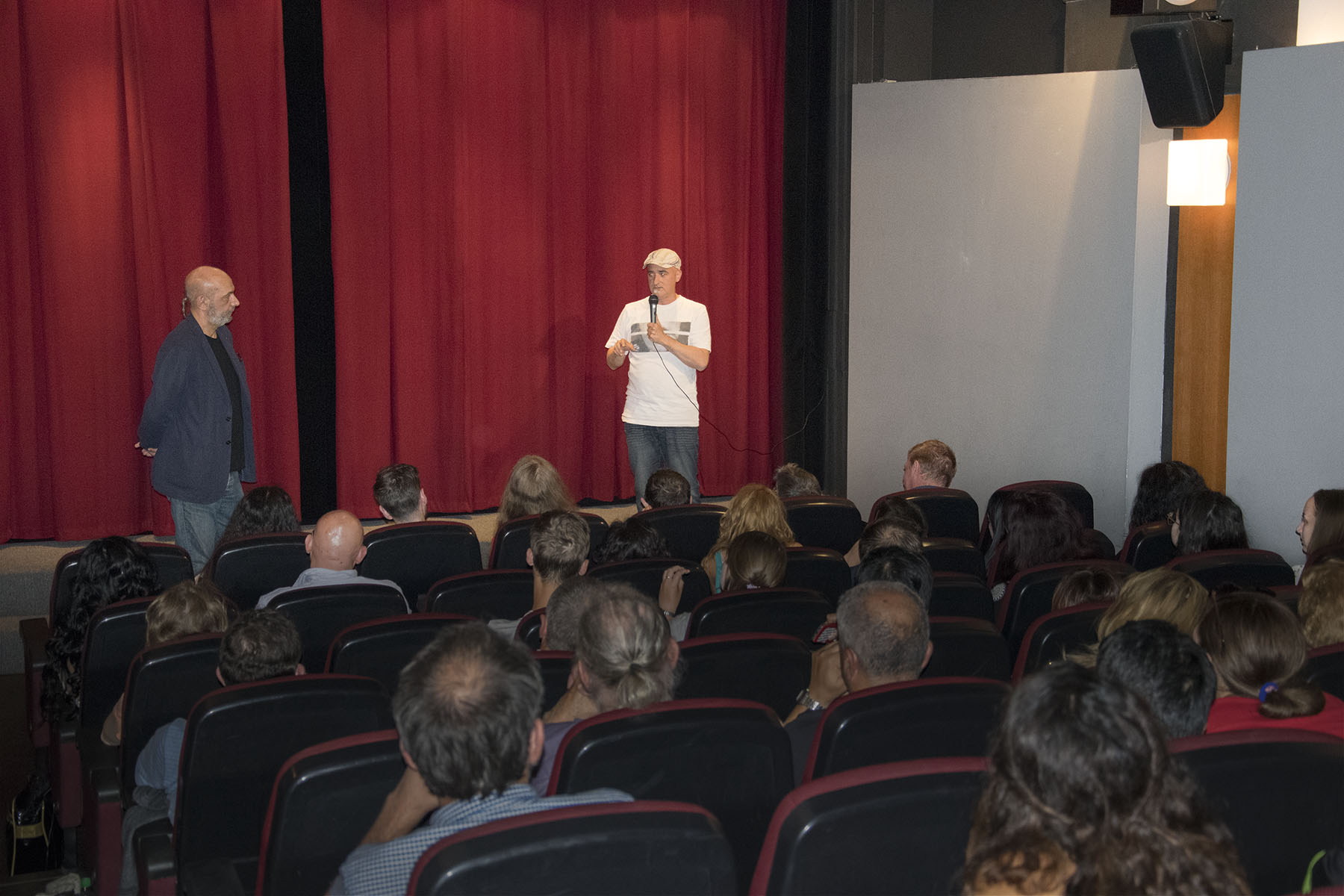
Director Angelo Orlando and musician Saro Cosentino presenting the film Rocco Has Your Name

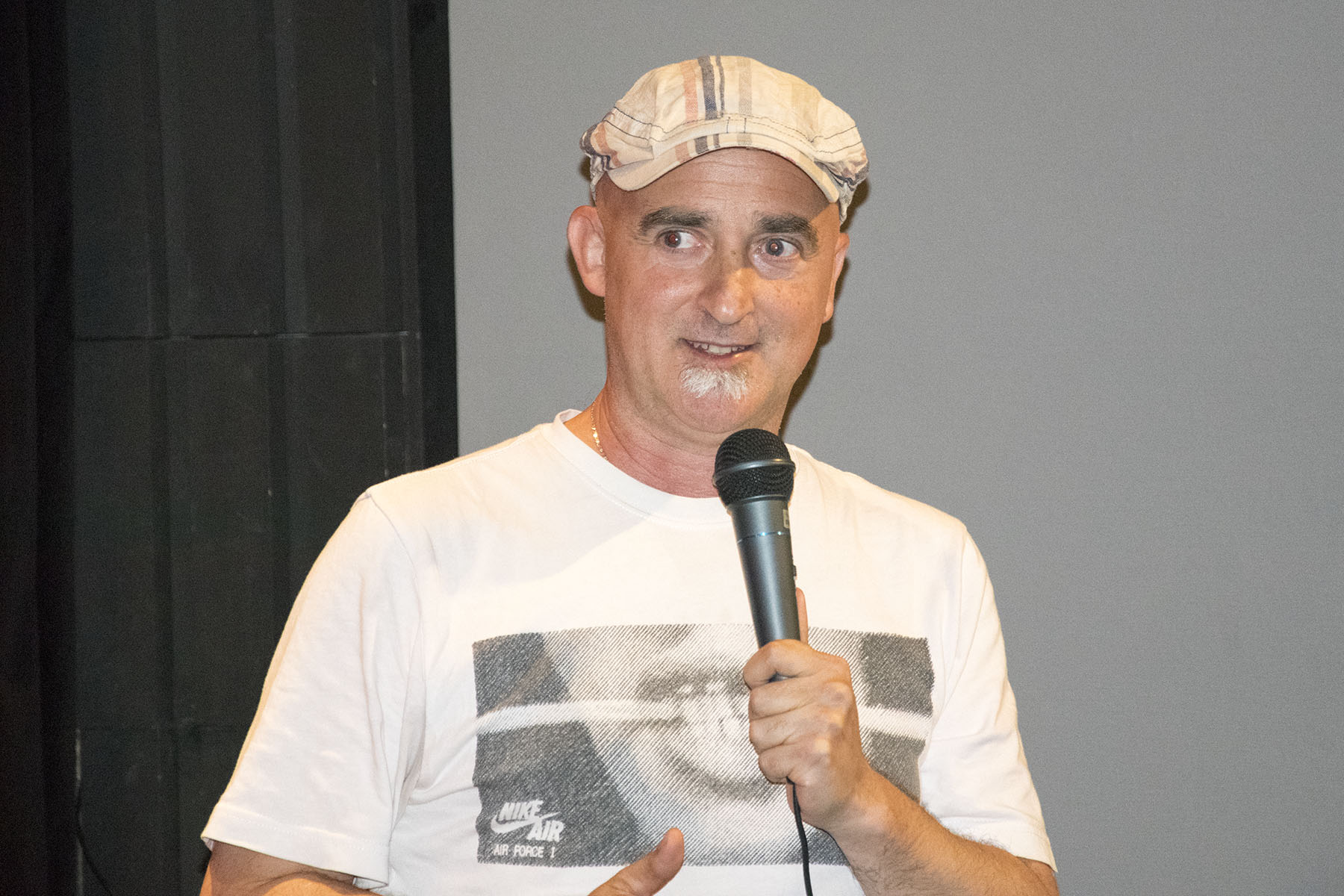
Angelo Orlando presenting the film Rocco Has Your Name

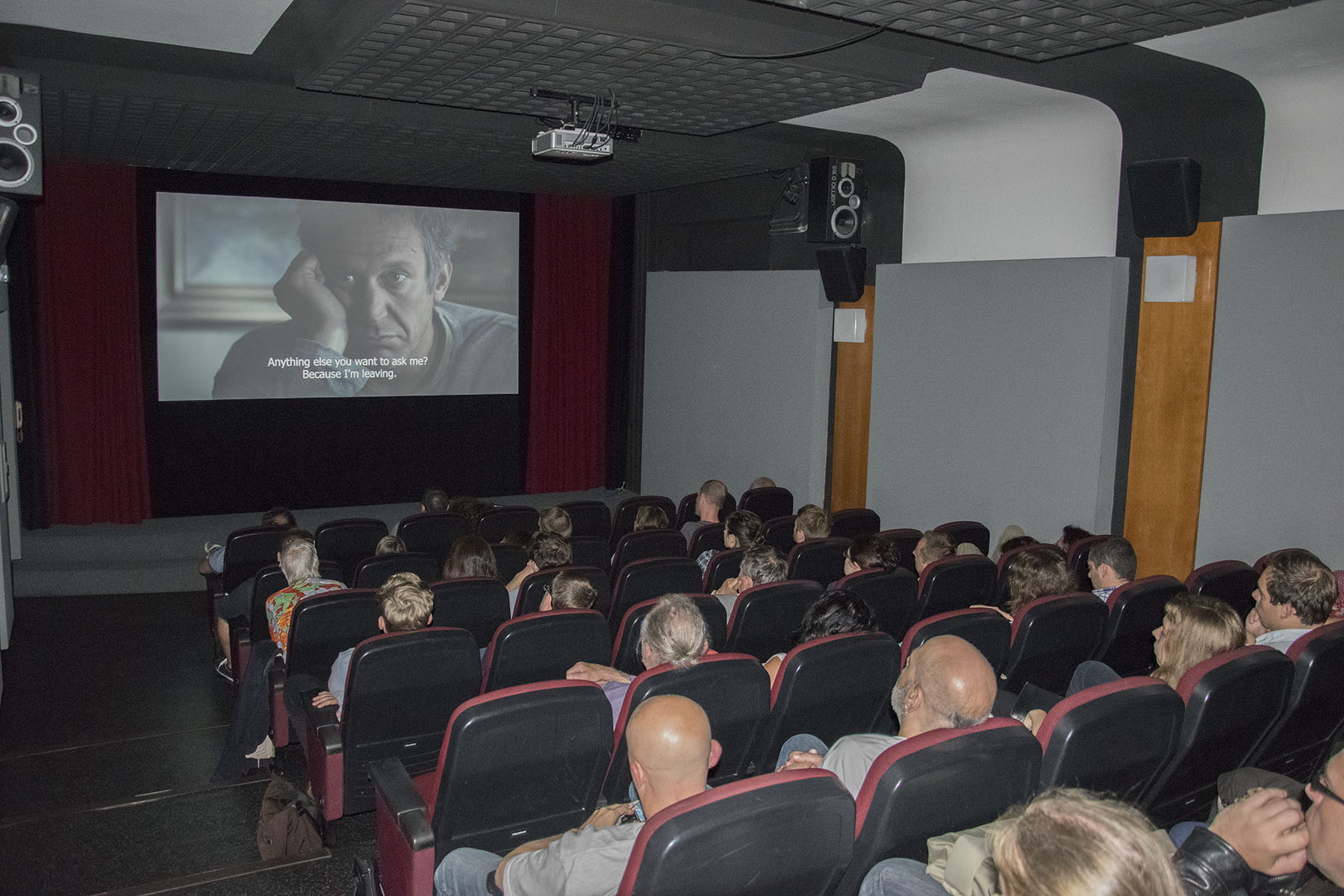
Sinking of Sozopol screening

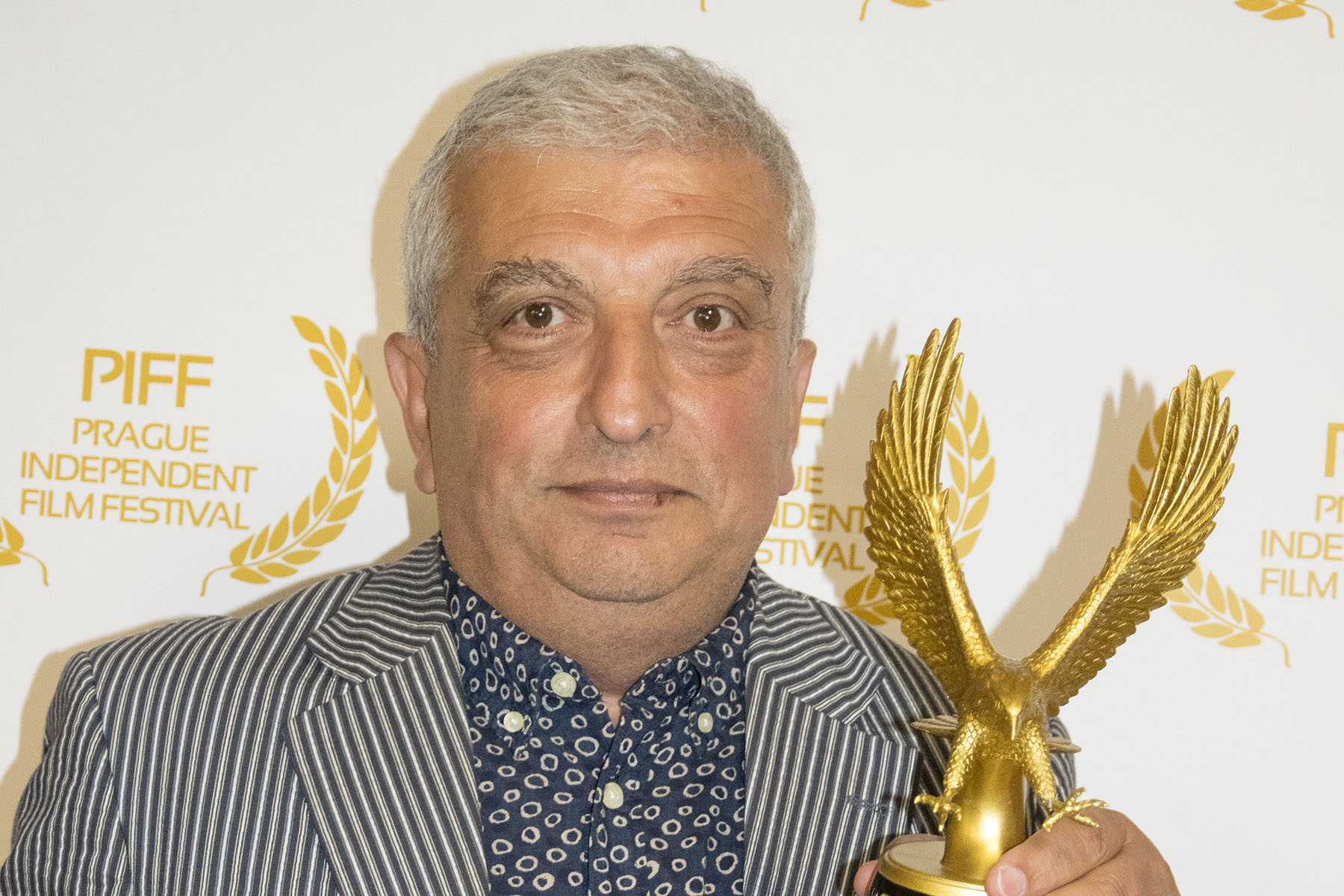
Kostadin Bonev with the Grand Prix

== Winners ==
=== 2026 ===
Best Feature Film

- The Watchmaker — Jonas Lawes

Best Short Film

- The Ghost Writer — Todd I. Gordon

Best Director

- Ed Stoppard — The Confession

Best Actor

- Mark Bonnar — The Confession

Best Screenplay

- Alice_FSB — Adam Marchand

Best Editing

- At What Cost? — Elena Walsh O’Brien

Best Cinematography

- Katerina Borovic — Ninna Palma

Best Art Direction

- Monile — Marcello Bedoni

Best Music Video

- Siddharta – In the Sky — Ven Jemersic

Best Documentary

- Hans & Kjell — Silje Reistad

Best Animated Film

- Thiefish — Evelyn Dale, Madhava Kinnicutt

Best Comedy Film

- The Current State of the Backyard Pool Industry — Derek Frey

Best Experimental Film

- Symbol of the Solar Soul — Zhao He

Best Unproduced Script

- The Last Street — Kevin Ryan

=== 2025 ===
Best Feature Film

- I Never Said Goodbye — Yev K'banchik

Best Actor

- Artur Smolyaninov — I Never Said Goodbye

Best Actress

- Kristin Griffith — The Reckoning

Best Director

- The Reckoning — Alex Breux

Best Short Film

- Night of Resolutions — Dylan Gouze

Best Short Film Director

- Russell De Rozario — This Damnation

Best Documentary

- Kazbegi — Yakiv Antypenko

Best Unproduced Screenplay

- Come Monday — Graham Streeter

Best Cinematography

- The Split — Lindsay Kent, Lauren Kent

Best Art Direction

- The Mimefia — Julia Pitch

Best Experimental Film

- Providence: Electric Gods II — Joshua Benson

Best Music Video

- Baby — Nora Rosenthal

Best Animated Film

- Tiny Teaching Tales — Julie Anne Burch

=== 2024 ===
Best Feature Film

- Stampila — David Larson

Best Director - Feature Film

- Giant's Kettle — Markku Hakala, Mari Käki

Best Director - Short Film

- Lobster Trial — Catherine Dyer

Best Actor

- Clark Freeman — All That Remains

Best Short Film

- Arachne — Tommy Creagh

Best Art Direction

- Love Intense — Raja Hanna

Best Screenplay

- Zeke — Darrell Bridgers

Best Editing

- David Valdez — This is Not My Beautiful House (directed by Mark Tompkins)

Best Debut

- The Only Way Out is Through — Nicole Catania

Best Animated Film

- I'm Hip — John Musker

Jury Award - Gustav Meyrink Prize

- John Musker — I'm Hip

Best Experimental Film

- Giant's Kettle — Markku Hakala, Mari Käki

Best Cinematography

- Villa Mink — Darron Carswell

Best Documentary

- Erik's Midwestern Boyhood - Erik Jakobsen

Best Music Video

- Won't Be Around — Terry Blade

Best Unproduced Script

- THE PRODIGAL — Thomas O'Malley

=== 2023 ===
Best Feature Film

- Unfix — Directed by Graham Streeter

Best Director

- Anna Eriksson — W

Best Actress

- Anna Eriksson — W

Best Film Score

- You Are The Story — Music by Saro Cosentino & Tim Bowness

Best Short Film

- The Intermission — Directed by Ben von Grafenstein

Best Short Film Director

- Yusuke Ishide — The Master of Sento

Best Cinematography

- Cactus — Directed by Dimitris Zouras

Best Art Direction

- Anna Eriksson — W

Best Animated Film

- A Boat in the Rain — directed by Yoana Atanasova

Best Screenplay

- A Rush of Peace — written by M Hayward Scott & directed by Jake Lockett

Best Documentary Film

- Egypt — Directed by Erik Jakobsen

Best Experimental Film

- Achilles — Directed by Adam Morris

Best Music Video

- Kogersin — Directed by Malik Zenger

Best Unproduced Script

- The Dream of America — Written by Bo Svenson

Honorary Mentions

- Damon Mckinnis — Unfix
- Natalie Brown — Slut Chain
- Margaux Tiltman — Oh Claire!
- Christopher Willis — The Book of Disquiet

=== 2022 ===
Grand Prix

- The Road to Galena — Directed by Joe Hall

Best Director

- Joe Hall — The Road to Galena

Best Feature Film

- Troubled Minds — Directed by Raitis Abele & Lauris Abele

Best Short Film

- The Turn of the Screw — Directed by Chris Fretwell

Best Actor

- Luke Mably - The Ghost Writer

Best Cinematography

- Sally Leapt Out Of A Window Last Night — Directed by Tracy Spottiswoode

Best Art Direction

- The Ghost Writer — Art direction by Belle Mundi

Best Screenplay

- Troubled Minds — Raitis Abele & Lauris Abele

Best Documentary

- Mike Mignola: Drawing Monsters — Directed by Kevin Konrad Hanna & Jim Demonakos

Best Musical

- A Minute To Midnight: A Musical — Directed by Caue Barcelos & Patrick Flanagan

Best Experimental Film

- CANAL — Will Rahilly

Best Animated Film

- Kuwonererwa — Ronald Kabicek

Best Music Video

- Got to move — Oltscho

Best Unproduced Script

- Mad Bad Dangerous to Know — Written by Leonora Pitts & Emily Robinson

Honorary Mention (Student Film)

- Righteous — Directed by Ethan Grossman

=== 2021 ===
Grand Prix

- The Final Stand — Directed by Vadim Shmelyov

Best Director

- The Final Stand — Directed by Vadim Shmelyov

Best Feature

- The Stairs — Directed by Peter "Drago" Tiemann

Best Cinematography

- Sashka. A Soldier's Diary (ru) — Directed by Kirill Zaytsev. Cinematography by Vladimir Klimov

Best Screenplay

- Sashka. A Soldier's Diary — Directed by Kirill Zaytsev. Screenplay by Ivan Klochko & Igor Konyaev.

Best Documentary

- OLEG — Directed by Nadia Tass

Best Documentary ex aequo

- The Great Suppression: How Covid-19 Reignited the Fight for Life & Liberty — Directed by Deborah Wright

Best Actor

- Sergey Bezrukov — The Final Stand

Best Supporting Actor

- John Schneider — The Stairs

Best Music Score

- The Final Stand — Score by Yuri Poteenko

Best Short Film

- The Stench — Directed by Won Jang

Best Short Film Director

- Radda Novikova — Moscow Slide

Best Experimental

- Geneva Jacuzzi's Casket — Directed by Chris Friend

Best Student Film

- Old Cliff Rising — Curtis Roland

Best Art Direction

- The Swamp — Directed by Erkki Perkiömäki

Best Animation

- Feeling Lonely — Directed by Julian Nazario Vargas

Best Music Video

- Mari Kraimbrery by Hiding in the Bathroom — Directed by Serghey Grey

=== 2020 ===
Grand Prix

- Lost Transmissions — Directed by Katharine O'Brien

Best Feature Film

- Man from Beirut — Directed Christoph Gampl
- Best Director
  - Raimundas Banionis — Purple Mist

Best Screenplay

- Purple Mist — Raimundas Banionis

Best Actor

- Simon Pegg — Lost Transmissions

Best Actress

- Juno Temple — Lost Transmissions
- Lucie Vondráčková — Beyond her Lens

Best Short Film

- Unknown Mother — Wai Yin Wong

Best Music Video

- Nice Shoes — Directed by Jonathan Lawrence

Best Student Film

- Out of Touch — Directed by Bobby Murphy

Best Art Direction

- Eerie Fairy Tales — Directed by Meet Sander

Best Documentary

- Living in the Age of Miracles — Directed by Mia Tomikawa

Best Cinematography

- Man from Beirut — Cinematography by Eeva Fleig

Best Animated Film

- Spectre's Bride — Directed by Francesca Borgatta

Best Experimental Film

- Last Film — Directed by Martiros Vartanov

=== 2019 ===
Grand Prix

- M — Directed by Anna Eriksson

Gustav Meyrink Prize (Jury Prize)

- The Snow Queen: Mirrorlands — Directed by Robert Lence, Alexey Tsitsilin

Best Feature Film

- M — Directed by Anna Eriksson

Best Director

- Kostadin Bonev — Away from the Shore

Best Screenplay

- Night Walk — Aziz Tazi

Best Actor

- Mickey Rourke — Night Walk

Best Short Film

- Aji — Anastasia Berezovsky

Best Music Video

- Dark like the night. Karenina-2019 — Directed by Radda Novikova

Best Student Film

- Hinge — Directed by Lisa Ann Mayo

Best Art Direction

- Land of Winter — Directed by Tommy Creagh

Best Documentary

- To tell a Ghost — Directed by Chris Piotrowicz, Stefan Ehrhardt

Best Cinematography

- Away from the Shore — Cinematography by Konstantin Zankov

Best Animated Film

- Burning Bright — Directed by Aaron Bierman

Best Experimental Film

- We are in a Dream — Directed by Henna Välkky, Eesu Lehtola

=== 2018 ===
Grand Prix

- Octav — Directed by Serge Ioan Celebidachi

Honorary Award

- Konstantin Khabensky

Best Feature Film

- Ivanov — Directed by Dimitri Falkovich

Best Director

- Graham Streeter — I May Regret

Best Screenplay

- I May Regret — Graham Streeter

Best Actor

- Marcel Iures — Octav

Best Short Film

- Mr. Goody — Jason MacDonald

Best Music Video

- #INSTAGRAM — Directed by Valeriya Gai Germanika

Best Art Direction

- Dance to the Party — Directed by Wayne Isham

Best Documentary

- Ballad of the Righteous Merchant — Directed by Herbert Golder

Best Cinematography

- Ivanov — Cinematography by Georges Lechaptois

Best Animated Film

- Moon's Milk — Directed by Ri Crawford

Best Experimental Film

- It Grows Dark — Directed by Benjamin Capps

=== 2017 ===
Grand Prix

- Train Driver's Diary — Directed by Milos Radovic

Best Feature Film

- Train Driver’s Diary — Directed by Milos Radovic

Best Director

- Alexei Krasovsky — Collector

Best Screenplay

- Zachary Cotler and Magdalena Zyzak — Maya Dardel

Best Cinematography

- Rana Kamran — Mah e Mir

Best Actor

- Lazar Ristovski — Train Driver’s Diary
- Konstantin Khabensky — Collector

Best Actress

- Lena Olin — Maya Dardel

Best Short Film

- The Light Thief — Eva Daoud

Best Experimental Film

- Time — Retrograde — Directed by David Ellis

Best Art Direction

- Ghosts on the Road to Camalt — Directed by Jason Tovey

Best Music Video

- God Came 'Round — Directed by Derek Frey

Best Student Film

- Muñecas — Directed by Ozzy Ozuna

Gustav Meyrink Prize (Jury Prize)

- Collector — Directed by Alexei Krasovsky

=== 2016 ===
Grand Prix

- Sinking of Sozopol — Directed by Kostadin Bonev

Best Feature Film

- Despite the Falling Snow — Directed by Shamim Sarif

Best Director

- Kostadin Bonev — Sinking of Sozopol

Best Screenplay

- Angelo Orlando — Rocco Has Your Name

Best Cinematography

- Konstantin Zankov — Sinking of Sozopol

Best Actor

- Michele Venitucci — Rocco Has Your Name

Best Actress

- Rebecca Ferguson — Despite the Falling Snow

Best Supporting Actor

- Anthony Head — Despite the Falling Snow

Best Short Film

- Cora — Directed by Kevin Maxwell

Best Experimental Film

- NO SIGNAL — Directed by David Ellis

Best Animated Film

- The Snow Queen 2 — Directed by Aleksey Tsitsilin

Best Comedy Film

- Seth — Directed by Zach Lasry

Best Horror Film

- Woods — Directed by Sean van Leijenhorst

Best Art Direction

- Forgiveness — Directed by Rima Irani

Best Special Effects

- Forgiveness — Directed by Rima Irani

Best Music Score

- Green Lake — Directed by Derek Frey

Best Music Video

- FIRE by The Winery Dogs — Directed by Steven Lyon

== See also ==
- List of film festivals in the Czech Republic
