= Giant's Kettle (film) =

- Directed by: Markku Hakala; Mari Käki
- Written by: Markku Hakala
- Produced by: Mari Käki
- Starring: Kirsi Paananen; Henri Malkki; Atte Vuori
- Cinematography: Markku Hakala
- Release date: 2023
- Running time: 71 minutes
- Country: Finland
- Language: Finnish

Giant's Kettle (Finnish: Hiidenkirnu) is a 2023 Finnish silent black and white experimental drama film directed by Markku Hakala and Mari Käki. The film stars Kirsi Paananen, Henri Malkki, and Atte Vuori in lead roles. The screenplay was written by Markku Hakala, who also served as the cinematographer, while Mari Käki produced the film.

== Plot ==
The film explores themes of alienation, set against the backdrop of Finland's rugged landscapes. The title refers to a geological formation created by glacial meltwater.

Set in a retro-dystopian world of alternative 1970s Finland, the film follows an unfulfilled factory researcher, played by Henri Malkki, and a woman, portrayed by Kirsi Paananen, as they navigate a male-dominated environment. The film begins with a seemingly typical boy-meets-girl scenario, as they get married and have a child, but quickly the film evolves into a dark and surreal family drama. Without dialogue, the story unfolds through static, single-shot scenes. As the couple embarks on a family trip, their lives spiral into chaos.

== Release ==
Giant's Kettle premiered at the 2023 Tallinn Black Nights Film Festival.

== Awards ==
The film won the Best Director and Best Experimental Film awards at the 2024 Prague Independent Film Festival.

== Cast ==
- Kirsi Paananen
- Henri Malkki
- Atte Vuori

== Production ==
The film was directed by Markku Hakala and Mari Käki, with Hakala also handling cinematography and writing the screenplay. Käki also produced the film. Giant's Kettle is a completely independent production, with no government funding. The production period lasted six years.
