= Maya Dardel =

- Directed by: Zachary Cotler; Magdalena Zyzak
- Written by: Zachary Cotler; Magdalena Zyzak
- Produced by: Craig R. Johnson; Mike S. Ryan; Morgan Jon Fox; Dariusz Jablonski; Violetta Kaminska; Izabela Wojcik
- Starring: Lena Olin; Jordan Gavaris; Alexander Koch; Nathan Keyes; Rosanna Arquette
- Cinematography: Patrick Scola
- Edited by: Osman Bayraktaroglu
- Music by: Zachary Cotler
- Production companies: The Winter Film Company; Greyshack Films; Message Film
- Distributed by: Samuel Goldwyn Films; Orion Pictures
- Release dates: March 12, 2017 (South by Southwest); October 27, 2017 (United States)
- Running time: 104 minutes
- Countries: United States; Poland
- Language: English

Maya Dardel is a 2017 drama film written and directed by Zachary Cotler and Magdalena Zyzak, starring Lena Olin, Jordan Gavaris, Alexander Koch, Nathan Keyes, and Rosanna Arquette.

It premiered in the Narrative Competition at the 2017 South by Southwest Film Festival and was acquired by Samuel Goldwyn Films and Orion Pictures.

== Plot ==
The film portrays the final weeks leading to the ambiguous disappearance of Maya Dardel, an internationally respected poet and novelist of Scandinavian origins, who has been living as a recluse for decades high up in the Santa Cruz Mountains of California. Maya announces on National Public Radio that she intends to end her life and that young male writers may compete to become executor of her estate. Men drive up the mountain and are challenged intellectually, emotionally, and erotically, until one of them begins to fathom Maya's end game.

== Cast ==
- Lena Olin as Maya
- Alexander Koch as Paul
- Nathan Keyes as Ansel
- Jordan Gavaris C Kevin
- Rosanna Arquette as Leonora

== Reception ==
On the review aggregator website Rotten Tomatoes, 60% of 15 critics' reviews are positive. Metacritic, which uses a weighted average, assigned the film a score of 53 out of 100, based on 8 critics, indicating "mixed or average" reviews.

== Accolades ==
Cotler and Zyzak received Best Director for Maya Dardel at the 2017 Raindance Film Festival.

The film won two awards at the 2017 Prague Independent Film Festival as Best Screenplay and Best Actress (Lena Olin).
