= When I'm a Moth =

- Directed by: Zachary Cotler; Magdalena Zyzak
- Screenplay by: Zachary Cotler
- Produced by: Zachary Cotler; Magdalena Zyzak
- Starring: Addison Timlin
- Cinematography: Lyn Moncrief
- Production company: The Winter Film Company
- Release dates: April 12, 2019 (San Francisco Film Festival); August 27, 2021 (Dark Star Pictures)
- Country: United States
- Languages: English; Japanese

When I'm a Moth is a 2019 American independent drama film directed by Zachary Cotler and Magdalena Zyzak and starring Addison Timlin as Hillary Clinton, then Hillary Rodham. The film is set in 1969 and depicts Rodham during the summer she worked in Alaska following her graduation from Wellesley College. Cotler has stated that the film is "not a biopic".

== Cast ==
- Addison Timlin as Hillary Rodham
- TJ Kayama as Ryohei
- Toshiji Takeshima as Mitsuru

== Production and release ==
The film was shot in late 2016. Its world premiere was on April 12, 2019, at the San Francisco Film Festival. It was released by Dark Star Pictures on August 27, 2021 after a delay caused by the COVID-19 pandemic.

== Reception ==
The film received polarized reviews, attracting praise from independent critics, and largely negative responses from more mainstream publications. The review aggregator Rotten Tomatoes reported an approval rating of 36% based on 11 reviews.

Several critics questioned the premise of the film, with Caryn James of The Hollywood Reporter calling the movie "pointless." Dennis Harvey of Variety called the film "an insufferably pretentious arthouse drama." Other critics disagreed, with reviewers at Hammer to Nail and Screen-Space considering the film an "experiment" and an attempt to analyze how Hillary Clinton is seen in America respectively.

Some critics liked the script, others considered it "pretentious." Nonetheless, the cinematography was largely praised, with Film Threat calling it "beautiful." The "atmosphere" created was considered a highlight by Less Hat, Moorhead and Movie Nation. Addison Timlin's performance was also largely praised, though Film Threat's review stated, "It's difficult to determine whether Timlin's aggravated rigidity is intentional or if she just can't act."
