= Marisela Zumbado =

American actress

- Born: December 11, 1992 (age 33); Miami, Florida, U.S.
- Occupation: Actress
- Years active: 2011–present
- Relatives: Carmela Zumbado (sister); Gigi Zumbado (sister)

Marisela Zumbado is an American actress. She is best known for playing Tracy in the drama series Good Trouble.

== Early life ==
Zumbado was born in Miami, Florida on December 11, 1992 to Tony and Lilliam Zumbado. Her sisters Gigi and Carmela are also actresses. She is of Cuban and Colombian descent and is a first generation American.

== Career ==
Early on in her career Zumbado appeared in the horror film Countdown. Her first big role came when she played Lucia in the dramedy series Generation. She is best known for her role as Tracy in the drama series Good Trouble. She played Ana Machado in an episode of Law & Order and Law and Order: Special Victims Unit.

== Personal life ==
Zumbado is lesbian and is currently in a relationship with actress Sherry Cola.

== Filmography ==
=== Film ===
Year	Title	Role	Notes
2011	Play Dead	Sister Zombie	Short
2013	+1	Screaming Girl	
2015	Lila & Eve	Joie	
2015	The DUFF	Nora	
2015	Pitch Perfect 2	The Cantasticos	
2016	Jack Reacher: Never Go Back	Smuggled Woman	
2017	Hot Seat	Ashley	Short
2018	Juicy Stories	Juana Gonzales	
2019	Countdown	Kate	
2022	Work	Gabi	Short

=== Television ===
Year	Title	Role	Notes
2012	The Inbetweeners	Student	Episode: "Class Clown"
2014	Banshee	June Cleary	2 episodes
2015	The Originals	Teen Girl	3 episodes
2015	Scream	Ruby Nicholson	Episode: "Hello, Emma"
2017	It's Always Sunny in Philadelphia	Sorority Girl	Episode: "PTSDee"
2018	Goliath	Luz	Episode: "Fresh Flowers"
2018	The Affair	Blanca	3 episodes
2019	Lethal Weapon	Ana	Episode: "Coyote Ugly"
2020	Deputy	Izzy	Episode: "10-8 School Ties"
2021	Generation	Lucia	7 episodes
2021	On the Verge	Emily	2 episodes
2021	The Rookie	Leilani	Episode: "Five Minutes"
2022-2024	Good Trouble	Tracy	15 episodes
2024	Station 19	Maritza Zamora	2 episodes
2025	Law & Order: Special Victims Unit	Ana Machado	Episode: "Play with Fire Part 2"
2025	Law & Order	Ana Machado	Episode: "Play with Fire Part 1"
2026	Margo's Got Money Troubles	Katie	2 episodes
