= Arab Film Festival =

Film festival

- Location: California, United States
- Founded: 1996
- Hosted by: Arab Film and Media Institute
- Website: Official website

The Arab Film Festival (AFF) is the flagship program of the Arab Film and Media Institute (AFMI) a nonprofit organization that hosts the largest and longest-running independent Arab film festival in the United States. It is held in California each year in San Francisco, Los Angeles, San Jose, San Diego, and Berkeley.

== Overview ==
The Arab Film and Media Institute was founded in the San Francisco Bay Area in 1996 as the Arab Film Festival. It aimed to counter common stereotypes of Arabs shown in the media and provide opportunities for a new generation of Arab filmmakers to showcase their work. In addition to its annual Arab Film Festival, it also hosts individual screenings throughout the year.

== Leadership ==
Several prominent Arab-Americans have been involved with the Festival throughout the years, among them actor Tony Shalhoub and media critic Jack Shaheen. Both serve on its advisory board. The Festival is run by Executive Director Serge Bakalian and a Board of Directors, including Feras Mousilli, Danielle Siragusa, and Hisham Zawil.
