= Jordan Gavaris =

Canadian actor (born 1989)

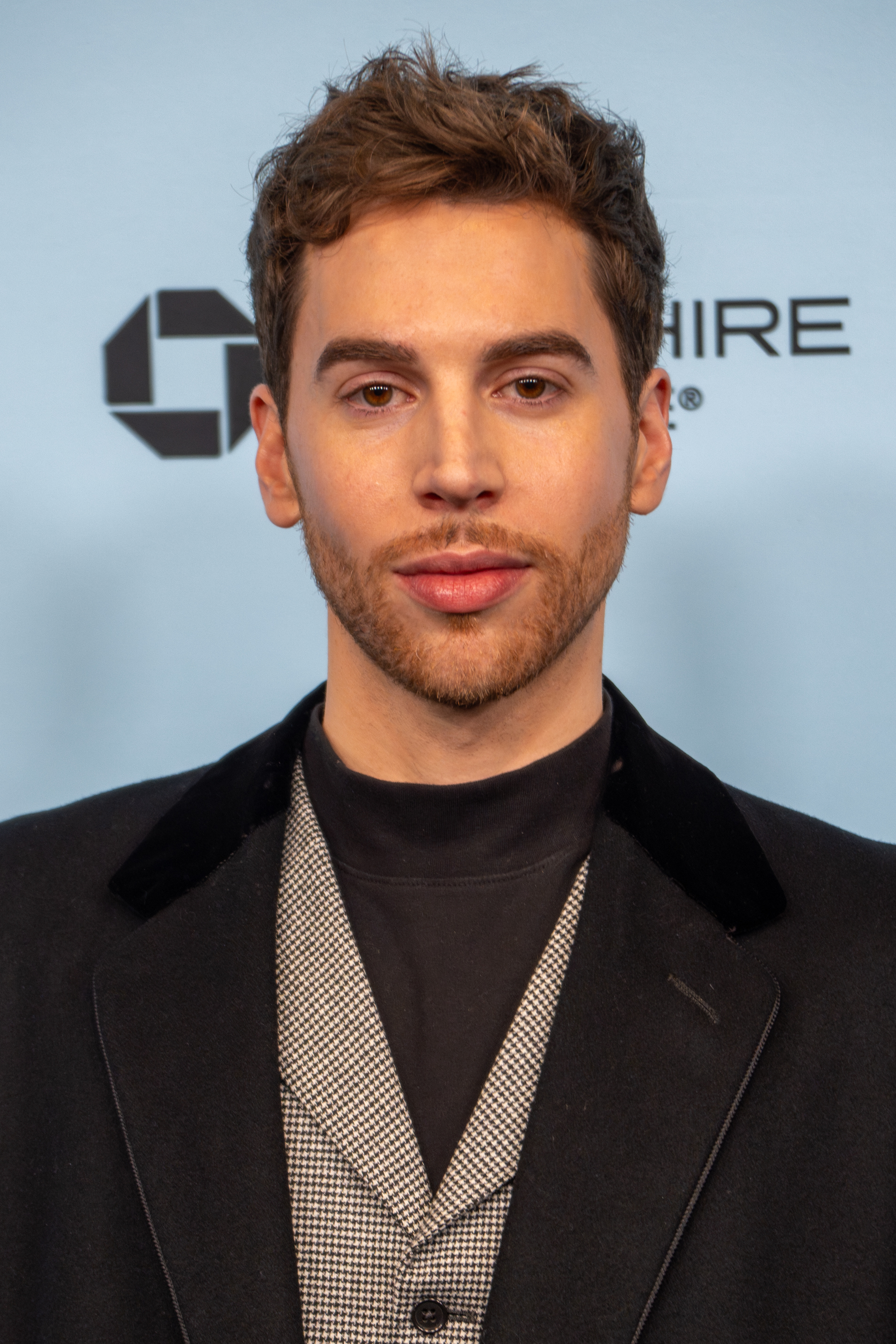
- Gavaris at the 2025 Sundance Film Festival
- Born: Jordan James Gavaris; September 25, 1989 (age 36); Brampton, Ontario, Canada
- Occupation: Actor
- Years active: 2008–present
- Spouse: Devon Graye (m. 2018)

Jordan James Gavaris (born September 25, 1989) is a Canadian actor. He is best known for his role as Felix Dawkins in the BBC America and Space television series Orphan Black (2013–2017). He is the lead actor in The Lake (2022–2023) opposite Julia Stiles.

== Early life ==
Gavaris was born in Brampton and raised in Caledon, Ontario, Canada. His father is a Greek immigrant who worked for the Toronto District School Board before leaving to develop real estate in Toronto. His mother was born in Canada, and is of Northern European descent. She formerly had a career with The Globe and Mail. He is the youngest of three children. Later living in Snelgrove, he attended Mayfield Secondary School, but was not admitted into the arts program.

== Career ==
Gavaris made his feature film debut in the Canadian independent film, 45 R.P.M. opposite Michael Madsen, Kim Coates, and Amanda Plummer. In 2010, Gavaris co-starred in the Cartoon Network live-action series Unnatural History. Gavaris also co-starred in the original drama Orphan Black for BBC America and Canada's Space.

In 2010, Gavaris was honoured by Playback, Panavision Canada, and The Canadian Film and Television Hall of Fame by being named one of 2010's "Top Ten to Watch".

In 2014, Gavaris won a Canadian Screen Award for Best Supporting Actor and also won a Constellation Award for best performance in an episode. On August 18, 2014, Gavaris was announced as the winner of the 2014 EWwy Award for Best Supporting Actor in a Drama Series.

In 2016, Gavaris appeared in a supporting role in the film Sea of Trees, directed by Gus Van Sant and starring Matthew McConaughey and Ken Watanabe, and 2017 saw him co-star with Lena Olin in the arthouse film Maya Dardel. The film premiered at the SXSW Film Festival to generally favorable reviews.

=== In the media ===
The English accent Gavaris employs for his role as Felix Dawkins has been noted for its authenticity, despite Gavaris not being English. Entertainment Weekly writer Dalton Ross has stated that he is "not entirely convinced that it's not his normal accent that he's faking." Gavaris told Ross that Michiel Huisman, Jerome Flynn and Maria Doyle Kennedy all thought he was English:

When I lost the affectation after the read-through, Maria [Kennedy] was shocked. I think using an accent or affectation has given me a freedom as Felix I may not have otherwise found. The role has been by far the most liberating experience that anyone my age could have. There are so few colorful characters for people my age, it's a real treat to get to experiment in character work.

== Personal life ==
Gavaris is openly gay. He started dating actor and screenwriter Devon Graye in September 2013. The two married in 2018.

Gavaris said in August 2017 that his role in Orphan Black helped him understand feminism, and that he considers himself a feminist.

== Filmography ==
Film
Year	Title	Role	Notes
2008	45 R.P.M.	Parry Tender	
2013	Curse of Chucky	U.S. Ex Delivery Guy	
2015	Sea of Trees	Eric	
2017	Maya Dardel	Kevin	
2025	Wish You Were Here	Chucky	
2025	Touch Me	Craig	

Television
Year	Title	Role	Notes
2008	G2G: Got to Go!	Barry	Unknown episodes
2009	Degrassi: The Next Generation	Nathan	2 episodes
2010	Unnatural History	Jasper Bartlett	Lead role; 13 episodes
2013–2017	Orphan Black	Felix Dawkins	Main role Canadian Screen Award for Best Performance by an Actor in a Featured Supporting Role in a Dramatic Program or Series (2014, 2015); Constellation Award for Best Male Performance in a 2013 Science Fiction Television Episode (2014); EWwy Award for Best Supporting Actor in a Drama Series (2014)
2013	Cracked	Grant Mackenzie	Episode: "The Valley"
2018	Take Two	Mick English	Recurring role
2019	The Coop	Prince	Lead role
2020	Love in the Time of Corona	Sean	Recurring role
2022–2023	The Lake	Justin Lovejoy	Lead role
2023	Orphan Black: Echoes	Felix Dawkins	2 episodes
2024	Hacks	Logan	3 episodes
