= The Death of Robin Hood =

2026 film by Michael Sarnoski

- Theatrical release poster
- Directed by: Michael Sarnoski
- Written by: Michael Sarnoski
- Based on: Robin Hood's Death by Anonymous
- Produced by: Aaron Ryder; Andrew Swett; Alexander Black; Hugh Jackman
- Starring: Hugh Jackman; Jodie Comer; Bill Skarsgård; Murray Bartlett; Noah Jupe
- Cinematography: Pat Scola
- Edited by: Andrew Mondshein
- Music by: Jim Ghedi
- Production companies: Lyrical Media; Ryder Picture Company
- Distributed by: A24
- Release dates: June 12, 2026 (Sydney); June 19, 2026 (United States)
- Running time: 122 minutes
- Country: United States
- Language: English
- Budget: $20 million
- Box office: $9.5 million

The Death of Robin Hood is a 2026 American thriller film starring Hugh Jackman as Robin Hood in a dark adaptation of the 17th-century ballad Robin Hood's Death. Written and directed by Michael Sarnoski, the film also stars Jodie Comer, Bill Skarsgård, Murray Bartlett, and Noah Jupe with supporting roles by Faith Delaney and Clive Russell. It follows an aged Robin, who is tormented by his past killings as an outlaw and living in self-imposed exile. When he is wounded fighting an elderfather, Robin takes refuge in a priory, where he befriends the prioress and an orphaned girl.

Filming took place in Northern Ireland in 2025 under the production of Lyrical Media and RPC. It premiered at the 73rd Sydney Film Festival on June 12, 2026, and was released in the United States on June 19, 2026, by A24. It received mixed reviews from critics.

== Plot ==
In 1247 England, a young woman named Wainwright tracks down the legendary outlaw Robin Hood. Living alone in the wilderness and troubled by his murderous past, the aged Robin dismisses the tales that have made him a folk hero. The young Wainwright tries to kill Robin, seeking to avenge her kin who lie among his past victims, but he kills her instead and buries her alongside the many others who have sought the same revenge.

Robin is visited by his oldest friend and fellow bandit, Little John, who tells Robin that most of their old followers, including Will Scarlet, have been executed or murdered. Now living as Edward, a farmer whose life he took, John enlists Robin's help in retaking his farm and his wife Margaret from the family who own his land. The two journey for several days, with John killing and robbing someone on the road for a loaf of bread.

The two outlaws raid the farm, slaughtering several men and saving John's daughter, Margaret the younger, but his wife is killed. Robin shoots down a boy, Hendrie, to stop him warning the others, but Hendrie reaches his family with an arrow through his head. Hendrie dies soon after, and a ceremony for his death is held. The family set fire to Little John's farm, and Robin is gravely wounded as he fights them off and duels the clan's elderfather, who is killed by John.

John leaves the delirious Robin on a remote island, at the Priory of St. Clement, where he is nursed back to health by the prioress, Sister Brigid. Using the name Randolph, Robin meets the priory's caretaker, a leper, and a traumatized Margaret escapes to the island after her father is killed, but soon runs away. Robin finds her, sparing her life after realizing she does not know about his or her father's past, and takes her under his wing, teaching her to hunt as he helps provide for the priory.

Brigid helps Robin and Margaret recover, and Robin finds himself following the prioress to a secluded cave, watching as she pleasures herself. An injured young man named Arthur arrives, and Robin suspects he belongs to Hendrie's vengeful family who killed John and intends to kill Margaret. On his deathbed, the leper reveals that he recognizes Robin, as he himself is the outlaw's former enemy Guy of Gisbourne who Robin had convinced himself was only a character from the fictitious legends surrounding him. Urging Robin to embrace a new life, Guy warns him never to reveal the truth to Brigid, as her husband was among Robin's victims.

Determined to protect Margaret, Robin rows to the mainland with Arthur and forces him to admit that he is actually Godwyn, the last surviving male member of Hendrie's family. Robin convinces him to abandon his quest for vengeance and go home to the family that he has left. Returning to Brigid, Robin confesses that he is Robin Hood, much to her horror. That night, while she treats him with bloodletting, Brigid reveals that her own family were among his victims, as the outlaw burned her husband and children alive. Briefly, she considers killing him in revenge.

After John appears to him in a dream, Robin convinces Brigid to help him die through bloodletting, unable to bear the guilt of his former life. Though she suggests that his monstrous crimes led her to a new life of healing others, Robin chooses not to let Brigid stop his bleeding. He tells Margaret the tale of befriending John and the heroic version of their lives together, swearing her to secrecy about her father's past. Giving her a bow that he had made her and guiding her how to shoot, Robin dies as Margaret lets an arrow fly.

== Cast ==
- Hugh Jackman as Robin Hood, a skilled archer, murderous brigand who is in his final years
- Jodie Comer as Sister Brigid, the prioress of a rural nunnery, a healer
- Bill Skarsgård as Little John, Robin Hood's oldest and most loyal companion, now living under a false identity as a farmer named "Edward"
- Murray Bartlett as The Leper/Guy of Gisbourne, an old enemy of Robin Hood who is being treated by Sister Brigid for leprosy
- Noah Jupe as Arthur/Godwyn, a shepherd who is the last male of his family after the others were killed by Little John
- Faith Delaney as Little Margaret, the daughter of Little John
- Clive Russell as the Elderfather, a relative of Godwyn who fought Robin Hood and Little John
- Jade Croot as Wainwright, a woman who tried to kill Robin Hood
- Katie Breen as Margaret, the wife of Little John and mother of Little Margaret
- Alfie McCracken as the unnamed father of Hendrie who abducted Margaret and Little Margaret
- Alfie Lawless as Hendrie, the cousin of Godwyn
- Amy McElhatton as Hendrie's aunt
- Maeve Connelly as Hendrie's great-aunt
- Maggie Hayes as Hendrie's Grandmother
- Richie Wilson as Godwyn Sr., the father of Godwyn
- Elijah Ungvary as a hairy kinsman
- Tabitha Smyth as Sarah
- Beau Thompson as Hob
- Asher De Silva as Moshe

== Production ==
In May 2024, it was announced that a dark re-imagining of the Robin Hood legend was in development, with Michael Sarnoski writing and directing, and Hugh Jackman and Jodie Comer starring. Lyrical Media financed the film and produced alongside Ryder Picture Company (RPC). Shortly thereafter, A24 acquired U.S. rights to the film for $4 million in a competitive situation at the Marché du Film.

In February 2025, Bill Skarsgård, Murray Bartlett, and Noah Jupe were added to the cast. Principal photography began in early February 2025, in Northern Ireland. A March 2025 press release from the Northern Ireland Executive Office said filming took place at Belfast Harbour Studios and on location at Silent Valley, Glenarm, and Murlough Bay, with post-production at Yellowmoon in Holywood, County Down. According to director Sarnoski, the crew filmed for over just 30 days, with the scenes on the farm taking three days, and the set wrapped by late March. Pat Scola served as cinematographer for the film and it was shot on 35 mm film.

=== Music ===
During post-production, Jim Ghedi composed the score.

=== Release ===
The Death of Robin Hood premiered at the 73rd Sydney Film Festival on June 12, 2026, and was released in the United States by A24 on June 19, 2026.

== Reception ==
On the review aggregator website Rotten Tomatoes, 69% of 189 critics' reviews are positive, with an average rating of 6.3/10. The website's consensus reads: "Swapping out derring-do for ultraviolence, this grim take on the merry legend of Robin Hood could use some more levity in its quiver, but its aim of exploring the complicated humanity behind a folk hero nails the target." Metacritic, which uses a weighted average, assigned the film a score of 61 out of 100, based on 38 critics, indicating "generally favorable" reviews. Audiences polled by CinemaScore gave the film an average grade of "C+" on an A+ to F scale.

Tim Grierson of ScreenDaily determined the film to be "rich in atmosphere but hamstrung by an excessively brooding approach". Writing for RogerEbert.com, Brandon David Wilson called the film "the most interesting takes on the character in recent memory" in a 3.5 stars out of 4 review. In The Wall Street Journal, Kyle Smith praised the film's "brutish atmosphere" but viewed the violence as over the top and as a distraction from storytelling, writing that there is "only so much you can do with raw savagery". Alissa Wilkinson of The New York Times also found the violence tedious, especially in the first half of the film, though she praised the performances of the cast.
