= Alexander Koch (actor) =

American actor

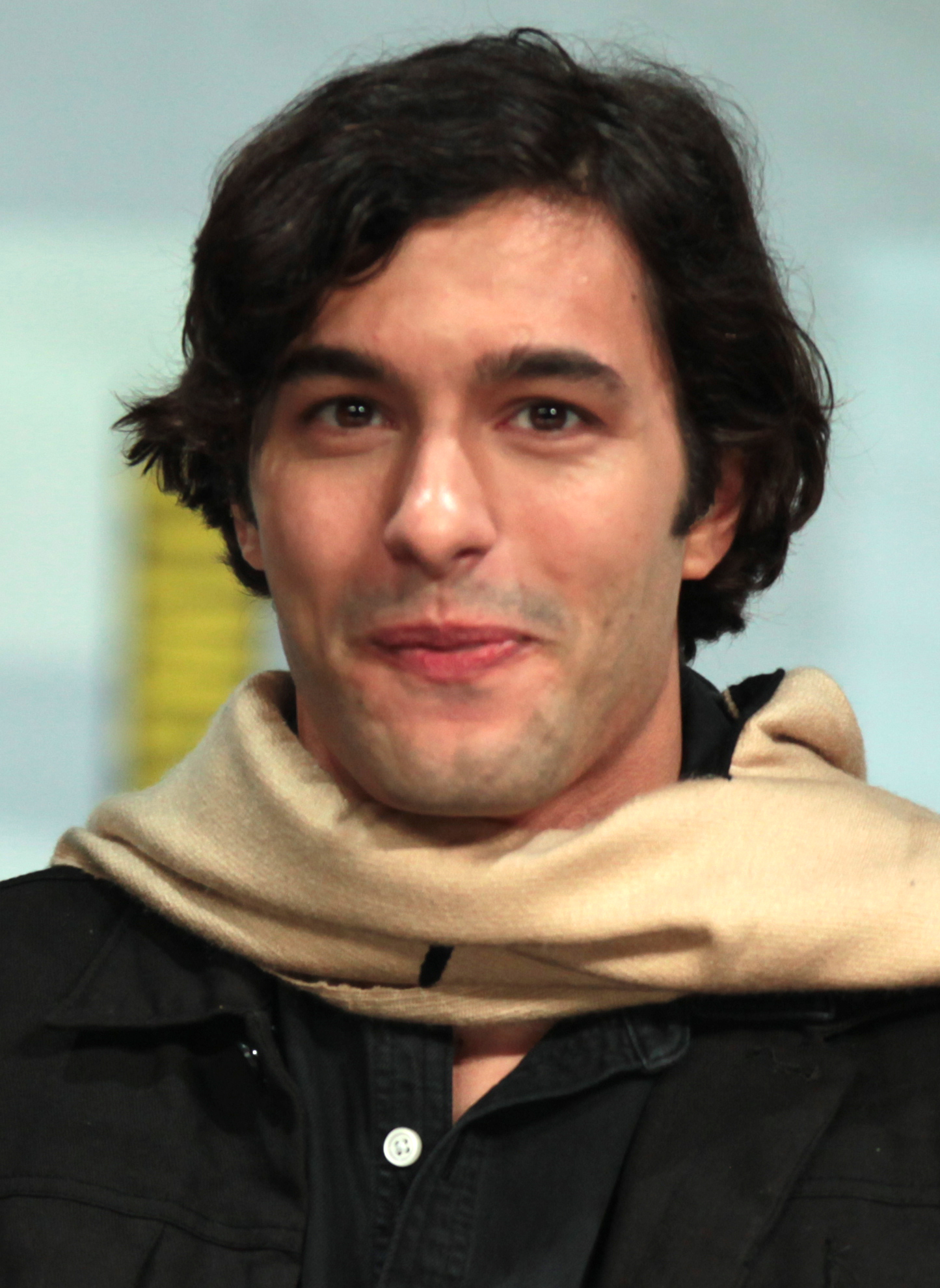
- Koch at the 2014 San Diego Comic-Con
- Education: DePaul University (BFA)
- Occupation: Actor
- Years active: 2011–present

Alexander Koch is an American actor. He played the series regular role of Junior Rennie on the CBS drama series Under the Dome, based on the novel by Stephen King. Alex Koch appears in the fifth season of Lucifer as Ella Lopez's new love interest, Pete Daily. He co-starred in the 2020 meta-thriller Black Bear.

== Life and career ==
Koch is the son of Joseph and Joya Koch. He has two older sisters, Ashleigh and Michelle. His father is late Wayne County assistant prosecutor Joseph Koch. "It was kind of my first introduction into acting, because I would go to the courtroom with him and watch him work," recalls Koch of his dad, who died in 2001. "When he was presenting cases and what-not, it was almost as if he was doing monologues".

Koch graduated from Grosse Pointe South High School in 2006. Koch was heavily involved in both local community and high school theater productions.

He attended The Theatre School at DePaul University and immersed himself in productions such as A Lie of the Mind, Hair, Intimate Apparel, Normal, Assassins and Reefer Madness: The Musical. In 2012, he received his BFA in acting. Koch made his film debut as "Frank" in Eddie O'Keefe's independent short film The Ghosts. Koch works with music and images when acting. "When I'm working, I like to work with a lot of music. The more I can think of what a character would listen to, the more I feel like I have a place to create from". [Alexander agrees that he's using songs to give him insights into his character and not just to get him into an emotional space]. "I have a record player at home that I usually listen to, but since I've been in Wilmington [North Carolina, where the series is filming], I couldn't bring it with me. When I'm on set, I'm listening through headphones on my computer, just trying to zone in and focus. Britt [Robertson] always makes fun of me about how I'm always in my chair listening to music". He also works with images. "When I'm working, I find images and kind of attach to them. It just makes the dialogue so much stronger if you have a distinct image in your mind".

== Filmography ==
=== Film ===
Year	Title	Role	Notes
2008	Brüder im Herrn	Mark	Short film
2011	The Ghosts	Frank	Short film
2011	Winter	Charlie	Short film
2016	Always Shine	Matt	film
2017	Maya Dardel	Paul	film
2018	Big Fork	Kipton	film
2020	Black Bear	Mike	film
2020	Sightless	Clayton	film
2023	Happiness for Beginners	Duncan	film

=== Television ===
Year	Title	Role	Notes
2012	Underemployed	—N/a	Episode: "The Trivial Pursuit"
2013–2015	Under the Dome	James "Junior" Rennie	Main role (39 episodes)
2017	Parked	Mark	Television film
2018	Sorry for Your Loss	Nicholas Schwaback	Episode: "I Want a Party"
2019	The Code	Bard	3 episodes
2020	Lucifer	Pete Daily	3 Episodes
2022	Law & Order: Special Victims Unit	Nick Pearce aka Luke	1 Episode
2025	Hacks	Dev	3 Episodes
2026	The Hunting Party (TV series)	Eric Rosa	1 Episode

=== Music videos ===
Year	Song	Artist(s)	Director(s)	Role
2017	"Issues"	Julia Michaels	Tabitha Denholm	Male Lead
2019	"Something to Do"	Vivian Girls	Jason Lester	Cassie's Boyfriend
