= Nathan Keyes =

American actor (born 1985)

- Born: Nathan William Gumke; November 28, 1985 (age 40); Washington, D.C., United States
- Occupation: Actor
- Years active: 2006–present

Nathan Keyes, born Nathan William Gumke, (born November 28, 1985) is an American actor, known for his roles as Kevin Levin in Ben 10: Alien Swarm and Ansel in Maya Dardel.

== Life and career ==
Keyes was born in Washington, D.C., to Holly and Dale Gumke, but raised in York, Pennsylvania with younger brother Chris. When he was seven, he wrote, produced, directed and acted in a play based on The Tailor of Gloucester. He played his first stage role when he was eleven, and went on to star in theatrical roles such as Romeo, in Romeo and Juliet, the Scarecrow in The Wizard of Oz, the Emcee in Cabaret, and Albert in Bye, Bye Birdie. He also starred in Bang Bang, You're Dead, a play about school violence, presented in high schools in York County, Pennsylvania. Keyes attended York Suburban High School. In 2000, he founded the pop band "As 1", performing in more than seventy-five concerts throughout the northeast.

After graduating in 2004, Keyes moved to Los Angeles, where he started working as graphic designer and photographer of CD covers. Meanwhile, he studied acting with coach Stephanie Feury. He landed a recurring role on ABC Family's Three Moons Over Milford, and has guest starred on shows like CBS's Numb3rs and ABC's No Ordinary Family. In 2009, he joined the cast of the movie Ben 10: Alien Swarm, portraiting Kevin Levin.

== Filmography ==
Film and television
Year	Title	Role	Notes
2006	Numb3rs	Paul Elins	TV series, episode 2x19. Credited as "Nathan William Keyes"
2006	The Nature of Blake	Blake	Short
2006	Three Moons Over Milford	Jonah	TV series, 4 episodes
2007	Women's Murder Club	Thaddeus Prescott	TV series, episode 1x09
2009	Mrs. Washington Goes to Smith	Alec Washington	TV movie
2009	Ben 10: Alien Swarm	Kevin Levin	TV movie
2010	The Sleepy Count	Thomas	Short
2010	Brothers & Sisters	Sam	TV series, episode 4x13
2010	No Ordinary Family	Lucas Fisher	TV series, pilot
2011	Worst. Prom. Ever.	Colin O'Flaherty	TV movie
2011	The Good Doctor	Rich	Feature film
2012	Anatomy of the Tide	Donny Brewer	Feature film
2012	The Dark Knight Smells		Short
2013	The Kings of Summer	Paul	Feature film
2013	Cleaners	Kyle	6 episodes
2014	Blood & Circumstance	Joel	Feature film
2014	Glee	Andrew Cosgrove	Episode 'The Back-Up Plan'
2014	Come Back to Me	Dale	Feature film
2016	J.L. Family Ranch	Terrence	TV movie
2017	Britney Ever After	Justin Timberlake	TV movie
2017	Maya Dardel	Ansel	Feature film
2018	Unintended	Bill (Adult)	Feature film
