= Lena Olin =

Swedish actress (born 1955)

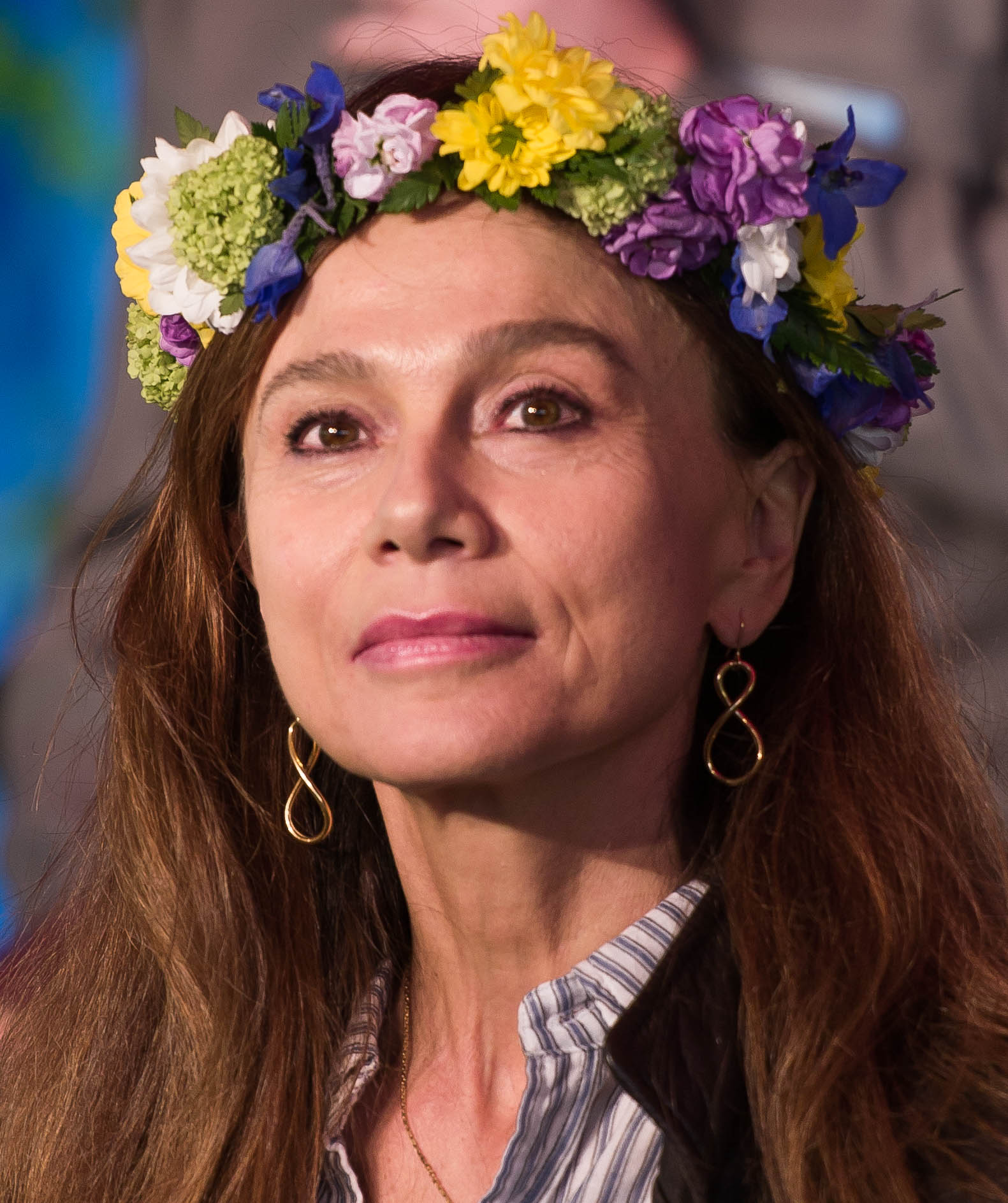
- Olin in 2015
- Born: Lena Maria Jonna Olin; 22 March 1955 (age 71); Stockholm, Sweden
- Education: Swedish National Academy of Mime and Acting
- Occupation: Actress
- Years active: 1976–present
- Spouse: Lasse Hallström (m. 1994)
- Children: 2
- Parent(s): Britta Holmberg; Stig Olin

Lena Maria Jonna Olin (Swedish pronunciation: [ˈlêːna ʊˈliːn]; born 22 March 1955) is a Swedish actress. She has received nominations for an Academy Award, a Golden Globe Award, a BAFTA Award, and a Primetime Emmy Award.

Mentored by filmmaker Ingmar Bergman, she made her screen debut with a small role in his film Face to Face (1976). After graduating from drama school, Olin joined the Royal Dramatic Theatre, followed by roles in Bergman's films Fanny and Alexander (1982) and After the Rehearsal (1984). She made her international breakthrough in the role of a free-spirited artist in The Unbearable Lightness of Being (1988), which earned her a nomination for the Golden Globe Award for Best Supporting Actress – Motion Picture.

Olin garnered further critical acclaim for her portrayals of a traumatized Holocaust survivor in the dramedy Enemies, A Love Story (1989), based on the novel by Isaac Bashevis Singer, for which she received a nomination for the Academy Award for Best Supporting Actress, and an abused wife in the comedy-drama Chocolat (2000), for which she received a nomination for the BAFTA Award for Best Actress in a Supporting Role. Her other film roles include The Adventures of Picasso (1978), Havana (1990), Romeo Is Bleeding (1993), Mr. Jones (1993), The Ninth Gate (1999), Queen of the Damned (2002), Casanova (2005), The Reader (2008), Remember Me (2010), Maya Dardel (2017), and The Artist's Wife (2019).

On television, Olin starred as KGB agent Irina Derevko on the spy thriller Alias (2002–2006), which earned her a nomination for the Primetime Emmy Award for Outstanding Supporting Actress in a Drama Series. Her other television roles include the sitcom Welcome to Sweden (2014–2015), the drama series Riviera (2017–2020), and the drama series Hunters (2020–2023).

== Early life and education ==
Lena Maria Jonna Olin was born on 22 March 1955, in Stockholm, Sweden, the youngest of three children of actors Britta Holmberg and Stig Olin. Olin worked as a nursing assistant and as a substitute teacher before starting drama school. She studied at Sweden's National Academy of Dramatic Art from 1976 to 1979.

In October 1974, at age 19, Olin was crowned Miss Scandinavia in Helsinki, Finland.

== Career ==
Lena Olin in 2026.

Olin performed for over a decade with Sweden's Royal Dramatic Theatre-ensemble (1980–1994) in plays by William Shakespeare and August Strindberg, and appeared in smaller roles of several Swedish films directed by Bergman and in productions of Swedish Television's TV-Theatre Company.

Ingmar Bergman cast Olin in Face to Face (1976). A year later, she began acting on the national stage in Stockholm in productions directed by Bergman. She toured internationally with Bergman's production of King Lear (in which Olin played Cordelia), including Paris, Berlin, New York, Copenhagen, Moscow, and Oslo. Critically acclaimed stage performances by Olin at Sweden's Royal Dramatic Theatre included the leading part as The Daughter in A Dream Play by Strindberg; Margarita in the stage adaptation of The Master and Margarita by Mikhail Bulgakov; Carlo Goldoni's The Servant of Two Masters; Ann in Edward Bond's Summer; Titania in A Midsummer Night's Dream by Shakespeare; Ben Jonson's The Alchemist; the title role in Ingmar Bergman's rendition of Strindberg's Miss Julie, and the neurotic Charlotte in the contemporary drama Nattvarden (The Last Supper) by Lars Norén.

In 1980, Olin was one of the earliest winners of the Ingmar Bergman Award at the Guldbagge Awards, initiated in 1978 by the director himself, who was also one of the two judges.

Olin's international debut in film was a small role in Bergman's Fanny and Alexander (1980), with Bergman later casting her in her first international lead role, After the Rehearsal (1984). In 1988, Olin starred with Daniel Day-Lewis and Juliette Binoche in her first major role in an English-speaking and internationally produced film, The Unbearable Lightness of Being. She also appeared in Sydney Pollack's Havana (1990) and Roman Polanski's The Ninth Gate (1999).

In 1989, Olin was nominated for the Academy Award for Best Supporting Actress, for Enemies, A Love Story, in which she portrayed the survivor of a Nazi death camp.

She starred in the 1993 thriller Romeo Is Bleeding, and in the 1999 American superhero comedy film Mystery Men.

Olin and director Lasse Hallström collaborated on the film Chocolat (2000), which received five Academy Award nominations. She worked with him again on Casanova (2005) and in the 2024 TV series The Darkness.

In 2002, Olin appeared in her first American television role, joining the main cast of Alias for its second season, playing the role of Irina Derevko. For her work on the series, Olin was nominated for the Primetime Emmy Award for Outstanding Supporting Actress in a Drama Series in 2003.

In 2005, Olin returned to Sweden for a brief period of filming and starred in a supporting role in Danish director Simon Staho's film, Bang Bang Orangutang. In 2008, Olin appeared in the Oscar-nominated film The Reader, playing a Jewish survivor of the Auschwitz death march at a trial in the 1960s, and as the woman's daughter twenty years later.

Between 2014 and 2015, Olin starred in Swedish sitcom Welcome to Sweden. In 2017 she starred in the American-Polish independent drama film Maya Dardel, which screened at SXSW.

From 2020 to 2023 she played Eva Braun-Hitler / The Colonel, leader of the Fourth Reich and Hitler's wife, in Hunters, an American conspiracy drama television series. In 2024 she played the lead role as Detective Hulda Hermannsdóttir in the Icelandic/American Nordic Noir TV series The Darkness, directed by Lasse Hallström, with whom she had previously collaborated.

== Personal life ==
Olin has a son, August, from a relationship with actor Örjan Ramberg. Since 1994, she has been married to filmmaker Lasse Hallström, with whom she has a daughter, Tora. They reside in Bedford, New York.

== Filmography ==
=== Film ===
Year	Title	Role	Notes
1976	Face to Face	Shop Assistant	
1977	Taboo	Girl	Uncredited
1978	The Adventures of Picasso	Dolores	
1980	Love	Lena	
1982	Gräsänklingar	Nina	
1982	Fanny and Alexander	Rosa (the Ekdahl house)	
1986	Flight North	Karin	
1986	A Matter of Life and Death	Nadja Melander	
1988	The Unbearable Lightness of Being	Sabina	Nominated—Golden Globe Award for Best Supporting Actress; Nominated—National Society of Film Critics Award for Best Supporting Actress
1988	Friends	Sue	
1989	S/Y Glädjen	Annika Larsson	
1989	Enemies, A Love Story	Masha	New York Film Critics Circle Award for Best Supporting Actress; Nominated—Academy Award for Best Supporting Actress; Nominated—National Society of Film Critics Award for Best Supporting Actress
1990	Havana	Bobby Duran	
1993	Romeo Is Bleeding	Mona Demarkov	Nominated—Chicago Film Critics Association Award for Best Supporting Actress
1993	Mr. Jones	Dr. Elizabeth Bowen	
1995	The Night and the Moment	The Marquise	
1996	Night Falls on Manhattan	Peggy Lindstrom	
1998	Polish Wedding	Jadzia	
1998	Hamilton	Tessie	
1999	Mystery Men	Dr. Anabel Leek	
1999	The Ninth Gate	Liana Telfer	
2000	Chocolat	Josephine Muscat	Nominated—BAFTA Award for Best Actress in a Supporting Role; Nominated—European Film Award for Best Actress; Nominated—Screen Actors Guild Award for Outstanding Performance by a Cast in a Motion Picture
2001	Ignition	Judge Faith Mattis	
2002	Queen of the Damned	Maharet	
2002	Darkness	Maria	
2003	The United States of Leland	Marybeth Fitzgerald	
2003	Hollywood Homicide	Ruby	
2005	Casanova	Andrea	
2005	Bang Bang Orangutang	Nina	
2007	Awake	Lilith Beresford	
2008	The Reader	Rose Mather / Ilana Mather	
2010	Remember Me	Diane Hirsch	
2012	The Hypnotist	Simone Bark	
2013	The Devil You Know	Kathryn Vale	
2013	Night Train to Lisbon	Older Estefânia	
2017	Maya Dardel	Maya Dardel	Best Actress Award at the Prague Independent Film Festival
2019	The Artist's Wife	Claire Smythson	
2020	Adam	Yevgeina	
2022	Hilma	Hilma	
2023	One Life	Grete Winton	
2024	Upgraded	Catherine Laroche	
2024	Spaceman	Zdena	
2026	The Housewife	Rachel Berger	

=== Television ===
Year	Title	Role	Notes
1977	Friaren som inte ville gifta sig	Gypsy Woman	TV movie
1982	Som ni behagar	Febe	TV movie
1983	After the Rehearsal	Anna Egerman (older)	TV movie
1985	Wallenberg: A Hero's Story	Marta	TV movie
1986	Glasmästarna	Lady with Dog	TV movie
1987	Komedianter	Ann	TV movie
1990	Hebriana	Lena	TV movie
2002–2006	Alias	Irina Derevko	Main cast (season 2), recurring cast (seasons 4–5); Nominated—Primetime Emmy Award for Outstanding Supporting Actress in a Drama Series (2003); Nominated—Satellite Award for Best Supporting Actress – Television Series (2003, 2004)
2010	Law & Order: Special Victims Unit	Ingrid Block	Episode: "Confidential"
2014–2015	Welcome to Sweden	Viveka Börjesson	Main cast
2016	Vinyl	Mrs. Fineman	3 episodes
2017–2020	Riviera	Irina Atman	Main cast
2017	Mindhunter	Annaliese Stilman	Episode: "Episode 6"
2020–2023	Hunters	Eva Braun-Hitler / The Colonel	Main cast
2024	The Darkness	Detective Inspector Hulda Hermannsdóttir	Lead role
2025	Nine Perfect Strangers	Helena	Main cast (season 2)

== Awards and nominations ==
Organizations	Year	Category	Work	Result	Ref.
Stockholm International Film Festival	2026	Lifetime Achievement Award	For distinguished acting career	Honoured	
