= Craig William Macneill =

American film director

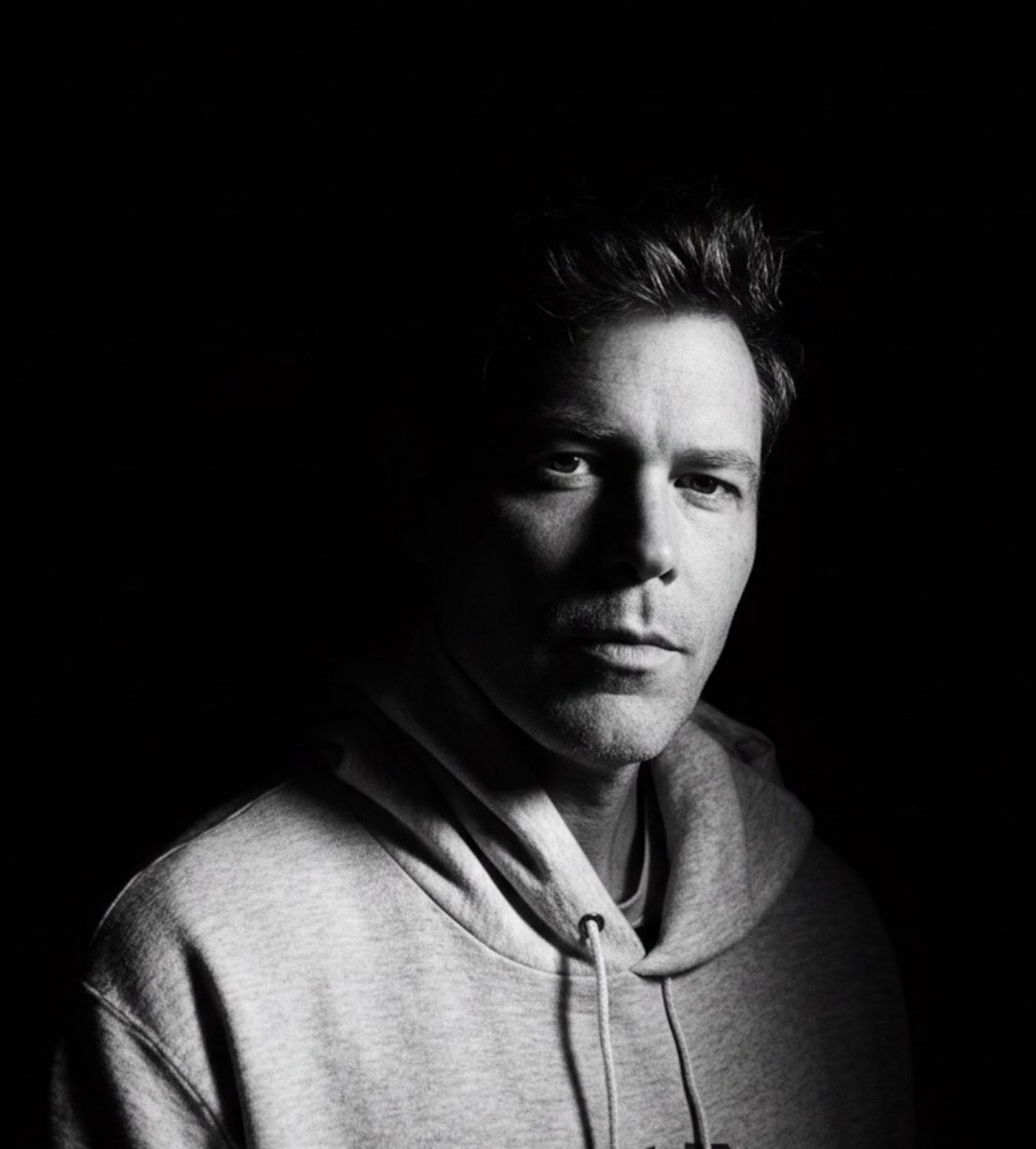

Craig William Macneill is an American film director, writer, and editor. His feature film Lizzie, starring Chloë Sevigny and Kristen Stewart, premiered in the U.S Dramatic Competition section at the 2018 Sundance Film Festival. The film was acquired by Roadside Attractions and Saban Films and released theatrically in the fall of 2018. The New York Times included Lizzie on its list of the Best Films of 2018. Macneill's first feature film, The Boy, premiered in the narrative competition at the 2015 SXSW Film Festival and which was also based on a previous short film he co-wrote, directed, and edited titled Henley, which screened in competition at the 2012 Sundance Film Festival and won the grand jury prize for "Best Short Film" at the Gen Art Film Festival and Clint Eastwood's Carmel Film and Arts Film Festival. In 2016.

On the television side, Macneill directed two episodes for HBO's Emmy winning series, Westworld, along with four episodes of Amazon Prime anthology series Them, including the Season 2 pilot for Them: The Scare, which holds a 100% approval rating on Rotten Tomatoes. Them was also nominated for an Independent Spirit Award. Macneill is currently developing an original series, titled Unknown, for Amazon Prime with Jonathan Nolan and Lisa Joy's Kilter Films producing. Macneill's other TV directorial work include episodes for AMC's The Terror, Jordan Peele's Twilight Zone, Alaska Daily, Castle Rock, NOS4A2, Monsterland, and the first season of Nick Antosca's limited anthology television series Channel Zero: Candle Cove.

== Early life and education ==
Macneill was born in New England, and moved to Northern Virginia where he attended high school. He graduated from the University of Colorado Boulder with a Bachelor of Fine Arts after having studied under filmmakers including Stan Brakhage.

== Career ==
=== Feature films ===
Macneill directed Lizzie, a psychological thriller starring Chloë Sevigny and Kristen Stewart. Lizzie premiered in the U.S Dramatic Competition section at the 2018 Sundance Film Festival.

Macneill directed and co-wrote the 2015 feature film The Boy, starring David Morse, Rainn Wilson, Jared Breeze, Mike Vogel, Bill Sage, Zuleikha Robinson, and Aiden Lovecamp. The film was produced by Elijah Wood, Daniel Noah, and Josh C. Waller and the company SpectreVision.

=== Television ===
Macneill directed two episodes for HBO's Westworld, four episodes for the Amazon Prime's Them, including the first season as well as the pilot and second episode of season two. He directed two episodes for season three of AMC's The Terror, an episode of Tom McCarthy's series Alaska Daily starring Hilary Swank, and an episode for Jordan Peele's The Twilight Zone anthology reboot television series, titled The Blue Scorpion, starring Chris O'Dowd. He also directed an episode of the horror drama series, Castle Rock, two episodes of the horror drama series, NOS4A2, one episode of the horror drama series, Monsterland, and two episodes for the Chilling Adventures of Sabrina. Macneill directed the first season of the limited anthology television series Channel Zero: Candle Cove. The show was created by Nick Antosca and stars Paul Schneider and Fiona Shaw.

=== Short films ===
Macneill has written, produced, edited, and directed a number of short films before The Boy. Among them is a 2011 short Henley, which won a "Best Short Film" award at the 2011 Gen Art Film Festival Film Festival and the 2012 Carmel Film and Arts Film Festival. Henley was one of 64 short films selected from 7,675 submissions to screen in competition at the 2012 Sundance Film Festival.

Among the short films that Macneill has both directed, produced, co-wrote, and edited include the award winning short film Late Bloomer, which screened as an official selection at the 2005 Sundance Film Festival. It won the audience award at the 2004 Lake Placid Film Festival, and was screened at film festivals worldwide

=== Experimental film ===
In 2009, Macneill, along with co-director Alexei Kaleina, completed an experimental film titled The Afterlight, which had its world premiere at the International Rome Film Festival and was acquired for limited theatrical distribution through Cinema Purgatorio. The film stars Michael Kelly, Ana Asensio, Jicky Schnee, and Rip Torn.

=== Virtual reality series ===
By October 2025, he signed on to direct I Let You In, a virtual reality 6-episode series based on the Talk to Me universe. The series is set to debut on Meta Platforms, in 2027.

== Personal life ==
Macneill lives in New York City, New York with his wife, director/actress Ana Asensio. He was the recipient of a 2009 Jerome Foundation Grant.
