= Heaven's Rain =

- Directed by: Paul Brown
- Written by: Brooks Douglass; Paul Brown
- Produced by: Paul Brown; Brooks Douglass; Bobby Downes; Christopher Morrow
- Starring: Mike Vogel; Erin Chambers; Taryn Manning; Marilyn McIntyre; Casey Sander; Silas Weir Mitchell; Brooks Douglass; Mollie Milligan
- Cinematography: Mac Ahlberg
- Edited by: Michael Darrow
- Music by: Scott Hosfeld
- Release date: September 9, 2010
- Country: United States
- Language: English

Heaven's Rain is a 2010 American biographical drama film based on the true story of the lifelong quest of Brooks Douglass to bring his parents' killers and his sister's rapists to justice. The film is directed by Paul Brown, and was written by Brown and Douglass. The film debuted at the ArcLight Cinemas in Hollywood on September 9, 2010.

The title is taken from words spoken by Portia in Shakespeare's The Merchant of Venice: The quality of mercy is not strain'd, It droppeth as the gentle rain from heaven

The film was re-released in 2018 under the title The Amendment.

== Plot ==
Following missionary work on the Amazon River in Brazil, Dr. Richard Douglass moved his family to the Oklahoma City area, becoming a well-respected Baptist minister to the large congregation of Putnam City Baptist Church. His wife Marilyn was an accomplished singer and loving mother. The couple had two children, Brooks (16) and Leslie (12). On October 15, 1979, two drifters, Glen Ake and Steven Hatch entered their home, and tied the parents and Brooks. The intruders took 12-year-old Leslie into the bedroom, where both men raped her. After tying up Leslie, they shot all four family members, killing the parents and leaving the two siblings for dead.

The film is a story of forgiveness as primarily viewed from the perspective of Brooks. Both Brooks and Leslie have endured through the horror of the crime, then dealing through the emotional consequences to eventually excel in their respective careers, he as a state legislator, businessman, producer and actor; she as a professional educator.

== Cast ==
- Mike Vogel as Brooks Douglass
- Erin Chambers as Nicole
- Taryn Manning as Leslie Douglass
- Marilyn McIntyre as Margaret
- Rebecca McCauley as Jackie
- Casey Sander as Captain Larsen
- Joshua Norman as Prison Guard
- Silas Weir Mitchell as Ake
- Brooks Douglass as Dr. Richard Douglass
- Kelly Curran as Marilyn Douglass
- Megan Paul as Heather
- Nicholas Braico as Child Brooks
- Taylor Pigeon as Child Leslie
- Mollie Milligan as Julie Mitchell

Leslie Douglass appears as a Night Club Singer performing "Shenandoah".

== Soundtrack ==
- "Original Score"

Composer and Conducted by Maria Newman

- "Shenandoah"

Words and Music in the Public Domain Worldwide Performed by Wendy Page Arranged by Charlton Pettus

- "His Eye Is On The Sparrow"

Words by Civilla D. Martin Music by Charles Hutchinson Gabriel Performed by Wendy Page Arranged by Charlton Pettus

- "Down To The River To Pray"

Words and Music in the Public Domain Worldwide Performed by Georgica Pettus Arranged by Charlton Pettus

- "Are We There"

Written by Lindsay Tomasic Performed by Lindsay Tomasic Published by Heavy Hitters

- "Lounging With Ease"

Written by Michael Mandel Performed by Mike Mandel Published by Mopsy Music

- "Shenandoah"

Words and Music in the Public Domain Worldwide Performed by Leslie Douglass Arranged by Charlton Pettus

- "Tell Me What's Happening"

Written by Gaby Moreno Performed by Gaby Moreno Under License from Town Records, LLC

- "Tracks Across The Sky"

Written by Todd Thibaud Performed by Todd Thibaud Published by Heavy Hitters

- "Love, Reign O'er Me"

Written by Pete Townshend Performed by The Who Courtesy of Geffen Records and Polydor Ltd. (U.K.) Under license from Universal Music Enterprises

- "Love, Reign O'er Me"

Written by Pete Townshend Performed by Taryn Manning Published by: Universal Music Careers on behalf of Towser Tunes, Inc., Abkco Music, Inc. and Fabulous Music Ltd

- "Love, Reign O'er Me"

Written by Pete Townshend Performed by Gaby Moreno Arranged by Charlton Pettus Published by: Universal Music Careers on behalf of Towser Tunes, Inc., Abkco Music, Inc. and Fabulous Music Ltd
