= Local 58 =

YouTube horror web series by Kris Straub

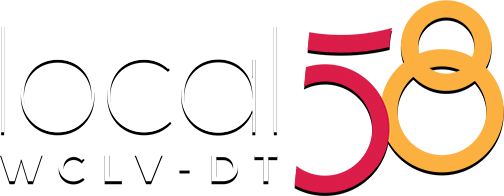
- Genre: Found footage; Analog horror; Psychological horror; Surrealism; Science fiction; Anthology
- Created by: Kris Straub
- Written by: Kris Straub
- Directed by: Kris Straub
- Country of origin: United States
- Original language: English
- No. of seasons: 3
- No. of episodes: 13

Production
- Animator: Kris Straub
- Editor: Kris Straub

Original release
- Network: YouTube
- Release: October 26, 2015 – present

Related
- Candle Cove

Local 58 is a horror web series created by American cartoonist Kris Straub. The series is a spin-off of Straub's Candle Cove creepypasta. Currently hosted on the YouTube channel LOCAL58TV, each video in the series is presented as footage of a fictional public access television channel located in Mason County, West Virginia, named Local 58, with the call sign WCLV-TV, created in the late 1930s, which is continuously hijacked over a period of decades with a series of ominous and surreal broadcasts.

The series makes use of video and audio degradation to add to the realism and unsettling nature of each video. The series describes itself as "analog horror", a term that has since been used as a name for a niche subgenre of similar VHS-themed found footage web series that were either inspired by Local 58 or use a similar style and techniques to the series. The full description the series gives itself is "Analog horror at 476 MHz." The series has since gained a cult following.

A website called local58.tv was created in September 2021 as an extension of the main storyline. The website features a "LookBack Web Archive" similar to the web archive service Wayback Machine, and features numerous Easter eggs and plot points for an associated alternate reality game that offers further detail on Local 58's continuity.

== Episodes ==
Local 58 consists of eight main episodes and eight miscellaneous episodes (as of November 2026). The episodes were originally published on a separate website. However, since the end of 2018, they have all been available on YouTube.

=== Season 1 ===
No.	Title	Directed by	Written by	Length	Original release date
1	"Weather Service"	Kris Straub	Kris Straub	2:33	October 26, 2015
A programming schedule broadcast at midnight is interrupted by an Emergency Alert System (EAS) message from the County Weather Service warning viewers of a meteorological event taking place, with the alert remaining in place until sunrise. It concludes the message by warning that citizens should not view the event with the naked eye. Normal programming briefly resumes with a second schedule before the broadcast is cut off by a second EAS broadcast, this time upgraded to a civil danger warning. The alert states that viewers should not look at the night sky. The station is then hijacked, with the hijacker claiming that the meteorological event is safe and that the warning has been lifted. They then directly demand viewers to go outside. A struggle to gain control over the station takes place between the broadcaster and the hijacker. The first party issues warnings to the viewers to not look at the Moon, while the second attempts to cut off or modify these messages. The broadcaster is successful in communicating advice relating to the threat. Local 58 momentarily returns to normal programming before a final EAS message under the control of the hijacker airs. The EAS presents cryptic information that details how the hijacker was brainwashed by the Moon. After the last message - "IF YOU ARE AFRAID, WE WILL LOOK TOGETHER" - the feed cuts to a live view of the Moon while distant sounds of people screaming are heard.
2	"Contingency"	Kris Straub	Kris Straub	3:06	January 16, 2016
Local 58 signs-off for the day and starts broadcasting SMPTE bars. The broadcast is then interrupted with an emergency alert from the fictional "Department for the Preservation of American Dignity" (DPAD) and a written message from President Lyndon B. Johnson set to "The Star-Spangled Banner". The message claims that the United States military been defeated by that of a foreign nation and that all Americans are "called upon to ACT" to "preserve the memory of the United States clear and bright… untarnished and uncompromised." After the message concludes, a distorted rendition of "My Country, 'Tis of Thee" plays as the broadcast continues. Informing viewers that local law enforcement are to "ensure your compliance" and that it is "against the law to delay". The broadcast recommends suicide by gunshot, stating that it will repeat "until there are none to read it". The DPAD also suggest, if time allows, the "Victory Position", a ritualistic posture where at least one person lays flat on their back on their front lawn before shooting themselves. After instructing viewers to euthanize their children and pets, referring to them as "the smallest patriots," then briefly flashing the statement that "THE 51ST STATE IS NOT A PLACE", the broadcast is halted. Local 58 airs a retraction claiming that the message was a hoax, and apologizes for the error. However, visible behind the message is a second slide instructing the station to claim the footage was a hoax in the event of an accidental broadcast, indicating that everything seen up to the hoax slide was a real contingency plan intended for use if such events were to ever take place.
3	"You Are on the Fastest Available Route"	Kris Straub	Kris Straub	3:38	June 19, 2016
A programming schedule shows the night's line-up, consisting of a midnight movie and paid programming, before the broadcast abruptly cuts to static and is replaced by footage from a dashcam recorded on 21 November 2014. Involving a driver following a GPS satnav. The drive mostly consists of the GPS's directions as it informs the driver that they are "on the fastest available route." After a while, the footage skips forward to the driver driving through the middle of a forest on an unpaved road, with the GPS's directions having become increasingly questionable. Instructing the driver to follow the no entry signs, to continue on an "unnamed road", and to park the car and turn off the headlights. Having followed every direction without fail, the driver complies, bringing the car to a complete stop with its lights turned off. After waiting in darkness, a loud roar can be heard. The driver quickly turns the headlights back on to reveal a bipedal creature ahead on the road. The feed cuts to the person driving away from the creature, with the GPS repeatedly telling the driver to turn around, as the "destination" is behind them. The GPS rapidly counts down the distance in feet as the roars become louder, revealing the creature to be the destination itself. The feed cuts forward again to the car lying sideways with the windshield cracked. One last roar is heard as the feed glitches out. With the GPS finally announcing in a slow, distorted tone that the driver has arrived at their destination.

=== Season 2 ===
No.	Title	Directed by	Written by	Length	Original release date
4	"Show for Children"	Kris Straub	Kris Straub	3:11	July 30, 2018
A programming schedule lists early morning broadcasts. A bumper saying "Local 58 Show for Children" appears, featuring a cartoon clown statue in an amusement park. A rubber hose animation cartoon titled "A Grave Mistake" begins, which features an anthropomorphic skeleton named Cadavre. The cartoon opens with Cadavre walking through a graveyard at night with the Moon smiling overhead. He comes across an open grave and wonders if his lover may be inside. Peeking into the grave, Cadavre finds a realistic-looking corpse, which frightens Cadavre and causes him to run away. He finds another grave and decides to look inside, only to be frightened again by a strange bird-like creature. As the soundtrack completely cuts out, Cadavre, now visibly tense, continues through the graveyard while the Moon stares down at him. He looks into another grave and descends into it, entering a cave. After wandering through the cave for some time, he reaches another open grave. Exhausted and unable to climb out, Cadavre lies face up on the ground. From his perspective, a giant, realistic rendering of the Moon can be seen moving over the grave. The view turns back to Cadavre, who has seemingly died and turned into a lifeless, realistic-looking skeleton. The programming ends with the cartoon clown bumper, now with its mouth further outstretched.
5	"Real Sleep"	Kris Straub	Kris Straub	5:10	December 19, 2018
A personalized VHS recording made by the Thought Research Initiative (TRI) is broadcast. The recording starts with a "myth or fact" game about sleeping, claiming that dreaming is not essential to mental health. It then displays a visual of monitored brainwaves called the "Kleitman Map," implying that the video was personally designed to prevent dreams by applying an inverse of the map. The video then cuts to a segment where four sequences are introduced in a manner similar to the flashed face distortion effect. Sequence one tells the viewer to look directly at the center of the screen as faces flash at the viewer. Sequence two has red and green colored faces slowly merge. Sequence three instructs the viewer to repeat the phrase "there are no faces" several times as distorted and grotesque faces flash on the screen. Sequence four flashes a number of ominous subliminal messages, while "there are no faces" repeats a final time, slowed down. The video concludes with the viewer being told that they have now completed the Real Sleep program, and to avoid seeing a doctor if they experience any problems.
6	"Skywatching"	Kris Straub	Kris Straub	4:15	October 31, 2019
Following a broadcast schedule, an episode of Skywatching begins, but is replaced by amateur footage of a man recording the night sky through his camera. The man aims the camera at Orion's Belt and the Pleiades, then after changing his camera's lens, begins filming the Moon, referred to as "HIS THRONE" by onscreen text. The cameraman then shows close ups of the Moon's surface with moving clouds, organic formations, and artificial structures. Including buildings constructed inside a crater and a giant arrow carved into the lunar regolith. The Moon then fades away. As the cameraman changes the lens again, a loud noise can be heard as the Moon reappears, now far larger in size. A Federal Signal Thunderbolt tornado siren begins to sound, and the cameraman adjusts the brightness of the camera pointing at the Moon, showing its southern hemisphere cracked open and revealing the body of a gigantic skeletal organism inside. The cameraman places the camera down and walks towards the Moon with his hands raised as the siren abruptly stops. Onscreen text reads "REJOICE" as the footage ends.

=== Season 3 ===
No.	Title	Directed by	Written by	Length	Original release date
7	"Night Walk"	Kris Straub	Kris Straub	3:14	October 31, 2024
Local 58 airs a 1977 documentary titled Night Walk, detailing supernatural sightings in Mason County, West Virginia. The film introduces the urban legend of "The Woman in Profile", a shadowy figure described by observers as resembling a woman in profile view staring intently into the sky, who disappears when approached. It further states that there have been over two dozen sightings, all occurring around twilight, and that the Ichor Falls police department sought the Woman as a potential witness to the murder of a student at the local university. The broadcast then cuts to a video recording of the Woman, dated from 1996, in which a brief flash of light reveals the Woman to be a creature with two faces and a conjoined, multi-limbed body. The cameraman attempts to talk to the Woman, only for its eyes to begin glowing as the man lowers his camera and moves away. The footage ends on a freeze frame of the fully illuminated Woman with its eyes glowing, as on-screen text reads "A PREDATOR CANNOT DIFFERENTIATE BETWEEN PREY AND ACCOMPLICE / SAFETY IN NUMBERS".
8	"Ad Spot"	Kris Straub	Kris Straub	3:53	April 22, 2026
The Thought Research Initiative (introduced in "Real Sleep") airs a commercial disparaging generative AI, and pitching their product 'Qualiaform Intuition', or QI, as an alternative. The broadcast then cuts to footage of a CRT monitor display belonging to the Initiative, which displays an operating system developed between 1983 and 1984 called 'CBRM-OS'. The operating system loads a QI module into a "cerebrant environment", producing an ASCII rendering of a face voiced by text-to-speech. The user types "Describe where you are", causing the module to panic, hyperventilate, scream and crash as the message "RUNAWAY" displays repeatedly, forcing the user to terminate it. Reloading the module with different parameters, the user again asks it to describe its surroundings, but it replies "I CAN'T", saying it is "AFRAID" and "COLD". The user then codes a 'narrative' into the module, causing it to believe that it is an angel in Heaven, helping others after having lived a virtuous life, though it also remarks that it is afraid of God. The QI module then asks if the user is God; the user starts to code in another 'narrative', but reconsiders and instead replies affirmatively. The module's face begins to distort, before the display cuts out. NOTE: This episode was first released in two separate halves. The first portion was published to the Thought Research Initiative YouTube channel as "TV Ad (2026)" on 4 April 2026. The second section was released as "TRI a (1983)" as an unlisted video on the LOCAL58TV YouTube channel on 22 April 2026.

=== Miscellaneous ===
No.	Title	Directed by	Written by	Length	Original release date
TBA	"Station ID"	Kris Straub	Kris Straub	0:18	November 2, 2017
Serving as the channel's trailer, the video consists of a series of cryptic messages, which read the following: ANALOG HORROR AT 476 MHz WE BEGIN OUR BROADCAST DAY LOOK AWAY IT DOES NOT MATTER THERE ARE OTHER RECEIVERS SAFETY IN NUMBERS
TBA	"A Look Back"	Kris Straub	Kris Straub	1:03	August 27, 2018
A compilation of the history of Local 58, shuffling through the channel's various past logos in chronological order, gets hijacked, and messages begin to flash on the screen similar to those shown in "Station ID". The broadcast then becomes a montage of short clips from previous episodes of the series, intercut with glitched footage of normal television broadcasts. After a few more messages are shown, the station's broadcasting returns to normal.
TBA	"Digital Transition"	Kris Straub	Kris Straub	3:54	October 31, 2021
On July 13, 2021, Local 58 is preparing to undergo a digital switchover at midnight. Following the conclusion of a normal airing of an episode of One Step Beyond, the channel airs a tribute bumper depicting numerous eras of the station’s 82-year history (1939–present) and its broadcasts. The end of the bumper shows Local 58's new logo, with an extended tagline "Community Digital Television." The switchover takes place, but as the clock passes midnight, the broadcast becomes corrupted, and the analog signal persists, visible behind that of the digital signal output, insisting that the digital switchover has been postponed. A poem entitled "BETRAYAL" appears behind the digital signal notice, followed by an Emergency Alert System message (as seen in "Weather Service"). Another set of cryptic messages is clearly displayed. The intruder writes about speaking on behalf of another being, and that there are "no stars above... only eyes waiting to open". A distorted face appears and deteriorates and is replaced with a legal warning from the FBI, DHS, HHS and the FCG (a fictional version of the FCC) about "unauthorized analog reception".
TBA	"CLOSE"	Kris Straub	Kris Straub	29:43	October 31, 2022
A special presentation featuring a livestream from the C.L.O.S.E. Mission (Cometary Lander Orbiter Survey Expedition) conducted by SARO (Space & Aeronautics Regulatory Oversight), a fictionalized version of NASA, begins with footage from a space probe approaching the rapidly-rotating asteroid 57838 Eidolon (1P/2006 Telesky), approximately 25 minutes away from landing. The object is nicknamed the "Face in Space" and "Comet Skull" due to its resemblance to a skull in instances of its rotation. As the satellite approaches the comet, the video and audio become increasingly distorted, but the asteroid's facial resemblance decreases, confirming the supposition that shadows caused the illusion. As the lander approaches Eidolon's largest crater, a structure resembling a door becomes visible. When it is within seconds of touchdown, otherworldly noises can be heard, and the lander loses connection with mission control shortly after it lands. After a few moments of a black screen, seemingly-recovered footage from the lander's cameras is shown. The lander observes Eidolon's door, which opens, revealing an unusual texture on the walls of the comet's interior. The footage then ends as an unseen force ejects the lander off Eidolon at great speed.
TBA	"NSSA-3 (atypical)"	Kris Straub	Kris Straub	0:58	November 1, 2024
Heavy and colorful static is accompanied by a loud, unintelligible voice. Glimpses of a red face are seen. The former Local 58 logo is obscured within the static. The distorted face appears again followed by illegible text.
TBA	"LOCATOR 628-M-42R"	Kris Straub	Kris Straub	0:41	January 21, 2026
Presented in the Youtube Shorts format. A video from the US Department of the Preservation of American Dignity (seen on "Contingency") labeled "LOCATOR 628-M-42R" is played. The footage consists of a unidentified person with a camera recording a dark woodland area. The camera operator discovers a monster with a TV for a head and screens melded to its body.
TBA	"1793420242"	Kris Straub	Kris Straub	0:09	October 29, 2026
The previous Local 58 logo is displayed alongside the station's theme music. The logo is heavily obscured by static. A line of numbers reading "1793420242" appears. The text string becomes illegible and a loud tone is heard.
TBA	"Red Eye"	Kris Straub	Kris Straub	7:41	November 1, 2026
A passenger on board a red-eye AeroLux Airlines Flight AX113 from LAX to Melbourne Airport interacts with their in-flight entertainment system. The passenger has access to view a "Tail Cam" that shows a live camera feed of the exterior of the plane. The passenger selects this option and watches the plane take off from the runway and reach altitude. The passenger exits the Tail Cam and selects the options "Watch" and "Listen"; both are unavailable so the passenger continues to watch the Tail Cam. The plane approaches a heavy thunderstorm and experiences turbulence. Frightened passengers scream as the pilot instructs over intercom to fasten seatbelts. The sky darkens as lightning strikes. The pilot describes the turbulence as "moderate" and will attempt to manoeuvre the plane above the storm. The screaming from the passengers distorts with the sound of the jet engine and the thunderstorm; the thick clouds become brighter. An object, similar in appearance to a thin human hand, descends from above the plane. The feed from the Tail Cam momentarily cuts out. When the camera is operational again, it shows the plane outside of Earth's atmosphere and headed directly for the Moon. The Tail Cam cuts out again before showing the wreckage of the plane upon the surface of the Moon.

=== Shudder exclusives ===
Starting in October 2026. Short exclusive episodes have been aired on the streaming service Shudder through their live channel.

No.	Title	Directed by	Written by	Length	Original release date
TBA	"Breaking News"	Kris Straub	Kris Straub	2:14	October 24, 2026
A broadcast of Local 58's own News at Nine begins. The camera moves around the newsroom, however, the studio is completely empty and appears hastily abandoned. The camera focuses on the places where news presenters should be stationed and their names are displayed on screen. Despite the absence of people, the program continues to operate routinely. During the Sports segment of News at Nine, footage of a football match is accidentally chroma keyed against the dark red portions of the set. Revealing a handprint on the wall and stains on the desk; implied to be blood. In the Weather segment, the overlay reveals dark red streaks along the green screen and pools of blood on the floor. The cameras and studio lights break as blood moves vertically upwards upon the back wall of the newsroom. The dark red color of the blood causes a card that reads "Technical Difficulties" to be improperly displayed. The footage cuts out before a clear version of the "Technical Difficulties" card is shown, as well as a second card that reads "We'll be right back". NOTE: This episode was broadcast during The Last Drive-in with Joe Bob Briggs Halloween special.
TBA	"Blood of the Living Dawn (1973)"	Kris Straub	Kris Straub	3:50	October 31, 2026
A 1970s film titled Blood of the Living Dawn (As seen in "Weather Service") is broadcast live through a streaming service. The plot summary for the film reads "A group of parents and their children encounter a strange entity during a ski lodge retreat.", but changes throughout the stream. Footage from Blood of the Living Dawn is taken from the 1974 film People Toys. The broadcast is buffering and suffering from poor image quality. The film begins with a sequence of a woman walking down a staircase intertwined with a shot of a hallway and a door opening. Problems with the image and sound occur, causing the woman's face to appear featureless. A scene with the woman and two others (a man and a second woman) ends with the first woman vanishing and a freeze frame on the second woman's distorted face. The stream picks up again at a scene where a woman ask a girl about her parents. The girl states she "doesn't have any". A third voice says "Our mothers are watching us" before the broadcast struggles again. The film abruptly cuts to a scene of two men conversing in cryptic phrases. One of the men runs outside and shouts incoherently. He opens a door to see an elongated, black hand reaching from the ground. The man flees but the hand has disappeared. Credits consisting of seemingly gibberish scroll across the screen before the stream crashes and displays an error code stating that "the requested media does not exist."
TBA	"In-Room Guide"	Kris Straub	Kris Straub	2:39	November 7, 2026
A guest in Room 112 at the Maple Grove Hotel watches their rooms' hotel television system. The channel airs it's programming schedule and their "Hospitality and Events Guide", which describes a "special event" set to take place from 3 AM to 5 AM. The special event begins and the television system broadcasts footage from a guests' room where they see a dark humanoid figure standing in the doorway. The footage switches to another room where a guest is sleeping in bed. Disturbing messages in the programming schedule counts down the number of guests. The television system announces that an "elite member" is the guest in Room 112, and advises to hide.
TBA	"Ritual"	Kris Straub	Kris Straub	2:56	November 13, 2026
An old Turkish-language film is broadcast with English subtitles. Scenes of the film are taken from the Spanish horror movie Assignment: Terror with the dubbed audio taken from the 2015 film Naciye. The scenes follow a detective investigating evidence with another man in relation to a mysterious serial killer. The detective goes to a library to question a woman about a potential suspect and a "unique book" that the suspect was after. Elements of the subtitles glitch and corrode, and a circular formation appears on the screen, which is defined by red-colored characters lifted from the subtitles. When the circle is filled; pixelated representations of humans bow to the circle. Footage then displays the facial features of a monstrous being with glowing eyes. The film ends with the detective discovering a dead body at the top of a staircase in the library.
TBA	"Public Heath"	Kris Straub	Kris Straub	3:09	November 20, 2026
A program with a female host is interrupted by an Emergency Warning System and signals to pay attention to further instructions. An infectious disease warning announces the outbreak of Erythridans cryptocytogenes in the area and that symptoms include dizziness, tinnitus, hallucinations and aphasia. Instructions from the U.S. Commission on Public Health, Safety & Conduct are given on how to treat Erythridans cryptocytogenes if infected. Steps involve sterilizing water, checking for lumps under the jaw, and applying a cloth to the skin. However, the wording for the instructions turns to incomprehensible gibberish, and the human illustration being used to demonstrate the instructions succumbs to the infection. A final message reading "Medlcal attenticn ls no lcnger necsssary [sic]" is stated before the program resumes. A large meteorite-like object is seen in a field and the face of the female host grotesquely deteriorates and distorts.

== Development and themes ==
The former Local58 logo

Straub released Local 58's first episode, "Weather Service", in 2015 as an experimental standalone piece for his co-owned YouTube channel Chainsawsuit Original. The piece received positive feedback, leading Straub to do two more on the same channel: "Contingency" and "You Are On the Fastest Route". The series was also hosted on the now-defunct web domain local58.info in 2015 and was later uploaded onto its own YouTube channel in 2017.

Straub used iMovie to create the first two episodes of Local 58 and Final Cut Pro X for the other episodes. All of the assets used in the series either come from public domain stock media (for example, the "2000s" Local 58 music, a stock track called "Entering Graciously") or created by Straub himself using Clip Studio, Adobe Photoshop and Adobe Flash.

Straub has confirmed on Reddit that Local 58 is the same "Channel 58" referred to in his creepypasta Candle Cove, which took the form of an Internet forum thread about a bizarre children's program of the same name airing on the network. The call sign WCLV is a reference to Candle Cove ("CLV = CandLe coVe"). Themes from other pieces of Straub's work appear in Local 58, such as the animated skeleton Cadavre, who appeared initially in Straub's webcomic Broodhollow and then in the Local 58 episode "Show for Children."

While the series does not appear to have a continuous plot, nearly every episode seems to include cryptic references related to gazing or staring at the Moon or at the night sky. Straub has identified themes of the series as "stillness, distrust of safety warnings, misuse of mass perception, parallel science that arises from unexamined bad intent, dogmatic thought."

== Reception ==
Since its initial debut, Local 58 has inspired the creation of other series with similar themes, including Analog Archive, Archive 81, Channel 7, Eventide Media Center, Gemini Home Entertainment, and The Mandela Catalogue. There is some difference of opinion about whether it was truly the first within its genre or an early example of a style that was already developing. However, critics agree the series categorically defined the conventions of the genre that would carry forward. Some also speculate it has indirectly influenced feature-length films such as Broadcast Signal Intrusion (2021), Skinamarink (2022), Backrooms (2026), and Buddy (2026), which rely heavily on analog aesthetics.

As of October 2026, the Local 58 YouTube channel has over 678,000 subscribers and over 31 million views.

A subreddit dedicated to the series was created on August 8, 2016, which as of December 2022 has 25,400 followers. Straub himself has answered some questions about the series on the subreddit.

The emergency alert shown in "Contingency" has been compared to the 2018 Hawaii false missile alert.

== Controversy ==
On July 4, 2022, YouTube marked one Local 58 episode, "Show for Children", as "for kids", which disables user comments to comply with the Children's Online Privacy Protection Act. After Straub appealed YouTube's decision via in-site and other social media support avenues, it was reverted to its original settings on July 6. This sparked renewed discussions about Elsagate and concerns regarding YouTube's moderation algorithms.

== See also ==
- The Blair Witch Project
- Gemini Home Entertainment
- Marble Hornets
- The Mandela Catalogue
- List of creepypastas
