= Channel Zero (TV series) =

American anthology horror TV series

- Genre: Anthology; Horror; Supernatural; Drama
- Created by: Nick Antosca
- Based on: Season 1: "Candle Cove" by Kris Straub Season 2; "The No-End House" by Brian Russell Season 3; "Search and Rescue Woods" by Kerry Hammond Season 4; "Hidden Door" by Charlotte Bywater
- Directed by: Season 1: Craig William Macneill Season 2; Steven Piet Season 3; Arkasha Stevenson Season 4; E. L. Katz
- Starring: Paul Schneider; Fiona Shaw; Luisa D'Oliveira; Natalie Brown; Shaun Benson; Luca Villacis; Abigail Pniowsky; Marina Stephenson Kerr; Amy Forsyth; Aisha Dee; Jeff Ward; Seamus Patterson; Sebastian Pigott; Jess Salgueiro; Melanie Nicholls-King; John Carroll Lynch; Rutger Hauer; Holland Roden; Olivia Luccardi; Krisha Fairchild; Brandon Scott; Maria Sten; Steven Robertson; Barbara Crampton; Gregg Henry; Greg Bryk; Troy James; Diana Bentley; Steven Weber
- Composer: Jeff Russo
- Country of origin: United States
- Original language: English
- No. of seasons: 4
- No. of episodes: 24

Production
- Executive producers: Nick Antosca; Harley Peyton (seasons 3–4); Max Landis (season 1–2)
- Producer: Jan Peter Meyboom
- Production location: Manitoba, Canada
- Camera setup: Single-camera
- Running time: 41–44 minutes
- Production companies: Eat the Cat; UTMK Limited (season 1–2); Universal Cable Productions

Original release
- Network: Syfy
- Release: October 11, 2016 – October 31, 2018

Channel Zero is an American horror anthology television series created by Nick Antosca, who served as writer, showrunner, and executive producer. The series was greenlit for two 6-episode, self-contained seasons, which aired in late 2016 and late 2017 on Syfy. The storylines for the series are based on popular creepypastas. On February 9, 2017, Syfy renewed the series for a third and fourth season.

The series premiered on October 11, 2016. The first installment, based on Kris Straub's Candle Cove, stars Paul Schneider and Fiona Shaw and was directed by Craig William Macneill. It centers on Straub's story of one man's obsessive recollection of a mysterious children's television program from the 1980s. The second season premiered on September 20, 2017, is based on Brian Russell's The No-End House and was directed by Steven Piet.

The third season, Butcher's Block, premiered on February 7, 2018, is based on Kerry Hammond's "Search and Rescue Woods" and was directed by Arkasha Stevenson. The fourth season, The Dream Door, was broadcast between October 26 and 31, 2018, is based on Charlotte Bywater's "Hidden Door" and was directed by E. L. Katz. On January 16, 2019, Syfy cancelled Channel Zero after four seasons.

== Series overview ==
Season	Title	Episodes	Originally released	
Season	Title	Episodes	First released	Last released
1	Candle Cove	6	October 11, 2016	November 15, 2016
2	No-End House	6	September 20, 2017	October 25, 2017
3	Butcher's Block	6	February 7, 2018	March 14, 2018
4	The Dream Door	6	October 26, 2018	October 31, 2018

== Plot ==
Season 1: Candle Cove

A child psychologist returns to his hometown to determine whether his brother's disappearance is somehow connected to a series of similar incidents and to a bizarre children's television series that aired at the same time.

Season 2: No-End House

A young woman and her group of friends visit a house of horrors only to find themselves questioning whether it is a tourist attraction or something more sinister.

Season 3: Butcher's Block

A young woman and her schizophrenic sister move to a city haunted by a series of disappearances and, after suspecting that they may be connected to a baffling rumor, they must work together to discover what is preying on the city's residents.

Season 4: The Dream Door

Newlyweds Jillian and Tom have each brought secrets into their marriage. When they discover a door in their basement, those secrets start to threaten their relationship — and their lives.

== Cast and characters ==
List indicators
- A green cell indicates the actor as a main cast member.
- A red cell indicates the actor as a recurring or a guest cast member.
- A grey cell indicates the actor has not participated in the respective season.

Actor	Capacity and character per season			
Actor	Candle Cove	No-End House	Butcher's Block	The Dream Door
Paul Schneider	Mike Painter			
Fiona Shaw	Marla Painter			
Luisa D'Oliveira	Amy Welch			
Natalie Brown	Jessica Yolen			
Shaun Benson	Gary Yolen			
Luca Villacis	Eddie Painter / Young Mike Painter			
Abigail Pniowsky	Lily Painter	Young Margot Sleator		
Marina Stephenson Kerr	Frances Booth			Detective Fraser
Amy Forsyth		Margot Sleator		
Aisha Dee		Jules Koja		
Jeff Ward		Seth Marlow		
Seamus Patterson		J.D. Shields		
Sebastian Pigott		Dylan Evans		
Jess Salgueiro		Lacy Evans		
Melanie Nicholls-King		Brenna Koja		
John Carroll Lynch		John Sleator		
Rutger Hauer			Joseph Peach	
Holland Roden			Zoe Woods	
Olivia Luccardi			Alice Woods	
Krisha Fairchild			Louise Lispector	
Brandon Scott			Luke Vanczyk	Tom Hodgson
Maria Sten				Jillian Hope Hodgson
Steven Robertson				Ian
Barbara Crampton				Vanessa Moss
Gregg Henry				Bill Hope
Greg Bryk				Detective McPhillips
Troy James			Scuttling Father Time	Pretzel Jack
Diana Bentley			Edie Peach	Sarah Winters
Steven Weber				Abel Carnacki

== Episodes ==
=== Season 1: Candle Cove (2016) ===
No. overall	No. in season	Title	Directed by	Written by	Original release date	US viewers (millions)
1	1	"You Have to Go Inside"	Craig William Macneill	Nick Antosca	October 11, 2016	0.76
Child psychologist Mike Painter returns to his home town of Iron Hill, Ohio nearly thirty years after a killer murdered five local children, among them his twin brother, Eddie. Eddie's body was never found. His mother, Marla, is the only family member remaining in the area. Painter reconnects with friends Jessica and Gary (who is now a sheriff). Over dinner, Mike mentions Candle Cove, a children's television series involving puppet pirates that they watched around the time of the murders, until it mysteriously went off the air. Katie, Jessica and Gary's daughter, says that she has seen the show recently. The next day, Katie goes missing, and Mike is under suspicion. Through Katie's brother, Dane, Mike realizes where he can find her. Mike follows a figure dressed as a skeleton who resembles one of the show's characters. He discovers Katie alive in the woods where the murders took place. He carries Katie back to her family, unaware that she has left two of her teeth behind to be claimed by a creature whose skin is made up of teeth. Marla reveals that when Mike and Eddie were watching Candle Cove as children, they were actually watching static on the television.
2	2	"I'll Hold Your Hand"	Craig William Macneill	Don Mancini & Nick Antosca	October 18, 2016	0.63
Gary and Jessica are awoken by their son's screams after Katie stabs him with a hook. Although Gary does not completely trust Mike, he allows him to talk to Katie at the hospital alone in order to discover what happened. Meanwhile, Marla visits a television station to ask about Candle Cove. The technician remembers the program and shows Marla a fan-made recreation. But he tells her that no tapes of the original show exist, as it was impossible to record. Mike finds more links to the Candle Cove imagery in Katie's drawing and uses it as a clue to visit an abandoned cement factory with his mother. Mike follows a mysterious figure into the factory alone and discovers the decomposed remains of his brother, Eddie. That night, Mike confesses to Marla that he killed Eddie as a child and buried his body, but that the corpse had been moved before the police dug up the grave site. Upset, Marla stabs Mike in the arm. The next day Gary comes to the house and asks Mike to come with him to the police station for questioning. However, along the way Mike realizes that Gary is taking him somewhere else.
3	3	"Want to See Something Cool?"	Craig William Macneill	Harley Peyton	October 25, 2016	0.55
Gary takes Mike to an empty house he had wanted to buy and handcuffs him in a chair. Tim and Daphne enter the house where they all interrogate Mike about the murders of their family members, believing him responsible. Flashbacks reveal that Candle Cove inspired Eddie to kill Tim's bully brother, Gene, using psychic mind-control to make him walk off the edge of a cliff. Eddie continued vengefully killing other children in a similar way before Mike stopped him by stabbing him with a hook. In present day, the others doubt Mike's story and Tim shoots him in the shoulder in a struggle for the truth. Marla, Jessica, and deputy Amy arrive as Tim and Daphne flee. Seeing Mike's condition, Amy takes Gary into custody. Later, Daphne visits Mrs. Booth, her former teacher, who also lost a son in the murders. After explaining what happened with Mike at the house, Booth murders Daphne with an ice hook and returns to host a group of children watching Candle Cove on her television. It is revealed that the kids killed Tim when he was walking home as Booth buries the body. Mike's daughter, Lily, arrives alone at Marla's house, even though she lives miles away.
4	4	"A Strange Vessel"	Craig William Macneill	Erica Saleh & Nick Antosca	November 1, 2016	0.47
Lily reveals herself to be a manifestation of Eddie and promises to send Mike "where he belongs". Fulfilling Eddie's wish, Mike breaks into the morgue with the help of Jessica and burns Eddie's skeletal remains. Jessica and Mike are shown to have been childhood sweethearts when they were young. Acting Sheriff Amy investigates the strange behavior of some kids and after a confusing encounter with Mrs. Booth at school, she finds the children playing pirate in the gymnasium. Acting on a hunch, she searches Booth's home and finds Candle Cove props in her basement, eventually coming across Daphne's body. Meanwhile, Jessica returns home to discover several children masked in Candle Cove costumes who suddenly start stabbing her. She collapses, bleeding as Booth stands in the background. Lily regains consciousness as herself.
5	5	"Guest of Honor"	Craig William Macneill	Katie Gruel & Mallory Westfall	November 8, 2016	0.44
Mike discovers an extra tooth breaking through his gum, a trait that only Eddie had as a child. Amy tells Mike about Jessica's murder and she agrees to let Gary out of custody to help him search Mrs. Booth's property. Gary discovers some teeth left on a fence post outside and Mike realizes that the Candle Cove props were fake. He receives a phone call from Booth, who instructs him to meet her alone at an abandoned diner. He goes there and witnesses Booth in the skeleton costume, controlling children into helping her commit murder. Later, she goes to Marla's house and she tells Mike and Marla how Eddie used his powers to control her seizures. It was also Eddie who created Candle Cove, not her. Booth killed her own son as a sacrifice for Eddie, in order to increase his power, and welcomes Eddie's return through Mike. That night at a motel, the tooth creature lures Lily away. As Mike attempts to extract his extra tooth, Candle Cove begins playing on the television, featuring a frightened Lily.
6	6	"Welcome Home"	Craig William Macneill	Nick Antosca & Harley Peyton & Don Mancini	November 15, 2016	0.42
Amy and Gary search for the children suspects and Gary is able to reclaim his own children from Candle Cove's control. Mike's wife, Erica, demands to know where Lily is, but he insists that he is the only one who can save her. He takes Erica to the site of the murders and loses consciousness, entering Eddie's parallel world, which is filled with strange rooms and monsters. When he finally comes face to face with his brother, Eddie allows Lily to leave if Mike will stay forever. Lily returns to reality by crawling through a TV and is greeted by her mother. Marla goes to the woods where she is attacked by Mrs. Booth. Marla is rescued at the last minute by Amy, who shoots Booth before Marla finally stabs her skull with the hook. Mike convinces Eddie to stay for one more card game they played as kids, delaying him long enough for Marla to return to the woods and suffocate Mike's body before Eddie can possess it. Unable to break free of his world, Eddie is forced to remain with Mike.

=== Season 2: No-End House (2017) ===
No. overall	No. in season	Title	Directed by	Written by	Original release date	US viewers (millions)
7	1	"This Isn't Real"	Steven Piet	Nick Antosca	September 20, 2017	0.39
Teenagers Margot and Jules overhear about the No-End House, a haunted house attraction which shows up seemingly out of nowhere, going from town to town. That night, Margot, Jules, and their friends J.D and Seth seek out the No-End House and enter, where they experience several surreal experiences inside various rooms, including the cracking of identical molds of their own faces except for the one resembling J.D. After being separated from the group, Margot has a strange experience with a masked man and a vision of her dead father John, who died of an allergic reaction to his medication and whose death Margot blames herself for. Margot gets out of the house and reconvenes with Jules; they assume J.D and Seth are still inside the house and go home. At home, Margot hears her father’s whistling from the kitchen.
8	2	"Nice Neighborhood"	Steven Piet	Harley Peyton & Mallory Westfall	September 27, 2017	0.38
The following morning, Jules shows up at Margot’s house to find her eating breakfast with John, who doesn’t remember being dead. Seth and J.D exit the house and go to look for the girls, but discover that they have slipped into an alternate reality; while Seth finds Jules eventually, in his home, J.D encounters a copy of himself. Jules hypothesizes that they are still in the house’s final room, and that John is a manifestation of the house. J.D’s duplicate tells him that the house created him out of J.D’s memories; although the conversation is initially positive, the double bludgeons the real J.D to death with a whiskey bottle. Elsewhere, another man who entered the No-End House walks through the streets and encounters a woman previously seen trying to escape the dreamworld, killing her after realizing she's a duplicate of his missing wife Lacey. He eventually finds his real wife but she does not recognize him - it is revealed the two previously entered the No-End House together but only he made it out. At night, John feeds on Margot’s memories and accidentally creates a duplicate of his wife, Corrine, who he proceeds to eat.
9	3	"Beware the Cannibals"	Steven Piet	Don Mancini & Erica Saleh	October 4, 2017	0.41
J.D’s duplicate burns J.D’s corpse and meets up with Seth and Jules. Meanwhile, Lacey's husband Dylan resorts to holding her in captivity when she insists she is married to someone else - he eventually kills the supposed husband when he comes home. Margot, conflicted with the fact that her father’s original death was a suicide, discovers Corrine’s face in the trash and locks herself in her room to hide from John. Seth, Jules, and fake J.D search for the No-End House and witness Margot, who managed to escape her home, trying to get help from a neighbor only for John to kill him with a garden hose. Margot, Jules, fake J.D and Seth manage to outrun the father and meet Dylan, who tells them they must escape the No-End House before the dreamworld makes them forget their loved ones and real lives. The fake J.D’s skin begins to fall off.
10	4	"The Exit"	Steven Piet	Nick Antosca & Katie Gruel	October 11, 2017	0.48
Dylan remains unsuccessful in helping Lacey remember their real life together. Trying to make their way to the house, which they see at the edge of the dreamworld, the group must stop for the night when they come upon a corn maze inhabited by ravenous duplicates. While stopped, Seth reveals to Margot that he has been living in the dreamworld all along and - after spending the previous night together - wants her to stay with him too. Meanwhile, a captive Lacey is killed when one of the duplicates emerges from the maze; a grief-stricken Dylan sees the peeling skin on fake J.D’s arm and kills him, revealing the real J.D is already dead. The group loses each other in the maze and while saving Jules, Margot encounters John who is dying due to a withdrawal from Margot’s memories, though he allows her and Jules to escape. The two enter the No-End House together while Dylan stays behind, intending to burn it to the ground, though he is brutally killed by John before he can. Margot and Jules successfully exit the No-End House but, unbeknownst to them, are followed by John into the real world.
11	5	"The Damage"	Steven Piet	Harley Peyton & Lisa Long	October 18, 2017	0.41
Margot makes her way back home where she asks Corrine about her father’s suicide; Corrine reveals that he killed himself in order to financially support the two of them. At night, John sneaks into her house and begins to feed on her memories but is knocked out by Seth, revealed to have exited the house as well. They discuss what to do with him and allow him to birth and eat a dog from Margot’s memories in order to survive; however, Seth reveals that he put the medication the original John killed himself with in the dog, seemingly poisoning him. However, when Corrine comes home, John turns out to be alive and attacks her and Margot. Seth intervenes and is nearly killed by John; to save him, Margot allows John to take her and Seth back inside the No-End House.
12	6	"The Hollow Girl"	Steven Piet	Nick Antosca & Angel Varak-Iglar	October 25, 2017	0.37
One year later, Seth, Margo, and John live inside one of the No-End House's parallel universes; Margot allows John to occasionally feed on her memories. Meanwhile, Jules locates the next place the house will appear; after entering it, she is knocked unconscious by Seth who leaves her to be consumed by the house. Jules survives and finds Margot, showing her six other women of a similar age who Seth allowed the house to drain, something he intends to do to Margot as well. After confronting Seth, Margot releases the house's manifestations of his family, who he kept locked away starving for years; they proceed to feed on his memories until nothing is left. Jules confronts John, who says that he is fine with dying if it allows Margot to be free; Margot ties a heavy plant pot to him and reluctantly stabs him, allowing him to fall into a bottomless pool in the No-End House. Margot and Jules exit the house together.

=== Season 3: Butcher's Block (2018) ===
No. overall	No. in season	Title	Directed by	Written by	Original release date	US viewers (millions)
13	1	"Insidious Onset"	Arkasha Stevenson	Nick Antosca	February 7, 2018	0.38
Alice and her schizophrenic sister Zoe have moved to a new city, where Alice is employed as a social worker. They learn about Peach's Meats, a now closed business run by the Peach family, and a nearby park where Zoe experiences strange occurrences surrounding a staircase. Zoe wishes to leave, causing Alice to suspect that she is experiencing the same mental breakdown as their institutionalized mother. Louise is warned that people go missing around the neighborhood of Butcher's Block while Zoe encounters Joseph Peach, the patriarch of the Peach family who is believed to be long dead.
14	2	"Father Time"	Arkasha Stevenson	Harley Peyton & Mallory Westfall & Angel Varak-Iglar	February 14, 2018	0.33
Zoe returns home, claiming that Joseph Peach cured her schizophrenia. One of the Peaches, Robert, attacks a local woman and is arrested. He cannibalizes his cellmate but is later released by Chief Vanczyk, much to the frustration of his son Luke. The Peaches invite Alice and her landlord Louise for dinner and magically transport them to their mansion. Joseph offers to operate on Alice to remove her latent schizophrenia. Alice and Louise learn that the Peaches are attacking the local citizens as revenge for the death of the Peach daughters, who were murdered long ago. The meal ends with the two returned to the overgrown local park.
15	3	"All You Ghost Mice"	Arkasha Stevenson	Angela LaManna & Justin Boyd & Nick Antosca	February 21, 2018	0.28
Alice and Louise meet Luke, who is still frustrated with his father's refusal to explain why he released Robert Peach. Zoe has begun to hunger for human flesh and has started to self-cannibalize to avoid attacking others. Alice's co-worker Nathan is attacked and killed by Robert in front of Louise and Luke. Zoe is taken up the staircase to the Peaches; Alice chases after her. Horrified at the events, Luke shoots Robert in the chest.
16	4	"Alice in Slaughterland"	Arkasha Stevenson	Harley Peyton	February 28, 2018	0.25
Alice arrives in a wide field filled with plants resembling human flesh and sees a missing child, Izzy, who was abducted by the Peaches. She also encounters monstrous servants that harvest the field. Meanwhile outside, Robert returns to life and attacks Louise, who kills him once again. When Luke goes to bury the body he is murdered by his father. Zoe has been brought to a meal with the Peaches. She continues to self-cannibalize, aware that the meal is made of human flesh. Alice is brought to the Peaches' meal and toasts with them.
17	5	"The Red Door"	Arkasha Stevenson	Nick Antosca & Justin Boyd & Mallory Westfall	March 7, 2018	0.27
Aldous Peach comes to search for his brother Robert along with his monstrous children; Luke's father takes him to the grave to show the body as well as proof that Luke was killed in retribution. Luke's body is missing, as he was rescued by Louise. Luke's father decides to fight against the Peaches and kills Aldous and his children by cutting off their heads. Alice decides to allow Joseph to fully remove her schizophrenia, which is represented by a bug. Zoe discovers that the Peaches are sacrificing local children to the Pestilent God. Izzy was meant to be the latest sacrifice, but is rescued by Zoe. The god kills one of the Peaches despite Joseph's promises to retrieve Izzy.
18	6	"Sacrifice Zone"	Arkasha Stevenson	Nick Antosca & Harley Peyton & Angela LaManna	March 14, 2018	0.34
Alice learns that the Peaches sacrifice children in exchange for their current existence. Zoe eats Alice's schizophrenia "bug" in order to regain her humanity. Both sisters return to the real world, where Alice immediately cannibalizes a debt collector. Izzy is recaptured and returned to the sacrificial site, but is rescued at the last moment by Zoe and the others. Furious, the Pestilent God kills the Peaches and breaks Alice's sanity. One year later, Alice is kept in the same institution as her mother, while Zoe is living happily with her friends. One of the Peaches' servants is shown, implying that the Pestilent God is still present in the park.

=== Season 4: The Dream Door (2018) ===
No. overall	No. in season	Title	Directed by	Written by	Original release date	US viewers (millions)
19	1	"Ashes on My Pillow"	E. L. Katz	Nick Antosca	October 26, 2018	0.32
Newlyweds Jill and Tom move into his childhood home. They discover a strange door leading to a small blue door, which they are unable to open. Jill is able to open it the next day, releasing a clown-like creature. She calls the police, who are unhelpful. Jill begins to suspect that Tom is cheating on her and interacts with a woman named Sarah, who threatens police involvement if Tom doesn't leave her alone. Trying to find the truth, Jill follows Tom one night and sees him enter another woman's home. Jill asks his friend Jason for the truth. The two argue and the creature stabs Jason to death.
20	2	"Where Did You Sleep Last Night"	E. L. Katz	Alexandra Pechman & Nick Antosca	October 27, 2018	0.32
Thinking of the basement door, Jill recalls a similar one at her own childhood home. She confirms its existence and realizes that the creature is actually her imaginary childhood friend Pretzel Jack. She has a vision of Pretzel Jack, however he disappears once Tom enters the room. Jill informs her therapist, who believes this to be a stress induced hallucination, however her friend Ian believes her and suggests that Pretzel Jack's appearances are tied to her emotional state. Meanwhile, Tom has been trying to interact with Sarah's child, who is implied to be Tom's son, frustrating Sarah. The woman Tom has been seeing is revealed to be a healer named Vanessa, who has been giving him hydrotherapy. She is also, unbeknownst to Tom, the mistress of Jill's father. The episode ends with Pretzel Jack attempting to drown Tom after Jill receives a phone call from Sarah.
21	3	"Love Hurts"	E. L. Katz	Lenore Zion & Lisa Long	October 28, 2018	0.27
Tom is able to escape Pretzel Jack, but ends up at the hospital after he gets into an accident while trying to flee. At the hospital, Tom confesses to Jill that he had an affair with Sarah that resulted in a pregnancy. This enrages Jill, causing Pretzel Jack to briefly appear. The couple goes to Jill's therapist, who is killed by Pretzel Jack after upsetting Jill. Despite everything, Tom is reluctant to see Pretzel Jack as a supernatural entity. He is only willing to believe after the two talk with Ian, as he is able to produce a blue door of his own, containing a small cat. Ian claims that Pretzel Jack is a tulpa and that he is tied to a physical form, a body resembling Pretzel Jack that is present in the couple's basement. He further states that Jill can control him as long as she can control her emotions. This proves to be the case and Jill is able to successfully control Pretzel Jack. The episode ends with the appearance of Sarah at the couple's home.
22	4	"Bizarre Love Triangle"	E. L. Katz	Story by : Mallory Westfall & Isabella Gutierrez; Teleplay by : Mallory Westfall	October 29, 2018	0.17
During her childhood Jill was always drawing pictures of a character named Pretzel Jack until one day he appeared in reality. Although initially scared, the two became fast friends. In modern day, Ian tells Jill that once she can control her tulpa, she can also get rid of him if she desires. During their talk they notice Tom and Sarah talking outside. This angers Pretzel Jack, who attacks and stabs Sarah. Tom escapes with Sarah and the two take refuge at a school gym, where the two make amends and Tom learns that he is not the father of Sarah's son. They are again attacked by Pretzel Jack, who tries to drown Tom in the school's pool. Jill is able to take control of Pretzel Jack and is able to crush the creature using her mind, but is warned that he could re-appear as his physical form has not been destroyed. Tom begins to wonder if Ian has ulterior motives. The group ends up back at the hospital, where the police are growing suspicious of Jill's involvement in all of the attacks. Jill decides that she wants to learn how to control her tulpa and her mind. She begins to feel ill, something Ian says is a normal response to all of the recent trauma. He invites her to his family's summer home, which feels oddly familiar to Jill. Later that night Tom receives a voicemail from Jill's father Bill, who has been trying to reach her without success as Ian had taken and smashed her phone.
23	5	"You Belong to Me"	E. L. Katz	Angel Varak-Iglar & Justin Boyd	October 30, 2018	0.26
Under Ian's tutelage, Jill is able to create a new, albeit deformed tulpa of a rabbit. She mentions that she still feels strange, which Ian again reassures her is normal after the destruction of Pretzel Jack, her first tulpa. Jill begins to suspect that something is wrong, as things get more and more unsettling. Back at home, Tom has begun investigating Ian and realizes that he is Jill's half-brother through Vanessa. Tom confronts Ian, who tells Jill that he has something to show her. He takes her to the house's garage, where he reveals the corpse of their father. Jill calls the police and Ian claims responsibility for all of the deaths caused thus far by the tulpas, including the deaths of the actual owners of the summer home. Tom and Jill make up and later that night they have sex, causing the creation of a new door. Unlike the others, this door is malformed and produces a strange child-creature that dies in Jill's arms. Later, Ian escapes with the help of his tulpa Tall Boy and returns to the couple's house. Jill comes downstairs to find that she is alone in the house and that a new red door is now present.
24	6	"Two of Us"	E. L. Katz	Story by : Nick Antosca & Isabella Gutierrez; Teleplay by : Nick Antosca & Lisa Long	October 31, 2018	0.24
Ian has captured Tom and taken him to an empty neighborhood filled with his various tulpas. Jill arrives and finds a tulpa created to look like Tom, which Ian created to confuse her. She is able to kill the tulpa just as Tom arrives, as he had managed to escape from Ian. The two talk and Tom admits that he has been a terrible husband to Jill. While she has her own issues, Pretzel Jack was ultimately summoned because he had been gaslighting and mistreating Jill. The two agree to temporarily separate so Jill can focus on resummoning Pretzel Jack. She is eventually successful, just in time for a newly resummoned Pretzel Jack to kill Tall Boy. Aware that his death is only temporary, Jill tracks down Ian, who is ultimately killed by Jill and Tom. The series ends with the two reconciling and having a child together, with the implication that this child will also be able to summon tulpas.

== Production ==
In 2015, Syfy announced that they had greenlit Channel Zero for twelve episodes, which would air as two six-episode seasons. The first season would center upon the popular creepypasta Candle Cove. The second season would focus on a new story, based on the creepypasta The No-End House. Universal Cable Production would serve as the production company for the series, with Max Landis and Nick Antosca both serving as the series' executive producers.

Craig William Macneill was chosen to direct the first season of Channel Zero in February 2016. Paul Schneider and Fiona Shaw were confirmed as starring in Channel Zero's first season in June 2016. Schneider was set to portray Mike Painter, a child psychologist whose twin brother went missing years before and whose mother, portrayed by Shaw, is reluctant to indulge his desire to investigate. Natalie Brown and Shaun Benson were also named as starring in the series. Filming began in Selkirk, Manitoba, Canada during May 2016 and wrapped on July 28, after 46 days of shooting.

Filming for Season 2 was set to start September 13, 2016, in Oakbank, Manitoba. An advance screening of the first episode premiered at San Diego Comic-Con. Creator Nick Antosca revealed on Twitter that season 2 would premiere on September 20, 2017.

Filming for Season 3 took place from July to August 30, 2017, in Winnipeg, Manitoba, Canada.

Filming for Season 4 began in early May 2018 and wrapped that July.

== Music score ==
In season 2, "Bathysphere" by Cat Power plays at the end of the first episode. "Concrete Walls" from Fever Ray's eponymous album plays during the end of the third episode and "Between the Bars" from Madeleine Peyroux's Careless Love plays at the start of the sixth episode.

In season 3, portions of "Koyaanisqatsi" by Philip Glass play during the fifth and sixth episodes. Some of the Kyrie from György Ligeti's Requiem is also heard during the sixth episode. Selections from The Caretaker's An Empty Bliss Beyond This World also recur as motifs throughout all six episodes of the season.

== Broadcast ==
Showcase broadcasts each season in Canada after Syfy has finished airing it within the United States. The horror streaming service Shudder streams all four seasons of the series as of October 10, 2019.

== Reception ==
Critical response of Channel Zero
Season	Rotten Tomatoes	Metacritic
1	86% (21 reviews)	75 (5 reviews)
2	100% (14 reviews)	—N/a
3	100% (11 reviews)	—N/a
4	88% (8 reviews)	75 (5 reviews)

The first season of Channel Zero received generally favorable reviews from critics. On Rotten Tomatoes, it has an approval rating of 86% based on 21 reviews, with an average rating of 6.83/10. The site's critical consensus reads: "Creepy, unsettling, and refreshingly unique, Channel Zero: Candle Cove draws on easily relatable childhood fears while peeling back layers of spine-tingling mystery." On Metacritic it has a rating of 75 out of 100 based on 5 reviews.

The second season received highly favorable reviews from critics. On Rotten Tomatoes, it has an approval rating of 100% based on 14 reviews, with an average rating of 8.4/10. The site's critical consensus reads: "No End House's central mystery is stronger and scarier than Channel Zero's first, solidifying its status as one of TV's scariest horror offerings."

The third season on Rotten Tomatoes has an approval rating of 100% based on 11 reviews, with an average rating of 8.5/10. The site's critics consensus reads, "Creepier than ever, Channel Zero: Butcher's Block delivers the disturbing elements a good horror demands, with the added bonus of a solid narrative."

The fourth season on Rotten Tomatoes has an approval rating of 88% based on 8 reviews. On Metacritic, it holds a rating of 75 out of 100 based on 5 reviews.

=== Ratings ===
Channel Zero : U.S. viewers per episode (thousands)

Season	Episode number					
Season	1	2	3	4	5	6
Candle Cove	761	630	552	470	440	421
No-End House	392	380	410	480	410	374
Butcher's Block	380	330	282	254	270	340
The Dream Door	322	324	273	173	260	240

Audience measurement performed by Nielsen Media Research

==== Season 1: Candle Cove (2016) ====
Viewership and ratings per episode of Channel Zero
No.	Title	Air date	Rating (18–49)	Viewers (millions)	DVR (18–49)	Total (18–49)
1	"You Have to Go Inside"	October 11, 2016	0.2	0.76	0.2	0.4
2	"I'll Hold Your Hand"	October 18, 2016	0.2	0.63	0.2	0.4
3	"Want to See Something Cool?"	October 25, 2016	0.2	0.55	0.2	0.4
4	"A Strange Vessel"	November 1, 2016	0.2	0.47	—N/a	—N/a
5	"Guest of Honor"	November 8, 2016	0.1	0.44	—N/a	—N/a
6	"Welcome Home"	November 15, 2016	0.1	0.42	0.2	0.3

==== Season 2: No-End House (2017) ====
Viewership and ratings per episode of Channel Zero
No.	Title	Air date	Rating (18–49)	Viewers (millions)
1	"This Isn't Real"	September 20, 2017	0.1	0.39
2	"Nice Neighborhood"	September 27, 2017	0.1	0.38
3	"Beware the Cannibals"	October 4, 2017	0.2	0.41
4	"The Exit"	October 11, 2017	0.2	0.48
5	"The Damage"	October 18, 2017	0.1	0.41
6	"The Hollow Girl"	October 25, 2017	0.1	0.37

==== Season 3: Butcher's Block (2018) ====
Viewership and ratings per episode of Channel Zero
No.	Title	Air date	Rating (18–49)	Viewers (millions)
1	"Insidious Onset"	February 7, 2018	0.1	0.38
2	"Father Time"	February 14, 2018	0.1	0.33
3	"All You Ghost Mice"	February 21, 2018	0.1	0.28
4	"Alice in Slaughterland"	February 28, 2018	0.1	0.25
5	"The Red Door"	March 7, 2018	0.1	0.27
6	"Sacrifice Zone"	March 14, 2018	0.1	0.34

=== Awards and nominations ===
Year	Award	Category	Nominee(s)	Result
2017	Saturn Awards	Best Television Presentation	Channel Zero	Nominated
2017	Fangoria Chainsaw Awards	Best TV Series	Channel Zero: Candle Cove	Nominated
2017	Fangoria Chainsaw Awards	Best TV SFX	Doug Morrow	Nominated
2017	Fangoria Chainsaw Awards	Best TV Actor	Paul Schneider	Nominated
2017	Fangoria Chainsaw Awards	Best TV Supporting Actress	Fiona Shaw	Nominated
2018	Saturn Awards	Best Television Presentation	Channel Zero	Nominated
