= Across the Hall =

2009 film directed by Alex Merkin

- Theaterical release poster
- Directed by: Alex Merkin
- Written by: Alex Merkin; Jesse Mittelstadt; Julien Schwab
- Produced by: Jeff Bowler; Stephen Fromkin; Marco Garibaldi
- Starring: Mike Vogel; Brittany Murphy; Danny Pino; Natalie Smyka
- Cinematography: Andrew Carranza
- Edited by: Alex Merkin
- Music by: Bobby Tahouri
- Distributed by: Image Entertainment
- Release dates: August 27, 2009 (Germany); October 30, 2009 (United States)
- Running time: 93 minutes
- Country: United States
- Language: English
- Budget: $4 million

Across the Hall is a 2009 American neo-noir horror film directed by Alex Merkin and starring Mike Vogel, Brittany Murphy, and Danny Pino. It is based on the 2005 short film of the same name and was Murphy's final film released during her lifetime.

== Plot ==
Convinced that his fiancée is cheating on him, a man follows her to a hotel and calls his best friend to help him avoid a calamity.

== Cast ==
- Mike Vogel as Julian
- Danny Pino as Terry
- Brittany Murphy as June
- Natalie Smyka as Anna
- Brad Greenquist as The Porter

== Critical response ==
The film has been praised by its stylish manufacture and outstanding performance by the main actors. The contrast between the emotions experienced by the main characters against the background of the rundown hotel and the formality of the porter has been pointed out as a great plot device. Nevertheless, some critics believe that the expansion of the short feature into a longer film was not entirely successful.
