= Mike Vogel =

American actor

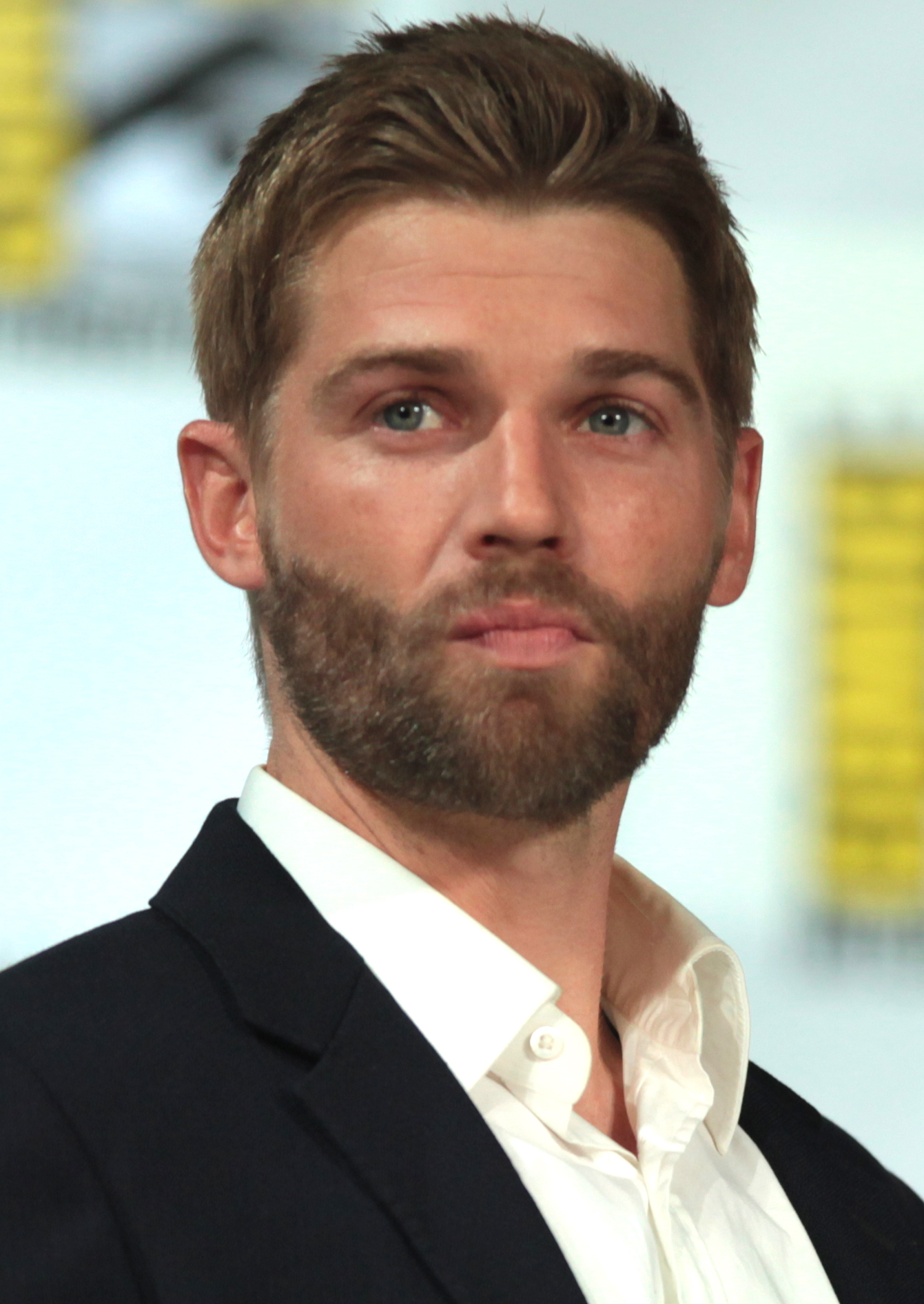
- Vogel at San Diego Comic-Con in July 2014
- Born: Michael James Vogel; July 17, 1979 (age 47); Warminster, Pennsylvania, U.S.
- Occupations: Actor, model
- Years active: 2001–present
- Spouse: Courtney Vogel (m. 2003)
- Children: 3

Michael James Vogel (born July 17, 1979) is an American actor. Vogel began acting in 2001 and has appeared in several films and series, including The Texas Chainsaw Massacre, The Sisterhood of the Traveling Pants, Grind, Poseidon, Blue Valentine, The Help, Bates Motel, Cloverfield, Under the Dome and The Case for Christ. He starred as the lead in the NBC military drama series The Brave for the 2017–18 season.

== Early life and career ==
Vogel was born in Abington Township, Pennsylvania, a suburb of Philadelphia, to Kathy and Jim Vogel, and was raised in Warminster Township, Pennsylvania. He is of German descent. Both of his grandfathers fought in World War II; one was a tank commander who fought in the Battle of the Bulge, and the other was a Seabee in the Navy. Vogel has two younger siblings: a brother, Daniel Aaron, and a sister, Kristin. He attended William Tennent High School, where he was on the freshman wrestling team.

He also attended Cairn University in Langhorne, Pennsylvania in 1998. During the early 2000s, he frequently traveled to New York City in order to audition for acting roles and modeling slots.

== Career ==
In 1993, he competed on Nickelodeon GUTS with Christy "Blast" Gast and Cam "The Ice Man" Burke, and finished with the silver medal. He tied with the other players for first place on Over the Top and also won the Aggro Crag event, coming from third place to take second overall. He was known as Mike "Flea" Vogel and was dressed in blue.

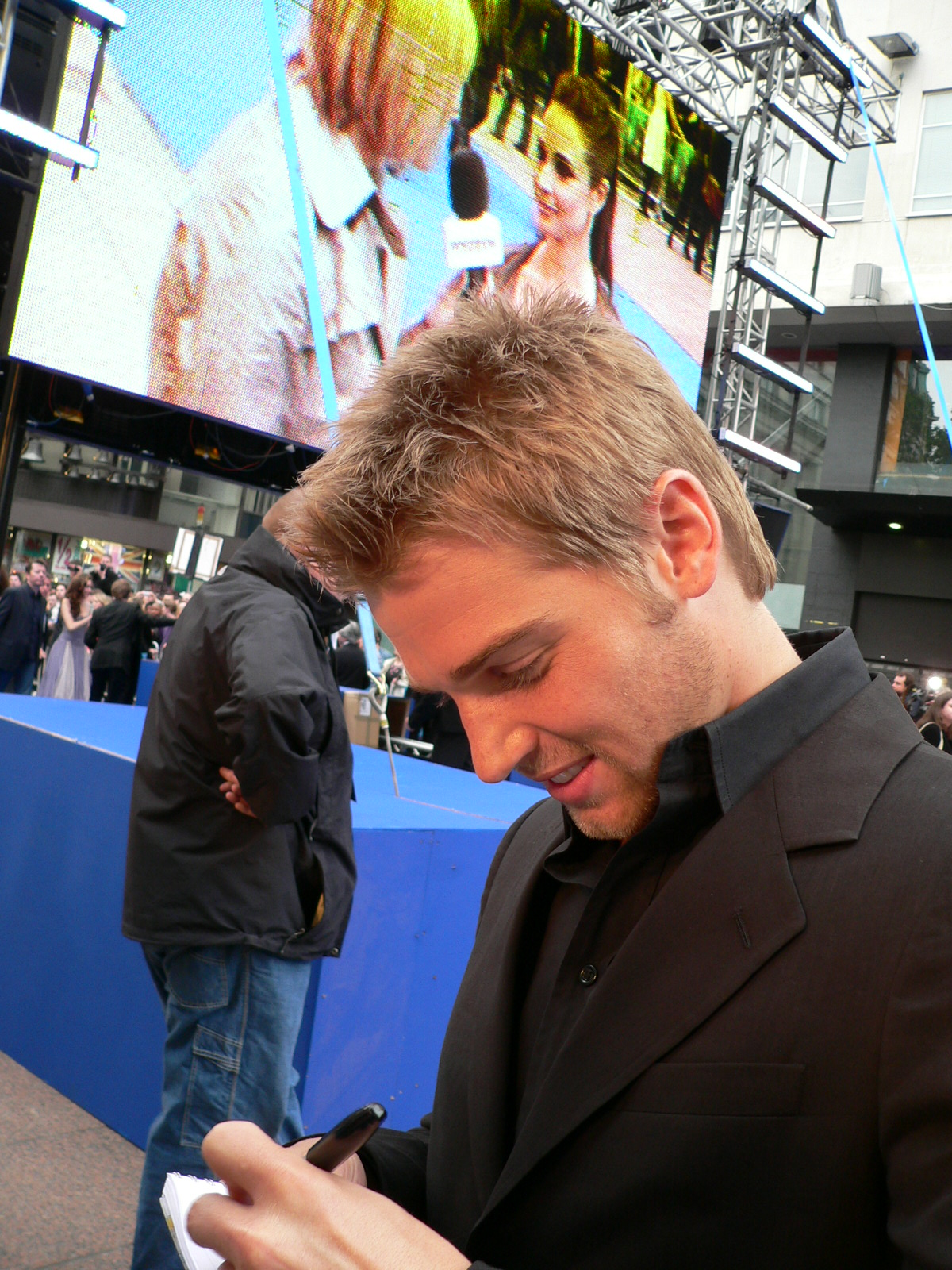
Vogel at the London premiere of Poseidon in May 2006

Vogel began modeling jeans for Levi Strauss & Company. He was subsequently cast in the television series Grounded for Life, appearing in a recurring role between 2001 and 2004.

His first film role was in the skateboarding-themed Grind, which was released on August 15, 2003. The film's co-stars included Adam Brody and Jennifer Morrison. Vogel's next role was in the made-for-television remake of Wuthering Heights, which premiered on MTV in September 2003. In the film, Vogel played Heath opposite Erika Christensen's Kate. Vogel's last 2003 role was in the remake of The Texas Chainsaw Massacre, which was released in October and had high box office performance.

In 2005, after Grounded for Life was canceled, Vogel appeared in four film roles. First, he played Eric Richman, the romantic interest of Blake Lively's character in The Sisterhood of the Traveling Pants, which had a June release. His next role was the lead in the low-budget film, Supercross, which was theatrically released in August. Vogel filmed his role in Havoc, a dark, R-rated drama also starring Anne Hathaway, in 2003, but the film was not released until November 2005. It bypassed theaters and was released directly-to-video. Vogel's final 2005 role was in Rumor Has It..., starring Jennifer Aniston, in which he had a supporting role as the son of Kevin Costner's character.

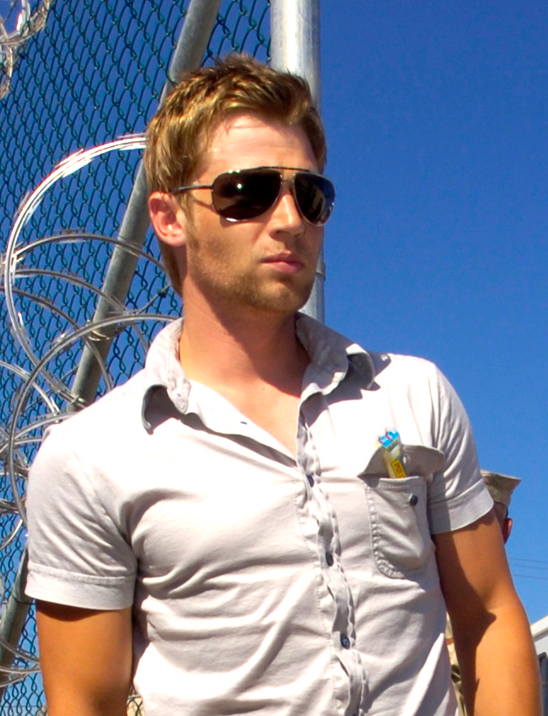
Vogel at Joint Task Force Guantanamo in June 2008

Vogel's first 2006 role was in the disaster film Poseidon, a remake of the 1972 film The Poseidon Adventure; he plays the fiancé of Emmy Rossum's character. The film, which had a budget of $160m, opened on May 12 and grossed $181,674,817 at the international box office. Vogel was originally offered the role of Angel in X-Men: The Last Stand, but backed out to appear in Poseidon. The same year, he appeared in Caffeine, a romantic comedy and signed to appear in a horror movie called Open Graves, shot in Spain.

In 2007, Vogel appeared in the film The Deaths of Ian Stone, part of the horror film festival 8 Films to Die For. In 2009, Vogel starred in the neo-noir film Across the Hall and the horror film Open Graves. He was part of the 2010 romantic comedy film She's Out of My League, Blue Valentine, TV series Miami Medical, and Heaven's Rain.

Vogel was part of the 2011 comedy film What's Your Number? and plays Johnny Foote in the film adaption The Help. He most recently played Dean on the short-lived ABC drama Pan Am (based on the history of the defunct airline of the same name).

In 2013, he participated in Howard Goldberg's comedy Jake Squared, where he plays against among others, Elias Koteas, Virginia Madsen and Jane Seymour. He also appeared in McCanick, and the first six episodes of Bates Motel. This was A&E's contemporary prequel series to the 1959 novel Psycho.

BuddyTV ranked him #96 on its list of "TV's Sexiest Men of 2011".

Vogel starred as Dale "Barbie" Barbara on the CBS science fiction drama series Under the Dome, based on the novel of the same name by Stephen King. The show aired as a summer series on CBS; it ran for three seasons on the network, ending in September 2015.

In 2014, Vogel received a role in the Hallmark Hall of Fame's romantic TV movie In My Dreams, in which he played opposite, among others, Katharine McPhee and JoBeth Williams. In the same year he played in the drama thriller The Boy, which tells the story of a 9-year-old sociopath, who was played by Jared Breeze.

In 2015, Vogel starred in the miniseries Childhood's End, based on the novel of the same name written by Arthur C. Clarke.

In 2017, Vogel starred in the film adaptation of Lee Strobel's The Case for Christ, portraying the author and teaming up again with co-star Erika Christensen.

On September 25, 2017, NBC debuted The Brave, for the 2017–18 season. A small team of hardcore military-intelligence agents from varied branches of the service is selected for special, difficult missions. Among the leads is Vogel's character, Capt. Adam Dalton, the team's communications director and a former Delta Force operative. He reports to the character played by series lead Anne Heche. The series was cancelled after one season.

In December 2018, it was announced that Vogel will star in the Netflix psychological thriller Secret Obsession. The film was released on July 18, 2019.

In February 2019, Vogel played the lead role of David Roman in the ABC science-fiction pilot Triangle which was written by Jon Feldman and Sonny Postiglione. ABC passed on the project in September 2019.

In March 2020, it was announced that Vogel would star in an upcoming Netflix series, Sex/Life.

== Personal life ==
Vogel married Courtney, a former model, in January 2003. They have three children: Cassy Renee (b. February 20, 2007), Charlee Bea (b. June 2, 2009), and Gabriel James (b. September 25, 2013). They reside in Nashville, Tennessee.

== Filmography ==
=== Film ===
Year	Title	Role	Notes
2003	Grind	Eric Rivers	
2003	The Texas Chainsaw Massacre	Andy Gordone	
2005	Supercross	Trip Carlyle	
2005	The Sisterhood of the Traveling Pants	Eric Richman	
2005	Havoc	Toby	
2005	Rumor Has It...	Blake Burroughs	
2006	Poseidon	Christian Sanders	
2006	Caffeine	Danny	
2007	The Deaths of Ian Stone	Ian Stone	
2008	Cloverfield	Jason "Hawk" Hawkins	
2009	Across the Hall	Julian	
2009	Open Graves	Jason	
2010	Blue Valentine	Bobby Ontario	
2010	She's Out of My League	Jack	
2010	Heaven's Rain	Brooks Douglass	
2011	The Help	Johnny Foote	Broadcast Film Critics Association Award for Best Cast; National Board of Review Award for Best Cast; Satellite Award for Best Cast – Motion Picture; Screen Actors Guild Award for Outstanding Performance by a Cast in a Motion Picture; Southeastern Film Critics Association Award for Best Cast; Nominated - Central Ohio Film Critics Association for Best Cast
2011	What's Your Number?	Dave Hansen	
2013	McCanick	Floyd Intrator	
2013	Jake Squared	Actor Jake	
2015	The Boy	Brandon	
2016	Wild Man	Brock	
2017	The Case for Christ	Lee Strobel	
2017	Battle of the Sexes	Nightclub Dancer	
2018	The Amendment	Brooks Douglass	Was first released in 2010 titled Heaven's Rain
2019	Secret Obsession	Russell Williams / Ryan Gaerity	
2020	Fantasy Island	Lieutenant Sullivan	
2021	Collection	Ross	

=== Television ===
Year	Title	Role	Notes
1993	Nickelodeon Guts	Himself	Known as Mike "Flea" Vogel
2001–2004	Grounded for Life	Dean Piramatti	15 episodes
2003	Wuthering Heights	Heath	Television film
2010	Miami Medical	Dr. Chris "C" Deleo	Main role
2011	Pan Am	Dean Lowrey	Main role
2013	Bates Motel	Deputy Zack Shelby	7 episodes
2013–2015	Under the Dome	Dale "Barbie" Barbara	Main role
2014	In My Dreams	Nick Smith	Television film
2015	Childhood's End	Ricky Stormgren	Miniseries
2017–2018	The Brave	Captain Adam Dalton	Main role
2021–2023	Sex/Life	Cooper Connelly	Main role
2021	American Horror Story: Double Feature	John F. Kennedy	2 episodes
2024	Law & Order	Detective Miles Brandt	Episode: "Bad Apple"
2025-	Boston Blue	Seth Yates	Recurring role
2026	Scarpetta	Bill Boltz	
2026	Home to Harmony	Sam Gardner	
