= Lizzie (2018 film) =

American film directed by Craig William Macneill

- Theatrical release poster
- Directed by: Craig William Macneill
- Written by: Bryce Kass
- Produced by: Naomi Despres; Elizabeth Destro; Chloë Sevigny
- Starring: Chloë Sevigny; Kristen Stewart; Jay Huguley; Jamey Sheridan; Fiona Shaw; Kim Dickens; Denis O'Hare; Jeff Perry
- Cinematography: Noah Greenberg
- Edited by: Abbi Jutkowitz
- Music by: Jeff Russo
- Production companies: Artina Films; Destro Films; Powder Hound Pictures; The Solution Entertainment Group
- Distributed by: Saban Films; Roadside Attractions
- Release dates: January 19, 2018 (Sundance); September 14, 2018 (United States); December 14, 2018 (United Kingdom)
- Running time: 105 minutes
- Country: United States
- Language: English
- Box office: $844,786

Lizzie is a 2018 American biographical thriller film directed by Craig William Macneill, written by Bryce Kass, and starring Chloë Sevigny, Kristen Stewart, Jay Huguley, Jamey Sheridan, Fiona Shaw, Kim Dickens, Denis O'Hare, and Jeff Perry. It is based on the true story of Lizzie Borden, who was accused and acquitted of the axe murders of her father and stepmother in Fall River, Massachusetts, in 1892. Sevigny also served as a co-producer.

The film had its world premiere at the Sundance Film Festival on January 19, 2018. It was released on September 14, 2018, by Saban Films and Roadside Attractions.

== Plot ==
In 1892 Fall River, Massachusetts, 32-year-old Lizzie Borden resides with her domineering father, Andrew; stepmother, Abby, and elder sister, Emma. While the Borden family are prominent members of the community, Lizzie's day-to-day life is under the strict control of her father. One day, an Irish immigrant, Bridget "Maggie" Sullivan, moves into the Borden residence to work as a servant. That night, Lizzie attends an opera and has a seizure during the performance. After she recovers, she and Bridget quickly form a close bond as Lizzie attempts to give the illiterate Bridget a formal education.

On several occasions, the household is disrupted by trespassers and written threats, which Lizzie believes are connected to her father's recent acquisition of land. Lizzie overhears a discussion between her father and her uncle John, the town constable and brother of Lizzie and Emma's deceased mother, during which Andrew imparts that his estate will be bestowed on Abby rather than his daughters. The next morning, Lizzie raids Abby's jewelry casket and hawks its contents at a local pawnbroker. Enraged by the robbery, Andrew kills Lizzie's pet pigeons, which he has Bridget prepare for dinner. One morning, Bridget becomes distraught after receiving a letter from Ireland disclosing her mother's death. Late that night, Lizzie hears her father sexually assaulting Bridget in the attic servants' quarters. Lizzie smashes a hand mirror in her bedroom and sprinkles the glass at Bridget's door, causing Andrew to cut his feet when leaving.

Lizzie and Bridget's bond grows increasingly close, and with Bridget able to write, the two leave letters for one another around the house. Their relationship develops into a romance and they become lovers. Lizzie also discovers that her Uncle John has been leaving threatening notes; when she confronts him about them, he assaults her, which Bridget witnesses. One afternoon, Andrew spies Lizzie and Bridget having sex in the barn. He later calls Lizzie an abomination and forbids her from associating with Bridget, whom he intends to dismiss. That night, Lizzie burns her father's will on the kitchen stove. The next day, August 4, Andrew and Abby's bodies are found in the house, both bludgeoned with a hatchet. Law enforcement swiftly suspects Lizzie is responsible, though Emma proclaims her sister's innocence. Lizzie is formally charged with both murders and stands a closed trial. Bridget visits Lizzie in jail and asks her to cease all contact before boarding a train to Montana.

A climactic flashback shows both Lizzie and Bridget carrying out the murders: That morning, Lizzie strips nude and hides in Abby's bedroom while Andrew goes for his morning walk. Bridget brings Abby a doctored telegram notifying her of a friend's illness. When Abby rushes to her room to prepare to leave, Lizzie bludgeons her multiple times in the face and head with a hatchet. Bridget, outside washing windows, is sickened by the sounds and vomits. Lizzie cleans herself and redresses. When Andrew returns, Lizzie tells him she is going outside to pick fruit. Meanwhile, Bridget undresses and confronts Andrew in the den, armed with a hatchet, but hesitates. Lizzie re-enters the house, takes the hatchet from Bridget, and kills Andrew herself. Afterwards, Lizzie butchers a pigeon with the murder weapon, smearing it with the bird's blood before sawing off the blade and hiding it in a pail in the basement. She then burns the handle and her blood-spattered dress on the kitchen stove.

Lizzie is ultimately acquitted of the murders and lives the remainder of her life in Fall River, ostracized by the community and estranged from Emma. She dies at age 66 and leaves the majority of her estate to the local humane society. Bridget remains in Montana for the rest of her life where she eventually dies, aged 82.

== Cast ==
- Chloë Sevigny as Lizzie Borden, Emma's sister, Abby's stepdaughter, and Andrew's daughter.
- Kristen Stewart as Bridget "Maggie" Sullivan, a housemaid and Lizzie's lover.
- Jay Huguley as William Henry Moody, prosecutor.
- Fiona Shaw as Abby Borden, Andrew's wife and Emma and Lizzie's stepmother.
- Jamey Sheridan as Andrew Borden, Emma and Lizzie's father, Abby's husband.
- Kim Dickens as Emma Borden, Lizzie's sister, Abby's stepdaughter and Andrew's daughter.
- Denis O'Hare as John Morse, Emma and Lizzie's maternal uncle.
- Jeff Perry as Andrew Jennings, Lizzie's defense attorney.

== Production ==
On October 28, 2015, it was announced that Chloë Sevigny and Kristen Stewart had been cast in an as yet untitled film about Lizzie Borden, with Pieter Van Hees to direct from a script by Bryce Kass. Sevigny was cast to play Borden, with Stewart playing her live-in maid Bridget Sullivan. The film's producer would be Naomi Despres, with Playtone executive producing. On May 12, 2016, Craig William Macneill came on board to direct the film.

On November 10, 2016, Jay Huguley was cast in the film to play William Henry Moody, the prosecuting attorney in the case. Elizabeth Destro was also producing the film through Destro Films, along with Despres through Artina Films, and Sevigny with Josh Bachove co-producing, and the film would be financed by Elizabeth Stillwell and Roxanne Anderson through Powder Hound Pictures and Ingenious Media. Fiona Shaw, Jamey Sheridan, Kim Dickens, Denis O'Hare, and Jeff Perry were also cast in the film.

Principal photography on the film began on November 14, 2016, in Savannah, Georgia, and it wrapped on December 16, 2016.

== Release ==
The film had its world premiere at the Sundance Film Festival on January 19, 2018. Saban Films, in partnership with Roadside Attractions, acquired North American rights with plans to release the film during the summer. It was released theatrically in the United States on September 14, 2018.

== Reception ==
=== Box office ===
The film earned $47,580 during its opening weekend of September 14–16, 2018 in the United States, screening in four theaters. The film expanded to 240 screens the following week, September 21. It went on to gross a total of $642,157 in the United States.

=== Critical response ===
On review aggregator website Rotten Tomatoes, the film has an approval rating of 66% based on 152 reviews, with an average rating of 5.9/10. The site's critical consensus reads, "Lizzie forces audiences to take a new look at a widely known true-crime story -- even if the well-acted end result is never quite as gripping as it could be." On Metacritic, which assigns a normalized rating to reviews, the film has a weighted average score of 59 out of 100, based on 32 critics, indicating "mixed or average" reviews.

Katie Walsh of the Los Angeles Times noted that the film possesses a "sense of serious studiousness" and praised its sound design, adding of Sevigny: "The respect for Lizzie means that film almost denies drama, rendering some moments almost inert. It could use an operatic high note, or even a truly deep dark night of the soul, some oscillation in the levels. But the film reflects the evenness with which Sevigny portrays the unflappable Lizzie, cool as a cucumber all the way to court. That control never betrays her or belies an inconvenient truth, and Sevigny's steadiness is almost unnerving." Michael O'Sullivan of The Washington Post similarly wrote that Sevigny "is something of a closed book, delivering a stolid performance that can be read as either strong-willed or stonyhearted."

Jeannette Catsoulis of The New York Times named the movie a Critic's Pick and praised the direction as "focused," and wrote that "Ms. Sevigny's intelligence and formidable control keep the melodrama grounded. Her empathy for Borden, whose fragile constitution belies a searing will, is palpable, as is the sense of inescapable peril surrounding the two female leads." In Variety, Amy Nicholson praised Noah Greenberg's cinematography as "stunning. He frames his actresses with the house, shooting them in shallow focus behind windows and railings to make them look like prisoners. In this airless, dim darkness, they rarely look free." Leslie Felperin of The Hollywood Reporter summarized the film as "elegantly lurid but compelling," also praising Greenberg's cinematography and Sevigny's performance and commenting that Kass’ well-researched script concentrates less on how and more on why. He commendably takes time to elucidate how much the family strife was based on power struggles over money, a factor as motivating as desire, disgust and a thirst for revenge. At the same time, not everything is spelled out too literally, and both the screenplay and Macneill’s sensitive direction leave it to the lead actors to fill in the foreground colors. Henry Stewart of Slant Magazine awarded the film three out of four stars, writing: "The film moves evenly toward a conclusion that feels as inevitable as it does inescapable, while providing a plausible framework for the still-mysterious true crime—even if the script contains a few too many applaudably feminist lines of dialogue. The murders—deliberate, erotic, and unhinged—are withheld until the end, In Cold Blood-style, after we’ve seen bits of testimonies at trial. It's an appropriately harrowing cap to this bleak, haunted, sad, and gruesome story of forbidden romance and its blood-soaked consequences."

The New York Times' chief film critic Manohla Dargis included Lizzie in her top films of 2018 year-end honor roll list.

== See also ==
- The Legend of Lizzie Borden
- Lizzie Borden Took an Ax
- The Lizzie Borden Chronicles
