= The Boy (2015 film) =

American horror film

- Theatrical release poster
- Directed by: Craig Macneill
- Written by: Craig Macneill; Clay McLeod Chapman
- Based on: Miss Corpus 2003 novel by Clay McLeod Chapman; Henley 1961 short film by Craig William Macneill
- Produced by: Daniel Noah; Josh C. Waller; Elijah Wood
- Starring: Jared Breeze; Rainn Wilson; David Morse
- Cinematography: Noah Greenberg
- Edited by: Craig Macneill
- Music by: Hauschka
- Production companies: SpectreVision; Chiller Films
- Distributed by: Chiller Films
- Release dates: March 14, 2015 (SXSW); August 14, 2015 (US)
- Running time: 105 minutes
- Country: United States
- Language: English
- Box office: $5,356,447

The Boy is a 2015 American horror film directed by Craig Macneill, written by Macneill and Clay McLeod Chapman, and starring Jared Breeze, David Morse, and Rainn Wilson. It is based on a short film by Macneill and Chapman, Henley, which was in turn loosely inspired by a novel written by Chapman, Miss Corpus. Breeze plays the titular boy, a budding serial killer.

== Plot ==
Nine-year old Ted lives with his father John in the family's run-down, failing motel in Colorado. Ted's mother has left them; it later transpires she ran off to Florida with one of the motel guests. John is basically a good-hearted man and an affectionate father; but he retreats from his responsibilities into alcoholism and pretty much leaves his son to his own devices. Ted does some chores around the motel, tends to the family's chickens, and plays with his pet bunny. He has developed a morbid hobby of collecting animals that have been killed on the road outside the motel. His father pays him for each roadkill he finds, and Ted saves the money in a tin he hides under his bed. He also puts food on the road, hoping to lure animals.

One day Ted sees a deer on the property and dumps the contents of two garbage bags on to the road, hoping it will entice the deer. His plan works and the deer is later hit by a car, but the car crashes and the driver is slightly injured. He stays at the motel to recover and his vehicle is towed to a nearby junkyard. The police question the driver, William Colby, about the accident but he is curt and uncooperative with them.

Ted watches as his father shoots the injured deer, which John takes back to the motel, for the meat. Ted is fascinated as his father guts the animal, and gives the boy the antlers as a souvenir. Ted fashions the antlers into a sort of helmet.

A couple with a young son check into the motel. Ted searches their car and finds a knife, which he confiscates. He also disables the vehicle so it won't start the next day. Ted forms a friendship of sorts with the son, and also creeps into the family's room at night to watch them sleeping. When the family finally check out, John tells William Colby that Ted sometimes forms strong attachments to motel guests, even hiding in the trunk of one family's car, hoping that he could leave with them.

William asks Ted to lead him to the junkyard, so that he can retrieve items from his car. Among these is a small cardboard box. Ted sneaks into William's room and steals the contents of the box - a bag containing powder. He hides it in one of the vehicles at the junkyard. Whilst there, he sees a large deep hole in the ground with discarded, rusted machinery at the bottom of it; he covers the hole with a tarpaulin and tries unsuccessfully to get a dog to run across the tarp.

The local police, meanwhile, have been watching William, whom they have discovered to be a suspect in the recent death of his wife. The couple had been running insurance scams, involving arson, and William's wife died in a house fire.

William discovers the contents of the box have been stolen and realises it must have been Ted. The “powder” was actually the ashes of William's dead wife. Ted is forced by William to reveal the hiding place of the ashes, at the junkyard. But he runs away with the bag, and when William chases him he falls into the tarp-covered hole. Ted leaves him there, injured and helpless.

When Ted checks his money tin, he finds it is empty. He angrily confronts his father, who admits that he took the money, as he is so short of cash. In a rage, Ted goes to the chicken coop and kicks one of the chickens to death.

John has rented the remaining motel rooms to a group of students during prom week. He is intimidated into giving them a reduced rate. While the students party outside, Ted peeks through a window and sees a girl unconscious on the bed. He enters the room and for a minute or two holds the girl's mouth and nose closed. Her hot-tempered boyfriend returns and accuses Ted of trying to grope the girl. He drags the child outside and beats him savagely. The students retreat to the rooms, leaving the injured boy on the ground.

Ted crawls home to his father and tells him what has happened. John is initially sympathetic but then gets angry and says it is the boy's fault for “not leaving the guests alone”, as he had been told to do.

Later, when everyone has passed out in a drunken stupor (including John) Ted locks the doors from the outside, splashes gasoline everywhere and sets fire to the motel. Wearing his antler helmet, he stands back to watch the blaze and listen to the screams of the trapped students.

Firefighters eventually put out the blaze, but the motel is completely demolished and everyone has died, including John. Police note that William Colby has not been seen recently and conclude that he started the fire. When they ask Ted if he has any other family, he tells them he has a mother in Florida.

== Cast ==
- Jared Breeze as Ted Henley
- David Morse as John Henley
- Rainn Wilson as William Colby
- Bill Sage as the Sheriff
- Mike Vogel as Dad
- Zuleikha Robinson as Mom
- Aiden Lovekamp as Ben
- David Valencia as Marcus

== Themes ==
Film co-writer and director Craig William Macneill said that the themes of the film include "the dangerous blend of isolation, neglect and youth", and that audiences should take from his film a greater interest in the welfare of neighboring children.

== Production ==
The story has its genesis in a book written by Clay McLeod Chapman, Miss Corpus. Chapman said that few people had read it except for Macneill. Fond of one chapter in particular, Macneill suggested they expand it to a short film, which eventually screened at the Sundance Film Festival. SpectreVision took an interest in the short, and it was expanded to feature length. A full trilogy is planned in which the lead character's progress will be examined at the ages of 9, 13, and 18. The trilogy is not based on the book and is original material. Macneill expects the films to be released in quick succession. Filming began on February 17, 2014, in Medellin, Colombia. Colombia was chosen due to its tax incentives and the fact that they could afford to build their own set – something not possible in the United States for their budget. It took six weeks to construct. Composer Hauschka was announced to have joined in April 2014.

== Release ==
The Boy premiered at South by Southwest on March 14, 2015. It received a limited release by Chiller Films on August 14, 2015.

== Reception ==
Rotten Tomatoes, a review aggregator, reports that 68% of 22 surveyed critics gave it a positive review with an average rating of 6.2/10, while Metacritic rated it 45/100 based on reviews from eight critics. Eric Kohn of IndieWire wrote that the film "maintains a gripping sense of atmospheric dread", although its "consistently grave tone sometimes threatens to suffocate the dramatic momentum", while Schmidlin felt that the film has "extremely effective" parts, but it plays into negative stereotypes of "slow burn" psychological dramas. These sentiments were echoed by Ain't It Cool News who praised its "dark, broody tone", and by Dennis Harvey of Variety who wrote that the film seemed "endless and dull".

Of the film's director, Craig Macneill, Carson Lund of Slant Magazine wrote, "Even if his talents tip the scales toward overstatement, Macneill has a command for composition and rhythm that belies his skinny résumé, and one can't help but be unnerved by Breeze's relentlessly deer-in-the-headlights performance as the sociopathic Ted." Samuel Zimmerman of Shock Till You Drop commended Macneill's restraint and noted that his "disinterest in making a traditional slasher, let alone an iconic one, ultimately ends up with one of the most memorable contemporary iterations." Marjorie Baumgarten of The Austin Chronicle also found it "more measured than the usual demon-child fare". Dominick Suzanne-Mayer of Consequence of Sound was impressed by the acting and wrote, "If the film itself slips a little too easily into the banality it’s chronicling at times, The Boy is sustained by the measured performances of the handful of wayward souls in its sparse, bleak world."

Drew Tinnin of Dread Central and Anton Bitel of Sight and Sound both believed that the film rewarded patient viewing. Tinnin wrote that "The slow start (and maybe a little of the middle) does pay off, however, with a conclusion that's shocking even after seeing what Ted’s already been up to", while Bitel found it to be "a slow-burner that builds and builds to its climactic conflagration". Bitel also compared it to Richard Linklater's Boyhood and considered The Boy to be a "disturbing flipside" to Linklater's film that succeeds in creating an "austere and chilling portrait of America's abandoned margins". Andy Webster of the New York Times was impressed overall; he felt that the film worked despite its dramatic shortcomings, and called it "a feature stunning to behold" despite finding it "somewhat unpersuasive in narrative". However, Frank Scheck of The Hollywood Reporter took an opposing view and wrote, "While it's admirable that director Macneill and his co-scripter Clay McLeod Chapman opted to emphasize mood and psychology over the story's more exploitable elements, it nonetheless results in a listless tedium that isn't helped by the overly long running time."

Ken W. Hanley of Fangoria listed The Boy as one of his top ten horror films of 2015 and it also received two Fangoria Chainsaw Award nominations in the Best Supporting Actor and Best Score categories. Zack Sharf and Emily Buder of Indiewire selected the film as one of their "13 Most Criminally Overlooked Indies and Foreign Films of 2015", while HitFix included it in their list of "14 Great Under the Radar Films from 2015".
