= Harrison Montgomery =

2008 film

Harrison Montgomery is a 2008 film directed by Daniel Dávila and starring Martin Landau. Landau's character plays the title role, a game show-obsessed recluse with magical powers and a large stash of money that Ricardo Papa, a small-time drug dealer with artistic pretensions, tries to steal.

The production participated in the San Francisco "Scene in San Francisco Incentive Program" administered by the San Francisco Film Commission.

== Cast ==
- Martin Landau as Harrison Montgomery
- Melora Walters as Margo Fleming
- Brandon O'Neil Scott as Maurice
- Manny Gavino as Jersey
