= Jay Huguley =

American actor

- Born: July 26, 1966 (age 59); Englewood, New Jersey, U.S.
- Occupation: Actor
- Years active: 1995–present

Jay Huguley (born July 26, 1966) is an American film, TV and theatre actor, best known for playing Vice Admiral Mark Dixon on Lioness opposite Nicole Kidman and Morgan Freeman, Whit Peyton on Brothers & Sisters (2006–2007), Will Bransom on Treme (2012–2013), Jimmy Ledoux on True Detective (2014) and David on The Walking Dead (2015).

== Early life and education ==
Huguley was born in Englewood, New Jersey and raised in nearby Tenafly, New Jersey, the youngest of three boys, to father Arthur W. Huguley, III, a commodities trader and president of Westway Trading Corporation, and mother Katherine McCrae Yarborough Huguley, a housewife.

As a child, Huguley spent his teenage years attending the Peddie School, a boarding school in Hightstown, New Jersey, from where he later graduated. He spent a year abroad at the University of London studying political science and graduated from American University in Washington, D.C., with a double major in political science and communications.

Huguley studied acting at the Lee Strasberg Theatre and Film Institute, under the aegis of Anna Strasberg, and at the Beverly Hills Playhouse in Los Angeles, under the world-renowned teacher Milton Katselas.

== Career ==
Prior to his professional acting career, Huguley was a fashion model. Following college, he was discovered working as a lifeguard, when someone working in fashion in New York suggested he should try modeling. Two Polaroids were taken of him, and he was brought into New York City. Soon after. he received a contract with Wilhelmina Models, which sent him to London, Paris, Milan and Sydney, Australia.

Huguley lived in Paris throughout the early-1990s, where he worked as a model for brands like Armani, Valentino, Zegna and Romeo Gigli. He first realized his passion for acting while taking a directing class in college, where one of his assignments was to audition for the school play to get an idea of what actors experience in their process of attempting to score acting roles. He got the part of the Gentleman Caller in Tennessee Williams' The Glass Menagerie. Huguley then moved back to the United States, where he began to work regularly in theatre and studied at the Lee Strasberg Institute. He moved to Los Angeles to do a play directed by Lee's widow, Anna Strasberg.

In his earliest appearances on television, Huguley starred in smaller roles on Mad TV, The Norm Show, Walker, Texas Ranger, Providence, and Strong Medicine before getting more recurring roles in TV shows such as Summerland, and Alias. He also starred in 2010 as Richard Hightower on the long-running soap opera, The Young and the Restless.

Huguley is best known for playing Commander Mark Dixon on Lioness opposite Nicole Kidman and Morgan Freeman, David on AMC's The Walking Dead, and Jimmy Ledoux on HBO's True Detective. Huguley also played Will Branson on seasons 3 and 4 of the HBO series Treme, and Whit Peyton in the ABC TV series, Brothers & Sisters.

Huguley has also played recurring characters in ABC Family's Ravenswood (a spin-off to Pretty Little Liars), and in the CW's Star-Crossed. He's also guest-starred in episodes of Will Trent, Bookie, Found, Big Sky, Crazy Ex-Girlfriend, Red Band Society, Nashville, Breaking In, Drop Dead Diva, and Army Wives.

In 2013, he appeared as Sheriff H.P. Voorhies, the man who negotiated the freedom of Solomon Northup, in Steve McQueen's film 12 Years a Slave, starring Chiwetel Ejiofor, Brad Pitt, and Michael Fassbender.

In 2015, he appeared in Helen Hunt's Ride, and starred as Jonah Bock in Sunny in the Dark, a feature film written by Courtney Ware, for which he took home the award for "Best Actor" from the Northeast Film Festival.

In 2016, Huguley appeared in the horror film, Abattoir, by the man credited for furthering the Saw franchise, Darren Lynn Bousman.

In 2018, Huguley had roles in Heart, Baby and as William Henry Moody, the prosecuting attorney in the infamous Lizzie Borden trial in the film Lizzie alongside Chloë Sevigny and Kristen Stewart.

In 2008, Huguley starred in David Lindsay-Abaire's Tony Award-winning play Rabbit Hole at the Skylight Theatre. About his performance, the Los Angeles Times said, "Jay Huguley dwells inside the play's contradictions and connects us to its anguished, buoyant heart." In 2009, Huguley played the lead role of Henry in Tom Stoppard's play The Real Thing at Los Angeles' Skylight Theatre.

He has played real life historical figures 4 times. Sheriff Voorhies in ‘12 Years a Slave’, William Henry Moody in ‘Lizzie’ opposite Kristen Stewart, Jimmy Swaggart in ‘The Eyes of Tammy Faye’ opposite Jessica Chastain, and Charles Schwab in the upcoming film ‘The Panic.’

In 2025, Huguley will appear in Daniel Minahans feature film ‘On Swift Horses’ opposite Jacob Elordi.

== Filmography ==
=== Film ===
Year	Title	Role	Notes
1995	Vampire Vixens from Venus	Drained Driver	
1995	Call Girl	Arthur Benton	
1998	Brina's Problem	Michael	
1999	Temptations	Tanner	
2003	Melvin Goes to Dinner	Johnny Extra	
2003	Saved by the Rules	Mike	
2005	Silent Men	Richard 'Sadhu'	
2005	Stress, Orgasms, and Salvation	Reverend James	
2012	Hijacked	Tim	
2013	Hot Guys with Guns	Bruce Lieberman	
2013	12 Years a Slave	Sheriff H.P. Voorhies	
2014	Patient Z	Dr. Vincent Gersh	
2014	When the Game Stands Tall	Coach Towne	Uncredited
2014	Ride	Co-worker	
2015	Sunny in the Dark	Jonah	
2016	Carbon Canyon	Mr. Loris	
2016	Abattoir	Felix	
2017	The Hammer	Officer Paul	
2018	Lizzie	William Henry Moody	
2018	Tales from the Hood 2	Fitch Measpine	
2018	Almost Home	Lexus John	
2019	The Hacks	Kevin	
2019	From Zero to I Love You	Eric Dupont	
2019	Killerman	James Manning	
2020	The Glorias	TV Interviewer	
2020	The Eagle and the Albatross	Dean	
2020	The Fox Hunter	Edwin McCushing	
2020	Surviving in L.A.	Mark	
2021	The Eyes of Tammy Faye	Jimmy Swaggart	
2022	The Walk	Riley	
2024	On Swift Horses	Sonny	
2024	The Ghost Trap	Paul	
2025	Blind River	Hooper Miller	
TBA	The Panic	Charles Schwab	Post-production
TBA	Ally Clark	TBA	Post-production

=== Television ===
Year	Title	Role	Notes
1998	Mad TV	Cop	Episode: "Vivica A. Fox"
2000	The Norm Show	Man	Episode: "I've Got a Crush on You"
2000	Walker, Texas Ranger	Detective Rogers	Episode: "Deadly Situation"
2002	Dexter's Laboratory	Hookocho	Episode "Jeepers, Creepers, Where Is Peepers?"
2002	That '80s Show	Bartender	3 episodes
2002	Providence	Georgeous Doctor	Episode: "It's Raining Men"
2002	Meet the Marks	Jay 'the groom'	Episode #1.1
2003	Boomtown	Chris Hamlin	Episode: "The Hole-in-the-Wall Gang"
2004	Strong Medicine	Donald Murray	Episode: "Graft"
2005	Summerland	Doug Fox	3 episodes
2005, 2006	Alias	Dr. Peter Marks	2 episodes
2006	Medium	Larry Greene / Best Man	Episode: "Knowing Her"
2006	Cold Case	Joe Livingston (1979)	Episode: "The Key"
2006	Thick and Thin	Gerard	Episode: "Jen the Model"
2006–2007	Brothers & Sisters	Whit Peyton	6 episodes
2007	What About Brian	Martin First	Episode: "What About the Tangled Web..."
2008	Quarterlife	Arthur	Episode: "Goodbyes"
2010	The Young and the Restless	Richard Hightower	4 episodes
2010	Dad's Home	Brian Westman	Television film
2011	Drop Dead Diva	Kevin Williams	Episode: "Prom"
2012	Breaking In	Sean Hurley	Episode: "The Legend of Hurley's Gold"
2012	Army Wives	Dr. Paul Campell	Episode: "Handicap"
2012–2013	Treme	Will Branson	6 episodes
2013	Nashville	Dewey	Episode: "I'm Sorry for You, My Friend"
2013	The Neighbors	Paul	Episode: "Mother Clubbers"
2013	Anna Nicole	John Lawfton	Television film
2013–2014	Ravenswood	Tom Beddington	3 episodes
2014	True Detective	Jimmy Ledoux	Episode: "After You've Gone"
2014	Star-Crossed	Ray Whitehill	4 episodes
2014	Red Band Society	Sean Fahey	Episode: "So Tell Me What You Want; What You Really Really Want"
2015	CSI: Cyber	Gordon	Episode: "L0M1S"
2015	Crazy Ex-Girlfriend	Young Rebecca's Father	Episode: "I Hope Josh Comes to My Party!"
2015	The Walking Dead	Dave	3 episodes
2016	The Inspectors	Frank Macom	Episode: "No Good Deed"
2016	Halt and Catch Fire	Cal Erickson	Episode: "Rules of Honorable Play"
2016	Rosewood	David B. Jones	Episode: "Boatopsy & Booty"
2016	The Real O'Neals	Gary	Episode: "The Real Tradition"
2019	The Purge	Defense Attorney	Episode: "Blindspots"
2020	NCIS: New Orleans	Ben Kinnaman	Episode: "Relentless"
2022	Big Sky	Harold Gardiner	Episode: "A Brief History of Crime"
2023	Will Trent	Evan Bernard	Episode: "I'm a Pretty Observant Guy"
2023	Outer Banks	Sowell	Episode: "The Dark Forest"
2023	Bookie	Dr. Hegland	Episode: "Beware the Family Jewels"
2024	Lioness	JSOC Commander Vice Admiral Dixon	4 episodes
2024	Found	Alan Allman	Episode #2.19
2026	Cape Fear	Paul	Episode: "Why Would I Want to Hurt You?"
