= Brandon Scott (actor) =

American actor

- Born: Brandon O'Neil Scott; Tuscaloosa, Alabama, U.S.
- Education: New York University (BFA)
- Occupations: Actor; producer
- Years active: 2005–present
- Spouse: Jenn Liu (m. 2017)

Brandon O'Neil Scott is an American actor and producer. He is best known for his roles as Ryan Spalding in the medical drama series Grey's Anatomy (2008–2009), Kohut in the animated comedy film Wreck-It Ralph (2012), Henry in the action-adventure game The Last of Us (2013), Alex in the animated drama series Penn Zero: Part-Time Hero (2015–2017), Jameson in the action-adventure game Uncharted 4: A Thief's End (2016), Coach J.J. Kerba in the teen drama series 13 Reasons Why (2019–2020), Nick Prager in the dark comedy series Dead to Me (2019–2022), and Cory Lawrence in the romantic drama series This Is Us (2019).

== Early life and education ==
Brandon O'Neil Scott was born in Tuscaloosa, Alabama, the youngest of three children. He attended Central High School and later earned a BFA in acting from New York University's Tisch School of the Arts.

== Career ==
Scott began his acting career with a minor role in the 2005 short film Water, and went on to have guest roles on television series such as Law & Order, NCIS: Los Angeles, CSI: NY, Masters of Sex, Bones, and Cold Case. In 2012, he appeared in the films Knife Fight and Stand Up Guys and voiced Kohut in the Disney animated comedy film Wreck-It Ralph. In 2013, he voiced and provided the motion capture of Henry in the action-adventure game The Last of Us, which became arguably his most notable role. He enjoyed portraying Henry, particularly due to the fact that he was allowed to introduce elements of his own personality, and stated that "you don't have to plan [the little nuances] because you get to just be the character". He also felt that recording the voice and motion capture simultaneously was exciting and helpful.

From 2008 to 2009, Scott played Ryan Spalding in the ABC medical drama series Grey's Anatomy for 15 episodes. In 2016, he provided the voice and motion capture of Jameson in the action-adventure game Uncharted 4: A Thief's End and played Peter in the horror film Blair Witch. In 2018, he joined the cast of Channel Zero as Officer Luke Vanczyk for six episodes in the third season. The same year, he played Tom Hodgson for six episodes in the fourth and final season of the show. In 2019, he played Cory Lawrence in the NBC romantic drama series This is Us, as well as Officer Nick Prager in the Netflix dark comedy series Dead to Me. From 2019 to 2020, he appeared as Coach J.J. Kerba in the Netflix teen drama series 13 Reasons Why.

In 2021, Scott is set to join the main cast in the fourth and final season of the Amazon Prime Video legal drama series Goliath.

== Personal life ==
Scott began dating Jenn Liu in 2014, and they were married in 2017.

== Filmography ==
=== Film ===
Year	Title	Role	Notes
2005	Water	Friend	Short film
2008	Harrison Montgomery	Maurice	Credited as Brandon O'Neil Scott
2010	Emergency Contact	Jarvis	Short film
2010	Air	L.J.	
2011	Verbal: Revenge of the Nerds	Nerd #2	Short film
2011	Crying in Public	Sandwich Dropping Crier	Short film
2011	Engagement	Kay	Short film
2012	Knife Fight	Max	
2012	Stand Up Guys	Doctor	
2012	Wreck-It Ralph	Kohut (voice)	
2013	His New Hands	The Man	Short film
2014	Walk of Shame	Josh	
2014	Feast	Additional Characters	Short film
2014	An American in Hollywood	Kareem	
2014	Man with a Movie Camera	Dad	Short film
2015	Rita Mahtoublan Is Not a Terrorist	Rita's Co-Worker #4	Short film Producer
2015	Amaru	Fabien Coyan	
2016	Hard World for Small Things	Dell	Short film
2016	Have You Seen My Boyfriend?	Screaming Man #1	Short film
2016	Blair Witch	Peter	
2016	Half Kings	Rene "El Rey" Chiles	Short film Producer
2017	Manolescents	Marcus	Short film
2017	Big Brother Volcano	Alan	
2017	Sean's New Groove	Roscoe Dunton (voice)	Direct-to-video
2017	Mad Genius	Zip	
2017	Bad Match	Chuck	
2017	Electric Room	Brandon	Short film
2018	Always Remember Me	Adam	Short film
2018	Dark Was the Night	Lucky	
2018	The Amaranth	Arthur	
2018	Bender	Icarus	Short film
2019	A Cohort of Guests	Patrick	Short film
2019	Hoops	Performers / Icarus	Short film
2022	Dead for a Dollar	Elijah Jones	
TBA	Thud †		Post-production

=== Television ===
Year	Title	Role	Notes
2006	Law & Order	Alan Crockett	Episode: "Profiteer"
2007	Life Support	Markus	Television film
2007	The Unit	Bravo	Episode: "Freefall
2007	Heartland	Marcus Brand	Episode: "Picking Up Little Things"
2007	Cold Case	Arthur "Aces" Brown '53	Episode: "Devil Music"
2008–2009	Grey's Anatomy	Dr. Ryan Spalding	14 episodes
2009	Bones	Bartender	Episode: "The Cinderella in the Cupboard"
2009–2010	Seattle Grace: On Call	Dr. Ryan Spalding	6 episodes
2009	Raising the Bar	Dyrell	Episode: "The Curious Case of Kellerman's Button"
2009	NCIS: Los Angeles	Marine LCPL. Alex Walder	Episode: "Keepin' It Real"
2009	Body Politic	Miles Jordan	Television film
2011	CSI: NY	William Dowd	Episode: "Smooth Criminal"
2012	The Middle	Cory	Episode: "The Concert"
2013	Futurestates	Isaac	Episode: "The Living"
2013–2014	Hello Cupid	Cassius	10 episodes
2013	What Would Dylan Do?	Ryan	Television film
2014	Masters of Sex	Jessie Durkin	Episode: "Giants"
2014	Roomie Lover Friends	Cassius	Episode: "#3.5"
2014	Work Mom	Craig	Television film
2015	To Hell and Back	Aaron	Television film
2015–2017	Penn Zero: Part-Time Hero	Alex (voice) / Additional Voices	4 episodes
2015	Stitchers	George	Episode: "Finally"
2016	Imaginary Friend	Brian	Television film
2016–2017	Loosely Exactly Nicole	Raymond	5 episodes
2016–2017	Chef Julian	Cassius	2 episodes
2017	Guerrilla	Leroy	Television miniseries
2017–present	Bronzeville	Maxwell	8 episodes
2018	The Boss Baby: Back in Business	Manager Baby Hendershot (voice)	13 episodes
2018	Channel Zero: Butcher's Block	Officer Luke Vanczyk	6 episodes
2018	Channel Zero: The Dream Door	Tom Hodgson	6 episodes
2019	Dark/Web	Zach Callison	Episode: "Chapter One"
2019–2022	Dead to Me	Nick Prager	17 episodes
2019–2020	13 Reasons Why	Coach J.J. Kerba	10 episodes
2019	This Is Us	Cory Lawrence	3 episodes
2020	Disconnected		
2021	Goliath	Robert Bettencourt	Season 4, main cast
2022–23	The Boss Baby: Back in the Crib	CEO Baby Hendershot (voice)	Recurring cast
2022	Baymax!	Additional voices	3 episodes
2023	Fantasy Island	Seth Rose	Episode: "War of the Roses (And the Hutchinsons)"
2024	The Good Doctor	Nathan Speed	Episode: "Date Night"
2024	The Girls on the Bus	Malcolm	Main role
2026	Chicago Med	Gavin Bennett	Episode: "Things Left Unsaid"

=== Video games ===
Year	Title	Role	Notes
2013	The Last of Us	Henry	Voice and motion capture
2015	Battlefield Hardline	Additional Voices	Voice
2016	Uncharted 4: A Thief's End	Jameson	Voice and motion capture
2016	Battlefield 1	Narrator / Harlem Hellfighter	Voice
2018	Spyro Reignited Trilogy	Additional Voice	Voice
2022	Uncharted: Legacy of Thieves Collection	Jameson	Archival footage Voice and motion capture
