= Naciye =

- Directed by: Lütfü Emre Çiçek
- Written by: Lütfü Emre Çiçek
- Produced by: Lütfü Emre Çiçek
- Starring: Derya Alabora; Esin Alpogan; Görkem Mertsöz
- Cinematography: Kamil Satir
- Music by: Zafer Aslan
- Production company: Sonbay Sanat Ve Produksiyon
- Release dates: 15 October 2015 (Screamfest); 11 March 2016 (Turkey)
- Running time: 81 minutes
- Country: Turkey
- Language: Turkish

Naciye is a 2015 Turkish horror thriller film directed by Lütfü Emre Çiçek, starring Derya Alabora, Esin Alpogan and Görkem Mertsöz.

== Cast ==
- Derya Alabora as Naciye
  - Ilgin Çakir as Young Naciye
- Esin Alpogan as Bengi
- Görkem Mertsöz as Bertan

== Release ==
The film premiered at the Screamfest Horror Film Festival on 15 October 2015.

== Reception ==
Ari Drew of Dread Central rated the film 3 stars out of 5, writing that "Save for a couple of questionable editing decisions – including an ambiguously cut ending and an oddly positioned flashback to the home’s previous residents – Lutfu Emre Cicek stylistically and tonally shows great skill here as a fresh directorial face in the genre." Ian Sedensky of Culture Crypt gave the film a score of 60 out of 100, writing that the film "remains an artistically interesting debut for Lutfu Emre Cicek, although focusing fragmented flourishes with fuller purpose would put more force behind the film." Mark L. Miller of Ain't It Cool News wrote a mixed review of the film, calling it "a potent and surprising little thriller from Turkey with the main fault of really not having any sympathetic characters to care for." Sean Leonard of HorrorNews.net wrote a positive review of the film, writing that "The acting is good across the board, the effects are good, the direction and cinematography are all well done."

Mike Wilson of Bloody Disgusting wrote a mixed review of the film, writing that "With a solid cast, a nice twist on a familiar trope, and the esoteric visuals and score, this should’ve been a great debut by Cicek. Instead, with sequences that drag on far too long and flashbacks that undermine the overall pacing, Naciye really needed to dial back and keep things a little more simple."
