= Brooks Douglass =

American politician (1963–2020)

Member of the Oklahoma Senate from the 40th district
- In office 1991–2003
- Preceded by: Leo Kingston
- Succeeded by: Cliff Branan

Personal details
- Born: Richard Brooks Douglass; September 28, 1963 Norman, Oklahoma, US
- Died: May 9, 2020 (aged 56)

Richard Brooks Douglass (September 28, 1963 – May 9, 2020) was an American film producer and actor, lawyer, businessman, and former state senator in Oklahoma. He died from cancer on May 9, 2020, at age 56.

== Early life ==
Douglass was born in Norman, Oklahoma.

== Legislative career ==
In 1990, when he was only 27, Douglass, running as a Republican, was elected as the youngest State Senator to serve in Oklahoma. His signature legislation was a 1992 bill championing the rights of crime victims. He served from 1991-2003 representing district 40. He also ran unsuccessfully for the U.S. House 6th district in a 1994 special election. While he placed first in the primary, he lost to eventual victor Frank Lucas in the runoff.

== Film career ==
Douglass produced and acted in the film The Amendment. In the film, Douglass portrayed his own father, who had been murdered in 1979.

The Amendment is a film based on the October 15, 1979 murder of his parents, Dr. Richard Douglass, Marilyn Sue Douglass, and the attempted murders of Brooks and his sister Leslie. His father served as pastor of Putnam City Baptist Church and the family resided in Okarche, Oklahoma. Two drifters, Glen Ake and Steven Hatch entered their home, tied the family, including Brooks—then 16—stole $43, then took 12-year-old Leslie into the bedroom where Ake and Hatch both raped her. They then shot all four family members, killing the parents and leaving the two siblings for dead. The movie recounts the brutal story as a backdrop against which a story of forgiveness emerges through the lives of Brooks and Leslie, both of whom have excelled in their respective careers, he as a state legislator, businessman, producer and actor; she as a professional educator.

On June 11, 2011, Douglass and his sister Leslie appeared on Huckabee to talk about how they had come to forgive their parent's killers through their Christian faith.

After a 6 year battle with cancer, Richard Brooks Douglass died in Texas on May 9, 2020.

== Education ==
Douglass received his B.B.A, from Baylor University. He received his MBA, and JD, from Oklahoma City University and his MPA, Harvard Kennedy School of Government.
