= Jared Breeze =

American child actor

- Born: October 3, 2005 (age 20); California
- Occupation: Actor
- Years active: 2013–2019

Jared Breeze (born 2005) is an American child actor. He starred in the title role of the 2015 film, The Boy.

== Career ==
Breeze's first film appearance was in 2014, in Cooties, and his performance brought him to the attention of the producers of The Boy (2015). Breeze was one of the first children to audition for the title role. Craig William Macneill, the director, cited Breeze's "quiet curiosity" as to why he was cast. His performance was well received.

Breeze has also appeared in TV shows, including We Are Men (2013), Your Family or Mine (2015) and Another Period (2018), and he played Max Rayburn in the TV soap opera, The Young and the Restless (2016).

== Partial filmography ==
Year	Title	Role	Notes
2013	We Are Men	Toby	TV series (1 episode)
2014	Cooties	Safety Helmet Boy	Film
2015	The Boy	Ted Henley	Film
2015	Your Family or Mine	Dougie	TV series (2 episodes)
2015	Ominous	Logan	TV movie
2016	The Young and the Restless	Max Rayburn	TV series (33 episodes)
2017	Dances with Werewolves	Neumann as Little Boy	Film
2018	Another Period	Adolf Hitler	TV series (1 episode)
