= Candle Cove =

Online horror story originally written by Kris Straub

- Author: Kris Straub
- Language: English
- Genre: Horror fiction (Creepypasta); Psychological (Thriller)
- Publication place: United States
- Media type: Internet phenomena Digital (web serial)

Candle Cove is an online creepypasta horror story written by web cartoonist and author Kris Straub. The story centers on a discussion of the titular fictional children's television series on an Internet forum. Straub has stated that he was inspired to write the creepypasta after reading an article in The Onion entitled "Area 36-Year-Old Still Has Occasional Lidsville Nightmare", which describes over a 36-year-old having a nightmare about the 1970s children's television series Lidsville.

Straub's story quickly became popular, inspiring numerous YouTube videos and fan fictions. In 2015, Straub self-published Candle Cove in a collection of short stories entitled Candle Cove and Other Stories. The Verge commented that Candle Cove differed from other creepypastas in that while most creepypasta have an "anonymous folkloric quality", Candle Cove originated from a known source and author.

== Synopsis ==
The story is framed as a discussion thread on the fictional "NetNostalgia Forum". Users from the Huntington–Ashland metropolitan area reminisce about Candle Cove, a children's television program broadcast on Channel 58 in the early 1970s. The program centered around a young girl named Janice and her imaginary adventures with marionette pirates. As the thread progresses, the users' recollections of the series become increasingly disturbing; they mention a villainous character known as the "Skin-Taker", a skeleton pirate who wore clothing made of children's skin, and an episode that consisted entirely of the characters flailing and screaming. The story ends with a user relating a recent conversation with his mother about the series; she told him that whenever he claimed to be watching Candle Cove as a child, the television showed nothing but static.

== History ==
"Candle Cove" was originally published by Kris Straub in 2009 on his website ichorfalls.com, under a Creative Commons license. The website hosted Straub's horror stories about the fictional town of Ichor Falls. In a 2011 interview, Straub told Kindertrauma he got the concept of "Candle Cove" from a satirical Onion article titled "Area 36-Year-Old Still Has Occasional Lidsville Nightmare".

Like other creepypasta — a neologism for horror stories circulated around the internet — fans promptly copied and pasted "Candle Cove" across numerous internet forums and websites. It was posted on creepypasta.com and the Creepypasta Wiki, the two largest repositories, as well as sites such as 4chan, Reddit, YouTube, IGN, and horror.com. On some forums, fans recreated the story's exchange as if it actually occurred.

== Television adaptation ==
In 2015, the SyFy Channel announced their intent to adapt the Candle Cove story as the first season of a newly announced series, Channel Zero. The season, named after the creepypasta, expands on the story and centers on a child psychologist who has returned home in order to investigate the 1980s disappearances of his brother and other children. Channel Zero: Candle Cove stars Paul Schneider and Fiona Shaw, and premiered on October 11, 2016.

== Reception ==
Will Wiles of Aeon wrote that Candle Cove was "among the best creepypastas out there" and a good example of using the internet forum format as a storytelling method. Adi Robertson of The Verge praised the creepypasta, stating that it was "a perfectly dark spin on our nostalgia for the half-remembered stories of our childhood, that realization that the things we liked as kids were much, much creepier than we thought."

== See also ==
- Local 58, an analog horror series spinoff of Candle Cove
