= Out of Touch (Euphoria) =

- Euphoria episode
- Nate Jacobs stares at his father.
- Episode no.: Season 2 Episode 2
- Directed by: Sam Levinson
- Written by: Sam Levinson
- Cinematography by: Marcell Rév
- Editing by: Aaron I. Butler
- Original air date: January 16, 2022
- Running time: 57 minutes

Guest appearances
- Minka Kelly as Samantha; Alanna Ubach as Suze Howard; Paula Marshall as Marsha Jacobs; Tyler Chase as Custer; John Ales as David Vaughn; Nick Blood as Gus Howard; Colman Domingo as Ali Muhamand

Episode chronology
| ← Previous "Trying to Get to Heaven Before They Close the Door" | Next → "Ruminations: Big and Little Bullys" |
- Euphoria season 2

"Out of Touch" is the second episode of the second season of the American teen drama television series Euphoria. The episode was written and directed by series creator Sam Levinson. It originally aired on HBO on January 16, 2022 and received mostly positive reviews. The title of this episode is a reference to the 1984 song of the same name by American rock duo Hall & Oates.

The episode's cold open portrays Nate Jacobs (Jacob Elordi) after his assault by Fezco O'Neill (Angus Cloud), imagining a future for himself with Cassie Howard (Sydney Sweeney). In the episode proper, a love triangle forms between Jules Vaughn (Hunter Schafer) and addicts Rue Bennett (Zendaya), and Elliot (Dominic Fike).

== Plot ==
Recovering in hospital, Nate Jacobs (Jacob Elordi) has an epiphany; he is in love with Cassie Howard (Sydney Sweeney). He fantasizes having a family with Cassie, but is hindered by his resentment for his father Cal (Eric Dane). Nate realizes his dreams are out of reach unless he takes back the sex tape of Cal and Jules Vaughn (Hunter Schafer).

Unbeknownst to Jules, Rue Bennett (Zendaya) and Elliot (Dominic Fike) had spent several days together doing drugs. Cassie, who has experienced a major depressive episode since her abortion, continues seeing Nate despite knowing it could ruin her friendship with Maddy Perez (Alexa Demie), whom Nate used to date.

Babysitting for a wealthy family, Maddy is nearly caught wearing the lavish clothes of her boss, Samantha (Minka Kelly). Kat Hernandez (Barbie Ferreira) dreams that Ethan Daley (Austin Abrams) is killed by a Dothraki warrior, who she then has sex with. Kat is unable to figure out why she doesn't love Ethan, believing herself to be the problem.

After leaving the hospital, Nate refuses to tell his parents who attacked him. Cal investigates Nate's assault and pressures Cassie into naming Fezco O'Neill (Angus Cloud) as the attacker. Cassie's sister Lexi argues with her over the decision. In a flashback, Faye Valentine (Chloe Cherry) pushes a motel manager off of a balcony. Her boyfriend Custer hides her from the police at Fezco's home.

In the present, Lexi is confused about how Fezco could be so sweet to her and so cruel to Nate. She realizes how passive she's been her whole life, unable to find the courage to stand up for herself. In an effort to take control of her life, Lexi goes to meet with Fezco at his convenience store. Cal arrives and intimidates Fezco.

Rue briefly sees Cassie getting into Nate's truck while cycling to her Narcotics Anonymous meeting, which she falls asleep during, making her sponsor Ali Muhammad (Colman Domingo) suspicious. Ali gives Rue a ride home and insists that he introduces himself to her mother. Leslie (Nika King) asks Ali how Rue is doing. Ali, who can tell that Rue has relapsed, says she has a long way to go.

Nate relents and tells Cal that Jules, Rue, and Fezco are threatening to go to the police station and accuse Cal of statutory rape. Nate tells Cal that he was looking out for him, Cal apologizes, saying Jules lied about her age. Nate tells him he knows the encounter was recorded. The episode ends with Nate staring at Cal as he repeatedly asks if he has the disk.

== Production ==
=== Writing ===
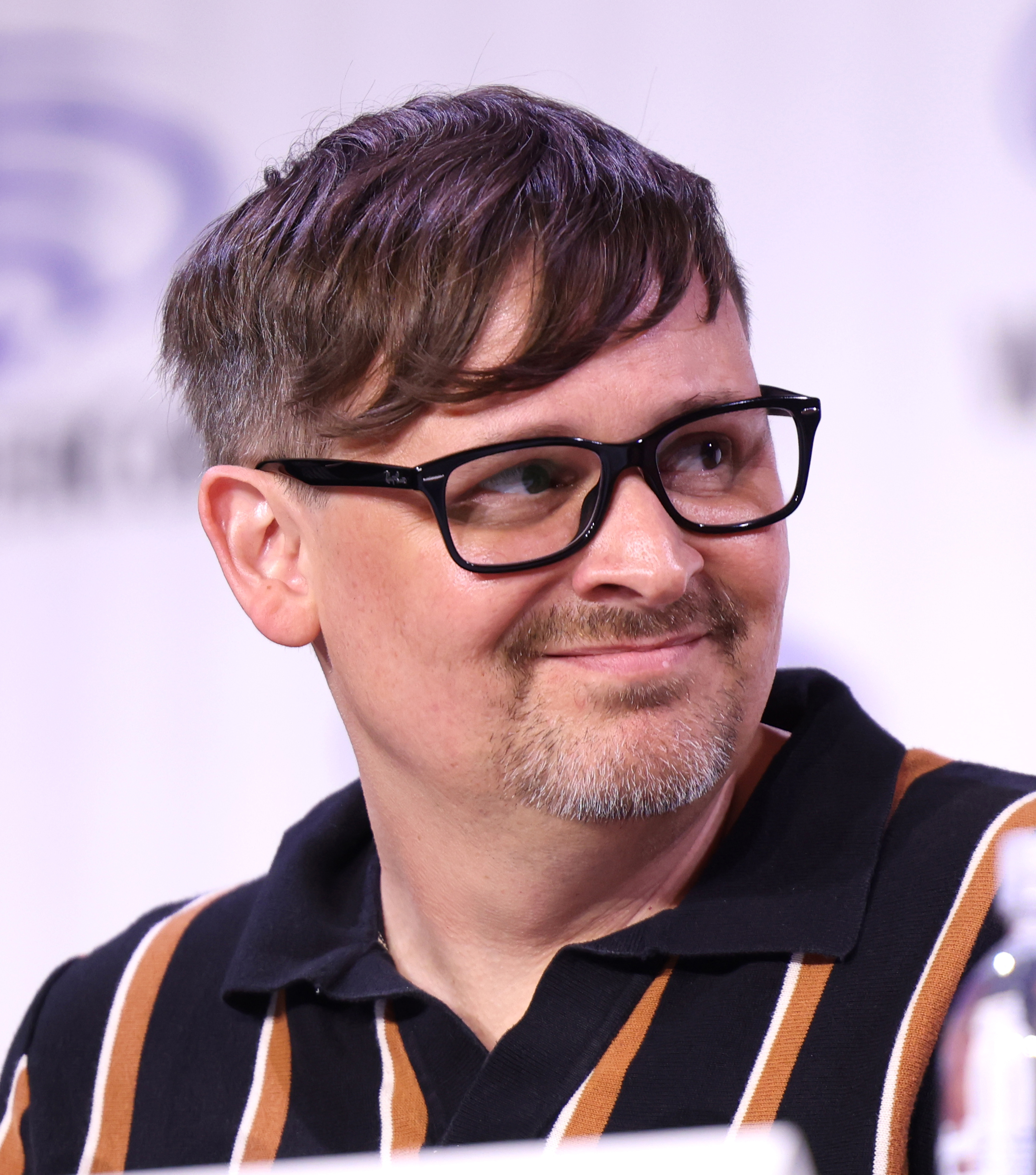
Aaron I. Butler edited the episode.

"Out of Touch" by American rock duo Hall & Oates from their 1984 album Big Bam Boom is the origin of the episode's title. This name was chosen to parallel several 'out of touch' interactions in the episode: Cal is unaware of his son's affairs, Jules' is unaware of Rue's second relapse, and Maddy is unaware of Cassie and Nate's affair. This episode is the last appearance of Euphoria main cast member Algee Smith as Chris McKay.

=== Filming ===
Location shooting for the scene where Kat, Maddy, Jules, and Ethan have a bowling day out took place at Bowlium Lanes in Montclair, California. This is the first episode edited by Aaron I. Butler, who went on the edit half the episodes of season 2 and most of season 3. He spoke on series creator Sam Levinson direction in an interview, "he's really creative on set, too, you know. He, [sic] and often times he will, you know shoot the scene sort of as scripted, but he's constantly playing and experimenting. 'Oh, let's push the scene in this direction, oh let's change this line, let's add this line, let's start in a different way, let's end in a different way." Butler stated the affect this had on the editing process: "we get all of that. And it is challenging. I think, you know, I think Euphoria as a show, I think it would eat most editors alive."

In a behind-the-scenes video uploaded to Euphoria's YouTube channel, Nate's actor Elordi spoke on the prosthetic makeup process for "having his head caved in": "I got to go to this studio and kind of get this cast made of my head. And then Tara [Lang Shah], my makeup artist, we started at maybe five hours, and then it became four hours, then maybe three and half hours in the makeup chair, just lining the prosthetic up, which was my face, which would like squish my eye. And then I had a contact put in. And then, the coolest thing about the prosthetic was the nurse could actually put stitches through it. So, they put like real stitches in my head. And I think by the end of it, we've done it so much, I started to get phantom pain."

=== Music ===
Noah Cyrus and Lil Xan's song "Live or Die" scores Nate's comatose fantasy sequence. Lexi listens to "Haunted" by Laura Les while riding a bike in the episode. Following this, the song appeared at number 6 on Billboard's Tunefind-powered Top TV Songs chart for January 2022. The episode ends with a song written by series composer Labrinth called "Yeh I Fuckin' Did It".

== Reception ==
=== Ratings ===
According to Nielsen Media Research, upon airing "Out of Touch" was watched by 279,000 people. They estimated that 0.09% of the total 18-49 population in the US was tuning in. Including stats from HBO's streaming service Max, the episode drew 2,600,000 viewers on its first day of release, up 9% from "Trying to Get to Heaven Before They Close the Door". HBO claimed the episode outperformed every episode of the final season of Game of Thrones on social media.

=== Critical reviews ===
Review aggregator website Rotten Tomatoes gives the episode an approval score of 100%, based on 6 critical reviews. In a ranking of the first two seasons and specials, BuzzFeed listed "Out of Touch" at fifteen out of eighteen, writing: "This episode is primarily the come-down from the explosive season 2 premiere, but it's got some good moments scattered throughout. We also get this season's only good Kat scene in this episode, when she goes from a Khal Drogo sex dream to being bullied by a group of social media personalities into loving herself. But that scene (which has not been touched on again since) is not enough to boost it up the rankings." IndieWire placed it in eighteenth in a list which included season three's premiere "Ándale", writing that "Euphoria was never the most narratively complex series, but season 2 was infamously stretched thin, producing eight episodes with maybe just enough plot to support five. That’s how you get something like "Out of Touch", an episode about... nothing really? The plot spins in place for an installment that’s largely stitched together from incoherent individual sequences. Some are good, like Maddy ransacking the luxurious closet of her babysitting employer. And some are meh, like that tense confrontation between Cal (Dane) and Fezco (Cloud), which doesn’t serve much purpose. But a handful are outright awful; for example, that dream sequence where Kat is berated about self-love by beauty influencers feels wildly dated and frustratingly shallow. If you watch Euphoria for the vibes you’ll be satisfied, but if you want strong, compelling drama, look elsewhere."

Iana Murray of Vulture gave the episode three out of five stars writing: "The episode picks up right where we left off, on Nate’s bloody face after a brutal pummeling from Fez. [...] This is when Euphoria’s maximalist style actually comes in handy for telegraphing Nate’s overabundant stress. Jacob Elordi has so far been required to exhibit the emotional range of a race car, so in his place, past, present, sex, rage, and fear are entangled in a cacophonous montage." The A.V. Club praised the episode, writing that "a sense of self-examination runs through the episode, both in the show itself and most of its characters (Cassie being the exception). Characters like Lexi and Kat, who were previously underserved, are coming into focus, even being given a chance to shine."
