= '03 Bonnie and Clyde (Euphoria) =

- Euphoria episode
- Bruising on Maddy Perez is photographed.
- Episode no.: Season 1 Episode 5
- Directed by: Jennifer Morrison
- Written by: Sam Levinson
- Cinematography by: Drew Daniels
- Editing by: Harry Yoon
- Original air date: July 14, 2019
- Running time: 53 minutes

Guest appearances
- Elpidia Carrillo as Sonia Perez; Austin Abrams as Ethan Daley; Keean Johnson as Daniel Dimarco; Larry Joe Campbell as Officer Wilson; Jeff Pope as Johnny_Unite_USA; Colman Domingo as Ali Muhamand; Paula Marshall as Marsha Jacobs; John Ales as David Vaughn; Jeremiah Birkett as Principal Hayes; Shiloh Fernandez as Trevor; Mercedes Colon as Kat's Mom; Sean Martini as Minako

Episode chronology
← Previous "Shook Ones Pt. II"	Next → "The Next Episode"
- Euphoria season 1

"'03 Bonnie and Clyde" is the fifth episode of the first season of the American teen drama television series Euphoria. The episode was written by series creator Sam Levinson and directed by Jennifer Morrison. It originally aired on HBO on July 14, 2019. The title of this episode is a reference to the 2002 song of the same name by American rapper Jay-Z.

The episode's cold open introduces young Maddy Perez's (Alexa Demie) prohibition from child beauty pageants, before the episode proper depicts Maddy and her boyfriend Nate Jacobs (Jacob Elordi) attempting to cover up his intimate partner violence toward her. Meanwhile, Rue Bennett (Zendaya) focuses on her relationship with Jules Vaughn (Hunter Schafer).

"'03 Bonnie and Clyde" received positive reviews from critics, with many commenting on the episode's depiction of domestic violence. Out of the six Primetime Emmy Award nominations received by the show for its first season, one was specifically for this episode, Outstanding Music Composition for a Series (Original Dramatic Score) for Labrinth's soundtrack.

== Plot ==
Maddy Perez's (Alexa Demie) participation in child beauty pageants is cut short by her mother Sonia (Elpidia Carrillo), who is horrified after a famous beauty coach is arrested for child sexual abuse. Afterwards, Maddy loses interest in the idea of working and makes the decision that she doesn't want to ever work a job. As a teenager, Maddy begins a tumultuous and abusive relationship with star quarterback Nate Jacobs (Jacob Elordi), which culminates in his attack on her at the travelling carnival.

In the present, Rue Bennett (Zendaya) obsesses over Jules Vaughn (Hunter Schafer) as a replacement for her addiction, and tells her mother Leslie (Nika King) that they are dating. Maddy tries to hide the injuries on her bruised neck, but they are discovered after she passes out at school, after which Sonia presses charges against Nate. Nate's parents Cal (Eric Dane) and Marsha (Paula Marshall) are called in; Jules encounters Cal and asks Rue to stay quiet about her hookup with Cal. Rue asks if Nate knows, and confesses Jules is the first person she is romantically in love with.

Cal instructs Nate not to pay attention to anyone as he is arrested by Officer Wilson (Larry Joe Campbell), while a detective forcefully cuts off Maddy's hoodie and takes evidence photographs. While being interrogated by Wilson, Nate states that Maddy was on MDMA and claims that he only grabbed her arm. He is ultimately let free but suspended from school indefinitely. Meanwhile, Jules' father David Vaughn (John Ales) asks if Rue is her girlfriend, while Rue's mentor Ali Muhamand (Colman Domingo) convinces her to admit to lying about being clean to her Narcotics Anonymous group. Rue then visits Lexi Howard (Maude Apatow) and apologizes for not being a good friend.

Elsewhere, Chris McKay (Algee Smith) sincerely apologizes to his girlfriend, Lexi's older sister Cassie (Sydney Sweeney) for their fight at the carnival, and states that he is proud to be her boyfriend. Maddy argues with Sonia when she compares Nate and her to herself and Maddy's father. Upset, Maddy calls Kat Hernandez (Barbie Ferreira) for solace, but Kat blows her off to give fellatio to Trevor (Shiloh Fernandez), a store clerk she previously sexually fantasized about. Rue, Lexi, and Jules go roller skating together, during which Lexi comments that she is the reason for Rue's improvement, causing Jules to become emotional.

Cal decides to meet with another online hookup at a motel, but becomes distraught and questions if his closeted sexuality made Nate the way he is. Maddy meets Nate at a motel, while Jules takes Rue home with her after roller skating; Jules is unable to sleep, realizing the extent to which Rue's sobriety relies on their relationship.

== Production ==
=== Writing ===
"'03 Bonnie & Clyde" from Jay-Z's 2002 album The Blueprint 2: The Gift & The Curse is the origin of the episode's title. This name was chosen as the loyal relationship between Nate and Maddy in the episode mirrors that between Jay-Z and Beyoncé in the song. The episode was directed by actress Jennifer Morrison. Her Once Upon a Time character Emma Swan was mentioned in episode three "Made You Look" when Kat wrote fan fiction about her. Morrison had also worked with series creator Sam Levinson before, acting in his feature film Assassination Nation (2018).

=== Filming ===
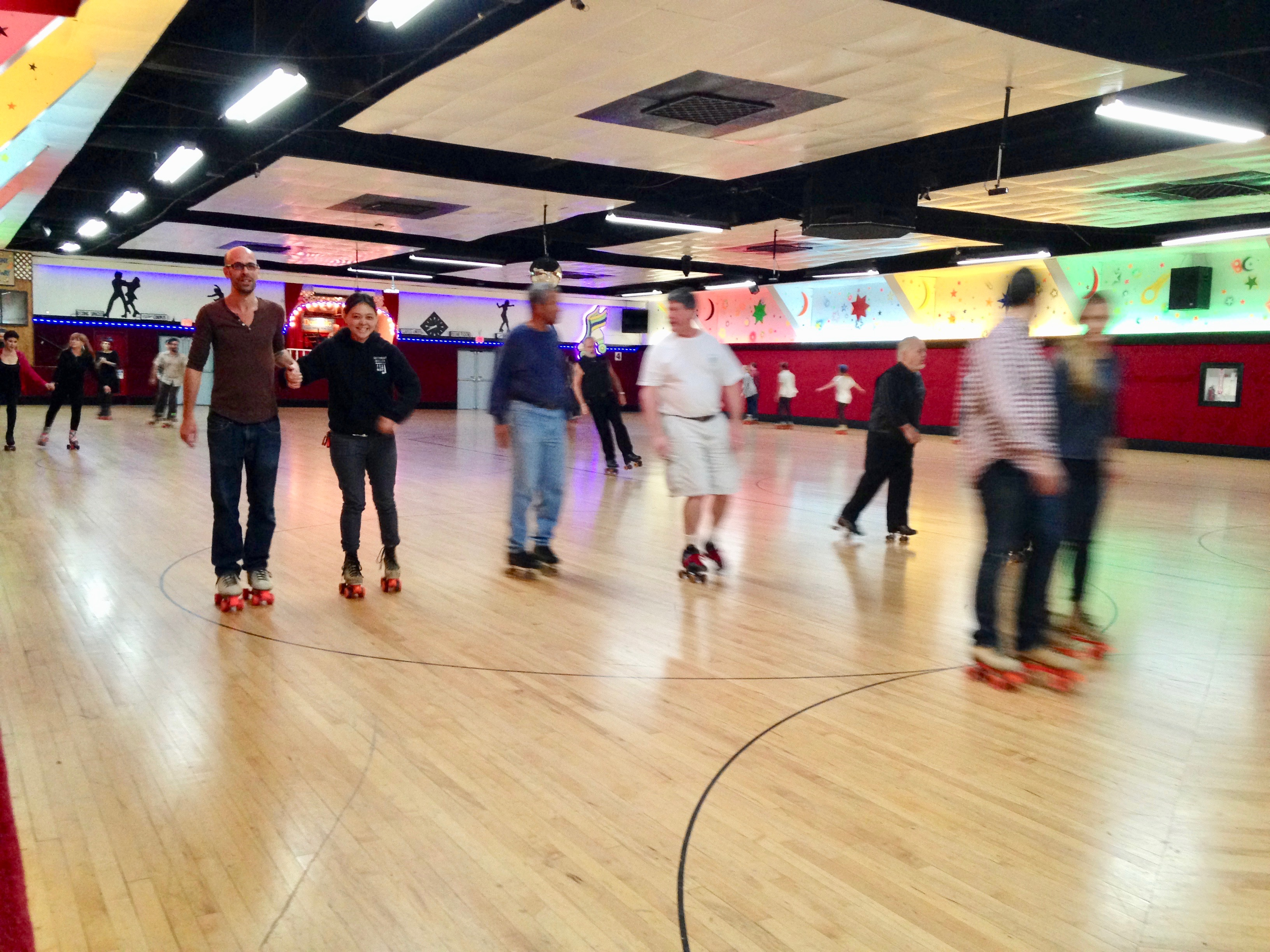
Moonlight Rollerway was used as a filming location for the episode.

Moonlight Rollerway in Glendale, California was featured in the episode as the place where Lexi, Rue and Jules go roller skating together. Speaking on her scenes with Elordi in an behind-the-scenes video uploaded to Euphoria's YouTube channel, Demie said that "working with Jacob was incredible. I couldn't have asked for a better scene partner. Those scenes are really intense, and you know, it is- it's acting, but it's physical and you know, you're pouring all of your emotion into this." In an interview with Wonderland, Demie spoke of preparing herself mentally on set before portraying the script's heavy scenes: "I would be alone before [those] scenes and listen to certain songs and think back to my past – you know, being a child and seeing a dysfunctional couple in my home and trying to justify why she would stay and allow this [...] Being vulnerable and allowing that was really something that was very difficult for me and I think most of it was me trying to have compassion for Maddy."

=== Music ===
The beat drops on Billie Eilish's song "You Should See Me in a Crown" after Kat says "There’s nothing more powerful than a fat girl who doesn’t give a fuck." At the roller rink, "Run the Road" by Santigold plays.

== Reception ==
=== Ratings ===
Viewership and ratings per episode of '03 Bonnie and Clyde
No.	Title	Air date	Rating/share (18–49)	Viewers (millions)	DVR (18–49)	DVR viewers (millions)	Total (18–49)	Total viewers (millions)
5	"'03 Bonnie and Clyde"	July 14, 2019	0.21	0.579	0.13	0.289	0.34	0.868

=== Critical reviews ===
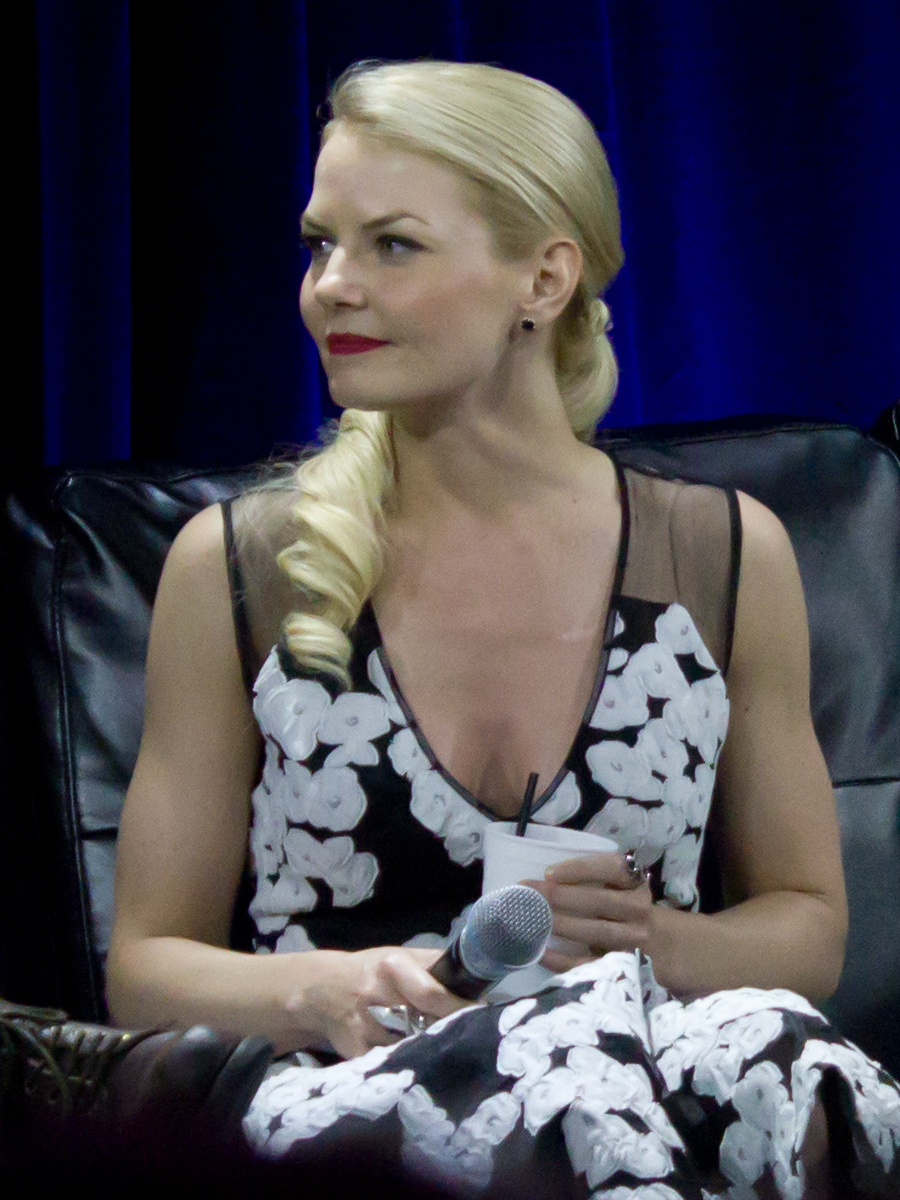
Jennifer Morrison's direction of "'03 Bonnie and Clyde" received praise.

In a ranking of the first two seasons and specials, BuzzFeed listed "'03 Bonnie and Clyde" at thirteen out of eighteen, writing: "Every Maddy moment is a gift and Alexa Demie steals the show in this episode." IndieWire placed it at the same number in a list which included season three's premiere "Ándale", writing that the episode "steers the entire cast into an unsettling state of dysfunction, with Ali hinting that Rue and Jules getting together might not actually be a good thing. More tonally cohesive than anything in season 2, it’s an essential bridge... but still the weakest of season 1." Refinery29's Ariana Romero wrote: "[The episode] may be the most intense episode of Euphoria yet [...] However, what you find in the hour is some of Euphoria's most thoughtful and understandably painful work." Romero commended the episode's "traumatizing and visceral representation of abuse", and spoke positively of Demie's portrayal as Maddy. Allie Pape of Vulture gave the episode a 4 out of 5 stars, writing: "Collectively, the episode paints a picture of a group of people so desperate to live up to their ideas of their imagined selves that they're willing to endanger their real ones, whether through casual sex or flinging themselves back into the arms of abusers."

=== Accolades ===
The episode was Euphoria composer Labrinth's submission at the 72nd Primetime Creative Arts Emmy Awards, leading him to a nomination for the Primetime Emmy Award for Outstanding Music Composition for a Series (Original Dramatic Score).
