= A Thousand Little Trees of Blood =

- Euphoria episode
- Rue Bennett succeeds eating a Jolly Rancher.
- Episode no.: Season 2 Episode 6
- Directed by: Sam Levinson
- Written by: Sam Levinson
- Cinematography by: Rina Yang
- Editing by: Laura Zempel
- Original air date: February 13, 2022
- Running time: 60 minutes

Guest appearances
- Minka Kelly as Samantha; Alanna Ubach as Suze Howard; Paula Marshall as Marsha Jacobs; Tyler Chase as Custer; Zak Steiner as Aaron Jacobs; Colman Domingo as Ali Muhamand

Episode chronology
← Previous "Stand Still Like the Hummingbird"	Next → "The Theater and Its Double"
- Euphoria season 2

"A Thousand Little Trees of Blood" is the sixth episode of the second season of the American teen drama television series Euphoria. The episode was written and directed by series creator Sam Levinson. It originally aired on HBO on February 13, 2022, and received generally positive reviews. The title of this episode is a reference to the 1928 poem "The Martyrdom Of Saint Eulalia" by Spanish poet and playwright Federico García Lorca.

The episode's cold open portrays Rue Bennett (Zendaya) making amends with her sponsor Ali Muhamand (Colman Domingo). In the episode proper, Nate Jacobs (Jacob Elordi) searches for his father's sex tape with Jules Vaughn (Hunter Schafer), which leads him to violently threaten his ex-girlfriend Maddy Perez (Alexa Demie), who stole the disc.

== Plot ==
Suffering from drug withdrawal, Rue Bennett (Zendaya) is unable to open a Jolly Rancher. She decides to call her sponsor Ali Muhamand (Colman Domingo) to apologize; he accepts. Emotional and relieved, Rue finds the strength to unwrap the candy and eat it. Rue's mother Leslie (Nika King) invites Ali to dinner, where Ali reaffirms to Rue's sister Gia (Storm Reid) that it is okay to be angry with Rue.

Nate Jacobs (Jacob Elordi) finds himself feeling relieved that his father Cal Jacobs (Eric Dane) is no longer in his life. Nate's mother Marsha (Paula Marshall) tells him he used to be a sweet boy before suddenly experiencing a dark change in personality. Ethan Daley (Austin Abrams) voices annoyance at Kat Hernandez's (Barbie Ferreira) recent lack of interest in him. When Kat gives Ethan a series of lies as a reason to end their relationship, he breaks up with her.

Samantha (Minka Kelly), the woman who Maddy Perez (Alexa Demie) babysits for, has a conversation with Maddy at her swimming pool, where she admits to having an affair with her best friend's ex-boyfriend in high school, like Cassie Howard (Sydney Sweeney). Samantha assures Maddy she will eventually find the one who'll treat her right. In a flashback, Cassie's sister Lexi (Maude Apatow) and drug dealer Fezco O'Neill (Angus Cloud) hold hands after watching Stand by Me.

Custer tells his girlfriend Faye Valentine (Chloe Cherry) that he is a police informant. Nate breaks into Maddy's bedroom and points Cal's revolver at her. Maddy initially feigns ignorance about her knowledge of Cal's recordings. Nate loads a single bullet into the gun and plays Russian roulette with himself as Maddy begs him to stop, before confessing to the location of the disk. Nate says the game was a joke and leaves with the recording.

On the drive home, Nate calls Cassie and meets with Jules Vaughn (Hunter Schafer), apologizing for everything he did to her; the two admit the feelings they expressed to each other by text message the previous year were genuine. Nate gives to Jules the sex tape of her and Cal. Later, Jules watches the video.

Gia is skeptical when Rue states that she wants to get sober. Gia asks Ali if he thinks Rue will get clean, and Ali responds that he does not know. The two sisters share a bed for the night. As they sleep, Leslie gets on the phone with the hospital to readmit Rue back to drug rehabilitation. Leslie learns no inpatient facility has room for Rue and breaks down, fearing Rue will kill herself without treatment.

== Production ==
=== Writing ===
II. The Martyrdom

Naked, Flora goes
up the little stairs of water.
For the breasts of Eulalia
the Consul demands a platter.
A jet of green veins
bursts from her throat.
Her sex trembles, disarrayed
like a bird in a thicket.
On the ground, unruly,
her severed hands writhe,
still crossed in a feeble
decapitated prayer.
And through the red holes
where once were her breasts,
tiny skies are now seen
and rivulets of white milk.
A thousand little trees of blood
cover all her back,
and oppose their moist trunks
to the scalpel of the fire.
Yellow centurions, grey-fleshed,
and sleepless in their harness,
reach the sky, clashing
the silver of their armor.
And as a passion of manes and swords
is shaking in confusion,
the Consul bears on a platter
the smoky breasts of Eulalia.

— Federico García Lorca, 1928

A line from the second verse of the 1928 poem "The Martyrdom Of Saint Eulalia" by Spanish poet, playwright, and theatre director Federico García Lorca is the origin of the episode's title. This name was chosen to parallel Rue and Eulalia of Barcelona, whose crucifixion the poem is about. In a behind-the-scenes video uploaded to Euphoria's YouTube channel, series creator and writer Sam Levinson spoke about his screenplay for the episode: "The narrative arc of Euphoria has always been about this search for forgiveness or redemption that comes out of that. If this show is gonna be honest about addiction, it needs to be honest about the lines that you cross, that you feel like you can never come back from."

=== Filming ===
Star Zendaya celebrated her twenty fifth birthday on the set of this episode. Her character Rue wears a Malcolm X t-shirt in the episode, this is a reference to the conversation she had with Ali had in the 2020 special episode "Trouble Don't Last Always", where Rue said "I don't know. Maybe I'll... start a revolution like Malcolm X or something." The second half of season 2 was also broadcast in Black History Month.

British-Korean cinematographer Rina Yang worked on the episode, she spoke to W on the experience: "The entire Euphoria crew had been working together for a few years: They did the first season, the Christmas special, the film Malcolm & Marie. It’s always a bit nerve-racking dropping in as a guest DP on a well-established team, but they were so welcoming. Sam directed my episode, which was one of the most inspiring and satisfying experiences I’ve had, because he’s a great DP himself. He’s got such an eye for visuals, and a consideration for lighting and how the camera moves. No matter how talented your actors are, if you can’t create the mood and capture the performance in the best way, the product is half as good."

=== Music ===
"Stairway to the Stars" by Jazz saxophonist, composer, and bandleader Dexter Gordon plays while Ali and Gia cook together.

== Reception ==
=== Ratings ===
According to Nielsen Media Research, upon airing "A Thousand Little Trees of Blood" was watched by 283,000 people. They estimated that 0.11% of the total 18-49 population in the US was tuning in. Including stats from HBO's streaming service Max, the episode drew 5,100,000 viewers on its first day of release, higher than any previous episode, a 20% rise from "Stand Still Like the Hummingbird", and surpassing the season 2 average by 45%. This was despite competition with that Sunday's main attraction, Super Bowl LVI.

=== Critical reviews ===
Review aggregator website Rotten Tomatoes gives the episode an approval score of 88%, based on 8 critical reviews. In a ranking of the first two seasons and specials, BuzzFeed listed "A Thousand Little Trees of Blood" at sixteen out of eighteen, writing: "The definition of a piece-moving episode, this is another late-in-the-season finale setup piece. Nothing much of consequence happens although everyone seems in a lot of anguish hoping something will change for them. Cassie and Lexi's mom emerges as a real MVP here [...] but otherwise there is little forward momentum." IndieWire placed it at the same number in a list which included season three's premiere "Ándale", writing that "there’s a sliver of real character development in this episode that feels too little too late after an exhausting and unfocused season 2 start. But it does allow the actors space to show their chops and fleshes out several neglected characters. Mothers receive an overdue spotlight here, between Suze (Alanna Ubach) giving Cassie some tough love and Nate’s mother Marsha (Paula Marshall) expressing her deep-seated resentments to her son. Plus, Leslie (Nika King) closes out the hour by begging a rehabilitation center to save Rue’s life. Of course, there are major missteps here, too. Nate pulling a gun on Maddy is gratuitous, and the ridiculous breakup scene between Kat and Ethan (Austin Abrams) underlines the lack of direction for her character. Even still, this is the sort of entry Euphoria season 2 needed more of."

In a four out of five star review, The Independent wrote that "by some miracle, episode six opens with Rue sitting at her family dining table. Not that we’re complaining or anything – if Euphoria has taught us anything, it's to be grateful for every crumb of hope this show deigns to give us." Rating the episode a C for The A.V. Club, Michael-Michelle Pratt described the episode as taking "a closer look at what the Bennett family—not just Rue—has endured [...] This week’s episode was not as immersive or poignant as the previous one. Though it wasn’t fully formed, I could see the theme of familial pain developing. But I’m glad that Rue’s support system has all become one unit."
