= The Trials and Tribulations of Trying to Pee While Depressed =

- Euphoria episode
- Rue Bennett as a hardboiled detective.
- Episode no.: Season 1 Episode 7
- Directed by: Sam Levinson
- Written by: Sam Levinson
- Cinematography by: Adam Newport-Berra
- Editing by: Harry Yoon
- Original air date: July 28, 2019
- Running time: 59 minutes

Guest appearances
- Alanna Ubach as Suze Howard; Keean Johnson as Daniel Dimarco; Nat Faxon as Rick; Tyler Chase as Custer; Nick Blood as Gus Howard; Lukas Gage as Tyler Clarkson; John Ales as David Vaughn; Bobbi Salvör Menuez as TC; Quintessa Swindell as Anna; Shamari Maurice as Harris

Episode chronology
← Previous "The Next Episode"	Next → "And Salt the Earth Behind You"
- Euphoria season 1

"The Trials and Tribulations of Trying to Pee While Depressed" is the seventh episode of the first season of the American teen drama television series Euphoria. The episode was written and directed by series creator Sam Levinson. It originally aired on HBO on July 28, 2019 and received highly positive reviews.

The episode's cold open introduces Cassie Howard's (Sydney Sweeney) childhood ice skating dreams being dashed when her father abandons her family. In the episode proper, Rue Bennett (Zendaya) falls into a psychotic depression leading her to avoid peeing, as referenced in the title of the episode. Meanwhile her girlfriend, Jules Vaughn (Hunter Schafer) heads for the city.

== Plot ==
As a child, Cassie Howard (Sydney Sweeney) takes part in competitive ice skating, but the career fizzles out due to financial issues and her parents' divorce. After being involved in a traffic collision, Cassie's father Gus (Nick Blood) descends into drug addiction and poverty and abandons the family. As a teenager, Cassie enters many exploitative sexual relationships until she meets Chris McKay (Algee Smith). In the present, Cassie takes a positive pregnancy test.

Rue Bennett (Zendaya) falls into a psychotic depression. She watches hours of Love Island, unmotivated to leave her bed, causing her bladder to shut down. Tyler Clarkson (Lukas Gage) is imprisoned while Rue visualizes herself as a film noir hardboiled detective on a mission with Cassie's younger sister Lexi (Maude Apatow) to find out what happened between Rue's girlfriend, Jules Vaughn (Hunter Schafer), and Nate Jacobs (Jacob Elordi). Eventually, the two figure out that Nate has framed Tyler for assault, threatening Jules to act as a legal eyewitness on his behalf.

During a friend meetup, Maddy Perez (Alexa Demie) warns Cassie not to tell McKay about her affair with Daniel Dimarco (Keean Johnson). When Kat Hernandez (Barbie Ferreira) chimes in with a dismissive comment, Maddy chastises her newfound personality, causing Kat to storm out in tears. Rue has trouble adjusting to Rick (Nat Faxon), her mother Leslie's (Nika King) new boyfriend. At Fezco O'Neill (Angus Cloud)'s apartment, Rue imagines pill bottles begging her to take them.

As her relationship with Rue sours, Jules takes a train to Los Angeles. She reunites with her old friend TC (Bobbi Salvör Menuez), who introduces Jules to their roommate Anna (Quintessa Swindell). Cassie tells McKay she's pregnant; the two discuss the effects this will have on their future, with McKay advising that they are both not ready to become parents. As a webcam model, Kat has an uneasy conversation with someone using a black screen and a voice changer, and she immediately decides to end the session when she becomes uncomfortable.

Fezco confronts Nate, threatening to harm him if he keeps messing with Rue and her friends. Rue develops urinary tract infection, while Jules, Anna and TC go clubbing and take psychedelic drugs. As Anna and Jules have oral sex, Jules hallucinates about both Nate and Rue. That evening, the police get a tip-off from Nate and arrive at Fezco's, forcing Fezco and Ashtray (Javon Walton) to flush all of their gear. Rue is found lying in a heap on the floor by Leslie, who helps her up and bathes her. The next morning, Jules texts Rue, telling her that she missed her.

== Production ==
=== Writing ===
The tangent sequence in the episode where Rue acts out being a 1920s or 30s hardboiled detective, which also references Morgan Freeman in Seven (1995), was compared to Charlie Kelly mental ward conspiracy scene in It's Always Sunny in Philadelphia.

=== Filming ===
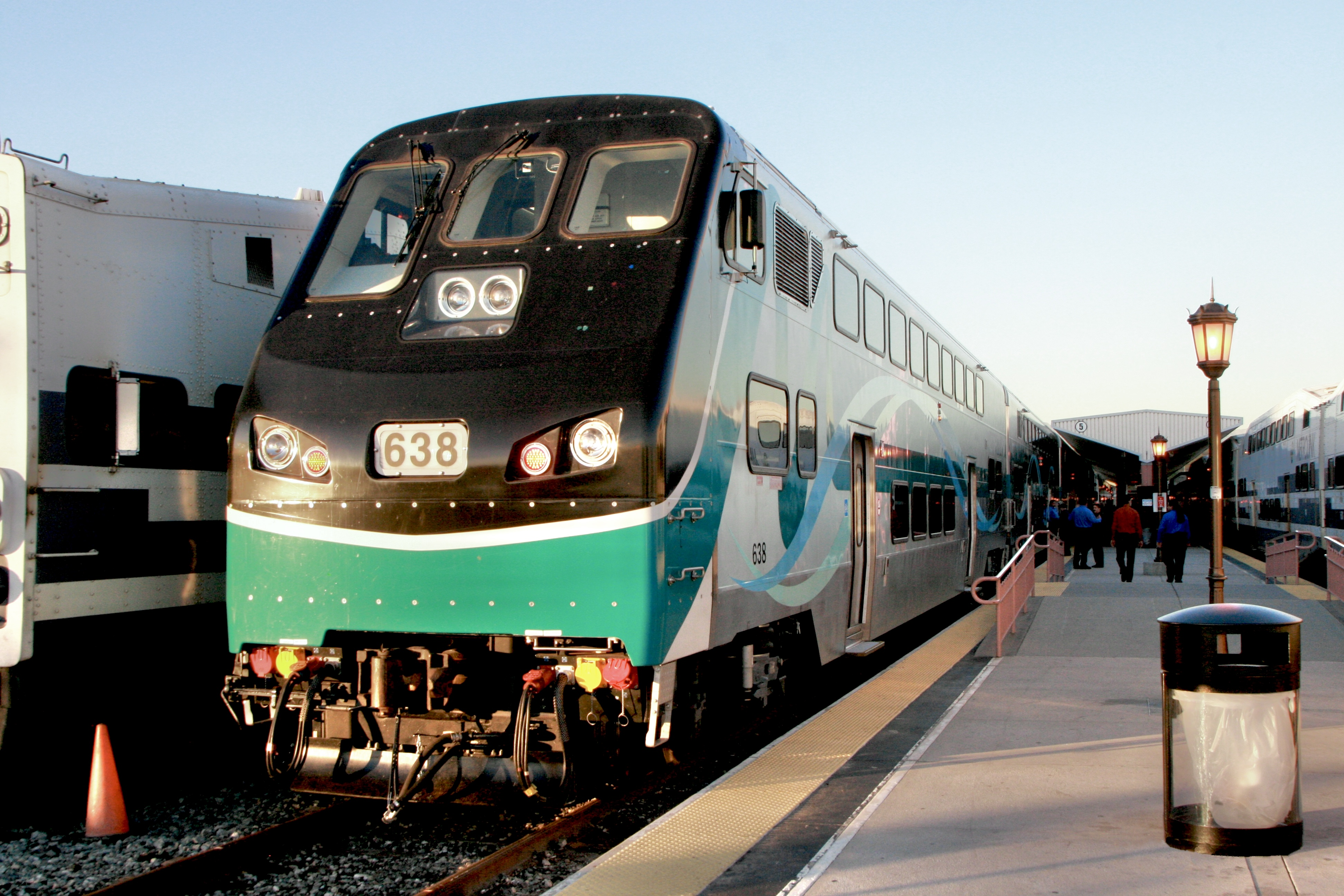
Los Angeles Union Station was used as a filming location for the episode.

Location shooting for Jules train journey took place at Los Angeles Union Station. In an behind-the-scenes video uploaded to Euphoria's YouTube channel, Cassie's actress Sweeney spoke about creating her character: "Before we went into filming, I actually got to sit down and build Cassie's character book. That is an interactive timeline diary of her entire life, and so, something that happened when she was two with her dad will create how she reacts when she opens her ice skating present".

=== Music ===
The start of the episode is set to "Didn't I (Blow Your Mind This Time)" by The Delfonics. While Rue lies in bed watching Love Island, "Mr. Sandman" by The Chordettes plays. "Be Mine" by Amandla Stenberg plays over Jules' journey to meet TC and Anna. "Every Single Night" by Fiona Apple plays over the closing credits.

== Reception ==
=== Ratings ===
Viewership and ratings per episode of The Trials and Tribulations of Trying to Pee While Depressed
No.	Title	Air date	Rating/share (18–49)	Viewers (millions)	DVR (18–49)	DVR viewers (millions)	Total (18–49)	Total viewers (millions)
7	"The Trials and Tribulations of Trying to Pee While Depressed"	July 28, 2019	0.19	0.549	0.13	0.297	0.32	0.846

=== Critical reviews ===
TVLine gave a "Performer of the Week" honorable mention to Sweeney on August 3, 2019 for her work in this episode. The site wrote "of all the angsty teenage tales on HBO's Euphoria, Cassie's might be the most poignant of all [...] a wild rush of mixed emotions — fear, excitement, shame, hope — was written across Sweeney's face as she confided in her boyfriend McKay. She just wants to be loved, whether it's by a boyfriend or a baby, and that intensely relatable desire lies at the heart of Sweeney's impressive work here." In a ranking of the first two seasons and specials, BuzzFeed listed "The Trials and Tribulations of Trying to Pee While Depressed" at the last out of eighteen, writing: "Euphoria can traffic in some pretty depressing material, but this penultimate episode from the first season is really giving us nothing but misery. [...] All in all, this is mostly a set-up episode for the season 1 finale without many iconic moments or levity." IndieWire placed it in eighth in a list which included season three's premiere "Ándale", writing that it was "anyone who has ever indulged in bed rotting (particularly with an overheating laptop auto-playing Love Island) can appreciate this Euphoria season 1 episode for its refreshingly honest take on mental illness." They added that "the rushed abortion plotline" in the episode "underscores how unevenly the show handled its ensemble overall."

Black Nerd Problems' Aisha Jordan commended the episode's cinematography as "a perfect visual explanation of depression." Ariana Romero of Refinery29 wrote that "every episode of Euphoria season 1 has been named after a hip-hop song. That is until Sunday night's "The Trials and Tribulations of Trying to Pee While Depressed," the penultimate installment of the HBO hit's 2019 run. [...] "Trying to Pee While Depressed," is also the longest episode of the season by a long shot — for good reason. [...] Let's figure out what's really going on before this wild, terrifying ride comes to an end."

Vice's Alex Wexelman wrote that the episode was "honest about the painful, unglamorous realities of depression". He compared Rue to BoJack Horseman, writing that "Rue's plight spoke to me directly in a way that BoJack Horseman and other shows lauded for their depiction of mental health frustratingly get wrong, or even stigmatize." Allie Pape at Vulture gave the episode a four out of five, writing that "Euphoria increasingly feels like it's bifurcating into two shows. There's the story of the misfits — Rue, Jules, and Fezco — which, despite its flaws, has aspects that feel urgent and original. And then there's the story of everyone else, which has grown plodding and predictable. Unfortunately, the thread tying the two stories together is Nate, a cartoon villain who's completely lost what little dimensionality he had in the show's initial episodes. Every time a Rue or Jules story line manages to gain some narrative velocity, Nate inevitably shows up to drag it back down to earth."

=== Accolades ===
Kay Lee's production design in this episode and the next was honored at the Art Directors Guild Awards 2019 with a nomination for Excellence in Production Design for a One-Hour Contemporary Single-Camera Series.
