= Faye Valentine =

Faye Valentine may refer to:

- A character from the anime series Cowboy Bebop (1998)
- A character from the teen drama series Euphoria (2019)
