= Rain or Shine (Euphoria) =

- Euphoria episode
- Maddy Perez and Cassie Jacobs react to Nate's death.
- Episode no.: Season 3 Episode 7
- Directed by: Sam Levinson
- Written by: Sam Levinson
- Editing by: Nikola Boyanov; Aaron I. Butler; Andy Cruz; Aleshka Ferrero; Julio C. Perez IV
- Original air date: May 24, 2026
- Running time: 77 minutes

Guest appearances
- Sharon Stone as Patricia Lance; Rosalía as Magick; Marshawn Lynch as G; Rebecca Pidgeon as Ms. Penzler; James Landry Hébert as Harley; Hemky Madera as Jimenez; Kadeem Hardison as Big Eddy; Natasha Lyonne as Hooker; Colman Domingo as Ali Muhammad; Zak Steiner as Aaron Jacobs; Anna Van Patten as Kitty; Homer Gere as Dylan Reid; Jack Topalian as Naz; Matt Willig as Artur

Episode chronology
| ← Previous "Stand Still and See" | Next → "In God We Trust" |
- Euphoria season 3

"Rain or Shine" is the seventh episode of the third season of the American psychological drama television series Euphoria. The episode was written and directed by series creator Sam Levinson. It originally aired on HBO on May 24, 2026, and received positive reviews. The title of the episode is a reference to the 1959 song "Come Rain or Come Shine" by American jazz pianist Bill Evans.

The episode's cold open introduces Ali Muhammad (Colman Domingo) becoming sober, and losing all of his twelve-step program sponsors. In the episode proper, Maddy Perez (Alexa Demie) becomes indebted to Alamo Brown (Adewale Akinnuoye-Agbaje) after he helps her save Cassie Jacobs (Sydney Sweeney) life; in the process Nate (Jacob Elordi) dies. Meanwhile, Rue Bennett (Zendaya) infiltrates Laurie's (Martha Kelly) drug trade.

== Plot ==
Years earlier, Martin McQueen (Colman Domingo) is a crack cocaine addict who abused his wife and cheated on her with a prostitute (Natasha Lyonne). After having a heart attack, he becomes sober, joins the twelve-step program, converts to Islam and changes his name in honor of his hero, Muhammad Ali. During the COVID-19 pandemic, many of the Narcotics Anonymous addicts who Ali sponsors commit suicide due to the isolation.

In the present, Rue Bennett (Zendaya) visits Lexi Howard (Maude Apatow), who is annoyed by Rue's incessant belief that she has found God after her car crash, causing her to say Rue's mother cutting her off is deserved. Rue notices someone watching her in the apartment of Lexi's sister Cassie Jacobs (Sydney Sweeney) and goes to investigate, but narrowly avoids getting shot by Artur (Matt Willig), who is holding her hostage.

Earlier, at the behest of network executives, Patricia Lance (Sharon Stone) removes Cassie from LA Nights. Ms. Penzler (Rebecca Pidgeon) fires Maddy Perez (Alexa Demie) for getting Cassie cast. Maddy slaps Cassie after learning she deleted her OnlyFans account, but agrees to retain her as a client as long as she follows orders. She sets Cassie up with popular actor Dylan Reid. At her apartment, Cassie gets Dylan drunk, takes a selfie with him, and they have sex. While he leaves the room, she takes his phone and uploads the photo to Instagram. The next morning, Cassie has gained 100,000 subscribers. Meanwhile, her husband Nate (Jacob Elordi) is buried alive by Naz.

Later, Rue tells Ali she plans to go to a Texas farmstead she visited after taking down Laurie (Martha Kelly). Ali unsuccessfully attempts to dissuade her. The next morning, G (Marshawn Lynch) drives Rue to Laurie's property and waits with a sniper rifle. Rue fakes an injury, and tells Laurie Alamo Brown (Adewale Akinnuoye-Agbaje) gave it to her.

In a coffin under his construction site, Nate screams for help, attracting a rattlesnake that slithers down his breathing pipe and bites him. Laurie, her cousin Wayne (Toby Wallace), his girlfriend Faye Valentine (Chloe Cherry), and his father Harley (James Landry Hébert) celebrate. Naz makes Cassie call Maddy to procure one million dollars. During a tense confrontation, Wayne slashes Rue's palm with a knife. Maddy implores Alamo to help her make a deal with Naz to save Nate and Cassie, during which she inadvertently suggests that Rue works for the Drug Enforcement Administration, which she learned from Lexi. She has a sensual hot tub encounter with Alamo in order to persuade him to help her.

At Nate's burial site, Alamo and Maddy meet with Naz and Artur. They trade a bag of money for Cassie, but when Naz discovers it is empty, Alamo shoots and kills him. Alamo makes Artur dig up Nate's coffin, while telling Maddy she is forever indebted to him. Cassie and Maddy open the coffin to find Nate's corpse. Rue attempts to steal the money from Laurie's safe for Alamo with Faye's help, but Faye changes her mind after finding the safe empty and screams Wayne's name.

== Production ==
=== Writing ===
The version of "Come Rain or Come Shine" recorded in 1959 by American jazz pianist Bill Evans for his 1960 album Portrait in Jazz. This name was chosen to parallel a line from Ali in the episode. It also symbolises the strong friendship bond between Maddy Perez and Cassie Jacobs. Rattlesnake bites usually take two to three days to kill people, whereas Nate's death takes place over a shorter amount of time.

=== Filming ===
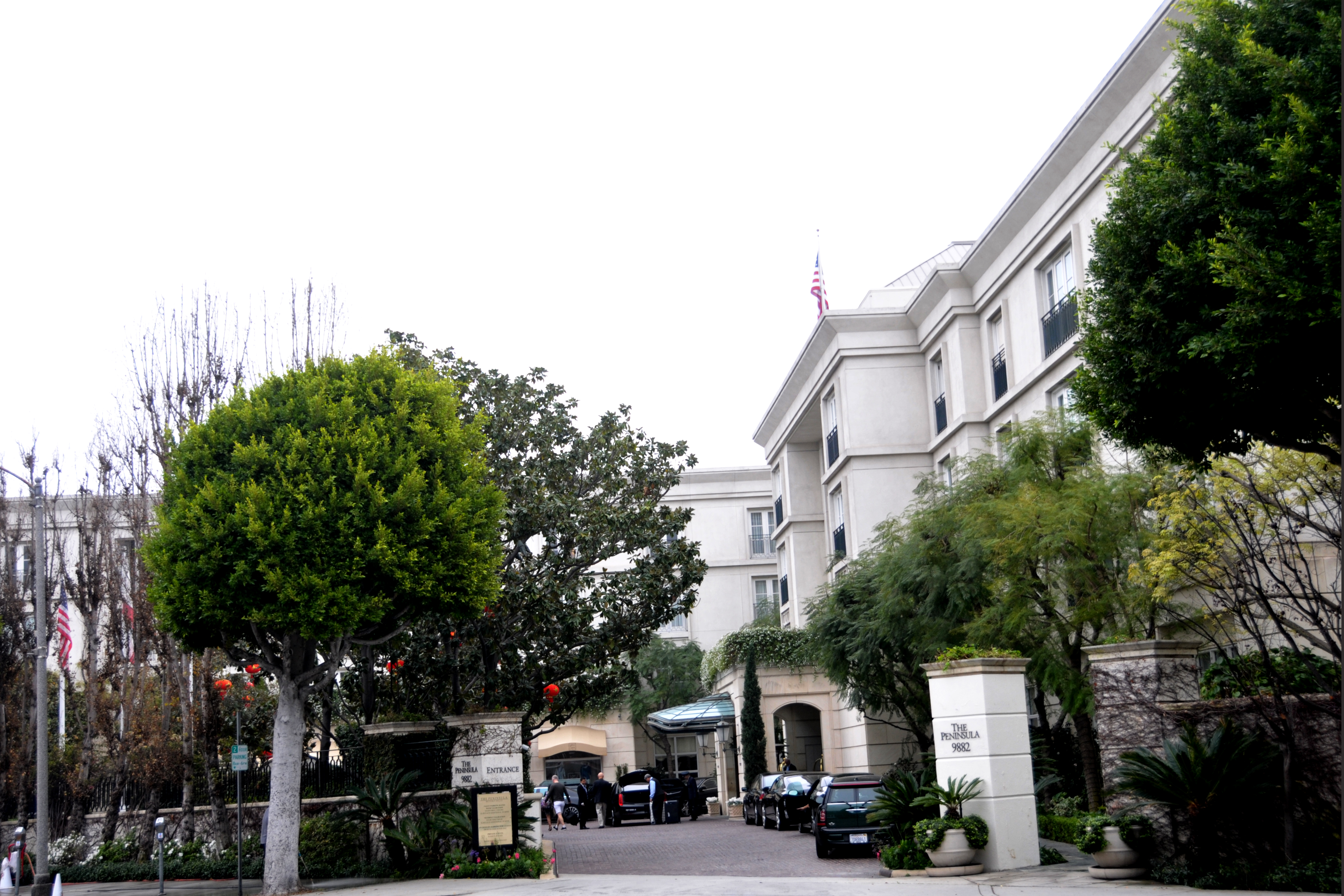
The Peninsula Beverly Hills was used as a filming location for the episode.

Location shooting for the church where Ali's Narcotics Anonymous meeting is cancelled took place at New Life Community Church in Lincoln Heights, Los Angeles. The restaurant Cassie meets Dylan at was filmed at The Peninsula Beverly Hills on Wilshire Boulevard. Lyonne's cameo stemmed from her friendship with Domingo and series creator Sam Levinson which started at a private dinner for Domingo's film Rustin.

For Nate's death scene, a boa constrictor with a fake rattler stuck to its tail was used for safety. Elordi said of the snake that "he was, like, real cuddly, so he just saddled up next to me, and it was nice. But he was real sleepy. I had to kind of nudge him to get him to come up." Stunt coordinator Jeff Barnett explained that while Elordi was in the coffin, which he could not move his arms in, "We were just making sure he had oxygen, he was comfortable. Minimal time in the coffin." Marco Solis was production's snake wrangler, who also worked with Little Bitch, the rattlesnake used for exterior shots. Alexa Demie said she was "freezing" during filming for the reveal of Nate's death, as it was 4 a.m. and she had nothing more to wear than her dress.

=== Music ===
Cassie getting Dylan drunk in her apartment is set to "Sex and Candy" by Marcy Playground. Steely Dan's song "Do It Again" plays over a montage that starts with Ali and Rue talking on the couch and ends when Rue arrives at Laurie's property. "Entrance Of The Devil" by Zior plays when Nate's corpse is revealed. Louis Armstrong's version of "Go Down Moses" plays over the closing credits.

== Reception ==
=== Ratings ===
According to Nielsen Media Research, upon airing "Rain or Shine" was watched by 308,000 people. They estimated that 0.08% of the total 18-49 population in the US was tuning in. "Rain or Shine" remains the highest rated episode of Euphoria Season 3, with an IMDb score of 7.7/10

=== Critical reviews ===
In a B− review for The A.V. Club, Emma Fraser wrote that "the snakes bare their fangs as the penultimate Euphoria hints at more death to come [...] Last week, Lexi’s friend Gillie observed what a TV show needs for viewers to stick around for the next episode: 'If someone doesn’t die periodically, people get bored.' What read as foreshadowing then comes to pass now for Nate". In a two out of five star review for Vulture, Rafaela Bassili wrote "At over 70 minutes, "Rain or Shine" at least begins with that more novelistic tone. We get another vintage Euphoria backstory, this time detailing Ali's road to recovery." Jen Chaney of Elle wrote about Rue's portrayal in the episode: "This episode of Euphoria ultimately asks us to question whether Rue deserves redemption. Maybe this is my admiration of Zendaya talking, but I believe she does. I also believe just as strongly that she won’t get it. It’s too easy to imagine Ali adding her name to his so-called 'book of the dead,' his 'reminder of how the story of addiction often ends.'" The episode's portrayal of villain Alamo making fun of Kadeem Hardison's character Big Eddy's ostomy system was criticized by people with stoma bags on social media.
