= America My Dream =

- Euphoria episode
- Jules Vaughn reunites with Rue Bennett.
- Episode no.: Season 3 Episode 2
- Directed by: Sam Levinson
- Written by: Sam Levinson
- Cinematography by: Marcell Rév
- Editing by: Nikola Boyanov; Aaron I. Butler; Aleshka Ferrero; Julio C. Perez IV
- Original air date: April 19, 2026
- Running time: 60 minutes

Guest appearances
- Priscilla Delgado as Angel Martinez; Rosalía as Magick; Marshawn Lynch as G; Darrell Britt-Gibson as Bishop; James Landry Hébert as Harley; Rebecca Pidgeon as Ms. Penzler; Kadeem Hardison as Big Eddy; Homer Gere as Dylan Reid; Jeff Wahlberg as Brandon Fontaine; Cailyn Rice as Vivian; Jessica Blair Herman as Heather; Bella Podaras as Katelyn Adreans; Jack Topalian as Naz

Episode chronology
← Previous "Ándale"	Next → "The Ballad of Paladin"
- Euphoria season 3

"America My Dream" is the second episode of the third season of the American psychological drama television series Euphoria. The episode was written and directed by series creator Sam Levinson. It originally aired on HBO on April 19, 2026 and received mostly mixed reviews.

The episode's cold open depicts former teenager Maddy Perez (Alexa Demie), in the years after graduation, becoming a talent manager's assistant whose career is stalled by the COVID-19 pandemic. In the episode proper, Rue Bennett (Zendaya) begins working for Alamo Brown (Adewale Akinnuoye-Agbaje). Meanwhile, Maddy agrees to manage her ex-best friend Cassie Howard's (Sydney Sweeney) OnlyFans.

== Plot ==
After graduating in 2019, Maddy Perez (Alexa Demie) moves to Los Angeles and immediately gets a job as an assistant to talent manager Ms. Penzler (Rebecca Pidgeon). When the COVID-19 pandemic hits, Maddy coaches influencer Katelyn Adreans into starting an OnlyFans. Penzler forces Maddy to drop Katelyn when she starts dating an actor under their company, Dylan Reid. By 2021, Katelyn is making $700,000 a month.

In 2024, Rue Bennett (Zendaya) starts working for Alamo Brown (Adewale Akinnuoye-Agbaje). When Alamo informs Laurie (Martha Kelly) over the phone, she insults him by calling him a pig. Rue covers up stripper Tish's fatal overdose from fentanyl for Alamo and starts managing the floor at one of his clubs, the Silver Slipper. Although she still misses Jules Vaughn (Hunter Schafer), Rue starts a brief relationship with dancer Angel Martinez, who is shaken by Tish's disappearance. A flashback depicts Rue relapsing after being cut off by her family. In the present, Alamo mulls over Laurie's earlier comment and Rue receives her first paycheck from Big Eddy (Kadeem Hardison).

Cassie Howard (Sydney Sweeney) meets with Maddy. Cassie tries to apologize for her affair with Nate Jacobs (Jacob Elordi), despite showing no signs of remorse, and accidentally admits the goal of the meeting was to hire Maddy, who agrees. Nate, who owes a $550,000 debt to loan shark Naz, is visited by his sex offender father Cal (Eric Dane). After Angel becomes violent towards Eddy and Rue because of the constant lie that Tish ran away, Rue confesses the truth in the bathroom. The grief sends Angel spiralling into addiction. Alamo has Rue drive Angel to a drug rehabilitation center. Angel is furious about the prospect at first but eventually complies.

Nate throws a barbecue to attract investors for his end-of-life care facilities. Cassie shows her OnlyFans to fellow housewife Heather, who immediately informs her husband of the paraphilic infantilism. Nate makes Cassie delete the account when her new income stream causes doubt in his finances. Rue drops Angel off at the sketchy rehab. After Angel walks down a dark corridor into the light, Rue learns there is no paperwork. She brushes off her suspicions and leaves as an ambulance arrives to traffic her across the border. The event is watched by two Drug Enforcement Administration agents.

Cassie reveals to Nate that Maddy is invited to their wedding and is now her manager. Alamo sends a large pig to Laurie's home as retaliation. Jules receives a surprise visit from Rue at her penthouse apartment. Their conversation is marked by mutual resentment and sexual tension. Jules chides Rue for judging her sugar dating before inviting Rue to bathe with her.

== Production ==
=== Writing ===
The title of this episode is a line from the Jacobs' housekeeper Juana. In an official behind-the-scenes video uploaded to YouTube, creator, writer and director Sam Levinson spoke on the writing process of Maddy and Cassie: "Syd genuinely cracks me up. She has Cassie down to a science. It's a really fun character. Same with Maddy. She's one of my favorite characters. Maddy's hustler mentality has ignited in her a real urge to make it in this business and by whatever means necessary." In a scene set in 2020, Maddy takes pictures of Katelyn using an iPhone 16, which wasn't released until 2024.

=== Filming ===
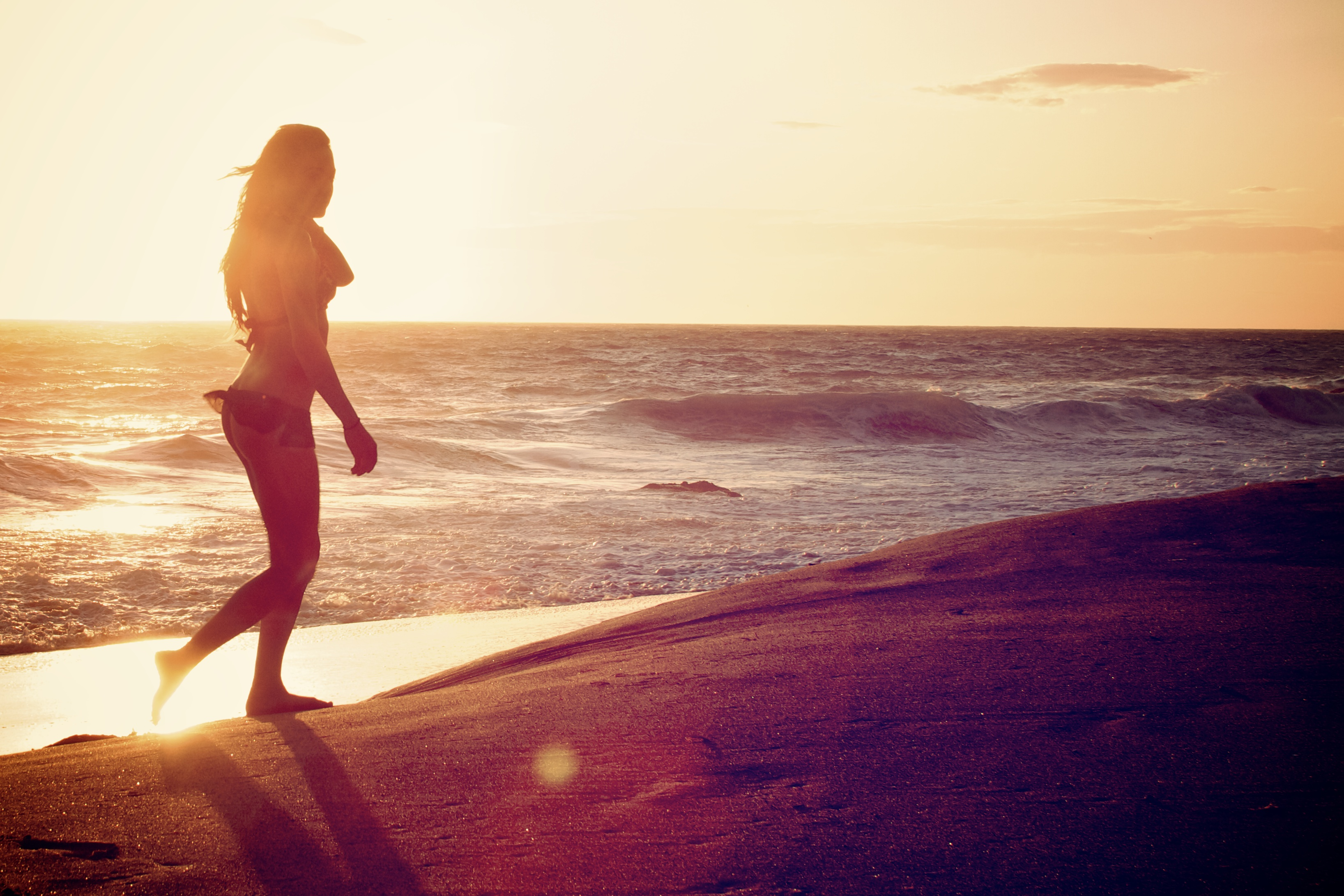
Point Dume was used as a filming location for the episode.

Location shooting for Maddy' beach photo shoot with Katelyn took place on Point Dume in Malibu, California. The exterior set of the Silver Slipper was built on top of a former liquor market in Pearblossom, California. François Audouy (production designer for season 3) spoke on the creation of the set's roof piece: "In my first interview, Sam expressed to me this vision that he had of a giant leg sticking out into the sky in the desert, it came from this great book he had of black and white photography, with a giant leg at a nightclub in 1930s Hollywood. It was great to be able to build this giant leg that looked like a roadside attraction you’d have on Route 66 - we had so many locals come by just because you could see this leg sticking up from miles away in the desert." Maddy and Cassie's poolside reunion was filmed at The Roof Garden in Santa Monica, California.

Series makeup artist Doniella Davy spoke on Jules' cosmetics, "she has a sugar daddy paying for her apartment, and her makeup needs to reflect that. Her palette has drastically changed since season one." Season 2 and 3 hair stylist Kimberly Kimble made her wig: "Sam said, 'I want Jules' hair to be 50 inches long.' I was like, 'oh wow, okay.' [...] She's like the modern-day Rapunzel. She's trapped up in the tower." Audouy added that "Sam instructed us to think about a space that was empty, like a cold, glass box." Jules' actress Schafer also wore a Balenciaga dress entirely made of bras. The episode is Dane's first posthumous appearance as Cal. Levinson spoke on filming while Dane was dying: "God bless him. I- I, I love him. You know, it's a, ALS is a really cruel disease. Eric showed up with grace and dignity and professionalism."

=== Music ===
Katelyn makes a TikTok to "Say So" by Doja Cat, a popular song on the platform during the setting of the scene, 2020. "WASSUP" by Young Miko plays while Maddy makes Katelyn's videos. Angel walking through the Silver Slipper is set to "Get It Sexyy" by Sexyy Red. "I Wanna Be Loved By You" by Marilyn Monroe plays over a montage of Cassie's Only Fans videos. Billie Holiday's cover of "Speak Low" plays in the background at Jules' penthouse apartment.

== Reception ==
=== Ratings ===
According to Nielsen Media Research, upon airing "America My Dream" was watched by 325,000 people. They estimated that 0.07% of the total 18-49 population in the US was tuning in. Including stats from HBO's streaming service Max, the episode drew 8,500,000 viewers in its first three days of release, the same number as the premiere "Ándale".

=== Critical reviews ===
The review aggregator website Metacritic, which uses a weighted average, assigned a score of 54 out of 100, based on five user ratings. In a C+ review for The A.V. Club, Emma Fraser described the episode as getting "nostalgic in an occasionally exhausting hour", writing that "feeling lost in your early twenties is not unusual. In the first two seasons of Euphoria, the teens were masquerading as adults in all aspects of their lives; now comes a push-pull between looking back at adolescence through rose-tinted glasses and figuring out who they are in the present." Josh Rosenberg of Esquire wrote of the episode that "there are few shows on TV more vulnerable to a good dunking than Sam Levinson’s high-school nuthouse. Even though his characters are all adults now, living on despite the mistakes of their past, it seems that audiences are ready to just move on. [...] But while most critics decried that Euphoria was all style over substance once again, I’m still just as determined as I was after the premiere to see this through. [...] The thing is… Euphoria hasn’t made it easy so far. This season’s idea of the American dream is scrolling on your phone for porn, and it’s tough to tell how far the series is taking it as satire or if it really believes it as some dark truth about the world." Elle's Jen Chaney criticised the episode: "Levinson is attempting to say something about Gen Z with this series- and it certainly seems like he is, though what exactly he’s saying is open to debate- part of his message is certainly that Gen Z does not care at all about selling out. They’ll say whatever they have to say and do whatever they have to do to get a leg up and an extra buck. [The episode] is saying what no other work of pop culture has ever dared to acknowledge: that Americans love money. I know, this is the first I am hearing of this also! [...] Levinson wants you to know that modern-day Los Angeles is basically the equivalent of the Wild West. You may have missed that point since the show is being so low-key about it." Priscilla Delgado's performance as Angel was praised.

One scene depicting Cassie dressed as an adult baby for her OnlyFans was criticized by both critics and supporters, with MSN writing that it "crosses the line". Conservative political commentator Megyn Kelly said the scene "seems to be wanting to bring down your defenses on the most disgusting crime imaginable on Earth." Jess Battison of LADbible Group also pointed also that ageplay is a banned category on OnlyFans and would have gotten the pictures removed and Cassie's account deactivated. Real-life OnlyFans performers criticized the portrayal of Cassie's career on the website. Alex Paige Moore told HuffPost, "Cassie’s already rich - she’s just doing it because she wants more money [...] which I think is a negative representation of the sort of girl that does only OnlyFans. [...] I feel like for a lot of people, joining OnlyFans is more of a last resort. The idea that it’s easy work, easy money - that you don’t have to do much - makes it sound like a lazy job, which it really isn’t". However, Bonnie Locket said "I actually think it’s a positive step. For a long time, there’s been a lot of stigma, and shows like this open up the conversation."
