= The Next Episode (Euphoria) =

- Euphoria episode
- Jules Vaughn reacts to Nate Jacobs' arrival.
- Episode no.: Season 1 Episode 6
- Directed by: Pippa Bianco
- Written by: Sam Levinson
- Cinematography by: Drew Daniels
- Editing by: Laura Zempel
- Original air date: July 21, 2019
- Running time: 50 minutes

Guest appearances
- Alanna Ubach as Suze Howard; Austin Abrams as Ethan Daley; Keean Johnson as Daniel Dimarco; Cranston Johnson as Frederick McKay; Paula Marshall as Marsha Jacobs; Zak Steiner as Aaron Jacobs; Lukas Gage as Tyler Clarkson

Episode chronology
← Previous "'03 Bonnie and Clyde"	Next → "The Trials and Tribulations of Trying to Pee While Depressed"
- Euphoria season 1

"The Next Episode" is the sixth episode of the first season of the American teen drama television series Euphoria. The episode was written by series creator Sam Levinson and directed by Pippa Bianco. It originally aired on HBO on July 21, 2019. The title of this episode is a reference to the 2000 song of the same name by American rapper Dr. Dre.

The episode's cold open introduces young Chris McKay (Algee Smith) as his father pressures him into a career in American football. In the episode proper, set over Halloween, McKay conflicts with his girlfriend Cassie Howard (Sydney Sweeney), as does Rue Bennett (Zendaya) with Jules Vaughn (Hunter Schafer).

"The Next Episode" received positive reviews from critics. Out of the six Primetime Emmy Award nominations received by the show for its first season, one was specifically for this episode, Outstanding Contemporary Costumes.

== Plot ==
As a child, Chris McKay (Algee Smith) is pressured by his father to be one of the many Black players in professional American football, and is advised to bottle up his emotions from a young age. In college, McKay realizes his odds of making it to the National Football League are slim. He also begins a relationship with Cassie Howard (Sydney Sweeney), but expresses discontent over rumors of her sexual history.

In the present, Rue Bennett (Zendaya) and Jules Vaughn (Hunter Schafer) attend Daniel Dimarco's (Keean Johnson) Halloween party. Rue feels left out as the only sober one, and senses that something is off with Jules, who drinks heavily. Kat Hernandez (Barbie Ferreira) has started making more money from her webcam model career, and she continues to ignore Ethan Daley (Austin Abrams) at the party. Meanwhile, Nate Jacobs (Jacob Elordi) and his family are ostracized by the community after his arrest. Nate finds solace in Maddy Perez (Alexa Demie) and continues his crusade to besmirch Jules' reputation by printing out topless photos of her, which he intends to use as blackmail.

At the Halloween party, an intoxicated Jules stumbles outside and falls in the swimming pool, prompting Rue to rescue her. Rue reconciles with Fezco O'Neill (Angus Cloud), while Cassie dances with Daniel. In a flashback to the night before, McKay invites Cassie to a Halloween party at his fraternity house; the two have sex in McKay's dorm, but they are interrupted by McKay's fraternity brothers, who violently haze and dry hump him in front of a frightened Cassie. Afterwards, McKay uncontrollably sobs in the bathroom before composing himself. He then engages in aggressive sex with Cassie, leaving her in tears.

In the present, just as McKay walks into the party, Cassie takes Daniel upstairs to have sex. When Cassie has second thoughts and refuses Daniel's advances, he harshly scolds her, sneering that she is uninteresting beyond her sexual appeal to men. Meanwhile, Ethan takes Kat to a bedroom and initiates a sexual encounter. She initially reciprocates, but ditches Ethan when he visits the bathroom. Cassie returns home and is distraught to realize that her period is late, while McKay visits his father and emotionally confides about his low chances of being drafted; his father is unsympathetic and criticizes McKay for being doubtful.

In a flashback to before the party, Nate gives Tyler Clarkson (Lukas Gage) a proposition to confess to choking Maddy, or he will send him to prison for her statutory rape, a longer sentence. Using the incriminating photos he has of her, Nate makes Jules give a false testimony to the police that she saw Tyler choke Maddy. In the present, Nate and Maddy arrive at Daniel's Halloween party; Rue becomes suspicious when she sees Jules' reaction.

== Production ==
=== Writing ===
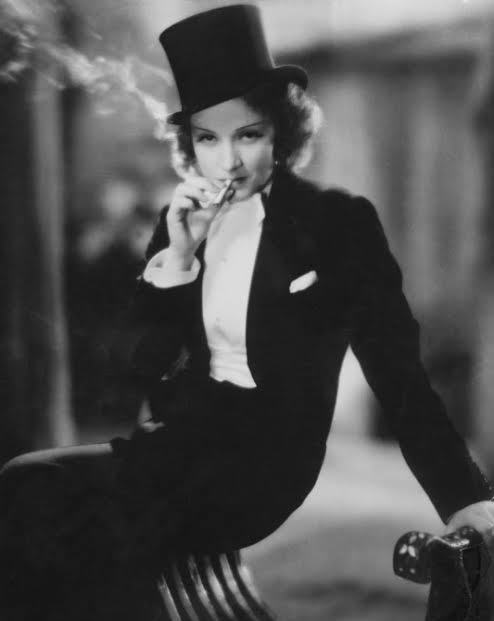
At a costume party in the episode, Rue Bennett dresses as Marlene Dietrich in Morocco (1930).

Dr. Dre's collaboration with Snoop Dogg, Kurupt, and Nate Dogg "The Next Episode", from the album of the same name is the origin of the episode's title. The Halloween costumes worn by the characters in the episode were notable. Rue dresses as Mademoiselle Amy Jolly from Morocco (1930), Lexi wears a Bob Ross costume, Maddy dresses as Iris Steensma from Taxi Driver (1976), Kat is Thana from the exploitation film Ms .45 (1981), Jules is Juliet from Romeo + Juliet (1996), and Cassie is Alabama Whitman-Worley from crime film True Romance (1993).

=== Filming ===
The episode was directed by Pippa Bianco, who had worked with HBO earlier in 2019 to make her film Share, which dealt with similar themes of sexual assault as Cassie's storyline. A day after broadcast, Smith spoke to The Hollywood Reporter on McKay's hazing in the episode, "It looks really graphic in the scene the way they edited and chopped it up, which is scary as hell, but they're play-humping and whatever and calling him "McGay." The way they made it look was very scary; I was surprised by the editing." Expanded on the filming of the scene he said "It was really cold in there because I was naked for real. Outside of being very cold, it was very dark. The way Pippa directed it, it was a private set and when they came in the room it was very intense. It lasted for a long time and was somber on set." He also spoke about the intimacy coordinator's role in the episode, "That was very beneficial. That was the first time I've had an intimacy coordinator on the set. Before we even got on set, she would come to our trailers and talk to us about everything we had to do and made sure we felt very comfortable. When we got on set, she wouldn't keep letting them do takes for no reason."

=== Music ===
"I Only Have Eyes for You" by The Flamingos plays at the start of the episode. Kat dancing as a webcam model is set to Lizzo and Missy Elliott's collaboration "Tempo". When Jules, Kat and Rue arrive at the Halloween party, "Bubblin" by Anderson .Paak is playing. Other licensed songs which play at the part are "151 Rum" by JID and "Inside-Looking Out" by The Animals. The closing credits are set to "Hot" by The Last Artful, Dodgr.

== Reception ==
=== Ratings ===
Viewership and ratings per episode of The Next Episode
No.	Title	Air date	Rating/share (18–49)	Viewers (millions)	DVR (18–49)	DVR viewers (millions)	Total (18–49)	Total viewers (millions)
6	"The Next Episode"	July 21, 2019	0.20	0.569	0.12	0.266	0.32	0.835

=== Critical reviews ===
In a ranking of the first two seasons and specials, BuzzFeed listed "The Next Episode" at seventeen of eighteen, writing: "While the Halloween costumes are incredible, this party provides fewer great moments than other Euphoria bangers." IndieWire placed it at sixth in a list which included season three's premiere "Ándale", writing that "Hunter Schafer gets bonus points for her agonizing portrayal of Jules spinning out and drunkenly reciting Shakespeare in a backyard pool. But this chapter belongs to Maude Apatow’s adorable Lexi Howard, who even years later remains TV history’s best Bob Ross impersonator."

Refinery29's Ariana Romero wrote: "Halloween does tend to bring out the very best in Euphoria's obsessions: beauty looks and teen parties. The fact that "Episode" is the second episode in a row helmed by a woman also doesn't hurt (this time, Bleed for This writer Pippa Bianco was in the director's chair.)" Allie Pape named the episode's title "perfunctory and joyless" and described it as a "retread" of episode four "Shook Ones Pt. II" in a 2 out of 5 star review for Vulture. Furthermore she wrote, "I've been trying hard to meet Euphoria where it's at for the past few weeks, hoping that the show's visual panache would eventually translate into something more for its story line. But with two episodes left to go in the season, Euphoria's bag of tricks appears completely exhausted. [...] It simply hammers on the same story lines with additional force, like it's angry about being accused of subtlety."

=== Accolades ===
The episode was Euphoria costume designers Heidi Bivens, Danielle Baker and Katina Danabassis submission at the 72nd Primetime Creative Arts Emmy Awards, leading them to a nomination for the Primetime Emmy Award for Outstanding Contemporary Costumes.
