= Stuntin' Like My Daddy (Euphoria) =

- Euphoria episode
- Nate Jacobs breaking and entering.
- Episode no.: Season 1 Episode 2
- Directed by: Sam Levinson
- Written by: Sam Levinson
- Cinematography by: Marcell Rév; André Chemetoff
- Editing by: Julio C. Perez IV
- Original air date: June 23, 2019
- Running time: 61 minutes

Guest appearances
- Alanna Ubach as Suze Howard; Austin Abrams as Ethan Daley; Keean Johnson as Daniel Dimarco; Colman Domingo as Ali Muhamand; Paula Marshall as Marsha Jacobs; Zak Steiner as Aaron Jacobs; Lukas Gage as Tyler Clarkson; John Ales as David Vaughn; Mercedes Colon as Kat's Mom; Jeremiah Birkett as Principal Hayes; Tyler Chase as Custer

Episode chronology
← Previous "Pilot"	Next → "Made You Look"
- Euphoria season 1

"Stuntin' Like My Daddy" is the second episode of the first season of the American teen drama television series Euphoria. The episode was written and directed by series creator Sam Levinson. It originally aired on HBO on June 23, 2019 and received mostly critical acclaim. The title of this episode is a reference to the 2006 song of the same name by American rappers Birdman and Lil Wayne.

The episode's cold open introduces Nate Jacobs (Jacob Elordi) discovering his father's amateur pornography collection as a child, before growing up into a teenager with anger issues that mask his sexual insecurities. In the episode proper, Rue Bennett (Zendaya) is excited about her new best friend Jules Vaughn (Hunter Schafer) on the first day of school. Meanwhile, Nate hunts down Tyler Clarkson (Lukas Gage).

== Plot ==
As a child, Nate Jacobs (Jacob Elordi) discovers his father Cal's (Eric Dane) amateur pornography. Nate is driven to perfect his body as a teen, growing up into a popular quarterback. As a teenager, Nate develops severe anger issues and extreme over protectiveness of his cheerleader girlfriend Maddy Perez (Alexa Demie).

In the present, Rue Bennett (Zendaya) spends time with Jules Vaughn (Hunter Schafer) on the first day of school, while Kat Hernandez (Barbie Ferreira) meets and bonds with her classmate Ethan Daley (Austin Abrams). In theater class, Rue breaks down when forced to talk about her summer. She runs to the bathroom to snort drugs, but is interrupted by her childhood friend Lexi Howard (Maude Apatow). Lexi attempts to comfort Rue, but Rue lashes out, causing Lexi to become emotional.

Rue reminisces about trying oxycodone for the first time at thirteen, stealing from her dying father's prescription. Kat finds out that an amateur video of her losing her virginity has been recorded by McKay's twin brothers, Roy and Troy, and uploaded to PornHub. When Kat threatens to call the police, Roy agrees to take down the video.

In the cafeteria, a pep rally for the high school football players and cheerleaders takes place. Nate offers to take Maddy out on a date while Jules and Rue cycle through an orange grove. Rue refuses to leave Fezco O'Neill's (Angus Cloud) apartment when his dangerous supplier Mouse arrives. Mouse coerces Rue into taking fentanyl, to Fezco's dismay.

Nate breaks into the apartment of Tyler Clarkson (Lukas Gage) and accuses him of the statutory rape of Maddy, who earlier falsely told Nate she blacked out; Tyler is disturbed to learn that Maddy was underage. Nate brutally beats Tyler, helps himself to a shower and steals Tyler's clothes. He then takes Maddy bowling and has sex with her in an alleyway. Meanwhile, Kat discovers that her video has been reuploaded to PornHub by another user, but is stunned to discover that it is filled with positive comments.

Rue begins to black out, and without the money to pay for her high, Mouse looks to take advantage of her until Fezco steps in to pay. After Mouse leaves, Fezco calls Jules to drive Rue to her place, where Jules engages in a conversation with a Scruff user "ShyGuy118" over text. The episode ends revealing Nate is "ShyGuy118", who tells Jules his name is "Tyler".

== Production ==
=== Writing ===
"Stuntin' Like My Daddy" from the 2006 Birdman and Lil Wayne collaborative album Like Father, Like Son is the origin of the episode's title. This name was chosen to parallel Nate and his father.

=== Filming ===
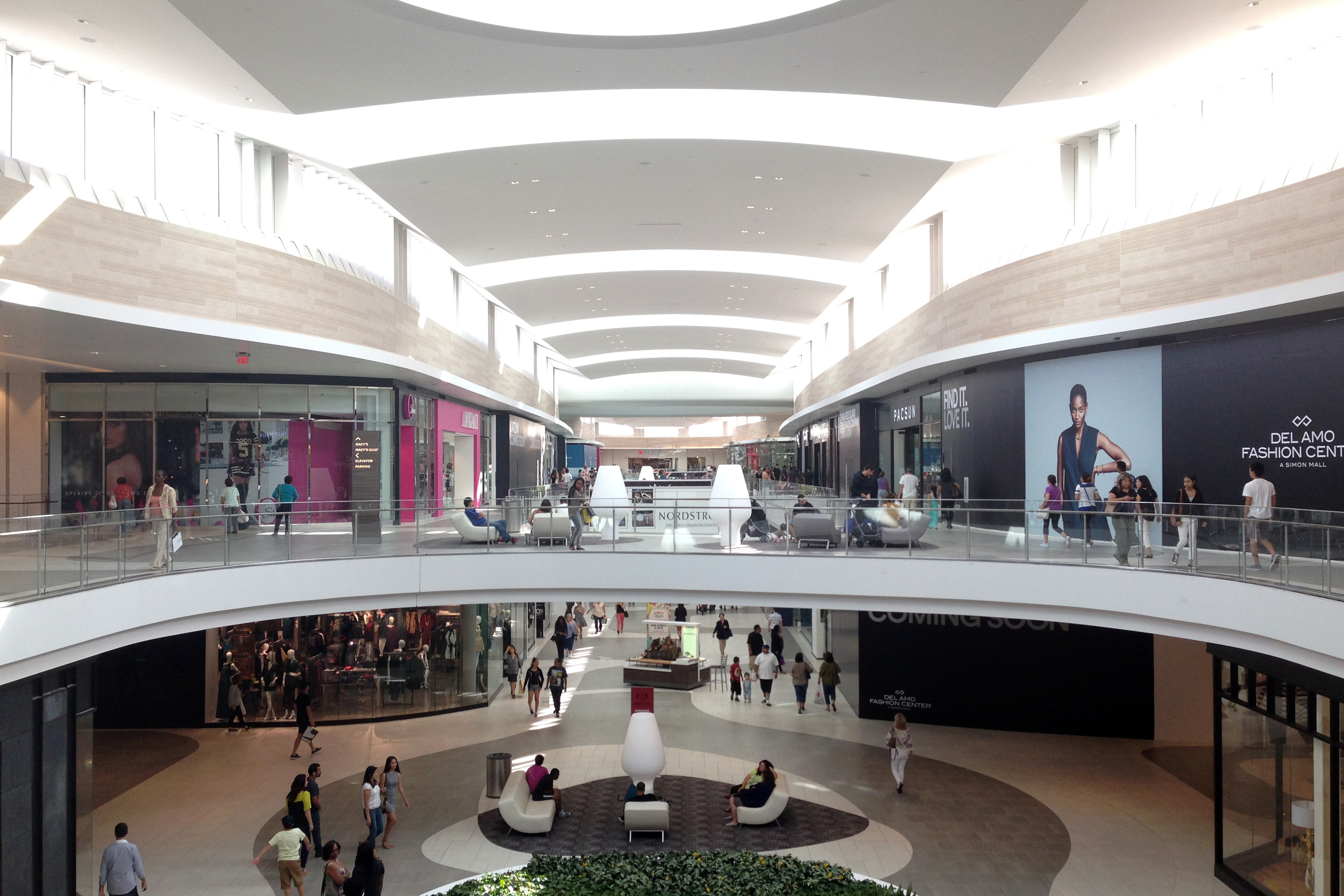
Del Amo Fashion Center was used as a filming location for the episode.

Location shooting for the shopping mall where Nate stalks Tyler took place at Del Amo Fashion Center in Torrance, California. This was also the first episode where East Highland High school appears, the exterior of which was filmed at Grant High School in Valley Glen, Los Angeles. In an behind-the-scenes video uploaded to Euphoria's YouTube channel, Nate's actor Elordi spoke on his character work in the episode, "When I was, uh, developing the character and putting it all together, I had this journal, and his father was, like, the centerpiece of the entire journal. I had this- this big photo of Eric Dane in the middle of the book and then I would sort of form everything around it."

=== Music ===
This is the only episode of the first two seasons where the title song appears, playing over the episode's title card. Rue remembering singing a song in the car and the memory quickly devolving into a drug-fueled, angry outburst is set to "Fly Me to the Moon" by Bobby Womack. Nate puts on "Even the Nights Are Better" by Air Supply when he showers and steals Tyler's clothes.

== Reception ==
=== Ratings ===
Viewership and ratings per episode of Stuntin' Like My Daddy
No.	Title	Air date	Rating/share (18–49)	Viewers (millions)	DVR (18–49)	DVR viewers (millions)	Total (18–49)	Total viewers (millions)
2	"Stuntin' Like My Daddy"	June 23, 2019	0.20	0.574	0.07	0.200	0.27	0.774

=== Critical reviews ===
In a ranking of the first two seasons and specials, BuzzFeed listed "Stuntin' Like My Daddy" at fourteen out of eighteen, writing: "I hate Nate. You hate Nate. We all hate Nate. And that makes it very difficult to love the Nate-centered episode in season 1, where we learn why he's such an asshole. [...] This episode has a bit more going on than other connector episodes (the fentanyl scene is tense and Kat's revelation that people are into her is exciting), but it's still a lull between the compelling premiere and juicier mid-season highs." IndieWire placed it in twelfth in a list which included season three's premiere "Ándale", writing that "Even among season 1’s weaker entries, "Stuntin’ Like My Daddy" remains a key proof of concept for early Euphoria. After only hinting at the depth of Nate’s menace in the pilot, this episode gives Jacob Elordi complete control over the series’ burning neuroses, while simultaneously planting the seeds needed for his dad Cal’s eventual demise. Featuring Lukas Gage as the real Tyler (i.e. not Nate’s alter ego, "ShyGuy118"), the beginning of the Jacobs’ family blackmailing scheme lands with brutal clarity. Paired with Jules’ vulnerability and Rue’s quietly devastating backstory — crystallized in a tragic scene that shows her stealing medication from her late father — it’s more than enough for one episode. And yet, you can already see Levinson overreaching here, as he introduces a needless criminal subplot that signals an early misunderstanding of his own show’s strengths."

In a four out of five star review for Vulture, Allie Pape wrote that "two hours into HBO’s new teen drama, Euphoria, I’m still not really sure who it’s for. Is it meant to be relatable content for a generation of teens raised on financial anxiety and active-shooter drills — despite the fact that those shocks have made them less, not more, likely to seek out sex, drugs, and booze? Is it a terrifying 'lock up your kids' cautionary tale for a generation of parents who’ve already got their kids pretty well locked up? Is it a fun, sexy fantasy for those who dream of reliving their long-gone adolescence with the rocket-booster of a smartphone? [...] This sheer quantity of go-for-broke licentiousness could be fun, were the show not so dead set on reminding viewers that it’s all symptomatic of our broken culture, and that they’re monsters for enjoying any of it. But perhaps that’s the intended takeaway: If we’ve created a world where even gorgeous, rebellious teens can’t enjoy being young and partying hard, what hope do the rest of us have?"

One scene depicting Nate's uncomfortability in the changing room, which involved more than thirty shots of penises was criticized by both critics and supporters, with Esquire calling it "pointlessly gratuitous when it didn't have to be". Zendaya addressed the sequence three days after broadcast on The Late Show with Stephen Colbert, saying "Yeah, that was the headline" and agreeing with Stephen Colbert on the double standard of nudity.
