= List of Euphoria characters =

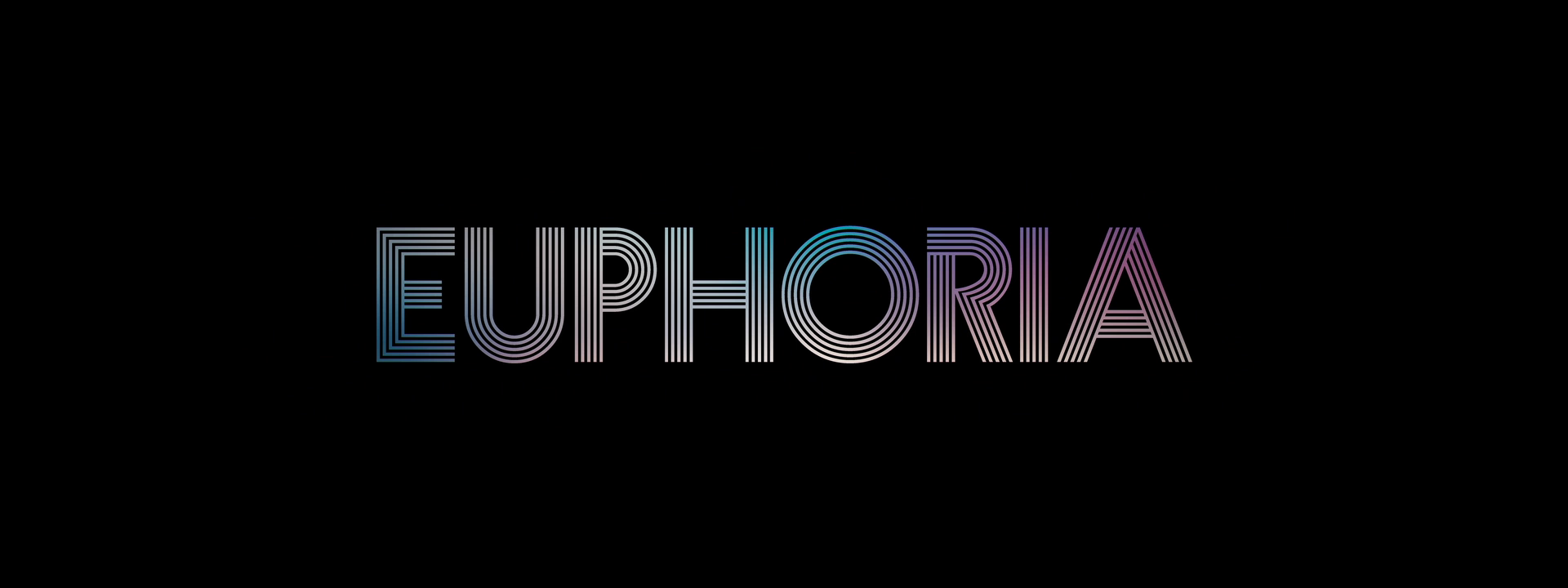
The title card of Euphoria's first season.

Euphoria is an American psychological teen drama television series created by Sam Levinson, which centers on a group of dysfunctional high school students at East Highland High School. The series premiered on June 16, 2019, on HBO.

== Appearances ==
Key
Main cast (credited)
Recurring cast (3 or more episodes)
Guest cast (1–2 episodes)

Actor	Character	Seasons			Specials
Actor	Character	1	2	3	Specials
Main characters
Zendaya	Rue Bennett	Main	Main	Main	Main
Maude Apatow	Lexi Howard	Main	Main	Main	
Angus Cloud	Fezco O'Neill	Main	Main	Archive	
Eric Dane	Cal Jacobs	Main (Note: Credited among the main cast up to the episode "The Ballad of Paladin" in the third season.)	Main	Main	
Alexa Demie	Maddy Perez	Main	Main	Main	
Jacob Elordi	Nate Jacobs	Main (Note: Credited among the main cast up to the episode "Rain or Shine" in the third season.)	Main	Main	Main
Barbie Ferreira	Kat Hernandez	Main	Main		
Nika King	Leslie Bennett	Main	Main	Guest	
Storm Reid	Gia Bennett	Main	Main	Archive	
Hunter Schafer	Jules Vaughn	Main	Main	Main	Main
Algee Smith	Chris McKay	Main (Note: Credited among the main cast up to the episode "Out of Touch" in the second season.)	Main		
Sydney Sweeney	Cassie Howard	Main	Main	Main	
Colman Domingo	Ali Muhammad	Recurring	Recurring	Recurring	Main (Note: Credited among the main cast in the special episode "Trouble Don't Last Always".)
Javon "Wanna" Walton	Ashtray	Recurring	Main		
Austin Abrams	Ethan Daley	Recurring	Main		
Dominic Fike	Elliot		Main		
Adewale Akinnuoye-Agbaje	Alamo Brown			Main	
Martha Kelly	Laurie		Recurring	Main	
Chloe Cherry	Faye Valentine		Recurring	Main	
Toby Wallace	Wayne			Main	
Recurring characters
Alanna Ubach	Suze Howard	Recurring	Recurring	Guest	
Lukas Gage	Tyler Clarkson	Recurring			
John Ales	David Vaughn	Recurring	Guest		Guest
Bruce Wexler	Robert Bennett	Recurring	Guest	Stand-in (Note: Portrayed by an uncredited actor in the episode "In God We Trust" in the third season.)	
Sophia Rose Wilson	Barbara Brooks	Recurring	Recurring	Guest	
Tyler Timmons	Troy McKay	Recurring			
Tristan Timmons	Roy McKay	Recurring			
Keean Johnson	Daniel Dimarco	Recurring			
Paula Marshall	Marsha Jacobs	Recurring	Recurring	Guest	
Zak Steiner	Aaron Jacobs	Recurring	Recurring	Guest	
Mercedes Colon	Kat's Mom	Recurring			
Tyler Chase	Custer	Recurring	Recurring		
Meeko	Mouse	Recurring	Guest		
Marsha Gambles	Miss Marsha	Recurring	Guest	Guest	Guest
Brynda Mattox	Marie O'Neill	Recurring	Guest		
Nick Blood	Gus Howard	Guest	Recurring		
Melvin "Bonez" Estes	Bruce Sr.		Recurring	Recurring	
Ansel Pierce	Caleb		Recurring		
Minka Kelly	Samantha		Recurring		
Yukon Clement	Theo		Recurring		
Fernando Belo	Sebastian		Recurring		
Veronica Taylor	Bobbi		Recurring		
Gwen Mukes	Leslie's Mom		Recurring		
Daeg Faerch	Mitch Bilster		Guest	Recurring	
Sharon Stone	Patricia Lance			Recurring	
Colleen Camp	LA Nights Director			Recurring	
Marshawn "Beast Mode" Lynch	G			Recurring	
Darrell Britt-Gibson	Bishop			Recurring	
James Landry Hébert	Harley			Recurring	
Rebecca Pidgeon	Ms. Penzler			Recurring	
Gideon Adlon	Gillie			Recurring	
Asante Blackk	Kidd			Recurring	
Homer Gere	Dylan Reid			Recurring	
Madison Thompson	Oceana			Recurring	
Jessica Blair Herman	Heather			Recurring	
Rosalía	Magick			Recurring	
Kadeem Hardison	Big Eddy			Recurring	
Jeff Wahlberg	Brandon Fontaine			Recurring	
Sam Trammell	Ellis			Recurring	
Jack Topalian	Naz			Recurring	
Matthew Willig	Artur			Recurring	
Hemky Madera	Jimenez			Recurring	
William "Bill" Bodner	Bowman			Recurring	
Anna Van Patten	Kitty			Recurring	

== Main characters ==
=== Rue Bennett ===
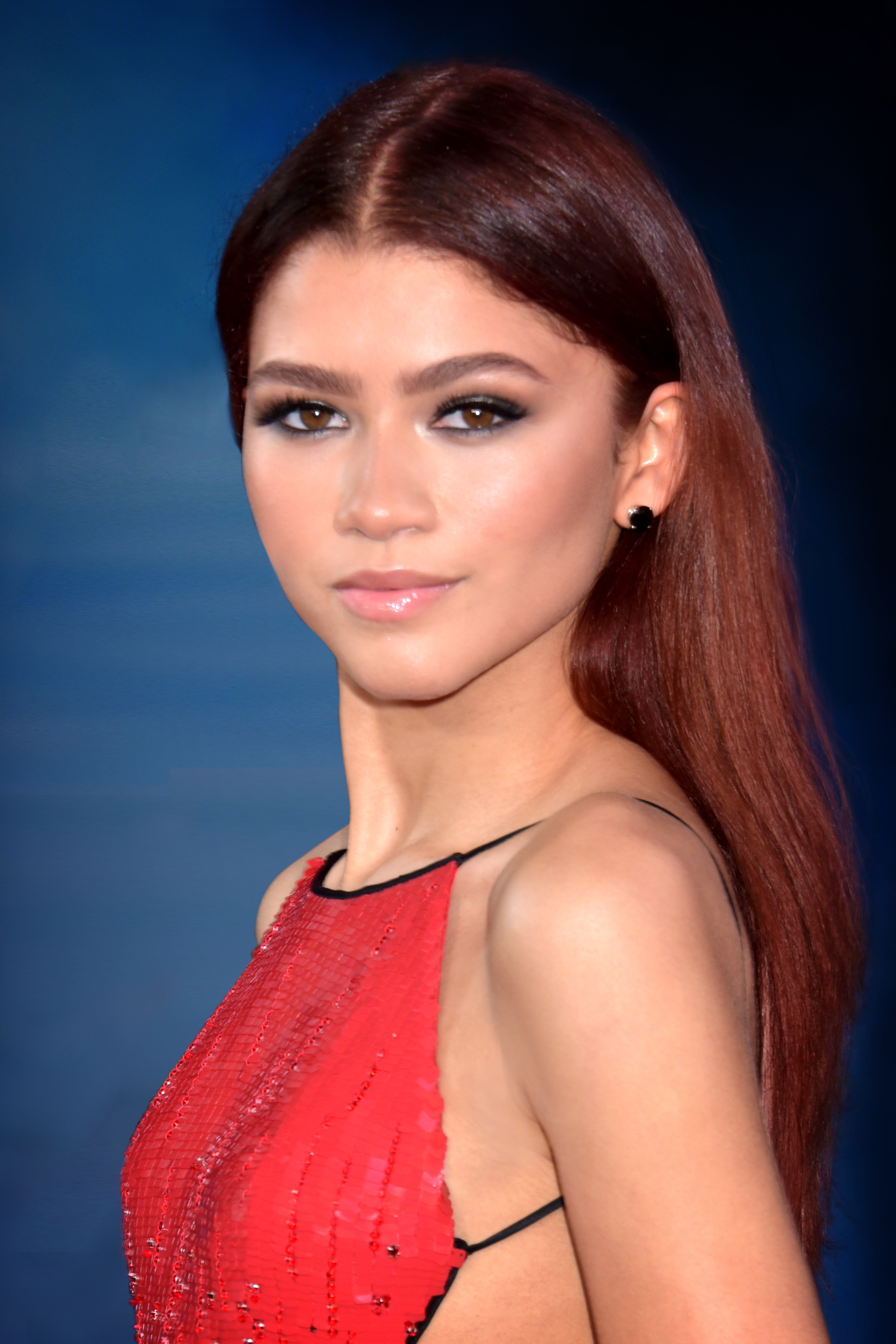
Zendaya stars as Rue, and also serves as executive producer.

- portrayed by Zendaya
  - Janice LeAnn Brown (4 years old, "Pilot" and "And Salt the Earth Behind You")
  - McKenna Rae Roberts (10 years old, "Pilot")
  - Aliyah Conley (13 years old, "'03 Bonnie and Clyde")
  - Alumière Glass (3 years old, "Stand Still Like the Hummingbird")

Ruby "Rue" Bennett was born on September 14, 2001, three days after 9/11. She is a recovering teenage drug addict who is fresh out of rehab and struggling to find her place in the world. Sarcastic and introverted, she serves as the narrator for the series. In the first season, she lives with her mom and sister. Her dad died from cancer before the start of the series. She is childhood friends with Lexi, and develops a romantic relationship with Jules. The second season finds her continuing to struggle with addiction as she becomes involved with drug trafficking for Laurie and enters an official relationship with Jules. In the third season, Rue is indebted to Laurie and is working as a drug mule to pay off her debt. She no longer lives with her mother or sister, maintains a friendship with Lexi, but has grown away from Jules. Alamo Brown, a local crime boss who operates strip clubs and partakes in arms trafficking, frees Rue from her debt to Laurie by employing her himself. She reconnects with Jules but is busted by the DEA, and agrees to work with them to avoid going to jail herself. At the end of the third season, Rue is poisoned by Alamo as revenge for working with the DEA, and she dies by fentanyl overdose on Ali's couch.

=== Lexi Howard ===
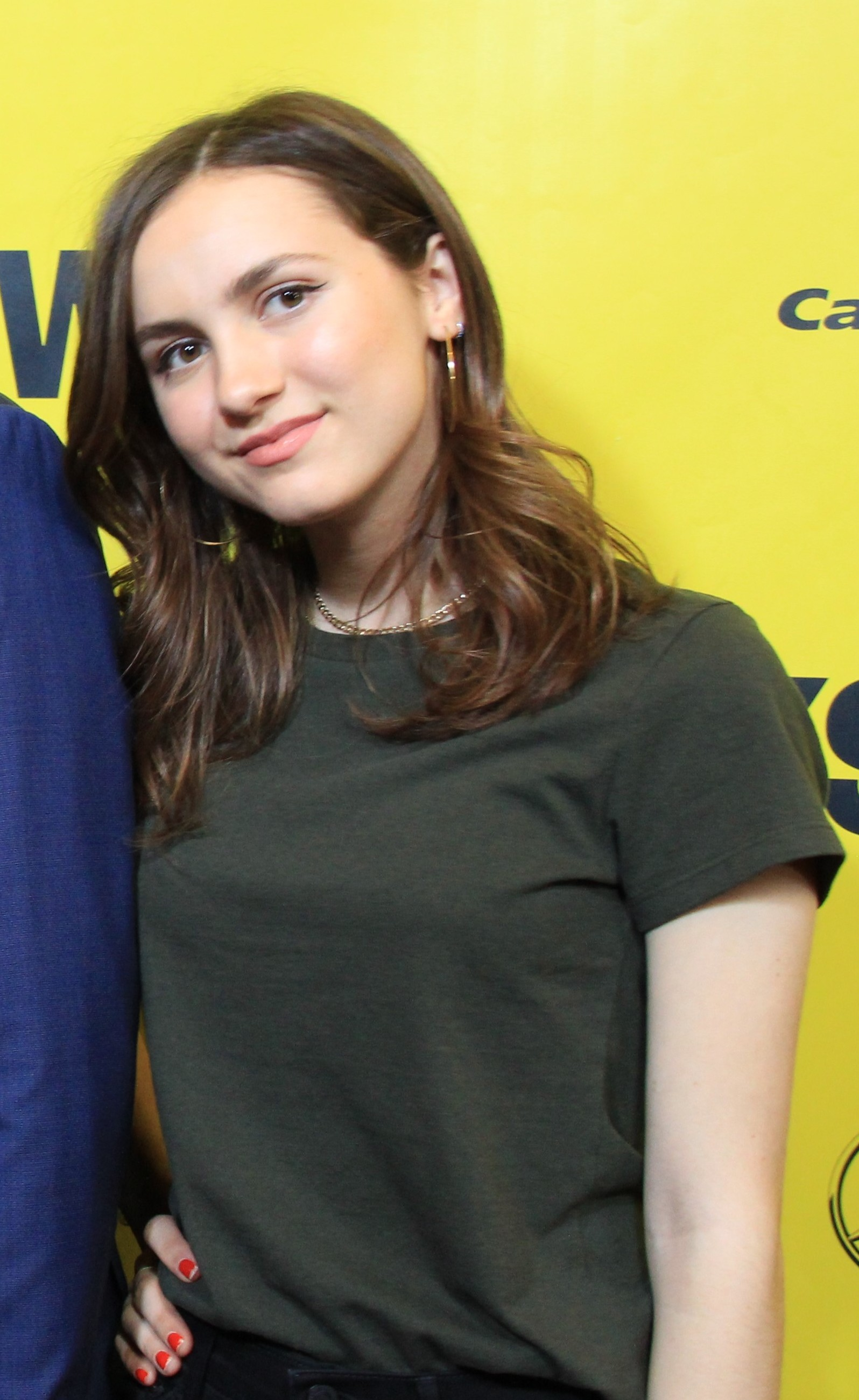
Maude Apatow stars as Lexi, Rue's childhood best friend.

- portrayed by Maude Apatow

Alexis "Lexi" Howard was born on October 23, 2001. She is Rue's childhood best friend and Cassie's younger sister. She spends most of her teenage years in the shadow of her sister, always feeling like an outsider and an observer of her own life. Determined to do more and to finally step into the spotlight, she creates a play called "Our Life" in the second season and bases it on events that have happened around her, including unflattering depictions of her friends. At the same time, she grows closer to Fezco after discovering an unexpected compatibility, including some unusual, shared interests (such as the 1986 film Stand by Me). In the third season, Lexi has continued to maintain a friendship with Rue and has become an assistant to Patricia Lance, the showrunner for the television series LA Nights.

=== Fezco O'Neill ===
- portrayed by Angus Cloud (seasons 1–2)
  - Mason Shea Joyce (10 years old, "Trying to Get to Heaven Before They Close the Door")

Patrick "Fezco" O'Neill is a local drug dealer with a close, sibling-like relationship with Rue. He was raised by his grandmother, who is now disabled and he cares for. He lives with Ashtray ("Ash"), who he considers his business partner. Even though they are not related by blood, they treat each other like brothers. Fez starts a camaraderie with Lexi during the second season. In the third season, he is incarcerated in prison following his arrest at the end of the second season, but he still stays in contact with Rue.

=== Cal Jacobs ===
- portrayed by Eric Dane
  - Elias Kacavas (18 years old, "Ruminations: Big and Little Bullys")

Cal Jacobs is Nate's strict, demanding father who lives a double life. He is married to and fathered three children with Marsha, his high school girlfriend. In secret, he is a closeted pansexual who has one-night stands with men and transgender youths, including Jules, which he records with a hidden camera. In the second season, he drunkenly reveals his infidelity to his wife and children and leaves his family before being arrested. In the third season, Cal is an alcoholic who lives on his own after his wife divorced him. He attends Nate's wedding and reveals to Jules that he is now a registered sex offender as a result of being busted for sleeping with a 17-year-old who misled him about his age. He considers high school to be the best years of his life and asserts to Nate that his sexual relations with men were simply acts of hedonism.

=== Maddy Perez ===
- portrayed by Alexa Demie
  - Keilani Arellanes (11 years old, "Made You Look", "'03 Bonnie and Clyde", and "Out of Touch")

Madeleine "Maddy" Perez was born on January 28, 2001. She is confident, popular, and cruel. She is Nate's on-and-off girlfriend and later ex-girlfriend. She has a turbulent relationship with her family and was emotionally and physically abused by Nate while they were together. Her greatest fear is ending up in a loveless relationship like her parents', so she often excuses Nate's acts of violence as proof of his passion and love for her, even going so far as to help him frame an innocent man for physically assaulting her, so Nate would get back together with her. Despite her hotheadedness, she can be kind and values her close friends, like Kat and BB, as well as Rue, Jules, and Lexi. Cassie was once her closest friend, before Cassie betrayed Maddy by having a secret relationship with Nate in the second season. Maddy ends their friendship, and her remaining friends support her decision. Maddy assaults Cassie after the latter interrupts Lexi's play. Afterwards, Cassie's remorse for her actions only furthers Maddy's resentment. In the third season, Maddy works as an assistant for the talent manager Ms. Penzler, before branching off on her own. She is initially successful, but eventually loses her best client. She reluctantly reconnects with Cassie for the first time since high school, seeing an opportunity to use Cassie to boost her own clientele. She attends Nate and Cassie's wedding but is overcome with emotion at the reception and leaves. Maddy later meets Rue's boss, Alamo Brown, and they agree to work together, with Maddy helping to promote some of Alamo's girls from his strip clubs. She later loses her job after her boss discovers that Maddy has Cassie as a client, and becomes indebted to Alamo when he helps save Cassie when she is kidnapped by Naz. Maddy then begins a partnership with Cassie and uses Nate's mansion to create a content house featuring Alamo's girls.

=== Nate Jacobs ===
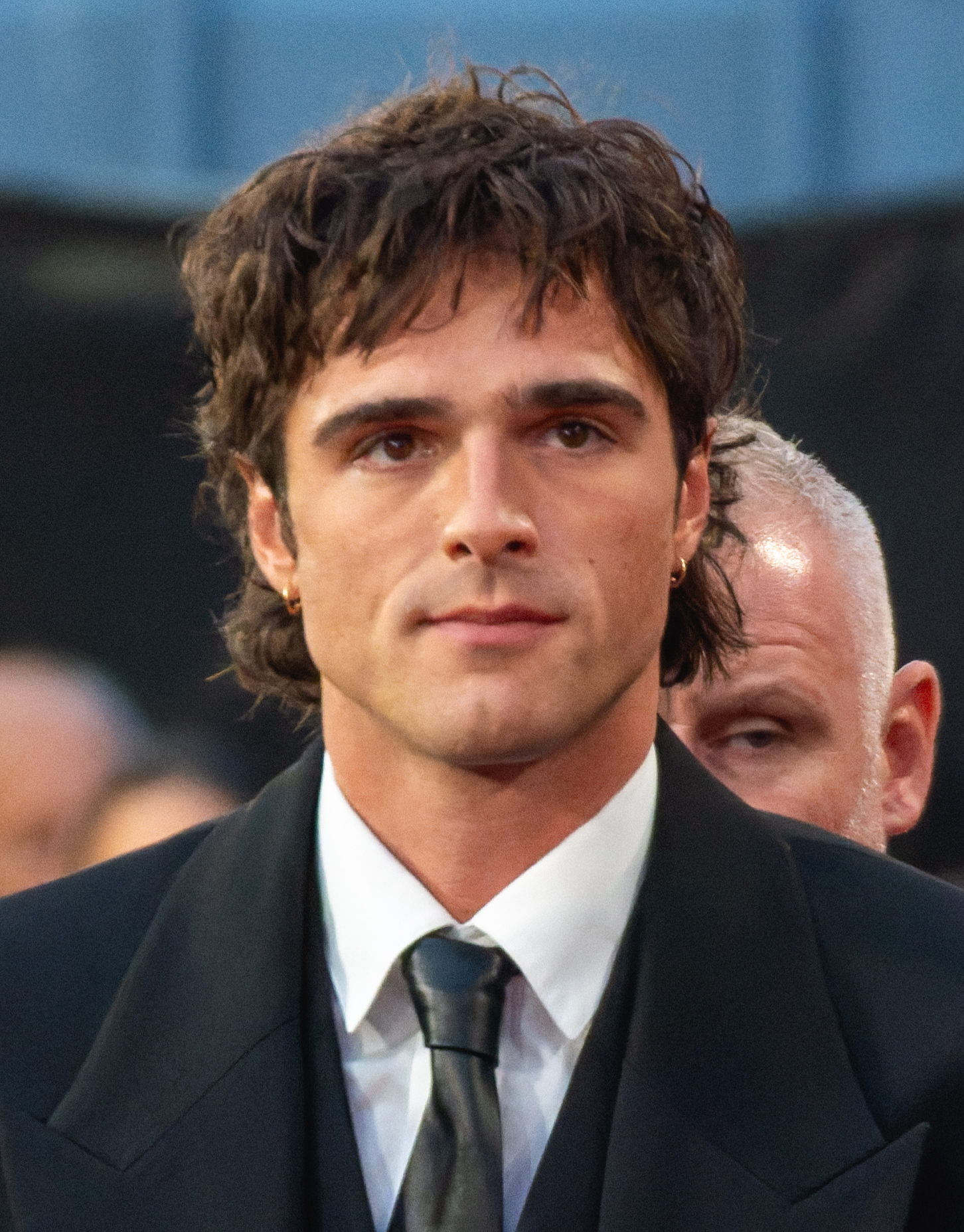
Jacob Elordi stars as Nate, Maddy's on-and-off boyfriend.

- portrayed by Jacob Elordi
  - Gabriel Golub (11 years old, "Stuntin' Like My Daddy")

Nathaniel "Nate" Jacobs was born on November 8, 2000. He is a high school athlete whose anger issues masked his sexual insecurities. He was traumatized as a child after viewing his father Cal's collection of pornography, which featured him having sex with male and transgender prostitutes. He harbored an unspecified fixation on Jules, had an on-and-off toxic relationship with Maddy, but later started a secret relationship with Cassie in the second season, which damaged the girls' friendship. Nate often had dangerous outbursts of anger and violence, of which Maddy was usually on the receiving end. In the third season, Nate shed his anger issues and became engaged to Cassie. He took over his father's construction company but had financial issues that indebted him to Naz, a dangerous mortuary mogul. Initially, he hid his debts from Cassie, but on their wedding night, his situation was exposed to her when Naz ordered his henchman to remove Nate's toe as a reminder of his debt. After being buried alive by Naz to force Cassie to settle the debt, Nate succumbs to a fatal rattlesnake bite.

=== Kat Hernandez ===
- portrayed by Barbie Ferreira (seasons 1–2)
  - Johanna Colón (11 years old, "Made You Look")

Katherine "Kat" Hernandez was born on August 15, 2002. She is a girl fighting for body positivity while exploring her sexuality. She is a plus-sized teenager with chin-length hair, ivory skin, and dark brown eyes. She wears cat-eye glasses, and her everyday clothes often consist of average shirts, tops, and dresses, preferring minimalist makeup looks. After a video of Kat having sex is spread online, she is initially horrified but becomes intrigued when she receives comments expressing their arousal by her. Kat begins to wear bolder clothing, has a brasher personality, and becomes sexually active. However, Kat's insecurities grow when she gets closer to classmate Ethan Daley, which culminates in her confessing her feelings to Ethan. In season two, Kat continues dating Ethan, but over time, Kat becomes increasingly aware of her insecurities and begins to project her self-loathing onto Ethan. Kat tries to gaslight Ethan and blame her problems on him, but Ethan sees through her and reluctantly ends their relationship. Kat is later present when Maddy learns that Cassie had been sleeping with Nate behind her back.

=== Leslie Bennett ===
- portrayed by Nika King (seasons 1–2; guest season 3)
  - Malia Barnhardt (14 years old, "A Thousand Little Trees of Blood")

Leslie Bennett is Rue and Gia's mother. After the death of her husband, Leslie takes care of her children on her own. Leslie hopes for Rue's sobriety, but after being deceived multiple times by Rue, she chooses to prioritize Gia by kicking Rue out of their home after the end of the second season. In the third season, while Leslie and Rue's relationship remains strained, they still keep in contact.

=== Gia Bennett ===
- portrayed by Storm Reid (seasons 1–2)
  - Hyla Rayne Fontenot (7 years old, "Pilot")
  - Nyran Hepburn and Ashton Hunsberger (Baby, "Stand Still Like the Hummingbird")

Georgia "Gia" Bennett was born in late 2005 and is Rue's caring and loyal younger sister. The summer before Rue's junior year, Gia found her overdosing and choking on a pool of vomit, which traumatized her.

=== Jules Vaughn ===
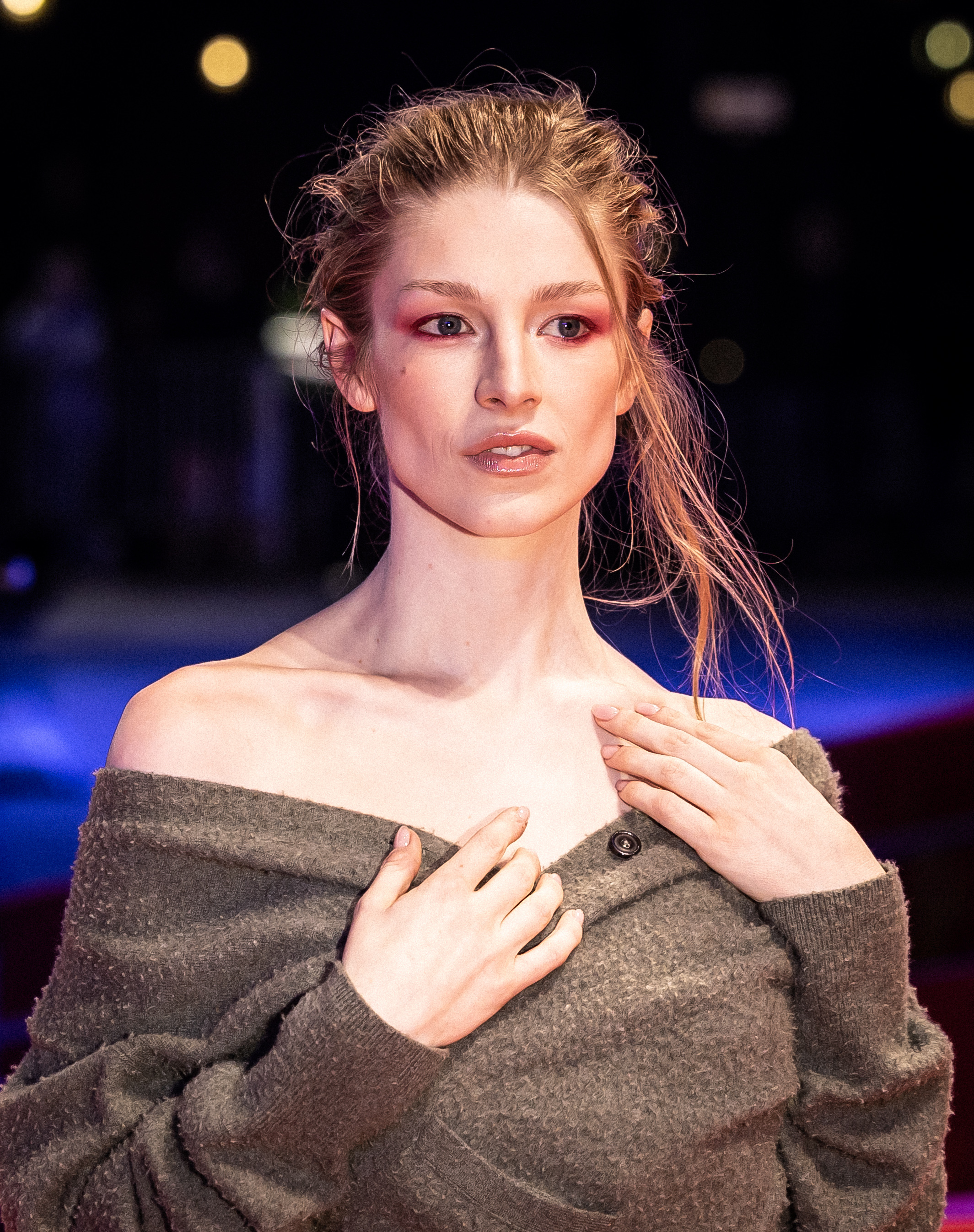
Hunter Schafer stars as Jules, Rue's love interest.

- portrayed by Hunter Schafer
  - Clark Furlong (11 years old, "Shook Ones Pt. II")

Jules Vaughn is a transgender girl who enters into a turbulent relationship with Rue after moving to town with her father. She has a strained relationship with her mother, who placed her in a psychiatric hospital against her will when she was 11. She transitioned when she was 14. Free-spirited and kind, as well as emotional and impulsive, she often finds herself bearing the weight of Rue's addiction. She has a secret encounter with Cal, Nate's father, whom she lied about her age to. Jules begins chatting with, and eventually falls for, a guy she met online. She thinks his name is Tyler, but it is actually Nate. The truth is revealed when the two finally meet in person, and Jules is heartbroken. In the second season, she begins a relationship with Rue but eventually cheats on her with Elliot. In the third season, Jules is revealed to have dropped out of art school and has become a successful escort. She reconnects with Rue and the two briefly renew a sexual relationship, despite Jules sugaring for Ellis, a wealthy surgeon who pays for Jules lavish lifestyle. Rue attempts to rekindle a romantic relationship with Jules, but she declines. When Rue claims Ellis does not love her, Jules slaps Rue. After she later learns of Rue's death, Jules mourns Rue by painting a picture of her.

=== Chris McKay ===
- portrayed by Algee Smith (seasons 1–2)
  - Yohance and Zakai Biagas-Bey (11 years old, "The Next Episode")

Christopher "Chris" McKay is a young football player and Cassie's ex-boyfriend, who is having difficulties adjusting to college. He is hazed by his fraternity brothers at a party and ends up getting Cassie pregnant, which leads to her having an abortion. Struggling with the problems in his life, Chris eventually breaks up with Cassie.

=== Cassie Howard ===
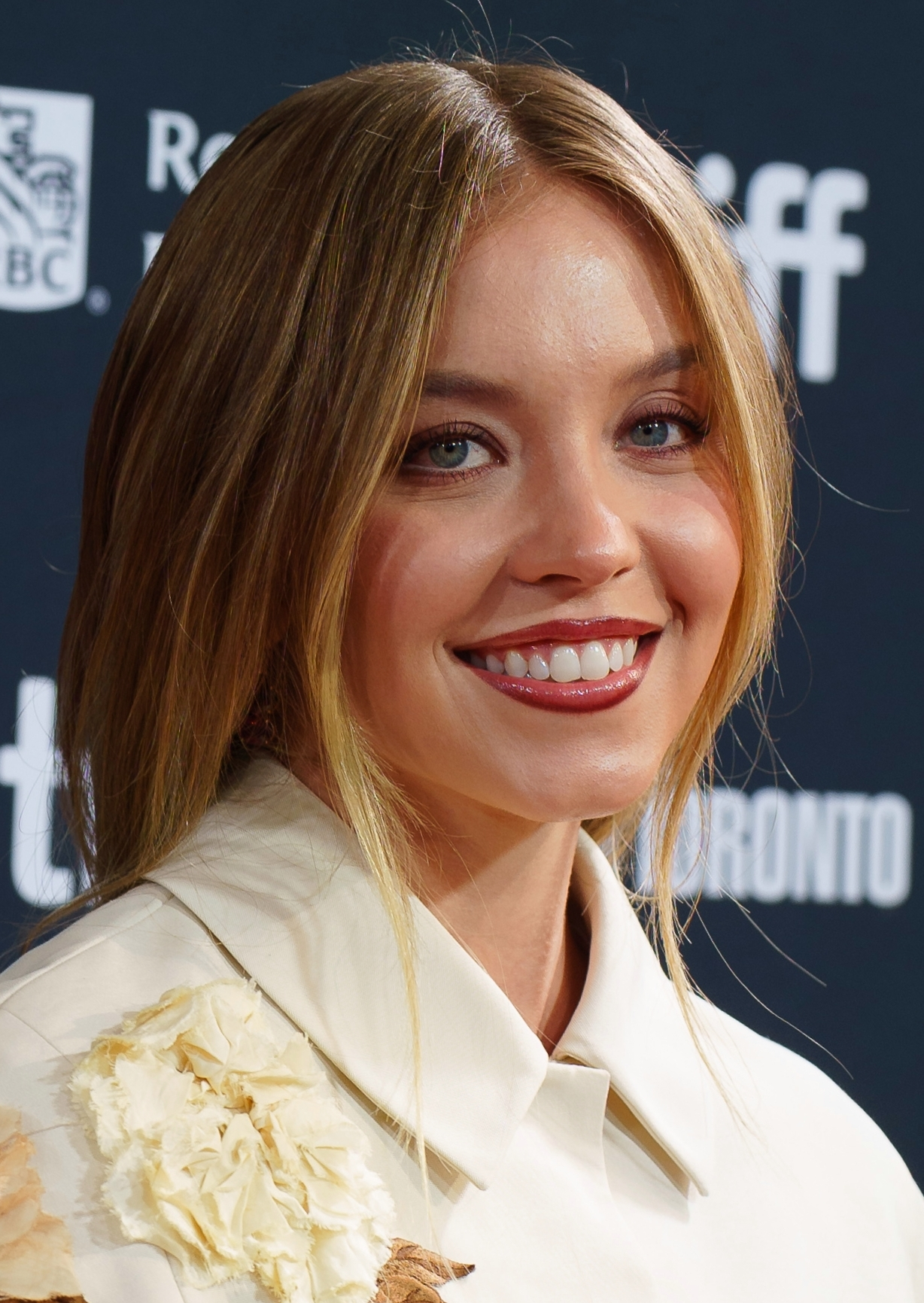
Sydney Sweeney stars as Cassie, Lexi's sister.

- portrayed by Sydney Sweeney
  - Kyra Adler (11 years old, "The Trials and Tribulations of Trying to Pee While Depressed")

Cassandra "Cassie" Jacobs (née Howard) was born on August 16, 2000. She is a sweet and popular girl who enjoys ice skating and is Lexi's older sister. Facing objectification from a young age, as well as her father becoming an addict and leaving her family, has left the need for male validation as her Achilles' heel. She has had multiple past relationships, which often ended in revenge porn. She is Maddy's closest friend and confidant, even having a stronger bond with Maddy than with Lexi. She enters a relationship with McKay, who she later breaks up with after he gets her pregnant, causing her to have an abortion. Seeking comfort, she engages in a secret relationship with Nate in the second season, causing her to lose her sense of self and eventually ruining her friendship with Maddy when the truth comes out. The betrayal causes Cassie to be ostracized, and she isolates herself further. Cassie has a public meltdown in relation to Lexi's school play and Nate ending their relationship. Trying to embrace her self-proclaimed title as "the villain", it leads to further ridicule from her fellow students and a physical altercation with Maddy. In the third season, Cassie is engaged to Nate. While she is unemployed, she dabbles in sexual content creation to earn additional income. Cassie reaches out to Maddy to reconnect and apologizes for her actions in high school. Cassie and Nate later get married, but Cassie becomes involved in Nate's debt to Naz, a dangerous mortuary mogul. Cassie moves out of their home to invest more time working with Maddy to make more content. She later becomes a widow following Nate's death.

=== Ali Muhammad ===
- portrayed by Colman Domingo ("Trouble Don't Last Always"; recurring seasons 1–3)

Ali Muhammad (né Martin McQueen) is a Gulf War veteran in recovery from substance use disorder who often speaks at Rue's Narcotics Anonymous meetings and eventually becomes her sponsor. In the third season, Ali continues to offer Rue guidance. At the end of the third season, he discovers that Rue had died from an overdose while sleeping on his couch, after the Percocet she had taken was laced with fentanyl. Knowing that Alamo supplied the drug, Ali quits hosting his NA meetings and confronts Alamo, ending in a standoff where Ali kills Alamo and avenges Rue. Some time later, Ali visits the religious family that Rue connected with, informs them of her death, and is invited to dinner. After he joins the family in prayer, Ali has a vision of Rue sitting at the table with them, finally at peace.

=== Ashtray ===
- portrayed by Javon "Wanna" Walton (season 2; recurring season 1)
  - Daelo Jin Walton (6 years old, "Trying to Get to Heaven Before They Close the Door")

Ashtray is Fezco's "little brother" and partner drug dealer; he is about 12 years old. At the end of the second season, he starts a shootout with the police during a raid at Fezco's house and, as a result, is shot in the head and killed by a SWAT team member.

=== Ethan Daley ===
- portrayed by Austin Abrams (season 2; recurring season 1)

Ethan Daley is introduced as a kind, friendly high schooler who catches feelings for Kat after they meet in class. The two start hanging out, and he becomes her boyfriend. In the second season, Ethan and Kat continue their relationship, but over time, Kat becomes emotionally abusive toward him because of her insecurities, and he reluctantly breaks up with her. Ethan then joins the school theater play production, written and directed by Lexi, and garners praise for his performance in the lead role.

=== Elliot ===
- portrayed by Dominic Fike (season 2)

Elliot is a classmate and new friend of Rue's, who forms a rift between her and Jules. He is also a musician and a drug addict.

=== Alamo Brown ===
- portrayed by Adewale Akinnuoye-Agbaje (season 3)
  - Ca'ron Jaden Coleman (young, "Stand Still and See")

Alamo Brown is a dangerous yet magnetic strip club magnate and arms dealer who takes Rue under his wing. He begins a feud with Laurie after one of his strippers overdoses on the drugs she supplied. He later meets Maddy and works with her to expand his empire into making content online. At the end of the season, he is shot and killed by Ali in a duel when he raids the Silver Slipper to avenge Rue's death.

=== Laurie ===
- portrayed by Martha Kelly (season 3; recurring season 2)

Laurie is a former school teacher turned drug dealer who crosses paths with Rue. Unlike her employees, Laurie is calm and soft-spoken; however, she claims to be ruthless when it comes to making her money back. She used to be addicted to OxyContin, and her addiction forced her into prostitution to earn money for drugs to avoid withdrawal. In the third season, Laurie employs Rue against her will as a drug mule to make up for the money Rue owes her for a suitcase of drugs. She finds herself engaged in a feud with a dangerous client, Alamo Brown, after one of his employees dies from a fentanyl overdose and he takes Rue under his wing. Amidst the feud, Brown instructs his enforcer, Bishop, to kill Laurie's beloved pet bird, Paladin. At the end of the third season, Laurie commits suicide and hangs herself to avoid going to prison when her compound is raided by the DEA.

=== Faye Valentine ===
- portrayed by Chloe Cherry (season 3; recurring season 2)

Faye Valentine is introduced as Custer's girlfriend, who stays with Fezco and Ashtray after she becomes wanted by the police for pushing her superintendent off a motel balcony. She is initially presented as a drug addict and a somewhat self-centered airhead who is rude toward Rue after she expresses discomfort over doing heroin; however, she is shown to be kinder and gradually forms a friendship with Fez. After learning her boyfriend is cooperating with the police against Fez, she is conflicted due to her split loyalties. Shortly before the police raid Fez's apartment, Faye signals to Fez to warn him that Custer may be recording their conversation. In the third season, Faye works with Rue as a drug mule for Laurie. She forms a relationship with Wayne, one of Laurie's relatives. Unbeknownst to her, she accidentally contaminates some of the drugs that are sold to local crime boss Alamo, which results in the death of one of his strippers. Her namesake is a reference to the Cowboy Bebop character of the same name.

=== Wayne ===
- portrayed by Toby Wallace (season 3)

Wayne is one of Laurie's relatives and a drug dealer. He is also Faye's love interest in the third season.

== Supporting characters ==
=== Recurring ===
- Suze Howard, portrayed by Alanna Ubach (seasons 1–2; guest season 3), is Lexi and Cassie's mother. She and Gus, her ex-husband, separated the night before Cassie started ninth grade. Although Suze allowed Gus to see their daughters on weekends, he visited less and less over time and eventually stopped showing up altogether. Despite being almost constantly inebriated, she acts as a loving and supportive mother.
- Tyler Clarkson, portrayed by Lukas Gage (season 1), is a college student who is brutally attacked by Nate for having sex with Maddy at a party. He falsely confesses to the police that he raped Maddy after Nate threatens him with an ultimatum.
- David Vaughn, portrayed by John Ales (seasons 1; guest season 2), is Jules' father.
- Robert Bennett, portrayed by Bruce Wexler (season 1; guest season 2), is Rue's father, seen in flashbacks, who died from cancer when Rue was 13.
- Daniel Dimarco, portrayed by Keean Johnson (season 1) and Isaac Arellanes (11 years old, "Made You Look"), is a junior who dated Kat in sixth grade and later tries to hook up with Cassie.
- Marsha Jacobs, portrayed by Paula Marshall (seasons 1–2; guest season 3) and Rebecca Louise (17 years old, "Ruminations: Big and Little Bullys"), is Nate and Aaron's mother and Cal's wife, until she divorces him prior to the third season.
- Aaron Jacobs, portrayed by Zak Steiner (seasons 1–2; guest season 3), is Nate's older brother. He is considered a "fuck-up" by his father and brother.
- Kat's Mom, portrayed by Mercedes Colon (season 1), is Kat's mother.
- Custer, portrayed by Tyler Chase (seasons 1–2), is an assistant to Mouse, Fez's supplier. In the second season, he is killed when Ashtray stabs him in the throat after discovering that Custer was working with the police.
- Gus Howard, portrayed by Nick Blood (season 2; guest season 1), is Lexi and Cassie's father, seen in flashbacks, and a painkiller addict who is estranged from the family.
- Samantha, portrayed by Minka Kelly (season 2), is Maddy's employer for her babysitting job during high school.
- Patricia "Patty" Lance, portrayed by Sharon Stone (season 3), is a Hollywood producer and Lexi's boss. She is the showrunner for the television soap opera LA Nights.
- LA Nights Director, portrayed by Colleen Camp (season 3), is the director of LA Nights.
- G, portrayed by Marshawn "Beast Mode" Lynch (season 3), is Alamo's high-ranking enforcer. At the end of the season, he is shot and killed by Ali when he raids the Silver Slipper to avenge Rue's death.
- Bishop, portrayed by Darrell Britt-Gibson (season 3), is Alamo's right-hand man.
- Harley, portrayed by James Landry Hébert (season 3), is a cousin of Laurie and the father of Wayne. At the end of the season, he is incarcerated after Laurie's compound is raided by the DEA.
- Ms. Penzler, portrayed by Rebecca Pidgeon (season 3), is a talent manager and Maddy's boss.
- Gillie, portrayed by Gideon Adlon (season 3), is Lexi's neighbour.
- Kidd, portrayed by Asante Blackk (season 3), is one of Alamo's associates.
- Dylan Reid, portrayed by Homer Gere (season 3), is a famous actor starring in LA Nights.
- Oceana, portrayed by Madison Thompson (season 3), is an actress working opposite Dylan in LA Nights.
- Heather, portrayed by Jessica Blair Herman (season 3), is Cassie's friend.
- Magick, portrayed by Rosalía (season 3), is a stripper employed by Alamo at the Silver Slipper, one of Alamo's strip clubs. She wears a neck brace in an attempt to win a lawsuit and is suspicious of Rue.
- Edward "Big Eddy" Wallace, portrayed by Kadeem Hardison (season 3), is one of Alamo's associates and the general manager of the Silver Slipper.
- Brandon Fontaine, portrayed by Jeff Wahlberg (season 3), is a popular influencer on social media.
- Ellis, portrayed by Sam Trammell (season 3), is a married plastic surgeon and Jules' sugar-daddy.
- Nassim "Naz", portrayed by Jack Topalian (season 3), is a threatening mortuary mogul whom Nate is indebted to. He is later killed by Alamo Brown after Naz held Nate and Cassie hostage over the money they owed him.
- Artur, portrayed by Matthew Willig (season 3), is Naz's enforcer, who uses violence against Nate.
- Jimenez, portrayed by Hemky Madera (season 3), is a DEA agent who arrests Rue.
- Katherine "Kitty", portrayed by Anna Van Patten (season 3), is a new stripper employed by Alamo at the Silver Slipper to replace Angel.

=== Guest stars ===
Introduced in season 1

- Principal Hayes, portrayed by Jeremiah Birkett, is the principal of East Highland High School. He appears in episodes "Stuntin' Like My Daddy" and "'03 Bonnie and Clyde".
- Trevor, portrayed by Shiloh Fernandez, is a store clerk at the Femme clothing store to whom Kat develops an attraction. He appears in "Made You Look" and "'03 Bonnie and Clyde".
- Amy Vaughn, portrayed by Pell James, is Jules' mother. She appears in "Shook Ones Pt. II" and "Fuck Anyone Who's Not a Sea Blob".
- Luke Kasten, portrayed by Will Peltz, is a notoriously "hung" former East Highland student who hooks up with Kat. He appears in "Shook Ones Pt. II".
- Sonia Perez, portrayed by Elpidia Carrillo, is Maddy's mother, an esthetician. She appears in "'03 Bonnie and Clyde" and "And Salt the Earth Behind You".
- Officer Wilson, portrayed by Larry Joe Campbell, is a local police officer. He appears in "'03 Bonnie and Clyde".
- Johnny, portrayed by Jeff Pope, is a man with a small penis who pursues Kat as a financial dominatrix under the username "Johnny_Unite_USA". He appears in "Made You Look" and "'03 Bonnie and Clyde".
- Minako, portrayed by Sean Martini, is one of Cal's transgender hookups. They appear in "'03 Bonnie and Clyde".
- Frederick McKay, portrayed by Cranston Johnson, is McKay's father. He appears in "The Next Episode".
- Rick, portrayed by Nat Faxon, is Leslie's new boyfriend. He appears in "The Trials and Tribulations of Trying to Pee While Depressed".
- T.C., portrayed by Bobbi Salvör Menuez, is Jules' non-binary friend from the city. They appear in "The Trials and Tribulations of Trying to Pee While Depressed".
- Anna, portrayed by Quintessa Swindell, is T.C.'s friend who hooks up with Jules. She appears in "The Trials and Tribulations of Trying to Pee While Depressed".
- Harris, portrayed by Shamari Maurice, is T.C.'s friend. They appear in "The Trials and Tribulations of Trying to Pee While Depressed".
- Natalie, portrayed by Allie Marie Evans, is Nate's winter formal date. She appears in "And Salt the Earth Behind You".
- Dr. Mardy Nichols, portrayed by Lauren Weedman, is Jules' therapist. She appears in "Fuck Anyone Who's Not a Sea Blob".
- "Tyler", portrayed by Jayden Marcos, is Jules' imaginary version of Nate's online persona. He appears in "Fuck Anyone Who's Not a Sea Blob".

Introduced in season 2

- Bowl-Cut, portrayed by Andy Mackenzie, is a drug dealer, seen in flashbacks, who rips off Fez's grandma. He appears in "Trying to Get to Heaven Before They Close the Door".
- Bruce Jr., portrayed by Richie Merritt, is a drug dealer working for Laurie and Bruce Sr.'s son. He appears in "Trying to Get to Heaven Before They Close the Door" and "Stand Still Like the Hummingbird".
- Travis, portrayed by Demetrius Flenory Jr., is a DJ and producer who flirts with Maddy. He appears in "Trying to Get to Heaven Before They Close the Door".
- Derek, portrayed by Henry Eikenberry, is Cal's best friend in high school, seen in flashbacks. He appears in "Ruminations: Big and Little Bullys" and "You Who Cannot See, Think of Those Who Can".
- Jade, portrayed by Aja Bair, is the character in Lexi's play based on Rue. She appears in "The Theater and Its Double" and "All My Life, My Heart Has Yearned for a Thing I Cannot Name".
- Hallie, portrayed by Eden Rose, is the character in Lexi's play based on Cassie. She appears in "The Theater and Its Double" and "All My Life, My Heart Has Yearned for a Thing I Cannot Name".
- Marta, portrayed by Izabella Alvarez, is the character in Lexi's play based on Maddy. She appears in "The Theater and Its Double" and "All My Life, My Heart Has Yearned for a Thing I Cannot Name".
- Luna, portrayed by Isabella Amara, is the character in Lexi's play based on Kat. She appears in "The Theater and Its Double" and "All My Life, My Heart Has Yearned for a Thing I Cannot Name".

Introduced in season 3

- Angel Martinez, portrayed by Priscilla Delgado, is a stripper employed by Alamo at the Silver Slipper. She is also a brief lover of Rue, who spirals when she learns her friend Tish died from an overdose. Angel is then forced into rehab, and later disappears. She appears in "America My Dream".
- Katelyn Adreans, portrayed by Bella Podaras, is an influencer and Maddy's first client. She appears in "America My Dream" and "Kitty Likes to Dance".
- Vivian, portrayed by Cailyn Rice, is Jules' roommate. She appears in "America My Dream" and "The Ballad of Paladin".
- Mama Brown, portrayed by Danielle Deadwyler, is Alamo's mother and a con artist. She appears in "Stand Still and See".
- Preston, portrayed by Kwame Patterson, is Mama Brown's kind-hearted boyfriend who was heavily scarred during an incident at a chemical factory and whom Mama Brown scammed out of his lawsuit money. He appears in "Stand Still and See".
- Hooker, portrayed by Natasha Lyonne, is a prostitute hired by Ali. She appears in "Rain or Shine".

=== Co-stars ===
Introduced in season 1

- Barbara "BB" Brooks, portrayed by Sophia Rose Wilson, is a high school friend of Maddy, Rue, Lexi, Kat, and Cassie. She is prone to gossip and causes drama, as evidenced by her encouragement of Maddy to confront Cassie physically. In the third season, she is revealed to be pregnant at Nate and Cassie's wedding.
- Troy McKay, portrayed by Tyler Timmons (season 1), is one of McKay's younger twin brothers, who got Gia involved with drugs.
- Roy McKay, portrayed by Tristan Timmons (season 1), is one of McKay's younger twin brothers, who got Gia involved with drugs.
- Theodore "Ted" Perez, portrayed by Ruben Dario (season 1), is Maddy's alcoholic father.
- Mouse, portrayed by Meeko (seasons 1–2), is Fez's supplier. In the second season, Mouse goes to Fezco seeking money and is killed by Ashtray, who bludgeons him to death with a hammer.
- Miss Marsha, portrayed by Marsha Gambles, is a server at Frank's diner.
- Marie O'Neill, portrayed by Brynda Mattox (seasons 1–2) and Kathrine Narducci (middle-aged adult, "Trying to Get to Heaven Before They Close the Door"), is Fez's grandmother who he looks after as she became bedridden.

Introduced in season 2

- Bruce Sr., portrayed by Melvin "Bonez" Estes (seasons 2–3), is Laurie's right-hand man. At the end of the third season, he is incarcerated after Laurie's compound is raided by the DEA.
- Mitchel "Mitch" Bilster, portrayed by Daeg Faerch (seasons 2–3), is a drug dealer working for Laurie. At the end of the third season, he is incarcerated after Laurie's compound is raided by the DEA.
- Caleb, portrayed by Ansel Pierce (season 2), is a student at East Highland High School. He is first seen using the toilet while Cassie is hiding from Maddy in the bath, and is later seen in the audience of Lexi's play.
- Theo, portrayed by Yukon Clement (season 2), is Samantha's child who Maddy babysits.
- Sebastian, portrayed by Fernando Belo (season 2), is Theo's father and Samantha's husband.
- Bobbi, portrayed by Veronica Taylor (season 2), is an acquaintance of Lexi's who helps develop her play and acts as Lexi's right-hand. Following Cassie's interruption of the play, Bobbi comforts Lexi and convinces her to carry on by claiming that the play isn't boring and that in the history of East Highland High School, no other play has incurred a riot.
- Leslie's Mom, portrayed by Gwen Mukes (season 2), is Leslie's elderly mother and Rue and Gia's grandmother.

Introduced in season 3

- Daisy Miller, portrayed by Jessica Treska (season 3), is a religious teenager who lives on a farm in Texas.
- Juana, portrayed by Minerva Garcia (season 3), is Nate and Cassie's housekeeper who also helps Cassie make content by filming for her, before Cassie starts working with Maddy.
- Kurt, portrayed by Christopher Grove (season 3), is an investor in Nate's business.
- Tish, portrayed by Emma Kotos (season 3), is a stripper employed by Alamo at the Silver Slipper. She overdoses and dies from laced drugs supplied by Laurie.
- Batman, portrayed by Eli Roth (season 3), is a man cosplaying as Batman who takes an Uber ride from Rue.
- Fred, portrayed by Justin Sintic (season 3), is Heather's husband and Nate's friend.
- Smilez, portrayed by Jack "Smilez" Bruno (season 3), is a musician acquainted with Maddy.
- Bowman, portrayed by William "Bill" Bodner (season 3), is a DEA agent and Jimenez's partner.
- Meredith, portrayed by Meredith Mickelson (season 3), is a model.
- Ricky D, portrayed by Vinnie Hacker (season 3), is a social media influencer.
- Video Podcast Host, portrayed by Trisha Paytas (season 3), is a podcaster.
- Ammanuel, portrayed by Christopher Ammanuel (season 3), is an addict in Ali's support group. He eventually relapses and dies from his addiction.
- Christina "Tina", portrayed by Amelia Hammer Harris (season 3), is a stripper employed by Alamo at the Silver Slipper.
