= Nika King =

American actress

- Born: Shenika Williams
- Other name: Nika Williams
- Education: Miami Carol City Senior High School
- Alma mater: University of Florida
- Occupations: Actress; comedian
- Years active: 2002–present

Shenika Williams, known professionally as Nika King, is an American actress and comedian. She is best known for her role as Leslie Bennett on the HBO television series Euphoria (2019–2026). After starting her acting career in 2002, King moved to Los Angeles and became a stand-up comedian.

== Early life ==
King has five siblings. She grew up in Miami and, when King was a child, her parents and uncle were addicted to drugs. She attended Miami Carol City Senior High School, where she was president of her class, and graduated from University of Florida with a degree in theater. King briefly lived in New York City to become an actor, but soon moved back to Miami due to feeling overwhelmed. She then worked as a drama and dance teacher and a basketball coach at Miami Carol City Senior High School for two years. Although she initially planned to quit after her first year, she decided to stay for another year after the September 11 attacks.

== Career ==
While in Miami, King made her first acting appearance in the television movie Miss Miami in 2002, where she played the chief of police. After quitting her job as a teacher, King moved to Los Angeles to pursue acting full-time and enrolled at The Groundlings School. She performed with Elite Delta Force 3, an all-Black female sketch comedy group, before transitioning into stand-up comedy. She had a recurring role on the OWN television series Greenleaf from 2016 to 2017 as Ramona Chapman. She also made guest appearances on various television series, including 2 Broke Girls, Hannah Montana, Best Friends Whenever, and NCIS: Los Angeles.

In 2019, King began starring in the HBO teen drama television series Euphoria as Leslie Bennett, the widowed single mother of teenage drug addict Rue Bennett and Rue's sister, Gia. Sam Levinson, the show's creator, envisioned Leslie as a representation of his own mother. King originally joined the cast of the series in a supporting role, but was soon given a leading role. For her role on the show, she drew on experiences her mother had when she was addicted to drugs and worked with a private acting coach. She signed a contract with Paradigm Talent Agency for representation in 2020, and signed a contract with Wonder Street for management in 2022. She directed the upcoming short film For Sale.

At the beginning of the COVID-19 pandemic, King launched the startup Jeli Life, an online mentorship program for marginalized communities in the entertainment industry. She also founded the 501(c)(3) organization Rose of Sharon, which focuses on improving mental health in the Black community.

== Personal life ==
King's mother is a three-time cancer survivor.

== Filmography ==
†	Denotes projects that have not yet been released

=== Film ===
Year	Title	Role	Notes
2002	Miss Miami	Chief of Police	
2004	50 First Dates	Salon Patron	
2006	Living the Dream	Candy	
2007	Universal Remote	Woman arguing	
2008	Nora's Hair Salon II	Client #1	
2009	B-Girl	Serena	
2013	Noise Matters	Tracy	
2014	American Weapon	Kia	
2023	65	Nevine's mom	
2024	Sound of Hope: The Story of Possum Trot	Donna Martin	

=== Television ===
Year	Title	Role	Notes
2003	CSI: Miami	Delicious	Episode: "Body Count"
2006	Wild 'N Out	Herself	Episode: "Wayne Brady"
2006	All of Us	Clarinetta	Episode: "Domo Arigato, Mr. Roberto"
2006	Hannah Montana	Coach Lewis	Episode: "Mascot Love"
2007	Nick Cannon Presents: Short Circuitz	Actress	Episode: "Episode #1.3"
2009	iCarly	Pretend MMA Fighter #1	Episode: "iFight Shelby Marx"
2010	Castle	Angel Santana	Episode: "The Late Shaft"
2011	Glory Daze	Stewardess Kim	Episode: "Some Like It Hot Tub"
2011	Modern Family	Shopper	Episode: "Go Bullfrogs!"
2012	Partners	Danni	Episode: "Pilot"
2013	The First Family	Bailiff Ziggy	Episode: "The First Trial"
2013	Stevie TV	Various	2 episodes
2013	2 Broke Girls	Veronica	Episode: "And the Cronuts"
2016	NCIS: Los Angeles	Clementine	Episode: "Granger, O."
2016	Best Friends Whenever	Detective Zoe Walters	Episode: "Working Nine to Fudge"
2016–2017	Greenleaf	Pastor Ramona Chapman	3 episodes
2018	Laff Mob's Laff Tracks	2018	Episode: "First Class"
2016–2018	Funny Married Stuff	Nika	Main cast, web series, also producer and writer
2019	Kevin Hart's Guide to Black History	Josephine Baker	TV movie
2019–2026	Euphoria	Leslie Bennett	Main cast (seasons 1–2), guest star (season 3); 15 episodes
