= List of awards and nominations received by Euphoria =

List of television series awards

Awards and nominations received by Euphoria
Awards and nominations
Award	Wins	Nominations
AACTA Awards	0	2
American Cinema Editors Awards	0	5
Art Directors Guild Awards	0	2
Artios Awards	1	2
BET Awards	1	3
Black Reel Awards for Television	4	7
British Academy Television Awards	0	1
Camerimage	1	1
Costume Designers Guild Awards	0	3
Critics' Choice Television Awards	1	3
Directors Guild of America Awards	1	1
Dorian Awards	1	7
Fantasporto	0	1
GLAAD Media Awards	0	1
Golden Globe Awards	1	1
Guild of Music Supervisors Awards	1	2
Hollywood Critics Association TV Awards	1	9
Hollywood Music in Media Awards	1	1
Hollywood Professional Association	0	1
Imagen Awards	1	3
Ivor Novello Awards	1	1
Make-Up Artists and Hair Stylists Guild Awards	1	3
MTV MIAW Awards	1	2
MTV Movie & TV Awards	4	8
NAACP Image Awards	0	3
Peabody Awards	0	1
People's Choice Awards	1	4
Primetime Emmy Awards	2	5
Primetime Creative Arts Emmy Awards	7	27
Queerty Awards	1	3
Satellite Awards	1	3
Screen Actors Guild Awards	0	1
Set Decorators Society of America Awards	0	2
TCA Awards	0	1
Writers Guild of America Awards	0	1

Totals (Note: Certain award groups do not simply award one winner. They acknowledge several different recipients, have runners-up, and have third place. Since this is a specific recognition and is different from losing an award, runner-up mentions are considered wins in this award tally. For simplification and to avoid errors, each award in this list has been presumed to have had a prior nomination.)
- Wins: 34
- Nominations: 121

Euphoria is an American teen drama television series created and principally written by Sam Levinson for HBO and based on the Israeli miniseries of the same name created by Ron Leshem. The series' main character is Rue Bennett (Zendaya), a recovering teenage drug addict who struggles to find her place in the world.

The series has been widely acclaimed by critics for its acting, story, visuals, and approach to mature subject matter. Euphoria has been nominated for many awards, including thirty two Primetime Emmy Awards (nine wins), one Golden Globe Award (won), three Critics' Choice Television Awards (one win), one Peabody Award, one Screen Actors Guild Award, one Directors Guild of America Award (won), and one Writers Guild of America Award.

Euphoria was nominated for Primetime Emmy Award for Outstanding Drama Series in 2022. Zendaya was nominated for three Primetime Emmy Award for Outstanding Lead Actress in a Drama Series (won twice), the Golden Globe Award for Best Actress – Television Series Drama, and the Critics' Choice Television Award for Best Actress in a Drama Series, while Sydney Sweeney was nominated for Primetime Emmy Award for Outstanding Supporting Actress in a Drama Series.

== Awards and nominations ==
Award	Year	Category	Nominee(s)	Result	Ref.
AACTA Awards	2022	Audience Choice Award for Best Actor	Jacob Elordi (for season 2)	Nominated	
AACTA Awards	2023	Best Actress in a Series	Zendaya (for season 2)	Nominated	
American Cinema Editors Awards	2020	Best Edited Drama Series	Julio C. Perez IV (for "Pilot")	Nominated	
American Cinema Editors Awards	2021	Best Edited Drama Series	Julio C. Perez IV (for "Trouble Don't Last Always")	Nominated	
American Cinema Editors Awards	2022	Best Edited Drama Series	Julio C. Perez IV and Nikola Boyanov (for "Fuck Anyone Who's Not a Sea Blob")	Nominated	
American Cinema Editors Awards	2023	Best Edited Drama Series	Julio C. Perez IV and Aaron I. Butler (for "Stand Still Like the Hummingbird")	Nominated	
American Cinema Editors Awards	2023	Best Edited Drama Series	Julio C. Perez IV, Laura Zempel, and Nikola Boyanov (for "The Theater and Its Double")	Nominated	
Art Directors Guild Awards	2020	One-Hour Contemporary Single-Camera Series	Kay Lee (for "The Trials and Tribulations of Trying to Pee While Depressed"; "And Salt the Earth Behind You")	Nominated	
Art Directors Guild Awards	2023	One-Hour Contemporary Single-Camera Series	Jason Baldwin-Stewart (for "You Who Cannot See, Think of Those Who Can"; "The Theater and Its Double"; "All My Life, My Heart Has Yearned for a Thing I Cannot Name")	Nominated	
Artios Awards	2021	Television Pilot and First Season – Drama	Mary Vernieu, Jessica Kelly, Jennifer Venditti, and Bret Howe (for "Pilot" and season 1)	Won	
Artios Awards	2023	Outstanding Achievement in Casting – Television Drama Series	Jessica Kelly, Mary Vernieu, Bret Howe, Jennifer Venditti (for season 2)	Nominated	
BET Awards	2020	Best Actress	Zendaya (for season 1 and Spider-Man: Far From Home)	Nominated	
BET Awards	2021	Best Actress	Zendaya (for "Trouble Don't Last Always" and Malcolm & Marie)	Nominated	
BET Awards	2022	Best Actress	Zendaya (for season 2 and Spider-Man: No Way Home)	Won	
Black Reel Awards for Television	2020	Outstanding Actress, Drama Series	Zendaya (for season 1)	Won	
Black Reel Awards for Television	2022	Outstanding Actress, Drama Series	Zendaya (for season 2)	Won	
Black Reel Awards for Television	2022	Outstanding Drama Series	Sam Levinson (for season 2)	Nominated	
Black Reel Awards for Television	2022	Outstanding Guest Actor, Drama Series	Colman Domingo (for season 2)	Won	
Black Reel Awards for Television	2022	Outstanding Original Song	Labrinth, Zendaya, Sam Levinson (for "I'm Tired")	Won	
Black Reel Awards for Television	2022	Outstanding Music Supervision	Jen Malone (for season 2)	Nominated	
Black Reel Awards for Television	2022	Outstanding Musical Score	Labrinth (for Euphoria Season 2 Official Score)	Nominated	
British Academy Television Awards	2020	Best International Programme	Sam Levinson, Ravi Nandan, Kevin Turen, and Drake (for season 1)	Nominated	
Camerimage	2019	TV Pilots Competition	Marcell Rév (for "Pilot")	Won	
Costume Designers Guild Awards	2021	Excellence in Contemporary Television	Heidi Bivens (for "Trouble Don't Last Always")	Nominated	
Costume Designers Guild Awards	2022	Excellence in Contemporary Television	Heidi Bivens (for "Fuck Anyone Who's Not a Sea Blob")	Nominated	
Costume Designers Guild Awards	2023	Excellence in Contemporary Television	Heidi Bivens (for "Trying to Get to Heaven Before They Close the Door")	Nominated	
Critics' Choice Television Awards	2020	Best Actress in a Drama Series	Zendaya (for season 1)	Nominated	
Critics' Choice Television Awards	2023	Best Actress in a Drama Series	Zendaya (for season 2)	Won	
Critics' Choice Television Awards	2023	Best Drama Series	Season 2	Nominated	
Directors Guild of America Awards	2023	Outstanding Directorial Achievement in a Drama Series	Sam Levinson (for "Stand Still Like the Hummingbird")	Won	
Dorian Awards	2022	Best TV Performance	Zendaya (for season 2)	Nominated	
Dorian Awards	2022	Best Supporting TV Performance	Sydney Sweeney (for season 2)	Nominated	
Dorian Awards	2022	Campiest TV Show	Season 2	Nominated	
Dorian Awards	2022	Most Visually Striking Show	Season 2	Won	
Dorian Awards	2026	Most Visually Striking Show	Season 3	Nominated	
Dorian Awards	2026	Best TV Performance - Drama	Zendaya (for season 3)	Nominated	
Dorian Awards	2026	Best Supporting TV Performance - Drama	Colman Domingo (for season 3)	Nominated	
Fantasporto	2020	Best International Series or Mini-Series in Streaming	Season 1	Nominated	
GLAAD Media Awards	2020	Outstanding Drama Series	Season 1	Nominated	
Golden Globe Awards	2023	Best Actress – Television Series Drama	Zendaya (for season 2)	Won	
Guild of Music Supervisors Awards	2020	Best Music Supervision – Television Drama	Adam Leber and Jen Malone (for season 1)	Won	
Guild of Music Supervisors Awards	2023	Best Music Supervision – Television Drama	Adam Leber and Jen Malone (for season 2)	Nominated	
Hollywood Critics Association TV Awards	2021	Best Actor in a Limited Series, Anthology Series or Television Movie	Colman Domingo (for "Trouble Don't Last Always")	Won	
Hollywood Critics Association TV Awards	2021	Best Actress in a Limited Series, Anthology Series or Television Movie	Zendaya (for "Trouble Don't Last Always")	Nominated	
Hollywood Critics Association TV Awards	2021	Best Broadcast Network or Cable Limited Series, Anthology Series or Live-Action Television Movie	Specials	Nominated	
Hollywood Critics Association TV Awards	2022	Best Cable Series, Drama	Season 2	Nominated	
Hollywood Critics Association TV Awards	2022	Best Actress in a Broadcast Network or Cable Series, Drama	Zendaya (for season 2)	Nominated	
Hollywood Critics Association TV Awards	2022	Best Supporting Actor in a Broadcast Network or Cable Series, Drama	Eric Dane (for season 2)	Nominated	
Hollywood Critics Association TV Awards	2022	Best Supporting Actress in a Broadcast Network or Cable Series, Drama	Sydney Sweeney (for season 2)	Nominated	
Hollywood Critics Association TV Awards	2022	Best Directing in a Broadcast Network or Cable Series, Drama	Sam Levinson (for "Stand Still Like the Hummingbird")	Nominated	
Hollywood Critics Association TV Awards	2022	Best Writing in a Broadcast Network or Cable Series, Drama	Sam Levinson (for "Stand Still Like the Hummingbird")	Nominated	
Hollywood Music in Media Awards	2021	Best Original Song in a TV Show/Limited Series	Labrinth (for "All for Us")	Won	
Hollywood Professional Association	2022	Outstanding Sound – Television	Wylie Stateman, Anne Jimkes, Austin Roth, Beso Kacharava, Bryant J. Fuhrmann (for "Stand Still Like the Hummingbird")	Nominated	
Imagen Awards	2021	Best Supporting Actor – Television (Drama)	Colman Domingo (for "Trouble Don't Last Always")	Won	
Imagen Awards	2022	Best Primetime Program – Drama	Season 2	Nominated	
Imagen Awards	2022	Best Supporting Actress – Drama (Television)	Alexa Demie (for season 2)	Nominated	
Ivor Novello Awards	2020	Best Television Soundtrack	Labrinth (for Euphoria (Original Score from the HBO Series))	Won	
Make-Up Artists and Hair Stylists Guild Awards	2020	Contemporary Makeup in a Television Series	Doniella Davy and Kristen Coleman (for season 1)	Nominated	
Make-Up Artists and Hair Stylists Guild Awards	2021	Best Contemporary Hair Styling in a Special	Melanie Smith and Kaity Licina (for "Trouble Don't Last Always")	Nominated	
Make-Up Artists and Hair Stylists Guild Awards	2023	Contemporary Makeup in a Television Series	Doniella Davy, Tara Lang Shah, Alexandra J. French (for season 2)	Won	
MTV MIAW Awards	2021	Music-Ship of the Year	Billie Eilish and Rosalía (for "Lo Vas a Olvidar")	Nominated	
MTV MIAW Awards	2022	Killer Series	Season 2	Won	
MTV Movie & TV Awards	2022	Best Show	Season 2	Won	
MTV Movie & TV Awards	2022	Here For The Hookup	Season 2	Won	
MTV Movie & TV Awards	2022	Best Performance in a Show	Zendaya (for season 2)	Won	
MTV Movie & TV Awards	2022	Best Performance in a Show	Sydney Sweeney (for season 2)	Nominated	
MTV Movie & TV Awards	2022	Best Kiss	Hunter Schafer and Dominic Fike	Nominated	
MTV Movie & TV Awards	2022	Best Fight	"Cassie vs. Maddy"	Won	
MTV Movie & TV Awards	2022	Best Song	Dominic Fike (for "Elliot's Song")	Nominated	
MTV Movie & TV Awards	2022	Best Musical Moment	Bonnie Tyler (for "Holding Out for a Hero")	Nominated	
NAACP Image Awards	2023	Outstanding Drama Series	Season 2	Nominated	
NAACP Image Awards	2023	Outstanding Actress in a Drama Series	Zendaya (for season 2)	Nominated	
NAACP Image Awards	2023	Outstanding Guest Actor or Actress in a Television Series	Colman Domingo (for season 2)	Nominated	
Peabody Awards	2021	Entertainment	"Trouble Don't Last Always"	Nominated	
People's Choice Awards	2019	Favorite Drama TV Star	Zendaya (for season 1)	Won	
People's Choice Awards	2022	The Drama Show of 2022	Season 2	Nominated	
People's Choice Awards	2022	The Drama TV Star of 2022	Zendaya (for season 2)	Nominated	
People's Choice Awards	2022	The Drama TV Star of 2022	Sydney Sweeney (for season 2)	Nominated	
Primetime Emmy Awards	2020	Outstanding Lead Actress in a Drama Series	Zendaya (for "Made You Look")	Won	
Primetime Emmy Awards	2022	Outstanding Lead Actress in a Drama Series	Zendaya (for "Stand Still Like the Hummingbird")	Won	
Primetime Emmy Awards	2022	Outstanding Drama Series	Sam Levinson, Kevin Turen, Ravi Nandan, Drake, Adel "Future" Nur, Zendaya, Will Greenfield, Ashley Levinson, Kenneth Yu, Harrison Kreiss, Ron Leshem and Hadas Moses Lichtenstein (for season 2)	Nominated	
Primetime Emmy Awards	2022	Outstanding Supporting Actress in a Drama Series	Sydney Sweeney (for "Ruminations: Big and Little Bullys")	Nominated	
Primetime Emmy Awards	2026	Outstanding Lead Actress in a Drama Series	Zendaya (for "In God We Trust")	Nominated	
Primetime Creative Arts Emmy Awards	2020	Outstanding Makeup for a Single-Camera Series (Non-Prosthetic)	Doniella Davy, Kirsten Sage Coleman, and Tara Lang Shah (for "And Salt the Earth Behind You")	Won	
Primetime Creative Arts Emmy Awards	2020	Outstanding Music Composition for a Series (Original Dramatic Score)	Labrinth (for "'03 Bonnie and Clyde")	Nominated	
Primetime Creative Arts Emmy Awards	2020	Outstanding Music Supervision	Jen Malone and Adam Leber (for "And Salt the Earth Behind You")	Nominated	
Primetime Creative Arts Emmy Awards	2020	Outstanding Original Music and Lyrics	Labrinth (for song: "All for Us) (for "And Salt the Earth Behind You")	Won	
Primetime Creative Arts Emmy Awards	2020	Outstanding Contemporary Costumes	Heidi Bivens, Danielle Baker, and Katina Danabassis (for "The Next Episode")	Nominated	
Primetime Creative Arts Emmy Awards	2021	Outstanding Contemporary Costumes	Heidi Bivens, Devon Patterson, and Angelina Vitto (for "Fuck Anyone Who's Not a Sea Blob")	Nominated	
Primetime Creative Arts Emmy Awards	2021	Outstanding Makeup for a Single-Camera Series (Non-Prosthetic)	Doniella Davy and Tara Lang Shah (for "Fuck Anyone Who's Not a Sea Blob")	Nominated	
Primetime Creative Arts Emmy Awards	2021	Outstanding Cinematography for a Single-Camera Series (One Hour)	Marcell Rév (for "Trouble Don't Last Always")	Nominated	
Primetime Creative Arts Emmy Awards	2022	Outstanding Cinematography for a Single-Camera Series (One Hour)	Marcell Rév (for "The Theater and Its Double")	Won	
Primetime Creative Arts Emmy Awards	2022	Outstanding Casting for a Drama Series	Jessica Kelly, Mary Vernieu, Bret Howe, and Jennifer Venditti (for season 2)	Nominated	
Primetime Creative Arts Emmy Awards	2022	Outstanding Choreography for Scripted Programming	Ryan Heffington (for routines: "Call Me Irresponsible/Holding Out for a Hero/Cheerleader") (for "Ruminations: Big and Little Bullys" and "The Theater and Its Double")	Won	
Primetime Creative Arts Emmy Awards	2022	Outstanding Contemporary Costumes	Heidi Bivens, Devon Patterson, and Angelina Vito (for "Trying to Get to Heaven Before They Close the Door")	Nominated	
Primetime Creative Arts Emmy Awards	2022	Outstanding Contemporary Hairstyling	Kimberly Kimble, Kendra Garvey, Patricia Vecchio, and Teresita Mariscal (for "The Theater and Its Double")	Nominated	
Primetime Creative Arts Emmy Awards	2022	Outstanding Makeup (Non-Prosthetic)	Doniella Davy, Tara Lang Shah, Alex French (for "The Theater and Its Double")	Won	
Primetime Creative Arts Emmy Awards	2022	Outstanding Guest Actress in a Drama Series	Martha Kelly (for "Stand Still Like the Hummingbird")	Nominated	
Primetime Creative Arts Emmy Awards	2022	Outstanding Music Supervision	Jen Malone and Adam Leber (for "Trying to Get to Heaven Before They Close the Door")	Nominated	
Primetime Creative Arts Emmy Awards	2022	Outstanding Original Music and Lyrics	Labrinth, Muzhda Zemar-McKenzie, Zendaya (for "Elliot's Song") (for "All My Life, My Heart Has Yearned for a Thing I Cannot Name")	Nominated	
Primetime Creative Arts Emmy Awards	2022	Outstanding Original Music and Lyrics	Labrinth, Zendaya, Sam Levinson (for song: "I'm Tired") (for "You Who Cannot See, Think of Those Who Can")	Nominated	
Primetime Creative Arts Emmy Awards	2022	Outstanding Picture Editing for a Drama Series	Laura Zempel, Julio C. Perez IV, Nikola Boyanov, and Aaron I. Butler (for "The Theater and Its Double")	Won	
Primetime Creative Arts Emmy Awards	2022	Outstanding Sound Mixing for a Comedy or Drama Series (One Hour)	Anne Jimkes-Root, Chris David, Austin Roth, and Sean O'Malley (for "Stand Still Like the Hummingbird")	Nominated	
Primetime Creative Arts Emmy Awards	2022	Outstanding Guest Actor in a Drama Series	Colman Domingo (for "Ruminations: Big and Little Bullys")	Won	
Primetime Creative Arts Emmy Awards	2026	Outstanding Guest Actor in a Drama Series	Colman Domingo (for "In God We Trust")	Nominated	
Primetime Creative Arts Emmy Awards	2026	Outstanding Cinematography for a Series (One Hour)	Marcell Rév (for "In God We Trust")	Nominated	
Primetime Creative Arts Emmy Awards	2026	Outstanding Picture Editing for a Drama Series	Nikola Boyanov, Aleshka Ferrero, Aaron I. Butler, Julio C. Perez IV and Kristin Valentine (for "In God We Trust")	Nominated	
Primetime Creative Arts Emmy Awards	2026	Outstanding Production Design for a Narrative Contemporary Program (One Hour or More)	François Audouy, A. Todd Holland and Anthony Carlino (for "This Little Piggy")	Nominated	
Primetime Creative Arts Emmy Awards	2026	Outstanding Contemporary Hairstyling	Kimberly Kimble, Kendra Garvey, Kase Glenn, Marquita Lynch, and Stacy Schneiderman (for "The Ballad of Paladin")	Nominated	
Primetime Creative Arts Emmy Awards	2026	Outstanding Contemporary Makeup (Non-Prosthetic)	Doniella Davy, Mara Rouse, Tara Lang Shah and Leah Rial Sappington (for "Kitty Likes to Dance")	Nominated	
Queerty Awards	2020	TV Series	Season 1	Nominated	
Queerty Awards	2020	TV Performance	Barbie Ferreira (for season 1)	Nominated	
Queerty Awards	2023	TV Drama	Season 2	Won	
Satellite Awards	2019	Best Actress – Television Series Drama	Zendaya (for season 1)	Won	
Satellite Awards	2021	Best Actress – Television Film	Zendaya (for "Trouble Don't Last Always")	Nominated	
Satellite Awards	2023	Best Actress in a Drama / Genre Series	Zendaya (for season 2)	Nominated	
Screen Actors Guild Awards	2023	Outstanding Performance by a Female Actor in a Drama Series	Zendaya (for season 2)	Nominated	
Set Decorators Society of America Awards	2021	Best Achievement in Decor/Design of a One Hour Contemporary Series	Julia Altschul, Jason Baldwin Stewart (for season 1)	Nominated	
Set Decorators Society of America Awards	2026	Best Achievement in Decor/Design of a One Hour Contemporary Series	Anthony Carlino and François Audouy (for season 3)	Nominated	
TCA Awards	2020	Outstanding Achievement in Drama	Season 1	Nominated	
Writers Guild of America Awards	2021	Television: Episodic Drama	Sam Levinson (for "Trouble Don't Last Always")	Nominated	

== See also ==
- List of Primetime Emmy Awards received by HBO
