= Kitty Likes to Dance =

- Euphoria episode
- Rue Bennett is arrested by the DEA.
- Episode no.: Season 3 Episode 4
- Directed by: Sam Levinson
- Written by: Sam Levinson
- Cinematography by: Marcell Rév
- Editing by: Nikola Boyanov; Aaron I. Butler; Aleshka Ferrero; Julio C. Perez IV
- Original air date: May 3, 2026
- Running time: 61 minutes

Guest appearances
- Sharon Stone as Patricia Lance; Colleen Camp as LA Nights Director; Rosalía as Magick; Marshawn Lynch as G; Darrell Britt-Gibson as Bishop; James Landry Hébert as Harley; Gideon Adlon as Gillie; Kadeem Hardison as Big Eddy; Hemky Madera as Jimenez; Anna Van Patten as Kitty; Asante Blackk as Kidd; Bella Podaras as Katelyn Adreans; Jeff Wahlberg as Brandon Fontaine; Madison Thompson as Oceana; Jewell Farshad as Penelope

Episode chronology
← Previous "The Ballad of Paladin"	Next → "This Little Piggy"
- Euphoria season 3

"Kitty Likes to Dance" is the fourth episode of the third season of the American psychological drama television series Euphoria. The episode was written and directed by series creator Sam Levinson. It originally aired on HBO on May 3, 2026.

The episode's cold open depicts Rue Bennett (Zendaya) being arrested by Drug Enforcement Administration. In the episode proper, she becomes an informant for the DEA. Meanwhile, Cassie Jacobs (Sydney Sweeney) leaves her husband Nate's (Jacob Elordi) home to pursue OnlyFans fame under Maddy Perez's (Alexa Demie) management.

"Kitty Likes to Dance" received largely mixed reviews. Out of the seven Primetime Emmy Award nominations received by the show for its third season, one was specifically for this episode, Outstanding Makeup (Non-Prosthetic).

== Plot ==
Rue Bennett (Zendaya) is pulled over by a Drug Enforcement Administration car searching for her. After being arrested, she is interrogated by detectives Bowman and Jimenez (Hemky Madera). They give her two choices: go to federal prison for life or become an informant. Alamo Brown (Adewale Akinnuoye-Agbaje) introduces Rue to new Silver Slipper dancer Kitty (Anna Van Patten). Nate Jacobs' (Jacob Elordi) toe has been stitched back on. His wife Cassie (Sydney Sweeney) packs her bags and leaves with her manager Maddy Perez (Alexa Demie).

Jules Vaughn (Hunter Schafer) is commissioned by Cassie's sister Lexi Howard (Maude Apatow) to create a painting for the soap opera she works for, LA Nights. Jules parodies A Sunday Afternoon on the Island of La Grande Jatte with naked figures that have both breasts and penises. LA Nights director (Colleen Camp) and producer Patricia Lance (Sharon Stone) are appalled and ask her to give the women clothes. Patricia scolds Lexi for wasting production's time and money. Jules destroys her painting. Harley (James Landry Hébert) and his son Wayne (Toby Wallace) plot revenge for Alamo's murder of their cousin Laurie's (Martha Kelly) cockatoo.

Jimenez pressures Rue to set up a drug deal, but Alamo has cut off Laurie. Rue asks Maddy for help, who is filming Cassie's OnlyFans content; Maddy refuses. Lexi watches all three and chastises them for their career choices. Nate pleads with the planning and zoning commission to allow him to build end-of-life care facilities despite the environmental protection of the white fritillary. Cassie moves into Lexi's apartment complex. Rue plays a tense game of poker with Alamo, Bishop (Darrell Britt-Gibson), and G (Marshawn Lynch) while Bowman and Jimenez wiretap her phone and listen in. Alamo is suspicious, but she lies that she is using hard drugs to throw him off the scent.

Maddy brings Cassie to a house party thrown by influencer Brandon Fontaine (Jeff Wahlberg), with the goal to tempt him with sex so she can take a photo with him that will boost her online fame. Meanwhile, Kitty is raped by four men in a private room, which Rue watches on the CCTV. Cassie encounters Maddy's former client Katelyn Adreans. Brandon takes a liking to Cassie and Katelyn and brings them to his bedroom. All three snort cocaine off of each other's navels. Katelyn has a bad reaction and just as Brandon tries to have sex with Cassie, Maddy breaks in with a camera crew and snaps a photo of them.

Rue asks Kitty if she is being forced into sex work. Kitty simply replies she likes to dance. Magick (Rosalía), a stripper wearing a cervical collar to win a personal injury lawsuit, tells club manager Big Eddy (Kadeem Hardison) that Rue is a snitch. Jimenez calls and tells her she is compromised and needs to discredit Magick. Harley and Wayne raid the Silver Slipper. They hold Rue and Magick hostage until Eddy opens the safe, but he refuses and they shoot him in the stomach. He opens the safe, they rob everything inside and drive away. Rue recognizes the getaway driver as Faye Valentine (Chloe Cherry).

== Production ==
=== Writing ===
The title of this episode is reference to when Kitty says "I like to dance" after her rape. Series creator Sam Levinson wrote the episode, including its opening scene which depicts federal agents legally lying to Rue in a interrogation. Speaking to HBO Max, Bowman's actor Bill Bodner, who is the former head of the DEA in Los Angeles, said "Everything in this show, it's just extremely accurate portrayal of the drug world. So intimidating, right? Because I've never really acted before. And to show up on set the first day, my very first scene to work ten-and-a-half hours."

=== Filming ===
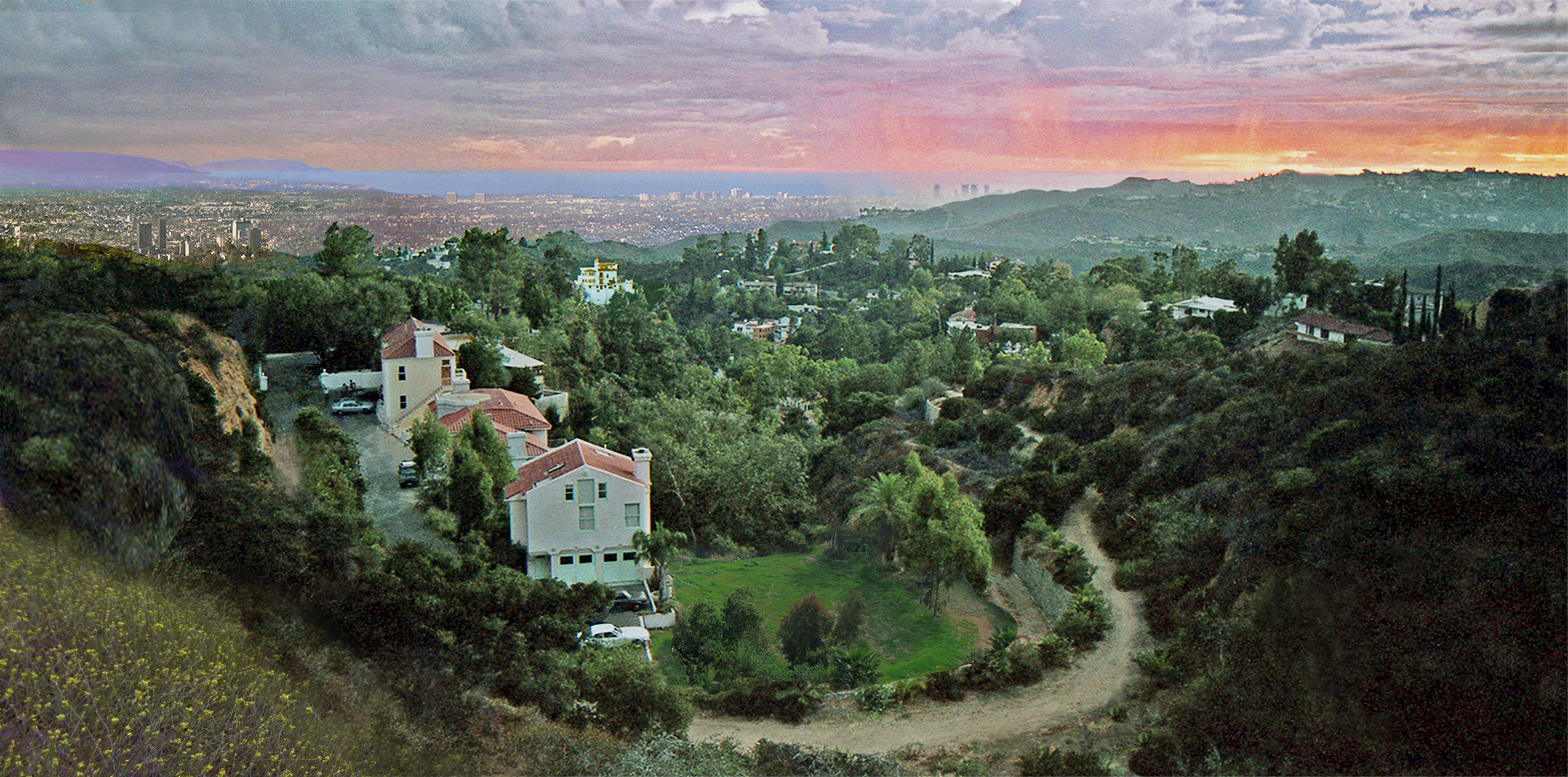
The Hollywood Hills were used as a filming location for the episode.

Location shooting for Brandon's content house took place at a $58 Million seven-bedroom estate in the Hollywood Hills that overlooks LA. When Maddy gives Cassie a makeover, series makeup artist Doniella Davy, hair stylist Kimberly Kimble, and season 3 costume designer Natasha Newman-Thomas all make cameo appearances. Wayne and Harley wear balaclavas with Barack Obama's face on. In an official behind-the-scenes video uploaded to YouTube, Harley's actor Landry Hébert described the filming experience: "We had ski masks on and we were sweating bullets. [...] Nobody really knew where to stand, and Sam goes, 'Let me see the gun.' And he hops up on the desk and points it down and acted the whole beat out himself. It was fearless and specific, and suddenly it clicked. Influencer and model Vinnie Hacker makes a brief cameo in the episode, although Hacker claims he initially had a bigger role. Kitty's actress Van Patten said intimacy coordinator Mam Smith made her and the male actors feel safe during filming of the private room shots.

=== Music ===
"Whatchu Kno About Me" by GloRilla and Sexyy Red plays in the Silver Slipper in the episode. The closing credits are set to "Cold as Ice" by M.O.P..

== Reception ==
=== Ratings ===
According to Nielsen Media Research, upon airing "Kitty Likes to Dance" was watched by 387,000 people. They estimated that 0.08% of the total 18-49 population in the US was tuning in.

=== Critical reviews ===
The review aggregator website Metacritic, which uses a weighted average, assigned a score of 76 out of 100, based on five user ratings. In a B− review for The A.V. Club, Emma Fraser wrote that "Zendaya is terrific as Euphoria still struggles to find its footing", adding that "[the episode] dials up the sex, drugs, and money horrors as it continues to unpack the American dream." In a three out of five star review for Vulture, Rafaela Bassili wrote that "Zendaya puts up a valiant effort to infuse Rue’s new situation with emotion, but it’s not enough to make up for the fact that Rue, while Euphoria’s protagonist, has become passive in her own plot."

=== Accolades ===
The episode was Euphoria makeup artists Doniella Davy, Mara Rouse, Tara Lang Shah and Leah Rial Sappington's submission at the 78th Primetime Creative Arts Emmy Awards, leading them to a nomination for the Primetime Emmy Award for Outstanding Makeup (Non-Prosthetic).
