= The Ballad of Paladin (Euphoria) =

- Euphoria episode
- Cassie Jacobs cries as Nate is assaulted.
- Episode no.: Season 3 Episode 3
- Directed by: Sam Levinson
- Written by: Sam Levinson
- Cinematography by: Marcell Rév
- Editing by: Nikola Boyanov; Aaron I. Butler; Aleshka Ferrero; Julio C. Perez IV
- Original air date: April 26, 2026
- Running time: 59 minutes

Guest appearances
- Rosalía as Magick; Alanna Ubach as Suze Howard; Paula Marshall as Marsha Jacobs; Darrell Britt-Gibson as Bishop; James Landry Hébert as Harley; Sam Trammell as Ellis; Kadeem Hardison as Big Eddy; Hemky Madera as Jimenez; Zak Steiner as Aaron Jacobs; Jessica Blair Herman as Heather; Jack Topalian as Naz; Matt Willig as Artur; Cailyn Rice as Vivian; Jewell Farshad as Penelope

Episode chronology
← Previous "America My Dream"	Next → "Kitty Likes to Dance"
- Euphoria season 3

"The Ballad of Paladin" is the third episode of the third season of the American psychological drama television series Euphoria. The episode was written and directed by series creator Sam Levinson. It originally aired on HBO on April 26, 2026. The title of this episode is a reference to the 1958 song of the same name by American musician Johnny Western.

The episode's cold open depicts former teenager Jules Vaughn (Hunter Schafer) in the years after graduation, dropping out of art school to start sugar dating, before eventually abandoning all her other clients to focus solely on Ellis (Sam Trammell). In the episode proper, Cassie Howard (Sydney Sweeney) and Nate Jacobs (Jacob Elordi) hold a gaudy wedding, which Rue Bennett (Zendaya) leaves early to make a drug deal with Laurie (Martha Kelly).

"The Ballad of Paladin" received largely mixed reviews. Out of the seven Primetime Emmy Award nominations received by the show for its third season, one was specifically for this episode, Outstanding Hairstyling.

== Plot ==
After graduating from high school, Jules Vaughn (Hunter Schafer) attends art college. Her roommate Vivian introduces her to sugar dating, through which Jules meets wealthy plastic surgeon Ellis (Sam Trammell). She drops out of school and abandons all her other clients in favor of Ellis. After moving into his penthouse apartment, he mummifies her in plastic wrap.

In the present, Rue Bennett (Zendaya) starts trafficking 3D-printed firearms for Alamo Brown (Adewale Akinnuoye-Agbaje). When she tells him she wants to go "legit", he is offended, pointing out that lotteries used to be illegal. Laurie (Martha Kelly) releases the pig Alamo sent to her home in the Silver Slipper; he shoots the pig and plans to get revenge by killing Paladin, Laurie's pet cockatoo. Rue pays Jules to accompany her to Cassie Howard (Sydney Sweeney) and Nate Jacobs' (Jacob Elordi) wedding. Maddy, Jules, and Rue all attend. Cassie's mother Suze (Alanna Ubach) tells her of her own failed marriage while walking her down the aisle, increasing the bride's nerves.

Rue deserts Jules at the wedding when Alamo's henchman Bishop (Darrell Britt-Gibson) calls. Nate's sex offender father Cal (Eric Dane) tries to justify his statutory rape of Jules and nonconsensual recording of a sex tape to her. During her wedding speech, Nate's mother Marsha (Paula Marshall) chastises Maddy. Nate's loan shark Naz intimidates him and Cassie, revealing his debts to his wife and Cassie's fellow housewife Heather, who immediately informs her husband. Despite both being in emotional turmoil, Cassie and Nate perform a tacky choreographed dance.

Nate tells Heather's husband about the white fritillary, a flower whose environmental protection is preventing his construction business. Nate finds Jules smoking outside. He tells her he did not expect her to come; she admits Maddy left after getting overly emotional. He says people cannot control who they love. Bishop informs Laurie that Alamo wishes to continue purchasing her product, but wants to test all the drugs. Cassie confronts Nate over his lies and accidentally gives him a black eye with a champagne cork. Bishop almost gets caught poisoning Paladin's water. He pays for the drugs and leaves with Rue.

The newlyweds arrive home to find Naz and his enforcer Artur (Matt Willig) there, who assault them, causing Cassie's nose to bleed and beating Nate severely before Naz cuts off his pinky toe with shears. In her car, Rue is pulled over by the Drug Enforcement Administration. Paladin is poisoned and dies.

== Production ==
=== Writing ===
The version of "The Ballad of Paladin" recorded in 1958 by Johnny Western is the origin of the episode's title. This name was chosen to parallel the name of Laurie's cockatoo, who is poisoned by Bishop in the episode. The guns Rue sells in the episode are a Glock 19, Brügger & Thomet APC, and AR-15–style rifle. She also slips $400 in Jules' bra despite being homeless. While driving to the drug deal with Laurie, Rue calls the imprisoned character Fezco O'Neill. The conversation is one sided due to actor Angus Cloud's death before filming. Rue ends to call with "Bless, bless, one love", a phrase Cloud often used to sign off.

=== Filming ===
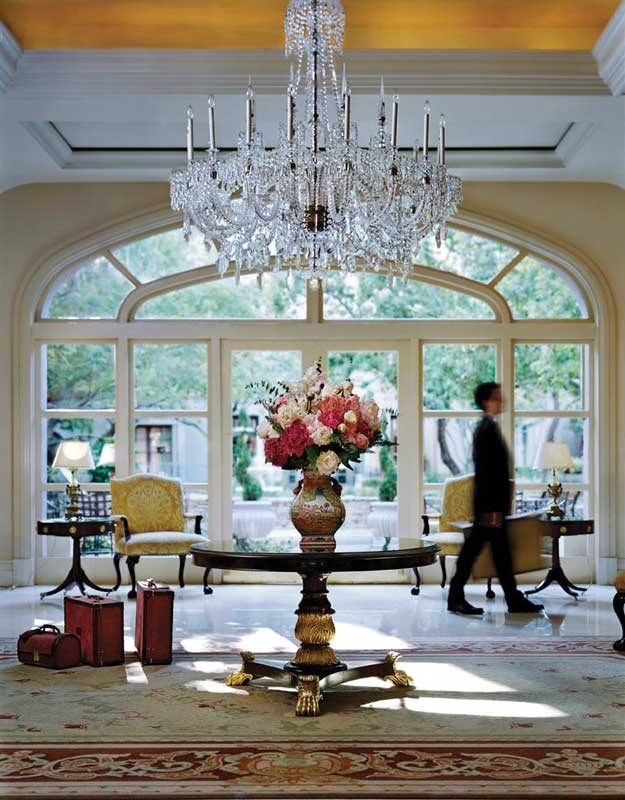
The Langham Huntington, Pasadena was used as a filming location for the episode.

Location shooting for the venue of Cassie and Nate's wedding took place at The Langham Huntington, Pasadena. François Audouy (production designer for season 3) worked with florist companies Flower Song LA and Magpie Floral to procure the decorations for the wedding. Despite the stated $50,000 price tag in the show, Audouy admitted "we spent considerably more than that, the number is kind of shocking and almost embarrassing [...] it was a decision that we all made together because of metaphorical importance of telling the story with the amount of florals, and to Sam’s genius, he folded that into the story where it became part of Cassie’s motivation." Production cleaned out the inventory of all the local farms in Southern California and flew in the rest of the flowers from Miami, Ecuador, and Amsterdam. Audouy recalled that "the entire Los Angeles floral market was without this [shrimp cocktail] palette in stock." In total, the ceremony used 10,710 stems, including 2,875 roses, and the reception used 14,382 stems, including 4,600 roses.

In an official behind-the-scenes video uploaded to YouTube, series choreographer Ryan Heffington spoke on the rehearsal process for Cassie and Nate's wedding dance: "I was so excited to work with [Elordi and Sweeney]. It was nice to create a piece that's a little inappropriate, I guess, for a wedding dance, but I think that's where the humor comes in. It's a little tacky. It's a little like harsh. It's too sexy, but they're, you know, bride and groom that are nervous and they're dancing in front of their friends and they learn this dance." Series makeup artist Doniella Davy brought on Vincent Van Dyke Effects to make facsimiles of Elordi's foot that were rigged to squirt theatrical blood on cue with the cut.

=== Music ===
"Boom Boom Boom" by Fatboy plays in the first Silver Slipper scene of the episode. Cassie and Nate's choreographed dance is set to "She Wears My Ring" by Solomon King. The opening and closing themes to American Western television series Have Gun – Will Travel feature in the episode. The former, composed by Bernard Herrmann, plays over a slow motion shot of Bishop tossing money in the air. The latter, "The Ballad of Paladin", plays over the closing credits and is the second time the title song has played in an episode of Euphoria (the first being "Stuntin' Like My Daddy").

== Reception ==
=== Ratings ===
According to Nielsen Media Research, upon airing "The Ballad of Paladin" was watched by 399,000 people. They estimated that 0.13% of the total 18-49 population in the US was tuning in. Including stats from HBO's streaming service Max, the episode drew 8,900,000 viewers in its first three days of release, the highest of season 3.

=== Critical reviews ===
TVLine gave a "Performer of the Week" honorable mention to Sweeney on May 2, 2026 for her work in this episode. The site wrote "as dire as things got for Cassie, the chaos only propelled Sydney Sweeney to new heights, mixing pitch-black humor with high melodrama as Cassie's dream wedding turned into a gruesome nightmare. Sweeney had us giggling as Cassie let her bridezilla tendencies come out in full force, brushing off everyone else's petty concerns because it's Her. Big. Day." In a B− review for The A.V. Club, Emma Fraser wrote of the episode that "high school might be over in Euphoria, but a wedding between two former classmates provides the ideal opportunity to reunite with friends, exes, and even those you blackmailed. [...] I didn’t expect the nuptials to be here so quickly. Still, Sam Levinson’s HBO drama keeps its propulsive forward momentum by running headlong into a lavish bash that ends in bloody violence. It would have been enough to focus on Nate and Cassie’s big day and the history it dredges up. For one, Jules provides an intriguing counterpoint to Nate and Cassie’s fake suburban dream. Adding Laurie and Alamo’s feud into the mix certainly builds tension on top of the wedding pressure cooker, but "The Ballad of Paladin" is as stretched as Nate’s bank account."

Jen Chaney of Elle compared the episode favourably to Something Very Bad Is Going to Happen and The Drama, other disaster weddings depicted on screen released around the same time, the latter of which starred Zendaya. Josh Rosenberg's review for Esquire complained that the episode lacked "chaos". He added that "the weirdest bit about the wedding is that no one there is really friends with each other anymore. Every character in Euphoria is someone who has no one in their lives who are looking out for them. But even when they’re finally surrounded by the very people they would reach out to for help, no one offers a hand. Maybe they don’t actually want one. But if they’ve resigned to go down with the ship, couldn’t they have at least poked a few more holes into the one event where it would have really counted?" In a three out of five star review for Vulture, Rafaela Bassili called Naz's attack on Nate "a fun set piece, funny and violent and well performed". She added "Euphoria has yet to find its aesthetic groove. Will it be a retro Los Angeles crime-comedy pastiche? Will it be a moody, cynical exploration of sex work? Will it be a drug-cartel, desert thriller?"

=== Accolades ===
The episode was Euphoria hair stylists Kimberly Kimble, Kendra Garvey, Kase Glenn, Marquita Lynch, and Stacy Schneiderman's submission at the 78th Primetime Creative Arts Emmy Awards, leading them to a nomination for the Primetime Emmy Award for Outstanding Hairstyling.
