= The Theater and Its Double =

- Euphoria episode
- Our Life's first moments.
- Episode no.: Season 2 Episode 7
- Directed by: Sam Levinson
- Written by: Sam Levinson
- Cinematography by: Marcell Rév
- Editing by: Julio C. Perez IV; Laura Zempel
- Original air date: February 20, 2022
- Running time: 58 minutes

Guest appearances
- Minka Kelly as Samantha; Alanna Ubach as Suze Howard; Tyler Chase as Custer; Nick Blood as Gus Howard; Aja Bair as Jade; Eden Rose as Hallie; Izabella Alvarez as Marta; Isabella Amara as Luna

Episode chronology
← Previous "A Thousand Little Trees of Blood"	Next → "All My Life, My Heart Has Yearned for a Thing I Cannot Name"
- Euphoria season 2

"The Theater and Its Double" is the seventh episode of the second season of the American teen drama television series Euphoria. The episode was written and directed by series creator Sam Levinson. It originally aired on HBO on February 20, 2022. The title of this episode is a reference to the 1938 essay collection of the same name by French artist Antonin Artaud.

In the episode Lexi Howard (Maude Apatow) puts on a play at her school called Our Life which features fictionalized versions of her family and friends. As said characters react to the play, moments of their past are inter cut with their depictions on stage. This includes Rue Bennett's (Zendaya) father's wake and Lexi's older sister Cassie's (Sydney Sweeney) friendship with Maddy Perez (Alexa Demie).

"The Theater and Its Double" received universal critical acclaim. Out of the sixteen Primetime Emmy Award nominations received by the show for its second season, five were specifically for this episode, resulting in four wins, Outstanding Picture Editing for a Drama Series, Outstanding Makeup for a Single-Camera Series (Non-Prosthetic), Outstanding Cinematography for a Series (One Hour) for Marcell Rév, and the "Holding Out for a Hero" and Cheerleader routines won Outstanding Choreography.

== Plot ==
Lexi Howard's (Maude Apatow) play, Our Life, is performed for East Highland's students, parents, and faculty. It opens with Rue Bennett's (Zendaya) father's wake. Lexi sees Rue snort drugs and reads her a poem. Rue watches from the audience, as does Lexi's sister Cassie (Sydney Sweeney) and her ex-friend Maddy Perez (Alexa Demie); they are disturbed to see satirized versions of themselves on stage, realizing the play is about them. Lexi eagerly awaits for Fezco O'Neill (Angus Cloud) to arrive.

Prior to the showing, Lexi and Fezco discuss the production. Lexi is initially apprehensive, fearful people will misinterpret her intentions, but Fezco reassures her she should proceed with writing. In the present, Custer arrives at Fezco's apartment, intending to record a conversation about Mouse's murder.

During a flashback, a young Lexi and Cassie spend time with their father Gus (Nick Blood) who is high and barely awake. At Rue's father's wake, an emotional Lexi watches as Rue gives a eulogy. In the present, Custer calls Faye Valentine (Chloe Cherry) to relax at Fezco's, causing Ashtray (Javon Walton) to become suspicious. Before the play, Rue ignores her girlfriend Jules Vaughn (Hunter Schafer). In a flashback, Rue's mother Leslie (Nika King) tells Rue she is done dealing with her addiction and plans to focus on her little sister Gia (Storm Reid).

Maddy and Cassie begin to get emotional as their old friendship plays out on stage. In a flashback to the night Rue exposed her relationship with Nate Jacobs (Jacob Elordi), Cassie locks herself in a bathroom as Maddy tearfully demands her to open the door. During the play, Cassie briefly leaves the auditorium to cry to herself; Lexi begins to feel regret about showing the play.

Kat Hernandez's (Barbie Ferreira) secret occupation as a webcam model is depicted in the play. In another series of flashbacks, Nate has a nightmare about his father Cal (Eric Dane) raping him, Jules destroys the recording of her and Cal having sex, and Maddy tells Samantha (Minka Kelly) that she is leaving her babysitting job for her. Concurrent with the play, Custer grows impatient waiting to speak to Fezco.

A musical number in the play characterizes East Highland's high school football team as homoerotic, particularly Nate, who is humiliated. As the audience cheers, Nate storms out, lambasting it as being homophobic. He blames Cassie and breaks up with her. The episode ends with an enraged Cassie staring at the play through a window, breathing on it heavily.

== Production ==
=== Writing ===
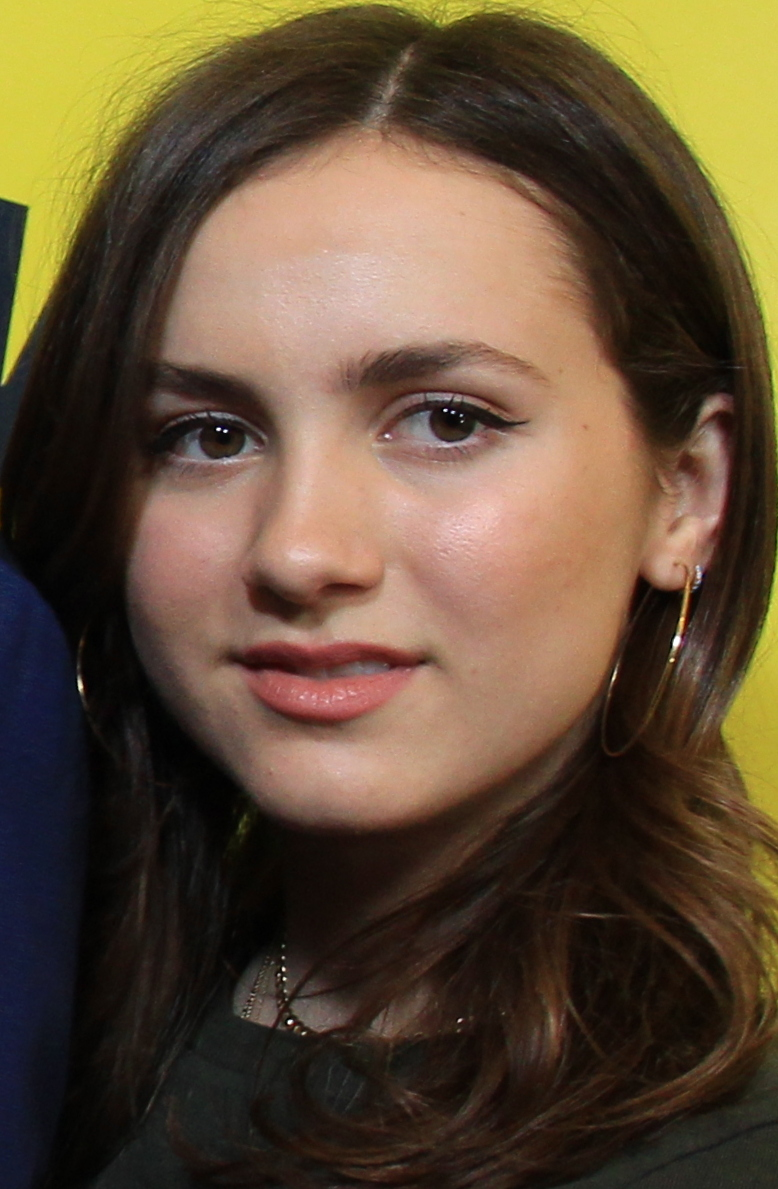
Maude Apatow narrates the episode, the only person other than Zendaya to do so.

The Theatre and Its Double (1938), the collected texts of French poet and playwright Antonin Artaud in which he outlined the Theatre of Cruelty, is the origin of the episode's title. The title is a parallel to Our Life which has a direct double in the real life events being depicted. In an behind-the-scenes video uploaded to Euphoria's YouTube channel, series creator Sam Levinson spoke on Lexi and Fezco's relationship: "You know, what I love about Lexi and Fezco talking is just that there's something that felt kind of innocent and beautiful about that ability to sort of dig deeper into one another. It's genuinely endearing." Lexi's self-insert in Our Life is called "Grace", the same as Apatow's character in Levinson's feature film Assassination Nation (2018).

=== Filming ===
Hungarian director of photography Marcell Rév gave an interview to Variety about the approach to shooting the episode's play: "We really wanted to be in there with Lexi and the characters and experience it from the other side — not from the spectator side, but how it feels to be part of a theater play. We were using theater lighting, and not just for the theater part of it, but for the scenes in reality. We tried to mimic or use that lighting to exaggerate certain moments. It gives you a nice kind of freedom. It justifies a lot of expressionistic lighting situations in real scenes." Ethan Daley (Austin Abrams) plays multiple roles in the play. This includes starring in the homoerotic dance sequence as "Jake" (Nate's equivalent). Abrams spoke at a press junket on the three-day span filming, "it was a lot of work. It took a lot of physical exertion. I was doing that dance a million times over those days. But, I loved the dance, I loved the guys that I was dancing with and it felt very real.”

=== Music ===
"Oops (Oh My)" by American singer Tweet featuring rapper Missy Elliott plays over an onstage cheerleader routine. Ethan's dance sequence is set to "Holding Out for a Hero" written by Welsh singer Bonnie Tyler for the Footloose soundtrack. The main theme to horror film Cannibal Holocaust (1980) made by Italian composer Riz Ortolani plays over the final moments of the episode.

== Reception ==
=== Ratings ===
According to Nielsen Media Research, upon airing "The Theater and Its Double" was watched by 350,000 people. They estimated that 0.14% of the total 18-49 population in the US was tuning in.

=== Critical reviews ===
Review aggregator Rotten Tomatoes gives the episode an approval score of 90%, based on 10 critical reviews. The website's critical consensus reads, "Euphoria slows its breakneck pace for a grand old time at the theater, bringing the house down with an interlude that wryly comments on the series itself." On Metacritic, which uses a weighted average, the episode is assigned 85 out of 100, based on four user ratings. In a ranking of the first two seasons and specials, BuzzFeed listed "The Theater and Its Double" at ten out of eighteen, writing: "This episode was a fever dream, but I loved every second of it." IndieWire placed it at the same number in a list which included season three's premiere "Ándale", writing that the conceit is "easy to roll your eyes at", but that it was "Levinson’s wildest season 2 swing that actually has some heart."

Zosha Millman at Polygon praised "The Theater and Its Double" as a "wild high school play episode [that] immediately deepens the show"; comparing it to the Avatar: The Last Airbender episode "The Ember Island Players", it was explained that "a staged reenactment of events (on stage or otherwise) manages to capture both the narrative wrinkle all while ironing out some of the awkwardness around it." In a four out of five star review, Annabel Nugent of The Independent called the episode "the show’s most anticipated instalment yet". Thrillist praised the frame story as "the most innovative thing the show's ever done", writing that "while Euphoria arguably failed characters like Cassie and Kat this season with degrading arcs or stories that felt unfinished, it thankfully allowed Lexi to get the round of applause she's deserved."

=== Accolades ===
The episode was Euphoria's submission for five of its nominations at the 74th Primetime Creative Arts Emmy Awards. Hair stylists Kimberly Kimble, Kendra Garvey, Patricia Vecchio, and Teresita Mariscal were nominated for the Primetime Emmy Award for Outstanding Hairstyling. Rév won the Primetime Emmy Award for Outstanding Cinematography for a Series (One Hour) for the episode. Make-up artists Tara Lang Shah, Alex French, and Doniella Davy's cosmetics won the Primetime Emmy Award for Outstanding Makeup (Non-Prosthetic). Editors Laura Zempel, Julio C. Perez IV, Nikola Boyanov, and Aaron I. Butler won the Primetime Emmy Award for Outstanding Picture Editing for a Drama Series. Dancer and choreographer Ryan Heffington's work on the cheerleader and football player dance routines, sound tracked to "Oops (Oh My)" and "Holding Out for a Hero", won him the Primetime Emmy Award for Outstanding Choreography. This was also for his "Call Me Irresponsible" choreography in "Ruminations: Big and Little Bullys".

At the 2022 MTV Movie & TV Awards, Tyler was nominated for a MTV Movie Award for Best Musical Moment for the inclusion of "Holding Out for a Hero" in the episode. In 2023, Perez IV, Zempel and their co-editor Boyanov were nominated for the American Cinema Editors Award for Best Edited Drama Series for the episode. Jason Baldwin-Stewart's production design in this episode, the next and "You Who Cannot See, Think of Those Who Can" was honored at the Art Directors Guild Awards 2022 with a nomination for Excellence in Production Design for a One-Hour Contemporary Single-Camera Series.
