= Fuck Anyone Who's Not a Sea Blob =

- Euphoria episode
- Promotional poster
- Directed by: Sam Levinson
- Written by: Hunter Schafer; Sam Levinson
- Cinematography by: Marcell Rév
- Editing by: Julio C. Perez IV
- Original air dates: January 21, 2021 (HBO Max); January 24, 2021 (HBO)
- Running time: 49 minutes

Guest appearances
- John Ales as David Vaughn; Pell James as Amy Vaughn; Lauren Weedman as Dr. Mardy Nichols; Jayden Marcos as "Tyler"

Episode chronology
← Previous "Trouble Don't Last Always"	Next → "Trying to Get to Heaven Before They Close the Door"
- Euphoria specials

"Fuck Anyone Who's Not a Sea Blob" is the second of two specials released between the first two seasons of teen drama television series Euphoria. The episode was written by star Hunter Schafer and series creator Sam Levinson and directed by Levinson. It originally premiered as "Part 2: Jules" on streaming service HBO Max on January 21, 2021, before airing on HBO on January 24.

The special constitutes a bottle episode where main character Jules Vaughn (Schafer), a teenage transgender girl speaks to her therapist Dr. Mardy Nichols (Lauren Weedman) around the Christmas and holiday season. They discuss her gender transition, relationship with her on-and-off girlfriend Rue Bennett (Zendaya) and lingering love for Nate Jacobs (Jacob Elordi), who catfished her under the persona "Tyler".

"Fuck Anyone Who's Not a Sea Blob" was met with universal critical acclaim, particularly for Schafer's acting and writing. Out of the three Primetime Emmy Award nominations received by the show for the specials, two were for this episode, Outstanding Contemporary Costumes and Outstanding Makeup (Non-Prosthetic).

== Plot ==
Jules Vaughn (Hunter Schafer) is grounded and in a psychotherapy session, which Dr. Mardy Nichols (Lauren Weedman) opens by questioning why Jules ran away, although Jules is focused singularly on getting off hormone replacement therapy. Accepting this, Dr. Nichols asks whether this detransition has been well thought-out. Jules refers to constructing an entire identity around what men desire, prompting Dr. Nichols to question whether Jules' personality is truly that "reactive". Pondering it, Jules agrees.

Dr. Nichols prompts further, and Jules laments that women examine each other, check their femininity against the ideal, and categorize them on a hierarchy upon which they treat you accordingly. Dr. Nichols then points out that Rue Bennett (Zendaya) does not do this. The conversation moves back to Jules' desire to get off puberty blockers. Jules used to fear that puberty would make femininity unattainable, but she realized that the ocean is feminine yet "deep" and "thick" like masculinity.

Jules refers to being transgender as spiritual. Jules expresses bitter anger that Rue's sobriety depended singularly on her. In a flashback, Jules' drug addict mother Amy Vaughn (Pell James) overdoses. Dr. Nichols asserts a comparison between Amy and Rue. Jules feels she is still in love with Nate Jacobs's (Jacob Elordi) online persona "ShyGuy118" or "Tyler". Jules considers her sexting with "Tyler" a peerless sexual experience, primarily because it was left up to the imagination.

This facet is something that Jules' attributes to an overdeveloped ability to fall in love easily, bringing the conversation back to Rue. Jules describes her first kiss with Rue, and recalls freezing up in shock at the idea that Rue could love her as much as she loved her. Dr. Nichols questions why Jules would have a mindset that such a thing would be impossible. Jules dreams of her of having sex with "Tyler" in a studio apartment in New York City, imagining a future living together with Rue.

The dream involves Rue slipping deeper into a drug addiction. Jules comes home to find her locked in the bathroom, unresponsive. In a flashback, Jules returns home to find Amy there. Her father David Vaughn (John Ales) tries to defuse the situation when Jules angrily goes upstairs, but the ensuing argument prompts Amy to leave, and shortly after she overdoses once again, which Jules learns of. David is seen bringing Jules home from the city for her therapy session, whereupon Dr. Nichols says that they are out of time. At home, Rue visits the grounded Jules. Although Jules apologizes to Rue, they both start crying and Rue quickly leaves, wishing Jules a merry Christmas. Jules cries in her bedroom.

== Production ==
=== Writing ===
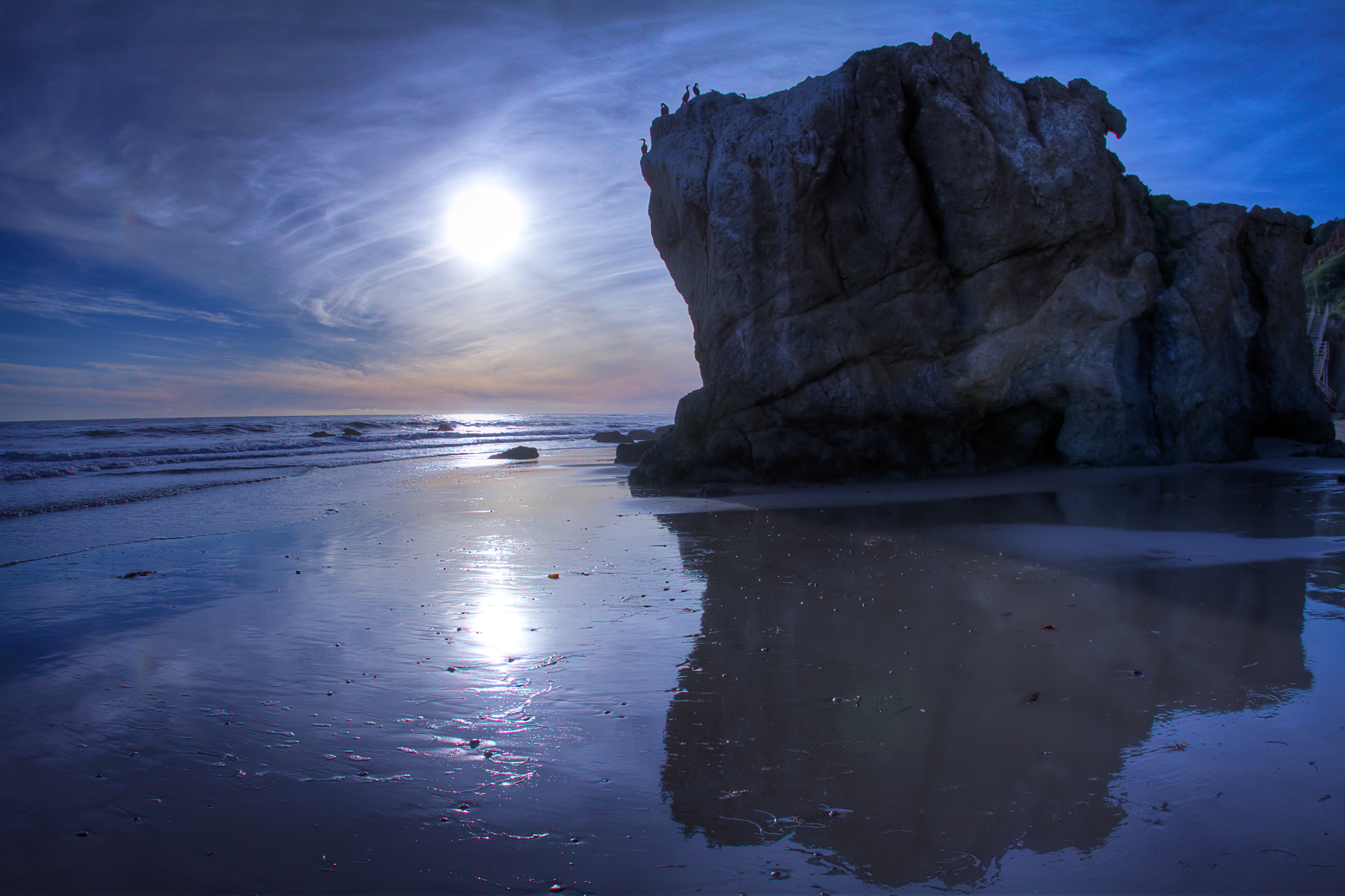
Robert H. Meyer Memorial State Beach was used as a filming location for the special.

HBO announced specials for Euphoria to "bridge the gap" between season 1 and 2 in October 2020. The episode was confirmed to follow Jules' side of the story on December 7, 2020. Schafer, Jules' actress, executive produced the episode and wrote the script alongside showrunner Sam Levinson. She is the only person to write for Euphoria other than Levinson. In a video question and answer on the show's official Twitter account Schafer, said that a Sea Blob is "whatever you want it to be, but in my head when we were coming up with the idea for the title I was thinking about this deep sea creature called the sea angel, which is like this is gelatin blob with wings that kind of just like flaps around in the water, that's what was in my head."

Levinson spoke to GQ on the decision to work with Schafer: "People were debating whether [Jules] was a villain or not. The idea that people could watch the show and walk away feeling that she was a villain was so appalling to me that I thought, 'I’m gonna write an episode that forces the audience to look at the world through her eyes and understand the burden of loving an addict.'" He added that "I’ve been writing a movie with Hunter, which I’m very excited about, so we talk pretty often. And I called her up to get her thoughts on this episode. Several hours later, we were talking and she said something that was based on a poem she had written when she was sixteen about the ocean and its femininity and strength. And I said, “Well, this ought to be actual dialogue. Do you want to just write this thing together?” Four days later, we had a draft of the episode that we co-wrote."

=== Filming ===
The beach scene flashbacks were filmed at Robert H. Meyer Memorial State Beach in Malibu, California. The small cast and lack of locations was a limitation brought about when the filming of season 2 was impacted by the COVID-19 pandemic. Both this episode and the last special "Trouble Don't Last Always" were shot adhering to COVID-19 safety guidelines. In an behind-the-scenes video uploaded to Euphoria's YouTube channel, Schafer and Levinson disclosed that she was "involved in every step of the process." She called the process a "huge learning experience". He said "what's exciting about it is she comes at it from the perspective of an artist, of someone who paints, who draws." Schafer also made storyboards for the special.

=== Music ===
On January 19, 2021, Billie Eilish and Rosalía announced that their new song together "Lo Vas a Olvidar" was set to feature in the soundtrack of this special. "Liability" by Lorde is played in full over an extreme close up shot of Jules' eye, which reflects scenes from season 1. In an interview with Entertainment Weekly, Schafer expressed that the song was her "first true music love" and spoke on its inclusion: "With the platform that the show has given me to be able to make connections with artists who I've admired for so long, and ask for them to contribute. It still blows my mind. [...] Pure Heroine changed my life and Melodrama deeply, deeply just hit for me when it came out." Other licensed songs in the special include "Stabat Mater" by Arvo Pärt and "Love Me Low" by Ai Bendr.

== Reception ==
=== Ratings ===
Viewership and ratings per episode of Fuck Anyone Who's Not a Sea Blob
No.	Title	Air date	Rating/share (18–49)	Viewers (millions)	DVR (18–49)	DVR viewers (millions)	Total (18–49)	Total viewers (millions)
10	"Fuck Anyone Who's Not a Sea Blob"	January 24, 2021	0.02	0.109	0.03	0.045	0.075	0.184

Ahead of its scheduled broadcast on television on January 24, 2021, "Fuck Anyone Who's Not a Sea Blob" was released on HBO Max as "Part 2: Jules" at 9 p.m. on January 21 for the Pacific Time Zone and midnight on January 22 for the Eastern Time Zone.

=== Critical reviews ===
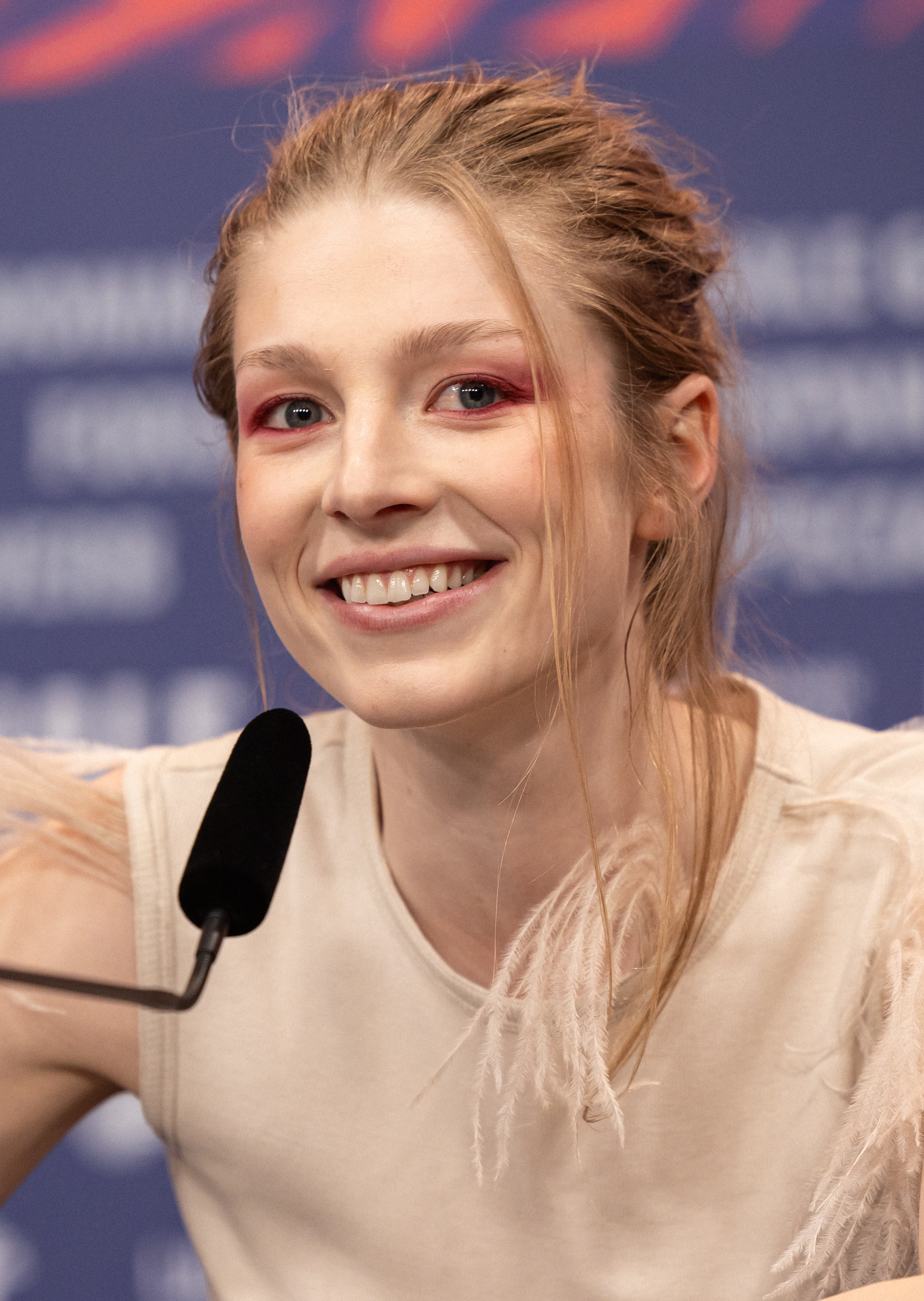
Hunter Schafer co-wrote and starred as Jules Vaughn in "Fuck Anyone Who's Not a Sea Blob".

"Fuck Anyone Who's Not a Sea Blob" received widespread critical acclaim, with particular praise for Schafer's performance and writing, as well as the episode's distinctive directorial approach, emotional resonance, and exploration of trans identity. On Rotten Tomatoes, it has a score of 96%, based on 23 critical reviews. The site's critical consensus reads, "By centering on Jules' journey, "Fuck Anyone Who's Not a Sea Blob" adds welcome depth to her character and gives Hunter Schafer plenty of room to shine." On Metacritic, the episode has an average weighted score of 78 out of 100, based on 10 reviews. TVLine named Schafer their "Performer of the Week" on January 30, 2021 for her work in this episode. The site wrote "Schafer nailed Jules' desire of wanting to be understood, which warred with her despair that no one could possibly know what it was like to be her. On the therapist's couch, Schafer had Jules nervously pluck at the cuffs of her sleeves. Her voice trembled. Every movement communicated how uncomfortable the girl was, yet how deeply she felt the need for someone to bear witness to everything going on in her life." In a ranking of the first two seasons and specials, BuzzFeed listed "Fuck Anyone Who's Not a Sea Blob" at eight out of eighteen, writing: "While it's an exquisite, self-contained pearl of an episode, I think there's a ceiling as to just how good it can be without the strength of the full Euphoria cast to bolster it." IndieWire placed it second, behind the pilot, in a list which included season three's premiere "Ándale", writing that "after season 2’s catastrophic mismanagement of Jules’ character, it feels slightly melancholic to revisit Euphoria season 1 and remember that Hunter Schafer’s free-spirited and avoidant Jules was once the show’s brilliantly effective secondary lead — with a rich inner life and queer demons that Levinson would largely ignore going forward. At least we got one last hurrah with the old Jules in the gorgeous and heartbreaking special episode".

NME praised the episode's thriving under COVID-19 lockdown rules, "The production might be scaled back, but "Fuck Anyone Who's Not a Sea Blob" still packs an emotional punch." In a negative review, Daniel D'Addario of Variety called the special "disappointing". D'Addario added that "Schafer is a natural performer whose point of view on Jules has, through the run of Euphoria, seemed to be guiding the character. (Not for nothing, after all, did she end up a co-writer here.) But she, like Jules, seems lost even within this supposed showcase episode." Ben Travers summed up the episode by writing "Hunter Schafer lays bare Jules' side of things in an emotionally vibrant if narratively slight second hourlong special." RogerEbert.com wrote that the episode "distills some of show’s themes but examines them with the distinct, full voice of Hunter Schafer". The A.V. Club described the special as "eschewing plot for the sake of a close character study."

=== Accolades ===
The episode was Euphoria's submission for two of its nominations at the 73rd Primetime Creative Arts Emmy Awards. Heidi Bivens, Devon Patterson and Angelina Vitto's costuming was nominated for the Primetime Emmy Award for Outstanding Contemporary Costumes. Doniella Davy and Tara Lang Shah's cosmetics were nominated for the Primetime Emmy Award for Outstanding Makeup (Non-Prosthetic).

In 2022, Julio C. Perez IV and his co-editor Nikola Boyanov were nominated for the American Cinema Editors for Best Edited Drama Series for the special. At the 24th Costume Designers Guild Awards the episode was Bivens' nomination for Excellence in Contemporary Television. At the inaugural ceremony of the Hollywood Critics Association TV Awards, the specials were given a Best Broadcast Network or Cable Live-Action Television Movie nomination.

== See also ==
- List of Christmas television specials
- List of United States Christmas television specials
