= Euphoria specials =

Euphoria
- Specials
- Promotional poster
- Showrunner: Sam Levinson
- Starring: Zendaya; Hunter Schafer; Colman Domingo; Jacob Elordi
- No. of episodes: 2

Release
- Original network: HBO
- Original release: December 6, 2020 – January 24, 2021

Season chronology
- ← Previous; Season 1 Next → Season 2

Two television specials of the American psychological teen drama television series Euphoria, inspired by Ron Leshem's miniseries of the same name, premiered on HBO on December 6, 2020 and January 24, 2021. Series creator Sam Levinson serves as showrunner for both specials. Both specials constitute bottle episodes where series protagonist Rue Bennett (Zendaya), an addict teenager speaks to her sponsor, while her transgender girlfriend Jules Vaughn (Hunter Schafer) speaks to a therapist.

In October 2020, HBO ordered two specials to "bridge the gap" between season 1 and season 2, production of which was delayed due to the COVID-19 pandemic. At the 73rd Primetime Creative Arts Emmy Awards the specials were nominated three times.

== Cast and characters ==
=== Main ===
- Zendaya as Rue Bennett
- Hunter Schafer as Jules Vaughn
- Colman Domingo as Ali (né Martin) Muhammad ("Trouble Don't Last Always")
- Jacob Elordi as Nate Jacobs ("Fuck Anyone Who's Not a Sea Blob")

=== Guest ===
- John Ales as David Vaughn ("Fuck Anyone Who's Not a Sea Blob")
- Marsha Gambles as Miss Marsha ("Trouble Don't Last Always")
- Pell James as Amy Vaughn ("Fuck Anyone Who's Not a Sea Blob")
- Jayden Marcos as "Tyler" ("Fuck Anyone Who's Not a Sea Blob")
- Lauren Weedman as Dr. Mardy Nichols ("Fuck Anyone Who's Not a Sea Blob")

== Episodes ==
No. overall	No. in specials	Title	Directed by	Written by	Original release date	U.S. viewers (millions)
9	1	"Trouble Don't Last Always"	Sam Levinson	Sam Levinson	December 6, 2020	0.236
After her relapse, an intoxicated Rue Bennett meets Ali Muhammad at a diner on Christmas Eve, and they talk about their addictions. Rue admits that she willingly relapsed; Ali reminds her that addiction is a disease and emphasizes the importance of committing to a cause greater than herself. Rue attempts to blame her girlfriend Jules Vaughn for her relapse, but Ali points out that Rue had been saving the pills she took, suggesting that she was never serious about staying sober. He also notes that Rue never officially acknowledged her relationship with Jules. Rue eventually admits that she feels guilty about her treatment of her family, particularly her mother, and that she is suicidal. Ali argues that drugs fundamentally change a person; he reveals that his birth name is Martin and he grew up with an abusive father for whom he harbored deep hatred, only to become violent with his wife after developing a drug addiction, estranging his daughters. Ali tells Rue that a refusal to forgive oneself for one's mistakes is what prevents personal growth, and that he has faith in her ability to improve.
10	2	"Fuck Anyone Who's Not a Sea Blob"	Sam Levinson	Sam Levinson & Hunter Schafer	January 24, 2021	0.109
Over Christmas, after leaving Rue behind at the train station, Jules attends her first psychotherapy session. She says Rue is the only person she believes loved her for who she truly is, but admits resenting the burden of having to preserve Rue's sobriety by being constantly available to her. Flashbacks reveal that Jules' mother was recovering from addiction during the events of the first season, but was hospitalized as the result of a relapse after overhearing Jules admit she cannot forgive her for abandoning her as a child. Jules's therapist observes that Jules's complicated feelings about Rue closely resemble those she has about her own mother. Jules further confides that she is still in love with "Tyler", the fake online persona Nate Jacobs used to communicate with her, despite knowing that their relationship is a fantasy. Jules tells her therapist that she is contemplating going off her hormones, specifically her puberty blockers due to her evolving notion of her own femininity, which she believes she has expressed only to please men. Upon returning home, Jules receives a surprise visit from Rue, who says she is on her way to meet Ali. Jules tries to apologize to Rue for leaving her, but an emotional Rue simply wishes Jules a merry Christmas before abruptly leaving. Jules breaks down crying in her bedroom.

== Production ==
=== Development ===
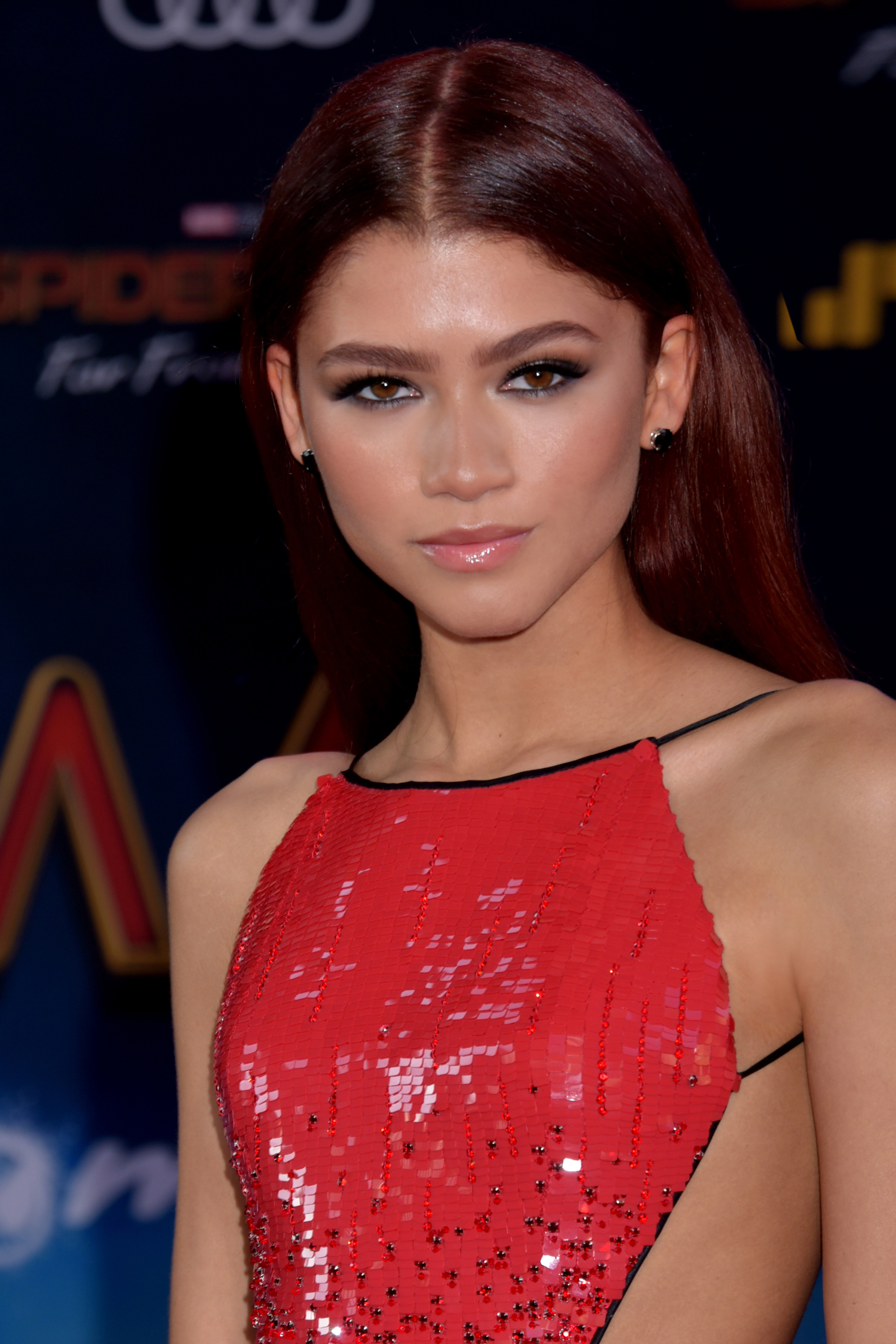
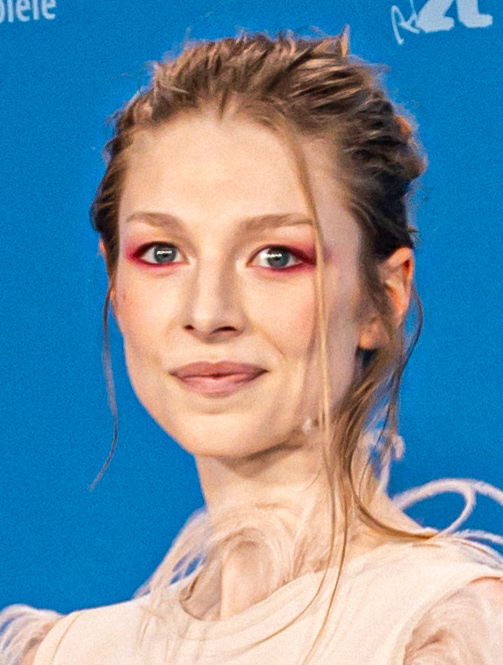
Zendaya and Hunter Schafer star as girlfriends Rue Bennett and Jules Vaughn.

Sam Levinson's adaptation of the Israeli television series Euphoria created by Ron Leshem had two special episodes ordered on October 19, 2020 to "bridge the gap" between season 1 and season 2. Production for Euphoria's second season had been delayed by the COVID-19 pandemic. The first special, called "Trouble Don't Last Always" features Zendaya's character Rue Bennett speaking to Colman Domingo's Ali Muhammed. The second special, "Fuck Anyone Who's Not a Sea Blob" features Hunter Schafer's character Jules Vaughn speaking to her therapist. Levinson directed both episodes. He wrote part one himself and brought on Schafer as a co-writer for part two.

=== Casting ===
All members of the cast were reprising their role from season 1 of Euphoria, bar two: Lauren Weedman and Jayden Marcos, who play new character Dr. Mardy Nichols, Jules' therapist, and Jules' vision of "Tyler", the online persona of Nate Jacobs, who also appears in her imagination portrayed by Jacob Elordi, credited as a main cast member. Weedman said she was proud of her work in the specials: "No-brainer. I liked Euphoria a lot, because the experience mattered to me. I got to sit and listen to Hunter — she helped write that episode, and it was incredibly personal. I truly felt like I was witnessing the evolution of humanity by listening to her talk about being trans. It was deep. I loved it. But it was only one or two days of shooting." Marcos is a pornographic film actor.

=== Filming ===
Principal photography for the specials took place across a couple of weeks in late 2020, adhering to COVID-19 safety guidelines. Series cinematographer Marcell Rév shot both specials entirety on 35 mm movie film, specifically Kodak's Ektachrome. He spoke to Arri, who provided the digital camera's for season 1, on the filming both specials: "So these two Euphoria specials were written and designed for these COVID times. So it was always in the plan to do it safely. That made it of course easier to shoot it, but at the same time what we could learn from this pandemic is that we get a better idea of what's really necessary."

== Release ==
The specials were promoted with the tagline "This is not Season 2". Ahead of their scheduled broadcasts on HBO, "Trouble Don't Last Always" and "Fuck Anyone Who's Not a Sea Blob" were released three days early on streaming service HBO Max. Labeled as "Part 1: Rue", the first special premiered on December 3, 2020 at 9 p.m (Pacific Time Zone) or December 4 at midnight (Eastern Time Zone). Labeled as "Part 2: Jules", the second special premiered on January 21, 2021 at 9 p.m (PT) or January 22 at midnight (ET). In the United Kingdom and the Republic of Ireland, each special was released through Sky Atlantic's streaming service Now. The specials were included in a DVD collection with the seasons either side of them in November 2022.

== Reception ==
=== Critical response ===
Professional ratings
Aggregate scores
Source	Rating
Rotten Tomatoes	97% ("Part 1: Rue"); 96% ("Part 2: Jules")
Metacritic	84/100 ("Part 1: Rue"); 78/100 ("Part 2: Jules")
Review scores
Source	Rating
Digital Spy	A ("Part 1: Rue"); A ("Part 2: Jules")

The specials received widespread critical acclaim for their writing, performances, and shift in tone and content from the first season. On Rotten Tomatoes, they have scores of 97% and 96%, based on 30 and 23 critical reviews respectively. The website's critical consensus for the first special reads, "Euphoria slows down the tempo without losing the beat in a special episode that pairs a raw Zendaya with a steady Colman Domingo to create small screen magic." For the second special it reads: "By centering on Jules' journey, "Fuck Anyone Who's Not a Sea Blob" adds welcome depth to her character and gives Hunter Schafer plenty of room to shine." On Metacritic, the specials has an average weighted score of 84 and 78 out of 100 respectively, both based on 10 reviews, which it describes as "Universal Acclaim" for the first special and "Generally Favorable" for the second. Ani Bundel of NBC News wrote that "Both specials focus on the fundamentals — startlingly realistic writing and mesmerizing performances by Zendaya (in part one) and Hunter Schafer (in part two)." Kelly Martinez wrote that the show should continue with the format of specials.

=== Accolades ===
The Academy of Television Arts & Sciences acknowledged the specials at their Primetime Emmy Award ceremonies three times. At the 73rd Primetime Emmy Awards the specials were nominated for Outstanding Cinematography for a Series (One Hour) (Rév for "Trouble Don't Last Always"), Outstanding Contemporary Costumes (Heidi Bivens, Devon Patterson, and Angelina Vitto for "Fuck Anyone Who's Not a Sea Blob"), and Outstanding Makeup (Non-Prosthetic) (Doniella Davy and Tara Lang Shah for "Fuck Anyone Who's Not a Sea Blob").

Zendaya gained a Satellite Award for Best Actress – Television Film nomination for her work in the specials. In addition to her performance in Levinson's 2021 Netflix film Malcolm & Marie, Zendaya was nominated for the Black Entertainment Television Award for Best Actress in 2021. In 2021 and 2022 Julio C. Perez IV was given a nomination for Best Edited Drama Series for his work in the both specials.At the inaugural ceremony of the Hollywood Critics Association TV Awards, Domingo won Best Actor in a Television Movie, Zendaya was nominated for Best Actress in a Television Movie and the specials were given a Best Broadcast Network or Cable Live-Action Television Movie nomination.

The first special was nominated for a Peabody Award in the entertainment category. At the 73rd Writers Guild of America Awards, Levinson's screenplay for "Trouble Don't Last Always" was nominated for the Writers Guild of America Award for Television: Episodic Drama. For his role in the first special, Domingo won Best Supporting Actor – Television (Drama) at the 2021 Imagen Awards. In 2021, the Costume Designers Guild Awards nominated Heidi Bivens for Excellence in Contemporary Television. for the first episode. Melanie Smith and Kaity Licina were nominated for a Make-Up Artists & Hair Stylists Guild Award for Best Contemporary Hair Styling in a Television Special, One-Hour or More Live Program Series or Movie for Television in 2020 for "Trouble Don't Last Always". At the 24th Costume Designers Guild Awards "Fuck Anyone Who's Not a Sea Blob" was Bivens' nomination for Excellence in Contemporary Television.
