= Stand Still Like the Hummingbird =

- Euphoria episode
- Morphine for Rue Bennett.
- Episode no.: Season 2 Episode 5
- Directed by: Sam Levinson
- Written by: Sam Levinson
- Cinematography by: Marcell Rév
- Editing by: Aaron I. Butler
- Original air date: February 6, 2022
- Running time: 54 minutes

Guest appearances
- Alanna Ubach as Suze Howard; Martha Kelly as Laurie; Richie Merritt as Bruce Jr.; Bruce Wexler as Robert Bennett

Episode chronology
← Previous "You Who Cannot See, Think of Those Who Can"	Next → "A Thousand Little Trees of Blood"
- Euphoria season 2

"Stand Still Like the Hummingbird" is the fifth episode of the second season of the American teen drama television series Euphoria. The episode was written and directed by series creator Sam Levinson. It originally aired on HBO on February 6, 2022. The title of this episode is a reference to the 1962 essay collection of the same name by American novelist Henry Miller.

The episode's cold open depicts addict teenager Rue Bennett (Zendaya) as the truth of her relapse is revealed to her family. In the episode proper, she runs away from her intervention and attempts to pay off drug dealer Laurie (Martha Kelly) as she suffers from withdrawal.

"Stand Still Like the Hummingbird" received universal critical acclaim, particularly for Zendaya and Kelly's performances and Levinson's direction. At the Directors Guild of America Awards Levinson won Outstanding Directorial Achievement in Dramatic Series for the episode. Out of the sixteen Primetime Emmy Award nominations received by the show for its second season, three were specifically for this episode, Outstanding Sound Mixing for a Comedy or Drama Series (One-Hour), Outstanding Guest Actress in a Drama Series for Kelly and Outstanding Lead Actress in a Drama Series for Zendaya, which she won.

== Plot ==
Gia Bennett (Storm Reid) overhears an argument between her mother Leslie (Nika King), who has recently discovered that her eldest daughter Rue (Zendaya) has relapsed to hard drugs again. Rue begins to panic, as she can't find the suitcase that dealer Laurie (Martha Kelly) fronted her. After Rue has a violent meltdown, Leslie reveals that Jules Vaughn (Hunter Schafer) was the one who told her. Rue becomes incensed at hearing Jules' voice, finding her and Elliot (Dominic Fike) in the living room. Rue, realizing the affair between Jules and Elliot, harshly berates Jules and ends their relationship. Rue allows Leslie to drive her to the hospital, but upon realizing she intends to send her back to drug rehabilitation, gets out in the middle of the road and runs away.

Rue runs to Lexi (Maude Apatow) and Cassie Howard's (Sydney Sweeney) house. She steals jewelry from the bathroom in an effort to pay Laurie back. Rue returns to find Leslie, Maddy Perez (Alexa Demie), Kat Hernandez (Barbie Ferreira) and the others gathered for an impromptu intervention. To divert everyone's attention, Rue reveals to everyone that Cassie had been having sex with Nate Jacobs (Jacob Elordi). An enraged Maddy chases Cassie up the stairs and Rue slips out amidst the chaos.

Rue goes to Fezco O'Neill (Angus Cloud) and begs him for drugs to ease her drug withdrawals. Rue sneaks into Fezco's grandma's room to steal her pills. Fezco catches her and throws her out of his house. Rue stumbles into a wealthy neighborhood and sneaks into a couple's home, raiding it for jewelry and cash. The couple returns home and the wife notices missing jewelry, who alerts her husband to call the police and get the gun. Immediately after, the husband finds Rue, who runs out of the house.

As her withdrawals continue to worsen, Rue encounters police officers who ask her where she's going. While trying to answer them, she vomits and runs away. The police begin to chase her and Rue runs several blocks and across a busy street to escape, causing a traffic collision in the process. Rue arrives at Laurie's apartment with $2,000 in cash and the jewelry. Laurie rejects Rue's money, but seems merciful and forgiving. Laurie tells Rue that she was introduced to opiates after a shoulder surgery, empathizing with Rue's withdrawal.

A now-barely conscious Rue notices a padlocked door at the end of the hall, with scratching noises coming from the other side. Laurie suggests Rue turn to prostitution to pay her debts. Laurie puts her in the bathtub and injects her with morphine, causing Rue to pass out. Rue then dreams about a series of memories involving her father, including the birth of her sister and the eulogy she gave for his funeral. In the morning, Rue wakes up and finds Laurie's front door locked. Rue carefully sneaks across the apartment, eventually jumping out a second-story window and escaping. She returns home, where her mother is anxiously waiting.

== Production ==
=== Writing ===
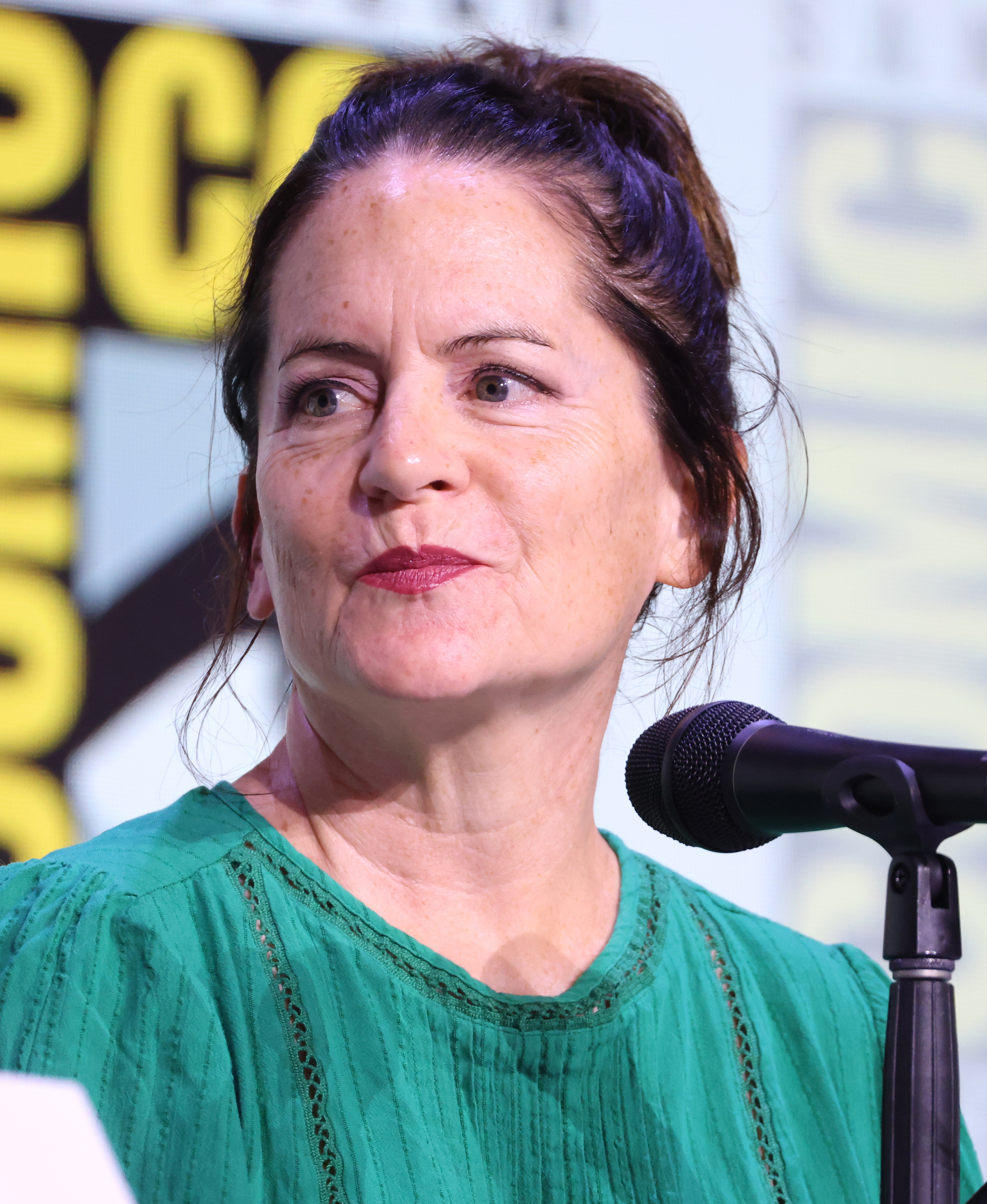
Martha Kelly was nominated for a Primetime Emmy Award for the episode.

American novelist Henry Miller's 1962 collection of philosophy, stories and essays, Stand Still Like the Hummingbird, is the origin of the episode's title. This name was chosen to parallel Rue's desperation, to quote Miller, "when you are convinced that all the exits are blocked, either you take to believing in miracles or you stand still like the hummingbird." In an behind-the-scenes video uploaded to Euphoria's YouTube channel, series creator and writer Sam Levinson spoke on the writing process: "There's obviously parallels I have in my own life to Rue, so it wasn't hard to imagine how that situation would unfold." He also articulated that "It's ultimately, I think, something we forget about addiction is the impact it has on families. As a parent, I can't imagine being on the other end of something like that."

=== Filming ===
Zendaya called the filming of the episode a "war zone" in an interview with Teen Vogue, "I'm very grateful that I'm in a space where I feel comfortable and safe, and with actors and actresses that I'm obviously very close with. After every take, we're hugging each other, we're talking through it, we're embracing, checking in." She also made a post on her Instagram about Rue hitting "rock bottom", shared before the episode's broadcast: "I also care about the people who care about her, because I think many of them share her story of addiction and sobriety, and many of them share a lot of emotional disorders, and I think it's important that we continue to have that love for her."

=== Music ===
A cover of "What a Fool Believes" by The Doobie Brothers plays in Laurie's apartment and the song "It Never Rains in Southern California" by Albert Hammond and Mike Hazlewood plays over the closing credits.

== Reception ==
=== Ratings ===
According to Nielsen Media Research, upon airing "Stand Still Like the Hummingbird" was watched by 353,000 people. They estimated that 0.11% of the total 18-49 population in the US was tuning in.

=== Critical reviews ===
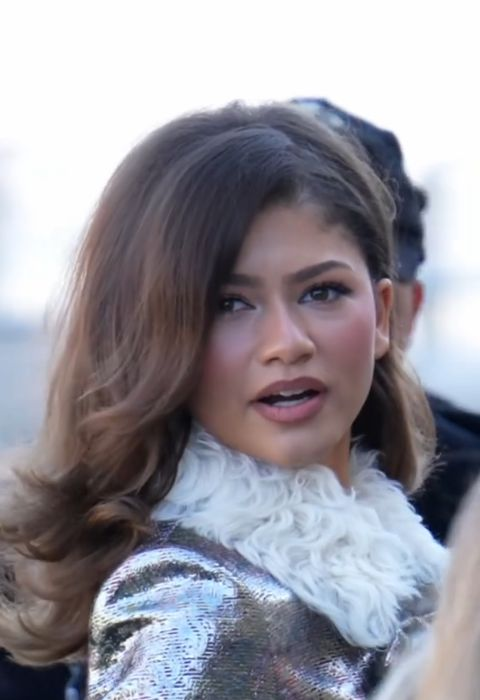
"Stand Still Like the Hummingbird" won Zendaya a Primetime Emmy Award.

Review aggregator website Rotten Tomatoes gives the episode an approval score of 88%, based on 8 critical reviews. TVLine named Zendaya their "Performer of the Week" on February 12, 2022 for her work in this episode. The site wrote "The whole episode was a tour de force for Zendaya, but we'd like to focus on the episode's cold open. She packed more depth of feeling into those 18 minutes than some actresses do in an entire feature film, as Rue tried every tack possible to get her mother to tell her where the confiscated drugs had gone." In a ranking of the first two seasons and specials, BuzzFeed listed "Stand Still Like the Hummingbird" at three out of eighteen, writing: "Zendaya acts her ass off front to back as she begins the episode with a blistering fight with her mother before spiraling into a prolonged chase sequence and eventually falling into the clutches of a potentially evil drug dealer." IndieWire placed it at seventh in a list which included season three's premiere "Ándale", writing that the episode "rests almost entirely on the actor’s ability to portray Rue hitting rock bottom in a believable, sympathetic way, it kicks off with the best scene in all of season 2".

In a four out of five star review, The Independent described "Stand Still Like the Hummingbird" as "a heartbreaking, standout episode that all but guarantees Zendaya another Emmy", writing: "Euphoria needed an episode like this. For one thing, creator Sam Levinson finally slows his roll. The camera – which typically glides, swoops, and whip pans – takes a breath." Journalist for the piece Annabel Nugent also praised Reid's performance as "entirely convincing". Fletcher Peters of Decider lauded the episode's cold open as "one of the best opening scenes in Euphoria history." Jezebel commented that "Zendaya is an absolute tour de force" in the episode, saying "she becomes entirely unrecognizable." A writer at Refinery29 said the episode made them stop watching the series, writing that "["Stand Still Like the Hummingbird"] leans into this sense of fear wrapped in a prestige TV bow to an almost unnecessary degree, ultimately equating trauma with importance."

=== Accolades ===
The episode was Zendaya's submission at the 74th Primetime Emmy Awards, leading her to win the Primetime Emmy Award for Outstanding Lead Actress in a Drama Series. This was her second Primetime Emmy Award, making her the youngest two time winner. Two of Euphoria's nominations at the 74th Primetime Creative Arts Emmy Awards were for the episode. Kelly's role in the episode was nominated for the Primetime Emmy Award for Outstanding Guest Actress in a Drama Series. Audio engineers Anne Jimkes-Root, Chris David, Austin Roth, and Sean O'Malley were nominated for Primetime Emmy Award for Outstanding Sound Mixing for a Comedy or Drama Series (One-Hour).

At the 75th Directors Guild of America Awards, Levinson won the Directors Guild of America Award for Outstanding Directorial Achievement in Dramatic Series for his work in the episode. At the 2nd Hollywood Critics Association TV Awards, Levinson was honored twice with nominations for Best Directing and Best Writing, both in the Broadcast Network or Cable Series, Drama category. In 2023, Aaron I. Butler and his supervising-editor Julio C. Perez IV were nominated for the American Cinema Editors Award for Best Edited Drama Series for the episode. Sound editors Anne Jimkes, Austin Roth, Beso Kacharava, Bryant J. Fuhrmann, and Wylie Stateman were also gained a nomination for the HPA Award for Outstanding Sound – Television for their work in the episode.
