= Trouble Don't Last Always =

- Euphoria episode
- Promotional poster
- Directed by: Sam Levinson
- Written by: Sam Levinson
- Cinematography by: Marcell Rév
- Editing by: Julio C. Perez IV
- Original air dates: December 3, 2020 (HBO Max); December 6, 2020 (HBO)
- Running time: 57 minutes

Guest appearance
- Marsha Gambles as Miss Marsha

Episode chronology
← Previous "And Salt the Earth Behind You"	Next → "Fuck Anyone Who's Not a Sea Blob"
- Euphoria specials

"Trouble Don't Last Always" is the first of two specials released between the first two seasons of teen drama television series Euphoria. The episode was written and directed by series creator Sam Levinson. It originally premiered as "Part 1: Rue" on streaming service HBO Max on December 3, 2020, before airing on HBO on December 6.

The special constitutes a bottle episode where series protagonist Rue Bennett (Zendaya), a teenage drug addict, speaks to her sponsor, an older Muslim man named Ali Muhammad (Colman Domingo) on Christmas Eve. They discuss her recent relapse and relationship with her on-and-off girlfriend Jules Vaughn (Hunter Schafer).

"Trouble Don't Last Always" was met with universal critical acclaim, particularly for Zendaya and Domingo's acting, Levinson's writing and Marcell Rév's cinematography. The episode was nominated for the Writers Guild of America Award for Television: Episodic Drama, Primetime Emmy Award for Outstanding Cinematography for a Series (One Hour) and at the Peabody Awards.

== Plot ==
Rue Bennett (Zendaya) imagines a future for herself and Jules Vaughn (Hunter Schafer), living together in a studio apartment in New York City. On Christmas Eve, Rue returns from the diner bathroom to speak to her sponsor Ali Muhamand (Colman Domingo). Rue declares she is a functioning addict. Ali keeps bringing up why Rue relapsed, and she confesses that she had a saved stash of drugs; Ali appreciates her honesty.

Ali and Rue debate whether she is a "piece of shit"; he counters that addiction is a disease. Ali admits to being sober for twelve years and seven prior to a year and a half long relapse. Ali states that before his reversion to Islam his birth name was Martin, surprising Rue. Rue visibly becomes angered by his belief in God. Ali dismisses her lists of higher powers: Mack Trucks, the ocean and Otis Redding songs.

After Ali reminds Rue that she is only alive because of God, she questions why He let her father die and attempts to convince Ali people only live or die due to luck. Ali recounts the life of Malcolm X, pulling no punches discussing race and the war on drugs. He scoffs at the coopting of revolutions by slacktivists and corporations like Nike, who are only placating to black people for profit. Ali briefly exits to the parking lot to smoke a cigarette; he calls his eldest daughter Imani and speaks to his grandson Rashad on the phone.

Jules sends Rue a song in a text saying she misses her; Rue listens to it while waiting for Ali. When Ali returns to the diner, Rue requests help with Jules. Ali turns to the advice of waitress Miss Marsha, who has been sober for seventeen years. Marsha states she had to prioritize her sobriety over dating because she could not do both simultaneously. Rue is furious regarding Jules' infidelity while she was sober, but concedes to her that they never officially declared they were dating.

Rue confesses to Ali that she once threatened her mother with a glass shard, and believes that the act is unforgivable. Ali counters that it is not, compared to what he has done; he confesses that he used to hit the mother of his children, like his father did to his mother. Ali warns her that compromising her beliefs for drug use will degrade her moral fiber over time. Rue tearfully discloses that she is suicidal and does not plan to survive much longer. Ali wistfully speaks about the world's bleak nature. She adds she doesn't wish to be a part of it. Ali expresses his faith in her. They leave the diner in his truck through the rain.

== Production ==
=== Writing ===
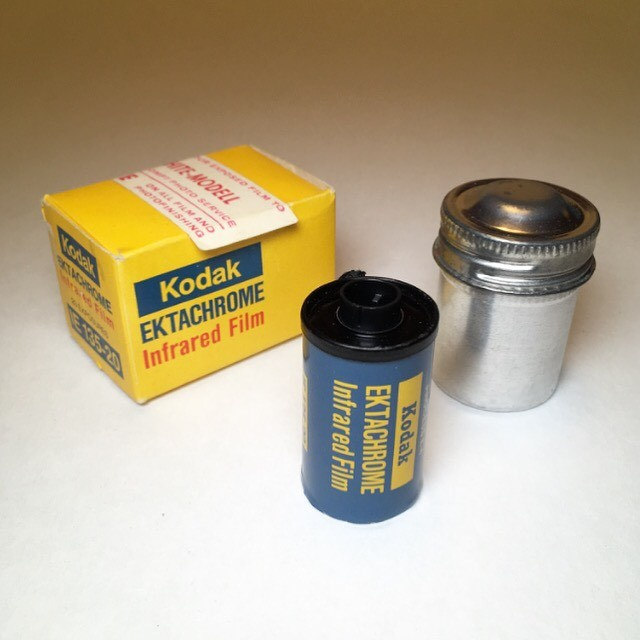
The special was the first Euphoria episode shot entirety on 35 mm movie film, specifically Kodak's Ektachrome.

HBO announced specials for Euphoria to "bridge the gap" between season 1 and 2 in October, 2020. The title of this episode is a line from Marsha. A phrase related to the Bible, it is Marsha's response to Ali asking if she could date while trying to get sober. Series creator and writer Sam Levinson spoke to GQ on the decision to set the episode at Christmas: "Despite being a Jew, it’s my favourite holiday. Plus, I’ve spent quite a few Christmases in inpatient hospitals, watching snow fall through barred windows, so I have a strange, reflective, maybe rueful connection to it."

In an behind-the-scenes video uploaded to Euphoria's YouTube channel, Domingo said the episode was "a Christmas gift to 2020. You've been wrestling with these things out in the world, well, we're gonna give you some tools to work it out, and we're gonna wrap it all in a bow, but it's gonna be messy when you unravel it."

=== Filming ===
Frank's Coffee Shop in Burbank, California was used as the diner for the location shooting in the episode. The small cast and lack of locations was a limitation brought about when the filming of season 2 was impacted by the COVID-19 pandemic. Both this episode and the next special "Fuck Anyone Who's Not a Sea Blob" were shot adhering to COVID-19 safety guidelines. Zendaya spoke about guest star Marsha Gambles on and appearance on Jimmy Kimmel Live!, "We're so lucky that we have her in the Euphoria family, but we actually met her at one of the churches that we shot Euphoria season 1 at." She added that "We were just taken by her charm and personality and her story. She has her own story of addiction and her own battle with addiction, and she was so open and honest and Sam was like, 'Miss Marsha, we're coming back for you."

=== Music ===
Moses Sumney's song "Me in 20 Years" from his studio album Græ was featured in the special as the song Jules sends Rue on Spotify. Lydia Wang of Refinery29 noted the track encapsulated Rue's fear in wondering how her future would be like and whether she was destined to be alone. Sumney went on the appear in Levinson's other HBO show The Idol.

== Reception ==
=== Ratings ===
Viewership and ratings per episode of Trouble Don't Last Always
No.	Title	Air date	Rating/share (18–49)	Viewers (millions)	DVR (18–49)	DVR viewers (millions)	Total (18–49)	Total viewers (millions)
9	"Trouble Don't Last Always"	December 6, 2020	0.08	0.236	0.09	0.085	0.175	0.321

Ahead of its scheduled broadcast on television on December 6, 2020, "Trouble Don't Last Always" was released on HBO Max as "Part 1: Rue" at 9 p.m. on December 3 for the Pacific Time Zone and midnight on December 4 for the Eastern Time Zone.

=== Critical reviews ===
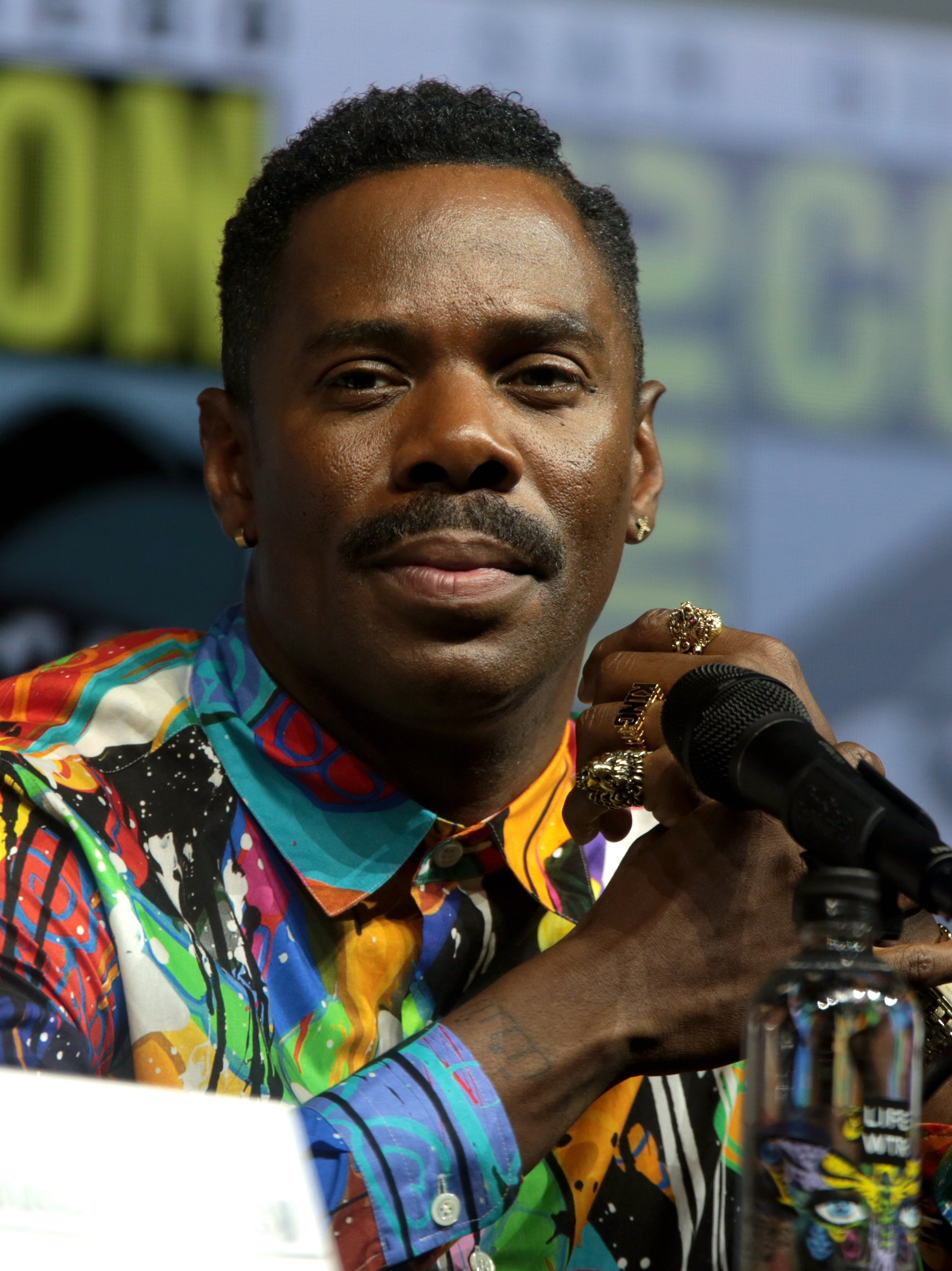
Colman Domingo was upgraded to the main cast in "Trouble Don't Last Always". His performance was praised by critics.

"Trouble Don't Last Always" received widespread critical acclaim for its writing, performances, and shift in tone and content from the first season. On Rotten Tomatoes, the episode has a score of 97%, based on 30 critical reviews. The website's critical consensus reads, "Euphoria slows down the tempo without losing the beat in a special episode that pairs a raw Zendaya with a steady Colman Domingo to create small screen magic." On Metacritic, the episode has a weighted average score of 84 out of 100, based on 10 reviews. TVLine named Domingo their "Performer of the Week" on December 12, 2020 for his work in this episode. The site wrote "Throughout, Domingo was perfection. We were blown away by the way he handled discussion of the terrible things Ali had done while under the power of his addiction, the way the actor allowed the character's self-assuredness to fall away for a moment, revealing true shame and regret. And we marveled at the way Domingo — without drawing one iota of attention away from Zendaya's equally marvelous performance — served as a stand-in for the audience as Ali reacted to Rue's matter-of-fact declaration that she didn't expect to live much longer." In a ranking of the first two seasons and specials, BuzzFeed listed "Trouble Don't Last Always" at seven out of eighteen, writing: "As with Jules's episode, there is no denying how gut-wrenching and perfect these moments and performances are. Zendaya and Colman Domingo are giving award-worthy monologues here, and despite the whole episode being a single conversation in a diner booth, I was captivated the whole time." IndieWire placed it in fifth in a list which included season three's premiere "Ándale", writing that "Domingo was able to fully realize his character’s potential as an unwavering and even intimidating force for good in Rue’s life."

Rebecca Nicholson of The Guardian praised the special, "for the most part, I was lost in its world and captivated by the back-and-forth, which is frequently as funny as it is grim." In a review fro Variety, Caroline Framke said that "Maybe a simple two-hander wouldn’t have been in the cards if the show hadn’t been forced to slow itself down — but it just might be the deep, resetting breath that both Rue and “Euphoria” need to move forward." The A.V. Club wrote that "Euphoria shines brightest in its stripped-down special episode" writing that the "success of the episode really does hinge on a smart and engaging script and on Domingo and Zendaya bringing it to life with as much fervor as the flashier episodes of Euphoria evoke." NME described the special as a "compelling exploration of addiction".

=== Accolades ===
In 2021, "Trouble Don't Last Always" was nominated for a Peabody Award in the entertainment category. The special episode was Euphoria's main cinematographer Marcell Rév's submission at the 73rd Primetime Creative Arts Emmy Awards, leading him to a nomination for the Primetime Emmy Award for Outstanding Cinematography for a Series (One Hour). At the 73rd Writers Guild of America Awards, Levinson's screenplay was nominated for the Writers Guild of America Award for Television: Episodic Drama.

Zendaya gained a Satellite Award for Best Actress – Television Film nomination for her role as Rue in the special. In addition to her performance in Levinson's 2021 Netflix film Malcolm & Marie, Zendaya was nominated for the Black Entertainment Television Award for Best Actress in 2021. At the inaugural ceremony of the Hollywood Critics Association TV Awards, Domingo won Best Actor in a Television Movie, Zendaya was nominated for Best Actress in a Television Movie and the specials overall were given a Best Broadcast Network or Cable Live-Action Television Movie nomination. For his role in the special, Domingo won Best Supporting Actor – Television (Drama) at the 2021 Imagen Awards.

The American Cinema Editors Awards 2021 gave Julio C. Perez IV a nomination for Best Edited Drama Series for his work in the special. In 2021, the Costume Designers Guild Awards nominated Heidi Bivens for Excellence in Contemporary Television. for the episode. Melanie Smith and Kaity Licina were nominated for a Make-Up Artists & Hair Stylists Guild Award for Best Contemporary Hair Styling in a Television Special, One-Hour or More Live Program Series or Movie for Television in 2020 for "Trouble Don't Last Always".

== See also ==
- List of Christmas television specials
- List of United States Christmas television specials
