= And Salt the Earth Behind You =

- Euphoria episode
- A choir holds up Rue Bennett.
- Episode no.: Season 1 Episode 8
- Directed by: Sam Levinson
- Written by: Sam Levinson
- Cinematography by: Adam Newport-Berra
- Editing by: Julio C. Perez IV
- Original air date: August 4, 2019
- Running time: 64 minutes

Guest appearances
- Alanna Ubach as Suze Howard; Austin Abrams as Ethan Daley; Elpidia Carrillo as Sonia Perez; Paula Marshall as Marsha Jacobs; Tyler Chase as Custer; John Ales as David Vaughn; Mercedes Colon as Kat's Mom; Allie Marie Evans as Natalie

Episode chronology
← Previous "The Trials and Tribulations of Trying to Pee While Depressed"	Next → "Trouble Don't Last Always"
- Euphoria season 1

"And Salt the Earth Behind You" is the eighth and final episode of the first season of the American teen drama television series Euphoria. The episode was written and directed by series creator Sam Levinson. It originally aired on HBO on August 4, 2019.

The episode is Euphoria's first without a cold open introducing a character's childhood. The finale portrays the school's winter formal, where Rue Bennett (Zendaya) attempts to repair her relationship with Jules Vaughn (Hunter Schafer) and confront Nate Jacobs (Jacob Elordi), who has tormented Jules since she moved to the suburbs. Meanwhile, Cassie Howard (Sydney Sweeney) gets an abortion.

"And Salt the Earth Behind You" received critical acclaim, particularly for the ending musical sequence of "All for Us" by Labrinth, which was interpreted and analyzed heavily among critics. Out of the six Primetime Emmy Award nominations received by the show for its first season, half were specifically for this episode, resulting in two wins, Outstanding Original Music and Lyrics and Outstanding Makeup for a Single-Camera Series (Non-Prosthetic).

== Plot ==
Rue Bennett (Zendaya) revels in the lack of responsibilities she has while recovering in hospital from a urinary tract infection. Her girlfriend Jules Vaughn (Hunter Schafer) returns from the city to visit Rue, and they fantasize about immolating and shooting Nate Jacobs (Jacob Elordi).

In a flashback to summer, Rue's mother Leslie (Nika King) speaks at group therapy about how her daughter's addiction has affected her family. In the present, East Highland High School throws a winter formal. Nate and Maddy Perez (Alexa Demie) appear to be angry with each other again, and they dance with other people to spite each other. Flashbacks to a few nights before depict Nate experiencing erectile dysfunction with Maddy; he attacks her when she confronts him about his sexual orientation. Maddy then steals a sex tape of Nate's father Cal (Eric Dane) and Jules that Nate has in his possession, and is later seen watching it in shock.

At the formal, Kat Hernandez (Barbie Ferreira) seeks out Ethan Daley (Austin Abrams) to apologize for her poor behavior and admits that she loves him; Ethan admits that he also has feelings for Kat, and they both decide to leave the formal. While watching Kat and Ethan reconcile, Cassie Howard (Sydney Sweeney) and her sister Lexi (Maude Apatow) discuss the prospect of relationships, and flashbacks reveal Cassie getting an abortion with the support of Lexi and their mother Suze (Alanna Ubach). During the operation, Cassie envisions herself ice skating, an activity that she used to practice as a child. Elsewhere, Fezco O'Neill (Angus Cloud) commits armed robbery against a high-ranking official to pay his drug supplier Mouse.

Flashbacks depict Nate winning his final high school football game. When Cal criticizes his performance, Nate has an intense argument with Cal and attempts to fight him. After being subdued, Nate breaks down in tears and violently slams his head against the floor, leaving Cal shaken. In the present, Rue confronts Nate for threatening Jules and threatens to expose Cal. In response, Nate makes Rue insecure about Jules by suggesting that Jules will move on and forget who Rue is. Later, Nate and Maddy peacefully decide to end their relationship, while Rue asks Jules if she is in love with Anna, her fling from the city; Jules admits that she is in love with both Rue and Anna. Rue suggests that she and Jules run away from East Highland.

At the train station, Rue has second thoughts and begs Jules to stay, but Jules begs her to come; Jules ultimately leaves on a train alone. Emotional and heartbroken, Rue goes home and relapses; she experiences a vivid, musical hallucination of a choir. She joins in and the choir starts to dance, the procession in the street resembling a funeral.

== Production ==
=== Writing ===
The title of this episode is a line from Rue. Salting the earth means to ruin a conquered land and it is Rue's response to Jules saying she wants to burn East Highland to the ground. Speculation by many fans of the show and several publications that Rue's narration was from beyond the grave is common. This plot twist is true of Hofit, the drug addict girl from the series which inspired the American show. Writer Sam Levinson dispelled this idea speaking to The Hollywood Reporter, clarifying that "Rue is not dead. That I can say for certain." Levinson revealed that he always envisioned including a musical number sometime during the season, and discussed the prospect with Zendaya following the shooting of the pilot. Levinson ultimately decided to include the sequence to coincide with Rue's relapse, stating: "Seeing [Rue] relapse felt dark to me in a way that doesn't fully encapsulate the cycle and the madness of addiction — how you're thrown back into it and thrown out of it and it's dizzying and at times beautiful but also really fucking terrifying. It just felt like that was the right decision emotionally for the piece, so I had written it in there and it came down to the planning and coordination of it."

=== Filming ===
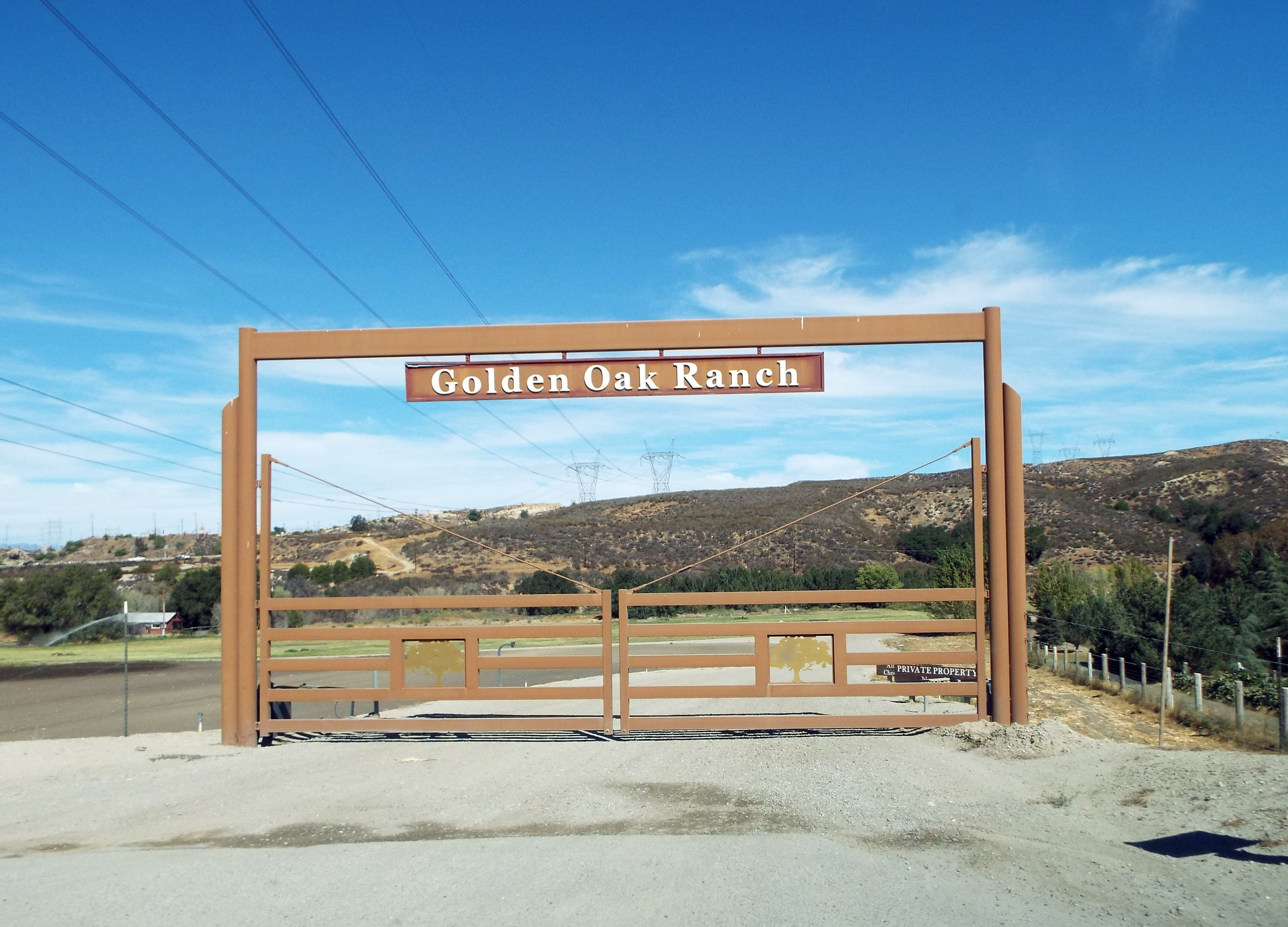
The episode's final musical sequence was filmed at Golden Oak Ranch.

The large musical number performed at the end of the season finale was filmed at Walt Disney Studios' Golden Oak Ranch. It featured Rue "propped up by a crowd" of church gospel dancers, dressed in maroon choir dresses, the same color of Rue's comfort hoodie from her father, as she is "transported into another world", and "rises, then falls into their arms". Levinson commended choreographer Ryan Heffington for creating the "magnificent and beautiful" choreography of the sequence, further stating that "it came together in a way that was more emotional than I ever anticipated."

In an interview with Entertainment Weekly a day after the episode's broadcast, Schafer spoke on the final scene between Rue and Jules: "It was really emotional. It messes with me to see my friends in pain and I can't do anything. When we were shooting that scene, it's just like we were standing on that train platform and the train for hours, but all I could do as my character was just try to coax Rue onto the train." "And Salt the Earth Behind You" features an intense physical fight between Nate and Cal Jacobs, portrayed by Elordi and Dane respectively. Elordi described the filming of the scene as "physically gruelling", and revealed that he suffered a concussion, explaining: "Eric and I, we're incredibly close, so I basically said to him, "Let's rock and roll and make it sort of as real as possible" [...] I was bleeding. I got a concussion. I ended up throwing up after work. It was gnarly." Elordi called the scene "the most fulfilling thing that I've sort of ever shot", and commended Dane and Levinson: "I definitely couldn't have done it without Eric and Sam kind of walking me through it and helping me out."

=== Music ===
A reworked version of the series composer Labrinth's song "All for Us" from his album Imagination & the Misfit Kid with vocals from Zendaya in character as Rue, is hinted at throughout season 1 before being sung fully as the finale musical piece. During an appearance on Quotidien, Zendaya revealed she personally selected "A Song for You" by Donny Hathaway to play in the season 1 finale. Other licensed songs in the episode include "Euphoria" by BTS, "Blow the Whistle" by Too Short, "Mi Gente" by J Balvin and Willy William and "My Body Is a Cage" by Arcade Fire.

== Reception ==
=== Ratings ===
Viewership and ratings per episode of And Salt the Earth Behind You
No.	Title	Air date	Rating/share (18–49)	Viewers (millions)	DVR (18–49)	DVR viewers (millions)	Total (18–49)	Total viewers (millions)
8	"And Salt the Earth Behind You"	August 4, 2019	0.21	0.530	0.12	0.273	0.273	0.803

=== Critical reviews ===
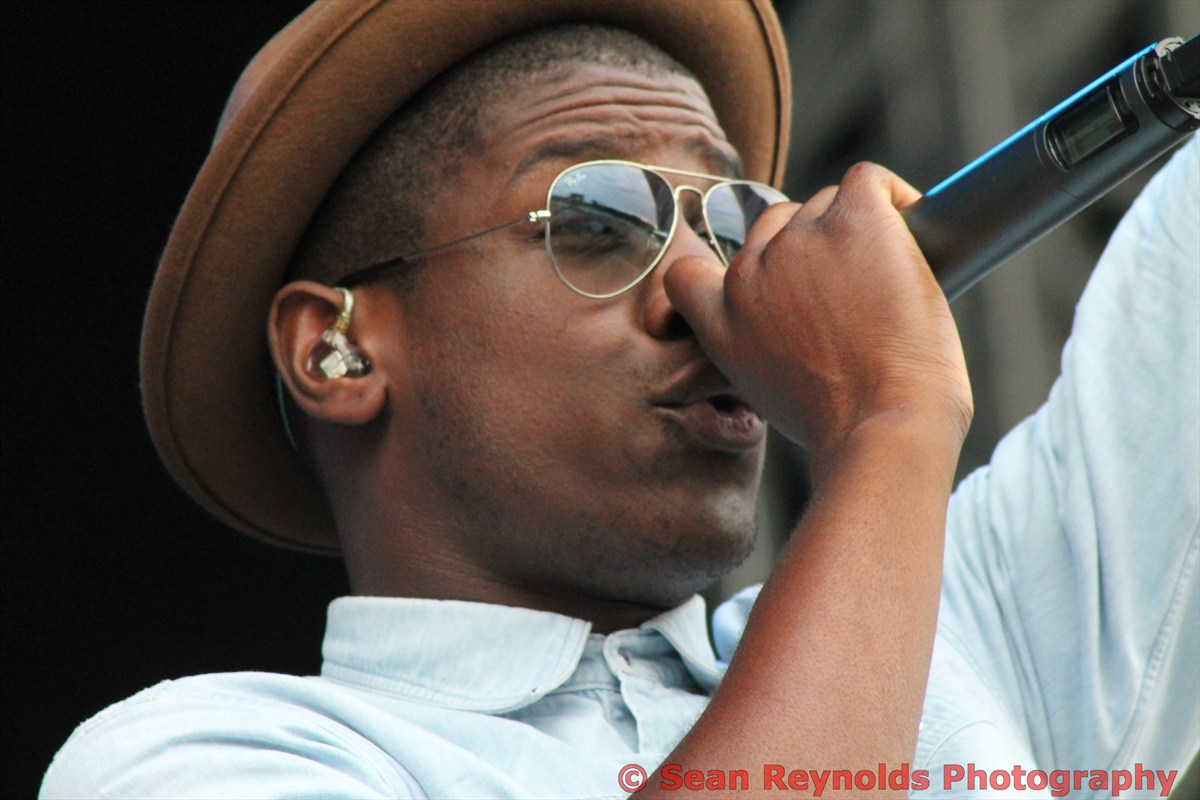
Labrinth's version of his song "All for Us" in "And Salt the Earth Behind You" won him a Primetime Emmy Award.

In a ranking of the first two seasons and specials, BuzzFeed listed "And Salt the Earth Behind You" at five out of eighteen, writing: "Mix in the heartbreaking scene of Cassie getting an abortion, and Jules's decision to leave Rue at the train station, and you've got a tragicomedy Shakespeare wishes he could have concocted. The whole season then concludes with Rue's relapse, depicted as a musical maelstrom where she's carried down the street by a company of burgundy dancers." IndieWire placed it in third in a list which included season three's premiere "Ándale", writing that it was "a deliciously dramatic finale installment that builds to the most meaningful musical moment in the entire series." They added that the episode was an "end of an era for Levinson" and "the last we saw of Euphoria before it went off the rails."

In a review for Vox, Constance Grady praised the earnest and character-focused tone of the finale, writing "Euphoria finally revealed its true self [...] when it's at its best, it's an intimate teen drama that uses its sophisticated visual vocabulary to evoke the way adolescence feels, even if the lighting is never quite so good in real life." She also praised the final moments, writing: "[The season finale] leaps into a new method of storytelling for the show, one that marries its sincerity with its surreal visual vocabulary to enter into a new emotional mode." Concluding an essay on the episode, Black Nerd Problems remarked that it was the "best surrealist realism teen story written from the page to the screen." Joshua St. Clair of Men's Health commented on the finale's unique narrative frames, writing, "[The finale is] interspersed with enough preceding character drama and face zooms to make you feel both sick and overwhelmed, which we guess was kinda the point."

Allison Herman of The Ringer described the finale as "unwieldy and uneven, yet endearingly so." Herman praised the cast's performances, particularly Zendaya and Schafer, and spoke positively of the careful handling of Cassie's abortion, writing: "Cassie's abortion is played almost completely straight, a wise choice that pays off. The less Euphoria has relied on cheap tricks—the more it realizes its protagonists are enough to stand on their own—the better it's become." Allie Pape of Vulture commended the final musical number, writing, "Regardless of interpretation, the sequence is a masterpiece, perfectly balancing the grand spectacle of a traditional musical finale with Euphoria's unique visual palette." However, Pape criticized the overall lack of character development for the show's secondary characters, particularly Fezco and Lexi, and described Elordi's acting as "comically awful" during Nate's fight with Cal. In a mixed assessment of the finale, Kayla Kumari Upadhyaya of The A.V. Club highly praised the cast's performances but ultimately described the episode as a "jumbled mess", further stating: "The finale drops a lot of the plot and character work it has been doing in favor of this experimental, fragmented form."

=== Accolades ===
The episode was Euphoria's submission for three of its nominations at the 72nd Primetime Creative Arts Emmy Awards. Leber and Jen Malone were nominated for the Primetime Emmy Award for Outstanding Music Supervision. Labrinth's "All for Us" won him the Primetime Emmy Award for Outstanding Original Music and Lyrics. Doniella Davy, Kirsten Sage Coleman and Tara Lang Shah's cosmetics also won the final presented Primetime Emmy Award for Outstanding Makeup for a Single-Camera Series (Non-Prosthetic) before the category was split along contemporary and period/fantasy/sci-fi lines rather than ongoing series and miniseries/movie.

"All for Us" also won Labrinth as a musician and Zendaya as a performer the Hollywood Music in Media Award for Best Original Song in a TV Show/Limited Series in 2021. Kay Lee's production design in this episode and the previous was honored at the Art Directors Guild Awards 2019 with a nomination for Excellence in Production Design for a One-Hour Contemporary Single-Camera Series.
