= Make-Up Artists & Hair Stylists Guild Awards 2019 =

Entertainment award

- Date: February 16, 2020
- Site: The Beverly Hilton, California

The 2020 Make-Up Artists and Hair Stylists Guild Awards, honoring the best make-up and hairstyling in film and television for 2019, the winners were announced on February 16, 2020 while the nominees were announced on January 10, 2020.

== Winners and nominees ==
=== Feature-Length Motion Picture ===
==== Best Contemporary Make-Up ====
- Bombshell – Vivian Baker, Cristina Waltz, Richard Redlefsen
  - Avengers: Endgame – John Blake, Francisco Perez
  - Hustlers – Margot Boccia, Roxanne Rizzo
  - John Wick: Parabellum – Stephen M. Kelley, Anna Stachow
  - Us – Scott Wheeler, Tym Shutchai Buacharern, Sabrina Castro

==== Best Contemporary Hair Styling ====
- Bombshell – Anne Morgan, Jaime Leigh McIntosh, Adruitha Lee
  - Hustlers – Angel De Angelis, Dierdre Harris
  - John Wick: Parabellum – Kerrie Smith, Therese Ducey
  - Joker – Kay Georgiou, Vanessa Anderson
  - The Laundromat – Marie Larkin, Yvette Stone, J. Roy Helland

==== Best Period and/or Character Make-Up ====
- Joker – Nicki Ledermann, Tania Ribalow, Sunday Englis
  - Dolemite Is My Name – Vera Steimberg, Debra Denson, Deborah Huss-Humphries
  - Downton Abbey – Anne Nosh Oldham, Elaine Browne, Sam Smart
  - Once Upon a Time in Hollywood – Heba Thorisdottir, Gregory Funk
  - Rocketman – Lizzie Yianni Georgiou, Tapio Salmi, Laura Solari

==== Best Period and/or Character Hair Styling ====
- Downton Abbey – Anne Nosh Oldham, Elaine Browne, Marc Pilcher
  - Dolemite Is My Name – Carla Joi Farmer, Stacey Morris, Linda Villalobos
  - Maleficent: Mistress of Evil – Audrey Futterman-Stern
  - Once Upon a Time in Hollywood – Janine Rath-Thompson, Michelle Diamantides
  - Rocketman – Lizzie Yianni Georgiou, Tapio Salmi, Laura Solari

==== Best Special Make-Up Effects ====
- Bombshell – Kazu Hiro, Vivian Baker, Richard Redlefsen
  - Captain Marvel – Brian Sipe, Alexei Dmitiew, Sabrina Wilson
  - The Irishman – Mike Marino, Mike Fontaine, Carla White
  - It Chapter Two – Sean Sansom, Shane Zander, Iantha Goldberg
  - Rocketman – Barrie Gower, Lizzie Yianni Georgiou, Victoria Money

=== Television Series, Miniseries or New Media Series ===
==== Best Contemporary Make-Up ====
- Big Little Lies – Michelle Radow, Erin Good-Rosenmann
  - Euphoria – Doniella Davy, Kirsten Coleman
  - Grace and Frankie – Melissa Sandora, David DeLeon, Bonita DeHaven
  - Russian Doll – Amy L. Forsythe, Heidi Pakdel, Danielle Minnella
  - The Handmaid's Tale – Burton LeBlanc, Alastair Muir, Faye Crasto

==== Best Contemporary Hair Styling ====
- Big Little Lies - Jose Zamora, Lorena Zamora, Lona Vigi
  - Black-ish – Araxi Lindsey, Enoch Williams
  - Empire – Melissa Forney, Al Payne, Nolan Kelly
  - Grace and Frankie – Kelly Kline, Jonathan Hanousek, Marlene Williams
  - The Handmaid's Tale – Paul Elliot, Ewa Latak-Cynk

==== Best Period and/or Character Make-Up ====
- Fosse/Verdon – Debbie Zoller, Dave Presto, Jackie Risotto
  - American Horror Story: 1984 – Carleigh Herbert, Michael Mekash, Abby Clawson
  - Chernobyl – Daniel Parker, Natasha Nikolic-Dunlop
  - Game of Thrones – Jane Walker, Kay Bilk
  - GLOW – Lana Horochowski, Maurine Burke

==== Best Period and/or Character Hair Styling ====
- Fosse/Verdon – Christopher Fulton, Christen Edwards, Christine Cantrell
  - American Horror Story: 1984 – Michelle Ceglia, Analyn Cruz, Taschi Lynell
  - Chernobyl – Daniel Parker, Julio Parodi, Bozena Maise Jenko
  - GLOW – Theraesa Rivers, Valerie Jackson
  - Pose – Barry Lee Moe, Timothy Harvey, Sabana Majeed

==== Best Special Make-Up Effects ====
- Chernobyl – Daniel Parker, Barrie Gower, Paul Spateri
  - American Horror Story: 1984 – Michael Mekash, Vincent Van Dyke, Carleigh Herbert
  - Fosse/Verdon – Debbie Zoller, Vincent Van Dyke, Dave Presto
  - Game of Thrones – Barrie Gower, Sarah Gower
  - Star Trek: Discovery – Glen Hetrick, James MacKinnon, Rocky Faulkner

=== Motion Picture for Television or Special ===
==== Best Contemporary Make-Up ====
- Saturday Night Live – Louie Zakarian, Amy Tagliamonti, Jason Milani
  - American Idol – Tonia Green, Gina Ghiglieri, Michelle Chung
  - Dancing with the Stars – Julie Socash, Alison Gladieux, Donna Bard
  - So You Think You Can Dance – Tonia Green, Silvia Leczel, Alison Gladieux
  - World of Dance – Tonia Green, Danielle Rush

==== Best Contemporary Hair Styling ====
- Dancing with the Stars – Mary Guerrero, Kimi Messina, Gail Ryan
  - America's Got Talent – Dean Banowetz, Ryan Randall, Cory Rotenberg
  - So You Think You Can Dance – Dean Banowetz, Melanie Verkins, Ryan Randall
  - The Voice – Jerilynn Stephens, Meagan Herrera-Schaaf, Amber Maher
  - World of Dance – Dean Banowetz, Meagan Herrera-Schaaf, Cory Rotenberg

==== Best Period and/or Character Make-Up ====
- Saturday Night Live – Louie Zakarian, Amy Tagliamonti, Jason Milani
  - Deadwood: The Movie – Lana Horochowski, Maurine Burke, Lesa Nielsen Duff
  - Live in Front of a Studio Audience: Norman Lear's "All in the Family" and "The Jefferson's" – Patty Bunch, Farah Bunch
  - Patsy & Loretta – Jori Jenae McGuire, Julie Callihan, Laura Godwin
  - Rent: Live – Zena Shteysel Green, Angela Moos, Donna Bard

==== Best Period and/or Character Hairstyling ====
- Deadwood: The Movie – Melissa Yonkey, Laine Trzinski, Jose Zamora
  - Live in Front of a Studio Audience: Norman Lear's "All in the Family" and "The Jefferson's" – Tim Burke, Pixie Schwartz, Conrad Hilton
  - Patsy & Loretta – Yvette Stone, Teresa Morgan
  - Rent: Live – Barry Lee Moe, April Schuller, Erica Adams

==== Best Special Make-Up Effects ====
- Saturday Night Live – Louie Zakarian, Jason Milani, Tom Denier Jr.
  - 2019 MTV Video Music Awards – Angelique Velez, Kyle Krueger
  - 6 Underground – Jana Carboni, Leonardo Cruciano
  - Celebrity Big Brother – Tyson Fountaine, Brian Penikas, Scott Wheeler
  - Paddleton – Vyvy Tran

=== Daytime Television ===
==== Best Make-Up ====
- The Real – Melanie Mills, Uzmee Krakovszki, Motoko Honjo-Clayton
  - The Bold and the Beautiful – Christine Lai Johnson, Chris Escobosa, Stacey Alfano
  - Dr. Phil – Cool Benson, Alan Bosshardt, Christina Patch
  - The Price Is Right – Carol Wood
  - The Young and the Restless – Patricia Denney, Kathy Jones, Laura Schaffer Holmes

==== Best Hairstyling ====
- The Real - Roberta Gardener-Rogers, Noogie Thai, Ray Dodson
  - Dr. Phil – Mimi Vodnoy-Love, Annette Jones
  - The Bold and the Beautiful – Lisa Long, Danielle Spencer, Lauren Larsen
  - The Young and the Restless – Adriana Lucio, Regina Rodriquez, Lauren Mendoza

=== Children and Teen Television Programming ===
==== Best Make-Up ====
- A Series of Unfortunate Events – Rita Ciccozzi, Tanya Hudson, Krista Seller
  - All That – Michael Johnston, Melanie Mills, Allan Apone
  - Henry Danger – Michael Johnston, Patti Brand-Reese, Brad Look
  - Just Add Magic – Myriam Arougheti, Merry Lee Traum
  - No Good Nick – Myriam Arougheti, Merry Lee Traum, Jacklynn Evans

==== Best Hairstyling ====
- A Series of Unfortunate Events – Julie McHaffie, Dianne Holme
  - All That – Joe Matke, Dwayne Ross, Roma Goddard
  - Fuller House – Anna Maria Orzano, Sandra Munk
  - Malibu Rescue – Pavy Olivarez, Monique Hyman, Laura Caponera
  - Lip Sync Battle Shorties – Jerilynn Stephens, Kathleen Leonard, Cory Rotenberg

=== Commercials and Music Videos ===
==== Best Make-Up ====
- Pose: Promo Campaign – Kerry Herta, Sherri Lawrence
  - All That – Michael Johnston, Melanie Mills, Brad Look
  - Botched: Season 6 Promo – Jason Collins, Carlton Coleman, Michael McCarty
  - GEICO: "A Witch for a Third Roommate" – Dominie Till, Pepe Mora
  - Spectrum Communications "Warehouse The 'Good/Evil'" Ad Campaign – Edward French, Kevin Haney, Bruce Fuller

==== Best Hairstyling ====
- Pose: Promo Campaign – Joe Matke, Fernando Navarro, Barry Lee Moe
  - Budweiser - Reserve Copper Lager Commercial – Enzo Angileri
  - Something Amazing – Craig Gangi, Naomi Bakstad
  - Weird Al Yankovic: Press Promo-Off Camera with Sam Jones – Sean James Cummins

=== Theatrical Production ===
==== Best Make-Up ====
- Cats – Jakey Hicks, Sierra Peterson
  - Into the Woods – Vanessa Dionne, Donna Levy, Jeff Knaggs
  - La bohème – Darren Jinks, Brandi Strona
  - Reefer Madness – Michael Johnston, Fernando Navarro, Lauren Lillien
  - Sweeney Todd: The Demon Barber of Fleet Street – Sharon Peng, Raven Winter

==== Best Hairstyling ====
- Hamilton – Charles LaPointe, Daryl Terry
  - Cats – Jakey Hicks, Sierra Peterson, Chanthy Tach
  - Into the Woods – Vanessa Dionne, Stephanie Fenner, Jeff Knaggs
  - La bohème – Darren Jinks, Raquel Bianchini, Linda Cardenas
  - Sweeney Todd: The Demon Barber of Fleet Street – Sharon Peng, Raven Winter
