= Kimberly Kimble =

American hair stylist

Kimberly Kimble (born December 24, 1971) is an American hair stylist from Chicago, Illinois. She is most recognized for her starring role work on WE tv's L.A. Hair. Currently, she is the head of the hair department of HBO television series Euphoria. Some of her celebrity clientele include Beyoncé, Brandy Norwood, Kelly Rowland, Nicki Minaj, Mary J. Blige, Halle Berry, Shakira, and Zendaya.

== Early life ==
As a child, Kimble played with cut-out magazine pictures and paper dolls. Kimble stated, "I was into fashion and beauty and showing my creative side from the age of 2 or 3. Because my mom worked all the time, I was alone a lot but I want to say that I'm so glad for that because I knew at a young age what I wanted to do." After finishing beauty school, she worked at her mother's salon. Kimble is a third generation hair stylist in her family.

== Career ==
Kimble's celebrity hair-styling career started when she worked with Halle Berry on B*A*P*S. She has had her techniques and innovative stylings featured internationally in Vanity Fair, Essence, Glamour, and Vogue.

In 2012, Kimble began filming the reality television series L.A. Hair. The show debuted May 31, 2012, and ended on March 9, 2017.

Starting in Season 2 of HBO television series, Euphoria, Kimble became head of the hair department.
