= Marcell Rév =

Hungarian cinematographer (born 1984)

- Born: December 30, 1984 (age 41); Budapest, Hungary
- Occupation: Cinematographer
- Years active: 2009–present
- Website: www.marcellrev.com

Marcell Rév (born December 30, 1984) is a Hungarian cinematographer. He is best known for his collaborations with directors Kornél Mundruczó in the films White God (2014) and Jupiter's Moon (2017) and Sam Levinson in the HBO series Euphoria and The Idol and the films Malcolm & Marie (2021) and Assassination Nation (2018).

== Early life and education ==
Rév was born in Budapest, Hungary.

He studied filmmaking at University of Theatre and Film Arts in Budapest.

== Career ==
In 2022, Rév won the Primetime Emmy Award for Outstanding Cinematography for a Series (One Hour) for the Euphoria episode "The Theater and Its Double".

He has been a member of the American Society of Cinematographers since December 2022.

== Filmography ==
=== Film ===
Year	Title	Director
2012	Balázs (18) filmje - jp.co.de	Péter Fancsikai
2014	Land of Storms	Ádám Császi
2014	White God	Kornél Mundruczó
2016	Most of the Souls That Live Here	Igor Buharov; Ivan Buharov
2017	Jupiter's Moon	Kornél Mundruczó
2018	Assassination Nation	Sam Levinson
2021	Malcolm & Marie	Sam Levinson
2021	The Story of My Wife	Ildikó Enyedi
2023	Fingernails	Christos Nikou
2026	Company	Casey Affleck
TBA	Séance on a Wet Afternoon	Tomas Alfredson

Documentary film

Year	Title	Director	Notes
2010	Demon Hands	Eszter Hajdú	
2011	Allah minden napján szaladnak a lovak	Anna Kis	With Tamás Dobos
2013	CEU20	Peter O. Almond; Erika Kapronczai	
2013	Overdose: Vágta egy álomért	Gábor Ferenczi	
2015	Balaton Method	Bálint Szimler	

Concert special

Year	Title	Artist	Director
2023	Endless Summer Vacation (Backyard Sessions)	Miley Cyrus	Jacob Bixenman; Brendan Walter
2023	Renaissance: A Film by Beyoncé	Beyoncé	
2025	Lady Gaga in Harlequin Live: One Night Only	Lady Gaga	Lady Gaga; Michael Polansky

=== Television ===
Year	Title	Director	Notes
2018	Paterno	Barry Levinson	TV movie
2019–2026	Euphoria	Augustine Frizzell; Sam Levinson	13 episodes
2023	The Idol	Sam Levinson	5 episodes
2023	The Changeling	Melina Matsoukas	Episode: "First Comes Love"

=== Music video ===
Year	Title	Artist	Ref.
2019	"Solita"	Kali Uchis	
2021	"We're Good"	Dua Lipa	
2022	"Don't Forget My Love"	Diplo and Miguel	
2023	"Flowers"	Miley Cyrus	
2023	"Used to Be Young"	Miley Cyrus	
2023	"Where She Goes"	Bad Bunny	
2023	"Baticano"	Bad Bunny	
2024	"Vintage"	Moses Sumney	
2024	"Godspeed"	Camila Cabello	
2024	"Disease"	Lady Gaga	
2024	"Squabble Up"	Kendrick Lamar	
2025	"Sports Car"	Tate McRae	

== Awards and nominations ==
Year	Award	Category	Work	Result	Ref.
2022	Primetime Emmy Awards	Outstanding Cinematography for a Series (One Hour)	Euphoria, "The Theater and Its Double"	Won	
2023	MTV Video Music Awards	Best Cinematography	Miley Cyrus − "Flowers"	Nominated	
