= Julio C. Perez IV =

American film editor

- Occupation: Film editor
- Years active: 2002–present

Julio C. Perez IV is an American film editor. He won a Primetime Emmy Award and was nominated for another one in the category Outstanding Picture Editing for his work on the television program Europhia.
