= Doniella Davy =

American makeup artist

- Born: Venice, California
- Occupation: Makeup artist

Doniella Davy, also known as Donni Davy, is an American makeup artist and film/TV makeup department head. She is most known for her work on HBO’s epic teen drama Euphoria. In 2022, she co-founded beauty brand Half Magic Beauty along with A24.

== Early life ==
Davy was born and raised in Venice, CA. With a background in photography, painting and drawing, Davy moved to Brooklyn, New York to attend Pratt Institute. She graduated with a BFA in photography in 2010.

== Career ==
In 2012, Davy started her makeup career by taking a crash course in special effects and beauty makeup with established film industry makeup department head, Jane Galli.

After answering numerous makeup ads on Craigslist, Davy began practicing her craft by working with film students in Los Angeles. These early days working on student films led her to eventually land her first narrative feature film job, Kicks, as the makeup department head. Davy would then work on 2017 Best Picture Academy Award-winner Moonlight, as well as Under the Silver Lake, If Beale Street Could Talk, and Euphoria.

In 2020, Davy won an Emmy for Outstanding Contemporary Makeup on Euphoria. She won her second Emmy for Outstanding Contemporary Makeup on Euphoria in 2022.

== Personal life ==
Davy lives in east Los Angeles with her husband.
