= Euphoria season 1 =

2019 television series season

Euphoria
- Season 1
- Promotional poster
- Showrunner: Sam Levinson
- Starring: Zendaya; Maude Apatow; Angus Cloud; Eric Dane; Alexa Demie; Jacob Elordi; Barbie Ferreira; Nika King; Storm Reid; Hunter Schafer; Algee Smith; Sydney Sweeney
- No. of episodes: 8

Release
- Original network: HBO
- Original release: June 16 – August 4, 2019

Season chronology
- Next → Specials

The first season of the American teen drama television series Euphoria, inspired by Ron Leshem's miniseries of the same name, premiered on HBO on June 16, 2019. Series creator Sam Levinson serves as showrunner for the season. The season centers on teenage addict Rue Bennett as she struggles to get sober, find her place in the world, and adjust to her relationships after drug rehabilitation. Zendaya stars as Rue alongside an ensemble cast consisting of Maude Apatow, Angus Cloud, Eric Dane, Alexa Demie, Jacob Elordi, Barbie Ferreira, Nika King, Storm Reid, Hunter Schafer, Algee Smith, and Sydney Sweeney.

In June 2017, development began on an American adaptation of the Israeli series Euphoria. In March 2018, HBO gave a pilot order, to be written by Levinson and directed by Augustine Frizzell. The show was greenlit for a full season in July; filming commenced in October and wrapped in May 2019. The season consists of eight episodes and generally received critical acclaim. At the 72nd Primetime Emmy and Creative Arts Awards, the season received three awards of its six nominations. Most notably, Zendaya won for Outstanding Lead Actress in a Drama Series. The season was followed by two one-hour specials in December 2020 and January 2021, before a second season was released in 2022.

== Cast and characters ==
=== Main ===
- Zendaya as Rue Bennett
- Maude Apatow as Lexi Howard
- Angus Cloud as Fezco O'Neill
- Eric Dane as Cal Jacobs
- Alexa Demie as Maddy Perez
- Jacob Elordi as Nate Jacobs
- Barbie Ferreira as Kat Hernandez
- Nika King as Leslie Bennett
- Storm Reid as Gia Bennett
- Hunter Schafer as Jules Vaughn
- Algee Smith as Chris McKay
- Sydney Sweeney as Cassie Howard

=== Recurring ===
- Alanna Ubach as Suze Howard
- John Ales as David Vaughn
- Lukas Gage as Tyler Clarkson
- Bruce Wexler as Robert Bennett
- Sophia Rose Wilson as BB
- Tyler Timmons as Troy McKay
- Tristan Timmons as Roy McKay
- Javon "Wanna" Walton as Ashtray
- Austin Abrams as Ethan Daley
- Keean Johnson as Daniel Dimarco
- Colman Domingo as Ali Muhammad
- Paula Marshall as Marsha Jacobs
- Zak Steiner as Aaron Jacobs
- Mercedes Colon as Kat's Mom
- Tyler Chase as Custer
- Meeko as Mouse
- Marsha Gambles as Miss Marsha
- Brynda Mattox as Marie O'Neill

== Episodes ==
| No. overall | No. in season | Title | Directed by | Written by | Original release date | U.S. viewers (millions) |
|---|---|---|---|---|---|---|
| 1 | 1 | "Pilot" | Augustine Frizzell | Sam Levinson | June 16, 2019 | 0.577 |
In childhood, Rue Bennett struggles with many mental disorders and her father's death from cancer, which leads to addiction. As a teenager, Rue returns home from rehab and immediately goes to her dealer Fezco O'Neill for drugs. New girl in East Highland, Jules Vaughn is invited by her friend, Kat Hernandez, to a party hosted by popular college freshman Chris McKay. Rue uses her childhood friend Lexi Howard's urine to cheat at a drug test her mother Leslie makes her take. Before the party, Jules hooks up at a motel with an older man from a hookup app after lying about her age. At the party, Kat loses her virginity. Lexi's older sister Cassie gets upset when McKay chokes her during sex, but he stops and they discuss it. Popular cheerleader Maddy Perez, who recently broke up with star quarterback Nate Jacobs, has public revenge sex with college student Tyler Clarkson. Angered by this, Nate drunkenly harasses Jules, and she threatens him with a knife before cutting her arm. Rue introduces herself to Jules and goes home with her. Nate returns home and encounters his father, Cal, who was Jules' hookup.
| 2 | 2 | "Stuntin' Like My Daddy" | Sam Levinson | Sam Levinson | June 23, 2019 | 0.574 |
In childhood, Nate discovers his father Cal's amateur pornography. As a teenager, Nate develops severe anger issues and extreme over protectiveness of Maddy. In the present, Rue breaks down in class when forced to talk about her summer, and she lashes out when Lexi attempts to comfort her. Rue reminisces about trying oxycodone for the first time at thirteen, stealing from her dying father's prescription. Kat discovers that the amateur video of her having sex at McKay's party is popular online and realizes she can make money as a webcam model. After a pep rally in the cafeteria, Nate offers Maddy a date. Nate breaks into Tyler's apartment, accuses him of Maddy's statutory rape, then brutally beats and robs him. Fezco's dangerous supplier Mouse coerces Rue into taking fentanyl. Rue begins to black out, and without the money to pay for her high, Mouse looks to take advantage of her until Fezco steps in to pay. After Mouse leaves, Fezco calls Jules to drive Rue to her place, where Jules starts messaging on the dating app with Nate, who catfishes her by adopting the name "Tyler" and the username "ShyGuy118".
| 3 | 3 | "Made You Look" | Sam Levinson | Sam Levinson | June 30, 2019 | 0.493 |
In childhood, Kat abruptly gains weight on a family vacation. Her middle-school boyfriend, Daniel Dimarco breaks up with her. She retreats into the world of romance and becomes a popular online fanfiction writer. In the present, Kat starts to work as a camgirl, catering to a series of submissive men with financial domination fetishes. Jules tells Rue she will stop being friends with her if she keeps using drugs. At her Narcotics Anonymous meeting, Rue says she is sixty days sober; another attendee, Ali Muhammed, tells her he knows she is lying. Rue helps Jules take nudes of herself after Nate sends her a dick pic, and she steals pills from Jules' kitchen. Maddy is shocked to find pictures of penises on Nate's phone. Rue and Jules argue after Jules reveals her plans to meet "Tyler" alone at night. Shortly thereafter, Rue goes to Jules' house to apologize and ends up kissing her. Panicked at the thought of alienating Jules, Rue visits Fezco to get drugs; Fezco, afraid for her well-being, refuses to sell her any and locks her out of his house. Upset, Rue tearfully blames Fezco for her addiction. She then calls Ali for help.
| 4 | 4 | "Shook Ones Pt. II" | Sam Levinson | Sam Levinson | July 7, 2019 | 0.609 |
In childhood, Jules is admitted to a psychiatric hospital by her mother because of her problems with self-harm. Her parents later separate and she deals with her childhood gender dysphoria through gender transition. In the present, Nate and Maddy have an argument at a traveling carnival, and Nate grabs her by the throat after she publicly insults his family. McKay upsets Cassie by refusing to acknowledge her as his girlfriend. Cassie and Maddy take MDMA, and Cassie flirts with Daniel. Kat hangs out with Ethan Daley, a classmate who has a crush on her, but becomes jealous when she incorrectly assumes he is flirting with another girl and ends up having sex with an older boy. Rue looks for her sister, Gia, and finds her high on cannabis. Jules recognizes Cal as her hookup. Cal confronts Jules, begging her not to reveal their secret; she assures him that she will not tell anyone. After the carnival, Jules meets up with "Tyler" and discovers he is Nate. Nate blackmails her, threatening to report the nude pictures Jules has sent him as child pornography unless she keeps quiet about her relationship with his father. Jules goes to Rue's house and they kiss.
| 5 | 5 | " '03 Bonnie and Clyde" | Jennifer Morrison | Sam Levinson | July 14, 2019 | 0.579 |
In childhood, Maddy loses interest in the idea of working after her mother Sonia stops her from participating in child beauty pageants. She eventually finds herself in a toxic relationship with Nate, culminating in his attack on her at the carnival. In the present, Rue tells her mother that she is dating Jules. Maddy tries to hide the injuries on her neck, but they are discovered after she passes out at school and a police investigation begins; Sonia presses charges against Nate. Jules gets frustrated when Rue dismisses her situation with Cal. Ali does not believe that Rue's and Jules' relationship will last, scaring Rue. Cassie reconciles with McKay, who apologizes for his behavior at the carnival. Kat is cold toward Ethan, who does not understand why. Kat has a sexual encounter with clothing store clerk Trevor about whom she had previously fantasized. Rue apologizes to Lexi for having been a bad friend and invites her to go roller skating with her and Jules. Cal questions the effects him being closeted has had on Nate. Maddy meets Nate at a motel. After roller skating, Jules takes Rue home with her, but cannot sleep.
| 6 | 6 | "The Next Episode" | Pippa Bianco | Sam Levinson | July 21, 2019 | 0.569 |
In childhood, McKay is pressured by his father to be a professional American football player, and is advised to bottle up his emotions. In college, McKay realizes his odds of making it to the NFL are slim. In the present, Nate is suspended from school and socially ostracized. Nate breaks into Tyler's apartment and coerces him into confessing to choking Maddy. He also blackmails Jules into telling the police that she saw Tyler attack Maddy. Cassie attends a Halloween party with McKay, where his fraternity brothers violently haze him. Afterwards, McKay uncontrollably sobs in the bathroom before composing himself; he then engages in aggressive sex with Cassie, leaving her in tears. At Daniel's Halloween party, Rue feels left out as the only sober one, and senses that something is off with Jules, who drinks heavily and falls in the swimming pool. Daniel harshly scolds Cassie when she refuses to have sex with him. Cassie returns home and realizes that her period is late. Nate and Maddy arrive at Daniel's party and are applauded by the partygoers; Rue becomes suspicious when she sees Jules' reaction.
| 7 | 7 | "The Trials and Tribulations of Trying to Pee While Depressed" | Sam Levinson | Sam Levinson | July 28, 2019 | 0.549 |
Cassie's parents get divorced when she is in her early teens. After a car crash, her father descends into drug addiction and poverty and abandons their family. She frequently enters exploitative sexual relationships with her peers until she meets McKay. In the present, Rue falls into a depression after Jules grows distant, causing her bladder to shut down. After she figures out what Nate did to Jules, Rue asks Fezco to intimidate him. He does so, but Nate retaliates by anonymously reporting Fezco to the police, forcing Fezco and Ashtray to dispose of their stash when the police come to their home. Maddy confronts Kat over her new, assertive persona. Kat ends a cam session with a high-paying client when it makes her uncomfortable. Cassie tells McKay she is pregnant. He is overwhelmed and suggests she get an abortion. Jules visits TC, a friend from her old town, and meets TC's roommate, Anna. Jules and Anna go clubbing, take psychedelics, and share a sexual experience, during which Jules hallucinates about both Nate and Rue. She texts Rue the next morning to tell her that she misses her.
| 8 | 8 | "And Salt the Earth Behind You" | Sam Levinson | Sam Levinson | August 4, 2019 | 0.530 |
Rue and Jules reconcile as Rue recovers in the hospital after a kidney infection. Nate is unable to sexually perform with Maddy, who confronts him about his sexual orientation, after which Nate attacks her. Maddy steals a sex tape of Cal and Jules that Nate has in his possession, later watching it in shock. Nate wins his final high school football game, but Cal criticizes his performance. Nate attempts to fight him but after being subdued, begins to hit himself, leaving Cal shaken. Cassie gets an abortion with her family's support. Fezco breaks into Mouse's supplier's house and robs him in order to pay Mouse. At their school's winter formal, Kat seeks out Ethan and apologizes for her behavior. Rue confronts Nate, threatening to expose Cal. Nate taunts her about Jules' loyalty. After spending the night trying to make each other jealous, Nate and Maddy decide to peacefully end their relationship. Jules tells Rue that she is in love with both her and Anna. Rue and Jules decide to run away from their town together, but Rue backs out at the last minute and Jules leaves on a train alone. A heartbroken Rue returns home and relapses, experiencing a vivid, musical hallucination.

== Production ==
=== Development ===
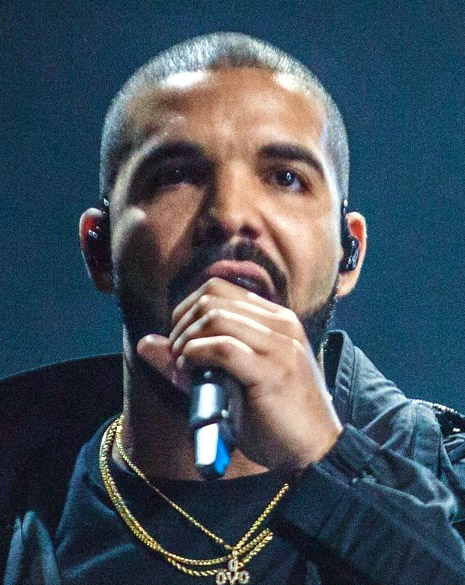
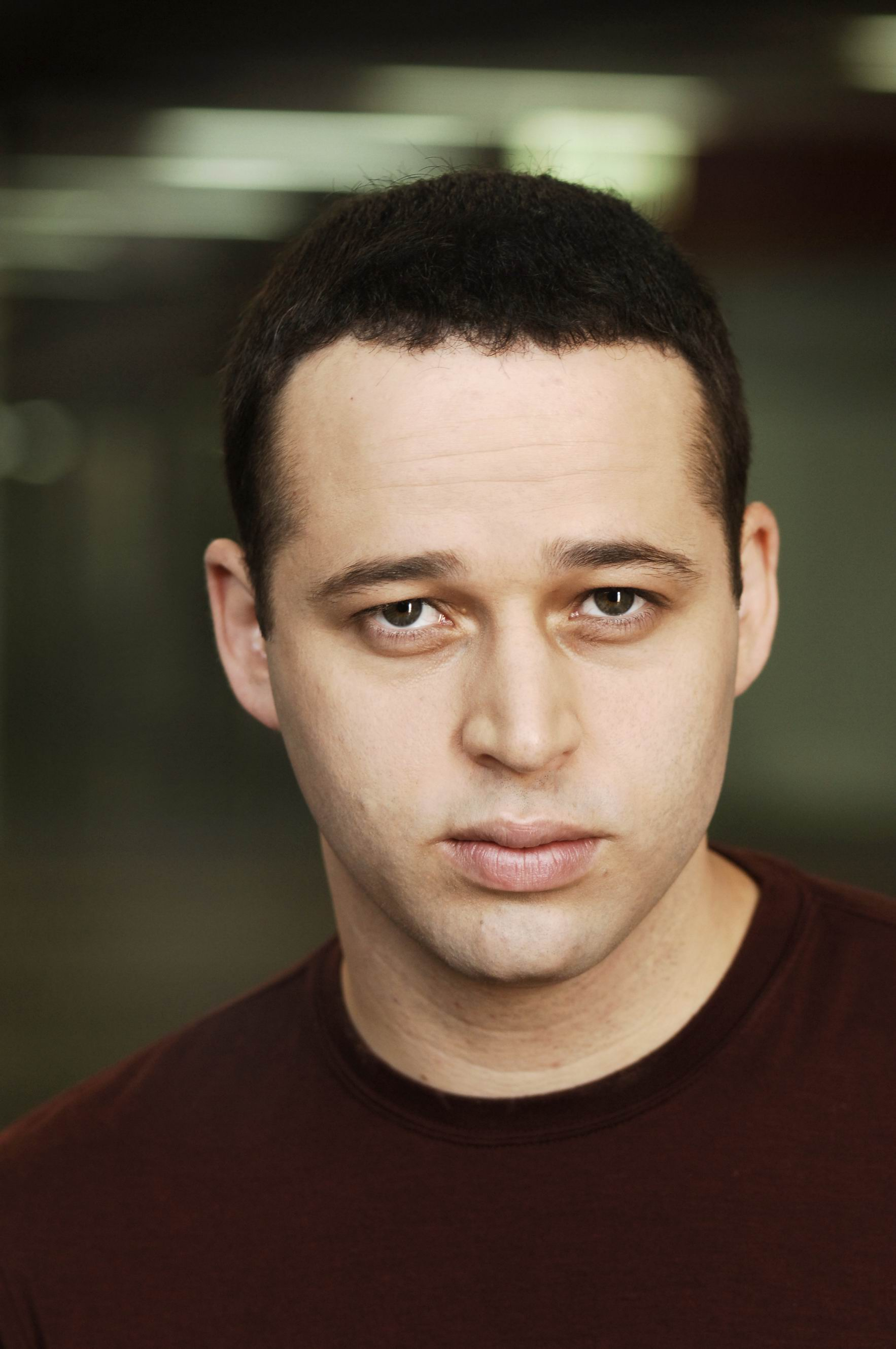
Euphoria season 1's executive producers include Canadian rapper Drake and original series creator Ron Leshem.

In June 2017, Sam Levinson was commissioned by HBO to adapt the 2012 Israeli television series Euphoria, created by Ron Leshem, for the United States. On March 13, 2018, the pilot was ordered by HBO and filmed in Los Angeles, California, in June with Augustine Frizzell directing. Speaking to SAG-AFTRA on landing the lead role of Rue Bennett, Zendaya said she was "in a bit of a weird place" in her career and turning down many scripts before she was sent the first season of Euphoria. Describing the screenplay's writing: "One of the things that was special to me was there was never, like, wasted time. It was always moving, something was happening, there was cutting to something. But not in a way that it was confusing. It just kinda stayed with the track of my brain. So it's like when usually you would tune out or start daydreaming about something else, that's when the scene changes." Deadline Hollywood announced on July 30 that the series was picked for a full season with Drake, Kevin Turen, Gary Lennon, Adel "Future" Nur, Daphna Levin, Hadas Mozes Lichtenstein, Daphna Levin, Ravi Nandan as executive producers, in addition to Levinson, Leshem and Zendaya.

=== Casting ===
Many members of the cast and crew had previously collaborated with Levinson on his 2018 feature film Assassination Nation. Turen had produced the film and it was shot by Hungarian director of photography Marcell Rév, who was also the cinematographer for half the episodes of season 1. Actors Maude Apatow, Colman Domingo and Lukas Gage also appeared in both the film and Euphoria's first season. The rest of the main cast joined the series in October 2018. In June 2019, The Hollywood Reporter alleged that American rapper Stro (Brian Vaughn Bradley Jr.) left the cast in October 2018 due to being "uncomfortable shooting scenes that weren’t in the original pilot script and suggested his character would experiment with homosexuality in future episodes". After "a lengthy back-and-forth with producers", he was subsequently replaced with his Earth to Echo co-star Algee Smith. Cassie's actress Sydney Sweeney said of the recasting "Let’s just say I’m very glad that Algee is playing the character." Zendaya attended the School of Production Design at Oakland School for the Arts with Fezco's actor Angus Cloud. Jack Dylan Grazer was originally cast as Ashtray, but later dropped out before filming and was replaced by Javon Walton.

=== Filming ===
Principal photography for season 1 of Euphoria began on October 15, 2018, and wrapped on May 24, 2019. Like the series premiere, it was shot in and around Los Angeles. Episode five ("'03 Bonnie and Clyde") was directed by Assassination Nation actress Jennifer Morrison, and episode six ("The Next Episode") by Pippa Bianco. These two women, along with Frizzell, are the only directors for Euphoria other than Levinson. Much of the show was filmed on sound stages provided to production by Sony Pictures Studios in Culver City, California. Shooting locations for the season include Alta Dena Dairy in Temple City, California; Travel Inn in North Hills, Los Angeles; Grant High School; Del Amo Fashion Center; Pann's Restaurant in Westchester, Los Angeles; Moonlight Rollerway; Los Angeles Union Station; and Golden Oak Ranch.

=== Music ===
Music supervisors Adam Leber and Jen Malone worked to acquire the extensive licensed music featured in the episodes. A compilation album with eleven tracks from the season (plus two from "Fuck Anyone Who's Not a Sea Blob", the 2021 special episode) was released by Interscope Records on May 14, 2021. Leber got his client British musician Labrinth hired to compose the season's score after playing his music to Levinson. Labrinth initially did not want to use his own voice, but Levinson persuaded him. A soundtrack album with twenty seven tracks was released by Sony Masterworks and Milan Records on October 4, 2019.

== Release ==
Season 1 was promoted with the tagline "Feel something". Many of the episode titles are references to late-1990s and early-2000s song titles that correlate to the episode itself. The season had its red carpet premiere on June 4, 2019. In the United States, the season premiered on June 16, 2019, and concluded on August 4. HBO Asia released each episode a day after its U.S. premiere, along with Foxtel in Australia. In the United Kingdom and the Republic of Ireland, the entire season was released two days after the finale through Sky Atlantic's streaming service Now. The season became available on the New Zealand video on demand service Neon starting on December 6, 2020. The season was included in a DVD collection with the specials and season 2 in November 2022.

== Reception ==
=== Critical response ===
Professional ratings
Aggregate scores
| Source | Rating |
|---|---|
| Rotten Tomatoes | 80% |
| Metacritic | 68/100 |
Review scores
| Source | Rating |
| The Guardian | 4/5 stars |

For the most part, Euphoria season 1 was met with a positive response from critics, with praise for Zendaya and the ensemble's acting, storyline, visuals, and approach to mature subject matter. However, it met with controversy for the amount of drug use and nudity throughout the show. The critical consensus on review aggregator website Rotten Tomatoes reads "a uniquely challenging and illuminating series, held together by a powerfully understated performance from Zendaya". The season has an as overall approval rating of 80%, with an average rating of 7.4/10 based on 100 critical reviews. Using a weighted average, Metacritic, assigned the season a score of 68 out of 100, based on 26 critics, which it describes as "Generally Favorable". Two days before episode one's release, the Parents Television and Media Council pre-emptively scolded HBO for “grossly irresponsible programming.”

The Atlantic's Sophie Gilbert wrote that "the strangest thing about Euphoria’s most quote-unquote shocking interludes is that so few of them seem to be integral to what the show does best. Rue’s fragmented internal state, her frantic desire to use, and the powerful connections she forges with others that momentarily console her, are the most interesting things to watch. Otherwise, the series’ attempts at portraying modern teenagehood can seem exploitative." Benjamin Lee in a The Guardian piece called the season "one of year's best", writing, "There’s specificity in the problems faced by the teens, whether it’s how pornography has mutated the idea of real-world sex or how to rationalise depressive thoughts when you’re fully aware of your own privilege, and each episode available entered new, enticingly uncharted territory." Sonia Saraiya of Vanity Fair wrote that "Zendaya carries unsettling, gorgeous Euphoria" adding that "HBO’s first foray into young adult drama is graphic, but there’s more to the show than sensational hand-wringing about kids today."

=== Ratings ===
On linear television, the first season of Euphoria has an average of 560,000 US viewers per episode. During the first ninety days, season 1 averaged 6,600,000 viewers across all platforms (HBO Max and the discontinued HBO Go and HBO Now).

=== Accolades ===
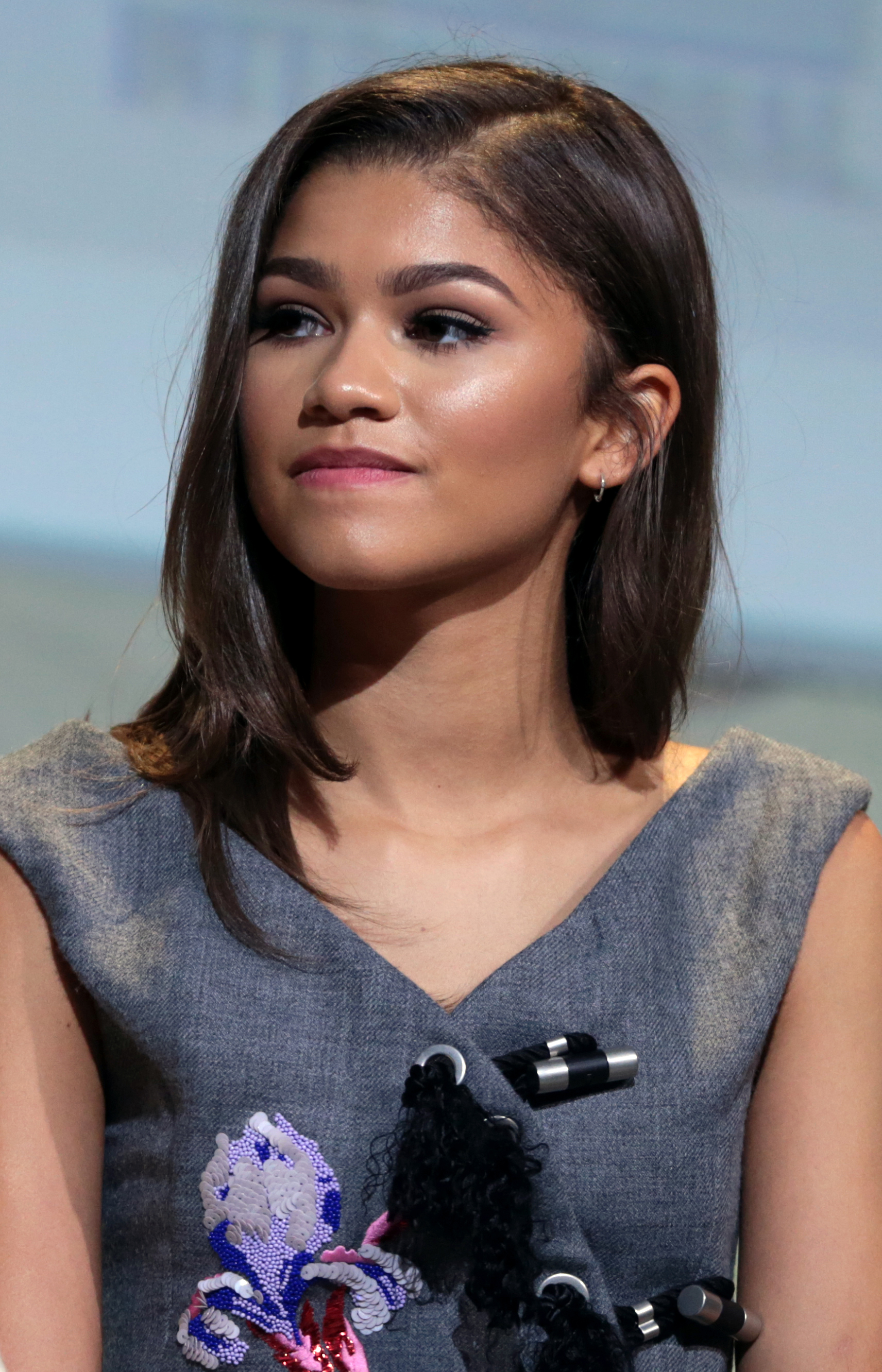
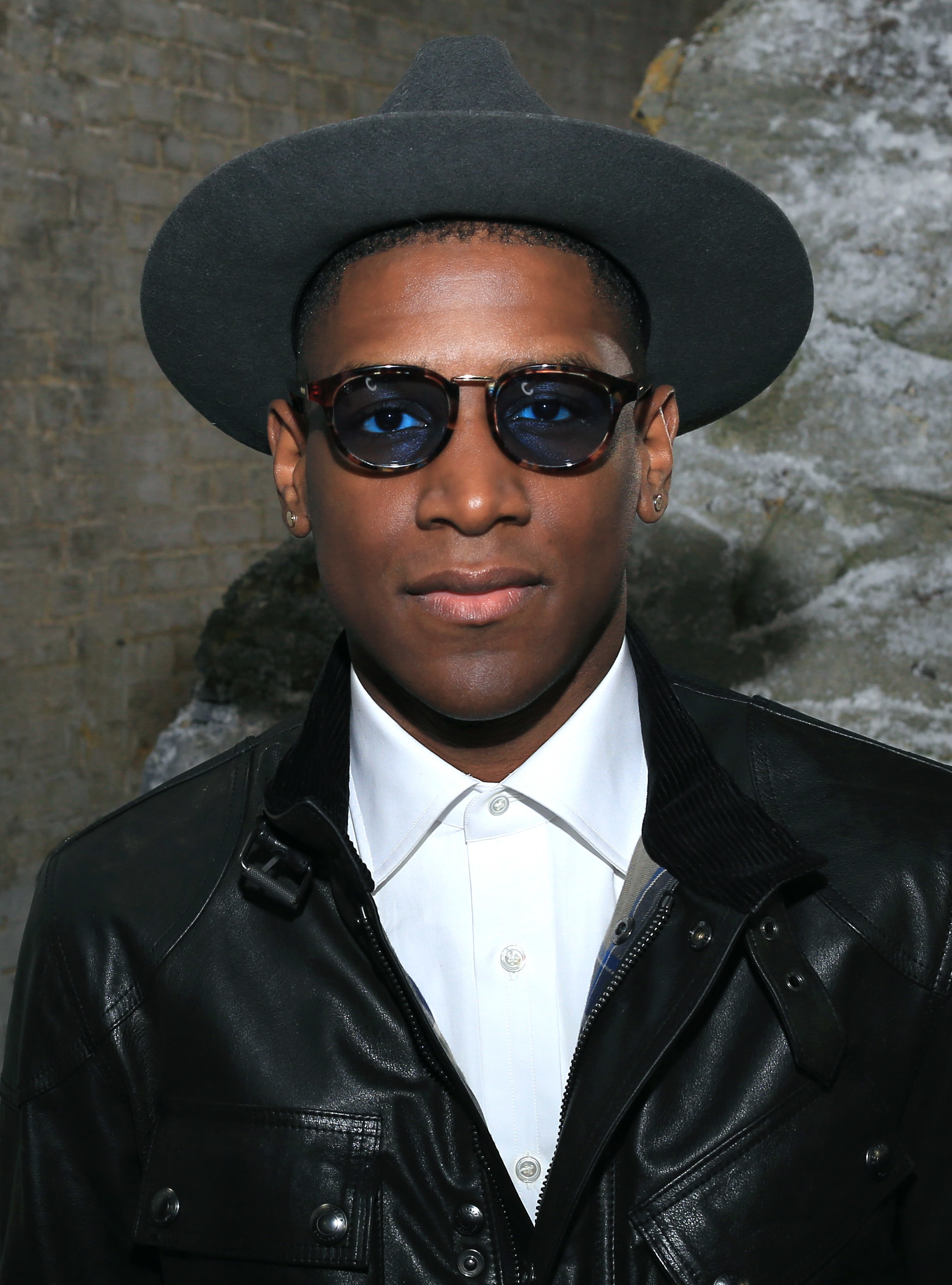
Zendaya and Labrinth both won Primetime Emmy Awards for season 1.

The first season of Euphoria was nominated for six Primetime Emmy Awards. At the 72nd Primetime Emmy Awards, the season received one nomination; Zendaya's turn in episode three "Made You Look" won her Outstanding Lead Actress in a Drama Series. At the 72nd Primetime Creative Arts Emmy Awards, the season was nominated for Outstanding Music Composition for a Series (Original Dramatic Score) (Labrinth for "'03 Bonnie and Clyde"), Outstanding Contemporary Costumes (Heidi Bivens, Danielle Baker and Katina Danabassis for "The Next Episode"), and Outstanding Music Supervision (Adam Leber and Jen Malone for episode eight, "And Salt the Earth Behind You"). At the ceremony, the season also won two awards, both for the finale: Doniella Davy, Kirsten Sage Coleman and Tara Lang Shah's cosmetics won Outstanding Makeup for a Single-Camera Series (Non-Prosthetic), and the version of his song "All for Us" won Labrinth Outstanding Original Music and Lyrics.
