= Shook Ones Pt. II (Euphoria) =

- Euphoria episode
- Jules Vaughn and Nate Jacobs by the lake.
- Episode no.: Season 1 Episode 4
- Directed by: Sam Levinson
- Written by: Sam Levinson
- Cinematography by: Marcell Rév
- Editing by: Julio C. Perez IV
- Original air date: July 7, 2019
- Running time: 55 minutes

Guest appearances
- Austin Abrams as Ethan Daley; Keean Johnson as Daniel Dimarco; Colman Domingo as Ali Muhamand; Paula Marshall as Marsha Jacobs; John Ales as David Vaughn; Zak Steiner as Aaron Jacobs; Pell James as Amy Vaughn; Clark Furlong as Jules Vaughn (11); Will Peltz as Luke Kasten

Episode chronology
← Previous "Made You Look"	Next → "'03 Bonnie and Clyde"
- Euphoria season 1

"Shook Ones Pt. II" is the fourth episode of the first season of the American teen drama television series Euphoria. The episode was written and directed by series creator Sam Levinson. It originally aired on HBO on July 7, 2019 and received widespread critical acclaim. The title of this episode is a reference to the 1995 song of the same name by American hip-hop duo Mobb Deep.

The episode's cold open introduces Jules Vaughn (Hunter Schafer) being involuntary committed to a psychiatric hospital by her mother as a child before starting to have casual sex with older men as a teenager and falling in love with Rue Bennett (Zendaya) and Nate Jacobs's (Jacob Elordi) online persona "Tyler". In the episode proper, a traveling carnival arrives in town and Jules' discovers "Tyler" is Nate.

== Plot ==
As a child, Jules Vaughn (Hunter Schafer) is involuntarily committed into staying at a psychiatric hospital by her mother Amy (Pell James). Jules develops gender dysphoria, and finds solace in self-harm. As a teenager, her parents divorce and she begins to medically transition, taking part in numerous instances of casual sex with older men. Jules eventually moves to East Highland with her supportive father David (John Ales) and befriends Rue Bennett (Zendaya), while also falling in love with "ShyGuy118".

In the present, Ali Muhamand (Colman Domingo) compares Rue's obsession with Jules to addiction. Several days later, a traveling carnival arrives in East Highland, where Nate Jacobs (Jacob Elordi) ridicules Maddy Perez's (Alexa Demie) provocative outfit. Jules tells Rue things aren't weird despite their kiss. Cassie Howard (Sydney Sweeney) storms away from Chris McKay (Algee Smith) when he refuses to acknowledge her as his girlfriend. Sick of their boyfriends, Maddy and Cassie do MDMA.

Kat Hernandez (Barbie Ferreira) misreads a conversation between Ethan Daley (Austin Abrams) and Becky (Elizabeth Posey) and leaves in fury to hook up with infamous former student Luke Kasten (Will Peltz). Jules recognises Cal (Eric Dane) as the man she slept with. Incredulous, Rue explains he is Nate's father and a powerful figure in East Highland. Jules proves she's not lying by approaching Cal's chili con carne stand, visibly startling him.

Rue's mother Leslie (Nika King) calls to say her little sister Gia (Storm Reid) isn't answering the phone. Rue and Jules rush around the crowded carnival to try and find Gia. Fireworks illuminate the sky while Cassie loudly and publicly orgasms on the carousel. Meanwhile, Nate angrily chokes Maddy after she makes a scene at his family's chili stand, leading to a confrontation over dick pics on his smartphone. Rue eventually finds Gia smoking cannabis with McKay's twin brothers, while Cal approaches Jules and pleads with her not to ruin his life. Bewildered, Jules states that she had no intention to do so, much to his relief.

While Rue and Gia head home together, Jules meets up with "Tyler" for the first time, where Nate reveals himself. Nate blackmails Jules with the nudes she sent him; if she exposes his father's affairs, he will report her for child pornography distribution and get her registered as a sex offender. In defiance, Jules calls Nate and his father a faggot. Nate departs, leaving Jules both heartbroken and afraid. Distraught, Jules goes to Rue's house, telling her the meet up went awry but not elaborating. In bed, the two embrace and Jules kisses Rue.

== Production ==
=== Writing ===
"Shook Ones, Part II" from the 1995 Mob Deep album The Infamous is the origin of the episode's title. 'Shook ones' in the context of the song refers to individuals who may seem tough and resilient on the outside, but are quick to crumble. This meaning is a parallel to several interactions in the episode: Cal emits hypermasculinity but becomes flushed and panicked interacting with Jules, McKay cannot admit his relationship with Cassie publicly, Maddy is initially amused insulting the Jacobs but is assaulted by Nate in retaliation, Jules taunts Nate's father's sexuality but is left devastated and crying alone, Nate in turn hides his feelings for Jules and Kat enjoys her power over men but is left hurt after mistakenly believing that Ethan was flirting. Jules' actress Schafer spoke about her character's writing in an behind-the-scenes video uploaded to Euphoria's YouTube channel, "these were like the first full scripts I ever read. They were really exciting, and like fun to read. The fact that labels are sort left out of the story is one of my favorite elements." She also spoke about her scene with Nate, "Tyler is sort of the ideal, like, boy for Jules. To have that in one moment be crushed and seeing Nate's face, that is heartbreak for her. There is a moment of wavering because Nate's still speaking like Tyler to her. Maybe he really is Tyler. Maybe this could work."

=== Filming ===
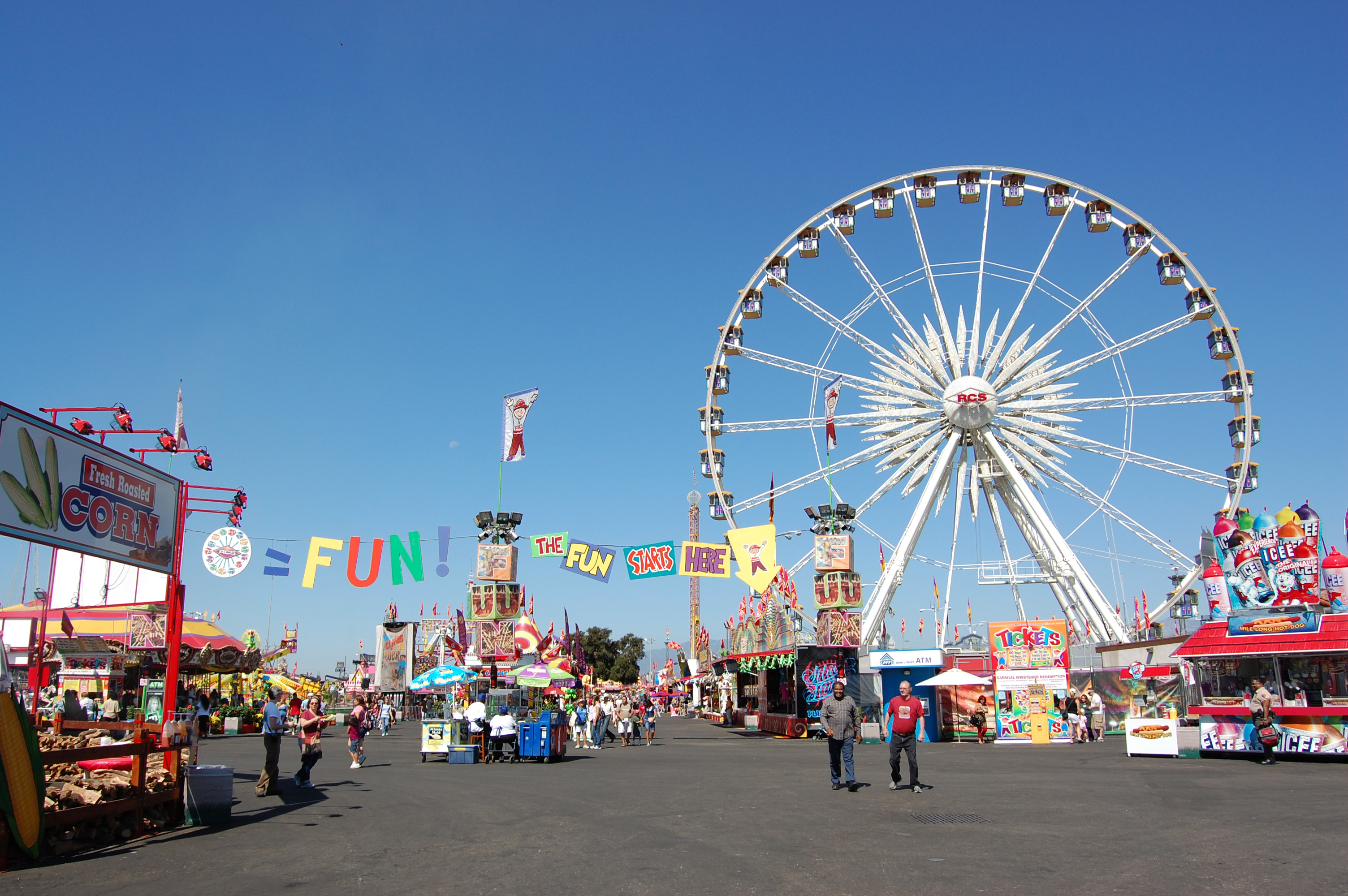
Production built the fair for the episode just two days before shooting started.

Location shooting for the diner where Rue and Ali meet near the beginning of the episode was filmed at Pann's Restaurant in Westchester, Los Angeles. The majority of the episode takes place at carnival, which was built from scratch using rented amusement rides and equipment, just two days before shooting began. Director and writer Sam Levinson said "when you're young and it's like, the carnival's in town, it's always this major event". Cinematographer Marcell Rév added that "Sam had the idea to create a setting that can be dreamy but based in reality". Levinson worked with storyboard artist Peter Beck to create a "carnival that didn't exist." He concluded "it was a massive thing to coordinate. [...] it was kind of conceived as an oblong-esque carnival in which we're able to continually track through it. [...] We could utilize our extras in a way that gave it sort of real scope."

A ten-minute tracking shot introduces where the characters are in the carnival. It starts with Angus Cloud's Fezco O'Neill and Javon Walton's Ashtray setting up their drug shop disguised as a pretzel stall, then moves to Rue, then Maddy, then Kat and Jules screaming on a ferris wheel, Nate telling Maddy to go home and get changed, before camera swings wildly across to Rue and Jules, who lock eyes. The scene was achieved with a camera dolly, technocrane, and four invisible cuts. Rév spoke to Deadline Hollywood on the day of the episode's broadcast about "cultivating emotional realism" in the "passing the visual baton" scene, saying that it was "to introduce a space where all characters were present, and somehow connect them in one shot". The final sequence is a horizontally rotating shot around Rue and Jules in bed that also depicts them at various previous moments. To allow the Arri Alexa rig to rotate around the bed, the set was built upright with Schafer and Zendaya standing. They were made to appear lying down via forced perspective.

=== Music ===
The entirety of Anohni's song "In My Dreams" plays from when Cal notices his sex tape with Jules is missing to when Nate kisses Jules. "Laura's Theme" from the Pino Donaggio's score of the thriller film Don't Look Now (1973) was used over the final scene of Jules and Rue and the closing credits. Its inclusion in the episode achieved Donaggio's score newfound recognition. One of Euphoria's music supervisors Jen Malone noted that the cues used were the most difficult to obtain out of all of the music used in season 1.

== Reception ==
=== Ratings ===
Viewership and ratings per episode of Shook Ones Pt. II
No.	Title	Air date	Rating/share (18–49)	Viewers (millions)	DVR (18–49)	DVR viewers (millions)	Total (18–49)	Total viewers (millions)
4	"Shook Ones Pt. II"	July 7, 2019	0.21	0.609	0.10	0.218	0.31	0.827

Including stats from streaming service HBO Max, the episode drew 2,112,000 viewers on its first day of release.

=== Critical reviews ===
"Shook Ones Pt. II" received highly positive reviews from critics. The review aggregator website Metacritic, which uses a weighted average, assigned a score of 90 out of 100, based on five user ratings. In a ranking of the first two seasons and specials, BuzzFeed concluded that "Shook Ones Pt. II" was the best of the series, writing: "As with others on the list, it's a whole-cast-at-a-party episode with every character bringing their hottest, most confident, bad bitch version of themselves to the fairgrounds. [...] This episode also happens to be the Jules flashback episode, and with her as the central character for much of season 1, this episode reveals so much about her and her motives. The horror she feels when she realizes that Nate has been catfishing her at the end of the episode is palpable, and her return to Rue is somehow both everything we hoped for and incredibly depressing." IndieWire placed it in fourth in a list which included season three's premiere "Ándale", writing that "the infamous carnival episode is chock-full of iconic Euphoria moments, but the script never gets better than Rue and Jules screaming, 'HE DROPPED THE CHILI!' In addition to bringing two of the show’s most precarious plotlines into spectacularly cathartic collision, "Shook Ones Pt. II" reframes the teen archetypes of East Highland as remarkably young victims of some tremendously dark shit. Whether it’s Cal outing himself as a predator via prize-winning stew, or Maddy and Cassie riding the relatable pain of young love into a brick wall of toxic masculinity and public shaming, this is Euphoria at its most serially compelling — a tipping point from when it felt like Levinson really knew what he was doing."

Screen Rant's Ben Sherlock was highly approving of the episode, writing "Euphoria was a singular vision from the very beginning, but it wasn’t until season 1, episode 4, “Shook Ones Pt. II,” that the series became a modern classic." In a three out of five star review for Vulture, Allie Pape wrote that "in the classic ’90s hip-hop track for which this episode is named, Mobb Deep opined that “there’s no such thing as halfway crooks.” That’s clearly meant as a bit of side-eye from Euphoria to its junior miscreants, who think their bad behavior won’t catch up with them. But it’s also a criticism easily leveled at the show itself, which is the definition of a halfway crook. Is Euphoria a thoughtful, necessarily lurid meditation on the Way We Teen Now, or is it high-budget Riverdale with actual booze and drugs? It’s hard to say after this episode, which plays at offering the former and then mostly delivers the latter." Black Nerd Problems' Aisha Jordan praised Rue and Jules' relationship writing "it’s just this was a masterful episode, a true masterpiece. They wanted a rollercoaster, and I felt every dip and climb – I am so stuck on these two." Ariana Romero of Refinery29 praised Nate and Jules' scene writing "the final scene of the episode, which brings Jules face-to-face with "Tyler", the boy she has fallen for over the last three episodes. "Tyler" is, as we viewers have always known, actually Nate (Jacob Elordi, towering over everyone this week), the person who threatened to kill Jules the moment he met her. The results are one of the most jarringly upsetting scenes you’ll see all year." Romero also expressed that the episode felt "optimistic", explaining that "although the show can often feel like a bleak drive through the darkest parts of teen life, a trip to the carnival gives Euphoria some true messy excitement."
