= Made You Look (Euphoria) =

- Euphoria episode
- Rue Bennett kisses Jules Vaughn.
- Episode no.: Season 1 Episode 3
- Directed by: Sam Levinson
- Written by: Sam Levinson
- Cinematography by: Marcell Rév
- Editing by: Julio C. Perez IV; Laura Zempel
- Original air date: June 30, 2019
- Running time: 56 minutes

Guest appearances
- Alanna Ubach as Suze Howard; Austin Abrams as Ethan Daley; Keean Johnson as Daniel Dimarco; Colman Domingo as Ali Muhamand; Mercedes Colon as Kat's Mom; John Ales as David Vaughn; Shiloh Fernandez as Trevor

Episode chronology
← Previous "Stuntin' Like My Daddy"	Next → "Shook Ones Pt. II"
- Euphoria season 1

"Made You Look" is the third episode of the first season of the American teen drama television series Euphoria. The episode was written and directed by series creator Sam Levinson. It originally aired on HBO on June 30, 2019. The title of this episode is a reference to the 2002 song of the same name by American rapper Nas.

The episode's cold open introduces Kat Hernandez's (Barbie Ferreira) childhood weight gain, loss of her boyfriend Daniel Dimarco (Keean Johnson), her rise in the world of online fan fiction and career as a webcam model. In the episode proper, Rue Bennett (Zendaya) lies to her Narcotics Anonymous group, while her girlfriend Jules Vaughn (Hunter Schafer) is catfished by Nate Jacobs (Jacob Elordi).

"Made You Look" received largely positive reviews. Out of the six Primetime Emmy Award nominations received by the show for its first season, one was specifically for this episode, Outstanding Lead Actress in a Drama Series for Zendaya's performance, which she won.

== Plot ==
In middle school, Kat Hernandez (Barbie Ferreira) suddenly gains weight during a family trip to Jamaica. Once her middle school boyfriend Daniel Dimarco (Keean Johnson) discovers this, he breaks up with her. As a teenager, she anonymously creates erotic fan fiction on Tumblr, inventing the conspiracy theory of Larry Stylinson. In the present, now famous online for both her slash fiction and her leaked sex tape, Kat decides to become a webcam model.

Jules Vaughn (Hunter Schafer) and Nate Jacobs (Jacob Elordi) fall in love with each other over text conversations, although she believes he is a boy called "Tyler" who uses the alias ShyGuy118. Rue Bennett (Zendaya), conflicted over her feelings towards Jules, is skeptical of the relationship, but still offers to help Jules take nudes for "Tyler". Later, Rue steals oxycodone from Jules' house before going to a Narcotics Anonymous meeting high and pretending to have been sober for longer than she really has. Afterwards, Muslim recovering addict Ali Muhamand (Colman Domingo) confronts Rue, revealing that he knows she is lying.

Kat receives a message from a Pornhub user, Johnny_Unite_USA (Jeff Pope), who offers to pay Kat in exchange for her sending him a foot fetish video. Unsure of how bitcoin payment from Johnny works, Kat asks Fezco O'Neill (Angus Cloud) and Ashtray (Javon Walton) for advice. Kat then has her first Skype session with Johnny and learns he has small penis humiliation and financial domination kinks.

Meanwhile, Chris McKay (Algee Smith) brings his girlfriend Cassie Howard (Sydney Sweeney) to a fraternity party at his college, while Maddy Perez (Alexa Demie) becomes suspicious of Nate's constant texts; she checks Nate's phone and comes across an abundance of pictures of other men's penises, used to catfish Jules. Maddy confides about Nate to Kat, who erotically fantasizes about having sex with store clerk Trevor (Shiloh Fernandez). With newfound confidence, Kat dons a new appearance, shocking her friend Ethan Daley (Austin Abrams).

Rue disapproves of Jules' plan to meet up with "Tyler", causing tension between the two. Rue begins to spiral and visits Jules to have a tearful heart-to-heart conversation, which ends with Rue leaning forward and kissing her before running away in shock. Unable to deal with her feelings, Rue heads to Fezco's for drugs, but he refuses to give her any. She curses him and tearfully blames him for her addiction. After failing to get what she wants, Rue calls Ali and takes up his earlier offer to meet.

== Production ==
=== Writing ===
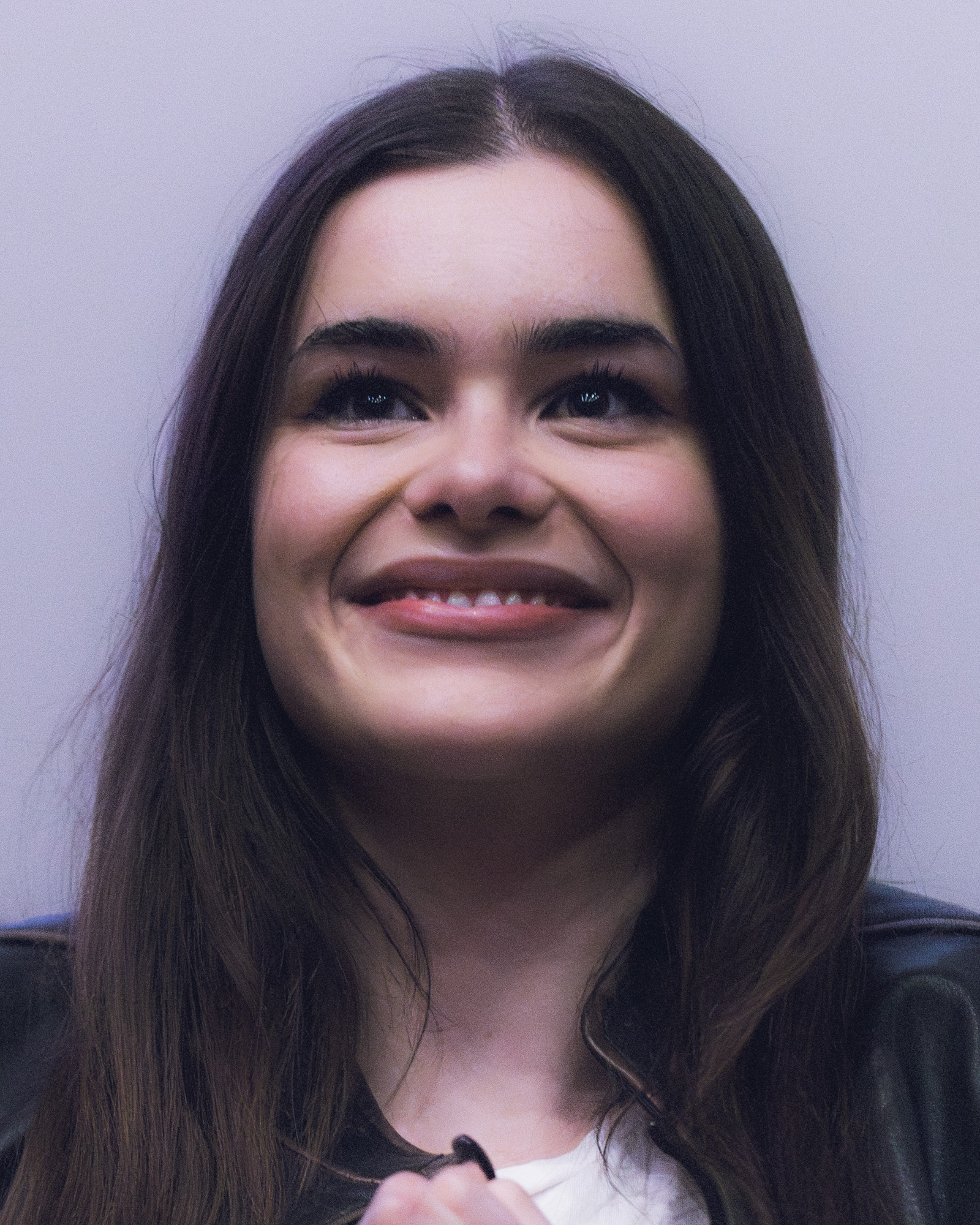
Barbie Ferreira stars in the episode.

"Made You Look" from the 2002 Nas album God's Son is the origin of the episode's title. This name was chosen to parallel Kat's attention seeking behavior. In the opening of the episode, Kat is depicted writing fan fiction of Killian Jones and Emma Swan (Jennifer Morrison) from Once Upon a Time. Morrison went on to direct episode five "'03 Bonnie and Clyde". Speaking to the Los Angeles Times, Levinson discussed his process in writing Kat's story arc, explaining: "What was interesting was the idea that Kat had a life online in which she was very popular, and a life in school and with her friends in which she wasn't. [...] Something that I thought was a fascinating or exciting idea was to take this burgeoning curiosity about sexuality that's ultimately framed through the lens of fan fiction and allow it to come to life."

=== Filming ===
In an behind-the-scenes video uploaded to Euphoria's YouTube channel, Ferreira spoke about creating her character: "It was very much based of, you know, me as a teen. I think Kat is searching for self-validation." She added that "most people have body insecurities, no matter what you look like, no matter what size you are. It's just the way that media has been ingrained in us, is that we all want to fix ourselves, whether we're broken or not." Levinson commended Ferreira's portrayal as Kat and revealed that Ferreira was inspired by Thora Birch: "[Ferreira] had such a sense of self-confidence [and] there was a certain nervousness about how she was going to play the earlier version of Kat. It was only when she came in with a photo of Thora Birch from [Ghost World] and said "What do you think about this haircut?" [...] She cut her hair, and she became the character."

=== Music ===
Executive producer Drake had his song "Nonstop" play over multiple scenes of Kat's web-camming. During the split screen sequence of Nate and Jules text conversations, Charlotte Day Wilson's song "Work" plays. While Rue is shown giving a presentation on the etiquette of dick pics, "Smooth Up In Ya" by BulletBoys starts on cue with a slide projector. "Champagne Coast" by Blood Orange and "Taking Responsibility" by Kilo Kish play when she takes nudes of Jules and cycles to a church. DMX's song "X Gon' Give It To Ya" plays over a montage of Kat's transformation in style.

== Reception ==
=== Ratings ===
Viewership and ratings per episode of Made You Look
No.	Title	Air date	Rating/share (18–49)	Viewers (millions)	DVR (18–49)	DVR viewers (millions)	Total (18–49)	Total viewers (millions)
3	"Made You Look"	June 30, 2019	0.19	0.493	0.08	0.209	0.29	0.774

=== Critical reviews ===
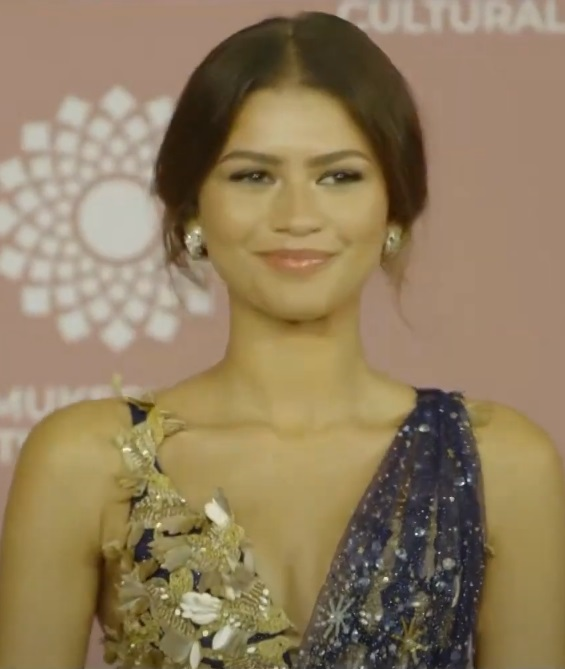
"Made You Look" won Zendaya a Primetime Emmy Award.

"Made You Look" received highly positive reviews from critics. The review aggregator website Metacritic, which uses a weighted average, assigned a score of 78 out of 100, based on four user ratings. TVLine named Zendaya their "Performer of the Week" on July 6, 2019 for her work in this episode. The site wrote "We know this is a weird request to make in this space, especially but we'd be OK with it if Zendaya were a little less good at her job: She plays Euphoria's Rue, a grieving teen who self-medicates to get through the day, with an honesty and rawness that makes us ache. Add that to the artful way in which she brings the usual teenage travails to vivid life, and we're (pardon the pun) hooked on her portrayal."

In a ranking of the first two seasons and specials, BuzzFeed listed "Made You Look" at eleven out of eighteen, writing: "This episode is a fizzy, dishy burst of wonder, and the fact that it doesn't even crack the top 10 is a testament to just how good Euphoria can be." IndieWire placed it at the same number in a list which included season three's premiere "Ándale", writing: "East Highland snaps into full focus as a street-smart teen underworld that’s inherently confrontational." Allie Pape at Vulture gave the episode a 5 out of 5, commending the episode's comedic sequences and praising the performances of Zendaya and Ferreira. Pape also praised the show's handling of Kat's character, writing that Kat is "arguably the show's best at bringing nuance to a complicated social issue [...] Euphoria is crystal clear that the biggest source of Kat's insecurity is media consumption, which fills her with unrealistic expectations for romance and for her body". Aisha Jordan at Black Nerd Problems spoke favourably of the episode's final scene, commending Zendaya's portrayal as Rue. Ariana Romero of Refinery29 also spoke highly of Zendaya's performance, writing: "[It] is some of Zendaya's best acting to date. She oscillates between pointed anger and pure shock before finally crumbling into a teary mess [...] It's the kind of performance that goes into someone's Emmy reel".

The episode's depiction of Kat inventing the real person fiction of Harry Styles and Louis Tomlinson and the subsequent anime sex scene between fictional versions of the musicians was met with criticism from some viewers. For his part, Tomlinson responded on Twitter: "I can categorically say that I was not contacted nor did I approve it."

=== Accolades ===
The episode was Zendaya's submission at the 72nd Primetime Emmy Awards, leading her to win the Primetime Emmy Award for Outstanding Lead Actress in a Drama Series. In her acceptance speech, given at the height of the COVID-19 pandemic, Zendaya sent a message of hope, "I know this feels like a really weird time to be celebrating. But I just want to say there is hope in the young people out there - I know that our TV show doesn't always feel like a great example of that - but there is hope in our young people and I just want to say to all my peers out there doing the work in the streets, 'I see you, I admire you, I thank you."
