= Euphoria: Season 3 (HBO Original Series Soundtrack) =

2026 film soundtrack album

Soundtrack album by Hans Zimmer
- Released: May 29, 2026
- Length: 66:21
- Label: Milan
- Producer: Hans Zimmer

Hans Zimmer chronology
Ella McCay (2026)	Euphoria: Season 3 (HBO Original Series Soundtrack) (2026)	Lion (2026)

Euphoria chronology
Euphoria Season 2 Official Score (From the HBO Original Series) (2022)	Euphoria: Season 3 (HBO Original Series Soundtrack) (2026)

Euphoria: Season 3 (HBO Original Series Soundtrack) is the soundtrack album to the third season of the HBO teen drama television series Euphoria. This season featured original score composed by Hans Zimmer, whose contribution consisted of 24 tracks in the album. Labrinth, who had been a part of the previous two seasons, left the project in March 2026, despite his initial involvement. The score was released through Milan Records on May 29, 2026.

== Background ==
Recurring composer Labrinth who scored the previous seasons of Euphoria returned for the third season. In July 2025, the makers announced that Hans Zimmer would join the third season as a co-composer alongside Labrinth. Showrunner Sam Levinson noted that "each character’s storyline is like its own film in a way" and since the main characters move out of high school, Levinson was least interested in focusing on the pop and needle drop roots that became the core of the previous seasons, and instead focus on the characters in "these landscapes, dealing with good and evil, the choices [they] make, the consequences, and the freedom of being older" and visualizing that, which led him to approach with a "old-fashioned Hollywood western score".

While writing the third season, Levinson played two Hans Zimmer's scores: Interstellar (2014) and True Romance (1993), where the former had a sense of wonder and underlying religious quality and latter had a Americana musical aesthetic and time-travel quality, and a sense of Romanticism and optimism gravitated him. When he sent the script to Zimmer, he noticed the poster of Once Upon a Time in the West (1968) which had one of Levinson's favorite scores, and he referenced that to Zimmer needing his envisioning of a Western score inspired by that, which led Zimmer excited.

Levinson noted that with most modern scores are minimilastic, he wanted a grand score that pushes the emotions and reflect the characters' dreams, anxieties and wishes. He added that "the depth of Hans [Zimmer]' work is pretty shocking" referencing that the stems which Zimmer sent had instruments which he never heard of, further complimenting it as to be his thrilling collaborations in his career.

=== Labrinth's exit ===
In March 2026, Labrinth released a strongly worded personal statement on his social media account claiming he was "done with this [music] industry" and further called out the creators of the series as well as Columbia Records, who represented Labrinth. The following month, he further elaborated on his departure from Euphoria and confirmed that his music has been removed from the third season. Zimmer, thereby received the sole credit as the composer. When asked about Labrinth's exit, Levinson, however refused to comment.

== Release ==
The soundtrack was released through Milan Records on May 29, 2026.

== Reception ==
Hans Zimmer's music divided the fans of the show who were critical on how his involvement affected the season musically and took a different direction. This was evident, with the third episode "The Ballad of Paladin" where most felt Zimmer's music being out of place of the sonic world that had been developed in the earlier seasons. Writing for The Fader, Tobias Hess noted that, "Hans Zimmer's score, like the rest of the show, feels empty, referential and at times gratuitous." Music supervisor Kier Lehman also expressed his thoughts on Zimmer's replacement of Labrinth adding that "part of what makes a show really special is having that unique sound that is something that people associate only with that show" reinstating on how Labrinth's music helped Euphoria being a popular show, and having a fandom, while further briefing that the sudden change of the musical tone jarred the audiences.

However, James Southall of Movie Wave was defensive on Zimmer's involvement in the album review, adding that "Hans Zimmer continues to divide opinion after all these years (it is fair to say that longstanding Euphoria fans were not all delighted at the shift in musical direction for this season) but whatever you think of his music, at his heart he really is an old-fashioned showman. When he’s really on fire and inspired by something the results can be great and Euphoria Season Three is great. To bring together all these disparate elements, all these inspirations, and turn them into such a cohesive album experience must have really taken some doing – the entertainment that results is a complete joy."

== Track listing ==
No.	Title	Length
1.	"Agua Dulce"	1:12
2.	"Ten Percent"	1:39
3.	"The Long Road"	1:32
4.	"Whole Fucking Endeavor"	1:34
5.	"Toxic Masculinity"	4:36
6.	"Aperol Spritz"	1:57
7.	"Keep Me Company"	2:06
8.	"Window of Opportunity"	3:34
9.	"Dress Sexy"	2:01
10.	"Just the Facts"	1:46
11.	"Opportunity"	2:44
12.	"Keep You Forever"	2:43
13.	"Rue Romance"	8:48
14.	"Follow Her Dreams"	2:36
15.	"Unleashed"	4:04
16.	"Showtime"	2:55
17.	"It's Just Me Cassie"	1:38
18.	"Joshua Tree"	2:51
19.	"Uncoupled"	1:05
20.	"Limerence"	2:01
21.	"Hurry Your Ass Up and Run!"	2:55
22.	"Man of Principle"	3:43
23.	"Jerusalem Rd"	6:21
Total length:		66:21
