= Jules Vaughn =

Fictional character from Euphoria

- Euphoria character
- Hunter Schafer as Jules Vaughn
- First appearance: "Pilot"; Euphoria; June 16, 2019
- Last appearance: "In God We Trust"; May 31, 2026
- Created by: Sam Levinson
- Portrayed by: Hunter Schafer; Clark Furlong (child)

In-universe information
- Full name: Jules Vaughn
- Nickname: Jewel (by Fezco O'Neill)
- Occupation: Student; Painter; Sugar baby
- Family: David Vaughn (father); Amy Vaughn (mother)
- Significant others: Cal Jacobs (hook up); Rue Bennett (on-and-off girlfriend); Nate Jacobs (catfished as "Tyler"); Anna (fling); Elliot (hook up); Ellis (boyfriend)
- Nationality: American
- Date of birth: c. 2001

Jules Vaughn is a fictional character in the American television drama series Euphoria on HBO. Part of the main cast for all three seasons and the specials, Jules is depicted as a transgender junior in high school who moves from Los Angeles to the fictional suburb East Highland. As a young adult she drops out of art school when she starts sugar dating.

Jules is portrayed by Hunter Schafer as an eclectic, free-spirited, chaotic but kind girl next door. Euphoria's lead Rue Bennett (Zendaya) uses Jules as a replacement for her opiate addiction, causing strain in their romance. Since before the show's beginning Jules used the app Scruff to have casual sex with usually older men. This trait is exploited by Nate Jacobs (Jacob Elordi) to catfish her, extract nudes for blackmail and stop her revealing her hook up with his closeted father. Once in senior year, she cheats on Rue with Elliot (Dominic Fike), who informs her of the former's relapse. Jules relays this to Rue's mother, causing a violent breakup. Despite this they rekindle the relationship in their early twenties, but Rue dies of a drug overdose.

Schafer worked with showrunner Sam Levinson to make sure Jules' transgender life was accurate. This includes co-writing "Fuck Anyone Who's Not a Sea Blob", an episode which focused on Jules in therapy describing her experiences in womanhood. Her role as one of the few transgender youth represented positively in mass media has garnered critical acclaim. The character was praised by Vulture for not being a victim of violence like most trans women on screen. At the time of season 1, transsexual people on television were rare (GLAAD found only seventeen in the two years preceding), as were trans actors playing them. Jules has thus been noted as a turning point in media portrayals of transgender people and transgender characters in television.

== Development ==
=== Casting ===
In 2018, nineteen-year-old working model Hunter Schafer responded to an Instagram casting call for the television pilot of a new HBO series. It required no previous acting experience and asked for transgender girls. Elite Model Management, Schafer's agency, informed her she received the audition a few days later and she joined Euphoria. In Los Angeles, Schafer did her final screen test, filmed the first episode in March and moved to the city in October to film the first season.

=== Writing ===
Euphoria's creator, writer, main director and showrunner Sam Levinson worked alongside Schafer during the teleplay writing process. Speaking to Variety in 2019, Schafer said that “All the complications that come with being trans and queer simultaneously, as far as that being something the public is going to see: That’s really exciting to me, because that story will be accessible. But what’s also exciting is that it’s not about that at all.” In 2021, Schafer became the only credited writer of Euphoria other than Levinson when she co-wrote the second of two Euphoria specials. "Fuck Anyone Who's Not a Sea Blob" shows Jules' perspective through the frame story of a psychotherapy session.

== Background ==
Stemming from gender dysphoria in childhood, Jules dealt with bouts of depression, anxiety, and self-harm. Eventually this led her mother Amy Vaughn (Pell James) to take her against her will to a psychiatric hospital. Her father David Vaughn (John Ales) quit his job as Amy descended into substance use disorder; destroying an already antagonistic mother-daughter bond.

Starting estradiol at thirteen began Jules' gender transition. Using online dating application Scruff beginning at sixteen, she had casual sex with a rotating set of cisgender, white, heterosexual men usually cheating on their girlfriends/wives. After her parents divorced, she moved with her father from Los Angeles to East Highland.

== Appearances ==
=== Season 1 (2019) ===
After Jules is catcalled by Nate Jacobs (Jacob Elordi), she finds solace in her summer school friend Kat Hernandez (Barbie Ferreira), who invites her to Chris McKay's (Algee Smith) party. Jules cancels to hook up with Nates' father Cal Jacobs (Eric Dane). Afterwards she is threatened by Nate at the party, until she cuts herself and smears blood on him. She introduces herself to her fellow teens, including Rue Bennett (Zendaya). Rue and Jules spend the night together in Jules' bedroom.

Rue and Jules grow closer as their junior year at East Highland High School begins. She also meet and starts romantically texting a boy her age who uses the internet pseudonym "ShyGuy118". After Rue takes fentanyl, Jules helps drug dealer Fezco O'Neill (Angus Cloud) save her life and allows her to recover at her house. "ShyGuy118" tells Jules over text that his name is "Tyler". Unbeknownst to Jules, this boy is really Nate, stealing the name of Tyler Clarkson (Lukas Gage) a man he terrorized for having sex with his girlfriend Maddy Perez (Alexa Demie).

Via text conversations Jules continues to fall in love with "Tyler", while Rue falls for her in real life. Together the girls review a fake dick pic Nate sends Jules and decide to create nudes of Jules for him, with Rue as a photographer. Conflicted over her feelings about Jules, Rue steals opiates from her to fuel her addiction. After an argument over meeting "Tyler" at an upcoming traveling carnival, the two girls have a heart to heart, ending with Rue giving Jules an unexpected kiss before running away in shock.

Ali Muhammad (Colman Domingo), Rue's mentor compares her obsession with Jules to a drug addiction. At the carnival, Jules assures Rue their kiss was not weird. Jules recognizes Cal as the man she slept with and proves it to Rue. After helping find Rue's little sister Gia Bennett (Storm Reid), Jules tells Cal she has no intention to ruin his life. Jules meets up with "Tyler" and discovers he is Nate. Nate blackmails her, threatening to report her nudes as child pornography unless she keeps quiet about her relationship with his father. Jules goes to Rue's house and they kiss passionately.

Missing drugs, Rue decides to focus obsessively on Jules. Rue tells her mother that she is dating Jules. Jules asks Rue to stay quiet about her hookup with Cal. Rue asks Jules if Nate knows and warns of the danger of her situation. Jules' father asks her if she has something with Rue. Lexi Howard (Maude Apatow) comments on Rue's vast improvement since meeting Jules, causing her to worry that Rue's sobriety relies on her. Rue falls asleep on a terrified Jules.

Nate continues his crusade to besmirch Jules' reputation by printing out topless photos of her, to force her to give a false confession to the police. Attending a Halloween party, Rue feels left out as the only sober one, sensing that something is off with Jules. Dressed as Claire Danes' in Romeo + Juliet (1996), an intoxicated Jules stumbles outside and falls in the swimming pool, prompting Rue to rescue her. Jules drunkenly spouts out lines from Romeo and Juliet.

Visiting Los Angeles, Jules' old friend TC (Bobbi Salvör Menuez) introduces Jules' to her roommate Anna (Quintessa Swindell) and the two put on makeup together. The three of them eventually decide to go clubbing and take psychedelics. Jules debates texting Rue before kissing Anna in the club. Nate, clad in shimmering makeup, arrives at the club and apologizes to Jules for everything. However, as the two begin kissing, it's evident that Jules is simply hallucinating him in the place of Anna, and the two engage in oral sex. Jules texts Rue, telling her that she missed her.

Rue and Jules reconcile in the hospital. Nate tells Rue she does not know everything about Jules. This inevitably prompts Rue and Jules to talk. Jules admits she loves both Anna and Rue before they decide to leave East Highland together. Rue and Jules tell each other how they really feel. At the train station, before Jules and Rue leave, Rue has second thoughts and backs out at the last minute. She says her goodbyes and watches as Jules leaves alone on the train.

=== Specials (2020–2021) ===
Over Christmas, Jules has her first psychotherapy appointment with Dr. Mardy Nichols (Lauren Weedman) in which she reflects and retells her time in East Highland. At first, Jules announces she wants to go off her hormones, or at least remove her puberty blocker implant. During the events of the first season, Amy was recovering from addiction, but was hospitalized as the result of a relapse due to overhearing Jules admit she cannot forgive her for abandoning her as a child. Mardy observes that Jules's complicated feelings about Rue closely resemble those she has about her mother. Over the course of the session she also reveals her conflicted feelings about "Tyler", Nate's online persona during their intimate texting, admitting that she still loves him despite what he had done, and is uncertain if that will change.

=== Season 2 (2022) ===
On New Year's Eve, Jules attends a house party where Rue hides from her. Later, Jules is shocked to see Rue at a campfire. Jules sits next to Rue and asks when she relapsed. Rue tells her that she relapsed the night Jules left, which causes her to tear up with guilt. Midnight strikes as Jules and Rue share a kiss. Rue introduces Elliot (Dominic Fike) to Jules. She does not know Elliot is also an addict who uses with Rue. David asks her if Rue is a good influence, claiming that she is part of the reason why she got on the train. Jules defends Rue, but is unable to answer the question.

Jules believes Elliot only wants to have sex with Rue, so interrogates him about his sexual orientation. Elliot tells the girlfriends that he wants to be friends with them, which Jules rejects, but the trio begin to spend more time together anyway. Elliot asks Jules if Rue is a sexual person, to which Jules admits that she is not. Elliot flirts with Jules. Jules performs cunnilingus on Rue, who is so high that she's unable to feel anything. Rue poorly fakes an orgasm to prevent Jules from feeling bad. Jules confides to Elliot about the encounter and after teasing each other, make out.

Rue, Jules, and Elliot dance together in his room and Rue excuses herself to the restroom. Jules tells Elliot that she believes that Rue has a crush on him. Rue kisses Elliot as part of a dare and Jules dares Elliot to kiss her body. The trio arrive at a liquor store and steal several cases of alcohol. Jules is displeased at seeing Rue drink alcohol. Rue tells Jules that she cannot stand her and asks to be dropped off home. Later that night, Elliot admits to Jules that Rue had been using opiates the entire time.

Jules tells Rue's mother Leslie Bennett (Nika King) about Rue's relapse. Rue becomes incensed and tells Jules that she is dead to her and ends their relationship. Rue harshly berates Jules and accuses her of leaving when she needed her. Nate apologizes for everything he did to Jules, saying that it was to protect his father. Nate reveals to Jules a recording of her and Cal having sex, and he gives the disk to her. Before she leaves Nate confesses to her that everything he said to her previously during their texting had been genuine, and she reciprocates. After receiving the disk, Jules destroys it. Jules tells Rue that she loves and misses her. Rue kisses Jules on the cheek and leaves. Jules begins to cry.

=== Season 3 (2026) ===
While at art school in Los Angeles, Jules is introduced to sugar dating by her roommate and becomes the paid mistress of plastic surgeon Ellis (Sam Trammell), who allows her to quit college and focus on painting, though he involves her in extreme BDSM such as mummification. Rue visits Jules at Ellis' penthouse apartment, where their tense conversation mixes resentment and attraction before Jules invites Rue to bathe with her. Rue makes Jules attend Cassie Howard (Sydney Sweeney) and Nate's extravagant wedding, where Jules shares brief reconciliations with the groom and Cal.

Lexi commissions Jules to create a prop painting made by the character Oceana (Madison Thompson) for LA Nights, the television series she works for. She gives her the prompt of A Sunday Afternoon on the Island of La Grande Jatte by Georges Seurat, but also says Jules has complete freedom. Jules creates a parody of said painting with naked figures that have penises and breasts. LA Nights director (Colleen Camp) and producer Patricia Lance (Sharon Stone) are appalled and request Jules give them clothes, Jules is emotionally distraught and destroys the painting.

After confronting Rue about her lack of intimacy, Jules gets berated by Ellis, who has found Rue's boxers in his penthouse, believing they are a man's. Rue visits Jules while she paints. Rue expresses interest in a serious relationship, including children, with Jules, but Jules rejects the idea as a fantasy. When Rue says Ellis does not love her, Jules slaps her. Jules grieves Rue's death from a fentanyl overdose by painting her drowning as Ellis comforts her.

== Impact ==
=== Style ===
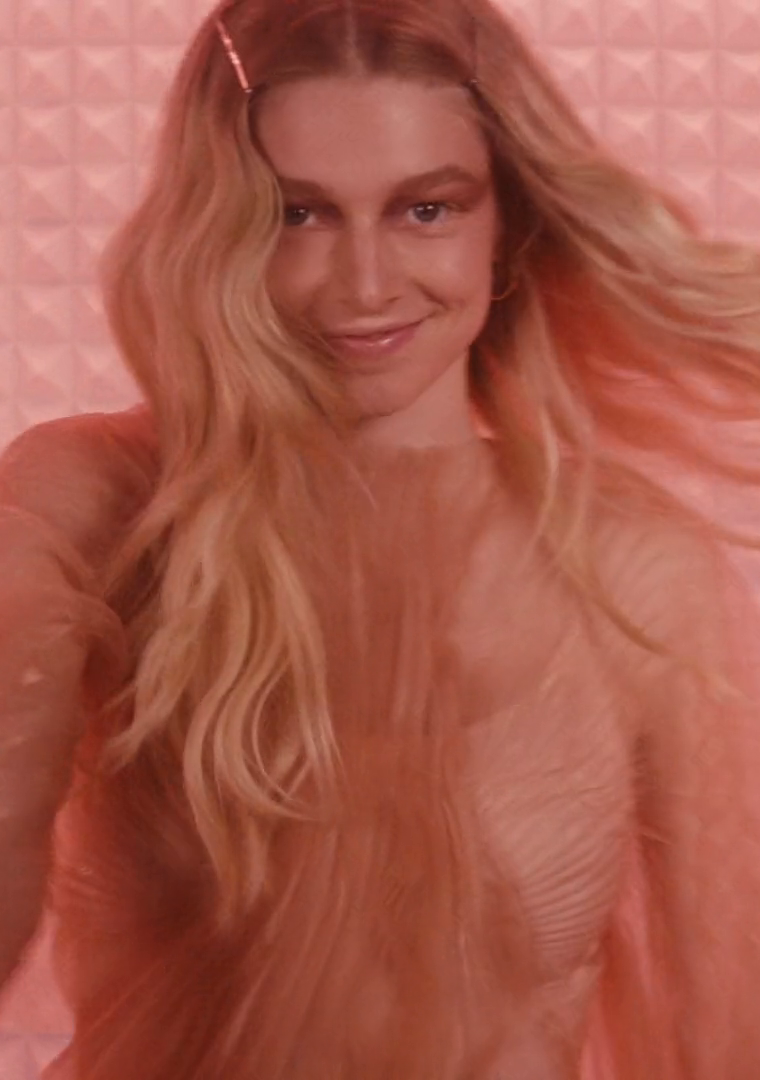
Hunter Schafer (pictured 2021) worked as a model before her debut on screen as Jules.

Elle has called Jules a style icon. The lifestyle magazine has said: "Jules, by far is the most experimental character in the show when it comes to fashion. In a quest to find herself, Jules is constantly exploring her wardrobe in the show." The magazine also called Jules "the perfect hybrid between an angel gone dark and a manic pixie anime character" and further added, "Layering is a key part of Jules' costumes—slip dresses on t-shirts, pleated skirts with crop tops paired with chunky platform heels and chokers for accessories best summarises her go-to looks."

Costume design team Katina Danabassis, Heidi Bivens, Danielle Baker, Devon Patterson, and Angelina Vitto collaborated with Schafer to make Jules' wardrobe. In season 1, Jules dressed in bright pastels and tennis skirts to embody "the youthful optimism that comes with a fresh start." But as Jules explores her gender identity and becomes more disillusioned with femininity in season 2, her costumes become "slightly muted, darker and more androgynous." This is accentuated by her occasionally breast binding.

=== Reception ===
Gay Times included Jules in a 2022 list of sixteen of "television's most trailblazing transgender characters". Entertainment Weekly described her as the anti-Manic Pixie Dream Girl. According to Screen Rant, "At first glance, Jules appears to be free-spirited, adventurous and confident. There's a lot more under the surface. Jules battles with depression and has a history of falling into toxic relationships." Queerty has called the character "brave" and "free-spirited". Vulture is quoted as saying "For queer audiences, there are always pangs of fear when a trans woman is onscreen — fear that, like in real life, her mere existence may solicit violence from the men around her. But then comes Jules in Euphoria. Pink hair and neon eye shadow, practically a superhero as she makes a bully squirm and assures him, herself, and the audience that she can't be hurt that there's nothing to fear – even if we know the danger is still very real. When Jules announced her invincibility, I immediately knew that Jules was going to be something special in TV's still incredibly limited pantheon of trans characters." GLAAD analyzed Jules as a stand out in the world of transgender characters on television.

Jules is a teenage trans woman, who "deals with concepts related to gender identity" and "navigates her own complex journey of self-discovery and acceptance". Schafer's portrayal of Jules has been widely praised and the actress herself has said "her personal connection to the character was too strong to ignore". Euphoria being Schafer's acting debut "will be hard for viewers to tell from the get-go" remarked Paper. Schafer was one of many transgender actors not nominated at the 72nd Primetime Emmy Awards who The Advocate said were snubbed and championed her nomination in the Primetime Emmy Award for Outstanding Supporting Actress in a Drama Series category. In 2022, Jules' and Elliot's kiss was nominated for the MTV Movie & TV Award for Best Kiss, to be shared between Fike and Schafer.

== See also ==
- List of fictional transgender characters
- List of transgender characters in television
- Media portrayals of transgender people
