= Euphoria (American TV series) =

2019 American drama series

- Genre: Teen drama; Psychological drama; Crime drama
- Created by: Sam Levinson
- Based on: Euphoria by: Ron Leshem; Daphna Levin
- Showrunner: Sam Levinson
- Written by: Sam Levinson (Note: Hunter Schafer co-wrote "Fuck Anyone Who's Not a Sea Blob" with Levinson.)
- Directed by: Augustine Frizzell; Sam Levinson; Jennifer Morrison; Pippa Bianco
- Starring: see List of Euphoria characters
- Narrated by: Zendaya (Note: Maude Apatow narrates "The Theater and Its Double".)
- Composers: Labrinth; Gustave Rudman Rambali; Hans Zimmer
- Country of origin: United States
- Original language: English
- No. of seasons: 3
- No. of episodes: 26

Production
- Executive producers: Sam Levinson; Kevin Turen; Ravi Nandan; Drake; Adel "Future" Nur; Ron Leshem; Daphna Levin; Hadas Mozes Lichtenstein; Gary Lennon; Mirit Toovi; Tmira Yardeni; Yoram Mokadi; Jim Kleverweis; Zendaya; Will Greenfield; Ashley Levinson; Hunter Schafer; Sara E. White
- Producers: Tyler Romary; Philipp A. Barnett; Jamie Feldman; Kenneth Yu; Harrison Kreiss; Amy J Schmidt
- Production location: California
- Cinematography: Marcell Rév; André Chemetoff; Drew Daniels; Adam Newport-Berra; Rina Yang
- Editors: Julio C. Perez IV; Laura Zempel; Harry Yoon; Aaron I. Butler; Darrin Navarro; Nikola Boyanov; Aleshka Ferrero
- Camera setup: Single-camera
- Running time: 49–93 minutes
- Production companies: The Reasonable Bunch; A24; Little Lamb; DreamCrew; ADD Content Agency; HOT; Tedy Productions; HBO Entertainment; Tiny Goat
- Budget: $110–165 million (Note: This amount represents the total qualified expenditures for the California Film & Television Tax Credit and excludes other non-qualifying costs.)

Original release
- Network: HBO
- Release: June 16, 2019 – May 31, 2026

Related
- The Idol

Euphoria is an American psychological drama television series created and written by Sam Levinson for HBO. Based on the Israeli miniseries of the same name created by Ron Leshem and Daphna Levin, the series stars Zendaya as drug-addicted teenager Rue Bennett, who also serves as an unreliable narrator. The ensemble cast includes Maude Apatow, Angus Cloud, Eric Dane, Alexa Demie, Jacob Elordi, Barbie Ferreira, Nika King, Storm Reid, Hunter Schafer, Algee Smith, Sydney Sweeney, Colman Domingo, Javon "Wanna" Walton, and Austin Abrams. Dominic Fike, Adewale Akinnuoye-Agbaje, Martha Kelly, Chloe Cherry, and Toby Wallace join later in the series.

Euphoria's executive producers include Levinson, Zendaya, Leshem, Drake, and Gary Lennon. The series is filmed in Los Angeles, and follows a group of high schoolers in the fictional town of East Highland, California. The eight-episode first season was broadcast between June 16 and August 4, 2019. Two specials were broadcast in December 2020 and January 2021. The eight-episode second season was broadcast between January 9 and February 27, 2022. The eight-episode third season was broadcast between April 12 and May 31, 2026. It is set five years later and away from the high school setting of the first two seasons, and on the same day that the final episode was released, HBO confirmed that the series had concluded after three seasons.

The first two seasons received generally positive reviews, with praise for its cinematography, score, performances of the cast, and approach to its mature subject matter. Some critics found the nudity and sexual content excessive due to the characters' ages. The third season received mixed reviews from critics. It is the fourth most-watched HBO series since 2004. The series has received numerous accolades, including thirty two Primetime Emmy Award nominations and nine wins. In 2020 and 2022, Zendaya won Outstanding Lead Actress in a Drama Series for the first two seasons. The series was also nominated for Outstanding Drama Series and in 2020, the series was nominated for the GLAAD Media Award for Outstanding Drama Series for excellence in media portrayal of LGBTQ people and themes.

== Cast and characters ==
- Zendaya as Rue Bennett, a struggling drug addict who returns from rehab and struggles to become sober while finding her place in the world. She has an on-and-off relationship with Jules, to whom she often lies in her struggle to stay clean during their relationship. Rue serves as the series narrator and knows intimate details about various characters.
- Maude Apatow as Lexi Howard, Rue's childhood best friend and Cassie's younger sister, who has trouble finding her confidence. She tries to help Rue beat her addictions with limited success.
- Angus Cloud as Patrick "Fezco" O'Neill (seasons 1–2), a drug dealer who has a close relationship with Rue and his adopted brother Ashtray.
- Eric Dane as Cal Jacobs, Nate's closeted real-estate venturing father who has a dangerous double life and hidden past.
- Alexa Demie as Maddy Perez, a popular cheerleader and Cassie's best friend.
- Jacob Elordi as Nate Jacobs, a star American football player, Cassie's husband and Maddy's on-and-off abusive ex-boyfriend, whose severe anger issues mask his sexual insecurities.
- Barbie Ferreira as Kat Hernandez (seasons 1–2), a girl fighting for body positivity while exploring her sexuality and self-confidence.
- Nika King as Leslie Bennett (seasons 1–2; guest season 3), Rue and Gia's mother who struggles living with Rue's addiction.
- Storm Reid as Gia Bennett (seasons 1–2), Rue's younger sister who became traumatized after finding her following an overdose.
- Hunter Schafer as Jules Vaughn, a transgender girl who has a turbulent relationship with Rue after moving to East Highland with her father. She becomes Rue's on-and-off girlfriend and explores her sexuality and personal identity as a transgender teen.
- Algee Smith as Chris McKay (seasons 1–2), a football player and Cassie's ex-boyfriend who has difficulties adjusting to college.
- Sydney Sweeney as Cassie Jacobs (née Howard), Lexi's older sister, Maddy's best friend, Nate's wife, and Chris's ex-girlfriend with an infamous sexual history that haunts her.
- Colman Domingo as Ali Muhammed (né Martin McQueen) ("Trouble Don't Last Always"; recurring seasons 1–3), a man in recovery from drug addiction who often speaks at Rue's Narcotics Anonymous meetings and eventually becomes her sponsor and mentor.
- Javon "Wanna" Walton as Ashtray "Ash" (season 2; recurring season 1), Fezco's unofficially adopted "little brother" and a drug dealer.
- Austin Abrams as Ethan Daley (season 2; recurring season 1), Kat's boyfriend who later portrays the lead role in Lexi's play.
- Dominic Fike as Elliot (season 2), a new friend of Rue's who begins to come between her and Jules's budding romantic relationship.
- Adewale Akinnuoye-Agbaje as Alamo Brown (season 3), a dangerous-yet-magnetic strip club magnate who takes Rue under his wing.
- Martha Kelly as Laurie (season 3; recurring season 2), a former schoolteacher turned drug dealer.
- Chloe Cherry as Faye Valentine (season 3; recurring season 2), a drug addict who befriends Fezco and Ashtray after she is wanted by the police and ends up working for Laurie.
- Toby Wallace as Wayne (season 3), one of Laurie's relatives and a drug dealer.

== Episodes ==
Season	Episodes	Originally released	
Season	Episodes	First released	Last released
1	8	June 16, 2019	August 4, 2019
Specials	2	December 6, 2020	January 24, 2021
2	8	January 9, 2022	February 27, 2022
3	8	April 12, 2026	May 31, 2026

=== Season 1 (2019) ===
No. overall	No. in season	Title	Directed by	Written by	Original release date	U.S. viewers (millions)
1	1	"Pilot"	Augustine Frizzell	Sam Levinson	June 16, 2019	0.577
2	2	"Stuntin' Like My Daddy"	Sam Levinson	Sam Levinson	June 23, 2019	0.574
3	3	"Made You Look"	Sam Levinson	Sam Levinson	June 30, 2019	0.493
4	4	"Shook Ones Pt. II"	Sam Levinson	Sam Levinson	July 7, 2019	0.609
5	5	" '03 Bonnie and Clyde"	Jennifer Morrison	Sam Levinson	July 14, 2019	0.579
6	6	"The Next Episode"	Pippa Bianco	Sam Levinson	July 21, 2019	0.569
7	7	"The Trials and Tribulations of Trying to Pee While Depressed"	Sam Levinson	Sam Levinson	July 28, 2019	0.549
8	8	"And Salt the Earth Behind You"	Sam Levinson	Sam Levinson	August 4, 2019	0.530

=== Specials (2020–21) ===
No. overall	No. in specials	Title	Directed by	Written by	Original release date	U.S. viewers (millions)
9	1	"Trouble Don't Last Always"	Sam Levinson	Sam Levinson	December 6, 2020	0.236
10	2	"Fuck Anyone Who's Not a Sea Blob"	Sam Levinson	Sam Levinson & Hunter Schafer	January 24, 2021	0.109

=== Season 2 (2022) ===
No. overall	No. in season	Title	Directed by	Written by	Original release date	U.S. viewers (millions)
11	1	"Trying to Get to Heaven Before They Close the Door"	Sam Levinson	Sam Levinson	January 9, 2022	0.254
12	2	"Out of Touch"	Sam Levinson	Sam Levinson	January 16, 2022	0.279
13	3	"Ruminations: Big and Little Bullys"	Sam Levinson	Sam Levinson	January 23, 2022	0.264
14	4	"You Who Cannot See, Think of Those Who Can"	Sam Levinson	Sam Levinson	January 30, 2022	0.318
15	5	"Stand Still Like the Hummingbird"	Sam Levinson	Sam Levinson	February 6, 2022	0.353
16	6	"A Thousand Little Trees of Blood"	Sam Levinson	Sam Levinson	February 13, 2022	0.283
17	7	"The Theater and Its Double"	Sam Levinson	Sam Levinson	February 20, 2022	0.350
18	8	"All My Life, My Heart Has Yearned for a Thing I Cannot Name"	Sam Levinson	Sam Levinson	February 27, 2022	0.625

=== Season 3 (2026) ===
No. overall	No. in season	Title	Directed by	Written by	Original release date	U.S. viewers (millions)
19	1	"Ándale"	Sam Levinson	Sam Levinson	April 12, 2026	0.356
20	2	"America My Dream"	Sam Levinson	Sam Levinson	April 19, 2026	0.325
21	3	"The Ballad of Paladin"	Sam Levinson	Sam Levinson	April 26, 2026	0.399
22	4	"Kitty Likes to Dance"	Sam Levinson	Sam Levinson	May 3, 2026	0.387
23	5	"This Little Piggy"	Sam Levinson	Sam Levinson	May 10, 2026	0.356
24	6	"Stand Still and See"	Sam Levinson	Sam Levinson	May 17, 2026	0.333
25	7	"Rain or Shine"	Sam Levinson	Sam Levinson	May 24, 2026	0.308
26	8	"In God We Trust"	Sam Levinson	Sam Levinson	May 31, 2026	0.461

== Production ==
=== Development ===
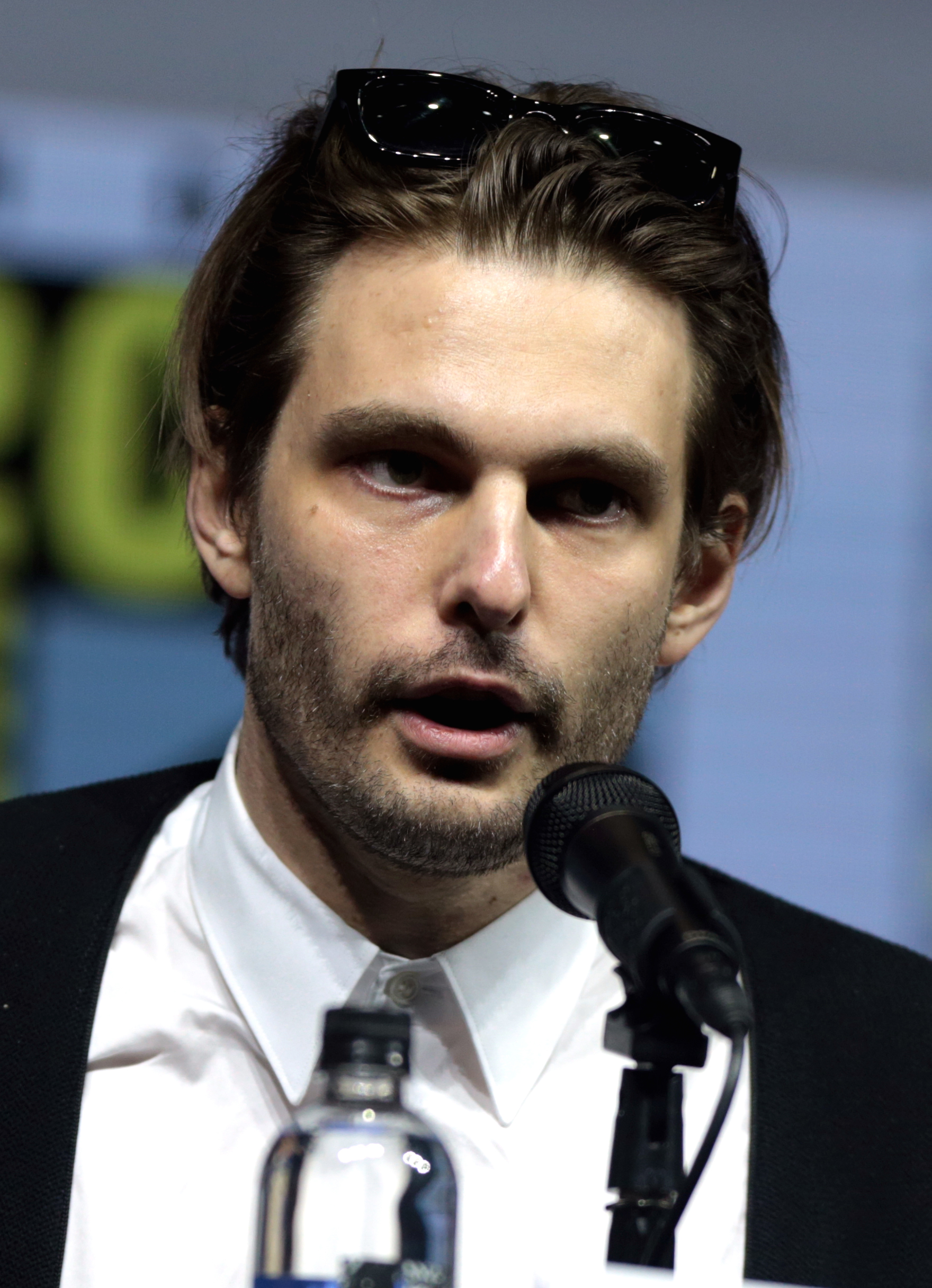
Series creator, showrunner, and writer Sam Levinson also directs almost all episodes.

In 2006, Sam Levinson began drafting different versions of what eventually became Euphoria, based on his personal experiences as a teenager and his struggles with anxiety, depression, and drug addiction. In June 2017, he was invited to a meeting with HBO's head of drama, Francesca Orsi about an adaptation of the 2012 Israeli television series Euphoria created by Ron Leshem, Daphna Levin, and Tamira Yardeni. Levinson recalled the meeting with Orsi: "We just had a conversation about just life and her life and my life and various struggles that, you know, we've been through and things and she said, 'Great, you know, well go and write that' and I said 'What?' and she goes 'Everything we just talked about'". Orsi liked the "raw and honest" portrayal of drug use and other teenage problems in the Israeli series, and in a press release described the American version as "Kids meets Trainspotting" with no parental supervision. The production was given a pilot order on March 13, 2018, and on July 30, it was announced that HBO had given the production a series order.

Levinson has served as Euphoria's showrunner since its premiere and has written every episode. He has cited teenage anxiety as an influence for the series: "There is this consistent anxiety that I think exists in this generation that I think informed the whole filmmaking process." He has directed every episode bar three directed by Augustine Frizzell, Jennifer Morrison and Pippa Bianco. Euphoria is a co-production of The Reasonable Bunch, A24, Little Lamb, DreamCrew, and HBO Entertainment. It has sixteen executive producers, including Levinson, Leshem, Levin, Yardeni, Hadas Mozes Lichtenstein, Mirit Toovi, Yoram Mokadi, Gary Lennon, Zendaya, Canadian rapper Drake, Future the Prince, Ravi Nandan, and Kevin Turen.

The series was renewed for a second season on July 11, 2019. Before its release, HBO ordered two special episodes. Production for the second season was scheduled to start in the second quarter of 2020, with the first table read on March 11, but the COVID-19 pandemic delayed the production. Production resumed in March 2021, with filming from April to November. HBO defended the series against allegations of a toxic work environment during the production of the second season, writing: "The well-being of cast and crew on our productions is always a top priority. The production was in full compliance with all safety guidelines and guild protocols. It's not uncommon for drama series to have complex shoots, and COVID protocols add an additional layer. We maintain an open line of communication with all the guilds, including SAG-AFTRA. There were never any formal inquiries raised."

On February 4, 2022, HBO renewed the series for a third season. In September 2022, HBO's CEO Casey Bloys said the series would not end after the third season. Production of the third season was set to start in February 2023, aiming for a late 2023 release. The third season production was disrupted by the 2023 Writers Guild of America strike. In May 2023, Euphoria was confirmed to take place in the same universe as Levinson's 2023 television series The Idol. Euphoria series regular Alexa Demie makes an uncredited cameo appearance in the series' first episode. Pre-production for the third season had begun by December 2023. Principal photography began in January 2025 and wrapped in November. On May 31, 2026, the same day that the final episode of the third season was released, HBO confirmed that the series had concluded after three seasons. In an interview with The New York Times, Levinson elaborated on his decision to end the series and stated: "In terms of the story that we set out to tell, which is a story about addiction and its consequences, this feels like the end to me". He noted that the final episode also acted as a tribute to Angus Cloud following his death from a drug overdose in 2023 and said, "It was a way of honoring Angus and saying a prayer for the future".

=== Casting ===
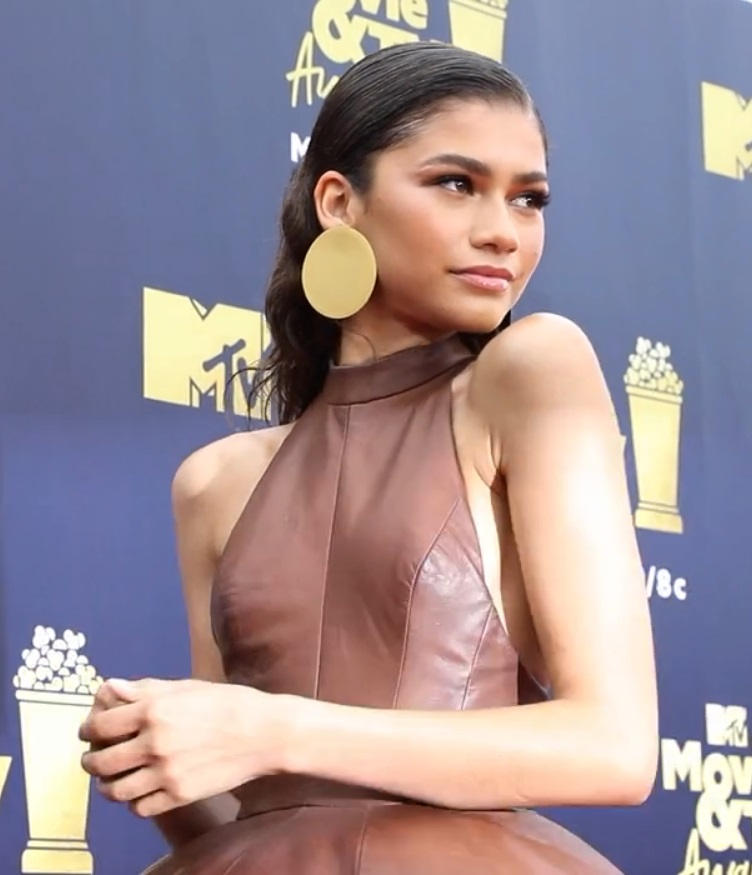
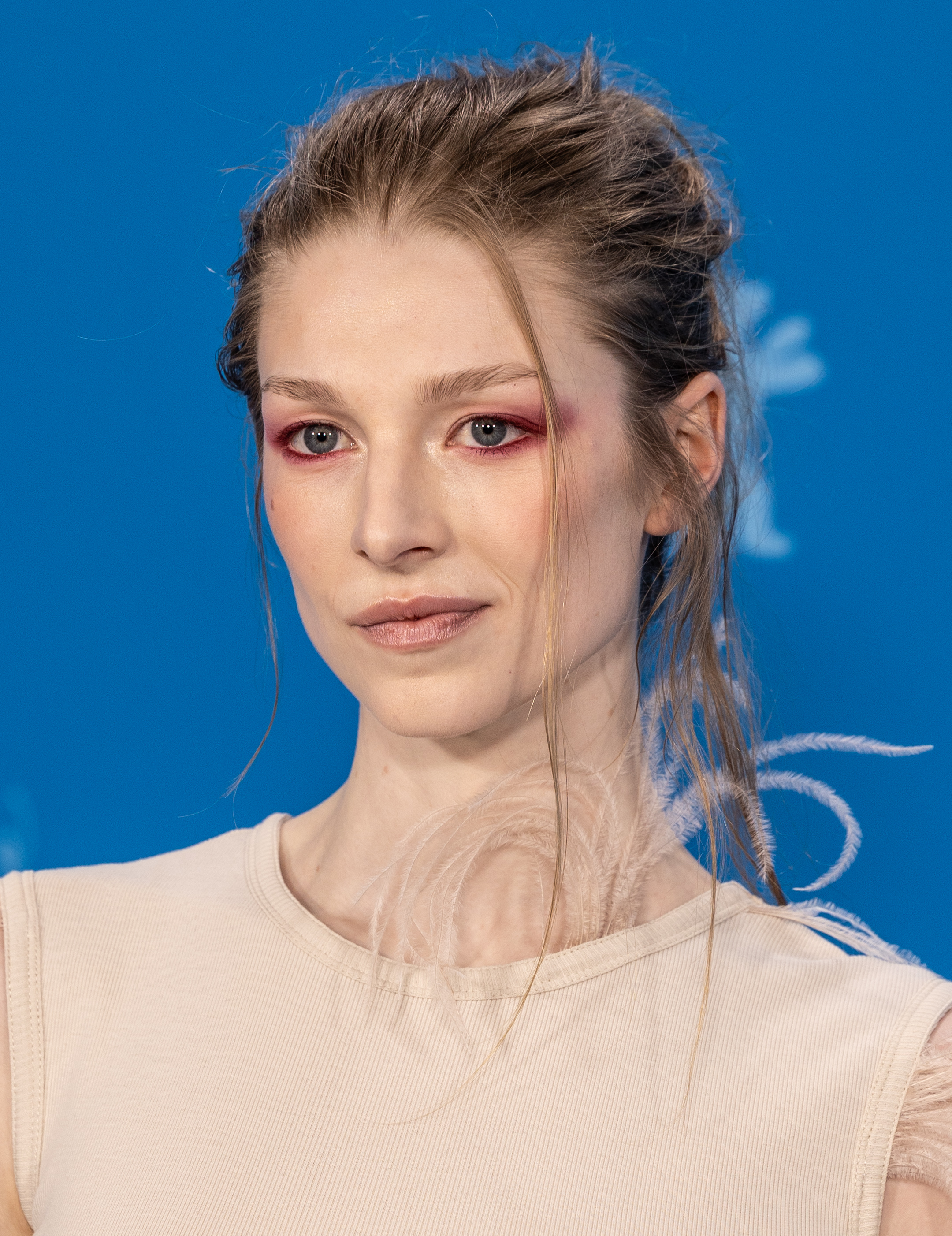
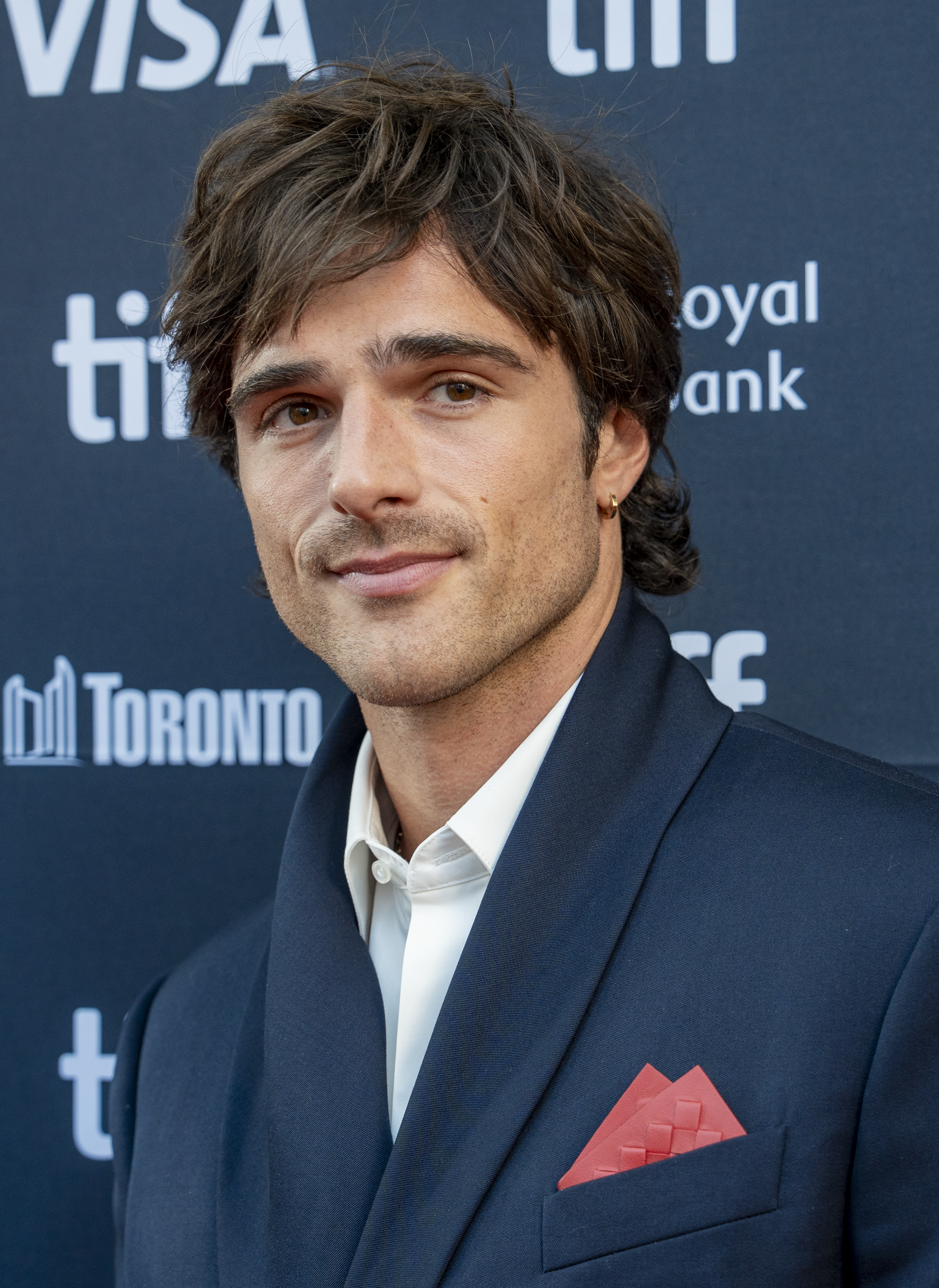
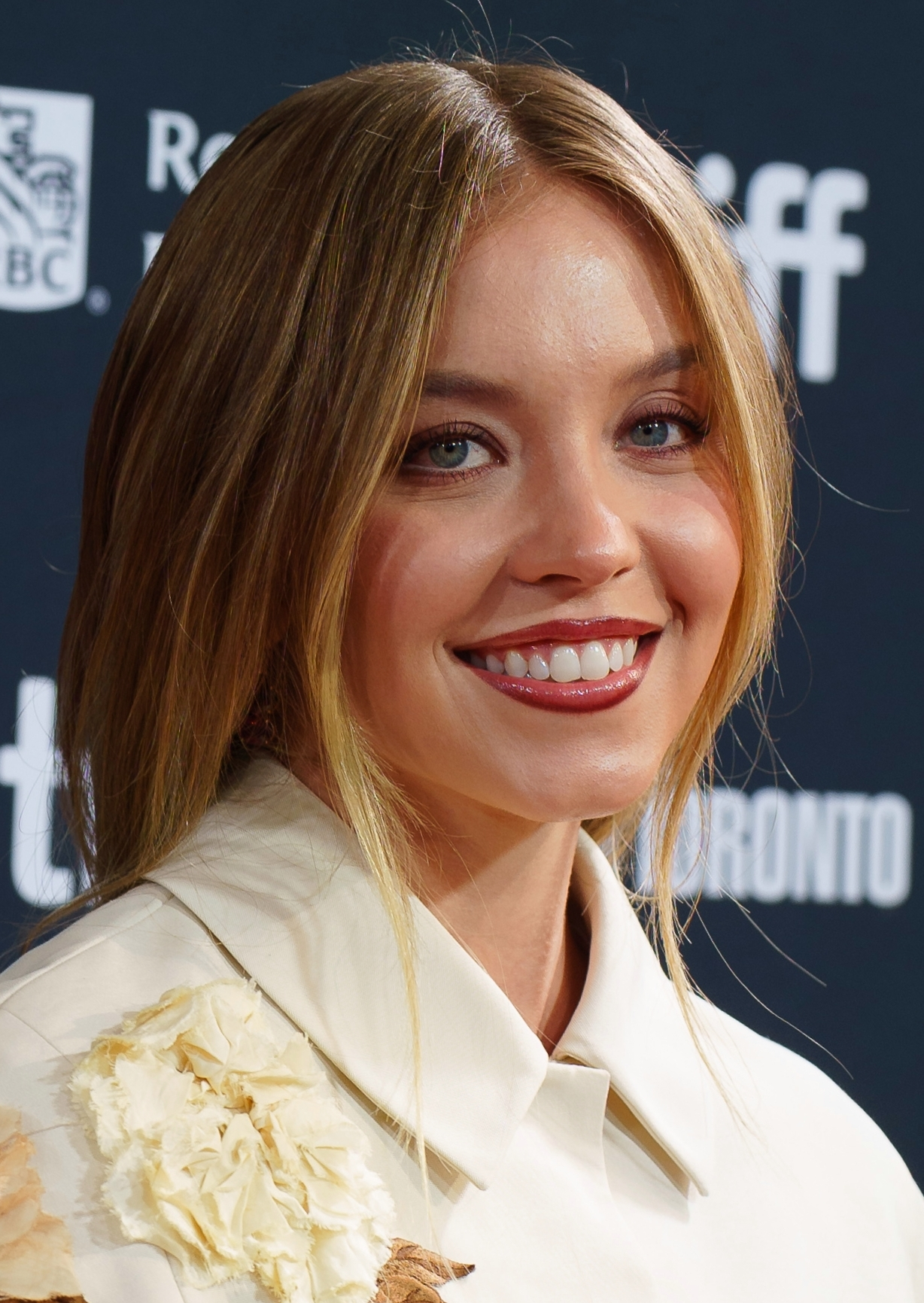
Clockwise: The cast includes Zendaya, Hunter Schafer, Sydney Sweeney, and Jacob Elordi

On June 7, 2018, it was announced that the pilot would star Zendaya, Storm Reid, Maude Apatow, Eric Dane, Angus Cloud, Alexa Demie, Jacob Elordi, Barbie Ferreira, Nika King, Hunter Schafer, and Sydney Sweeney. On October 31, Austin Abrams was cast and Algee Smith replaced Stro, who reportedly quit the series after shooting the pilot as he was uncomfortable with "shooting scenes that weren’t in the original pilot script and suggested his character would experiment with homosexuality in future episodes."

On August 6, 2021, Dominic Fike was added to the main cast of season 2. On August 24, 2022, Ferreira announced via Instagram that she had decided to leave the series. On April 5, 2023, she stated: "I just felt like, maybe it's like I overstayed my welcome a little bit. So for me, I actually felt good to be like, 'Okay, I get to not worry about this, and we both don't get too worried about this', because it's exhausting."

On July 31, 2023, Cloud died before production of the third season had begun. In July 2024, Colman Domingo confirmed that he would be reprising his role in the third season. In November, Reid announced she would not be returning for the third season. In February 2025, it was reported that series regulars Smith, King, Abrams, and Javon "Wanna" Walton would also not be returning. Martha Kelly and Chloe Cherry were reported to have been promoted to series regulars for the third season, with Adewale Akinnuoye-Agbaje and Toby Wallace also joining the main cast. On February 19, 2026, Dane died after having completed his work on the third season.

=== Filming ===
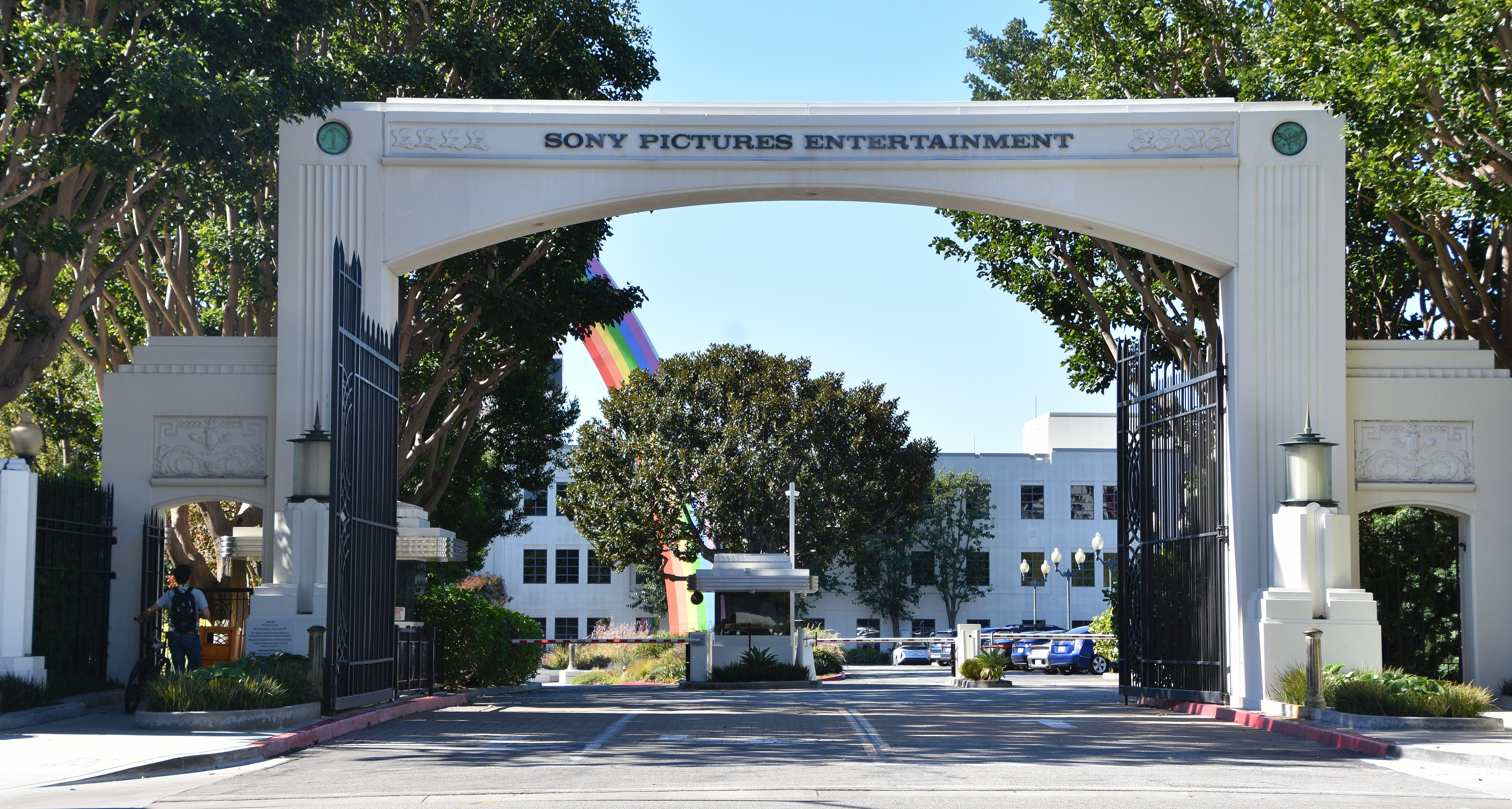
Sony Pictures Studios in Culver City, California provided sound stages for the series.

Primary photography takes place in Sony Pictures Studios in Culver City, California. Grant High School in Los Angeles stands in for the fictional East Highland High School. According to the California Film Commission, the first season of Euphoria received $8,378,000 in incentive tax credits. The first season was filmed over 104 days; the second season's production costs totaled $96,685,000 after 176 filming days. The second season received a $19,406,000 tax credit for employing over 15,000 people in California.

Rue Bennett's actress Zendaya received $500,000 per episode in the first two seasons and $1,000,000 per episode in the third season. Out of respect for the actors and extras involved, filming of nudity was conducted on a closed set, and for sex scenes, an intimacy coordinator was used.

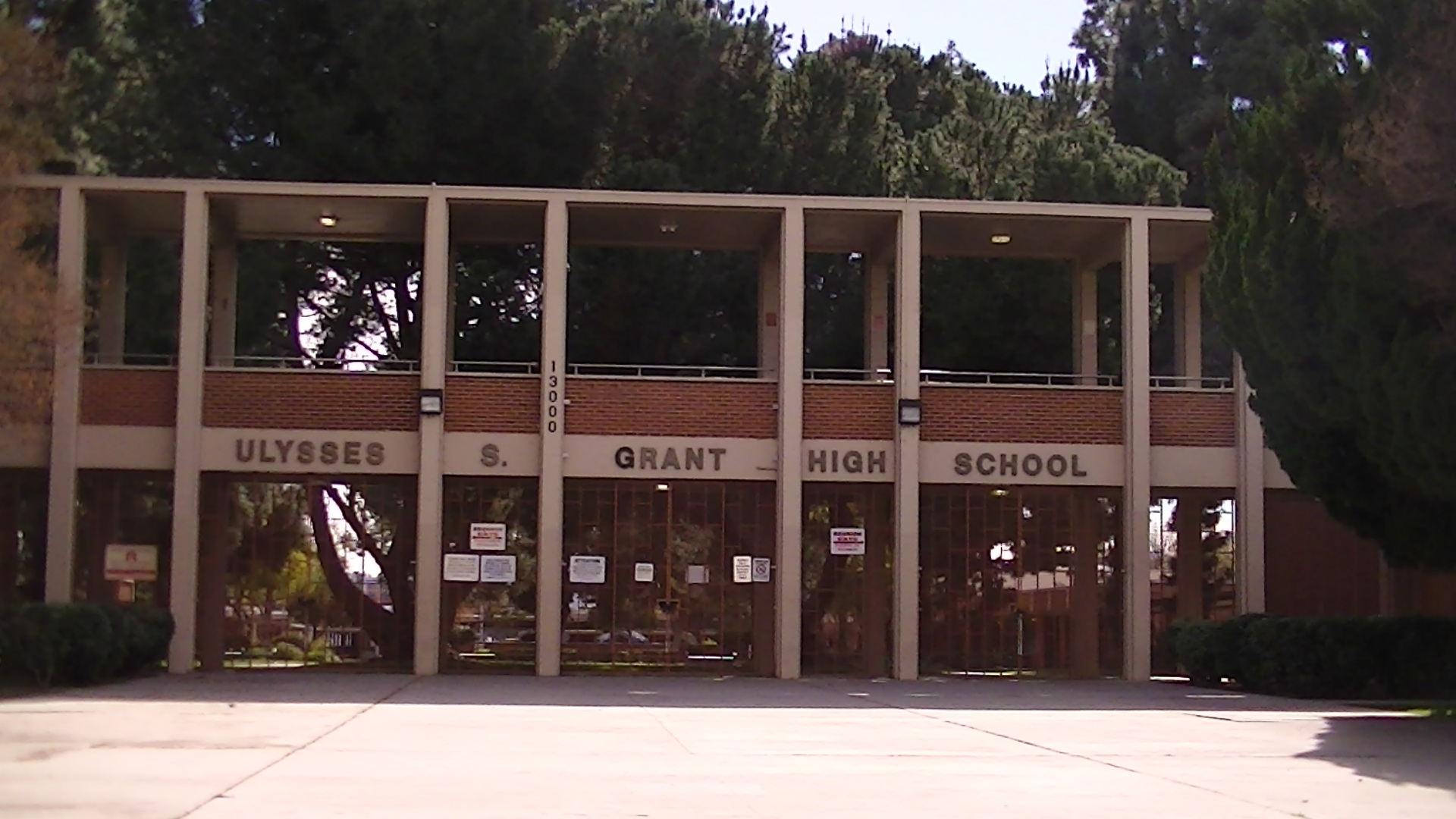
East Highland High School's real equivalent is Grant High School in Valley Glen, Los Angeles.

Zendaya said she wanted to explore characters outside the high school setting in the third season, Filming quietly began in January 2025 with all of the scenes set inside the strip club being shot first. Filming was officially announced on February 10. Zendaya and Priscilla Delgado were spotted filming a scene from episode 2 on February 28. In March, Demie was shooting scenes with Adewale Akinnuoye-Agbaje. Domingo filmed some of his scenes in March and returned to film the rest in July. Elordi and Dane started shooting in April. As a result of her busy schedule, Zendaya was forced to shoot all her scenes in a truncated timeline, stating: "It was a whirlwind. I did what I do in eight months in like four months. It was like trying to get eight episodes in at once. It just flew by me". Zendaya wrapped her scenes in June. In October, Elordi wrapped shooting his role while Sweeney filmed her final scenes in November.

=== Cinematography ===
The show employs hyper-stylized cinematography, which presents an "emotional realism" that captures the inner perspectives of the series's adolescent characters. During pre-production, Levinson reportedly told photographer Petra Collins that he had "written a show inspired by her work and asked her to come and direct". After working with Levinson on the series for five months, Collins was informed by HBO that she was "too young" to direct. Reactions to the series following its release included comparisons to Collins' work and its influence on the show's visual style. The first season was shot digitally using the Arri Alexa 65 camera. The two special episodes and second season were shot on 35 mm movie film, primarily cross processed Kodak's Ektachrome stock, which distorted how set lighting looked on camera and cinematographer Marcell Rév attributed to a desire to invoke "some sort of memory of high school". The third season also used Kodak and added 65 mm film, including a new stock called Verita created specifically for the show.

The series often uses saturated colors to illustrate its characters' emotional states. Shades of green and yellow regularly symbolize distress, while purple and blue convey an elated, feverish atmosphere. In shooting both day and night exteriors, Rév relied on an exaggerated orange-blue scheme, translated in the use of backlights and tungsten lights, to create visuals that feel "almost dreamlike". LED lamps and SkyPanels were used in several interior shoots to make tones more vivid. "For camera movements, we really wanted it to have a certain energy that ties the different storylines together. So, I would say the camera movement is the glue in the show, that glues it together", said Rév of the energized design element that stands out. Extensive whip pans and tracking shots were employed to portray intimacy, growth, and interrelationship.

=== Costumes and makeup ===
Examples of Euphoria makeup.

The costume design is arguably the series' most notable and influential hallmark. Jamila Stewart of Vogue stated that Euphoria still has a palpable impact on where fashion trends fall today. The characters often wear chic, flamboyant outfits that serve as "plot devices and psychological profiles" to represent their personalities and character arcs. For example, in season 1, costume designer Heidi Bivens dressed Jules Vaughn, a transgender girl, in a wardrobe of bright pastels and tennis skirts, inspired by the character's interest in anime and fantasy, to embody "the youthful optimism that comes with a fresh start" and her journey to "conquer" femininity, but as Jules explores her gender identity and becomes more disillusioned between seasons 1 and 2, she "slips into a slightly muted, darker and more androgynous" wardrobe.

Into the Gloss spoke of the makeup: "since the first episode, it's all everyone's been talking about. And while naysayers will point out that Euphoria's makeup is too good to be realistic, seeing it reminded me quite a bit of the very real makeup I used to wear in high school." Series head makeup artist Doniella Davy told Allure that "there's subliminal emotional messages always in all the makeup". Season 1's makeup trended on TikTok in 2020, where people recreated looks from the show. In season 2, Davy opted for "more refined and more subtle" glam, saying that "It's not a repeat of season one". Davy wanted the makeup to be more "discoverable" as opposed to "impossible to miss." Levinson wanted a more natural look with "dewy skin". Women's Health wrote that the makeup in the series "helped change beauty culture and challenge" the clean girl aesthetic.

=== Music ===
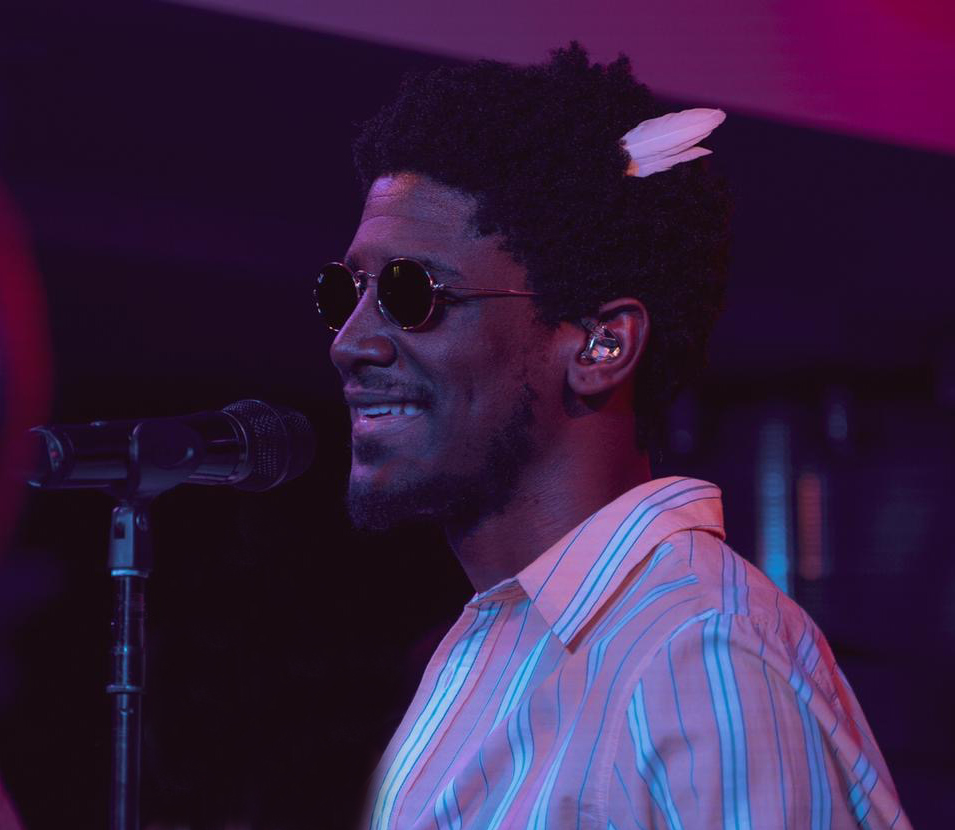
Labrinth composed original music for the first two seasons.

Season 1 and 2's music was composed by British record producer Labrinth. Euphoria (Original Score from the HBO Series) was released by Sony Masterworks through Milan Records on October 4, 2019. Euphoria Season 2 Official Score (From the HBO Original Series) was released by Columbia Records on April 22, 2022. In October 2019, Labrinth told Rolling Stone about the mentality behind score: "When you look back to your teenage days, it feels semi-magical but semi-crazy and semi-psychotic. I wanted to make sure the music felt like those things." In a favorable review for Variety, A.D. Amorosi described the score as "the holy lilt of gospel, orchestral and electronic".

The series also makes extensive use of licensed popular music, including hip-hop, trap, rhythm and blues, experimental, indie rock, standards and doo-wop, with some episodes featuring over twenty songs. Soundtracks to season 1 and season 2 was released by Interscope Records on May 14, 2021, and March 4, 2022.

In July 2025, it was announced that Hans Zimmer had joined the series to compose the third season. In March 2026, Labrinth released a strongly worded personal statement on his social media where he criticized both his record label and the series. The following month, Labrinth elaborated on his departure from Euphoria and confirmed that his music had been removed from the third season. Zimmer was credited as the sole composer for that season. His contribution was released as a separate album, Euphoria: Season 3 (HBO Original Series Soundtrack) through Milan Records on May 29, 2026.

== Release ==
During the course of the series, 26 episodes of Euphoria aired over three seasons, between June 16, 2019, and May 31, 2026. The eight-episode first season premiered on HBO on June 16, 2019, and concluded on August 4. Two television specials were released on December 6, 2020, and January 24, 2021, respectively. (Note: The Euphoria specials were released three days early on HBO Max.) The eight-episode second season premiered on January 9, 2022, and concluded on February 27. The eight-episode third season premiered on April 12, 2026, and concluded on May 31.

In Southeast Asia, Hong Kong, and Taiwan, the series premiered on June 17, 2019, through HBO Asia. In Australia, it premiered on June 17, 2019, through Foxtel. In the United Kingdom and the Republic of Ireland, it premiered on August 6, 2019, through Sky Atlantic.

=== Home media ===
The first and second seasons (including the two special episodes) were released on DVD on November 1, 2022, by Warner Bros. Home Entertainment. This is the first A24 series not to be released from Lionsgate Home Entertainment. A complete series box-set is expected to be released on DVD and Blu-ray on December 15, 2026.

== Reception ==
=== Critical response ===
Critical response of Euphoria
Season	Rotten Tomatoes	Metacritic
1	80% (100 reviews)	67 (27 reviews)
2	78% (113 reviews)	74 (19 reviews)
3	44% (76 reviews)	56 (27 reviews)

==== Season 1 ====
The first season was met with a positive response from critics, with praise for its acting (in particular that of Zendaya), storyline, visuals, and approach to mature subject matter. However, it met with controversy for the amount of drug use and nudity throughout the show. On the review aggregator website Rotten Tomatoes, the first season received a score of 80%, based on 100 reviews, with an average rating of 7.4/10. The website's consensus reads: "a uniquely challenging and illuminating series, held together by a powerfully understated performance from Zendaya." The review aggregator website Metacritic, which uses a weighted average, assigned the first season a score of 67 out of 100, based on 27 critic reviews. Ben Travers of IndieWire praised the show's authenticity, how HBO "grounds itself in stark reality", and Zendaya's performance and narration. Tim Goodman of The Hollywood Reporter noted Zendaya's performance and the handling of the subject matter. Pilot Viruet of Observer called the show "visually stunning" and praised the ensemble's performance, but criticized the writing as "shaky, filled with clunky lines", and recommended that the show "keep its focus narrow".

==== Specials ====
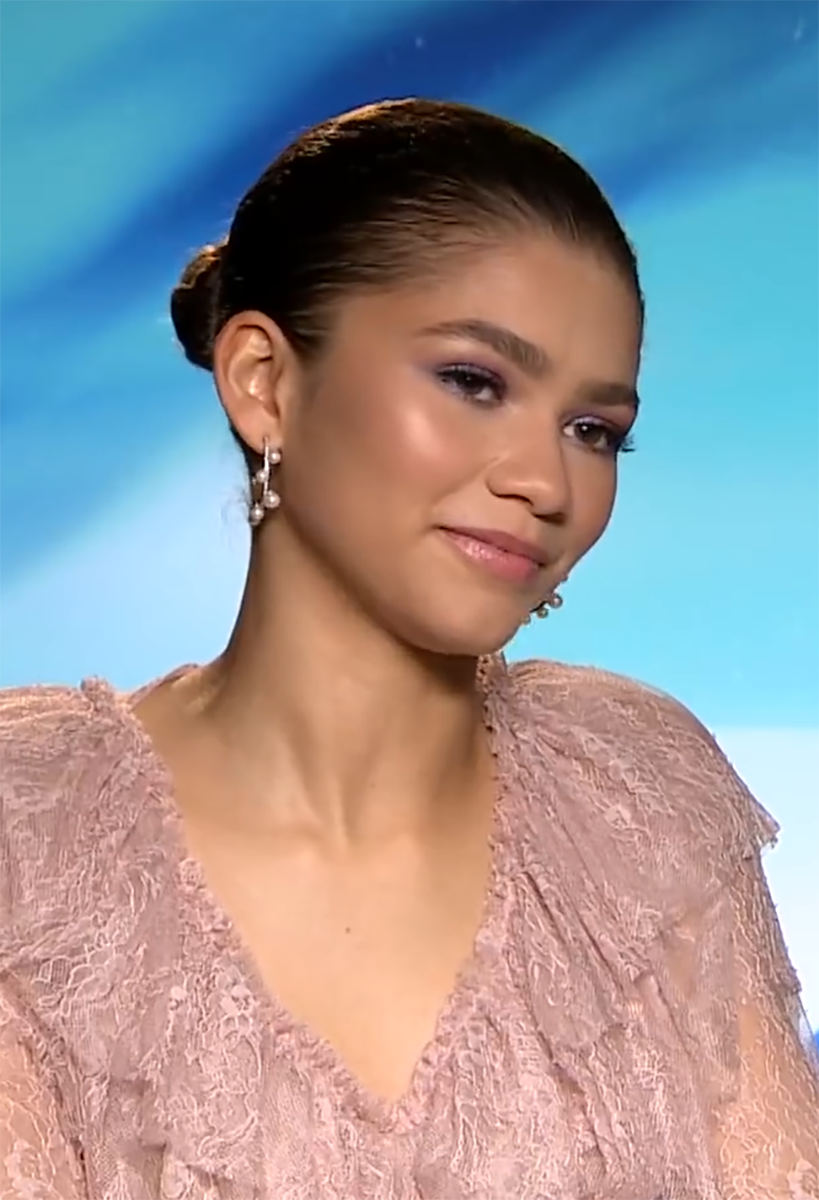
Zendaya's performance as Rue Bennett won her two Primetime Emmy Award for Outstanding Lead Actress in a Drama Series.

Both specials received widespread critical acclaim for their writing, performances, and shift in tone and content from the first season. On Rotten Tomatoes, the specials received scores of 97% and 96%, based on 30 and 23 reviews, respectively. The website's critical consensus for "Trouble Don't Last Always" reads, "Euphoria slows down the tempo without losing the beat in a special episode that pairs a raw Zendaya with a steady Colman Domingo to create small screen magic." "Fuck Anyone Who's Not a Sea Blob"'s reads, "By centering on Jules' journey, "Fuck Anyone Who's Not a Sea Blob" adds welcome depth to her character and gives Hunter Schafer plenty of room to shine." Metacritic assigned the specials a score of 84 and 78 out of 100, respectively, both based on 10 critic reviews.

==== Season 2 ====
The second season received mostly positive reviews, with critics praising the performances and visuals but criticizing the pace and characterization. On Rotten Tomatoes, the second season received a score of 78%, based on 113 reviews, with an average rating of 6.9/10. The site's critical consensus reads, "As willfully provocative as ever in its second season, Euphoria still isn't for all tastes—but when its addictive ingredients are mixed just right, the results remain intoxicating." Metacritic assigned the second season a score of 74 out of 100, based on 19 critic reviews. IndieWire's Travers criticized the sexual content but appreciated Zendaya's performance, writing, "After seven of the eight episodes, Season 2 is exactly what a drama seeking to spark conversation fears most: It's skippable." Rebecca Nicholson for The Guardian gave the second season two out of five, writing, "this long-awaited second season has decided to lean into its crueller instincts".

==== Season 3 ====
On Rotten Tomatoes, the third season received a score of 44%, based on 76 reviews, with an average rating of 5.8/10. The site's critical consensus reads, "Euphoria returns with less than the sum of its parts in a disjointed cavalcade of forced narratives that leave its talented cast stranded in the wind." Metacritic assigned the third season a score of 56 out of 100, based on 27 critic reviews. Daniel Fienberg wrote in The Hollywood Reporter, "Zendaya still dazzles, but has Sam Levinson's HBO drama aged out of relevance?" New Statesman's Catharine Hughes was highly critical, writing, "Levinson has brought this cast, at the height of their fame, back for what feels more like a humiliation ritual than a victory lap. These actors have graduated from Euphoria High, and the thing with school reunions is that no one wants to go to them." Variety wrote that the season "feels like entertaining but disjointed fan fiction."

=== Controversies ===
Some commentators and organizations have criticized the series's explicit content, including self-harm, excessive drug use, and sexual material amongst its teenage characters, content present in other HBO series, including Big Little Lies, Game of Thrones, Girls, Luck, and Westworld. The conservative media advocacy group Parents Television and Media Council called the series "dark, depraved, degenerate and nihilistic", and asked HBO and AT&T to end it. Common Sense Media, which provides information on media's suitability for children, also noted the strong adult themes and advised against teenage viewership. The Guardian wrote that writers and producers should find new ways to shock audiences. In 2022, Minka Kelly said she felt discomfort at the quantity of nude scenes in the series. Drug Abuse Resistance Education criticized the series's depiction of drug use, saying that it "chooses to misguidedly glorify and erroneously depict high school student drug use addiction ... and other destructive behaviors as common in today's world". Samuel Getachew wrote in a Culture piece for Vogue that the series' depictions of trauma aestheticize it in a way that his "generation is particularly vulnerable to".

==== Responses ====
Levinson acknowledged the controversies over the series's content, saying that some parents will be "totally freaked out". Director Frizzell said that the explicit content should help foster a conversation between parents and teenagers. Levinson also said that he hopes the series "opens up a dialogue" due to the "disconnect between parents and teenagers". Zendaya issued a warning both before the series and season 2 premiere about its "deeply emotional subject matter". HBO voiced objections to some sexually graphic scenes, but said it would not interfere with the series' "creative process". The series includes viewer discretion warnings and a website for mental health and other support group resources. The series has reportedly been censored for sexual or violent content in countries like Malaysia, the Philippines, and Singapore. In 2023, Colman Domingo said that he felt the accusations by other series actors of a toxic workplace due to lengthy shoots and the alleged mistreatment of actors, as well as onset chaos during the second season, are overblown.

=== Ratings ===
The series' premiere averaged 577,000 viewers in its time slot, a number that increased to one million after the same-night linear replay and preliminary viewing on HBO Go/Now. The hashtag #EuphoriaHBO trended number one in the US and number three worldwide on Twitter after the premiere. The first season was the most watched of HBO's series in the 18–49 demographic with episodes averaging 6.6 million viewers. Season 2 premiere drew 2.4 million viewers across all HBO platforms, a series high. It also marked the strongest digital premiere night performance for any episode of an HBO series since HBO Max's launch, until it was dethroned by House of the Dragon. At the end of its second season, it became the second-most-watched HBO series since 2004 (behind Game of Thrones), with episodes averaging 16.3 million viewers until it was surpassed by House of the Dragon. According to Variety, Euphoria became the most tweeted television series of the 2020s in the US, with more than 30 million tweets related to the series during the second season, 51% more than during Season 1.

Euphoria : U.S. viewers per episode (thousands)

Season	Episode number								Average
Season	1	2	3	4	5	6	7	8	Average
1	577	574	493	609	579	569	549	530	560
–	236	109	–						173
2	254	279	264	318	353	283	350	625	340
3	356	325	399	387	356	333	308	461	366

Audience measurement performed by Nielsen Media Research

=== Accolades ===
The Academy of Television Arts & Sciences has acknowledged Euphoria at their Primetime Emmy Award ceremonies twenty five times and given the cast and crew nine statues. Its first season received six nominations at the 72nd Primetime Creative Arts Emmy Awards and one 72nd Primetime Emmy Awards, winning Outstanding Lead Actress in a Drama Series (Zendaya for "Made You Look"). The Creative Arts Emmy Awards gave the series the award for Outstanding Makeup for a Single-Camera Series (Non-Prosthetic) (Davy, Kirsten Sage Coleman and Tara Lang Shah for "And Salt the Earth Behind You") and Outstanding Original Music and Lyrics (Labrinth for "All for Us").

Its second season received three nominations at the 74th Primetime Emmy Awards with a repeat win (Zendaya for "Stand Still Like the Hummingbird"). At the 74th Primetime Creative Arts Emmy Awards the series garnered twelve nominations and five wins, Outstanding Guest Actor in a Drama Series (Domingo for "Ruminations: Big and Little Bullys"), Outstanding Choreography for Scripted Programming (Ryan Heffington for "Call Me Irresponsible", "Holding Out for a Hero", "Cheerleader"), Outstanding Cinematography for a Series (One Hour) (Rév for "The Theater and Its Double"), Outstanding Contemporary Makeup (Non-Prosthetic) (Davy, Lang Shah and Alex French for "The Theater and Its Double") and Outstanding Picture Editing for a Drama Series (Laura Zempel, Julio C. Perez IV, Nikola Boyanov and Aaron I. Butler for "The Theater and Its Double").

== See also ==
- List of teen dramas
- List of Primetime Emmy Awards received by HBO
- List of dramatic television series with LGBTQ characters: 2016–2019
