= Katina Danabassis =

Canadian costume designer

- Born: Saskatoon, Canada
- Education: Simon Fraser University
- Occupation: Costume designer

Katina Danabassis is a Canadian Primetime Emmy Award-nominated costume designer.

== Life and career ==
Danabassis is from Saskatoon, Saskatchewan in Canada and attended University of Saskatchewan before taking a year out to travel, later studying anthropology and communication at Simon Fraser University.

In 2020, Danabassis, along with Heidi Bivens and Danielle Baker, was nominated for the Primetime Emmy Award for Outstanding Contemporary Costumes for her work in "The Next Episode" of teen drama television series Euphoria.

After desining for films such as Past Lives (2023), Bodies Bodies Bodies (2022), Materialists (2025), she once again worked with Euphoria-alumna Zendaya in 2026 for her The Drama.

== Awards ==
Year	Body	Category	Nominated work	Result	Ref.
2019	Primetime Emmy Awards	Outstanding Contemporary Costumes	"The Next Episode"	Nominated	
