= Euphoria (Israeli TV series) =

Israeli television series

- Hebrew: אופוריה
- Genre: Teen drama
- Created by: Ron Leshem; Daphna Levin
- Directed by: Daphna Levin
- Starring: Roni Dalumi; Dekel Adin; Amit Erez; Tawfeek Barhom; Avi Mazliah; Roy Nik; Ofer Hayoun; Maor Schwitzer
- Country of origin: Israel
- Original language: Hebrew
- No. of seasons: 1
- No. of episodes: 10

Production
- Cinematography: Shai Goldman
- Running time: 52 minutes
- Production companies: Tedy Productions; Hot

Original release
- Network: Hot 3
- Release: 30 November 2012 – 1 February 2013

Euphoria (Hebrew: אופוריה, Oforia) is an Israeli teen drama television series created by Ron Leshem and Daphna Levin, broadcast on Hot 3 from 30 November 2012 to 1 February 2013. The series follows a group of 17-year-olds dealing with sex, addiction, and loss. Adults appear in the series only rarely, and are always filmed at an angle that obscures their faces. Some of the series' plot is based on real events. Skins has been named as an influence on the creators of the series. The show was met with controversy by Israeli officials, such as Orli Yehezkel of the Cable and Satellite Broadcasting Council, who called for the miniseries to be taken off the air.

== Plot ==
The story follows a group of high school students, as they attempt to cope with an uncertain future through the use of drugs and sex. It is based on the true story of a teenager who was murdered outside of a club, and the series takes place one year after that incident.

== Cast and characters ==
- Roni Daloomi as Hofit, a drug-addicted girl cutter who blames herself for Ra'anan's death.
- Kosta Kaplan as Ra'anan, a 16-year-old murdered the year before the events of the series, based on the 2004 murder of Ra'anan Levy.
- Dekel Adin as Kino, Ra'anan's childhood friend, lives alone while his parents are in Shanghai, has an active imagination and is mostly seen sleeping and in a dream world where he spends his time with Ra'anan in search of "Mirando Al Cielo" in South America.
- Maor Schwitzer as Osher Gimpel, nicknamed "Shamen" (fatty), a self-conscious boy, addicted to pornography, experiencing impotence as a result. He has sex with the house maid and eventually buys a sex doll.
- Dolev Mesika as Deker Eldar, nicknamed "Tzehubon" (yellow), a shy boy who uses his knowledge of chemistry and online instructional videos to produce and sell hallucinogenic drugs. Dolev is in love with Hofit, whom he later rapes when she rejects him. He tries to get into the pilot course in the IDF.
- Roy Nik as Elkana Eldar, Deker's older brother, an IDF defector who spends most of his time having casual sex and giving advice to the others.
- Amit Erez as Noy Cohen, a lonely overweight girl who begins having casual sex with men per Elkana's advice and is subsequently diagnosed as having HIV.
- Avi Mazliah as Uriel, nicknamed "Mastuli" (stoned), an openly gay drifter/couch surfer who has left home and moves from place to place. Per request, he takes Noy's virginity and later stays with Shuki, who tries to perform conversion therapy on him.
- Uriel Geta as Tomer Samigura, nicknamed "Tomeriko", a young drug dealer and Orthodox Jew who later murders Yizhar, Ra'anan's killer, and broadcasts it live on the internet.
- Tawfeek Barhom as Dudu, a 17-year-old Palestinian and aspiring veterinarian, lives in Kino's apartment building.
- Ofer Hayoun as Shuki Samiguara, Tomeriko's religious older brother, tries to convert Mastuli.

== Reception ==
The show received mixed reviews in Israel, and was cancelled after one season. Yedioth Ahronoth critic Einav Schiff partially credits the cancellation to the show's late time slot, in a time before streaming television or delayed watching was common in Israel, making it difficult for Euphoria to find an audience.

== Adaptations ==
In 2019, Euphoria was adapted into an American television series of the same name by Sam Levinson, which premiered on HBO on 16 June 2019. Leshem and Levin joined the production as executive producers.

In 2025, Euphorie, a German adaptation of the series, premiered on RTL+. The series is directed by Antonia Leyla Schmidt and André Szardenings.
