= Javon Walton =

American actor and boxer (born 2006)

- Born: Javon Anthony Walton; July 22, 2006 (age 20); Atlanta, Georgia, U.S.
- Occupations: Actor; professional boxer
- Years active: 2019–present
- Notable work: Euphoria; Utopia; The Umbrella Academy; Samaritan
- Boxing career
- Height: 5 ft 8 in (173 cm)
- Weight: Super featherweight
- Stance: Orthodox

Boxing record
- Total fights: 4
- Wins: 3
- Win by KO: 1
- Draws: 1

Javon Anthony Walton (born July 22, 2006), also known by his ring name Wanna, is an American actor and professional boxer, who is best known for his portrayal of Ashtray in the HBO series Euphoria. After his work in Euphoria, he began working on the television series Utopia, The Umbrella Academy, and the film Samaritan.

== Early life ==
Javon Anthony Walton was born on July 22, 2006, in Atlanta, Georgia, to his father, DJ Walton, a boxing coach and founder of athletics apparel company Onward Athletics, and his mother, Jessica Walton. He has three siblings: a fraternal twin brother, Jaden; an older sister, Jayla; and a younger brother, Daelo.

He was homeschooled for most of his childhood due to his boxing career.

== Acting career ==
In June 2019, Walton appeared in the HBO television series Euphoria as Ashtray, before landing a main role in the Amazon Prime Video streaming series Utopia (2020) as Grant Bishop. In 2021, he appeared in the animated comedy horror film The Addams Family 2 as Pugsley Addams. In 2022, he starred in the Netflix superhero television series The Umbrella Academy, and in the superhero thriller film Samaritan as Sam Cleary. In 2024, he starred in the streaming series Under the Bridge.

== Boxing career ==
=== Most Valuable Promotions ===
In July 2023, Walton signed with YouTuber-turned-professional boxer Jake Paul's promotion Most Valuable Promotions. Walton made his professional boxing debut on December 20, 2023 winning via technical knockout in the first round.

One day after his debut, Most Valuable Promotions announced Walton's global debut on March 2, 2024 on the Amanda Serrano vs. Nina Meinke undercard, at the José Miguel Agrelot Coliseum in San Juan, Puerto Rico. Walton fought Joshua Torres (0–1–1) in a four round bout, which ended in a majority draw.

Walton was originally scheduled to face Erik Hanley (1–1) as the co-feature on Most Valuable Prospects 8 on September 6, 2024, but Walton withdrew due to medical issues. The bout was rescheduled for December 13 as the co-feature on Most Valuable Prospects X at the Caribe Royale Orlando in Orlando, Florida, US. Walton defeated Hanley via majority decision.

Nine months later, Walton faced Anthony Mora (7–4–1) on the Most Valuable Prospects 15 undercard, in which he won via unanimous decision. The bout took place on September 27, 2025 at the Théâtre Saint-Denis in Montreal, Canada.

==== Walton vs. Cejudo ====
On September 15, 2026, Most Valuable Promotions and Misfits Boxing announced that Walton would headline his first event against former UFC Flyweight and Bantamweight Champion Henry Cejudo. Walton is a last-minute replacement for influencer Deen the Great. The bout is scheduled for September 26 at the James L. Knight Center in Miami, Florida. On the night, Walton suffered his first defeat via split decision with the judges scoring the bout 37–39 in favor of Walton, and 39–37, 39–37 in favor of Cejudo.

== Filmography ==
Films
Year	Title	Role	Notes	Ref.
2021	The Addams Family 2	Pugsley Addams (voice)		
2022	Samaritan	Sam Cleary		
2027	Gundam †	TBA	Post-production	

Television
Year	Title	Role	Notes	Ref.
2019–2022	Euphoria	Ashtray	Recurring role (season 1); main role (season 2)	
2020	Utopia	Grant Bishop	Main role	
2022	The Umbrella Academy	Stan	Recurring role (season 3)	
2024	Under the Bridge	Warren Glowatski	Main role	

== Professional boxing record ==
5 fights	3 wins	1 loss
By knockout	1	0
By decision	2	1
Draws	1	

No.	Result	Record	Opponent	Type	Round, time	Date	Location	Notes
5	Loss	3–1–1	Henry Cejudo	SD	4	Sep 26, 2026	James L. Knight Center, Miami, Florida, U.S.	
4	Win	3–0–1	Anthony Mora	UD	6	Sep 27, 2025	Théâtre Saint-Denis, Montreal, Canada	
3	Win	2–0–1	Erik Hanley	MD	4	Dec 13, 2024	Caribe Royale, Orlando, Florida, U.S.	
2	Draw	1–0–1	Joshua Torres	SD	4	Mar 2, 2024	José Miguel Agrelot Coliseum, San Juan, Puerto Rico	
1	Win	1–0	Moises Guzman Almonte	TKO	1 (4), 2:18	Dec 20, 2023	Pabellon de Esgrima, Centro Olimpico, Santo Domingo, Dominican Republic	
