= Beaufort (novel) =

2005 novel by Ron Leshem

- Original Israeli edition
- Author: Ron Leshem
- Original title: Im Yesh Gan Eden (If There Is a heaven)
- Translator: Evan Fallenberg
- Language: Hebrew
- Genre: War novel; first-person narrative
- Publisher: Zmora Bitan (Hebrew); Random House (English)
- Publication date: 2005
- Publication place: Israel
- English publication date: 2007
- Media type: Print
- ISBN: 978-0-553-80682-3 (US edition) 978-0099516729 (British edition)
- OCLC: 162145855
- Dewey Decimal: 892.4/36 22
- LC Class: PJ5055.29.E852 I4213 2008

Beaufort (English translation of אם יש גן עדן; in Hebrew: If There's a Heaven) is the first novel by Israeli author and media professional Ron Leshem. The work was initially published in 2005 and in English translation under this title in 2007. The novel was the basis for the 2007 Academy Award-nominated film Beaufort.

Beaufort is about an Israel Defense Forces unit stationed at the Beaufort Castle, Lebanon post in Southern Lebanon during the South Lebanon conflict. It takes the form of a narrative written by the unit's commander, Liraz Librati, who was the last commander of the Beaufort castle before the Israeli withdrawal in 2000.

The Hebrew original of Beaufort won Israel's 2006 Sapir Prize for Literature and the Yitzhak Sadeh Prize for Military Literature.

== Bibliography ==
- Ron Leshem, Im yesh gan eden. Tel Aviv: Zmora Bitan Publishing (2005)
- Ron Leshem, Beaufort, New York: Random House (2007), translation: Evan Fallenberg
- Ron Leshem, Beaufort, London: Harvill Secker (2008), British English edition
