= Daniel Amsel =

Israeli screenwriter, producer, and development executive

- דניאל אמסל
- Occupations: television producer; studio executive; screenwriter
- Years active: 2012-present

Daniel Amsel is an Israeli screenwriter, producer, and development executive, best known for co-writing the Israeli TV series Euphoria, which was later adapted by HBO into an Emmy Award-winning show with the same name.

== Career ==
In 2012, Amsel co-wrote the Israeli teen drama Euphoria with Ron Leshem, which was later adapted by HBO into a critically acclaimed American series, starring American actress Zendaya. The Israeli series premeried in 2012 and was created by Leshem and Daphan Levin. The adaptation became one of HBO's most-watched shows of the 2010s and 2020s, earning a significant place in popular culture.

In 2018, Leshem and Israeli writer Amit Cohen, who had together created the Israeli psychological thriller series The Gordin Cell, which was remade in the United States as Allegiance, signed a development deal with Red Arrow Studios. The deal created a new label, later named Crossing Ocean. Amsel became head of development for the label.

Amsel co-created and co-wrote, with Leshem, Cohen and Yaron Zilberman, Valley of Tears, a historical drama centered on the Yom Kippur War, which was described as Israel's "biggest-budget TV drama series." The series was produced by London-based WestEnd Films and global rights were purchased by HBO Max. The show premiered in Israel on Kan 11 on October 19, 2020, and then on HBO Max, billed as an "HBO Max original," on November 12, 2020.

In 2020, Amsel co-wrote No Man's Land, a thriller exploring the Syrian civil war through personal and global narratives, created by Leshem, Cohen and Maria Feldman. The series focused on the Women's Protection Units, or YPJ, an elite unite of female Kurdish freedom fighter. The series premiered on Hulu on November 18, 2020, and French television network Arte's streaming service on November 26, 2020. The series, under the name Fertile Crescent, won best series at Series Mania, after which Fremantle boarded as a production company. In November 2022, the series was renewed for a second season.

In 2023, Amsel, Leshem, Cohen and Daniel Shinar created the Israeli drama Red Skies, based on the novel of the same name by Shinar. Amsel served as showrunner on the show, which premiered on Reshet's Channel 13 on June 19, 2023. In February 2023, the series was nominated for the Best Series award at the Series Mania festival in Lille, France. In July 2023, it won "Best Drama Series Award" at the Berlin Festival for Television, as well as awards at the Buenos Aires Film Festival and India International Film Festival. In May 2023, the show was renewed for a second season, before the first season aired.

In January 2023, Amsel co-created Trust No One, with Leshem, Cohen and Israeli writer Ofir Lobel, who wrote and created the thriller series Black Space. The Israeli thriller series debuted at Monte-Carlo Television Festival, where it was nominated for Best Drama, and premiered on Netflix and Channel 12 in November 2023.

That same year, Amsel co-wrote the Israeli television thriller series Traitor, which was created by Leshem and Cohen. The show premiered on Channel 12 on Israel. In September 2023, Keshet International sold the show to Netflix. Amsel was lead writer on the show, which premiered at the Berlinale Series Market, a part of the Berlin International Film Festival focused on television series, where it was a "Series Market Select" show.

In 2024, Amsel, Leshem, Cohen and Israeli comedian Daniel Chen created Bad Boy, based on Chen's four-year stint in a youth detention center in Israel and his current life as a comedian. The series first launched on Israeli cable channel HOT in November 2024 and premiered on Netflix on May 2, 2025, after premiering at the Toronto International Film Festival.
