= Ofra Offer Oren =

Israeli writer (born 1951)

- עופרה עופר אורן
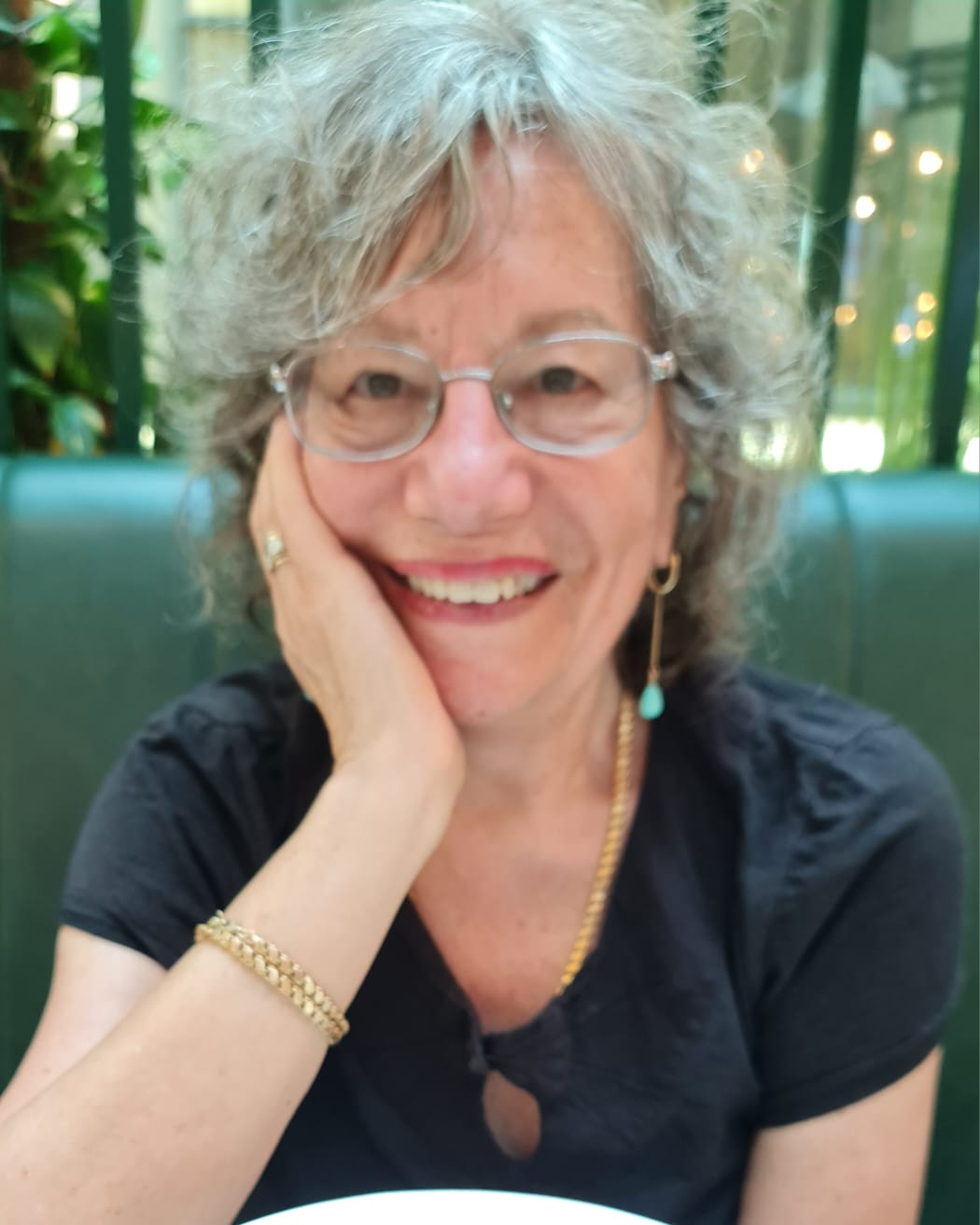
- Ofra Offer Oren, 2023
- Born: Ofra Offer (עופרה עופר); July 4, 1951 (age 75); Tel Aviv, Israel
- Education: Tel Aviv University
- Writing career
- Language: Hebrew
- Genres: novels, short stories, poems
- Notable awards: Prime Minister's Prize for Hebrew Literary Works, (1995); The Ministry of Culture’s Prize for Poets (2019), Sapir Prize for Literature (2023)
- Website: ofra-offer-oren.com

Ofra Offer Oren (Hebrew: עופרה עופר אורן; born July 4, 1951) is an Israeli writer, poet, blogger, translator and editor.

== Biography ==
Offer Oren was born in Tel Aviv and raised until the age of ten in the neighborhood of Jaffa. Later, her family moved to the families’ residence in Tel Nof Airbase. She studied at the school in Kidron (a moshav near the airbase) and later at a high School in Rehovot. From 10th to 12th grade, she attended the Jewish Free School (JFS) in London, where her family was on a mission. After returning to Israel, she served as an officer in the Israeli Air Force.

Offer Oren is a graduate of the English Literature Department at Tel Aviv University, where she also studied cinema and theater. In addition, she obtained a teaching certificate from Tel Aviv University.

For about forty years, Offer Oren taught English, both within the formal education system in Israel (including the prestigious Thelma Yellin School of Arts in Givatayim) and in extracurricular settings. During her teaching career, Offer Oren prepared thousands of students for their English matriculation exams. In 2015, Offer Oren retired from teaching, in part due to her criticism of the English curriculum and the requirements of the Israeli Ministry of Education.

Alongside her teaching career, Offer Oren has been involved, since 1989, in writing, translating, and editing books. She also conducted writing workshops, including at the Beit Ariela public municipal library in Tel Aviv and as part of "A Story is Born" project of the Ministry of Education, in which writers lead writing workshops for students in peripheral communities.

Since retiring from teaching, Offer Oren has focused on writing and, in addition to prose, she began writing poetry. She also operates a very active blog where she posts book reviews and, at times, reviews of movies and television series. In the past, she published posts on topics such as poetry, famous speeches, and the lives of famous female writers.

== Writing ==
Offer Oren began writing during her youth and served as a “young journalist” for the Ma'ariv La'noar youth magazine. She published dozens of articles, essays, and poems during that period, including during her time in London.

To date, Offer Oren has published eleven books, and her stories have been included in three anthologies. Her first book, "Colour Separation", which contains four novellas, was published in 1989.

Her books deal with a variety of topics: "Indirect speech" describes a rupture and collapse of the marriage of a young couple. "Like a Kyte" concentrates on the life and difficulties of a young girl. "The Truths We Never Told" tells us about the side effects and consequences of “the Kasztner affair” on the fate of Hungarian Jews during and after World War II. In the thriller "Murder in the Art School" Offer Oren offers a glimpse at the ambiance, tensions and intrigues in an art school that the murder of its principal reveals. In three of her books ("Shira and Hiroshima", "A Letter to Mother" and "What Happened to Hagar in Eilat?") she describes the consequences of sexual abuse and humiliation.

Offer Oren undoubtedly uses her own personal history in her writing, since one can learn from newspaper interviews with her that she divorced twice, she was a teacher in an art school, her father was a Hungarian Shoah survivor and she even revealed that she had experienced sexual abuse by her father and that she suffered humiliation and physical and verbal abuse from both her father and mother.

Lately, Offer Oren has focused on writing poems. Initially, she wrote poems in Free Verse, and most of these poems were collected in her first poetry book, "What Does Water Know About Thirst". In recent years, Offer Oren has been writing her poems sticking to strict rhyme scheme and meter, and most of her poems are written as sonnets or villanelles. Her poems have been published in daily newspapers and in literary magazines.

In 2023, Offer Oren published the verse novel "What Happened to Hagar in Eilat?", composed of 336 sonnets. For this book Offer Oren received the Sapir Prize for Literature of 2023.

== Translation Work ==
Offer Oren has translated over forty works of prose from English to Hebrew and edited many books. Some of which are works by Isaac Bashevis Singer, Graham Greene, Jack London, Jeffrey Archer, Carol Shields, Jim Crace and Helen Fisher. In addition, she translated series for children and young adults into Hebrew.

In recent years, Offer Oren has also translated hundreds of poems from English to Hebrew while meticulously preserving the rhyme and meter of the original poems. Her translations include the whole sonnets sequences written by William Shakespeare and by Elizabeth Barrett Browning and poems by Michael Drayton, Gerard Manley Hopkins, E. E. Cummings, John Donne, Andrew Marvell, Percy Bysshe Shelley, John Keats, T.S. Eliot, W. H. Auden, William Wordsworth, Alfred Tennyson, Christopher Marlowe, John McCrae, Siegfried Sassoon, and Christina Rossetti (including her book "Sing Song")

== Bibliography ==
- "Colour Separation" (novellas), 1989 [Hafradat Tzva'im]
- "Indirect Speech" (novel), 1990 [Dibur Akif]
- "Like a Kite" (youth), 1992 [Kmo Afifon Menutak]
- "A Cup of Tea with the Queen" (stories), 1994 [Lishtot Teh Im Malkat Angliya]
- "Infidelities and Betrayals" (novel), 2000 [Bgidot, Kol Minei]
- "Shira and Hiroshima" (novel), 2003 [Shira Ve-Hiroshima]
- "A Letter to Mother" [I Feel Good, I Feel Good] (novel), 2006 [Yofi Li, Yofi Li]
- "The truths We Never Told" [Watching] (novel), 2013 [Ma'akav]
- "Murder in the Art School" (thriller), 2017 [Retzach Be-Veit Ha-Sefer Le-Omanuyot]
- "What Does Water Know of Thirst?" (poems), 2018 [Ma Ha-Mayim Yod’im Al Tzama?]
- "What Happened to Hagar in Eilat?" (a novel written in sonnets) 2023 [Ma Kara Le-Hagar Be-Eilat?]

== Awards and honors ==
Offer Oren won the Prime Minister's Prize for Hebrew Literary Works in 1995, the Israeli Ministry of Culture's Prize for Poets in 2019 and Sapir Prize for Literature in 2023.

== Personal life ==
Offer Oren is married for the third time. Her husband, Arie Oren, is a book editor. She has two children: a son, Shahar Tzafrir, from her first marriage and a daughter, Noa Fisher Koren, from her second marriage.

She lives in Kiryat Ono in central Israel.
