= Beaufort (film) =

2007 Israeli war film directed by Joseph Cedar

- Directed by: Joseph Cedar
- Written by: Ron Leshem; Joseph Cedar
- Produced by: Moshe Edery
- Starring: Oshri Cohen; Itay Tiran; Eli Eltonyo; Ohad Knoller; Itay Turgeman
- Cinematography: Ofer Inov
- Edited by: Zohar M. Sela
- Music by: Ishai Adar
- Distributed by: United King Films
- Release dates: 14 February 2007 (Berlin International Film Festival); 8 March 2007 (Israel)
- Running time: 125 minutes
- Country: Israel
- Language: Hebrew

Beaufort (Hebrew: בופור Bufor) is a 2007 Israeli war film. The film was directed by Joseph Cedar and was co-written by Cedar and Ron Leshem, based on Leshem's 2005 novel.

The film takes place in the year 2000, the year of the IDF withdrawal from the Israeli Security Zone in southern Lebanon. It chronicles the daily routine of a group of soldiers positioned at the 12th-century Crusader stronghold of Beaufort Castle, their feelings and their fears, and explores their moral dilemmas in the days preceding the withdrawal and end of the 18-year of Israeli occupation of South of Lebanon.

== Plot ==
The film portrays the final months of the Israel Defense Forces (IDF) presence in Lebanon's security zone. Ziv Paran, a soldier in the bomb disposal unit, joins an outpost mission named "Operation Cabinet" to deal with a Hezbollah explosive blocking convoy routes. He meets outpost commander Liraz and sergeant major Oshri. The outpost endures relentless Hezbollah mortar attacks, prompting constant readiness.

During Operation Cabinet, Ziv dies in an explosion, sparking confusion over the necessity of the operation. As IDF withdrawal preparations begin, Liraz resists accepting it, symbolized by his refusal to evacuate non-essential equipment and the outpost dog, Nemruska.

Oshri's imminent release from the IDF prompts emotional farewells. However, before departing, he's injured during a mortar attack. Zitlawi's death intensifies tensions. Liraz clashes with superiors over the withdrawal and Hezbollah threats.

The psychological toll of withdrawal mounts as soldiers struggle with guard duties. Shpitzer's death reinforces the impending danger. With withdrawal orders imminent, soldiers dismantle the outpost, leaving a skeletal force behind. Liraz wrestles with leaving the hill, emotionally attached to its significance.

As the final withdrawal approaches, the outpost is rigged to explode. Last-minute delays heighten tensions. Liraz's emotional turmoil surfaces, fearing abandoning the hill. Amid darkness and uncertainty, soldiers grapple with their fate.

As the outpost detonates, symbolizing the end of an era, emotions overflow. Returning to Israel, soldiers confront the surreal reality of the withdrawal's completion, allowing themselves to finally express their emotions.

== Cast ==
| Actor | Role |
|---|---|
| Oshri Cohen | Lieutenant Liraz "Erez" Librati, bunker commander |
| Eli Eltonyo | Oshri, company first sergeant |
| Itay Turgeman | Sergeant Tomer Zitlaui |
| Ohad Knoller | Lieutenant Ziv Faran, bomb disposal officer |
| Daniel Bruk | Pavel |
| Ygal Reznik | Robbie |
| Itay Szor | Emilio |
| Itay Tiran | Idan Koris, emergency medical technician |
| Arthur Faradjev | Yonatan Shpitzer |
| Gal Friedman | Belis |
| Zohar Strauss | Rossman |
| Alon Aboutboul | Brigadier-General Kimchi, division commander |
| Danni Zahavi | Captain Meir, engineer officer |
| Nevo Kimchi | Avishai |
| Hannan Yishai | Nadav |
| Gideon Levy | Himself |

== Production ==
The film's director, himself an IDF veteran who was stationed in Lebanon during the first Lebanon war, uses the stone walls of Beaufort castle as a symbol of the futility and endlessness of war. The film was shot during the spring of 2006 at Nimrod Fortress, a similar mountaintop fort in the Golan Heights. Cedar said he was influenced by the film Das Boot, and the World War I "bunker films", when creating the tunnels and mazes of the Beaufort. He also said that Paths of Glory was a heavy influence, specifically on the bomb-disarming mission scene. Useful historical information for understanding the movie can be found in the article on the original capture of Beaufort in 1982 by the Israeli army.

Filming was completed in June, just a month before the second war in Lebanon broke out.

== Reception ==
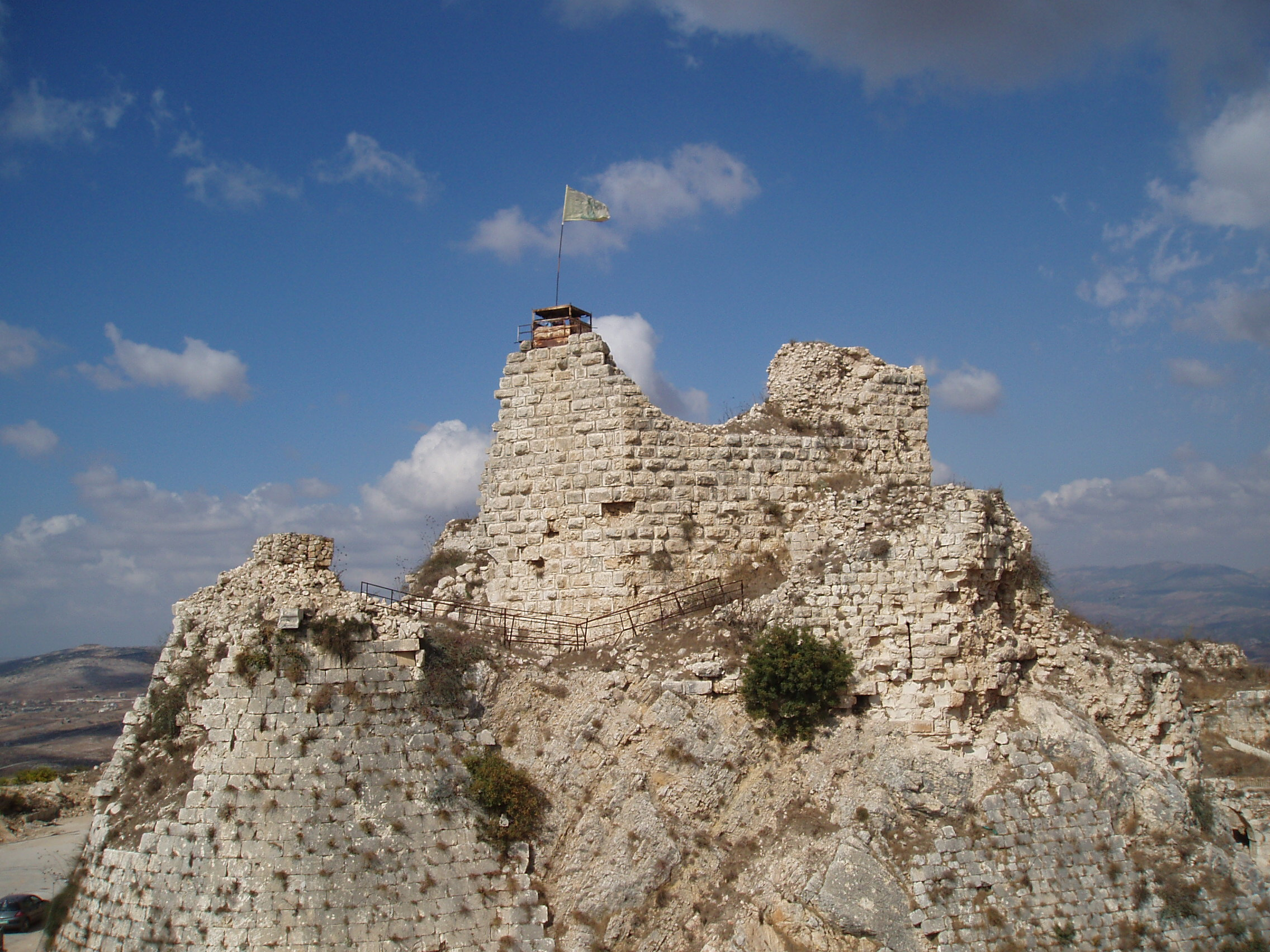
Beaufort Castle in Lebanon.

=== Critical ===
Beaufort was generally well received by critics. As of 21 October 2020, the review aggregator Rotten Tomatoes reported that 85% of critics gave the film positive reviews, based on 53 reviews, and an average rating of 7.03/10. The website's critical consensus states, "Beaufort is a deeply observant and meditative war film, masterfully rendered by director Joseph Cedar".

Lisa Schwarzbaum of Entertainment Weekly gave it an A, calling it "a movie of tremendous power—nerve-racking, astute, and neutral enough to apply to all soldiers, in all wars, everywhere". A. O. Scott of The New York Times wrote: "Even if it does not entirely rise above cliché, 'Beaufort' has an earnest, sober intelligence that makes it hard to shake. It suggests that, for those who fight, the futility of war is inseparable from its nobility." The film's concept and look were compared to those of Letters from Iwo Jima.

The film gained mostly very positive reviews in Israel; several reviewers called it one of the best Israeli films ever. Hannah Brown of The Jerusalem Post called it the first great Israeli war film. The less positive reviews claimed that the film lacks a direct confrontation with its issues or criticism.

Effi Eitam, an Israeli war hero who was an Israel Defense Forces high commander in Lebanon (he was replaced by Moshe Kaplinsky several months before the withdrawal), said that the film "successfully depicts, in great detail, the military experience". Eitam also criticized the creators for showing only the last days of the fighting and not telling the full story of the 18 years of Israeli fighting in Lebanon ("Whoever watches this movie is likely to think that this entire war was just a matter of inane duck shooting... That's not how we operated").

Linda Barnard of the Toronto Star notes that "Liraz can't protect his men and is visibly diminished each time they face danger and death." As well, he "faces his last order [to destroy the fort] with resolve mixed with bitterness and anger over the useless sacrifice of those who died to defend what the army is about to wipe out". Andrea Gronvall of the Chicago Reader calls it a "blistering antiwar film"; she states that "the absurdity and terrors of their situation are compounded when the squad receives orders to evacuate and blow up its bunker—something the enemy has been trying to do all along."

Jonathan Richards notes that the film has a "slow and contemplative [approach], punctuated by shocking bursts of explosive violence". He states that "at a little over two hours, [the film] drags at times with its static, claustrophobic setting and thin plot," but nevertheless states that "it makes an urgent case for the futility of most wars, which serve immediate political goals that afterward don’t seem terribly important." He states that "at its core[,] Beaufort is about the heroism of withdrawal, the guts it takes to reject the militaristic mindset that believes any retreat is a weakness."

=== Commercial ===
Beaufort is one of the most successful Israeli films of the 2000s. It made more than US$500,000 in the first 3 weeks of its release in the Israeli market, a substantial amount for a domestic Israeli film. Since its release, it was viewed by over 300,000 viewers in Israel.

=== Awards and nominations ===
Cedar won the Silver Bear in the Berlin International Film Festival for directing Beaufort, and the film was also nominated for the Academy Award for Best Foreign Language Film, the first such nomination for an Israeli film since Beyond the Walls (1984) and the seventh overall. In Israel it won 4 Ophir Awards—Best Cinematography, Best Film Editing, Best Artistic Design and Best Soundtrack. It was also nominated for Best Picture, although the award went to The Band's Visit, making Beaufort the first film directed by Cedar to not win this award. The Band's Visit's status as a foreign language film in the Academy Awards was rejected because it contains over 50% dialogue in English, which caused the runner-up Beaufort to become Israel's submission instead.

== Controversies ==
The casting has raised serious public criticism in Israel, especially from families of slain soldiers and war veterans, given the fact that some of the actors did not serve in the IDF (military service is compulsory in Israel, although some people are exempt). Cedar commented that the actors had to spend a month at an actual outpost preparing for their roles, and "Israel may be the only place where actors are expected to have actual combat experience when playing soldiers in a movie."

It was rumored that it was the filmmakers of Beaufort who brought to the Academy's attention the ineligibility, on language grounds, of The Band's Visit. Beaufort's makers denied this rumor.

== See also ==
- South Lebanon conflict
