= Sapir Prize =

Israeli prize for literature in Hebrew

- Awarded for: Literary work published in Israel
- Country: Israel
- Presented by: Mifal HaPayis
- First award: 2000; 26 years ago
- Website: Sapir Prize (in Hebrew)

The Sapir Prize for Literature of Israel is an annual literary award presented for a work of literature in the Hebrew language. The prize is awarded by Mifal HaPayis (Israel's state lottery), and is a part of the organization's cultural initiatives. It bears the name of the late Pinhas Sapir, a former Finance Minister of Israel, and was first awarded in 2000.

== Prize money ==
The Sapir Prize, based on the British Man Booker Prize, is the most lucrative literary prize awarded in Israel. Of five shortlisted titles, the winning author receives 150,000 NIS (roughly 39,000 USD), and the four runners-up each receive 40,000 NIS. For the year 2019, a new award will be granted for a debut work. Up to three candidates will receive a prize of 20,000 NIS, with the winner receiving 40,000 NIS.

== Prize rules ==
The group of judges for the prize is composed of prominent literary figures, whose names are kept confidential until the prize winner is named. Some of these judges are replaced from year to year.

The judges first select five books published during the previous year as final contestants for the prize. These books are selected from a list of books provided by the major publishing houses. After a number of weeks, a winner is chosen from these five books and is publicised during Israel's Hebrew Book Week.

The five finalist authors participate in a round of literary get-togethers with readers throughout Israel with the backing of Israel's state lottery. In 2005, the state lottery ran a competition allowing readers to bet on the winner of the prize; the first 30 people to guess the winner correctly received the five finalist books.

In 2003, author Etgar Keret's book of short stories Anihu was disqualified from competing for the prize after it was discovered that the regulations required all competing books to run at least 60,000 words. This rule has since been abolished.

In 2006, in response to many petitions, the prize's management decided to open up the competition to works published in the previous five years which had been translated into Hebrew from other languages. All competing authors must be Israeli citizens. The change was intended to allow Israeli authors writing in Russian, Arabic, English, and additional languages to compete. These authors can compete either in the normal prize track, or in a separate track specifically for translated works, from which only one work is selected.

Prizewinners are given funding to have their work translated into Arabic and one other foreign language.

The prize's awarding ceremony is broadcast every year on television during Israel's Hebrew Book Week.

In 2015 the prize rules were changed, only residents of Israel are eligible.

== Criticism ==
The Sapir Prize has been criticized on the grounds that it is given to bestsellers. Some of the country's most important writers refuse to submit their candidacy for it, including Meir Shalev, Aharon Appelfeld, A.B. Yehoshua and Amos Oz.

In 2014, for the first time, the award was won by a writer (Reuven Namdar) living outside Israel. Thereafter, it was decided that only candidates resident in Israel would be eligible to submit their works for the prize. Critics of this decision have said that for a language to isolate itself, and to restrict its literature to local concerns, is to stifle it. However, others have argued that literary funding is in short supply in Israel, and would be best directed at local authors rather than those living more comfortably abroad.

== Winners ==
- 2024: Yossi Avni-Levy, Three Days in Summer (Kinneret Zmora Dvir)
- 2023: Ofra Offer Oren, What Happened to Hagar in Eilat?
- 2022: Orit Ilan, Sister to the Pleiades
- 2021: Hila Blum, How to Love Your Daughter
- 2020: Sami Berdugo, Donkey
- 2019: Ilana Bernstein, Tomorrow We’ll Go to The Amusement Park
- 2018: Etgar Keret, Fly Already
- 2017: Esther Peled, Widely Open Underneath
- 2016: Michal Ben-Naftali, The Teacher
- 2015: Orly Castel-Bloom, An Egyptian Novel
- 2014: Reuven Namdar, The Ruined House
- 2013: Noa Yedlin, בעלת הבית
- 2012: Shimon Adaf, Mox Nox
- 2011: Haggai Linik, Prompter Needed
- 2010: Yoram Kaniuk, 1948
- 2009: The prize was annulled this year after it was initially awarded to Alon Hilu for House of Dajani.
- 2008: Zvi Yanai, שלך, סנדר
- 2007: Sara Shilo, The Falafel King is Dead
- 2006: Ron Leshem, Beaufort
- 2005: Alona Frankel, Girl
- 2004: Dan Tsalka, Tsalka's ABC
- 2003: Amir Gutfreund, אמיר גוטפרוינד (Ahuzot HaHof)
- 2002: Gail Hareven, The Confessions of Noa Weber
- 2001: David Grossman, Someone to Run With
- 2000: Haim Sabato, Adjusting Sights

== See also ==
=== Individual recipients of prize ===
- Ayelet Gundar-Goshen
