= Bad Boy (Israeli TV series) =

Israeli television series

- ילד רע
- Genre: Biography, Drama, Crime fiction
- Created by: Ron Leshem, Daniel Chen
- Directed by: Hagar Ben-Asher
- Country of origin: Israel
- Original language: Hebrew
- No. of seasons: 1
- No. of episodes: 8

Original release
- Network: Hot
- Release: November 2024

Bad Boy (Hebrew: ילד רע) is an Israeli drama series created by Ron Leshem, Daniel Amsel, Hagar Ben-Asher and comedian Daniel Chen. The series first launched on Israeli cable channel Hot in November 2024 and premiered on Netflix on May 2, 2025. The show stars Chen as Dean Shaiman and is a retelling of his four years in a youth detention center in Israel and his current life as a comedian.

== Premise ==
The eight-episode series switches back and forth in time between Dean's stint in a juvenile detention center, when he was 13 years old, and the present, where Dean is a successful comic haunted by his past. While in jail, Dean bonds with Zoro, a teenage prisoner serving time for murder.

The series is based on the real life story of Chen, who was born in Tel Aviv and served multiple sentences at Ofek Prison when he was a teenager. Dean Shaiman is the birth name of Daniel Chen, who plays the adult version himself in the show. Chen became a successful stand-up comedian in adulthood, as well as a television writer and actor.

== Cast ==
=== Main ===
- Daniel Chen as Dean Shaiman
  - Guy Menaster as the teenage Dean Shaiman
- Havtamo Farda as Zion Zoro, Dean's friend in prison
- Neta Plotnik as Tamara Sheyman, Dean's mother
- Liraz Chamami as Heli, the prison warden

=== Supporting ===
- Bat-Chen Sabag as Keren
- Ishay Lalosh as Feddie Soosan
- Amjad Shawa as Anhaisy

Most cast members were not professional actors and were acting for the first time in the series.

== Production ==
Bad Boy was the first international co-production deal struck by businessman Peter Chernin's The North Road Company, which served as co-studio alongside Israeli studio Sipur, while HOT and Tedy Productions served as producers.

=== Writing ===
Leshem, who was formally an investigative journalist, incorporated elements into the series from a story he had written earlier in his career about teenage criminal imprisoned together. Leshem's story focused on children who are born in prison, many of whom return to prison as teenagers. Leshem met Chen during his career as a reporter, when he embedded himself at Ofek Prison for two weeks. He also met real-life versions of other characters who make it into the show, such as Freddie Soosan, played by Ishay Laloosh.

Leshem wrote the series with Ben-Asher, Chen, Amsel, Moshe Malka and Amit Cohen.

=== Filming ===
The show was shot at the Ayalon Prison in Ramla, which is a fully operational prison, at a prison Tel Mond that was not operational and at a set created inside the Ramat Gan Tzofim building.

== Release ==
Bad Boy premiered at the Toronto International Film Festival in September 2023. It was first launched on Israel's HOT cable channel in November 2024. Netflix then acquired global streaming rights and launched the series on May 2, 2025.

As of December 2024, Netflix is working on an American remake of Bad Boy. In November 2025, HOT ordered a second season of the series.

== Reception ==
=== Israel ===
Bad Boy won seven awards at the Awards of the Israeli Television Academy, including Best Drama, Best Directing and Best Writing.

=== International ===
Bad Boy was nominated for Best Drama Series at the 53rd International Emmy Awards in 2025.
