= Dan Tsalka =

Polish-born Israeli writer

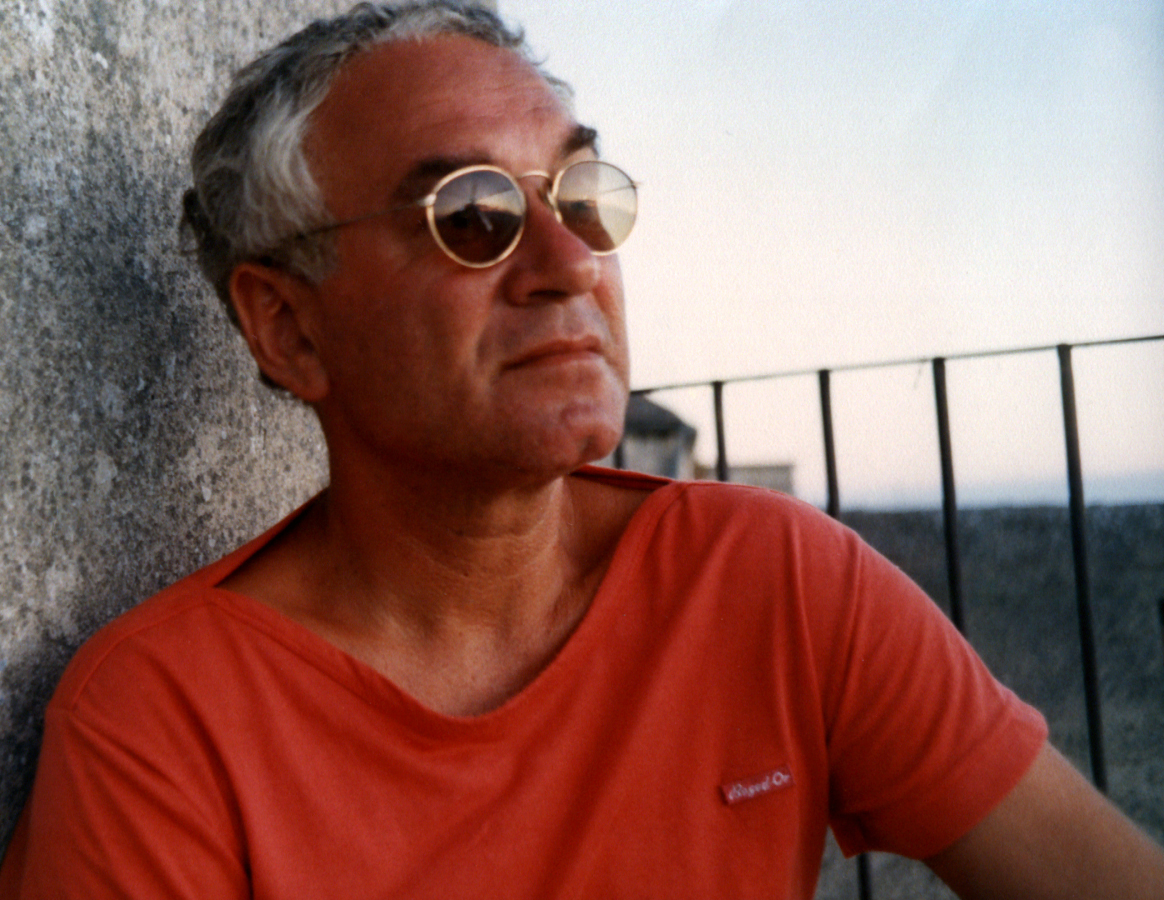
Dan Tsalka in 1987

Dan Tsalka (Hebrew: דן צלקה; 1936-June 15, 2005) was an Israeli writer.

== Biography ==
Dan Tsalka was born in 1936 in Warsaw. In World War II his family fled to the Soviet Union, where they lived in Siberia and then Kazakhstan. At the close of the war, when he was ten, he returned with his family to Poland, to the city of Wrocław. He studied humanities at the city's university, engaging in boxing, an activity that appeared later in the novel Gloves.

In 1957 he immigrated to Israel in the "Gomułka Aliyah". He changed his name from Mietek to Dan, a name his sister suggested during their stay in an immigrant absorption camp (maabara) in Yavne. After studying Hebrew at Kibbutz Hatzor, he enlisted in the Israel Defense Forces and served in the armored corps. After his discharge he studied philosophy and history at Tel-Aviv University. He continued his studies in France, also residing for a time in the Netherlands, the United Kingdom, and Italy.

In 1967 he published his first novel Dr. Barkel. He was the editor of Masa, the literary supplement of the newspaper Lemerkhav, and engaged in additional editing and translation.

In 2000 he made a trip to Morocco with a friend, as he described in the book Morocco: Travel Notes.

He lived in Tel Aviv with his wife Aviva. He died on June 15, 2005, at the age of 69 from cancer.

== Awards ==
He won many Israeli literature awards, including:

- In 1976, the Brenner Prize;
- In 1972, 1991 and 1997, the Hayetzira Prize;
- In 1992, the Alterman Prize for the novel A Thousand Hearts;
- In 1994, the ACUM Prize for Clouds and Loose Pages Bound
- In 2000, the ACUM Prize for lifetime achievement;
- In 2004, the Sapir Prize for Tsalka's ABC.

== Selected works ==
- Dr. Barkel (1967)
- Philip Arbes (1977)
- The Third Voyage of the Aldebaran [Ha-Masa Shel Ha-Aldebaran] (1979)—science fiction for youth.
- Gloves [Kfafot] (1982)
- A Thousand Hearts [Elef Levavot] (1991)
- On the Road to Aleppo: A Book of Stories (1999): selected stories in English translation, published in Ra'annana by Even Hoshen.
- The War Between the Children of the Earth and the Children of the Pit [Milhemet Bnei Eretz Bivnei Shahat] (1993): science fiction for youth.
- Clouds [Ananim] (1994)
- Loose Pages Bound [Dappim Mehudakim Be-Atav] (1993): essays.
- Morocco: Travel Notes [Marocco: Yoman Masa] (2001)
- Under the Sign of the Lotus [Be-Siman Ha-Lotus] (2002)
- Tsalka's ABC [Sefer Ha-Alef-Bet] (2003): autobiographical notes—a personal lexicon, arranged in alphabetical order, of events in the life of the author.
