= The Ruined House =

2014 Hebrew language novel set in New York City

First edition (publ. Kineret-Zmura-Bitan)

The Ruined House (Hebrew: הבית אשר נחרב, lit. The House that was Destroyed) is an originally Hebrew language book by Reuven Namdar written and set in New York City. The book was the 2014 winner of the Sapir Prize.
