= Annie Shapero =

Australian-British actress

- Born: Annie Shapero; Australia
- Education: Royal Melbourne Institute of Technology
- Occupation: Actor
- Years active: 2019–present

Annie Shapero is an Australian-British actress. She is known for her work in television, notably for the role of Alysanne Blackwood in House of the Dragon.

== Early life and education ==
Shapero trained as a dancer from the years 2011 to 2014, after which she received a Victorian Certificate of Education. In 2015, she worked full-time as a dancer at Patrick Studios Australia, before also pursuing various acting workshops at the 16th Street Actor's Studio. She worked as a dancer in two dance shows in the years 2016 and 2017.

In 2023, Shapero received a Bachelors in Screen and Media from the Royal Melbourne Institute of Technology.

== Career ==
In 2022, Shapero portrayed Jenny Horowitz in Series Mania award-winning Israeli television show Red Skies.

In 2023, Shapero portrayed Nora Hayden in FX show The Border, a drama based on the third book in the Cartel series by American author Don Winslow.

In 2025, Shapero portrayed Anna Moore The Narrow Road to the Deep North, a miniseries based on the Booker Prize-winning australian novel of the same name.

In 2026, Shapero joined the third season of HBO's House of the Dragon, portraying Alysanne Blackwood, a character from George R. R. Martin's Fire & Blood novel. Her casting received media attention. Shapero also played the role of Melissa in the Australian psychological horror film Saccharine. In the same year, Shapero was also cast in a recurring role in Vought Rising, an upcoming spin-off of The Boys.

== Filmography ==
Key
†	Denotes television productions that have not yet been released

Television roles
Year	Title	Role	Notes
2017	Unverified	Charlotte	6 episodes
2020	Silence		Pilot episode
2020	User Not Found	Sarah	1 episode
2022	Red Skies	Jenny Horowitz	8 episodes
2023	The Border	Nora Hayden	
2024	The Narrow Road to the Deep North	Anna Moore	1 episode
2026	House of the Dragon	Alysanne Blackwood	5 episodes
2027	Vought Rising †		

Film roles
Year	Title	Role	Notes
2016	Ritual	Helen	Short film
2019	Li Na: My Life	Eva	Autobiographical film on the life of Li Na.
2021	Ragdolls	Lucy	Short film
2022	Soirée	Imogen	
2022	You'll Probably Change Your Mind	Producer	
2026	Saccharine	Melissa	

Music video
Year	Title	Artist(s)	Role
2019	"Alive"	N.Y.C.K.	Lead
2022	"Beyond the Valley"		Runner
2022	"Grapevine Gathering"		Runner

== Theatre ==
Stage roles
Year	Title	Role	Notes
2016	Signs of the Zodiac	Dancer	
2017	The Ringmaster	Dancer	
2019	Punk Rock	Tanya Gleeson	Patalog Theatre Company
2020	Campaign and Afterplays	Actor	Company 16
2022	The Last Train to Madelaine	Madeleine	Patalog Theatre Company, performed at Fortyfivedownstairs, Melbourne
2022	Heroes of the Fourth Turning	Teresa	Red Stitch Theatre Company
2022	Sing	Actor	Workshop performance, Malthouse Theatre Company, Melbourne
