= Shlomi Eldar =

Israeli television journalist (born 1957)

- שלומי אלדר
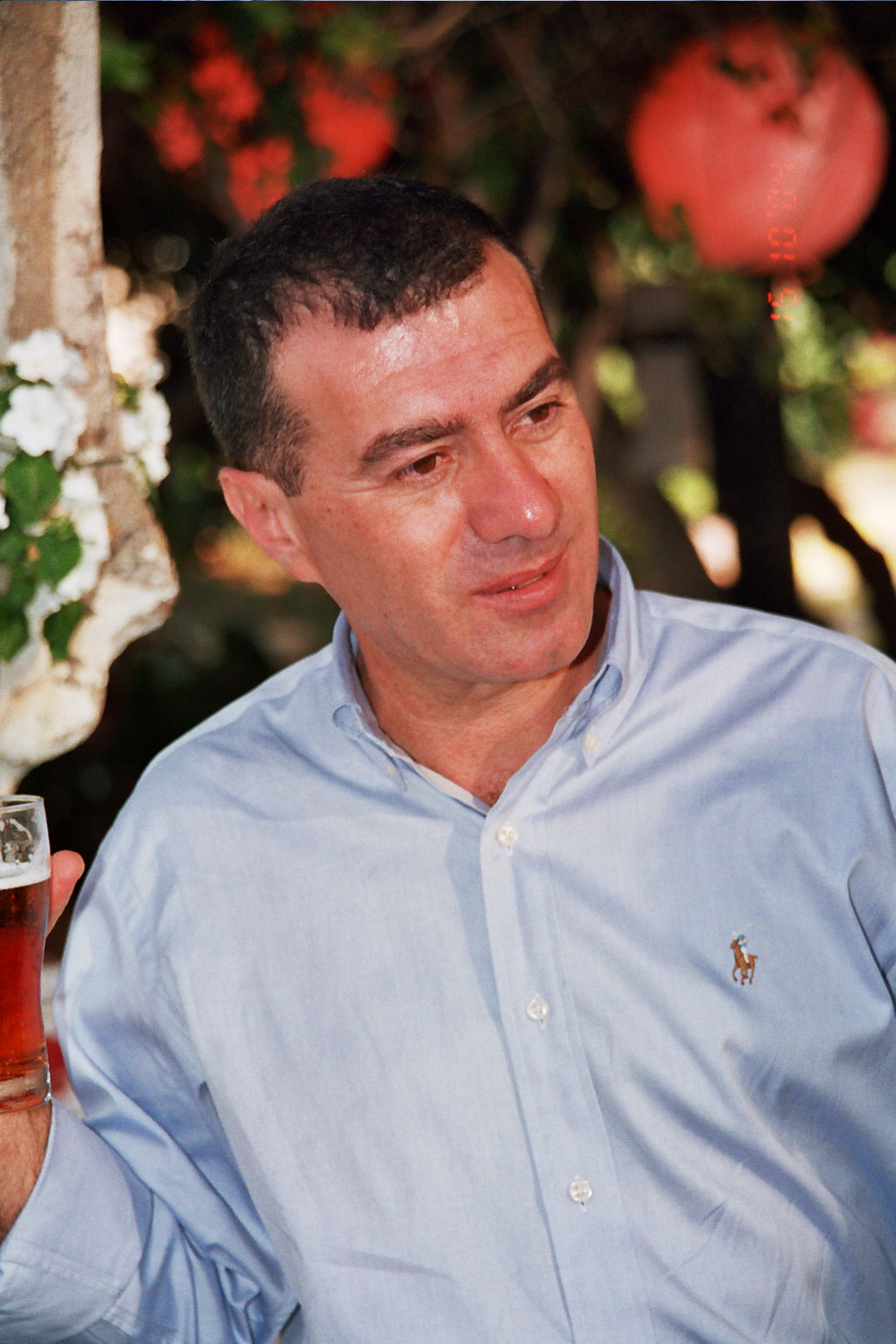
- Born: February 11, 1957 (age 69); Herzliya
- Education: Hebrew University of Jerusalem
- Children: 5
- Awards: Sokolov Award
- Presenting career
- Station: News 13
- Country: Israel

Shlomi Eldar (Hebrew: שלומי אלדר; born February 11, 1957) is an Israeli television journalist and film maker. He served as a reporter and editor for Channel 1 between 1990 and 2003 and a reporter for News 10 on Gaza Strip affairs from 2003 to November 2012.

== Biography ==
Eldar began his career as a radio broadcaster on "Reshet Gimel." In 1990 Eldar began working as a journalist for Channel 1 as a reporter for educational affairs. Shortly afterward, he was transferred to the position of South correspondent, focusing on events happening in Southern Israel. Fluent in Arabic, Eldar began his involvement in Palestinian affairs when he was sent to cover the Oslo accords. He was later transferred to work as a political reporter and correspondent for special affairs.

== Career ==
As a correspondent Eldar interviewed important figures in the Israeli–Palestinian conflict such as Israeli Prime Ministers Shimon Peres and Yitshak Rabin, and was the first Israeli journalist to interview PLO president Yasser Arafat. In 2006, after Hamas won the 2006 Palestinian legislative election, Eldar interviewed Hamas leader Ismail Haniyeh for his only interview ever to an Israeli news organization.

In 1999 Eldar covered the earthquake in Izmit. Eldar sat for over three days watching the Home Front Command attempting to find survivors and broadcast live the rescue of Israeli 9-year-old Shiran Franco. This broadcast became one of the most well-known broadcasts in Israel's history.

In 2003 Eldar moved to the newly founded Channel 10. In his first days in the channel, he was sent to Iraq after the end of the Iraq War and the subsequent capture of Saddam Hussein to film his first documentary, "Passing by Baghdad". In the film, Eldar found the house of his parents before their Aliyah to Israel in Operation Ezra and Nehemiah.

In 2004 Eldar survived a kidnapping attempt by Hamas.

In 2005 Yedioth Books published his book "Eyeless in Gaza". The book is his journalistic and personal journey, spanning two decades in the Gaza Strip, between intifadas, the peace process, the collapse of the Oslo Accords, Israel's withdrawal from Gaza, and the rise of Hamas.

During his time as a reporter in Gaza, Eldar faced hostilities with the IDF, and criticized the army's actions in the Palestinian territories, among other things, when he reported on the demolition of houses in Operation Rainbow, Eldar attempted to prove that an IDF shell caused the death of seven members of the Raliya family on the Gaza coast.

In December 2008 Eldar entered the Gaza strip through a ship sailing from Cyprus, despite the ban on Israelis to enter the Gaza strip after the withdrawal. Upon his reentry to Israel, he was detained for questioning and released with a warning. In later interviews, Eldar claimed that Prime Minister Ehud Olmert has told friends of Eldar that Israel delayed the 2008-2009 Gaza War in fear of Eldar's safety.

In Eldar's film "Precious life", Eldar stated that he is convinced that his colleague, a Palestinian cameraman, was shot by IDF soldiers that aimed at Eldar.

In 2009, during the Gaza War, Eldar sat on a panel when he received a call from his friend, Dr. Izzeldin Abuelaish after Israeli shells fell on Dr Abuelaish's family home in Gaza, killing three of his young daughters and their cousin. Eldar picked up the call and put him on speaker for viewers to hear Dr. Abuelaish's cries. This widely circulated video has been cited as a major reason for a ceasefire and end to the war.

In 2012 Eldar released his book, Getting to Know Hamas, in which he revealed the channel of communication between Khaled Mashal, the leader of Hamas, and Israeli Prime Minister Ehud Olmert, through the mediation of a foreign diplomat and Shin Bet chief Yuval Diskin. The book won the Yitzhak Sade Award for military literature.

In 2012 Eldar announced his resignation from Channel 10.

In 2013 Eldar relocated to the United States, and served as researcher for Wilson Center and a lecturer at New York University and the University of Maryland.

In 2015 Eldar participated in the Israeli reality TV show MasterChef VIP.

In 2022 Eldar returned to Israel.

In 2023 after the outbreak of Gaza war, Eldar returned to Channel 13 (previously named Channel 10) as a correspondent.

In 2024 Eldar travelled to Cairo to meet wealthy Palestinian refugees. On this trip, Eldar revealed that Hamas divided Israel into territories and offered senior Palestinian officials goverenence of terroritories of Israel, believing that post October 7 Israel would be destroyed, as well as revealing Hamas's framework of expelling Jews out of the region after the takeover of Israel.

In June 2024 Eldar published "Hamas: From a Charity Movement to War Criminals". The book is an updated and extended edition of his previous book "Getting to Know Hamas". The book dives into Prime Minister's Netanyahu policy of propping up Hamas and weakening the Palestinian Authority, after his return to the position of Prime Minister in the 2009 elections, and especially after the 2014 war in the Gaza Strip. Eldar argues that the policy did not stem from security or military considerations, but political ones. Eldar hosts a popular podcast with tens of thousands of listeners (The Shlomi Eldar Podcast), in which he invites a wide range of guests from the fields of politics, security, cinema, and music. In interviews, Eldar says that he invites to the studio people he finds interesting and who spark his curiosity.

In 2026, Eldar released a new book, "Kidnapped: 843 Days of Abandonment" which covers the timeline and negotiations over releasing the hostages. The book claims Benjamin Netanyahu was personally alerted by the president of the United Arab Emirates that Hamas was planning a large-scale offensive against Israel a week before its 7 October 2023 attack, but did not act on the warning. Netanyahu has denied all the assertions in the book, and the Likud has announced they plan to sue Eldar and Haaretz newspaper for defamation.

== Films ==
Precious Life

In 2010 Eldar released "Precious Life" a documentary describing the struggle of an Israeli paediatrician and a Palestinian mother as they try to get treatment for her baby who suffers from an incurable genetic disease, as the 2008–2009 war was waging. The film won a commendation at the Jerusalem Film Festival and was screened later that year at the Toronto International Film Festival, the Telluride Film Festival, and the Leipzig Film Festival. In September 2010, the film won the Ophir Award for the best documentary film and was short listed for the Oscars. American columnist Tom Friedman wrote an op-ed praising the film. HBO acquired the rights to screen Precious Life.

Foreign Land

In 2017 Eldar's documentary Foreign Land won the Best Documentary Film award at the Haifa Film Festival. In 2018, the film won the Ophir Award for best documentary. In his acceptance speech, Eldar stated: "I started shooting Foreign Land six years ago, a long time in terms of a film, a chapter in the life of a country. Six years ago, no one thought of going up to courts with a D-9, artists were not persecuted and threatened, bereaved parents were not reprimanded, the Arabs were not "heading to the polling stations in droves" (in reference to a campaign speech by Netanyahu prior to the 2015 election), annexation was a perverted idea of a fringe extreme right, desecularization of Israel was not a word in our lexicon, and there was no nation state law that legally defined Arabs, Druze and Circassians minorities as second-class citizens." The film was purchased for broadcast by Kan 11, the Israeli Public Broadcasting network, and provoked the protest of Culture Minister Miri Regev, who argued there was no place to broadcast a film criticizing Israel on a public television channel.

Riding With a Spy

In 2021 Eldar released the film Riding with a spy. The film was shot during a coast-to-coast trip in the United States with Anat Kamm, who was convicted of aggravated espionage after leaking secret documents to Haaretz journalist Uri Blau, and included a meeting between Kamm and Pentagon Papers whistleblower Daniel Ellsberg. The film was accepted into the official competition of the Dokaviv Festival and was nominated for the Ophir Award for 2021. Following the public response the film evoked, Kamm received a job offer from Haaretz and was appointed editor of the newspaper's opinion section.

Dune & Ashes

In 2024 Eldar released his fourth documentary film "Duns & Ashes", a story about Kibbutz Holit, which was invaded by Hamas militants on October 7. The Israeli army arrived at the kibbutz, more than ten hours after the attack began. Seventeen people were murdered, two infants were kidnapped and two hostages were taken to Gaza by Hamas. But while other border towns had their stories told in Israel and around the world, the Holit massacre remained unknown to many.

== Awards and honours ==
In 2007 he won the Sokolov prize for his coverage of Gaza.

In 2014 he won the Yitshak Sadeh military literature prize for his book "Getting to Know Hamas".

Eldar's films have been nominated three times for an Ophir Award, and won twice for best documentary.
