= 1948 (novel) =

2010 Israeli novel

1948 (Hebrew: תש"ח, Tasha"h) (Note: תש"ח stands for year of 5708 of Hebrew calendar, which approximately corresponds to 1977/1978; see fr:5708 (année hébraïque) for a graphical representation) is a 2010 fictionalized autobiographical novel by Israeli writer Yoram Kaniuk. In 2012 it was translated into English by Anthony Berris. It is based on author's teenage experience of a Palmach fighter in the Harel Brigade during the 1948 Palestine war, known as the War of Independence in Israel.

It was described as "the coming-of-age story that blurs the boundaries between heroism and futility, historical injustice and historical justice."

This hard to read book does not attempt to give a historical narrative, rather the personal experiences of the war, sometimes against its official portrayal. For example, Kaniuk describes how they shot an Arab child after they found their fellow soldier hanged on a tree. Or another, an anticlimactic episode when to a group of soldiers tired to death lying shivering of cold by a dead body came a Palmach "politruk" who told them about the establishment of the state of Israel, and forced them to dance.

In 2011 it was adapted for stage at the Haifa Theatre by Noya Lantz.

== Awards ==
Awards the book earned for the author include:

- 2011, the Sapir Prize for Literature.
- 2011: officer of the Ordre des Arts et des Lettres, France
