= Valley of Tears (TV series) =

Israeli drama television series

- Genre: Serial drama, Tragedy and war
- Created by: Ron Leshem
- Based on: real events
- Starring: see below
- Country of origin: Israel
- Original languages: Hebrew; Arabic
- No. of seasons: 1
- No. of episodes: 10

Production
- Executive producers: Moshe and Leon Edri
- Producer: Gil Zeyed
- Production location: Golan Heights
- Production companies: Westend Films; Endmol Shine

Original release
- Network: Kan 11
- Release: October 19, 2020

Valley of Tears (Hebrew: עֵמֶק הַבָּכָא, Emek HaBakha), (Series original name: Hebrew: שְׁעַת נְעִילָה, Sha‘at Ne'ila – meaning "the hour of Ne'ila") is an Israeli television miniseries directed by Yaron Zilberman based on a screenplay by Ron Leshem and Daniel Amsel and starring Aviv Alush, Joy Rieger, and Lior Ashkenazi. Development of the series lasted about a decade and its filming took place over 52 days starting on July 21, 2019. The premiere episode of the first season aired on Kan 11 on October 19, 2020. It was subsequently licensed by HBO Max, airing on November 12, 2020.

The series depicts the battles of the Yom Kippur War, focusing on the northern front of the war. The series has been described as one of the most expensive television series in Israel, with advanced technologies used to recreate the battles, including the Battle of the Valley of Tears, and the cost of each episode reaching one million dollars.

== Synopsis ==
On October 6, 1973, the Yom Kippur War broke out, when Arab states led by Egypt and Syria launched a surprise invasion and almost defeated Israel on the holiest day in the Jewish calendar: Yom Kippur. The story is told from the perspective of three characters.

== Cast ==
=== Main ===
- Aviv Alush as Lieutenant Yoav Mazoz
- Shahar Tavoch as Corporal Avinoam Shapira
- Maor Schwitzer as Corporal Melakhi Bardugo
- Ofer Hayoun as Corporal Marco Dolzi
- Imri Biton as Corporal Jackie Alush
- Omer Perelman Striks as Staff Sergeant Nimrod Caspi
- Joy Rieger as Lieutenant Dafna Hirshberg
- Lior Ashkenazi as Meni Ben-Dror
- Lee Biran as Private Yoni Ben-Dror

=== Recurring ===
- Ido Bartal as Lieutenant Aviram
- Ami Smolartchik as Bentzi
- Lidor Edri as Riki Dolzi
- Ofri Biterman as Lieutenant Elad
- Tom Gal as Staff Sergeant Fiksman
- Ohad Knoller as Colonel Meir Almogi
- Tom Hagi as Sergeant Shendori
- Tom Avni as Captain Tamir

== Production ==
Production started on July 21, 2019, with filming in Hebrew. It was Israel's highest-budgeted program, with Deadline Hollywood reporting that each episode cost around $1 million. A number of "the most prominent Israeli novelists in Israel" were involved in the script. It was produced by WestEnd Films, Endemol Shine Israel, United King and KAN. Before filming began, there were ten years of development with Moshe Edery at United King. After the ten years needed to get the process fully financed, the filming took place in the Golan Heights. At one point, filming was stopped for three weeks due to nearby fighting in Syria.

The cost was attributed to the battle scenes and also the creatives hired for the project. For filming, Ron Leshem and Amit Cohen "studied Israeli army lingo and thousands of soldier testimonies. They also found and rehabilitated tanks that were actually used in the war with the help of Israel Defense Forces technicians, who outfitted them with new engines."

== Episodes ==
No.	Title	Directed by	Written by	Original release date	Israel viewers (millions)
1	"Pride Before A Fall"	Yaron Zilberman	Unknown	October 19, 2020	0.255
Senior Israeli Defence Force officials do not seem worried about the prospect of war. Corporal Avinoam Shapira, a soldier in the intelligence unit at the Mount Hermon outpost, is tasked with recording conversations obtained through wiretaps. He hears an intercepted conversation that convinces him that the Syrians will launch an attack. After his commander does not believe him, he discovers that Lieutenant Yoav, the post's combat officer, is leaving for a short vacation to be with his girlfriend, Dafna. Although Yoav does not believe Avinoam either, he misses the last ride out of the outpost and is stuck at the remote base for the weekend. In Jerusalem, Alush, a tank gunner, gathers his friend and fellow tanker Marco to return to their unit. Marco hates the establishment due to the poor quality of life of the Mizrahim compared to Ashkenazim and is considering defecting from the IDF. Marco does not know that Alush is in love with his sister. Learning that friend and fellow tanker Melachi was arrested at a violent protest, Alush convinces Marco to return to the unit to try and convince their commander, Lieutenant Aviram, to persuade the police to release Melachi. Lieutenant Aviram refuses to help Marco and Melachi's Black Panthers movement. The next day, as the country (including on-duty soldiers) are quietly praying and fasting for Yom Kippur, the Syrians launch an invasion of the Golan heights. Their objectives include the Mount Hermon outpost, which comes under attack by Syrian commandos, brought in by helicopters. Meanwhile, Marco and Alush's tank unit, the 87th, is bombarded by the Syrian air force. In Tel-Aviv, Meni Ben-Dror is woken by air raid sirens and a desperate call from his ex-wife, from Paris. The news has reported the war, and she wants Meni to find their son (later revealed to be Yoni) in the IDF and send the son back to Paris. Melachi escapes from his cell so he can get to his tank unit. As the Syrian invasion intensifies, Marco and Alush's tank unit, under the command of Lieutenant Aviram, is ordered to defensive point. Despite facing dozens of advancing Syrian tanks, Aviram's three-tank unit manages to hold their position by using their high terrain, repeatedly moving forward to fire and rolling back from the edge to confound the Syrians ability to see them.
2	"The Heavens Are Watching"	Yaron Zilberman	Unknown	October 19, 2020	N/A
Having eliminated 50 Syrian tanks, Lieutenant Aviram's three-tank unit suffers an ambush, and Aviram is killed by a sniper. Aviram's friend and second in command, Caspi, races from his tank to help Aviram. As he runs towards Aviram, Caspi's own tank is destroyed by an explosion as nearby Syrian infantry forces in hiding attack the unit. After the fight, Caspi takes command of the 87th tank unit despite being extremely traumatized by Lieutenant Aviram's death. Although the unit is extremely low on shells, Caspi orders the tank unit to continue moving towards the Henionim Axis, as directed by headquarters. As they drive towards the gathering point, Caspi sees an approaching vehicle. He opens fire with a mounted machine gun on the incoming APC, thinking it is a Syrian vehicle. The unit discovers to their horror that they fired on a friendly IDF APC and killed IDF soldiers. At the Hermon mountaintop outpost with reinforcements hours away, Lieutenant Yoav leads his small unit in an against-all-odds fight to protect the untrained and ill-equipped Hermon intelligence soldiers. At a nearby base, Yoav's girlfriend and fellow officer, Lieutenant Dafna, resists orders for all women to evacuate the front lines. She very reluctantly boards a troop transport truck with the other female soldiers that is departing the base. Hoping to get back to his friends in the tank crew, Melakhi begins hitch-hiking towards the front lines. He hitches a ride with Meni Ben-Dror, who's driving in his own passenger car towards the Golan Heights in search of his son.
3	"My Rock, My Fortress"	Unknown	Unknown	October 26, 2020	N/A
After Syrian forces infiltrate Hermon, Avinoam attempts to lead his fellow soldiers to safety through the facility's secret tunnels. He knows of a secret door on one of the deeper levels of the outpost that leads to the anntena terrace. It may be the only way to escape now that the Syrian commandos have broken through the main entrance atop the hill, trapping the Israeli soldiers within the outpost's tunnels. Lieutenant Yoav leads a small group of surviving soldiers, with Avinoam very close behind him to guide the group to the secret door. Following Caspi's unhinged machine gun attack on the Israeli APC, the tankers of the 87th run down the hill to survey the damage. All of the Israeli soldiers in the back of the carrier were killed except for one very young, very shell-shocked new paratrooper named Yoni. While Alush looks out for Yoni, the 87th grows increasingly worried about the mental stability of their new commander, Caspi. Meanwhile, Dafna decides to defy orders and to return to the base from which she was evacuated just hours earlier. She is anxious to hear news of her boyfriend, Lieutenant Yoav who was stationed at the Hermon mountaintop outpost that came under attack. As she waits as a bus stop, she meets Meni Ben-Dror and Melakhi as they stop to ask directions. Dafna joins the two, and the three of them bond as they journey to the Golan Heights to find their loved ones.
4	"Strength of My Foes"	Unknown	Unknown	November 2, 2020	N/A
At the end of the first night, the 87th holds ground atop a hill with only 1 operational tank and no shells. In the darkness Caspi futilely directs repairs of a second broken tank, but Marco realizes the 87th is beyond hope of rescue. To stay atop the hill means certain death as the Syrians continue to pour into Israel. Marco leads the 87th in a rebellion, arguing that the men should flee in the remaining tank back to IDF-controlled zoned. Caspi refuses, but after a fight he concedes. Before they can board the tank, though, a passing Syrian jet fires on the tank, destroying it and injuring several men. Meanwhile, Yoav, Avinoam, and several of the Hermon soldiers escape the Syrian commando attack at the mountaintop outpost by way of the secret doorway to the Hermon antenna terrace. After walking through the night, the soldiers are caught in a brutal Syrian ambush at the foot of the mountain. All of the Israeli soldiers are killed in the attack except for Yoav and Avinoam. The firefight also cost the Syrians several casualties. Yoav is wounded in an exchange with a fleeing Syrian soldier as the firefight ends. Avinoam tentatively rises from where he had hidden during the fight and begins to search for his beloved hedgehog, "Pine-Nut." He's challenged by an injured, unarmed Syrian soldier who was also hiding nearby. Snatching up a machine gun from one of the fallen soldiers, Avinoam replies to the unarmed Syrian in Arabic. The two begin a dialogue in Arabic, and Avinoam makes an unexpected connection with the injured Syrian soldier. Their conversation reveals their individual humanity and wishes to escape the war. As they speak, though, Yoav creeps up a short distance behind the Syrian and fires, killing the Syrian and splattering Avinoam with blood. Avinoam is stunned into silence by the act. Yoav grabs Avinoam by the vest and begins to haul him away from the scene of the ambush. Dafna, Meni Ben-Dror, and Melakhi arrive by car at the headquarters site from where Dafna had been ordered to leave the day before. Meni Ben-Dror asks for any news of his son but learns nothing. As communications begin to collapse, Dafna tries to restore order back at her tumultuous command post. In the light of the next morning, Marco, Alush, and others attend to the men wounded by the previous night's jet attack. Alush spies 100 to 120 Syrian tanks, possibly an entire division, moving along the road below their hill towards Tiberias. Headquarters radios that they are doing their best to get more troops to the hill to help the 87th but asks that the 87th hold out a few more hours. As the 87th digs in to await rescue, an Israeli jet flies over, giving the men a reason to cheer. Their cheers are cut short when the jet is shot down by a Syrian surface-to-air missile just a short distance away. The pilot ejects safely and begins to parachute down between the 87th and the advancing Syrian army. Caspi immediately leaps up and races down the hill towards the downed pilot, with Marco, Alush, and Yoni running after him to try to stop him. As they reach the bottom of the hill, the men see four Syrian soldiers advancing towards the pilot. Marco and Alush pin down the Syrian soldiers while Caspi and Yoni sneak close to the Syrian jeep to rescue the pilot. They all escape quickly back up the hill to the bunker to hold out for rescue.
5	"Stuck on the Hill"	Unknown	Unknown	November 9, 2020	N/A
With Syrian forces advancing on their location, Marco tries to use a stranded pilot as leverage for a rescue mission. Meanwhile, Melakhi remains determined to find his friends, despite revelations from Meni about a possible informant in their inner-circle. Alone in Syrian-controlled territory, Avinoam and Yoav find a common bond in the most dangerous of circumstances.
6	"Rain on Us!"	Unknown	Unknown	November 16, 2020	N/A
At command, Meni challenges the army's seeming indifference to his son's fate, while Dafna takes on a mission no one else is willing to handle. Meanwhile, Avinoam does his best to bring a wounded and desperate Yoav to safety, and as the 87th tries to hold back the Syrian army, Melakhi confronts Alush for ratting him out to the police –but learns of an entirely different deception instead.
7	"Night at the Bunker"	Unknown	Unknown	November 23, 2020	N/A
At base, Avinoam faces questions from military police, who seem more concerned about the abandoned Hermon facility than rescuing Yoav. Trapped in a hilltop bunker as the Syrian army closes in, the 87th must decide who will make a crucial sacrifice. Nearby, Meni attempts to convince a tank crew to help him reach his son.
8	"Preparing for the Big Battle"	Unknown	Unknown	November 30, 2020	N/A
Despite their mental and physical wounds, Melakhi, Marco, and Yoni volunteer to head back into the inferno. As the hours tick down toward a massive armored battle, Melakhi turns his suspicions on Marco, while Dafna and Avinoam realize they have a shared connection.
9	"The Abyss"	Unknown	Unknown	December 7, 2020	N/A
Staring down hundreds of enemy tanks in a seemingly hopeless battle, Melakhi steps up to lead the 87th, forcing his crew to rethink their entire training in order to make it out alive. Meanwhile, when Avinoam surrenders himself to protect Dafna, his fears of captivity come to fruition. With their very survival in question, Meni and Yoni finally reconcile, and Marco looks to make amends with Melakhi.
10	"Valley of Tears"	Unknown	Unknown	December 7, 2020	N/A
In the brutal Valley of Tears battle, the tank crew faces impossible challenges and suffers heavy casualties at point-blank range. Meanwhile, a Syrian interrogator tests Avinoam's determination to guard intelligence secrets.

== Reception ==
Release of the series in Israel prompted what The New York Times described as "an intense public reckoning with the scope of war trauma and the treatment of survivors" by exposing a younger generation to battlefield sacrifices and reliving a period so painful that Israeli culture rarely deals with it. The series focused new attention on war veterans suffering from post-traumatic stress disorder, and also generated criticism for historical inaccuracies.

== Release ==
On October 13, 2020, distributor WestEnd Films announced it had sold global rights to the series to HBO Max. It began streaming on HBO Max in the United States on November 12.

Hollywood Suite announced in November 2020 that it had acquired broadcast rights to the series in Canada, with broadcasts beginning December 19. This comes despite HBO Max's acquisition of global rights, as in most cases the Canadian rights to these programs are assumed by Crave.
