= Battle of the Beaufort =

Israeli–Palestinian battle during the 1982 Lebanon War

- Part of the 1982 Lebanon War and the Lebanese Civil War
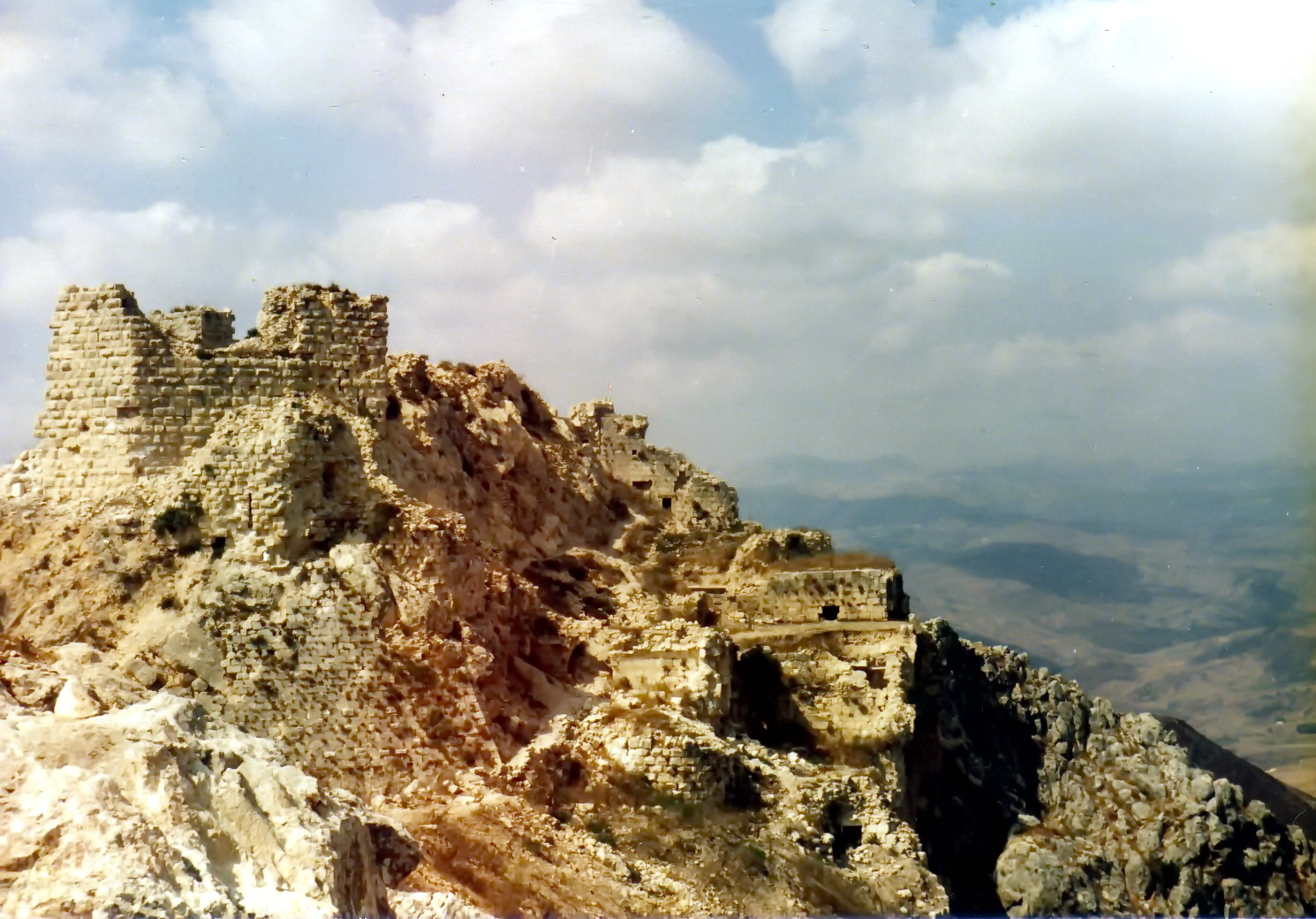
- Beaufort Castle, 1982.
| Date | 6–7 June 1982 |
| Location | Beaufort Castle, Lebanon 33.3244°N 35.5320°E |
| Result | Israeli victory |

Belligerents
| Israel | Palestine Liberation Organization (PLO) |

Commanders and leaders
| (Israel) Lt.-Col. Zvika Barkai (Israel) Moshe Kaplinsky (WIA) (Israel) Giora Harnik † | (Palestine) Com. Ya'qoub Sumour (Rasim) † |

Strength
| 88 soldiers from Golani Brigade | Up to 30 fighters from Fatah student battalion |

Casualties and losses
| 6 IDF soldiers killed A-4 Skyhawk shot down and pilot captured | Dozens killed |
- Location of the Beaufort Castle in Lebanon

The Battle of the Beaufort was fought between the Israel Defense Forces (IDF) and the Palestine Liberation Organization (PLO) on June 6, 1982, over Beaufort Castle, Lebanon. It was one of the first clashes of the 1982 Lebanon War and resulted in the IDF capturing the castle.

== Background ==
Located 717 meters above sea level, Beaufort Castle (Arabic: قلعة الشقيف, romanized: Qal'at ash-Shaqif) commands great parts of the Upper Galilee and South Lebanon. It could be used to direct artillery, and even Syria had sent artillery spotters there. Israel shelled the fortress repeatedly but could never actually enter it - the massive basalt rocks of the Medieval construction proving an effective defense even in face of modern artillery and aerial bombardments. For Israel, it had become a symbol of the Palestinian power over the region. For the Palestinians, it served as a memento of Saladin's victory over the Crusaders in 1192 and of their own endurance against Israel, and the PLO used it as the colophon on leaflets.

Two weeks before the war started, Yasser Arafat visited the castle, sat down with its defenders and assured them that in thirty-six hours of fighting, the PLO could get a ceasefire. The sector commander protested, insisting that there was no way they could withstand an Israeli attack for so long.

== Preparations for the attack ==
The IDF Northern Command had been planning to capture the Beaufort for a long time before the war, assigning the mission to the commando unit of the Golani Brigade. The unit had studied the castle for years and trained for tactics to conquer it.

In August 1980 the IDF launched an operation attempting to conquer the Beaufort castle. Israeli air force and artillery attacked the castle itself, al-Khardali Bridge, north-east, just below the fortress, as well as the nearby villages of Arnoun and Kfar Tebnit. An infantry unit belonging to the Golani Brigade attempted to occupy the castle but was beaten back. Three IDF soldiers were killed while the Palestinians suffered 29 casualties. The high casualties prompted the Palestinians to reinforce their positions at Beaufort, building a network of covered trenches and reinforced shelters dug into the hillsides.

However, the way the invasion progressed in 1982 made the capture of the Beaufort unnecessary. Capture would have been necessary had the IDF decided to cross the Litani River via the al-Khardali bridge, as they had in 1980, but since the IDF instead decided to use the Qa'qa'iya bridge, located much further to the west, the Israelis could have proceeded to Nabatiye unaffected by the Beaufort. Since the PLO troops stationed in and around the castle were not firing at Israeli settlements when the war began, there was no urgent need to neutralize them. The General Staff issued a command to postpone the operation, but the command failed to reach the Golani commando unit.

The former commander of the Golani commandos, Giora (Guni) Harnik, had been discharged from the IDF just a week earlier, but was suddenly called back. Since the unit commander, Moshe Kaplinsky, was gravely wounded while on the road, Harnik was sent as replacement. He drove there so fast that his APC flipped over, although he and the other passengers were unharmed. His surprise return was a morale boost for the men of the unit. His deputy was Mordechai (Moti) Goldman.

== The Battle ==
21 fighters from the elite Student battalion (later known as the al-Jarmaq Battalion) of the Fatah movement were deployed inside the castle, under the command of Ya'qoub Abdel-Hafiz Sumour (nom de guerre "Rasim"). The fighters were divided into three squads of seven members each. The squads were deployed left, right and centre in the lower sections of the castle. The positions were well dug in with covered trenches and concrete firing positions. Fatah also had bases in and around the nearby villages of Kfar Tebnit and Arnoun. A unit of the Democratic Front for the Liberation of Palestine (DFLP) was deployed between the castle and the village of Arnoun. A number of fighters from Kurdistan Workers' Party (PKK), on training with Palestinian organizations in Lebanon, fought with the DFLP in Beaufort area.

The battle started with a heavy Israeli artillery and aircraft bombardment. Heavy use was made of cluster bombs. Since the Palestinians were well dug in, no fighter was injured during this phase. But since the ground became covered with unexploded ordnance, exploding on touch like mines, access to the armoury and other supplies became risky and difficult. Two fighters were lightly wounded when trying to clear cluster bombs.

In the afternoon the Palestinian forces succeeded in shooting down an Israeli A-4 Skyhawk fighter-bomber flying over the Beaufort castle, with a Strela 2 (SA-7) handheld surface-to-air missile. The pilot, Cpt. Aharon Achiaz, parachuted and was taken prisoner by Palestinian forces. He was brought to Beirut and later released during the evacuation of PLO forces in August 1982.

The main IDF force in the central sector advanced from the border over Tayibe and Qantara and crossed the Litani river at the Qa'qa'iya bridge. Well over the bridge, the force split into three parts: one continued to the coast over Doueir and Zefta, the second surrounded the town of Nabatiye and the third proceeded to the Beaufort castle.

The force heading for Beaufort consisted of 65 men from the Golani engineering company and 23 men from the Golani commando unit. They were travelling in 20 APCs, accompanied by a platoon of tanks. The attack had originally been planned as a daylight attack, but due to congested roads in south Lebanon at the time and repeated breakdowns of the tanks, the force did not arrive in highlands west of the Beaufort until 4 PM. None of the tanks managed to arrive at the location. The plans had to be changed to a night attack, without any support from the tanks.

The engineering company, under Lt.Col. Barkai, was to take the southern outpost with its bunkers while the Golani commandos, under Moshe Kaplinsky, were to take the northern outpost and its trenches. It was decided that the Golani engineers would take the lead and the commandos would follow. The engineers charged up the hill of the fortress and managed to slip through without casualties. They attacked the Palestinian positions and managed to conquer the antenna position. One soldier was killed and several were wounded. The commandos, however, were cut down by heavy machine gun fire on their way to the top. Of the original 21 fighters, only seven or eight managed to reach their destination. Two soldiers were killed and four wounded. The rest were taking cover halfway. Led by Mordechai Goldman, the force began a second assault, killing several Palestinians. They were later joined by Harnik and two of his soldiers. They were facing the main bunker, where a Palestinian fighter, entrenched in a concrete position, was firing his machine gun. The Palestinian managed to kill Harnik with a bullet to the chest before Goldman threw an explosive charge at his position, killing the Palestinian fighter and destroying the position. Most of the remaining Palestinians were killed as Israeli troops secured the mountain.

Because of both weather conditions and continued firing nearby, medical evacuation of the Israeli wounded was delayed until shortly before daybreak. Only then, did the Israeli death toll - six men, including the unit commander - become apparent. After it, the soldiers spread out and climbed to take the roof of the fortress, which turned out to be deserted. By 6:30 AM, Israeli control over the castle was secured.

The Israeli soldiers discovered a rope ladder hanging down from the heights of the fortress, suggesting that some of the Palestinian fighters had escaped during the night. According to Mu'in at-Tahir, the commander of the Fatah Students' battalion (who personally did not take part in the battle inside the castle), some of the fighters managed to escape from the castle. At ten in the evening, units from the Students’ battalion, positioned outside the castle, attacked IDF tanks stationed to the west of the castle with rockets. In the turmoil, a handful of fighters managed to sneak out. Some of them were killed in other battles during the Lebanon war, but three of the Fatah fighters from the battle of the Beaufort castle survived the war.

== Aftermath ==
During the day, the IDF Chief of Staff Rafael Eitan visited the troops and was astounded to learn of the death toll. Later that day, Prime Minister Menachem Begin and Minister of Defense Ariel Sharon arrived, accompanied by newsmen and photographers. They did not know about the losses, as Sharon did not inquire before declaring that the battle was won without casualties on the Israeli side. Showing interest in the Palestinian resistance, Begin asked "Did they have machine guns?", a question which later became a symbol of how uninformed the Israeli leadership was of the events on the front throughout the war.

Harnik was posthumously given the division commander citation. Mordechai Goldman was awarded the Medal of Courage for his actions, and later medically discharged from the army after being wounded by Syrian artillery outside Beirut. The commander of the Golani Brigade later confessed that in retrospect, he would not have attacked the Beaufort. An investigation was held after the war as to why the order to postpone the operation failed to reach its destination but produced inconclusive results.

There were also persistent reports of "friendly fire" incidents in the battle. One officer was apparently wounded under such circumstances. There is also a question mark hanging over one of the IDF fatalities, which was never officially clarified.

Most of the Fatah fighters in the castle fell in the battle. That includes the commander of the castle, Ya'coub Sumour, and his deputy Abdul Karim al-Kahalani. After the battle, the IDF handed over 30 bodies for burial to the villagers of nearby Yohmur. The bodies had been collected in the castle itself and in and around the villages of Arnoun and Kafr Tibnit. Among those buried was the local DFLP commander, Khalid al-Asmar. According to Israeli accounts, between 15 and 24 Palestinian bodies were collected after the battle.

For fear of mines and unexploded cluster bombs, the IDF closed off the lower section of the castle, where the Palestinians had been dug in. Therefore, the body of the Palestinian commander, Ya'qoub Sumour, was only found in 2004, several years after the Israeli withdrawal from south Lebanon, together with Mohammad Abu Saleh, a Fatah fighter of Yemenite origin. Both were buried with full military honours in the Palestinian Ain al-Hilweh refugee camp.

== Bibliography ==
- Bar-Zohar, Michael; Mishal, Nissim (2015). No Mission Is Impossible - The Death-Defying Missions of the Israeli Special Forces. Ecco.
- Fisk, Robert (2001). Pity the Nation: Lebanon at War. Oxford University Press. ISBN 0-19-280130-9.
- Sayigh, Yezid (1998). Armed Struggle and the Search for State - The Palestinian National Movement 1949-1993. Oxford University Press, USA.
- Schiff, Zeev; Yaari, Ehud; Friedman, Ina (1984). Israel's Lebanon War. Simon and Schuster. pp. 320. ISBN 0-671-47991-1.
