= Yitzhak Sadeh Prize =

Yitzhak Sadeh Prize for Military Literature
- Awarded for: Finest book on a military topic
- Country: Israel
- Presented by: The Association for the Award of the Yitzhak Sadeh Prize
- First award: 1972; 54 years ago
- Website: https://palmach.org.il/amuta/itzhaksadeprize/

The Yitzhak Sadeh Prize for Military Literature is an annual literary award given in Israel for the finest book on a military topic. It is named in memory of Palmach founder Yitzhak Sadeh.

== Winners ==
- 1976, The Emissary: The Life of Enzo Seren by Ruth Bondy
- 1980, In the Days of Destruction and Revolt by Zivia Lubetkin, on the Warsaw Ghetto Uprising
- 1984, To an Independent Jewish Army: The United Kibbutz in the Haganah 1939–1949 by Uri Brenner
- 1985, Testimony Pages by Zvika Dror and members of Kibbutz Lohamei HaGeta'ot (The Ghetto Fighters' Kibbutz)
- 1991, Platoon Commander's Pin by Yigal Shefi
- 1993, The Resistance Boats: Illegal Immigration 1945–1948 by Nahum Bogner
- 1995, First Signs of Armor by Amiad Brezner
- 1998, Points of Strength: Settlement Policy in Order to Achieve Political and Security Goals Before the State and in Its Beginning by Osnat Shiran
- 2002, Adjusting Sights by Haim Sabato
- 2006, Beaufort, by Ron Leshem, on the end of IDF combat in the 2006 Lebanon War
- 2014, Getting to Know Hamas by Shlomi Eldar
- 2018, War Lives, by Nitza Ben-Dov
