= Esther Peled =

Israeli author

- אסתר פלד
- Born: Israel
- Occupations: Writer and a psychologist

Esther Peled (Hebrew: אסתר פלד) is an Israeli writer and a psychologist.

She was born and lives in Israel. When doing her B.S. degree in literature and psychology she had courses in haiku and Zen buddhism, which made an impact on her work and writings, although she does not identify herself as a Buddhist. She earned M.S. in clinical psychology and Ph.D. in philosophy.

== Works ==
- 2017:Widely Open Underneath (Hebrew: פתח גדול מלמטה), a book of short stories. Taken together, they tell a larger story of the life of a woman from a small community.
- 2012: The Clear Light of Reality (Hebrew: לאורה הצח של המציאות), twelve short stories, the first book of prose. The stories of the book are "laden with human grief (in love, parting, longing, loneliness, betrayal, anger)", and only the last one suggests some hope.

She also published several books in psychotherapy, including,

- 2005: פסיכואנליזה ובודהיזם : על היכולת האנושית לדעת (Psychoanalysis and Buddhism: About the Capacity to Know)
- 2007: להרבות טוב בעולם: בודהיזם, מדיטציה פסיכותרפיה (To multiply good in the world: Buddhism, Meditation, Psychotherapy)
- 2022 פתיחות מלאה וספק: שיחות על פסיכותרפיה ודת (Full openness and doubt: Talks on Psychotherapy and Religion)

== Awards ==
- 2017: Sapir Prize for Literature, for Widely Open Underneath
