= Ron Leshem =

Israeli-American author and television producer (born 1976)

- רון לשם
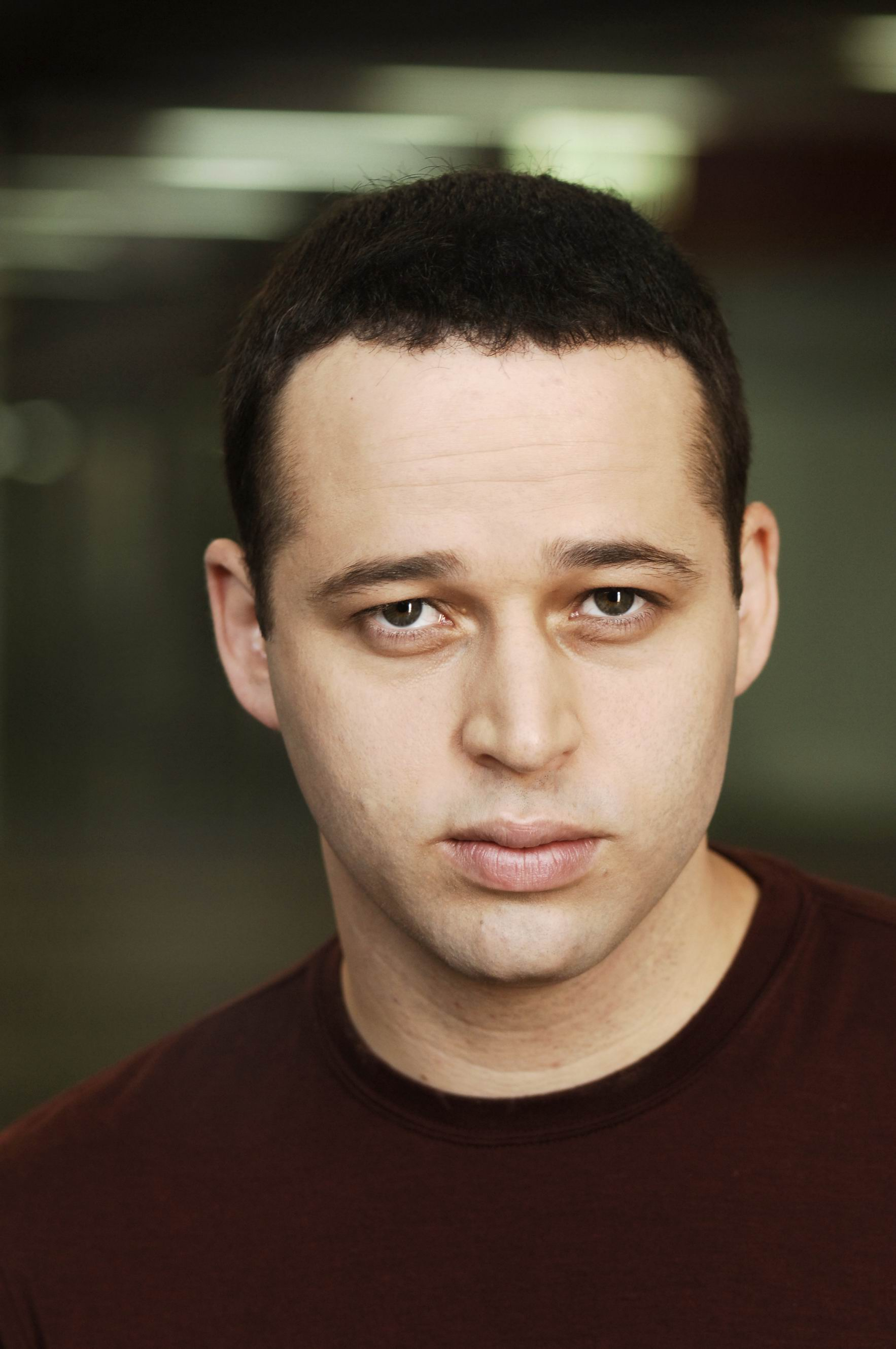
- Leshem at the 2006 Sapir Prize
- Born: 1976 (age 49–50); Tel-Aviv, Israel
- Occupations: Television producer; film director; screenwriter; author
- Years active: 1998–present
- Children: 2

Ron Leshem (Hebrew: רון לשם) is an Israeli American screenwriter, television producer, film director, and author. He is an executive producer of Euphoria, which was based on the Israeli television series he co-created and co-wrote in 2012. His first film as a screenwriter, Beaufort, was nominated for an Academy Award for Best International Feature Film and based on his novel of the same name that received the Sapir Prize in 2006.

Leshem has worked on television series including No Man's Land, Valley of Tears, and The Gordin Cell, and the film Incitement.

== Career ==
=== Initial television work and journalism ===
By age 15, Leshem was working in the television industry on educational and youth programming as a researcher and editing coordinator. He helped to develop Zombit, a computer program that became a television show about technology and the internet. Leshem was also a journalist for Ma'ariv La'noar at this time.

He worked as a news editor at Yediot Ahronot in 1998 and became the head of the reporters' department two years later. During those years, he also worked as a magazine writer publishing investigative reports about Israel's prison system and animal testing, conducting interviews with Palestinian figures and politicians as well as what was going on within Palestinian territories.

Leshem was appointed deputy editor-in-chief and head of the news division at Maariv in 2001. He also founded the newspaper's website.

=== Television production and adaptation of Euphoria ===
Leshem transitioned from print media to television in 2005. From 2006 to 2009, he worked in content development for Keshet Broadcasting, where he became chief of content and programming at the network. Leshem managed both its reality/entertainment/documentary and drama divisions. Israeli television series he was involved with include Arab Labor, the A-word, Beauty and the Baker, False Flag and Prisoners of War, which was later adapted into the American series Homeland.

In 2011, Leshem co-created and co-wrote his first original drama series, The Gordin Cell, which was about a Russian spy family pressured by their Moscow handlers to recruit their young son. It received multiple nominations at the Awards of the Israeli Television Academy. The series was sold for adaptation to NBC, first by Peter Berg and later by George Nolfi. Allegiance aired on NBC in 2015 and was canceled after one season.

He co-created the original Euphoria in 2012 along with director Daphna Levin. It was motivated by Leshem wanting to create a more realistic show about teenagers and described as "Trainspotting meets Gus Van Sant". The series had a low budget and did not have the resources to film shorter scenes. It also contained cultural specificities relevant to Israelis and received mixed reviews due to adult content for a conservative audience. Over the following years, Leshem pitched an adaptation of the series to American networks and studios. HBO ordered an American adaption in 2018 where Leshem was an executive producer alongside being credited as a writer for the pilot episode.

=== Move to United States, development deals and serial television creation ===
In early 2013, Leshem moved from Israel to the United States, joining Legendary Entertainment as a development producer. He is based in Boston and has an office in Los Angeles.

Influenced by the assassination of Yitzhak Rabin at a rally in support of the Oslo Accords, Leshem co-wrote Incitement in 2019 as a political thriller profiling Rabin’s assassin, Yigal Amir, and the influences that shaped his decisions. Leshem stated that "it was never a film about 1995...it's about today—how people are losing faith in democracy and how the politics of hate are taking over." He also signed a development deal with Red Arrow Studios International to create scripted dramas.

Leshem co-created, co-wrote and produced the French series No Man's Land, which followed female Kurdish fighters as well as three British friends who travel to join ISIS during the Syrian civil war. The series was released on Hulu. He also co-created, co-wrote and produced the Max series Valley of Tears, a mini-series about the Yom Kippur War, which was released in Israel before being picked up by HBO in 2020.

Traitor, an eight-part thriller inspired by the disappearance of Malaysian Airlines Flight 370, premiered in Israel in 2022. Leshem co-created, co-wrote and produced the series that was initially picked up by WestEnd Films in 2017. The next year he co-created, co-wrote and produced Red Skies which takes place during the Second Intifada based on a novel by Daniel Shinar. The series was nominated for the Best Series award at the Series Mania festival.

Leshem has also co-written the Hulu series Fertile Crescent, which focuses on the Syrian Civil War.

In 2023, Bad Boy premiered at the Toronto International Film Festival (TIFF). The drama series was co-created, co-written and produced by Leshem and set in a juvenile detention facility following a boy that is imprisoned who later becomes a comedian. It received seven Israeli Television Academy Awards following its release in Israel in 2024. Netflix acquired the global streaming rights after the TIFF premiere and released the series in May 2025. Upon its Netflix release, Bad Boy ranked within the top ten shows on the streaming platform in May.

Keshet International announced that it would launch Leshem's spy thriller Trust No One on its network, which premiered in March 2025, with a later launch on Netflix. As of its premiere, See-Saw Films was in early-stage development on an English adaptation of the series.

== Authorship ==
As a novelist, Leshem's debut novel Beaufort was published in Hebrew in 2006. Written in the form of a diary of an Israeli army officer, the book was on Israel’s bestseller list for two years and translated into multiple languages. He co-wrote a film adaptation of the novel with director Joseph Cedar the next year. The film received an Academy Award nomination for Best Foreign Language Film and won the Silver Bear for Best Director at the Berlin International Film Festival.

He published his second novel, The Underground Bazaar, a coming-of-age story told in first-person by a student in Tehran. Leshem said his passion was to highlight similarities between Israeli and Iranian societies. The novel was also a bestseller, translated into several languages and published in France, Germany, Italy, and other countries.

His 2019 novel, When We Were Beautiful (Hebrew: יפים כמו שהיינו), is a coming-of-age story set in Gaza in the late 1990s, with a parallel narrative set in a magical realist version of Latin America. The book was published in Germany and is being translated into English by Jessica Cohen.

== Filmography ==
=== Television ===
Year	Title	Credited as			
Year	Title	Creator	Writer	Producer	Editor
2011–2013	The Gordin Cell	Yes	Yes	Yes	No
2012	Euphoria	Yes	Yes	Yes	No
2015	Allegiance	No	Yes	Yes	No
2015	Spy	Yes	No	No	No
2013–2015	Beauty and the Baker	No	No	No	Yes
2019–present	Euphoria (American version)	No	Yes	Yes	No
2020–present	No Man's Land	Yes	Yes	Yes	No
2020–present	Valley of Tears	Yes	Yes	Yes	No
2022	Traitor	Yes	Yes	Yes	No
2023	Red Skies	Yes	Yes	Yes	No
2024	Bad Boy	Yes	Yes	Yes	No
2024	Trust No One	Yes	Yes	Yes	No

=== Film ===
Year	Title			
Year	Title	Director	Writer	Executive Producer
2007	Beaufort	No	Yes	Yes
2019	Incitement	No	Yes	Yes

=== As development executive ===
- Arab Labor (2007–2011)
- Ramzor (Traffic light) (2008–2013)
- Prisoners of War (2010–2012)
- The A-Word (2010–2014)
- Polishuk (2010)

== Awards and nominations ==
Year	Award	Category	Work	Result	Ref.
2006	The Sapir Prize for Literature	Best Novel of The Year	Beaufort	Won	
2006	Yitzhak Sadeh Prize	Best Novel of The Year	Beaufort	Won	
2007	Ophir Award, Israeli Academy Awards	Best Screenplay	Beaufort	Nominated	
2008	80th Academy Awards	Academy Award for Best Foreign Language Film	Beaufort	Nominated	
2012	Israeli Television Academy Awards	Best Drama Series	The Gordin Cell	Nominated	
2012	Israeli Television Academy Awards	Best Screenplay for Drama Series	The Gordin Cell	Nominated	
2012	Series Mania Festival	Forum Des Images	The Gordin Cell	Nominated	
2013	Israeli Television Academy Awards	Best Drama Series	Euphoria	Nominated	
2013	Israeli Television Academy Awards	Best Screenplay for Drama Series	Euphoria	Nominated	
2014	Israeli Television Academy Awards	Best Drama Series	The Gordin Cell (2nd season)	Nominated	
2014	Israeli Television Academy Awards	Best Screenplay for Drama Series	The Gordin Cell (2nd season)	Nominated	
2019	Ophir Award, Israeli Academy Awards	Best Film for 2019	Incitement	Won	
2020	Series Mania Festival	The Official Competition	No Man's Land	Nominated	
2020	Series Mania Festival	The Official Competition	Valley of Tears	Won	
2020	British Academy Television Awards	Best International Programme	Euphoria	Nominated	
2020	Israeli Television Academy Awards	Best Drama Series	Valley of Tears	Nominated	
2020	C21 International Drama Awards	Best Non-English Language Drama Series	No Man's Land	Won	
2022	Emmy Awards	Primetime Emmy Award for Outstanding Drama Series	Euphoria	Nominated	
2023	Monte-Carlo Television Festival	Best Drama TV Series	Trust No One	Nominated	
2023	Series Mania Festival	Best Series	Red Skies	Nominated	
2023	Global Indian Film Awards	Best TV Series	Red Skies	Won	
2023	TV Series Festival Berlin	Best TV Drama	Red Skies	Won	
2024	Buenos Aires International Film Festival	Best TV Series	Red Skies	Won	
2025	Israeli Television Academy Awards	Best Drama Series	Bad Boy	Won	
2025	Israeli Television Academy Awards	Best Screenplay for Drama Series	Bad Boy	Won	
