= Red Skies (TV series) =

Israeli TV series

- שמים אדומים
- Genre: Drama, Suspense, Action
- Created by: Ron Leshem, Daniel Shinar, Daniel Amsel, Amit Cohen
- Directed by: Alon Zingman
- Country of origin: Israel
- Original language: Hebrew
- No. of seasons: 1
- No. of episodes: 8

Production
- Production company: Yoav Gross Productions

Original release
- Network: Channel 13
- Release: June 19 – August 19, 2023

"Red Skies" (Hebrew: שמים אדומים) is an Israeli television series that premiered on June 19th, 2023 on Channel 13 in Israel. The series' creators were Ron Leshem, Daniel Shinar, Daniel Amsel, and Amit Cohen, alongside director Alon Zingman. The series is based on Daniel Shinar's book "Red Skies".

In February 2023, the series was nominated for the Best Series award at the Series Mania festival in Lille, France.

== Plot ==
The series takes place during the Second Intifada, the Palestinian uprising which occurred in the early 2000s, and Operation Defensive Shield that followed it. Sa'ar Rigbi (Israeli Jew) and Ali Alma (Palestinian Muslim) are childhood friends with a close emotional bond. They met as teenagers when they worked together in Jerusalem in the period following the Oslo Accords. However, years later, when Israel in general and Jerusalem, in particular, are at the height of warfare, their choices position them as adversaries, and they become hunter and hunted. Sa'ar's girlfriend Jenny (American), who also knew both during their youth, finds herself between the two and in the midst of the conflict.

At a time when Israel is experiencing a political and security crisis, Jenny personally faces the dilemma of choosing between their two friends.

== Cast and characters ==
- Sa'ar Rigbi (Maor Sweitzer) - An Israeli Jew from Jerusalem. A sensitive soul that hides behind a short fuse, he's brilliant but tries to avoid people. As an outsider, he's inclined to observation, thus developing sensitivity to nuances, small details, and human behaviors.
- Ali Almasri (played by Amir Khouri) - A Palestinian Muslim from Nablus, who worked in the American Colony Hotel in East Jerusalem as a teenager, where he met Sa'ar. They've been close friends ever since. He is a medical student at the Hebrew University and shares a flat in Jerusalem with Sa'ar and Jenny Horowitz, Sa'ar's American girlfriend, whom Ali secretly loves as well.
- Jenny Horowitz (played by Annie Shapero) - An American Jew. A press photographer with a dream of becoming a war journalist. She chooses to stay in Nablus when journalists are instructed to leave, both for the hunt of news stories and to remain close to Ali.
- Tilly Rubin (Alona Sa'ar) - An intelligence officer in the IDF’s elite unit 8200. A workaholic who fears that if she stops working even for a minute, she will find that she is not good enough to do what she does. She is the daughter of a senior general in the IDF, fighting to prove herself, even at the cost of exaggerated self-confidence. Tilly fears that the constant stress she is under will explode in her face, and therefore, strives not to show human weaknesses.
- Pepper Galit Nimni, code name “Pepper” (Lihi Kornowski) - A Shin Bet operative, who serves as a liaison between 8200 and the combat units in the field – and vice versa .Her temperament is straight-spiced with humor.
- Yuval Bar-Zeev (Yaakov Zada-Daniel) - A Shin Bet agent who supervises the activities of Unit 8200 dealing with terror in the West Bank. He mentors and grooms Tilly Rubin to take over the activity. He is “the responsible adult” in the base, so he looks at the passionate young soldiers around him with a knowledgeable, experienced gaze and tries to connect them to reality.
- Yuri (Lev Levin) - A hacker in 8200, and a childhood friend of Sa'ar.
- Morali (Yoav Levi) - A veteran listener (Arabic wiretapper) who has already seen everything as part of his job, is a little tired of his work and is ready to retire.
- Ra'ed Almasri, "Alrassam" (The Painter) (George Iskandar) - Ali's older brother, a slippery fugitive and a sniper. Has a degree in Chemistry from a university in Jordan.
- Baby Nadia (Harel Aharoni) - Ra'ed's daughter, a two-year-old toddler, who is his whole world. Later in the plot, Nadia grew up with her aunt (Ali and Ra'ed's sister).
- Rafik Zitawi (Louai Noufi) - A traffic policeman and Ali's parents' neighbor, he’s a childhood friend of Ra'ed and Ali and Ra'ed's "soldier".
- Zeina - Ali's daughter's mother. A Christian from a liberal family and the mother of Ali's daughter.
- Nadav (Yoni Aftergut) - Sensitive and smiling. Tilly Rubin's fresh boyfriend is in love with her "a bit more" than she is in love with him. Morale officer, and team commander in the Egoz unit, who spends most of his time in the West Bank during its most intense period.

== Production ==
The series was inspired by the bestselling book "Red Skies" by Daniel Shinar, published in 2018.

The series was shot in Israel, including in Rosh HaAyin, Ramla, Jaffa, Nazareth, and Jerusalem. It was broadcast in 2023 on the Reshet 13 channel.
