= Beaufort Castle, Lebanon =

Crusader fortress in Nabatieh Governorate, Lebanon

Beaufort Castle
- قلعة الشقيف
- Nabatieh Governorate, Lebanon
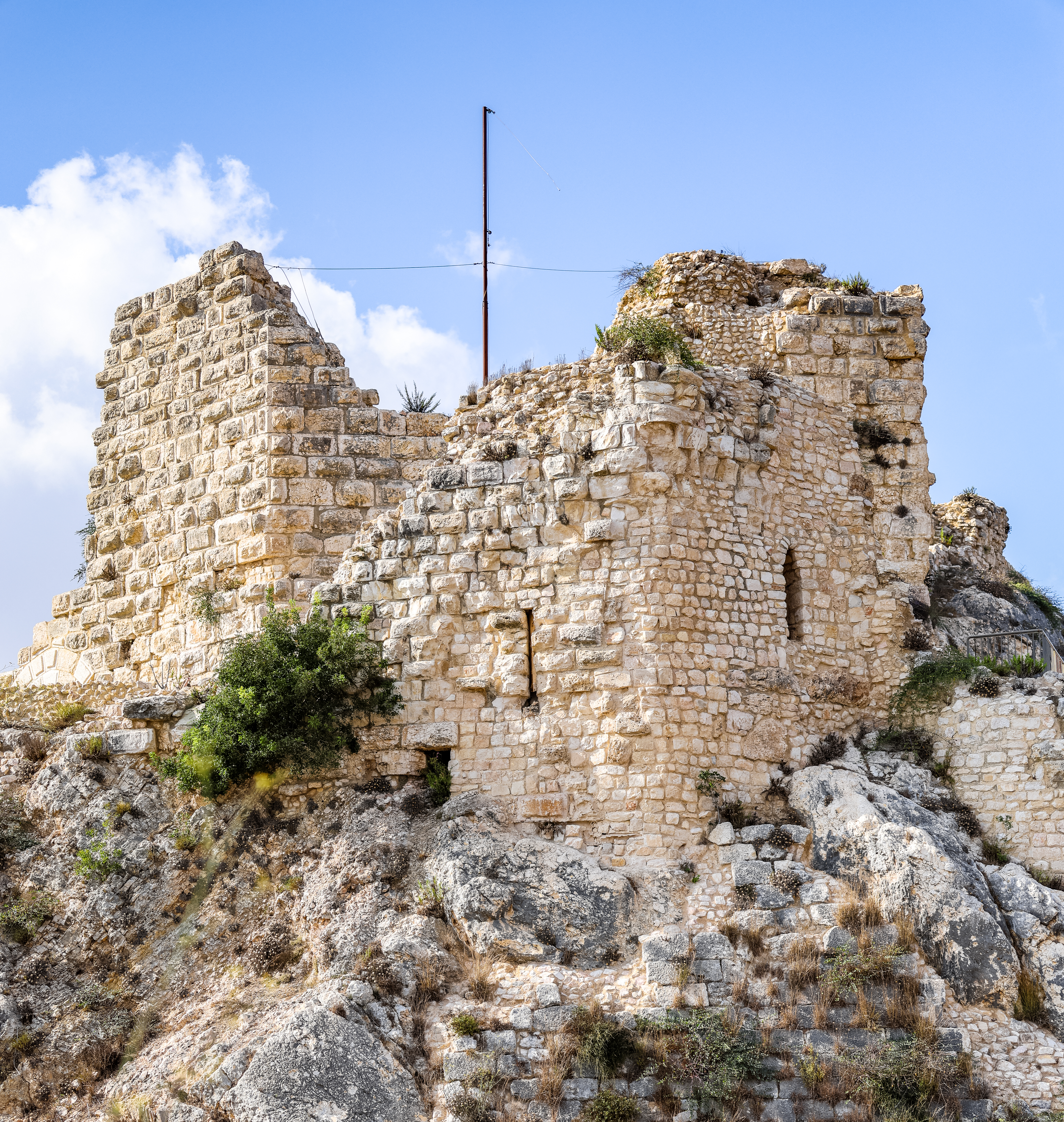
- The remains of the ancient castle in 2022

Site information
- Type: Castle
- Condition: Ruined: - Early 17th c., Ottomans fighting against Fakhr al-Din II (fl. 1620s-1633) destroy the castle's upper parts.; - 1782 Jazzar Pasha destroys many of the remaining fortifications.; - 1837 Galilee earthquake, further damage; - After 1837 ruins used as a quarry; - 1976-1980, IDF raids on PLO-held castle; - 1982, site shelled by IDF before Battle of the Beaufort, which itself causes damage.; - 1982-2000, IDF-held castle and nearby base heavily shelled by PLO and Hezbollah; - 2026 Israel-Hezbollah war, Israel strikes site. IDF captures site in May, Hezbollah strikes follow.

Location
- Location within Lebanon
- Coordinates: 33.3244°N 35.5320°E

Site history
- Built: 12th century
- Built by: Crusaders

UNESCO World Heritage Site
- Official name: Qalaat al-Chakif (Beaufort Castle)
- Part of: Mount Amel Castles
- Criteria: Cultural: ii, iv
- Reference: 1810
- Inscription: 2026 (48th Session)
- Endangered: 2026–present

Beaufort or Belfort Castle, known locally as Qal'at al-Shaqif (Arabic: قلعة الشقيف, romanized: Qalʿat al-Shaqīf, lit. 'Castle of the Steep Cliff') or Shaqif Arnun (شقيف أرنون, Shaqīf Arnūn), is a Crusader fortress in Nabatieh Governorate, Southern Lebanon, about 1 kilometre (0.62 mi) to the south-south-east of the village of Arnoun. There was a fortification on the site before it was captured by Fulk, King of Jerusalem, in 1139 and construction of the Crusader castle probably began soon after. Saladin captured Beaufort in 1190, but 50 years later Crusaders re-took it. In 1268 Sultan Baibars finally captured the castle for the Islamic forces.

Beaufort provides one of the few cases in which a medieval castle proved of military value and utility in modern warfare as well, as shown by its late 20th-century history, especially during the 1982 Lebanon War. The castle was used as an Israeli Defence Forces base from 1982 until 2000 during the Israeli occupation of Southern Lebanon. It was captured again by IDF forces in May 2026 during the 2026 Lebanon War.

== Name ==
The castle was named bel fort or beau fort (Old French for 'beautiful fortress') by the Crusaders who built the castle in the 12th-13th centuries.

Its Arabic name is Qalʿat al-Shaqīf, with qal'a meaning 'castle' and shaqif (شقيف) meaning massive rock that hangs over or descends sharply from a mountain, so 'massive overhanging rock' or 'steep cliff', Qalʿat al-Shaqīf thus meaning 'Castle of the High Rock' or 'of the Steep Cliff'; shqif is a borrowing from Aramaic.

== History ==
=== Crusader/Ayyubid and Mamluk periods ===
The outcrop occupied by the castle overlooks the Litani River. Beaufort Castle stands atop a 300-metre (980 ft) cliff, which declines steeply eastwards to the river.

Little is known of the site prior to its capture by Crusader forces in 1139, as no contemporary documents mention the site before then. However, historians assume that the castle's commanding hilltop site made it a strategic position that was fortified before that time. Fulk, King of Jerusalem, captured the fortification in 1139 and gave the site to the lords of Sidon. Medieval historian Hugh Kennedy speculates that construction of the Crusader castle began shortly thereafter.

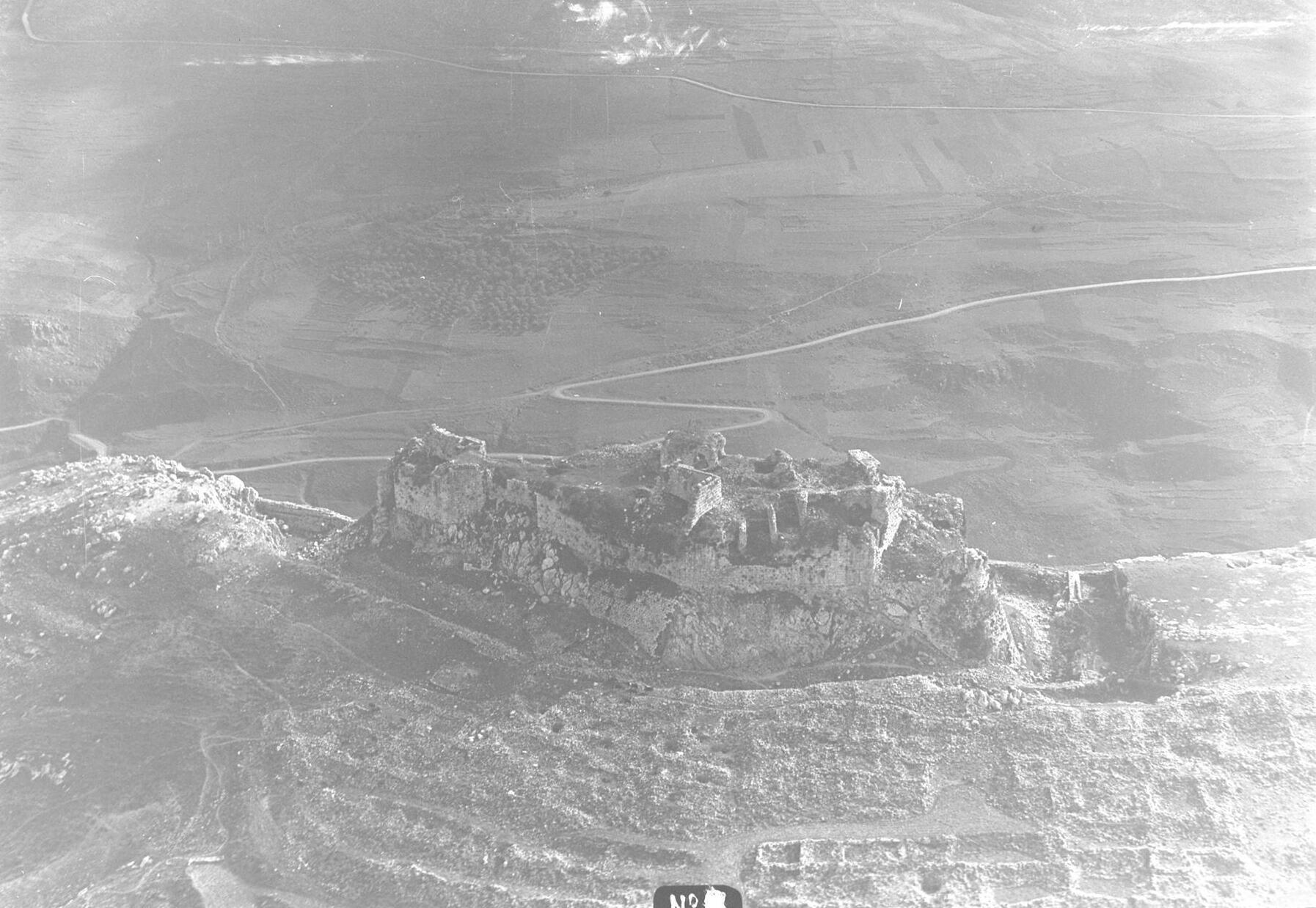
Aerial photograph of the castle in 1936

Saladin defeated the Crusaders at the Battle of Hattin in 1187. In the aftermath, many castles and cities fell to Saladin's forces and only a handful of sites remained in the hands of the Crusaders. Beaufort was one of the last castles to resist Saladin. In April 1189, Beaufort was under control of Reynald of Sidon, a survivor of the Battle of Hattin.

Arab sources describe in detail how Saladin was preparing to besiege the castle while camped at nearby Marjayoun. Reynald met him and claimed to have Muslim sympathies. He said that while he would like to hand over control of Beaufort, his family were in the Christian city of Tyre and he could not surrender until they were safely out of the city. In hopes of taking the castle without bloodshed, Saladin gave Reynald three months to extract his family from Tyre. Reynald, however, used this time to repair the castle and stock up on supplies instead. After three months Reynald met Saladin again, protesting he needed more time. Saladin insisted he hand over the castle immediately, so Reynald ordered the garrison to surrender. When they refused Reynald was taken prisoner and the siege began. Hostilities lasted until August that year when Saladin was forced to lift the siege to defend Acre. In April 1190 an agreement was reached where the castle's garrison would hand over control to Saladin in return for Reynald's release.

The castle came again under Crusader control in 1240 as part of a treaty negotiated by Theobald I of Navarre. It was sold to the Knights Templar by Reginald's grandson, Julian of Sidon, in 1260. In 1268, the Mamluk sultan Baibars captured the castle, and there was relative calm through the 14th, 15th, and 16th centuries.

=== Ottoman period ===
After the Ottoman conquest of Syria in 1516, the Ottomans attempted to revive the area by granting military benefices (timar) to Ottoman cavalry soldiers around Shaqif Arnun castle. The Shiite Sa'b family held the castles on the Ottomans behalf as early as 1571. In the early 17th century Fakhr-al-Din II took the castle as a part of his network of fortifications. Fakhr-al-Din II was defeated by the Ottomans, who destroyed the upper portions of the castle. Thereafter it was reinvested by the Sa'bs. The area was ruled by Shiite feudal families until 1769. In 1782 the Governor of Acre, Jazzar Pasha, besieged the castle, captured it and destroyed many of its remaining fortifications. The Galilee earthquake of 1837 caused further damage to the structure and from then on the ruins were used as a quarry and a shelter for sheep. The late 19th century saw the start of study of Beaufort Castle, with surveys by Victor Guérin in 1880 and Claude Reignier Conder and Herbert Kitchener in 1881 as part of the Survey of Western Palestine.

=== 20th century ===
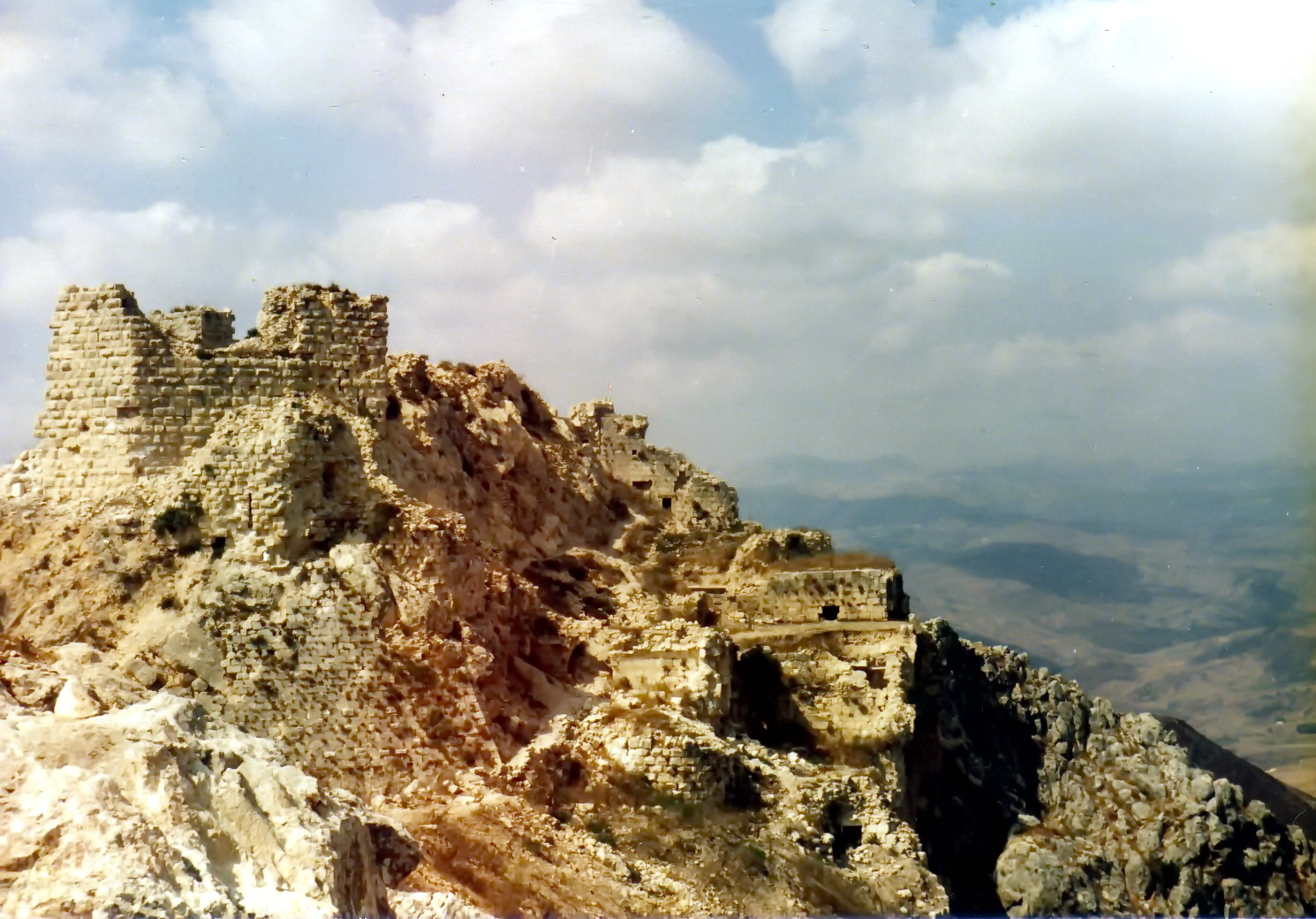
Beaufort Castle, 1982

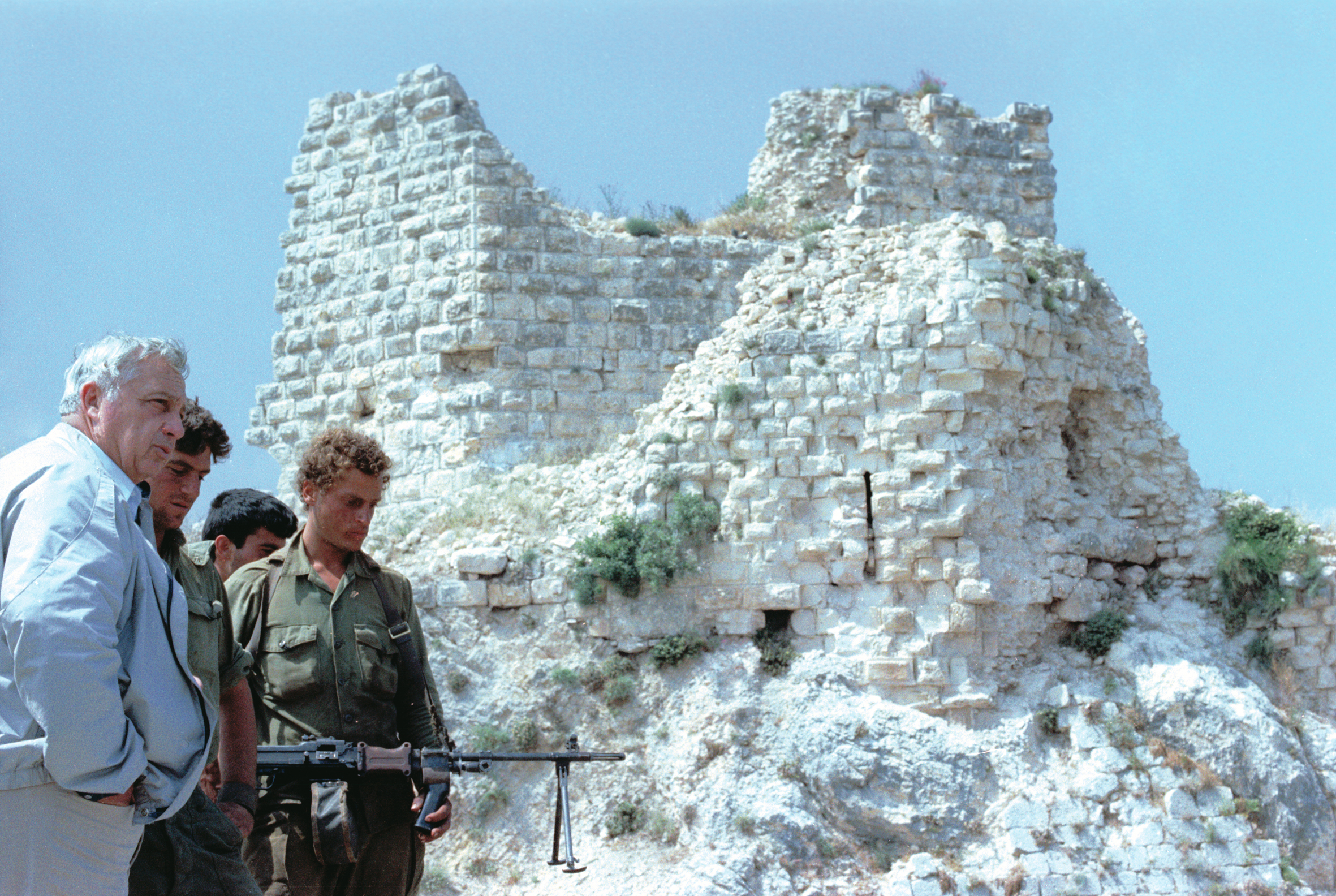
Ariel Sharon near the Beaufort Castle, 1982

T. E. Lawrence visited the castle in 1909 during his walk across modern-day Lebanon and Syria, conducting research for his thesis. He was particularly struck by the view of the coast and along the Litani River.

In 1921 the French Mandate was established and French historians and archaeologists investigated the region's history and structures. The medieval historian Paul Deschamps began studying Crusader castles in 1927 and his work influenced subsequent generations of historians of the Crusades. In 1936, nine years after he first visited Beaufort, Deschamps and architect Pierre Coupel organised 65 soldiers to clear Beaufort's inner enclosure and the keep. Kennedy, writing in 1994, highlights Deschamps' La Défense du Royaume de Jerusalem (1939) as a particularly important source in the study of Beaufort, as "his descriptions and plans record a building which has probably been mutilated beyond recognition by recent military activity". The French Mandate ended in 1943 when Lebanon became independent.

The castle's strategic location, which affords a view of much of southern Lebanon and northern Israel, has caused it to be a focus for recent conflicts. The Palestine Liberation Organization (PLO) held the castle from 1976 onwards, during the Lebanese Civil War and consequentially it was attacked by Israeli forces dozens of times within a timespan of five years.

On 6 June 1982, at the start of Operation Peace for Galilee (the 1982 Lebanon War), the PLO position on Beaufort Castle was heavily shelled by the Israelis before it was captured by the Israeli forces two days later in the Battle of the Beaufort. The fighting caused damage to the castle, and in the aftermath the Israeli army adapted the site for their own use by building a large forward operations base adjacent to the fort's western wall. As a result of the prior presence of the PLO and the fear of IEDs, Israeli soldiers manning the base were allowed to tour the upper floors of the fortress but prevented from accessing the lower parts. During the 18 years of occupation, the Beaufort castle, along with the Israeli forces, was heavily shelled by the PLO and Hezbollah. Numerous attempts were made to recapture it, primarily through the use of suicide bombings and mortars.

=== 21st century ===
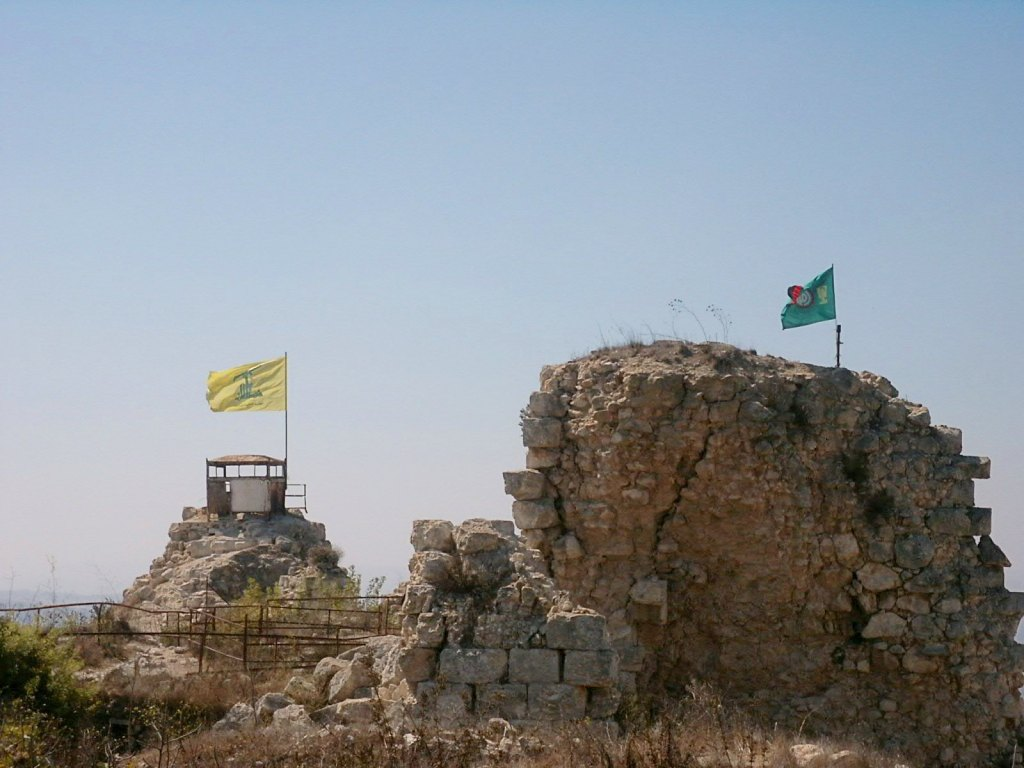
Hezbollah and Amal flags on the castle, 2003, three years after the IDF left Lebanon

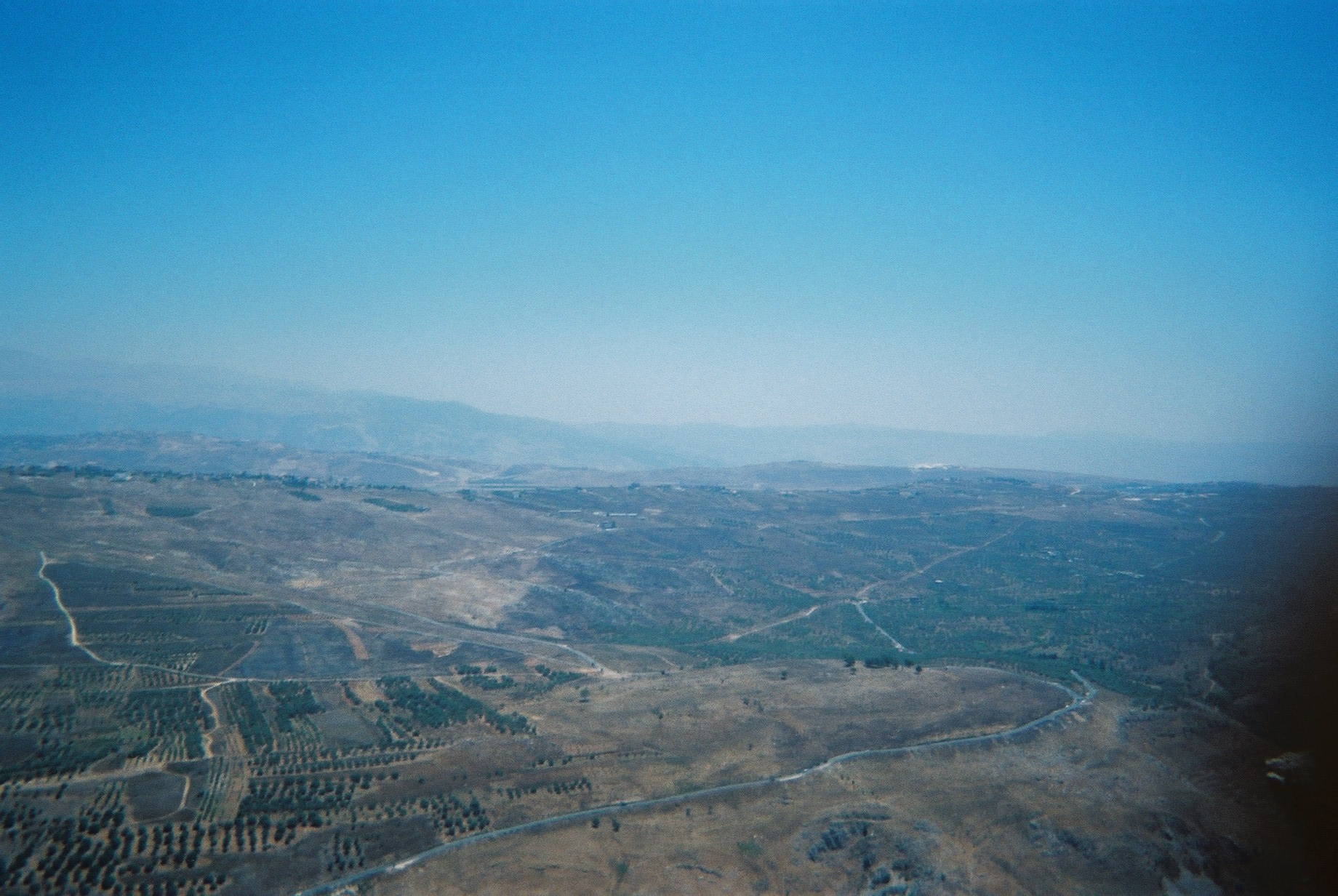
View from Beaufort Castle, 2007

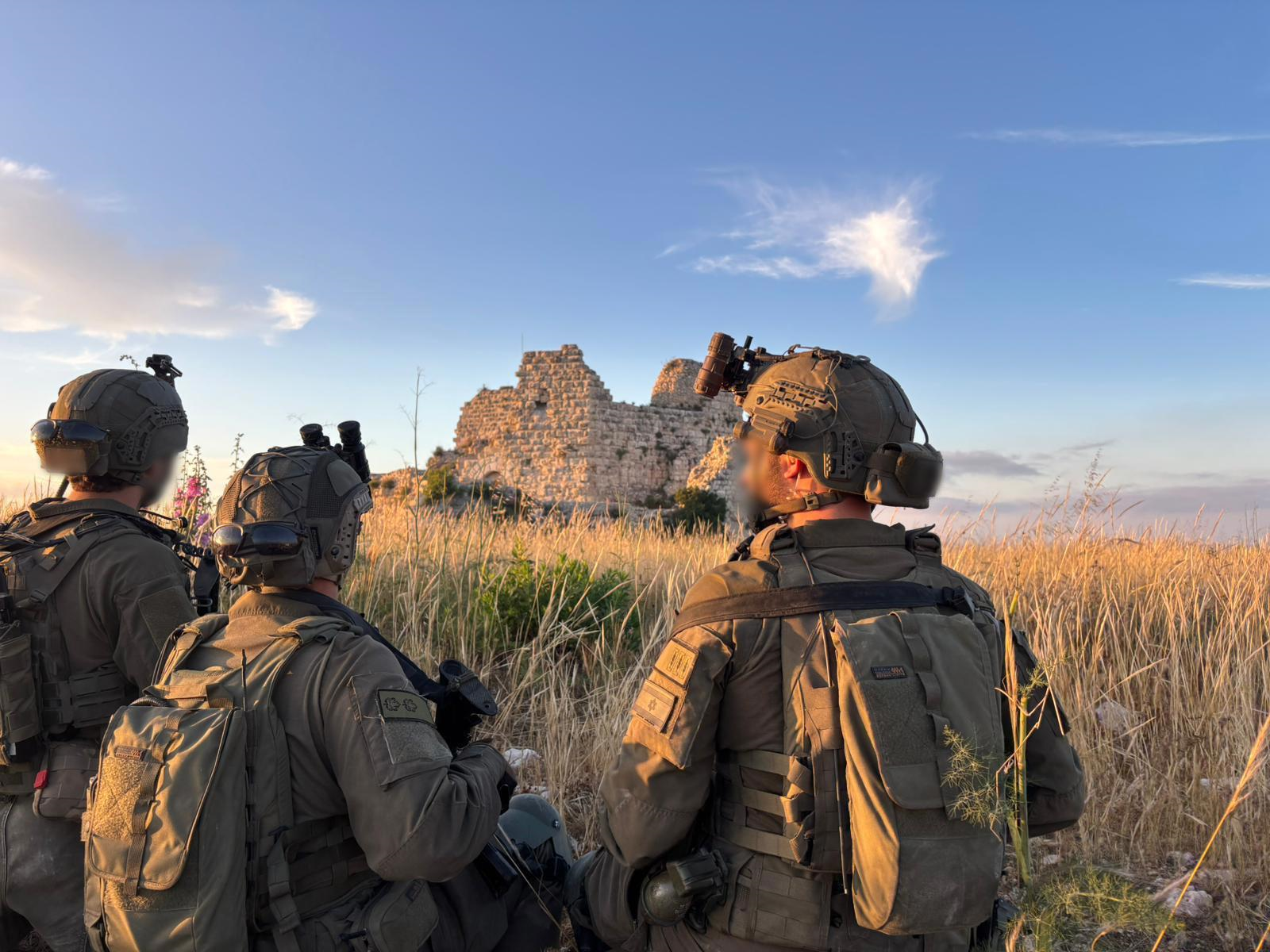
Israeli soldiers next to the castle in 2026

In 2000 the Israeli army left Beaufort, altogether demolishing the base.

The IDF control of Beaufort provides the basis of the Israeli film Beaufort, although the film itself was shot on the Golan Heights. After the Israeli withdrawal from South Lebanon, attempts by local tourism services to restore the fort began, albeit with very slow progress and lack of funding.

During the 2024 Lebanon War, UNESCO gave enhanced protection to 34 cultural sites in Lebanon including Beaufort Castle to safeguard it from damage.

During the 2026 Lebanon war, Israel struck the remains of the castle with bombs, damaging the remains directly. The Israeli military's Golani Brigade captured the castle on 31 May and raised the flag of Israel over the castle. The Israeli military later said that they captured the castle to control the area around a tunnel purportedly used by Hezbollah.

In July 2026, the Mount Amel Castles, including the Beaufort Castle, were designated by UNESCO as a World Heritage Site and immediately classified as endangered.

== Construction ==
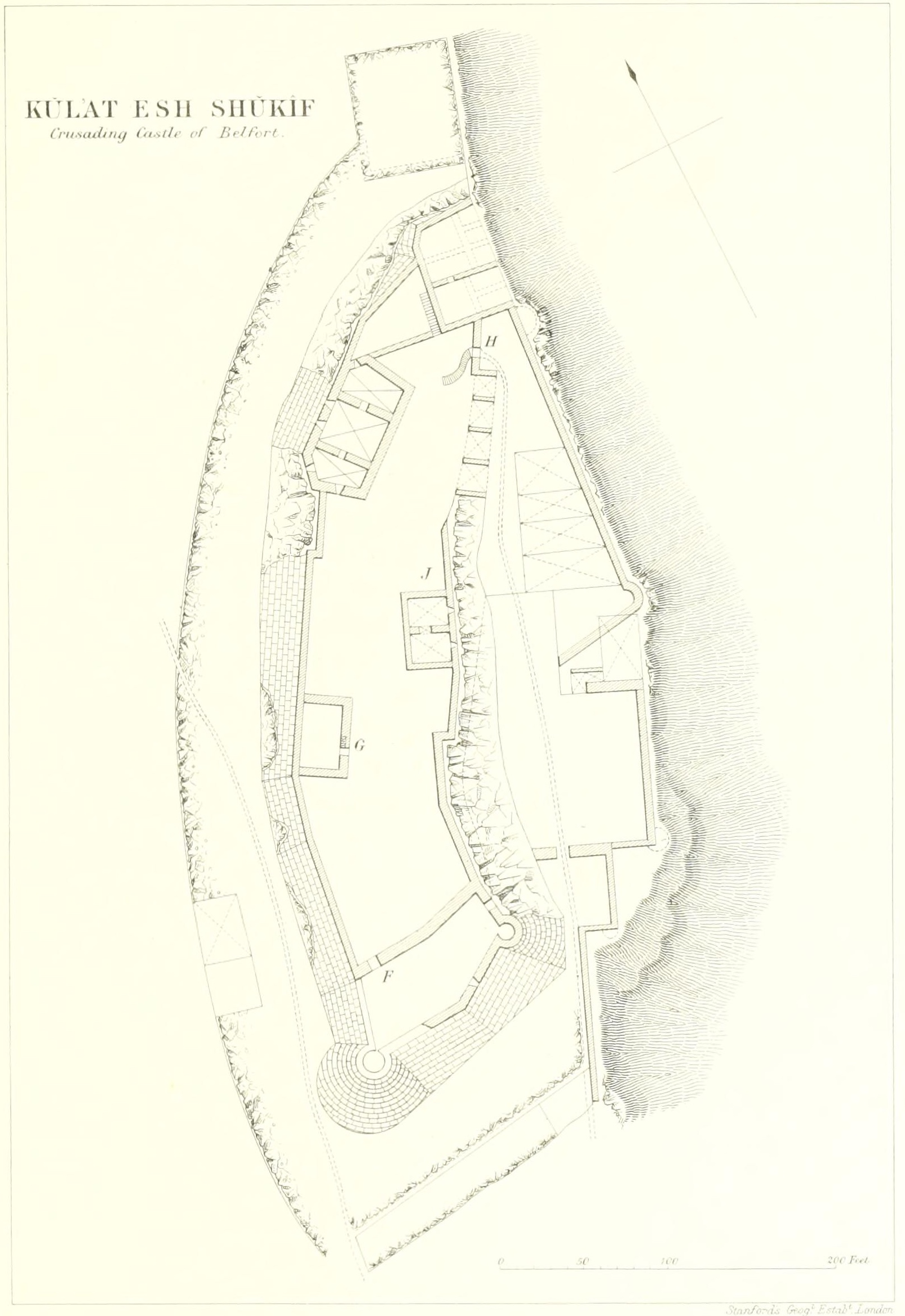
The castle in the 1871–77 PEF Survey of Palestine

Several of the great Crusader castles were built on spurs, using natural defenses and fortifying the one access point. The setting of Beaufort plays a role in the defense of the site, but the terrain is only impassable on the north side. The Kurds extended the castle to include a slightly lower shelf of rock immediately to the east of the castle, thereby removing one of the routes of attack. Divided into two wards, one occupying the lower ground to the east, the castle is roughly triangular in shape and measures about 150 by 100 metres (490 by 330 ft). A keep or great tower was built against the west wall of the upper ward; the tower has a square plan and measures about 12 by 12 metres (39 by 39 ft). While it was common for keeps in Europe to be entered through the first floor, in Syria the convention was for a ground floor entrance as can be seen at Beaufort.

== See also ==
- List of Crusader castles
