= Arnoun =

Arnoun أرنون
- Municipality
- Location within Lebanon
- Coordinates: 33°20′0″N 35°32′0″E
- Grid position: 130/155 L
- Country: Lebanon
- Governorate: Nabatieh Governorate
- District: Nabatieh District
- Elevation: 550 m (1,800 ft)
- Time zone: UTC+2 (EET)
  - Summer (DST): UTC+3 (EEST)
- Dialing code: +961

Arnoun (Arabic: أرنون, romanized: ʾArnūn, Syriac-Aramaic: ܐܪܢܘܢ) is a municipality 7 kilometres (4.3 mi) south-east of Nabatieh, in Nabatieh Governorate, southern Lebanon. The village is located approximately 8 kilometres (5.0 mi) from the Israeli border. The village is approximately 550 metres (1,800 feet) above sea level, and approximately one kilometre (0.62 miles) from the Beaufort Castle.

== History ==
Arnoun is linked to the nearby Beaufort Castle. The town's name is derived from the Aramaic arnoun, meaning "little top", referring to the highland where the Beaufort Castle stands. The castle itself was referred to as Qal'at Shqif Arnoun (Aramaic: the castle of the high rock on the hill), from which the town took its name.

In 1875 Victor Guérin noted that it contained one hundred "Metualis".

=== Modern era ===
After the establishment of the Israeli Security Zone in southern Lebanon in 1985, Arnoun lay just outside its boundaries, although, from its position at the Beaufort Castle, the Israel Defense Forces (IDF) effectively controlled the village.

==== Israeli security zone, 1999–2000 ====
Most of Arnoun's roughly 2,000 residents left in November 1998 as Hezbollah activity increased, and the IDF demolished around 22 houses in the village over the following months. On 17 February 1999, Israeli troops fenced off Arnoun and laid minefields around it, saying this was meant to curb Hezbollah guerrilla infiltration. About 35 residents remained with limited access. Israel maintained the village was already inside the security zone, not newly annexed. Hezbollah then killed a South Lebanon Army (SLA) militiaman in Jezzine and, on 22/23 February, three IDF officers in an ambush.

On 28 February, around 2,000 students and local demonstrators broke through the fence, and bulldozers reopened access the next day. The IDF held off retaking Arnoun despite its position over the supply road to the Israeli military position at Beaufort Castle. On the night of 15 April, Israeli forces re-entered and refenced the village, installing an SLA checkpoint at the entrance. Troops opened fire on approaching journalists the next day, wounding one. The IDF withdrew from Arnoun on 24 May 2000 as part of its broader pullout from southern Lebanon.

==== Middle Eastern crisis (2023–present) ====
During the ongoing Hezbollah–Israel conflict, Arnoun has been subject to several attacks. On 16 November 2024, six people were injured in a drone attack.

== Demographics ==
In 2014 Muslims made up 99.30% of registered voters in Arnoun. 97.93% of the voters were Shiite Muslims.

== Notable residents ==
- Fouad Ajami (1945–2014), Lebanese-born American university professor and writer on Middle Eastern issues
- Borhane Alaouié, film director

== Bibliography ==
- Guérin, V. (1880). Description Géographique Historique et Archéologique de la Palestine (in French). Vol. 3: Galilee, pt. 2. Paris: L'Imprimerie Nationale.
