= Ma'ariv La'noar =

Israeli weekly magazine

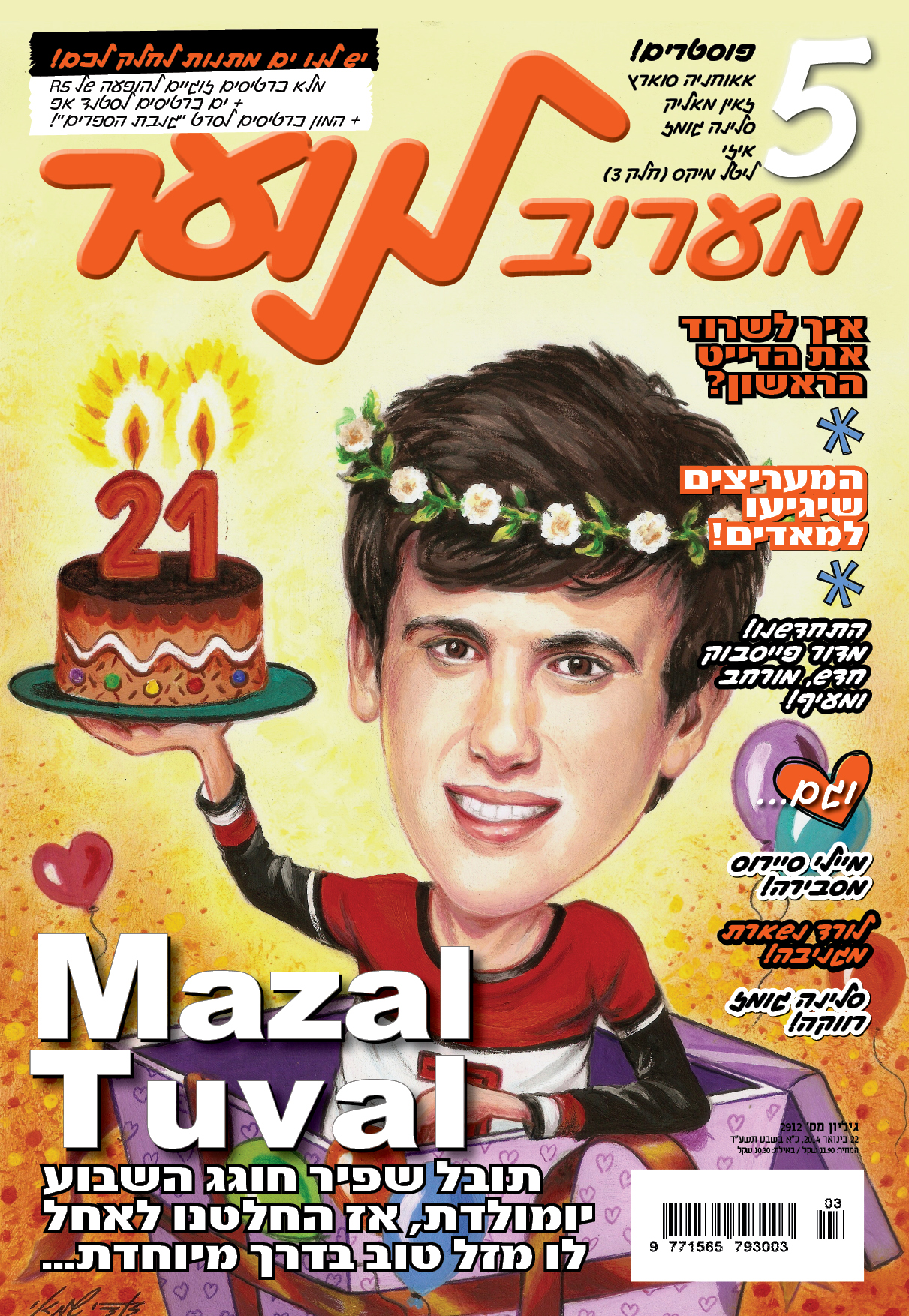
Ma'ariv La'noar cover

Ma'ariv La'noar (lit. Ma'ariv for the youth; in Hebrew: מעריב לנוער) is an Israeli weekly magazine of the Tzivlin publishing, which appeals to youth. The magazine was first published in 1958 and is considered the first magazine in Israel for youth.

In the 1980s, the weekly reached the highest circulation of all time: 100,000 copies, and was one of the two most popular magazines in Israel (alongside LaIsha). In 2006, the weekly lost the lead to its competitor, Rosh 1.
