= Golden Trailer Awards =

American annual show

- Previous: 26th Golden Trailer Awards; May 28, 2025
- Awarded for: Excellence in motion picture marketing, film trailers, posters, and television advertisement
- Country: United States
- First award: September 21, 1999
- Website: http://www.goldentrailer.com/

The Golden Trailer Awards are an American annual award show for film trailers founded in 1999. The awards also honor the best work in all areas of film and video game marketing, including posters, television advertisements and other media, in 108 categories.

It has been called "the Hollywood Awards show for the post-MTV era" and by its founders as celebrating "the people who condense 120 minutes into a two-minute minor opus."

== Overview ==
The 1st Golden Trailer Awards ceremony was held on September 21, 1999, in New York and had 19 categories. This jury consisted of Quentin Tarantino, Stephen Woolley, United Artists executive Jeff Kleeman, and Miramax executive David Kaminow. The cofounders, sisters Evelyn Watters and Monica Brady, promoted their inaugural festival by screening the nominated trailers inside a gold-painted Airstream trailer at the 2000 Sundance festival.

The ceremonies moved to Los Angeles in 2002. Notable jurors in subsequent years have included Pedro Almodovar, Joel Siegel, Ben Stiller, Benicio Del Toro, Glenn Close, and Brett Ratner; along with actors and directors with international profiles, such as Matt Smith, Navid Neghaban, Dayyan Eng, Archie Kao, Annemarie Jacir, Rob Savage, and Paula Van der Oest. Even as the ceremonies have expanded to include 108 categories (show and non-show), they have made a point of remaining short (at 70 minutes) — like the works they are recognizing. All editions have been broadcast online; more recent years have been televised on various networks including HDNet, ReelzChannel and Fox's MyNetworkTV.

Notable additions to the award list include the "Golden Fleece" award, given to the trailer that gives a bad movie the most appeal. Executive Director Evelyn Watters describes it as celebrating the "pure art of cutting"; Executive Producer Monica Brady describes it as recognizing "a great trailer for a movie that is not so great." It has also been called "the most anticipated [award] of the evening."

Hosts for the awards ceremonies have included Kathy Griffin (2002), Dennis Miller (2003), Tom Green (2004), Sinbad (2008), Natasha Leggero (2011), TJ Miller (2015) and Wayne Brady (2016, 2017). The award was designed by artist Jim Bachor.

The 9th Annual Golden Trailer Awards (broadcast as the Movie Preview Awards on MyNetworkTV), in 2008 were at the Orpheum Theatre in Los Angeles. The Dark Knight won three awards: Best Action, Best Summer Blockbuster Poster and Trailer of the Year in the public vote held by USA Today.

The 19th annual awards ceremony was held on May 31, 2018, at the Theater at Ace Hotel in Los Angeles. Michelle Buteau was host and master of ceremonies, and the presenters included Kate Flannery, Lea DeLaria, Yvette Nicole Brown, Nicole Sullivan and Missi Pyle. Paul Dergarabedian of comScore presented the Box Office Weekend Award (The Bow) to Avengers: Infinity War for the highest three day gross between May 1, 2017, and April 30, 2018.

The 26th annual awards were held at the Saban Theatre in Beverly Hills on May 28, 2026, and were hosted by comedian Morgan Jay. The Project Hail Mary trailer won Best of Show, while AV Squad was named Agency of the Year.

== 1999 ==
The 1st Golden Trailer Awards were held in 1999, the winners were:

- Best Action: The Matrix
- Best Animation/Family: A Bug's Life
- Best Art Commerce: The Matrix
- Best Comedy: Austin Powers: The Spy Who Shagged Me
- Best Documentary: Return with Honor
- Best Drama: Good Will Hunting
- Best Edit: The Matrix
- Best Foreign: Three Seasons
- Best Horror/Thriller: The Blair Witch Project
- Best Music: Out of Sight
- Best Romance: Great Expectations
- Best Trailer – No Budget: For Return of the Masterminds
- Best Voice Over: The Blair Witch Project
- Best of Show: The Matrix
- Best of the Decade: Se7en
- Most Original: Run Lola Run
- The Dark and Stormy Night: 8MM
- Trashiest: Cruel Intentions
- Golden Fleece: 8MM

== 2000s ==
Note: no ceremony was held for the year 2000.

=== 2001 ===
The 2nd Golden Trailer Award ceremony was held in 2001, winners are listed as follows:

- Best Action: Gone in Sixty Seconds tied with Vertical Limit
- Best Animation/Family: Chicken Run
- Best Art and Commerce: Crouching Tiger, Hidden Dragon
- Best Comedy: Best in Show
- Best Documentary: Running on the Sun: The Badwater 135
- Best Drama: Gladiator (for the teaser)
- Best Foreign: Billy Elliot
- Best Horror/Thriller: Unbreakable (for the teaser #1)
- Best Music: Almost Famous
- Best Romance: Crouching Tiger, Hidden Dragon (for the trailer)
- Best Trailer – No Budget: The Big Split
- Best Trailer – No Movie: "AKA"
- Best Voice Over: Valentine
- Best of Show: Requiem for a Dream
- Most Original: Book of Shadows: Blair Witch 2
- The Dark and Stormy Night: Hollow Man
- Trashiest: A Table for One
- Best Title Sequence: Bedazzled
- Golden Fleece: Hollow Man

=== 2002 ===
The 3rd Golden Trailer Award ceremony was held in 2002, the winners were:

- Best Action: A Knight's Tale
- Best Animation/Family: Monsters, Inc.
- Best Comedy: The Royal Tenenbaums
- Best Documentary: Go Tigers!
- Best Drama: Memento
- Best Foreign: Amelie
- Best Independent: Series 7: The Contenders (for the redband trailer)
- Best Music: The Royal Tenenbaums
- Best Romance: Moulin Rouge! (for "Love Story")
- Best Trailer – No Movie: "Wedding Album"
- Best Voice Over: Spider-Man
- Best of Show: The Royal Tenenbaums
- Most Original: Memento
- Trashiest: Series 7: The Contenders (for the redband trailer)
- Best Horror/Thriller: Panic Room
- Best Title Sequence: ?
- Golden Fleece: The Business of Strangers

=== 2003 ===
The 4th Golden Trailer Award ceremony was held in 2003, the winners were:

- Best Action: The Lord of the Rings: The Two Towers (for "Sacrifice")
- Best Animation/Family: Spirited Away
- Best Comedy: About Schmidt (for the teaser)
- Best Documentary: Bowling for Columbine
- Best Drama: The Hours
- Best Foreign: Read My Lips
- Best Horror/Thriller: The Ring
- Best Independent: Read My Lips
- Best Music: About Schmidt (for the teaser)
- Best Romance: Secretary
- Best Trailer – No Movie: "Twelve Twisted Tricks"
- Best Voice Over: About Schmidt (for the teaser)
- Best of Show: About Schmidt (for the teaser)
- Most Original: The Ring
- Trashiest: The Rules of Attraction
- Golden Fleece: Blue Crush

=== 2004 ===
5th Golden Trailer Award ceremony was held in 2004, the winners were:

- Best Action: Charlie's Angels: Full Throttle
- Best Animation/Family: Harry Potter and the Prison of Azkaban (for the teaser #2)
- Best Comedy: Elf
- Best Documentary: Spellbound
- Best Drama: The Lord of the Rings: The Return of the King (for the trailer #1)
- Best Foreign: Osama
- Best Foreign Independent: City of God
- Best Horror/Thriller: Dawn of the Dead
- Best Independent: Lost in Translation
- Best Music: The Triplets of Belleville
- Best Romance: The Cooler
- Best Trailer – No Movie: "Revolver"
- Best Voice Over: 21 Grams (voice over talent: Sean Penn)
- Best Show: The Stepford Wives (for the teaser)
- Most Original: The Stepford Wives (for the teaser)
- Summer 2004 Blockbuster: The Stepford Wives (for the teaser)
- Trashiest: A Miami Tail
- Golden Fleece: Northfork

=== 2005 ===
6th Golden Trailer Award ceremony was held in 2005, the winners were:

- Best Action: War of the Worlds
- Best Animation/Family: The Incredibles (for "Buckle Up")
- Best Comedy: Napoleon Dynamite
- Best Documentary: Fahrenheit 9/11
- Best Drama: Collateral
- Best Foreign: House of Flying Daggers (original title Shi mian mai fu)
- Best Foreign Independent: House of Flying Daggers (original title Shi mian mai fu)
- Best Horror: The Amityville Horror (for "Get Out")
- Best Independent: I Heart Huckabees
- Best Music: Garden State (for the trailer)
- Best Romance: A Very Long Engagement (original title Un long dimanche de fiancailles)
- Best Thriller: Open Water
- Best Trailer – No Movie: Empire Design (for "Fela Kuti")
- Best Video Game Trailer: Medal of Honor: Pacific Assault
- Best Voice Over: The Motorcycle Diaries (original title Diarios de motocicleta)
- Most Original: The Hitchhicker's Guide to the Galaxy
- Summer 2005 Blockbuster: War of the Worlds
- Trashiest: A Dirty Shame
- Golden Fleece: White Noise

=== 2006 ===
7th Golden Trailer Award ceremony was held in 2006, the winners were:

- Best Action: Mission: Impossible III
- Best Animation/Family: Harry Potter and the Goblet of Fire
- Best Comedy: Wedding Crashers(for "The Masters")
- Best Documentary: March of the Penguins (original title La marche de l'empereur)
- Best Drama: Good Night, and Good Luck.
- Best Foreign Action Trailer: District B13 (original title Banlieue 13) tied with Oldboy (original title Oldeuboi)
- Best Foreign Comedy Trailer: FC Venus
- Best Foreign Dramatic Trailer: Paradise Now
- Best Foreign Romance Trailer: The Tiger and the Snow (original title La tigre e la neve)
- Best Horror: The Exorcism of Emily Rose
- Best Independent: Transamerica
- Best Music: Happy Feet
- Best Romance: Pride & Prejudice
- Best Sound Editing in a Trailer: Domino (for the teaser #1)
- Best Thriller: Match Point
- Best Titles in a Trailer: Brick
- Best Trailer – No Movie: 5-25-77 (original title '77)
- Best Video Game Trailer: The Godfather
- Best Voice Over: March of the Penguins (original title La marche de l'empereur)
- Best Show: Mission: Impossible III
- Most Original: Thank You for Smoking
- Most Original Foreign Trailer: Look Both Ways
- Summer 2006 Blockbuster: Mission: Impossible III
- Trashiest: Survival Island (original title Three)
- Golden Fleece: Into the Blue
- Special Audience: Beer League (for the trashiest trailer)

=== 2007 ===
8th Golden Trailer Award ceremony was held in 2007, the winners were:

- Best Action: 300
- Best Documentary: This Film Is Not Yet Rated
- Best Independent: The Science of Sleep (original title La science des reves)
- Best Thriller: The Descent
- Best of Show: 300
- Trashiest: Another Gay Movie
- Golden Fleece: Fur: An Imaginary Portrait of Diane Arbus
- Summer Blockbuster: Harry Potter and the Order of the Phoenix

=== 2008 ===
9th Golden Trailer Award ceremony was held in 2008, the winners were:

- Best Action: The Dark Knight
- Best Action Poster: Resident Evil: Extinction
- Best Action TV Spot: The Bourne Ultimatum (for "I Remember")
- Best Animation/Family: Enchanted
- Best Animation/Family Poster: Shrek the Third (for the teaser poster)
- Best Animation/Family TV Spot: Harry Potter and the Order of the Phoenix (for "Great Wizards")
- Best Anime Trailer: Doctor Strange
- Best Comedy: Tropic Thunder
- Best Comedy Poster: Step Brothers (for the one sheet)
- Best Comedy TV Spot: Harold & Kumar Escape from Guantanamo Bay (for "Campaign")
- Best Documentary: Where in the World Is Osama Bin Laden?
- Best Documentary Poster: Religious (for "Toast")
- Best Drama: No Country for Old Men
- Best Drama Poster: The Assassination of Jesse James by the Coward Robert Ford (for the one sheet)
- Best Drama TV Spot: There Will Be Blood (for "Music Review")
- Best Foreign Action Trailer: Revolver
- Best Foreign Comedy Trailer: My Best Friend (original title Mon meilleur ami)
- Best Foreign Drama Trailer: When Did You Last See Your Father? (original title And When Did You Last See Your Father?")
- Best Foreign Horror/Thriller Trailer: The Eye 3 (original title "Gin gwai")
- Best Foreign Romance Trailer: Paris, je t'aime (for "The Dance")
- Best Horror: I Am Legend
- Best Horror Poster: The Eye (for the one sheet)
- Best Horror TV Spot: Saw IV (for "Clown Blinks")
- Best In-Theater Advertising: Mad Men
- Best Independent Poster: Before the Devil Knows You're Dead
- Best Independent Trailer: Day Night Day Night
- Best International Poster: Trade
- Best Motion/Title Graphics: Hitman
- Best Music: The Diving Bell and the Butterfly (original title Le scaphandre et le papillon)
- Best Romance: Atonement
- Best Romance Poster: 27 Dresses (for the one sheet)
- Best Romance TV Spot: 27 Dresses (for "Invite Event")
- Best Sound Editing: I Am Legend
- Best Summer 2008 Blockbuster Poster: The Dark Knight (for the teaser)
- Best Summer 2008 TV Spot: Wanted (for "Choice Revised")
- Best Teaser Poster: Fantastic 4: Rise of the Silver Surfer (for the teaser)
- Best Thriller: Vantage Point
- Best Thriller Poster: Untraceable (for "Diane")
- Best Thriller TV Spot: No Country for Old Men (for "Friend-o")
- Best Trailer – No Movie: Gamer
- Best Video Game Trailer: The Simpsons Game
- Best Voice Over: The Assassination of Jesse James by the Coward Robert Ford
- Best Wildposts: Forgetting Sarah Marshall (for "Wild Posts")
- Most Original: In Bruges
- Most Original Foreign Trailer: Persepolis (for trailer #2)
- Most Original Poster: Rambo (for "Stencil")
- Most Original TV Spot: Shrek the Third (for "Shrekstra #1")
- Summer 2008 Blockbuster: Iron Man (for "Escaped")
- Trashiest Trailer: Drive Thru
- Golden Fleece: Awake

=== 2009 ===
10th Golden Trailer Award ceremony was held in 2009, the winners were:

- Best Summer 2009 Blockbuster Poster: Star Trek (for the "Final One Sheet")
- Best Summer 2009 TV Spot: Star Trek (for "Dare")
- Best in Show: Star Trek
- Summer 2009 Blockbuster: Star Trek
- Best Film Festival Trailer: New York, I Love You
- Best Independent Trailer: Happy-Go-Lucky
- Best Music: Star Trek

== 2010s ==
=== 2010 ===
11th Golden Trailer Award ceremony award was held in 2010, the winners were:

- Best Independent Trailer: A Serious Man (for trailer #3)
- Best Sound Editing: A Serious Man (for trailer #3)
- Best Summer 2010 Blockbuster Poster: Inception (for "Maze")
- Most Innovative Advertising for a Feature Film: Avatar (for "Planet Pandora")
- Best Action: Avatar (for "Theatrical Trailer")
- Best Action TV Spot: Avatar (for "Kansas")
- Best Animation/Family: How to Train Your Dragon (for "Prepare" trailer #3)
- Best Summer Blockbuster 2010 TV Spot: The Last Airbender (for "Chosen")
- Best in Show: A Serious Man (for trailer #3)
- Most Innovative Advertising for a Brand/Product: The Sound of Music (for "Entertainment Trailer")
- Most Original: A Serious Man (for trailer #3)
- Most Original Poster: Inception (for "Maze")
- Summer 2010 Blockbuster: Inception (for "City")

=== 2011 ===
12th Golden Trailer Award ceremony was held in 2011, the winners were:

- Best Foreign/International Poster: You Will Meet a Tall Dark Stranger
- Best Independent: The Tree of Life
- Best Summer 2011 Blockbuster Trailer: Transformers: Dark of the Moon
- Best Foreign Drama Trailer: Empire of Silver (original title Bai yin di guo)
- Best Foreign Romance Trailer: Empire of Silver (original title Bai yin di guo)
- Best Horror: The Rite
- Best of Show: The Tree of Life
- Most Original: The Tree of Life

=== 2012 ===
13th Golden Trailer Award ceremony was held in 2012, the winners were:

- Best Action: Snow White and the Huntsman (for "Forever")
- Best Action Poster: The Hunger Games (for teaser poster)
- Best Action TV Spot: Sherlock Holmes: A Game of Shadows (for "Beat")
- Best Animation/Family: The Muppets (for "Their Movie")
- Best Animation/Family Poster: The Hunger Games (for "Final Poster")
- Best Animation/Family TV Spot: Puss in Boots (for "Curiosity")
- Best Anime Trailer: The Secret World of Arrietty (original title Kari-gurashi no Arietti) (for "Stand Tall")
- Best Comedy: Bridesmaids (for redband trailer)
- Best Comedy Poster: The Hangover Part II (for "One Sheet")
- Best Comedy TV Spot: 21 Jump Street (for "Arrest")
- Best Documentary: George Harrison: Living in The Material World
- Best Documentary Poster: Something from Nothing: The Art of Rap
- Best Drama: The Girl with the Dragon Tattoo
- Best Drama Poster: The Ides of March (for "One Sheet")
- Best Drama TV Spot: Extremely Loud & Incredibly Close (for "Messages")
- Best Foreign Action Trailer: Elite Squad: The Enemy Within (original title Tropa de Elite 2: O Inimigo Agora e Outro)
- Best Foreign Animation/Family Trailer: The Secret World of Arrietty (original title Kari-gurashi no Arietti) (for "UK trailer")
- Best Foreign Comedy Trailer: The Untouchables (original title Intouchables)
- Best Foreign Documentary Trailer: Anton Corbijn Inside Out
- Best Graphics in a TV Spot: Martha Marcy May Marlene (for "Review")
- Best Horror: The Devil Inside (for "Who")
- Best Horror Poster: Scream 4
- Best Horror TV Spot: The Cabin in the Woods (for "Secret")
- Best Independent: Take Shelter
- Best Independent Poster: Tinker Tailor Toy Soldier Spy (for "One Sheet")
- Best Independent TV Spot: The Artist (for ":60 Spotlight")
- Best International Poster: The Dark Knight Rises (for UK Quad")
- Best Motion/Title Graphics: Anonymous (for domestic trailer #2)
- Best Music: Another Earth
- Best Pre-Show Theatrical Advertising: 21 Jump Street (for "In Theater NCM")
- Best Romance: Like Crazy
- Best Romance Poster: The Lucky One (for "One Sheet")
- Best Romance TV Spot: The Vow (for "Forever")
- Best Sound Editing: The Woman in Black (for "Darkness")
- Best Standee for Feature Film: The Hunger Games
- Best Summer 2012 Blockbuster Poster: The Dark Knight Rises (for teaser one sheet "City")
- Best Summer Blockbuster 2012 TV Spot: Snow White and the Huntsman (for "Ravenna")
- Best Teaser Poster: The Hunger Games (for teaser poster)
- Best Thriller: The Grey (for "Teeth Redband")
- Best Thriller Poster: The Ides of March (for "One Sheet")
- Best Thriller TV Spot: Contagion
- Best Trailer – No Movie: Babylon
- Best Video Game Trailer: The Witcher 2: Assassins of Kings (original title Wiedzmin 2: Zabojcy krolow)
- Best Voice Over: Final Destination 5 (for "Die Again")
- Best Wildposts: Drive (for "Vertical Campaign")
- Best in Show: The Dark Knight Rises (for "Chant")
- Most Innovative Advertising for a Feature Film: Shame (for "Alternative Newspaper Ad")
- Most Innovative Advertising for a Brand/Product: The Hunger Games (for "Faux Motion Ad – Smile Away")
- Most Innovative Advertising for a Feature Film: Shame (for Alternative Newspaper Ad")
- Most Original Poster: The Ides of March (for "One Sheet")
- Most Original TV Spot: The Descendants (for "Paradise")
- Most Original Trailer: Chronicle (for "Camera")
- Summer 2012 Blockbuster Trailer: The Dark Knight Rises (for "Chant")
- The Don LaFontaine Award for Best Voice Over: The Secret World of Arrietty (original title Kari-gurashi no Arietti) (for "UK Trailer")
- Trashiest Poster: Piranha 3DD
- Trashiest Trailer: Piranha 3DD
- Golden Fleece: Apollo 18 (for "Classified")

=== 2013 ===
14th Golden Trailer Award ceremony was held in 2013, the winners were:

- Best Action: Skyfall (for domestic trailer)
- Best Action Poster: The Expendables 2 (for "Last Supper")
- Best Action TV Spot: Fast & Furious 6 (for "Breathe" Super Bowl trailer)
- Best Animation/Family: Wreck-It-Ralph (for "Dreams")
- Best Animation/Family Poster: Life of Pi (for "Mosaic")
- Best Animation/Family TV Spot: Monsters University (for "College AD Imagine")
- Best Comedy: The Hangover Part III (for teaser trailer)
- Best Comedy Poster: Ted
- Best Comedy TV Spot: Ted (for "Name Game")
- Best Documentary: Brooklyn Castle
- Best Documentary Poster: The House I Live In
- Best Drama: Argo
- Best Drama Poster: Argo
- Best Drama TV Spot: Lincoln (for "Vote")
- Best Film Festival Poster: The Last Stand (for "New York Comic-Con" poster)
- Best Film Festival Trailer: Kinetic Imageworkds (for 50th New York Film Festival)
- Best Foreign Action Trailer: The Thieves (original title Dodookdeul)
- Best Foreign Animation/Family Trailer: From Up on Puppy Hill (original title Kokuriko-zaka kara)
- Best Foreign Documentary Trailer: The Gatekeeper
- Best Foreign Drama Trailer: Unfinished Song (original title Song for Marion)
- Best Foreign Graphics Trailer: Painted Skin: The Resurrection (original title Hua pi 2)
- Best Foreign Horror/Thriller Trailer: The Awakening
- Best Foreign Poster: Mabo
- Best Foreign Romance Trailer: Treading Water (original title The Boy Who Smells Like Fish)
- Best Foreign TV Spot: Rust and Bone (original title De rouille et d'os) (for "Sexy Action")
- Best Graphic Design in a TV Spot: The Expendables 2 (for "Tank Review")
- Best Horror: Mama (for "Forever")
- Best Horror Poster: The Last Exorcism Part II (for "Backhend")
- Best Horror TV Spot: Sinister (for "No One")
- Best Independent Poster: Beasts of the Southern Wild
- Best Independent TV Spot: End of Watch (for "Sound Review")
- Best Independent Trailer: Silver Linings Playbook (for "Never Met")
- Best International Poster: Skyfall
- Best Motion/Title Graphics: Argo
- Best Music: Les Misérables (for "I Dreamed a Dream")
- Best Music TV Spot: Django Unchained (for "Unchained BET")
- Best Original Score: Skyfall (for teaser trailer)
- Best Pre-Show Theatrical Advertising: A Good Day to Die Hard (for "Go Big Regal")
- Best Romance: Silver Linings Playbook
- Best Romance Poster: Safe Haven (for one sheet)
- Best Romance TV Spot: Safe Haven (for "Secret")
- Best Sound Editing: Flight (for "Impact Review")
- Best Summer 2013 Blockbuster Poster: Man of Steel
- Best Summer Blockbuster 2013 TV Spot: Fast & Furious 6 (for "Breathe" Super Bowl trailer)
- Best Teaser Poster: A Good Day to Die Hard
- Best Thriller: Trance (for domestic trailer C)
- Best Thriller Poster: Trance
- Best Thriller TV Spot: Dredd (for "Big Addicted")
- Best Video Game Poster: Tomb Raider (for "Tomb Raider")
- Best Video Game TV Spot: Need for Speed: Hot Pursuit 2 (for "Showdown Accolades")
- Best Video Game Trailer: Tomb Raider (for "Tri 3 Survivor")
- Best Voice Over TV Spot: Hansel & Gretel: Witch Hunters (for "Brutal")
- Best Wildposts: The Incredible Burt Wonderstone
- Best in Show: Iron Man 3 (for "Not Afraid")
- Most Innovative Advertising for a Feature Film: The Campaign (for "Cam Dollar")
- Most Original Foreign Trailer: Kill Me Please
- Most Original Poster: Texas Chainsaw 3D (for Special Screening Long Shot")
- Most Original TV Spot: Brave (for Mother's Day: 60")
- Most Original Trailer: Monsters University (for "Admissions")
- Summer 2013 Blockbuster Trailer: Iron Man 3 (for "Not Afraid")
- The Don LaFontaine Award for Best Voice Over: John Dies at the End
- Trashiest Poster: A Haunted House
- Trashiest Trailer: Spring Breakers
- Golden Fleece: Hit and Run (for greenband trailer)

=== 2014 ===
15th Golden Trailer Award ceremony was held in 2014, the winners were:

- Best Action: The Hunger Games: Catching Fire (for the trailer "World Event")
- Best Action Poster: The Hunger Games: Catching Fire
- Best Action TV Spot: Captain America: The Winter Soldier (for "The World 60")
- Best Animation/Family: Frozen (for "The Time Is Forever" trailer)
- Best Animation/Family Poster: Despicable Me 2 (for Side by Side Billboard" poster)
- Best Animation/Family TV Spot: The Lego Movie (for "Special Cast")
- Best Comedy: Bad Words (for redband trailer)
- Best Comedy Poster: Neighbors (for teaser poster)
- Best Comedy TV Spot: Neighbors (for "Mad Neighbors")
- Best Documentary: Blackfish
- Best Documentary Poster: Muscle Shoals
- Best Documentary TV Spot: The Armstrong Lie (for "Ride 60")
- Best Drama: Lee Daniel's The Butler
- Best Drama Poster: Gravity
- Best Drama TV Spot: Rush (for "Mark:60")
- Best Fantasy Adventure: Maleficent (for trailer featuring Lana Del Rey's version of "Once Upon a Dream")
- Best Fantasy/Adventure TV Spot: Star Trek: Into Darkness (for "Go:30")
- Best Foreign Action Trailer: Warrior King 2 (original title Tom yum goong 2) (for "Revenge")
- Best Foreign Animation/Family Trailer: Ernest & Celestine (original title Ernest et Celestine)
- Best Foreign Comedy Trailer: Hector and the Search for Happiness (for the international theatrical trailer)
- Best Foreign Documentary Trailer: Hawking
- Best Foreign Drama: Ida
- Best Foreign Graphics in a Trailer: Journey to the West (original title Xi you: Xiang mo pian) (for "Demons")
- Best Foreign Horror/Thriller Trailer: The Babadook
- Best Foreign Poster: Roxanne
- Best Foreign Romance Trailer: Dirty Weekend (original title Le Weekend)
- Best Foreign TV Spot: The Wind Rises (original title Kaze tachinu) (for "Hayao Miyazaki – Visionary 30")
- Best Graphics in a TV Spot: The Grand Budapest Hotel (for "30TV Dynamite")
- Best Horror: The Conjuring (for "Case")
- Best Horror Poster: You're Next
- Best Horror TV Spot: The Conjuring (for "Event Review")
- Best Independent Poster: 12 Years a Slave (for theatrical release poster)
- Best Independent TV Spot: 12 Years a Slave (for "Fight Back")
- Best Independent Trailer: Dallas Buyers Club (for trailer #1/theatrical trailer)
- Best International Poster: Godzilla
- Best Motion Poster: 2 Guns
- Best Motion/Title Graphics: Transcendence (for "Singularity")
- Best Music: The Secret Life of Walter Mitty (for "Dirty Paws" by Of Monsters and Men in theatrical trail #1)
- Best Music TV Spot: Frozen (for "Let It Go" Review – Disney's Frozen Holiday trailer)
- Best Original Score: The Hunger Games: Catching Fire (for theatrical trailer #4)
- Best Pre-Show Theatrical Advertising for a Band: White House Down (for "NCW")
- Best Romance: The Fault in Our Stars
- Best Romance Poster: About Time
- Best Romance TV Spot: The Great Gatsby (for "You and Me")
- Best Sound Editing: Into the Storm (for teaser trailer)
- Best Standee for a Feature Film: Despicable Me 2 (for "Whack-a-Minion")
- Best Summer 2014 Blockbuster Poster: Godzilla
- Best Summer Blockbuster 2014 TV Spot: Godzilla (for "Flight")
- Best Teaser Poster: The Purge: Anarchy
- Best Thriller: Gravity (for "Detached")
- Best Thriller Poster: You're Next (for Comic Con poster)
- Best Thriller TV Spot: Gravity (for "No Escape")
- Best Video Game Poster: Need for Speed: Rivals
- Best Video Game TV Spot: Diablo III: Reaper of Souls (for "Face Off")
- Best Vine: Sabotage (for "Kill #18")
- Best Viral Video of Campaign: Muppets Most Wanted (for "Watched the Commercials Extended Online")
- Best Voice Over TV Spot: RoboCop (for "60Infomerical")
- Best Wildposts: The Hunger Games: Catching Fire (for teaser outdoor poster)
- Best in Show: Gravity (for "Detached")
- Most Innovative Advertising for a Brand/Product: The Lego Movie (for "Behind the Bricks")
- Most Innovative Advertising for a Feature Film: The Wolf of Wall Street (for "Marty Party")
- Most Innovative Advertising for a Video Game: Yaiba: Ninja Gaiden Z (for "Load of Shit")
- Most Original Foreign Trailer: The Turning
- Most Original Poster: You're Next (for "Graffiti Billboard" poster)
- Most Original TV Spot: Muppets Most Wanted (for "Across the Internet")
- Most Original Trailer: This Is the End (for "April Fools" trailer)
- Trashiest Poster: Lovelace
- Trashiest Trailer: Bad Milo (original title Bad Milo!)
- Best Summer 2014 Blockbuster Trailer: Edge of Tomorrow (for "Converge")
- Best Video Game: Assassin's Creed IV: Black Flag – Freedom Cry (for "Launch" trailer)
- The Don LaFontaine Award for Best Voice Over: Don Jon (for trailer #1)
- Golden Fleece: The Fifth Estate (for "The Future")
- Don LaFontaine Award for Best Voice Over: The Heat (for "Can You Dig It?")

=== 2015 ===
16th Golden Trailer Award ceremony was held in 2015, the winners were:

- Best Action: Furious 7
- Best Action Poster: The Expendables 3
- Best Animation/Family: Big Hero 6
- Best Animation/Family Poster: Minions
- Best Animation/Family TV Spot: Big Hero 6
- Best Billboard: Insurgent
- Best Comedy: Ted 2
- Best Comedy Poster: Ted 2
- Best Comedy TV Spot: Ted 2
- Best Documentary: Life Itself
- Best Documentary Poster: Whitey: United States of America v. James J. Bulger
- Best Documentary TV Spot: Monkey Kingdom
- Best Drama: Selma
- Best Drama Poster: American Sniper
- Best Drama TV Spot: American Sniper
- Best Fantasy/Adventure Poster: The Hunger Games: Mockingjay – Part 1
- Best Fantasy/Adventure: The Hunger Games: Mockingjay – Part 1
- Best Fantasy/Adventure TV Spot: Guardians of the Galaxy
- Best Foreign Action Trailer: Grandmaster
- Best Foreign Animation/Family Trailer: Shaun the Sheep Movie
- Best Foreign Comedy Trailer: The Bachelor (original title The Stag)
- Best Foreign Documentary Trailer: Dark Horse
- Best Foreign Drama Trailer: The Imitation Game
- Best Foreign Graphics in a Trailer: The Babadook
- Best Foreign Horror Trailer: Hollow (original title Doat hon)
- Best Foreign Poster: '71
- Best Foreign Romance Trailer: Far from the Madding Crowd
- Best Foreign TV Spot: Ex Machina
- Best Foreign Thriller Trailer: Ex Machina
- Best Graphics in a TV Spot: Nightcrawler
- Best Horror: The Woman in Black 2: Angel of Death
- Best Horror Poster: Dracula Untold
- Best Horror TV Spot: The Woman in Black 2: Angel of Death
- Best Independent: Boyhood
- Best Independent Poster: Cut Bank
- Best Independent TV Spot: The Drop
- Best International Poster: As Above, So Below
- Best Motion Poster: Deliver Us from Evil
- Best Music: Guardians of the Galaxy
- Best Music TV Spot: American Sniper
- Best Original Score: Interstellar
- Best Original Score TV Spot: The Hunger Games: Mockingjay – Part 1
- Best Pre-Show Theatrical Advertising for a Brand: Big Hero 6
- Best Romance: Paper Towns
- Best Romance Poster: The Age of Adaline
- Best Romance TV Spot: If I Stay
- Best Sound Editing: Avengers: Age of Ultron
- Best Summer 2015 Blockbuster: Avengers: Age of Ultron
- Best Summer Blockbuster Poster: Minions
- Best Summer Blockbuster TV Spot: Jurassic World
- Best Teaser: Interstellar
- Best Teaser Poster: The Hunger Games: Mockingjay – Part 1
- Best Thriller: American Sniper
- Best Thriller Poster: John Wick
- Best Thriller TV Spot: American Sniper
- Best Trailer/Teaser for a TV Series/Miniseries: Game of Thrones
- Best Viral Campaign: Into the Storm
- Best Voice Over TV Spot: McFarland, USA
- Best Wildposts: The Hunger Games: Mockingjay – Part 1
- Best in Show: Furious 7
- Don LaFontaine Award for Best Voice Over: Inherent Vice
- Golden Fleece: The Giver
- Most Innovating Advertising for a Feature Film: These Final Hours
- Most Original Foreign Trailer: Hyena
- Most Original Poster: Kill the Messenger
- Most Original Trailer: Mad Max: Fury Road
- Trashiest Trailer: Buzzard
- Best Action TV Spot: Alexander and the Terrible, Horrible, Bo Good, Very Bad Day
- Most Original TV Spot: The Hunger Games: Mockingjay – Part 1
- The Don LaFontaine Award for Best Voice Over: Birdman or (The Unexpected Virtue of Ignorance)
- Golden Fleece – Best Action TV Spot: Furious 7
- Golden Fleece – Best Documentary Poster: Whitey: United States of America v. James J. Bulger

=== 2016 ===
17th Golden Trailer Award ceremony was held in 2016, the winners were:

- Best Action: Deadpool
- Best Action Poster: Star Wars: The Force Awakens (original title Star Wars: Episode VII – The Force Awakens)
- Best Animation/Family: The Jungle Book
- Best Animation/Family Poster: The Secret Life of Pets
- Best Animation/Family TV Spot: The Jungle Book
- Best Billboard: Allegiant
- Best Cinematic Vine/Instagram: Victor Frankestein
- Best Comedy: Keanu
- Best Comedy Poster: Dirty Grandpa
- Best Comedy TV Spot: Spy
- Best Documentary: He Named Me Malala
- Best Documentary Poster: Making a Murderer
- Best Documentary TV Spot: Making a Murderer
- Best Drama: The Martian
- Best Drama Poster: The Hateful Eight
- Best Drama TV Spot: Bridge of Spies (for "Standing Man International")
- Best Fantasy/Adventure Poster: The Hunger Games: Mockingjay – Part 2
- Best Fantasy/Adventure: Star Wars: The Force Awakens (original title Star Wars: Episode VII – The Force Awakens)
- Best Fantasy/Adventure TV Spot: The Hunger Games: Mockinjay – Part 2
- Best Foreign Action Trailer: Rise of the Legend (original title Huang feihong zhi yingxiong you meng)
- Best Foreign Animation/Family Trailer: Oddball and the Penguins (original title Oddball)
- Best Foreign Comedy Trailer: Rams (original title Hrutar)
- Best Foreign Documentary Trailer: Amy
- Best Foreign Drama Trailer: Phoenix
- Best Foreign Graphics in a Trailer: The Hallow
- Best Foreign Horror Trailer: Goodnight Mommy (original title Ich seh ich seh)
- Best Foreign Independent: Macbeth
- Best Foreign Music Trailer: Rattle the Cage (original title Zinzana)
- Best Foreign Poster: Downriver
- Best Foreign Romance Trailer: Brooklyn
- Best Foreign TV Spot: Crouching Tiger, Hidden Dragon: Sword of Destiny
- Best Foreign Teaser: High-Rise
- Best Foreign Thriller Trailer: The Wave (original title Bølgen)
- Best Graphics in a TV Spot: The Man from U.N.C.L.E.
- Best Horror: The Witch (original title The VVitch: A New-England Folktale)
- Best Horror Poster: Pride and Prejudice and Zombies
- Best Horror TV Spot: The Conjuring 2
- Best Independent: Spotlight
- Best Independent Poster: The End of the Tour
- Best Independent TV Spot: The Hateful Eight
- Best Independent Trailer (For a Film Budget Shot Under $1-Million U.S.): Grandma
- Best International Poster: Unfriended
- Best Motion Poster: Sinister 2
- Best Motion/Title Graphics: The Man from U.N.C.L.E.
- Best Music: Deadpool
- Best Music TV Spot: Straight Outta Compton
- Best Original Score: The Jungle Book
- Best Original Score TV Spot: The Jungle Book
- Best Radio/Audio Spot: Ride Along 2
- Best Romance: Me Before You
- Best Romance Poster: Me Before You
- Best Romance TV Spot: The Danish Girl
- Best Sound Editing: The Revenant
- Best Sound Editing in a TV Spot: The Witch (original title The VVitch: A New-England Folktale)
- Best Summer Blockbuster Poster: Suicide Squad
- Best Teaser: Joy
- Best Teaser Poster: Straight Outta Compton
- Best Teaser TV Spot: Jessica Jones
- Best Thriller: Black Mass
- Best Thriller Poster: The Martian
- Best Thriller TV Spot: Sicario
- Best Trailer/Teaser for a TV Series/Miniseries: Narcos
- Best Video Game Trailer: Assassin's Creed: Syndicate
- Best Viral Campaign: Paranormal Activity: The Ghost Dimension
- Best Voice Over TV Spot: Zoolander 2
- Best Wildposts: Minions
- Best of Show: Spotlight
- Foreign Trashiest Trailer: Loev
- Golden Fleece: Pixels
- Golden Fleece Foreign: J. Kessels
- Golden Fleece TV Spot: Fifty Shades of Black
- Most Innovating Advertising for a Feature Film: Mission: Impossible – Rogue Nation
- Most Original: Hail, Caesar! (for trailer #2)
- Most Original Foreign Trailer: Mission: Impossible – Rogue Nation
- Most Original Poster: Batman v Superman: Dawn of Justice
- Most Original TV Spot: Zootopia (for "Oscar Review" a.k.a. "Year in Film")
- Summer 2016 Blockbuster: Captain America: Civil War
- Summer 2016 Blockbuster TV Spot: Captain America: Civil War
- The Don LaFontaine Award for Best Voice Over: Anomalisa
- Trashiest Trailer: Blue Mountain State: The Rise of Thadland
- Best Trailer – No Movie: The Legend of Andor
- Trashiest Poster: Dirty Grandpa
- Best Graphics in a TV Spot: Dope

=== 2017 ===
18th Golden Trailer Award ceremony was held in 2017, the winners were:

- Best Action: Baby Driver
- Best Action TV Spot Trailer/Teaser: Narcos
- Best Action Poster: The Magnificent Seven
- Best Action TV Spot: John Wick: Chapter 2
- Best Animation/Family: The Lego Batman Movie
- Best Animation/Family TV Spot Trailer/Teaser: The Simpsons
- Best Animation/Family Poster: Pete's Dragon
- Best Animation/Family TV Spot: The Lego Batman Movie
- Best Billboard: Fantastic Beasts and Where to Find Them
- Best Comedy: The House
- Best Comedy TV Spot Trailer/Teaser: Last Week Tonight with John Oliver
- Best Comedy Poster: The Nice Guys
- Best Comedy TV Series Poster: The Simpsons
- Best Comedy TV Spot: Baywatch
- Best Documentary: Get Me Roger Stone
- Best Documentary TV Spot Trailer/Teaser: Get Me Roger Stone
- Best Documentary Poster: Lo and Behold, Reveries of the Connected World
- Best Documentary TV Spot: 13th
- Best Documentary/Reality TV Series Poster: American Crime Story
- Best Drama: Dunkirk
- Best Drama TV Spot Trailer/Teaser: Big Little Lies
- Best Drama Poster: Hacksaw Ridge
- Best Drama TV Spot: Arrival
- best Drama/Action TV Series Poster: Big Little Lies
- Best Fantasy/Adventure Poster: Star Wars: The Last Jedi (original title Star Wars: Episode VIII – The Last Jedi)
- Best Fantasy Adventure: Wonder Woman
- Best Fantasy/Adventure TV Spot Trailer/Teaser Series: Stranger Things
- Best Fantasy/Adventure TV Spot: Doctor Strange
- Best Foreign TV Spot Trailer/Teaser Series: The Silence Valley (original title Valea Muta)
- Best Foreign Action Trailer: Collide
- Best Foreign Animation/Family Trailer: Loving Vincent
- Best Foreign Comedy Trailer: David Brent: Life on the Road
- Best Foreign Documentary Trailer: I Am Bolt
- Best Foreign Drama: Lion
- Best Foreign Graphics in a Trailer: Loving Vincent
- Best Foreign Horror Trailer: Evolution (original title Evolution)
- Best Foreign Independent: Jawbone
- Best Foreign Music Trailer: Raw (original title Grave)
- Best Foreign Poster: The Man Who Was Thursday
- Best Foreign Romance Trailer: My Cousin Rachel
- Best Foreign TV Spot: Train to Busan (original title Busanhaeng)
- Best Foreign Teaser: Lady Macbeth
- Best Foreign Thriller Trailer: The Girl with All the Gifts
- Best Graphics TV Spot Trailer/Teaser Series: American Horror Story
- Best Graphics in a TV Spot: Moonlight
- Best Horror: It
- Best Horror Poster: Alien: Covenant
- Best Horror TV Poster: Don't Breathe
- Best Horror/Thriller TV Spot Trailer/Teaser Series: Westworld
- Best Horror/Thriller TV Series Poster: Fight of the Living Dead
- Best Independent: Manchester by the Sea
- Best Independent TV Spot Trailer/Teaser Series: I Don't Feel at Home in This World Anymore.
- Best Independent Poster: Moonlight
- Best Independent TV Spot: Moonlight
- Best Independent Trailer (For a Film Budget Shot Under $1-Million U.S.): Deep Water: The Real Story
- Best International Poster: Get Out
- Best Motion Poster: The Birth of a Nation
- Best Motion/Title Graphics: Atomic Blonde
- Best Music: Logan
- Best Music TV Spot Trailer/Teaser Series: Westworld
- Best Music TV Spot: La La Land
- Best Opening Title Sequence of Closing Credits for a Feature Film: xXx: Return of Xander Cage
- Best Opening Title Sequence or Closing Credits for a TV/Streaming Series: Big Little Lies
- Best Original Score: La La Land
- Best Original Score TV Spot Trailer/Teaser Series: Better Call Saul
- Best Original Score TV Spot: Rogue One: A Star Wars Story (original title Rogue One)
- Best Promo for a TV Network: Empowering Women Everywhere
- Best Radio/Audio Spot: The Lego Batman Movie
- Best Romance: The Light Between Oceans
- Best Romance Poster: La La Land
- Best Romance TV Spot: La La Land
- Best Sound Editing: Atomic Blonde
- Best Sound Editing TV Spot Trailer/Teaser Series: Legion
- Bet Sound Editing in a TV Spot: Sully
- Best Summer 2017 Blockbuster: Atomic Blonde
- Best Summer 2017 Blockbuster Poster: Wonder Woman
- Best Summer Blockbuster 2017: Guardians of the Galaxy Vol. 2
- Best Teaser: Blade Runner 2049
- Best Teaser Poster: Kong: Skull Island
- Best Teaser TV Spot: Sausage Party
- Best Thriller: A Cure for Wellness
- Best Thriller Poster: Split
- Best Thriller TV Spot: A Cure for Wellness
- Best Trailerbyte for a Feature Film: The Lego Batman Movie
- Best Trailerbyte for a TV Series/Streaming Series: Fargo
- Best Video Game Poster: Halo Wars 2
- Best Video Game TV Spot: Uncharted 4: A Thief's End
- Best Video Game Trailer: Call of Duty: Infinite Warfare
- Best Viral Campaign: Rings
- Best Viral or Campaign: Rings
- Best Voice Over TV Spot Trailer/Teaser Series: Designated Survivor
- Best Voice Over TV Spot: The Lego Batman Movie
- Best Wildposts: Doctor Strange
- Best of Show: Wonder Woman
- Foreign Trashiest Trailer: The Lure
- Golden Fleece: Resident Evil: The Final Chapter
- Golden Fleece Foreign: A Few Less Men
- Golden Fleece TV Spot: Assassin's Creed
- Most Innovating Advertising for a Feature Film: Arrival
- Most Original: The Nice Guys
- Most Original TV Spot Trailer/Teaser Series: American Horror Story
- Most Original Foreign Trailer: Evolution (original title Evolution)
- Most Original Poster: The Simpsons
- Most Original TV Spot: Sully
- Most Original Trailer: The Nice Guys
- The Don LaFontaine Award for Bet Voice Over: Amazon Studios, Magnolia Pictures, Mark Woollen & Associates
- Trashiest Trailer: Bad Santa 2
- Best Foreign TV Spot Trailer/Teaser Series: ?
- Best Foreign Drama Trailer: ?
- Best Summer 2017 Blockbuster TV Spot: ?
- Best Summer Blockbuster Poster: ?
- Don LaFontaine Award for Best Voice Over: ?
- Most Original TV Spot Trailer/Teaser Series: ?

=== 2018 ===
19th Golden Trailer Award ceremony was held in 2018, the winners were:

- Best Action: Black Panther
- Best Action TV Spot Trailer/Teaser Series: Narcos
- Best Action Poster: Wonder Woman: Crafting the Wonder
- Best Action TV Spot: Black Panther
- Best Animation/Family: Isle of Dogs
- Best Animation/Family TV Spot Trailer/Teaser Series: Bojack Horseman
- Best Animation/Family Poster: Peter Rabbit
- Best Billboard: Jumanji: Welcome to the Jungle
- Best Comedy: Lady Bird
- Best Comedy TV Spot Trailer/Teaser Series: Glow
- Best Comedy Poster: Baskets
- Best Comedy TV Spot: Ocean's Eight
- Best Documentary: Won't You Be My Neighbor?
- Best Documentary/Reality TV Spot Trailer/Teaser Series: One Strange Rock
- Best Documentary/Reality Poster TV Series: Adam Ruins Everything
- Best Documentary Poster: Studio 54
- Best Documentary TV Spot: I Am Not Your Negro
- Best Drama: The Shape of Water
- Best Drama TV Spot Trailer/Teaser Series: Westworld
- Best Drama Poster: Realive
- Best Drama TV Spot: Three Billboards Outside Ebbing, Missouri
- Best Drama/Action TV Series Poster: Ozark
- Best Fantasy/Adventure Poster: The Shape of Water
- Best Fantasy Adventure: Avengers: Endgame
- Best Fantasy/Adventure TV Spot Trailer/Teaser Series: Stranger Things
- Best Fantasy/Adventure TV Spot: Ready Player One
- Best Foreign TV Spot Trailer/Teaser Series: Dark
- Best Foreign Animation/ Family Trailer: Bilal
- Best Foreign Comedy Trailer: The Square
- Best Foreign Documentary Trailer: Devil's Freedom (original title La Libertad del Diablo)
- Best Foreign Drama Trailer: A Fantastic Woman (original title Una mujer fantastica)
- Best Foreign Horror Trailer: The Secret of Marrowbone (original title Marrowbone)
- Best Foreign Independent: BPM (Beats Per Minute) (original title 120 battements par minute)
- Best Foreign Music Trailer: Youth (original title Fang hua)
- Best Foreign Poster: The Silent Revolution (original title Das schweigende Klassenzimmer)
- Best Foreign TV Spot: The Square
- Best Foreign Teaser: Yardie
- Best Foreign Thriller Trailer: Double Lover (original title L'amant double)
- Best Graphics TV Spot Trailer/Teaser Series: Lady Dynamite
- Best Graphics in a TV Spot: The Spy Who Dumped Me
- Best Horror: A Quiet Place
- Best Horror Poster: Winchester
- Best Horror TV Spot: A Quiet Place
- Best Horror/Thriller TV Spot Trailer/Teaser Series: Rellik
- Best Horror/Thriller TV Series Poster: American Horror Story
- Best Independent: I, Tonya
- Best Independent Poster: Okja
- Best Independent TV Spot: Lady Bird
- Best Independent Trailer (For a Film Budget Shot Under $1-Million U.S.): The Endless
- Best International Poster: Wonder Woman: Crafting the Wonder
- Best Motion Poster: Isle of Dogs
- Best Motion/Title Graphics: Baby Driver
- Best Music: Baby Driver
- Best Music TV Spot Trailer/Teaser Series: Stranger Things
- Best Music TV Spot: Black Panther
- Best Original Score: Good Time
- Best Original Score TV Spot Trailer/Teaser Series: Westworld
- Best Original Score TV Spot: Phantom Thread
- Best Radio/Audio Spot: The Hitman's Bodyguard
- Best Romance: Call Me by Your Name
- Best Romance TV Spot: Phantom Thread
- Best Sound Editing: Mother!
- Best Sound Editing TV Spot Trailer/Teaser Series: Stranger Things
- Best Sound Editing in a TV Spot: Atomic Blonde
- Best Summer 2018 Blockbuster: Incredibles 2
- Best Summer Blockbuster TV Spot: Solo: A Star Wars Story
- Best Teaser: Deadpool 2
- Best Teaser Poster: Ocean's Eight
- Best Thriller: Unsane
- Best Thriller Poster: Flatliners
- Best Thriller TV Spot: Dunkirk
- Best Trailer for Book or Novel: The Butchering Art
- Best Trailerbyte for a Feature Film: Super Troopers 2
- Best Trailerbyte for a TV Series/Streaming Series: Westworld
- Best Video Game: Call of Duty: WWII
- Best Viral Campaign: The Disaster Artist
- Best Voice Over TV Spot Trailer/Teaser Series: Comrade Detective
- Best Voice Over TV Spot: Atomic Blonde
- Best Wildposts Teaser Campaign: Love, Simon
- Don LaFontaine Award for Best Voice Over: Mudbound
- Golden Fleece: The Meg
- Golden Fleece TV Spot: Resident Evil: The Final Chapter
- Most Innovating Advertising for TV Series/Streaming: The Long Road Home
- Most Innovating Advertising for a Feature Film: A Quiet Place
- Most Original TV Spot Trailer/Teaser Series: American Vandal
- Most Original Foreign Trailer: Jeannette: The Childhood of Joan or Arc (original title Jeannette, I'enfance de Jeanne d'Arc) tied with The Square
- Most Original Poster: The Vietnam War
- Most Original TV Spot: I, Tonya
- Most Original Trailer: Deadpool 2
- Trashiest Trailer: The Little Hours
- Best Animation/Family TV Spot: ?
- Best Foreign Action Trailer: Beyond the Edge (original title ISRA 88)
- Best Foreign Romance Trailer: ?
- Best Opening Title Sequence or Closing Credits for a Feature Film: ?

=== 2019 ===
20th Golden Trailer Award ceremony was held in 2019, the winners were:

- Best of Show: John Wick: Chapter 3 – Parabellum
- Box Office Weekend: Avengers: Endgame
- Best Action: John Wick: Chapter 3 – Parabellum
- Best Animation/Family: Toy Story 4
- Best Comedy: Long Shot
- Best Documentary: Free Solo
- Best Drama: A Star Is Born
- Best Horror: Us
- Best Independent Trailer: The Favourite
- Best Music: Us
- Best Thriller: Bird Box
- Best Video Game Trailer: Anthem
- Golden Fleece: Serenity
- Most Original Trailer: Roma
- Best Summer 2019 Blockbuster Trailer: John Wick: Chapter 3 – Parabellum
- Best Fantasy Adventure: Avengers: Endgame
- Best Teaser: Once Upon a Time in Hollywood
- Best Romance: A Star Is Born
- Don LaFontaine Award for Best Voice Over: If Beale Street Could Talk
- Trashiest Trailer: Piercing
- Best Motion/Title Graphics: The Irishman
- Best Sound Editing: Bohemian Rhapsody
- Best Original Score: Midsommar
- Best Independent Trailer (for film budget shot under $1.5Million US): Jonathan
- Best Faith-Based Trailer: Holy Lands
- Best Home Entertainment Action: Mission: Impossible – Fallout
- Best Home Entertainment Comedy: Crazy Rich Asians
- Best Home Entertainment Drama: Bohemian Rhapsody
- Best Home Entertainment Family/Animation: Mary Poppins Returns
- Best Home Entertainment Fantasy Adventure: Avengers: Infinity War
- Best Home Entertainment Horror/Thriller: In Darkness
- Best Foreign Action Trailer: Girls of the Sun (original title Les filles du soleil)
- Best Foreign Comedy Trailer: Sink or Swim (original title Le Grand Bain)
- Best Foreign Documentary Trailer: Sharkwater Extinction
- Best Foreign Drama Trailer: Border (original title Gräns)
- Best Foreign Horror Trailer: The Hole in the Ground
- Most Original Foreign Trailer: Temporary Difficulties (original title Vremennye trudnosti)
- Best Foreign Independent Trailer: Aniara
- Best Foreign Music Trailer: Beats
- Best Foreign Thriller Trailer: The Guilty (original title Den skyldige)
- Best Foreign Teaser: Shadow (original title 影)
- Best Action TV Spot (for a Feature Film): Jurassic World: Fallen Kingdom
- Best Animation/Family TV Spot (for a Feature Film): Mary Poppins Returns
- Best Comedy TV Spot (for a Feature Film): Deadpool 2
- Best Drama TV Spot (for a Feature Film): A Star Is Born
- Best Foreign TV Spot (for a Feature Film): Equally Powerful Movies
- Best Graphics in a TV Spot (for a Feature Film): Searching
- Best Horror TV Spot (for a Feature Film): Us
- Best Music TV Spot (for a Feature Film): A Star Is Born
- Best Romance TV Spot (for a Feature Film): Life Itself
- Best Thriller TV Spot (for a Feature Film): Us
- Best Video Game TV Spot (for a Feature Film): Fallout 76
- Best Voice Over TV Spot (for a Feature Film): The Favourite
- Most Original TV Spot (for a Feature Film): Deadpool 2
- Best Documentary TV Spot (for a Feature Film): Free Solo
- Best Fantasy Adventure TV Spot (for a Feature Film): Avengers: Endgame
- Best Original Score TV Spot (for a Feature Film): Native Son
- Best Sound Editing in a TV Spot (for a Feature Film): Hereditary
- Golden Fleece TV Spot (for a Feature Film): Hellboy
- Best Action TV Spot/Trailer/Teaser for a Series: The Boys
- Best Animation/Family TV Spot/Trailer/Teaser for a Series: Anne with an E
- Best Comedy TV Spot/Trailer/Teaser for a Series: Atlanta
- Best Drama TV Spot/Trailer/Teaser for a Series: Escape at Dannemora
- Best Documentary/Reality TV Spot/Trailer/Teaser for a Series: The Staircase
- Best Fantasy Adventure TV Spot/Trailer/Teaser for a Series: Game of Thrones
- Best Foreign TV Spot/Trailer/Teaser for a Series: Arde Madrid
- Best Graphics in a TV Spot/Trailer/Teaser for a Series: Biography
- Best Horror/Thriller TV Spot/Trailer/Teaser for a Series: Chernobyl
- Best Music TV Spot/Trailer/Teaser for a Series: Stranger Things
- Best Original Score TV Spot/Trailer/Teaser for a Series: The Twilight Zone
- Best Sound Editing TV Spot/Trailer/Teaser for a Series: Stranger Things
- Best Voice Over in a TV Spot/Trailer/Teaser for a Series: The Handmaid's Tale
- Most Original TV Spot/Trailer/Teaser for a Series: Maniac
- Best Promo for a TV Network: HBO
- Best Title/Credit Sequence for a Feature Length Film (or Video Game): Escape Room
- Best Title/Credit Sequence for a TV/Streaming Series: Chilling Adventures of Sabrina
- Best Promo for an OTO or Special: HBO
- Best Action Poster: John Wick: Chapter 3 – Parabellum
- Best Animation/Family Movie Poster: A Dog's Way Home
- Best Billboard: Roma
- Best Comedy Poster: The Hustle
- Best Documentary Poster: Free Solo
- Best Drama Poster: Roma
- Best Fantasy Adventure Poster: Captain Marvel
- Best Foreign Poster: Firecrackers
- Best Horror Poster: The Nun
- Best Independent Poster: Private Life
- Best International Poster: Bohemian Rhapsody
- Best Motion Poster: Mary Poppins Returns
- Best Summer 2019 Blockbuster Poster: The Lion King
- Best Teaser Poster: John Wick: Chapter 3 – Parabellum
- Best Thriller Poster: Glass
- Best Video Game Poster: Prey: Mooncrash
- Best Wildposts: Roma
- Most Original Poster: I Think We're Alone Now
- Best Animation/Family Poster for a TV/Streaming Series: Castlevania
- Best Comedy Poster for a TV/Streaming Series: Young Sheldon
- Best Documentary/Reality Poster for a TV/Streaming Series: The Inventor: Out for Blood in Silicon Valley
- Best Drama/Action Poster for a TV/Streaming Series: Black Mirror: Bandersnatch
- Best Horror/Thriller Poster for a TV/Streaming Series: Ghoul
- Best WildPosts for a TV/Streaming Series: Ozark
- Most Innovative Advertising for a Feature Film: Us
- Most Innovative Advertising for a TV/Streaming Series: Shark Week
- Best Viral Campaign: Hulu
- Best TrailerByte for a Feature Length Film: Mid90s
- Best TrailerByte for a TV/Streaming Series: Parker Strong: How the New England Patriots Became Super Heroes
- Best Radio/Audio Spot (All Genres): A Star Is Born

== 2020s ==
=== 2021 ===
The 21st Annual Awards ceremony was live-streamed from the Niswonger Performing Arts Center (NPAC) in Greeneville, Tennessee.

- Best of Show: A Quiet Place: Part II
- Box Office Weekend: Avengers: Endgame
- Best Action: 1917
- Best Animation/Family: Soul
- Best Comedy: Palm Springs
- Best Documentary: The Painter and the Thief
- Best Drama: Queen & Slim
- Best Horror: A Quiet Place: Part II
- Best Independent Trailer: Uncut Gems
- Best Music: Ma Rainey's Black Bottom
- Best Thriller: Joker
- Best Video Game Trailer: Assassin's Creed Valhalla
- Golden Fleece: Capone
- Most Original Trailer: Cherry
- Best Summer 2021 Blockbuster Trailer: F9
- Best Fantasy Adventure: Black Widow
- Best Teaser: Jojo Rabbit
- Best Romance: The Map of Tiny Perfect Things
- Best Trailer No Movie: The Lost Blonde: The Veronica Lake Story
- Don LaFontaine Award for Best Voice Over: Marriage Story
- Trashiest Trailer: White Trash Ninja: Ninja Badass
- Best Motion/Title Graphics: Judy & Punch
- Best Sound Editing: 1917
- Best Original Score: Star Wars: The Rise of Skywalker
- Best Independent Trailer (for film budget shot under $1.5Million US): Never Rarely Sometimes Always
- Best Faith-Based Trailer: I Still Believe
- Best Home Entertainment Action: Captain Marvel
- Best Home Entertainment Comedy: Freaky
- Best Home Entertainment Drama: The Cotton Club Encore
- Best Home Entertainment Family/Animation: Call of the Wild
- Best Home Entertainment Fantasy Adventure: Star Wars: The Rise of Skywalker
- Best Home Entertainment Horror/Thriller: Fear of Rain
- Best Foreign Action Trailer: Major Grom: Plague Doctor
- Best Foreign Comedy Trailer: Blinded by the Light
- Best Foreign Documentary Trailer: The Painter and the Thief
- Best Foreign Drama Trailer: The Life Ahead
- Best Foreign Horror Trailer: Saint Maud
- Most Original Foreign Trailer: Deerskin
- Best Foreign Independent Trailer: Parasite
- Best Foreign Music Trailer: Blinded by the Light
- Best Foreign Thriller Trailer: Official Secrets
- Best Foreign Teaser: Redemption Of A Rogue
- Best Action TV Spot (for a Feature Film): Top Gun: Maverick
- Best Animation/Family TV Spot (for a Feature Film): Frozen II
- Best Comedy TV Spot (for a Feature Film): 6 Underground
- Best Drama TV Spot (for a Feature Film): Cherry
- Best Foreign TV Spot (for a Feature Film): The Right Kind of Movies
- Best Graphics in a TV Spot (for a Feature Film): Jojo Rabbit
- Best Horror TV Spot (for a Feature Film): It Chapter Two
- Best Independent TV Spot (for a Feature Film): The Outpost
- Best Music TV Spot (for a Feature Film): Uncut Gems
- Best Romance TV Spot (for a Feature Film): Emma
- Best Summer Blockbuster TV Spot (for a Feature Film): Black Widow
- Best Thriller TV Spot (for a Feature Film): A Quiet Place: Part II
- Best Video Game TV Spot (for a Feature Film): Call of Duty: Modern Warfare
- Best Voice Over TV Spot (for a Feature Film): Emma
- Most Original TV Spot (for a Feature Film): Jojo Rabbit
- Best Documentary TV Spot (for a Feature Film): The Social Dilemma
- Best Fantasy Adventure TV Spot (for a Feature Film): Star Wars: The Rise of Skywalker
- Best Original Score TV Spot (for a Feature Film): Downton Abbey
- Best Sound Editing in a TV Spot (for a Feature Film): Greyhound
- Golden Fleece TV Spot (for a Feature Film): Cats
- Best Action TV Spot/Trailer/Teaser for a Series: Narcos
- Best Animation/Family TV Spot/Trailer/Teaser for a Series: Home Before Dark
- Best Comedy TV Spot/Trailer/Teaser for a Series: Motherland
- Best Drama TV Spot/Trailer/Teaser for a Series: The Queen's Gambit
- Best Documentary/Reality TV Spot/Trailer/Teaser for a Series: A Perfect Planet 60′ Trail
- Best Fantasy Adventure TV Spot/Trailer/Teaser for a Series: The Nevers
- Best Foreign TV Spot/Trailer/Teaser for a Series: Our Boys
- Best Graphics in a TV Spot/Trailer/Teaser for a Series: Sky Rojo
- Best Horror/Thriller TV Spot/Trailer/Teaser for a Series: The Purge
- Best Music TV Spot/Trailer/Teaser for a Series: The Crown
- Best Original Score TV Spot/Trailer/Teaser for a Series: The Underground Railroad
- Best Sound Editing TV Spot/Trailer/Teaser for a Series: FX on Hulu, "The Future", FX Networks.
- Best Voice Over in a TV Spot/Trailer/Teaser for a Series: Dave Chappelle Sticks & Stones "TV Spot", Netflix, Netflix In-House.
- Most Original TV Spot/Trailer/Teaser for a Series: WandaVision
- Best Promo for an OTO or Special: FX on Hulu, "The Ride", FX Networks, Buddha Jones.
- Best Promo for a TV Network: FX on Hulu, "The Future", FX Networks, Buddha Jones.
- Best Title/Credit Sequence for a Feature Length Film (or Video Game): Shazam!
- Best Title/Credit Sequence for a TV/Streaming Series: The Most Dangerous Animal of All
- Best Action Poster: 1917
- Best Animation/Family Movie Poster: Wolfwalkers
- Best Billboard: Blumhouse Glow In The Dark Billboard, Prime Video, LA
- Best Comedy Poster: Jojo Rabbit
- Best Documentary Poster: The Painter and the Thief
- Best Drama Poster: The Little Things
- Best Fantasy Adventure Poster: Star Wars: The Rise of Skywalker
- Best Foreign Poster: The Unlit
- Best Horror Poster: It Chapter Two
- Best Independent Poster: Synchronic
- Best International Poster: 1917
- Best Motion Poster: Soul
- Best Summer 2019 Blockbuster Poster: The Lion King
- Best Teaser Poster: John Wick: Chapter 3 – Parabellum
- Best Thriller Poster: Vivarium
- Best Video Game Poster: Mortal Kombat 11
- Best Wildposts: Zack Snyder's Justice League Character Art, HBO Max, Gravillis
- Most Original Poster: Borat Subsequent Moviefilm
- Best Animation/Family Poster for a TV/Streaming Series: Here We Art Key Art
- Best Comedy Poster for a TV/Streaming Series: Dave
- Best Documentary/Reality Poster for a TV/Streaming Series: Night Stalker: The Hunt for a Serial Killer
- Best Drama/Action Poster for a TV/Streaming Series: Brave New World
- Best Horror/Thriller Poster for a TV/Streaming Series: American Horror Story: 1984
- Best WildPosts for a TV/Streaming Series: Ted Lasso
- Most Innovative Advertising for a Feature Film: Godzilla: King of the Monsters
- Best Viral Campaign for a Feature Film: Jojo Rabbit
- Best Action/Thriller TrailerByte for a Feature Film: 1917
- Best Animation TrailerByte for a Feature Film: Soul
- Best Comedy / Drama TrailerByte for a Feature Film: Jojo Rabbit
- Best Horror / Thriller TrailerByte for a Feature Film: Come True
- Most Innovative Advertising for a TV/Streaming Series: For Life
- Best Viral Campaign for a TV / Streaming Series: Narcos
- Best Action / Thriller TrailerByte for a TV / Streaming Series: The Boys
- Best Animation TrailerByte for a TV / Streaming Series: Kipo & The Age Of Wonderbeasts
- Best Comedy / Drama TrailerByte for a TV / Streaming Series: Why Women Kill
- Best Horror / Thriller TrailerByte for a TV / Streaming Series: Chernobyl
- Best BTS/EPK for a Feature Film (Under 2 minutes): Ready or Not
- Best BTS/EPK for a Feature Film (Over 2 minutes): Star Wars: The Rise of Skywalker
- Best BTS/EPK for a TV/Streaming Series (Under 2 minutes): On the Rocks
- Best BTS/EPK for a TV/Streaming Series (Over 2 minutes): See
- Best Radio/Audio Spot (All Genres): Midnight Sky

=== 2022 ===
The 22nd Golden Trailer Awards were presented on October 6, 2022. The nominations were announced on August 2, 2022.

Show

Best in Show
Top Gun: Maverick, "Back"‡
Best Action	Best Animation/Family
Top Gun: Maverick, "Back"‡; The Batman; Bullet Train; The Matrix Resurrections, "Free"; Red Notice, "Teamwork"	Marcel the Shell with Shoes On, "Remember"‡; DC League of Super-Pets, "Krypto Hero"; Minions: The Rise of Gru, "Ready"; Sing 2, "Still Haven't Found"; The Sea Beast, "Maps"
Best Comedy	Best Documentary
The Unbearable Weight of Massive Talent, "Cage Cutdown"‡; Dog, "On the Road"; Don't Look Up, "Trajectory"; Father of the Bride, "Biggest Event"; The Lost City, "Real Adventure"	The Rescue‡; Becoming Cousteau; Chernobyl: The Lost Tapes; The Beatles: Get Back; The Mystery of Marilyn Monroe: The Unheard Tapes
Best Drama	Best Fantasy/Adventure
King Richard, "Greatness"‡; A Journal for Jordan; Belfast, "Everlasting"; House of Gucci, "Legacy"; The Many Saints of Newark	The Adam Project, "Future"‡; Avatar: The Way of Water, "The Beginning"; Doctor Strange in the Multiverse of Madness, "Nightmare"; Shang-Chi and the Legend of the Ten Rings, "Birthright"; Uncharted, "Fifty Fifty"
Best Foreign Trailer	Best Horror
Petite Maman, "Magical"‡; A Thousand Lines; Drive My Car; The Pilot. A Battle for Survival	Nope‡; A Banquet, "Special"; The Black Phone; Broadcast Signal Intrusion, "Override"; Men, "Haunted"
Best Independent Trailer	Best Music
Pig, "Whistle"‡; 7 Days; How It Ends, "Red Band"; Minamata, "Resistance"; The Phantom of the Open	CODA, "Something"‡; House of Gucci, "Legacy"; Last Night in Soho, "Downtown"; Respect, "Queen"; Spencer, "Perfect Day"
Best Thriller	Best Video Game Trailer
The Guilty, "Listen"‡; Last Night in Soho, "Downtown"; My Son, "Decision"; Voyagers, "Mayhem"; Watcher, "Alone"	The Outer Worlds 2‡; Elden Ring, "Ming Na Wen"; New World, "Blunderbuss"; Signalis, "A Dream About Dreaming"; WWE 2K22
Golden Fleece	Most Original Trailer
The Matrix Resurrections‡; Blacklight, "Good Guy"; Moonfall, "Not True"; Moonfall, "Not What We Think"; Snake Eyes, "Brave"	Everything Everywhere All at Once, "Fight"‡; Bullet Train; The Green Knight, "Proven"
Best Summer Blockbuster Trailer	Best Teaser
Top Gun: Maverick, "Back"‡; Doctor Strange in the Multiverse of Madness, "Nightmare"; Jurassic World Dominion, "Conclusion"; Lightyear, "Mission"; Minions: The Rise of Gru, "Ready"	The Tragedy of Macbeth, "Something Wicked"‡; Being the Ricardos, "Together"; The Flash, "Time"; The Northman, "Event"
Best Drama for a TV/Streaming Series (Trailer/Teaser/TV Spot)	Best Comedy for a TV/Streaming Series (Trailer/Teaser/TV Spot)
House of the Dragon, "Tear Down"‡; Dopesick; The Last Days of Ptolemy Grey, "Memories"; The Terminal List, "Mission"; Women of the Movement, "Powerful"	The Great, "War"‡; Cobra Kai: Season 4; Hacks, "Desperate"; Julia, "Bon Appetit"; The Great: Season 2, "Blessed"

Non-Show (Theatrical)

The Don LaFontaine Award for Best Voice Over	Best Motion/Title Graphics
Nightmare Alley, "Beast"‡; C'mon C'mon, "Teaser"; F9, "Dom's Story"; The Green Knight, "Proven"; Muppets Haunted Mansion, "Fright"	The Last Duel, "Cost Rev"‡; The Green Knight, "Proven"; Jimmy Savile: A British Horror Story, "Evil"; Respect, "Queen"; Summer of Soul
Best Sound Editing	Best Original Score
Three Thousand Years of Longing, "Three Wishes"‡; Army of Thieves, "Chance"; Dune, "Odeon International Trailer"; The Northman, "Boy"	Dune, "Time"‡; Avatar: The Way of Water, "The Beginning"; Marvel Studios Celebrates the Movies "Reunion"; Rocky IV: Rocky vs. Drago "The Ultimate Director's Cut – The Journey"; Spider-Man: No Way Home, "Choose"
Best Independent Trailer (for Film Budget Shot Under $1.5 Million)	Best Romance
Violet, "Free"‡; Boiling Point; Clara Sola; Family Squares; Into the Lost Desert, "Explorer"	Eiffel‡; Cha Cha Real Smooth, "Soulmates"; Marry Me, "Kat"; Sounds Like Love, "Maca"; Together
Best Faith Based Trailer	Best Trailer No Movie
American Underdog, "Believe"‡; Bipolar; The Eyes of Tammy Faye	On the Clock‡; Don't Tell Mum; King of Fortune; Operation Blackout; Sundance 40th Celebration, "Tribute Reel"
Trashiest Trailer
Till Death‡; Let the Wrong One In; The Seed; V/H/S/94; X, "Classy"

Streaming

Best Action for a TV/Streaming Series (Trailer/Teaser/TV Spot)	Best Animated for a TV/Streaming Series (Trailer/Teaser/TV Spot)
Obi-Wan Kenobi, "Patience"‡; 100 Foot Wave; Lupin, "Most Wanted"; Peacemaker, "New Purpose"; Vikings: Valhalla, "Rebirth"	Dug Days, "Digged"‡; Baymax!, "Save"; Disney Launchpad, "Discover"; Fraggle Rock: Back to the Rock, "Party"; Star Wars: Visions, "Warrior"
Best Documentary/Reality for a TV/Streaming Series (Trailer/Teaser/TV Spot)	Best Fantasy/Adventure for a TV/Streaming Series (Trailer/Teaser/TV Spot)
The Green Planet‡; 9/11: One Day in America; Lucy and Desi; Muhammad Ali, "GOAT"; Trafficked with Mariana van Zeller	Loki, "Glorious Purpose"‡; Solos, "Together"; The Wheel of Time; The Wheel of Time, "Rise"; The Witcher, "Monster"
Best Foreign TV Spot/Trailer/Teaser for a TV/Streaming Series	Best Graphics for a TV/Streaming Series (Trailer/Teaser/TV Spot)
Landscapers‡; Clark; Dr. Brain, "Memories"; Lupin, "Most Wanted"; Pachinko, "Home"; The Serpent	Winning Time: The Rise of the Lakers Dynasty, "Showtime"‡; Bigbug; Phat Tuesdays: The Era Of Hip Hop Comedy, "Culture"; Russian Doll Season 2; Solos, "Together"
Best Horror/Thriller for a TV/Streaming Series (Trailer/Teaser/TV Spot)	Best Music for a TV/Streaming Series (Trailer/Teaser/TV Spot)
Midnight Mass, "Miracles"‡; The Girl Before; Lisey's Story, "Hunt"; The Tourist; The Woman in the House Across the Street from the Girl in the Window, "Crazy"	Wu-Tang: An American Saga, "Brother"‡; America the Beautiful; The Marvelous Mrs. Maisel Season 4, "Voice"; Pachinko, "Home"; Pistol, "Revolution"
Best Original Score for a TV/Streaming Series (Trailer/Teaser/TV Spot)	Best Sound Editing for a TV/Streaming Series (Trailer/Teaser/TV Spot)
WeCrashed, "WeDream"‡; Severance; Star Trek: Picard Season 2, "The Trial Never Ends"; Succession, "Battle Night"; The Witcher Season 2	Watch the Sound with Mark Ronson, "Listen"‡; Halston, "Vision"; See Season 2, "A Good Man"; Stranger Things Season 4, "War"; Vikings: Valhalla, "Rebirth"
Best Voice Over for a TV/Streaming Series (Trailer/Teaser/TV Spot)	Most Original Trailer/Teaser/TV Spot for a Series
Winning Time: The Rise of the Lakers Dynasty, "Chick"‡; Chillin Island, "Nature Is"; Not So Pretty; Ozark Season 4, "Reverse"; The Witcher, "A Beginner's Guide"	Euphoria, "Unpredictable"‡; 1883, "Motion Tintype"; Physical Season 1, "Icon"; Severance, "Secrets"; The Woman in the House Across the Street from the Girl in the Window, "Hallucinations"
Best Promo for an OTO Special	Best Promo for a TV Network
94th Academy Awards, "Roll Camera"‡; Friends: The Reunion; Harry Potter 20th Anniversary: Return to Hogwarts, "Family"; PBS Short Film Festival 2021; Rock and Roll Hall of Fame Induction Ceremony	HBO: Women's History Month, "Rule Breakers"‡; Apple TV+, "Holiday Multi-Show"; FX on Hulu, "Revolutionary"; HBO: October 2021, "Image CE"; Netflix Year in Preview 2022, "Movie Night"

TV Spots (Theatrical)

Best Action TV Spot (for a Feature Film)	Best Animated/Family TV Spot (for a Feature Film)
No Time to Die, "Weapon"‡; Dune, "Protect"; The Matrix Resurrections, "Returns"; Uncharted, "Lock"	Cruella, "Problem"‡ (Winner: Create Advertising Group); CODA, "Duet"; Luca, "Silencio"; Minions: The Rise of Gru, "Mini Boss"; Sing 2, "Gunter's Idea"
Best Comedy TV Spot (for a Feature Film)	Best Documentary TV Spot (for a Feature Film)
The Unbearable Weight of Massive Talent, "Character Drama"‡; Don't Look Up, "Mobilize"; Hitman's Wife's Bodyguard, "Summer Sabbatical"; The Lost City, "Throwdown"; The Lost City, "Treasure"	Kid 90‡; The Alpinist, "Dangerous"; The Donut King; Roadrunner: A Film About Anthony Bourdain, "Searching"; Summer of Soul, "Take My Hand"
Best Drama TV Spot (for a Feature Film)	Best Fantasy/Adventure TV Spot (for a Feature Film)
CODA, "Family"‡; Belfast, "Discover"; The Many Saints of Newark, "Simple"; The Northman, "Remember"; Respect, "Rise"	Uncharted, "Betray"‡ (Winner: Create Advertising Group); The Adam Project, "Something Cool"; Dune, "Frightened"; Fantastic Beasts: The Secrets of Dumbledore, "Ready"; Shang-Chi and the Legend of the Ten Rings
Best Foreign TV Spot (for a Feature Film)	Best Graphics in a TV Spot (for a Feature Film)
Seamless Movies‡; The Colour Room; Fire on the Plain; Raging Fire	Bo Burnham: Inside, "Accomplishment"; The Northman, "Vision Review"; The Sky Is Everywhere, "Fall"; Summer of Soul
Best Horror TV Spot (for a Feature Film)	Best Independent TV Spot
Nope, "Stampede"‡; A Quiet Place Part II, "Signal/Car"; Candyman, "Swarm"; Resident Evil: Welcome to Raccoon City, "Evil"; Resident Evil: Welcome to Raccoon City, "This Town"	Everything Everywhere All at Once, "Daughter"‡; Everything Everywhere All at Once, "Jumping"; How It Ends, "Critics Party"; How It Ends, "Figaro"; Minamata, "Puppet Show"
Best Music TV Spot (for a Feature Film)	Best Original Score in a TV Spot (for a Feature Film)
How It Ends, "Critics Party"‡; American Utopia, "FYC Emmy"; Masters of the Beat; Minamata, "Puppet Show"; Summer of Soul, "Take My Hand"	Striving for Perfection‡; Downton Abbey: A New Era, "Delightful Review"; Downton Abbey: A New Era, "Enchanting"; Downton Abbey: A New Era, "Fan Reaction"; Harmonious Movies
Best Romance TV Spot (for a Feature Film)	Best Sound Editing in a TV Spot (for a Feature Film)
Cyrano, "Secret"‡; Free Guy, "The Kiss"; Fresh, "Freak Out"; Marry Me, "Choice"; West Side Story, "Legendary"	The Woman in the Window, "Agoraphobia"‡; The Power of the Dog, "Whistle"; SEAMLESS MOVIES; The Tomorrow War, "Team Up"; Uncharted, "Lock"
Best Summer Blockbuster TV Spot (for a Feature Film)	Best Thriller TV Spot (for a Feature Film)
Jurassic World Dominion, "Matters"‡	Deep Water, "Breathless"‡; Encounter, "Family"; Operation Mincemeat, "Trick"
Best Video Game TV Spot	Best Voice Over TV Spot (for a Feature Film)
Marvel's Guardians of the Galaxy; The Walking Dead: Survivors	Nightmare Alley, "Beast"‡; Belfast, "Discover"; CODA, "Groundbreaking Review"; Free Guy, "It's Been a While"; Hitman's Wife's Bodyguard, "Cursed"
Golden Fleece TV Spot (for a Feature Film)	Most Original TV Spot (for a Feature Film)
Dear Evan Hansen, "Sincerely, Me"‡; Marry Me, "RPDR"; The Prey: Legend of Karnoctus	The Matrix Resurrections, "Déjà Vu"‡; Bo Burnham: Inside, "Accomplishment"; The French Dispatch, "Tune In"; Hitman's Wife's Bodyguard, "Cursed"; The Northman, "Vision Review"

=== 2023 ===
The 23rd Golden Trailer Awards were presented in Los Angeles on June 29, 2023. The nominations were announced on June 5, 2023.

Show

Best Action	Best Animation/Family
John Wick: Chapter 4: "Legend"; Fast X: "Legacy Ride"; SISU; Guy Ritchie's The Covenant: "Remember"; The Woman King: "Power"	Spider-Man: Across the Spider-Verse; Minions: The Rise of Gru: "New Adventure"; Pinocchio: "Wonder"; Polite Society; The Boy, the Mole, the Fox and the Horse: "Together"
Best Comedy	Best Documentary – Subject
Cocaine Bear: "Higher"; The Banshees of Inisherin; Air: "Flight"; Champions: "Brave"; Thor: Love and Thunder	Retrograde: "Aftermath Teaser"; If These Walls Could Sing: "Sacred"; My Old School; "Sr."; Wildcat: "Redemption"
Best Documentary – Bio Pic of an Individual	Best Drama
Still: A Michael J. Fox Movie; All the Beauty and the Bloodshed; Louis Armstrong's Black and Blues; Moonage Daydream: "Mystery"; Sidney: "The First"	Oppenheimer: "Secrets"; The Whale: "People"; Till: "A Mother Knows"; War Sailor; Women Talking: "VOTE"
Best Fantasy Adventure	Best Horror
Indiana Jones and the Dial of Destiny: "New Day"; Dune: Part Two; Dungeons & Dragons: Honor Among Thieves: "Ironic"; Guardians of the Galaxy Vol. 3: "Encore"; Thor: Love and Thunder	Smile: "Frighten"; Barbarian: "Tenant"; Evil Dead Rise; M3GAN: "Family"; Smile
Best Independent Trailer	Best Music
Women Talking: "Unknown"; Alice, Darling: "Beautiful Girl"; Nefarious: "Electrifying"; Squaring The Circle; The Whale: "People"	Babylon; Avatar: The Way of Water: "Strong Heart"; Fast X: "Legacy Ride Trailer"; Whitney Houston: I Wanna Dance with Somebody: "Princess"; Tetris
Best Thriller	Best Video Game Trailer
Don't Worry Darling: "Chaos"; Nope: "Moment"; Oppenheimer: "Lightmaker"; The Good Nurse: "Truth"; The Menu: "Welcome"	Hogwarts Legacy: "Official Launch Trailer" (winner: Create Advertising Group); Dune: Awakening: "Pre-Alpha Teaser"; Final Fantasy XVI: "Revenge Trailer"; God of War Ragnarök: "Story Trailer"; NBA 2K23 Jordan Challenge
Golden Fleece	Most Original Trailer
Smoking Causes Coughing; Mr. Malcolm's List: "Tea With Mrs Covington"; Shark Bait; Shazam! Fury of the Gods: "Official Trailer 2"; The Minute You Wake Up Dead: "Deception"	Tár: "Time"; Beau Is Afraid: "Beyond"; Glass Onion: A Knives Out Mystery: "Puzzle"; The Subtle Art of Not Giving a F*ck; White Noise
Best Summer 2023 Blockbuster Trailer	Best Foreign Trailer
Oppenheimer: "Secrets"; Fast X: "Last Ride"; Guardians of the Galaxy Vol. 3: "Encore"; Indiana Jones and the Dial of Destiny: "New Day"; Transformers: Rise of the Beasts: "Darkness"	RRR: "RRRe-Release"; Argentina, 1985: "Courage"; Bardo, False Chronicle of a Handful of Truths: "Journey"; Corsage: "Duty"; The Challenge
Best Drama for a TV/Streaming Series (Trailer/Teaser/TV Spot)	Best Comedy for a TV/Streaming Series (Trailer/Teaser/TV Spot)
Succession: "Battle Royale" (winner: Create Advertising Group); Daisy Jones & the Six: "Look at Us Now"; Das Boot (Season 3); Stranger Things (Season 4): "Hype Vol. 2"; The Crown (Season 5): "Breaking Point"	Ted Lasso (Season 3): "Fun"; Only Murders in the Building (Season 2): "Persons of Interest"; Poker Face: "Fresh Starts"; The Great; The Marvelous Mrs. Maisel (Season 5): "Midge"
Best Teaser
Barbie: "Teaser"; Blonde: "Official Teaser"; Guardians of the Galaxy Vol. 3: "Magic"; Indiana Jones and the Dial of Destiny: "New Day"; The Menu: "Welcome"

Non-Show (Theatrical)

The Don LaFontaine Award for Best Voice Over	Best Motion/Title Graphics
Glass Onion: A Knives Out Mystery: "Puzzle"; Bed Rest: "Relax"; Dune: Part Two; Spirited: "Def Not Lip Syncing"; Tár: "Time"	Glass Onion: A Knives Out Mystery: "Puzzle"; Black Panther: Wakanda Forever: "Leaders"; Missing: "Junebug"; The Greatest Beer Run Ever: "Serve"; The Trial
Best Sound Editing	Best Original Score
Oppenheimer: "Secrets"; Glass Onion: A Knives Out Mystery: "Puzzle"; John Wick: Chapter 4: "Peace Teaser"; The Stranger; The Woman King: "Power"	Glass Onion: A Knives Out Mystery: "Puzzle"; Blonde: "Official Teaser"; Lady Chatterley's Lover: "Life"; The Boy, the Mole, the Fox and the Horse: "Together"; The Little Mermaid: "Above"
Best Faith-Based Trailer	Best Romance
Ordinary Angels: "Family"; Big George Foreman: "Impossible"; Jesus Revolution; On a Wing and a Prayer: "Let Go"; The Unlikely Pilgrimage of Harold Fry	Past Lives: "Fate"; Meet Cute; My Policeman: "Memories"; Sanctuary: "Safeword"; She Is Love
Best Independent Trailer (for film budget shot under $1.5Million US)	Trashiest Trailer
Upon Entry; Double Down South; Surrounded: "Never Free"; The Arc of Oblivion; The Aviary	Holy Shit!; Sex with Sue: "Sue Johanson Doc Trailer"; The Black Demon; The Estate: "Official Red Band Trailer"; The Retaliators: "Christmas Trailer"

TV Spot (Theatrical)

Best Action TV Spot (for a Feature Film)	Best Animation / Family TV Spot (for a Feature Film)
Fast X: "Ahead"; Black Panther: Wakanda Forever: "New World Power"; Bullet Train: "Undertaking"; The Gray Man; Guy Ritchie's The Covenant: "Remember"	Guillermo del Toro's Pinocchio: "Dear Son"; Minions: The Rise of Gru: "New Adventure 60"; Puss in Boots: The Last Wish: "Tales of Old"; The Boy, the Mole, the Fox and the Horse: "Brave"; Thor: Love and Thunder
Best Comedy TV Spot (for a Feature Film)	Best Documentary TV Spot (for a Feature Film)
Air: "Future"; Champions; Glass Onion: A Knives Out Mystery: "Raise Your Glass"; Minions: The Rise of Gru: "One Shot"; You People: "Impression"	Retrograde; The Redeem Team: "Nuff Said"; The Redeem Team: "Prime Lineup"; The Territory; The Woman King
Best Drama TV Spot (for a Feature FIlm)	Best Fantasy Adventure TV Spot (for a Feature Film)
The Woman King: "Freedom"; Air: "Rookie"; Black Panther: Wakanda Forever: "Legacy Review"; Don't Worry Darling: "Window TV"; Oppenheimer: "Change"	Indiana Jones and the Dial of Destiny: "Hero"; Ant-Man and the Wasp: Quantumania; Avatar: The Way of Water: "Adapt"; Dungeons & Dragons: Honor Among Thieves: "Island 30 TV Spot"; Thor: Love and Thunder
Best Foreign TV Spot (for a Feature Film)	Best Graphics in a TV Spot (for a Feature Film)
MOVIESUMMER (TNT4); Friday Movies on Friday!; Movies on Globo; Ruido (Noise); Tarantino is Coming to Town	See How They Run: "Headline Act"; Amsterdam: "Mess Around"; Black Panther: Wakanda Forever: "Feel It"; Joker: Folie à Deux: "Date Announce"; Tarantino is Coming to Town
Best Horror TV Spot (for a Feature Film)	Best Independent TV Spot
Evil Dead Rise: "Click Review"; Evil Dead Rise: "You"; Evil Dead Rise: "Free"; Scream VI: "Cursed"; Smile: "Fears"	FEAR: "Big Movie 15"; A Thousand and One: "Performance"; Bones and All: "Thread"; The Whale: "Acclaim"
Best Music TV Spot (for a Feature Film)	Best Original Score TV Spot (for a Feature Film)
The Gray Man; Elton John Live: Farewell from Dodger Stadium: "Disney+ Live Stream Trailer"; Whitney Houston: I Wanna Dance with Somebody: "Remember"; Indiana Jones and the Dial of Destiny: "Hero"; Nope: "Choices"	Crimes of the Future: "Pain"; MOVIESUMMER (TNT4); Succession: "Nothing's the Same"; The Hateful Eight; The Territory
Best Romance TV Spot (for a Feature Film)	Best Sound Editing in a TV Spot (for a Feature Film)
Shotgun Wedding: "Untraditional"; Good Luck to You, Leo Grande: "Beautiful"; My Policeman: "Waves"; Pamela, a Love Story: "Romantic"; Tár: "Fame Murder"	Dungeons & Dragons: Honor Among Thieves: "Sound"; 65: "Visitor"; Fast X: "Clash"; Oppenheimer: "Change"; The Hateful Eight
Best Thriller TV Spot (for a Feature Film)	Best Voice-Over TV Spot (for a Feature Film)
Nope: "Choices"; Don't Worry Darling: "Leave"; FEAR: "It's Time"; Luther: The Fallen Sun; Oppenheimer: "Change"	Polite Society; Dungeons & Dragons: Honor Among Thieves: "Epic Quote"; The Woman King: "Legend"
Most Original TV Spot (for a Feature Film)
Champions; ESPN NBA Playoffs: Nope; Mission: Impossible: "Christmas Protocol"; Nope: "Choices"; Printer Movies, Friday!

Streaming

Best Action for a TV/Streaming Series (Trailer/Teaser/TV Spot)	Best Animation/Family for a TV/Streaming Series (Trailer/Teaser/TV Spot)
Andor: "Uprising"; Citadel: "Turn"; Jack Ryan (Season 3): "Run Jack Run"; See (Season 3): "Rise"; Vikings: Valhalla (Season 2): "Destiny"	Lost Ollie: "Dream"; Cars on the Road: "Road Trip"; Crater: "Road Trip"; Star Wars: Tales of the Jedi: "Destiny"; Star Wars: The Bad Batch (Season 2): "Choice Trailer"
Best Documentary/Reality for a TV/Streaming Series (Trailer/Teaser/TV Spot)	Best Fantasy Adventure for a TV/Streaming Series (Trailer/Teaser/TV Spot)
The Last Movie Stars: "Beautiful"; Edge of the Earth; Edge of the Unknown with Jimmy Chin: "Trailer"; Stolen Youth: Inside the Cult at Sarah Lawrence: "Truth Trailer"; Trafficked with Mariana van Zeller (Season 3)	Wednesday: "Nero"; House of the Dragon: "Heir"; The Lord of the Rings: The Rings of Power; Secret Invasion: "Threat"; The Mandalorian (Season 3): "The Way Cutdown"
Best Foreign TV Spot/Trailer/Teaser for a TV/Streaming Series	Best Graphics for a TV/Streaming Series (Trailer/Teaser/TV Spot)
The Nurse; Broad Peak: "Obsession"; Delhi Crime (Season 2); Jung_E: "Unleashed"; Trial by Fire	1899: "Triangles"; Foundation (Season 2): "Mission"; I Just Killed My Dad; Rabbit Hole; WB100: Celebrate Every Story
Best Horror/Thriller for a TV/Streaming Series (Trailer/Teaser/TV Spot)	Best Music for a TV/Streaming Series (Trailer/Teaser/TV Spot)
FROM (Season 2): "Dream"; Dahmer – Monster: The Jeffrey Dahmer Story: "Don't Go"; Rabbit Hole: "Paranoia"; The Watcher: "Obsession"; You (Season 4, Part 2)	Stranger Things (Season 4): "Hype Vol. 2"; Silo: "Ready"; Ted Lasso (Season 3): "Return"; The Last of Us: "Alone"; The Marvelous Mrs. Maisel (Season 5): "Icon"
Best Original Score for a TV/Streaming Series (Trailer/Teaser/TV Spot)	Best Sound Editing for a TV/Streaming Series (Trailer/Teaser/TV Spot)
The Mandalorian (Season 3): "Stronger"; A Small Light: "Light of Lights"; Andor: "Uprising"; His Dark Materials (Series 3); The Lord of the Rings: The Rings of Power	Only Murders in the Building (Season 2): "Click" (winner: Create Advertising Group); 1899: "Morse Code Teaser"; A Small Light: "Light of Lights"; House of the Dragon: "Heir"; Stranger Things (Season 4): "Hype Vol. 2"
Best Voice Over for a TV/Streaming Series (Trailer/Teaser/TV Spot)	Most Original TV Spot/Trailer/Teaser for a Series
Ramy (Season 3): "Family"; A League of Their Own: "Play Ball"; America the Beautiful; The Guardians of the Galaxy Holiday Special: "Guardians of Cheer"; Los Espookys (Season 2)	The Watcher: "House"; Luther: The Fallen Sun: "Cage"; Rabbit Hole: "Face Value"; Ted Lasso (Season 3): "Return"; The Great
Best Promo for an OTO Special	Best Promo for a TV Network
Presenting the 2023 Best Picture Nominees; Chris Rock: Selective Outrage: "Group Text"; CMA 2022: "Practice 60"; The 2023 Crunchyroll Anime Awards Event Promo; The Oscars Shoot Spot	Nat Geo Sizzle Brand Anthem: "Wonder"; HBO Max "Emmys Brand Campaign 2022"; Hulu 15th Anniversary: "The Cake"; Hulu Brand Pomo: "Hulu Has Movies"; Paramount+: Star Trek: "Every Series. Every Episode."

Digital & Innovation

Best Digital – Action	Best Digital – Animation / Family
Top Gun: Maverick: "Aviation Day"; Black Panther: Wakanda Forever: "Shuri Rising"; Dungeons & Dragons: Honor Among Thieves; Powerful; Training Day: "Spiral"	A Christmas Story: "Holiday Classic"; Lyle, Lyle, Crocodile; Minions: The Rise of Gru: "Brace Yourself/#1 Comedy"; Puss in Boots: The Last Wish: "Most Interesting Cat"; The Bob's Burgers Movie: "Hits"
Best Digital – Comedy	Best Digital – Drama
Spirited: "Def Not Lip Syncing"; A Christmas Story: "Holiday Classic"; Dungeons & Dragons: Honor Among Thieves; History of the World, Part II; Jackass Forever: "Stress Help"	Casablanca: "80th Anniversary"; Cool Hand Luke: 4K Trailer "Chains"; Tár: "Split"; The Americans: "Watching Us"; Tiny Beautiful Things
Best Digital – Fantasy Adventure	Best Digital – Horror / Thriller
Avatar: The Way of Water: "Journey"; Avatar: The Way of Water: "Great Strength"; Black Panther: Wakanda Forever; Doctor Strange in the Multiverse of Madness: "Open Says Me"; Thor: Love and Thunder: "Colour War"	M3GAN: "Getting Hacked"; M3GAN: "Bringing Life to M3GAN"; M3GAN: "Meet M3GAN"; Nope: "Breathe Review"; The Lost Boys: "35th Anniversary"
Most Innovative Advertising for a Feature Film	Best Action/Thriller TrailerByte for a Feature Film
Puss in Boots: The Last Wish: "Hot Ones"; ESPN NBA Finals: Bullet Train: "Off the Rails"; Spirited: "The Ryan Reynolds+"; The Super Mario Bros. Movie: "Giant Peach"; Tweets in Space	Avatar: The Way of Water: "Planet Pandora"; Avatar: The Way of Water: "Journey Through Pandora"; Fast X: "Ensamble Shoot"; Tetris: "Blocks 9×16"; The Gray Man: "Get the Gray Man"
Best Animation TrailerByte for a Feature Film	Best Comedy / Drama TrailerByte for a Feature Film
Turning Red: "Boots & Cats"; 9 Lives in 90 Seconds; Puss in Boots: The Last Wish: "Pandora's Box"	The Unlikely Pilgrimage of Harold Fry: "Book to Screen"; Amsterdam: "Home Movies"; Whitney Houston: I Wanna Dance with Somebody: "Cassette Tape"; Moonage Daydream: "Peculiar Window"; See How They Run: "Conclusions"
Best Horror / Thriller TrailerByte for a Feature Film	Best Viral Campaign for a Feature Film
Barbarian; Don't Worry Darling; Nope: "Look Away"; Smile: "Spin"; The Pope's Exorcist: "Fear Frame Breaker"	Cocaine Bear: "Digital Campaign"; Amsterdam: "Social Campaign"; Creed III: "Paid Social Campaign"; Glass Onion: A Knives Out Mystery; Spirited: "Viral Campaign"
Most Innovative Advertising for a TV/Streaming Series	Best Action / Thriller TrailerByte for a TV / Streaming Series
Evil Social Campaign; Abbott Elementary: "Traveling Teachers Lounge with Scholastic"; Hulu St. Patrick's Day: "Boat Stunt"; Only Murders in the Building (Season 2): "Times Square Sweepstakes"; Welcome to Chippendales Campaign	Stranger Things (Season 4): "Layers 1"; Andor: "Rebel with a Cause"; Jack Ryan (Season 3): "Red Notice"; The Mandalorian (Season 3): "Reunited"; Stranger Things (Season 4): "Layers 2"
Best Comedy / Drama TrailerByte for a TV / Streaming Series	Best Viral Campaign for a TV / Streaming Series
Only Murders in the Building (Season 2): "Evidence"; She-Hulk: Attorney at Law: "Split"; Star Trek: Strange New Worlds: "Windows to the Worlds Social Video"; The Boys (Season 3): "Destruction"; The Orville: New Horizons: "Don't Break the Feed"	Only Murders in the Building (Season 2): "Paid Social Campaign"; Abbott Elementary at SDCC 2022; She-Hulk: Attorney at Law Creative Content Campaign; Stranger Things (Season 4): "Paid Social Campaign"; Ziwe (Season 2B)
Best BTS/EPK for a Feature Film (Under 2 minutes)	Best BTS/EPK for a Feature Film (Over 2 minutes)
Corsage: "Corset"; Guillermo del Toro's Pinocchio: "Tudum"; Return to Pandora; Thor: Love and Thunder: "A Taika Waititi Adventure"; Top Gun: Maverick: "Aviation Day"	Everything Everywhere All At Once: "Scene at the Academy"; Avatar: The Way of Water: "Acting in the Volume"; EO: "Donkey"; Nope: "Shadows"; Women Talking: "A New Forward"
Best BTS/EPK for a TV/Streaming Series (Under 2 minutes)	Best BTS/EPK for a TV/Streaming Series (Over 2 minutes)
The Guardians of the Galaxy Holiday Special: "Guardians of Cheer"; Andor: "Character Pieces"; Gotham Knights; Guillermo del Toro's Cabinet of Curiosities: "First Look Visualizer"; The Dropout: "Inside"	A Small Light: "In Production"; A League of Their Own: "Batter Up"; Hello Tomorrow!: "Billy Crudup: Reflecting on His Dad"; Kaleidoscope: "Building Kaleidoscope"; The Lord of the Rings: The Rings of Power: "Behind the Scenes of Episode 8"

Poster

Best Action Poster	Best Animation / Family Movie Poster
Polite Society: "Payoff"; Black Adam: "Payoff"; Carnival Row (Season 2): "Key Art"; Dungeons & Dragons: Honor Among Thieves: "One Sheet"	Diary of a Wimpy Kid: Rodrick Rules: "Crowd"; Diary of a Wimpy Kid: Rodrick Rules; DC League of Super-Pets; Pinocchio: "One Sheet"
Best Billboard (for Feature Film or TV/Streaming Series)	Best Comedy Poster
Welcome to Chippendales: "3-D Digital Billboard"; Carnival Row (Season 2); Reservation Dogs (Season 2): "Extension Billboard"; The Lord of the Rings: The Rings of Power: "Statue Billboard"	Paint; History of the World, Part II; Renfield; Shrinking
Best Documentary Poster	Best Drama Poster
Aftershock; All That Breathes; Is That Black Enough for You?!?; Katrina Babies	Sharper: "Kaleidoscope"; Beau Is Afraid: "Payoff"; Corsage; Mrs. Harris Goes to Paris
Best Foreign Poster	Best Horror Poster
Kill Boksoon: "Date Announcement"; Living; Storm: "Paradox"; The Taste of Apples is Red	Swallowed: "Gulp"; All Jacked Up and Full of Worms; Jeepers Creepers: Reborn; Malum
Best Independent Poster	Best Teaser Poster
Summering; Rounding; Emily the Criminal; Wildflower: "Bloom"	Tár; Corsage; John Wick: Chapter 4: "Hourglass Portrait"; Paint
Best Thriller Poster	Best Wildposts
Cocaine Bear: "Payoff"; Sharper: "Kaleidoscope"; Significant Other; Watcher	John Wick: Chapter 4: "Illumicade"; Black Adam; Shazam! Fury of the Gods; Songs of Earth
Most Original Poster	Best Motion Poster
Don't Worry Darling; Champions; Blackberry: "Brickbreaker"; Elton John Live: Farewell from Dodger Stadium	Peter Pan & Wendy: "Marriott Magic"; Black Panther: Wakanda Forever; Bullet Train; Peter Pan & Wendy: "The Grove"
Best Animation/Family Poster for a TV/Streaming Series	Best Comedy Poster for a TV/Streaming Series
The Muppets Mayhem: "Payoff"; American Born Chinese; Mike Judge's Beavis & Butt-Head; The Mysterious Benedict Society (Season 2): "Key Art"	Only Murders in the Building (Season 2); Barry (Season 4); Reservation Dogs (Season 2): "One Sheet"; The Goldbergs (Season 10)
Best Documentary/Reality Poster for a TV/Streaming Series	Best Drama/Action Poster for a TV/Streaming Series
The Hair Tales; The Big Brunch; The Deep End; The Last Movie Stars	The Watchful Eye; Mike; Succession (Season 4): "Domestic Payoff"; Tulsa King
Best Horror/Thriller Poster for a TV/Streaming Series	Best WildPosts for a TV/Streaming Series
Guillermo del Toro's Cabinet of Curiosities; 1899; Pretty Little Liars: Original Sin; Yellowjackets: "Teen Queen"	Swarm; Daisy Jones & the Six; The Power; Welcome to Chippendales

Radio

Best Radio/Audio Spot (For a Feature Film or TV/Streaming Series)
- Cocaine Bear: "Ursa Coca"
  - Black Panther: Wakanda Forever
  - John Wick: Chapter 4: "King"
  - Reasonable Doubt: "Truth"
  - Ted Lasso (Season 3): "Return Radio"

=== 2024 ===
The 24th Golden Trailer Awards were presented in Los Angeles on May 30, 2024. The nominations were announced on May 7, 2024.

Show

Best Action	Best Animation/Family
Monkey Man: "Beast"; Boy Kills World: "Rejoice"; Mission: Impossible – Dead Reckoning Part One: "Ghost"; The Beekeeper: "Honey Red"; The Fall Guy: "Thumps Up"	Wonka: "Silver Lining"; Elio: "The Call"; IF: "See"; Inside Out 2: "Change"; Spider-Man: Across the Spider-Verse: "Choice"
Best Comedy	Best Documentary – Subject
American Fiction: "Monk"; Fly Me to the Moon: "Connection"; The Beanie Bubble: "Brownie Fortune"; The Fall Guy: "Twist"; The Family Plan: "New Life"	20 Days in Mariupol; The Longest Goodbye: "Mom"; The Mission; The Space Race: "Imagine"; Vice News Presents- City Under Fire: Inside the War in Ukraine: "Trailer"
Best Documentary – Bio Pic of an Individual	Best Drama
American Symphony: "Butterfly"; Giannis: The Marvelous Journey: "Sensation"; Steve! (Martin): A Documentary in 2 Pieces: "Change Trailer"; The Disappearance of Shere Hite; The Pigeon Tunnel: "Secrets"	Napoleon: "Destiny"; Back to Black: "Voice"; Killers of the Flower Moon: "Money"; The Boys in the Boat: "Trust"; The Creator: "Protection"
Best Fantasy/Adventure	Best Horror
Dune: Part Two: "War"; Borderlands: "Make It Rain"; Furiosa: A Mad Max Saga: "Home"; Kingdom of the Planet of the Apes: "Dream"; Wonka: "Silver Lining"	Late Night with the Devil: "Shocking"; Cuckoo: "Lucky"; Talk to Me: "Connect"; The Exorcist: Believer: "Official Trailer"; The First Omen: "Child"
Best Independent Trailer	Best Music
Anatomy of a Fall: "Monster"; Civil War: "Home"; Eileen: "Crazy"; Sing Sing: "Reality Trailer"; We Grown Now	Barbie: "Just Ken Teaser"; Joker: Folie à Deux: "Love"; Monkey Man: "Beast"; Napoleon: "Destiny"; Bob Marley: One Love: "Change"
Best Thriller	Best Video Game Trailer
Anatomy of a Fall: "Monster"; Leave the World Behind: "Bad Dream"; Joker: Folie à Deux: "Love"; Love Lies Bleeding: "Threat"; The Killer: "Breathe"	Cyberpunk 2077: Phantom Liberty: "All In"; Mortal Kombat 1: "Answer the Call"; Call of Duty: Modern Warfare III; Star Wars Outlaws: "Story Trailer"; Suicide Squad: Kill the Justice League: "No More Heroes"
Golden Fleece	Most Original Trailer
The Kill Room: "Shout!"; Campton Manor; Pet Sematary: "Resurrection"; Retribution: "Ride"; Treasure Fellowship	They Cloned Tyrone: "Freaky"; Boy Kills World: "Trailer"; Late Night with the Devil: "Shocking"; The First Omen: "Fear"; The Killer: "Blitz Teaser"
Best Summer 2024 Blockbuster Trailer	Best Foreign Teaser
Deadpool & Wolverine: "Taken"; Furiosa: A Mad Max Saga: "The Promise"; Kingdom of the Planet of the Apes: "New Trust"; The Fall Guy: "Twist"; Twisters: "Chance"	Bird Box Barcelona: "Official Teaser"; Gundi – A Legend of Love; No More Bets: "Official Trailer"; The Beast: "Obliterate Trailer"; The Boy and the Heron: "Official Teaser Trailer"
Best Foreign Action	Best Foreign Animation/Family
Guest from the Future: "Trailer"; Mayhem!: "Beast"; Eye for an Eye: The Blind Swordsman: "US Trailer"; Godzilla Minus One; Major Grom: The Game: "Last Hero Teaser Trailer"	The Boy and the Heron: "Official English Trailer"; Four Souls of Coyote: "International Trailer"; Loups Garous: "Beasts Teaser"; The Flying Ship: "The Dream"; The Wizard of Oz: "Teaser Trailer"
Best Foreign Comedy	Best Foreign Documentary
The Movie Emperor: "Official Trailer"; Baby Assassins 2; Bucket List of the Dead; WE 12; We Might As Well Be Dead	Copa 71: "Trailer"; Getting It Back: The Story of Cymande Trailer; Otto Baxter: Not a F***ing Horror Story: "Trailer"; NASTY: "Trailer 2"; Wham!: "Greatness"
Best Foreign Drama	Best Foreign Horror
Anatomy of a Fall: "Monster"; Joika; Society of the Snow: "Hope"; The Great Escaper: "Escape"; The Kitchen: "Official Trailer 2"	Run Rabbit Run: "Official Trailer"; Baghead; Double Blind: "Trailer"; Only the River Flows: "Official Trailer"
Best Foreign Independent Trailer	Best Foreign Music
Anatomy of a Fall: "Official UK Trailer"; La Chimera; Perfect Days: "Trailer"; Skunk: "Theatrical Trailer"; The Boy and the Heron: "Official English Trailer"	Major Grom: The Game: "Last Hero Teaser Trailer"; Callas Paris 1958; Cassandro; Guest from the Future: "Trailer"; The Biggest Moon: "Trailer"
Best Foreign Thriller	Most Original Foreign Trailer
Monolith: "Listen"; Bird Box Barcelona: "Official Trailer"; Dogman: "Exclusive Trailer for CIS Countries"; Paradise: "Clock Tease"; The Man from Nowhere: "Trailer"	Cassandro: "Libre"; No More Bets: "Official Trailer"; Oldboy: "Masterpiece"; The Movie Emperor: "Official Trailer"; To the Lake
Best Teaser	Other Awards
Deadpool & Wolverine: "Taken"; Late Night with the Devil: "Shocking"; Pain Hustlers: "Warning"; Saltburn: "Real"; The Killer: "Blitz Teaser"	Best of Show: Deadpool & Wolverine: "Taken"; Agency of the Year: AV Squad

Non-Show (Theatrical)

The Don LaFontaine Award for Best Voice Over	Best Motion/Title Graphics
Boy Kills World: "Trailer"; Late Night with the Devil: "Shocking"; The Inventor; The Iron Claw: "Brothers Trailer"; The Killer: "Blitz Teaser"	Borderlands: "Make It Rain" (winner: Create Advertising Group); Divinity: "Green Band"; Eileen: "Crazy"; Saltburn: "Real"; Wonka: "Silver Lining"
Best Sound Editing	Best Original Score
Monkey Man: "Beast"; Boy Kills World: "Rejoice"; Dune: Part Two: "War"; Napoleon: "Destiny"; The Killer: "Breathe"	Dune: Part Two: "War"; Fair Play: "Taking Over"; Killers of the Flower Moon: "Luck"; Origin: "Inside Voice"; The Killer: "Blitz Teaser"
Best Faith-Based Trailer	Best Romance
Unsung Hero: "Miracles"; God + Country: "Official Trailer"; Sound of Freedom: "Save Them Trailer"; Surprised by Oxford; The Shift: "Finding the Light"	Maestro: "Awards Summer Trailer"; All of Us Strangers: "Trailer"; Fingernails: "Love"; Fly Me to the Moon: "Connection"; The Greatest Hits: "Timeless"
Best Independent Trailer (for film budget shot under $3.1 million)	Trashiest Trailer
Fremont; The Last Stop in Yuma County: "Shoot 'Em Up"; Your Lucky Day; Kill Two Birds; When Evil Lurks: "Condemned"	Suitable Flesh: "Saxy"; Boy Kills World: "Rejoice"; KILLHER: "Truth and Lies"; Slay; The Marvels: "Meowvels"

TV Spot (Theatrical)

Best Action TV Spot (for a Feature Film)	Best Comedy TV Spot (for a Feature Film)
Monkey Man: "Warrior"; Civil War: "Mission"; Mission: Impossible – Dead Reckoning Part One: "Operative"; Napoleon: "General"; The Fall Guy: "Gosling"	Barbie: "Loose"; Next Goal Wins: "Stages Review"; Poor Things: "The World"; The Fall Guy: "Gosling"; The Holdovers: "Harvard"
Best Drama TV Spot (for a Feature FIlm)	Best Fantasy Adventure TV Spot (for a Feature Film)
Killers of the Flower Moon: "Bloodshed"; Killers of the Flower Moon: "Murders"; Leave the World Behind: "Skeptic"; Oppenheimer: "Music Review"; Oppenheimer: "Atmosphere"	Dune: Part Two: "One Destiny"; Deadpool & Wolverine: "Gametime"; They Cloned Tyrone: "Alternate Teaser"; Wicked: "Destiny"; Wonka: "Bate Bate"
Best Foreign TV Spot (for a Feature Film)	Best Graphics in a TV Spot (for a Feature Film)
Favorite Movies; IMPACTFUL MOVIES; Movies Whithout Limits; PROJECT MIDNIGHT; Society of the Snow: "Flight"	Indiana Jones and the Dial of Destiny: "The Map of Adventures"; Guardians of the Galaxy Vol. 3: "Hallway Review"; Lisa Frankenstein: "Countdown"; The Family Plan: "BDE Announce"; They Cloned Tyrone: "Beneath Our Feet"
Best Horror TV Spot (for a Feature Film)	Best Independent TV Spot
The Exorcist: Believer: "Drop"; A Quiet Place: Day One: "Breathe"; Immaculate: "Mother"; Leave the World Behind: "Elevator"; The Exorcist: Believer: "All of Them"	Ferrari: "Review"; Bobcat Moretti: "My Name"; NEW TV3: "Image Trailer"; The Holdovers: "Stuck"
Best Music TV Spot (for a Feature Film)	Best Original Score TV Spot (for a Feature Film)
Bob Marley: One Love: "Don't Worry" (winner: Create Advertising Group); Guardians of the Galaxy Vol. 3: "Jammin in the Meantime"; Next Goal Wins: "Stages Review"; Past Lives: "In-Yun"; Saltburn: "Moth"	The Marvels: "Return of Captain Marvel"; Barbie: "Feel"; Barbie: "Human"; Cloud Atlas; Premialnoe: "Tricolor"
Best Romance TV Spot (for a Feature Film)	Best Sound Editing in a TV Spot (for a Feature Film)
Past Lives: "Fate"; Killers of the Flower Moon: "River"; Past Lives: "Remember"	Monkey Man: "Blood"; Ferrari: "Win"; Leave the World Behind: "Skeptic"; The Killer: "One Thousand"; Sound of Metal: "The Sound of Metal Binaural Experience"
Best Thriller TV Spot (for a Feature Film)	Best Voice-Over TV Spot (for a Feature Film)
Saltburn: "Moth"; Killers of the Flower Moon: "Lies"; Leave the World Behind: "Skeptic"; Oppenheimer: "Quiet Review"; The Killer: "One Thousand"	Leave the World Behind: "Survival PSA"; Haunted Mansion: "Welcome to the Haunted Mansion"; Thanksgiving: "Rhyme"; The Iron Claw: "Collectible"; The Killer: "Redundancy"
Most Original TV Spot (for a Feature Film)
The Fall Guy: "Everything"; Monkey Man: "Levels"; Saltburn: "Turning the Handle"; The Creator: "Breathe"; The Killer: "Redundancy"

TV/Streaming Series

Best Action (Trailer/Teaser/TV Spot) for a TV/Streaming Series	Best Animation/Family (Trailer/Teaser/TV Spot) for a TV/Streaming Series
The Gentlemen: "Bleep"; Fallout: "Set The World On Fire"; Jack Ryan (Season 4): "Convergence"; The Continental: From the World of John Wick: "Welcome"; Citadel: "The Deepfake Trailer"	Percy Jackson and the Olympians: "Quest Teaser Trailer"; Goosebumps: "Haunted Hero"; I Am Groot (Season 2): "Treat"; Star Wars: Tales of the Empire: "Choice"; Star Wars: The Bad Batch: "The Final Season"
Best Comedy (Trailer/Teaser/TV Spot) for a TV/Streaming Series	Best Documentary (Trailer/Teaser/TV Spot) for a TV/Streaming Series
Palm Royale: "Join the Club"; Curb Your Enthusiasm: "Goodbye TRLR"; Only Murders in the Building (Season 3): "Break a Leg"; The Great (Season 3): "Faith"; The Muppets Mayhem: "Happy"	American Nightmare: "Truth" (winner: Create Advertising Group); Enfield Poltergeist: "Janet"; Life on Our Planet: "Luca Trailer"; Savior Complex: "Details"; Under Pressure: The U.S. Women's World Cup Team: "Official Trailer"
Best Drama (Trailer/Teaser/TV Spot) for a TV/Streaming Series	Best Fantasy Adventure (Trailer/Teaser/TV Spot) for a TV/Streaming Series
Griselda: "La Jefa"; Lessons in Chemistry: "Living"; Spy/Master: "Burn"; Top Boy (Season 3): "Official Trailer"; True Detective: Night Country: "Teaser 2"	Loki (Season 2): "God"; 3 Body Problem: "The Reply"; Renegade Nell: "Wanted"; The Acolyte: "Power and Respect"; The Witcher (Season 3): "Trailer"
Best Foreign TV Spot/Trailer/Teaser for a TV/Streaming Series	Best Graphics for a TV/Streaming Series (Trailer/Teaser/TV Spot)
Bodies: "Impossible Trailer"; Das Signal; Deadloch (Season 1): "Heat"; Mary & George: "Monsters"; Sweet Home (Season 2): "Human"	Loki (Season 2): "War"; 3 Body Problem: "The Reply"; 8 Months: "Conspiracy"; Blue Eye Samurai: "Ink Blot Teaser"; Death and Other Details: "Aboard"
Best Horror/Thriller (Trailer/Teaser/TV Spot) for a TV/Streaming Series	Best Music for a TV/Streaming Series (Trailer/Teaser/TV Spot)
The Fall of the House of Usher: "Consequence"; Goosebumps: "TV60 Haunted"; Dark City: The Cleaner; The Walking Dead: The Ones Who Live: "Together"; Them: The Scare: "Fear"	The Crown (Season 6): "Part Two" (winner: Create Advertising Group); 3 Body Problem: "The Reply"; Dark City: The Cleaner; The Gentlemen: "Teaser"; Top Boy (Season 3): "Official Trailer"
Best Original Score for a TV/Streaming Series (Trailer/Teaser/TV Spot)	Best Sound Editing for a TV/Streaming Series (Trailer/Teaser/TV Spot)
Masters of the Air: "Mankind"; Echo: "Again"; House of the Dragon: "Official Green and Black Trailers"; Star Trek: Strange New Worlds (Season 2): "Subspace Rhapsody Lyric Videos"; Star Wars: The Bad Batch: "The Final Season"	The Gentlemen: "Teaser" (winner: Create Advertising Group); All The Light We Cannot See: "Listen"; Loki (Season 2): "Timeslipping"; Shōgun: "Secret Heart"; The Walking Dead Universe: "Breathe"
Best Voice Over for a TV/Streaming Series (Trailer/Teaser/TV Spot)	Most Original TV Spot/Trailer/Teaser for a Series
A Real Bug's Life; Life on Our Planet: "Reborn Teaser"; Queens; The Boys (Season 4): "Teaser"; The Wonder Years (Season 2): "Trailer"	Enfield Poltergeist: "Janet"; Death and Other Details: "All Aboard"; Griselda: "Allegedly Review"; Spy/Master: "Character Teaser"; The Great: "Recap"
Best OTO (One Time Only) Special	Best Promo for a TV Network
FX: "Star Wars Movie Marathon"; Academy of Motion Picture Arts and Sciences: "Presenting the 2024 Best Picture Nominees"; Netflix: The Netflix Cup "Swing to Survive"; ABC: "The Oscars 2024 - Oscarsland"; Video Assist Hungary: "2023 Showreel"	Paramount+ with SHOWTIME: "A Mountain of Entertainment 4.0"; Apple TV+: "Time"; FXX Network: "Everything"; PBS: Frontline 40th Anniversary; SYFY: "SYFY Movies"

Digital & Innovation

Best Digital – Action	Best Digital – Animation/Family
Guardians of the Galaxy Vol. 3: "One Last Ride"; Enter the Dragon: "50th Anniversary Trailer"; Fast X: "Popcorn Lunacy"; Oldboy: "Rated R"; The Creator: "Breathe"	Wonka: "Family"; Doctor Who: "Sonic Screwdriver Reveal"; Taylor Swift: The Eras Tour: "Ready for It"; The Super Mario Bros. Movie: "Biggest Adventure"; Wonka: "Sing"
Best Digital – Comedy	Best Digital – Drama
Barbie: "Monolith"; Asteroid City: "Spaceman"; Minx (Season 2): "Sex Advice"; Poor Things: "DIG Director 1x1"; Strays: "Love It"	Death and Other Details: "Aboard"; Anatomy of a Fall: "Prelude"; Dune: Part Two: "Epic Story"; Shōgun: "Secret Review"; The Crown (Season 6): "Series Recap"
Best Digital – Fantasy Adventure	Best Digital – Horror/Thriller
Dune: Part Two: "Collection"; Damsel: "I Got You"; Indiana Jones and the Dial of Destiny: "Adventure Awaits"; Nextlix's Avatar: The Last Airbender (Season 1): "Odyssey"; Poor Things: "One, Two, Three"	Anatomy of a Fall: "Prelude"; A Haunting in Venice: "Party"; Inception: "Tricolor"; Five Nights at Freddy's: "Trailer Hello"; The Killer: "Echoes"
Most Innovative Advertising for a Feature Film	Best Action/Thriller TrailerByte for a Feature Film
The Iron Claw; Kung Fu Panda 4: "World Wildlife Fund PSA"; Priscilla: "Half Magic"; Teenage Mutant Ninja Turtles: Mutant Mayhem: "Turtle Documentary"; The Hunger Games: The Ballad of Songbirds & Snakes: "Emergency Warning"	Indiana Jones and the Dial of Destiny: "Who Are You"; Argylle: "Who Are You"; Dune: Part Two: "Cruel World"; Monkey Man: "Smash"; Oldboy: "Rated R"
Best Animation TrailerByte for a Feature Film	Best Comedy/Drama TrailerByte for a Feature Film
The Little Mermaid: "Ursula's Lair"; Teenage Mutant Ninja Turtles: Mutant Mayhem: "How to Make a Turtle"; Teenage Mutant Ninja Turtles: Mutant Mayhem: "Camera Roll"; Teenage Mutant Ninja Turtles: Mutant Mayhem: "Ninja Stars"	Anatomy of a Fall: "Stencil"; All of Us Strangers; Anyone but You: "Tea"; Asteroid City: "Yes - Cast"; Poor Things: "Your Creation"
Best Horror/Thriller TrailerByte for a Feature Film	Best Viral Campaign for a Feature Film
Talk to Me: "Group Chat"; Five Nights at Freddy's: "Quite the Character" / "Freddy"; Immaculate: "Descend"; Thanksgiving: "Marked"; The First Omen: "Callback"	Saltburn: "Integrated Campaign"; Guardians of the Galaxy Vol. 3: "Viral Campaign"; Indiana Jones and the Dial of Destiny: "Viral Campaign"; Priscilla: "Digital Campaign"; The Iron Claw: "Campaign"
Most Innovative Advertising for a TV/Streaming Series	Best Action/Thriller TrailerByte for a TV/Streaming Series
Only Murders in the Building (Season 3): "Broadway"; Goosebumps: "Triple Play Activations"; Only Murders in the Building (Season 3): "Backstage at the Goosebure Experience"; Citadel: "The Deepfake Trailer"; Top Boy: "A Portrait of a Boy"	Echo: "Like Father Like Daughter"; What If...?: "Comic Strip"; Cruel Summer (Season 2): "Fatal Error Social Video"; Secret Invasion: "Who Do You Trust"; The Other Black Girl: "Wagner D&I"
Best Comedy/Drama TrailerByte for a TV/Streaming Series	Best Viral Campaign for a TV/Streaming Series
Only Murders in the Building (Season 3): "Broadway"; Life & Beth (Season 2): "Volleyball Champ"; The Crown (Season 6): "Royal Progress Queen"; The Other Black Girl: "Wagner D&I"; The Bear: "Smashing"	3 Body Problem: "You Are Bugs Viral Campaign"; Animayhem: Enter the Second Dimension Activation at SDCC; Cruel Summer (Season 2): "Paid Social Campaign"; Feud: Capote vs. The Swans: "Campaign"; The Golden Bachelor: "Los Angeles Experiential Campaign"
Best BTS/EPK for a Feature Film (Under 2 minutes)	Best BTS/EPK for a Feature Film (Over 2 minutes)
Oppenheimer: "Trinity Test"; Indiana Jones and the Dial of Destiny: "The Map of Adventures"; Killers of the Flower Moon: "Inside First Look"; Poor Things: "Bella"; The Iron Claw: "Wresting Legends"	Mission: Impossible – Dead Reckoning Part One: "Train Adventure"; Barbie: "Just Ken Music Video"; Bob Marley: One Love: "Right Time"; Fallen Leaves; The Killer: "Directing EPK"
Best BTS/EPK for a TV/Streaming Series (Under 2 minutes)	Best BTS/EPK for a TV/Streaming Series (Over 2 minutes)
Loki (Season 2): "The Amazing Loki"; Ahsoka: "Ahsoka in 30"; Mr. & Mrs. Smith: "Meet the Smiths"; Percy Jackson and the Olympians: "Finding Percy Jackson Featurette"; X-Men '97: "A New Age"	Masters of the Air: "Front Lines: The Production"; Painkiller: "Stranger Than Fiction"; Silo (Season 1): "An Inside Look – Building a World"; The Continental: From the World of John Wick: "Inside Night 3"; The New Look: "An Inside Look"

Poster

Best Action Poster	Best Animation/Family Poster
Napoleon: "Charge"; Furiosa: A Mad Max Saga: "One Sheet"; Mission: Impossible – Dead Reckoning Part One: "Ghost"; Road House: "Take It Outside"	Wonka: "One Sheet"; Doctor Who: "Episode One"; Merry Little Batman: "Gargoyle Key Art"; The Boy and the Heron: "Poster A"
Best Billboard (for Feature Film or TV/Streaming Series)	Best Comedy Poster
Wonka: "Chocolate Billboard"; Cruel Summer (Season 2); Percy Jackson and the Olympians; The Creator: "Destroy Billboard"	Drive-Away Dolls: "Payoff Poster"; Poolman: "Vertical, Fable"; Problemista: "Key Art"; The Muppets Mayhem: "Key Art"
Best Documentary Poster	Best Drama Poster
Breaking Olympia: The Phil Heath Story: "Let The Games Begin"; As We Speak, Rap Music On Trial; Preconceived: "Deception"; Vice News Presents- City Under Fire: Inside the War in Ukraine: "Key Art"	The Boys in the Boat; Napoleon: "Chair"; The Holdovers: "Payoff Poster"; The Iron Claw: "Payoff"
Best Foreign Poster	Best Horror Poster
The Monk and the Gun: "Innocence"; Ka Whawhai Tonu; Monster; We Might As Well Be Dead	Abigail: "One Sheet"; Immaculate: "Key Art"; Longlegs: "Teaser 1"; Talk to Me
Best Independent Poster	Best International Poster
Poolman: "Vertical, Fable"; Unmoored; War Pony: "Truth"; Your Lucky Day	Anatomy of a Fall; Aquaman and the Lost Kingdom: "International One Sheet"; Godzilla Minus One; John Wick: Chapter 4: "International Payoff"
Best Thriller Poster	Best Wildposts
A Haunting in Venice: "Dolby Exclusive Poster"; Oldboy: "Payoff"; Saltburn: "One Sheet"; Your Lucky Day: "Key Art"	They Cloned Tyrone: "Wildposting"; Anatomy of a Fall; Lift: "Character Banners"; Saltburn: "Skittles Character Posters"
Most Original Poster	Best Motion Poster
They Cloned Tyrone: "Key Art"; Sasquatch Sunset; Teenage Mutant Ninja Turtles: Mutant Mayhem; The King Tide: "Many Thanks to Isla"; The Sweet East	Elemental: "Marriott Big Kahuna"; Civil War: "Motion Poster"; Elemental: "Grove"; The Little Mermaid
Best Animation/Family Poster for a TV/Streaming Series	Best Comedy Poster for a TV/Streaming Series
Blue Eye Samurai; American Born Chinese: "Key Art"; Invincible: "Bus Tease Art"; Star Trek: The Animated Celebration: "Key Art"	Frasier; Breeders (Season 4); Minx (Season 2): "Key Art"; The Great (Season 3): "Key Art"
Best Documentary/Reality Poster for a TV/Streaming Series	Best Drama/Action Poster for a TV/Streaming Series
Beckham: "Key Art"; Better Angels: The Gospel According to Tammy Faye; Earth – Iconic; Telemarketers	The Crown (Season 6): "Artwork"; 3 Body Problem: "Satellite Poster"; Death and Other Details: "Key Art"; Fallout: "CX404 Tease Art"
Best Horror/Thriller Poster for a TV/Streaming Series	Best Teaser Poster
The Changeling; Cruel Summer (Season 2): "Key Art"; The Faceless Lady; The Faceless Lady: "Alternative Poster"	Saltburn: "Teaser Duo"; The Creator: "Teaser Poster"; They Cloned Tyrone: "Key Art"; Wonka: "Teaser"
Best WildPosts for a TV/Streaming Series
House of the Dragon (Season 2): "Character Wildposts"; 3 Body Problem: "Character Posters"; Percy Jackson and the Olympians: "Print Campaign"; The Great (Season 3): "Wildposts"

Radio

Best Radio/Audio Spot (For a Feature Film or TV/Streaming Series)
- Goosebumps: "True Crime Podcast Trailer"
  - All The Light We Cannot See: "Podcast B"
  - All The Light We Cannot See: "Podcast C"
  - Saltburn: "Provocative Radio"
  - The Hunger Games: The Ballad of Songbirds & Snakes: "Voice of the Capitol"

=== 2025 ===
The 25th Golden Trailer Awards were presented in Los Angeles on May 29, 2025. The nominations were announced on May 8, 2025.

Show

Best Action	Best Animation/Family
From the World of John Wick: Ballerina: "Trigger" (Lionsgate / AV Squad); Back in Action (Netflix / AV Squad); Canary Black: "Unstoppable" (Amazon MGM Studios / Tiny Hero); F1 (Warner Bros. / Major Major); The Accountant 2: "Brothers Trailer" (Amazon MGM Studios / Transit)	How to Train Your Dragon: "Beasts" (Universal / Buddha Jones); A Minecraft Movie: "Adventure" (Warner Bros. / Buddha Jones); Elio: "Adventure Place" (Walt Disney Studios & Pixar / Screenland Creative); Piece by Piece: "Life" (Focus Features / Mark Woollen & Associates); Snow White: "Slay" (Walt Disney Studios / Ignition Creative)
Best Comedy	Best Documentary – Subject
Friendship: "Gorgeous" (A24 / GrandSon); Brothers: "New Beginning" (Amazon MGM Studios / X/AV); Saturday Night: "Revolution Trailer" (Sony Pictures Releasing / Zealot); Wolfs: "Partners" (Apple TV+ / AV Squad); You're Cordially Invited: "Love" (Amazon MGM Studios / Tiny Hero)	Blink (National Geographic / Motive Creative); Brothers After War: "Brothers" (Perseverance Productions / Rebel); Skywalkers: A Love Story: "Trailer" (Netflix / Mark Woollen & Associates); The Commandant's Shadow: "Healing" (Warner Bros. / Screenland Creative); The Dark Money Game: "Trailer" (HBO / HBO Marketing)
Best Documentary – Bio Pic of an Individual	Best Drama
Jim Henson Idea Man: "Trailer" (Disney+ / Buddha Jones); Eno (Film First / Jump Cut); Martha: "Perfect" (Netflix / Mark Woollen & Associates); Music by John Williams: "Magical" (Walt Disney Studios & Disney+ / Wild Card Creative Group); One to One: John & Yoko: "Dreamer" (Mercury Studios & Magnolia Pictures / Ignition Creative London)	The Brutalist: "Build" (A24 / Mark Woollen & Associates); A Complete Unknown: "Spark" (Searchlight Pictures / Wild Card Creative Group); Gladiator II: "War" (Paramount Pictures / AV Squad); The Alto Knights: "War" (Warner Bros. Discovery / Bond); The Luckiest Man in America: "Big Bucks" (IFC Films / Zealot)
Best Fantasy/Adventure	Best Horror
Wicked: "Wickedness" (Universal Pictures / Trailer Park Group); Deadpool & Wolverine: "Missionary" (Walt Disney Studios / Mocean); Megalopolis: "Genius" (Lionsgate / Buddha Jones); Mickey 17: "Life" (Warner Bros. / Jax); Thunderbolts*: "The Glory" (Marvel Studios / Wild Card Creative Group)	Sinners: "Magic" (Warner Bros. Pictures / AV Squad); 28 Years Later: "Days" (Sony / Buddha Jones); Heretic: "Witness" (A24 / AV Squad); The Monkey: "Furry Friend" (Neon / Requiem); The Rule of Jenny Pen: "The End Teaser" (IFC Films / Zealot)
Best Independent Trailer	Best Music
Anora: "Love Story" (Neon / GrandSon); It's What's Inside: "Red Trailer" (Netflix / Zealot); Kneecap: "Redband" (Curzon / Silk Factory); Omni Loop: "Trailer" (Magnolia Pictures / Tonnelier Creative); The Surfer: "Suffer" (Roadside Attractions / AV Squad)	Mickey 17: "Life" (Warner Bros. / Jax); Blink (National Geographic / Motive Creative); Jim Henson Idea Man: "Trailer" (Disney+ / Buddha Jones); Sinners: "Magic" (Warner Bros. Pictures / AV Squad); Wicked (Universal / Major Major)
Best Thriller	Best Video Game Trailer
Black Bag: "Loyalty" (Focus Features / Wild Card Creative Group); Blink Twice (Amazon MGM Studios / AV Squad); Him: "Transcend" (Universal Pictures / AV Squad); Rebel Ridge: "Nah" (Netflix / Mark Woollen & Associates); Woman of the Hour: "Seen" (Netflix / Buddha Jones)	Call of Duty: Black Ops 6: "Zombies Reveal Trailer" (Activision / Aspect); Call of Duty: "Call of Duty x Squid Game 2 Trailer" (Activision / Aspect); Helldivers 2: "Omens of Tyranny" (PlayStation Studios Creative / PlayStation Studios Creative); MultiVersus: "Official Launch: Starts Collide, Pies Fly" (WB Games / Create Advertising Group); Nobody Wants to Die: "Trailer" (Critical Hit Games / Critical Hit Games)
Golden Fleece	Most Original Trailer
Megalopolis: "Now" (American Zoetrope / Mark Woollen & Associates); Borderlands: "Trigger Happy" (Lionsgate / Create Advertising Group); Dirty Angels: "The Line" (Lionsgate / AV Squad); Frankie Freako: "Trailer: Party" (Shout! Studios / Taylor Nickerson A/V & Tonnelier Creative); In the Lost Lands (Vertical / Sequence Creative)	28 Years Later: "Days" (Sony / Buddha Jones); Here: "Life Trailer" (Sony Pictures / Zealot); Kneecap: "Redband" (Curzon / Silk Factory); Sew Torn (The Playmaker Munich / Good Hands); The Brutalist: "America" (A24 / Mark Woollen & Associates)
Best Summer 2025 Blockbuster Trailer	Best Foreign Teaser
Mission: Impossible – The Final Reckoning: "Certainty" (Paramount Pictures / AV Squad); From the World of John Wick: Ballerina: "Fate" (Lionsgate / AV Squad); F1 (Warner Bros. / Major Major); Superman: "Fight" (DC Studios / Wild Card Creative Group); The Fantastic Four: First Steps: "Celebrate Trailer" (Walt Disney Pictures / Transit)	Deti Peremen (NMG Studio – START Studio / Trailermakers); Heart of the Hunter: "Teaser" (Netflix / Whitebat); Beating Hearts: "Official Teaser" (Studiocanal / Zealot); Seeking Haven for Mr. Rambo (Filim Clinic / Markos Erian); The World Creativity Project (Hermann Vaske's Emotional Network / Hermann Vaske's Emotional Network)
Best Foreign Action	Best Foreign Animation/Family
Twilight of the Warriors: Walled In (Well Go USA Entertainment / Sequence Creative); Fear City: "Trailer" (RB Production / Stanislav Ivanov); Go for Broke: "Final Trailer" (MaoYan Movie / NUROSTAR); Stockholm Bloodbath (Brainstorm Media / Sequence Creative); William Tell: "Battle" (Altitude / Silk Factory)	Flow: "Journey" (Curzon / Silk Factory); Curious Varvara: "Wink" (Kargo Film / Evgeny Makharashvili); Flow: "Horizon" (Sideshow / Mark Woollen & Associates); Memoir of a Snail: "Official Trailer" (Madman Films / Intermission Film); The Wizard of the Emerald City: "Together" (Central Partnership, KINOSLOVO, CGF, Andrei Solodovnikov)
Best Foreign Comedy	Best Foreign Documentary
The Fisherman (Luu Vision Media / THE FILM AGENCY); Addition: "Plus One" (Roadshow / Ignition Creative); Son of a Rich (Kunay Film / Trailer Cola); Superboys of Malegaon: "Dreamers" (Amazon Prime India / Wild Card Creative Group); Zero: "Official Trailer" (Well Go USA Entertainment / Zealot)	Any Other Way: The Jackie Shane Story (Banger Films + NFB / StageNameCreative); Black Box Diaries (MTV Documentary Films / Jump Cut); Six Inches of Soil (DragonLight Films / Chinagraph); The Man with 1000 Kids: "Twisted" (Netflix / Ignition Creative London); The Promise: "Theatrical Trailer" (Wit Film / The Pastry Shop)
Best Foreign Drama	Best Foreign Horror
Nuremberg (TNT4 Channel / TNT4 Channel); Mr Burton: "Official Trailer" (Independent Entertainment / Zealot); The North Pole: "Central Partnership" (Russkiy Sever Film Company / Trailermakers); The Poet: "Final Trailer" (Central Partnership, Kinoslovo, Studio TriTe, Fond Kino); The Poet: "In Complete Darkness" (Central Partnership, Kinoslovo, Andrei Solodovnikov)	The Radleys: "Bloodline" (Sky UK / Trailer Park Group); Grafted (Shudder, Sequence Creative); Don't Turn Around (Tubi / Rubber Sole Creative); Starve Acre (Brainstorm Media / Sequence Creative); Went Up the Hill (Causeway Films & POP Film / Intermission Film)
Best Foreign Independent Trailer	Best Foreign Music
Broken Bird (Catalyst Studio / Good Hands); Marching Powder: "Redband" (True Brit / Silk Factory); Nuremberg (TNT4 Channel / TNT4 Channel); The Girl with the Needle: "Trailer" (Mubi / Mubi Lab); Zero: "Official Trailer" (Well Go USA Entertainment / Zealot)	Emilia Pérez: "Bingo" (Netflix / Big Picture Entertainment); Fear City: "Trailer" (RB Production / Stanislav Ivanov); Nuremberg (TNT4 Channel / TNT4 Channel); The Poet: "Final Trailer" (Central Partnership, Kinoslovo, Studio TriTe, Fond Kino); There: "My Lighthouse" (BAZELEVS / Andrei Solodovnikov)
Best Foreign Thriller	Most Original Foreign Trailer
Ad Vitam: "Last Chance" (Netflix / Ignition Creative London); A Place Called Silence (Maoyan Entertainment / Ackue studio); Nuremberg (TNT4 Channel / TNT4 Channel); The Platform 2: "Chaos" (Netflix Spain / Trailer Park Group); The Seed of the Sacred Fig: "Curse" (Neon / GrandSon)	Kneecap: "Redband" (Curzon / Silk Factory); Armand: "Laugh" (IFC Films / Mark Woollen & Associates); Nuremberg (TNT4 Channel / TNT4 Channel); Sew Torn (The Playmaker Munich / Good Hands); The Fisherman (Luu Vision Media / The Film Agency)
Best Teaser
M3GAN 2.0: "The Icon" (Universal Pictures / Inside Job); Companion: "Heat Teaser" (Warner Brothers Pictures / Zealot); The Last Showgirl: "Final Performance" (Roadside Attractions / GrandSon); The Monkey: "Announcement" (Neon / AV Squad); The Substance: "Teaser" (Mubi / Mubi Lab)
Best of Show	Agency of the Year
28 Years Later: "Days" (Sony / Buddha Jones)	AV Squad

Non-Show (Theatrical)

The Don LaFontaine Award for Best Voice Over	Best Motion/Title Graphics
28 Years Later: "Days" (Sony / Buddha Jones); Beverly Hills Cop: Axel F: "Trailer: 80s Throwback" (Netflix / REBEL); Frankie Freako: "Trailer: Party" (Shout! Studios / Taylor Nickerson A/V & Tonnelier Creative); Megalopolis: "Genius" (Lionsgate / Buddha Jones); The Woman in the Yard: "Ask" (Universal / Buddha Jones)	The Alto Knights: "War" (Warner Bros. Discovery / Bond); Call of Duty: Black Ops 6: "Story So Far" (Activision / Aspect); Carry-On: "The Bag" (Netflix / X/AV); The Luckiest Man in America: "Big Bucks" (IFC Films / Zealot); Trap: "Escape" (Warner Bros. Pictures / AV Squad)
Best Sound Editing	Best Original Score
Sinners: "Seen" (Warner Bros. Pictures / AV Squad); 28 Years Later: "Days" (Sony / Buddha Jones); Bring Her Back: "Trust No One" (A24 / AV Squad); Tattoo (Warner Bros. / Major Major); Wicked: "Wickedness" (Universal Pictures / Trailer Park Group)	One Battle After Another: "Full Trailer" (Warner Brothers / Major Major); Fly (National Geographic / National Geographic); Mission: Impossible – The Final Reckoning: "Certainty" (Paramount Pictures / AV Squad); Nosferatu: "Devourance H”" (Focus Features / Wild Card Creative Group); The Fantastic Four: First Steps: "Celebrate Trailer" (Walt Disney Pictures / Transit)
Best Faith-Based Trailer	Best Romance
Rule Breakers (Angel Studios / Trailer Park Group); A Faith Under Siege: "Trailer" (Fourthsign Productions / Edit Cartel/Mighty Pictures); The Best Christmas Pageant Ever: "Tradition" (Lionsgate / Buddha Jones); The King of Kings: "Fly" (Angel Studios / Trailer Park Group); You Gotta Believe: "Inspire" (Well Go USA Entertainment / Ignition Creative)	A Nice Indian Boy: "Trailer" (Blue Harbor Entertainment / Stampede Studios); The Idea of You (Amazon / Major Major); My Fault: London: "Desire" (Prime Video / Ignition Creative London); On Swift Horses (Sony Pictures Classics / Jump Cut); Queer: "Trailer" (A24 / Mark Woollen & Associates)
Best Independent Trailer Ultra Low (for film budget shot under $3.1 million)	Trashiest Trailer
Sew Torn (The Playmaker Munich / Good Hands); Brothers After War: "Heroes" (Perseverance Productions / Rebel); It's What's Inside: "Red Trailer" (Netflix / Zealot); Kings (Independent / Major Major); Lifeline: "Save Yourself" (Dark Sky Films / Hungry Monster Entertainment)	How to Kill Monsters: "Believe" (Dark Sky Films / Hungry Monster Entertainment); Frankie Freako: "Trailer: Party" (Shout! Studios / Taylor Nickerson A/V & Tonnelier Creative); Krazy House: "Edgelord Wasteland" (XYZ Films / Champ & Pepper); Let's Start a Cult: "Let's Go" (Dark Sky Films / Hungry Monster Entertainment)

TV Spot (Theatrical)

Best Action TV Spot (for a Feature Film)	Best Animation/Family TV Spot (for a Feature Film)
Mission: Impossible – The Final Reckoning: "Crackle" (Paramount Pictures / AV Squad); Deadpool & Wolverine: "Spoilers" (Walt Disney Studios / AV Squad); Gladiator II: "Arena" (Paramount Pictures / Bond); The Ministry of Ungentlemanly Warfare: "Good Old Days" (Lionsgate / Mocean); Wolfs: "Together TV Spot" (Apple TV+ / Zealot)	The Wild Robot: "Academy Love" (Universal Pictures / Inside Job); Mufasa: The Lion King: "Forever IMAX" (Disney Live Action / The Hive); Inside Out 2: "Boys" (Disney / Seismic Productions); Paddington in Peru: "Back" (StudioCanal / Silk Factory); A Minecraft Movie: "Be Mine" (Warner Bros. / Buddha Jones)
Best Comedy TV Spot (for a Feature Film)	Best Documentary TV Spot (for a Feature FIlm)
Deadpool & Wolverine: "Ready" (Walt Disney Studios / AV Squad); Beetlejuice Beetlejuice: "Meet Bob – 30 Spot" (Warner Bros. Pictures / Zealot); Hit Man: "Contact Killer" (Netflix / Trailer Park Group); Saturday Night: "Revolution TV Spot" (Sony Pictures Releasing / Zealot); You're Cordially Invited: "Sabotage" (Prime Video / AV Squad)	Endurance (National Geographic / Mark Woollen & Associates); Blink (National Geographic / Motive Creative); Elton John: Never Too Late: "Memory" (Disney Branded / Ignition Creative); Leonardo da Vinci: "Official Teaser" (PBS, Michael Huddleston, DG Entertainment, SJI Associates); Sugarcane (National Geographic / Silk Factory/Silk Factory GFX)
Best Drama TV Spot (for a Feature FIlm)	Best Fantasy Adventure TV Spot (for a Feature Film)
A Complete Unknown: "Icon" (Searchlight Pictures / AV Squad); A Complete Unknown: "Stranger" (Searchlight Pictures / AV Squad); Back to Black: "Story" (Focus Features / REBEL); Conclave: "Power" (Universal Pictures / Inside Job); Gladiator II: "Greatness" (Paramount Pictures / Create Advertising Group)	Wicked: "Get Ready" (Universal Pictures / Trailer Park Group); Death of a Unicorn (A24 / AV Squad); How to Train Your Dragon: "Warrior" (Universal / Inside Job); A Minecraft Movie: "Be Mine" (Warner Bros. / Buddha Jones); Wicked: "Big Welcome to Oz" (Universal Pictures / Inside Job)
Best Foreign TV Spot (for a Feature Film)	Best Graphics in a TV Spot (for a Feature Film)
Masterfully Crafted Movies (TNT4 Channel / TNT4 Channel); Emilia Pérez: "Bingo 30" (Netflix / Big Picture Entertainment); KinoJam2: "Brand Promo: Life" (KinoJam / KinoJam); The Gift of Music (The Walt Disney Company / TWDC Creative); Yakut Movies on KinoJam1 (KinoJam / KinoJam)	Deadpool & Wolverine: "Come Again" (The Walt Disney Studios / Tiny Hero); Captain America: Brave New World: "The Flag Stripes Inauguration" (The Walt Disney Studios / AV Squad); Carry-On: "Showdown" (Netflix / X/AV); Furiosa: A Mad Max Saga: "War Rig Review" (Warner Bros. / Aspect); Kingdom of the Planet of the Apes: "Light" (The Walt Disney Studios / Tiny Hero)
Best Horror TV Spot (for a Feature Film)	Best Independent TV Spot
The Monkey: "Shit" (Neon / Requiem); Longlegs: "Meeting" (Neon / AV Squad); Nosferatu: "Masterpiece of Horror" (Focus Features / Seismic Productions); Nosferatu: "Little Dream" (Focus Features / AV Squad); Smile 2: "Run" (Paramount / Create Advertising Group)	Anora: "Fun Review Safe" (Universal Pictures / Inside Job); Masterfully Crafted Movies (TNT4 Channel / TNT4 Channel); The Actor (Neon / Livebad Creative); The Monkey: "Shit" (Neon / Requiem)
Best Music TV Spot (for a Feature Film)	Best Romance TV Spot (for a Feature Film)
Blink (National Geographic / Motive Creative); Deadpool & Wolverine: "Max Out" (Walt Disney Studios / Mocean); Wicked: "Fandom" (Universal Pictures / Inside Job); Wicked: "Journey" (Universal Pictures / Trailer Park Group); You're Cordially Invited: "Invitation" (Amazon MGM Studios / Tiny Hero)	Anora: "One Question" (Neon / AV Squad); It Ends with Us: "Start Again" (Sony / Seismic Productions)
Best Sound Editing in a TV Spot (for a Feature Film)	Best Thriller TV Spot (for a Feature Film)
Hit Man: "Breath" (Netflix / Trailer Park Group); Carry-On: "Showdown" (Netflix / X/AV); Gladiator II: "Charge" (Paramount Pictures / Create Advertising Group); Twisters: "Roar" (Universal Pictures / AV Squad); Wicked: "Get Ready" (Universal Pictures / Trailer Park Group)	Sinners: "Ready" (Warner Bros. / Create Advertising Group); Alien: Romulus (The Walt Disney Studios / AV Squad); Carry-On: "Showdown" (Netflix / X/AV); Companion: "30TV Exist" (Warner Bros. / Level Up AV); Trap: "Control" (Warner Bros. / REBEL)
Most Original TV Spot (for a Feature Film)
Masterfully Crafted Movies (TNT4 Channel / TNT4 Channel); Captain America: Brave New World: "Heartbeat" (The Walt Disney Studios / AV Squad); Novocaine: "Pain-Free" (Paramount / Aspect); Piece by Piece: "Buzz" (Focus Features / RAVE Collective); Project Midnight: "Great Works of Art" (Friday! TV Channel / Friday! TV Channel)

TV/Streaming Series

Best Action (Trailer/Teaser) for a TV/Streaming Series	Best Animation/Family (Trailer/Teaser) for a TV/Streaming Series
Senna: "Forever" (Netflix / GrandSon); Duster: "Right On" (Max / Buddha Jones); Paris Has Fallen: "Rise" (StudioCanal / Silk Factory); The Killer: "Reloaded" (Universal Pictures / Inside Job); Those About to Die: "Dangerous Game" (Peacock / Buddha Jones)	Lego Star Wars: Rebuild the Galaxy: "Epic Story" (Disney+ / Silk Factory); #1 Happy Family USA (Amazon MGM Studios / GrandSon); A Real Bug's Life (National Geographic / Ultrabland); Disney Pixar: Dream Productions: "Big Hits Trailer" (Pixar Animation Studios / The Hive); Exploding Kittens: "Hype" (Netflix / Zealot)
Best Comedy (Trailer/Teaser) for a TV/Streaming Series	Best Documentary (Trailer/Teaser) for a TV/Streaming Series
The Studio: "Movies" (Apple TV+ / Wild Card Creative Group); Bad Monkey: "Suspect" (Apple / InSync Plus); Nobody Wants This: "Hot Rabbi" (Netflix / Trailer Park Group); Only Murders in the Building: "S4 Trailer" (Hulu / Create Advertising Group); Time Bandits: "All Times Trailer" (Apple TV+ / Aspect)	Surviving Black Hawk Down: "Courage" (Netflix / Wild Card Creative Group); Cult Massacre: One Day in Jonestown (National Geographic / Mattock/Motion 504); Secrets & Spies: A Nuclear Game: "Secrets" (MAX / Zealot); Missing: "Trailer" (Netflix / Bond); Tsunami: Race Against Time (National Geographic / Aspect)
Best Drama (Trailer/Teaser) for a TV/Streaming Series	Best Fantasy Adventure (Trailer/Teaser) for a TV/Streaming Series
Severance: "Season 2 RTO Teaser" (Apple TV+ / Transit); Landman: "Oil Teaser" (Paramount+ / Zealot); The Last of Us: "S2 North" (HBO / Create Advertising Group); The Penguin: "Untouchable" (HBO / Mocean); Your Friends & Neighbors: "Petty Crime" (Apple TV+ / Tiny Hero)	House of the Dragon: "Season 2: Official Trailer" (HBO MAX / Intermission Film); Dune: Prophecy: "Power" (HBO / Concept Arts); The Lord of the Rings: The Rings of Power: "Season 2: Shadow" (Prime Video / AV Squad); The Wheel of Time: "Season 3: Heroes" (Amazon MGM Studios / Wild Card Creative Group)
Best Foreign (Trailer/Teaser) for a TV/Streaming Series	Best Graphics (Trailer/Teaser) for a TV/Streaming Series
The Sticky: "Heist" (Amazon MGM Studios / Screenland Creative); Citadel: Honey Bunny: "Together" (Prime Video / AV Squad); Squid Game: "Season 2 Teaser: No Stopping the Game" (Netflix / RAVE Collective); Toxic Town: "Voices" (Netflix UK / Trailer Park Group); When No One Sees Us: "Official Trailer" (HBO MAX / Intermission Film)	The Lord of the Rings: The Rings of Power: "Season 2" (Prime / BOND); Beast Games: "Betrayal" (Amazon MGM Studios / Tiny Hero); Beast Games: "Countdown" (Amazon MGM Studios / Tiny Hero); Motion Graphics (Prime / Bond); Number One on the Call Sheet: "Pulse" (Apple TV+ / GrandSon); To Be Hero X: "Official Trailer #3" (Crunchyroll, Aniplex, Bilibili, BeDream)
Best Horror/Thriller (Trailer/Teaser) for a TV/Streaming Series	Best Music (Trailer/Teaser) for a TV/Streaming Series
Severance: "S2 Welcome Back" (Apple TV+ / Wild Card Creative Group); Presumed Innocent: "I Did Not Kill Her" (Apple TV+ / AV Squad); Teacup: "Hide" (Peacock / Trailer Park Group); The Last of Us: "Season 2 Teaser: Saved" (HBO / Level Up AV); The Walking Dead: Dead City: "Season 2" (AMC Networks / Intermission Film)	Severance: "Season 2 RTO Teaser" (Apple TV+ / Transit); American Horror Stories: "Huluween 2024 Official Trailer" (FX, Hulu / Hulu); Eric: "Lost" (Netflix / Create Advertising London); The Day of the Jackal: "U.S. Trailer" (Peacock & Carnival Films / X/AV); The Last of Us: "Season 2 Teaser: Saved" (HBO / Level Up AV)
Best Original Score (Trailer/Teaser) for a TV/Streaming Series	Best Sound Editing (Trailer/Teaser) for a TV/Streaming Series
The Madness: "Escape" (Netflix / Mocean); Agatha All Along: "The Road" (Disney+ / Level Up AV); Blood of Zeus: "Season 2" (Netflix / Netflix Creative Studio); The Narrow Road to the Deep North: "Spirit" (Amazon / Ignition Creative)	Senna: "Forever" (Netflix / GrandSon); Black Mirror: "Season 7 – Official Trailer" (Netflix / Zealot); The Last of Us: "Season 2 Teaser: Saved" (HBO / Level Up AV); The Secret World of Sound (Netflix / Netflix Creative Studio); Your Friends & Neighbors: "Petty Crime" (Apple TV+ / Tiny Hero)
Best Voice Over (Trailer/Teaser) for a TV/Streaming Series	Most Original (Trailer/Teaser) for a TV/Streaming Series
A Real Bug's Life (National Geographic / Ultrabland); Erased: WW2's Hidden Heroes (National Geographic / Zealot); Percy Jackson and the Olympians: "Start of Production: Chariot Tease" (Disney Branded Television)	Severance: "Season 2 RTO Teaser" (Apple TV+ / Transit); Black Mirror: "Season 7 – Official Trailer" (Netflix / Zealot); Government Cheese: "Fresh Start" (Apple TV+ / Tiny Hero); Teacup: "Damned Fine China" (Peacock / Big Picture Entertainment); The Last of Us: "Season 2 Teaser: Saved" (HBO / Level Up AV)
Best OTO (One Time Only) Special	Best Promo for a TV Network
Presenting the 2025 Best Picture Nominees (Academy of Motion Picture Arts and Sciences / REBEL); Merry Matrix (TV Globo Poomo / TV Globo); Netflix Geeked Week 2024: "The Other Side" (Netflix / Tiny Hero); Shark Week 2024: "In the Summertime" (WB Discovery / AV Squad); The Gift of Music (The Walt Disney Company / TWDC Creative)	ATV+: "Alive Cutdown" (Apple TV+ / Create Advertising Group); Apple TV+ Summer Preview 2025: "Quality Time" (Apple TV+ / AV Squad); FX Has the Movies 2025: "Insane TV Spot" (FX / Zealot); Huluween: "Crazy" (Hulu); Netflix is Blowing Up (Netflix / Create Advertising Group)
Best Action (TV Spot) for a TV/Streaming Series	Best Animation/Family (TV Spot) for a TV/Streaming Series
Arcane: "S2: Reckoning" (Netflix / Tiny Hero); The Last of Us: "Season" (HBO / Create Advertising Group); Reacher: "Season 3: Plan" (Amazon Prime Video / Zealot); The Killer: "Fly" (Universal Pictures / Inside Job)	The Fairly Odd Parents: A Whole New World (Netflix / Netflix Creative Studio); Agatha All Along: "Damage" (Disney+ / Level Up AV); Tomb Raider: The Legend of Lara Croft: "Date Announce" (Netflix / Tiny Hero); Your Friendly Neighborhood Spider-Man: "All Streaming" (Walt Disney Studios / Requiem)
Best Comedy (TV Spot) for a TV/Streaming Series	Best Documentary (TV Spot) for a TV/Streaming Series
The Studio: "Thank You" (Apple TV+ / Wild Card Creative Group); Abbott Elementary/It's Always Sunny in Philadelphia: "Crossover Pepe Silvia Promo" (ABC); Deli Boys: "In Charge" (Hulu / Onyx / Wild Card Creative Group); Only Murders in the Building: "S4 Movie" (Hulu / Create Advertising Group); The White Lotus: "Season 3 Desire" (HBO / Create Advertising Group)	David Blaine: Do Not Attempt (National Geographic / Ultrabland); American Idol: "Dreams" (ABC / Silk Factory); Temptation Island: "Season 1" (Netflix / Netflix Creative Studio); Tsunami: Race Against Time: "Babadook" (National Geographic / Aspect); Wayne Brady: The Family Remix: "Core 4" (Freeform)
Best Drama (TV Spot) for a TV/Streaming Series	Best Horror/Thriller (TV Spot) for a TV/Streaming Series
Shōgun: "Outstanding" (Disney+ / Ignition Creative London); Black Doves: "Christmas" (Netflix / Make it Social); Disclaimer: "Develop" (Apple TV+ / Mark Woollen & Associates); The Last of Us: "Event/Sell" (HBO / Create Advertising Group); The Penguin: "TV60: Hype" (HBO / Bond)	Squid Game: "Season 2: Phenomenon" (Netflix / Trailer Park Group); Cross: "Season 1: Facing Death" (Amazon MGM Studios / X/AV); Dark Winds: "Teaser: The Line" (AMC / Bond); Severance: "S2 Return" (Apple TV+ / Wild Card Creative Group); The Devil's Climb: "Halloween" (National Geographic / National Geographic)
Best Music (TV Spot) for a TV/Streaming Series	Most Original (TV Spot) for a TV/Streaming Series
Arcane: "S2: Reckoning" (Netflix / Tiny Hero); 9-1-1: "Beenado - In the Air" (ABC); Anthracite: "What Is Love?" (Netflix / Netflix Creative Studio); Hulu on Disney+: "Let's Get It On" (Hulu); Tracker: "Superbowl Spot – Alive" (CBS / Arkive Creative)	Fallout: "Wasteland Review" (Amazon MGM Studios / Aspect); Abbott Elementary: "Season 4 Premiere Dio-Drama" (ABC); Arcane: "S2: Reckoning" (Netflix / Tiny Hero); Hulu on Disney+: "Roll Call" (Hulu / Zealot); Paradise: "Revelation" (Hulu / Bond)

Digital & Innovation

Best Digital – Action	Best Digital – Animation/Family
Daredevil: Born Again: "Seeing Red" (Disney+ / Create Advertising Group); Deadpool & Wolverine: "The Whole Package" (Walt Disney Studios / Tiny Hero); Deadpool & Wolverine: "Holy Chimichanga" (Walt Disney Studios / Aspect); Furiosa: A Mad Max Saga: "Witness" (Warner Bros. / REBEL); The Fall Guy: "Stunt Guy" (Universal / REBEL)	Inside Out 2: "Get Ready" (The Walt Disney Studios / Tiny Hero); Despicable Me 4: "Announce Trailer: New Home" (Universal / REBEL); Kung Fu Panda 4: "Good Skadoosh" (Universal Pictures Home Entertainment / Paradise Creative LLC); A Minecraft Movie: "Be Mine Digital" (Warner Bros. / Buddha Jones); The Wild Robot: "Organic Social/Meet the Cast 1/4×5" (Universal Pictures / Inside Job)
Best Digital – Comedy	Best Digital – Drama
Deadpool & Wolverine: "Dawn of Popcorn" (Walt Disney Studios / Mocean); Beetlejuice Beetlejuice: "Movie Night" (Warner Bros. / REBEL); Deadpool & Wolverine: "Fancam" (IMAX / Make It Social); Shaun of the Dead: "20th Anniversary: Judgement Day" (Universal Pictures Home Entertainment / Paradise Creative); The Instigators: "How to Rob the Mayor" (Apple TV+ / AV Squad)	Out of My Mind: "Beautiful" (Disney Branded Television); A Complete Unknown: "Newport" (Searchlight Pictures / GrandSon); Silo: "360" (Apple TV+ / Create Advertising Group); The Bikeriders: "Announce Trailer: Crash" (Universal / Rebel); The Seed of the Sacred Fig: "Bullets" (Lionsgate / Silk Factory)
Best Digital – Fantasy Adventure	Best Digital – Horror/Thriller
Kingdom of the Planet of the Apes: "Apes Home" (Disney / Rebel); Furiosa: A Mad Max Saga: "Unhinged Bonus" (Warner Bros. / Rebel); Ghostbusters: Frozen Empire: "Retro Titles" (Sony Pictures Entertainment / Silk Factory); The Mandalorian: "Yes" (The Walt Disney Studios / AV Squad); Wicked: "Masterpiece/Academy Nominations" (Universal Pictures / Inside Job)	Severance: "Season 2 Digital Campaign" (Apple TV+ / Leroy & Rose); 28 Years Later: "Digital Teaser" (Sony / Buddha Jones); Afraid: "Pay Attention" (Sony Pictures / AV Squad); Sinners: "Happy New Year" (Warner Bros. Pictures / AV Squad); The Monkey: "Instruments" (Neon / AV Squad)
Most Innovative Advertising for a Feature Film	Best Action/Thriller TrailerByte for a Feature Film
Wicked: "Poetry in Emotion" (Universal Pictures / Inside Job); A Complete Unknown: "Homesick Blues" (Searchlight Pictures / Wild Card Creative Group); Deadpool & Wolverine: "Fandango" (Walt Disney Studios / Tiny Hero); Furiosa: A Mad Max Saga: "Big Screen" (Warner Bros. Pictures / AV Squad); Wicked: "Do Us Good" (Universal / SunnyBoy Entertainment)	Twisters: "Tornado Alarm" (Warner Bros. Discovery / Tiny Hero); Deadpool & Wolverine: "Bye Bye Bye" (The Walt Disney Studios / Tiny Hero); Gladiator II: "Live, Die, Reign" (Paramount+ / Stampede Studios); Kingdom of the Planet of the Apes: "Bring Apes Home" (Disney / Rebel); Warfare: "Sensitive Content" (A24 / AV Squad)
Best Animation TrailerByte for a Feature Film	Best Comedy/Drama TrailerByte for a Feature Film
Your Friendly Neighborhood Spider-Man: "Protect" (Disney+ / Create Advertising Group); Memoir of a Snail: "Meet Pinky" (IFC Films / Intermission Film); Paddington in Peru: "Do See" (Sony / Ignition Creative); Sonic the Hedgehog 3: "London Tips" (Paramount / Create Advertising Group); Wicked: "Talent Goldblum" (Universal / Rebel)	A Minecraft Movie: "You Died" (Warner Bros. / AV Squad); A Complete Unknown: "Timmy is Bob" (Searchlight Pictures / Tiny Hero); Deadpool & Wolverine: "Unleashed" (Marvel Studios / Ignition Creative); Deadpool & Wolverine: "Fancam" (IMAX / Make It Social); Mickey 17: "Terms and Agreements" (Warner Bros. / Tiny Hero)
Best Horror/Thriller TrailerByte for a Feature Film	Best Viral Campaign for a Feature Film
The Monkey: "Terrify" (Black Bear / Ignition Creative London); Longlegs: "Let Him In" (Black Bear / Ignition Creative London); Nosferatu: "One by One" (Focus Features / GrandSon); Sinners: "Dark Mode" (Warner Bros. Pictures / AV Squad); The Watchers: "Night Flashes" (Warner Bros. Discovery / Tiny Hero)	Wicked: "Campaign" (Universal / Rebel); Challengers: "Digital Campaign" (Amazon MGM Studio / Watson Design Group); Mickey 17: "Digital Campaign" (Warner Bros. / Tiny Hero); Nosferatu: "TV Campaign" (Focus Features / Bond); Twisters: "Digital Campaign" (Warner Bros. Discovery / Tiny Hero)
Most Innovative Advertising for a TV/Streaming Series	Best Action/Thriller TrailerByte for a TV/Streaming Series
Black Mirror: "Nubbin Entertainment – 30 Spot" (Netflix / Zealot); Abbott Elementary: "A.V.A. Fest at San Diego Comic-Con 2024" (ABC); Squid Game: "S2 Date Announcement" (Netflix / Trailer Park Group); The Day of the Jackal: "Times Square Digital Spectacular" (Peacock / The Refinery); The Gentlemen: "ABCs" (Netflix / Make it Social)	Fallout: "Doom Scrolling" (Prime Video / Ignition Creative London); Arcane: "S2: Showdown Parallax" (Netflix / Tiny Hero); Silo: "Rebellion" (Apple TV+ / Create Advertising); Star Wars: Skeleton Crew: "Blast from the Past" (Disney / Intermission Film); What If...?: "Agatha Goes to Hollywood" (The Walt Disney Studios / Tiny Hero)
Best Comedy/Drama TrailerByte for a TV/Streaming Series	Best Viral Campaign for a TV/Streaming Series
The Greatest Hits: "Spotify Playlist" (Searchlight Pictures / Tiny Hero); Agatha All Along: "Gather Your Coven" (Walt Disney Studios / Tiny Hero); Agatha All Along: "POV You're a 350 Year Old Witch" (Disney / Intermission Film); The Gentlemen: "ABCs" (Netflix / Make it Social); The Simpsons: "O C'Mon All Ye Faithful, 35 Years in the Making" (Disney / Intermission Film)	Only Murders in the Building: "Season 4 Social Teaser Campaign" (Hulu Originals); David Blaine: Do Not Attempt (National Geographic / Ignition); Under the Bridge: "Social Teaser Campaign" (Hulu Originals); What If...?: "Digital Campaign" (The Walt Disney Studios / Tiny Hero)
Best BTS/EPK for a Feature Film (Under 2 minutes)	Best BTS/EPK for a Feature Film (Over 2 minutes)
Fly Me to the Moon: "Lance Vespertine Explains It All" (Apple TV+ / Rubber Sole Creative); A Complete Unknown: "Spirit EPK" (Searchlight Pictures / GrandSon); Joker: Folie à Deux: "What The World Needs Now" (Warner Brothers Discovery / SunnyBoy Entertainment); Mickey 17: "Visionary Storytelling" (Warner Bros. / Narrator Inc.); Wicked: "A Week On Set With Ariana" (Universal Studios / The Workhouse Picture Company Ltd.)	F1: "BTS" (Warner Bros. / Wild Card Creative Group); Emilia Pérez: "30min Making of Special" (Netflix / Big Picture Entertainment); How to Train Your Dragon: "First Look" (DreamWorks / Narrator Inc.); Out of My Mind: "Premise Featurette" (Disney Branded Television / Disney Branded Television In-House Team); Wicked: "A Passion Project" (Universal Studios / The Workhouse Picture Company Ltd.)
Best BTS/EPK for a TV/Streaming Series (Under 2 minutes)	Best BTS/EPK for a TV/Streaming Series (Over 2 minutes)
Slow Horses: "Who Meets Their Demise in Season 4?" (Apple TV+ / Intermission Film); A Thousand Blows: "The Forty Elephants" (Disney+ UK / Trailer Park Group); Agatha All Along: "Practical Magic" (Walt Disney Studios / Tiny Hero); Silo: "Behind Rebecca Ferguson's Character Tattoos" (Apple / The Workhouse Picture Company Ltd); The Lord of the Rings: The Rings of Power: "On Set With Morfydd and Charlie" (Prime Video / SunnyBoy Entertainment)	The Penguin: "Becoming The Penguin" (HBO / Marketing AV); Say Nothing: "Inside the Silence: A First Look at Say Nothing" (FX / FX, Intermission Film); American Primeval: "The Making of American Primeval" (Netflix / Lussier); The Righteous Gemstones: "Baby Billy Faith Tonight Profile" (HBO / Andrew Epstein); The Lord of the Rings: The Rings of Power: "A Look Inside Season 2" (Prime Video / SunnyBoy Entertainment)

Poster

Best Action Poster	Best Animation/Family Poster
The Crow: "Murder of Crows Poster" (Lionsgate / AV Print); Mickey 17: "Payoff Poster" (Warner Bros. / Mocean); Thunderbolts* (City Ensemble, Disney Studios Domestic / The Refinery); Tornado (Lionsgate / Intermission Film)	Moana 2: "D23 Specialty Poster" (Walt Disney Studios Creative Advertising / Leroy & Rose); Haikyu!! The Dumpster Battle: "Poster" (Crunchyroll, Sony Pictures Entertainment, Toho, Production I.G); Piece by Piece: "Burst Art Poster" (Focus Features / AV Print); The Wild Robot: "Payoff Poster" (Universal Pictures / AV Print & DreamWorks Animation)
Best Billboard (for Feature Film or TV/Streaming Series)	Best Comedy Poster
Abbott Elementary: "Season 4 Diorama Billboard" (ABC); Goosebumps: The Vanishing: "Billboard" (Disney Branded Television); A Minecraft Movie: "Minecraft Billboard" (Warner Bros. / WORKS ADV); Squid Game: "Season 3: The Drag Flowers" (Netflix / The Refinery)	A Real Pain (Searchlight / Intermission Film); Death of a Unicorn: "Face-Off Poster" (A24 / AV Print); Mickey 17: "4DX Poster" (Warner Bros. / AV Print); Successor (Mao Yan Entertainment / Ackue Studio)
Best Documentary Poster	Best Drama Poster
Jim Henson Idea Man: "Key Art" (Disney Branded Television); Hip Hop and the White House: "Main Key Art" (Andscape/Hulu, Art Machine London, A Trailer Park Group Company); The Unicycling Unicorn (Odd Creative Direction / Rab Media); We The North: "Historic" (Uninterrupted Canada / Champ & Pepper)	Back to Black: "Watercolor Poster" (Focus Features / AV Print); Catching Dust (Mark David Production / The Posterhouse); Downton Abbey: The Grand Finale: "Teaser Poster" (Focus Features / AV Print); His Three Daughters: "Illustration" (Netflix / GrandSon)
Best Foreign Poster	Best Horror Poster
The Poet (Central Partnership, Kinoslovo / Good Thursday); Kill the Jockey (Infinity Hill / Fable); The Room Next Door: "French Poster" (Pathe / Leroy & Rose); The Unseen Sister: "Key Art" (Linmon Pictures / Zealot)	Azrael: "Payoff Poster" (IFC Films / Mocean); Sinners: "IMAX Poster" (Warner Bros. / AV Print); Sting: "Hero Key Art" (WellGo USA Entertainment / The Refinery); The Monkey: "Teaser Art" (Neon / GrandSon)
Best Independent Poster	Best International Poster
Killer of Men: "In His Head" (Quiver Distribution / Champ & Pepper); Notice to Quit: "Quad Poster" (Whiskey Creek / Fable); Sew Torn (The Playmaker Munich / Good Hands); Skincare: "Teaser Art" (IFC / GrandSon)	The Monkey (Black Bear / Ignition Creative London); Kneecap (Wildcard Distribution / Coffee & Cigarettes); Sinners: "International Poster" (Warner Bros. / AV Print); The Wild Robot: "International Payoff Poster" (Universal Pictures / AV Print & DreamWorks Animation)
Best Thriller Poster	Best Wildposts
Blink Twice: "One Sheet" (MGM Amazon / 27×40); Black Bag: "Payoff Poster" (Focus Features / AV Print); Caddo Lake: "Payoff Poster" (Max Originals / AV Print); Holland: "SXSW" (Amazon / GrandSon)	The First Omen: "Woman, Baby, Satan" (Disney Home Entertainment / The Refinery); Dog Man: "Payoff Wildpostings" (Universal Pictures, AV Print & DreamWorks Animation); Notice to Quit: "Wildposts" (Whiskey Creek / Fable); Thunderbolts*: "This is a Bolt Series" (Disney Studios Domestic / The Refinery)
Most Original Poster	Best Motion Poster
Sinners: "Fortnite Poster" (Warner Bros. / AV Print); Kill the Jockey (Infinity Hill / Fable); Sew Torn (The Playmaker Munich / Good Hands); The End: "Tilda Swinton" (Neon / GrandSon)	Inside Out 2 (The Walt Disney Studios / Tiny Hero); Ash: "Lightbar Motion Poster" (IFC / GrandSon); Captain America: Brave New World: "Forward" (The Walt Disney Studios / Tiny Hero); The First Omen: "666" (Disney Home Entertainment / The Refinery)
Best Comedy Poster for a TV/Streaming Series	Best Documentary/Reality Poster for a TV/Streaming Series
The Studio (Apple TV+ / GrandSon); Baby Reindeer: "Pub Sign" (Netflix / Netflix Creative Studio); Only Murders in the Building: "S4 Key Art" (Hulu / The Refinery); What We Do in the Shadows: "Payoff Poster" (FX Networks / Mocean)	Formula 1: Drive to Survive (Netflix / Intermission Film); Leonardo da Vinci: "Key Art" (PBS / SJI Associates); Mammals (BBC Studios Creative, BBC Studios, BBC America, ZDF & France Télévisions for BBC); Vietnam: The War That Changed America: "Collage Poster" (Apple TV+ / AV Print)
Best Drama/Action Poster for a TV/Streaming Series	Best Horror/Thriller Poster for a TV/Streaming Series
The Last of Us: "Season 2 Teaser" (Max Originals Marketing / BLT Communications); 1923: "Season 2 Key Art" (Paramount+ / Leroy & Rose); Kaos (Netflix / Intermission Film); La Maison: "Payoff Poster" (Apple TV+ / AV Print)	Squid Game: "Season 2: Stair Maze Vertical" (Netflix / The Refinery); Dark Matter: "Payoff Poster" (Apple TV+ / AV Print); From: "Hero Art" (MGM+ / The Refinery); Goosebumps: The Vanishing: "Key Art" (Disney Branded Television)
Best Teaser Poster	Best WildPosts for a TV/Streaming Series
Death of a Unicorn: "Teaser Poster" (A24 / AV Print); Megalopolis: "Teaser Poster" (Lionsgate / Mocean); Superman: "Teaser" (Warner Bros. / Works ADV); Thunderbolts*: "Teaser Art" (Disney Studios Domestic / The Refinery)	Only Murders in the Building: "S4 Character Banners" (Hulu / The Refinery); FX Emmy Campaign (FX Networks / Mocean); Squid Game: "Season 2: Character Banners" (Netflix / The Refinery); The Last of Us: "Season 2: Teaser Wildposts" (HBO / AV Print)
