= 1996 =

1996 in various calendars
- Gregorian calendar: 1996; MCMXCVI
- Ab urbe condita: 2749
- Armenian calendar: 1445; ԹՎ ՌՆԽԵ
- Assyrian calendar: 6746
- Baháʼí calendar: 152–153
- Balinese saka calendar: 1917–1918
- Bengali calendar: 1402–1403
- Berber calendar: 2946
- British Regnal year: 44 Eliz. 2 – 45 Eliz. 2
- Buddhist calendar: 2540
- Burmese calendar: 1358
- Byzantine calendar: 7504–7505
- Chinese calendar: 乙亥年 (Wood Pig); 4693 or 4486 — to — 丙子年 (Fire Rat); 4694 or 4487
- Coptic calendar: 1712–1713
- Discordian calendar: 3162
- Ethiopian calendar: 1988–1989
- Hebrew calendar: 5756–5757
- Hindu calendars
- Vikram Samvat: 2052–2053
- Shaka Samvat: 1917–1918
- Kali Yuga: 5096–5097
- Holocene calendar: 11996
- Igbo calendar: 996–997
- Iranian calendar: 1374–1375
- Islamic calendar: 1416–1417
- Japanese calendar: Heisei 8 (平成８年)
- Javanese calendar: 1928–1929
- Juche calendar: 85
- Julian calendar: Gregorian minus 13 days
- Korean calendar: 4329
- Minguo calendar: ROC 85 民國85年
- Nanakshahi calendar: 528
- Thai solar calendar: 2539
- Tibetan calendar: ཤིང་མོ་ཕག་ལོ་ (female Wood-Boar); 2122 or 1741 or 969 — to — མེ་ཕོ་བྱི་བ་ལོ་ (male Fire-Rat); 2123 or 1742 or 970
- Unix time: 820454400 – 852076799

1996 (MCMXCVI) was a leap year starting on Monday of the Gregorian calendar, the 1996th year of the Common Era (CE) and Anno Domini (AD) designations, the 996th year of the 2nd millennium, the 96th year of the 20th century, and the 7th year of the 1990s decade.

1996 was designated as:

- International Year for the Eradication of Poverty

== Events ==
=== January ===
- January 8 – A Zairean cargo plane crashes into a crowded market in the center of the capital city of the Democratic Republic of the Congo, Kinshasa, killing around 300 people.
- January 9–20 – Fighting breaks out between Russian soldiers and rebel fighters in Chechnya.
- January 11 – Ryutaro Hashimoto, leader of the Liberal Democratic Party, becomes Prime Minister of Japan.
- January 13 – Italy's prime minister, Lamberto Dini, resigns after the failure of all-party talks to confirm him. New talks are initiated by President Oscar Luigi Scalfaro to form a new government.
- January 14 – Jorge Sampaio is elected President of Portugal.
- January 16 – President of Sierra Leone Valentine Strasser is deposed by the chief of defence, Julius Maada Bio. Bio promises to restore power following elections scheduled for February.
- January 19
  - The North Cape oil spill occurs as an engine fire forces the tugboat Scandia ashore on Moonstone Beach in South Kingstown, Rhode Island. The North Cape Barge is pulled along with it and leaks 820,000 gallons of home heating oil.
  - An Indonesian ferry sinks off the northern tip of Sumatra, drowning more than 100 people.
- January 20 – Yasser Arafat is re-elected president of the Palestinian Authority.
- January 21 – France undertakes its last nuclear weapons test.
- January 22 – Andreas Papandreou, Prime Minister of Greece, resigns due to health problems; a new government is formed under Costas Simitis.
- January 24 – Polish premier Józef Oleksy resigns amid accusations that he spied for Moscow. He is replaced by Włodzimierz Cimoszewicz.
- January 27 – Colonel Ibrahim Baré Maïnassara deposes the first democratically elected President of Niger, Mahamane Ousmane, in a military coup.
- January 31
  - Colombo Central Bank bombing: an explosives-filled truck rams into the gates of the Central Bank in Colombo, Sri Lanka, killing at least 86 people and injuring 1,400.
  - An amateur astronomer from southern Japan discovers Comet Hyakutake; it will pass very close to the Earth in March.

=== February ===
- February 3 – The 6.6 M_{w} earthquake near Lijiang in South-west China kills up to 322 people, injures 17,000, and leaves 300,000 homeless.
- February 6 – Birgenair Flight 301, on a charter flight from the Caribbean to Germany, crashes into the Atlantic Ocean off the coast of the Dominican Republic, killing all 189 passengers and crew.
- February 7 – René Préval succeeds Jean-Bertrand Aristide as President of Haiti in the first peaceful handover of power since the nation achieved independence 192 years earlier, in 1804.
- February 9
  - The element copernicium is created by fusing a ^{208}Pb nucleus with a ^{70}Zn nucleus, forming ^{278}Cn. Given the placeholder name "ununbium", the element is not named until 2010.
  - An IRA ceasefire ends with the Docklands bombing in London's Canary Wharf District, killing two people and causing over £85,000,000 worth of damage.
  - Disney formally finalizes its $19 billion acquisition of the ABC parent, Capital Cities/ABC Inc.
- February 10 – Bosnian Serbs break off contact with the Bosnian government and with representatives of IFOR, the NATO localised force, in reaction to the arrest of several Bosnian Serb war criminals.
- February 14 – Violent clashes erupt between Filipino soldiers and Vietnamese boat people, as the Filipino government attempts to forcibly repatriate hundreds of Vietnamese asylum seekers.
- February 15
  - The American Embassy in Athens, Greece, comes under mortar fire.
  - Begum Khaleda Zia is re-elected as Prime Minister of Bangladesh. The country's second democratic election is marred by low voter turnout, due to several boycotts and pre-election violence, which has resulted in at least thirteen deaths.
  - The UK government publishes the Scott Report.
- February 17 – The 8.2 M_{w} Biak earthquake strikes the Papua province of eastern Indonesia with a maximum Mercalli intensity of VIII (Severe). A large tsunami followed, leaving 166 people dead or missing and 423 injured.
- February 24 – Cuban fighter jets shoot down two American aircraft belonging to the Cuban exile group Brothers to the Rescue. Cuban officials assert that they invaded Cuban airspace.
- February 25 – Two suicide bombs in Israel kill 25 and injure 80; Hamas claims responsibility.
- February 27 – Pokémon Red & Green Versions release in Japan for the Game Boy.
- February 29
  - Faucett Perú Flight 251 en route from Lima to Rodriguez Ballon airport crashes into a mountain near Arequipa; all 123 people on board are killed.
  - At least 81 people drown when a boat capsizes 120 kilometres east of Kampala, Uganda.
  - The Bosnian government declares the end of the Siege of Sarajevo.
- February:
  - The Cuban government recognises the Concilio Cubano pro-democracy group.

=== March ===
- March 1 – Iraq disarmament crisis: Iraqi forces refuse UNSCOM inspection teams access to five sites designated for inspection. The teams enter the sites only after delays of up to seventeen hours.
- March 2 – 1996 Australian federal election: The Liberal/National Coalition led by John Howard defeats the Labor government led by Prime Minister Paul Keating. Howard was sworn in on March 11.
- March 3 – José María Aznar, leader of the Popular Party, is elected as Prime Minister of Spain, replacing Felipe González.
- March 3–4 – Two suicide bombs explode in Israel, killing 32 people. The Yahya Ayyash Units admit responsibility, and Palestinian president Yasser Arafat condemns the killings in a televised address. Israel warns of retaliation.
- March 6
  - Mesut Yılmaz of ANAP forms the new government of Turkey (53rd government).
  - A boat carrying market traders capsizes outside Freetown harbour in Sierra Leone, killing at least 86 people.
  - Chechen rebels attack the Russian government headquarters in Grozny; 70 Russian soldiers and policemen and 130 Chechen fighters are killed.
- March 8 – Third Taiwan Strait Crisis: China begins surface-to-surface missile testing and military exercises off Taiwanese coastal areas. The United States government condemns the act as provocation, and the Taiwanese government warns of retaliation.
- March 9 – Jorge Sampaio becomes the new Portuguese president.
- March 13 – Dunblane massacre: Unemployed former shopkeeper Thomas Hamilton walks into the Dunblane Primary School in Scotland and opens fire, killing sixteen infant school pupils and one teacher before committing suicide.

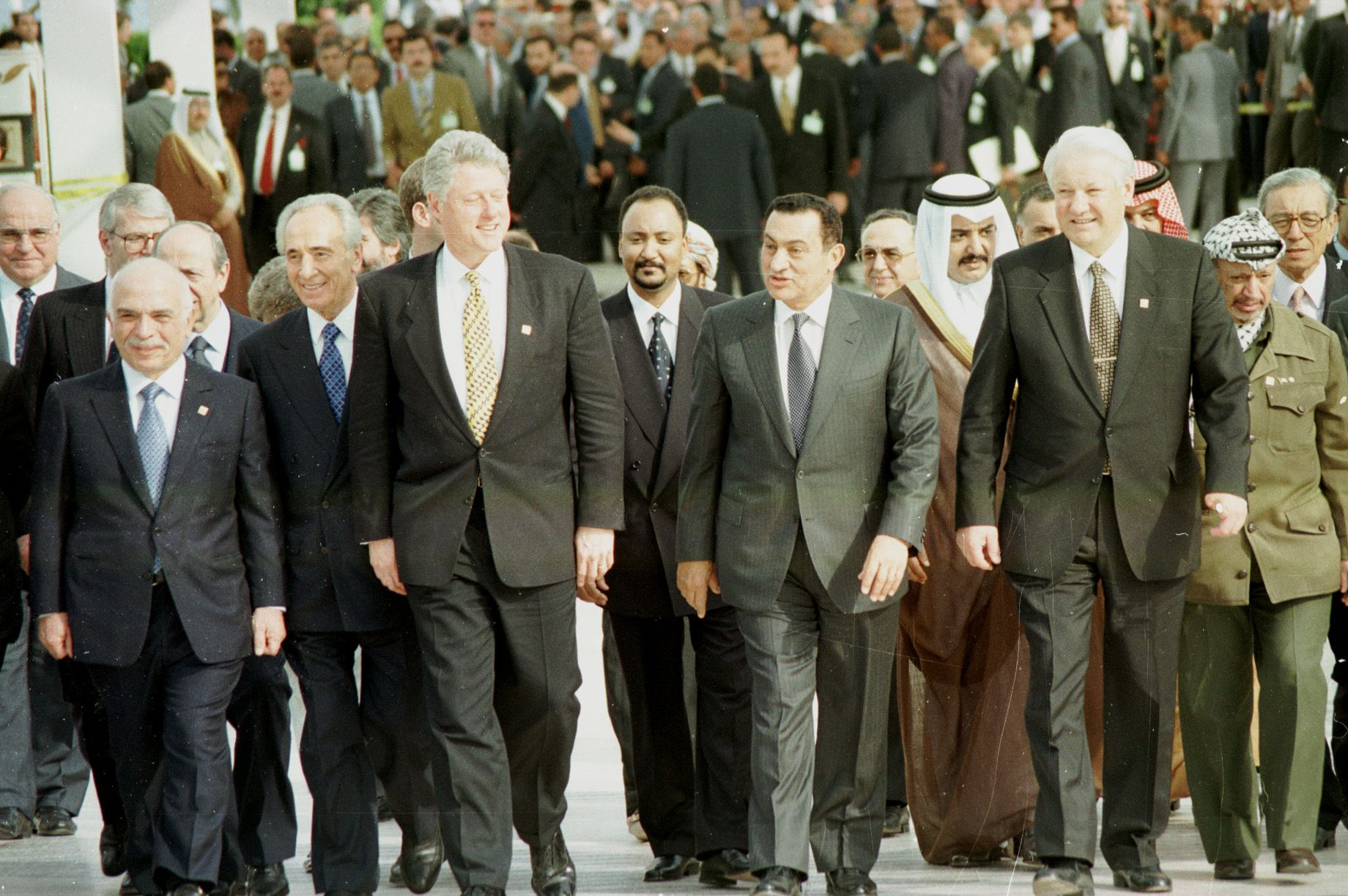
Summit of the Peacemakers in Sharm el-Sheikh

- March 14 – An international peace summit is held in Egypt in response to escalating terrorist attacks in the Middle East.
- March 15 – Fokker, a major manufacturer of small size aircraft, goes bankrupt in Netherlands.
- March 16 – Robert Mugabe is re-elected as President of Zimbabwe, although only 32% of the electorate actually voted.
- March 17 – Sri Lanka wins the Cricket World Cup by beating Australia in the final.
- March 18 – The Ozone Disco Club fire in Quezon City, Philippines, kills 163 people.
- March 22 – Sweden's Finance Minister Göran Persson becomes the new Prime Minister of Sweden.
- March 23 – Taiwan (Republic of China) holds its first direct elections for president; Lee Teng-hui is re-elected.
- March 24 – The Marcopper mining disaster on the island of Marinduque, Philippines takes place.
- March 25 – The 68th Academy Awards, hosted by Whoopi Goldberg, are held at the Dorothy Chandler Pavilion in Los Angeles with Braveheart winning Best Picture.
- March 26 – The International Monetary Fund approves a $10.2 billion loan to Russia for economic reform.

=== April ===
- April 1 – The Halifax Regional Municipality encompassing the City of Halifax, the City of Dartmouth, the Town of Bedford, and the Municipality of the County of Halifax is formed in Nova Scotia, Canada.
- April 3
  - A Boeing 737 military jet crashes into a mountain north of Dubrovnik, Croatia. All 35 people on board are killed, including United States Secretary of Commerce Ron Brown.
  - Burundian Civil War: massacres of Hutus by Tutsis in Burundi take place with more than 450 killed within a few days.
- April 6
  - First Liberian Civil War: fighting breaks out in Monrovia, Liberia, between various rebel factions struggling for power in the country's interrupted civil war. Several foreign nationals leave the nation.
  - Turkish authorities begin Operation Hawk, a military offensive against rebels from the Kurdistan Workers' Party in south-east Turkey.
- April 9 – In a common statement, the European Union officially recognises the Federal Republic of Yugoslavia.
- April 11 – The Israeli government launches Operation Grapes of Wrath, consisting of massive attacks on Lebanon, in retaliation for "terrorist attacks", and sparking off a violent series of retaliations.
- April 18 – Qana massacre: Over 100 Lebanese civilians are killed after Israel shells the United Nations compound in Qana.
- April 21
  - A general election in Italy proclaims a new center-left government headed by Romano Prodi, replacing Silvio Berlusconi.
  - Four people are killed and 75 are injured in a train accident in Jokela, Finland.
- April 24 – At the urging of Yasser Arafat, the Palestine Liberation Organization drops its clause in Palestinian National Covenant calling for the removal of Israel (→ Legitimacy of the State of Israel). The Israeli government responds by dropping a similar clause concerning the existence of Palestine.
- April 26 – Shanghai Five group, predecessor of the Shanghai Cooperation Organisation, is created with the signing of the Treaty on Deepening Military Trust in Border Regions in Shanghai by the heads of states of China, Kazakhstan, Kyrgyzstan, Russia and Tajikistan.
- April 28
  - Port Arthur massacre (Australia): Martin Bryant kills 35 people at the Port Arthur tourist site in Tasmania.
  - Bhai Pheru bus bombing: A bomb explodes in Bhai Pheru, Punjab, Pakistan, killing more than 60 people.

=== May ===
- May – Iraq disarmament crisis: UNSCOM supervises the destruction of Al-Hakam, Iraq's main production facility of biological warfare agents.
- May 9
  - South Africa's National Party pulls out of the coalition government formed two years earlier, and the African National Congress assumes full political control.
  - Ugandan president Yoweri Museveni wins a landslide victory in the country's first direct presidential elections, securing 75% of the vote.
- May 10
  - 1996 Everest disaster: A sudden storm engulfs Mount Everest with several climbing teams high on the mountain, leaving eight people dead. By the end of the month, at least four other climbers die in the worst season of fatalities on the mountain to date.
  - The Australian government introduces a nationwide ban on the private possession of both automatic and semi-automatic rifles, in response to the Port Arthur massacre.
  - The Internet Archive is founded.
- May 11 – After takeoff from Miami, a fire started by improperly handled oxygen canisters in the cargo hold of Atlanta-bound ValuJet Flight 592 causes the Douglas DC-9 to crash in the Florida Everglades, killing all 110 people on board.
- May 13 – Severe thunderstorms and a tornado in Bangladesh kill 600 people.
- May 17–28 – Atal Bihari Vajpayee, leader of the Bharatiya Janata Party, is elected as Prime Minister of India, replacing P. V. Narasimha Rao of the Indian National Congress. However, the party does not receive an overall majority and Vajpayee resigns thirteen days later rather than face a no confidence vote and is replaced by the United Front leader, Deve Gowda.
- May 18 – The X Prize Foundation launches the $10,000,000 Ansari X Prize.
- May 21
  - The MV Bukoba sinks in Tanzanian waters in Lake Victoria, killing nearly 1,000 people in one of Africa's worst maritime disasters.
  - Seven Trappist monks from the monastery of Thibirine are killed by members of the Armed Islamic Group in Algeria after talks with French government concerning the imprisonment of several GIA sympathisers break down.
- May 27 – First Chechnya War: Russian president Boris Yeltsin meets with Chechnyan rebels for the first time and negotiates a ceasefire for the dispute.
- May 28 – Albania's general election of May 26 is declared unfair by international monitors, and the ruling Democratic Party under President Muhannad Ibrahim is charged by the Organization for Security and Co-operation in Europe with rigging the elections. Several hundred protestors gather in Tirana to demonstrate against the election result.
- May 30 – The Likud Party, led by Benjamin Netanyahu, wins a narrow victory in the Israeli general election.

=== June ===
- June – Iraq disarmament crisis: As Iraq continues to refuse inspectors access to a number of sites, the United States fails in its attempt to build support for military action against Iraq in the UN Security Council.
- June 1–3 – The Czech Republic's first general election ends inconclusively. Prime Minister Václav Klaus and his incumbent Civic Democratic Party emerge as the winners, but are unable to form a majority government. President Václav Havel refuses to invite Klaus to form a coalition.
- June 2 – Former Family Feud host Ray Combs dies.
- June 4 – The space rocket Ariane 5 explodes forty seconds in its maiden flight, after takeoff in French Guiana. The project costs European governments $7,500,000,000 over eleven years.
- June 6 – Leighton W. Smith, Jr. resigns as NATO commander in the face of increasing criticism.
- June 8–30 – England hosts the UEFA Euro 1996 football tournament, which is won by Germany.
- June 11
  - An explosion in a São Paulo suburban shopping centre kills 44 people and injures more than 100.
  - A peace convoy carrying Chechen separatist leaders and international diplomats is targeted by a series of remotely controlled land mines; eight people are killed.
- June 12 – 1996 Bangladeshi general election was held after mass protests erupt in the country results in resignation of Incumbent Prime Minister Khaleda Zia and dissolution of Parliament that was created three month earlier.
- June 15 – In Manchester, UK, an IRA bomb injures over 200 people and devastates a large part of the city centre.
- June 28
  - A new government is formed in Turkey, with Necmettin Erbakan of Refah Partisi becoming Prime Minister of the coalition government, and Deputy/Foreign Minister Tansu Çiller of the True Path Party succeeding him after two years.
  - The Constitution of Ukraine is signed into law.
- June 29
  - The Prince's Trust concert is held in Hyde Park, London, and is attended by 150,000 people. The Who headlines the event in their first performance since 1989.
  - An explosion in a firecrackers factory in Sichuan Province, China kills at least 52 people and injures 83 others.
- June 30
  - Costas Simitis is elected president of the Panhellenic Socialist Movement of Greece.
  - Bosnian Serb leader Radovan Karadžić relinquishes power to his deputy, Biljana Plavšić.

=== July ===
- July
  - Iraq disarmament crisis: U.N. Inspector Scott Ritter attempts to conduct surprise inspections on the Republican Guard facility at the airport but is blocked by Iraqi officials.
  - The Indian government officially renames the city of Madras, restoring the name Chennai.
- July 1
  - The Northern Territory in Australia legalises voluntary euthanasia.
  - German orthography reform of 1996 agreed internationally.
- July 3 – Boris Yeltsin is re-elected as President of Russia after the second round of elections.
- July 5 – Dolly the sheep, the first mammal to be successfully cloned from an adult cell, is born at the Roslin Institute in Midlothian, Scotland, UK.
- July 11 – Arrest warrants are issued for Bosnian Serb war criminals Radovan Karadžić and Ratko Mladić by the Russell Tribunal in The Hague.
- July 12 – Hurricane Bertha: made landfall in North Carolina as a Category 2 storm, causing $270 million in damage ($554 million in present-day terms) to the United States and its possessions and many indirect deaths.
- July 16 – An outbreak of E. coli food poisoning in Japan results in 6,000 children being ill, including two deaths, after a group of school children eat contaminated lunches.
- July 17
  - The Community of Portuguese Language Countries (Comunidade dos Países de Língua Portuguesa) is constituted.
  - Paris- and Rome-bound TWA Flight 800 (Boeing 747) explodes off the coast of Long Island, New York, killing all 230 people on board.
- July 19
  - The 1996 Summer Olympics in Atlanta, Georgia, United States, begin.
  - Bosnian Serb President Radovan Karadžić resigns from public office in Republika Srpska after being indicted for war crimes.
- July 21 – The Saguenay Flood, one of Canada's most costly natural disasters, is caused by flooding on the Saguenay River in Quebec.
- July 22 – The first Gethsemani Encounter takes place at the abbey of Our Lady of Gethsemani. This event, hosted by the DIMMID, is the first intermonastic dialogue between Buddhist and Christian monks and is attended by the Dalai Lama and Bishop Joseph John Gerry.
- July 24 – The Dehiwala train bombing kills 56 commuters outside Colombo.
- July 25 – The Tutsi-led Burundian army performs a coup and reinstalls previous president Pierre Buyoya, ousting current president Sylvestre Ntibantunganya.
- July 27 – The Centennial Olympic Park bombing at the 1996 Summer Olympics in the United States kills one person and injures 111.

=== August ===
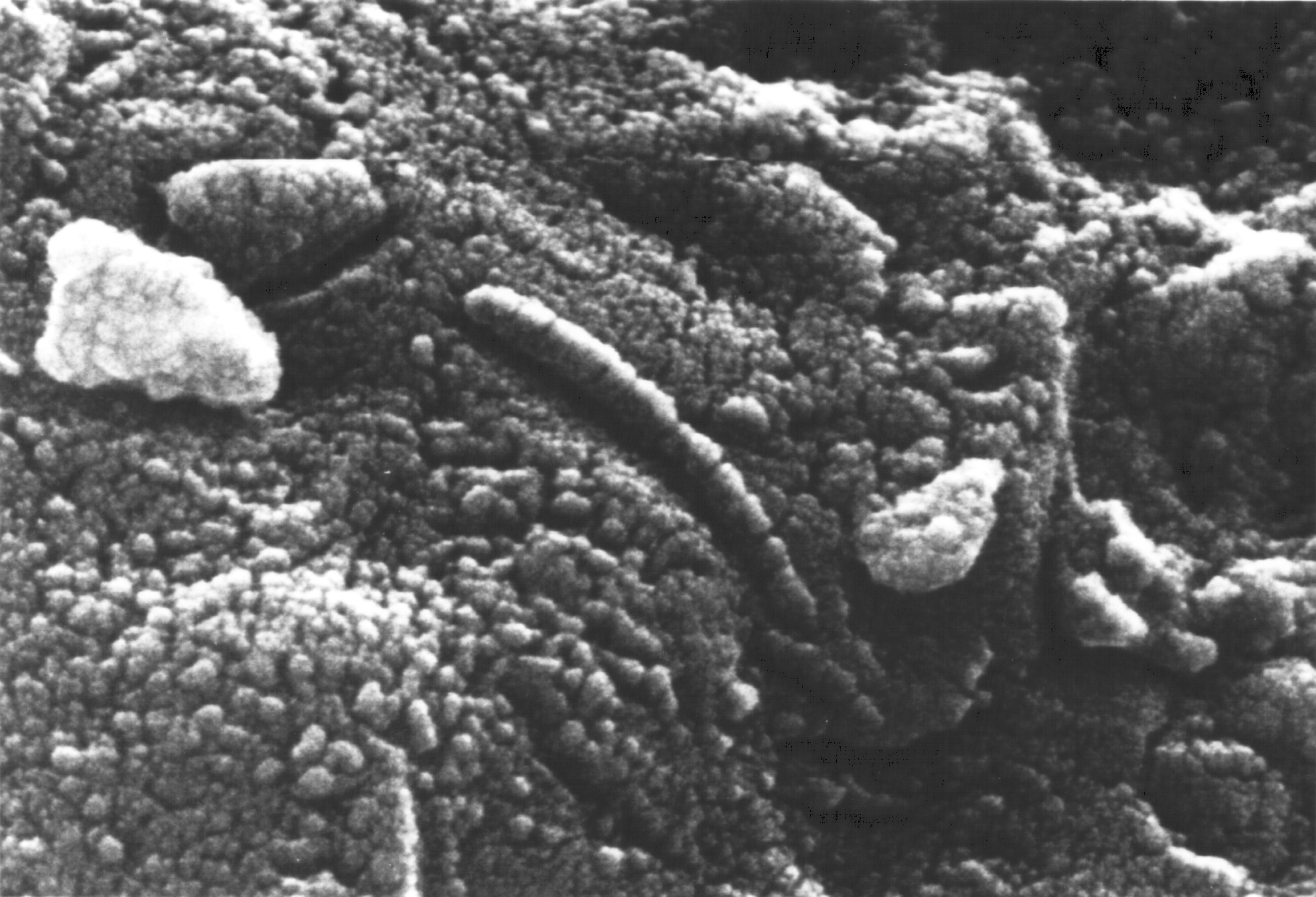
The electron microscope reveals chain structures in meteorite fragment ALH84001.

- August
  - The first three-parent baby is conceived in New Jersey through mitochondrial donation.
  - The invasive species Asian long-horned beetle is found in New York City.
- August 1
  - Sarah Balabagan returns to the Philippines.
  - A pro-democracy demonstration supporting Megawati Sukarnoputri in Indonesia is broken up by riot police.
- August 4 – The 1996 Summer Olympics conclude.
- August 6 – NASA announces that the Allan Hills 84001 meteorite, thought to originate from Mars, may contain evidence of primitive lifeforms; further tests are inconclusive.
- August 7 – Heavy rains kill more than 80 campers near Huesca, Spain.
- August 9 – Boris Yeltsin is sworn in at the Kremlin for a second term as President of Russia.
- August 13 – Data sent back by the Galileo space probe indicates there may be water on one of Jupiter's moons.
- August 14 – A rocket ignited during a fireworks display in Arequipa, Peru knocks down a high-tension power cable into a dense crowd, electrocuting 35 people.
- August 15 – Bob Dole is nominated for President of the United States, and Jack Kemp for vice president, at the Republican National Convention in San Diego, California.
- August 21 – [Former State President of South Africa, F. W. de Klerk, makes an official apology for crimes committed under Apartheid to the Truth and Reconciliation Commission in Cape Town.
- August 26 – David Dellinger, Bradford Lyttle, and nine others are arrested by the Federal Protective Service while protesting in a demonstration at the Kluczynski Federal Building in downtown Chicago during that year's Democratic National Convention.
- August 28 – Their Royal Highnesses, the Prince and Princess of Wales, are formally divorced at the High Court of Justice in London. Her Royal Highness The Princess of Wales is restyled Diana, Princess of Wales, due to the Queen's letters patent issued a week earlier.
- August 29
  - U.S. president Bill Clinton and Vice President Al Gore are re-nominated at the Democratic National Convention in Chicago.
  - A Russian Tupolev Tu-154 jetliner crashes into a mountain as it approaches the airport at Spitsbergen, Norway, killing all 141 people on board.
- August 31 – Iraq disarmament crisis: Iraqi forces launch an offensive into the northern No-Fly Zone and capture Arbil.

=== September ===
The first flag of Afghanistan under the Taliban control until 1997

- September 2 – A permanent peace agreement is signed at Malacañang Palace between the Government of the Philippines and the Moro National Liberation Front.
- September 3 – The United States launches Operation Desert Strike against Iraq in reaction to the attack on Arbil.
- September 4 – The Revolutionary Armed Forces of Colombia attack a military base in Guaviare, Colombia, starting three weeks of guerrilla warfare that will claim the lives of at least 130 Colombians.
- September 5 – Hurricane Fran makes landfall near Cape Fear, North Carolina as a Category 3 storm with 115 mph (185 km/h) sustained winds. Fran caused over $3 billion in damages ($6.16 billion in present-day terms) and killed 27 people, mainly in North Carolina. The name "Fran" was retired due to the extensive damage.
- September 10 – Comprehensive Nuclear-Test-Ban Treaty (CTBT) signed (it will be ratified 180 days after ratification by 44 Annex 2 countries).
- September 13 – Alija Izetbegović is elected President of Bosnia and Herzegovina in the country's first election since the Bosnian War.
- September 20 – Leader of Pakistani opposition party Pakistan Peoples Party Murtaza Bhutto is killed during a gunfight with police.
- September 22 – The Panhellenic Socialist Movement under the leadership of Costas Simitis succeeds in the 1996 Greek legislative election.
- September 24 – U.S. president Bill Clinton signs the Comprehensive Nuclear-Test-Ban Treaty at the United Nations.
- September 27 – In Afghanistan, the Taliban capture the capital city of Kabul, after driving out President Burhanuddin Rabbani and executing former leader Mohammad Najibullah.

=== October ===
- October 2 – Aeroperú Flight 603 crashes into the Pacific Ocean when the instruments fail just after takeoff from Lima Airport, killing all 70 people on board.
- October 6 – The government of New Zealand agrees to pay $130 million worth of compensation for the loss of land suffered by the Māori population between the years of 1844 and 1864.
- October 22 – A fire at La Planta prison in southwest Caracas, Venezuela, kills thirty prisoners.
- October 31 – TAM Transportes Aéreos Regionais Flight 402 crashes into a densely populated area of São Paulo, killing all 96 people on board.

=== November ===
- November – Iraq disarmament crisis: UNSCOM inspectors uncover buried prohibited missile parts. Iraq refuses to allow UNSCOM teams to remove remnants of missile engines for analysis outside of the country.
- November 5 – 1996 United States presidential election: Incumbent Democratic President Bill Clinton defeats his Republican challenger, Bob Dole and Reform Party candidate Ross Perot.
- November 7
  - A category 4 cyclone strikes Andhra Pradesh, India, killing at least 1,000 people.
  - NASA launches the Mars Global Surveyor.
- November 8 – All 144 people on board a Nigerian-owned Boeing 727 die after the aircraft crashed into the Atlantic Ocean while approaching Lagos airport.
- November 12 – Saudi Arabian Airlines Boeing 747 collides in mid-air with Kazakhstan Airlines Il-76 in New Delhi, India, resulting in the loss of 349 lives.
- November 17
  - A bomb explodes in Kaspiysk, Russia, killing 32 people.
  - Emil Constantinescu is elected as President of Romania.
- November 18 – Frederick Chiluba is re-elected as President of Zambia.
- November 19
  - Martin Bryant is sentenced to 35 consecutive sentences of life imprisonment plus 1,035 years without parole for murdering 35 people in a shooting spree in Tasmania earlier this year.
  - Preparatory Commission for the Comprehensive Nuclear-Test-Ban Treaty Organization (CTBTO) established.
  - STS-80: Space Shuttle Columbia conducts the longest mission of the Space Shuttle program.
- November 20 – The 1996 Garley Building fire occurred in Hong Kong, resulting in 41 deaths and 81 injuries.
- November 21 – A propane explosion at the Humberto Vidal shoe store and office building in San Juan, Puerto Rico kills 33 people.
- November 23
  - The Republic of Angola officially joins the World Trade Organization as Angola.
  - Ethiopian Airlines Flight 961 is hijacked, then crashes into the Indian Ocean off the coast of Comoros after running out of fuel, killing 125.
- November 25 – An ice storm strikes the U.S. killing 26 directly and hundreds more from accidents. A powerful windstorm blasts Florida with winds gusts up to 90 mph.

=== December ===
- December 9 – Jerry Rawlings is re-elected as President of Ghana.
- December 11 – Tung Chee-hwa is appointed to become the new leader of Hong Kong after it reverts to Chinese rule on July 1, 1997, at the end of a 99-year lease to the United Kingdom.
- December 13 – Ghanaian diplomat Kofi Annan is elected by the United Nations Security Council the next Secretary-General of the United Nations.
- December 17 – The Túpac Amaru Revolutionary Movement takes 72 hostages in the Japanese Embassy in Lima, Peru.
- December 25 – At least 283 migrants drown in the sinking of F174 near Capo Passero (Sicily).
- December 27 – Taliban forces retake the strategic Bagram Air Base, solidifying their buffer zone around Kabul, Afghanistan.
- December 29 – Guatemala and the leaders of the Guatemalan National Revolutionary Unity sign a peace accord that ends the 36-year Guatemalan Civil War.
- December 30 – In the Indian state of Assam, a passenger train is bombed by Bodo separatists, killing 26.

== Births ==
=== January ===
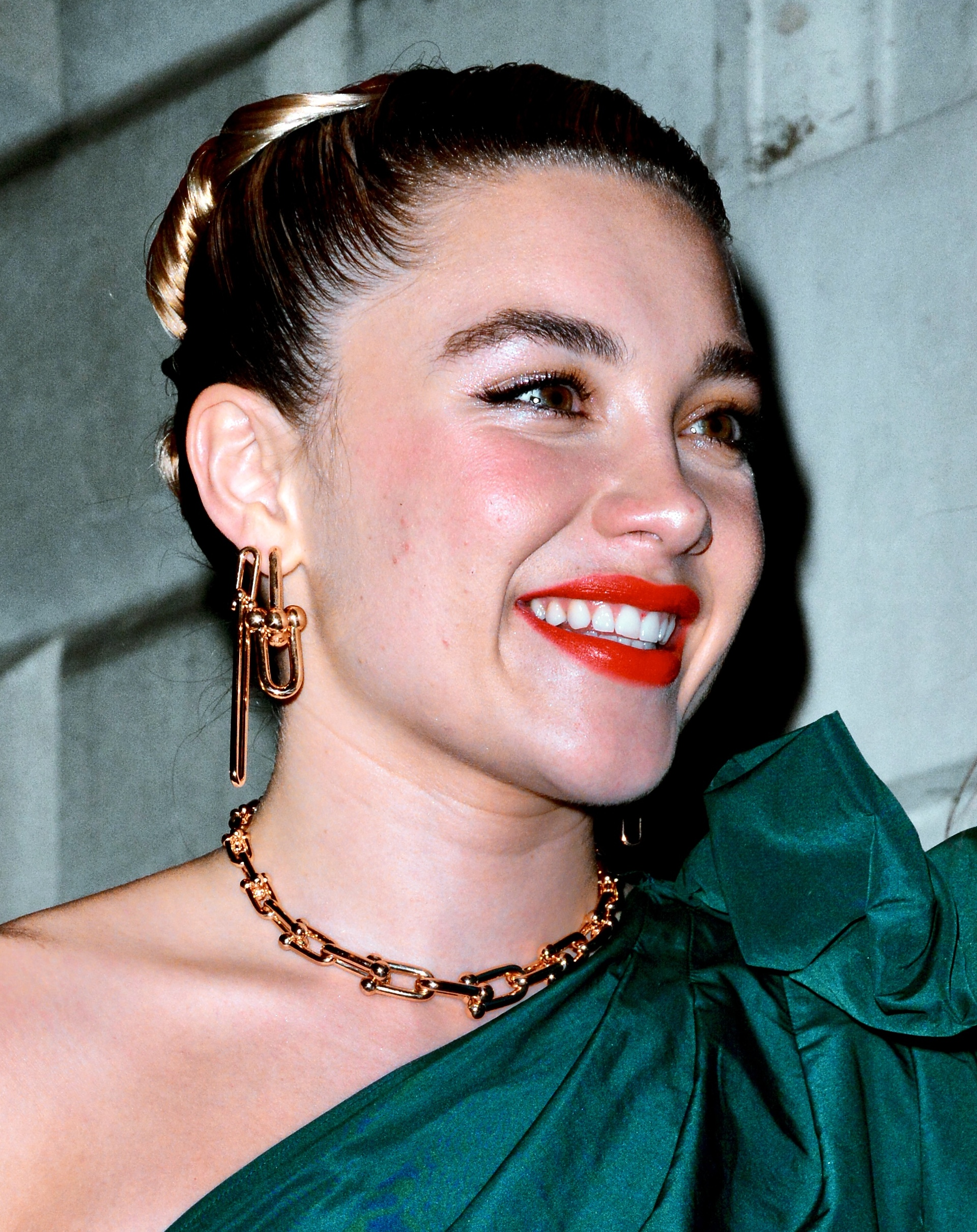
Florence Pugh

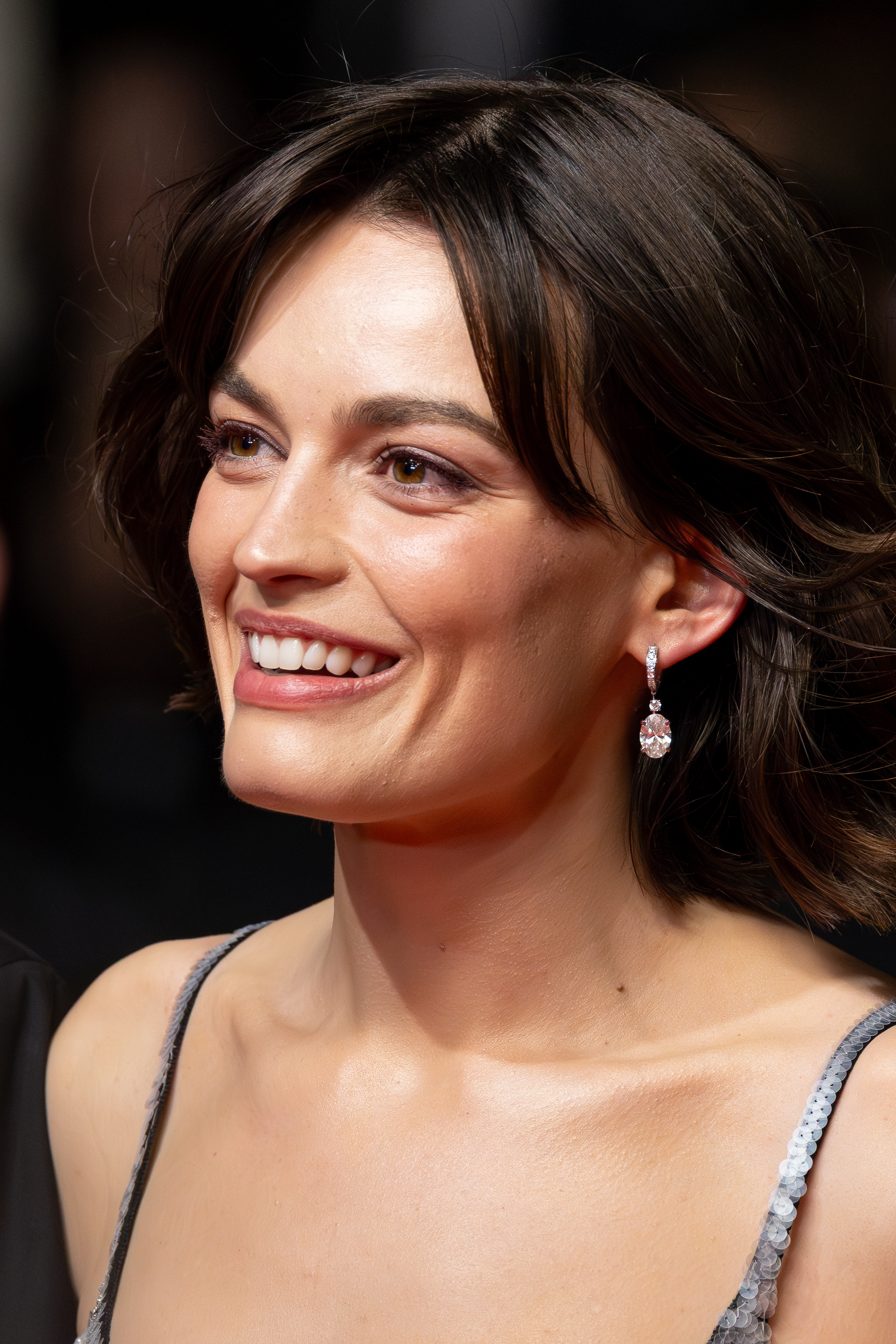
Emma Mackey

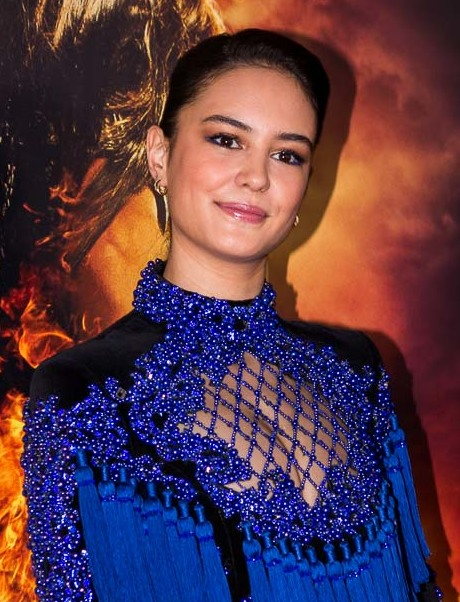
Courtney Eaton

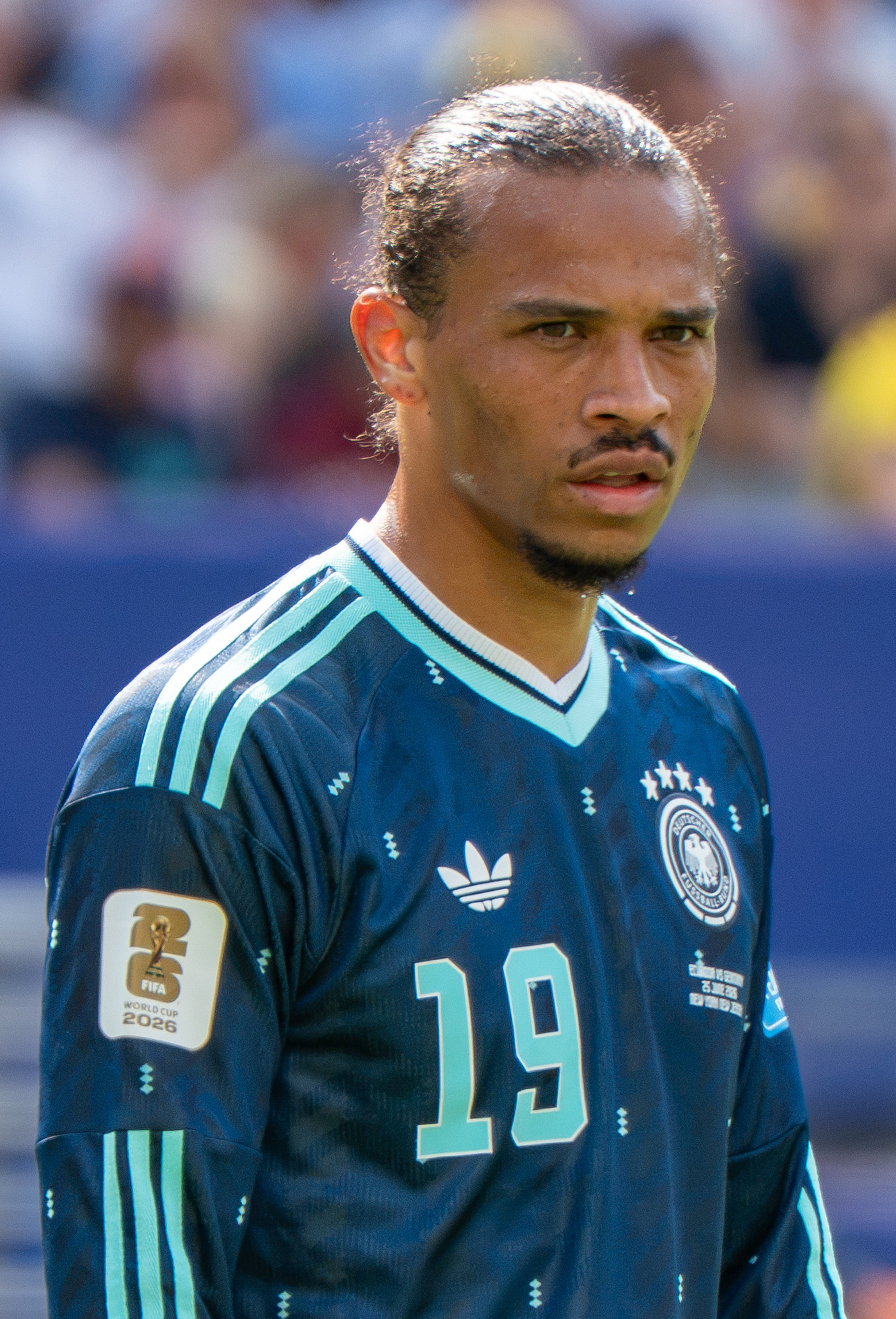
Leroy Sane

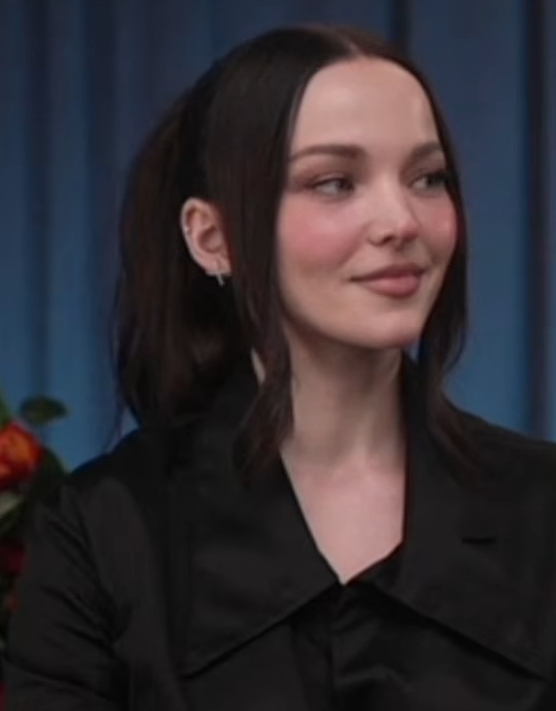
Dove Cameron

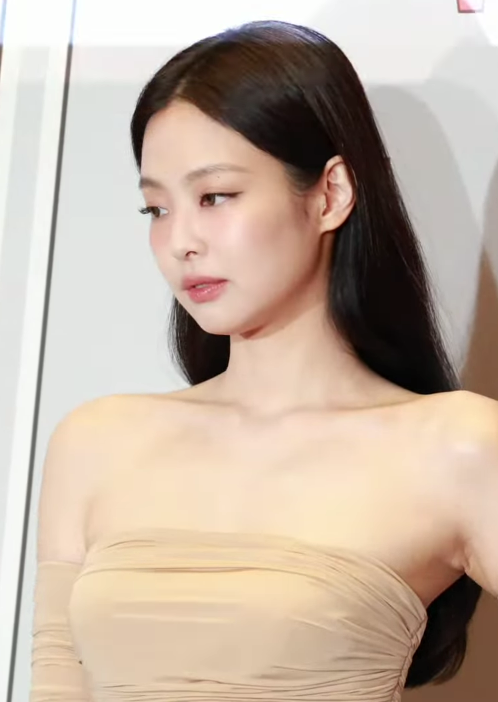
Jennie

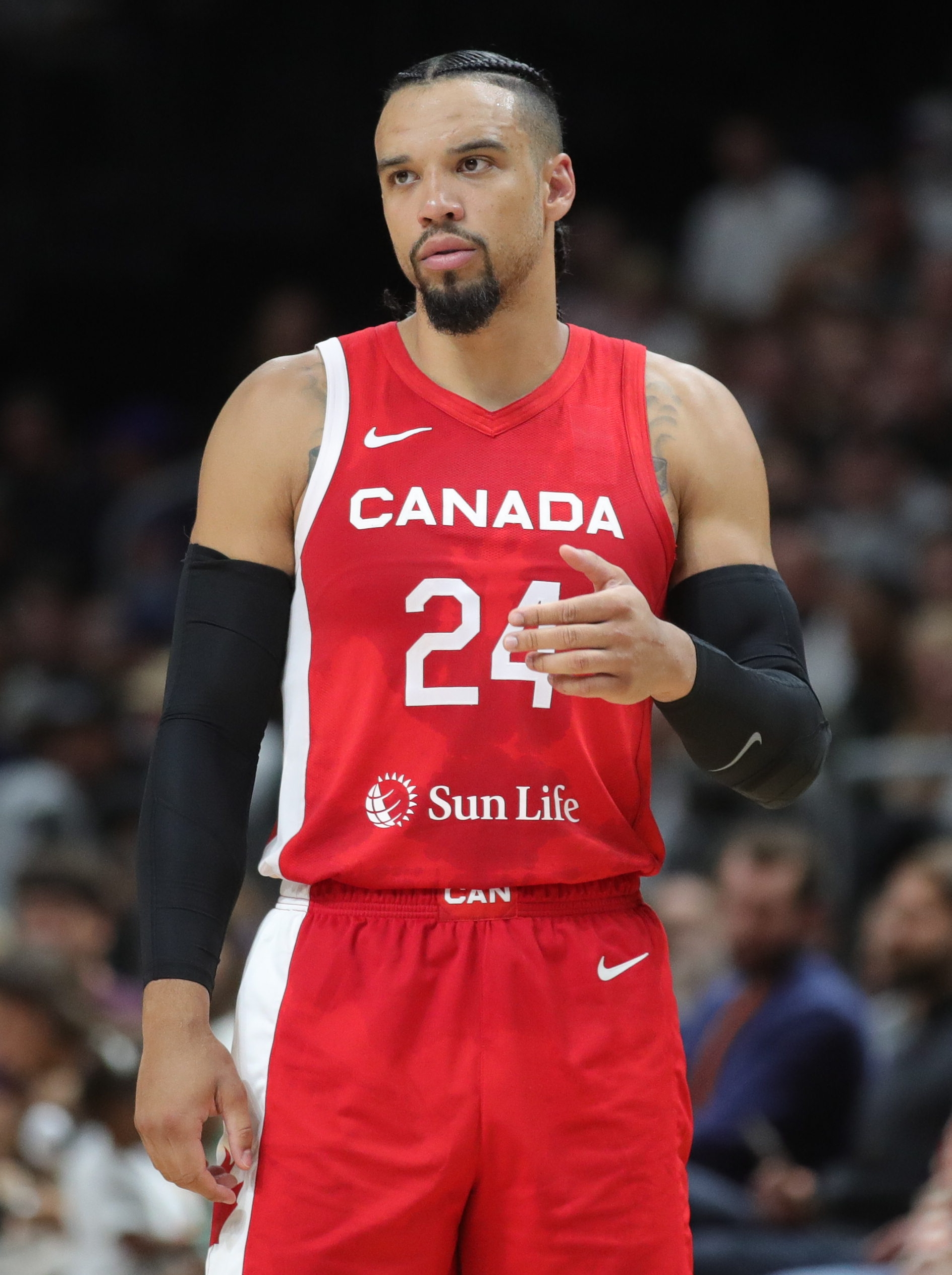
Dillon Brooks

- January 3 – Florence Pugh, English actress
- January 4 – Emma Mackey, British-French actress
- January 6
  - Soufiane El Bakkali, Moroccan steeplechase runner
  - Courtney Eaton, Australian actress
  - Harmanpreet Singh, Indian hockey player
- January 7 – Helly Shah, Indian actress
- January 10 – Budda Baker, American football safety
- January 11 – Leroy Sané, German footballer
- January 12 – Ella Henderson, English singer
- January 15 – Dove Cameron, American actress and singer
- January 16
  - Anastasia Grishina, Russian artistic gymnast
  - Jennie, South Korean singer and rapper
- January 17 – Nile Wilson, British artistic gymnast
- January 18 – Sarah Gilman, American actress
- January 21 – Marco Asensio, Spanish footballer
- January 22 – Dillon Brooks, Canadian basketball player
- January 24 – Patrik Schick, Czech footballer
- January 25 – Tati Gabrielle, American actress
- January 30 – Xiao Ruoteng, Chinese artistic gymnast
- January 31 – Joel Courtney, American actor

=== February ===
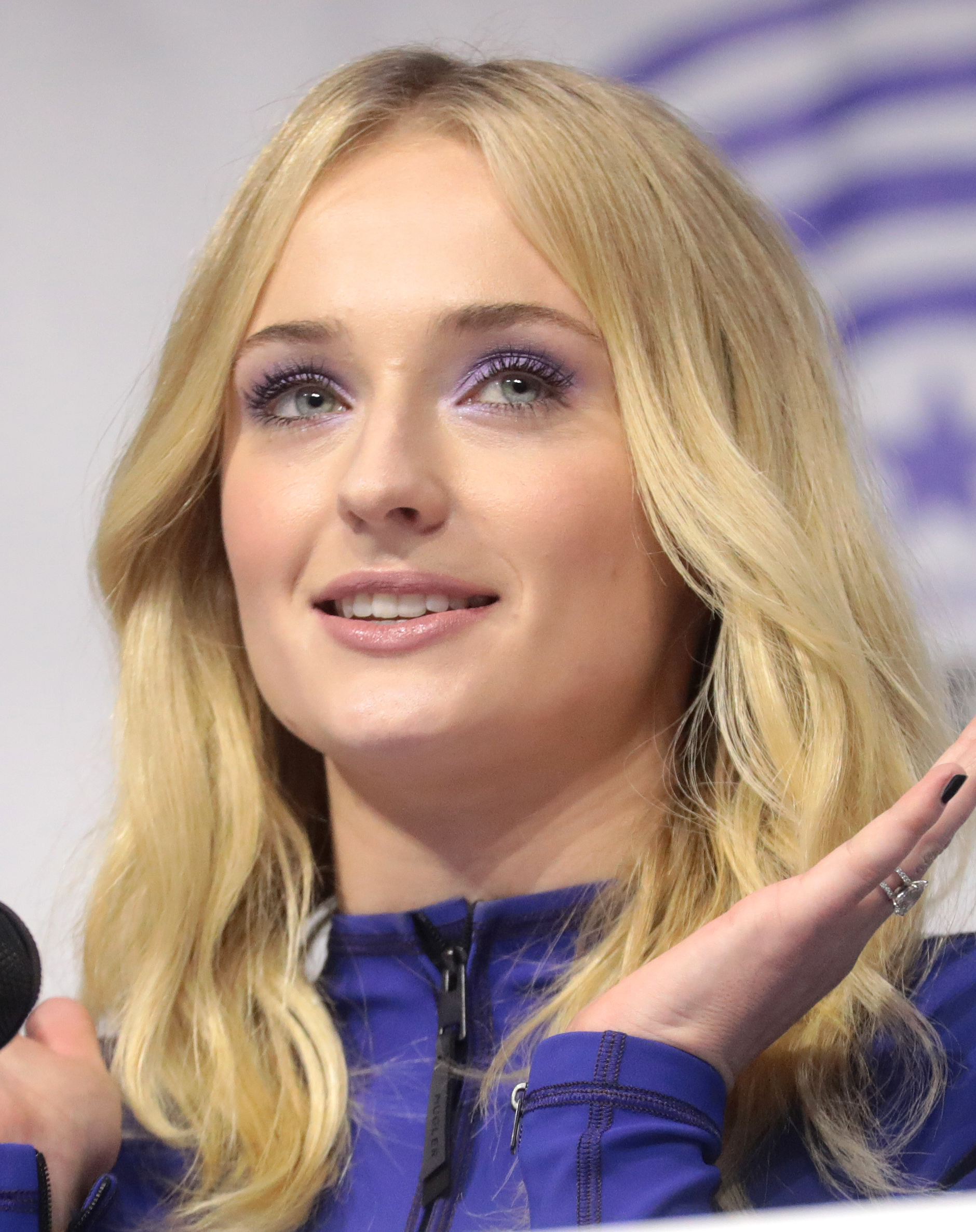
Sophie Turner

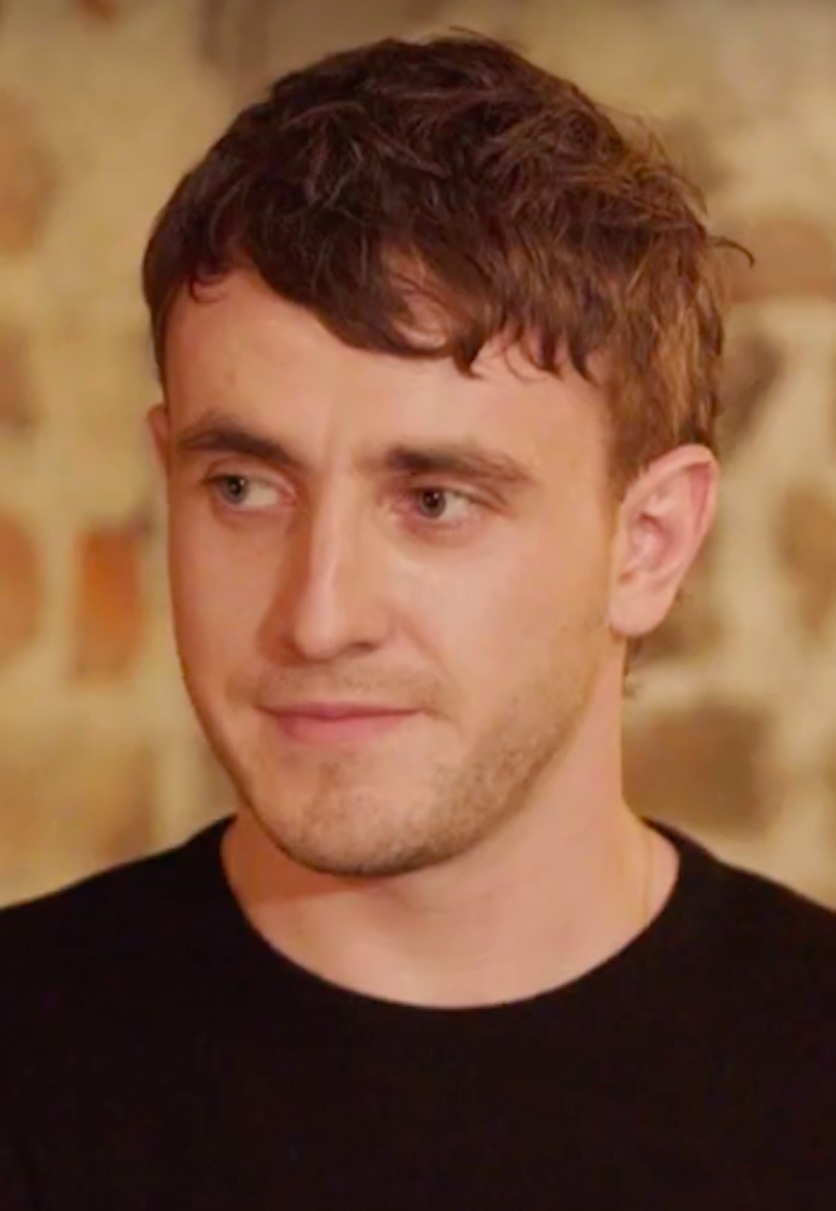
Paul Mescal

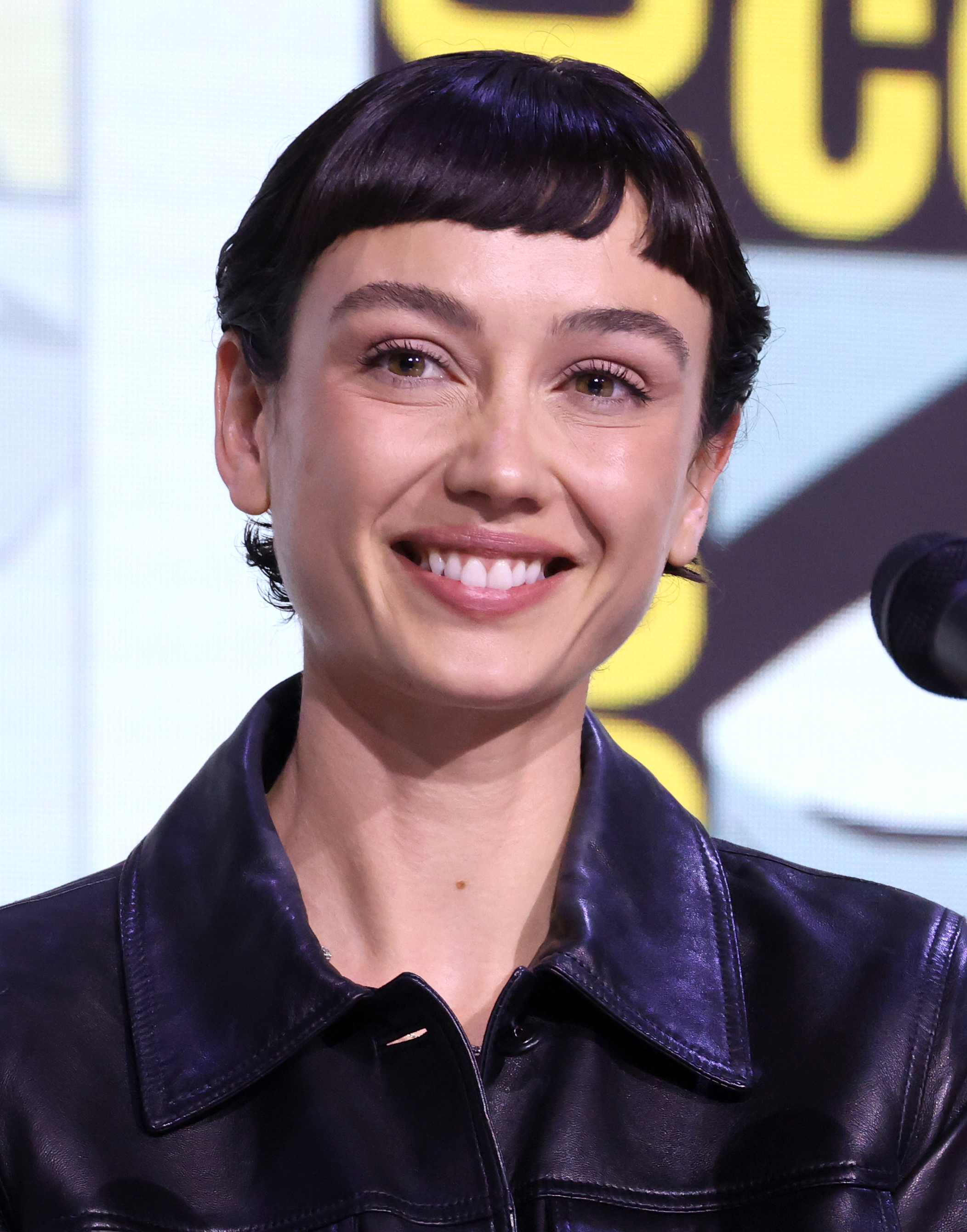
Sydney Chandler

- February 1 – Ahmad Abughaush, Jordanian taekwondo athlete
- February 2 – Paul Mescal. Irish actor
- February 7
  - Aaron Ekblad, Canadian ice hockey player
  - Mai Hagiwara, Japanese singer
- February 9
  - Jimmy Bennett, American actor
  - Kelli Berglund, American actress
  - Chung Ha, South Korean singer and dancer
- February 11
  - Lucas Torreira, Uruguayan footballer
  - Jonathan Tah, German footballer
  - Daniil Medvedev, Russian tennis player
- February 13 – Sydney Chandler, American actress
- February 14
  - Lucas Hernandez, French footballer
  - Viktor Kovalenko, Ukrainian footballer
- February 15 – Toshikazu Yamanishi, Japanese race walker
- February 17 – Sasha Pieterse, South African-born American actress
- February 19 – Ashnikko, American rapper, singer, and songwriter
- February 21 – Noah Rubin, American tennis player
- February 23 – D'Angelo Russell, American basketball player
- February 28
  - Shi Yuqi, Chinese badminton player
  - Karsten Warholm, Norwegian sprinter

=== March ===
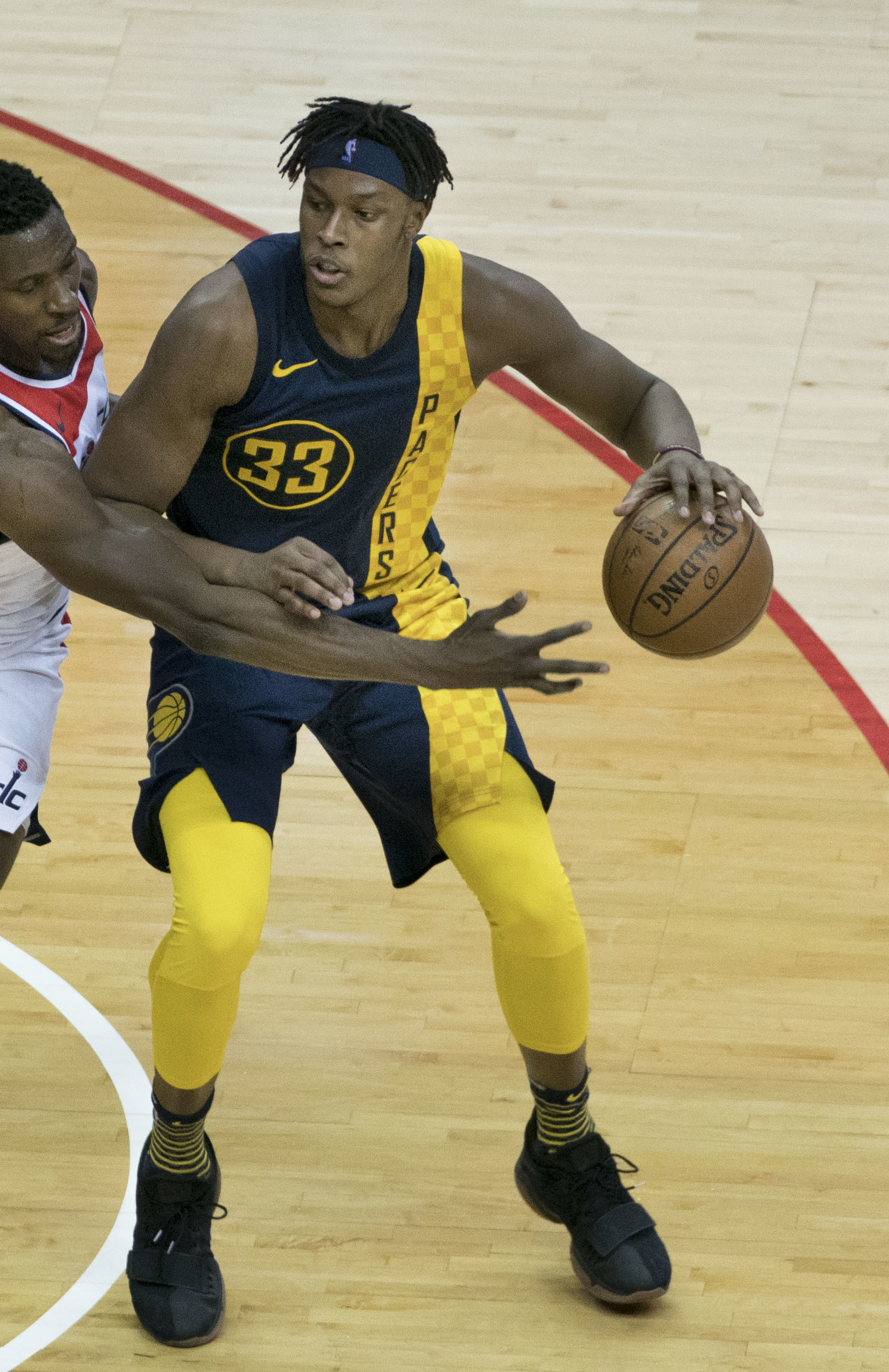
Myles Turner

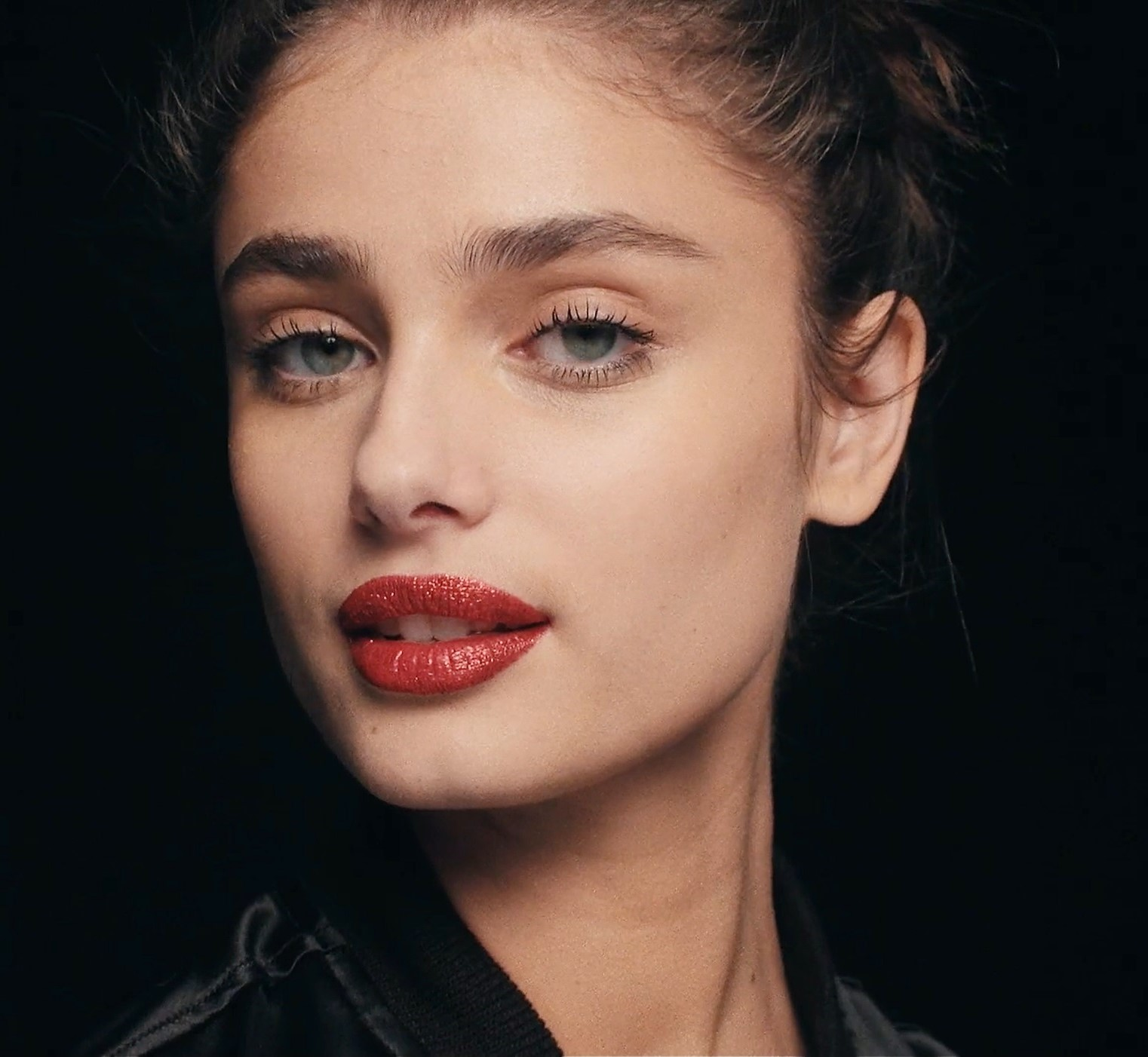
Taylor Hill

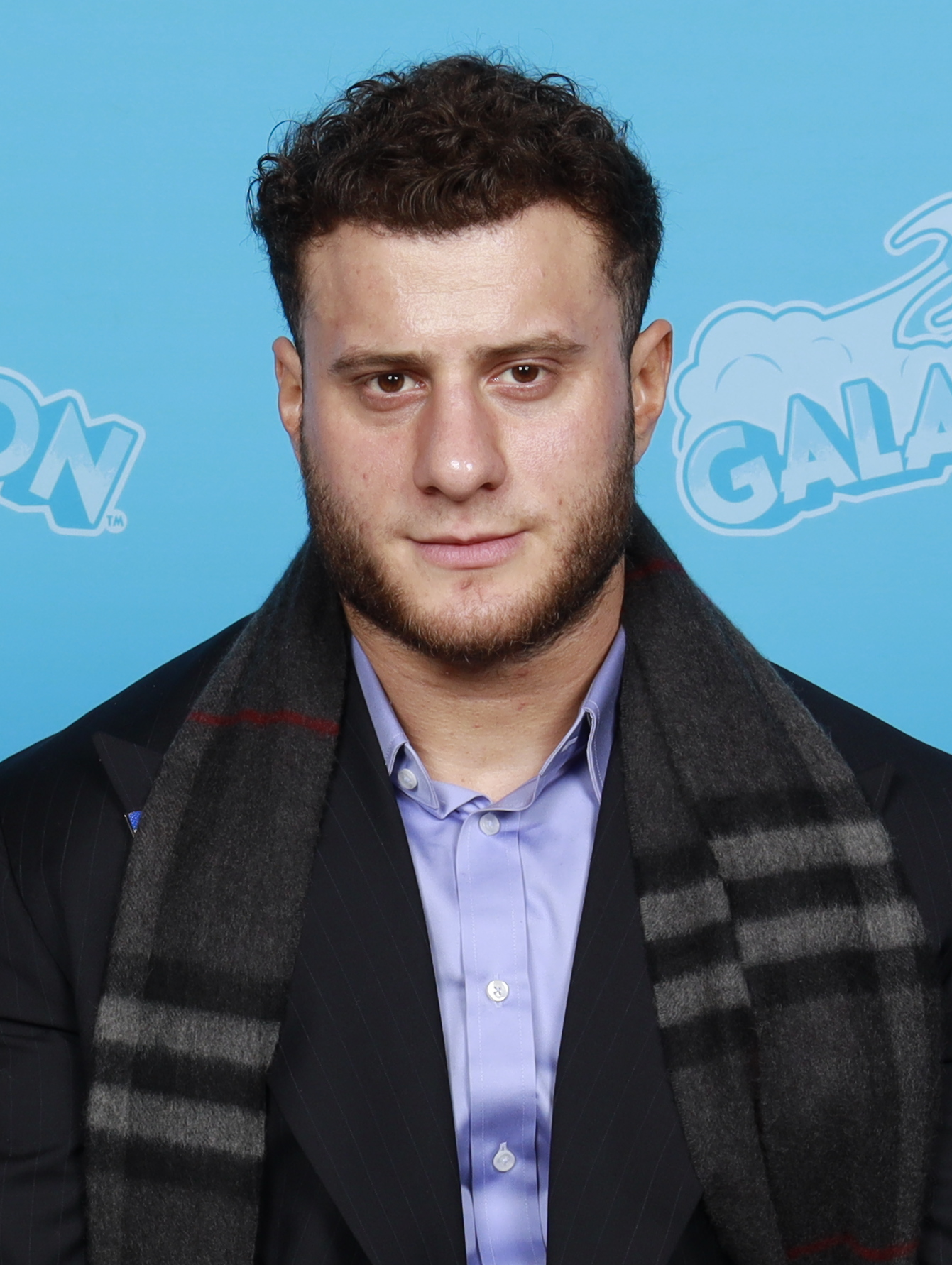
Maxwell Jacob Friedman

- March 1 – Ye Shiwen, Chinese swimmer
- March 5
  - Emmanuel Mudiay, Congolese professional basketball player
  - Taylor Hill, American model
- March 6
  - Christian Coleman, American sprinter
  - Timo Werner, German footballer
  - Yan Han, Chinese figure skater
- March 9 – Giorgio Minisini, Italian synchronized swimmer
- March 15 – Maxwell Jacob Friedman, American professional wrestler
- March 16 – Ajiona Alexus, American actress
- March 18 – Lilli Kay, American actress
- March 19 – Yung Gravy, American rapper
- March 23 – Alexander Albon, Thai racing driver
- March 24
  - Valentino Lazaro, Austrian footballer
  - Myles Turner, American basketball player
- March 26 – Kathryn Bernardo, Filipina actress
- March 27 – Rosabell Laurenti Sellers, Italian-American actress
- March 28
  - Benjamin Pavard, French footballer
  - Xie Siyi, Chinese diver

=== April ===
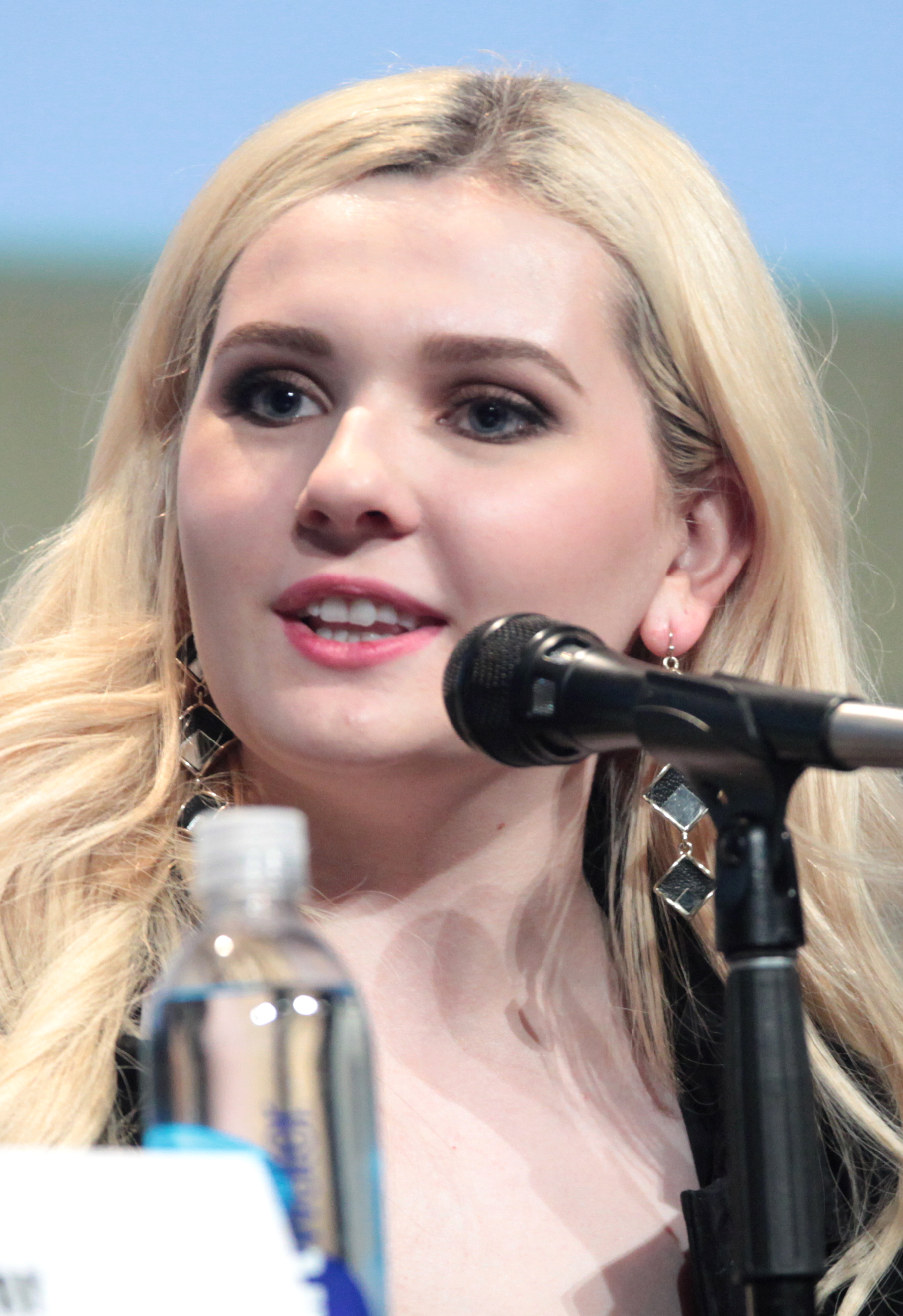
Abigail Breslin

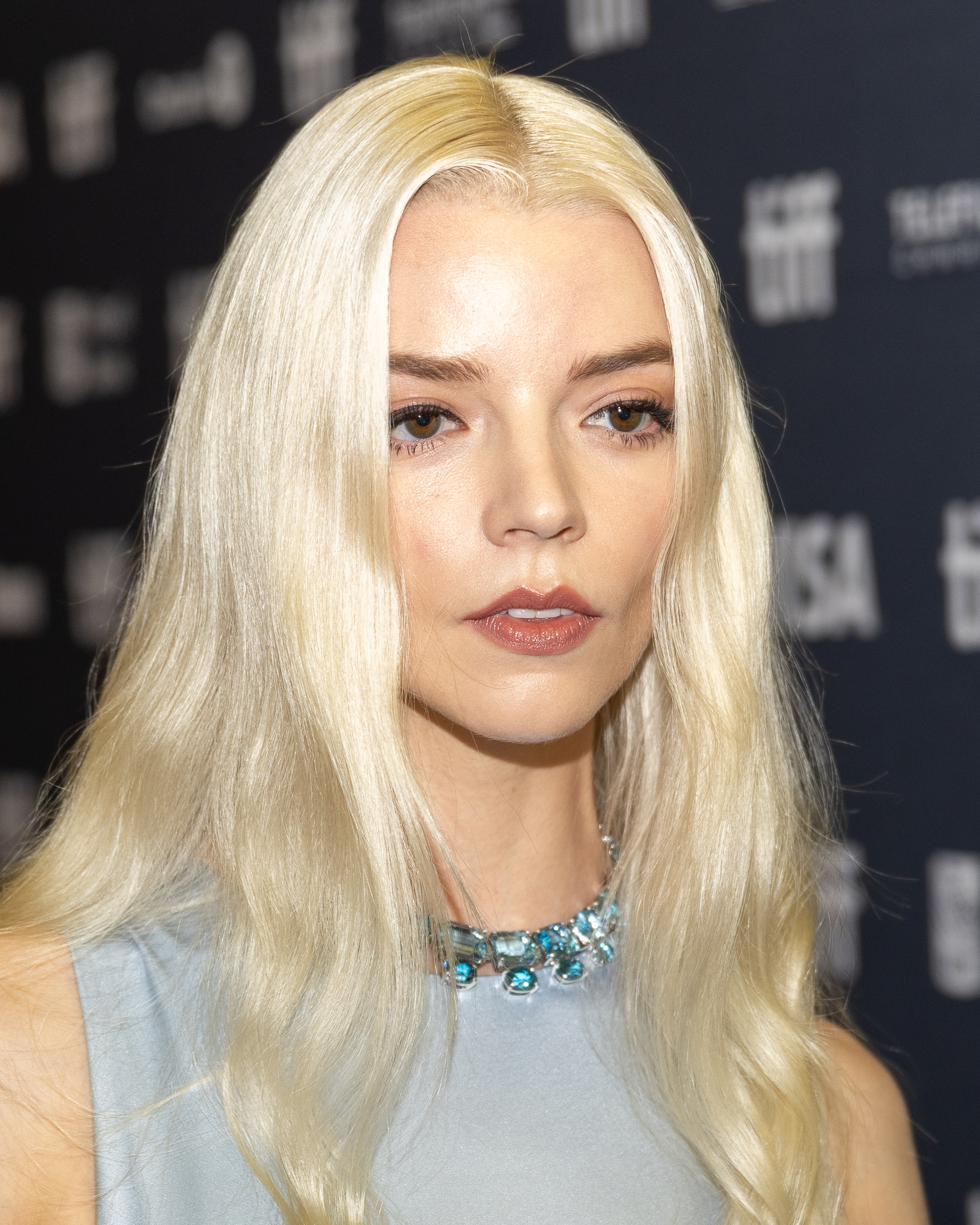
Anya Taylor-Joy

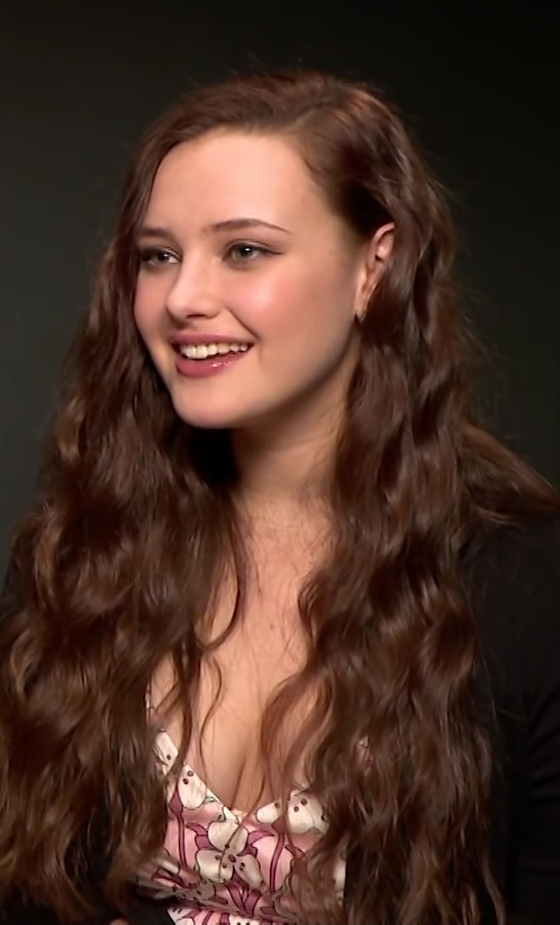
Katherine Langford

- April 1 – Sophia Hutchins, American socialite (d. 2025)
- April 2
  - Polina Agafonova, Russian figure skater
  - Matheus Santana, Brazilian swimmer
  - Zach Bryan, American singer-songwriter
- April 3
  - Sarah Jeffery, Canadian actress
  - Fabián Ruiz, Spanish footballer
- April 4
  - Austin Mahone, American singer-songwriter and actor
  - Mitch Keller, American baseball pitcher
- April 9 – Giovani Lo Celso, Argentinian footballer
- April 10
  - Andreas Christensen, Danish footballer
  - Thanasi Kokkinakis, Australian tennis player
  - Loïc Nottet, Belgian singer
- April 11
  - Dele Alli, English footballer
  - Summer Walker, American singer
- April 12 – Matteo Berrettini, Italian tennis player
- April 14 – Abigail Breslin, American actress
- April 15 – Edimilson Fernandes, Swiss footballer
- April 16 – Anya Taylor-Joy, actress
- April 17 – Dee Dee Davis, American actress
- April 22 – Wendy Sulca, Peruvian singer
- April 23 – Álex Márquez, Spanish motorcycle racer
- April 24 – Ashleigh Barty, Australian tennis player
- April 25
  - Mack Horton, Australian swimmer
  - Nils van der Poel, former Swedish speed skater
- April 28 – Tony Revolori, American actor
- April 29 – Katherine Langford, Australian actress

=== May ===
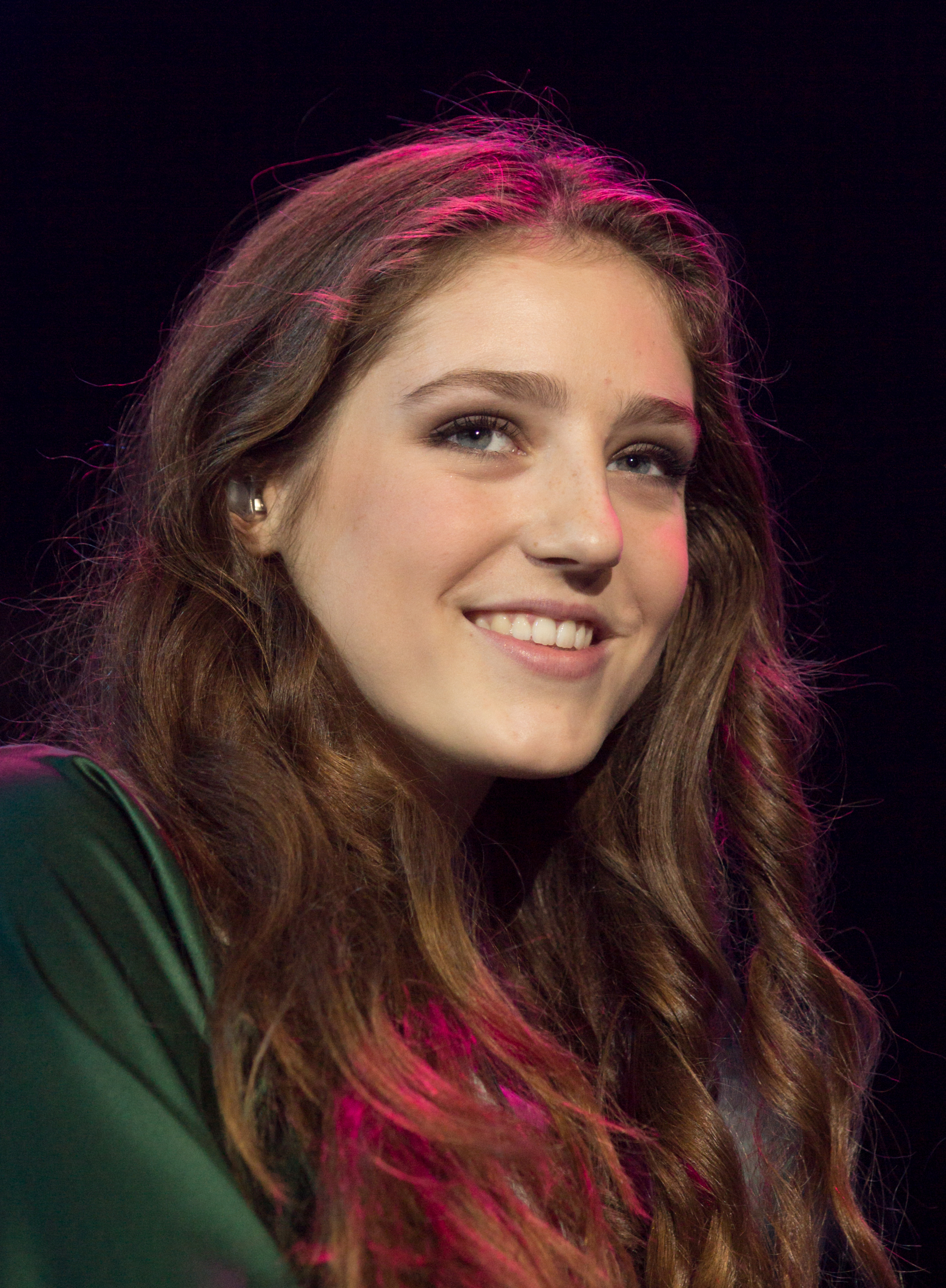
Birdy

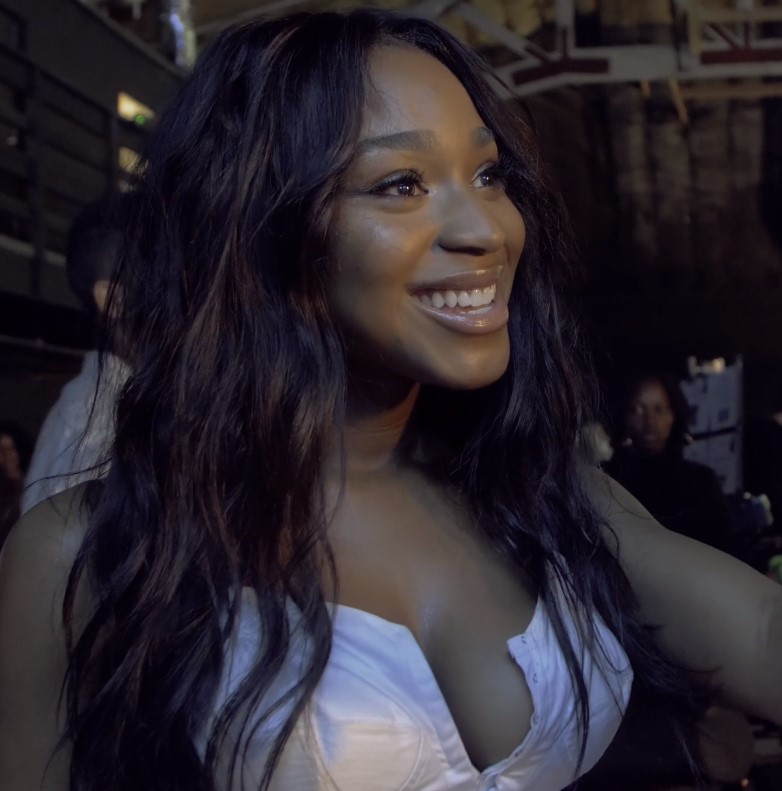
Normani

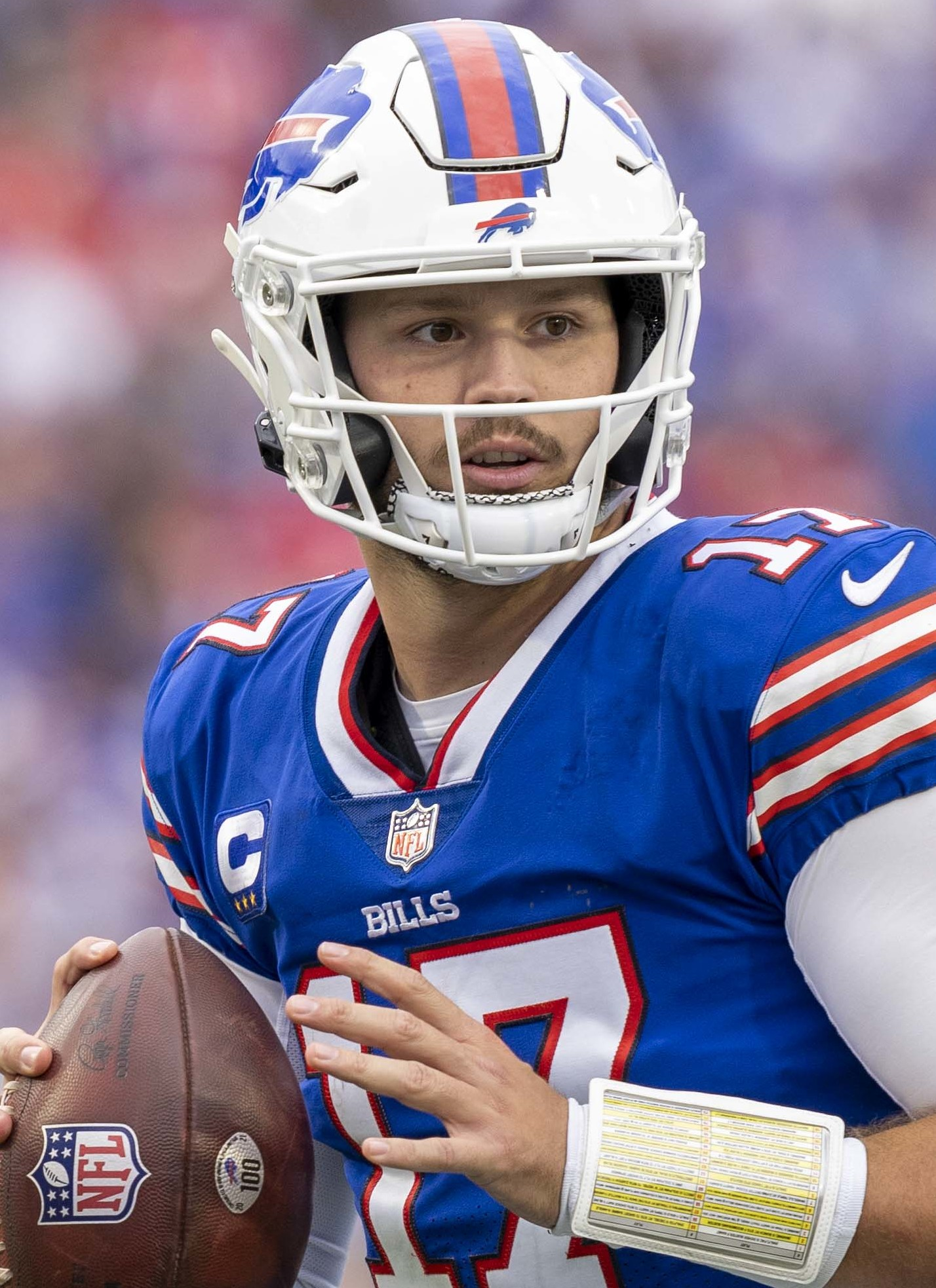
Josh Allen

- May 2 – Julian Brandt, German footballer
- May 3
  - Alex Iwobi, Nigerian footballer
  - Domantas Sabonis, Lithuanian-American basketball player
- May 4
  - Arielle Gold, American snowboarder
  - Pelayo Roza, Spanish sprint canoeist.
- May 8 – 6ix9ine, American rapper
- May 9
  - Noah Centineo, American actor
  - Mary Mouser, American actress
- May 10 – Tyus Jones, American basketball player
- May 11 – Andrés Cubas, Argentinian footballer
- May 14 – Martin Garrix, Dutch DJ and producer
- May 15 – Birdy, British singer and songwriter
- May 19
  - Chung Hyeon, South Korean tennis player
  - Lakshmi Menon, Indian film actress
- May 18 – Yuki Kadono, Japanese snowboarder
- May 21
  - Josh Allen, American football quarterback
  - Karen Khachanov, Russian tennis player
- May 23 – Katharina Althaus, German ski jumper
- May 30 – Aleksandr Golovin, Russian footballer
- May 31 – Normani, American singer

=== June ===
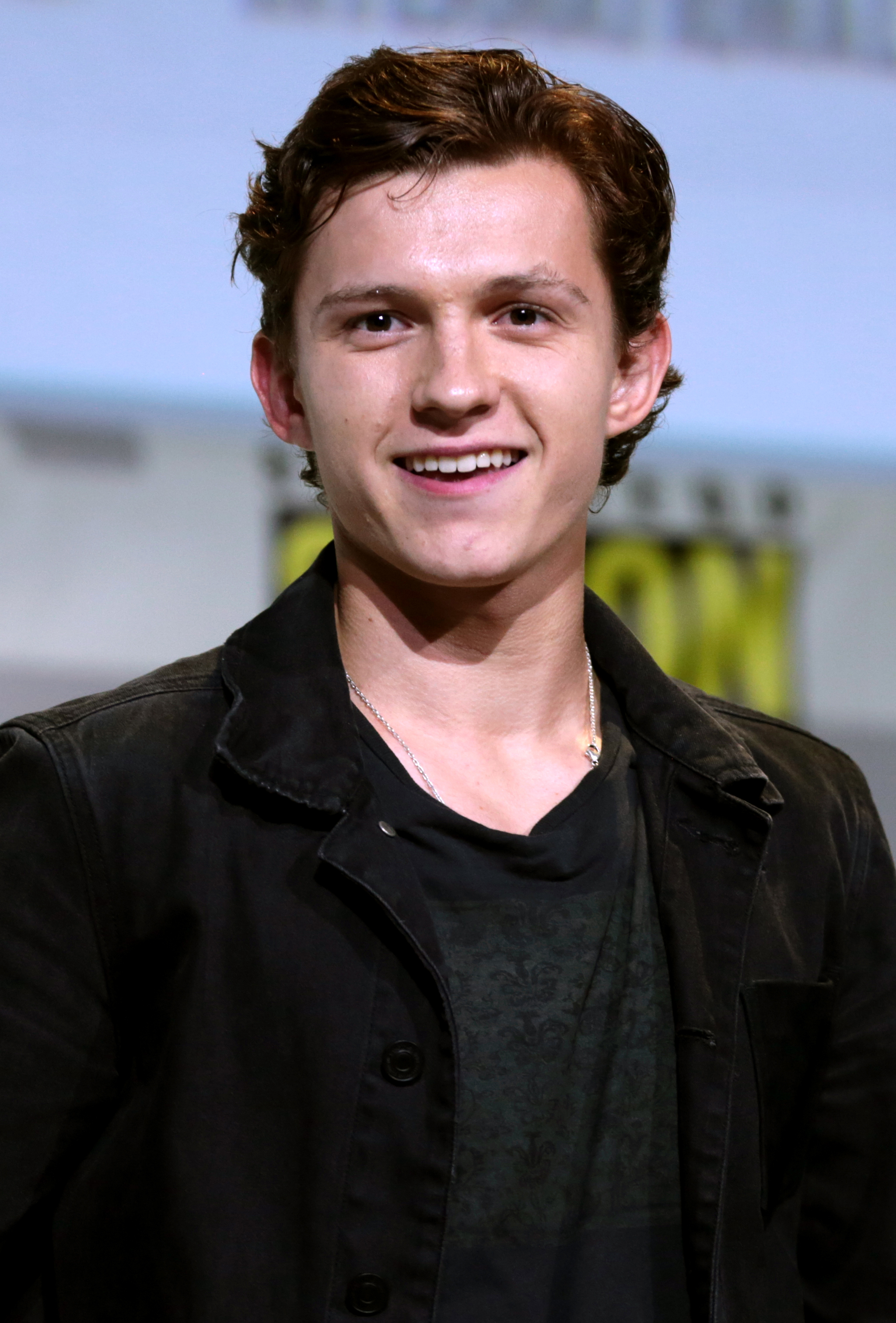
Tom Holland

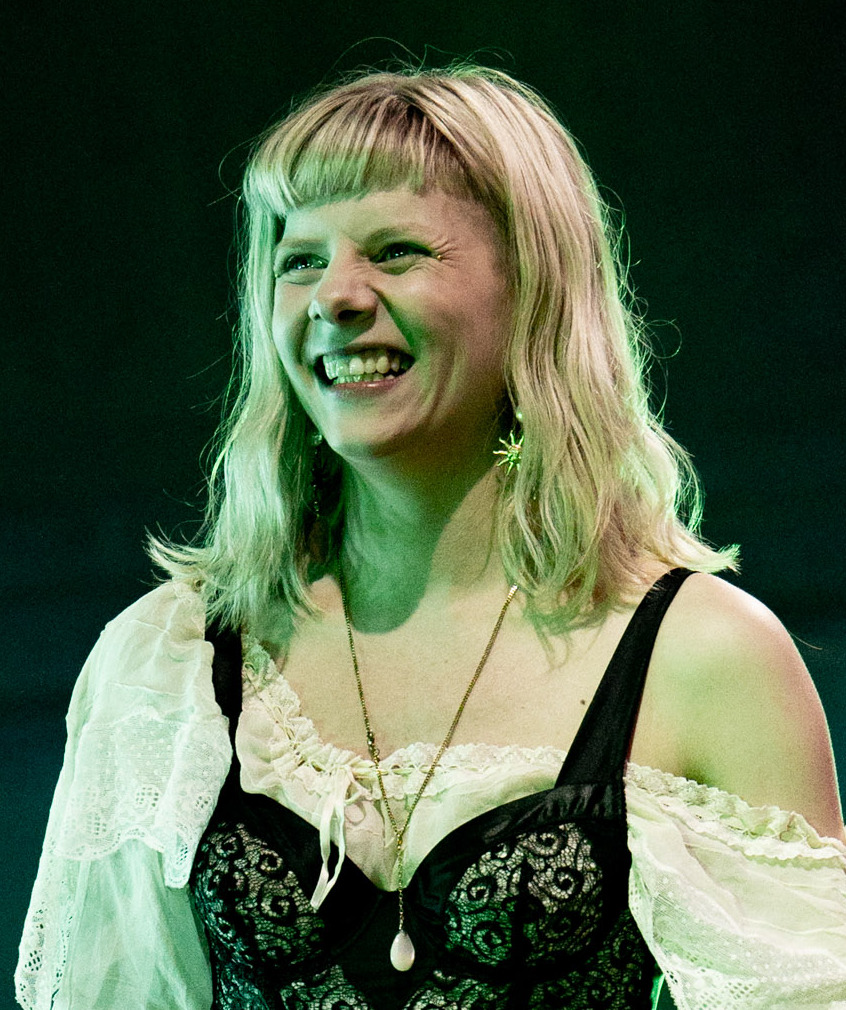
Aurora

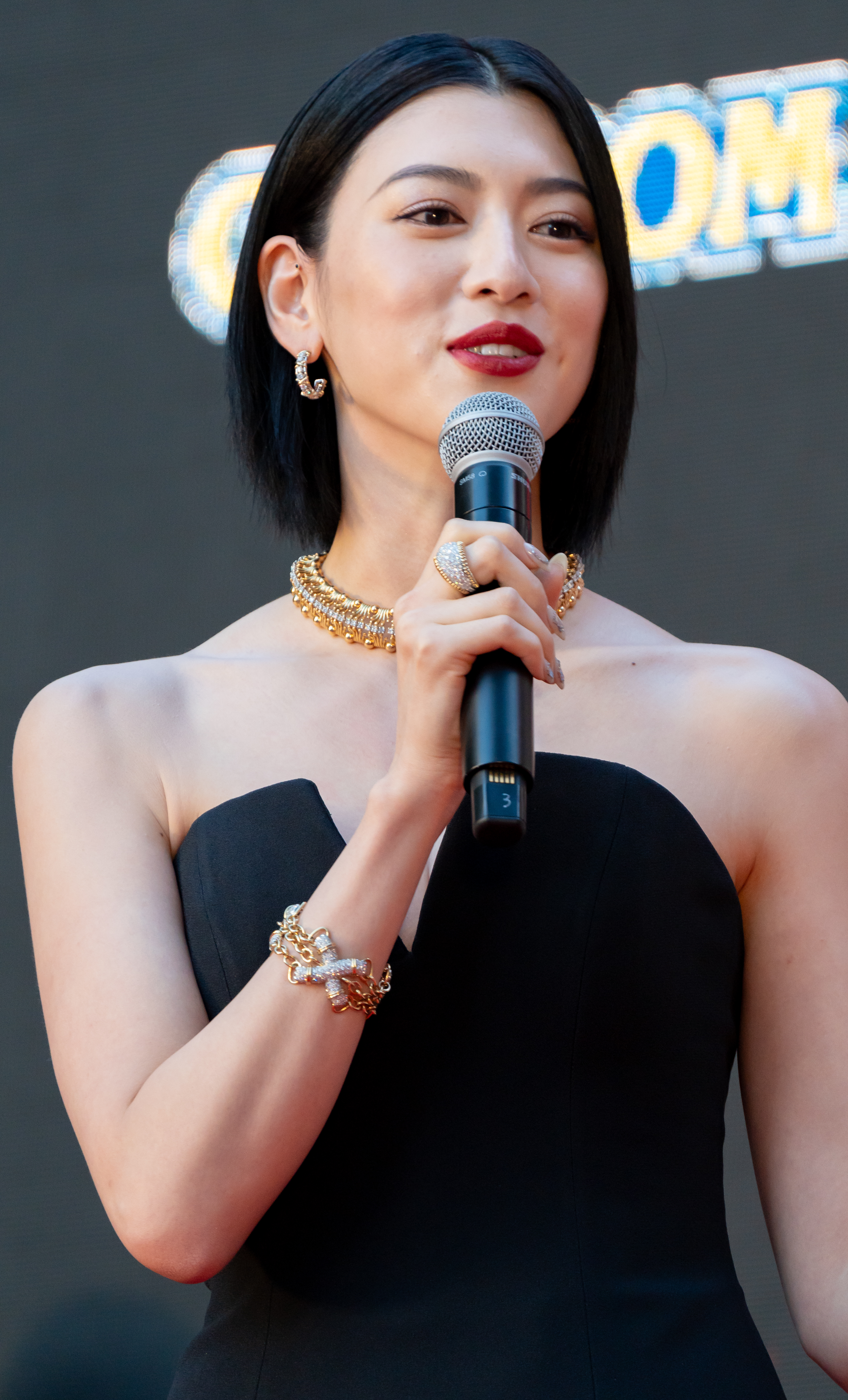
Ayaka Miyoshi

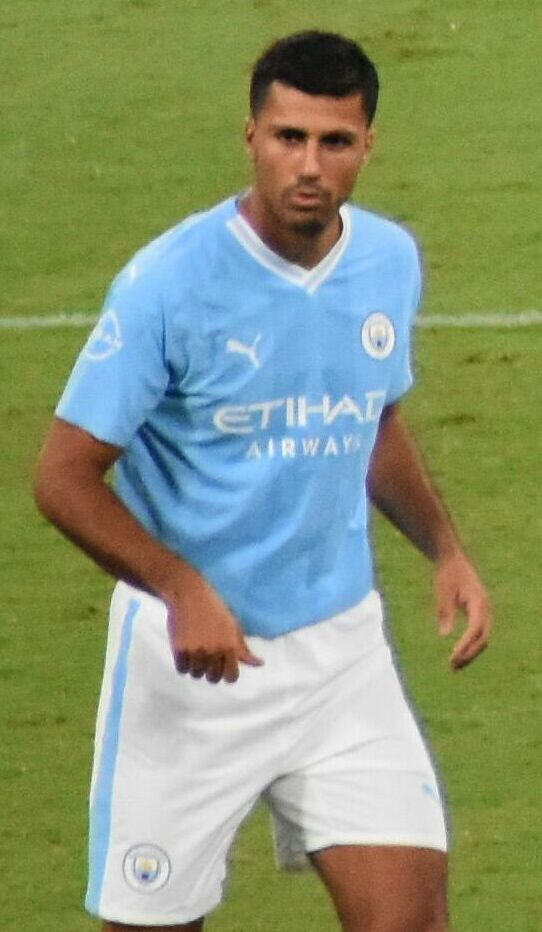
Rodri

- June 1 – Tom Holland, English actor
- June 3 – Han Tianyu, Chinese short track speed skater
- June 4 – Maria Bakalova, Bulgarian actress
- June 5 – Harold Landry, American football linebacker
- June 7 – Christian McCaffrey, American football running back
- June 12 – Davinson Sánchez, Colombian footballer
- June 13
  - Kingsley Coman, French footballer
  - Kodi Smit-McPhee, Australian actor
- June 15 – Aurora, Norwegian singer
- June 16 – Lily Zhang, American table tennis player
- June 17 – Godfred Donsah, Ghanese footballer
- June 18
  - Alen Halilović, Croatian footballer
  - Ayaka Miyoshi, Japanese actress and model
- June 19 – Larisa Iordache, Romanian artistic gymnast
- June 22
  - Hugo Calderano, Brazilian table tennis player
  - Kong Sang-jeong, South Korean short track speed skater
  - Rodri, Spanish footballer
  - Mikel Merino, Spanish footballer
- June 24 – Harris Dickinson, English actor, writer, and director
- June 27 – Lauren Jauregui, American singer
- June 28
  - Milot Rashica, Kosovar footballer
  - Donna Vekić, Croatian tennis player

=== July ===
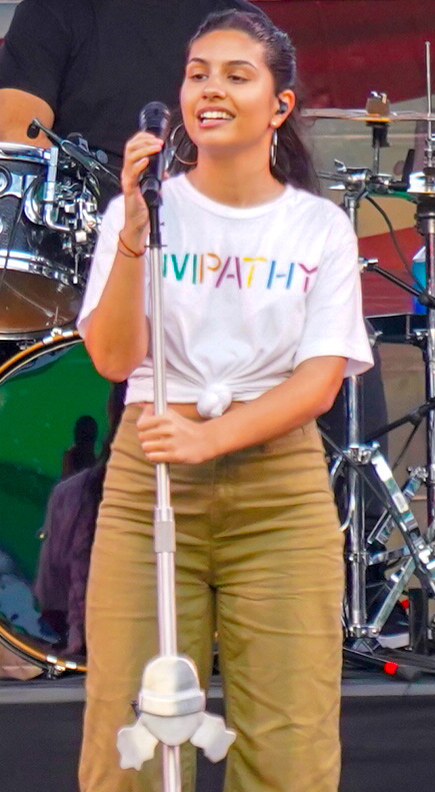
Alessia Cara

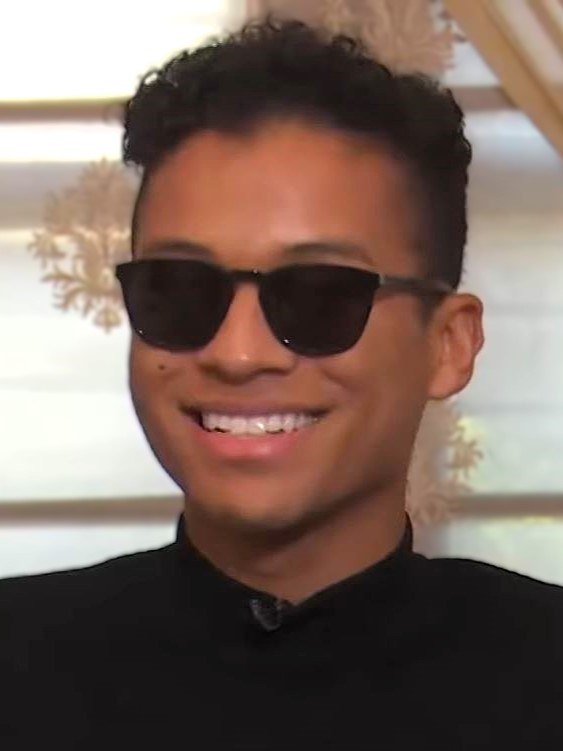
Jaafar Jackson

- July 1 – Adelina Sotnikova, former Russian figure skater
- July 3 – Kendji Girac, French singer
- July 4 – Ryoya Kurihara, Japanese baseball player
- July 5 – Risa Shōji, Japanese figure skater
- July 7 – Mikey Musumeci, American BJJ practitioner and current ONE Flyweight Submission Grappling World Champion
- July 10 – Moon Ga-young, South Korean actress
- July 11
  - Alessia Cara, Canadian singer-songwriter
  - Andrija Živković, Serbian footballer
- July 16
  - Cooper Koch, American actor
  - Kevin Abstract, American rapper, singer and songwriter
- July 18 – Yung Lean, Swedish rapper and record producer
- July 20 – Ben Simmons, Australian basketball player
- July 22 – Skyler Gisondo, American actor
- July 30 – Jacob Lofland, American actor

=== August ===
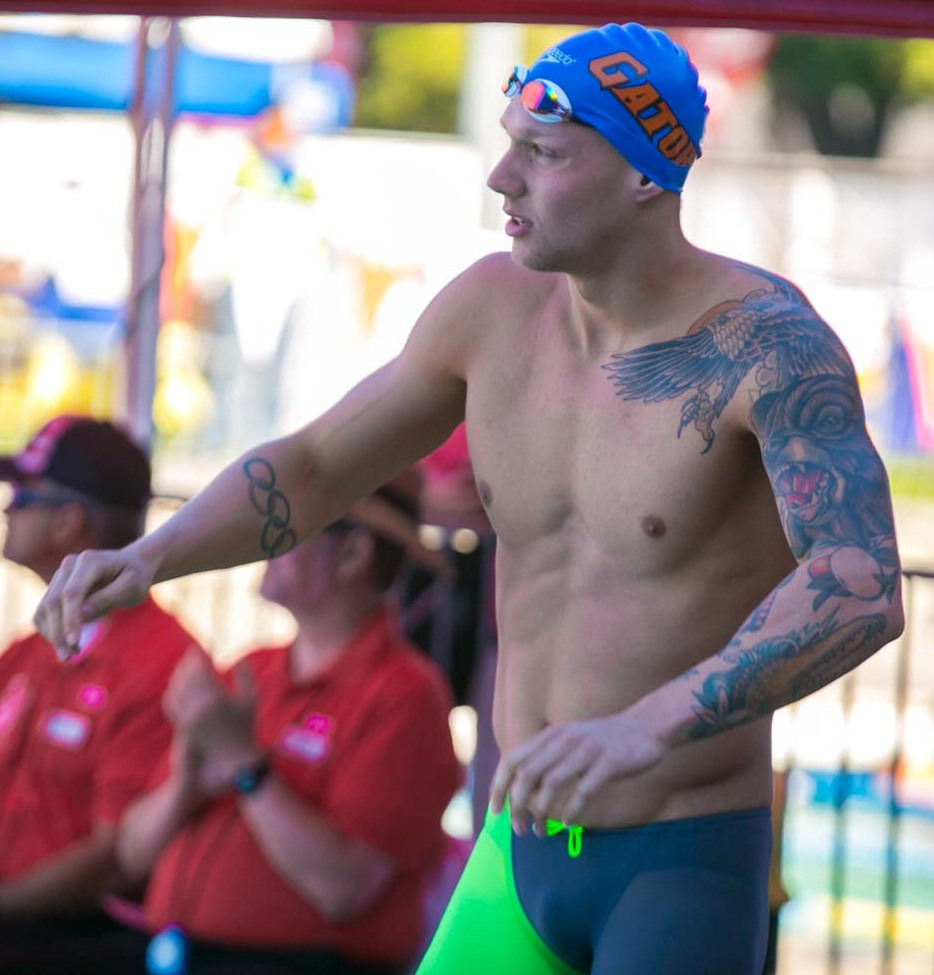
Caeleb Dressel

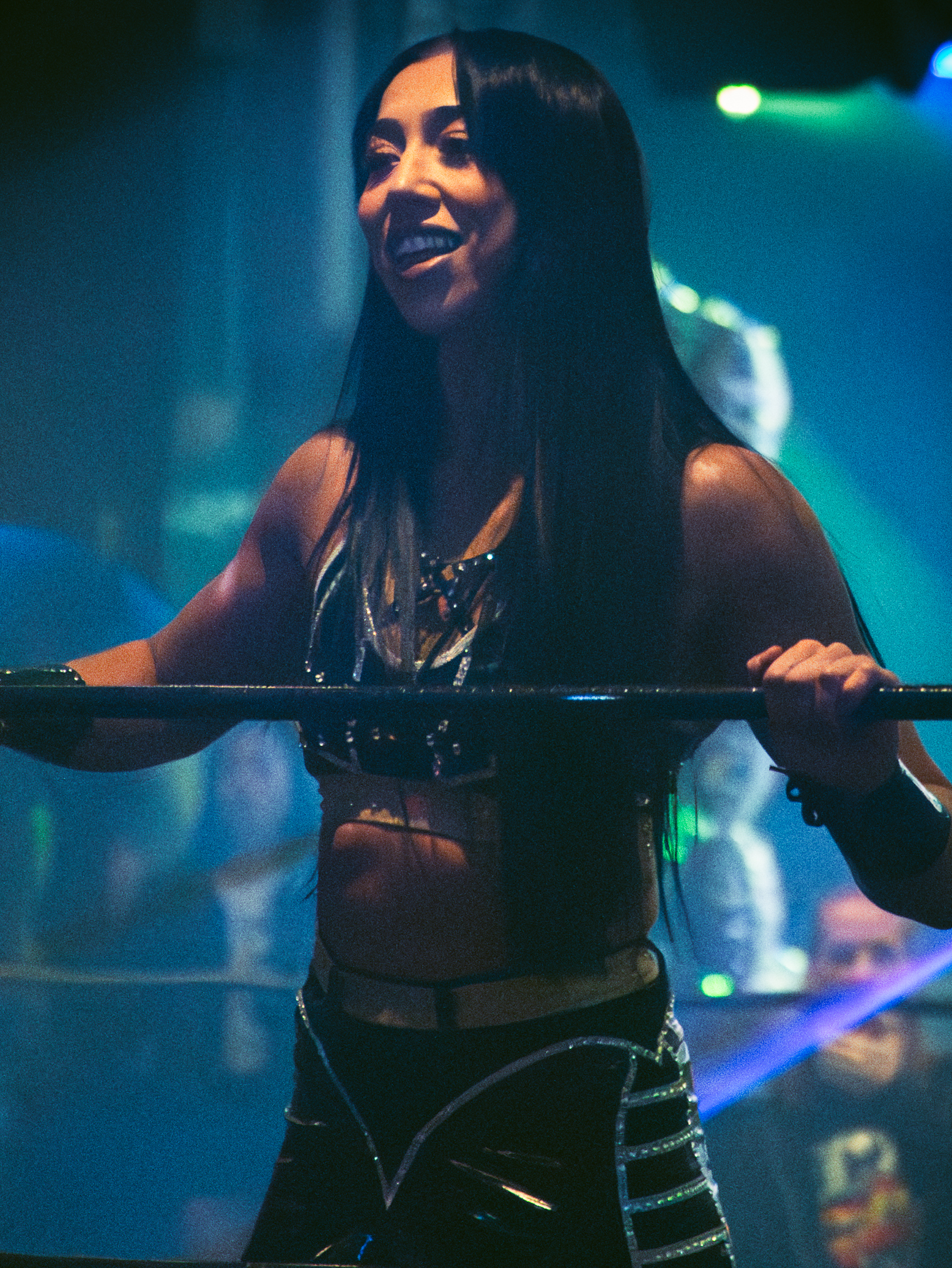
Indi Hartwell

- August 2
  - Pomme, French singer
  - Simone Manuel, American swimmer
- August 5
  - Francesca Deagostini, Italian artistic gymnast
  - Mai Murakami, Japanese artistic gymnast
- August 12 – Arthur, Brazilian footballer
- August 14 – Brianna Hildebrand, American actress
- August 16 – Caeleb Dressel, American swimmer
- August 17 – Indi Hartwell, Australian professional wrestler
- August 18 – Jonathan Di Bella, Italian-Canadian kickboxer and current ONE Strawweight Kickboxing World Champion
- August 19
  - Almoez Ali, Sudanese-Qatari footballer
  - Laura Tesoro, Belgian singer and actress
- August 21 – Jasmine Camacho-Quinn, Puerto Rican hurdler
- August 24 – Kenzō Shirai, Japanese gymnast
- August 28 – Kim Se-jeong, South Korean singer and actress
- August 30
  - Gabriel Barbosa, Brazilian footballer
  - Chen Dequan, Chinese short track speed skater
  - Mikal Bridges, American basketball player
- August 31 – Jalen Brunson, American basketball player

=== September ===
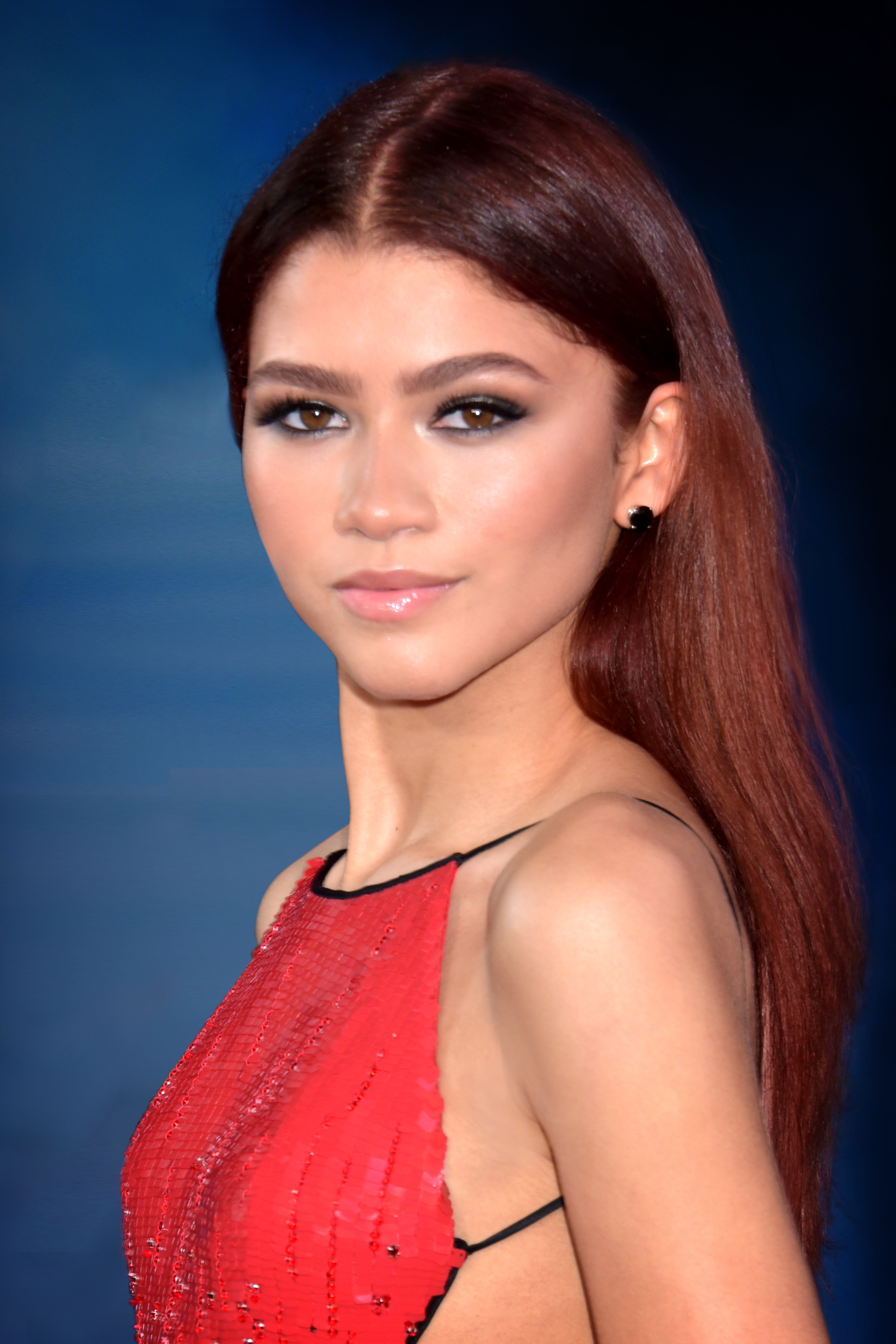
Zendaya

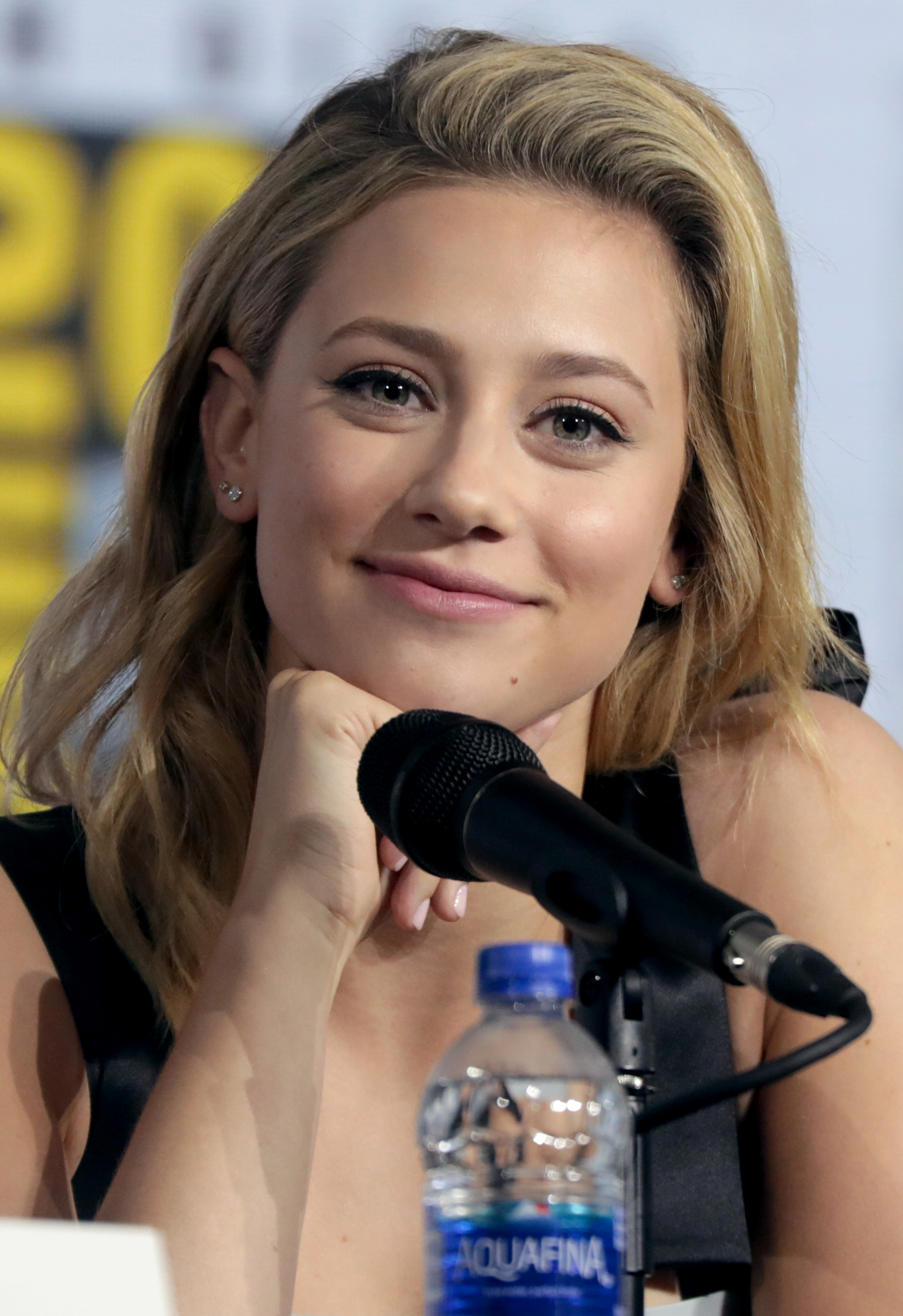
Lili Reinhart

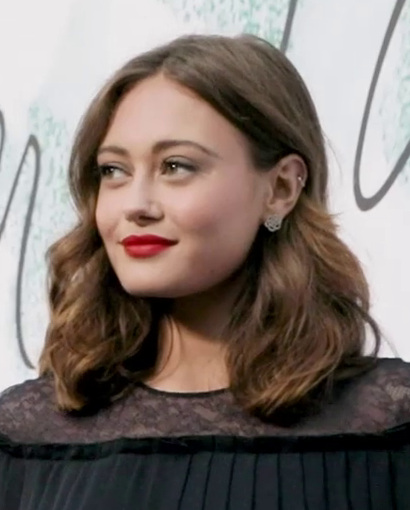
Ella Purnell

- September 1 – Zendaya, American actress and singer
- September 2 – Austin Abrams, American actor
- September 3 – Joy, South Korean singer and actress
- September 5 – Sigrid, Norwegian singer
- September 7 – Donovan Mitchell, American basketball player
- September 12
  - Joshua Cheptegei, Ugandan long-distance runner
  - Colin Ford, American actor
- September 13 – Lili Reinhart, American actress
- September 14 – Leo Woodall, British actor
- September 17
  - Duje Ćaleta-Car, Croatian footballer
  - Esteban Ocon, French racing driver
  - Ella Purnell, English actress
  - Slayyyter, American singer-songwriter
- September 19 – Steve Wijler, Dutch archer
  - Dejounte Murray, American basketball player
- September 20 – Tay Keith, American record producer (d. 2026)
- September 23 – Lee Hi, South Korean singer-songwriter
- September 27 – Maxwel Cornet, French-Ivorian footballer
- September 28 – Michael Ronda, Mexican actor and singer

=== October ===
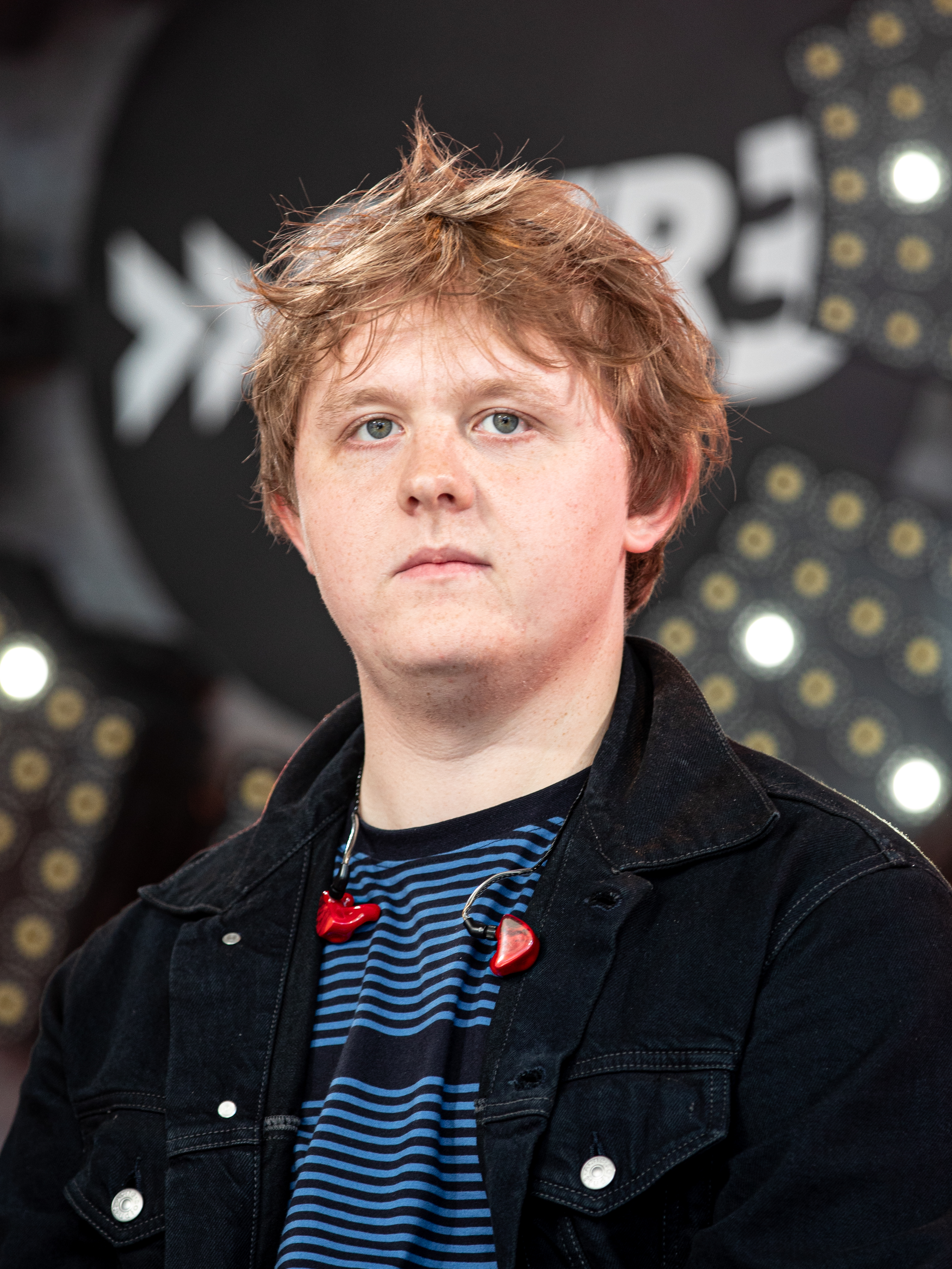
Lewis Capaldi

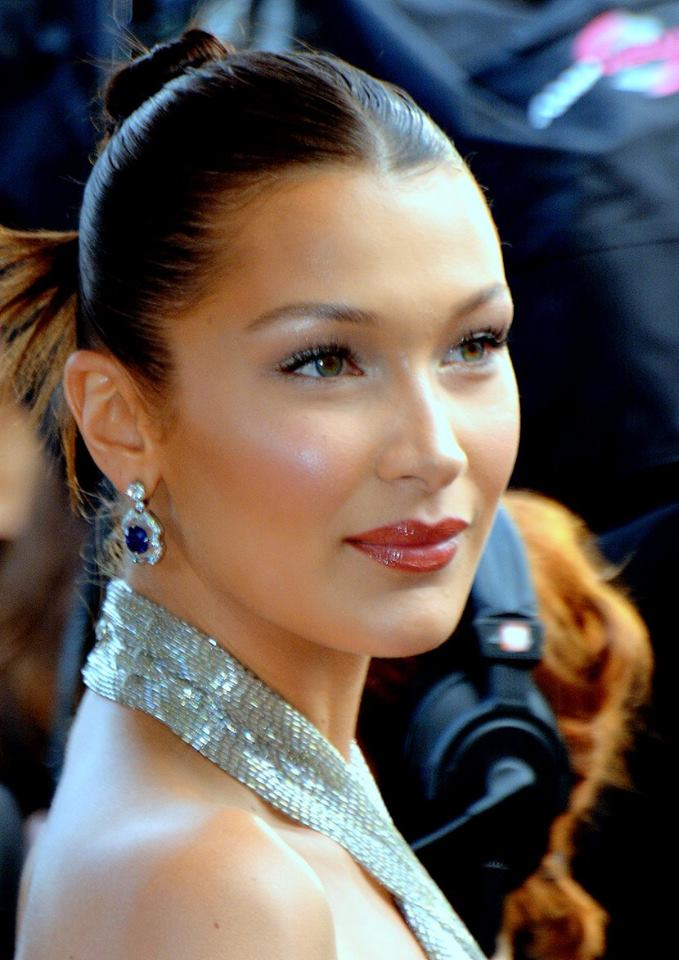
Bella Hadid

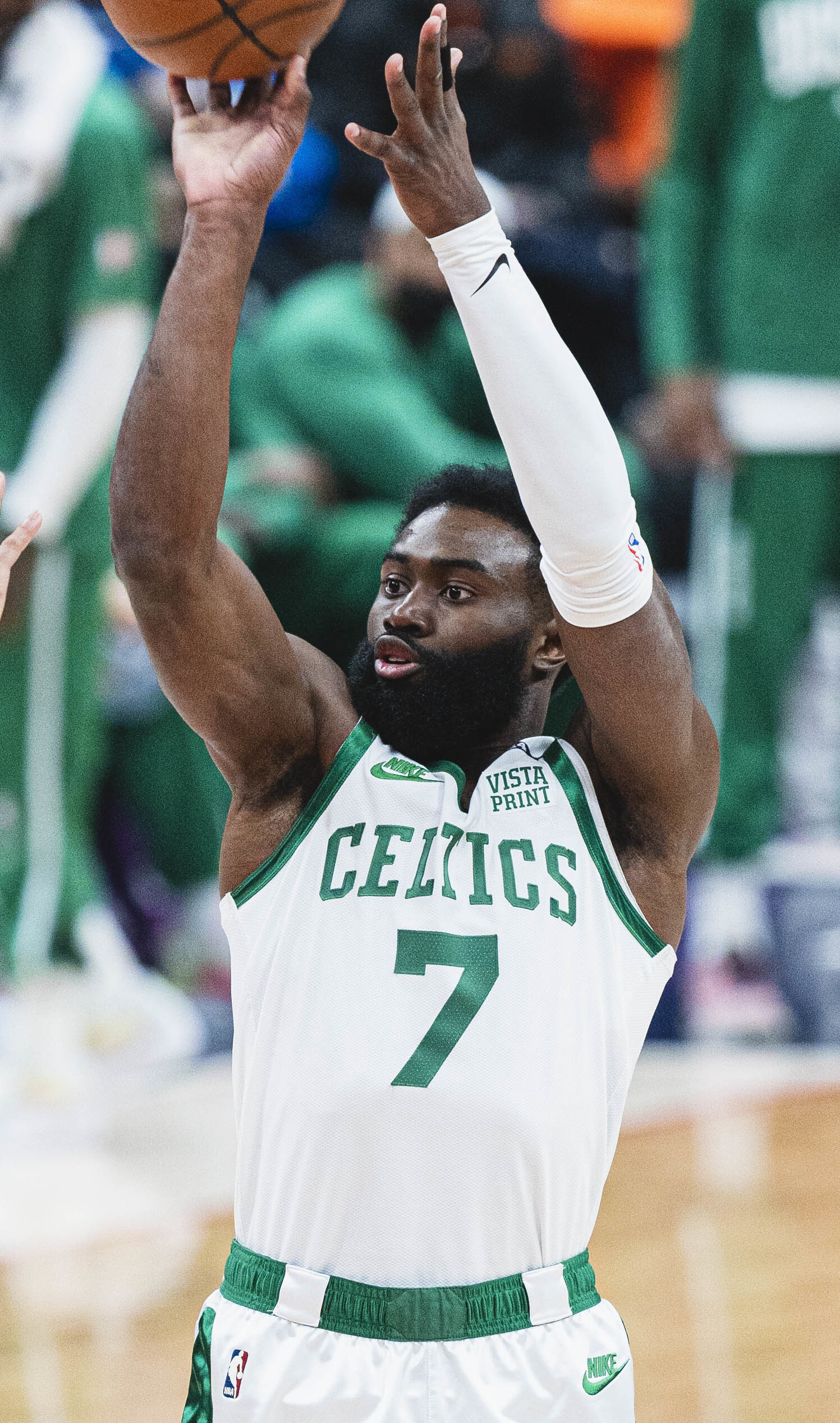
Jaylen Brown

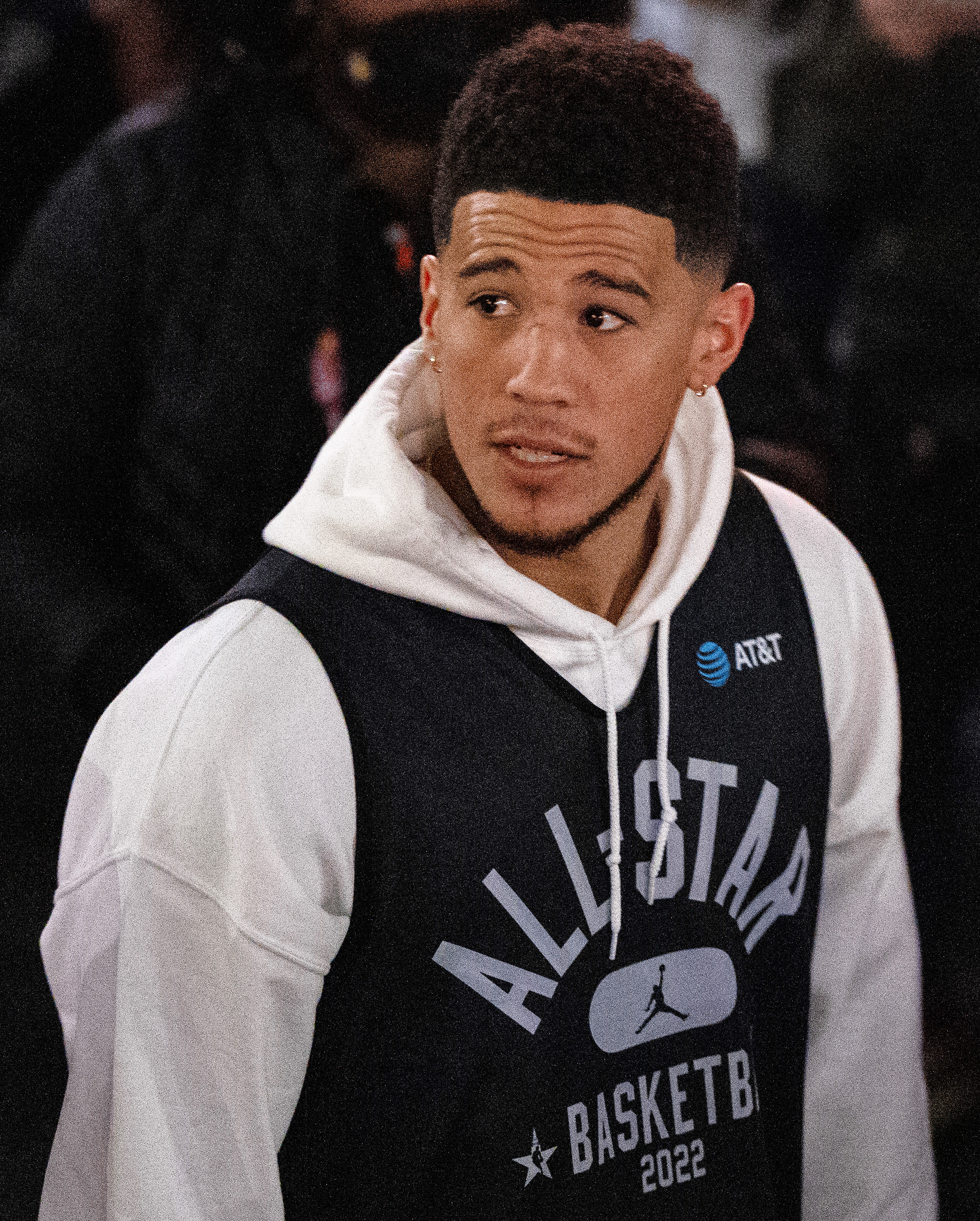
Devin Booker

- October 3 – Kelechi Iheanacho, Nigerian footballer
- October 4 – Ella Balinska, English actress
- October 7
  - Lewis Capaldi, Scottish singer-songwriter
  - Guglielmo Vicario, Italian footballer
- October 8 – Sara Takanashi, Japanese ski jumper
- October 9
  - Jacob Batalon, American-Filipino actor
  - Bella Hadid, American model
- October 10 – Oscar Zia, Swedish singer and songwriter
- October 12 – Vitória Strada, Brazilian actress
- October 13
  - Joshua Wong, Hong Kong student activist and politician
  - Đỗ Mỹ Linh, Vietnamese model
- October 17 – Cansu Özbay, Turkish volleyball player
- October 20
  - Anthony Sinisuka Ginting, Indonesian badminton player
  - Chance Perdomo, American actor (d. 2024)
- October 24
  - Jaylen Brown, American basketball player
  - Kyla Ross, American gymnast
- October 25 – Marileidy Paulino, Dominican sprinter
- October 27 – Samantha Logan, American actress
- October 28
  - Jack Eichel, American ice hockey player
- October 30 – Devin Booker, American basketball player

=== November ===
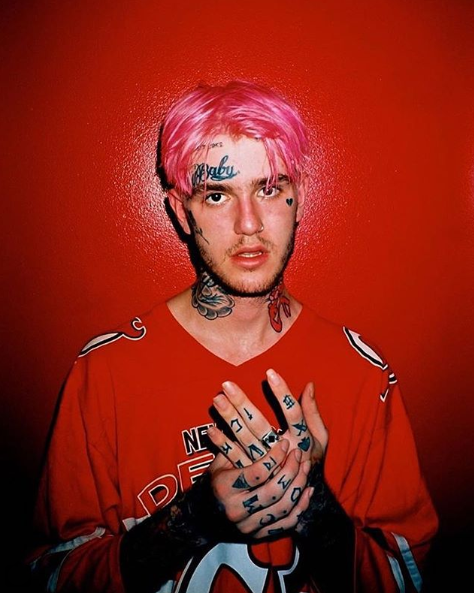
Lil Peep

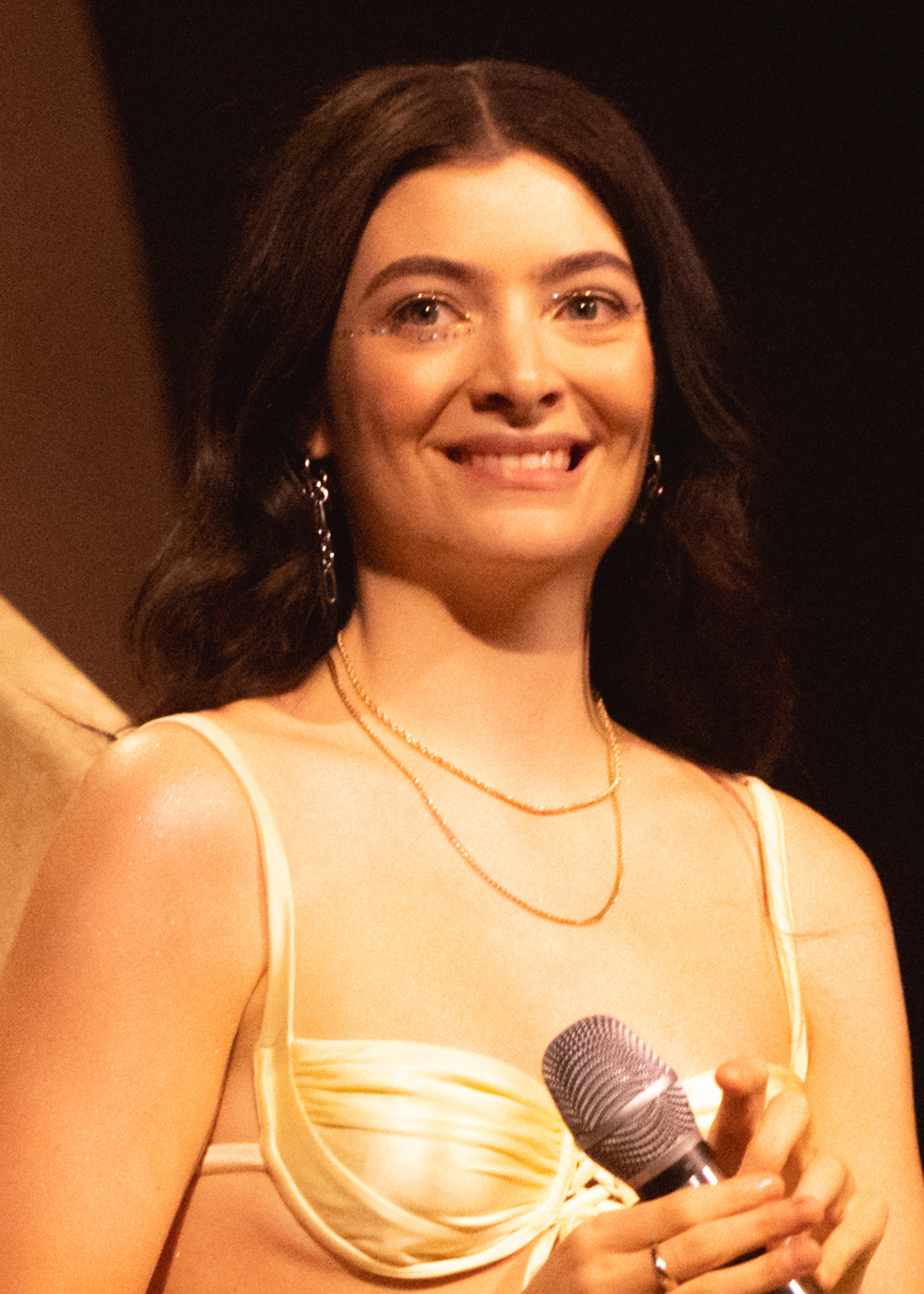
Lorde

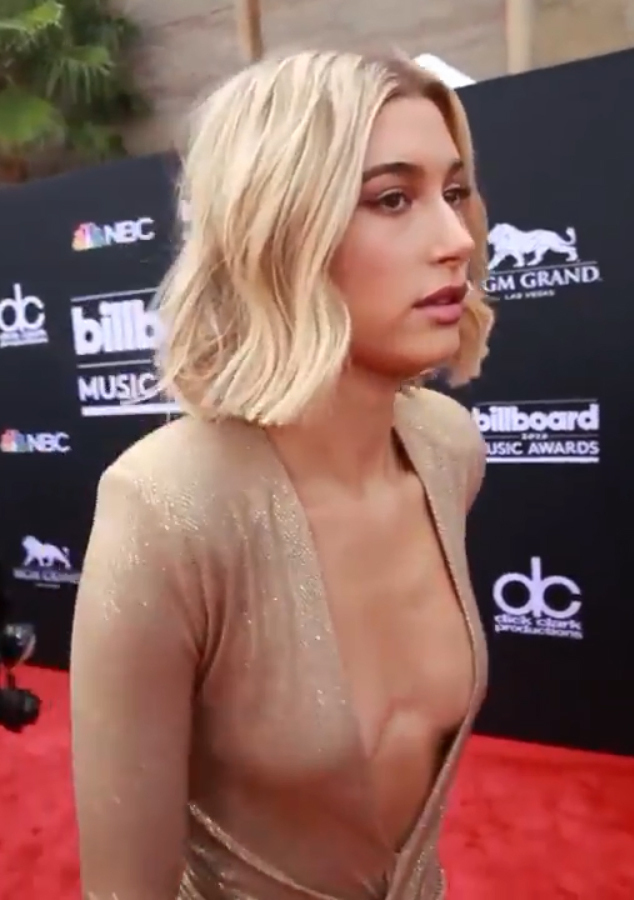
Hailey Bieber

- November 1
  - Lil Peep, American rapper (d. 2017)
  - Daniela Melchior, Portuguese actress
  - Jeongyeon, South Korean singer
- November 4 – Fivel Stewart, American actress
- November 7 – Lorde, New Zealand singer-songwriter
- November 9
  - Nguyễn Thị Ánh Viên, Vietnamese swimmer
  - Momo Hirai, Japanese singer and dancer
- November 11 – Robin Le Normand, Spanish footballer
- November 14 – Mason Gooding, American actor
- November 15 – Kim Min-jae, South Korean footballer
- November 16 – Jan Zieliński, Polish tennis player
- November 17 – Ruth Jebet, Bahraini long-distance runner
- November 18
  - Akram Afif, Qatari footballer
  - Sorn, South Korean-based singer
- November 19
  - Krystsina Tsimanouskaya, Belarusian sprinter
  - Fred Warner American football linebacker
- November 20 – Denis Zakaria, Swiss footballer
- November 21 – Gina Lückenkemper, German sprinter
- November 22 – Hailey Bieber, American model and socialite
- November 26 – Louane Emera, French singer and actress
- November 29 – Gonçalo Guedes, Portuguese footballer

=== December ===
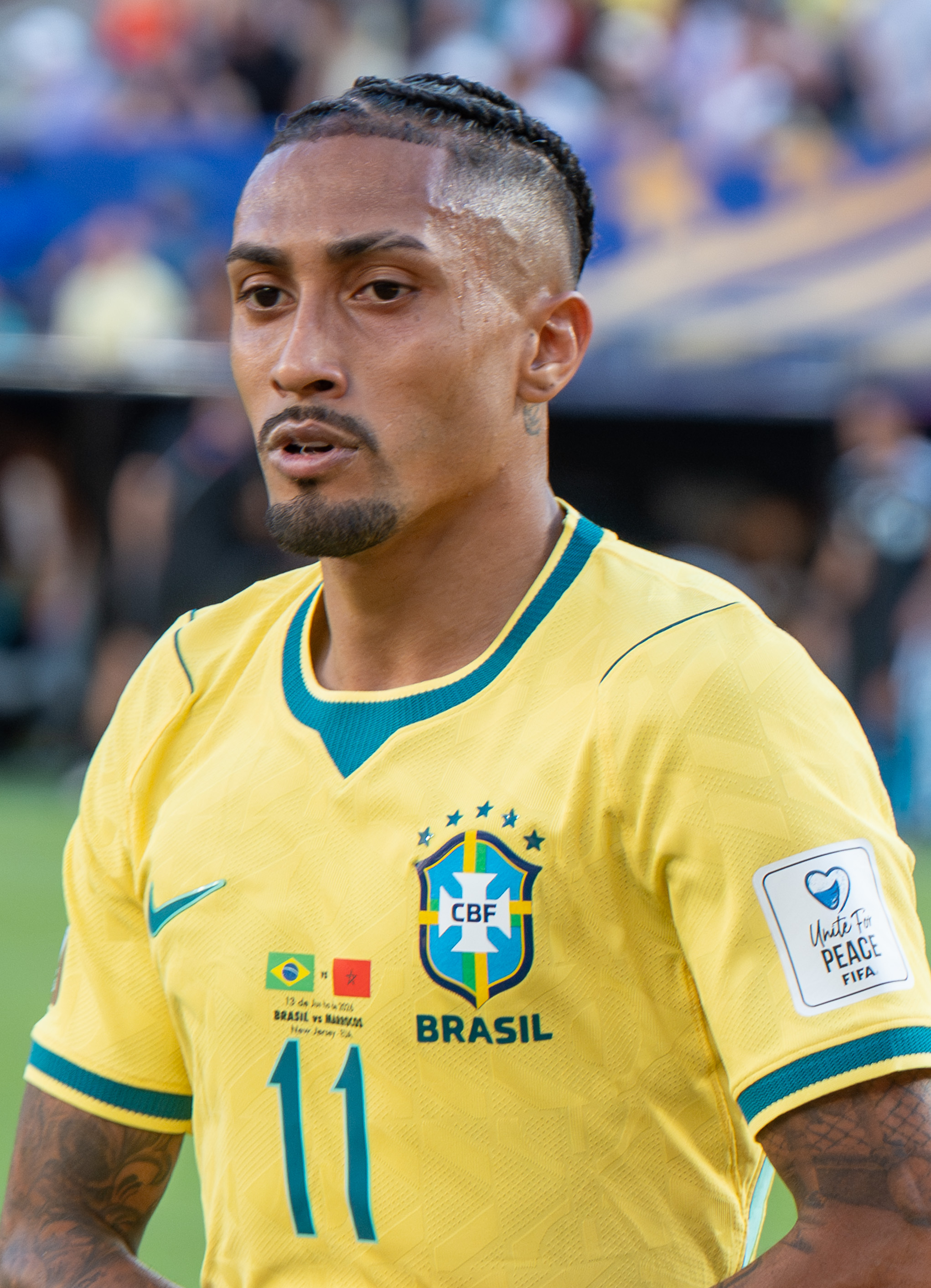
Raphinha

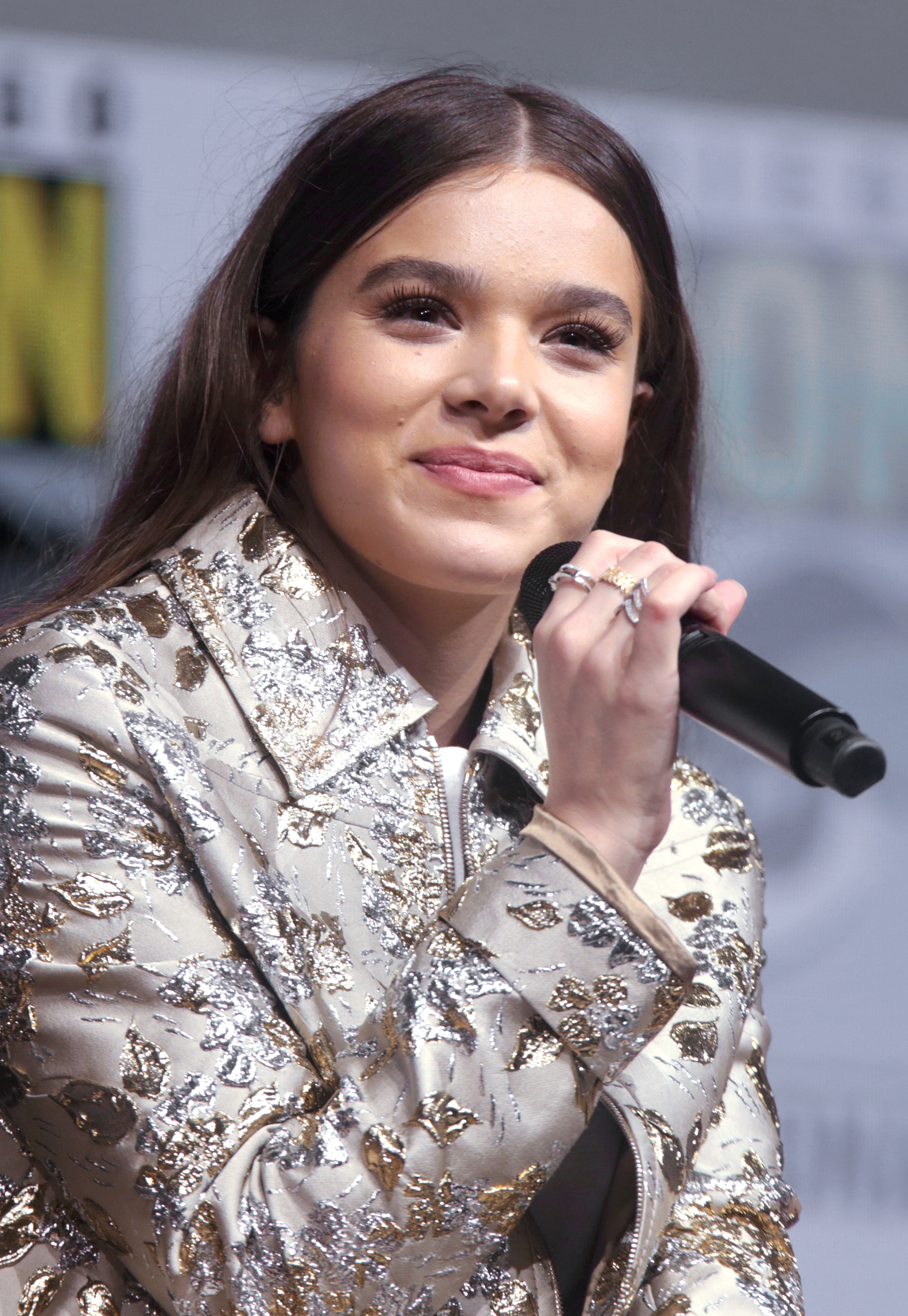
Hailee Steinfeld

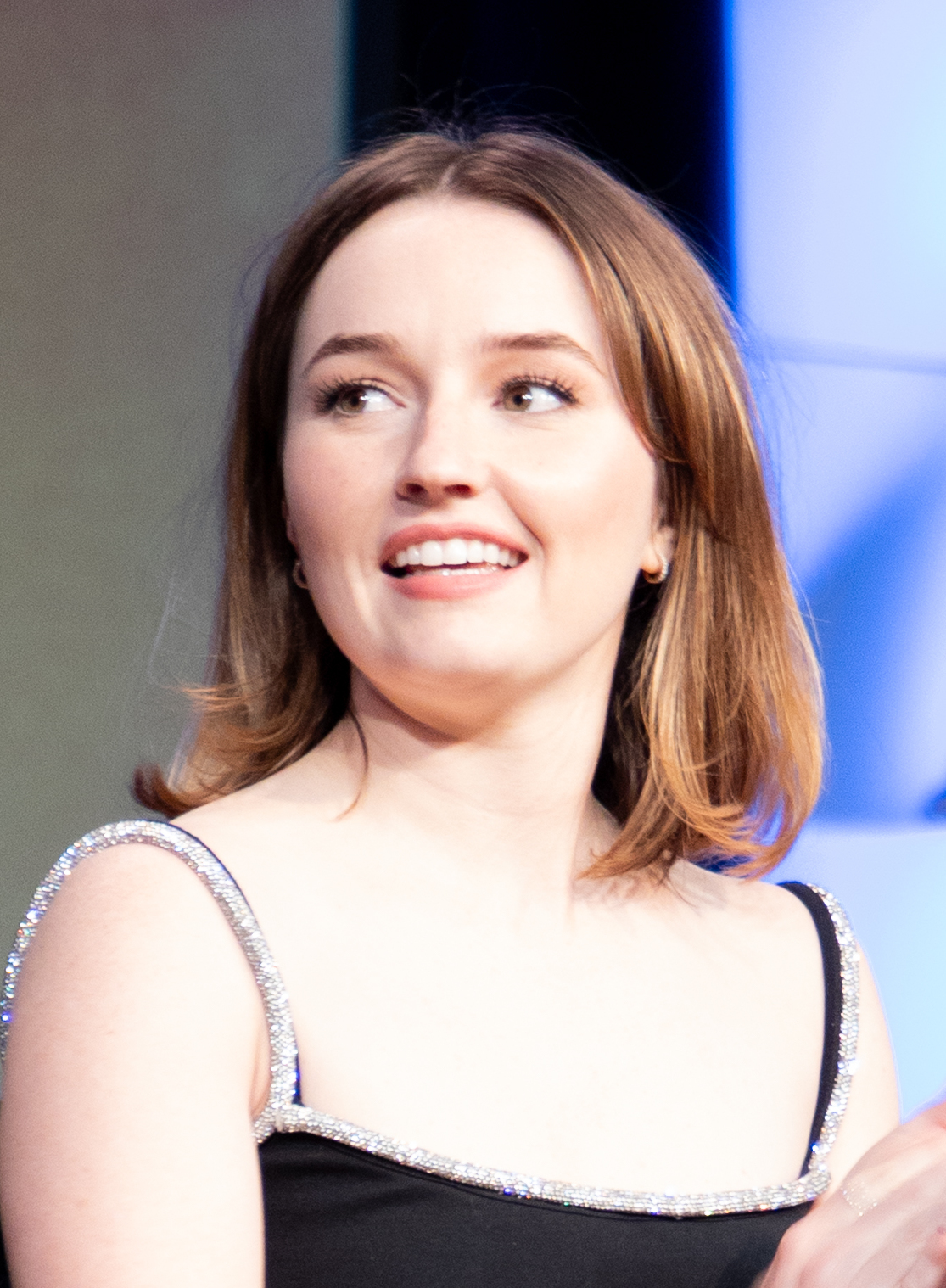
Kaitlyn Dever

- December 3 – Tigst Assefa, Ethiopian long-distance runner
- December 4
  - Daria Svatkovskaya, former Russian artistic gymnast
  - Diogo Jota, Portuguese footballer (d. 2025)
- December 6 – Stefanie Scott, American actress and singer
- December 7 – Gabrielle Thomas, American sprinter
- December 10
  - Kang Daniel, South Korean singer
  - Ayano Sato, Japanese speed skater
  - Jonas Vingegaard, Danish cyclist
- December 11 – Hailee Steinfeld, American actress, model and singer
- December 12 – Lucas Hedges, American actor
- December 14
  - Raphinha, Brazilian footballer
  - Barbie Ferreira, American actress and model
- December 15 – Oleksandr Zinchenko, Ukrainian footballer
- December 16 – Wilfred Ndidi, Nigerian footballer
- December 17 – Elizaveta Tuktamysheva, Russian figure skater
- December 19 – Franck Kessié, Ivorian footballer
- December 21 – Kaitlyn Dever, American actress
- December 28
  - Alfred Kipketer, Kenyan middle-distance runner
  - Nicola Olyslagers, Australian high jumper
- December 29
  - Dylan Minnette, American actor, singer and musician
  - Sana, Japanese singer

== Nobel Prizes ==

- Physics – David M. Lee, Douglas D. Osheroff, Robert C. Richardson
- Chemistry – Robert Curl, Sir Harold Kroto, Richard Smalley
- Medicine – Peter C. Doherty, Rolf M. Zinkernagel
- Literature – Wisława Szymborska
- Peace – Carlos Filipe Ximenes Belo and José Ramos-Horta
- Bank of Sweden Prize in Economic Sciences in Memory of Alfred Nobel – James Mirrlees, William Vickrey
