= The Starling Girl (soundtrack) =

Music from the Starling Girl

Film score by Ben Schneider
- Released: June 21, 2023
- Recorded: 2023
- Genre: Film score
- Length: 31:58
- Label: Republic
- Producer: Ben Schneider

Singles from Music from the Starling Girl
- 1. "Ace Up My Sleeve" Released: May 19, 2023

Music from the Starling Girl is the film score soundtrack to the 2023 film The Starling Girl written and directed by Laurel Parmet in her feature directorial debut, stars Eliza Scanlen, Lewis Pullman, Jimmi Simpson, Wrenn Schmidt, and Austin Abrams. The score is written, composed and produced by Ben Schneider of the indie folk band Lord Huron while the band was credited for the soundtrack. The album was preceded by the first single "Ace Up My Sleeve" which released on May 19, 2023, and the 14-track album was released on June 21, 2023, under the Republic Records label.

== Background ==
The film score is composed by Ben Schneider of the indie folk band Lord Huron in his feature film debut. He was approached through the connections of producer Kevin Rowe. After meeting director Laurel Parmet before the pandemic, he was intrigued by the film's coming-of-age narrative set against a conservative Christian backdrop and was excited that the film's music would play an integral role in the storyline, making the project particularly appealing. Throughout the creative process, Schneider enjoyed a collaborative relationship with Parmet approaching her input while also exercising creative freedom and tried to align the musical contributions matching with Parmet's vision leading to a back-and-forth exchange of ideas and sounds.

After reading the script, he composed few cues that complemented the tone and emotional depth. In his maiden film scoring experience, Schneider attributed the difficulties of interpreting the creative intentions of another person, but Parmet's freedom facilitated a productive collaboration. He wanted to express the narrative in an unexplicit manner, to garner musical authenticity, he sought out to emulate country rock sounds from the 1990s, which he did using analog equipment and live recordings, which in turn allowed him to inhabit the father's character. While watching the finished film, he complimented the nuanced portrayal of relationships, particularly on how the protagonist's perceptions shift throughout the story in a more subtle manner. This subtlety being further inhibited in the screenplay adding more depth to the filmmaking process.

== Release ==
On May 19, 2023, the band Lord Huron shared the song "Ace Up My Sleeve" as a digital single through music platforms. The soundtrack was released on June 21, coinciding with World Music Day and published through Republic Records.

== Track listing ==
| No. | Title | Length |
|---|---|---|
| 1. | "Stained Glass" | 1:19 |
| 2. | "Warm Night" | 1:43 |
| 3. | "Deadbeats Jam Tape Winter '94" | 2:49 |
| 4. | "Tunnel of Trees" | 1:17 |
| 5. | "Jem's Theme" | 4:00 |
| 6. | "Fill Me to the Brim" | 1:36 |
| 7. | "Deadbeats Jam Tape Winter '95" | 2:43 |
| 8. | "Evening Ride" | 1:20 |
| 9. | "Summer Air" | 1:38 |
| 10. | "Hands to Sky" | 2:45 |
| 11. | "Mysteries" | 2:35 |
| 12. | "Overflowing" | 1:47 |
| 13. | "Jem's Theme" (Reprise) | 2:36 |
| 14. | "Ace Up My Sleeve" | 3:50 |
| Total length: | | 31:58 |

== Reception ==
Jourdain Searles of The Hollywood Reporter described the score "lovely", while Peter Debruge of Variety and Natalia Winkelman of The New York Times considered it to be "tender" and "poignant".

== Release history ==
| Region | Date | Format(s) | Label(s) | Ref. |
|---|---|---|---|---|
| Various | June 21, 2023 | Digital download; streaming | Republic Records | |
| Various | January 12, 2024 | LP | Republic Records | |
