= Page Fifty-Four Pictures =

Entertainment production company in the United States

- Company type: Private
- Industry: Entertainment
- Founded: 2018
- Founder: Alex Saks
- Headquarters: United States
- Services: Film production

Page Fifty-Four Pictures is an American independent entertainment production company founded by Alex Saks, located in Los Angeles, California. It specializes in film production, and film finance.

== History ==
In 2018, Alex Saks launched Page Fifty-Four Pictures a production and film finance company, following the shuttering of her previous company June Pictures.

The company has produced The Glorias a biographical film about Gloria Steinem, directed by Julie Taymor, starring Julianne Moore and Alicia Vikander, El Tonto directed by Charlie Day, and Chemical Hearts directed by Richard Tanne.

== Filmography ==
Year	Title	Notes
2020	The Glorias	distributed by Roadside Attractions and LD Entertainment
2020	Chemical Hearts	distributed by Amazon Studios
2022	Mack & Rita	distributed by Gravitas Premiere
2023	Fool's Paradise	distributed by Roadside Attractions
