= Stephen James Taylor =

American composer (born 1954)

- Born: September 28, 1954 (age 71); Los Angeles, California, United States
- Genres: Film score, electronica, trip hop, jazz, worldbeat
- Occupation: Composer
- Instruments: Guitars, keyboards, homemade instruments, programming, bass, drums, string arrangements
- Years active: 1978 – present
- Website: http://www.stephenjamestaylor.com

Stephen James Taylor (born September 28, 1954) is an American composer best known for his film and TV scores. He has earned four Emmy nominations, two Annie nominations, and a DVD-X Award on "Best Original Score (for a DVD Premiere Movie) to date ('05).

== Family background ==
Stephen James Taylor was born in Los Angeles, the middle of five children to James Brainard and Jane Carolyn (Johnson) Taylor. His parents were both educators. His father was a math teacher who became one of the first Black principals in the Los Angeles Unified School District. His mother taught Spanish in secondary school and in Adult Education classes. She was also an accomplished pianist, organist, and vocal coach. Taylor's uncle (Jane's brother) was Tommy Johnson a "first call" studio musician who played tuba on over 2,000 recordings including the soundtrack to Jaws.

== Unusual notes ==
One of the ways he achieves his sound is by working with a larger palette of notes rather than those allowed on conventional instruments. He introduced microtonality to the vocabulary of film music with his score for The Giving composed solely using a scale with 58 tones per octave, unequal. Other Taylor scores incorporating microtonal cues include Why Do Fools Fall in Love, Gregory Nava, The Lion King's Timon & Pumbaa, Mickey Mouse Works, The Final Insult, Powers of Time, A Question of Faith, The Glass Shield, Black Panther, The Eames Aluminum Chair, and A Gathering of Elephants.

== Filmography ==
Taylor has written the scores to most of the feature films of Charles Burnett including To Sleep with Anger, The Glass Shield, Selma, Lord, Selma, Oprah Winfrey's The Wedding, and Namibia: The Struggle for Liberation, for which he won best score at the Kuala Lumpur International Film Festival. For director Robert Townsend, he has scored several projects including Holiday Heart for Showtime and Phantom Punch. He also composed the score for Richard Tanne's 2016 feature debut, Southside with You, which dramatizes the first date between President Barack Obama and his future wife, Michelle Robinson. Additionally, he scored Tanne's 2020 follow-up, Chemical Hearts, for Amazon Studios. Other credits include the HBO film, Boycott, directed by Clark Johnson, the 2004 Disney animated theatrical release Teacher's Pet, as well as a number of television, cable and direct to video movies including the 2016 documentary Maya Angelou and Still I Rise.

== Television ==
His prime time music career began in 1981 when he joined the composing team of Mike Post and Pete Carpenter writing and orchestrating for such shows as Greatest American Hero, The A-Team, Magnum, P.I. and Hunter. He co-wrote the theme to ABC’s Gideon Oliver in 1988 and in 1993 he was hired by David Chase (who later went on to create and produce The Sopranos) to write the music for the 2nd season of NBC's I'll Fly Away resulting in Taylor's 2nd Emmy nomination. Another network show was Under One Roof for which he wrote the main title song and underscore for the first few episodes. This CBS show was the last primetime black family show on a major, non-cable network.

== Commissions ==
In 1996, he was commissioned to write and conduct an orchestral suite, with Mark Watters, for the Atlanta Symphony to perform at the Opening Ceremonies for the Olympics for which he received a BMI Olympic Tribute Award. In 2007, he was also hired to create world music for the lobby of the World of Coca-Cola museum in Atlanta as well as do some surround sound design for one of the permanent installations there.

== Animation ==
Taylor’s experience in writing music for animation began with Hanna Barbera and Ruby-Spears in 1980, runs through Spielberg's Tiny Toon Adventures in 1990 and several series for Disney TV animation in the 1990s such as Jungle Cubs and Raw Toonage, up through the present with the recent release of the Black Panther for Marvel. He was hired in 1991 to write a new theme for G.I. Joe: A Real American Hero, for which he also provided the score for 2 seasons. He composed the underscore and main title song for all 3 years of Mickey Mouse Works (later incorporated into the newer show, House of Mouse) with a 12 piece band that included homemade instruments and fretless guitar. This show represented the first time the core Disney characters (Mickey et al.) had been animated for television in 50 years. In 2006, he composed The Adventures of Brer Rabbit.

== Study ==
He received a bachelor's degree in music composition from Stanford University, after which he continued his studies in classical composition and conducting privately with Henri Lazarof, Dr. Albert Harris (composer), and microtonality with Erv Wilson. As a "music oriented content provider", he has redefined himself as a 21st-century composer/artist.
