= Austin Abrams =

American actor (born 1996)

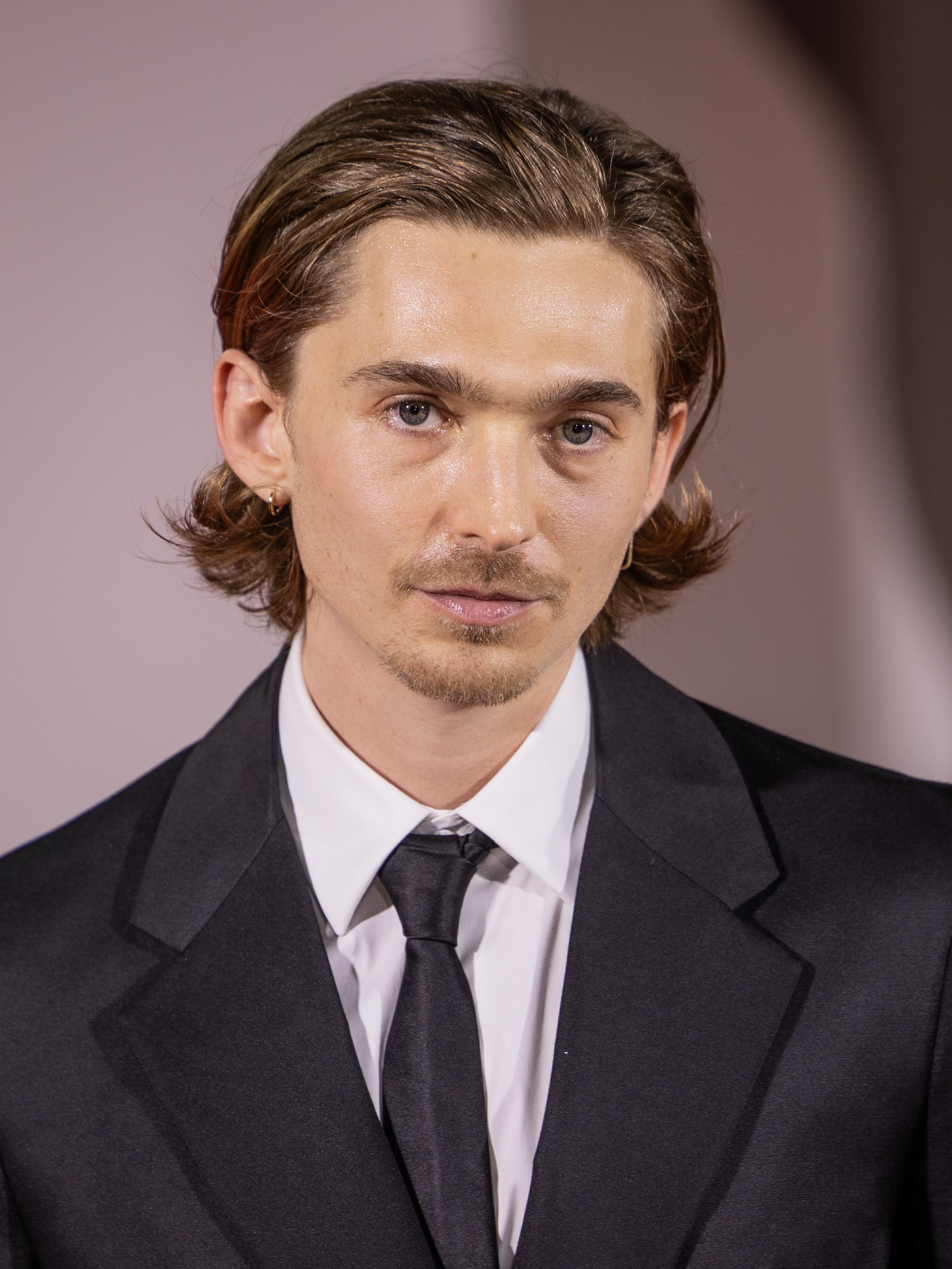
- Abrams in 2024
- Born: Austin Noah Abrams; September 2, 1996 (age 30); Sarasota, Florida, U.S.
- Occupation: Actor
- Years active: 2011–present

Austin Noah Abrams (born September 2, 1996) is an American actor. He has had lead roles in films such as Brad's Status (2017), Chemical Hearts (2020), Do Revenge (2022), Whalefall (2026), and Resident Evil (2026), as well as supporting roles in The Kings of Summer (2013), Paper Towns (2015), Tragedy Girls (2017), Scary Stories to Tell in the Dark (2019), The Starling Girl (2023), Wolfs (2024), and Weapons (2025).

In television, Abrams played Todd Cooper on the MTV sitcom The Inbetweeners (2012), Ron Anderson in the post-apocalyptic horror drama series The Walking Dead (2015–2016), young Marc McKeon in the comedy drama series This Is Us (2019–2021), and Dash in the romantic comedy series Dash & Lily (2020). He starred as Ethan Daley in the psychological teen drama series Euphoria (2019–2022).

For his performance as Gettys O'Brien in the coming-of-age drama film The Line (2023), Abrams won the Rising Star Award at the Sarasota Film Festival.

== Early life ==
Abrams was raised in Sarasota, Florida, and is the son of Lori and Bradley Abrams, who are doctors. He has a younger sister who is also an actress. He is of paternal Jewish descent. Abrams began taking acting lessons when he was five years old, and started appearing in theater productions at the age of nine.

== Career ==
=== 2010s ===
Abrams made his feature film debut in the mystery action thriller film Ticking Clock in 2011. He made his television debut in MTV's The Inbetweeners portraying Todd Cooper. In the same year, Abrams played the role of young version of Joel David Moore's character Adam Lipschitz in the comedy movie Jewtopia, which was released on April 26, 2012.

In 2013, Abrams appeared in the action thriller movie Gangster Squad directed by Ruben Fleischer, based on a non-fiction book by Paul Lieberman. In the same year, he appeared in the coming-of-age comedy-drama film The Kings of Summer, where he played the role of Aaron. In 2014, Abrams starred in the thriller drama film Sacrifice, which premiered at the Woodstock Film Festival in October 2014. He had a recurring role as Ron Anderson in the AMC television series The Walking Dead during its fifth and sixth seasons. In 2015, Abrams appeared in a supporting role in Jake Schreier's romantic comedy-drama film Paper Towns, based on the 2008 novel of the same name by John Green.

In 2017, Abrams co-starred in Kyle Wilamowski's film All Summers End, playing Hunter Gorski, a scruffy 16-year-old who pays little attention to his best friend Conrad's first love. On the same year, he starred in Brad's Status, a comedy-drama movie by Mike White, playing Troy Sloan. He took on a supporting roles in the films Tragedy Girls and We Don't Belong Here. In 2018, Abrams appeared as James in Dude, a coming-of-age comedy-drama film by Olivia Milch (2018), released on Netflix. In the same year, he appeared in the drama film Puzzle directed by Marc Turtletaub, based on the 2010 Argentine film of the same name. The film had its world premiere at the Sundance Film Festival on January 23, 2018, and was released in the United States on July 27, 2018.

In 2019, Abrams was cast as Ethan Daley in the teen drama series Euphoria, created by Sam Levinson. Abrams had a major role in the 2019 horror book adaptation Scary Stories to Tell in the Dark. The film, directed by André Øvredal and based on the book series of the same name by Alvin Schwartz, was theatrically released on August 9, 2019, by Lionsgate Films. Abrams had a recurring role in the TV series This Is Us, playing Marc McKeon, Kate's abusive ex-boyfriend.

=== 2020s ===
In early 2020, Abrams starred as Henry Page in the teen romance film Chemical Hearts directed by Richard Tanne, based on the novel Our Chemical Hearts by Krystal Sutherland. The film was released on August 21, 2020, by Amazon Studios. Abrams was cast to play a lead role in the Netflix romantic comedy series Dash & Lily. The series, based on the young adult novel series Dash & Lily's Book of Dares by David Levithan and Rachel Cohn, premiered on Netflix on November 10, 2020.

In 2022, Abrams played the role of Max Broussard in the teen comedy film Do Revenge directed by Jennifer Kaytin Robinson. It was released on Netflix on September 16, 2022. In 2023, Abrams portrayed Ben Taylor in the coming-of-age drama film The Starling Girl, directed by Laurel Parmet. The film premiered at the Sundance Film Festival on January 21, 2023, and was released theatrically on May 12, 2023. In the same year, Abrams appeared in the drama film The Line, directed by Ethan Berger, which was released on June 9, 2023, at the Tribeca Festival.

In 2024, Abrams starred in the action comedy film Wolfs, directed by Jon Watts.

In 2025, Abrams appeared in Zach Cregger's horror film Weapons as James, a thieving drug addict who gets involved in the mystery of a group of disappeared schoolchildren. He was initially cast in 2023 alongside other actors, but production was interrupted by the 2023 Hollywood labor disputes; Abrams was the only original cast member to remain attached to the film.

After being impressed by Abrams on the set of Weapons, Cregger cast him as the lead for his next film, Resident Evil. Abrams plays Bryan, a medical courier who must fight for survival against a viral outbreak of infected monsters. That same year, Abrams starred as Jay Gardiner in Whalefall (2026), a survival thriller about one man's encounter with a massive sperm whale.

== Filmography ==
=== Film ===
Year	Title	Role	Notes
2010	Gone to the Moon	Martin	Short Film
2011	Ticking Clock	James	
2012	Jewtopia	Young Adam Lipschitz	
2013	Gangster Squad	Pete	
2013	The Kings of Summer	Aaron	
2015	Sacrifice	Tim	
2015	Paper Towns	Ben Starling	
2017	All Summers End	Hunter Gorski	
2017	Brad's Status	Troy Sloan	
2017	Tragedy Girls	Craig Thompson	
2017	We Don't Belong Here	Davey	
2018	Dude	James	
2018	Puzzle	Gabe	
2019	Scary Stories to Tell in the Dark	Tommy Milner	
2020	Chemical Hearts	Henry Page	
2022	Do Revenge	Max Broussard	
2023	The Starling Girl	Ben Taylor	
2023	The Line	Gettys O'Brien	
2024	Wolfs	The Kid	
2025	Weapons	James	
2026	Resident Evil	Bryan Hodukavich	
2026	Whalefall	Jay Gardiner	

=== Television ===
Year	Title	Role	Notes
2012	The Inbetweeners	Todd Cooper	Recurring role
2014	Shameless	Henry McNally	Episode: "Emily"
2014	Silicon Valley	The Carver	Episode: "Third Party Insourcing"
2015–2016	The Walking Dead	Ron Anderson	Recurring role (seasons 5–6)
2017	SMILF	Casey	Episodes: "1,800 Filet-O-Fishes & One Small Diet Coke" and "Mark's Lunch & Two Cups Of Coffee"
2018	The Americans	Jackson Barber	Episodes: "Rififi" and "The Summit"
2019–2021	This Is Us	Young Marc McKeon	Recurring role (seasons 4–5)
2019–2022	Euphoria	Ethan Daley	Recurring role (season 1); main role (season 2)
2020	Dash & Lily	Dash	Main role
2024	Penelope	Sam	Episode: "One”
