= Our Chemical Hearts =

2016 young adult novel by Krystal Sutherland

- First edition
- Author: Krystal Sutherland
- Language: English
- Genre: Young adult novel
- Publisher: Hot Key Books
- Publication date: 2016
- Media type: Print (hardback & paperback)
- Pages: 336 (paperback)

Our Chemical Hearts is a teen drama young adult novel written by Australian author Krystal Sutherland. The book was named by The American Bookseller Association as one of the best debuts of 2016. A 2020 film adaptation starring Lili Reinhart and Austin Abrams was produced by Amazon Studios. The book was shortlisted for the Indie Book Award in 2017.

== Premise ==
Our Chemical Hearts is the story of Henry Page, a teenage student who considers himself a hopeless romantic but has never fallen in love. The young man aspires to be editor of the high school newspaper, and lives happily focused on his studies to enter a good university until Grace Town enters his class. She is not exactly the girl of his dreams, but little by little he falls in love with her when the two teenagers are chosen to edit the school newspaper together.

== Film adaptation ==
In June 2016, Awesomeness Films acquired the screen rights to Our Chemical Hearts. A film adaptation, Chemical Hearts, was produced by Amazon Studios and released on August 21, 2020. It stars Lili Reinhart and Austin Abrams as Grace Town and Henry Page. Sutherland herself served as an executive producer on the project while Richard Tanne directed and wrote the screenplay.
