= All Summers End =

2017 drama film directed

- Film poster
- Directed by: Kyle Wilamowski
- Written by: Kyle Wilamowski
- Produced by: Kevin Mann; Steve Olivera; Matthew Perniciaro; Michael Sherman
- Starring: Tye Sheridan; Kaitlyn Dever; Austin Abrams; Beau Mirchoff; Paula Malcomson; Annabeth Gish; Ryan Lee
- Cinematography: Wyatt Garfield
- Edited by: Michael P. Shawver
- Music by: Joel P. West
- Production companies: Haven Entertainment; Deckplate Films; American Film Productions; Bow and Arrow Entertainment; Painstaking Pictures
- Distributed by: Gravitas Ventures
- Release dates: February 6, 2017 (Santa Barbara International Film Festival); June 1, 2018
- Country: United States
- Language: English

All Summers End is a 2017 American romantic drama film directed and written by Kyle Wilamowski. The film stars Tye Sheridan, Kaitlyn Dever, Austin Abrams, Beau Mirchoff, Paula Malcomson and Annabeth Gish.

== Plot ==
Conrad, Hunter and Tim are close friends living in a small town. Grace takes a liking to Conrad and they start spending a lot of time with each other, which stresses Conrad's relationship with Hunter and Tim. Having promised Hunter and Tim that they could hang out on the 4th of July, Conrad declines an invitation to watch the fireworks with Grace's family.

The three boys drive around the town stealing garden ornaments and Conrad – on a dare – goes to steal a plant from the porch of Grace's house. Unbeknownst to them, Grace had earlier had a fight with her brother Eric, who has consequently stayed home while Grace and her parents went to see the fireworks.

The boys are nearly caught and Eric gets in his car, chasing them to the outskirts of the town. The boys narrowly avoid a deer that wanders onto the road, but Eric hits it and crashes into a tree. The boys argue about whether to call for help, as he is still breathing. Hunter and Tim vote to leave, hoping someone would pass by soon, and, feeling pressured, Conrad decides to leave too.

The next day, the news spreads through the town that Eric has died from his injuries. Grace is riddled with guilt due to her fight with Eric and finds comfort in Conrad, who has fallen out with Tim and Hunter due to their refusal to help Eric at the scene of the accident.

Conrad tries to tell Grace the truth but is interrupted by her parents. As Grace finds comfort in Conrad, they become closer. On the night that Grace's parents go away to Eric's college to pack up his dorm room, she loses her virginity to Conrad.

Grace leaves to go to church the next morning, telling Conrad that he would have the house to himself, but her parents return early. Grace's parents discover the discarded condom wrapper and, feeling betrayed, tell Conrad to leave.

Grace has a fight with her parents and goes to look for Conrad, finding him in an abandoned house he had shown her earlier. Conrad, now in distress, confesses the truth to Grace and she leaves, telling him that she never wants to see him again. Conrad goes home and tells his mother what had happened. Following this talk, he goes to see Grace's parents to tell them the truth and return the plant.

It is revealed that Conrad never did get back in touch with Grace and hopes she's okay wherever she is. An adult Conrad eventually marries and has a son, whom he names Eric.

== Cast ==
- Tye Sheridan as Conrad Stevens, Grace's love interest
  - Pablo Schreiber as Older Conrad Stevens
- Kaitlyn Dever as Grace Turner, Conrad's love interest
- Austin Abrams as Hunter Gorski, Conrad's friend
- Ryan Lee as Timmy, Conrad's other friend
- Paula Malcomson as Mrs. Stevens, Conrad's mother
- Annabeth Gish as Mrs. Turner, Grace's mother
- Bill Sage as Mr. Turner, Grace's father
- Beau Mirchoff as Eric Turner. Grace's deceased brother

== Production ==
The film was shot in North Carolina in July 2013 under the title Grass Stains.

== Release ==
In April 2018, Gravitas Ventures picked up North American distribution rights for the film, retitled All Summers End, and set the film's release date for June 1, 2018.

== Reception ==
On Rotten Tomatoes, All Summers End has an approval rating of 20% based on five reviews (one positive review and four negative), with an average rating of 3.50/10. In a positive review, Stephen Farber of The Hollywood Reporter wrote, "the resolution seems honest and mature, and a brief epilogue is so powerful that it makes us forget some of the film's earlier lapses. The emotionally devastating last line socks the whole movie home." Robert Abele of the Los Angeles Times, however, was critical of the film's dramatic structure, writing "Writer-director Kyle Wilamowski smothers his bid for nuanced emotion in the cardboard mechanics of bad-decision drama."
