= Ticking Clock =

- DVD cover
- Directed by: Ernie Barbarash
- Written by: John Turman
- Produced by: Brad Krevoy; Todd Williams
- Starring: Cuba Gooding Jr. Neal McDonough; Nicki Aycox; Austin Abrams; Yancey Arias; Dane Rhodes; Danielle Nicolet; Adrianne Frost
- Cinematography: Phil Parmet
- Edited by: Tricia Gorman
- Music by: Richard Friedman
- Production companies: Motion Picture Corporation of America; Upload Films
- Distributed by: Sony Pictures Home Entertainment
- Release date: January 4, 2011
- Running time: 101 minutes
- Country: United States
- Language: English
- Budget: $5.1 million

Ticking Clock is a 2011 American mystery action thriller film directed by Ernie Barbarash. The film stars Cuba Gooding Jr., with a supporting cast of Neal McDonough, Nicki Aycox and Austin Abrams. The film was released on direct-to-DVD in the United States on January 4, 2011.

== Plot ==
After killing a woman and cutting her open, Keech calms her crying baby boy.

Investigative reporter Louis has a rocky marriage to Gina, a girlfriend named Felecia, and a slumping career. District Attorney Felicia tells Louis she is ending the relationship. Later that day Keech murders Felicia in her home. Louis fights Keech who drops a book and escapes. The book is Keech's journal. Louis sees two more murders scheduled in the next three days. He writes the two names down, but Keech steals back the journal and the note.

Louis tries to tell the police but instead he becomes a suspect in Felicia's murder. Louis tracks down a scheduled murder victim, school teacher Vicki. He asks her out, but she goes to a bar. There, Keech talks with her about a boy she reported for abusing a cat. Vicki leaves for the restroom but Keech follows and murders her. Louis traces Vicki to the bar but finds her murdered.

The police still doubt his story. Louis' only evidence is a torn piece of Keech's coat, and a bloody fingerprint on a newspaper clipping. He sends both to a friend at a local crime lab. She tells him the blood matched an 11-year-old orphan living in a boys' home. The unfamiliar fabric of the coat reacts strangely to heat.

Boy's home Director Polly tells Louis the boy, James, has behavioral problems. James describes his wish to travel back in time to fix his life. James shows Louis a box with small animals that are dead and cut open. Lewis is shocked and James, feeling betrayed, starts yelling, sending Louis away.

Tracing the evidence, Louis realizes that Polly is the next woman on the list. Louis deduces that Keech is James, having traveled back from the future to "fix his life." The police do not believe this and jail Louis. Keech pretends to be Louis' lawyer, and reveals to Louis that he is James from the year 2032 coming back to fix his life, using a pocket watch time machine. James transports Louis and himself to the boys' home. Polly is tied up on the roof.

Keech threatens to kill Polly and forces Louis to bring James. Louis hides James in a restroom. Keech tells Louis he killed his abusive mother (the woman from the first scene) with the intention of changing his traumatic childhood. However, he further reveals that each change has simply resulted in another change, relentlessly steering Keech to his original horrific past: his teacher's actions condemned him to a similar fate, and after killing his teacher, a prosecuting attorney repeated the cycle, and now Polly will ultimately condemn James (young Keech) to yet another grim fate. Keech believes that by killing Polly, framing Lewis for the crime, and arranging for James to "capture" Louis and be hailed a hero, Keech can finally break the cycle and assure his younger self a happy future.

Unknown to either man, James has followed Louis, and interrupts the confrontation to ask Keech if he is his father. Keech says he is his future self. James is upset that Keech plans to hurt Polly, stating she has been nice to him, but Keech says she will send him to a mental hospital.

Keech drops a futuristic knife and James grabs it, slashing Keech's leg. Keech accidentally knocks James off of the roof and shoots Louis in the chest. Keech disappears as James dies from the fall.

Louis drives home. Since James died at age 11 he never became Keech, the serial killer. Each victim is shown alive including James, back with his mother again.

== Cast ==
- Cuba Gooding Jr. as Louis Hicks
- Neal McDonough as Keech
- Nicki Aycox as Polly
- Austin Abrams as James
- Yancey Arias as Detective Ed Beker
- Dane Rhodes as Detective Gordon
- Danielle Nicolet as Gina Hicks
- Adrianne Frost as Vicki Ihrling
- Edrick Browne as Detective Maddox
- Veronica Berry as Felicia Carson
- Shanna Forrestall as Kayla Pierce
- James DuMont as Zoo Guard
- Angelena Swords Brocato as Shelly
- Ross Britz as Rookie Cop
- Michael Dardant as Magician

== Production ==
It is set and filmed in Baton Rouge, Louisiana on February 7 and April 1, 2010.

== Reception ==
Ticking Clock has received negative reviews from critics. On Dread Central, "The Foywonder" rated it 2/5 "blood-stained knives", saying that it was a "fairly iffy serial killer thriller with a few decent moments and an intriguing but otherwise underdeveloped conceit behind its killer's modus operandi; the insulting ending left me wishing I could have turned the clock back and gotten those 100 minutes back." On DVD Talk, Rohit Rao negatively reviewed the film, writing "once you have accepted that you can predict exactly where the film is going, the proceedings are still watchable but far less exciting."

== Home media ==
DVD was released in Region 1 in the United States on January 4, 2011, and also Region 2 in the United Kingdom on 10 January 2011, it was distributed by Sony Pictures Home Entertainment.
