= Your Lucky Day =

2023 film by Daniel Brown

- Theatrical release poster
- Directed by: Daniel Brown
- Written by: Daniel Brown
- Produced by: Luke Barnett; Adam Baxter; Daniel Brown
- Starring: Angus Cloud; Elliot Knight; Jessica Garza; Sterling Beaumon; Mousa Hussein Kraish; Jason Wiles; Sebastian Sozzi; Spencer Garrett; Jason O'Mara
- Cinematography: Justin Henning
- Edited by: Nick Pezzillo
- Music by: Matt Hutchinson
- Distributed by: Well Go USA Entertainment
- Release dates: September 23, 2023 (Fantastic Fest); November 10, 2023
- Running time: 89 minutes
- Country: United States
- Language: English
- Box office: $18,232

Your Lucky Day is a 2023 American action thriller film, written and directed by Daniel Brown. The film stars Angus Cloud (posthumously), Elliot Knight, Jessica Garza, Sterling Beaumon, Mousa Hussein Kraish, Jason Wiles, Sebastian Sozzi, Spencer Garrett and Jason O'Mara. The film was released theatrically by Well Go USA Entertainment on November 10, 2023.

== Plot ==
A young man, Sterling, is mugged at night. He later enters a store, where a customer, Mr. Laird, freely brags about winning a $156 million lottery ticket. Sterling puts on a mask and points a gun and asks for the ticket. However, Cody, a cop in the bathroom hears the commotion and by mistake shoots Mr. Laird, upon which Sterling shoots Cody.

Sterling orders the store-keeper Amir to move the bodies and delete the camera footage. Other customers include Abraham with his pregnant girlfriend Ana. Amir, Abraham, Ana and Sterling decide a way to split the money. Amir's brother-in-law and a security guard arrive to check on him, but are made to leave without arousing suspicion.

The four unlock Mr. Laird's phone and make it appear to the world that he has taken a long vacation. They think about leaving Cody in his car with the murder weapon, but unknown to them, Cody regains consciousness to find the dead body of Mr. Laird near him and calls his dad to tell him about the lottery ticket.

Abraham drives the car with the dead body of Mr. Laird and stops at a railway crossing. The security guard sees him and tries to restrain him, but is subdued. Meanwhile, Cody's dad arrives at the store parking lot with two other members of the police SWAT team and kill Sterling and Amir. Cody's dad enters the store and sees an unmoving Ana with a plastic bag over her head, but she was only pretending to have committed suicide, as she gets up to kill him with a hammer. Another cop enters the store and she kills him with a broken bottle.

She then sets off the sprinkler fire alarm to alert the fire station. Cody arrives in the store and shoots Ana, but is killed by the last remaining cop, Captain Rutledge. Ana hands Rutledge the winning ticket, but he hands it back to her saying, "All you remember is me saving your lives", as firemen and cops arrive on the scene.

Outside, the $156 million sign for the lottery changes to a mere $20 million, indicating that the ticket has been claimed. In a TV interview, Rutledge is told his share was $78 million. Ana is in the hospital with Abraham, celebrating their newborn baby.

== Cast ==
- Angus Cloud as Sterling
- Jessica Garza as Ana Marlene
- Sterling Beaumon as Cody
- Elliot Knight as Abraham
- Mousa Hussein Kraish as Amir
- Jason O'Mara as Captain Rutledge
- Spencer Garrett as Mr. Laird
- Jason Wiles as Dick
- Sebastian Sozzi as Dobbs
- Brendan Morrow as Jimmy

== Production ==
In December 2021, Angus Cloud, Jessica Garza, Elliot Knight, Jason O'Mara, Spencer Garrett, Mousa Hussein Kraish, Jason Wiles, and Sebastian Sozzi joined the cast of the film, with Daniel Brown writing and directing the film. Principal photography began in Los Angeles that same month.

== Release ==
Your Lucky Day premiered at 2023 Fantastic Fest on September 23, and was released in theatres on November 10, 2023, and on video on demand on November 14, 2023. The cast was able to promote the film due to production receiving a SAG-AFTRA interim agreement during the 2023 SAG-AFTRA strike. The film is one of Cloud's last roles before his death in July 2023. The movie made its SVOD debut on Netflix US in March 2024.

== Reception ==
On the review aggregator website Rotten Tomatoes, 90% of 29 critics' reviews are positive, with an average rating of 6.6/10. Metacritic, which uses a weighted average, assigned the film a score of 64 out of 100, based on 7 critics, indicating "generally favorable" reviews.
