= The Starling Girl =

2023 film by Laurel Parmet

- Theatrical release poster
- Directed by: Laurel Parmet
- Written by: Laurel Parmet
- Produced by: Kevin Rowe; Kara Durrett
- Starring: Eliza Scanlen; Lewis Pullman; Jimmi Simpson; Wrenn Schmidt; Austin Abrams
- Cinematography: Brian Lannin
- Edited by: Sam Levy
- Music by: Ben Schneider
- Production companies: 2AM; Pinky Promise
- Distributed by: Bleecker Street (United States and Canada); Universal Pictures and Focus Features (International)
- Release dates: January 21, 2023 (Sundance); May 12, 2023 (United States)
- Running time: 117 minutes
- Country: United States
- Language: English
- Box office: $161,290

The Starling Girl is a 2023 American coming-of-age drama film written and directed by Laurel Parmet in her feature directorial debut. The film stars Eliza Scanlen, Lewis Pullman, Jimmi Simpson, Wrenn Schmidt, and Austin Abrams. Set in a Christian fundamentalist community in Kentucky, it follows Jemima "Jem" Starling (Scanlen), a 17-year-old girl struggling with her religious beliefs as she and Owen Taylor (Pullman), an unhappily married 28-year-old youth pastor, start an illicit relationship.

The Starling Girl premiered at the Sundance Film Festival on January 21, 2023, where it was nominated for the Grand Jury Prize, and was theatrically released in the United States on May 12, 2023. The film received critical acclaim, with particular praise for the performances of the cast and Parmet's direction. At the 39th Independent Spirit Awards, Parmet received a nomination for Best First Screenplay.

== Plot ==
Jem Starling is a 17-year-old girl raised in a fundamentalist Christian community in Kentucky. Her parents Paul and Heidi expect Jem to be a model Christian for her four younger siblings. Jem's age necessitates that she begin the tradition of courting, but she is more interested in dance as a member of her church's dance troupe. Owen, the pastor's 28-year-old son, has just returned to the community from doing missionary work with his wife in Puerto Rico.

When Jem learns the troupe might disband due to not having a leader, she asks Owen, who is in charge of church programs, if she can be appointed the leader, which he allows. She develops a crush on Owen and seeks ways to get closer to the older man, who is supportive of her passion for dance when others tell her she is doing it for vanity and not to praise God.

During one night when they are the only two people in the church building, they share a kiss and begin an illicit relationship. When Jem asks Owen if he thinks she is wicked, he replies he does not, and reasons that because he feels he can be himself around her, what they are doing can't possibly be a sin. He reveals his marriage to his wife Misty is an upsetting one because they married young and "misread the signs".

Jem's family situation becomes strained when Paul, a former alcoholic, relapses. While alone with her dad one night, Jem learns he was a singer in a band prior to converting to Christianity. He still listens to an iPod, which he keeps hidden from Heidi and swears Jem to secrecy about. When Jem asks Paul if he misses his musician life, he insists that the sacrifice is part of God's plan. The troupe is asked to show their routine to Misty, who critiques the performance and says it needs to be tweaked so it is not so centered on Jem. This angers Jem, but she reluctantly complies. After dance practice, she keys Misty's car in retaliation.

The following day, Owen confronts Jem about the car and warns her that any reckless behavior would give them away. Jem apologizes and the two make up at Owen's house, but are nearly found out when Misty arrives home early. Jem is seen by her sister while crawling out the window of his house and tells her to keep quiet about it. After this incident, Owen wants to take a break from the relationship. Jem pleads with him not to and says she think's it's time for them to go public with their relationship, but Owen angrily rebukes her.

Paul catches Jem lying to him about where she is at night and punishes her by making her quit the troupe. During their argument, Jem accuses him of lying as well, prompting him to slap her. Later, he takes an overdose of Heidi's pills, resulting in a hospitalization that leaves him in a coma. Owen's relationship with Jem is discovered when Heidi finds a burner phone given by him in her daughter's belongings. Pastor Taylor comes to the house to talk to Heidi and Jem, pointedly interrogating Jem about when the relationship started and her culpability. When Jem asks about Owen, the pastor says Owen doesn't want to be there and that his life is ruined. According to the pastor, Owen claims it was Jem who tempted him and "inhibited his ability to control himself". Heidi and the pastor resolve that Jem must spend some time away at a disciplinary camp. At church, Jem is asked to recant her sins in front of everyone. All the church members, including Owen, approach Jem to say, "I forgive you."

As Jem prepares to leave for the camp, she is stopped by Owen, who declares he has left his wife and wants to be with Jem. Heidi tries to drive him away, but Jem defies her and leaves with Owen in his car. The two take up residence at a motel. While going through her things, Jem discovers her father's iPod in her jacket pocket. That night while Owen sleeps, she sneaks away for a moment and takes his car. She drives to a bar her father told her he used to perform at with his band. While there, a song plays and she happily dances alone to it, losing herself in the dance.

== Cast ==
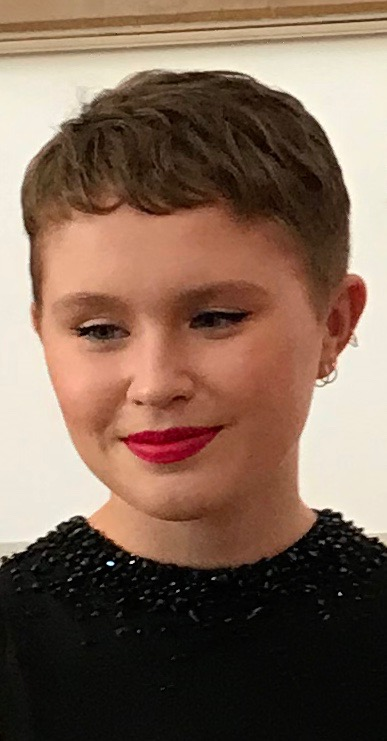
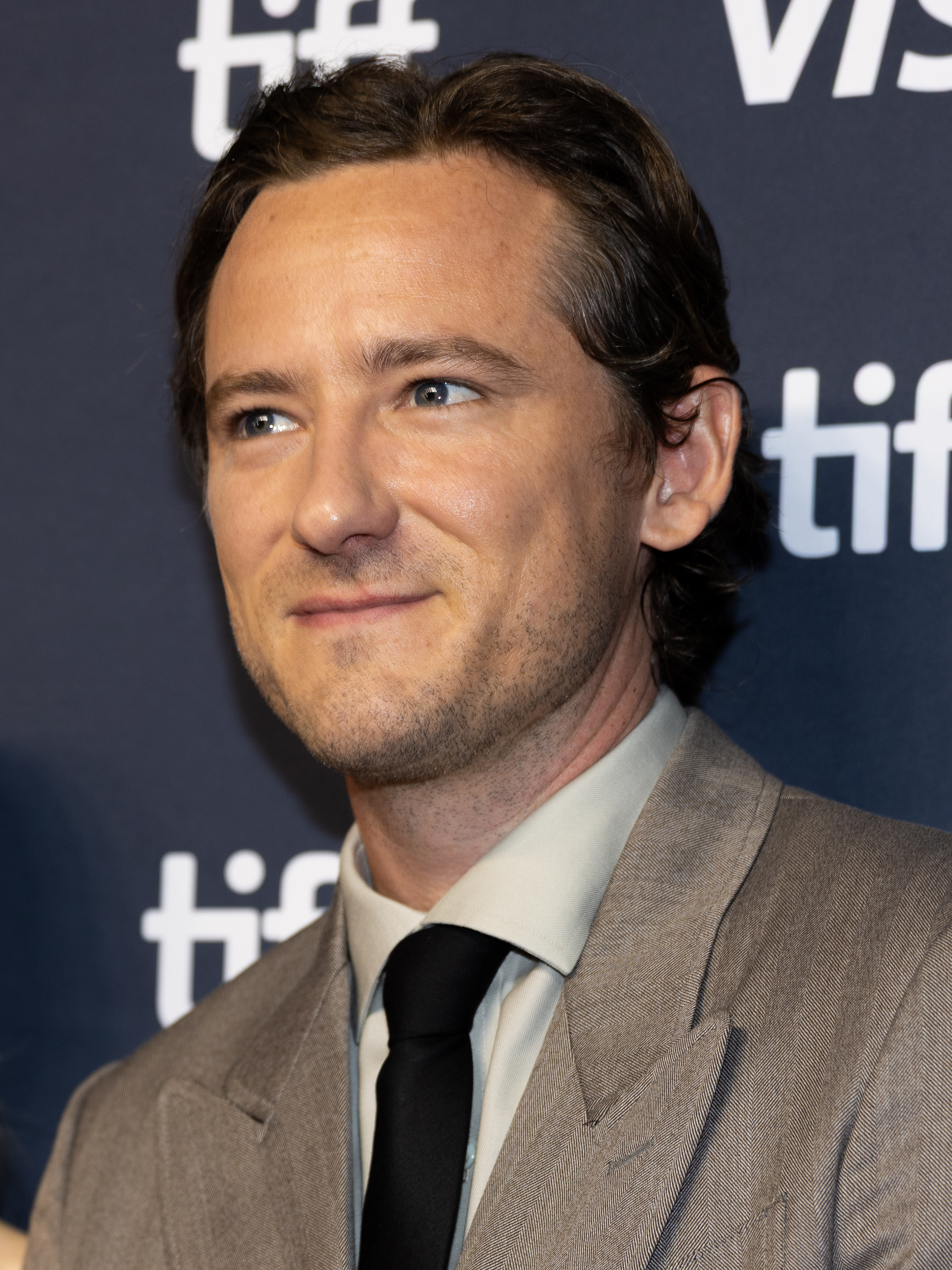
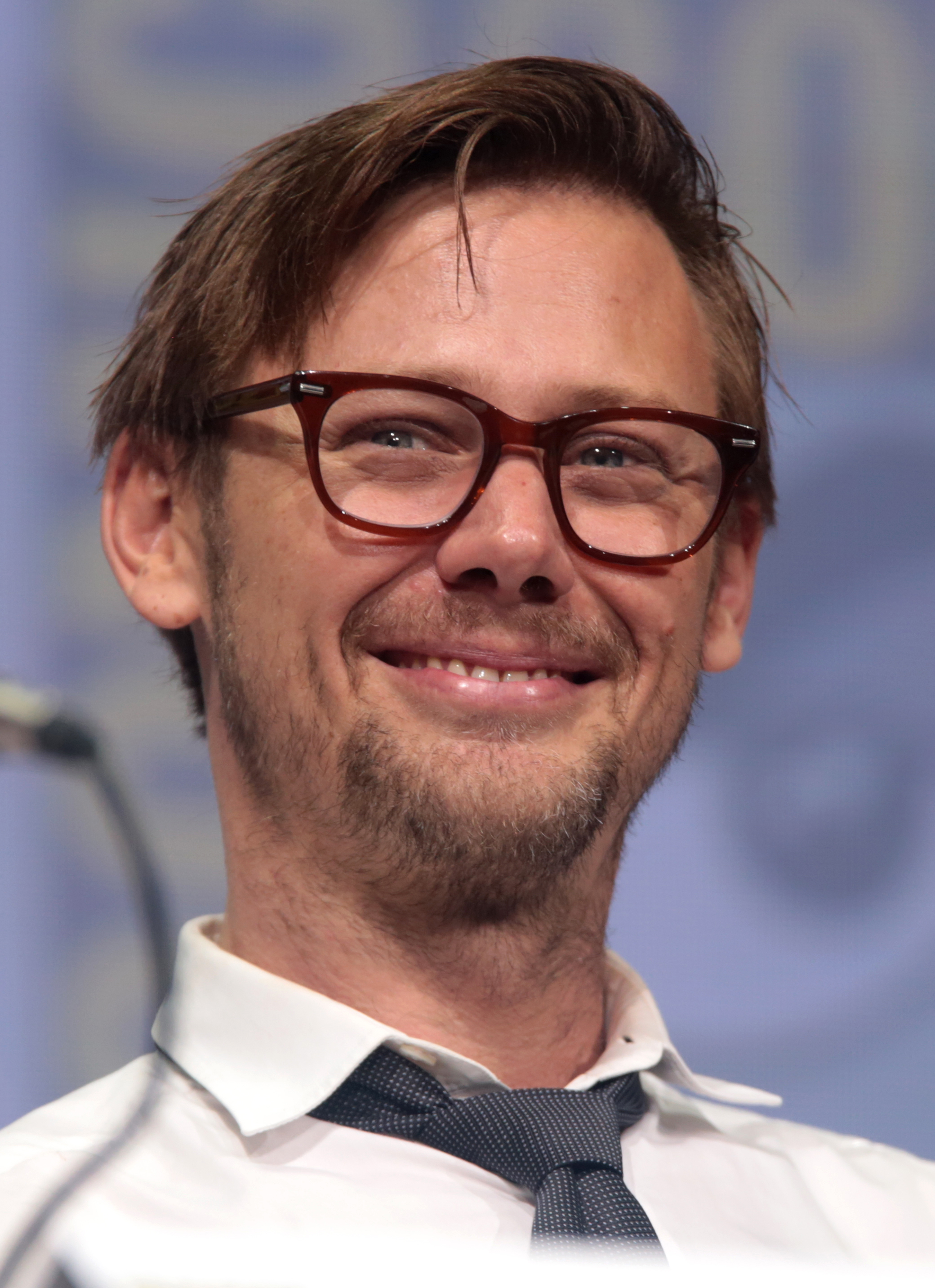
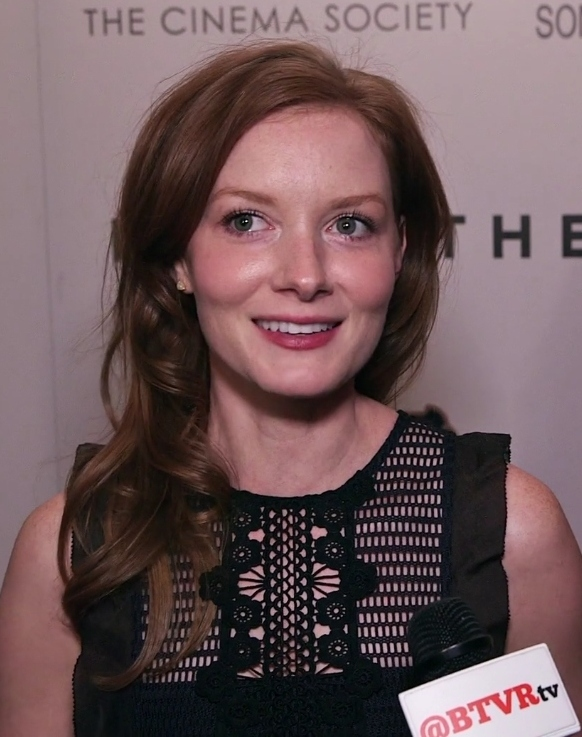
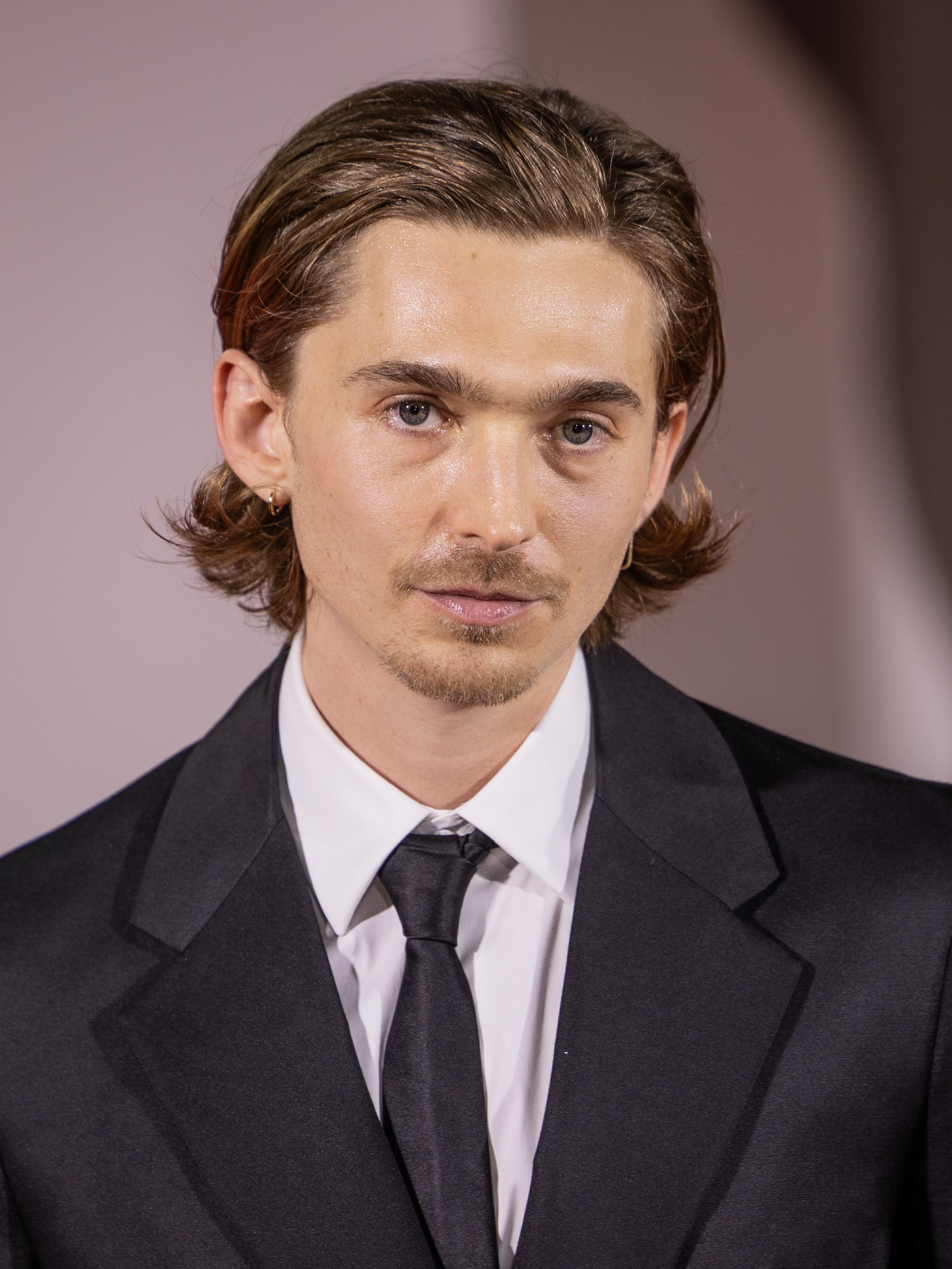
The film stars Eliza Scanlen, Lewis Pullman, Jimmi Simpson, Wrenn Schmidt and Austin Abrams
- Eliza Scanlen as Jemima "Jem" Starling
- Lewis Pullman as Owen Taylor
- Jimmi Simpson as Paul Starling
- Wrenn Schmidt as Heidi Starling
- Kyle Secor as Pastor Taylor
- Austin Abrams as Ben Taylor
- Claire Elizabeth Green as Rebecca Starling
- Jessamine Burgum as Misty Taylor
- Ellie May as Sarah Starling
- Chris Dinner as Noah Starling
- Kieran Sitawi as Jeremy Starling

== Production ==
Parmet began writing the script in 2017. Her idea for the story came from research work she did in Oklahoma about Christian fundamentalist communities. From spending time with the women of these communities and attending their church, Parmet "learned that [the women] believed that their desires were sinful. There was a woman in their church who had had an affair with a church authority member and she received the blame instead of him. When I first heard these stories, I was like, 'Their world is so backwards. I’m so glad that my life’s not like this.' But the more I thought about it, the more I saw how much we actually had in common, in terms of how we grew up, our relationships with our bodies and what society teaches us to feel about our desires." Parmet also drew from her own experiences in a relationship she had as a teenager, saying she "decided that I wanted to tell a story looking back at my experience and set it in a world that, while extreme and specific, has so much in common with the culture at large.”

The film was shot in the area of Louisville, Kentucky. Production took place from May 16 to June 17, 2022.

== Music ==
Music from the Starling Girl is the film score soundtrack to the 2023 film The Starling Girl written and directed by Laurel Parmet in her feature directorial debut, stars Eliza Scanlen, Lewis Pullman, Jimmi Simpson, Wrenn Schmidt, and Austin Abrams. The score is written, composed and produced by Ben Schneider of the indie folk band Lord Huron while the band was credited for the soundtrack. The album was preceded by the first single "Ace Up My Sleeve" which released on May 19, 2023, and the 14-track album was released on June 21, 2023, under the Republic Records label.

== Release ==
The film premiered at the 2023 Sundance Film Festival on January 21, 2023. In February, Bleecker Street acquired North American distribution rights for the film. It also screened at South by Southwest on March 12, 2023. It was released on May 12, 2023, with a wider expansion on May 19. On October 9, 2023, it was released to SVOD on Paramount+ w/Showtime.

== Critical reception ==
On the review aggregator website Rotten Tomatoes, 92% of 89 critics' reviews are positive, with an average rating of 7.6/10. The website's consensus reads: "Sensitively and intelligently crafted by writer-director Laurel Parmet, The Starling Girl is a well-told coming-of-age story centering around a young woman's struggles with her spiritual faith." Metacritic, which uses a weighted average, assigned the film a score of 78 out of 100, based on 20 critics, indicating "generally favorable" reviews.

Critics lauded the performances and Parmet's direction. Katie Walsh of TheWrap wrote, "Parmet’s strong script and surety behind the camera navigates the audience through this complicated story of religion and sexuality, patriarchy and power, brought to eerily accurate life by the ensemble of excellent actors. Scanlen, who is always tremendous, from Little Women to Babyteeth, holds the center with ease, while Pullman proves his chops in this complex role. But Schmidt (whose accent and cadence is spot on) and Simpson just about steal the show in their supporting roles as the steely, severe Heidi and deteriorating Paul."

David Ehrlich of IndieWire gave the film a grade of B+ and wrote though the film "tells a tale as old as time — the broad strokes of its story about the affair between a naïve teenage girl and a married older man who swears that he’ll leave his wife adhere to convention from start to finish...the power of this sensitive and devilishly detailed coming-of-age drama is rooted in the friction that it finds between biblical paternalism and modern personhood. While young women have always been taught to be ashamed of their desires...Parmet’s self-possessed debut is uncommonly well-attuned to how garbled that gospel might sound to a God-loving girl who’s been raised amid the echoes of a secular culture." In The Hollywood Reporter, Jourdain Searles wrote, "The Starling Girl is a complex, often disturbing portrait of the way women have been pressured to shrink themselves and pass on that shame to their daughters. Somewhere inside them they know it breeds unhappiness, but for them it’s a small price to pay for admittance into the kingdom of Heaven."

In The Guardian, Adrian Horton wrote Parmet succeeds in "depicting an insular religious community – a group of fundamentalist Christians in present-day Kentucky – with enough specificity and emotional acuity to bridge the gap with viewers who will find such a place opaque, unrelatable or possibly even unbelievable." Collider's Maggie Boccella wrote, "The Starling Girl is steeped with empathy, not just for Jem, but for every young woman, religious or not, who struggles to know herself and gives in to the desire to be seen, no matter the voyeur — just to feel alive, and like they matter."

The Film Stage's Michael Frank wrote, "For those with a religious background, the elements of dread, wielding power over our own upbringing, our own residual guilt that sticks with one long after they’ve stopped going to church will be well-recognized. For others, it’ll be a strong showing from an up-and-coming director with two terrific, mostly quiet lead performances. Both perspectives elevate the film above standard fare depicting the dangers of fundamentalism."
