= Worst Friends (2014 film) =

- DVD cover
- Directed by: Ralph Arend
- Screenplay by: Ralph Arend
- Produced by: Ralph Arend; Erika Hampson; Richard Tanne; Noah Barrow
- Starring: Richard Tanne; Kristen Connolly; Cody Horn; Geoffrey Arend; Larry Fessenden; Noah Barrow; Kathryn Erbe
- Cinematography: Vincent Peone
- Edited by: Joe Lindquist
- Music by: Mike Fiore
- Distributed by: Level 33 Entertainment
- Release date: November 4, 2014
- Country: United States
- Language: English

Worst Friends is an American comedy film, written, produced and directed by Ralph Arend and starring Richard Tanne, Noah Barrow, Kristen Connolly, and Cody Horn, with Larry Fessenden, Geoffrey Arend, and Kathryn Erbe. It was released on November 4, 2014.

== Plot ==
Worst Friends has been described as a dark Indie comedy. The film is set in an unnamed New Jersey suburb and focuses around a number of key characters. The film opens explaining the close but troubled friendship of two young boys.

It explores the role of friendships when a traumatic incident takes place and how there can be a fine line between help and dependence. Jake (Richard Tanne) is a young man suffering traumatic injuries after he is hit by a car. He turns to his childhood friend Sam (Noah Barrow) for support and to help him recover.

A physical therapist (Cody Horn) is enlisted and begins to help Sam with Jake's recovery. Sam and Jake's friendship takes a turn for the worse when Sam's childhood sweetheart, Zoe (Kristen Connolly), returns to town. Her presence becomes a true test of Sam and Jake's friendship.

== Cast ==
- Richard Tanne as Jake, the lead character who suffers traumatic injuries
- Noah Barrow as Sam, Jake's best friend who comes to aid him after the injury
- Kristen Connolly as Zoe, Sam's childhood sweetheart, who moves back to town following Jake's injury
- Cody Horn as Lily, a physical therapist
- Larry Fessenden as Jerry
- Deanna Russo as Cassandra
- Kathryn Erbe as Sam's Mother
- Geoffrey Arend as Jeremy
- Bridget Burke as Julie
- Sara Chase as Sara
- Josh Ruben as Marky
- Brandon Bales as Delivery Guy
- Sarah Wynter as Linda
- Holly Taylor as Little Girl
- Timothée Chalamet as Young Sam
- Cody Kostro as Young Jake

== Production ==
The concept of the plot was taken from Richard Tanne's own experiences in 2010. While recovering from an injury in his home state of New Jersey, Tanne reconnected with filmmakers Ralph Arend and Noah Barrow and the idea generated traction over the coming weeks.

On July 28, 2010, the producers launched a Kickstarter campaign aiming to make $11,000 to fund the film. By August 11, 2010, the campaign had raised over $17,000.

Following the online premiere of the trailer, it was announced by Deadline that Level 33 Entertainment would be distributing the film across North America.

The film was then released on November 4, 2014 through video on-demand and DVD.

== Reception ==
The film received mainly positive reviews following its launch in 2014.

In its review, Yes! Weekly described the film as a “loose, likeable comedy” with a “fun cast.” Actor Larry Fessenden was singled out for “amusingly channeling Jack Nicholson.”

Videoviews.org awarded the film 3 1/2 out of 5 stars and wrote, "Worst Friends is a simple story but the acting and well-written dialogue take it up a notch."

Spectrum Culture reviewed the film in 2014, stating the film covered the harsh realities of some friendships and praised the film’s opening for its effective storytelling, but ultimately only awarded the film 2 out of 5 stars.
