= Chemical Hearts =

2020 film by Richard Tanne

- Directed by: Richard Tanne
- Screenplay by: Richard Tanne
- Based on: Our Chemical Hearts by Krystal Sutherland
- Produced by: Richard Tanne; Alex Saks
- Starring: Lili Reinhart; Austin Abrams
- Cinematography: Albert Salas
- Edited by: JC Bond
- Music by: Stephen James Taylor
- Production companies: Page Fifty-Four Pictures; Awesomeness Films; Big Indie Pictures
- Distributed by: Amazon Studios
- Release date: August 21, 2020
- Running time: 93 minutes
- Country: United States
- Language: English

Chemical Hearts is a 2020 American romantic psychological drama film written, produced, and directed by Richard Tanne, based on the 2016 young adult novel Our Chemical Hearts by Krystal Sutherland. It stars Lili Reinhart and Austin Abrams.

Teenager Henry Page, a self-proclaimed romantic, falls in love with troubled transfer Grace Town, during their senior year in high school.

The film was released on Amazon Prime Video on August 21, 2020.

== Plot ==
Teenager Henry Page considers himself a hopeless romantic but has never fallen in love. He aspires to be a writer and to be chosen as editor of his high school newspaper. The newspaper's faculty advisor disappoints him by making him share the editor position with Grace Town, a new student in his class. Grace is physically disabled —walking with a limp and using a cane. She is also sullen and morose and initially rejects Henry's attempts to talk to her.

After missing his bus on the first day, Henry and Grace wind up walking home along the same route. Although distant at first, she relents and offers to drive him home once they reach her house. However, Grace refuses to drive and has Henry drive her car and leave it at his house. The next day, a mysterious middle-aged man quietly retrieves the car.

As Grace begins to let Henry into her life, she shows him an abandoned factory with a pool containing koi fish. He falls in love with her despite her mixed signals and obvious indications that she is emotionally traumatized. Henry follows Grace one day and finds her at the grave of a teenager named Dominic. Upon further investigation, he learns that the deceased was her boyfriend, who was killed in a car crash, and that Grace was in the car when it happened—sustaining injuries which led to her disability.

Their romance peaks at a Halloween party, after which they have sex. It is Henry's first time. They have a romantic few days together, but Grace is still troubled.

On the anniversary of the car crash, Henry goes to Grace's house and learns that she has been living in the room of her deceased boyfriend, with his mother and father (the man who had picked up her car earlier). Grace finds him there and they argue as she is clearly still in love with her dead boyfriend. Henry cannot handle this revelation and they break up.

One day, after being told by Dom's father that Grace has gone missing, Henry finds her in the koi pool, wearing what was to have been her wedding dress. He takes her back to her home.

As Henry's and Grace's senior year comes to an end, they avoid talking to one another at the school. Grace leaves the newspaper after taking some time off school. After the last issue of the newspaper is released, to which Henry has contributed a heartfelt essay about the biochemistry of teenagers, they meet in a school hallway.

Their encounter is an emotional one. They hug, and Grace slips him the taped-together, highlighted Neruda poem about love he had ripped up after their break up. They then go their separate ways.

== Cast ==
- Austin Abrams as Henry Page
- Lili Reinhart as Grace Town
- Sarah Jones as Sadie
- Adhir Kalyan as Kem Sharma
- Bruce Altman as Toby
- Kara Young as Lola
- Coral Peña as Cora
- C.J. Hoff as Murray
- Catherine Curtin as Sarah

== Production ==
In June 2016, Awesomeness Films acquired the screen rights to Chemical Hearts. In June 2019, it was announced Lili Reinhart and Austin Abrams had joined the cast of the film, with Richard Tanne directing from a screenplay he wrote. Principal photography began in June 2019 in New Jersey. Filming locations included Woodland Cemetery in Newark and Emerson Junior-Senior High School in Emerson.

== Release ==
Chemical Hearts was released on Amazon Prime Video on August 21, 2020.

== Reception ==
=== Critical response ===
According to review aggregator Rotten Tomatoes, 59% of 98 critics gave the film positive reviews with an average rating of 5.7/10. Out of 21 "Top Critics", 67% gave the film positive reviews. The site's critics consensus reads, "For better and for worse, Chemical Hearts captures the well-worn ups and downs of melodramatic teenage love - and countless other films about it." Metacritic assigned the film a weighted average score of 57 out of 100, based on 16 critics, indicating "mixed or average" reviews.

Sheila O'Malley of RogerEbert.com described the film as "sneakily subversive," and "very unpredictable," writing that, "there's much to be said for what Tanne has pulled off in Chemical Hearts, for his gentle and measured approach. You actually feel like you have been through something by the end." She added that "Lili Reinhart is a revelation. She has such gravitas as an actress," and that, "Abrams is a thoughtful presence, and best when he's forced to deal with her unpredictable behavior. Watch his reactions. He's paying such close attention to her, trying to read her face. These two young actors make this bond make sense."

San Francisco Chronicle's G. Allen Johnson concluded his review by asserting that "what makes Chemical Hearts so good is it's unafraid of its feelings. It tackles complicated emotional issues such as depression, suicide, sex and love with a straightforward honesty. For once, a film about young people is completely free of snark and irony."

Writing for Time, Stephanie Zacharek opined that the film "captures the joy and agony—and the lasting scars—of teenage romance."

David Ehrlich, reviewing for IndieWire, praised Tanne's direction of the film, writing that he employed "a more patient and open-ended aesthetic than you'd expect to find in a YA adaptation; shot on a 35mm stock that can make an entire bedroom vibrate with potential, some entire scenes are captured in just a handful of static medium-wide shots that aren't afraid to set these characters adrift in a vast sea of their own feelings." He wrote that the film "has an uncanny way of capturing the basic combustibility of teenage feelings."

Some reviewers have noted areas for improvement. Ed Potton from The Times wrote that "while the travails of adolescence never really change, surely we can find new ways of exploring them." The Columbia Chronicle pointed out that the portrayal of teenage experiences sometimes felt forced, with a focus on the male protagonist's narrative overshadowing the female lead's depth. Empire called it "an impassioned and imperfect portrait of teenage grief and heartbreak," with a "script that seems designed to be repurposed in retweets, Instagram stories, and probably even tattoos."

=== Accolades ===
Chemical Hearts received various recognitions after its release. The film was nominated for Best Streaming Movie of the Year at the 2021 SEC Awards. Youth-oriented online media platform The Second Angle placed the film at number 5 on its list of "Ultimate 25 movies every girl must watch before turning 25." Comic Book Resources listed the film as #3 in their article, "10 Best Coming-of-Age Movies On Prime Video," writing that it "dives deep into complicated themes like sadness, love, affection, sex, and regret and showcases them honestly and beautifully. There is no pretense in Chemical Hearts, and Grace and Austin's bond is an unforgettable one."

In their article "11 Movies From 2020 You Forgot Were Awesome", MovieWeb suggested that the COVID-19 pandemic in 2020 caused many films to go unnoticed despite their quality, including Chemical Hearts, which they described as "a melancholy yet inspiring exploration of coming-of-age conflict, grief, trauma, and mental health." They praised Reinhart and Abrams for their "adorable chemistry" and "stellar performances," and wrote that the movie "dives deep into the science and psychology of heartbreak, what it means to move on, lose parts of ourselves, and rediscover them. Directed by Richard Tanne, Chemical Hearts has an indie feel with ideal soundtracks that grounds the viewer in the small-town story scene by scene."
