= Southside with You =

- Theatrical release poster
- Directed by: Richard Tanne
- Written by: Richard Tanne
- Produced by: Tika Sumpter; Richard Tanne; Robert Teitel
- Starring: Parker Sawyers; Tika Sumpter; Vanessa Bell Calloway
- Cinematography: Pat Scola
- Edited by: Evan Schiff
- Music by: Stephen James Taylor
- Production companies: IM Global; Get Lifted Film Co.
- Distributed by: Miramax; Roadside Attractions
- Release dates: January 24, 2016 (Sundance); August 26, 2016 (United States)
- Running time: 84 minutes
- Country: United States
- Language: English
- Budget: $1.5 million
- Box office: $6.5 million

Southside with You is a 2016 American biographical romantic drama film written, produced, and directed by Richard Tanne, in his feature film directorial debut. The film stars Parker Sawyers and Tika Sumpter as a young Barack Obama (the future 44th president of the United States), and Michelle Robinson, respectively, and focuses on the couple's first date in 1989.

The film premiered at the 2016 Sundance Film Festival, where it garnered critical acclaim. It was released theatrically in the United States on August 26, 2016, by Miramax and Roadside Attractions, and grossed over $6.5 million worldwide.

== Plot ==
Harvard Law School student Barack Obama, while working as a summer associate at a Chicago law firm in 1989, arranges to meet Michelle Robinson, a young lawyer and his supervisor at the firm ostensibly to go to a community organizing meeting. However, when they meet in the morning, he tells her that the meeting is at 4 pm and he wants to fill the time till then getting to know each other. She is initially apprehensive because they work together, but agrees.

They visit an African art exhibition at a local art center which features an Ernie Barnes exhibit, and share stories about growing up while walking through a park. At the community organizing meeting, Obama gives a rousing speech which is well-received by the audience including Robinson. In the evening, they view a screening of Spike Lee's Do the Right Thing, and have their first kiss outside an ice cream parlor in what winds up being their first date.

== Cast ==
- Parker Sawyers as Barack Obama
- Tika Sumpter as Michelle Robinson
- Vanessa Bell Calloway as Marian Robinson
- Phillip Edward Van Lear as Fraser C. Robinson
- Deanna Reed-Foster as Bernadette
- Jerod Haynes as Tommy
- Gabrielle Lott-Rogers as Rafiqa
- Tom McEloryn as Avery Goodman
- Taylar Fondren as Janice
- Donn Carl Harper as Curtis
- Preston Tate, Jr. as Kyle

== Production ==
The original idea was developed by Richard Tanne in 2007, after which he started writing the script. On December 5, 2014, Deadline reported that there would be a romance film titled Southside with You, based on the first date of American President Barack Obama and his wife Michelle Obama, set in Chicago, where the couple met in 1989 and married in 1992. Tika Sumpter would play Michelle, while no one had yet been cast in Barack's role. Tanne would make his directing debut on the film, based on his own script, and producing alongside Tika Sumpter.

On April 10, 2015, IM Global came on board to produce the film with producer Robert Teitel. In April 2015, Sumpter talked with Vulture about her preparations to play Michelle, and stated that she was "nervous" because she was about to play "Michelle Obama, who is everything every woman wants to be," and also said that she was reading some poetry and books to get to know more about Michelle, so she could portray the role better. On May 7, 2015, Parker Sawyers was cast as the young Barack Obama. Producers on the film were Tanne and Sumpter, along with Teitel, through IM Global.

=== Filming ===
Principal photography on the film began on July 13, 2015 on location in Chicago, Illinois; following that, several websites released photos from the set. Filming wrapped on July 31, 2015. Locations included downtown, the South Side, and the West Side. Filming was also done on Amstutz Expressway in Waukegan.

== Release ==
The film had its world premiere at the Sundance Film Festival on January 24, 2016. Shortly after, Miramax and Roadside Attractions acquired theatrical distribution rights to the film. On April 28, 2016, Miramax released the first official trailer for the film. The film was distributed worldwide with theatrical releases in France, Germany, Singapore, UK, Ireland, Greece, Cyprus, Turkey, Spain, Italy, Hong Kong, and parts of the Middle East.

=== Box office ===
Southside with You was released in North America on August 26, 2016, and was initially projected to gross around $2 million from 813 theaters in its opening weekend. It ended up grossing $2.9 million, a per-theater average of $3,762. The film went on to gross a total of $6.5 million against its $1.5 million budget.

=== Home media ===
Southside with You became available on Digital HD on November 29, 2016 and Blu-Ray and DVD on December 13, 2016 from Lionsgate and Miramax. The film became available to stream on Netflix on April 26, 2017. On November 10, 2018, the film had its cable television premiere on BET, airing back-to-back with BET Presents: Love and Happiness: An Obama Celebration, a televised 2016 White House concert that honored the Presidency of Barack Obama and the First Lady Michelle Obama.

== Reception ==
=== Critical response ===
Southside with You received mostly positive reviews, with praise going to Tanne's direction and screenplay, as well as to the performances of Sumpter and Sawyers. Upon its premiere at Sundance, it immediately garnered positive buzz with Essence writing that "critics gave it two very enthusiastic thumbs up, calling it a classic romance story." On review aggregator Rotten Tomatoes, the film holds an approval rating of 92% based on 159 reviews, with an average rating of 7.30/10. The website's critical consensus states, "Southside with You looks back on a fateful real-life date with strong performances and engaging dialogue, adding up to a romance that makes for a pretty good date movie in its own right." On Metacritic, the film has a weighted average score of 74 out of 100, based on 43 critics, indicating "generally favorable reviews".

Justin Chang of Variety wrote that the film "stands as something unique, even audacious in American independent movies: a fact-based presidential "prequel" that seeks to present two iconic world figures as convincing and relatable romantic leads. And on that particular score, Tanne's movie — toplined by the very well-cast Tika Sumpter and Parker Sawyers — is pretty much an unqualified success."

Critic Peter Travers of Rolling Stone called it "the date movie of the year," and described it as "gorgeously romantic." Richard Brody of The New Yorker touted Tanne's first film as "an opening act of superb audacity," and described it as "a fully realized, intricately imagined, warmhearted, sharp-witted, and perceptive drama, one that sticks close to its protagonists while resonating quietly but grandly with the sweep of a historical epic."

Odie Henderson of RogerEbert.com gave the film four-out-of-four stars, stating that it is "at once a love song to the city of Chicago and its denizens, an unmistakably Black romance and a gentle, universal comedy," adding that "it is unapologetic about all three of these elements, and interweaves them in such a subtle fashion that they become more pronounced only upon later reflection."

Stephanie Zacharek of Time described it as a "vivid and imaginative portrayal," and noted of the two lead performances that "Sawyers captures both the easy, loping rhythms of our future 44th President’s speech and the long-stride elegance of his carriage. Sumpter is equally terrific," adding that "she manifests perfectly the future First Lady's under-the-radar determination, always tempered by empathy."

The film was criticized by several critics for what they deemed a hagiographic depiction of Obama, while others questioned its authenticity. Fred Topel of Guff.com opined that Obama comes across as predatory in the film by ignoring Robinson's boundaries, which he did not find believable.

The film was cited on many year-end lists including The New Yorker, The Washington Post, The San Francisco Chronicle, The Hollywood Reporter, RogerEbert.com, The Huffington Post, Mandatory, Applaudience on Medium and Ain’t It Cool News.

=== Accolades ===
Award	Date of ceremony	Category	Recipient(s)	Result	Ref(s)
Chicago Indie Critics	January 8, 2017	Best Chicago Film	Southside With You	Won	
Seattle International Film Festival	June 12, 2016	Golden Space Needle Award for Best Film	Southside With You	Nominated	
Black Reel Awards	February 16, 2017	Outstanding Actor, Motion Picture	Parker Sawyers	Nominated	
Black Reel Awards	February 16, 2017	Outstanding Original Song	John Legend	Nominated	
NAACP Image Awards	February 11, 2017	Outstanding Actress in a Motion Picture	Tika Sumpter	Nominated	
NAACP Image Awards	February 11, 2017	Outstanding Writing in a Motion Picture (Film)	Richard Tanne	Nominated	
Indiana Film Critics Association	December 4, 2016	Best Picture	Southside With You	Nominated	
Indiana Film Critics Association	December 4, 2016	Breakout of the Year	Parker Sawyers	Nominated	
Indiana Film Critics Association	December 4, 2016	Breakout of the Year	Tika Sumpter	Nominated	
Gotham Awards	November 28, 2016	Bingham Ray Breakthrough Director	Richard Tanne	Nominated	
Gotham Awards	November 28, 2016	Audience Award	Southside With You	Nominated	
Maui Film Festival	June 20, 2016	Best First Narrative Feature	Richard Tanne	Won	
Sundance Film Festival	January 30, 2016	Grand Jury Prize	Richard Tanne	Nominated	
Rotten Tomatoes Golden Tomato Awards	January 12, 2017	Best Reviewed Romance Movie 2016	Southside With You	Won	

== Legacy ==
Rotten Tomatoes ranked the film #55 on its list of Top 105 Romance Movies of all time. It also ranked the film #53 on its list of The 123 Best Black Movies of the 21st Century and #14 on its list of 55 Movies That Celebrate Black Joy. Entertainment website Collider included the film on its list of The 25 Best Romance Movies of the 21st Century. AARP named it one of the top 12 best movies ever made about U.S. Presidents. Harper's Bazaar cited it as the 41st most Romantic Movie of All Time. Vulture included the film on their list of 20 Best Movies About American Presidents, while Time Out listed it as one of the 27 Best Chicago Movies.

== See also ==
- List of black films of the 2010s
