= Mischief Night (2014 film) =

Film by Travis Baker

- Release poster
- Directed by: Travis Baker
- Written by: Travis Baker
- Produced by: Richard Tanne
- Starring: Brooke Anne Smith; Marc Valera; Nikki Limo; Matt Angel; Malcolm McDowell
- Cinematography: Sean O'Dea
- Edited by: Joe Lindquist
- Music by: Brian Bond; Jeremy Tisser; Alex Tyshkov; Charles Tyshkov
- Production company: October County Films
- Distributed by: Lionsgate Home Entertainment
- Release date: May 20, 2014
- Running time: 88 minutes
- Country: United States
- Language: English

Mischief Night is a 2014 American slasher film written and directed by Travis Baker. It stars Brooke Anne Smith, Marc Valera, Nikki Limo, Matt Angel, Erik Palladino, and Malcolm McDowell. The film was produced by Richard Tanne.

The film was released in the United States on May 20, 2014, by Lionsgate Home Entertainment.

== Plot ==
Kaylie is a beautiful high school senior who does not quite fit in. She has a dark sense of humor, and a somewhat warped view of life that isolates her from most of her peers. Her best friend Daphne, on the other hand, is incredibly popular. It is Friday night, the night before Halloween, and Daphne has asked Kaylie to fill in and babysit for her at the Payton household. Daphne claims to be sick at home with the flu, but unbeknownst to Kaylie, she is actually headed out for a night on the town.

To help occupy her time, Kaylie watches a horror film, drinks the Paytons' liquor, pops their pills, and starts a war with a roaming group of middle schoolers trying to vandalize the home.

There are many people out in the neighborhood. One of them, a creepy old neighbor, knocks at the door, warning Kaylie to stay inside that night and not answer the door for anyone. She immediately rejects his advice, answering the door for a costumed stranger who turns out to be Graham, a classmate of Kaylie's who she has a crush on. Graham was expecting Daphne to answer the door; he has been visiting Daphne at the house whenever she babysits, which comes as both a surprise to Kaylie, and a devastating blow. When he leaves, she cuts herself, revealing a series of scars. Meanwhile, a masked man, carrying a large knife, is lurking the streets and prowling the dark shadows surrounding the Payton house.

When Kaylie realizes the masked man is out there, she begins to tease him and taunt him into confrontation, assuming he is just another prankster. When she is convinced he is quietly watching from behind the trees, she strips down to her underwear and swims in the Paytons' pool. Things intensify quickly when Daphne shows up and is brutally murdered. The masked stranger then breaks into the house, attacking Kaylie, who fights back by bashing him with a free-weight and sending him tumbling down the stairs. He removes his mask to reveal the man underneath and overpowers her.

It is within his power to kill her now, and instead of begging for her life, she encourages him to do it. The man, who is far less intimidating without his mask on, does not know how to react. He eventually decides against killing her, and sets her free. The two start talking, and soon a strange, twisted romance blossoms between them. They head into the neighborhood to cause a little mischief themselves, and gradually, over the course of the night, begin to reveal to each other what makes them tick.

Kaylie and the man have sex, but when she asks him to stab her during, he becomes disturbed and goes outside to think. Meanwhile, the middle-school vandals return to seek revenge on Kaylie and are brutally murdered outside the house.

Kaylie and the man have a final conversation in which the man explains that he has a family he must go home to and that he does not have the strength to go through with killing anyone, as he had previously thought. They say goodbye and Kaylie slices his throat with a carving knife, revealing that she has been the killer all along, responsible for Daphne's and the middle schoolers' deaths. She explains that she was always unstable and that discovering about Daphne and Graham's affair caused her to snap.

Later, the police investigate the crime scene and we learn that Kaylie has pinned all the murders on the masked man. Graham shows up, concerned for her well-being, and the two hug as Kaylie winks at the camera.

== Cast ==
- Brooke Anne Smith as Kaylie
- Marc Valera as The Man
- Malcolm McDowell as Mr. Smiles
- Nikki Limo as Daphne
- Matt Angel as Graham
- Erik Palladino as Mr. Peyton

== Production and release ==
Mischief Night was filmed in 2010 at a house in Calabasas, California. Filming took place over 11 days and consisted mostly of night shoots. The film was acquired in late 2013 by After Dark Films and was announced as the seventh film in the After Dark Originals 2 series.

The film had its world premiere at the New York City Horror Film Festival on November 16, 2013. It was released in the United States by Lionsgate Home Entertainment on DVD, Digital HD, and video on demand on May 20, 2014. The film was released in China in 2014 and throughout Europe in 2015 under the title Devil's Night.

== Soundtrack ==
Jeremy Tisser was the composer of the original soundtrack. Additional songs were then provided by Brian Bond, Alex Tsyhkov, and Charles Tyshkov.

== Reception ==
Although reception was mixed, many reviewers singled out the film for its originality and deeper themes. Ollie Coen of DVD Talk wrote, "Thankfully Mischief Night was a surprisingly interesting film, one that took the old premise, mixed it up a bit, and left me pretty satisfied." He went on to describe the film as "a fresh take on a classic story, a new & strange way to look at the genre."

In its 2014 review, Ain't It Cool News wrote of the film, "It's tough to combine multiple genres in a way that simultaneously feels both fresh and familiar – the plot will keep you guessing until the end, and I love that it struck such tight-wire balance with a self-assuredness that keeps you on your toes as it zigs every time you think it's about to zag."

In its review, Something Awful described the film as one that "was clearly written by someone who loves cheesy horror flicks and all their accompanying features, as it displays a charming sort of self-awareness and affection for the content it's playing with."

However, some felt that despite its bold ideas, the film didn't ultimately succeed. In his review for Film Monthly, Jason Coffman wrote, "there are moments in Mischief Night when the film hits a tone that is entirely its own, and likely what writer/director Travis Baker was aiming for with the film as a whole. Sadly, those moments are fleeting."
