= James B. Taylor (educator) =

American educator (1927-2016)

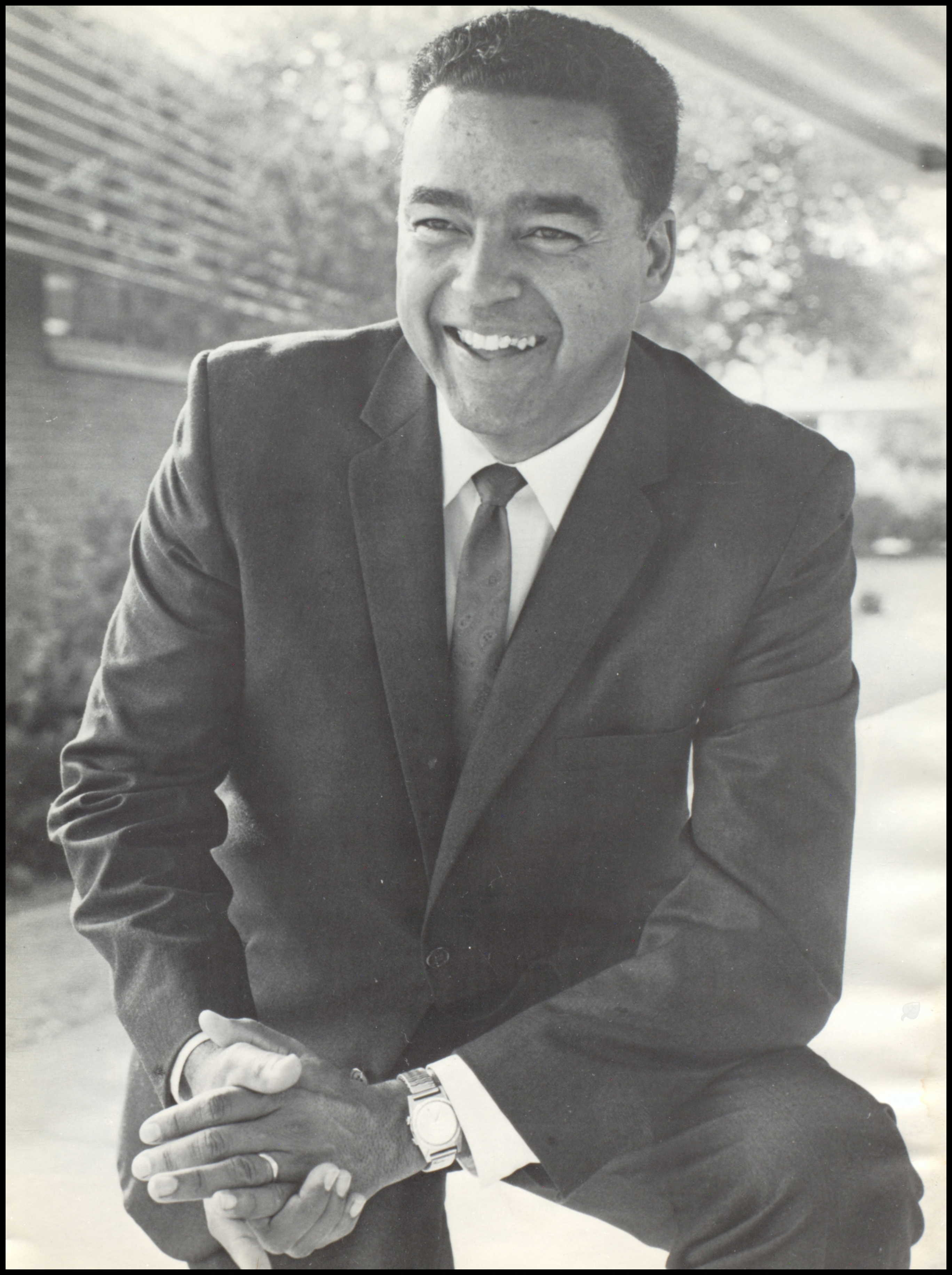
- James B. Taylor in 1967
- Born: January 28, 1927; Los Angeles, California, U.S.
- Died: April 26, 2016 (aged 89); Los Angeles, California, U.S.
- Education: UCLA (A.B.) (1949); USC (M.Ed.)
- Occupation(s): Educator and school administrator
- Spouse: Jane Carolyn Johnson (m. 1949; died 1993)
- Children: 5 (including Stephen James Taylor)
- Family: Tommy Johnson (brother-in-law)

James Brainard Taylor (January 28, 1927 – April 26, 2016) was one of the first African American principals in Los Angeles and went on to serve in the No. 2 position in the Los Angeles Unified School District (LAUSD).

== Background ==
James Brainard Taylor was the son of William Horace, a postman, and Louise Evangeline (Ponder) Taylor, a homemaker.

== Early education and career ==
Taylor graduated from Manual Arts High School in Los Angeles. From there he attended UCLA, where he received his bachelor's degree in mathematics. He also earned a master's degree in education at USC.

He served as a staff sergeant in the Army, where he taught math to fellow soldiers.

== Educator and school administrator ==
His first job at the Los Angeles Unified School District (LAUSD) was as a math teacher at John Adams Junior High (now John Adams Middle School). That was followed by a stint at Hamilton High School.

In 1957, Taylor moved into administration when he was hired as a vice principal at John H. Francis Polytechnic High School in Sun Valley. When the principal retired in 1962, Taylor was promoted to fill his position. This was the first time that a Black person was in charge of a high school in LAUSD with a predominantly white student body.

In 1967, he became the first principal of Alain LeRoy Locke High School in Watts.

After his assignment at Locke, Taylor became a deputy superintendent at LAUSD. This was during a time of a divisiveness within the district over the issue of integration. Taylor advocated for a measured approach to integration. He favored voluntary programs such as magnet schools to achieve integration.

After retiring from his post at LAUSD, he returned to Adams to teach math.

== Legacy ==
The Ánimo James B. Taylor Charter Middle School in Watts is named after him.
