= Lazarus (Shameless) =

- Shameless episode
- Episode no.: Season 4 Episode 12
- Directed by: Mark Mylod
- Written by: John Wells
- Cinematography by: Kevin McKnight
- Editing by: John M. Valerio
- Original release date: April 6, 2014
- Running time: 57 minutes

Guest appearances
- Joan Cusack as Sheila Jackson; Justin Chatwin as Jimmy Lishman; Emily Bergl as Samantha "Sammi" Slott; Regina King as Gail Johnson; Jeffrey Dean Morgan as Charlie Peters; Dichen Lachman as Woman; Morgan Lily as Bonnie; Isidora Goreshter as Svetlana; James Allen McCune as Matty Baker; Alessandra Balazs as Jackie Scabello; Nichole Sakura as Amanda; Merrin Dungey as Sister; Jim Hoffmaster as Kermit; Michael Patrick McGill as Tommy; DeLanna Studi as Doris Kendrick; Time Winters as Doctor

Episode chronology
| ← Previous "Emily" | Next → "Milk of the Gods" |
- Shameless season 4

"Lazarus" is the twelfth episode and season finale of the fourth season of the American television comedy drama Shameless, an adaptation of the British series of the same name. It is the 48th overall episode of the series and was written by series developer John Wells and directed by executive producer Mark Mylod. It originally aired on Showtime on April 6, 2014.

The series is set on the South Side of Chicago, Illinois, and depicts the poor, dysfunctional family of Frank Gallagher, a neglectful single father of six: Fiona, Phillip, Ian, Debbie, Carl, and Liam. He spends his days drunk, high, or in search of money, while his children need to learn to take care of themselves. In the episode, Frank discovers the side effects of his surgery, while Mickey worries for Ian's safety.

According to Nielsen Media Research, the episode was seen by an estimated 1.93 million household viewers and gained a 0.9 ratings share among adults aged 18–49. The episode received critical acclaim, who praised the performances (particularly Macy and Rossum), writing and emotional tone. For the episode, William H. Macy received a nomination for Outstanding Lead Actor in a Comedy Series at the 66th Primetime Emmy Awards.

== Plot ==
Frank (William H. Macy) awakens, recovered from his post-operative delirium. The doctor reveals that he will experience many side effects due to the transplant, and Frank is disappointed to learn that he cannot drink alcohol. Meanwhile, Sheila (Joan Cusack) clashes with Sammi (Emily Bergl) over their treatment of Frank, and warns Sammi she will have to leave her house due to the lack of space.

Svetlana (Isidora Goreshter) and Mickey (Noel Fisher) come to an understanding about their child and how to raise him; Svetlana is also willing to let Ian (Cameron Monaghan) be a part of Mickey's life if Mickey agrees to help take care of their baby. Mickey is worried when he finds Ian in a depressed state, unwilling to leave his bed nor answer to him. Fiona struggles to fit into prison and is also forced to take drug tests. Later, she is surprised when she is allowed to leave, and Gail (Regina King) picks her up. Gail reveals that she was released due to over-crowding, and that the level of severity in her crime compared to the other inmates is the reason why she was chosen to leave. She also gets Fiona a job as a waitress at the Golden House Restaurant, a diner managed by Charlie Peters (Jeffrey Dean Morgan), who will accompany her to her Narcotics Anonymous meetings.

Sheila visits the reservation to formally adopt Roger's children, but is shocked to discover that her petition has been denied; their great-grandfather will ultimately take care of the children. Carl (Ethan Cutkosky) grows attached to Bonnie (Morgan Lily), but she reiterates she does not want him to fall in love with her. Later, Carl is saddened to discover that she and her family have left. Following an initiation at Amanda's sorority, Lip (Jeremy Allen White) and Mandy (Emma Greenwell) run into each other at a restaurant, and Lip considers if he wasted an opportunity with her. Fiona returns home and tearfully reunites with Debbie (Emma Kenney) and Carl, who urge her to check up on Ian. After noticing Ian's depressed state, Fiona concludes that he may be bipolar like Monica. She wants to get him checked into a hospital, but Mickey refuses and states he will take care of him. Later, Fiona reunites with Lip and apologizes for her actions, having accepted that she cannot blame her decisions on her poor upbringing.

At the hospital, Sammi discovers that Sheila is preventing her from visiting Frank and initiates a fight with her. During this, Carl sneaks in and decides to get Frank checked out. They reach the edge of Lake Michigan; Frank drinks some alcohol and emotionally proclaims he is still alive. He then shares the bottle with Carl as they stare at the lake. That night, a car pulls up in front of the Gallagher house, and a woman (Dichen Lachman) asks the man if he wants to enter. The man, revealed to be Jimmy (Justin Chatwin), decides to wait before driving off.

== Production ==
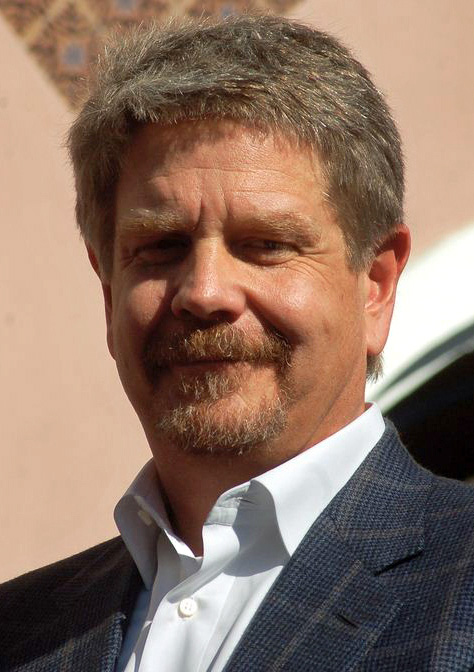
The episode was written by John Wells.

The episode was written by series developer John Wells and directed by executive producer Mark Mylod. It was Wells' ninth writing credit, and Mylod's 11th directing credit.

The episode's tag scene revealed the return of Jimmy Lishman, portrayed by Justin Chatwin, who was implied to have been killed off in the third season; Emmy Rossum and John Wells had both previously confirmed in a Television Academy panel that Jimmy's character was deceased. In an interview with The Hollywood Reporter, Chatwin revealed that the idea was developed by Wells and spoke of his character's return: "I guess there had been a lot of rallying from Emmy and the cast to bring back my character because [they] felt like something was missing — maybe some heart — that they felt our relationship brought out in the story. And I think there had been a rally from some fans who liked that character [too] and so John asked me, "How do you feel about this?" When he [explained the end of season four] to me, I got chills that just ran down my spine." The producers had Chatwin stay in a hotel during the filming of the finale in order to keep his return a secret from the main cast. During the live airing of the episode, numerous cast members expressed surprise over the character's return on Twitter, including Emmy Rossum, Steve Howey, Shanola Hampton, Emma Kenney and Emily Bergl. In an interview with Variety, Rossum expressed delight over Chatwin's return, stating "I was really happy about that because I had really campaigned hard to bring him back. I didn't feel like we had closed up that storyline well. So I'm very excited that he's back."

== Reception ==
=== Viewers ===
In its original American broadcast, "Lazarus" was seen by an estimated 1.93 million household viewers with a 0.9 in the 18–49 demographics. This means that 0.9 percent of all households with televisions watched the episode. This was a 9% increase in viewership from the previous episode, which was seen by an estimated 1.76 million household viewers with a 0.8 in the 18–49 demographics.

=== Critical reviews ===
"Lazarus" received critical acclaim. Alan Sepinwall of HitFix commended the dramatic elements of the episode, writing "So, no, not a ton of laughs in this season of Shameless. Just a lot of wonderful performances, patient character arcs and indelible moments. Call it a comedy, call it a drama, call it whatever; it's great, and this was probably my favorite season yet." Sepinwall spoke positively of the performances, particularly William H. Macy and Emma Kenney; speaking of the latter, Sepinwall wrote "Debbie's tears at seeing her big sister in the kitchen making breakfast were amazingly raw and real."

Carlo Sobral of Paste gave the episode an 8.8 out of 10 rating and wrote "When season four began, my expectations were lower than previous seasons. The way certain plotlines were headed, I didn't think I'd enjoy this season as much, but I was proven wrong. Credit to all those involved in the show, as this season of Shameless ends on a high note. I can't believe shows like this are allowed to make you wait more than half a year between seasons." Rosie Narasaki of Hollywood.com was mixed over Jimmy's return: "I was never a huge fan of Justin Chatwin's, and honestly wasn't too bothered that he was gone, especially since he had such an outlandish offing." Despite the ending, Narasaki was highly positive towards the rest of the episode, writing "After a fantastic season, Shameless delivers a (mostly) fantastic finale."

David Crow of Den of Geek gave the episode a 3 star rating out of 5 and wrote, "Season 4 might be the most uneven season of Shameless, but it feels like the most honest one. And that makes it more than a worthy collection for what is the best blend of comedy and drama on any current medium. We'll drink with Frank to that in sun, rain, or snow." Crow commended the performances, particularly Rossum, Kenney, and Macy; Crow also praised the conflict between Sheila and Sammi's characters, calling the storyline "comedy gold." Leigh Raines of TV Fanatic gave the episode a perfect 5 star rating out of 5, praising Fiona and Mickey's storylines, and concluding "I thought this episode was a great way to wrap up what has been an emotional season and it also left us wanting more for Shameless season 5."

In a more negative review, Joshua Alston of The A.V. Club gave the episode a "B–" grade. Alston praised the hopeful tone of Fiona and Ian's storylines, but was critical over the handling of Frank's story arc: "After three seasons of watching Frank leech off his family, and one season of watching him deal with the cumulative effect of his choices, it was a bit disappointing to see the reset button pressed and know it likely means a season five full of "Frank put something up his butt" jokes." Alston also panned the episode's tag scene, criticizing the decision to reintroduce Jimmy: "Honestly, it just sucks. It's unbelievably cheap, and it's heartbreaking to be left with that moment following a season in which Shameless largely outgrew the puerile instincts that defined its early years. [...] I can think of few maneuvers more immature than "The character who died off-screen is actually alive.""

=== Accolades ===
William H. Macy submitted the episode to support his nomination for Outstanding Lead Actor in a Comedy Series at the 66th Primetime Emmy Awards. He would lose to Jim Parsons for The Big Bang Theory.
