= The Line (2023 film) =

- Theatrical release poster
- Directed by: Ethan Berger
- Written by: Ethan Berger; Alex Russek; Zack Purdo
- Produced by: Alexandre Dauman; Jack Parker; Adam Paulsen; Lije Sarki
- Starring: Alex Wolff; Lewis Pullman; Halle Bailey; Austin Abrams; Angus Cloud; Bo Mitchell; Denise Richards; Cheri Oteri; Scoot McNairy; John Malkovich
- Cinematography: Stefan Weinberger
- Edited by: Ted Feldman
- Music by: Daniel Rossen
- Production companies: 1993; Big Cat Productions; The Brand Productions; Valparaiso Pictures
- Distributed by: Utopia
- Release dates: June 9, 2023 (Tribeca); November 8, 2024 (United States)
- Running time: 100 minutes
- Country: United States
- Language: English
- Box office: $37,774

The Line is a 2023 American coming-of-age drama film directed by Ethan Berger in his feature directorial debut, from a screenplay by Berger, Alex Russek, and Zack Purdo. Starring Alex Wolff, Lewis Pullman, Halle Bailey, Austin Abrams, Angus Cloud, Bo Mitchell, Denise Richards, Cheri Oteri, Scoot McNairy, and John Malkovich, the film follows several students at Sumpter College who pledge to become members of the prestigious Kappa Nu Alpha fraternity, led by charismatic president Todd Stevens (Pullman). Sophomore student Tom Backster (Wolff) begins questioning their strict adherence to tradition as he comes into conflict with his best friend Mitch Miller (Mitchell) and his unyielding loyalty to the fraternity, leading to consequences for everyone involved.

Principal photography began in Norman, Oklahoma on January 12, 2022, and concluded on February 3, with most of the film shot on location at the University of Oklahoma.

The Line premiered at the Tribeca Festival on June 9, 2023, and was theatrically released in the United States on November 8, 2024, to positive reviews, with particular praise for Wolff's performance. This was the last film to be released during Angus Cloud's lifetime, who died one month following the film's premiere.

== Plot ==
Tom Backster, a sophomore, is eager to leave home at the end of the summer and return to his fraternity, Kappa Nu Alpha (KNA). Mitch, Tom's best friend and roommate at the frathouse, is an obnoxious and temperamental slob, but his wealthy and connected father affords him a great deal of influence. Among the incoming group of freshman pledges, the rebellious and arrogant Gettys O'Brien quickly develops animosity with Mitch. Todd, the KNA president, favors accepting O'Brien into the frat, while Mitch opposes.

At a lecture, Tom notices Annabelle, a studious and reserved classmate. Despite his friends mocking her, Tom approaches Annabelle on multiple occasions and initiates conversation. Eventually, they begin a casual relationship. The new Dean of Student Affairs meets with Todd and Tom and warns them about the fraternity's student conduct violations. He forbids them from engaging in hazing and holding off-campus retreats. Later, Todd suggests that Tom should take on more of a leadership role within the frat. Meanwhile, the bitterness between Gettys and Mitch escalates. Tom continues seeing Annabelle but hesitates to let her visit the frat.

Despite the Dean's warning, Mitch plans a retreat at his family's lake house. Todd cannot attend and leaves Tom in charge, urging him to keep Mitch under control and to avoid hazing. When Mitch is unable to hire strippers for the party, the sophomore brothers decide to haze the pledges out of boredom. Tom is reluctant but eventually goes along.

Gettys alone rejects the hazing rituals. Having run out of patience, the sophomores proceed to make an example out of him, leaving Gettys as the final pledge to be brought into the garage and tested. Tom and Mitch's circle of brothers take turns attempting to intimidate Gettys, who exchanges insults with them. A fight breaks out, with Mitch ultimately striking Gettys to the ground and killing him, which stuns the group. Tom suggests calling 911; the others resist and tell him he shares the blame.

A plan is coordinated to dispose of Gettys' body. The sophomores load the freshmen onto a pontoon boat with bags over their heads as if part of another ritual. In the confusion, they dump Gettys into the lake and stage it as an accident. Later, the authorities are unable to locate his body.

Tom is questioned by police but doesn't give up any information. He later confesses to Annabelle that Gettys was dead before they all boarded the boat, saying he has come to trust her. She rebuffs him and he leaves in tears. All the sophomores involved in the incident are expelled, including Tom.

Two years later, Tom is shown doing well at a community college in his hometown while working as a bartender. Mitch shows up at Tom's bar and attempts to reconnect. Tom politely refuses, recognizing that Mitch has not changed. The film ends with Tom eating pasta with his mother; he tells her that he appreciates her as the TV in the background shows a news report that there has been a pledge found dead due to hazing and that there has been a pledge hazing death every year since 1969.

== Cast ==
- Alex Wolff as Tom Backster
- Lewis Pullman as Todd Stevens
- Halle Bailey as Annabelle Bascom
- Austin Abrams as Gettys O'Brien
- Angus Cloud as Robert DeWitt
- Bo Mitchell as Mitch Miller
- Denise Richards as Leanne
- Cheri Oteri as Jackie Backster
- Scoot McNairy as Detective
- John Malkovich as Beach Miller
- Will Ropp as Bayne Ellis
- Graham Patrick Martin as Connor Murphy
- Nicholas Basille as Frank Vitti
- Drew Pipkin as Bill Roberts

== Production ==
In March 2019, it was announced that Wolff would star in the film along with Malkovich, McNairy, Jessica Barden and Pullman.

== Release ==
The film premiered at the Tribeca Festival on June 9, 2023. In May 2024, Utopia acquired distribution rights to the film and scheduled it for a select release on October 18, 2024, before expanding on October 23, 2024.

== Reception ==
On the review aggregator website Rotten Tomatoes, 79% of 52 critics' reviews are positive, with an average rating of 7/10. The website's consensus reads: "By turning a chillingly clinical gaze onto the class striving and Faustian bargains of campus life, The Line hazes its audience to thrilling effect." Metacritic, which uses a weighted average, assigned the film a score of 74 out of 100, based on 10 critics, indicating "generally favorable" reviews.

Taylor Gates of Collider graded the film a B+ and wrote, "It’s a sophisticated commentary wrapped up in a beer-soaked package and is sure to linger with you long after the credits roll." Murtada Efadl of Variety gave the film a positive review and wrote, "As Tom’s world crumbles, Wolff adapts his performance, which becomes more raw, adding sensitivity and disillusionment." Lovia Gyarkye of The Hollywood Reporter also gave the film a positive review and wrote, "Enthralling even when it doesn't go deep."

Samantha Bergeson of IndieWire graded the film an A−, calling it "absolutely one of the most accurate films about fraternity life ever made." Chad Collins of Dread Central awarded the film four stars out of five, calling it a "terrifying debut from director Ethan Berger." Pete Hammond of Deadline Hollywood also gave the film a positive review and wrote, "The deck is stacked in The Line, but the ultimate message (which is you are best to steer clear of the frat world at all costs) comes through loud and clear."
