= Angus Cloud =

American actor (1998–2023)

- Cloud in 2019
- Born: Conor Angus Cloud Hickey; July 10, 1998; Oakland, California, U.S.
- Died: July 31, 2023 (aged 25); Oakland, California, U.S.
- Occupation: Actor
- Years active: 2019–2023

Conor Angus Cloud Hickey (July 10, 1998 – July 31, 2023) was an American actor. He was best known for his role as Fezco O'Neill in the HBO drama series Euphoria (2019–2022), and had roles in the films North Hollywood (2021), The Line (2023), Abigail and The Garfield Movie (both 2024). He also appeared in music videos by Noah Cyrus, Juice Wrld, Becky G, and Karol G. At age 25, Cloud died from a drug overdose in his family’s home in Oakland, California in 2023.

== Early life ==
Conor Angus Cloud Hickey was born on July 10, 1998, to Conor Hickey and Lisa Cloud McLaughlin. He grew up in Oakland, California and was the pre-fame star of a 2017 video-blog interview at Peet's Coffee in Oakland by noted Oakland Vlogger Zennie Abraham. He was of Irish descent, with the majority of his family still residing in Ireland. He had younger twin sisters, Molly and Fiona. He attended the School of Production Design at Oakland School for the Arts, where he was a classmate of his future Euphoria co-star Zendaya. Cloud said that he suffered "minor brain damage" after falling into a construction pit in a poorly-lit street in the downtown area of Oakland in 2013. The accident resulted in a scar on the left side of his head.

== Career ==
While working at Woodland restaurant close to the Barclays Center in Brooklyn, New York City, Cloud was scouted by Euphoria casting director Jennifer Venditti; he initially thought she was trying to scam him. In the series, he portrayed Fezco O'Neill, a kindhearted drug dealer who often provided moral guidance to some of the main characters in the series. The Wall Street Journal described the character as a "lovable drug dealer". His role was expanded in the second season. He had never acted prior to his role on Euphoria, with his only experience in the field having been when he built sets and worked on lighting and sound for his high school's theatre department.

In 2019, Cloud appeared as himself in the streaming Adult Swim television series The Perfect Women. He also appeared in three music videos. In 2020, he appeared in Noah Cyrus's music video for "All Three". In 2021, he played Walker in the comedy drama film North Hollywood. In 2022, he appeared in two music videos for Juice Wrld's "Cigarettes" and for Becky G and Karol G's "Mamiii" music videos. In 2023, he appeared in the film The Line, portraying Robert DeWitt. That same year, he signed with United Talent Agency (UTA).

Cloud had roles in three films which were unreleased at the time of his death: the horror films Your Lucky Day and Abigail, and the comedy film Freaky Tales. It was confirmed that he had completed work on Your Lucky Day and Abigail before he died with the latter being dedicated to his memory. Prior to his death, he was supposed to star in the film adaptation of The Things They Carried, Tim O'Brien's short story collection recounting events of the Vietnam War. It was revealed later that he provided voice-over work for The Garfield Movie, which was released following his death and dedicated to his memory.

== Death ==
Cloud was found dead in his family's house in Oakland, California, on July 31, 2023, at the age of 25. The cause of death was a multiple drug overdose – a lethal mix of methamphetamine, fentanyl, cocaine, and benzodiazepines, the Alameda County Coroner's Bureau told NBC News in September 2023. His mother said his last words to her before his death were "I love you, mama. You're the best. I'll see you in the morning".

Cloud was interred at Mountain View Cemetery in Oakland. To pay tribute, Euphoria's director Sam Levinson used archived footage of Cloud's character in the series finale, "In God We Trust".

== Filmography ==
=== Film ===
List of films and roles
Year	Title	Role	Notes	Ref.
2021	North Hollywood	Walker		
2023	The Line	Robert DeWitt		
2023	Your Lucky Day	Sterling	Posthumous release	
2024	Freaky Tales	Travis	Posthumous release	
2024	Abigail	Dean	Posthumous release	
2024	The Garfield Movie	Snickers (voice)	Posthumous release	

=== Television ===
List of television appearances and roles
Year	Title	Role	Notes	Ref.
2019–2022	Euphoria	Fezco O'Neill	Main role (seasons 1–2)	
2019	The Perfect Woman	Himself	Cameo	

=== Music videos ===
List of music videos
Year	Title	Artist	Director	Ref.
2020	"All Three"	Noah Cyrus	Tyler Shields	
2022	"Cigarettes"	Juice Wrld	Steve Cannon	
2022	"Mamiii"	Becky G and Karol G	Mike Ho	
