= Emily (Shameless) =

- Shameless episode
- Episode no.: Season 4 Episode 11
- Directed by: Anthony Hemingway
- Written by: Nancy M. Pimental
- Cinematography by: Kevin McKnight
- Editing by: Tim Tommasino
- Original release date: March 30, 2014
- Running time: 49 minutes

Guest appearances
- Joan Cusack as Sheila Jackson; Emily Bergl as Samantha "Sammi" Slott; Austin Abrams as Henry McNally; Morgan Lily as Bonnie; Dennis Cockrum as Terry Milkovich; Isidora Goreshter as Svetlana; James Allen McCune as Matty Baker; Nichole Sakura as Amanda; Emy Coligado as Wesley Gretzky; Alyson Croft as Frank's RN; Suzanne Cryer as Cheryl; Ian Kahn as Jason; Heather McComb as Wendy; Aubrey Miller as Emily; Teresa Ornelas as Ellie; Danika Yarosh as Holly Herkimer; Time Winters as Doctor

Episode chronology
| ← Previous "Liver, I Hardly Know Her" | Next → "Lazarus" |
- Shameless season 4

"Emily" is the eleventh episode of the fourth season of the American television comedy drama Shameless, an adaptation of the British series of the same name. It is the 47th overall episode of the series and was written by executive producer Nancy M. Pimental and directed by Anthony Hemingway. It originally aired on Showtime on March 30, 2014.

The series is set on the South Side of Chicago, Illinois, and depicts the poor, dysfunctional family of Frank Gallagher, a neglectful single father of six: Fiona, Phillip, Ian, Debbie, Carl, and Liam. He spends his days drunk, high, or in search of money, while his children need to learn to take care of themselves. In the episode, Frank bonds with a little girl at the hospital, while Mickey is pressured by Ian over the status of their relationship.

According to Nielsen Media Research, the episode was seen by an estimated 1.76 million household viewers and gained a 0.8 ratings share among adults aged 18–49. The episode received critical acclaim, with critics praising Frank and Mickey's storylines and emotional tone.

== Plot ==
For violating her probation, Fiona (Emmy Rossum) is driven on a prison bus to a correctional facility for a 90-day sentence. At the facility, Fiona is forced to adapt to her new life, struggling to adjust with the lack of privacy and the dynamics of the prison. Frank (William H. Macy) is revealed to have had a successful liver transplant surgery, although he remains unconscious. Next to him, a little girl named Emily (Aubrey Miller) is awaiting a heart transplant as she suffers cardiomyopathy.

Mickey (Noel Fisher) reluctantly attends his child's christening, although Svetlana (Isidora Goreshter) is upset that Ian (Cameron Monaghan) crashed the ceremony. They host a celebration at the Alibi Room, with Terry (Dennis Cockrum) joining after being paroled from prison. Svetlana demands that Ian leave, but Ian states he will end his affair with Mickey if he leaves and calls him a coward for never coming out. Before Ian leaves, Mickey finally reveals his homosexuality. This causes Terry to attack him, and Ian joins in to defend Mickey. Terry is sent back to prison, while Mickey is spared by a gay police officer. At school, Debbie (Emma Kenney) is approached by her classmate Henry (Austin Abrams), who shares her interests. Henry tries to initiate a sexual encounter with Debbie, but this is revealed to be a ruse set up by Matty's girlfriend, who circulates images of the prank online. Matty (James Allen McCune) later consoles Debbie over the prank and offers to accompany her to the school dance, which she accepts.

Frank finally awakens, although he mistakes Sheila for his mother, Carl (Ethan Cutkosky) for Lip, and Sammi (Emily Bergl) for Debbie. The doctor explains that the high level of sedatives used will temporarily affect his perception of reality, and asks Sheila and Sammi to be patient with him. After they leave, Frank starts talking with Emily, mistaking her for Fiona, and apologizes for being a bad father. Realizing his state, Emily plays along and they bond. Meanwhile, Lip (Jeremy Allen White) prepares to meet with Amanda (Nichole Sakura) and her parents for dinner. As Amanda wants the dinner to be as disastrous as possible, Lip allows Carl to get Bonnie's siblings around the house. However, the social worker arrives for a surprise visit, and Lip makes a bad impression. During dinner, Lip displays many of the family's worst qualities, disgusting her parents. Despite the weak state of the house, the social worker admires Lip's determination in watching Bonnie's siblings and approves her visit.

Amanda's father ultimately pays $10,000 to Lip to stop dating Amanda, which he agrees to. Upset, Amanda breaks up with Lip in front of her parents, but this is later revealed to be a ploy, and the two resume dating. Frank leaves his hospital room for food, getting a doctor to give him his cake. When he returns and is placed back on his bed, he overhears a doctor pronouncing Emily as dead. As she is taken away from the room, Frank sadly refers to her as Fiona.

== Production ==
The episode was written by executive producer Nancy M. Pimental and directed by Anthony Hemingway. It was Pimental's 11th writing credit, and Hemingway's fourth directing credit.

== Reception ==
=== Viewers ===
In its original American broadcast, "Emily" was seen by an estimated 1.76 million household viewers with a 0.8 in the 18–49 demographics. This means that 0.8 percent of all households with televisions watched the episode. This was a 7% increase in viewership from the previous episode, which was seen by an estimated 1.63 million household viewers with a 0.8 in the 18–49 demographics.

=== Critical reviews ===
"Emily" received critical acclaim. Joshua Alston of The A.V. Club gave the episode an "A–" grade and wrote, "One of the markers of a great television show is that its world is so skillfully rendered that it can shift focus between characters without feeling like it's grasping or becoming unmoored. Shameless didn't have that quality in its early going. It was so intently focused on Fiona and her push-and-pull dynamic with Steve that there was a strict narrative hierarchy. The show has evolved since then, but never at a more dramatic pace than in season four, and "Emily" offers compelling proof that the metamorphosis is complete." Alston commended the scene between Frank and Emily, calling it "the most surprising and most satisfying scene" and "one of the most touching things Shameless has ever done." Alston also commented highly on Mickey's coming out scene, praising the execution and expressing interest in how the storyline will develop in the future.

Carlo Sobral of Paste gave the episode a 9 out of 10 rating and wrote "Although I had a few small complaints, "Emily" had some incredibly powerful character moments and accomplished a lot in terms of plot, giving Shameless viewers plenty to think about heading into next week's season finale." Sobral praised Noel Fisher's portrayal of Mickey: "Fisher has often stolen the show as Mickey lately, and "Emily" stands out as his finest performance to date." Rosie Narasaki of Hollywood.com praised the Frank and Emily scenes, and wrote of the episode's ending, "It's not a surprise when her flat-lining gurney is carted away, but she serves to create a beautiful tableau for Shameless' least beautiful character."

David Crow of Den of Geek gave the episode a 3.5 star rating out of 5 and wrote, "For some, it may therefore be one of the season's best. However, it all felt a little too convenient for me in the plotting to be one of the year's best Shameless episodes. It was one of the funniest though (until it wasn't) with a killer ending, so I can't be too harsh on the contrivances used to create it." Crow also commended Fisher's performance, writing "Mickey has never shown more complexity in what is arguably the best performance of the season. With the ties of a sham marriage threaten to strangle him to death, as well as Ian's accelerated rip from the closet mandate, the wordless hesitation Fisher never has to verbalize in each scene has been a highlight." Leigh Raines of TV Fanatic gave the episode a perfect 5 star rating out of 5, and wrote, "When Mickey and Frank are the ones completely surprising you, that's how you know it was a great installment of Shameless."
