= Cinema Cool =

American web series

- Genre: Web series
- Created by: Travis Baker; Richard Tanne; Joe Lindquist
- Written by: Travis Baker
- Directed by: Joe Lindquist
- Starring: Richard Tanne
- Country of origin: United States
- Original language: English

Production
- Producer: Travis Baker
- Running time: Varies

Cinema Cool is an American web series that was created by Travis Baker, Richard Tanne and Joe Lindquist. Baker wrote and produced, Lindquist edited and directed, and Tanne hosted. The show took a humorous look at mostly retro movies from the 1980s and prior.

== Premise ==
Cinema Cool used a variety of episode formats to get across their passion for film. They synopsized and reviewed films as varied as Adventures in Babysitting and The Monster Squad, traced the development of horror films over the past 50 years, and interviewed Night of the Living Dead director George A. Romero.

== Production ==
Baker, Tanne, and Lindquist filled in the writer, director, producer, editor, and host roles. Though the show stopped production in 2011, they released one additional episode in 2014, a tribute to slasher films.

The makers of Cinema Cool also hosted midnight screenings at the Nuart Theatre in Los Angeles, including showings of Die Hard and Christine.

== Reception ==
The show received attention and recognition from mostly horror film websites. Dread Central described the show as "a group of lovably loony horror fans." Horror Society described the show as "wildly popular from 2010 to 2011."
