= Phil Parmet =

American cinematographer and producer

- Born: Philip Alan Parmet; March 7, 1942 (age 84); Princeton, New Jersey, United States
- Occupations: Cinematographer, still photographer, producer
- Years active: 1975–present
- Known for: Grindhouse, Four Rooms, Halloween, The Devil's Rejects
- Spouse: Lisa Parmet
- Children: Laurel Parmet

Philip Alan Parmet (born March 7, 1942) is an American cinematographer, still photographer, and producer.

== Career ==
Parmet began his career as a cinematographer for documentary films. His first successes were The Song Remains The Same about Led Zeppelin, Baby Snakes about Frank Zappa, and the Academy Award-winning He Makes Me Feel Like Dancin' featuring Kevin Kline.

His first feature film credits include In the Soup (starring Steve Buscemi), Distant Justice (starring David Carradine), Two Small Bodies (starring Fred Ward and Suzy Amis), Cyborg 3 (starring Malcolm McDowell), Nina Takes A Lover (starring Laura San Giacomo), Quentin Tarantino's Four Rooms (starring Antonio Banderas and Bruce Willis), as well as The Last Days of Frankie the Fly (starring Kiefer Sutherland).

More notable credits include Black & White, Hard Cash, Dallas 362, Lonesome Jim, The Devil's Rejects, Halloween, Blue State, Grindhouse, The Roommate, Six Bullets, and The Possession of Michael King.

== Personal life ==
Parmet is married to costume designer Lisa Parmet, with whom he has a daughter, filmmaker Laurel Parmet.
