= Krystal Sutherland =

Australian author (born 1990)

- Born: 1990 (age 35–36)
- Occupation: novelist
- Period: 4 October 2016–30 January 2024
- Genre: Fiction
- Notable works: Our Chemical Hearts

Website
- www.krystalsutherland.com

Krystal Sutherland (born 1990) is an Australian writer. She is best known for her first novel, Our Chemical Hearts, and her third novel, House of Hollow, which is listed on The New York Times Best Seller list.

== Biography ==
Sutherland was born and raised in Townsville, Australia. She has lived in multiple big cities across the world; in Sydney, where she edited her university's student magazine; in Amsterdam, where she worked as a foreign correspondent; and Hong Kong, where she finished her degree. Currently, she is living in London.

While attending high school Sutherland wanted to be an actress. In 2016, she published her first novel, Our Chemical Hearts, which was made in a feature film in 2020 by Amazon Studios.

Her novel, House of Hollow, was nominated for the Yoto Carnegie Medal in 2022.

Her 2024 novel, The Invocations, was shortlisted for the Ethel Turner Prize for Young People's Literature at the 2025 NSW Premier's Literary Awards.

The Invocations won the 2025 Prime Minister's Literary Award for young adult literature.

== Film adaptations ==
In 2020, Amazon Studios released a feature film of the novel Our Chemical Hearts, titled Chemical Hearts, starring Lili Reinhart and Austin Abrams. Her second novel, A Semi-Definitive List of Worst Nightmares, has been optioned for adaptation by Yellow Bird US.

== Bibliography ==
- Our Chemical Hearts (2016)
- A Semi-Definitive List of Worst Nightmares (2017)
- House of Hollow (2021)
- The Invocations (2024)
