= Richard Tanne =

American actor

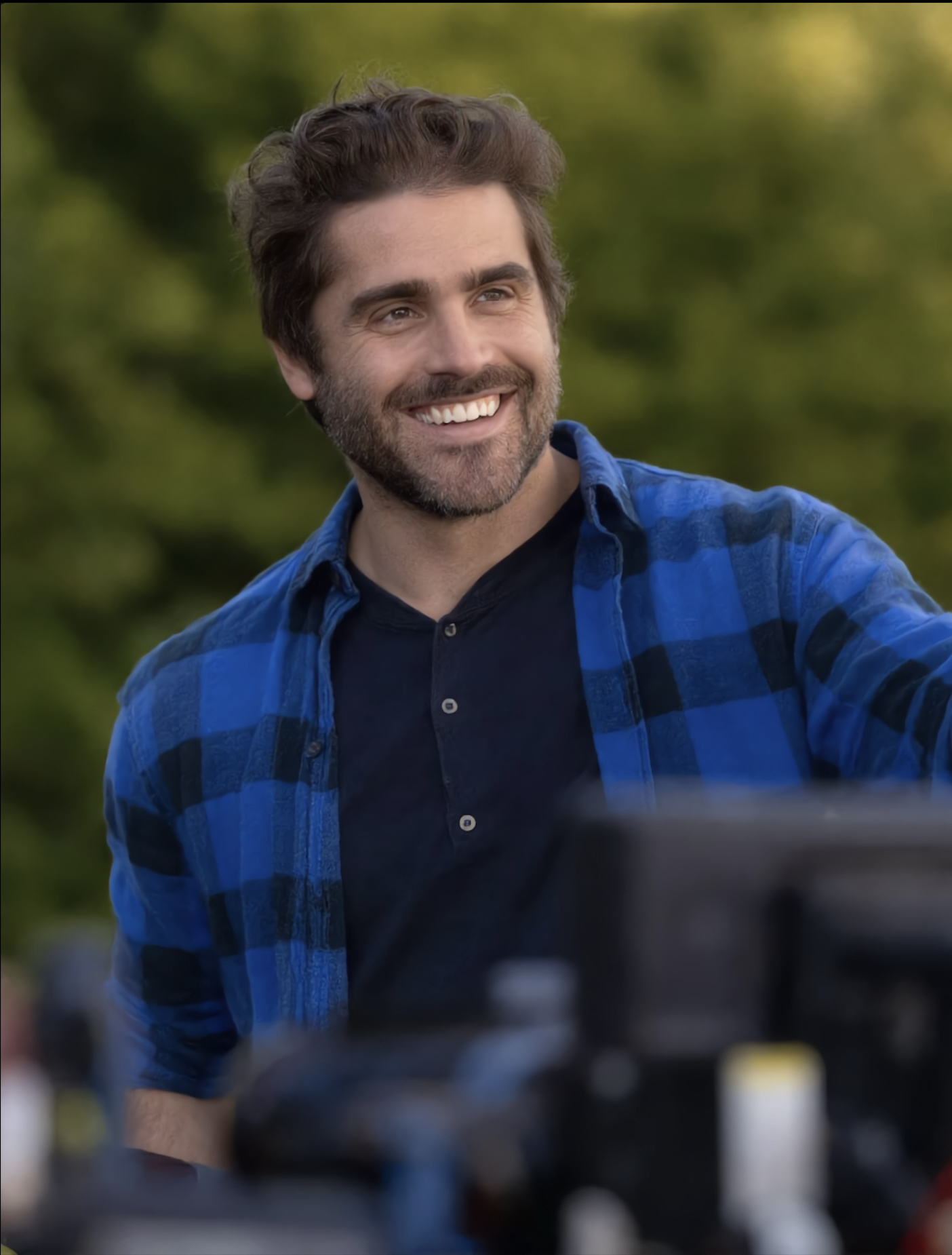
- Tanne in 2025
- Born: February 4, 1985 (age 41); Livingston, New Jersey, U.S.
- Education: State University of New York, Purchase (BFA)
- Occupations: Director; screenwriter; producer; actor
- Years active: 2005–present
- Notable work: Southside with You (2016) Chemical Hearts (2020)
- Spouse: Joy Shi (m. 2021)

Richard Tanne (born February 4, 1985) is an American film director, screenwriter, producer, and actor. He is known for writing and directing the films Southside with You (2016) and Chemical Hearts (2020).

Southside with You premiered at the Sundance Film Festival to critical acclaim and received numerous accolades including a Gotham Award nomination for Breakthrough Director and the Rotten Tomatoes Award for the best-reviewed romance of the year.

In 2020, Tanne released his second feature film, the Amazon Studios drama Chemical Hearts. It received positive reviews. He has also served as a staff writer for Pixar Animation Studios.

== Early life ==
Tanne was born and raised in the township of Livingston, New Jersey. He attended Livingston High School, graduating in 2003. He was raised Jewish.

As a teenager, Tanne's writing led to him being the recipient of the New Jersey Governor's Award for Excellence in Arts Education for playwriting. Following his initial success as a teenage writer, Tanne was announced as the winner of the Young Playwrights Inc. National Playwriting Competition, which was founded by Stephen Sondheim. Other recipients include filmmaker Kenneth Lonergan and playwright Rebecca Gilman.

== Career ==
=== 2010–2014: Early work ===
Tanne became the host of Cinema Cool in 2010, and was also a co-creator of the movie talk show. His first major role as an actor came in 2011 in the TV movie, Swamp Shark. The film aired in 2011 on the SyFy Channel. He produced the Lionsgate horror film Mischief Night (2014) and played a lead role in the 2014 independent film Worst Friends, co-starring Kristen Connolly and Cody Horn.

=== 2016: Breakthrough and success ===
In December 2014, it was announced that Tanne would make his feature directorial debut on the romance film Southside with You, for which he also wrote the script. The film is based on the first date of American President Barack Obama and his wife Michelle Obama, in Chicago, Illinois in 1989. Around the same time, Tika Sumpter was announced as cast in the role of Michelle Obama, and also co-produced. Principal photography on the film began on July 13, 2015, on location in Chicago, and wrapped on July 31, 2015.

Southside with You premiered in the U.S. Dramatic Competition at the 2016 Sundance Film Festival to critical acclaim and received numerous awards and nominations. It was released in North American theaters on August 26, 2016.

In October 2017, Deadline Hollywood reported that Tanne sold a genre pitch to Sony Pictures in a bidding war. Though the plot was not disclosed, Tanne is set to write and direct the film. It was also reported that he will next direct an original screenplay entitled Vienna. Tanne also spent two years writing an unannounced movie for Pixar.

=== 2020-present ===
On June 14, 2019, Amazon Studios announced that production was underway in New Jersey on Chemical Hearts, a teenage coming-of-age, romance drama with Tanne writing, directing and producing and Lili Reinhart starring and executive producing. Tanne adapted the screenplay from Krystal Sutherland's novel, Our Chemical Hearts. The film was released on Amazon Prime to generally positive reviews on August 21, 2020.

On April 8, 2026, Deadline Hollywood reported that Tanne had founded CineBridge, a Film Independent fellowship designed to support international filmmakers whose work reflects strong creative vision and the potential to connect with audiences in the United States and beyond. With support from a $1.1 million gift from the Estate of Samuel and Ruth P. Cohen, Tanne would continue to help select, mentor and support the fellows.

== Personal life ==
Tanne married Joy Shi on January 18, 2021, in Joshua Tree, California.

== Filmography ==
=== Film ===
Year	Title	Credited as		
Year	Title	Director	Producer	Writer
2016	Southside with You	Yes	Yes	Yes
2020	Chemical Hearts	Yes	Yes	Yes

==== Producer only ====
- Mischief Night (2014)
- Worst Friends (2014)

==== Acting Roles ====
Year	Title	Role	Type	Notes
2005	2001 Maniacs	Additional Maniac	Feature Film	
2011	Cinema Cool	Host	Web Series	Also co-creator
2011	Knifepoint	Rick	Feature Film	
2011	Swamp Shark	Tyler	TV movie	SyFy Original Film
2011	The Nine Lives of Chloe King	Cody	TV series	Episode: "Responsible"
2014	Worst Friends	Jake Kittner	Feature Film	Also producer
