= Laurel Parmet =

American filmmaker

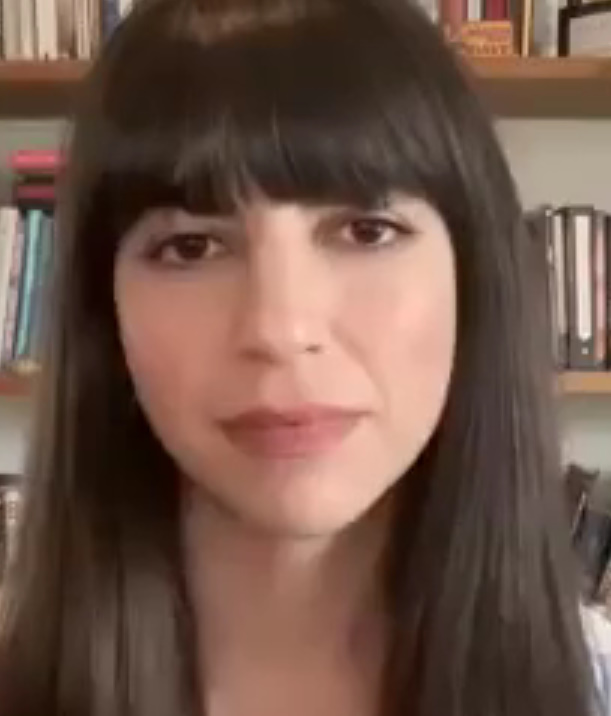
- Parmet in 2023
- Born: Laurel Akira Parmet; May 31, 1989 (age 37); Los Angeles, California, United States
- Education: New York University Tisch School of the Arts (MFA)
- Occupation: Filmmaker
- Years active: 2011–present
- Father: Phil Parmet

Laurel Akira Parmet (born May 31, 1989) is an American filmmaker. She made her directorial debut with the coming-of-age drama film The Starling Girl (2023), for which she was nominated for the Grand Jury Prize at the 2023 Sundance Film Festival and the Independent Spirit Award for Best First Screenplay.

== Early life and education ==
Parmet was born in Los Angeles, California, to cinematographer Phil Parmet and costume designer Lisa Parmet. She graduated from New York University Tisch School of the Arts.

== Career ==
In 2017, Parmet directed Spring, a short film revolving around a young woman taking pictures of her best friend. It had its world premiere at South by Southwest. In 2018, Parmet directed Kira Burning, a short film revolving around a teenager attempting to take revenge after a heartbreaking betrayal by her best friend.

In 2023, Parmet made her directorial debut with The Starling Girl starring Eliza Scanlen and Lewis Pullman. It had its world premiere at the 2023 Sundance Film Festival in January 2023, and was acquired by Bleecker Street.

== Filmography ==
Year	Title	Director	Writer	Notes
2017	Spring	Yes	Yes	Short film
2018	Kira Burning	Yes	Yes	Short film
2023	The Starling Girl	Yes	Yes	Executive producer
