= Her Smell (soundtrack) =

2019 film soundtrack album

Her Smell (Original Motion Picture Soundrack)

Film score by Keegan DeWitt and Alicia Bognanno
- Released: August 30, 2019
- Recorded: 2018
- Genre: Film score
- Length: 84:21
- Label: Waxwork
- Producers: Keegan DeWitt; Alicia Bognanno

Keegan DeWitt chronology
The Long Dumb Road (2018)	Her Smell (2019)	Human Nature (2019)

Her Smell (Original Motion Picture Soundrack) is the soundtrack album to the 2019 film Her Smell directed by Alex Ross Perry starring Elisabeth Moss, Cara Delevingne, Dan Stevens, Agyness Deyn, Gayle Rankin, Ashley Benson, Amber Heard, Dylan Gelula, Eka Darville and Lindsay Burdge. The album featured original score composed by Keegan DeWitt and original music composed by Alicia Bognanno with performances by the cast. Both the albums were released through Waxwork Records in a triple vinyl LP on August 30, 2019.

== Development ==
=== Original score ===
DeWitt had previously collaborated with Perry on Listen Up Philip (2014), Queen of Earth (2015) and Golden Exits (2017). He explained that the score was intentionally designed to create relentless anxiety and place audiences in an almost panic-like state, particularly during the film's opening backstage sequences. Rather than relying on conventional orchestral music, DeWitt blended ggressive electronic textures and sampled and manipulated it with the background noise and sound design such as the noise from the crowd, radio chatter, muffled voices, and environmental sounds. DeWitt collaborated closely with director Alex Ross Perry and editor Robert Greene, providing both complete cues and isolated stems that were extensively rearranged in the editing process. Perry's original inspiration came from The Phantom of the Opera, aiming for recurring musical motifs that gradually evolved throughout the film.

DeWitt sought to create a score that remained distinct from the fictional band's music by avoiding traditional rock instrumentation. Instead, he combined computer-driven rhythms with organic recordings, including footsteps in snow, distant dogs barking, pipe organs, radio static, and modular synthesizers, constantly blurring the line between acoustic and electronic sounds. He cited influences such as Magnolia (1999), Punch-Drunk Love (2002) and the experimental philosophy of John Cage, describing the goal as updating those ideas with a more modern, fragmented aesthetic. Every musical element was performed, recorded, or manipulated by DeWitt himself using modular synthesizers, tape recordings, and sampled instruments.

Drawing on his own experience touring with a band, DeWitt noted that real backstage environments are typically quiet and mundane, so he instead emphasized their psychological atmosphere. The score uses muffled low-frequency sounds that are felt as much as heard, while unsettling details such as radio static and reversed cymbals represent the protagonist's deteriorating mental state. One notable exception occurs during a peaceful scene at Becky's home, where the absence of music symbolizes her brief emotional equilibrium. As soon as she leaves, however, the score returns, reinforcing the idea that an inescapable inner force continues to drive and haunt her, making the music a representation of her unresolved psychological struggle.

=== Original music ===
Alicia Bognanno, frontwoman of the band Bully, wrote the original songs performed by the fictional grunge band Something She after being recommended to Perry by DeWitt. Perry provided her with the script and asked her to write songs from the perspective of Becky Something, the troubled lead singer portrayed by Elisabeth Moss. With few creative restrictions, Bognanno drew inspiration from the script and Becky's emotional state, while avoiding direct imitation of artists such as Hole despite inevitable comparisons to Courtney Love.

The songwriting process unfolded over several months, with Perry and Moss reviewing each composition before providing feedback. Bognanno tailored the songs to suit Moss's vocal range, avoiding the aggressive screaming style she often uses with Bully. To help Moss learn the music, she recorded videos of her guitar playing so the actress could study the finger placements with a guitar teacher. Although writing the songs was straightforward, the collaborative revisions and production process took considerably longer.

Handing the songs over to another performer was initially challenging for Bognanno, as she had never relinquished creative control of her work before. However, once the songs became part of the film, she no longer viewed them as her own but as Becky Something's, embracing them as creations for a fictional character rather than for Bully. She described the experience as a rewarding creative exercise that allowed her to step outside her own perspective and write for someone else's story, and she hopes to continue writing music for fictional characters in the future.

== Release ==
The original soundtrack that consisted of DeWitt's score and Bognanno's original music was released in a triple LP record through Waxwork Records on August 30, 2019. DeWitt's score was released as a double album on both 180-gram vinyl LPs, both black and pink colored, while the original song album was separately released in a 7'' white vinyl LP.

== Reception ==
Tomris Laffly of RogerEbert.com wrote "Keegan DeWitt's ominous score pump[s] through the veins of Her Smell in uniform but atonal beats." Margaret Farrell of GQ said that the film is "dispersed noise in the background and muffled music of a throbbing venue thanks to Keegan DeWitt's sound. It's a sensory overload that has become Something She's norm." Emily Yoshida of Vulture called it an "unsettling score" which could "easily be mistaken for diegetic sound design, or even just the actual noise picked up in the low-ceilinged space under a rock venue".

Hannah Strong of Little White Lies called it a "Keegan DeWitt's scratchy electric score echoes in your ears". David Ehrlich of IndieWire wrote "Keegan DeWitt's queasy, bass-heavy score pounds through the ceiling, like the entire first half of the movie takes place on the floor below the loudest house party of all time." Justin Chang of Los Angeles Times called it a "rumble and eerie electronic" score from DeWitt. Betsy Sherman of The Arts Fuse wrote "The score by Keegan DeWitt includes a low, chaotic-seeming musical rumble that fiddles with our viscera."

Zach Schonfeld of Vice wrote "The film's original songs stand in contrast to its actual score, a throbbing, atonal nightmare that blends in with the incidental sound design to the point that the two are occasionally indistinguishable. It's the kind of score that can spike your anxiety level before you notice it's there." Adam Graham of The Detroit News described it as a "sludgy, gurgling score, which is as uneasy as an upset stomach".

== Track listing ==
=== Original score ===
Side A
No.	Title	Length
1.	"Prologue"	1:17
2.	"Act I: Holiday Ballroom (End of the Tour)"	18:57
Total length:		20:14

Side B
No.	Title	Length
1.	"Mari"	1:57
2.	"Act II: Record-O-Saurus Trax Studios (Enter the Akergirls), Part 1"	4:41
3.	"Act II: Record-O-Saurus Trax Studios (Exit Something She), Part 2"	3:45
Total length:		10:23

Side C
No.	Title	Length
1.	"Act III: In the Bowels of the Bingo Lounge"	20:58
Total length:		20:58

Side D
No.	Title	Length
1.	"Act IV and V: Exterior Becky's House (Return to the Holiday Ballroom)"	23:05
2.	"The End"	1:40
Total length:		24:45

=== Original songs ===
All tracks are written by Alicia Bognanno.

Side A
No.	Title	Artist(s)	Length
1.	"Breathe"	Elisabeth Moss	1:54
2.	"Pulled Down"	Cara Delevingne; Ashley Benson; Dylan Gelula	1:58
Total length:			3:52

All tracks are written by Alicia Bognanno.

Side B
No.	Title	Artist(s)	Length
1.	"Can't Wait"	Elisabeth Moss	2:10
2.	"Control"	Elisabeth Moss; Agyness Deyn; Gayle Rankin; Cara Delevingne; Ashley Benson; Dylan Gelula; Amber Heard	1:59
Total length:			4:09
