= Cha Cha Real Smooth (EP) =

Cha Cha Real Smooth (Soundtrack from the Apple Original Film)

EP by Este Haim and Chris Stracey
- Released: June 17, 2022
- Recorded: 2022
- Genre: Film score
- Length: 16:24
- Label: Columbia
- Producer: Este Haim; Chris Stracey

Este Haim chronology
Maid (2021)	Cha Cha Real Smooth (2022)	Do Revenge (2022)

Chris Stracey chronology
Maid (2021)	Cha Cha Real Smooth (2022)	War Pony (2022)

Cha Cha Real Smooth (Soundtrack from the Apple Original Film) is the soundtrack extended play that consisted of original score composed by Este Haim and Chris Stracey for the 2022 film of the same name directed by Cooper Raiff. The album was released on June 17, 2022 by Columbia Records (the same day as it limited theatrical and Apple TV+ release) featured nearly five tracks from their score. The initial film that had much of the score when premiered at the Sundance Film Festival being strip down from the film as Raiff wanted to do with the minimalistic approach on music, to match the diegetic music featured in the film. Being their maiden feature-length score for the duo, the music received positive critical response.

== Development ==
The film marked both Haim and Stracey's feature-length scoring debut. Ro Donnelly, one of the producers had friendship with Stracey's wife, had discussed about the film in his house, when the duo were working on the score for Maid. Donnelly had sent the script for the film, and Stracey who watched and liked Raiff's previous venture Shithouse (2020) immediately agreed to score for the film. Both Haim and Stracey had inspired the musical works from Alex G as Shithouse incorporated the musician's works in the film, and Raiff also demanded incorporated Alex G's music. Since Haim, was also a fan of Alex G, she felt like "we're 100 percent on the same page, you’re speaking my language". Raiff sent them playlist of songs that drives the inspiration to the film and also noted on sonic sounds and instrumentation that he wanted to include or avoid in the film.

The score is an amalgamation of organic and inorganic instruments. Haim used to listen to the song "In a Big Country" by Big Country, where they used the guitars sounding like bagpipes and they felt it as "a cool idea" on playing those instrument not knowing what they are hearing. Hence, in that approach, the duo made the organic instruments sound as inorganic in certain aspects. They also wanted to "hone on the emotional depth of Cooper's character, as well as to retain the fun in the film. She added that the ice pop scene was the hardest thing to score, as "We didn’t want to make it too lovey-dovey [because] at the same time, it’s a heartbreaking scene. You learn so much about Domino in that scene. Striking a fine balance with that one that was super important."

Raiff had to consistently work with the score for the past few months, when the film was set to be screened at the Sundance Film Festival and SXSW, where there had a variation of the score, as much of the cues had to be removed. He said that even though, the film had a lot of music, he felt nice to have "everything quiet in the film", which resulted in stripping down much of the cues. He, however praised the compositions by Haim and Stracey, as both did "an amazing job". For the diegetic music, he worked with music supervisor Rob Lowry on selecting songs that are "smart and cheap". He wanted the Lupe Fiasco track "The Show Goes On" in the first place, as "it’s at the beginning of the movie and it sort of cheats for the rest of the movie, tricking the viewer into thinking, “Oh, this is a movie that has this level of songs,” even though we didn’t really have a song that was anywhere near that". In a sequence, where "WAP" by Cardi B and Megan Thee Stallion is playing, Raiff used the karaoke version of the track as his character was screaming into the microphone, covering up that the song is not the original version. He had to be much smart about the choices of diegetic music being featured in the film.

== Track listing ==
No.	Title	Length
1.	"Ice Pops"	3:23
2.	"The Circus"	3:44
3.	"Memories Aren't Going Anywhere"	3:01
4.	"Domino's Doorstep"	2:58
5.	"End Credits"	3:18
Total length:		16:24

== Reception ==
Ari Snyder of The Daily of the University of Washington wrote "From an auditory perspective, there are some dramatic scenes that had their impact undercut by the presence of music. That said, hats off to Este Haim and Christopher Stracey for creating a wonderful score." Morgan Rojas of Cinemacy called the score as "pitch-perfect", while Stephen Saito of Movable Fest called it as "seductive synthy". Haim and Stracey's score for the film has been listed as a possible contender in Variety's predictions for Academy Award for Best Original Score at the 95th Academy Awards.

== Additional music ==
A separate playlist containing the diegetic songs featured in the film was released by Apple Music.

- "The Show Goes On" – Lupe Fiasco
- "Hit The Road Jack" – Ray Charles
- "Clear Bones" – Jean Dawson
- "Got Me Looking At You" – PSM
- "fooly cooly" – boyband
- "Funkytown" – Lipps Inc.
- "Into Blue" – Dayglow
- "No Drama" – Omari Massenburg
- "Put It Down" – Jazmine Sullivan
- "Dance With Me Today" – Yb.
- "WAP" – Cardi B, Megan Thee Stallion
- "Never Gonna Stop" – Two Hidden Labs feat. DEVMO
- "Crime" – Alex G
- "From the Back of a Cab" – Rostam
- "Dance Cookie" – Louis Edwards, Henry Parsley
- "Loner" – Dehd
- "Demonstrate" – Clav, David Austin, Katie Thompson
- "Infinity Flow" – Iain Harper feat. Baby Bleu
- "Forest Green" – Red Machine
- "Cha Cha Slide (Original Live Platinum Band Mix)" – DJ Casper
- "Smartest Man" – Homeschool, Samia
- "Downtown" – Majical Cloudz
- "Tools" – Hovvdy
