= Not Waving but Drowning (disambiguation) =

Not Waving but Drowning is the title of a 1957 poem by British poet Stevie Smith.

It may also refer to:

- Not Waving, but Drowning, a 2019 album by British rapper Loyle Carner.
  - This album contains a track by the same name featuring an elderly woman, who speaks about the 1957 poem by Stevie Smith.
- Not Waving but Drowning (film), 2012 drama film
- "Not Waving but Drowning", a track on The Victorian English Gentlemens Club's 2011 album Bag of Meat.
