= Brianna Hildebrand =

American actress (born 1996)

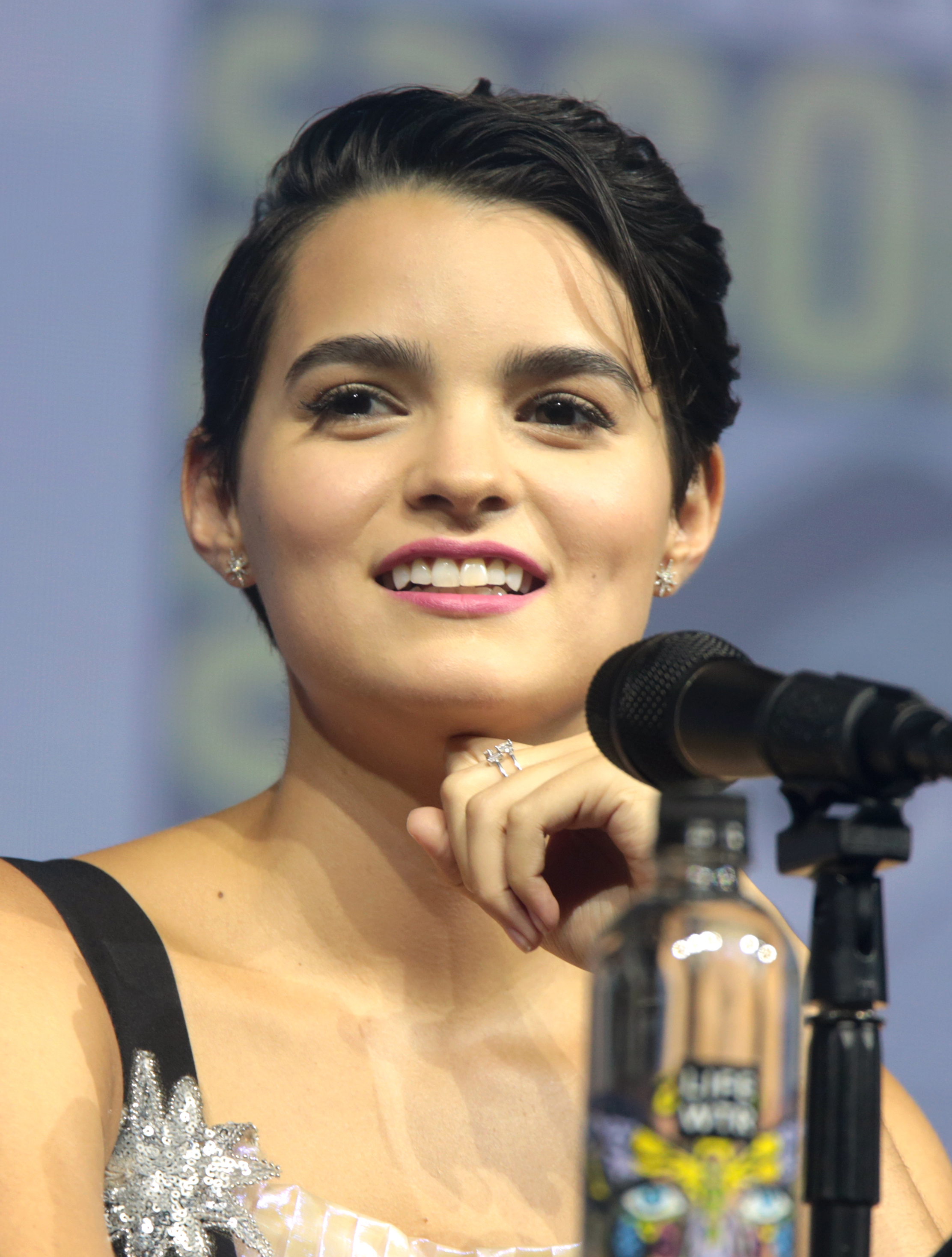
- Hildebrand in 2018
- Born: August 14, 1996 (age 30)
- Occupation: Actress
- Years active: 2014–present

Brianna Hildebrand (born August 14, 1996) is an American actress. She is best known for appearing as Negasonic Teenage Warhead in the films Deadpool (2016), Deadpool 2 (2018), and Deadpool & Wolverine (2024). She is also known for appearing in the web series Annie Undocumented, and as the character Aurora in the Netflix show Lucifer. She also portrayed Elodie Davis in the show Trinkets.

== Career ==
Hildebrand appeared in the web series Annie Undocumented, named best web series at the 2014 New York TV Festival. The series was created by Daniel Hsia, Elaine Low and Brian Yang.

Hildebrand was cast as the superhero Negasonic Teenage Warhead in the film Deadpool on March 30, 2015. The film was shot in Vancouver in April 2015, and released on February 12, 2016. She reprised the role in the sequel in 2018. She was also cast as Sasha in First Girl I Loved, starring opposite Dylan Gelula and Mateo Arias.

In July 2017, Hildebrand was added to the main cast for season two of The Exorcist. In December 2020, Hildebrand was added to the cast of Lucifer for its final season.

== Personal life ==
Hildebrand is openly queer. She is a vocal advocate for LGBTQ+ rights and has spoken about her experiences as a queer woman.

== Filmography ==
=== Film ===
Year	Title	Role	Notes
2015	Prism	Julia	
2015	The Voice Inside	Grace	Short film; also producer
2016	First Girl I Loved	Sasha	
2016	Deadpool	Negasonic Teenage Warhead	
2017	Tragedy Girls	Sadie Cunningham	
2018	Deadpool 2	Negasonic Teenage Warhead	
2019	Playing with Fire	Brynn	
2020	Runt	Gabriella	
2022	The Time Capsule	Elise	
2024	Deadpool & Wolverine	Negasonic Teenage Warhead	
2025	Fog of War	Penny Duncolm	
2025	Osiris	Ravi	
2026	Holiguards Saga — The Portal of Force	Whiplash	
TBA	Bethesda	Jolene	Post-production

=== Television ===
Year	Title	Role	Notes
2017	The Exorcist	Verity	Main cast (season 2)
2019	Love Daily	Lizzie	Episode: "Group"
2019–2020	Trinkets	Elodie Davis	Main cast
2021	Lucifer	Aurora "Rory" Decker-Morningstar	Main cast (season 6)

=== Web series ===
Year	Title	Role	Notes
2014	Annie Undocumented	Jen	

== Awards and nominations ==
Year	Awards	Category	Recipient	Outcome
2016	Teen Choice Awards	Choice Movie: Breakout Star	Deadpool	Nominated
2017	London FrightFest Film Festival	Best Actress	Tragedy Girls	Won
2017	Brooklyn Horror Film Festival	Best Actress	Tragedy Girls	Won
