= Hal & Harper =

2025 American comedy-drama television miniseries

- Genre: Comedy-drama
- Created by: Cooper Raiff
- Written by: Cooper Raiff
- Directed by: Cooper Raiff
- Starring: Cooper Raiff; Lili Reinhart; Betty Gilpin; Mark Ruffalo
- Country of origin: United States
- Original language: English
- No. of episodes: 9

Production
- Executive producers: Lili Reinhart; Cooper Raiff; Daniel Lewis; Addison Timlin; Clementine Quittner
- Producer: Thomas Hartmann
- Cinematography: Doug Emmett
- Editor: McKinley Carlin
- Running time: 25–43 minutes
- Production companies: Bad Bangs LLC; Small Ideas; Lionsgate Television

Original release
- Network: Stan
- Release: June 26, 2025
- Network: Mubi
- Release: October 19 – November 30, 2025

Hal & Harper is an American comedy-drama television miniseries created, written, and directed by Cooper Raiff and starring Raiff, Lili Reinhart, Betty Gilpin, and Mark Ruffalo.

The series had its world premiere at the Sundance Film Festival on January 26, 2025. All episodes were released in Australia on Stan on June 26. The series then began streaming on Mubi in the United States, Latin America, and France on October 19.

== Premise ==
Speaking in 2020, Raiff described the plot as following two siblings and their single father who is making them grow up too fast. With that in mind, the 7-year old and 9-year-old characters would be cast with adult actors.

== Cast and characters ==
- Cooper Raiff as Hal
- Lili Reinhart as Harper
- Mark Ruffalo as Hal and Harper's father
- Betty Gilpin as Kate, Dad's girlfriend
- Addison Timlin as Audrey, Harper's co-worker
- Havana Rose Liu as Abby Jossos, Hal's on-and-off girlfriend
- Alyah Chanelle Scott as Jesse, Harper's longtime girlfriend
- T. J. Power as Adam

== Episodes ==
No.	Title	Directed by	Written by	Original release date	U.S. release date
1	"Pilot"	Cooper Raiff	Cooper Raiff	June 26, 2025	October 19, 2025
2	"Going to Each Other"	Cooper Raiff	Cooper Raiff	June 26, 2025	October 19, 2025
3	"Our House"	Cooper Raiff	Cooper Raiff	June 26, 2025	October 26, 2025
4	"Adventure Landing"	Cooper Raiff	Cooper Raiff	June 26, 2025	November 2, 2025
5	"Halloween"	Cooper Raiff	Cooper Raiff	June 26, 2025	November 9, 2025
6	"Didn't Even Hurt"	Cooper Raiff	Cooper Raiff	June 26, 2025	November 16, 2025
7	"Vegas"	Cooper Raiff	Cooper Raiff	June 26, 2025	November 23, 2025
8	"Are You Watching? Part 1"	Cooper Raiff	Cooper Raiff	June 26, 2025	November 30, 2025
9	"Are You Watching? Part 2"	Cooper Raiff	Cooper Raiff	June 26, 2025	November 30, 2025

== Production ==
Speaking in 2020 to Screen Daily, Cooper Raiff said he had been writing the script for Hal & Harper for "a long time". The series was initially set up at FX, however, Raiff opted to produce the series independently after creative differences, with Lionsgate Television providing financing. In August 2023, Mark Ruffalo and Lili Reinhart were cast, with Ruffalo expected to play the father and Reinhart and Raiff expected to play the siblings. Also joining the cast were Addison Timlin and Havana Rose Liu.

Filming started in Los Angeles in August 2023. An interim agreement was obtained to continue production during the 2023 SAG-AFTRA strike. In January 2024, lead actress Lili Reinhart shared photographs from filming on her private Instagram account.

== Reception ==
On the review aggregator website Rotten Tomatoes, 92% of 24 critics' reviews are positive. The website's critics consensus reads, "Naturalistic and peppered with relatable insight, Hal & Harper is a moving family dramedy enlivened by superb performances across the board." Metacritic, which uses a weighted average, assigned the show a score of 81 out of 100, based on 11 critics, indicating "universal acclaim".
