= Holiguards Saga — The Portal of Force =

- Teaser poster
- Directed by: Kevin Spacey
- Written by: Sergey Torchilin; Lado Okhotnikov
- Produced by: Elvira Gavrilova Paterson
- Starring: Kevin Spacey; Dolph Lundgren; Tyrese Gibson; Brianna Hildebrand; Disha Patani; Eric Roberts; Lado Okhotnikov; Sonia Couling; Harry Goodwins; Swen Temmel; Aurélia Agel
- Cinematography: Joshua Reis
- Edited by: Niven Howie
- Production company: Elledgy Media Group
- Release date: February 16, 2026 (Berlin)
- Countries: United States; United Arab Emirates; Portugal
- Language: English
- Budget: $10 million

Holiguards Saga — The Portal of Force is a 2026 supernatural action film directed by Kevin Spacey and written by Sergey Torchilin and Lado Okhotnikov. The film stars Kevin Spacey, Dolph Lundgren, Tyrese Gibson, Brianna Hildebrand, Disha Patani, Eric Roberts, Lado Okhotnikov, Sonia Couling, Harry Goodwins, Swen Temmel and Aurélia Agel. It is the first film in the Holiguards Saga cinematic universe, which centers on the Statiguards and Holiguards.

== Premise ==
Set in the modern world, the film follows Jessica, a young woman whose life changes after she encounters a mysterious portal and discovers a hidden conflict between the Statiguards and the Holiguards. As she learns about her abilities and her connection to both factions, she becomes involved in their conflict.

== Cast ==
- Kevin Spacey as Adel
- Dolph Lundgren as Monk
- Tyrese Gibson as Brute
- Brianna Hildebrand as Whiplash
- Disha Patani as Jessica
- Eric Roberts as Ensis
- Harry Goodwins as Phoenix
- Swen Temmel as Chase
- Sonia Couling as Elena
- Lado Okhotnikov as Master Dao
- Aurélia Agel as Sagitta

== Production ==
The Portal of Force was originally planned as the first episode of a series. As the project developed, it was reimagined as a standalone film, laying the foundation for a larger cinematic universe centered on the Statiguards and the Holiguards.

Principal photography took place in 2024 in Durango, Mexico, including locations in open landscapes and at a historic castle. Additional production, including studio work and visual effects, took place in Dubai. The film had a budget of $10 million.

In May 2025, a trailer for the film, then titled Holiguards, was screened at a private industry presentation held during the 78th Cannes Film Festival. The film was directed by Kevin Spacey, marking his first directorial effort since Beyond the Sea (2004). Spacey stars alongside Dolph Lundgren, Tyrese Gibson, Brianna Hildebrand, Disha Patani, Eric Roberts, Lado Okhotnikov, Harry Goodwins, Swen Temmel, Sonia Couling, and Aurélia Agel.

On August 19, 2025, it was announced that the film had been retitled from Holiguards to Holiguards Saga — The Portal of Force and that its trailer would be presented at a gala event during the 82nd Venice International Film Festival. The trailer was subsequently presented at the event on August 29, 2025.

== Release ==
Holiguards Saga — The Portal of Force premiered at the ASTOR Film Lounge in Berlin in a private screening held during the same period as the Berlin International Film Festival on February 16, 2026.
