= Tragedy Girls =

- Theatrical release poster
- Directed by: Tyler MacIntyre
- Screenplay by: Chris Lee Hill; Tyler MacIntyre
- Story by: Tyler MacIntyre
- Produced by: Anthony Holt; Armen Aghaeian; Edward Mokhtarian; Cameron Van Hoy; Tara Ansley; Craig Robinson
- Starring: Alexandra Shipp; Brianna Hildebrand; Josh Hutcherson; Craig Robinson; Kevin Durand; Jack Quaid
- Cinematography: Pawel Pogorzelski
- Edited by: Martin Pensa
- Music by: Russ Howard III
- Production companies: It's The Comeback Kids; New Artist Pictures
- Distributed by: Gunpowder & Sky
- Release dates: March 12, 2017 (SXSW); October 20, 2017 (United States)
- Running time: 98 minutes
- Country: United States
- Language: English

Tragedy Girls is a 2017 American teen buddy comedy horror film directed by Tyler MacIntyre, written by Chris Lee Hill and MacIntyre, and starring Alexandra Shipp, Brianna Hildebrand, Josh Hutcherson, Craig Robinson, Kevin Durand and Jack Quaid. It was released on October 20, 2017, by Gunpowder & Sky.

== Plot ==
Misunderstood high school seniors McKayla Hooper and Sadie Cunningham live in the Midwestern town of Rosedale and run a true crime blog called Tragedy Girls. They are obsessed with murder and fame, and are willing to do anything to get more followers. They use their friend Craig as bait to capture serial killer Lowell Orson Lehmann and ask him to aid them, but he refuses. The two decide to keep him captive, commit murders themselves and use Lehmann as a fall guy. The next day, Craig is missing, presumed to have run away. McKayla, Sadie, and their friend Jordan attempt to convince Rosedale that there is a serial killer running loose, but they only earn the ire of Jordan's father, Sheriff Welch. When McKayla's ex-boyfriend Toby amasses more followers on Twitter than the girls, McKayla and Sadie kill him. His death is ruled an accident, enraging the two girls.

They next kill cheerleading captain Syl and cut her body into pieces in order to ensure that her death is ruled a homicide. At Syl's memorial service, a local firefighter, Big Al, vows to catch the killer. Meanwhile, Lehmann attempts to turn McKayla against Sadie by convincing her that Sadie will use her to do the dirty work and take all of the credit. The girls plot to kill Big Al while he works out at the gym. Big Al fights back, but the two narrowly manage to stab him and decapitate him with a bench press. Afterwards, Jordan arrives and reveals he has stolen the serial killer case files from his father.

Mayor Campbell calls an emergency town meeting, and McKayla and Sadie rile the townspeople into turning against local law enforcement by showing them to be incompetent, including sending the people of the town a picture of Big Al's severed head. They hold a march in defiance of the killer. However, Lehmann escapes and murders Mayor Campbell. Jordan has a falling out with McKayla and Sadie and leaves them, in support of his father. An enraged McKayla discovers Jordan has stolen a phone belonging to her that has videos of the murders, and goads Sadie into heading to Jordan's house to kill him. Jordan reveals that he broke into the school and stole McKayla's psychological profile; he suspects her of being the killer. They are interrupted when Lehmann breaks into the Welch residence and brutally stabs Jordan. McKayla awakens the sleeping Sheriff Welch by breaking his window; he drives Lehmann off and saves Jordan. Sadie takes the opportunity to destroy McKayla's stolen phone.

Two weeks later, Sadie is publicly honored by Welch; she does not acknowledge McKayla in her speech. The two have a falling out. Prom arrives; Sadie goes with Jordan as her date, while McKayla teams up with Lehmann. After killing their teacher, McKayla confronts Sadie. Unaware that Jordan is listening, she recounts how they murdered Jordan's mother as children. Jordan attempts to flee with Sadie to safety, but they are cornered by Lehmann and McKayla. Lehmann attempts to attack Sadie, but is stopped by McKayla. He turns on her, and McKayla pulls out a gun and shoots Lehmann dead. The girls reconcile, hang Jordan, and – after chain-locking the doors shut – start a fire in the gymnasium that traps and kills 124 prom-goers. In the aftermath, Lehmann is shown to have been blamed for the murders. A grieving Welch resigns as sheriff to focus on charity work, while McKayla and Sadie head off to college to start a new chapter in their lives, as though nothing had happened.

== Cast ==
- Alexandra Shipp as McKayla Hooper
- Brianna Hildebrand as Sadie Cunningham
- Josh Hutcherson as Toby Mitchell
- Craig Robinson as Albert "Big Al" Hill
- Kevin Durand as Lowell Orson Lehmann
- Jack Quaid as Jordan Welch
- Timothy V. Murphy as Sheriff Blane Welch
- Nicky Whelan as Mrs. Kent
- Kerry Rhodes as Drew
- Austin Abrams as Craig Thompson
- Andy Bethea as Mr. Hooper
- Rosalind Chao as Mayor Campbell
- Keith Hudson as Chuck Cunningham
- Savannah Jayde as Syl
- Loren Lester as Principal Reid
- Marycarmen Lopez as Trish
- Sophia Mitchell as Tracy
- Elise Neal as Mrs. Hooper
- Tory Stolper as Alice Wade
- William Tokarsky as Mr. Gordon

== Release ==
Tragedy Girls premiered at South by Southwest on March 12, 2017. On July 31, 2017, Gunpowder & Sky acquired distribution rights to the film. The studio released it on October 20, 2017.

== Reception ==
The film has received positive reviews. On review aggregator Rotten Tomatoes, the film has an approval rating of 85% based on 72 reviews, with an average rating of 7/10. The website's critical consensus states, "Tragedy Girls injects familiar teen tropes with just enough up-to-the-minute commentary — and pitch-black humor — to work as an irreverently entertaining diversion."
