= In a Relationship =

2018 film by Sam Boyd

- Theatrical release poster
- Directed by: Sam Boyd
- Written by: Sam Boyd
- Produced by: Sam Boyd; Jorge Garcia Castro; David Hunter; Ross Putman
- Starring: Emma Roberts; Michael Angarano; Dree Hemingway; Patrick Gibson; Jay Ellis; Melora Walters
- Cinematography: Martim Vian
- Edited by: Max Goldblatt
- Music by: Michael Boyd
- Production companies: 2 Friends Media; PSH Collective; Skyline Entertainment
- Distributed by: Vertical Entertainment
- Release dates: April 20, 2018 (Tribeca); November 9, 2018 (United States)
- Running time: 92 minutes
- Country: United States
- Language: English

In a Relationship is a 2018 American romantic drama film, written and directed by Sam Boyd. It stars Emma Roberts, Michael Angarano, Dree Hemingway, Patrick Gibson, Jay Ellis, and Melora Walters, and focuses the relationship of two couples over one summer.

It had its world premiere at the Tribeca Film Festival on April 20, 2018. It released on November 9, 2018, by Vertical Entertainment.

== Plot ==
Three years after they started dating, Hallie and Owen reunite with their respective friends Willa and Matt at a house party in Malibu. That night, Hallie and Owen have a minor argument during the July the 4th fireworks but reconcile upon going home. Unbeknownst to Matt, Willa has a secret relationship with a man named Jakob via text. Willa goes back to Matt's house after the party and they have sex. The relationship between Hallie and Owen begins to deteriorate after she suggests moving in together and he hesitates and she leaves his house.

Hallie meets Dexter, who has recently been dumped by his girlfriend, at a photo-shoot. He invites her to get a drink. Owen unexpectedly shows up at the bar and mocks Dexter's TV show. Hallie then invites Dexter to her house and they reluctantly have sex. Owen calls Matt, ranting about Hallie's new relationship with Dexter. At her photo exhibit, Hallie meets photo-assistant Lindsay and, in the swimming pool, they share a kiss in front of Willa and Matt, who leave the pool in shock upon seeing the two girls together. They decide not to tell Owen about Hallie's same-sex relationship.

Matt reads Jakob's text messages on Willa's phone. Heartbroken, Matt confronts her, but reluctantly stays at Willa's side. The next morning, Owen unexpectedly meets up with Hallie at his house and they have sex. Hallie later realizes that it was a mistake and finally reveals her relationship with Lindsay via text message.

Hallie visits Owen at his house and they argue about Owen's not taking their relationship seriously. Willa sleeps with Matt for the last time, before finally leaving to meet Jakob. Sometime later, hoping to get Hallie back, Owen cleans his house and fixes the closet. Hallie arrives at his house and Owen pleads with Hallie to move in with him. She refuses, finally telling him that she will never go back with him. The film then jumps back three years and ends showing the birth of the relationship between two couples.

== Cast ==
- Emma Roberts as Hallie
- Michael Angarano as Owen
- Dree Hemingway as Willa
- Patrick Gibson as Matt
- Jay Ellis as Dexter
- Melora Walters as Mia Ziniti
- Gayle Rankin as Rachel Flegelman
- Greta Lee as Maggie
- Janet Montgomery as Lindsay
- Andre Hyland as Persky
- Luka Jones as Ash
- Sasha Spielberg as Clara

== Production ==
In March 2017, it was announced Emma Roberts, Michael Angarano, Dree Hemingway, Jay Ellis, Melora Walters, Gayle Rankin, Greta Lee, Janet Montgomery, Andre Hyland, Luka Jones and Sasha Spielberg had joined the cast of the, film with Sam Boyd directing and writing from a screenplay he wrote. Boyd will also produce the film, alongside Jorge Garcia Castro, David Hunter and Ross Putman, Sergio Cortez Gomez, Andres Icaza Ballesteros, Roberts, Kariah Press who will serve as producers and executive producers respectively, under their 2 Friends Media banner. Production concluded that month.

== Release ==
The film had its world premiere at the Tribeca Film Festival on April 20, 2018. Shortly after, Vertical Entertainment acquired distribution rights to the film. It was scheduled to be released on November 9, 2018.

== Reception ==
On the review aggregator website Rotten Tomatoes, 64% of 14 critics' reviews are positive. Metacritic, which uses a weighted average, assigned the film a score of 51 out of 100, based on 10 critics, indicating "mixed or average" reviews.
