= First Girl I Loved =

2016 film by Kerem Sanga

- Directed by: Kerem Sanga
- Written by: Kerem Sanga
- Produced by: Seth Caplan; David Hunter; Ross Putman
- Starring: Dylan Gelula; Mateo Arias; Brianna Hildebrand; Pamela Adlon
- Cinematography: Ricardo Diaz
- Edited by: Shane Hazen
- Music by: John Swihart
- Production companies: PSH Collective; Tilted Windmill Productions; Bee-Hive Productions
- Release dates: January 24, 2016 (Sundance); October 18, 2016 (United States)
- Running time: 90 minutes
- Country: United States
- Language: English

First Girl I Loved is a 2016 American romantic drama film written and directed by Kerem Sanga. It stars Dylan Gelula, Brianna Hildebrand, Mateo Arias, Tim Heidecker and Pamela Adlon. The film premiered at the 2016 Sundance Film Festival and won the Audience Award for "Best of NEXT". The film follows two teenage girls, nerdy yearbook editor Anne and softball star Sasha, wrestling with their sexuality at a Los Angeles high school. It was released in the United States and Canada in select theaters and on demand October 18, 2016.

== Plot ==
While watching a high school softball game, yearbook editor Anne falls for the team star Sasha. She confesses her realization to her best friend Clifton, who reacts badly due to his own feelings for Anne. He kisses Anne, and, after she pushes him away, Clifton rapes her, while she remains frozen in shock. She eventually pushes him away and tearfully expresses that her current crush is not a boy, as Clifton had assumed, but a girl. Clifton insults her as a dyke and accuses her of leading him on.

Under the guise of yearbook interviews, Anne visits Sasha and the two begin to strike up a friendship. Their relationship grows over the upcoming weeks through their texting, culminating in Anne comforting Sasha after the latter causes her team to lose their big game.

Clifton continues to lash out at Anne in jealousy. When Anne discovers he broke her bike lock and caused it to be stolen, she attacks him during their yearbook class, causing her to receive disciplinary action from the school. Clifton remains engaged in his plan to sabotage Anne, ultimately asking out Sasha himself. However, he begins to regret his actions during a meeting with his guidance counselor.

After being reprimanded by the school and arguing with her mother, Anne goes on a hangout with Sasha and convinces her to let her sleep over at Sasha's house. That same night, the two sneak out to a bar and flirt with some men, but end up dancing with each other and kissing. Sasha is confused following their encounter, but lets Anne return home and the two share her bed.

The following day, Sasha refuses to speak to Anne and attempts dating Clifton, but he has accepted Anne dating her and mistakes Sasha's offer to be for him to be a beard. Anne tries unsuccessfully to resume her relationship with Sasha, even admitting her crush in public, but Sasha remains distant.

Growing hurt, Anne secretly includes a picture in the school yearbook of her and Sasha kissing. The swapped photo is printed in every yearbook, and the families of Clifton, Anne, and Sasha are called by the school to convene. There, Sasha asserts that the encounter in the photograph was non-consensual and depicted Anne taking advantage of her while she was drunk. Clifton, grappling with his own breach of Anne's consent, takes the blame for placing the photo in the yearbook and expresses how much of the student body knew the two were dating. Sasha ultimately concedes that she "doesn't know" if she hadn't or had consented. Anne and her mother then leave the meeting.

Later that day, Anne visits Jasmine, the owner of the bar and retail store where she and Sasha hung out, now to test herself for HIV. The two share a period of reflection over her history, in which Anne comments on another coercive sexual experience. Anne discuss her heartache over Sasha and accepts that she is gay. As she leaves, she sees her stolen bike in the shop window and reenters the store.

== Cast ==
- Dylan Gelula as Anne Smith
- Brianna Hildebrand as Sasha Basanez
- Pamela Adlon as Sharon Sacopolus
- Mateo Arias as Clifton Martinez
- Tim Heidecker as Mr. Quibodeaux
- Cameron Esposito as Jasmine
- Jennifer Prediger as Assistant Principal Heather Wiggins
- Erik Griffin as Mr. Maldonado
- Ana Dela Cruz as Rita Basanez
- John Redlinger as Johnny Glasses

== Critical reception ==
The film has received positive reviews and has a 90% "Fresh" rating on Rotten Tomatoes, based on 31 reviews. The website's critics consensus reads, "Intelligent, empathetic, and well-acted, First Girl I Loved explores teen romance from a refreshing - and emotionally resonant - perspective."

Toronto Star critic Peter Howell praised the "smouldering drama," saying "Sexual disorientation in high school makes for movie brilliance in this "Best of NEXT" audience award winner from Sundance 2016." Consequence of Sound critic Justin Gerber wrote: "What writer and director Kerem Sanga captures so well in First Girl I Loved is high school. What he captures even better is falling in love, or the naïve idea of what it means to be in love as a teenager." Bilge Ebiri of Vulture admired the way language, both spoken and unspoken, is used in the film, saying: "All around these kids swirls a matrix of communication: voice-over, multiple languages, text messages, innuendo, made-up diction, fake accents, even softball signals. Writer-director Kerem Sanga finds stylistic ways to express this diversity of speech." Variety critic Dennis Harvey favored the acting performances, but stated: "The results are more well intentioned than actually purposeful, but nonetheless slick and pacey enough to hold attention." SLUG's Alexander Ortega praised the film's "nontraditional narrative structure" and commented: "The sensations that First Girl I Love generates through the fugue storytelling device, however, communicates their urgency and gravity." Collider critic Tommy Cook described the film as "a collage of time-half-remembered," saying that "for a film that tackles such weighty subjects as consent & homophobia, First Girl I Loved never gets bogged down in melodrama. It's a kind film – heartfelt and empathetic – a memory more than earned."

== Awards ==
2016 Audience Award: Next at the 2016 Sundance Film Festival
