= Forever's End =

- Film poster
- Directed by: J. C. Schroder
- Written by: J. C. Schroder
- Produced by: J. C. Schroder; Michael Katchman
- Starring: Charity Farrell; Lili Reinhart
- Music by: Douglas Romayne; Douglas Edward
- Production company: Star Com Productions
- Distributed by: Devolver Digital
- Release dates: July 3, 2013 (Dances With Films); October 14, 2014 (VOD)
- Running time: 92 minutes

Forever's End is a 2013 American apocalyptic psychological thriller. The film is written and directed by J. C. Schroder and stars Charity Farrell and Lili Reinhart.

== Plot ==
Six years after an apocalyptic event, Sarah lives alone in a farmhouse, her time spent cleaning, piano playing and writing in a diary. One day, (after many years of being alone) her sister, Lili, bleeding from her abdomen, approaches the house. Sarah takes her sister into the bathroom and attempts to undress her, but is rebuffed. At night, upon hearing a noise, Sarah investigates while carrying a gun. Startled by a man outside the house, she shoots, killing him. In the morning she drags the body into a shed. Soon another man appears. Ryan shows Sarah a sketch he had made of her, years ago as she and her father were in a city, and has searched to find her.

Ryan attempts to convince Sarah that the "end of the world" never happened, that there are people and cities in the world. Lili argues with Sarah, insisting that she get the man to leave the house. As Lili attempts to have her sister force Ryan away, Sarah becomes attracted to him and eventually begin a romantic event in the grasses outside the house. Interrupted by Lili's screams, the two break down her door to find her threatening each with a knife. Separating for the night, Sarah wakes alone in the morning. Finding her dress stained she changes into a prom dress that she had been making. After seeing a sign and Lili's door reading "don't trip," which Sarah ignores, she trips on a lucky charm necklace, falling down the stairs and sustains an abdominal wound after landing on a chandelier. The two sisters argue, culminating in Sarah stabbing Lili.

Ryan finds Sarah bleeding on the floor. He attempts to convince her that Lili never existed by showing her the pictures in the room. He bandages her wounds and attempts to undress her in the bathroom, but she denies his assistance much like how her sister refused help a few days ago. She agrees to go with Ryan to the city, departing for the day–long hike in the morning. Along the walk she confronts Ryan, who pushes a finger into her abdominal wound, he tells her it hasn't been six years since anything and that was all in her head. Lying on the ground she recalls walking along a city street with her dad as he presents her with the very same lucky charm necklace. She begins running toward the Fourth of July fireworks, turning to find him gone. She walks back, stopping at an alley where he is being attacked by a masked man. He shoots Sarah's father then stabs her twice and while speaking to her Sarah realizes that the man is Ryan. While on the ground Sarah shoots a gun at him, then turns to see her dying father. Back in the fields Sarah shoots at Ryan, but cannot find his body. She gathers her belongings, continuing to walk the path until she approaches the city.

== Cast ==
- Charity Farrell as Sarah White
- Lili Reinhart as Lily White
- Warren Bryson as Ryan
- David Wetzel as Jim White

== Production ==
Of the film, Schroder stated that his goal was to "retain a level of cinematic “realism” that is so vivid that above and beyond just entertaining the audience, we create real characters, real people facing very real horrors, and thus, very frightening realities." Filming took place during 2011 and filming locations included Eaton (farmhouse scenes), Cincinnati (city scenes), and West Chester, in Ohio, and in Newport and Corinth, Kentucky (field scenes). Closing credits are featured over Mimi Page's "Jigsaw", performed by the film's actresses Charity Farrell and Lili Reinhart.

== Release ==
The film was released to cable video on demand on October 14, 2014, and to digital VOD and DVD on November 25, 2014. Prior to this the film screened at multiple film festivals such as Dances With Films.

== Reception ==
Bears Fonté of AMFM Magazine writes that the film "feels deceptively simple, but any film in which trust and insanity plays such a big role is bound to be packed with revelations and twists. Add to that, it is just breathtaking to look at, and the sound and score really feel like a much higher-budgeted film."

Film Threat criticized the film's pacing while overall praising the film, noting that "I’m very much interested in what the story is and where it’s going, when perhaps the film is more interested in who Sarah is and how to grow her character. Even there, I think you could do the same thing in less time BUT I’m willing to concede that, if that was the goal, it succeeds there regardless."

== Accolades ==
The Fancine 2013 Best Actress award was given to Charity Farrell. The film's music received a Silver Jury Prize at the 2014 Park City Film Music Festival.
