= Force of Nature (2020 film) =

Film by Michael Polish

- Release poster
- Directed by: Michael Polish
- Written by: Cory Miller
- Produced by: Randall Emmett; George Furla; Shaun Sanghani; Mark Stewart; Luillo Ruiz
- Starring: Emile Hirsch; Kate Bosworth; Mel Gibson; David Zayas; Stephanie Cayo; Will Catlett; Swen Temmel; Tyler Jon Olson; Jorge Luis Ramos
- Cinematography: Jayson Crothers
- Edited by: Paul Buhl; Raúl Marchand Sánchez
- Music by: Kubilay Uner
- Production companies: Grindstone Entertainment Group; Emmett Furla Oasis Films; The Pimienta Film Co.; SSS Entertainment
- Distributed by: Lionsgate
- Release date: June 30, 2020 (United States)
- Running time: 91 minutes
- Country: United States
- Language: English
- Budget: $23 million
- Box office: $638,221

Force of Nature is a 2020 American action thriller film directed by Michael Polish from a screenplay by Cory Miller. The film stars Emile Hirsch, Kate Bosworth, Mel Gibson, David Zayas, Stephanie Cayo, Will Catlett, Swen Temmel, Tyler Jon Olsen, and Jorge Luis Ramos. The plot follows police and criminals trapped in an apartment building during a hurricane.

Force of Nature was released on digital, DVD, and Blu-ray disc by Lionsgate on June 30, 2020, receiving negative reviews from critics.

== Plot ==
A hurricane is approaching Puerto Rico and an evacuation order is in effect. John the Baptist, a thief, steals a painting. Cardillo and Jess Peña, police officers, go out to evacuate anyone who is still in their home.

Griffin buys all of the meat available at a market and gets into a fight with another customer who wants some of the meat. Cardillo and Peña respond. Before they take him to the evacuation shelter he insists he needs to feed his pet cat, and that an old man and a retired police officer are in his apartment complex refusing to evacuate.

Because the retired police officer needs evacuation, they agree to go to the apartment. Ray (Mel Gibson), the officer, refuses to leave, even though his daughter Troy, a doctor, has a bed available for him at the hospital as she is worried that his dialysis machine won't work if the power goes out. Cardillo takes Troy to the apartment of Paul Bergkamp (the old man) who also refuses to leave. Peña stays with Ray. While trying to convince Bergkamp to evacuate, Cardillo witnesses the building superintendent get fatally shot by John. He, Troy, and Bergkamp go to Griffin's apartment. The thieves work on breaking into Bergkamp's hefty security while some of them go to clear the building, chasing the group up the stairs but losing them.

When Cardillo, Troy, and Bergkamp arrive at Griffin's apartment, Griffin refuses to let them in as he is about to feed his pet which is locked in a separate room. Cardillo eventually convinces Griffin to let them in. The police radios are down from the storm. Griffin's pet tiger breaks out of the room and drags Griffin in. Griffin has Cardillo bring in the bucket of meat. Cardillo drags Griffin out and locks the tiger back into the room as Troy attends to his injured leg. Troy requests medical supplies. They go to a doctor's apartment who Bergkamp says is in the building. However, the stairwell is monitored by the thieves and the elevator doesn't work, so they climb the scaffolding.

Peña, unaware of the thieves' presence, walks into the hallway. One of the thieves finds her, demanding she lead him to Cardillo and Bergkamp. Ray shoots and kills the thief. The thieves break into Bergkamp's apartment and find a safe in his basement, which is flooding, and work on opening it. While Cardillo and Troy climb the scaffolding, Troy almost falls, drawing the attention of the thieves who begin shooting at them. They miss and Cardillo kills one of John's henchmen as they go into the nearest apartment.

Peña and Ray go after the thieves and go to an apartment that has weapons. Cardillo is confronted by a thief who demands Bergkamp. Cardillo and Troy fight back. Cardillo tackles the thief over the balcony, falling into the concourse. Troy fatally shoots the thief and accidentally shoots Cardillo in the leg. They get to the doctor's apartment and Troy stitches up his wound. The thieves open the safe and find it empty. They have to find Bergkamp.

Ray and Peña stock up on weapons. A thief interrupts them and makes them disarm. Peña is able to kill the thief, but Ray is shot in the side. John shoots and mortally wounds Ray and captures Peña. Cardillo and Troy get to Ray and she tries to save him, to no avail. Cardillo and Troy make it back to Griffin's apartment where Griffin is bleeding out.

John takes Peña to the weapons filled apartment and demands to know where Cardillo and Bergkamp are. John reveals the painting they are looking for is in the building. While in the eye of the storm, the radios begin to work and John tells Cardillo that he has Peña, not to call for backup and demands Bergkamp and the painting. Cardillo agrees to bring Bergkamp to them. They get to the apartment, tell John where the art is and John holds them at gunpoint as they lead the way. They go into another apartment, which has a room filled with paintings. John shoots and kills Bergkamp, gets the keys to the police van and steals Cardillo's uniform. Cardillo convinces John that the paintings are decoys and that the real paintings are in other apartments so they go to find them.

Troy and Griffin leave to get medical help, but are chased and shot at by a thief. They take shelter in a basement apartment that is almost flooded to the ceiling. Troy dives down into the water to find an exit and helps Griffin through it. John gets taken to Griffin's apartment where there is a painting worth $200 million. John demands to be let into the locked room and is killed by Griffin's tiger.

== Cast ==
- Emile Hirsch as Cardillo
- Mel Gibson as Ray
- Kate Bosworth as Troy
- Stephanie Cayo as Jess Pena
- David Zayas as John
- Jasper Polish as Jasmine
- Will Catlett as Griffin
- Swen Temmel as Hodges
- Tyler Jon Olson as Dillon
- Jorge Luis Ramos as Bergkamp

== Production ==
In May 2019, Kate Bosworth and Mel Gibson were announced to star in the film, with Michael Polish directing from a screenplay by Cory Miller, altered from an earlier screenplay commissioned by E/FO Films and written by Michael Swaim and Abe Epperson. Michael and Abe were neither compensated nor credited in the final film. Further cast announcements occurred from June to September: Emile Hirsch, Stephanie Cayo, David Zayas, and Jasper Polish. Principal photography began in July 2019 in Miramar and Guaynabo, Puerto Rico. The budget was $23 million, with about $15 million spent on-location.

== Release ==
In April 2020, Lionsgate acquired distribution rights to the film. Force of Nature was released in the United States by Lionsgate Films on digital, DVD, and Blu-ray Disc on June 30, 2020.

The film was also theatrically released in several overseas countries, including Vietnam, where it debuted to $21,117.

== Reception ==
=== VOD sales ===
In its debut weekend, Force of Nature was the third-most rented film on the iTunes Store and fifth on FandangoNow. In its second weekend the film placed fourth on FandangoNow and fifth at Apple TV, as well as finishing first on Spectrum's weekly chart.

=== Critical response ===
On the review aggregator website Rotten Tomatoes, the film holds an approval rating of 8% based on 36 reviews, with an average rating of 3.6/10. On Metacritic, the film has a weighted average score of 29 out of 100, based on 11 critics, indicating "generally unfavorable" reviews.
