= See You When I See You (film) =

Upcoming film by Jay Duplass

- Directed by: Jay Duplass
- Written by: Adam Cayton-Holland
- Based on: Tragedy Plus Time: A Tragi-Comic Memoir by Adam Cayton-Holland
- Produced by: Fred Bernstein; Jay Duplass; Adam Cayton-Holland; Kumail Nanjiani; Emily V. Gordon
- Starring: Cooper Raiff; David Duchovny; Hope Davis; Kaitlyn Dever; Lucy Boynton; Ariela Barer
- Cinematography: Jim Frohna
- Edited by: Jay Deuby
- Music by: Jordan Seigel
- Production companies: Astute Films; Winter Coat Films
- Release date: January 27, 2026 (Sundance Film Festival)
- Running time: 102 minutes
- Country: United States
- Language: English

See You When I See You is a 2026 American biographical comedy-drama film directed by Jay Duplass. It is based on the memoir Tragedy Plus Time by Adam Cayton-Holland. The film stars Cooper Raiff, David Duchovny, Hope Davis, Kaitlyn Dever, Lucy Boynton, and Ariela Barer.

== Premise ==
Aaron (Cooper Raiff), a young comedy writer, battles PTSD and struggles to come to terms with the death of his sister and best friend, Leah (Kaitlyn Dever). With the help of his family, he navigates the toll that avoiding his grief takes on his life.

== Cast ==
- Cooper Raiff as Aaron Whistler
- David Duchovny as Robert Whistler, Aaron's and Leah's father
- Hope Davis as Paige Whistler, Aaron and Leah's mother
- Kaitlyn Dever as Leah Whistler, Aaron's deceased younger sister and best friend
- Lucy Boynton as Emily Whistler
- Ariela Barer as Camila
- Kumail Nanjiani as Adeel
- Poorna Jagannathan as Dr. Anya

== Production ==
The film was announced on August 22, 2024. Filming began in October 2024 in Atlanta.

== Release ==
See You When I See You premiered at the Sundance Film Festival on January 27, 2026.

== Reception ==
On the review aggregator website Rotten Tomatoes, 71% of 21 critics' reviews are positive. Metacritic, which uses a weighted average, assigned the film a score of 51 out of 100, based on 10 critics, indicating "mixed or average" reviews.
