= Cha Cha Real Smooth =

2022 American film by Cooper Raiff

- Theatrical release poster
- Directed by: Cooper Raiff
- Written by: Cooper Raiff
- Produced by: Ro Donnelly; Erik Feig; Dakota Johnson; Cooper Raiff; Jessica Switch
- Starring: Dakota Johnson; Cooper Raiff; Raúl Castillo; Odeya Rush; Evan Assante; Vanessa Burghardt; Brad Garrett; Leslie Mann
- Cinematography: Cristina Dunlap
- Edited by: Henry Hayes
- Music by: Este Haim; Chris Stracey
- Production companies: Picturestart; Endeavor Content; TeaTime Pictures
- Distributed by: Apple TV+
- Release dates: January 23, 2022 (Sundance); June 17, 2022 (United States)
- Running time: 107 minutes
- Country: United States
- Language: English

Cha Cha Real Smooth is a 2022 American romantic comedy drama film written, produced, and directed by Cooper Raiff. The plot centers on a 22-year-old college graduate (Raiff) who starts making money as a party starter while he also strikes up a relationship with a fascinating 32-year-old mother (Dakota Johnson, who also produced the film). The cast also includes Raúl Castillo, Odeya Rush, Evan Assante, Vanessa Burghardt, Brad Garrett, and Leslie Mann.

It premiered at the 2022 Sundance Film Festival on January 23, 2022, and was released in limited theaters and streaming on Apple TV+ on June 17, 2022. The film received positive reviews from critics.

== Plot ==
Twelve-year-old New Jersey resident Andrew asks a party host out on a date; she rejects him due to their age difference. Ten years later, Andrew's girlfriend, Maya, moves to Barcelona to finish her Fulbright. Andrew is asked to take his twelve-year-old brother David to a bat mitzvah, where Andrew encourages the kids to dance. He meets Domino and her autistic daughter, Lola. Andrew's peers have been spreading rumors about Domino. Andrew introduces himself and manages to take Lola to the dance floor, surprising Domino. The mothers at the party take notice of his charisma and agree to hire Andrew as a party starter at upcoming bar and bat mitzvahs. He dubs himself the Jig Conductor and plans to use the money to reunite with Maya in Barcelona.

Andrew is removed as DJ from his next party for confronting a child who bullied Lola. He finds Domino in the restroom, covered in blood. He and Lola find her a change of clothes; Andrew drives them home. Domino tells Andrew she has a fiancé, Joseph, working in Chicago. She reveals the blood was not from her period but caused by a recent miscarriage. Domino hires Andrew as Lola's sitter, and then makes a pass at him, but he declines. Andrew later has sex with his friend, Macy. Andrew spends the next day talking to David and interviewing for a job as an intern. Andrew meets Joseph at a party and later spends time with Domino and Lola. Andrew starts to think Maya is dating someone in Barcelona; his mother comforts him. Andrew helps Lola go to sleep by scratching her back, an activity she had previously only allowed Domino to do. Andrew sees Domino and Joseph in a bad mood before he leaves.

Andrew gets the intern job. He and Domino talk about her engagement with Joseph and they kiss. Back home, Andrew and David have an argument. Joseph fires Andrew from his job as Lola's sitter. David almost experiences his first kiss but leaves to stop some kids bullying Lola. A fight between Andrew's family and the other guests at the bar mitzvah ensues. Andrew tells Domino he loves her. She rejects his advances, telling him that she is in love with Joseph, even when it does not appear she is. Joseph thanks Andrew for taking care of his family. Andrew decides he does not want to go to Barcelona. Instead, he plans to move out. Andrew and Domino say goodbye. She encourages him to live his life to the fullest before making any commitments. David tells Andrew he had his first kiss at school. Six months later, Domino and Joseph are married, while Andrew has fun dancing at a bar with his friends.

== Cast ==
- Cooper Raiff as Andrew, a Tulane University graduate who has recently moved back home
  - Javien Mercado as twelve-year-old Andrew
- Dakota Johnson as Domino
- Evan Assante as David, Andrew's younger brother
- Vanessa Burghardt as Lola, Domino's daughter
- Leslie Mann as Lisa, Andrew's mother
- Brad Garrett as Stepdad Greg
- Raúl Castillo as Joseph, Domino's fiancé
- Colton Osorio as Rodrigo, David's friend
- Amara Pedroso Saquel as Maya, Andrew's girlfriend
- Odeya Rush as Macy, Andrew's friend from high school
- Brooklyn Sloane Ramirez as Margaret
- Kelly O'Sullivan as Bella
- Shane Stadtlander as Nicky The Bar Mitzvah Boy

== Production ==
The film was announced in March 2021, with Dakota Johnson and Cooper Raiff set to star. In August, Leslie Mann, Brad Garrett, Raúl Castillo, Odeya Rush, Vanessa Burghardt, Evan Assante and Colton Osorio joined the cast. Principal photography began on August 12, 2021, with filming taking place in Pittsburgh.

== Release ==
It premiered at the 2022 Sundance Film Festival on January 23, 2022. Afterwards, Apple TV+ acquired the film's distribution rights for $15 million, beating out studios and streamers including Netflix, Sony Pictures and Amazon Studios. The film showed at SXSW on March 18, 2022. The film also screened at the Tribeca Film Festival in June 2022. It was released on June 17, 2022, simultaneously in limited theaters and on Apple TV+. The soundtrack was released as a digital EP the same day.

== Reception ==
=== Critical response ===
On the review aggregator website Rotten Tomatoes, 85% of 218 critics' reviews are positive, with an average rating of 7.7/10. The website's consensus reads: "A touching dramedy that wears its heart proudly on its sleeve, Cha Cha Real Smooth further affirms writer-director-star Cooper Raiff as a talent to watch." Metacritic, which uses a weighted average, assigned the film a score of 69 out of 100, based on 42 critics, indicating "generally favorable" reviews.

Christy Lemire of Roger Ebert.com gave the film a positive review writing, "Raiff's ambition to break free from sentimental formula and forge a path of his own is clear, making him an exciting young filmmaker to watch."

Film critic Manohla Dargis of The New York Times panned the film, writing, "It's derivative and unpersuasive, and as pandering as any big studio soft sell" adding about the film's central romance: "Their relationship never makes sense; but, then, neither does most of the movie."

=== Awards and nominations ===
Award	Date of ceremony	Category	Recipient(s)	Result	Ref.
Sundance Film Festival	January 2022	Grand Jury Prize - U.S. Dramatic Competition	Cha Cha Real Smooth	Nominated	
Sundance Film Festival	January 2022	Audience Award - U.S. Dramatic Competition	Cha Cha Real Smooth	Won	
Hollywood Critics Association Midseason Film Awards	July 1, 2022	Best Picture	Cha Cha Real Smooth	Nominated	
Hollywood Critics Association Midseason Film Awards	July 1, 2022	Best Supporting Actress	Dakota Johnson	Nominated	
Hollywood Critics Association Midseason Film Awards	July 1, 2022	Best Screenplay	Cooper Raiff	Nominated	
