= All That She Wants (2026 film) =

Upcoming romantic comedy film

- Directed by: Andrew Rhymer; Scarlett Bermingham
- Written by: David West Read
- Produced by: Tim Headington; Theresa Steele Page; Lindsay Tapscott; Katie Bird Nolan; Lauren Shelton
- Starring: Annie Murphy; Cooper Raiff; Zosia Mamet; John Gemberling; Finn Wittrock; Bill Irwin; Christine Baranski
- Production companies: Ley Line Entertainment; Babe Nation Films
- Release date: September 13, 2026 (TIFF)
- Running time: 95 minutes
- Countries: United States; Canada
- Language: English

All That She Wants is a 2026 romantic comedy film directed by Andrew Rhymer and Scarlett Bermingham and written by David West Read. It stars Annie Murphy, Cooper Raiff, Zosia Mamet, John Gemberling, Finn Wittrock, Bill Irwin, and Christine Baranski. It premiered at the 2026 Toronto International Film Festival.

== Premise ==
Following a difficult breakup, Emma (Annie Murphy) hooks up with a charming younger man named Luke (Cooper Raiff). She soon realizes that she used to be his babysitter, turning an embarrassing one-night stand into an unexpected connection.

== Cast ==
- Annie Murphy as Emma
- Cooper Raiff as Luke
- Zosia Mamet
- John Gemberling
- Finn Wittrock
- Bill Irwin
- Christine Baranski

== Production ==
The film is produced by Tim Headington, Theresa Steele Page, and Lauren Shelton of Ley Line Entertainment, alongside Lindsay Tapscott and Katie Bird Nolan of Babe Nation Films. Annie Murphy, David West Read, and David Darby serve as executive producers.

The project marks a re-teaming of writer David West Read and Ley Line Entertainment following their collaboration on the musical & Juliet.

Principal photography took place in Toronto. Filming began on September 8, 2025, and was reported as wrapped on November 7, 2025.

== Reception ==
Metacritic, which uses a weighted average, assigned the film a score of 72 out of 100, based on 4 critics, indicating "generally favorable reviews".
