= Not Waving but Drowning (film) =

Not Waving But Drowning
- Film poster
- Directed by: Devyn Waitt
- Screenplay by: Devyn Waitt
- Story by: Amy Hempel
- Produced by: Nicole Emanuele
- Starring: Vanessa Ray; Megan Guinan; Lynn Cohen
- Cinematography: Nathan Levine-Heaney
- Edited by: Dylan Correll
- Music by: John Ross
- Production company: White Horse Pictures
- Release date: June 2012 (Champs-Élysées)
- Running time: 100 minutes
- Country: United States
- Language: English

Not Waving But Drowning is a 2012 drama film directed by Devyn Waitt, starring Vanessa Ray and Megan Guinan. A small town girl (Vanessa Ray) moves to New York City, and laments being separated from her best friend (Megan Guinan) while forging rewarding new relationships in director Devyn Waitt's feature-length companion piece to the short film The Most Girl Part of You (2011).

The film premiered in the 2012 Champs-Élysées Film Festival in Paris, France.

== Plot summary ==
The title is a reference to a poem of the same name by English poet Stevie Smith, in which a dead man berates those who failed to notice or acknowledge the circumstances leading to his death.

Leaving small-town life in her dust, Adele moves wide-eyed to New York City, and her best friend Sara is stuck in their boring hometown. Separate for the first time in their lives, the film charts their new relationships, while beautiful background music sequences capture fleeting emotions as their lives move in unexpected directions.

== Cast ==
- Vanessa Ray as Adele
- Megan Guinan as Sara
- Lynn Cohen as Sylvia
- Scott Bryce as Damon
- Adam Driver as Adam
- Isabelle McNally as Kim
- Lili Reinhart as Amy
- Ryan Munzert as Big Guy
- Keith Pratt as Keith
- Elizabeth Fendrick as Maggie
- Ross Francis
- Trinity Rose Smith as Lila
