= Cooper Raiff =

American filmmaker and actor

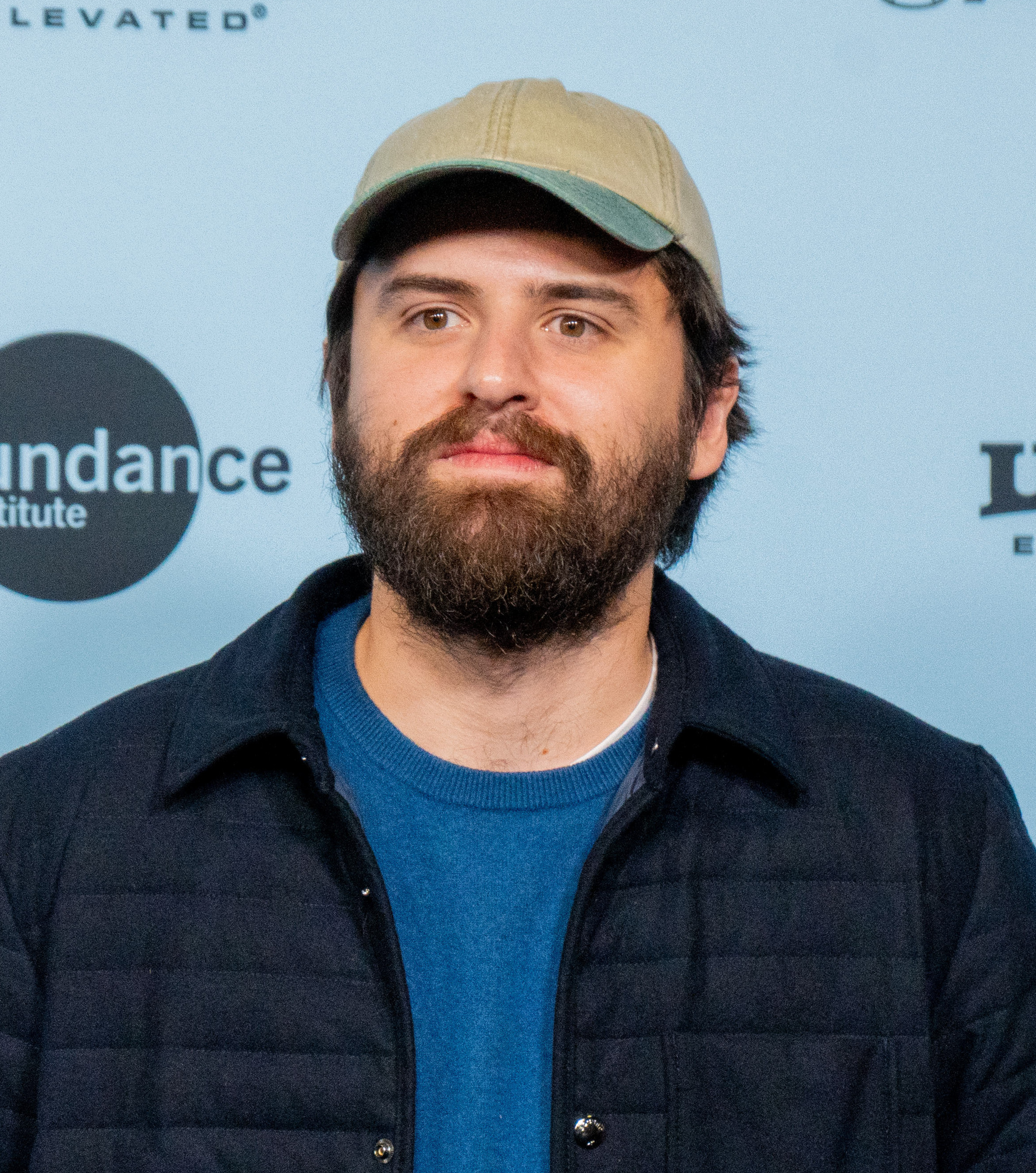
- Raiff in 2025
- Born: Cooper Michael Raiff; February 11, 1997 (age 29); Dallas, Texas, U.S.
- Occupations: Filmmaker; actor
- Years active: 2018–present

Cooper Michael Raiff (born February 11, 1997) is an American filmmaker and actor. He has received praise for his films Shithouse (2020) and Cha Cha Real Smooth (2022). In August 2022, Raiff launched his production company Small Ideas.

== Early life ==
A native of Dallas, Raiff attended the Greenhill School. He participated in school theatre productions and studied at the Dallas Young Actors Studio for 4 years. During his senior year, he wrote and performed in his first play. Raiff enrolled at Occidental College in Los Angeles, withdrawing in 2019 to focus on film.

== Career ==
During spring break in 2018, Raiff stayed on campus to make Madeline & Cooper, a 50-minute short film that he uploaded to YouTube. He then tweeted a link of the video to filmmaker Jay Duplass, who met with Raiff and encouraged him to adapt the project to feature-length; it became Raiff's debut feature Shithouse, in which he starred, directed, wrote, produced, and co-edited. The film premiered at the 2020 SXSW where it was named Best Narrative Feature. Distributed by IFC Films, it opened in October 2020 to positive reviews.

In August 2021, it was announced that Raiff was attached to direct and co-write a television adaptation of Naoise Dolan's novel Exciting Times starring Phoebe Dynevor for Amazon Prime.

Raiff's second film, Cha Cha Real Smooth, premiered at the 2022 Sundance Film Festival, where it won the Audience Award for the Dramatic Competition, and is available on Apple TV. The film was reportedly purchased by the company for $15 million. He appeared on the 2022 Variety list of directors to watch.

In July 2022, it was announced that Raiff would direct The Trashers, a drama starring David Harbour and Cooper Hoffman. However, Raiff later revealed in 2025 that the film had been cancelled due to financing issues.

On August 2, 2022, Raiff partnered with Clementine Quittner of Black Bear Productions to launch his own production company, Small Ideas. Later that year, he was given the Maverick Award at the 2022 Newport Beach Film Festival and appeared on the Forbes 30 Under 30 list in Hollywood & Entertainment.

In 2023, Raiff filmed his first television series, Hal & Harper, starring alongside Mark Ruffalo and Lili Reinhart.

In October 2024, it was announced that Raiff had been cast as Aaron in the family comedy-drama See You When I See You, directed by Jay Duplass. The film is based on Adam Cayton-Holland's memoir Tragedy Plus Time and co-stars David Duchovny, Hope Davis, and Kaitlyn Dever. It is set to premiere at the 2026 Sundance Film Festival.

In November 2025, it was announced that Raiff would star opposite Annie Murphy in the romantic comedy All That She Wants.

Raiff has cited Emma Seligman, Sofia Coppola, Greta Gerwig, Ryan Coogler, and the Duplass brothers as influences.

== Filmography ==
=== Film ===
Year	Title	Director	Writer	Producer	Actor	Role	Notes
2018	Madeline & Cooper	Yes	Yes	Yes	Yes	Cooper	Short film
2020	Shithouse	Yes	Yes	Yes	Yes	Alex Malmquist	Also editor
2022	Cha Cha Real Smooth	Yes	Yes	Yes	Yes	Andrew	
2026	See You When I See You	No	No	No	Yes	Aaron	Premieres at the 2026 Sundance Film Festival
2026	All That She Wants	No	No	No	Yes	Luke	

=== Television ===
Year	Title	Director	Writer	Producer	Actor	Role	Notes
2025	Hal & Harper	Yes	Yes	Yes	Yes	Hal	

== Awards and recognition ==
Year	Association	Category	Nominated work	Result	Ref.
2020	Zurich Film Festival	Best International Feature Film	Shithouse	Nominated	
2020	SXSW Film Festival	Narrative Feature	Shithouse	Won	
2022	Sundance Film Festival	Grand Jury Prize	Cha Cha Real Smooth	Nominated	
2022	Palm Springs International Film Festival	Directors to Watch	Cha Cha Real Smooth	Won	
