= Shithouse (film) =

2020 film by Cooper Raiff

- Theatrical release poster
- Directed by: Cooper Raiff
- Written by: Cooper Raiff
- Produced by: Cooper Raiff; Will Youmans; Divi Crockett
- Starring: Cooper Raiff; Dylan Gelula; Logan Miller; Amy Landecker
- Cinematography: Rachel Klein
- Edited by: Cooper Raiff; Autumn Dea
- Music by: Jack Kraus
- Production company: CMR Productions
- Distributed by: IFC Films
- Release date: October 16, 2020 (United States)
- Running time: 99 minutes
- Country: United States
- Language: English
- Box office: $18,370

Shithouse (bowdlerized in marketing material as S#!%house and released in some territories as Freshman Year) is a 2020 American coming-of-age comedy-drama film written, directed, and produced by Cooper Raiff, in his directorial debut. It stars Raiff, Dylan Gelula, Logan Miller, and Amy Landecker.

The film was set to have its world premiere at South by Southwest in March 2020, but the festival was cancelled due to the COVID-19 pandemic. The South by Southwest film competition nevertheless went ahead, and Shithouse won the Grand Jury Prize for Best Narrative Feature. It was released in the United States on October 16, 2020, by IFC Films.

== Plot ==
Alex is a lonely college freshman struggling to adjust to college life, lying to his mother by inventing a best friend and girlfriend to conceal his lack of social life. One night, desperate to get out of his dorm, he attends a party at the "Shithouse" fraternity with his roommate, Sam, with whom he has a distant relationship. At the party, he bonds with Maggie, the sophomore residential advisor of his dorm. Though Maggie briefly leaves for an unfulfilling hookup with another student, she and Alex reconnect later that night and hang out. Alex fails to perform during their attempted hookup. Afterwards, the two genuinely bond, with Alex revealing his difficulties in connecting with other students, insecurity at living away from his family, and the death of his father. In turn, Maggie opens up about her estrangement from her own father, the unexpected grief over a recent loss of her pet turtle, and her secret dreams of acting. After spontaneously joining an impromptu night baseball game with a group of other students, they return to the dorms to drink and have sex.

The next morning, Maggie is aloof and irritated by Alex's presence, which leaves him hurt and confused. He tries to reconnect with her in overbearing ways, such as sending her long messages on Instagram and liking all of her photos. In turn, Maggie ignores him when encountering him in front of her friends. Alex decides to make a sincere effort in bonding with Sam, and they go to another party that night, which Maggie is also attending. Maggie treats Alex in a friendly way again, which he misinterprets as an invitation to reconnect, but when he later finds her hooking up with another student, they devolve into fighting. Alex accuses Maggie of toying with his feelings and pretending that they did not share a connection, while Maggie blames him for being clingy and placing too much weight on their encounter. They walk away believing the other is immature: Maggie thinks Alex is naïve and entitled, while Alex believes Maggie uses sex as a crutch to cover up for her unhappy childhood and fear of real intimacy.

Alex takes the time to open himself up to socializing, taking care of Sam, connecting with strangers, and hanging out with the students he met at the baseball game. Later, he calls his mother and tearfully reveals that he has been lying to her and says that while he does love her and his sister back home, he needs to try harder to put an effort into enjoying his college years instead of leaning on them. His mother agrees but assures him that his family will always be there when he needs them. That night, he encounters Maggie throwing her old terrarium away, and he assists her before they part ways. Maggie, having thought hard about Alex's earlier words, returns to her dorm and likes some of Alex's Instagram photos.

Two and a half years later, Alex has many friends—including Sam and Maggie—and is fully involved in college life. Maggie, now taking a chance by appearing in plays, meets up with Alex after a performance and asks to be his girlfriend. Alex agrees on the condition that they both be good partners to each other. She accepts, and they go outside for an impromptu game of baseball.

== Cast ==
- Cooper Raiff as Alex Malmquist
- Dylan Gelula as Maggie Hill
- Amy Landecker as Mrs. Malmquist, Alex's mother
- Logan Miller as Sam
- Olivia Welch as Jess Malmquist, Alex's sister
- Abby Quinn as Georgia
- Joy Sunday as Sophia
- Chinedu Unaka as Timothy
- Juan Wood as Charlie
- Adan Rocha as Scott
- Ashley Padilla as DG
- Jay Duplass as Professor Notkin (uncredited)
- Ayo Edebiri as Emily (uncredited)
- Eva Victor as Michelle (uncredited)

== Production ==
Shithouse began as a fifty-minute YouTube video, shot over five days during spring break at Occidental College in March 2018, performed by Cooper Raiff and his then-girlfriend, Madeline Hill, with Will Youmans as camera operator. Raiff then tweeted a link to the video to filmmaker and actor Jay Duplass, who suggested using it as the basis for a feature-length project. Duplass expressed interest in directing the film, but was unable to due to scheduling issues.

Raiff dropped out of Occidental in early 2019 to devote more effort into making the film, which was shot over two weeks in Los Angeles in August 2019. For cost reasons, the production could not secure official clearance to shoot on Occidental's campus, so principal photography took place without permits, with Raiff claiming he was making "a student short with no money" when asked.

== Release ==
The film was scheduled to have its world premiere at South by Southwest on March 14, 2020, but the festival was cancelled due to the COVID-19 pandemic. On June 10, 2020, IFC Films acquired North American distribution rights to the film. It was released on October 16, 2020.

In the United Kingdom, the film was released under the title Freshman Year.

== Critical reception ==
On the review aggregator website Rotten Tomatoes, the film holds an approval rating of 94% based on 72 reviews, with an average rating of 7.4/10. The website's critics' consensus reads, "A disarmingly tender look at young adult ennui, this Shithouse don't stink." According to Metacritic, which sampled 18 critics and calculated a weighted average score of 72 out of 100, the film received "generally favorable reviews".

At South by Southwest, the film won the Grand Jury Prize for Best Narrative Feature.
