= Lili Reinhart =

American actress (born 1996)

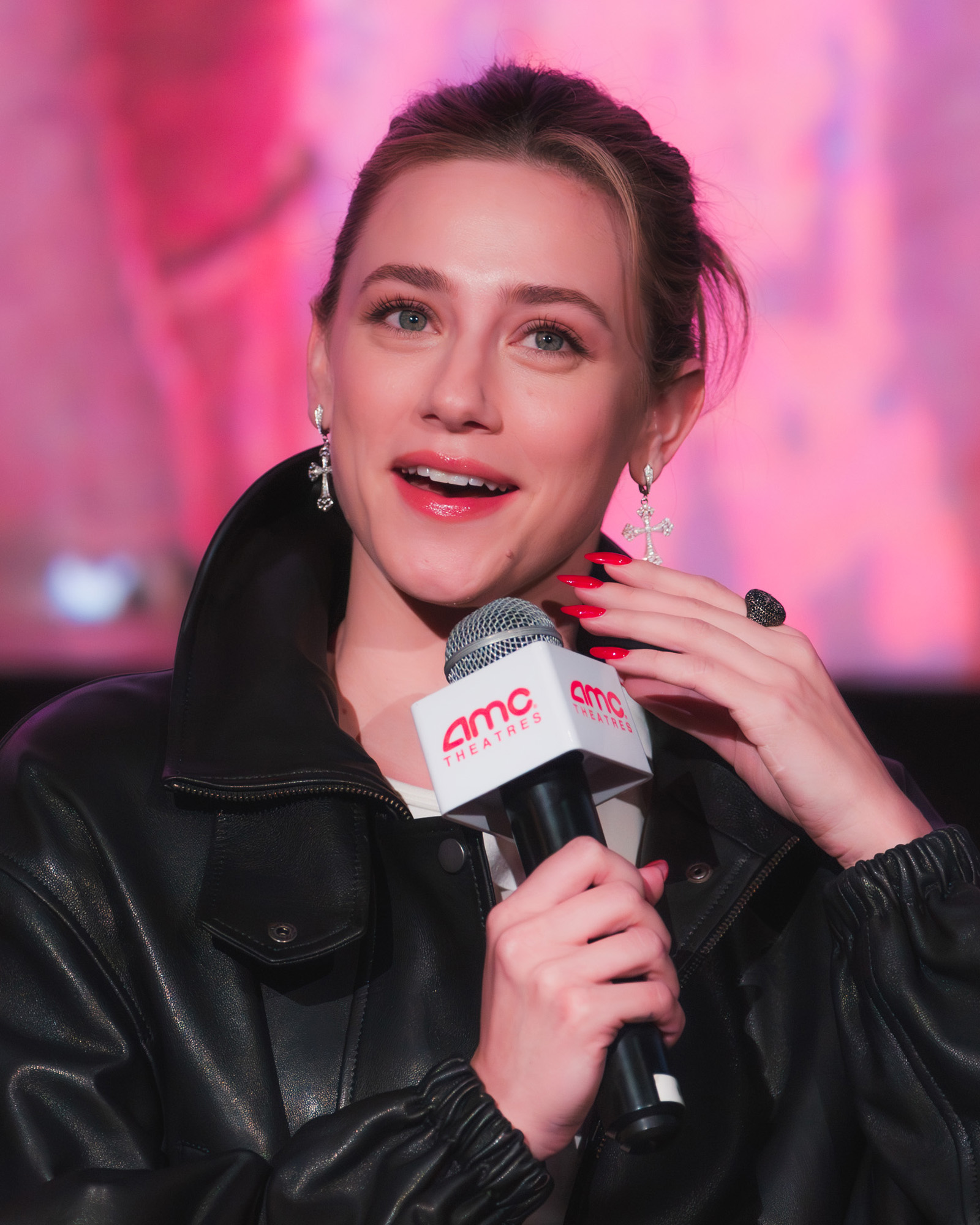
- Reinhart in 2026
- Born: Lili Pauline Reinhart; September 13, 1996 (age 30); Cleveland, Ohio, U.S.
- Occupation: Actress
- Years active: 2010–present

Lili Pauline Reinhart (born September 13, 1996) is an American actress. She portrayed Betty Cooper on the CW teen drama series Riverdale (2017–2023) earning seven Teen Choice Awards as well as nominations for a Critics' Choice Award and three People's Choice Awards.

Reinhart's early film work includes supporting roles in The Kings of Summer (2013), Miss Stevens (2016), and Hustlers (2019). She has since taken leading roles in, and served as an executive producer, for the romance films Chemical Hearts (2020), Look Both Ways (2022), and The Love Hypothesis (2026), as well as the crime drama American Sweatshop (2025) and the comedy-drama miniseries Hal & Harper (2025).

== Early life ==
Reinhart was born in Cleveland, Ohio, to Amy and Daniel Reinhart, and raised in the nearby town of Bay Village. She is of German and French descent and has stated her surname is of German origin. Reinhart is the middle of three sisters. She developed a love for singing, acting, and dancing at the age of 10, and asked her mother to drive her to New York City for auditions. Reinhart moved to Charlotte, North Carolina, when she was 16 years old. Reinhart moved to Los Angeles when she was 18 years old to pursue acting and after five months, she returned home to Charlotte, North Carolina, and worked with a therapist.

== Career ==
=== 2010–2016: Early roles ===
Reinhart starred in the television pilot for Scientastic! (2010) and guest starred on the television series Law & Order: Special Victims Unit (2011). She also starred in the films Lilith (2011), Not Waving But Drowning (2012), The Kings of Summer (2013), Gibsonburg (2013), Forever's End (2013), Miss Stevens (2016), and The Good Neighbor (2016).

=== 2017–2023: Breakthrough with Riverdale ===
On February 9, 2016, Reinhart was cast as Betty Cooper in the CW's teen drama television series Riverdale, based on the characters of Archie Comics. Series creator Roberto Aguirre-Sacasa originally sought out Kiernan Shipka for the role after seeing her work in Mad Men. Reinhart auditioned twice for the role, first sending in an audition tape from her North Carolina home before appearing in person a month later. The series premiered on January 26, 2017, and in February 2021, it was renewed for a sixth season. Previously, Reinhart worked on the Fox sitcom Surviving Jack. In 2017, Reinhart was cast in Galveston, based on Nic Pizzolatto's 2010 novel. In the film, directed by Mélanie Laurent, Reinhart plays Tiffany, who was placed for adoption as a child. The film premiered at South by Southwest on March 10, 2018, and received a limited theatrical release through RLJE Films on October 19, 2018. Galveston received mixed critical reviews and grossed only $190,320 at the box office.

Reinhart joined the cast of Lorene Scafaria's Hustlers in March 2019. Reinhart played Annabelle, "the baby of the group," a former stripper who joins Ramona and her crew in drugging and robbing their Wall Street clientele. Reinhart described her character's aesthetic as "slutty Hannah Montana." A running gag shows Annabelle vomiting in times of stress, and the fake vomit was made of animal crackers and Sprite. Hustlers premiered at the Toronto International Film Festival on September 7, 2019, and was theatrically released in the United States the next week. The film received positive critical reviews and grossed $157.6 million worldwide. The same year, Reinhart made a cameo appearance during the mid-credits scene of Elizabeth Banks' Charlie's Angels (2019).

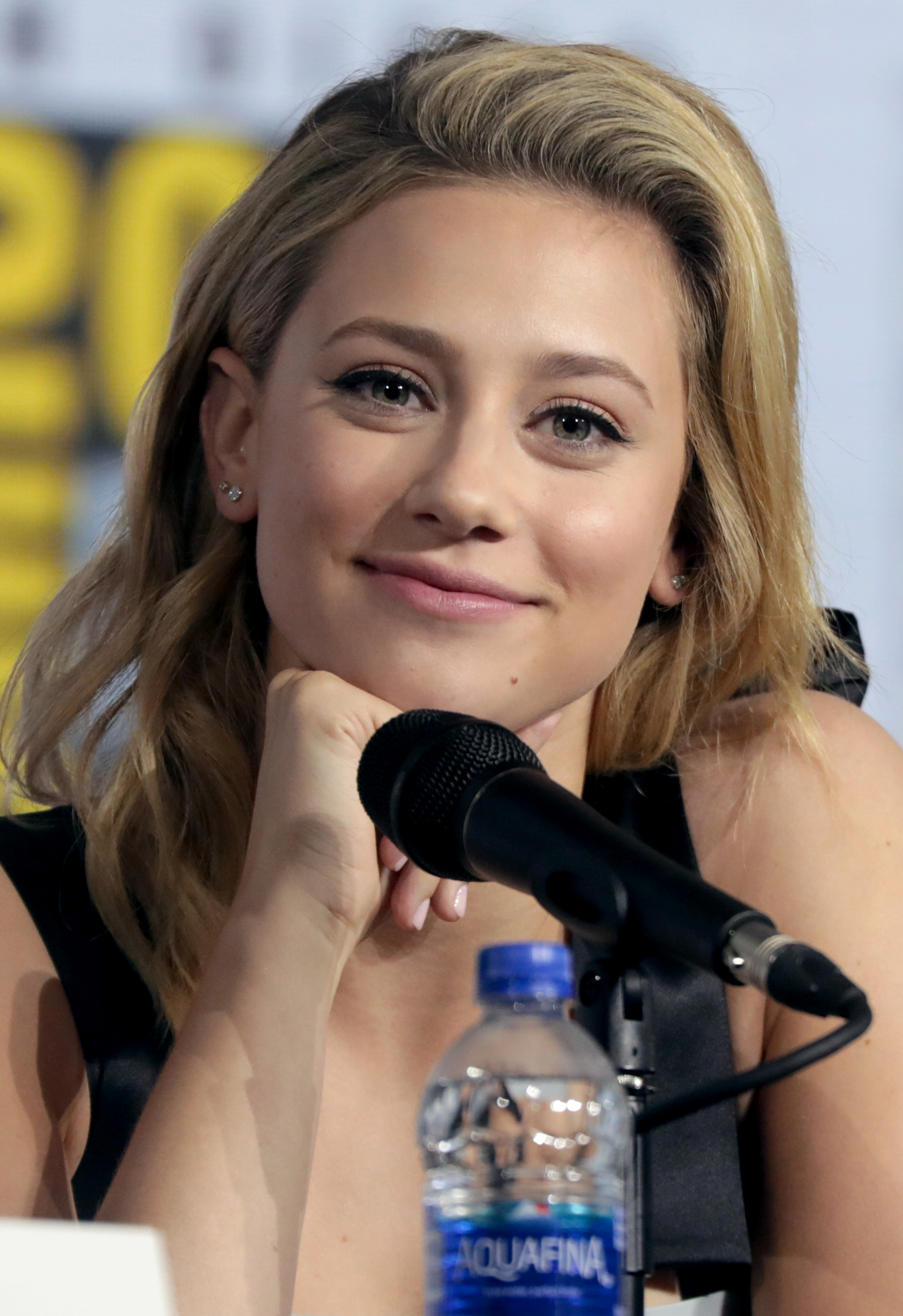
Reinhart in 2019

In June 2019, it was announced that Reinhart would star as the female lead of Amazon Studios' romantic drama film Chemical Hearts, written and directed by Richard Tanne and based on the 2016 Krystal Sutherland novel Our Chemical Hearts. Reinhart played Grace Town, a physically disabled high school senior who falls in love with school newspaper writer Henry Page. In addition to starring, Chemical Hearts was Reinhart's first executive producer credit. The film was released on August 21, 2020, on Amazon Prime Video and received mixed reviews.

In May 2020, Reinhart voiced Bella-Ella, "a ... snooty rich [girl]" in the Simpsons episode "The Hateful Eight-Year-Olds". In March 2021, it was announced that Reinhart would star in Wanuri Kahiu's Look Both Ways as Natalie, a college student whose life diverges into two parallel realities on the eve of her college graduation. In one reality, she becomes pregnant and must navigate motherhood as a young adult; in the other, she moves to LA to pursue her career. In addition to starring in the film, Look Both Ways was Reinhart's second executive producer credit.

In June 2021, Reinhart's production company, Small Victory Productions, signed a deal with Amazon Studios. Small Victory Productions will develop original and adapted content for film and television with a focus on modern, young adult content that celebrates diversity and inclusivity, as well as supporting new voices.

=== 2024–present ===
In 2025, she acted in and served as an executive producer for the Netflix thriller American Sweatshop. The film received positive reviews, with critics praising her performance. Brian Tallerico of Roger Ebert.com wrote that he was "impressed by the choices made by Reinhart" in a dramatic role. That same year, she also served as an executive producer for and starred in the independent dramedy miniseries Hal & Harper (2025), which premiered at the Sundance Film Festival and debuted on Mubi. Ben Travers, television critic for IndieWire, highlighted Reinhart's performance among the cast as being "stellar". She received a nomination for the Gotham Award for Outstanding Lead Performance in a Limited or Anthology Series.

== Other ventures ==
In October 2019, Reinhart was announced as an ambassador for American Express for the relaunch of its AmexGreen Card. That same month, Reinhart became a spokesperson and ambassador for CoverGirl.

In September 2020, Reinhart released a book of poetry titled Swimming Lessons: Poems. The book explores themes such as "young love, anxiety, depression, fame, and heartbreak". For the week of October 18, 2020, Swimming Lessons: Poems debuted at No. 2 on The New York Times Best Seller list for paperback trade fiction. She launched a skincare line called Personal Day in 2024.

== Personal life ==
Reinhart practices Transcendental Meditation and is training to be a reiki healer. In June 2020, she came out as bisexual. In an Instagram story, she stated that she would be attending an LGBTQ for Black Lives Matter protest in Los Angeles.

Reinhart was diagnosed with depression at age 14. She has also opened up about her experiences with anxiety and body dysmorphia. In January 2024, she was diagnosed with alopecia. In 2025, she revealed that she was on antidepressants and struggling with attention deficit hyperactivity disorder, severe premenstrual dysphoric disorder, and endometriosis.

In 2026, Reinhart sparked online debate and viral reactions when she attended a Q&A event for the film Forbidden Fruits wearing a white tank top emblazoned with the phrase "I support a man's right to shut the fuck up". The fashion magazine Marie Claire defended "her right to wear this tank top whenever she wants", and the fashion magazine L'Officiel praised the clarity and consistency of the outfit.

== Filmography ==
Key
†	Denotes films that have not yet been released

=== Film ===
Year	Title	Role	Notes	Ref.
2011	Lilith	Lilith Wilson		
2012	Not Waving but Drowning	Amy		
2013	The Kings of Summer	Vicki		
2013	Gibsonburg	Kathy Colaner		
2013	Forever's End	Lily White		
2016	Miss Stevens	Margot Jensen		
2016	The Good Neighbor	Ashley		
2018	Galveston	Adult Tiffany		
2019	Hustlers	Annabelle		
2019	Charlie's Angels	Angel Recruit	Cameo appearance	
2020	Chemical Hearts	Grace Town	Also executive producer	
2022	Jennifer Lopez: Halftime	Herself	Documentary film; interview clip	
2022	Look Both Ways	Natalie Bennett	Also executive producer	
2025	American Sweatshop	Daisy Moriarty	Also executive producer	
2026	Forbidden Fruits	Apple		
2026	The Love Hypothesis	Olive Smith	Also executive producer	

=== Television ===
Year	Title	Role	Notes	Ref.
2010	Scientastic!	Leah	Episode: "Sticks and Stones"	
2011	Law & Order: Special Victims Unit	Courtney Lane	Episode: "Lost Traveller"	
2014	Surviving Jack	Heather Blumeyer	Recurring role	
2015	Cocked	Marguerite Paxson	Television film	
2017–2023	Riverdale	Elizabeth "Betty" Cooper	Main role	
2020	One World: Together at Home	Herself	Television special	
2020	The Simpsons	Bella-Ella (voice)	Episode: "The Hateful Eight-Year-Olds"	
2025	Hal & Harper	Harper	Main role; also executive producer	

=== Podcast ===
Year	Title	Role	Notes	Ref.
2022	On Purpose with Jay Shetty	Herself	Episode: "Lili Reinhart ON: Living With Anxiety & Giving Yourself Permission to Feel All of Your Emotions"	

=== Music videos ===
Year	Title	Artist(s)	Ref.
2026	"Swim"	BTS	
2026	"Do Me Right"	Mr. Fantasy	

== Discography ==
List of Lili Reinhart soundtrack appearances
Title	Year	Album
"Jigsaw" (with Charity Farrell)	2013	Forever's End
"In" (with KJ Apa, Camila Mendes, Madelaine Petsch, Vanessa Morgan, Shannon Purser, Casey Cott, Emilija Baranac, Cody Kearsley, Ashleigh Murray)	2018	Riverdale: Special Episode – Carrie the Musical (Original Television Soundtrack)
"Do Me a Favor" (with KJ Apa, Camila Mendes, Jordan Calloway)	2018	Riverdale: Special Episode – Carrie the Musical (Original Television Soundtrack)
"The World According to Chris" (with Camila Mendes, Vanessa Morgan, Shannon Purser)	2018	Riverdale: Special Episode – Carrie the Musical (Original Television Soundtrack)
"You Shine" (with KJ Apa, Camila Mendes)	2018	Riverdale: Special Episode – Carrie the Musical (Original Television Soundtrack)
"A Night We'll Never Forget" (with KJ Apa, Camila Mendes, Madelaine Petsch, Vanessa Morgan, Shannon Purser, Casey Cott, Emilija Baranac, Cody Kearsley, Ashleigh Murray, Mädchen Amick, Jordan Calloway)	2018	Riverdale: Special Episode – Carrie the Musical (Original Television Soundtrack)
"Mad World" (with KJ Apa, Camila Mendes)	2018	Riverdale: Season 2 (Original Television Soundtrack)
"Beautiful" (with Casey Cott, Madelaine Petsch, Camila Mendes, Ashleigh Murray, KJ Apa, Cole Sprouse, Charles Melton, Jordan Connor, Drew Ray Tanner, Zoé De Grand'Maison, Bernadette Beck)	2019	Riverdale: Special Episode – Heathers the Musical (Original Television Soundtrack)
"Candy Store" (with Madelaine Petsch, Camila Mendes, Vanessa Morgan, Bernadette Beck)	2019	Riverdale: Special Episode – Heathers the Musical (Original Television Soundtrack)
"Big Fun" (with Zoé De Grand'Maison, Casey Cott, Charles Melton, Madelaine Petsch, Vanessa Morgan, Bernadette Beck, KJ Apa, Camila Mendes, Ashleigh Murray, Jordan Connor, Drew Ray Tanner)	2019	Riverdale: Special Episode – Heathers the Musical (Original Television Soundtrack)
"Seventeen" (with Cole Sprouse, Vanessa Morgan, Madelaine Petsch)	2019	Riverdale: Special Episode – Heathers the Musical (Original Television Soundtrack)
"Seventeen (Reprise)" (with Madelaine Petsch, Camila Mendes, Ashleigh Murray, Vanessa Morgan, Cole Sprouse, KJ Apa, Jordan Connor, Casey Cott, Charles Melton, Zoé De Grand'Maison, Drew Ray Tanner)	2019	Riverdale: Special Episode – Heathers the Musical (Original Television Soundtrack)
"Dream Warriors" (with KJ Apa, Ashleigh Murray, Camila Mendes)	2019	Riverdale: Season 3 (Original Television Soundtrack)
"Wicked Little Town" (with Riverdale cast)	2020	Riverdale: Special Episode – Hedwig and the Angry Inch the Musical (Original Television Soundtrack)
"Random Number Generation" (with KJ Apa, Camila Mendes, Madelaine Petsch, Casey Cott, Charles Melton, Vanessa Morgan, Drew Ray Tanner, Jordan Connor)	2020	Riverdale: Special Episode – Hedwig and the Angry Inch the Musical (Original Television Soundtrack)
"Wig in a Box" (with Camila Mendes, Madelaine Petsch, Casey Cott, Vanessa Morgan)	2020	Riverdale: Special Episode – Hedwig and the Angry Inch the Musical (Original Television Soundtrack)
"Exquisite Corpse" (with KJ Apa, Camila Mendes, Cole Sprouse)	2020	Riverdale: Special Episode – Hedwig and the Angry Inch the Musical (Original Television Soundtrack)
"The Origin of Love" (with KJ Apa, Camila Mendes, Cole Sprouse)	2020	Riverdale: Special Episode – Hedwig and the Angry Inch the Musical (Original Television Soundtrack)
"Wicked Little Town (Reprise)" (with KJ Apa)	2020	Riverdale: Special Episode – Hedwig and the Angry Inch the Musical (Original Television Soundtrack)
"Midnight Radio" (with Riverdale cast)	2020	Riverdale: Special Episode – Hedwig and the Angry Inch the Musical (Original Television Soundtrack)
"Just Another Day" (with Mädchen Amick, Jacquie Lee, Tyson Ritter)	2021	Riverdale: Special Episode – Next to Normal the Musical (Original Television Soundtrack)
"I Miss the Mountains" (with Mädchen Amick)	2021	Riverdale: Special Episode – Next to Normal the Musical (Original Television Soundtrack)
"Everything Else" (with Mädchen Amick, Jacquie Lee)	2021	Riverdale: Special Episode – Next to Normal the Musical (Original Television Soundtrack)
"It's Gonna Be Good" (with Mädchen Amick, Jacquie Lee, Tyson Ritter)	2021	Riverdale: Special Episode – Next to Normal the Musical (Original Television Soundtrack)
"She's Not Here"	2021	Riverdale: Special Episode – Next to Normal the Musical (Original Television Soundtrack)
"I Am the One" (with Jacquie Lee, Tyson Ritter)	2021	Riverdale: Special Episode – Next to Normal the Musical (Original Television Soundtrack)
"I've Been" (with Casey Cott)	2021	Riverdale: Special Episode – Next to Normal the Musical (Original Television Soundtrack)
"Make Up Your Mind / Catch Me I'm Falling" (with Camila Mendes, Vanessa Morgan, Casey Cott)	2021	Riverdale: Special Episode – Next to Normal the Musical (Original Television Soundtrack)
"A Promise"	2021	Riverdale: Special Episode – Next to Normal the Musical (Original Television Soundtrack)
"Maybe (Next to Normal)" (with Mädchen Amick)	2021	Riverdale: Special Episode – Next to Normal the Musical (Original Television Soundtrack)
"Light" (with KJ Apa, Camila Mendes, Mädchen Amick, Casey Cott, Vanessa Morgan, Madelaine Petsch, Drew Ray Tanner, Erinn Westbrook, Ryan Robbins, Kyra Leroux)	2021	Riverdale: Special Episode – Next to Normal the Musical (Original Television Soundtrack)
"Walking in Space" (with Erinn Westbrook, Madelaine Petsch, Nathalie Boltt)	2021	Riverdale: Season 5 (Original Television Soundtrack)
"Nothin' But a Good Time" (with Camila Mendes, Erinn Westbrook, Madelaine Petsch, Mädchen Amick)	2021	Riverdale: Season 5 (Original Television Soundtrack)
"You Are What You Wear" (with Vanessa Morgan, Erinn Westbrook, Camila Mendes, Madelaine Petsch, Caroline Day, Sophia Tatum)	2022	Riverdale: Special Episode: American Psycho the Musical (Original Television Soundtrack) - EP
"A Girl Before"	2022	Riverdale: Special Episode: American Psycho the Musical (Original Television Soundtrack) - EP
"The End of the World" (with KJ Apa, Camila Mendes, Madelaine Petsch, Vanessa Morgan, Casey Cott, Drew Ray Tanner, Erinn Westbrook, Caroline Day)	2022	Riverdale: Season 6 (Original Television Soundtrack)

== Awards and nominations ==
Year	Award	Category	Nominated work	Result	Ref.
2017	Teen Choice Awards	Choice Breakout TV Star	Riverdale	Won	
2017	Teen Choice Awards	Choice TV Ship (with Cole Sprouse)	Riverdale	Won	
2018	Saturn Awards	Best Performance by a Younger Actor in a Television Series	Riverdale	Nominated	
2018	Teen Choice Awards	Choice Drama TV Actress	Riverdale	Won	
2018	Teen Choice Awards	Choice Liplock (with Cole Sprouse)	Riverdale	Won	
2018	Teen Choice Awards	Choice TV Ship (with Cole Sprouse)	Riverdale	Won	
2018	Variety + H&M Conscious Award	Conscious Award	—	Won	
2019	People's Choice Awards	Drama TV Star of 2019	Riverdale	Nominated	
2019	People's Choice Awards	Female TV Star of 2019	Riverdale	Nominated	
2019	Teen Choice Awards	Choice Drama TV Actress	Riverdale	Won	
2019	Teen Choice Awards	Choice Ship (with Cole Sprouse)	Riverdale	Won	
2020	People's Choice Awards	Female TV Star of 2020	Riverdale	Nominated	
2021	Critics' Choice Super Awards	Best Actress in a Superhero Series	Riverdale	Nominated	

== Publications ==
- Swimming Lessons: Poems (September 29, 2020)
- September Love (November 3, 2020) (co-written with Lang Leav)
