= Her Smell =

2018 film directed by Alex Ross Perry

- Theatrical release poster
- Directed by: Alex Ross Perry
- Written by: Alex Ross Perry
- Produced by: Elisabeth Moss; Matthew Perniciaro; Alex Ross Perry; Adam Piotrowicz; Michael Sherman
- Starring: Elisabeth Moss; Cara Delevingne; Dan Stevens; Agyness Deyn; Gayle Rankin; Ashley Benson; Amber Heard; Dylan Gelula; Suyash Pachauri; Eka Darville; Lindsay Burdge
- Cinematography: Sean Price Williams
- Edited by: Robert Greene
- Music by: Keegan DeWitt; Alicia Bognanno
- Production companies: Bow and Arrow Entertainment; Faliro House Productions
- Distributed by: Gunpowder & Sky
- Release dates: September 9, 2018 (TIFF); April 12, 2019 (United States)
- Running time: 135 minutes
- Country: United States
- Language: English
- Box office: $260,481

Her Smell is a 2018 American drama film written, co-produced and directed by Alex Ross Perry. It stars Elisabeth Moss, Cara Delevingne, Dan Stevens, Agyness Deyn, Gayle Rankin, Ashley Benson, Amber Heard, Dylan Gelula, Eka Darville and Lindsay Burdge and follows Moss as fictional rock star Becky Something, whose band experiences brief fame but is broken up by her self-destructive behavior.

Her Smell had its world premiere at the Toronto International Film Festival on September 9, 2018, and had its general release on April 12, 2019, by Gunpowder & Sky. The film received generally positive reviews from critics, who particularly praised Moss's acting.

== Plot ==
The film is told with five distinct scenes punctuated with some home movie footage from early in the band's career when they were successful—appearing on magazine covers, attending photo shoots, and receiving gold records.

In the first scene, punk rock group, Something She, wraps up a show and lead vocalist, Becky Something, goes backstage to attend a brief ceremony with her personal shaman. Her mood swings violently from happy to aggressive as her bandmates, ex-husband, manager, and a former musical collaborator all try to steer her toward positive choices: recording their next album, playing future shows, and finding stability for her child. The scene ends as she turns a corner with her infant in her hands and falls over inebriated, vomiting on herself.

In the second vignette, Something She is in the studio several months later, aimlessly trying to record the band's next album. Drummer Ali van der Wolff becomes frustrated and quits, followed by bassist Marielle Hell, leaving their manager Howard Goodman distraught as he tries to clear the space for his new band Akergirls to record. Becky refuses to leave and butts in on their session.

The third scene is set after Akergirls have become famous and Becky is opening their show, with Ali back to support her. She shows up two hours late with a film crew in tow, berating her ex-husband, Danny, and her mother, Ania, who are the last persons in her life still willing to put up with her selfishness. When Ania gives her some papers from her estranged father, Becky becomes violently upset and hurls verbal abuse at her mother and assaults Ali before rushing onstage and collapsing into another stupor.

Several years later, Becky is sober and her daughter Tama, now a young girl, is coming to visit. As Dan drops her off, he gives his ex some paperwork for some of the many lawsuits facing Becky and tells her that Mari has also come with them. Becky has brief tender moments with all three, but her thinking appears disordered: she believes that leaving her house will kill her and that her love for her daughter will destroy her; she also recounts a dream from a past life that she thinks justifies her cruelty and selfishness toward her ex.

In the final piece, 11 years have passed since Howard first signed Something She and four years since they have performed together, but they have reunited to perform a single song at a showcase event that features all of Howard's popular musical acts. Becky appears nervous and has to rely on all of the musicians performing a seance with her before she can gather her courage to go onstage. She briefly walks away after cryptically thanking all of them for staying with her until the end. Several of her loved ones become concerned, but they find her ready to take the stage and she performs one song with her bandmates and fellow musicians all collaborating. It is successful and they step backstage where Howard tells her the crowd wants more and asks if she has another one in her. Becky says that she is done, embracing Tama and smelling her hair.

== Cast ==
- Elisabeth Moss as Becky Something (née Rebecca Adamcyzk), lead singer and guitarist of Something She
- Cara Delevingne as Crassie Cassie, a member of Akergirls
- Dan Stevens as Danny, Becky's ex-husband
- Agyness Deyn as Marielle Hell, bassist for Something She
- Gayle Rankin as Ali van der Wolff, drummer for Something She
- Ashley Benson as Roxie Rotten, a member of Akergirls
- Dylan Gelula as Dottie O.Z., a member of Akergirls
- Eka Darville as Ya-ema, Becky's shaman and later convict
- Lindsay Burdge as Lauren, Mari's love interest
- Hannah Gross as Tiffany, Dan's second wife
- Virginia Madsen as Ania Adamcyzk, Becky's mother
- Eric Stoltz as Howard Goodman, manager for all of the musicians
- Amber Heard as Zelda E. Zekiel, a musician who was a mentor of Something whom she later spited
- Daisy Pugh-Weiss as Tama, Becky and Dan's daughter
- Keith Poulson as Roy, Ali's husband
- Alexis Krauss as Vivvy, a musician backstage at the reunion show
- Craig Butta as Greg, a studio engineer

== Production ==
In January 2018, it was announced Elisabeth Moss would star in the film, with Alex Ross Perry directing from a screenplay he wrote. Perry and Moss also served as producers on the film, alongside Matthew Perniciaro, Michael Sherman, and Adam Piotrowicz under their Bow and Arrow Entertainment banner. In April 2018, Agyness Deyn, Gayle Rankin and Amber Heard joined the cast of the film. In May 2018, it was announced that Ashley Benson, Cara Delevingne, Dan Stevens, Eric Stoltz, Virginia Madsen and Dylan Gelula joined the cast of the film. Keegan DeWitt composed the film's score.

Principal photography began on April 23, 2018, in New York City. Production concluded on May 18, 2018.

Moss called the performance her most physically challenging in a 2020 interview for Bullseye with Jesse Thorn.

== Release ==
The film had its world premiere at the Toronto International Film Festival on September 9, 2018. It also screened at the New York Film Festival on September 29, 2018. Shortly after, Gunpowder & Sky acquired U.S. distribution rights to the film. It also screened at AFI Fest on November 10, 2018. and was screened at South by Southwest in March 2019. It was released on April 12, 2019.

== Reception ==
On review aggregator website Rotten Tomatoes, the film holds an approval rating of 83% based on 138 reviews, and an average rating of 7.3/10. The site's critical consensus reads: "Held together by a gripping lead performance from Elisabeth Moss, Her Smell is challenging and admittedly uneven, but ultimately worth the effort." On Metacritic, the film holds a rating of 70 out of 100, based on 24 critics, indicating "generally favorable" reviews. A. A. Dowd of The A.V. Club gave the film a B+, praising Moss's performance in particular and the film's attempt to de-glamorize the rock and roll lifestyle. The publication later placed it fifty-fifth in their 100 best films of the decade and sixth-best of 2019.

On 27 November 2019, Perry wrote an open letter that premiered on IndieWire urging the Academy of Motion Picture Arts and Sciences to consider Moss for the Academy Award for Best Actress at their 2020 ceremony.

== Soundtrack ==
The film's original rock music was written by Bully's Alicia Bognanno and Anika Pyle along with her bandmates from the band Katie Ellen, with the score composed by Keegan DeWitt. A promotional music video for "Can't Wait" by Akergirls was released and a 3 vinyl LP of the music was released by Waxwork Records.
