= Dylan Gelula =

American actress (born 1994)

- Born: Dylan Nicole Gelula; May 7, 1994 (age 32); Philadelphia, Pennsylvania, U.S.
- Occupation: Actress
- Years active: 2006–present
- Partner: Devon Bostick (2022–present)

Dylan Nicole Gelula (born May 7, 1994) is an American actress who is best known for her role of Xanthippe on Unbreakable Kimmy Schmidt, as well as for her work in independent films. Gelula made her film debut as the lead actress in romantic drama film First Girl I Loved (2016) and has since acted in the films Flower (2017), Support the Girls (2018), Her Smell (2018), Shithouse (2020), Dream Scenario (2023), and Smile 2 (2024).

== Early life ==
Gelula was born on May 7, 1994, in Philadelphia, Pennsylvania. Her father is an Ashkenazi Jew, and she was raised in Reform Judaism. She attended Lower Merion High School and recalls having a difficult time in high school, having been "very lonely, but very comfortable being alone," and showed up to school so infrequently that she was forced to either repeat her senior year or drop out. She ended up dropping out and moving to Los Angeles by herself at the age of seventeen.

== Career ==
Gelula began her acting career at the age of ten as an extra in the M. Night Shyamalan film Lady in the Water, which she later revealed neither she nor her parents ever viewed. Two years later, in the sixth grade, she found a manager. Before moving to Los Angeles, her agent in New York got her an audition for the role of Jean Fordham in an Arden Theatre Company production of August: Osage County, directed by Terry Nolen, which she ended up starring in. She recalls remembering originally trying to turn down the part, but later realizing that she was very interested in it.

After moving to Los Angeles at the age of 17, she worked as a waitress at a high-end restaurant in Santa Monica, from which she was quickly fired. She also worked as a buyer at Wasteland, a resale store. She has had guest roles on NCIS: Naval Criminal Investigative Service, Are We There Yet?, and Law and Order: Special Victims Unit. Gelula has also played Gretchen Doyle on Jennifer Falls, Ford on Chasing Life, and Xanthippe on Unbreakable Kimmy Schmidt.

When Gelula initially auditioned for the role of Xanthippe on Unbreakable Kimmy Schmidt, she was in Los Angeles, but casting was only happening in New York City. She gave the crew of the show an audition tape, and received a call one month later that they were interested in her for the part. The crew asked her to do a table read with the cast before she was given the part, and she eventually received the role. She claims she does not know why the character of Xanthippe was given the name she was given.

In 2016, Gelula made her film debut as the lead actress with romantic drama film First Girl I Loved, directed by Kerem Sanga. The film premiered at the 2016 Sundance Film Festival and won the audience award for Best Of NEXT. Gelula's performance in the film as Anne received rave reviews from various critics. That same year she had recurring roles in shows such as the teen sitcom Filthy Preppy Teens and Hulu's comedy-drama Casual. She continued to appear in numerous independent films including Flower (2017), Support the Girls (2018), and Her Smell (2018).

In 2020, Dylan created a podcast with Broti Gupta called Lecture Hall, with guests including Ayo Edebiri and Rachel Sennott. She acted in Cooper Raiff's directorial film debut Shithouse (2020) where she played the romantic lead opposite Raiff. The film won the Grand Jury Prize for Best Narrative Feature at the SXSW Festival. In 2023 she had a supporting role as Molly, a talent agent's assistant, in Kristoffer Borgli's psychological dark comedy Dream Scenario starring Nicolas Cage.

== Filmography ==
=== Film ===
Year	Title	Role	Notes
2006	Lady in the Water	Girl in pool	Uncredited extra
2016	First Girl I Loved	Anne	
2017	Flower	Kala	
2018	Support the Girls	Jennelle	
2018	Under the Eiffel Tower	Rosalind	
2018	Her Smell	Dottie O.Z.	
2020	Horse Girl	Jane Doe	
2020	Shithouse	Maggie	
2022	I Want You Back	Lisa	
2023	Dream Scenario	Molly	
2023	Helen's Dead	Addie	
2024	Smile 2	Gemma	

=== Television ===
Year	Title	Role	Notes
2011	Law & Order: Special Victims Unit	Becca	Episode: "Totem"
2011	Are We There Yet?	Amy	Episode: "The Lindsay Gets High Episode"
2013	NCIS	Young Marie Markin	Episode: "Once a Crook"
2014	Jennifer Falls	Gretchen Doyle	Main cast
2014–2015	Chasing Life	Ford	Recurring role
2015–2020	Unbreakable Kimmy Schmidt	Xanthippe Lannister Voorhees	Recurring role
2016	Filthy Preppy Teens	Parker	Main cast
2016	Casual	Aubrey	Recurring role
2019–2020	Shameless	Megan	Recurring role (season 10)
2020	A Teacher	Hook-Up Girl	Episode: "Episode 7"
2022	Loot	Hailey	3 episodes
2024	Hacks	Mirya	3 episodes
2024	Krapopolis	Sophie (voice)	Episode: "Ty's Man Woman Table Chairs Food"

=== Music videos ===
Year	Title	Artist	Ref.
2019	"Can't Wait"	The Akergirls	
2025	"Bunky Pop"	Sleigh Bells	

== Awards and nominations ==
Year	Association	Category	Project	Result	Ref.
2016	Sarasota Film Festival	Independent Visions Award	First Girl I Loved	Won	
2016	Santo Domingo Outfest	Jury Prize for Outstanding Performance	First Girl I Loved	Won	
