= Gayle Rankin =

Scottish actress

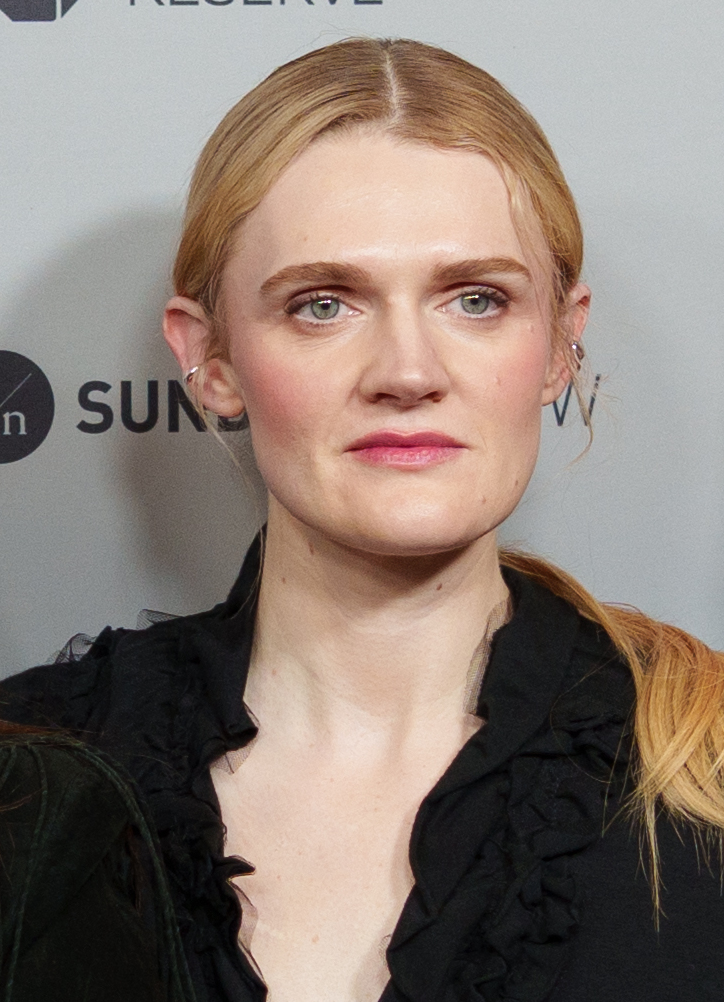
- Rankin at the Sundance Film Festival in 2026
- Born: 1989-90; Paisley, Scotland
- Education: Juilliard School (BFA)
- Occupation: Actress
- Years active: 2012–present

Gayle Rankin is a Scottish actress. She is known for her role as Sheila in the Netflix series GLOW (2017–2019). She also played Emily Dodson in the HBO series Perry Mason (2020). Her films include The Greatest Showman (2017), Her Smell (2018), Blow the Man Down, and The Climb (both 2019).

Rankin joined the cast of the HBO series House of the Dragon for its second season as Alys Rivers. In 2024, she was nominated for the Tony Award for Best Actress in a Musical at the 77th Tony Awards for her role in Cabaret.

== Early life ==
Gayle Rankin was born in Paisley and grew up in Eaglesham and Kilmaurs. She has an older sister. She attended Mearns Castle High School and completed sixth form at Knightswood Secondary School's Dance School of Scotland. At 17, Rankin won a scholarship to train at the Juilliard School in New York City and became the institution's first Scottish student. She was also awarded an international fellowship to study in Sydney, Australia.

== Career ==
In 2012, Rankin made her acting debut in a season 13 episode of Law & Order: Special Victims Unit. In 2017, Rankin began appearing on the series GLOW, as Sheila the She-Wolf. It premiered on 23 June 2017 on Netflix. The show was renewed for a third season which premiered on 9 August 2019.

In 2017, Rankin appeared in the film The Meyerowitz Stories, directed by Noah Baumbach. The film premiered at the 2017 Cannes Film Festival, and was released by Netflix on 13 October 2017. That same year, she appeared in The Greatest Showman as Queen Victoria, supporting Hugh Jackman and Michelle Williams.

In 2018, Rankin appeared in Irreplaceable You, directed by Stephanie Laing, opposite Gugu Mbatha-Raw and Michiel Huisman. It was released by Netflix on 16 February 2018. That same year, she appeared in In a Relationship directed by Sam Boyd, which had its world premiere at the Tribeca Film Festival on 20 April 2018, and in Her Smell, directed by Alex Ross Perry, opposite Elisabeth Moss and Agyness Deyn.

In 2020, she was cast as Emily Dodson, the mother of Charlie Dodson, a 1-year-old child who is mysteriously kidnapped in the series Perry Mason.

In April 2023, it was announced that Rankin had been cast as Alys Rivers in the second season of House of the Dragon.

On Broadway, she has starred in the 2014 revival of Cabaret as Fräulein Kost. She starred as Sally Bowles in the 2024 revival opposite Eddie Redmayne, earning acclaim and a nomination for the Tony Award for Best Actress in a Musical at the 77th Tony Awards.

== Theatre ==
Year	Title	Role	Company	Director	Details
2012	Tribes	Ruth		David Cromer	play by Nina Raine, Barrow Street Theatre, Greenwich Village
2014	Cabaret	Fräulein Kost	Roundabout Theatre Company	Todd Haimes	musical by John Kander and Fred Ebb, Studio 54, Manhattan
2015	The Mystery of Love and Sex	Charlotte	Newhouse Theater	Sam Gold	play by Bathsheba Doran, Lincoln Center Theater, Manhattan
2016	The Taming of the Shrew	Bianca Minola	Public Theater	Phyllida Lloyd	comedy by William Shakespeare, Delacorte Theatre, Manhattan
2017	Hamlet	Ophelia/Second Gravedigger	Public Works	Sam Gold	play by William Shakespeare, The Public Theater, Manhattan
2024	Cabaret at the Kit Kat Club	Sally Bowles	ATG Productions	Rebecca Frecknall	August Wilson Theatre, New York
2026	The Prime of Miss Jean Brodie	Jean Brodie	National Theatre of Scotland	Vicky Featherstone	adaptation of the Muriel Spark novel by David Harrower, Scottish theatres, October - December

== Filmography ==
=== Film ===
Year	Title	Role	Notes
2012	Warfield	Molly	
2013	Frank the Bastard	Mary	
2013	It Goes Quiet	Joanie	Short film
2014	The Meeting	Sarah	Short film
2015	Girl Wakes Up	Jane	Short film
2015	Buzzer	Suzy	Short film
2016	The Passing Season	Tess	
2017	The Meyerowitz Stories	Pam	
2017	The Greatest Showman	Queen Victoria	
2018	Irreplaceable You	Mira	
2018	In a Relationship	Rachel Flegelman	
2018	Her Smell	Ali van der Wolff	
2018	Health to the King	Mary Anne	Short film
2019	Blow the Man Down	Alexis	
2019	The Climb	Marissa	
2019	Jane	Jane	Short film
2020	Worth	Maya	
2022	Men	Riley	
2023	Bad Things	Ruthie	
2026	The Incomer	Isla	
2026	The Fall of Sir Douglas Weatherford	TBA	
TBA	Ashley Wright †	Ashley Wright	Post-production

=== Television ===
Year	Title	Role	Notes
2012	Law & Order: Special Victims Unit	Holly Schneider	Episode: "Theater Tricks"
2012	My America	Gayle	Episode: "The Tal Pidae Lehstücke"
2013	The Missionary	Molly Elbridge	Television pilot
2017–19	GLOW	Sheila the She-Wolf	27 episodes
2020	Perry Mason	Emily Dodson	Season 1
2022	Kindred	Margaret Weylan	Season 1
2024–present	House of the Dragon	Alys Rivers	Main role; 12 episodes
2024	The Listeners	Jo	4 episodes

== Awards and nominations ==
Year	Award	Category	Work	Result	Ref.
2018	Actor Awards	Outstanding Performance by an Ensemble in a Comedy Series	GLOW	Nominated	
2019	Actor Awards	Outstanding Performance by an Ensemble in a Comedy Series	GLOW	Nominated	
2024	Tony Award	Best Leading Actress in a Musical	Cabaret	Nominated	
2024	Drama Desk Award	Outstanding Lead Performance in a Musical	Cabaret	Nominated	
2024	Drama League Award	Distinguished Performance	Cabaret	Nominated	
