= List of songs recorded by Labrinth =

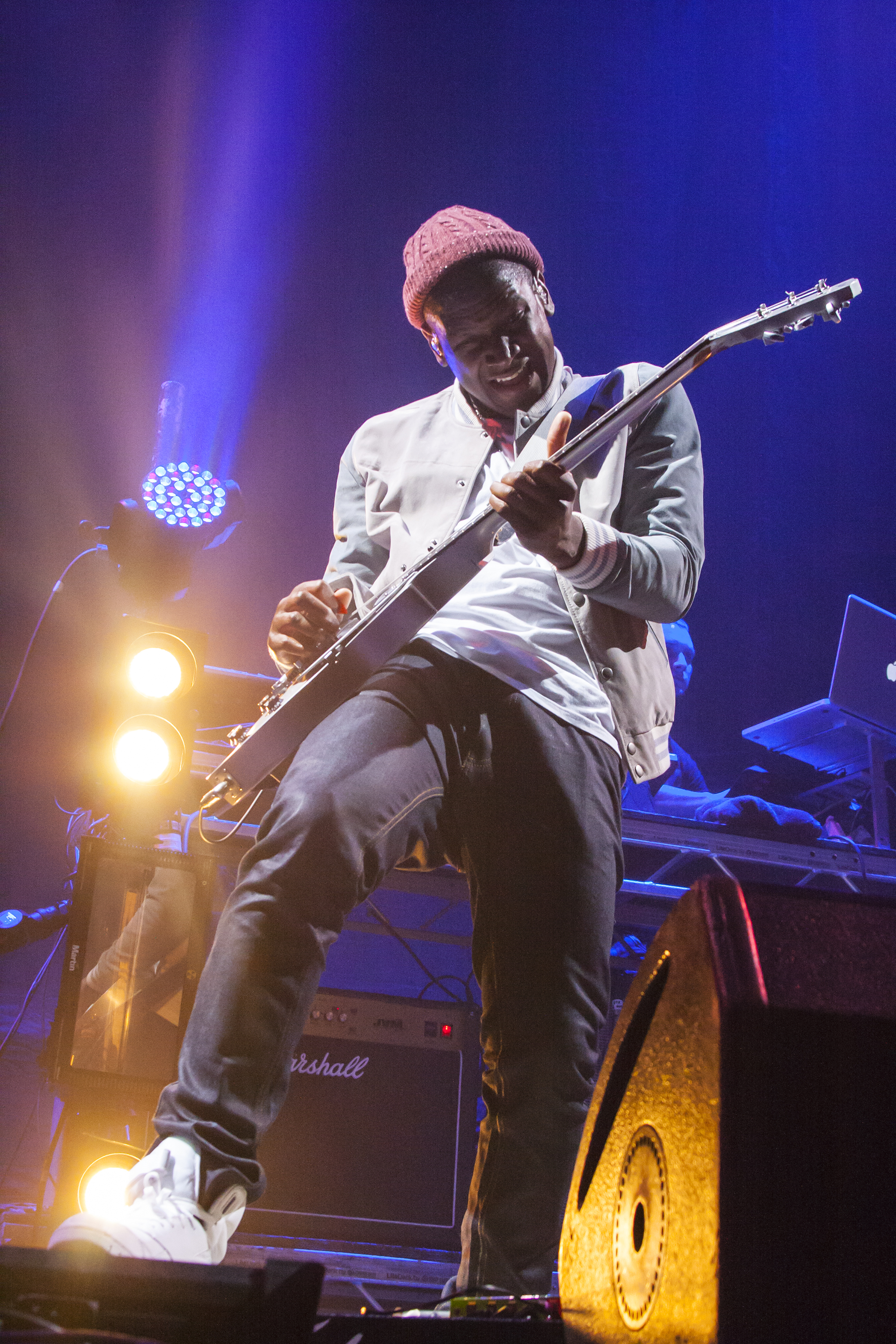
Labrinth performing in Manchester in 2013.

Labrinth (real name Timothy McKenzie) is an English recording artist and record producer from London. After producing Master Shortie's A.D.H.D. in 2009 (on which he also performed all instruments), Labrinth came to prominence in 2010 for his work on Tinie Tempah's debut album, Disc-Overy, for which he produced the singles "Pass Out", "Frisky" (on both of which he also performed) and "Wonderman". During the same year, he also appeared on tracks by Professor Green ("Oh My God", from Alive Till I'm Dead) and Devlin ("Let It Go", from Bud, Sweat and Beers). He released his first single in September, "Let the Sun Shine", which reached number three on the UK Singles Chart. Whilst continuing to record his debut album, Labrinth also performed on and co-produced the charity single "Teardrop" for Children in Need 2011, along with a range of artists including Tulisa and Rizzle Kicks.

In March 2012, Labrinth released his debut album Electronic Earth. Written and produced largely by Labrinth and his manager Marc "Da Digglar" Williams, the album also features songwriting credits for Rami Yacoub, Carl Falk, Mike Posner, and more. Following the success of "Let the Sun Shine", and second and third singles "Earthquake" and "Last Time", three more singles were released from the album: "Express Yourself", "Treatment" and "Beneath Your Beautiful" with Emeli Sandé, which was Labrinth's first single to top the UK Singles Chart. Deluxe versions of the album featured bonus tracks with contributions from Wretch 32, Busta Rhymes, Tinchy Stryder, and more.

Later in the year, Labrinth featured on the Plan B single "Playing with Fire", from the album ill Manors, and also released an extended play (EP) of previously unreleased tracks, Atomic, which featured a wide range of artists including Ed Sheeran and Wretch 32. Labrinth reunited with Tinie Tempah in 2013, featuring on the tracks "It's OK" and "Lover Not a Fighter" on his second album Demonstration, the latter of which was released as a single the following year and reached number 16 in the UK. 2014 also featured the first releases from Labrinth's upcoming second album: "Let It Be" was released in September and reached number 11 in the UK, and "Jealous" followed in November and peaked at number seven. Labrinth also collaborated with Sigma on the single "Higher", which was released in March 2015.

== Songs ==
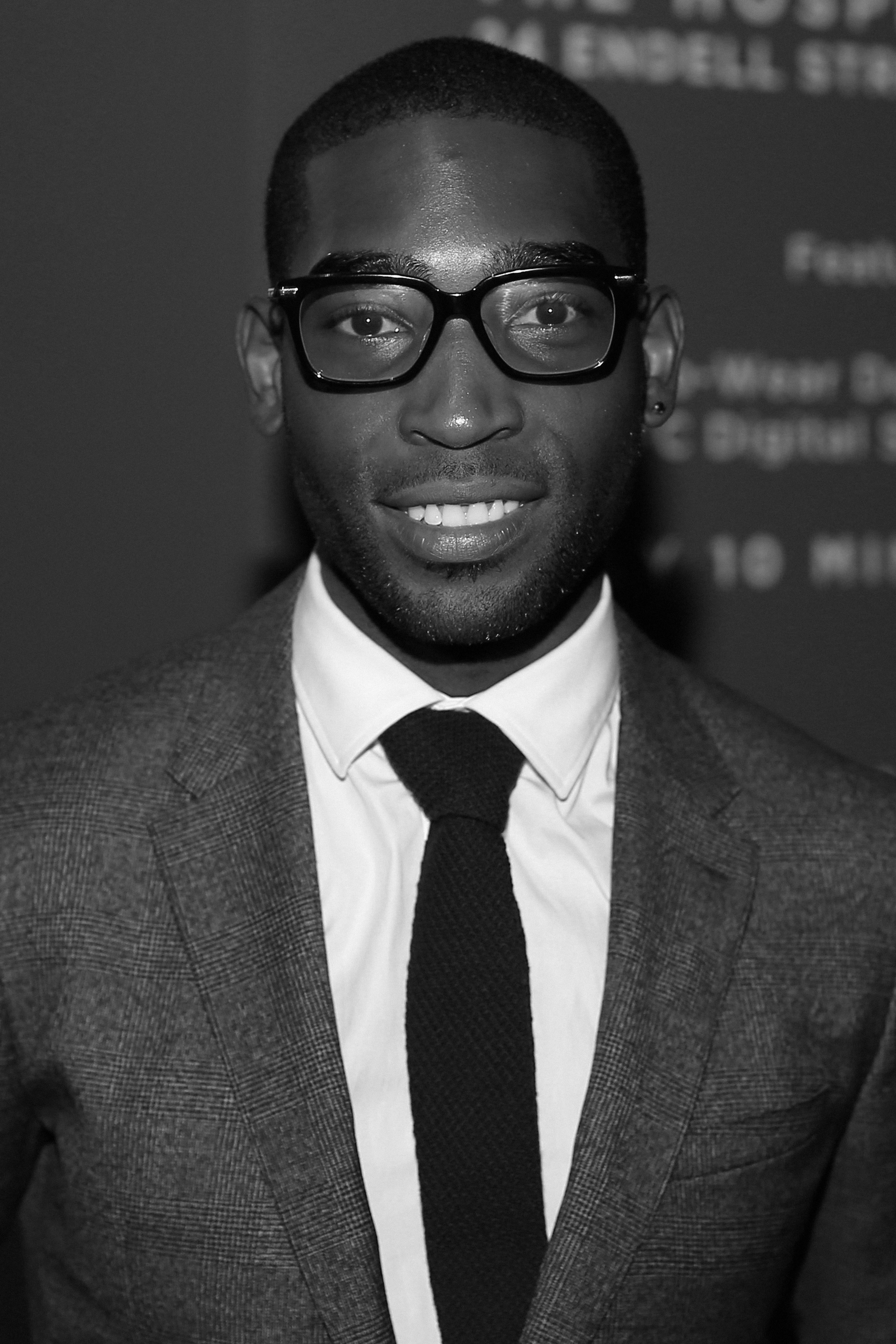
Labrinth has worked with Tinie Tempah on numerous songs since 2010, including four singles.

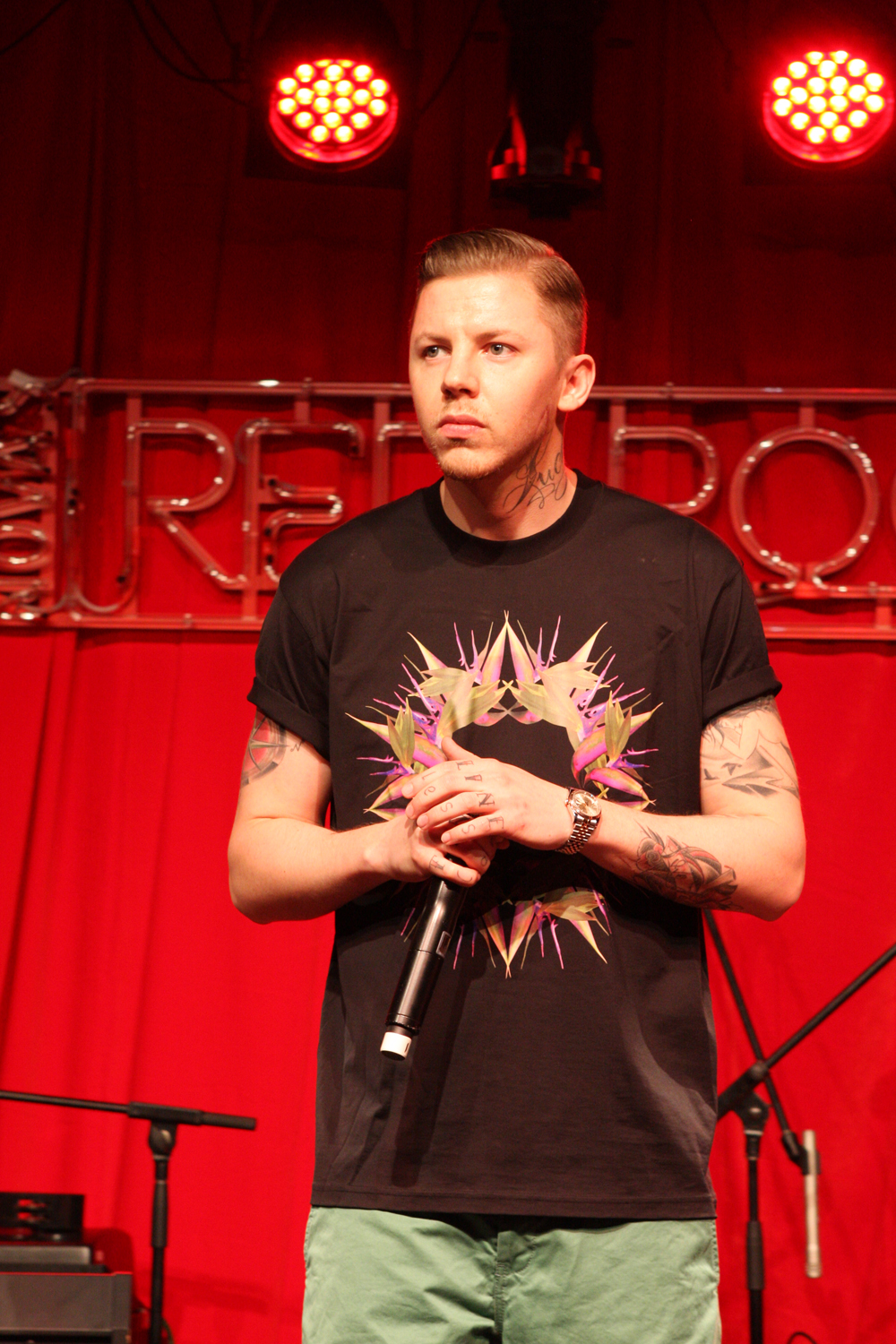
Labrinth is featured on the 2010 Professor Green track "Oh My God".

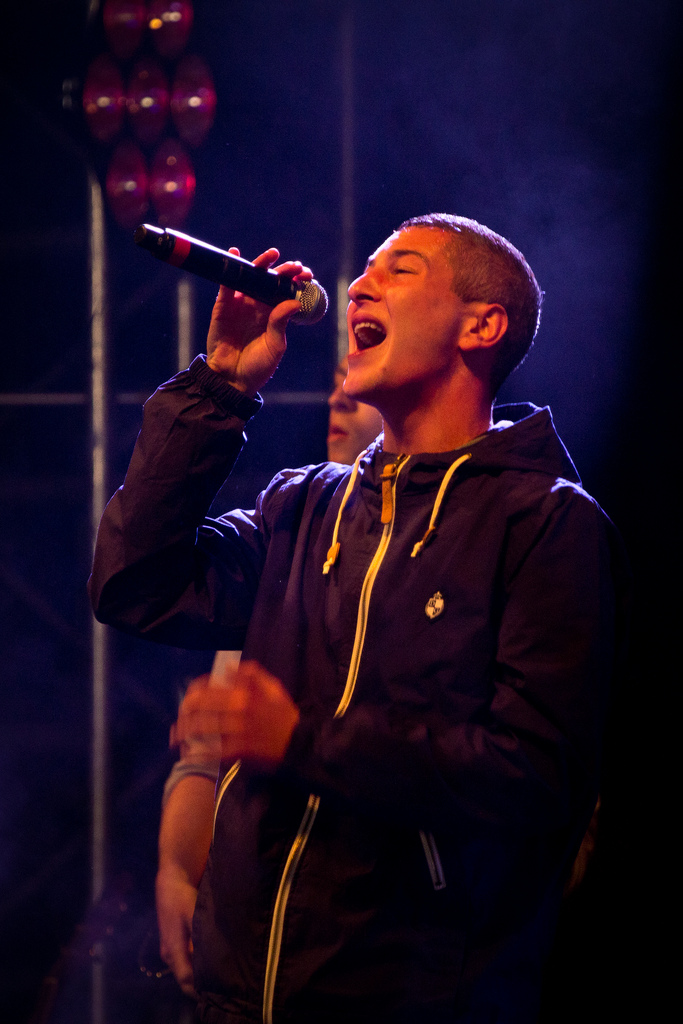
Devlin collaborated with Labrinth on "Let It Go", "Up in Flames" and "Meanest Man".

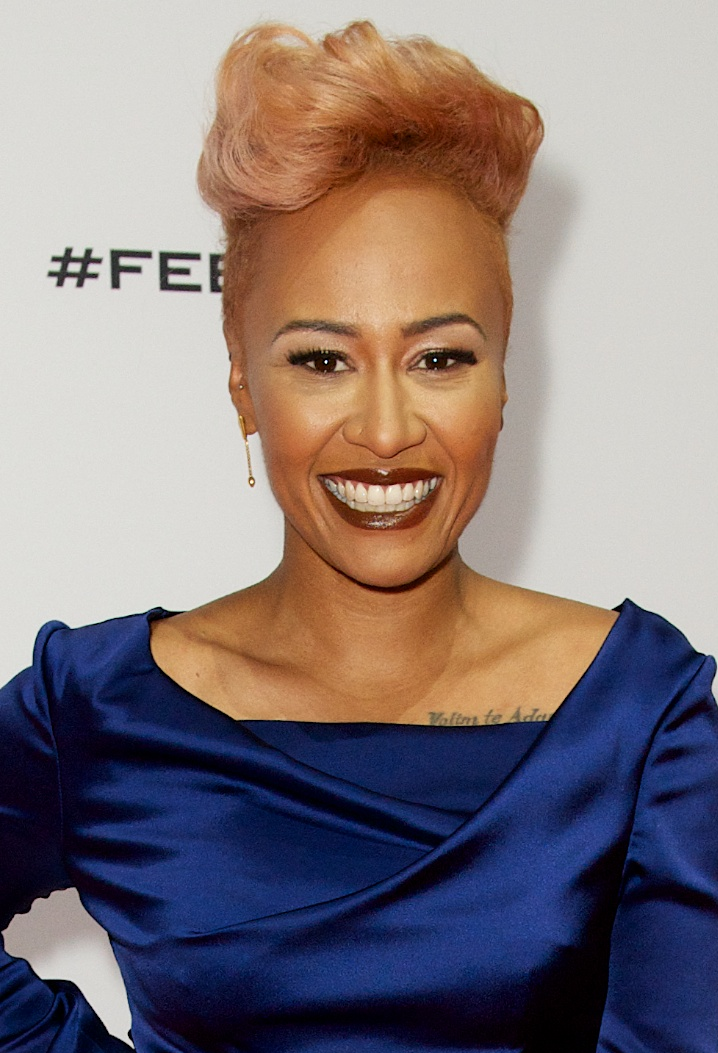
Emeli Sandé collaborated with Labrinth on "Beneath Your Beautiful".

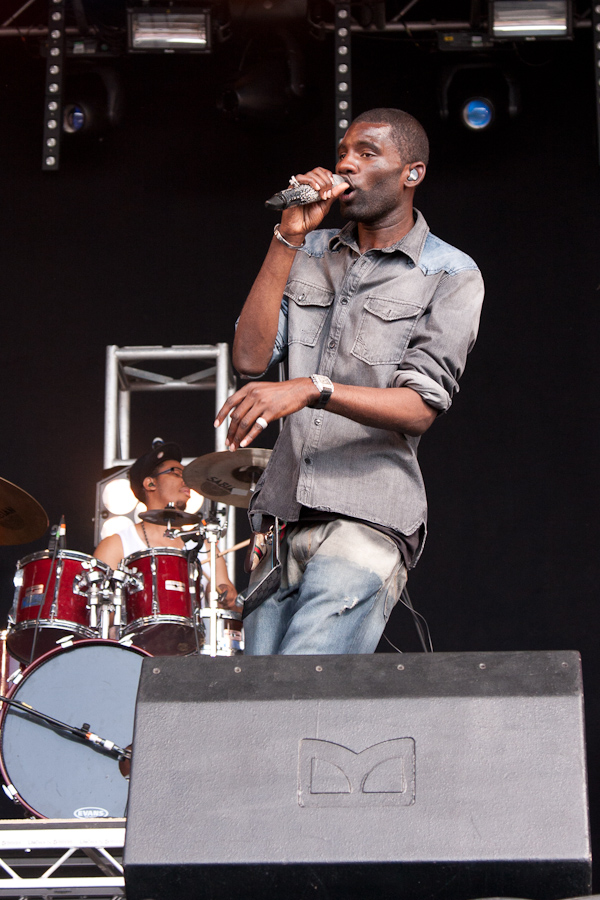
Wretch 32 features on two Labrinth songs: "Earthquake" (All Stars Remix) and "Meanest Man".

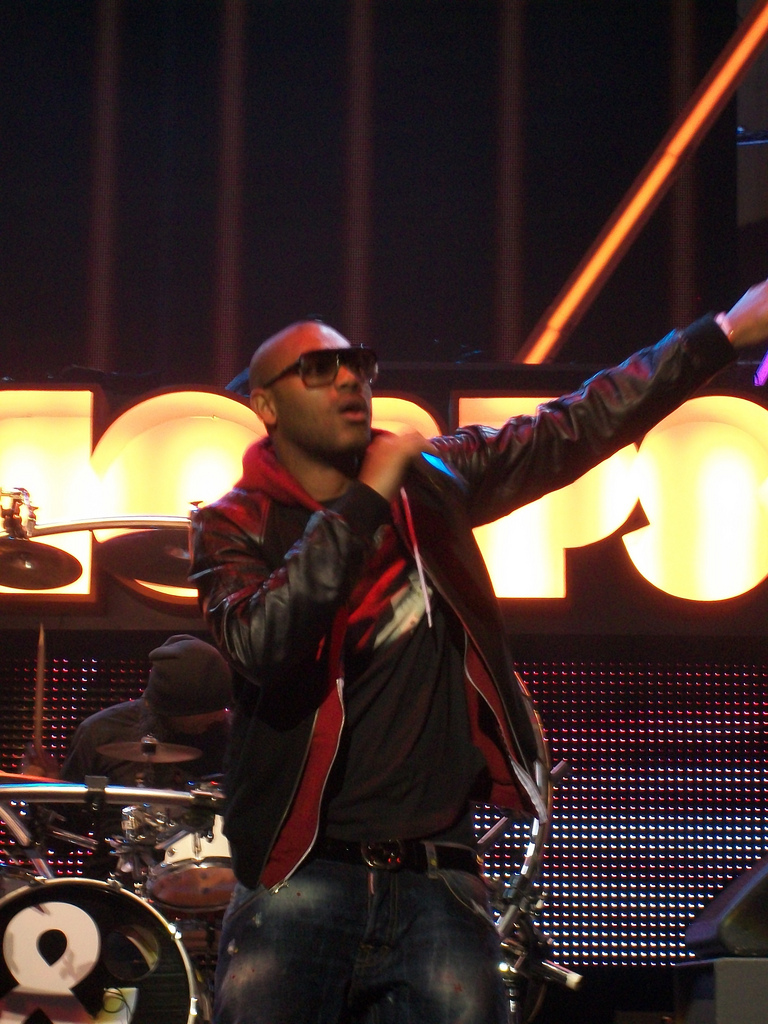
Kano is one of four rappers featured on the All Stars remix of "Earthquake".

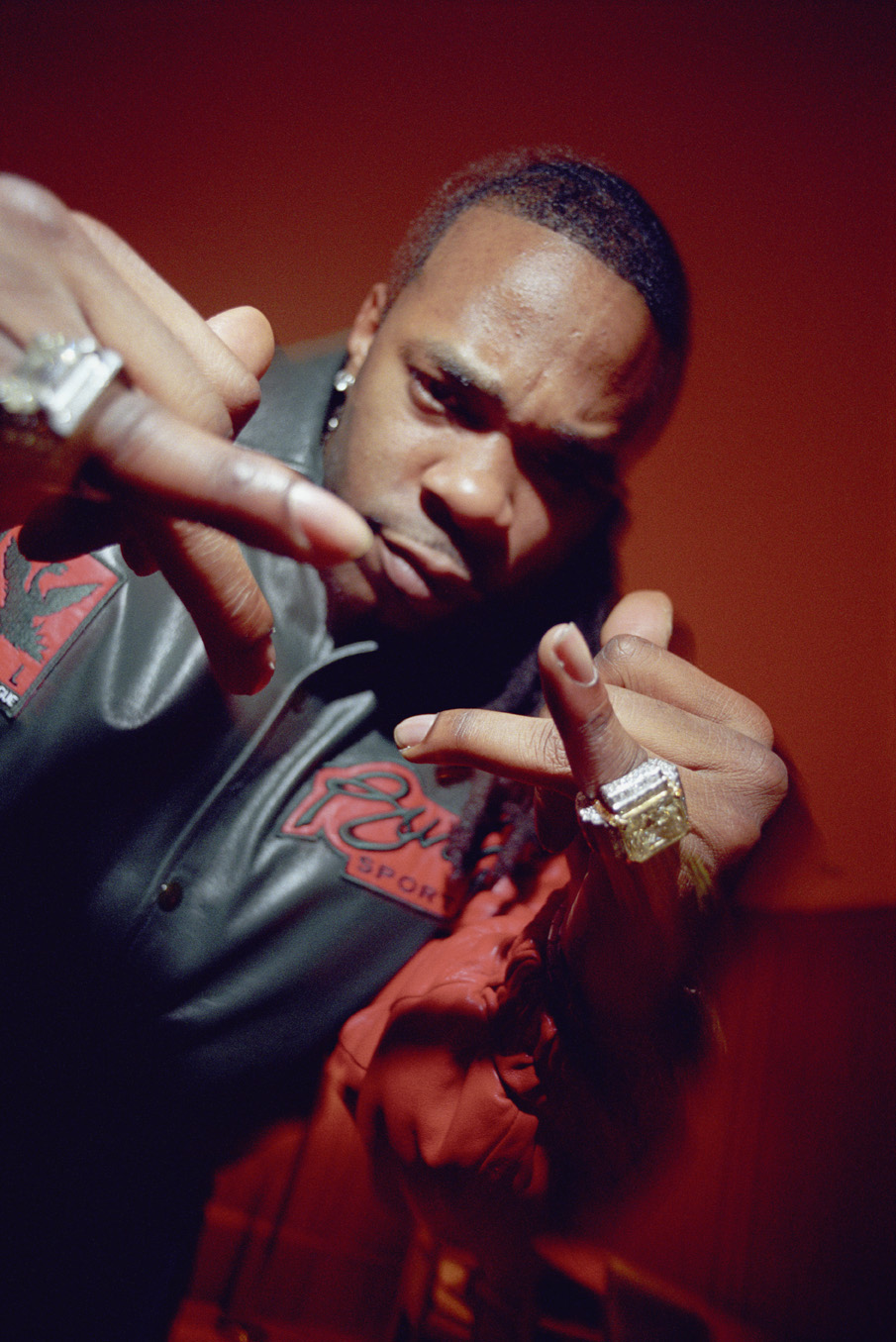
Busta Rhymes has performed with Labrinth on the "Earthquake" All Stars remix.

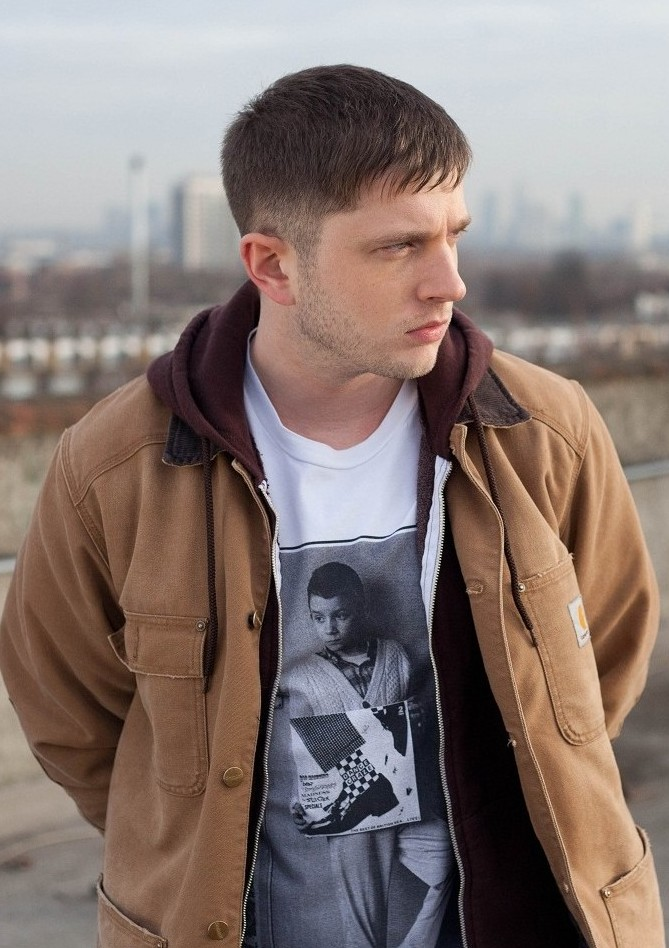
Labrinth and Plan B worked together on "Playing with Fire" and "Atomic".

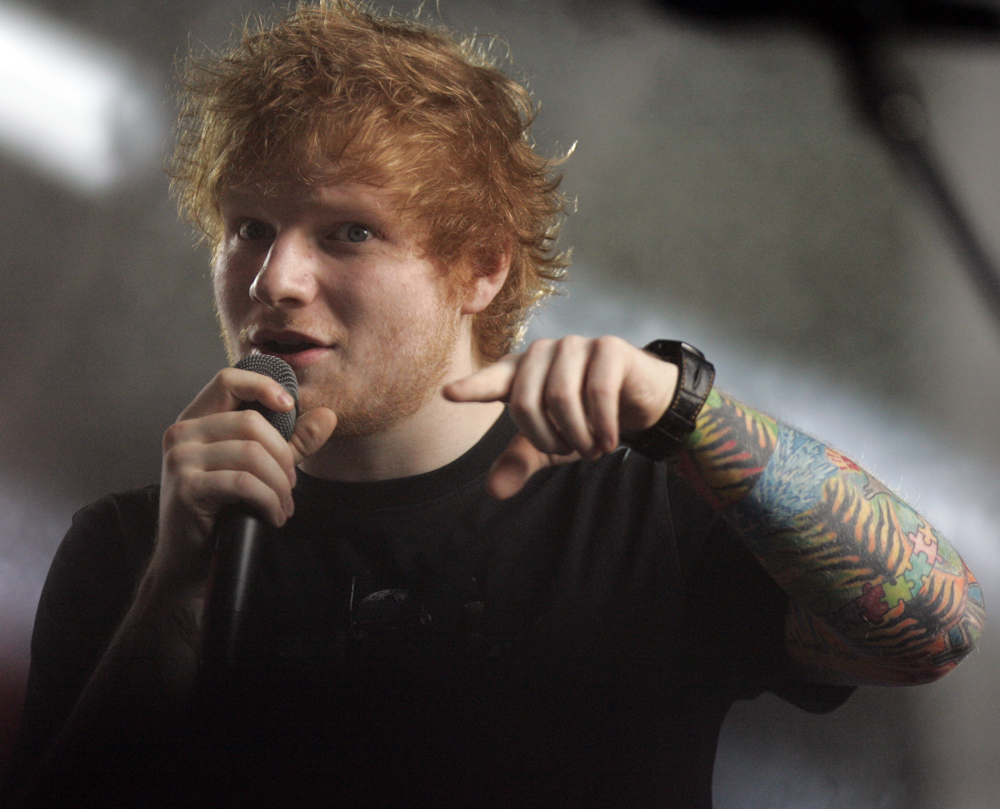
Singer-songwriter Ed Sheeran is featured on the Atomic track "Meanest Man".

Key
†	Indicates song released as a single
‡	Indicates song written solely by Labrinth

Title	Artist(s)	Writer(s)	Producer(s)	Release	Year	Ref.	Notes
"A.D.H.D. Intro"	Master Shortie	Theo Kerlin; Timothy McKenzie	Labrinth	A.D.H.D.	2009		^{[A]}
"Atomic"	Labrinth; Plan B	Timothy McKenzie; Ben Drew	Labrinth	Atomic	2013		^{[B]}
"Beneath Your Beautiful" †	Labrinth; Emeli Sandé	Timothy McKenzie; Emeli Sandé; Mike Posner	Labrinth; Da Digglar	Electronic Earth	2012		
"Bringing It Back" †	Master Shortie	Theo Kerlin; Timothy McKenzie	Labrinth	A.D.H.D.	2009		^{[A]}
"Climb on Board"	Labrinth	Timothy McKenzie; Marc Williams	Labrinth; Da Digglar	Electronic Earth	2012		
"Dance Like a White Boy"	Master Shortie	Theo Kerlin; Timothy McKenzie; Marc Williams	Labrinth	A.D.H.D.	2009		^{[A]}
"Dead End" †	Master Shortie	Theo Kerlin; Timothy McKenzie	Labrinth	A.D.H.D.	2009		^{[A]}
"Earthquake" †	Labrinth; Tinie Tempah	Timothy McKenzie; Marc Williams; Patrick Okogwu	Labrinth; Da Digglar	Electronic Earth	2012		
"Earthquake" (All Stars Remix)	Labrinth; Tinie Tempah; Kano; Wretch 32; Busta Rhymes	Timothy McKenzie; Marc Williams; Patrick Okogwu; Kane Robinson; Jermaine Sinclair; Trevor Smith	Labrinth; Da Digglar	Electronic Earth	2012		^{[C]}
"Express Yourself" †	Labrinth	Timothy McKenzie; Charles Wright	Labrinth; Da Digglar	Electronic Earth	2012		
"Frisky" †	Tinie Tempah; Labrinth	Patrick Okogwu; Timothy McKenzie; Marc Williams	Labrinth; Da Digglar	Disc-Overy	2010		
"Groupie Love"	Master Shortie	Theo Kerlin; Timothy McKenzie	Labrinth	A.D.H.D.	2009		^{[A]}
"Have It Your Way"	Master Shortie	Theo Kerlin; Timothy McKenzie; Marc Williams	Labrinth	A.D.H.D.	2009		^{[A]}
"Higher" †	Sigma; Labrinth	Tom Barnes; Ben Kohn; Peter Kelleher; Wayne Hector	Sigma; TMS	Life	2015		
"It's OK"	Tinie Tempah; Labrinth	Patrick Okogwu; Timothy McKenzie	Labrinth	Demonstration	2013		
"Jealous" †	Labrinth	Timothy McKenzie; Josh Kear; Natalie Hemby	Labrinth	Take Me to the Truth	2015		
"Last Time" †	Labrinth	Timothy McKenzie; Marc Williams	Labrinth; Da Digglar	Electronic Earth	2012		
"Let It Be" †	Labrinth	Timothy McKenzie; Gustave Rudman	Labrinth; Gustave Rudman; Mike Spencer	Take Me to the Truth	2015		
"Let It Go" †	Devlin; Labrinth	James Devlin; Timothy McKenzie; Marc Williams	Labrinth; Da Digglar	Bud, Sweat and Beers	2010		
"Let the Dogs Run Wild"	Labrinth; Lady Leshurr	Timothy McKenzie; Melesha O'Garro	Labrinth	Atomic	2013		^{[B]}
"Let the Sun Shine" †	Labrinth	Timothy McKenzie ‡	Labrinth; Da Digglar	Electronic Earth	2012		
"London Town"	Master Shortie	Theo Kerlin; Timothy McKenzie; Marc Williams	Labrinth	A.D.H.D.	2009		^{[A]}
"Lover Not a Fighter" †	Tinie Tempah; Labrinth	Patrick Okogwu; Timothy McKenzie	Labrinth	Demonstration	2013		
"Meanest Man"	Labrinth; Devlin; Wretch 32; Ed Sheeran; ShezAr	Timothy McKenzie; James Devlin; Jermaine Sinclair; Ed Sheeran	Labrinth	Atomic	2013		^{[B]}
"No Prisoners"	Labrinth; Marger; Lunar C Mr Faiz; Maxsta	Timothy McKenzie; Daniel Thomas; Jake Brook; Mr Faiz; Ian Koromah	Labrinth	Atomic	2013		^{[B]}
"Nothing to Be Scared Of (Prince Charming)"	Master Shortie	Theo Kerlin; Timothy McKenzie; Stuart Goddard; Marco Pirroni	Labrinth	A.D.H.D.	2009		^{[A]}
"Oh My God"	Professor Green; Labrinth	Stephen Manderson; Timothy McKenzie; Marc Williams	Labrinth; Da Digglar	Alive Till I'm Dead	2010		
"Pass Out" †	Tinie Tempah	Patrick Okogwu; Timothy McKenzie; Marc Williams	Labrinth; Da Digglar	Disc-Overy	2010		
"Playing with Fire" †	Plan B Labrinth	Ben Drew; Timothy McKenzie	Plan B Labrinth	ill Manors	2012		
"Right Time"	Master Shortie	Theo Kerlin; Timothy McKenzie	Labrinth	A.D.H.D.	2009		^{[A]}
"Rope Chain"	Master Shortie	Theo Kerlin; Timothy McKenzie; Michael Issac	Labrinth	A.D.H.D.	2009		^{[A]}
"Sundown"	Labrinth	Timothy McKenzie; Marc Williams; Joni Mitchell	Labrinth; Da Digglar	Electronic Earth	2012		
"Swagger Chick"	Master Shortie	Theo Kerlin; Timothy McKenzie	Labrinth	A.D.H.D.	2009		^{[A]}
"Sweet Riot"	Labrinth	Timothy McKenzie ‡	Labrinth; Da Digglar	Electronic Earth	2012		
"T.O.P."	Labrinth	Timothy McKenzie ‡	Labrinth; Da Digglar	Electronic Earth	2012		^{[C]}
"Teardrop" †	The Collective	Robert Del Naja; Grantley Marshall; Andrew Vowles; Elizabeth Fraser	Gary Barlow; Labrinth	"Teardrop"	2011		
"Treatment" †	Labrinth	Timothy McKenzie; Rami Yacoub; Carl Falk	Labrinth; Da Digglar	Electronic Earth	2012		
"Under the Knife"	Labrinth; Etta Bond	Timothy McKenzie; Etta Bond	Labrinth	Atomic	2013		^{[B]}
"Under the Moon"	Master Shortie	Theo Kerlin; Timothy McKenzie; Michael Issac	Labrinth	A.D.H.D.	2009		^{[A]}
"Up in Flames"	Labrinth; Devlin; Tinchy Stryder	Timothy McKenzie; Kwasi Danquah; James Devlin	Labrinth; Da Digglar	Electronic Earth	2012		^{[C]}
"Vultures"	Labrinth	Timothy McKenzie; Claude Kelly; Wayne Hector	Labrinth; Da Digglar	Electronic Earth	2012		
"Warning"	Tinchy Stryder	Kwasi Danquah; Timothy McKenzie	Labrinth	Catch 22	2009		
"Why"	Master Shortie	Theo Kerlin; Timothy McKenzie; Polosophy	Labrinth	A.D.H.D.	2009		^{[A]}

== Notes ==
A. ^{a} ^{b} ^{c} ^{d} ^{e} ^{f} ^{g} ^{h} ^{i} ^{j} ^{k} ^{l} ^{m} Labrinth was credited with all instruments on the whole of the album A.D.H.D..
B. ^{a} ^{b} ^{c} ^{d} ^{e} Atomic was released with no album notes, so writing credits are assumed based on the artists featured on each track.
C. ^{a} ^{b} ^{c} "Earthquake" (All Stars Remix), "T.O.P." and "Up in Flames" were featured on deluxe editions of Electronic Earth only.

== See also ==
- Labrinth discography
