= Labrinth discography =

Discography of British musician and producer Labrinth

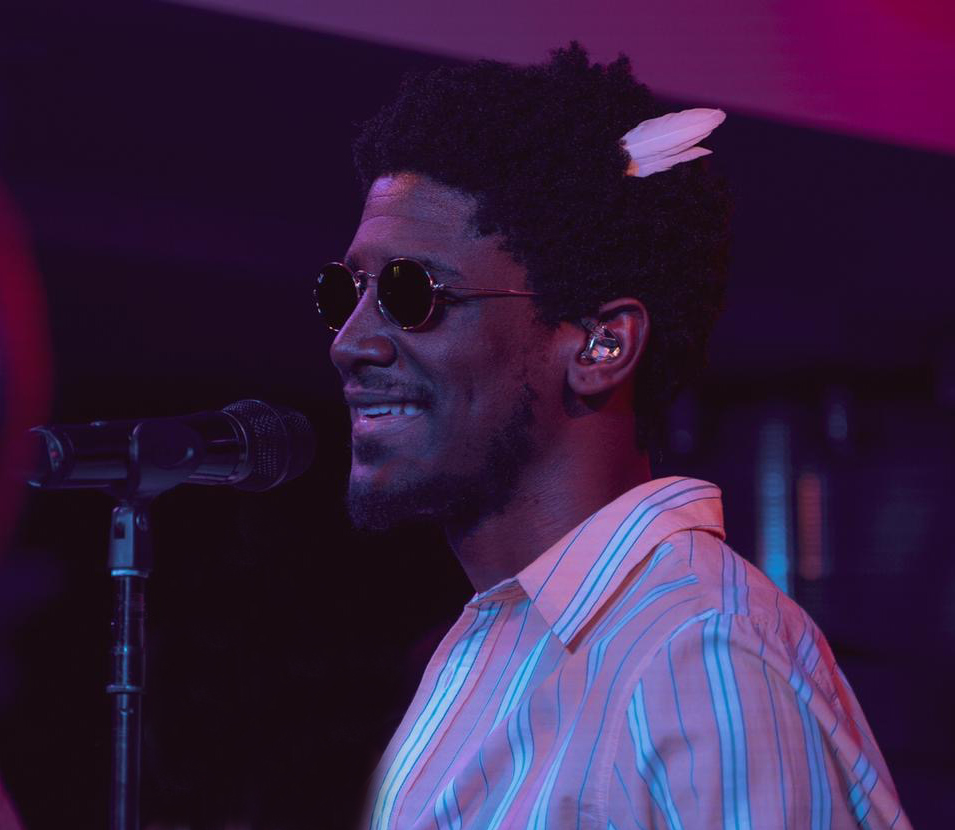
- Labrinth performing at a Deezer Acoustic Session, London, in November 2019
- Studio albums: 5
- Extended plays: 4
- Soundtrack albums: 2
- Singles: 21
- Music videos: 15
- Scores: 3

The discography of British musician and producer Labrinth consists of five studio albums, three scores, two soundtrack albums, four extended plays (EPs), twenty singles and fourteen music videos.

The musician released his debut single, "Let the Sun Shine", in September 2010 where it peaked at number three on the UK Singles Chart; also reaching number thirty-two on the Irish Singles Chart. A second single, "Earthquake", was released in November 2011 debuting at number two in the UK; with first week sales of over 115,000 copies. The track attained international chart success, reaching number twelve in Ireland, number five in New Zealand and number four in Australia; also attaining double platinum and platinum statuses from the Australian Recording Industry Association and the Recording Industry Association of New Zealand respectively. Labrinth's debut studio album, Electronic Earth, was released on 2 April 2012 peaking at number two behind Nicki Minaj's Pink Friday: Roman Reloaded. The release was preceded by "Last Time", which became the artist's third consecutive top five hit in the UK; peaking at number four. A further three singles were released from the album, "Express Yourself", "Treatment", which peaked at number twelve and number fifty respectively– and "Beneath Your Beautiful" featuring Emeli Sandé (November 2012) which became Labrinth's first number-one single in both the UK and Ireland.

Labrinth has also appeared as a featuring artist on several occasions, notably alongside rapper Tinie Tempah. The pair first collaborated on the track "Pass Out" which having been released in February 2010 topped the UK chart; also reaching number six in Ireland. A second collaboration, "Frisky", was released several months later peaking at number two in the UK and number three in Ireland. The musician has also appeared as a featuring artist on Devlin's single "Let It Go" and as part of 'The Collective' on the Children in Need record "Teardrop" which peaked at number fifty-nine and number twenty-four in the UK respectively.

In 2019, Labrinth composed the score to the HBO teen drama Euphoria. The season 1 score album became his first charting album on the US Billboard 200 and entered the top 50 in several countries including Australia, Canada, and Ireland. Album track "Still Don't Know My Name" became a sleeper hit in 2020 and earned Labrinth his first Platinum single in the US. Later in the year he released his second studio album Imagination & the Misfit Kid.

== Albums ==
=== Studio albums ===
List of albums, with selected chart positions
Title	Details	Peak chart positions									Certifications
Title	Details	UK	UK R&B	AUS	CAN	FIN	IRE	NOR	SCO	US	Certifications
Electronic Earth	Released: 2 April 2012; Label: Syco; Formats: LP, CD, digital download, streaming	2	2	30	—	—	19	—	6	—	BPI: Platinum
Imagination & the Misfit Kid	Released: 22 November 2019; Label: Syco, RCA; Formats: LP, digital download, streaming	—	—	—	77	—	—	32	—	151	
Ends & Begins	Released: 28 April 2023; Label: Columbia; Formats: Digital download, streaming	— (Note: Ends & Begins did not enter the UK Albums Chart but peaked at number 78 on the UK Album Downloads Chart.)	—	—	—	50	—	8	—	144	
Cosmic Opera: Act I	Released: 30 January 2026; Label: Columbia; Formats: CD, digital download, streaming	—	—	—	—	—	—	—	—	—	
Cosmic Opera: Act II	Released: 29 May 2026; Label: Columbia; Formats: CD, digital download, streaming	—	—	—	—	—	—	—	—	—	
"—" denotes items which were not released in that country or failed to chart.

=== Scores ===
List of scores, with selected details and chart positions
Title	Details	Peak chart positions										Certifications
Title	Details	UK	AUS	BEL (FL)	CAN	FRA	IRE	NL	NZ	NOR	US	Certifications
Euphoria (Original Score from the HBO Series)	Released: 4 October 2019; Label: Sony Masterworks, Milan; Formats: LP, CD, digital download, streaming	68	29	20	32	75	28	36	16	4	79	BPI: Silver; RMNZ: Platinum; RIAA: Gold
Euphoria Season 2 Official Score (From the HBO Original Series)	Released: 22 April 2022; Label: HBO, Columbia; Formats: CD, digital download, streaming, box set	—	—	—	92	—	—	—	—	—	162	
The Kitchen (Score from the Netflix Film)	Released: 8 March 2024; Label: Columbia; Formats: CD, digital download, streaming	—	—	—	—	—	—	—	—	—	—	

=== Soundtrack albums ===
List of soundtrack albums, with selected details and chart positions
Title	Details	Peak chart positions		
Title	Details	ESP	US Top Sound.	UK Sound.
Euphoria Season 1 (An HBO Original Series Soundtrack)	Released: 14 May 2021; Label: Interscope Records; Formats: CD, digital download, streaming, phonograph records	8	73	—
Euphoria Season 2 (An HBO Original Series Soundtrack)	Released: 4 March 2022; Label: Interscope Records; Formats: CD, digital download, streaming, phonograph records	—	—	12

== Extended plays ==
List of extended plays, with selected details and chart positions
Title	Details	Peak chart positions	
Title	Details	US Curr.	US Heat
iTunes Festival: London 2012	Released: 14 September 2012; Label: Syco; Format: Digital download	—	—
Atomic	Released: 1 February 2013; Label: Odd Child; Format: Digital download	—	—
Beneath Your Beautiful	Released: 27 August 2013; Label: Syco; Format: Digital download	186	5
Prelude	Released: 19 September 2025; Label: Columbia; Format: Digital download, streaming	—	—
You & I	Released: 2 October 2026; Label: Columbia; Format: Digital download, streaming	—	—

== Singles ==
=== As lead artist ===
List of singles as a lead artist, showing year released, selected chart positions, certifications, and album name
Title	Year	Peak chart positions										Certifications	Album
Title	Year	UK	AUS	BEL	IRE	NL	NOR	NZ	SWE	SWI	US	Certifications	Album
"Let the Sun Shine"	2010	3	—	—	32	—	—	—	—	—	—	BPI: Platinum	Electronic Earth
"Earthquake" (featuring Tinie Tempah)	2011	2	4	— (Note: "Earthquake" did not enter the Ultratop 50, but peaked at number six on the Walloon Ultratip chart.)	12	69	16	5	—	—	—	BPI: 2× Platinum; ARIA: 4× Platinum; IFPI NOR: 2× Platinum; RMNZ: 2× Platinum	Electronic Earth
"Last Time"	2012	4	40	—	14	—	—	—	—	—	—	BPI: Silver	Electronic Earth
"Express Yourself"	2012	12	—	— (Note: "Express Yourself" did not enter the Ultratop 50, but peaked at number 22 on the Walloon Ultratip chart.)	22	—	—	—	—	—	—	BPI: Gold	Electronic Earth
"Treatment"	2012	55	33	—	39	—	—	—	—	—	—		Electronic Earth
"Beneath Your Beautiful" (featuring Emeli Sandé)	2012	1	5	4	1	15	—	4	12	17	34	BPI: 3× Platinum; ARIA: 5× Platinum; BEA: Gold; GLF: Platinum; IFPI SWI: Platinum; RIAA: Platinum; RMNZ: 3× Platinum	Electronic Earth
"Let It Be"	2014	11	36	— (Note: "Let It Be" did not enter the Ultratop 50, but peaked at number 50 on the Walloon Ultratip chart.)	44	—	—	—	—	—	—		Non-album singles
"Jealous"	2014	7	18	— (Note: "Jealous" did not enter the Ultratop 50, but peaked at number 54 on the Walloon Ultratip chart.)	27	46	—	—	75	—	—	BPI: 2× Platinum; ARIA: 3× Platinum; RIAA: 2× Platinum; RMNZ: 3× Platinum	Non-album singles
"Misbehaving"	2017	—	—	—	—	—	—	—	—	—	—		Imagination & the Misfit Kid
"Same Team" (featuring Stefflon Don)	2018	—	—	—	—	—	—	—	—	—	—		Non-album singles
"Don't Fence Me In"	2019	—	—	—	—	—	—	—	—	—	—		Non-album singles
"Miracle"	2019	—	—	—	—	—	—	—	—	—	—		Imagination & the Misfit Kid
"Mount Everest"	2019	58	—	—	37	—	—	—	— (Note: "Mount Everest" did not enter the Swedish Singellista Chart, but peaked at number four on the Swedish Heatseeker Chart.)	75	—	BPI: Gold; RIAA: Platinum; RMNZ: Platinum	Imagination & the Misfit Kid
"All for Us" (solo or with Zendaya)	2019	52	49	—	24	—	—	— (Note: "All for Us" did not enter the NZ Top 40 Singles Chart, but peaked at number 16 on the NZ Hot Singles Chart.)	— (Note: "All for Us" did not enter the Swedish Singellista Chart, but peaked at number nine on the Swedish Heatseeker Chart.)	—	—	BPI: Gold; RMNZ: Platinum	Imagination & the Misfit Kid
"Something's Got to Give"	2019	—	—	—	—	—	—	—	—	—	—		Imagination & the Misfit Kid
"Where the Wild Things"	2019	—	—	—	—	—	—	—	—	—	—		Imagination & the Misfit Kid
"Like a Movie"	2019	—	—	—	—	—	—	—	—	—	—		Imagination & the Misfit Kid
"Oblivion" (featuring Sia)	2019	—	—	—	—	—	—	—	—	—	—		Imagination & the Misfit Kid
"No Ordinary"	2020	—	—	—	—	—	—	—	—	—	—		Non-album singles
"Ave Maria"	2020	—	—	—	—	—	—	—	—	—	—		Non-album singles
"Yeh I Fuckin' Did It"	2022	—	—	—	—	—	—	—	—	—	—		Euphoria Season 2 (An HBO Original Series Soundtrack)
"I'm Tired" (with Zendaya)	2022	47	21	—	21	— (Note: "I'm Tired" did not enter the Dutch Top 100 Singles chart, but peaked at number two on the Dutch Single Tip chart.)	26	16	40	64	53	RMNZ: Gold	Euphoria Season 2 (An HBO Original Series Soundtrack)
"Lift Off"	2022	—	—	—	—	—	—	— (Note: "Lift Off" did not enter the NZ Top 40 Singles Chart, but peaked at number 36 on the NZ Hot Singles Chart.)	—	—	—		Non-album single
"Kill for Your Love"	2022	—	—	—	—	—	—	—	—	—	—		Ends & Begins
"Iridium"	2022	—	—	—	—	—	—	—	—	—	—		Non-album single
"Never Felt So Alone"	2023	33	28	—	17	60	37	13	— (Note: "Never Felt So Alone" did not enter the Swedish Singellista Chart, but peaked at number three on the Swedish Heatseeker Chart.)	65	62	BPI: Silver; ARIA: Gold; RIAA: Gold; RMNZ: Platinum	Ends & Begins
"S.W.M.F."	2025	—	—	—	—	—	—	—	—	—	—		Cosmic Opera: Act I
"Orchestra"	2025	—	—	—	—	—	—	—	—	—	—		Cosmic Opera: Act I
"Implosion"	2025	—	—	—	—	—	—	—	—	—	—		Cosmic Opera: Act I
"God Spoke"	2026	—	—	—	—	—	—	—	—	—	—		Cosmic Opera: Act I
"Shut Your Damn"	2026	—	—	—	—	—	—	—	—	—	—		Cosmic Opera: Act II
"Prostitute"	2026	—	—	—	—	—	—	—	—	—	—		Cosmic Opera: Act II
"All Or Nothing" (with Tobe Nwigwe)	2026	—	—	—	—	—	—	—	—	—	—		The Bridge
"I Want to Know What Love Is"	2026	—	—	—	—	—	—	—	—	—	—		You & I
"Surrender"	2026	—	—	—	—	—	—	—	—	—	—		
"—" denotes a recording that did not chart or was not released in that territory.

=== As featured artist ===
List of singles, with selected chart positions and certifications, showing year released and album name
Title	Year	Peak chart positions									Certifications	Album
Title	Year	UK	AUS	BEL	CAN	IRE	NOR	NZ	SWE	US	Certifications	Album
"Frisky" (Tinie Tempah featuring Labrinth)	2010	2	—	—	—	3	—	—	—	—	BPI: Platinum	Disc-Overy
"Let It Go" (Devlin featuring Labrinth)	2011	59	—	—	—	—	—	—	—	—		Bud, Sweat and Beers
"Playing With Fire" (Plan B featuring Labrinth)	2012	78	—	—	—	—	—	—	—	—		iLL Manors
"Lover Not a Fighter" (Tinie Tempah featuring Labrinth)	2013	16	—	— (Note: "Lover Not a Fighter" did not enter the Ultratop 50, but peaked at number sixty on the Walloon Ultratip chart.)	—	30	—	—	—	—		Demonstration
"Higher" (Sigma featuring Labrinth)	2015	12	—	—	—	47	—	—	—	—	BPI: Silver	Life
"Make Me (Cry)" (Noah Cyrus featuring Labrinth)	2016	88	67	— (Note: "Make Me (Cry)" did not enter the Ultratop 50, but peaked at number twenty on the Walloon Ultratip chart.)	46	51	6	— (Note: "Make Me (Cry)" did not enter the NZ Top 40 Singles Chart, but peaked at number five on the NZ Heatseeker Singles Chart.)	20	46	BPI: Silver; ARIA: Gold; GLF: Platinum; RIAA: 2× Platinum; RMNZ: Platinum	Non-album single
"To Be Human" (Sia featuring Labrinth)	2017	—	—	—	—	—	—	—	—	—		Wonder Woman
"Titans" (Major Lazer featuring Sia and Labrinth)	2021	—	—	—	—	—	—	— (Note: "Titans" did not enter the NZ Top 40 Singles Chart, but peaked at number 17 on the NZ Hot Singles Chart.)	— (Note: "Titans" did not enter the Swedish Singellista Chart, but peaked at number two on the Swedish Heatseeker Chart.)	—		Music Is the Weapon (Reloaded)
"(Pick Me Up) Euphoria" (James Blake featuring Labrinth)	2022	—	—	—	—	—	—	—	—	—		Euphoria Season 2 (An HBO Original Series Soundtrack)
"Incredible" (Sia featuring Labrinth)	2024	—	—	—	—	—	—	— (Note: "Incredible" did not enter the NZ Top 40 Singles Chart, but peaked at number 35 on the NZ Hot Singles Chart.)	—	—		Reasonable Woman
"—" denotes a recording that did not chart or was not released in that territory.

=== Promotional singles ===
List of promotional singles, showing year released, selected chart positions, and album name
Title	Year	Peak chart positions						Certifications	Album
Title	Year	UK	AUS	NL	NOR	SWE	SWI	Certifications	Album
"Climb on Board"	2012	—	—	—	—	—	—		Electronic Earth
"Up in Flames" (featuring Devlin and Tinchy Stryder)	2012	—	—	—	—	—	—		Electronic Earth
"Fragile" (with Kygo)	2016	109	74	78	1	55	50	RMNZ: Gold	Cloud Nine
"Sin" (Demo)	2019	—	—	—	—	—	—		Non-album singles
"Never Ending Fairytales" (Demo)	2019	—	—	—	—	—	—		Non-album singles
"Where Love Lives"	2025	—	—	—	—	—	—		Non-album singles
"Tarentino"	2026	—	—	—	—	—	—		Non-album singles
"—" denotes a recording that did not chart or was not released in that territory.

=== Charity singles ===
Title	Year	Peak chart positions		Certifications	Notes
Title	Year	UK	AUS	Certifications	Notes
"Teardrop" (as part of The Collective)	2011	24	—		The official single for the 2011 Children in Need appeal.
"Bridge over Troubled Water" (as part of Artists for Grenfell)	2017	1	53	BPI: Gold	The official single for the 2017 Grenfell Tower fire appeal.
"—" denotes a recording that did not chart or was not released in that territory.

== Other charted songs ==
Title	Year	Peak chart positions										Certifications	Album
Title	Year	UK	AUS	BEL Tip	CAN	IRE	NL Tip	NOR	SWE	SWI	US	Certifications	Album
"We Bring the Stars Out" (Tinie Tempah featuring Labrinth and Eric Turner)	2011	40	—	—	—	—	—	—	—	—	—		non-album song
"Losers" (The Weeknd featuring Labrinth)	2015	91	—	—	88	—	—	—	72	—	85	ARIA: Gold	Beauty Behind the Madness
"Majesty" (with Nicki Minaj featuring Eminem)	2018	41	—	—	44	50	—	—	—	—	58	ARIA: Gold	Queen
"Love Goes" (Sam Smith featuring Labrinth)	2020	—	—	—	—	—	—	—	— (Note: "Love Goes" did not enter the Swedish Singellista Chart, but peaked at number five on the Swedish Heatseeker Chart.)	—	—		Love Goes
"Still Don't Know My Name"	2020	52	57	14	64	29	2	34	57	83	— (Note: "Still Don't Know My Name" did not enter the Billboard Hot 100, but peaked at number 15 on the Bubbling Under Hot 100 chart.)	BPI: Gold; ARIA: Gold; GLF: Platinum; RIAA: Platinum; RMNZ: Platinum	Euphoria (Original Score from the HBO Series)
"Formula"	2022	81	90	—	—	57	—	—	— (Note: "Formula" did not enter the Swedish Singellista Chart, but peaked at number two on the Swedish Heatseeker Chart.)	—	—	BPI: Gold; ARIA: Gold; RIAA: Platinum; RMNZ: Platinum	Euphoria (Original Score from the HBO Series)
"Forever"	2022	—	—	—	—	86	—	—	— (Note: "Forever" did not enter the Swedish Singellista Chart, but peaked at number 13 on the Swedish Heatseeker Chart.)	97	—	BPI: Silver; ARIA: Gold; RIAA: Platinum; RMNZ: Platinum	Euphoria (Original Score from the HBO Series)
"When I R.I.P."	2022	—	—	—	—	—	—	—	— (Note: "When I R.I.P." did not enter the Swedish Singellista Chart, but peaked at number 12 on the Swedish Heatseeker Chart.)	75	—	RIAA: Gold; RMNZ: Gold	Euphoria (Original Score from the HBO Series)
"The Feels"	2023	—	—	—	—	—	—	—	97	—	—		Ends & Begins
"—" denotes a recording that did not chart or was not released in that territory.

== Guest appearances ==
Title	Year	Other artist(s)	Album
"Oh My God"	2010	Professor Green	Alive Till I'm Dead
"Oh My God"	2011	Coldside	Imagine
"It's OK"	2013	Tinie Tempah	Demonstration
"Losers"	2015	The Weeknd	Beauty Behind the Madness
"What We Leave Behind"	2015	None	Miss You Already (Original Motion Picture Soundtrack)
"Silence"	2016	Mike Posner	At Night, Alone.
"Majesty"	2018	Nicki Minaj, Eminem	Queen
"Don't Go Hungry"	2019	Giggs	Big Bad...
"Love Goes"	2020	Sam Smith	Love Goes
"I Pray For You (feat. No Malice)"	2022	Pusha T, No Malice	It's Almost Dry

== Music videos ==
Title	Year	Artist	Director
"Pass Out"	2010	Tinie Tempah (featuring Labrinth)	Tim Brown
"Frisky"	2010	Tinie Tempah (featuring Labrinth)	Tim Brown
"Let the Sun Shine"	2010	Labrinth	Rankin
"Let It Go"	2010	Devlin (featuring Labrinth)	Henry Schofield
"Earthquake"	2011	Labrinth (featuring Tinie Tempah)	Syndrome Studios
"Teardrop"	2011	The Collective	Ben Vertex and Ben Leinster
"Last Time"	2012	Labrinth	Colin Tilley
"Express Yourself"	2012	Labrinth	Jonas & Francois
"Treatment"	2012	Labrinth	David Mould
"Beneath Your Beautiful"	2012	Labrinth (featuring Emeli Sandé)	Sophie Muller
"Playing With Fire"	2012	Plan B (featuring Labrinth)	—N/a
"Let It Be"	2014	Labrinth	—N/a
"Jealous"	2014	Labrinth	—N/a
"Higher"	2015	Sigma (featuring Labrinth)	—N/a
"Imagine (Quarantine Edition)"	2020	Artists for We Are One	—N/a

== Songwriting and production credits ==
Title	Year	Artist(s)	Album	Credits	Written with:	Produced with:
"A.D.H.D. (Intro)"	2008	Master Shortie	A.D.H.D.			
"Bringing It Back"	2008	Master Shortie	A.D.H.D.			
"Nothing To Be Scared Of (Prince Charming)"	2008	Master Shortie	A.D.H.D.			
"Under the Moon"	2008	Master Shortie	A.D.H.D.			
"Swagger Chick"	2008	Master Shortie	A.D.H.D.			
"Have It Your Way"	2008	Master Shortie	A.D.H.D.			
"Groupie Love"	2008	Master Shortie	A.D.H.D.			
"Rope Chain"	2008	Master Shortie	A.D.H.D.			
"Right Time"	2008	Master Shortie	A.D.H.D.			
"London Town"	2008	Master Shortie	A.D.H.D.			
"Why (Interlude)"	2008	Master Shortie	A.D.H.D.			
"Dance Like a White Boy"	2008	Master Shortie	A.D.H.D.			
"Dead End"	2008	Master Shortie	A.D.H.D.			
"Space to Breathe"	2009	Bluey Robinson	Non-album singles			
"I Know"	2009	Bluey Robinson	Non-album singles			
"Warning"	2009	Tinchy Stryder	Catch 22			
"Pass Out"	2010	Tinie Tempah	Disc-Overy			
"Frisky"	2010	Tinie Tempah	Disc-Overy			
"Wonderman"	2010	Tinie Tempah, Ellie Goulding	Disc-Overy			
"Oh My God"	2010	Professor Green	Alive Till I'm Dead			
"Love Drunk"	2010	Loick Essien	Identity			
"Let It Hit You"	2010	Ola Svensson	Ola			
"So Much"	2010	Raghav, Kardinal Offishall	The Phoenix			
"Let It Go"	2011	Devlin	Bud, Sweat and Beers			
"Finish Line"	2011	Yasmin	Yasmin			
"Showgirl"	2011	Bluey Robinson	—N/a			
"Neva Soft"	2011	Ms. Dynamite	—N/a			
"Teardrop"	2011	The Collective	—N/a			
"Forgiveness"	2011	Wretch 32, Etta Bond	Black and White			
"Playing with Fire"	2012	Plan B	iLL Manors			
"Lost in Paradise"	2012	Rihanna	Unapologetic			
"Watchtower"	2013	Devlin, Ed Sheeran	A Moving Picture			
"It's OK"	2013	Tinie Tempah	Demonstration			
"Lover Not a Fighter"	2013	Tinie Tempah	Demonstration			
"R U Crazy"	2015	Conor Maynard	TBA			
"Royalty"	2015	Conor Maynard	TBA			
"Losers"	2015	The Weeknd	Beauty Behind the Madness	Co-writer/Producer	Carlo Montagnese, Abel Tesfaye	Illangelo, The Weeknd
"Stargirl Interlude"	2016	The Weeknd, Lana Del Rey	Starboy	Co-writer/Producer	Lana Del Rey, Martin McKinney, Abel Tesfaye	Doc McKinney
"Make Me (Cry)"	2016	Noah Cyrus	Non-album single	Co-writer/Producer	Noah Cyrus	None
"Save Myself"	2017	Ed Sheeran	÷	Co-writer/Producer	Ed Sheeran, Amy Wadge	Ed Sheeran
"I'm Stuck"	2017	Noah Cyrus	Non-album singles	Co-writer/Producer	Jenna Andrews, Noah Cyrus, Samuel Romans	Jenna Andrews
"Again"	2017	Noah Cyrus, XXXTentacion	Non-album singles	Co-writer/Producer	Noah Cyrus, Jahseh Onfroy	None
"Majesty"	2018	Nicki Minaj, Eminem	Queen	Co-writer/Producer	Onika Maraj, Marshall Mathers, Luis Resto	Eminem
"Live or Die"	2018	Noah Cyrus, Lil Xan	Non-album single	Co-writer/Producer	Noah Cyrus, Diego Leanos, Ilsey Juber	None
"Don't Go Hungry"	2019	Giggs	BIG BAD...	Co-writer/Producer	Nathaniel Thompson	Giggs
"Spirit"	2019	Beyoncé	The Lion King: Original Motion Picture Soundtrack	Co-writer/Producer	Beyoncé Knowles-Carter, Ilya Salmanzadeh	
"Spirit"	2019	Beyoncé	The Lion King: The Gift	Co-writer/Producer	Beyoncé Knowles-Carter, Ilya Salmanzadeh	
"God Is"	2019	Kanye West	Jesus Is King	Co-writer/Producer	Victory Elyse Boyd, Warryn Campbell, Robert Fryson, Angel Lopez, Federico Vindver, Kanye West	Warryn Campbell, Angel Lopez, Federico Vindver, Kanye West
"The Lighthouse Keeper"	2020	Sam Smith	The Holly & The Ivy	Co-writer/Producer	Sam Smith	None
"Music"	2021	Sia	Music – Songs from and Inspired by the Motion Picture	Co-producer	—N/a	Oliver Kraus
"Beautiful Things Can Happen"	2021	Sia	Music – Songs from and Inspired by the Motion Picture	Co-producer	—N/a	Matt Corby

== Remixes ==
- 2010: Gorillaz featuring Bobby Womack, Mos Def and Tinie Tempah – "Stylo (Labrinth SNES Remix)"
- 2010: Jessie J – "Do It like a Dude"
- 2011: Loick Essien – "Love Drunk"
- 2012: Birdy Nam Nam – "Written in the Sand"
- 2013: Conor Maynard – "R U Crazy"
