= Beneath Your Beautiful =

2012 single by Labrinth and Emeli Sandé

Single by Labrinth featuring Emeli Sandé

from the album Electronic Earth
- Released: 18 October 2012
- Studio: Metropolis Studios (London); Strongroom (Shoreditch)
- Genre: R&B
- Length: 4:32 (album version); 3:56 (radio edit)
- Label: Syco
- Songwriters: Timothy McKenzie; Adele Emeli Sandé; Mike Posner
- Producers: Labrinth; Da Digglar

Labrinth singles chronology
| "Treatment" (2012) | "Beneath Your Beautiful" (2012) | "Playing with Fire" (2012) |

Emeli Sandé singles chronology
| "Wonder" (2012) | "Beneath Your Beautiful" (2012) | "Clown" (2013) |

"Beneath Your Beautiful" is a song by British musicians Labrinth and Emeli Sandé. Written by Labrinth, Mike Posner and Sandé, it was promoted as the sixth single from Labrinth's debut album, Electronic Earth (2012), and is included as a bonus track on the US Deluxe Edition of Sandé's debut studio album Our Version of Events. Impacting from 18 October 2012, and following a well-received performance on the ninth series of The X Factor, the single would go on to sell 108,000 copies in the UK during its first week and top the UK Singles Chart. It became Labrinth's first number one single as a lead artist and additionally became his first top 40 hit on the US Billboard Hot 100, where it peaked at number 34. The song was nominated for 'Best British Single' at the 2013 Brit Awards and was ranked the twelfth best-selling single of 2012 in the UK.

== Background and release ==
"Beneath Your Beautiful" is an R&B ballad written by Labrinth, Mike Posner, and Emeli Sandé. It was recorded as a duet between Labrinth and Sandé for Labrinth's debut studio album Electronic Earth. The title of the song attracted attention from fans, some of whom questioned Labrinth about the spelling of the word "Your" within the song's title, believing that was a grammatical error and should have been spelt "You're" (although the song's lyrics use the words "beautiful" and "perfect" as nouns). Upon reaching number one, fans asked Labrinth via social networking website Twitter about the spelling. He replied "Can I make something clear! this is twitter! Not an English GCSE haha I’ll spell as BADLY as I wish awritemayte!... Oh is this about #Beneath”YOUR”Beautiful I love how crazy this has sent people…. It was to annoy English teachers and grammar Nazis." [sic] The song was nominated for the Brit Award for Best British Single at the 2013 Brit Awards.

== Chart and sales performance ==
The song was released in the UK on 18 November 2011. Originally only reaching number 200 in the UK Singles Chart on 14 April 2012, it peaked at number one on 28 October 2012, selling 108,000 copies in its first week of release. This became Labrinth's first number one single as a solo artist, and Sandé's second number one overall. To date, "Beneath Your Beautiful" has peaked within the top 40 in over 15 countries worldwide. The song was the 12th best-selling single of 2012 in the UK, with 663,000 copies sold. The British Phonographic Industry (BPI) later certified the single triple platinum for sales and streams exceeding 1,800,000 units.

== Music video ==
The music video for the track was uploaded to Labrinth's official Vevo account on YouTube on 5 October 2012. The video features Labrinth and Sandé performing the track while standing in front of a giant screen, which features images of them both.

== Live performances ==
On 21 October 2012, Labrinth and Sandé performed the song live for the first time on The X Factor, which led to the sales boost that got it number one. Since the performance on The X Factor, the video has gained more than 14 million views.

At Capital FM's Summertime Ball 2013, on Sunday 9 June 2013, Labrinth performed the song with The X Factor 2012 finalist Ella Henderson live, as part of his setlist, with Henderson replacing Sandé.

== Track listing ==
Digital download - album track
| No. | Title | Length |
|---|---|---|
| 1. | "Beneath Your Beautiful" (featuring Emeli Sandé) | 4:32 |
| Total length: | | 4:32 |

CD single
| No. | Title | Length |
|---|---|---|
| 1. | "Beneath Your Beautiful" (featuring Emeli Sandé) (radio edit) | 3:56 |
| 2. | "Beneath Your Beautiful" (featuring Emeli Sandé) (Naughty Boy remix) | 4:31 |
| Total length: | | 8:27 |

Digital EP 1
| No. | Title | Length |
|---|---|---|
| 1. | "Beneath Your Beautiful" (featuring Emeli Sandé) (radio edit) | 3:56 |
| 2. | "Beneath Your Beautiful" (featuring Emeli Sandé) (Naughty Boy remix) | 4:31 |
| 3. | "Beneath Your Beautiful" (featuring Emeli Sandé) (Rollz Remix edit) | 3:43 |
| 4. | "Beneath Your Beautiful" (featuring Emeli Sandé) (instrumental) | 4:33 |
| Total length: | | 16:42 |

Digital EP 2 - exclusive to Spotify
| No. | Title | Length |
|---|---|---|
| 1. | "Beneath Your Beautiful" (featuring Emeli Sandé) (radio edit) | 3:56 |
| 2. | "Beneath Your Beautiful" (featuring Emeli Sandé) (Naughty Boy remix) | 4:32 |
| 3. | "Beneath Your Beautiful" (featuring Emeli Sandé) (Rollz Remix edit) | 3:44 |
| 4. | "Beneath Your Beautiful" (featuring Emeli Sandé) (instrumental) | 4:33 |
| 5. | "Beneath Your Beautiful" (featuring Emeli Sandé) (Seamus Haji remix extended) | 6:03 |
| Total length: | | 24:16 |

Digital Remixes EP - exclusive to iTunes
| No. | Title | Length |
|---|---|---|
| 1. | "Beneath Your Beautiful" (featuring Emeli Sandé) (radio edit) | 3:56 |
| 2. | "Beneath Your Beautiful" (featuring Emeli Sandé) (Naughty Boy remix) | 4:31 |
| 3. | "Beneath Your Beautiful" (featuring Emeli Sandé) (Rollz Remix extended version) | 5:13 |
| 4. | "Beneath Your Beautiful" (featuring Emeli Sandé) (Seamus Haji remix extended) | 4:33 |
| 5. | "Beneath Your Beautiful" (featuring Emeli Sandé) (music video) | 4:27 |
| Total length: | | 24:10 |

US EP
| No. | Title | Writer(s) | Producer(s) | Length |
|---|---|---|---|---|
| 1. | "Beneath Your Beautiful" (featuring Emeli Sandé) | McKenzie; Emeli Sandé; Mike Posner | Labrinth; Da Digglar | 4:31 |
| 2. | "Express Yourself" | McKenzie; Charles Wright | Labrinth | 4:03 |
| 3. | "Let the Sun Shine" | McKenzie | Labrinth; Da Digglar | 2:59 |
| 4. | "Treatment" | McKenzie; Rami Yacoub; Carl Falk | Labrinth; Da Digglar | 4:30 |
| 5. | "Earthquake" (featuring Tinie Tempah) | McKenzie; Marc Williams; Patrick Okogwu | Labrinth | 4:34 |
| 6. | "Vultures" | McKenzie; Claude Kelly; Wayne Hector | Labrinth; Da Digglar | 4:17 |
| 7. | "Last Time" (Target bonus track) | McKenzie; Williams | Labrinth; Da Digglar | 4:23 |
| 8. | "Climb on Board" (Target bonus track) | McKenzie; Williams | Labrinth; Da Digglar | 3:58 |

Notes

- "Express Yourself" contains a sample song of the same name written by Charles Wright and performed by Charles Wright & the Watts 103rd Street Rhythm Band and "Funky Drummer" written and performed by James Brown.

== Charts ==
=== Weekly charts ===
| Chart (2012–13) | Peak position |
|---|---|
| Australia (ARIA) | 5 |
| Austria (Ö3 Austria Top 40) | 10 |
| Belgium (Ultratop 50 Flanders) | 4 |
| Belgium (Ultratop 50 Wallonia) | 30 |
| Canada Hot 100 (Billboard) | 39 |
| Czech Republic Airplay (ČNS IFPI) | 5 |
| Denmark (Tracklisten) | 26 |
| Euro Digital Song Sales (Billboard) | 4 |
| France (SNEP) | 103 |
| Germany (GfK) | 25 |
| Hungary (Rádiós Top 40) | 22 |
| Ireland (IRMA) | 1 |
| Israel International Airplay (Media Forest) | 10 |
| Netherlands (Dutch Top 40) | 16 |
| Netherlands (Single Top 100) | 15 |
| New Zealand (Recorded Music NZ) | 4 |
| Poland Airplay (ZPAV) | 1 |
| Portuguese Digital Sales (Billboard) | 1 |
| Scottish Singles Sales (Official Charts) | 1 |
| Slovakia Airplay (ČNS IFPI) | 4 |
| South Korea International (Gaon) | 41 |
| Sweden (Sverigetopplistan) | 12 |
| Switzerland (Schweizer Hitparade) | 17 |
| UK Radio Airplay (Nielsen Soundscan) | 1 |
| UK Singles (Official Charts) | 1 (Note: "Beneath Your Beautiful" peaked on the UK Singles Chart on a sales-only week. Streaming data was not factored into the chart until July 2014.) |
| UK Streaming (Official Charts) | 1 |
| UK TV Airplay (Nielsen Soundscan) | 1 |
| UK Hip Hop/R&B (Official Charts) | 4 |
| US Billboard Hot 100 | 34 |
| US Pop Airplay (Billboard) | 26 |
| US Adult Pop Airplay (Billboard) | 23 |

=== Year-end charts ===
| Chart (2012) | Position |
|---|---|
| Netherlands (Dutch Top 40) | 100 |
| UK Singles (OCC) | 12 |

| Chart (2013) | Position |
|---|---|
| Australia (ARIA) | 18 |
| Austria (Ö3 Austria Top 40) | 50 |
| Belgium (Ultratop 50 Flanders) | 39 |
| Germany (Media Control AG) | 100 |
| Netherlands (Dutch Top 40) | 80 |
| New Zealand (Recorded Music NZ) | 14 |
| Sweden (Sverigetopplistan) | 65 |
| UK Singles (OCC) | 91 |

== Certifications ==
| Region | Certification | Certified units/sales |
|---|---|---|
| Australia (ARIA) | 5× Platinum | 350,000^{^} |
| Austria (IFPI Austria) | Gold | 15,000^{*} |
| Belgium (BRMA) | Gold | 15,000^{*} |
| Germany (BVMI) | Gold | 150,000^{^} |
| New Zealand (RMNZ) | 3× Platinum | 45,000^{*} |
| Portugal (AFP) | Gold | 10,000^{‡} |
| Sweden (GLF) | Platinum | 40,000^{‡} |
| Switzerland (IFPI Switzerland) | Platinum | 30,000^{^} |
| United Kingdom (BPI) | 3× Platinum | 1,800,000^{‡} |
| United States (RIAA) | Platinum | 1,000,000^{‡} |
Streaming
| Denmark (IFPI Danmark) | Platinum | 1,800,000^{†} |
^{*} Sales figures based on certification alone.^{^} Shipments figures based on certification alone.^{‡} Sales+streaming figures based on certification alone.^{†} Streaming-only figures based on certification alone.

== Release history ==
| Country | Release date | Format | Label |
|---|---|---|---|
| United Kingdom | 18 October 2012 | Impact Day | Syco |
| United States | 16 November 2012 | Digital download | RCA |
| Germany | 21 December 2012 | Digital EP | Sony |
| Germany | 13 January 2013 | CD single | Sony |
| United States | 26 March 2013 | Mainstream radio | RCA |
| United States | 27 August 2013 | Digital EP | RCA |
