= Euphoria Season 1 (An HBO Original Series Soundtrack) =

Euphoria Season 1 (An HBO Original Series Soundtrack

Compilation album by Euphoria
- Released: May 14, 2021
- Length: 42:33
- Label: Interscope Records
- Producer: Labrinth

Euphoria chronology
Euphoria (Original Score from the HBO Series) (2019)	Euphoria Season 1 (An HBO Original Series Soundtrack (2021)	Euphoria Season 2 (An HBO Original Series Soundtrack) (2022)

Singles from Euphoria Season 1
- 1. "All for Us" Released: August 4, 2019; 2. "Love Me Low" Released: June 24, 2020; 3. "Lo Vas a Olvidar" Released: January 21, 2021

Euphoria Season 1 (An HBO Original Series Soundtrack) is the compilation album to the first season of the American teen drama television series Euphoria, released by Interscope Records on May 14, 2021, with phonograph records on September 3. The album has three singles, "All for Us" by Labrinth and Zendaya, "Love Me Low" by Ai Bendr, and "Lo Vas a Olvidar" by Billie Eilish and Rosalía.

== Background ==
Adam Leber and Jen Malone are the music supervisors for Euphoria. Leber got his client Labrinth hired as the show's composer after playing his music to series creator Sam Levinson.

== Commercial performance ==
The compilation album's release was preceded by three singles, "All for Us" by Labrinth and Zendaya on August 4, 2019, and two songs from the 2021 special episode "Fuck Anyone Who's Not a Sea Blob"; "Love Me Low" by Ai Bendr on June 24, 2020, and "Lo Vas a Olvidar" by Billie Eilish and Rosalía on January 21, 2021.

== Accolades ==
At the 72nd Primetime Creative Arts Emmy Awards, Malone and Leber were nominated for the Primetime Emmy Award for Outstanding Music Supervision for their work in the first season finale "And Salt the Earth Behind You". Labrinth won the Primetime Emmy Award for Outstanding Original Music and Lyrics for his work on "All for Us" in the same episode. "All for Us" also won Labrinth and Zendaya the Hollywood Music in Media Award for Best Original Song in a TV Show/Limited Series in 2021. In In 2021, "Lo Vas a Olvidar" was nominated for the MTV MIAW Award for Music-Ship of the Year. The same year, the music video won the MTV Video Music Award for Best Latin. On July 22, 2021, Eilish and Rosalía were nominated for the Premios Juventud for Girl Power for the song., "Lo Vas a Olvidar" was nominated for the MTV MIAW Award for Music-Ship of the Year. The same year, the music video won the MTV Video Music Award for Best Latin. On July 22, 2021, Eilish and Rosalía were nominated for the Premios Juventud for best all female collaboration for the song.

== Track listing ==
Euphoria Season 1 (An HBO Original Series Soundtrack) track listing
No.	Title	Artist(s)	Length
1.	"All for Us"	Labrinth and Zendaya	3:12
2.	"Mount Everest"	Labrinth	2:37
3.	"Fly Me to the Moon"	Bobby Womack	2:08
4.	"Even the Nights Are Better"	Air Supply	3:52
5.	"Work"	Charlotte Day Wilson	3:44
6.	"Champagne Coast"	Blood Orange	4:52
7.	"Taking Responsibility"	Kilo Kish	3:29
8.	"Run the Road"	Santigold	4:22
9.	"Hot"	The Last Artful, Dodgr	3:10
10.	"Be Mine"	Amandla Stenberg	3:40
11.	"My Body Is a Cage"	Arcade Fire	4:47
12.	"Lo Vas a Olvidar"	Billie Eilish and Rosalía	3:23
13.	"Love Me Low"	Ai Bendr	2:29
Total length:			42:33

== Charts ==
Chart performance for Euphoria Season 1 (An HBO Original Series Soundtrack)
Chart (2022)	Peak position
Spanish Albums (Promusicae)	73
US Top Soundtracks (Billboard)	8

== Release history ==
Release dates and formats for Euphoria Season 1 (An HBO Original Series Soundtrack)
Region	Date	Format	Label	Reference
Various	May 14, 2021	Digital download; streaming	Interscope Records	
Various	September 3, 2021	LP	Interscope Records	
