= Lo Vas a Olvidar =

2021 single by Billie Eilish and Rosalía

Single by Billie Eilish and Rosalía

from the album Euphoria Season 1 (An HBO Original Series Soundtrack)
- Language: Spanish; English
- English title: "You Are Going to Forget It"
- Released: January 21, 2021
- Recorded: January 2019
- Genre: Art pop
- Length: 3:23
- Label: Darkroom; Interscope
- Songwriters: Rosalía Vila Tobella; Billie Eilish O'Connell; Finneas O'Connell; Pablo Díaz-Reixa
- Producer: Finneas

Billie Eilish singles chronology
"Therefore I Am" (2020)	"Lo Vas a Olvidar" (2021)	"Your Power" (2021)

Rosalía singles chronology
"Relación (remix)" (2020)	"Lo Vas a Olvidar" (2021)	"La Noche de Anoche" (2021)

Music video
- "Lo Vas a Olvidar" on YouTube

"Lo Vas a Olvidar" ([lo ˌβas a olβiˈðaɾ]; transl. "You Are Going to Forget It") is a song by American singer Billie Eilish and Spanish singer Rosalía. The track was written by both performers alongside El Guincho and Eilish's brother and producer Finneas O'Connell. It was released by Darkroom and Interscope Records on January 21, 2021 to coincide with "Fuck Anyone Who's Not a Sea Blob", a special episode of the American teen drama series Euphoria which prominently featured the song. It is the third and final single to Euphoria Season 1 (An HBO Original Series Soundtrack), released on May 14.

== Background ==
On February 26, 2019, American songwriter Billie Eilish told BBC Radio 1 that she and Spanish singer Rosalía had a recording session where they made a song together. Eilish also talked about what it was like to work with Rosalía: "It was great, she actually knows what she wants," Eilish said. "That's why it was kind of refreshing 'cause I was like, 'Wow, you're the only other person I've really met that's like this'".

Eilish performed a concert at the Sant Jordi Club in Barcelona on March 9, and the following day Rosalía posted a picture of both on social media and stated "can't wait to finish our song. Sharing with you in the studio or seeing you live yesterday inspires me very much". Later that month Eilish revealed that the song was half in Spanish and half in English and described it as "beautiful", and said that they were "both in love with it". Due to Rosalía embarking on her El Mal Querer Tour from March to December 2019 and Eilish preparing for her When We All Fall Asleep Tour (which ran from April to November) the song remained unfinished due to scheduling conflicts.

In January 2021, producer Finneas O'Connell expressed admiration for a Billboard article about the bilingual collaborations the magazine anticipated. The official announcement of the song was made on January 19 on social media, alongside the trailer for "Fuck Anyone Who's Not a Sea Blob" the second of two specials of the American teen drama series Euphoria. The episode was broadcast on HBO on January 24, after being broadcast early on HBO Max on January 21. "Lo Vas a Olvidar" featured prominently in the bottle episode, which depicts Hunter Schafer's character Jules Vaughn in therapy, and plays over a scene of flashbacks to Euphoria protagonist Rue Bennett (Zendaya). The song was the third single to the compilation album, Euphoria Season 1 (An HBO Original Series Soundtrack), released on May 14.

== Composition ==
"Lo Vas a Olvidar" is a hymn-based ballad incorporating "inventive art pop". Steffanee Wong of Nylon stated that the song is sung entirely a capella, and mentioned it had "sparse nature sounds and atmospheric synths forming a misty backdrop, as Eilish and Rosalía do vocal gymnastics around each other, sometimes in English but mostly in Spanish."

During an interview with Lowe, Eilish stated that the making of this song "is the longest lead-up in the world". The first joint recording session took place in Los Angeles in January 2019, where most of the song was written and recorded. During the session "Rosalía had opened a channel in Eilish that she hadn't tried before", reaching a new range of high notes. Eilish insisted on singing in Spanish, because the language "makes you sound better". Rosalía coached the non-fluent Eilish and translated the lyrics to her. In July, a second collaborative session was held in the United States.

In April 2020, Rosalía told Zane Lowe that while in COVID-19 lockdown, she had been working on the track for over two consecutive weeks. By that time the arrangements, the production design, and Rosalía's vocals were completed, only Eilish's vocals needed to be sent. Producer Finneas O'Connell told the press that the song went through a lot of stages, something quite rare since he and his sister usually keep the first impression as the final sound. Rosalía's part and the arrangements for the song were reportedly finished by April 2020. Although the track was scheduled to be released during summertime in 2020, the production was revamped during that time and the final verses were added by Eilish with a little help from other O'Connell family members.

== Commercial performance ==
A music video for "Lo Vas a Olvidar" was released the same day as the song. The video was directed by Nabil Elderkin. The music features Eilish and Rosalía alone in a dark room, lit only by a moving spotlight, singing into a shadowy and stormy void.

== Reception ==
=== Critical response ===
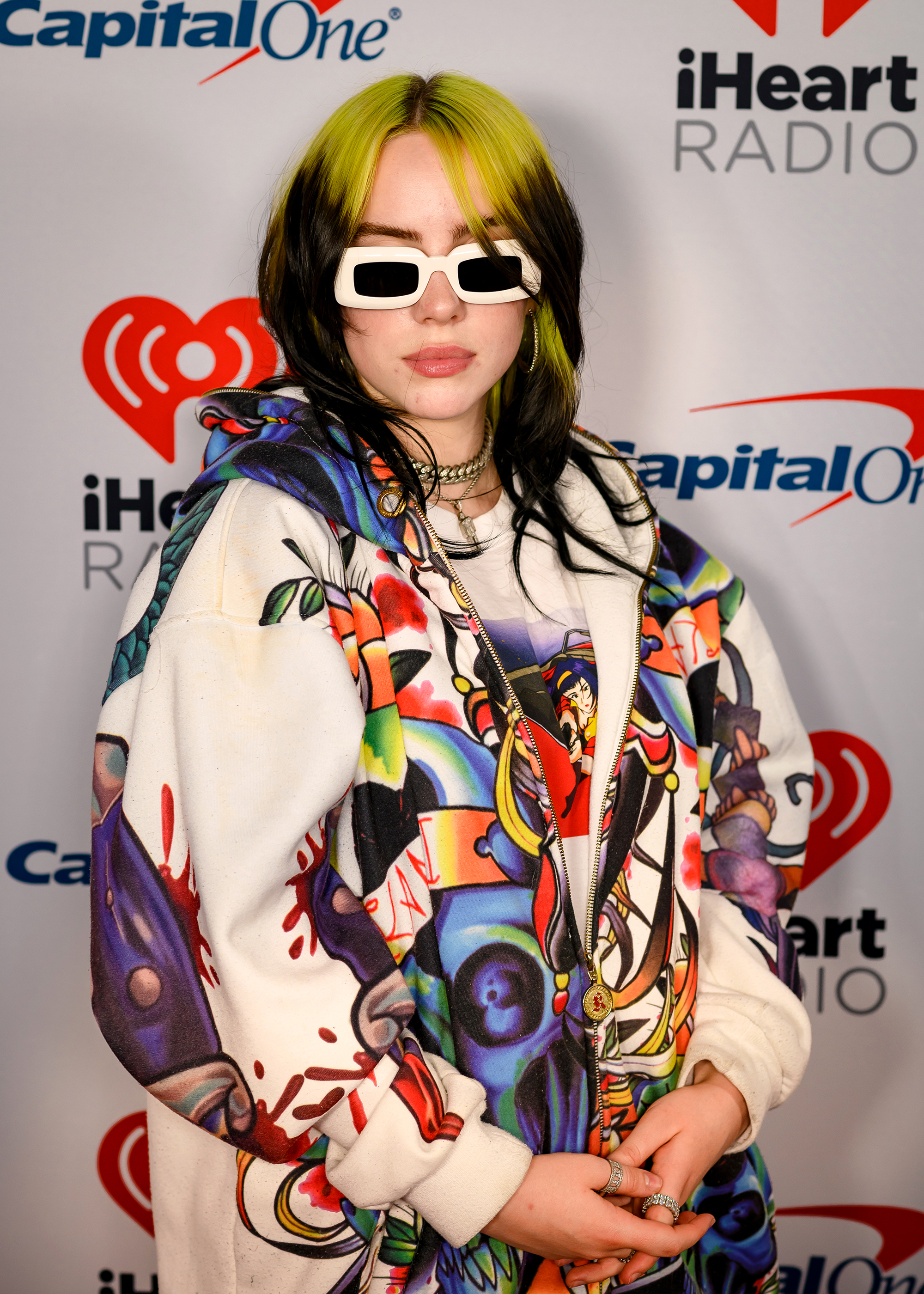
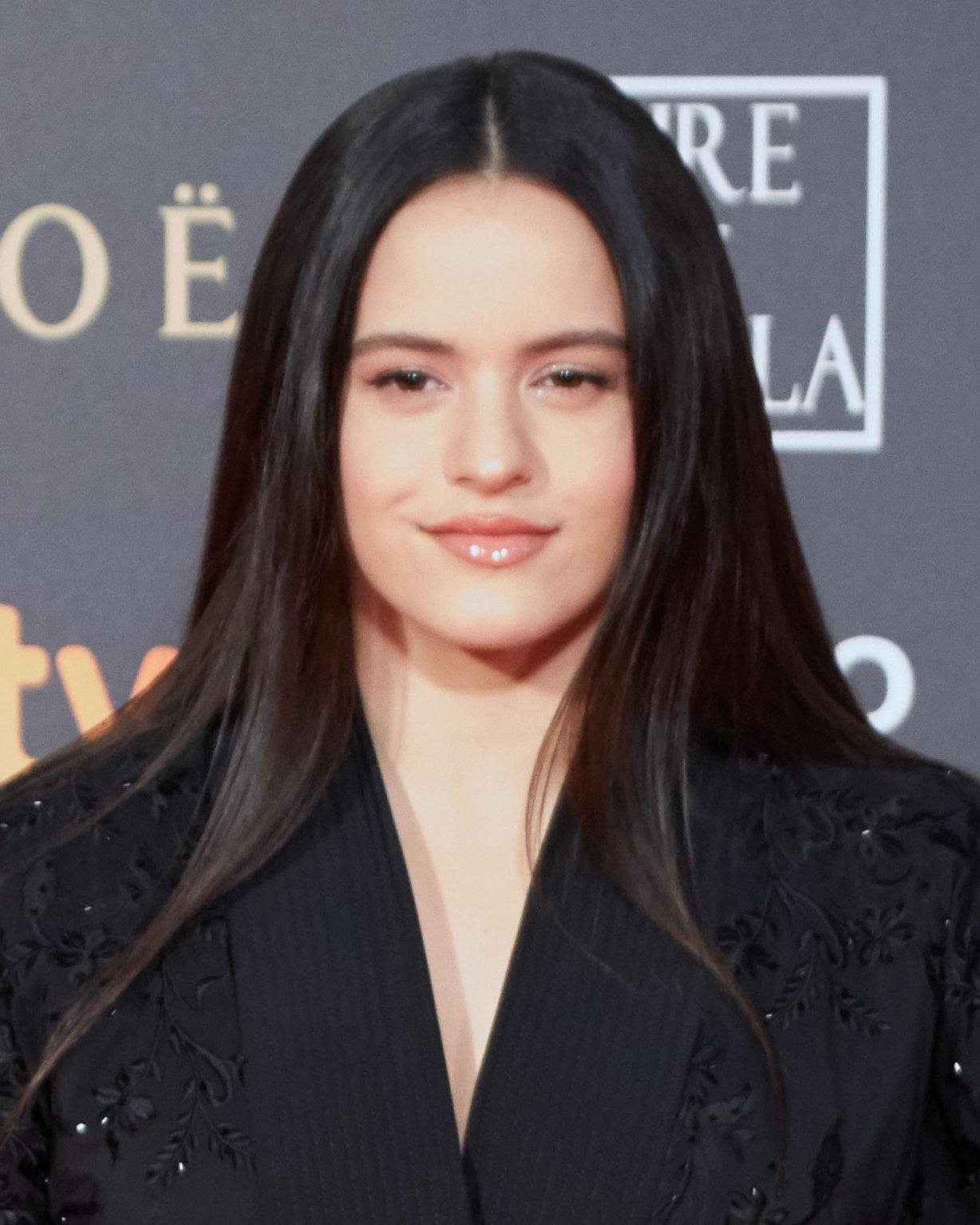
Billie Eilish and Rosalía's multilingual collaboration was praised by critics.

"Lo Vas a Olvidar" received generally positive reviews from critics. Chris Deville of Stereogum described the track as "ominous" and "minimal". Marcus Jones of Entertainment Weekly viewed the song as "haunting". Seventeen's Carolyn Twersky praised the song as "beautiful". Writing for Pitchfork, Eric Torres commented that "Eilish and Rosalía's rich harmonies create a supernal vibe entirely their own, amounting to a decent if inessential addition to their catalogs". Patrick Hosken of MTV said it features a "dreamlike plane where slight shifts in mood and atmosphere are guided by powerful vocal moments from each."

Shakiel Mahjouri of Entertainment Tonight Canada described the music video's visuals as "intoxicating" and "trance-like". The staff of People magazine viewed the video as "dreamlike". Jem Aswad of Variety called the video "moody" and "atmospheric". Jordan Darville of The Fader said that the video was "very intense, yet glamorous." Writing for Complex, Joe Price described the visual as "striking," and noted that it "pairs well with the song."

=== Accolades ===
In 2021, "Lo Vas a Olvidar" was nominated for the MTV MIAW Award for Music-Ship of the Year. The same year, the music video won the MTV Video Music Award for Best Latin. On July 22, 2021, Eilish and Rosalía were nominated for the Premios Juventud for Girl Power for the song.

== Charts ==
=== Weekly charts ===
Weekly chart performance for "Lo Vas a Olvidar"
Chart (2021)	Peak position
Argentina Hot 100 (Billboard)	100
Australia (ARIA)	57
Austria (Ö3 Austria Top 40)	37
Belgium (Ultratop 50 Flanders)	43
Belgium (Ultratip Bubbling Under Wallonia)	20
Canada Hot 100 (Billboard)	50
Czech Republic Singles Digital (ČNS IFPI)	4
France (SNEP)	78
Germany (GfK)	63
Global 200 (Billboard)	18
Hungary (Single Top 40)	33
Hungary (Stream Top 40)	28
Iceland (Tónlistinn)	39
Ireland (IRMA)	23
Italy (FIMI)	74
Lithuania (AGATA)	6
Netherlands (Single Top 100)	50
New Zealand Hot Singles (RMNZ)	2
Norway (VG-lista)	22
Portugal (AFP)	12
Romania (Airplay 100)	87
Slovakia (Singles Digitál Top 100)	15
Sweden (Sverigetopplistan)	37
Switzerland (Schweizer Hitparade)	10
Spain (Promusicae)	15
UK Singles (Official Charts)	35
US Billboard Hot 100	62
US Hot Latin Songs (Billboard)	3
US Hot Rock & Alternative Songs (Billboard)	6

=== Year-end charts ===
Year-end chart performance for "Lo Vas a Olvidar"
Chart (2021)	Position
US Hot Rock & Alternative Songs (Billboard)	99

== Certifications ==
Certifications for "Lo Vas a Olvidar"
Region	Certification	Certified units/sales
Mexico (AMPROFON)	Gold	70,000^{‡}
Spain (Promusicae)	Gold	30,000^{‡}
^{‡} Sales+streaming figures based on certification alone.

== Release history ==
Release dates and formats for "Lo Vas a Olvidar"
Country	Date	Format	Label	Ref
Various	January 21, 2021	Digital download; streaming	Darkroom; Interscope	
Latin America	January 24, 2021	Contemporary hit radio	Darkroom; Interscope	
