= Euphoria (Original Score from the HBO Series) =

Soundtrack album by Labrinth
- Released: 4 October 2019
- Genres: Gospel; electronica; orchestral; melodic house
- Length: 63:13
- Labels: Milan Records; Sony Masterworks
- Producer: Labrinth

Labrinth chronology
Labrinth, Sia & Diplo Present... LSD (2019)	Euphoria (Original Score from the HBO Series) (2019)	Imagination & the Misfit Kid (2019)

Euphoria chronology
Euphoria (Original Score from the HBO Series) (2019)	Euphoria Season 1 (An HBO Original Series Soundtrack) (2021)

Euphoria (Original Score from the HBO Series) is British singer Labrinth's soundtrack album to the first season of the American teen drama television series Euphoria. It was released by Sony Masterworks and Milan Records on 4 October 2019. The album peaked at number 79 on the Billboard 200, Labrinth's first entry on the chart, and entered the top 50 in several countries.

== Background ==
The soundtrack is British musician Labrinth's first full length solo release since Electronic Earth (2012). Labrinth initially did not want to use his own voice for season 1, but Levinson persuaded him to after hearing his original demos.

== Composition ==
Consisting primarily of instrumental tracks, the album is genre blending, fusing gospel, electronica, orchestral music, and melodic house, with elements of soul, R&B, smooth jazz, jungle, and hip hop. Labrinth told Pitchfork about his approach to composing the score: "It was a dream come true to give wings and add magic to the different storylines. It was a collaborative effort among Sam Levinson, the crew and the cast – I only added texture to an already phenomenal show. I hope that anyone who listens to the music embraces feeling something." In October 2019, Labrinth told Rolling Stone about the mentality behind score: "When you look back to your teenage days, it feels semi-magical but semi-crazy and semi-psychotic. I wanted to make sure the music felt like those things."

== Commercial performance ==
"Still Don't Know My Name" became a sleeper hit in 2020. It eventually peaking at number 52 in Labrinth's native UK, and becoming certified Platinum by the Recording Industry Association of America, Labrinth's first solo certification in the country. "Formula", "Forever", "When I R.I.P.", and "Mount Everest", also charted in various countries, with the later song also appearing on Imagination & the Misfit Kid and Euphoria Season 2 Official Score (From the HBO Original Series).

== Reception ==
=== Critical response ===
IndieWire wrote that the score allows Labrinth to "become an unseen ethereal thread connecting all of the central figures in Euphoria." In a favourable review for Variety, A.D. Amorosi described the score as "the holy lilt of gospel, orchestral and electronic". The album was given a 9.4/10 rating by Medium.

=== Accolades ===
At the 72nd Primetime Creative Arts Emmy Awards, Labrinth was nominated for the Primetime Emmy Award for Outstanding Music Composition for a Series (Original Dramatic Score) for his work in the season 1 episode five "'03 Bonnie and Clyde". On 2 September 2020, Euphoria won the Ivor Novello Awards for Best Television Soundtrack.

== Track listing ==
All tracks are written by Labrinth, except tracks 18 and 19 written by Labrinth and Gustave Rudman Rambali.

No.	Title	Length
1.	"New Girl"	1:02
2.	"Formula"	1:31
3.	"Preparing for Call"	0:28
4.	"Forever"	3:22
5.	"Planning Date"	1:41
6.	"Nate Growing Up"	2:33
7.	"Home from Rehab"	0:43
8.	"We All Knew"	3:01
9.	"Say Goodnight"	0:43
10.	"Shy Guy"	1:25
11.	"Following Tyler"	1:28
12.	"Still Don't Know My Name"	2:33
13.	"Kat's Denial"	1:30
14.	"Slideshow"	0:56
15.	"Family Vacation"	0:22
16.	"Grapefruit Diet"	1:35
17.	"WTF Are We Talking For"	2:51
18.	"Euphoria Funfair"	10:07
19.	"The Lake"	3:45
20.	"Maddy's Story"	4:51
21.	"Demanding Excellence"	3:30
22.	"McKay & Cassie"	1:32
23.	"Gangster"	2:30
24.	"When I R.I.P."	2:54
25.	"Arriving at the Formal"	5:58
26.	"Virgin Piña Coladas"	0:22
27.	"Mount Everest"	2:39
Total length:		63:13

== Charts ==
=== Weekly charts ===
Weekly chart performance for Euphoria (Original Score from the HBO Series)
Chart (2019–2022)	Peak position
Australian Albums (ARIA)	29
Austrian Albums (Ö3 Austria)	18
Belgian Albums (Ultratop Flanders)	20
Belgian Albums (Ultratop Wallonia)	50
Canadian Albums (Billboard)	32
Danish Albums (Hitlisten)	6
Dutch Albums (Album Top 100)	36
Finnish Albums (Suomen virallinen lista)	22
French Albums (SNEP)	75
German Albums (Offizielle Top 100)	53
Italian Albums (FIMI)	77
Lithuanian Albums (AGATA)	12
New Zealand Albums (RMNZ)	16
Norwegian Albums (VG-lista)	4
Spanish Albums (Promusicae)	74
Swedish Albums (Sverigetopplistan)	45
Swiss Albums (Schweizer Hitparade)	57
UK Albums (Official Charts)	68
US Billboard 200	78
US Soundtrack Albums (Billboard)	2

=== Year-end charts ===
Year-end chart performance for Euphoria (Original Score from the HBO Series)
Chart (2022)	Position
Belgian Albums (Ultratop Flanders)	103
Belgian Albums (Ultratop Wallonia)	177
Danish Albums (Hitlisten)	68
Lithuanian Albums (AGATA)	63
US Soundtrack Albums (Billboard)	15

== Certifications ==
Certifications for Euphoria (Original Score from the HBO Series)
Region	Certification	Certified units/sales
Brazil (Pro-Música Brasil)	Platinum	40,000^{‡}
Denmark (IFPI Danmark)	Platinum	20,000^{‡}
France (SNEP)	Gold	50,000^{‡}
Germany (BVMI)	Gold	100,000^{‡}
Italy (FIMI)	Gold	25,000^{‡}
New Zealand (RMNZ)	Platinum	15,000^{‡}
Poland (ZPAV)	Platinum	20,000^{‡}
United Kingdom (BPI)	Silver	60,000^{‡}
United States (RIAA)	Gold	500,000^{‡}
^{‡} Sales+streaming figures based on certification alone.

== Release history ==
Release dates and formats for Euphoria (Original Score from the HBO Series)
Region	Date	Format	Label	Reference
Various	4 October 2019	Digital download; streaming	Sony Masterworks; Milan Records	
Various	10 January 2020	LP	Sony Masterworks; Milan Records	
