= Master Shortie =

British MC

- Born: Theo Jerome Kerlin; 7 May 1989 (age 36)
- Origin: Mitcham, London, England
- Genres: Alternative hip hop, electronica, indie rock, UK Garage, R&B
- Occupations: Rapper, singer-songwriter, record producer, ceo
- Years active: 2008–Present
- Labels: Odd One Out, Hitz Committee, RCA, Sony
- Website: Official Site

Theo Jerome Kerlin (born 7 May 1989) is a British MC who is credited by his stage name Master Shortie. He is also a singer and has established his own record label, Odd One Out. He was included in the Sound of 2009 poll.

== Early life ==
Kerlin is from Mitcham in South London. His father ran an east London jazz bar throughout his childhood, which led him to listen to many genres of music, encouraging him to start rapping at the age of 12.

== Career ==
=== Early career ===
He started off at The Kidz in the Biz Academy in South East London. After a short stint at the BRIT School, at the age of 14, he soon dropped out, claiming "it wasn't me, it didn't suit me". At 16, Kerlin enrolled on a BTEC course at Nescot, studying Music Technology. He then started recording and producing his own adolescent hip-hop songs with producers and an underground reggae singer called Sparky.

Kerlin also appeared as Simba in a West End production of the Lion King.

=== Debut (2005–2007) ===
In 2005, Kerlin started to support American urban acts such as ATL at the Hackney Empire, the Scala and Shepherd's Bush Empire.

He was asked to support Hadouken! on their UK tour, as he shares the same management company as them.

=== A.D.H.D and Sound Of.. Poll (2008–present) ===
In September 2008, Theo Kerlin released his debut single, "Rope Chain", alongside a music video which gathered popularity on YouTube. In December 2008, Master Shortie was enlisted in the Sound of 2009 poll, whereby he was tipped to be the one to look out for in 2009. He stated that the hype was helping him "work twice as hard". In January 2009, Master Shortie stated that his new album, A.D.H.D, was slated to release in the summer of 2009. Citing that the reason for the album name is that "my music is just so crazy and it's so all over the place and it craves attention." In April, Master Shortie released his third single, "Dance Like a White Boy", which was shortly followed by the aforementioned album. The track "Swagger Chick" features Vanessa White from girlgroup The Saturdays.

In the spring of 2009 Master Shortie supported Basement Jaxx on their UK tour.

Master Shortie played at the 2009 Wireless Festival on the 4th of July. In October 2009 he supported Lil Wayne at his three Hammersmith Apollo dates in London.

In March 2010, Master Shortie announced that he and his record label, Odd One Out, had signed to Hitz Committee, RCA (formerly Jive) and Sony.

In 2012, Master Shortie's mixtape Studying Abroad was released. The record featured artists such as Ed Sheeran, Rizzle Kicks and Chiddy.

Through October 2013 Master Shortie worked on his latest piece. He announced over Twitter that it would be named Nobody Taught Me and also shared the EP's artwork. On 4 November 2013, he released the first song of the album, "Where I'm At". It debuted on the music sharing site SoundCloud, where he had had a presence for over a year.

== Discography ==
=== Studio albums ===
- A.D.H.D. (2009)

=== Extended plays ===
- Nobody Taught Me (2013)

=== Mixtapes ===
- MistaJam Presents... Odd One Out Mashtape (2009)
- Studying Abroad (2012)

=== Singles ===
- "Rope Chain" (2008)
- "Dead End" (feat. Labrinth) (2008)
- "Dance Like a White Boy" (2009)
- "Dead End" (feat. Labrinth) (re-release) (2009)
- "Bringing It Back" (2009)
- "Right Time" (2010)
- "Daydream" (feat. Polluted Mindz) (2010)
- "Social Groups" (2011)

=== Remixes ===
- "Bringing It Back" (Vindata remix)
- "Dead End" (Don Diablo remix)
