= Misbehaving (song) =

Single by Labrinth

from the album Imagination & the Misfit Kid
- Released: 15 September 2017
- Length: 3:48
- Label: Syco
- Songwriter: Timothy Mckenzie
- Producers: Labrinth; Nathaniel Ledwidge

Labrinth singles chronology
"To Be Human" (2017)	"Misbehaving" (2017)	"Same Team" (2018)

"Misbehaving" is a song by English singer-songwriter Labrinth. It was written and produced by Labrinth, with additional production from Nathaniel Ledwidge. The song was released through Syco Music on 15 September 2017. It was featured in an Apple Watch Series 3 commercial prior to its release.

== Background ==
The song was adopted in an Apple Watch Series 3 commercial, titled "Roll", which was debuted during an Apple event on 12 September 2017. However, viewers were unable to identify the song, as audio-recognizing apps, including Shazam, failed to recognize the song. After a series of speculation on social media, Labrinth revealed that it is his song, as well as one of those from his forthcoming album. Labrinth told Billboard: "I feel like I have music to share with the world so I'm so ready to make it to that international level so that's pretty much where I'm at right now, and it feels like all the opportunities that are lined up are based on that. So I'm just mega-excited about sharing what I've been creating for such a while."

On the album, an alternate version of the song appears, titled "Misbehaving - The Misfit Version ".

== Critical reception ==
Anna Tingley of Billboard felt the song's "heavy, upbeat, synthesized beat" and "Labrinth's crafty lyrics" fits the commercial, as it narrates "the reckless behavior of the commercial's characters". She predicts that being featured in an Apple commercial "may prove a formative step that launches him into international stardom". Jon Pareles of The New York Times called it "a zany four-minute romp", praising Labrinth for combining funk, soul, reggae, trap and electro timelessly in the song.

== Credits and personnel ==
Credits adapted from Tidal.

- Labrinth – songwriting, production, engineering, keyboard, bass guitar, drums, guitar, piano
- Nathaniel Ledwidge – production
- Robbie Nelson – mixing engineering
- Emily Lazar – mastering engineering
- Alex Maynard – trumpet
- Rory Simmons – trumpet
- Nik Carter – saxophone
- Steven Fuller – trombone
