= All for Us =

2019 single by Labrinth

Single by Labrinth

from the album Imagination & the Misfit Kid and Euphoria Season 1 (An HBO Original Series Soundtrack)
- Released: 30 June 2019
- Genre: Contemporary R&B; electronic; Gospel
- Length: 3:32; 3:13 (with Zendaya)
- Label: Syco
- Songwriter: Timothy McKenzie
- Producer: Labrinth

Labrinth singles chronology
"Mount Everest" (2019)	"All for Us" (2019)	"Something's Got to Give" (2019)

Zendaya singles chronology
"Rewrite the Stars" (2018)	"All for Us" (2019)	"I'm Tired" (2022)

Music video
- "All for Us" on YouTube

"All for Us" is a song by British singer Labrinth, released by Syco Music on 30 June 2019 as a single from his album Imagination & the Misfit Kid. A version of the song with vocals from Zendaya as Rue Bennett was featured in the first season of the American teen drama television series Euphoria. On 4 August 2019, it was released as the lead single to Euphoria Season 1 (An HBO Original Series Soundtrack), and won Labrinth Outstanding Original Music and Lyrics at the 72nd Primetime Creative Arts Emmy Awards.

== Background ==
British musician Labrinth's second studio album Imagination & the Misfit Kid featured the song as a single which was released on 30 June 2019 by Syco Music. Labrinth went on to become the composer to the first season of the American teen drama television series Euphoria. A reworked version of "All for Us" is hinted at throughout the season before being sung fully as in a musical piece at the end of the finale "And Salt the Earth Behind You". American actress and singer Zendaya plays Euphoria protagonist Rue Bennett, and has vocals on the new version in character as Rue. The new song was released as the lead single to Euphoria Season 1 (An HBO Original Series Soundtrack) on 4 August 2019.

== Composition ==
Labrinth wrote "All for Us", which comprises "vocal choruses and gritty synths to create a dreadful atmosphere that's quickly contrasted with a lovesick chorus". It depicts him as "determined to make things work between him and his partner" as he "reflects on his parents' poor marriage". The version with Zendaya has been described as "dark and epic, with a buzzing bass and chanting vocals". It's fits into the genres of Gospel, Contemporary R&B, and electronic.

== Commercial performance ==
At both Coachella 2023, and 2026, Labrinth and Zendaya performed the song.

== Reception ==
=== Critical response ===
Billboard described the song as "dark and epic, with a buzzing bass and chanting vocals". Vox praised song's incorporation in the season 1 finale of Euphoria: "[it] leaps into a new method of storytelling for the show, one that marries its sincerity with its surreal visual vocabulary to enter into a new emotional mode."

=== Accolades ===
At the 72nd Primetime Creative Arts Emmy Awards, Labrinth won the Primetime Emmy Award for Outstanding Original Music and Lyrics for the song. Labrinth and Zendaya also won the Hollywood Music in Media Award for Best Original Song in a TV Show/Limited Series in 2021.

== Charts ==
Chart performance for "All for Us"
Chart (2019–2022)	Peak position
Australia (ARIA)	49
Global 200 (Billboard)	58
Greece International (IFPI)	9
Iceland (Tónlistinn)	28
Ireland (IRMA)	24
Lithuania (AGATA)	40
Portugal (AFP)	66
Sweden Heatseeker (Sverigetopplistan)	9
UK Singles (Official Charts)	52
US Digital Song Sales (Billboard)	40

== Certifications ==
Certifications for "All for Us"
Region	Certification	Certified units/sales
Brazil (Pro-Música Brasil)	Diamond	160,000^{‡}
Denmark (IFPI Danmark)	Gold	45,000^{‡}
France (SNEP)	Platinum	200,000^{‡}
Mexico (AMPROFON)	Platinum+Gold	90,000^{‡}
New Zealand (RMNZ)	Platinum	30,000^{‡}
Poland (ZPAV)	Platinum	50,000^{‡}
Spain (Promusicae)	Gold	30,000^{‡}
United Kingdom (BPI)	Gold	400,000^{‡}
United States (RIAA)	Gold	500,000^{‡}
Streaming
Greece (IFPI Greece)	Gold	1,000,000^{†}
^{‡} Sales+streaming figures based on certification alone.^{†} Streaming-only figures based on certification alone.
