= Express Yourself (Labrinth song) =

Single by Labrinth

from the album Electronic Earth
- Released: 7 May 2012
- Recorded: 2011
- Genre: Electro-funk; R&B
- Length: 4:03
- Label: Syco
- Songwriters: Timothy McKenzie; Charles Wright
- Producers: Labrinth; Mike Spencer

Labrinth singles chronology
"Last Time" (2012)	"Express Yourself" (2012)	"Treatment" (2012)

"Express Yourself" is a song by English musician Labrinth. Written by Labrinth and Charles Wright, it was released as the fourth single from his debut studio album, Electronic Earth on 7 May 2012. It interpolates "Express Yourself" by Charles Wright & the Watts 103rd Street Rhythm Band, which was the same song sampled by N.W.A. in their 1988 song of the same name, and the famous drum break from James Brown's "Funky Drummer".

Labrinth premiered the song live during the results show of the fourth live-semi final of the sixth series of Britain's Got Talent, on 9 May 2012. Maxumi Magazine commented that the track demonstrates "Labrinth's Kanye West like ability to make cracking use of samples that pay homage to their originators whilst forming the basis for inventive new tunes". Don Diablo remixed the single, due to be released as part of the digital EP, but he later revealed via his SoundCloud that the remix missed the deadline and therefore was not included on the iTunes package. This song is featured in a Windows 8 commercial, as well as a SoFi commercial.

== Reception ==
Digitalspy.co.uk reviewed the single saying "From the gospel-inspired chorus in "Let the Sun Shine" to the hi-wired grime beats on "Earthquake", Labrinth is quickly earning himself a reputation as the chameleon of the pop world. Better yet, it appears he still has plenty more ideas tucked up his sleeve, having told us he wants to put out eight singles from his debut LP Electronic Earth. So what of release number four? The singer has tried his hand at soul, interweaving singing legend Charles Wright's melody with his own contemporary and distinctly personal lyrics. "I don't make the papers, I'm far from JLS/Ain't got the X Factor, I'm not what they expect," he admits over funk-driven guitars, before the chorus of trumpets and sparkly synths shower down. It's a suit that fits him remarkably well, though given his history, we won't allow ourselves to enjoy it too much."

== Music video ==
Several images of the music video were posted to Labrinth's official Facebook page prior to the release of the video. The official video was shot by French directorial duo Jonas & François. It was released on 16 May 2012, at a total length of three minutes and thirty-two seconds. The video depicts Labrinth parodying such programmes as The Fresh Prince of Bel Air, where he brings back the rotating throne from the sitcom's opening titles, Ice Age and The Simpsons, recreating scenes from the show's opening sequences and also he is seen performing on a floor with comic book artworks covering it. The video uses the single remix of "Express Yourself", rather than the album version.

== Track listing ==
Digital EP
No.	Title	Length
1.	"Express Yourself" (Radio Edit)	3:18
2.	"Express Yourself" (Lazy Jay Remix)	5:48
3.	"Express Yourself" (Oliver Twizt Remix)	4:28
4.	"Express Yourself" (Rudimental Remix)	3:47
5.	"Express Yourself" (Wideboys Remix)	5:18

== Charts ==
=== Weekly charts ===
Chart (2012)	Peak position
Belgium (Ultratop 50 Flanders)	22
France (SNEP)	160
Germany (GfK)	55
Ireland (IRMA)	22
Scottish Singles Sales (Official Charts)	17
UK Singles (Official Charts)	12

=== Year-end charts ===
Chart (2012)	Peak position
UK Singles Chart	86

== Certifications ==
Certifications and sales for "Express Yourself"
Region	Certification	Certified units/sales
United Kingdom (BPI)	Gold	400,000^{‡}
^{‡} Sales+streaming figures based on certification alone.

== Release history ==
Region	Date	Label	Format	Ref.
United Kingdom	4 June 2012	Syco	Digital download	

== In popular culture ==
- Featured in a 2020 commercial for Social Finance, Inc., (commonly known as SoFi).
- Used during the end credits of Noel Clarke's 2012 British sports film Fast Girls
