= A.D.H.D. (Master Shortie album) =

A.D.H.D

Studio album by Master Shortie
- Released: 27 July 2009
- Recorded: 2008–2009
- Genres: Hip hop, dance, grindie, indie rock, electronic
- Label: Odd One Out
- Producers: Theo Kerlin, Labrinth

Singles from A.D.H.D.
- 1. "Rope Chain" Released: 1 September 2008; 2. "Dead End"; 3. "Dance Like a White Boy" Released: 22 April 2009

Professional ratings
Review scores
Source	Rating
Evening Standard	3/5 stars
The Guardian	3/5 stars
The London Paper	3/5 stars
Planet Sound	6/10 stars
The Times	2/5 stars
Vice	0/10 stars

A.D.H.D is the debut album by English hip hop artist Master Shortie. The album was released on 27 July 2009.

== Track listing ==
1. "ADHD (Intro)"
2. "Bringing It Back"
3. "Nothing to Be Scared of (Prince Charming)"
4. "Under the Moon" (featuring Kase)
5. "Swagger Chick" (featuring Vanessa White)
6. "Have It Your Way"
7. "Groupie Love"
8. "Rope Chain" (featuring Kase)
9. "Right Time"
10. "London Town" (co-written by Zakaria Sawalha)
11. "Why (Interlude)"
12. "Dance Like a White Boy"
13. "Dead End"

=== Bonus tracks ===
14. "Bringing It Back" (Live at RAK)
