= Let It Go (Devlin song) =

Single by Devlin featuring Labrinth

from the album Bud, Sweat and Beers
- Released: 3 January 2011
- Recorded: 2010
- Genre: British hip hop
- Length: 3:40
- Label: Universal Music Group; Island Records
- Songwriter(s): Matthew Norman; James Devlin
- Producer(s): Labrinth

Devlin singles chronology
"Game Over" (2010)	"Let It Go" (2011)	"Young Guns" (2011)

Labrinth singles chronology
"Let the Sun Shine" (2010)	"Let It Go" (2011)	"Earthquake" (2011)

"Let It Go" is a song by British rapper Devlin. The single which was released in the United Kingdom on 3 January 2011 serves as the third and final single from the album Bud, Sweat and Beers (2010). The single features vocals from producer Labrinth and has thus far charted at number 59 on the UK Singles Chart.

== Promotion ==
During January 2011, "Let It Go" was added to BBC Radio 1's Playlist. Having first appeared on the week of the 12 January on the B Playlist, the single was soon moved up to the A Playlist, where it spent two consecutive weeks. On 1 February, Devlin appeared at Maida Vale Studios to perform on the Live Lounge, a Radio 1 division that involves artists performing acoustic versions of their own songs, as well as a cover of another artists' song. Devlin, alongside rising star Ed Sheeran, performed a version of "Let It Go", which was followed by a cover version of the Chase & Status single "Blind Faith" which also featured Liam Bailey.

== Track listing ==
Digital download
No.	Title	Length
1.	"Let It Go" (Joker Remix)	3:54
2.	"Let It Go" (Da Lab Gally Mix)	4:04
3.	"Let It Go" (Lewi White Remix)	3:31

== Chart performance ==
"Let It Go" debuted on the UK Singles Chart at number 93 on 12 December 2010. The single then re-entered the chart on 26 December at number 86 and then re-entered a third time on 9 January 2011. After three non-consecutive weeks on the chart, "Let It Go" climbed 29 places to number 65 on 15 January, falling 5 places to number 70 the week after. On 30 January, the single climbed 11 places to its current peak of number 59.

Chart (2011)	Peak position
UK Hip Hop/R&B (OCC)	19
UK Singles (OCC)	59

== Release history ==
Region	Date	Format
United Kingdom	2 January 2011	Digital download
United Kingdom	3 January 2011	CD single
