= Treatment (song) =

Single by Labrinth featuring Etta Bond

from the album Electronic Earth
- Released: 9 September 2012
- Genre: Electronica; R&B
- Length: 4:30
- Label: Syco
- Songwriter(s): Timothy McKenzie; Carl Falk; Rami Yacoub
- Producer(s): Labrinth; Da Digglar

Labrinth featuring Etta Bond singles chronology
| "Express Yourself" (2012) | "Treatment" (2012) | "Beneath Your Beautiful" (2012) |

Etta Bond singles chronology
| "Forgiveness" (2011) | "Treatment" (2012) | "Playing with Fire" (2012) |

"Treatment" is a song by English musician Labrinth. Written by Labrinth, Carl Falk and Rami Yacoub, it was released as the fifth single from his debut album Electronic Earth on 9 September 2012. The album version of the song features vocals from Etta Bond.

== Background ==
Speaking about "Treatment" in an interview with Digital Spy, Labrinth has stated that "It's a record that, for me, everybody's been through that moment where love sends them a little bit crazy and I thought I needed to write about it".

== Music video ==
The music video was uploaded to Labrinth's VEVO account on YouTube on 8 August 2012. The video was shot in a black and white perspective and is set in Labrinth's dressing room, showing his emotions of how love sends him crazy.

== Track listing ==
Digital EP
| No. | Title | Length |
|---|---|---|
| 1. | "Treatment" | 4:30 |
| 2. | "Treatment" (Kat Krazy Remix) | 4:57 |
| 3. | "Treatment" (Julian Jordan Remix) | 6:04 |
| 4. | "Treatment" (Eyes vs. Oliver Leonard Remix) | 5:05 |

== Charts ==
| Chart (2012) | Peak position |
|---|---|
| Australia (ARIA) | 33 |
| Ireland (IRMA) | 39 |
| Slovakia (Rádio Top 100) | 56 |
| UK Hip Hop/R&B (OCC) | 12 |
| UK Singles (Official Charts Company) | 55 |

== Release history ==
- Germany

September 7, 2012 (Digital download)

- UK

September 7, 2012 (Digital download)
