= Imagination & the Misfit Kid =

Studio album by Labrinth
- Released: 22 November 2019
- Length: 38:49
- Label: Syco; RCA
- Producer: Labrinth; Nathaniel Ledwidge; Ilya; Darren Poole

Labrinth chronology
Euphoria (Original Score from the HBO Series) (2019)	Imagination & the Misfit Kid (2019)	Euphoria Season 2 Official Score (From the HBO Original Series) (2022)

Singles from Imagination & the Misfit Kid
- 1. "Miracle" Released: 7 June 2019; 2. "Mount Everest" Released: 21 June 2019; 3. "All for Us" Released: 4 August 2019; 4. "Something's Got to Give" Released: 16 August 2019; 5. "Where the Wild Things" Released: 31 October 2019; 6. "Like a Movie" Released: 8 November 2019; 7. "Oblivion" Released: 22 November 2019

Imagination & the Misfit Kid is the second studio album by English singer-songwriter Labrinth, released on 22 November 2019. The album was recorded in London and New York City and features vocals by singers Sia and Zendaya. While the album did not chart upon release, it entered the charts in 2022 when the single "Mount Everest" was featured in Euphoria.

== Background ==
In an October 2019 interview, Labrinth described Imagination & the Misfit Kid as a "concept collection about a child who sells his imagination to a businessman in exchange for success", while the album announcement called it an "adventure is laced together by the story of a journey through art, commerce, and imagination." The album was released for digital download and streaming on 22 November 2019, with the LP released on 28 February 2020.

"Misbehaving" was released as the first single from the record on 15 September 2017. "Miracle", "Mount Everest", "All for Us", "Something's Got To Give", "Where the Wild Things" and "Like a Movie" were released as singles prior to the album release in 2019. "Oblivion" served as the album's eighth single. Imagination & the Misfit Kid was written and produced entirely by Labrinth, with additional writing by Darren Poole, Ilya Salmanzadeh, Ammar Malik, Jason Evigan and Cass Lowe on select tracks. Labrinth wrote "Oblivion" with featured artist Sia, and the song was later re-recorded and featured on her 2021 album Music – Songs from and Inspired by the Motion Picture.

The album's music is influenced by hip-hop, electro, gospel, video game music, and the sounds of the '70s and '80s.

== Critical reception ==
Professional ratings
Review scores
Source	Rating
Clash	7/10
The Observer	1/5 stars

In her review for Clash, Narzra Ahmed stated that Labrinth has "plenty of fun with his sound" and scored the album seven out of ten. Alex Green of the Belfast Telegraph, who positively reviewed the album, stated that it was "simultaneously more experimental and more jam-packed with potential pop hits than his debut", while Damien Morris of The Observer gave the album one out of five stars, opining that Labrinth's "inventive music is decent in tiny bursts, but wearying at album length". The track "Where the Wild Things" was included on Time magazine's five best songs of the week of 1 November 2019. The list's curator, Raisa Bruner praised the song as "consistently compelling".

== Appearances in other media ==
The song "All for Us" was performed by American singer Zendaya in the first season finale of the drama series Euphoria. It garnered the Primetime Emmy Award for Outstanding Original Music And Lyrics in 2020.

The song "Mount Everest" was added to the soundtrack of the video game "UFC 4" "Like a Movie" appears in Apple's iPhone 13 Pro 'Hollywood in your pocket' TV ad campaign, while "Dotted Line / Juju Man" is featured in the Netflix fantasy comedy film We Have a Ghost (2023).

== Track listing ==
Imagination & the Misfit Kid track listing
No.	Title	Writer(s)	Producer(s)	Length
1.	"Imagination"	Timothy McKenzie	Labrinth	1:30
2.	"Misbehaving" (The Misfit version)	McKenzie	Labrinth; Nathaniel Ledwidge	3:13
3.	"Miracle"	McKenzie; Darren Poole; Ilya Salmanzadeh	Labrinth; Ilya	3:49
4.	"Juju Woman"	McKenzie	Labrinth	0:48
5.	"Dotted Line / Juju Man"	McKenzie	Labrinth	3:02
6.	"All for Us" (with Zendaya)	McKenzie	Labrinth	3:11
7.	"The Producer"	McKenzie	Labrinth	2:43
8.	"Something's Got to Give"	McKenzie; Poole; Ammar Malik; Jason Evigan	Labrinth; Poole^{[a]}; Ledwidge^{[a]}	3:50
9.	"I'm Blessed"	McKenzie	Labrinth	0:50
10.	"Like a Movie"	McKenzie	Labrinth	2:20
11.	"Sexy MF"	McKenzie	Labrinth; Ledwidge	2:58
12.	"Where the Wild Things"	McKenzie; Cass Lowe	Labrinth	3:18
13.	"Mount Everest"	McKenzie	Labrinth	2:37
14.	"The Finale"	McKenzie	Labrinth	0:27
15.	"Oblivion" (featuring Sia)	McKenzie; Sia Furler	Labrinth; Ilya	4:13
Total length:				38:49

== Charts ==
Chart performance for Imagination & the Misfit Kid
Chart (2022)	Peak position
Canadian Albums (Billboard)	77
French Albums (SNEP)	194
Lithuanian Albums (AGATA)	27
Norwegian Albums (VG-lista)	32
US Billboard 200	151

== Certifications ==
Certifications for Imagination & the Misfit Kid
Region	Certification	Certified units/sales
Brazil (Pro-Música Brasil)	Gold	20,000^{‡}
Poland (ZPAV)	Gold	10,000^{‡}
^{‡} Sales+streaming figures based on certification alone.

== Release history ==
Release history and formats for Imagination & the Misfit Kid
Region	Date	Format(s)	Label	Ref.
Various	22 November 2019	Digital download; streaming	Syco	
Europe	28 February 2020	LP	Syco	
