= Last Time (Labrinth song) =

2012 single by Labrinth

Single by Labrinth

from the album Electronic Earth
- Released: 16 March 2012
- Genre: Electro-R&B
- Length: 4:24
- Label: Syco
- Songwriter(s): Labrinth; Marc Williams
- Producer(s): Labrinth

Labrinth singles chronology
"Teardrop" (2011)	"Last Time" (2012)	"Express Yourself" (2012)

Music video
- Labrinth - Last Time on YouTube

"Last Time" is a song by English musician Labrinth. Written by Labrinth and manager Marc Williams, it was released as the third single from the musician's debut album Electronic Earth on 16 March 2012.

== Background ==
Before its release, "Last Time" was performed live by Labrinth on the BBC Radio 1Xtra Live tour in 2011. Labrinth revealed on Twitter that the song would be his third single, announcing on 25 January 2012: "My new single is called Last Time out on March 11th." The full track was premiered on UK radio on 30 January at 8:00 GMT, and the song was later uploaded on Labrinth's YouTube account.

== Style and composition ==
Labrinth claims that he was "gravitated" to the sound of "Last Time" by his love of science fiction, and points out that song is influenced by European electronic artists such as Daft Punk and Kraftwerk, describing it as his "own perception" of their sounds. When revealing the song, the musician and producer claimed that it "shows another side to what I'm about", pointing out that "It's quite electronic, but when you really listen to the detail of the music, you can understand that it's really musical".

== Critical reception ==
Lewis Corner of Digital Spy described the song as "immaculately produced, slickly executed and ... fresh and fizzy".

== Music video ==
The music video for "Last Time" was released on 24 February 2012, and was directed by Colin Tilley. The video has been described as "intergalactic", and features Labrinth "travelling the globe with a blue alien" and other phenomena. Labrinth said in the pre-video that he wanted to try a sci-fi video.

== Track listing ==
iTunes digital download
No.	Title	Length
1.	"Last Time"	4:24
2.	"Last Time" (Knife Party Remix)	5:14
3.	"Last Time" (Gareth Emery Remix)	5:47
4.	"Last Time" (Monsta Remix)	6:36
Total length:		22:01

== Charts ==
Chart (2012)	Peak position
Australia (ARIA)	40
Czech Republic (Rádio – Top 100)	58
Ireland (IRMA)	14
Scotland (OCC)	4
UK Hip Hop/R&B (OCC)	1
UK Singles (OCC)	4
UK Official Streaming Chart Top 100	50

== Certifications ==
Region	Certification	Certified units/sales
United Kingdom (BPI)	Silver	200,000^{‡}
^{‡} Sales+streaming figures based on certification alone.

== Release history ==
Region	Date	Label	Format	Ref.
United Kingdom	16 March 2012	Syco	Digital download	
Germany	16 March 2012	Syco	Digital download	
