= Electronic Earth =

2012 studio album by Labrinth

Studio album by Labrinth
- Released: 2 April 2012
- Recorded: 2010–2012
- Studios: Milmark Studios, London
- Genres: Hip-hop; electronica; dubstep; drum and bass; grime; R&B
- Length: 43:23
- Label: Syco
- Producers: Labrinth; Da Digglar

Labrinth chronology
Electronic Earth (2012)	Atomic (2013)

Singles from Electronic Earth
- 1. "Let the Sun Shine" Released: 27 September 2010; 2. "Earthquake" Released: 23 October 2011; 3. "Last Time" Released: 16 March 2012; 4. "Express Yourself" Released: 7 May 2012; 5. "Treatment" Released: 9 September 2012; 6. "Beneath Your Beautiful" Released: 18 October 2012

Electronic Earth is the debut studio album by English recording artist Labrinth released on 2 April 2012, via Syco Music. The album peaked at number 2 on the UK Albums Chart.

== Background ==
The album was released on 2 April 2012, by Simon Cowell's Syco Music. The album was largely self-produced by Labrinth, and was recorded over the period of two years. The album features guest appearances from Tinie Tempah, Emeli Sandé, Etta Bond, Busta Rhymes, Kano, Wretch 32, Devlin and Tinchy Stryder, as well as remixes by Joey Negro, the Wideboys, Knife Party and R3hab. The album's release was preceded by the release of three singles – "Let the Sun Shine", which was released on 27 September 2010, reaching a peak position of number three on the UK Singles Chart; "Earthquake", which was released on 23 October 2011, reaching a peak position of number two; and "Last Time", which was released on 18 March 2012.

The title and release date of Electronic Earth were confirmed via Labrinth's official Twitter account on 19 December 2011. The official artwork was unveiled in February 2012. The album was originally due for release on 12 March, but was later pushed back, being released on 2 April 2012. The album was set for release in the United States on 11 December 2012, in a joint deal between Syco Music and Capitol Records. Three extra tracks were added to the release for the American market – Labrinth's collaboration with Devlin, "Let it Go"; a special version of Tinie Tempah's smash hit single "Written in the Stars" featuring both Labrinth and original collaborator Eric Turner; and "Teardrop", a collaboration with a number of fellow urban artists, produced as the official single for the Children in Need telethon of 2011.

== Title ==
Speaking to Blues & Soul in January 2012, Labrinth stated: "Basically 'Electronic Earth' as a title represents musically where I'm heading to as an artist. In that I wanna be able to make both acoustic and electronic music side-by-side. You know, on one side you have artists like Adele who's very much on an acoustic vibe, and then on the other you have like maybe Justice who are a kind of electro-house band. And to me, what I'm about as a musician is joining those two worlds TOGETHER... So yeah, in that way 'Electronic Earth' does truly represent me as both an artist AND a producer."

== Critical reception ==
Professional ratings
Aggregate scores
Source	Rating
AnyDecentMusic?	5.4/10
Metacritic	55/100
Review scores
Source	Rating
4Music	4/5 stars
BBC Music	(favourable)
Digital Spy	4/5 stars
The Guardian	3/5 stars
The Independent	3/5 stars
NME	(4/10)

Electronic Earth has received mixed responses. At Metacritic, which assigns a normalized rating out of 100 for reviews from mainstream critics, the album received an average score of 55, based on 8 reviews, which indicates "Mixed or Average reviews". Lewis Corner of music blog Digital Spy gave the album four out of five stars, pointing out that while "Labrinth's lyrics are far from groundbreaking", [he's] "the one artist Cowell has on his label who has the X Factor in abundance". Reviewing the album for The Guardian, Alexis Petridis gave Electronic Earth 3 out of 5 stars, claiming that "there are moments when Electronic Earth is nearly as audacious as Labrinth thinks it is". Killian Fox for the publication's sister newspaper The Observer claims that on Electronic Earth Labrinth "has high ambitions but falls disappointingly short". The album debuted at number two on the UK Albums Chart, selling 32,281 copies in its first week.

== Singles ==
- "Let the Sun Shine" was released in September 2010 as the lead single from the album. It peaked at number 3 on the UK Singles Chart, becoming the third most successful single from the album.
- "Earthquake" was released in October 2011 as the second single from the album. It peaked at number 2 on the UK Singles Chart, becoming the second most successful single from the album. The track features vocals from rapper Tinie Tempah.
- "Last Time" was released in March 2012 as the third single from the album. It peaked at number 4 on the UK Singles Chart, becoming the fourth most successful single from the album.
- "Express Yourself" was released in May 2012 as the fourth single from the album. It peaked at number 12 on the UK Singles Chart, the first track from the album to miss the Top 10.
- "Treatment" was released in August 2012 as the fifth single from the album. It peaked at number 55 on the UK Singles Chart, becoming the worst performing single from the album, and the first to miss the Top 40.
- "Beneath Your Beautiful" was released in October 2012 as the sixth single from the album. It peaked at number 1 on the UK Singles Chart, earning Labrinth his first ever number-one single, and becoming the highest performing single from the album. The track features vocals from singer-songwriter Emeli Sandé.

=== Promotional songs ===
- "Climb on Board" was planned to be released on 30 March 2012 as the fourth single of the album. The release was postponed, ultimately cancelled, and eventually replaced with "Express Yourself". However, the song was given a release as a free Amazon.com download prior to album release.
- "Up in Flames" (featuring Devlin and Tinchy Stryder), one of the two original bonus tracks in the deluxe version of the album (along with "T.O.P."), was released as a free download through his website and his SoundCloud page. Labrinth has also published a behind-the-scenes video to YouTube through his channel of the song being recording. The video itself simulates a VHS tape recording with many glitches.

== Track listing ==
Electronic Earth
No.	Title	Writer(s)	Producer(s)	Length
1.	"Climb on Board"	Timothy McKenzie, Marc Williams	Labrinth; Da Digglar	3:58
2.	"Earthquake" (featuring Tinie Tempah)	McKenzie; Williams; Patrick Okogwu	Labrinth	3:31
3.	"Last Time"	McKenzie; Williams	Labrinth; Da Digglar	4:23
4.	"Treatment" (featuring Etta Bond)	McKenzie; Rami Yacoub; Carl Falk	Labrinth; Da Digglar	4:30
5.	"Express Yourself"	McKenzie; Charles Wright; James Brown	Labrinth	4:03
6.	"Let the Sun Shine"	McKenzie	Labrinth; Da Digglar	2:59
7.	"Beneath Your Beautiful" (featuring Emeli Sandé)	McKenzie; Emeli Sandé; Mike Posner	Labrinth; Da Digglar	4:31
8.	"Sundown"	McKenzie; Williams; Joni Mitchell	Labrinth; Da Digglar	5:06
9.	"Sweet Riot"	McKenzie	Labrinth	5:02
10.	"Vultures"	McKenzie; Claude Kelly; Wayne Hector	Labrinth; Da Digglar	4:17
Total length:				43:23

Electronic Earth – Digital deluxe edition bonus tracks
No.	Title	Writer(s)	Producer(s)	Length
11.	"Earthquake" (All Stars Remix) (featuring Tinie Tempah, Kano, Wretch 32 and Busta Rhymes)	McKenzie; Williams; Okogwu; Kane Robinson; Jermaine Scott; Trevor Smith	Labrinth	5:14
12.	"T.O.P."	McKenzie	Labrinth; Da Digglar	3:18
13.	"Up in Flames" (featuring Devlin and Tinchy Stryder)	McKenzie; James Devlin; Kwasi Danquah	Labrinth	4:05
14.	"Last Time" (Knife Party Remix)	McKenzie, Williams	Labrinth; Da Digglar; Knife Party	5:16
15.	"Earthquake" (Noisia Remix) (featuring Tinie Tempah)	McKenzie; Williams; Okogwu	Labrinth; Noisia	6:29

Electronic Earth – Deluxe edition bonus disc
No.	Title	Writer(s)	Producer(s)	Length
1.	"Earthquake" (All Stars Remix) (featuring Tinie Tempah, Kano, Wretch 32 and Busta Rhymes)	McKenzie; Williams; Okogwu; Robinson; Scott; Smith	Labrinth	5:14
2.	"T.O.P."	McKenzie	Labrinth; Da Digglar	3:18
3.	"Up in Flames" (featuring Devlin and Tinchy Stryder)	McKenzie; James Devlin; Kwasi Danquah	Labrinth	4:05
4.	"Earthquake" (Noisia Remix) (featuring Tinie Tempah)	McKenzie; Williams; Okogwu	Labrinth; Noisia	6:29
5.	"Earthquake" (Benny Benassi Remix) (featuring Tinie Tempah)	McKenzie; Williams; Okogwu	Labrinth; Benny Benassi	5:00
6.	"Let the Sun Shine" (Joey Negro Radio Mix)	McKenzie	Labrinth; Da Digglar; Joey Negro	3:13
7.	"Let the Sun Shine" (Wideboys Remix)	McKenzie	Labrinth; Da Digglar; Wideboys
8.	"Last Time" (Knife Party Remix)	McKenzie; Williams	Labrinth; Da Digglar; Knife Party	5:16
9.	"Last Time" (R3hab Remix)	McKenzie; Williams	Labrinth; Da Digglar; R3hab

Sample credits

- "Express Yourself" contains a sample of "Express Yourself" as written by Charles Wright and performed by Charles Wright & the Watts 103rd Street Rhythm Band and "Funky Drummer" as written and performed by James Brown.
- "Sundown" contains lyrics from the 1970 song "Big Yellow Taxi" by Joni Mitchell.

== Personnel ==
Musical personnel

- Labrinth – vocals, keyboards, guitars, bass, drums, programming, production
- Da Digglar – production and additional programming on all tracks
- Joachim Walker – engineering (tracks 3, 4, 5, 7, 8, 9 and 10); additional programming (tracks 3 and 4)
- Cliff Masterson – strings arrangements (tracks 3, 7 and 10); strings programming (track 3)
- Andy Gangadeen – additional drums (tracks 4 and 8)
- Tim Burnes – horns (track 5)
- Jake Telford – horns (track 5)
- Nick Etwell – horns (track 5)

Additional personnel

- Serban Ghenea – mixing (tracks 2, 3, 4, 6 and 10)
- Mike Spencer – mixing (tracks 1, 5 and 9)
- John Hanes – mix engineering (tracks 2, 3, 4 and 6)
- Tom Elmhirst – mixing (track 7)
- Jaycen Joshua – mixing (track 8)
- Vlado Mellor – mastering
- Tom Hingston – art direction, design

== Charts and certifications ==
=== Weekly charts ===
Chart (2012–13)	Peak position
Australian Albums (ARIA)	30
Irish Albums (IRMA)	19
Scottish Albums (Official Charts)	6
UK Albums (Official Charts)	2

=== Year-end charts ===
Chart (2012)	Position
UK Albums (OCC)	46

=== Certifications ===
Region	Certification	Certified units/sales
New Zealand (RMNZ)	Gold	7,500^{‡}
United Kingdom (BPI)	Platinum	300,000^{‡}
^{‡} Sales+streaming figures based on certification alone.

== Release history ==
Region	Date	Label	Format	Ref.
United Kingdom	2 April 2012	Syco Music	CD	
United Kingdom	2 April 2012	Syco Music	2CD	
United Kingdom	2 April 2012	Syco Music	10CD	
United States	11 December 2012	Capitol Records	CD	
