= Earthquake (Labrinth song) =

2011 single by Labrinth

Single by Labrinth featuring Tinie Tempah

from the album Electronic Earth
- Released: 23 October 2011
- Recorded: 2011
- Genre: Hip hop; electronica; grime; dubstep
- Length: 4:34 (full version); 3:35 (radio edit); 3:53 (music video)
- Label: Syco; Sony
- Songwriters: Timothy McKenzie; Patrick Okogwu
- Producer: Labrinth

Labrinth singles chronology
"Let It Go" (2010)	"Earthquake" (2011)	"Teardrop" (2011)

Tinie Tempah singles chronology
"Love Suicide" (2011)	"Earthquake" (2011)	"Angels & Stars" (2012)

"Earthquake" is a song by British musician Labrinth which features long-time collaborator Tinie Tempah. The track was released on 29 October 2011 in the United Kingdom as the second single from the artist's debut studio album, Electronic Earth (2012). It debuted at number two on the UK Singles Chart, having sold 115,530 copies and setting the second-highest one-week sales at number 2 of the year, behind Little Mix.

== Background ==
Labrinth first revealed the radio edit of "Earthquake" on his official YouTube channel, on 16 September 2011. Remixes by Benny Benassi, Noisia, Eyes, Gareth Wyn and Street Policy were uploaded to Labrinth's SoundCloud account on the same day. Labrinth explained the song's meaning to MTV UK: "For me, the track is about making an earthquake and having people look my way because of how much noise I'm making. Sometimes, the one that shouts the loudest is the one that gets heard, so 'Earthquake' is shouting as high as it can." Both the royal trumpets and the operatic monk chorus part were last-minute additions to the record. Labrinth inserted the bridge after a friend dared him to put it in.

The full explicit version of "Earthquake" was uploaded to Labrinth's SoundCloud account on 23 September 2011.

Labrinth and Tinie Tempah performed an acoustic version of "Earthquake" with an orchestra and choir in BBC Radio 1's Live Lounge on 20 October 2011.

The song was originally intended to be a collaboration with former Welsh rock band Lostprophets.

On 1 January 2012, "Earthquake" was used for the New Year's Eve in London celebrations during the fireworks display at the London Eye.

The "All-Stars" remix featuring rappers Kano, Wretch 32 and Busta Rhymes and new verses by Labrinth and Tinie Tempah was included on the bonus edition of his debut album. The official remix with only the Busta Rhymes verse was also released as a single in the US through iTunes on 21 February 2012 and was included on Now That's What I Call Music! 42 as a "Now What's Next" bonus track.

The song is in the key of C minor, a fact alluded to in the lyrics of the song.

This song also featured in the trailer for the video game DiRT:Showdown.

== Music video ==
The HD video of the song was uploaded to Labrinth's official Vevo/YouTube channel on 29 October 2011. As of October 2025, the song has received over 111 million views. The video was directed by a US Studio, Syndrome Studios, and was edited by Aleks Colic.

== Track listing ==
Digital download
No.	Title	Length
1.	"Earthquake" (Radio Edit)	3:36
2.	"Earthquake" (Full Version) (Clean)	4:32
3.	"Earthquake" (Benny Benassi Remix)	5:00
4.	"Earthquake" (Gareth Wyn Remix)	7:00
5.	"Earthquake" (Noisia Remix)	6:29

Digital download (MyPlay Direct version)
No.	Title	Length
1.	"Earthquake" (radio edit)	3:36
2.	"Earthquake" (full version)	4:32
3.	"Earthquake" (Benny Benassi Remix)	5:00
4.	"Earthquake" (Gareth Wyn Remix)	7:00
5.	"Earthquake" (Noisia Remix)	6:29
6.	"Earthquake" (Eyes Remix)	4:15
7.	"Earthquake" (Street Policy Remix)	3:10

All Stars Remix (album bonus track)
No.	Title	Length
1.	"Earthquake" (featuring Tinie Tempah, Kano, Wretch 32 and Busta Rhymes) (All Stars Remix)	4:52

== Charts ==
=== Weekly charts ===
Chart (2011–12)	Peak position
Australia (ARIA)	4
Australia Urban (ARIA)	2
Belgium (Ultratip Bubbling Under Flanders)	6
Ireland (IRMA)	12
Netherlands (Single Top 100)	69
Norway (VG-lista)	18
New Zealand (Recorded Music NZ)	5
Scotland Singles (OCC)	2
UK Hip Hop/R&B (OCC)	2
UK Singles (OCC)	2
UK Official Streaming Chart Top 100	31
US Hot Dance Club Songs (Billboard)	30

=== Year-end charts ===
Chart (2011)	Peak position
UK Singles (OCC)	23

Chart (2012)	Peak position
Australia (ARIA)	25
Australia Urban (ARIA)	6
New Zealand (Recorded Music NZ)	36
UK Singles (OCC)	52

== Certifications ==
Region	Certification	Certified units/sales
Australia (ARIA)	4× Platinum	280,000^{^}
New Zealand (RMNZ)	2× Platinum	30,000^{*}
Norway (IFPI Norway)	2× Platinum	20,000^{*}
United Kingdom (BPI)	2× Platinum	1,200,000^{‡}
^{*} Sales figures based on certification alone.^{^} Shipments figures based on certification alone.^{‡} Sales+streaming figures based on certification alone.

== Release history ==
Region	Date	Format
United Kingdom	23 October 2011	Digital download
United Kingdom	23 October 2011	CD single
Germany	23 October 2011	Digital download
United States	28 February 2012	Digital download
