= Let the Sun Shine =

2010 single by Labrinth

Single by Labrinth

from the album Electronic Earth
- Released: 27 September 2010
- Recorded: 2010
- Genre: Electropop; R&B
- Length: 3:00
- Label: Simco Limited; Sony Music
- Songwriter: Labrinth
- Producers: Labrinth; Da Diggler

Labrinth singles chronology
"Frisky" (2010)	"Let the Sun Shine" (2010)	"Let It Go" (2011)

"Let the Sun Shine" is the debut single from English musician, Labrinth. It was produced and written by Labrinth and Da Digglar, and was released on 27 September 2010 on Simco Ltd and Sony Records. The single is available on iTunes as an extended-play, which also includes 4 remixes of the song.

In a special Live Lounge, Leona Lewis performed an acoustic cover of the song at the Hackney Empire.

== Critical reception ==
Robert Copsey of Digital Spy gave the song a positive review:

...for starters Labbers has something no amount of studio trickery can create: soul. While the track's beat is reminiscent of many a Taio/Derülo/Ne-Yo number, his passionate performance and heartfelt lyrics about letting go of negativity set him strides apart from the current crop of robopop vocalists - and with a chorus that fuses gospel, funk and R&B, it certainly feels worthy of a eureka moment. Oh, and as if we couldn't be any more impressed, apparently there’s even a "Cyndi Lauper-esque track" waiting on his album. Bring. It. On.

.

== Chart performance ==
Having been predicted to debut at number 2 behind Tinie Tempah's "Written in the Stars", "Let the Sun Shine" debuted at number 3 on 3 October 2010 behind Tempah and Bruno Mars with "Just the Way You Are"; marking Labrinth's third Top 5 hit (including the two collaborations with Tempah). The single also debuted on the Irish Singles Chart at number 32 on 7 October 2010. As of March 2012, "Let the Sun Shine" has sold 311,529 copies in the United Kingdom.

== Track listing ==
- Digital download
1. "Let the Sunshine" – 2:59
2. "Let the Sunshine" (Joey Negro Radio Remix) – 3:13
3. "Let the Sunshine" (Dave Spoon Remix) – 5:50
4. "Let the Sunshine" (Roller Express Remix) – 4:38
5. "Let the Sunshine" (A Star Remix) (featuring Wretch 32) – 4:12

== Charts ==
Chart (2010)	Peak position
Ireland (IRMA)	32
Scotland Singles (OCC)	3
UK Singles (OCC)	3

Chart (2012)	Peak position
South Korea International (Circle)	87

== Certifications ==
Region	Certification	Certified units/sales
United Kingdom (BPI)	Platinum	600,000^{‡}
^{‡} Sales+streaming figures based on certification alone.

== Release history ==
Region	Date	Format
Germany	26 September 2010	Digital download
United Kingdom	26 September 2010	Digital download
United Kingdom	27 September 2010	CD single
