= Euphoria Season 2 (An HBO Original Series Soundtrack) =

Compilation album by Euphoria
- Released: March 4, 2022
- Length: 47:25
- Label: Interscope Records
- Producer: Labrinth

Euphoria chronology
Euphoria Season 1 (An HBO Original Series Soundtrack) (2021)	Euphoria Season 2 (An HBO Original Series Soundtrack) (2022)	Euphoria Season 2 Official Score (From the HBO Original Series) (2022)

Singles from Euphoria Season 2
- 1. "Watercolor Eyes" Released: January 21, 2022; 2. "How Long" Released: January 26, 2022; 3. "(Pick Me Up) Euphoria" Released: January 28, 2022; 4. "Sad4whattt" Released: January 28, 2022; 5. "Yeh I Fuckin' Did It" Released: February 6, 2022; 6. "I'm Tired" Released: February 28, 2022; 7. "Elliot's Song" Released: March 4, 2022

Euphoria Season 2 (An HBO Original Series Soundtrack) is the compilation album to the second season of the American teen drama television series Euphoria, released by Interscope Records on March 4, 2022, with compact discs on May 13, and phonograph records on July 29. The album has seven singles, "Watercolor Eyes" by Lana Del Rey, "How Long" by Tove Lo, "(Pick Me Up) Euphoria" by James Blake and Labrinth, "Sad4whattt" by Ericdoa, "Yeh I Fuckin' Did it" by Labrinth, "I'm Tired" by Labrinth and Zendaya, and "Elliot's Song" by Dominic Fike and Zendaya.

== Background ==
Adam Leber and Jen Malone are the music supervisors for Euphoria. Malone told Business Insider about the creation of the compilation album syaing that "you can have the most perfect song for the scene, but if you can't clear it and you can't afford it, you can't use it." Esquire described the soundtrack as "virtually a character".

== Commercial performance ==
The compilation album's release was preceded by seven singles, "Watercolor Eyes" by Lana Del Rey on January 21, "How Long" by Tove Lo on January 26, "(Pick Me Up) Euphoria" by James Blake and Labrinth, "Sad4whattt" by Ericdoa both on January 28, "Yeh I Fuckin' Did it" by Labrinth on February 6, "I'm Tired" by Labrinth and Zendaya on February 28, and "Elliot's Song" by Dominic Fike and Zendaya on March 4.

== Accolades ==
At the 74th Primetime Creative Arts Emmy Awards, Malone and Leber were nominated for the Primetime Emmy Award for Outstanding Music Supervision for their work in the second season premiere "Trying to Get to Heaven Before They Close the Door", which featured three tracks from the compilation album. Labrinth, series writer Sam Levinson, and Zendaya were nominated for the Primetime Emmy Award for Outstanding Original Music and Lyrics for their work on "I'm Tired" in season 2 episode four "You Who Cannot See, Think of Those Who Can". Labrinth his girlfriend Muzhda "Muz" Zemar-McKenzie, and Zendaya were nominated for the same award for their work on "Elliot's Song" in season 2's finale "All My Life, My Heart Has Yearned for a Thing I Cannot Name". Labrinth, Levinson and Zendaya were also nominated for the Black Reel TV Awards for Outstanding Original Song in 2022 for "I'm Tired". Dominic Fike, who performed "Elliot's Song" was nominated for Best Song at the 2022 MTV Movie & TV Awards.

== Track listing ==
Euphoria Season 2 (An HBO Original Series Soundtrack) track listing
No.	Title	Artist(s)	Length
1.	"I'm Tired"	Labrinth and Zendaya	3:07
2.	"Don't Be Cruel"	Billy Swan	4:13
3.	"Dead of Night"	Orville Peck	3:59
4.	"Live or Die"	Noah Cyrus and Lil Xan	3:14
5.	"Right Down the Line"	Gerry Rafferty	4:27
6.	"Yeh I Fuckin' Did It"	Labrinth	2:11
7.	"Never Tear Us Apart"	INXS	3:06
8.	"Watercolor Eyes"	Lana Del Rey	3:31
9.	"(Pick Me Up) Euphoria"	James Blake and Labrinth	3:15
10.	"How Long"	Tove Lo	3:19
11.	"Call Me Irresponsible"	Bobby Darrin	2:05
12.	"It Ain't Over 'til It's Over"	Lenny Kravitz	4:02
13.	"Elliot's Song"	Dominic Fike and Zendaya	2:30
14.	"Sad4whattt"	Ericdoa	1:58
15.	"U Could Tëll"	Yeat	2:28
Total length:			47:25

== Charts ==
Chart performance for Euphoria Season 2 (An HBO Original Series Soundtrack)
Chart (2022)	Peak position
UK Soundtrack Albums (Official Charts)	12

== Release history ==
Release dates and formats for Euphoria Season 2 (An HBO Original Series Soundtrack)
Region	Date	Format	Label	Reference
Various	March 4, 2022	Digital download; streaming	Interscope Records	
Various	May 13, 2022	CD	Interscope Records	
Various	July 29, 2022	LP	Interscope Records	
