= Euphoria Season 2 Official Score (From the HBO Original Series) =

Soundtrack album by Labrinth
- Released: 22 April 2022
- Length: 49:02
- Label: Columbia Records
- Producer: Labrinth

Labrinth chronology
Imagination & the Misfit Kid (2019)	Euphoria Season 2 Official Score (From the HBO Original Series) (2022)	Ends & Begins (2023)

Euphoria chronology
Euphoria Season 2 (An HBO Original Series Soundtrack) (2022)	Euphoria Season 2 Official Score (From the HBO Original Series) (2022)	Euphoria: Season 3 (HBO Original Series Soundtrack) (2026)

Euphoria Season 2 Official Score (From the HBO Original Series) is British singer Labrinth's soundtrack album to the second season of the American teen drama television series Euphoria. It was released by Columbia Records on 22 April 2022. The album peaked at number 162 on the Billboard 200.

== Background ==
British musician Labrinth composed the music for Euphoria season 1 and returned for the second season. This was the final Euphoria score in the series composed by Labrinth, as he would leave the show during the production of the third season due to a behind-the scenes feud with creator Sam Levinson.

== Composition ==
Consisting primarily of instrumental tracks, the album features guest vocals from Angus Cloud, Zendaya and Dominic Fike. Producer Labrinth was interviewed by IndieWire about the soundtrack: "We spoke about using organs because of a lot of the religious influences in the show, especially with Rue. We wanted a lot of the sounds edging towards a religious sound. And because I love both Pentecostal and Catholic sounds, I kind of was like trying to merge them both together."

== Commercial performance ==
The soundtrack features the previously released singles "I'm Tired", "Elliot's Song", and "Mount Everest" which peaked at numbers 49, 91, and 58 on the UK singles chart, respectively. The first two were featured on the Euphoria Season 2 (An HBO Original Series Soundtrack), and the latter song was also featured on the Euphoria (Original Score from the HBO Series) as well as Labrinth's 2019 album Imagination & the Misfit Kid. A music video for "Mount Everest" premiered on Labrinth's official YouTube channel on April 22 to coincide with the release of the soundtrack.

== Accolades ==
At the 74th Primetime Creative Arts Emmy Awards, Labrinth, Levinson, and Zendaya were nominated for the Primetime Emmy Award for Outstanding Original Music and Lyrics for their work on "I'm Tired" in season 2 episode four "You Who Cannot See, Think of Those Who Can". Labrinth his girlfriend Muzhda "Muz" Zemar-McKenzie, and Zendaya were nominated for the same award for their work on "Elliot's Song" in season 2's finale "All My Life, My Heart Has Yearned for a Thing I Cannot Name". Labrinth, Levinson and Zendaya were also nominated for the Black Reel TV Awards for Outstanding Original Song in 2022 for "I'm Tired". Dominic Fike, who performed "Elliot's Song" was nominated for Best Song at the 2022 MTV Movie & TV Awards.

== Track listing ==
All tracks are written by and produced by Labrinth, except where noted.

No.	Title	Writer(s)	Length
1.	"The Angels"		0:45
2.	"I'm Tired" (long version)	Labrinth; Sam Levinson; Zendaya	3:31
3.	"ICE (We Should Do Drugs)"		2:45
4.	"See You Assholes Later"		2:30
5.	"She Certainly Looks the Part"		0:48
6.	"Dracula (Nate Sees Cassie)"		2:48
7.	"Skeletons (Lexi Needed a Break)"		2:22
8.	"Putting Everything Away"		0:43
9.	"Fez's Interlude" (with Angus Cloud)		1:01
10.	"El Weirdo (I Relapsed)"		1:58
11.	"This Is Life"		0:30
12.	"Every Second Counts"		3:00
13.	"Truth or Dare"		0:15
14.	"Washing Off the Blood"		3:07
15.	"Elliot's Song" (with Dominic Fike and Zendaya)	Labrinth; Muzhda "Muz" Zemar-McKenzie; Zendaya	2:30
16.	"I Don't Know If I'm a Good Person"		0:32
17.	"Love Is Complicated (The Angels Sing)"		3:19
18.	"Fun at the Alley"		2:04
19.	"Sidekicks Are Smarter"		0:21
20.	"Pros & Cons"		3:26
21.	"At Least I'm Loved"		2:21
22.	"Rue's I'm Tired" (with Zendaya)	Labrinth; Levinson; Zendaya	2:17
23.	"Mount Everest"		2:37
24.	"I'm Tired" (with Zendaya)	Labrinth; Levinson; Zendaya	3:07
Total length:			49:02

== Charts ==
Weekly chart performance for Euphoria Season 2 Official Score (From the HBO Original Series)
Chart (2022)	Peak position
Canadian Albums (Billboard)	92
French Albums (SNEP)	115
German Albums (Offizielle Top 100)	73
US Billboard 200	162
US Soundtrack Albums (Billboard)	3

== Release history ==
Release dates and formats for Euphoria Season 2 Official Score (From the HBO Original Series)
Region	Date	Format	Label	Reference
Various	22 April 2022	CD; digital download; streaming; box set	Columbia Records	
