= All My Life, My Heart Has Yearned for a Thing I Cannot Name =

- Euphoria episode
- Our Life's final moments
- Episode no.: Season 2 Episode 8
- Directed by: Sam Levinson
- Written by: Sam Levinson
- Cinematography by: Marcell Rév
- Editing by: Aaron I. Butler; Darrin Navarro; Julio C. Perez IV
- Original air date: February 27, 2022
- Running time: 61 minutes

Guest appearances
- Alanna Ubach as Suze Howard; Tyler Chase as Custer; Nick Blood as Gus Howard; Aja Bair as Jade; Eden Rose as Hallie; Izabella Alvarez as Marta; Isabella Amara as Luna

Episode chronology
← Previous "The Theater and Its Double"	Next → "Ándale"
- Euphoria season 2

"All My Life, My Heart Has Yearned for a Thing I Cannot Name" is the eighth and final episode of the second season of the American teen drama television series Euphoria. The episode was written and directed by series creator Sam Levinson. It originally aired on HBO on February 27, 2022. The title of this episode is a reference to a quote from the 1937 book Mad Love by French writer André Breton.

In the episode Lexi Howard's (Maude Apatow) school play called Our Life which features fictionalized versions of her family and friends continues from the previous episode. Lexi's older sister Cassie (Sydney Sweeney) interrupts the play in fury while Fezco O'Neill's (Angus Cloud) apartment is raided by a SWAT team.

"All My Life, My Heart Has Yearned for a Thing I Cannot Name" received mixed reviews. Out of the sixteen Primetime Emmy Award nominations received by the show for its second season, one was specifically for this episode, Outstanding Original Music and Lyrics for "Elliot's Song".

== Plot ==
Fezco O'Neill (Angus Cloud) is about to leave for Lexi Howard's (Maude Apatow) play, Our Life, when Custer tells him that Mouse's body has been found. Faye Valentine (Chloe Cherry) drops her glass and grabs Fezco's attention, signaling to him not to talk. Ashtray (Javon Walton) stabs Custer in the throat. Fez realizes that Custer's phone is recording and tells Ash to be quiet as he covers Custer's dying breaths.

Cassie (Sydney Sweeney) walks onto stage and berates her younger sister Lexi for being a bystander. Their mother Suze (Alanna Ubach) tries to defuse the situation. The panicked crew eventually continue the play to a depiction of "Hallie" on the carousel, prompting Cassie to attack the actress playing her. Cassie's ex-friend Maddy Perez (Alexa Demie) runs on stage and fights Cassie, chasing her backstage and slamming her head-first into a wall.

Days before the play, Rue Bennett (Zendaya) thanks Elliot (Dominic Fike) for telling Jules Vaughn (Hunter Schafer), who neither have spoken to, about her relapse. In the present, Rue begins a chant of Lexi's name, motivated to continue the show, Lexi gives a speech to the audience, dedicating the play to Fezco. Faye, Fezco and Ashtray learn a SWAT team are coming. As Fezco begs him to surrender, Ashtray hides in the bathtub with several guns.

Nate Jacobs (Jacob Elordi) finds his father Cal (Eric Dane) in a warehouse and reveals to him he has sent all his sex tapes to the police, who arrive and arrest him. The SWAT team raid Fezco's apartment; they discover Custer's corpse and arrest Faye and Fezco. Ashtray begins shooting. Ashtray feigns death and shoots the officer who opens the door before another officer shoots him in the head.

A day after the play, Rue tells Lexi that Our Life was the first time she's reminisced and not hated herself. Moments after the play, the fighting between Cassie and Maddy has diffused, with the former telling Maddy that Nate had already broken up with her before she went on stage. A stoic Maddy tells an ashamed Cassie that their breakup is only the beginning, before leaving the school. Jules sits next to Rue and tells her that she loves and misses her. Rue looks back at Jules to kiss her on the cheek and leaves. Jules begins to cry. Rue narrates that she stayed sober the rest of the school year and resolved to be a good person as she leaves the school.

== Production ==
=== Writing ===
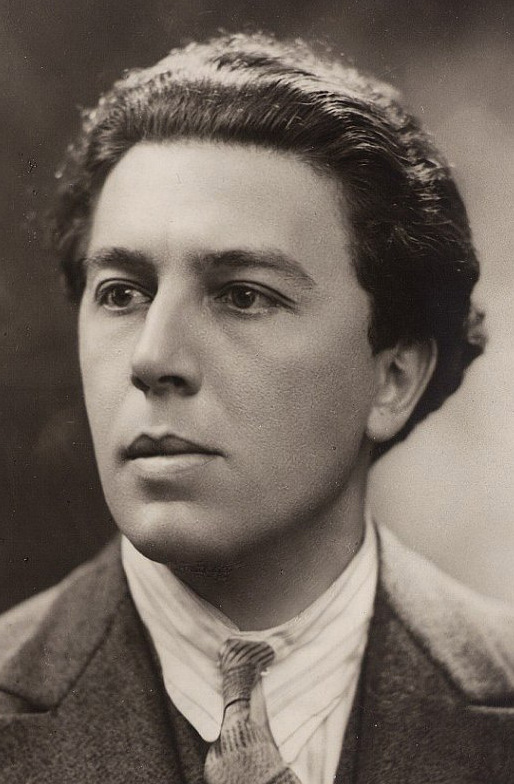
The episode's title is Euphoria's second to come from a André Breton quote.

A quote from Mad Love (1937), written by French founder of surrealism and poet André Breton is the origin of the episode's title. This name was chosen to parallel Rue's reaction to Our Life. In the original draft of the finale, rather than Ashtray, Fezco was to be killed by the SWAT team sniper. Ashtray's actor Walton told Entertainment Weekly that "it was insane that ended up being the ending of it all".

=== Filming ===
In a behind-the-scenes video uploaded to Euphoria's YouTube channel, Faye's actress Cherry said that "shooting the SWAT scene was super interesting. It felt very real. There were a couple of times where it was, like, kinda scary". Series creator Sam Levinson added that "there's an enormous amount of precautions that go into it. All of these things to ensure that we're all doing it in a safe way. But that still allow us to do the work."

=== Music ===
In the finale, Fike's character Elliot performs a ballad on acoustic guitar to serenade Zendaya's character Rue when she visits his house in a flashback. "Elliot's Song" was written by series composer Labrinth, his girlfriend Muzhda Zemar-McKenzie, and star Zendaya. The scene received criticism and was made into a meme due to its length.

== Reception ==
=== Ratings ===
According to Nielsen Media Research, upon airing "All My Life, My Heart Has Yearned for a Thing I Cannot Name" was watched by 625,000 people, the most live linear viewers on any Euphoria episode. They estimated that 0.24 percent of the total 18-49 population in the US was tuning in. Including stats from HBO's streaming service Max, the episode drew 6,600,000 viewers on its first day of release, higher than any previous episode. HBO Max crashed due to the large spike in viewers just before the finale's broadcast.

=== Critical reviews ===
Review aggregator Rotten Tomatoes gives the episode has an approval score of 50 percent, based on 16 critical reviews. The website's critical consensus reads, "Euphoria's second season finale delivers a graceful payoff to Rue's struggles with addiction, but at the expense of all the other storylines in this underserved ensemble." In a ranking of the first two seasons and specials, BuzzFeed listed "All My Life, My Heart Has Yearned for a Thing I Cannot Name" at nine out of eighteen, writing: "The finale had some gut-wrenching, poignant moments, but felt a bit uneven and messy, especially compared to how tight other episodes in the past have been." IndieWire placed it at the same number in a list which included season three's premiere "Ándale", writing that "Elliot’s long song is a bit of a chore, but 'All My Life' remains a perhaps unintentional but nonethless poignant close to the series' high school years".

CNN criticised the finale, writing that it "brings the curtain down with a heavy dose of melodrama". In a three out of five star review for The Independent, Annabel Nugent wrote that the episode "seesaws between high-paced thriller and teary drama". Thrillist wrote that the finale "reminded us that the show is at its best when it's not doing the most". Michael-Michelle Pratt of The A.V. Club described the finale as ending "with both renewed promise and frustration", writing: "[It] maintains the narrative imbalance we've seen throughout season two [...] Euphoria is a world of beautifully shot and heightened versions of the teenage experience; this is even truer in the show's second season. But the storylines that drew more directly from the series creator's own experiences—addiction, grief, loneliness, and channeling pain into art—were always better served than those outside of that realm. Jules, Maddy, Kat, and Cassie ultimately got the short shrift." Allegra Frank of Slate added that the finale was the last episode they would ever watch, calling the episode "a hot mess of a finale leaves lots of questions, and little reason to care about the answers".

=== Accolades ===
The episode was "Elliot's Song"'s submission at the 74th Primetime Creative Arts Emmy Awards, leading Labrinth for his music and Zemar-McKenzie and Zendaya for their lyrics to a nomination for the Primetime Emmy Award for Outstanding Original Music and Lyrics. At the 2022 MTV Movie & TV Awards, Fike was also nominated for Best Song. Cassie and Maddy's fight in the episode won the MTV Movie Award for Best Fight. Jason Baldwin-Stewart's production design in this episode, the previous and "You Who Cannot See, Think of Those Who Can" was honored at the Art Directors Guild Awards 2022 with a nomination for Excellence in Production Design for a One-Hour Contemporary Single-Camera Series.
