= Trying to Get to Heaven Before They Close the Door =

- Euphoria episode
- Cassie Howard hides in a bathtub.
- Episode no.: Season 2 Episode 1
- Directed by: Sam Levinson
- Written by: Sam Levinson
- Cinematography by: Marcell Rév
- Editing by: Julio C. Perez IV
- Original air date: January 9, 2022
- Running time: 61 minutes

Guest appearances
- Tyler Chase as Custer; Martha Kelly as Laurie; Andy Mackenzie as Bowl-Cut; Richie Merritt as Bruce Jr.; Demetrius Flenory Jr. as Travis; Kathrine Narducci as Marie O'Neill

Episode chronology
← Previous "Fuck Anyone Who's Not a Sea Blob"	Next → "Out of Touch"
- Euphoria season 2

"Trying to Get to Heaven Before They Close the Door" is the second season premiere of the American teen drama television series Euphoria. The episode was written and directed by series creator Sam Levinson. It originally aired on HBO on January 9, 2022. The title of this episode is a reference to the 1997 song "Tryin' to Get to Heaven" by American singer-songwriter Bob Dylan.

The episode's cold open introduces young Fezco O'Neill (Angus Cloud) being brought into the illegal drug trade by his grandmother. In the episode proper, Rue Bennett (Zendaya) tags along with Fezco to a New Year's Eve drug deal, before the both of them attend a house party, where Rue crosses paths with her estranged girlfriend Jules Vaughn (Hunter Schafer) and Fezco attacks Nate Jacobs (Jacob Elordi).

"Trying to Get to Heaven Before They Close the Door" received largely positive reviews. Out of the sixteen Primetime Emmy Award nominations received by the show for its second season, two were specifically for this episode, Outstanding Music Supervision and Outstanding Contemporary Costumes.

== Plot ==
Fezco O'Neill's (Angus Cloud) grandmother Marie O'Neill (Kathrine Narducci) shoots Fezco's father in the legs and enlists young Fezco into the illegal drug trade. Marie receives a baby from a customer as collateral, but he is never picked up. After eating a cigarette, Marie names him Ashtray (Javon Walton). Later, when Fezco tries to stop Marie from beating, with a crowbar, a dealer who scammed her, she accidentally hits him, causing a traumatic brain injury. When Marie has a stroke and becomes bedridden, Fezco takes over her business.

In the present, Mouse arrives at Fezco's to collect his money following the raid; Ashtray kills Mouse with a hammer. Several weeks later, on New Year's Eve, Rue Bennett (Zendaya) tags along with Ashtray and Fezco to find a new supplier. After meeting Custer and his girlfriend Faye Valentine (Chloe Cherry), Laurie's (Martha Kelly) thugs force the group to strip to check that they do not have covert listening devices. Fezco vouches for Rue to Laurie, who fronts him a suitcase of drugs. Meanwhile, Jules Vaughn (Hunter Schafer), Maddy Perez (Alexa Demie), and Kat Hernandez (Barbie Ferreira) arrive at a large house party.

At a convenience store, Nate Jacobs (Jacob Elordi) stumbles upon a depressed Cassie Howard (Sydney Sweeney). The two drink and he drives her dangerously fast to the party, where they impulsively have sex in a bathroom; they are nearly caught by Maddy, who knocks on the door. Under Nate's instructions, Cassie hides in the bathtub while Maddy smokes cannabis with Travis (Demetrius Flenory Jr.), another partygoer, in the bathroom.

Sat together, Fezco compliments Lexi Howard's (Maude Apatow) intelligence and they discuss religion. In Custer's car, Rue injects Faye's heroin, before taking a spate of drugs with fellow addict teen, Elliot (Dominic Fike), in a laundry room. When Rue's pulse slows, Elliot normalizes her heart rate with crushed adderall. Chris McKay (Algee Smith) arrives and converses with Cassie about their breakup, during which Cassie tearfully admits to her infidelity. Upset, McKay leaves and Nate harasses him, asking if they had sex.

Around the campfire, Rue coldly confesses to Jules that she relapsed the night she left. Jules tears up with guilt. Meanwhile, Fezco gets Lexi's phone number. As midnight strikes, Rue apologizes to Jules, and the two share a kiss. In a verbal confrontation, Fezco brushes off a threat from Nate before smashing a liquor bottle over his head and beating him for a prolonged time. Rue and Jules stare in shock.

== Production ==
=== Writing ===
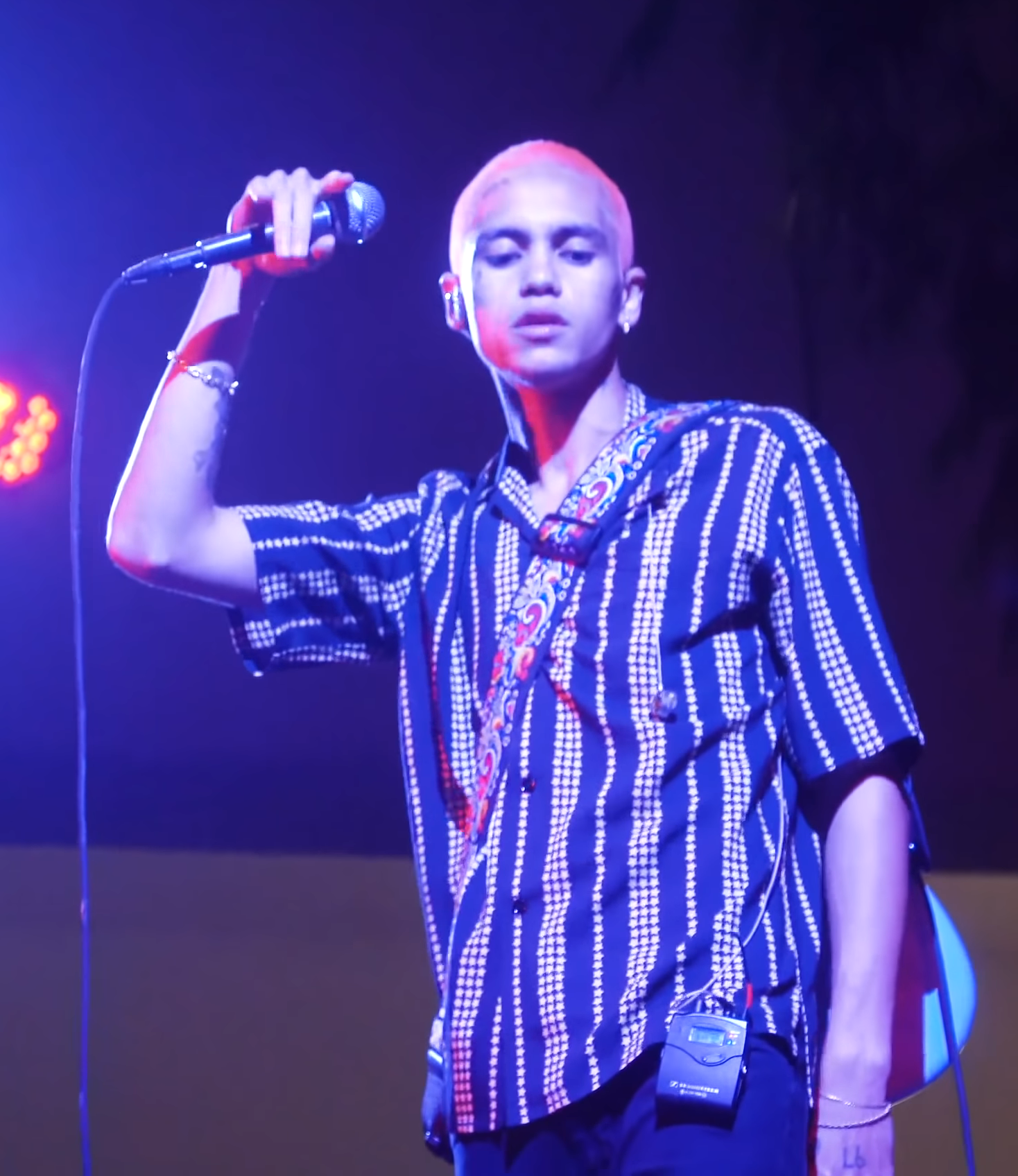
Dominic Fike joined the main cast in "Trying to Get to Heaven Before They Close the Door".

"Tryin' to Get to Heaven" from Bob Dylan's 1997 album Time Out of Mind is the origin of the episode's title, the full name is a lyric in the song's verse. This name was chosen to parallel the desperate, ticking-clock mentality of characters running out of time to find salvation, heal their trauma, or achieve happiness before their window of opportunity slams shut.

=== Filming ===
Location shooting for opening sequence in which Marie shoots Fezco's father was filmed at a real strip club in North Hills, Los Angeles called Odd Ball Cabaret Showgirls. Her assault on Bowl-Cut was filmed outside the Family Donuts shop in Burbank, California. Cassie and Nate's first meeting was also filmed in Burbank, at Moonlight Liquor. The younger version of Ashtray portrayed in the cold open is played by his actor Javon Walton's younger brother Daelo. On the day of broadcast, a GQ interview with Cloud on the episode's production was uploaded. Asked about the filming of the final sequence, an attack on Nate by Fezco, Cloud described it as "a hard scene to shoot, man. A lot of broken bottles and a lot of different movements. I was swinging my fist for like three hours. My arm was sore as shit, man. I swear to God, my whole shoulder, just from swinging fake air punches that weren't even hitting anything." He talked about the photography running for five days from "7:00 PM till sunrise, all solid all-nighters". The filming days for the episode's New Year's Eve party scenes were extensive. Elordi told Thrillist that "We shot that party for over a week, so very quickly it's like being in Hell. It's like being in a party that you don't want to be in."

=== Music ===
When Rue is introduced in the episode, she is singing along to "Hit 'Em Up" by Tupac Shakur. During Jules' first scene, "Hypnotize" by The Notorious B.I.G. plays. Infamously, both rappers had a feud, which ended in their murders within eight months of each other. This hints at the eventual break up between the girls depicted in episode five "Stand Still Like the Hummingbird". Laurie's husband dances to "Right Down the Line" by Gerry Rafferty while he forces the other to strip. Other licensed songs in the premiere include "Don't Be Cruel" by Billy Swan, "Dead of Night" by Orville Peck and "Dirty Work" by Steely Dan.

== Reception ==
=== Ratings ===
According to Nielsen Media Research, upon airing "Trying to Get to Heaven Before They Close the Door" was watched by 254,000 people. They estimated that 0.08% of the total 18-49 population in the US was tuning in. Including stats from HBO's streaming service Max, the episode drew 2,400,000 viewers on its first day of release. A spokesperson for WarnerMedia called it “the strongest digital premiere night performance for any episode of an HBO series since HBO Max launch and a series-record more than double the season 1 premiere.” Three weeks after its original broadcast, the episode had bumped up to 10.8 million total viewers. By the broadcast of the season finale, the premiere’s viewership was approaching 19 million viewers. The episode is the most social premium cable episode since the Game of Thrones finale "The Iron Throne".

=== Critical reviews ===
Review aggregator website Rotten Tomatoes gives the episode an approval score of 88%, based on 6 critical reviews. In a ranking of the first two seasons and specials, BuzzFeed listed "Trying to Get to Heaven Before They Close the Door" at two out of eighteen, writing: "So much happens in this episode, it sets up the second season spectacularly." IndieWire placed it at seventeenth in a list which included season three's premiere "Ándale", writing that the episode "proves to be more of a dreary, miserable slog than it does a compelling reintroduction."

Morgan Cormack at Stylist said watching the episode felt like "a (rather brilliant) horror", writing: "we couldn’t tear our eyes away from what was a classic episode of Euphoria – just the sort of thing we’ve sorely missed during its Covid-induced absence from our screens. We can’t wait to see how the new season unfolds." Forbes' Dani Di Placido wrote that, "Euphoria's reintroduction is just as vibrant, beautifully shot, and gleefully tasteless as the first season, soaked in sex, violence, and pretty lights; it’s nice to have it back." The A.V. Club described the premiere as "intriguing and solid". Journalist Michael-Michelle Pratt added "I’m optimistic that the thinness of the writing season one will be replaced with more characters and plot lines to match the filmmaking and performances." In a 3 out of 5 star critique for The Daily Telegraph, Anita Singh wrote "this show is determined to shock – but Grange Hill did it first". Singh concluded that the episode was "anchored by a terrific performance by Zendaya, but it's as bleak as it is excessive."

=== Accolades ===
The episode was Euphoria's submission for two of its nominations at the 74th Primetime Creative Arts Emmy Awards. Music supervisors Jen Malone and Adam Leber were nominated for the Primetime Emmy Award for Outstanding Music Supervision for their work in the episode. Costume designers Heidi Bivens, Devon Patterson, and Angelina Vito were nominated for the Primetime Emmy Award for Outstanding Contemporary Costumes for their work in the episode. "Trying to Get to Heaven Before They Close the Door"'s costumes were additionally honored at the 25th Costume Designers Guild Awards with a nomination for Excellence in Contemporary Television in 2023.
