= Sad4whattt =

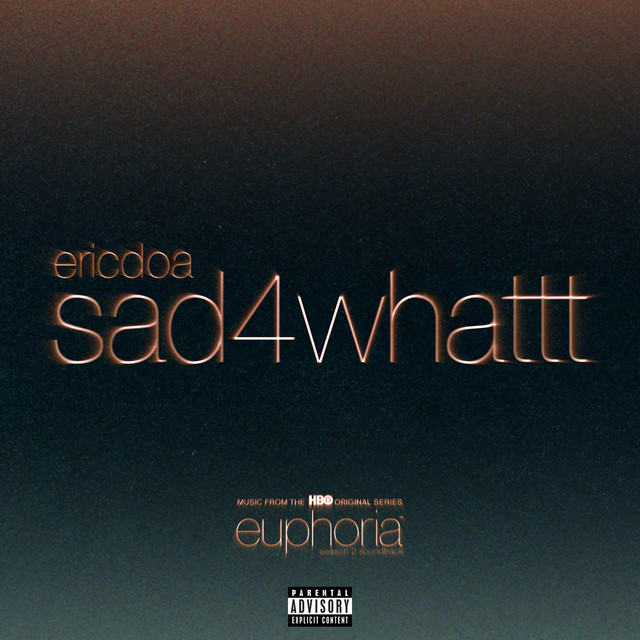

Single by Ericdoa

from the album Euphoria Season 2 (An HBO Original Series Soundtrack)
- Released: January 28, 2022
- Genre: Hyperpop
- Length: 1:58
- Label: Listen to the Kids; Interscope
- Songwriter: Eric Lopez
- Producers: Glasear; Kimj; Whethan; Fortune Swan

Ericdoa singles chronology
"Strangers" (2021)	"Sad4whattt" (2022)	"Fool4Love" (2022)

Music video
- "Sad4whattt" on YouTube

"Sad4whattt" is a song by American musician Ericdoa, released by Interscope Records and Listen to the Kids on January 28, 2022 as the fourth single from Euphoria Season 2 (An HBO Original Series Soundtrack). The track was written by Ericdoa and produced by Glasear, Kimj, Fortune Swan, and Whethan. The record features prominently in "You Who Cannot See, Think of Those Who Can", the fourth episode of the second season of the American teen drama series Euphoria. The compilation album the song was made for was released on March 4.

== Background ==
American musician Ericdoa explained in an interview with NME that "we sent through five or six demos [to the Euphoria team] and they sifted through the pack and picked the one that I was literally not going to release." He thought the song worked in the series "because it's super high energy [...] It's super upbeat, then it takes you right back down, then up again [...] and that's what that entire season was". The song was released on January 28, 2022 by Interscope Records and Listen to the Kids, the former who produced Euphoria Season 2 (An HBO Original Series Soundtrack), which "Sad4whattt" was the fourth single to. Two days later, it was prominently featured in "You Who Cannot See, Think of Those Who Can", the fourth episode of the second season.

== Composition ==
The hyperpop song's lyrics describe not letting external factors bring you down.

== Commercial performance ==
Oliver Cannon would direct a music video for "Sad4whattt", which premiered on January 28, 2022. The video depicts Ericdoa and others doing donuts in an abandoned parking lot. Police officers intervene to find out about what the squad was doing.

== Critical response ==
Will Schube of uDiscover Music wrote that the song "is exuberant and emotional, giving eric room to ride the instrumental with joy and ferocity in equal measure. As the instrumental shudders and threatens to cave in around him, he offers an honest picture of his emotional state."

== Release history ==
Release history
Region	Date	Format	Label	Ref.
Various	January 28, 2022	Digital download; streaming	Interscope	
