= Euphoria season 2 =

2022 television series season

Euphoria
- Season 2
- Promotional poster
- Showrunner: Sam Levinson
- Starring: Zendaya; Hunter Schafer; Nika King; Eric Dane; Angus Cloud; Jacob Elordi; Algee Smith; Sydney Sweeney; Alexa Demie; Barbie Ferreira; Maude Apatow; Storm Reid; Austin Abrams; Javon "Wanna" Walton; Dominic Fike
- No. of episodes: 8

Release
- Original network: HBO
- Original release: January 9 – February 27, 2022

Season chronology
- ← Previous; Specials Next → Season 3

The second season of the American psychological teen drama television series Euphoria, inspired by Ron Leshem's miniseries of the same name, premiered on HBO on January 9, 2022. Series creator Sam Levinson serves as showrunner for the season. The season centers on addict teenager Rue Bennett as she navigates difficult choices. Zendaya stars as Rue alongside an ensemble cast consisting of Hunter Schafer, Nika King, Eric Dane, Angus Cloud, Jacob Elordi, Algee Smith, Sydney Sweeney, Alexa Demie, Barbie Ferreira, Maude Apatow, Storm Reid, Austin Abrams, Javon "Wanna" Walton, and Dominic Fike.

In July 2019, Euphoria was renewed for a second season. Filming commenced in April 2021 and wrapped in November. The season consists of eight episodes, and generally received critical acclaim. At the 74th Primetime Emmy and Creative Arts Awards the season was nominated sixteen times and received nine statues. Most notably Zendaya won a second Outstanding Lead Actress in a Drama Series and the series gained an Outstanding Drama Series nomination. The season was followed by a third and final season released in 2026.

== Cast and characters ==
=== Main ===
- Zendaya as Rue Bennett
- Hunter Schafer as Jules Vaughn
- Nika King as Leslie Bennett
- Eric Dane as Cal Jacobs
- Angus Cloud as Fezco O'Neill
- Jacob Elordi as Nate Jacobs
- Algee Smith as Chris McKay
- Sydney Sweeney as Cassie Howard
- Alexa Demie as Maddy Perez
- Barbie Ferreira as Kat Hernandez
- Maude Apatow as Lexi Howard
- Storm Reid as Gia Bennett
- Austin Abrams as Ethan Daley
- Javon "Wanna" Walton as Ashtray
- Dominic Fike as Elliot

=== Recurring ===
- Tyler Chase as Custer
- Martha Kelly as Laurie
- Chloe Cherry as Faye Valentine
- Melvin "Bonez" Estes as Bruce Sr.
- Ansel Pierce as Caleb
- Minka Kelly as Samantha
- Alanna Ubach as Suze Howard
- Paula Marshall as Marsha Jacobs
- Nick Blood as Gus Howard
- Colman Domingo as Ali Muhammad
- Sophia Rose Wilson as BB
- Yukon Clement as Theo
- Fernando Belo as Sebastian
- Zak Steiner as Aaron Jacobs
- Veronica Taylor as Bobbi
- Gwen Mukes as Leslie's Mom

== Episodes ==
No. overall	No. in season	Title	Directed by	Written by	Original release date	U.S. viewers (millions)
11	1	"Trying to Get to Heaven Before They Close the Door"	Sam Levinson	Sam Levinson	January 9, 2022	0.254
As a child, Fezco O'Neill is taken under his grandmother Marie's wing and introduced to the illegal drug trade. A baby Ashtray is abandoned by his addict mother. Fezco experiences a traumatic head injury from a crowbar accident. In the present, Ashtray kills Mouse with a hammer. Several weeks later, on New Year's Eve, an intoxicated Rue Bennett accompanies Fezco and Ashtray to a harrowing drug deal with associates of retired-schoolteacher-turned-dealer Laurie, before attending a large house party. After encountering each other at a convenience store, Nate Jacobs and Cassie Howard impulsively have sex in a bathroom at the party and are nearly caught by Maddy Perez. Rue takes a spate of drugs with fellow addict student named Elliot and nearly overdoses. She reunites with Jules Vaughn and admits to relapsing the night Jules left her at the train station. The two later confess their feelings for one another and kiss. Fezco flatters Cassie's younger sister Lexi and gets her number, then confronts Nate, whom he viciously beats until the other guests stop him.
12	2	"Out of Touch"	Sam Levinson	Sam Levinson	January 16, 2022	0.279
Nate recovers from his beating at the hospital, refusing to tell his parents Cal and Marsha who attacked him. Cassie, who has experienced a major depressive episode since her abortion, continues seeing Nate despite knowing it could ruin her friendship with Maddy, whom Nate used to date. Jules becomes insecure about Rue's friendship with Elliot, unaware the two have been regularly taking drugs together. After encountering an intoxicated Rue at their Narcotics Anonymous meeting, Ali drives her home and meets her family. Kat Hernandez's interest in Ethan Daley begins to wane over her own issues with self-esteem. Cal investigates Nate's assault and pressures Cassie into naming Fezco as the attacker. He later confronts Nate, who responds by revealing he knows of his father's secret sexual exploits, including the video of him and Jules having sex.
13	3	"Ruminations: Big and Little Bullys"	Sam Levinson	Sam Levinson	January 23, 2022	0.264
As a teenager, Cal is attracted to his friend Derek while dating his future wife, Marsha. Derek reciprocates his feelings, but Marsha's unexpected pregnancy compels Cal to stay with her and hide his sexual orientation. In the present, Jules forgoes her insecurity about Elliot and Rue, becoming friends with Elliot. Rue develops a plan to hide her drug use from her little sister Gia. When she runs out of drugs, she convinces Laurie to give her a large stash, ostensibly for Rue to sell. Ali becomes suspicious of Rue, causing a heated argument that leads them to cut ties. Cassie becomes further isolated due to her obsession with Nate. Lexi channels her frustrations with Cassie and Rue, as well as her own loneliness, into writing a play to stage at school. Cal visits Fezco, thinking he has the video of Jules, but Ashtray beats him into admitting his indiscretions. Fez lets him go on the condition that he stops hunting him and keeps Nate away from Rue and Jules. Nate cancels plans with Cassie to rekindle his relationship with Maddy.
14	4	"You Who Cannot See, Think of Those Who Can"	Sam Levinson	Sam Levinson	January 30, 2022	0.318
While by themselves one night, Jules and Elliot kiss. Cassie and Nate's relationship becomes strained after he admits to having resumed talking to Maddy. The Howards host a birthday party for Maddy, where Cassie gets exceedingly drunk and later vomits in the hot tub as Maddy is yelling at Nate for always smooth-talking her back into a relationship. Rue, Jules, and Elliot rob a convenience store for hard seltzer. Jules questions Rue for drinking alcohol, angering Rue and compelling her to go back home. She pops four pills and hallucinates her father in a church. Cal gets drunk and drives to the gay bar where he first kissed Derek; after getting thrown out, he returns home, drunkenly berates his family for not allowing him to be open about his sexuality, and abruptly decides to leave them. Elliot discloses Rue's ongoing drug use to Jules. Jules is devastated but sleeps with Elliot nonetheless.
15	5	"Stand Still Like the Hummingbird"	Sam Levinson	Sam Levinson	February 6, 2022	0.353
Rue's suitcase of drugs she acquired from Laurie is missing; her mother Leslie, who learned of her relapse from Jules, reveals she threw it out. Rue in turn has a violent meltdown at her mother and sister, as well as Jules and Elliot, who are there for the intervention. On the car ride to rehab, she runs away and goes to Lexi and Cassie's house; her mother and friends are there for the intervention. Rue reveals Cassie and Nate's relationship, causing chaos and allowing her to get away. She goes to Fezco's place, but he throws her out when she tries stealing Marie's medication. She burgles a house, getting cash and jewelry to start paying back Laurie for the drugs. Reeling from withdrawal, Rue narrowly outruns and hides from the police, and reaches Laurie's apartment. Laurie mothers Rue, giving her a bath and morphine for the pain, but implies she will force Rue to prostitute herself to pay her debts. Rue wakes up early the next morning, sneaks out of the apartment, and returns home.
16	6	"A Thousand Little Trees of Blood"	Sam Levinson	Sam Levinson	February 13, 2022	0.283
Two weeks after returning home, Rue makes progress in recovering from withdrawal, reconciling with Ali in the process. Kat breaks up with Ethan, who confronts her for being dishonest and absent in their relationship. Cassie and Nate struggle with their secret being out and argue with their mothers. Cassie's stress makes Lexi wonder how her play will be received. Fezco is housing Faye Valentine, the girlfriend of his associate Custer, whom he hasn't seen since the deal with Laurie; Custer privately meets Faye and reveals he is a police informant working to bring down Fezco and Ashtray for Mouse's murder. Nate goes to Maddy's house and forces her at gunpoint to give up the disc containing the video of Cal and Jules. He then gives Jules the disc, apologizing for his past behavior; the two admit the feelings they expressed to each other by texting the previous year were genuine. Leslie learns no inpatient facility has room for Rue and breaks down, fearing Rue will kill herself without treatment.
17	7	"The Theater and Its Double"	Sam Levinson	Sam Levinson	February 20, 2022	0.350
A young Lexi and Cassie spend time with their high father Gus. In the present, Nate has a nightmare about his father, Jules destroys the disc he gave her, Maddy quits her job babysitting, and Leslie tells Rue she is done dealing with her addiction and plans to focus on Gia. Lexi's play, Our Life, is performed for East Highland's students, parents, and faculty; the students quickly realize the play is based on their lives. The play shows various significant events from Lexi's perspective, such as Rue's father's wake, Cassie's puberty, Rue's and Lexi's friendship, Cassie and Maddy's friendship, and Maddy and Nate's relationship. Fez fails to make it to the play despite promising Lexi he would be there. Ethan, playing Nate, performs a homoerotic dance with actors plays East Highland's high school football. An offended Nate storms out of the play and angrily breaks up with Cassie, who is enraged.
18	8	"All My Life, My Heart Has Yearned for a Thing I Cannot Name"	Sam Levinson	Sam Levinson	February 27, 2022	0.625
Cassie disrupts the play when she rushes the stage and berates Lexi, only to be chased backstage and attacked by Maddy. Lexi finishes her play with the crew's and audience's support. While getting ready to attend Lexi's play, Fezco is visited by Custer, who is wearing a covert listening device. Ashtray realizes Custer is a police informant and fatally stabs him, while Fezco destroys his phone. A SWAT team storms the house; Ashtray locks himself in the bathroom and engages in a shootout with them. Fezco is wounded during the altercation and arrested, while Ashtray is killed. Nate confronts Cal with a flash drive containing all of Cal's explicit videos, before the police, tipped off by Nate, come to arrest Cal. In the aftermath of their brawl, Cassie confesses to Maddy that Nate dumped her, to which she responds that this is just the beginning of what Cassie will have to endure. After the play, Jules tells Rue that she loves and misses her, to which Rue responds by kissing her on the head before leaving in silence; Jules cries alone. Rue narrates that she stayed sober for the rest of the school year and is cautiously optimistic about the future.

== Production ==
=== Development ===
Sam Levinson's adaptation of the Israeli television series Euphoria created by Ron Leshem was renewed for a second season on July 11, 2019. The first read-through commenced on March 11, 2020. Production was delayed by the COVID-19 pandemic. In October, HBO announced two one-hour Specials to "bridge the gap". These bottle episodes released in December 2020 and January 2021. In the meantime, Levinson almost entirely rewrote the second season between the time it was supposed to start shooting and when it actually did. Rue Bennett's actress Zendaya said that "there are very few things that remain in the version that you are now seeing." She added that "the things that didn’t make it definitely needed to die."

=== Casting ===
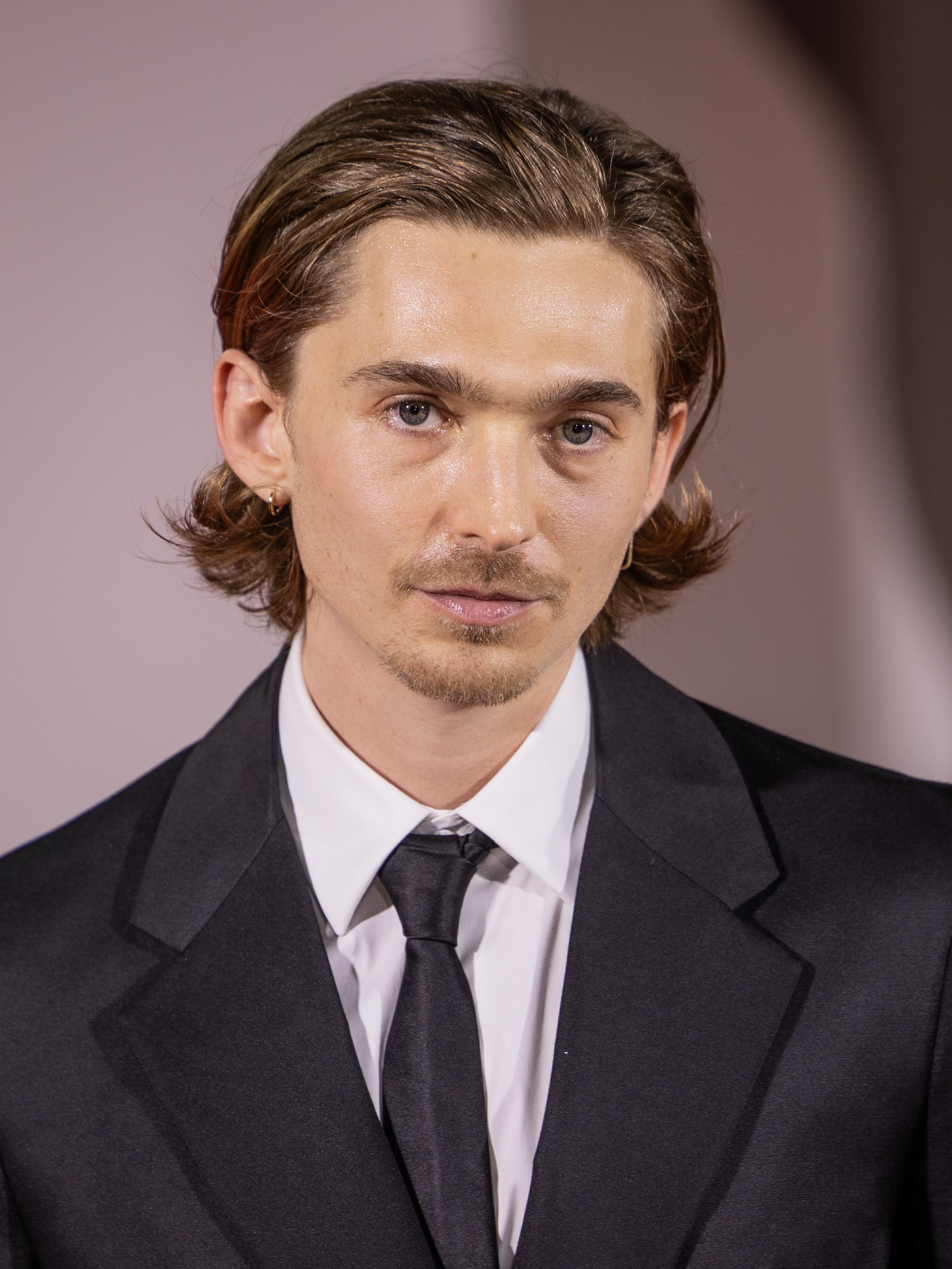
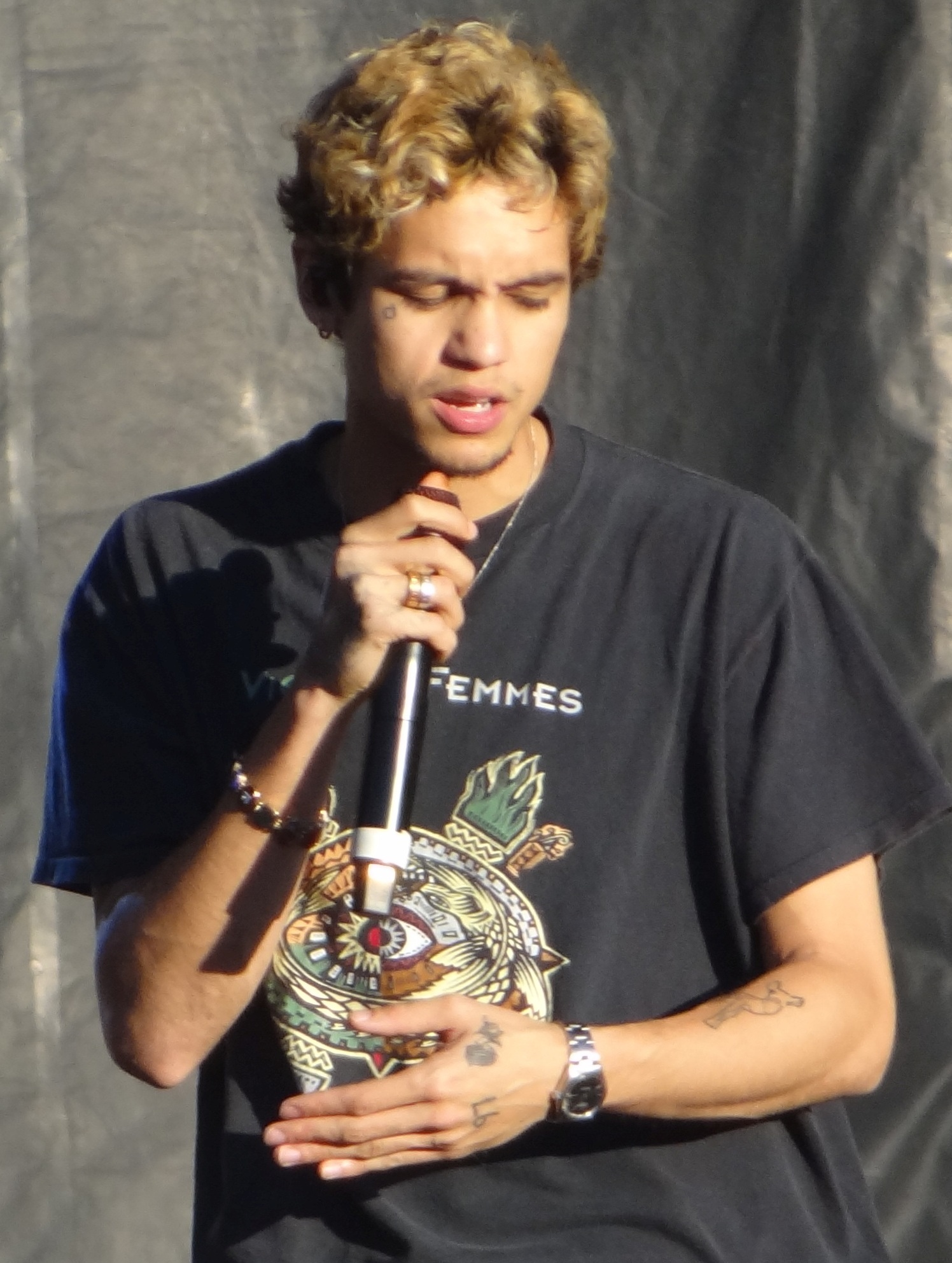
Austin Abrams and Dominic Fike joined Euphoria's main cast in season 2.

All of the main cast from season 1 returned for season 2. Previous recurring characters Ethan Daley (Austin Abrams) and Ashtray (Javon "Wanna" Walton) were upgraded to the main cast. Dominic Fike originally auditioned for season 1 when casting director Jennifer Venditti asked him to come in and read a Mark Wahlberg scene from Boogie Nights (1997). Despite initial self-doubt, Fike made it to the final round of auditions before his character was written out of the show. A year later, HBO reached out again, and Fike auditioned for a bigger role, a character he says reminds him of his younger self. Prior to landing the recurring character of Faye, Chloe Cherry starred as Jules in a pornographic parody film of Euphoria, with fellow porn actress Jenna Foxx playing Rue. Levinson found her on Instagram and thought it was funny, so she was cast. Martha Kelly, who plays Laurie had previously appeared in Zendaya starring project Spider-Man: Homecoming as a tour guide who doesn't share a scene with MJ. In April 2020, Kelvin Harrison Jr. joined the cast, but by May 2021, he had dropped out due to scheduling conflicts as a result of the COVID-19 pandemic. In a January 3, 2026 interview, Odessa A'zion confirmed that she auditioned for a role in the second season but after production was halted due to the pandemic, the role went to another actor. Actor Charlie Wright also auditioned for roles in the second season.

=== Filming ===
Principal photography for season 2 of Euphoria began filming on April 5, 2021 and wrapped November 25. Much of the show is filmed on sound stages, provided to production by Sony Pictures Studios in Culver City, California. Location shooting for the season took place in sites including Grant High School, Odd Ball Cabaret Showgirls in North Hills, Los Angeles, Family Donuts shop in Burbank, California, Moonlight Liquor in Burbank, California, Bowlium Lanes in Montclair, California, Hideaway Country Bar and Grill in Sylmar, Los Angeles, Favorite Liquor in Burbank.

Continuing a visual decision made in the specials, the entirety of season 2 was shot on 35 mm movie film. Kodak agreed to reopen parts of their factory to make showrunner Levinson's request for new Ektachrome reels possible. Director of photography Marcell Rév told IndieWire that "we weren’t interested in imitating something we had already done. We took the visuals to their extremes in season 1, but for season 2 we wanted to dig a little deeper rather than broadening the visual horizons.

After accusations of "hellish" working conditions, HBO released a statement, "The well-being of cast and crew on our productions is always a top priority. The production was in full compliance with all safety guidelines and guild protocols. It’s not uncommon for drama series to have complex shoots, and COVID protocols add an additional layer. We maintain an open line of communication with all the guilds, including SAG-AFTRA. There were never any formal inquiries raised."

=== Music ===
Adam Leber and Jen Malone are the music supervisors for the series Malone told Business Insider that "you can have the most perfect song for the scene, but if you can't clear it and you can't afford it, you can't use it." A compilation album with fifteen tracks from the season was released by Interscope Records on March 4, 2022. A soundtrack album with twenty four tracks (plus the song "Mount Everest" from season) was released by Columbia Records on April 22, 2022. The album features guest vocals from Zendaya, Cloud, and Fike. This was the final Euphoria score composed by British musician Labrinth, as he would leave the show during the production of the third season due to a behind-the scenes feud with Levinson.

== Release ==
Season 2 was promoted with the tagline "Remember this feeling". Many of the episode titles are references to works of surrealism that correlate to the episode itself. The season had its red carpet premiere on January 5, 2022. In the United States, the season premiered on January 9, 2022, and concluded on February 27. In the United Kingdom and the Republic of Ireland, each episode was released at the same time as its U.S. premiere, through Sky Atlantic's streaming service Now. The season was also released on streaming services Foxtel and Binge in Australia and Neon in New Zealand. The season was included in a DVD collection with season 1 and the specials in November 2022.

== Reception ==
=== Critical response ===
Professional ratings
Aggregate scores
Source	Rating
Rotten Tomatoes	78%
Metacritic	74/100
Review scores
Source	Rating
The Guardian	2/5 stars
Rolling Stone	3/5 stars
USA Today	2/5 stars

For the most part, Euphoria season 2 was met with a positive response from critics, with praise for Zendaya and the ensemble's acting and the visuals. However, it met with controversy for the pacing, characterization and handling of mature subject matter. The critical consensus on review aggregator website Rotten Tomatoes, reads "as willfully provocative as ever in its second season, Euphoria still isn't for all tastes—but when its addictive ingredients are mixed just right, the results remain intoxicating." The season has an as overall approval rating of 78%, with an average rating of 6.9/10 based on 113 critical reviews. Using a weighted average, Metacritic, assigned the season a score of 74 out of 100, based on 19 critics, which it describes as "Generally Favorable".

Shirley Li wrote in The Atlantic that "the show has devolved into aesthetically pleasing social-media fodder for cynics and disaffected teens." In a two out of five star review for The Guardian, Rebecca Nicholson criticised that the season had "far too much nudity, sex and violence", she commiserated that "Euphoria has returned as a more superficial version of itself – which is appropriate, I suppose, for some of its more screen-obsessed protagonists. But beneath its cold Bret Easton Ellis styling, there is emotional depth. If only it could find it again." Lovia Gyarkye for The Hollywood Reporter was positive on the season's portrayal of addiction, writing: "Even Levinson’s messages about love and goodness gain greater vivacity when applied to Rue’s addiction. [...] Desperate, impractical, painful and pellucid, it reminds us that despite Euphoria’s effortful thrills and frills, the series is most worth watching for Rue’s journey."

NPR's Eric Deggans wrote that the season "is more than a parent's worst nightmare. It's a creative triumph." He added that "Euphoria somehow manages to make you keep caring about often-unlikeable folks on such brutal and dark journeys, is a testament to the uniquely creative voice distilled in each episode. It is thrilling, daring, disquieting and compelling". In a three out of five star review for Rolling Stone, Alan Sepinwall wrote that "Euphoria is great enough often enough to excuse at least some of its bad behavior — even if the show also takes after Cassie, who admits at one point, 'I keep making mistakes and not learning from them.'" USA Today's Patrick Ryan praised the performances of Zendaya, Schafer, and Fike, but wrote that "the new episodes are much less captivating when they shift their focus away from Rue and Jules". Vanity Fair's Richard Lawson wrote that the season was "too stylish for its own good", adding that "what has been refreshing about Euphoria in these times of such careful piety is that it is willing to transgress, to touch third rails and court moral danger. The second season still prods at taboo, but it inevitably does so with less of the special surprise of season 1. [...] Perhaps it’s fitting: what could be more high-school than a sophomore slump?"

=== Ratings ===
On linear television, the second season of Euphoria has an average of 340,000 US viewers per episode. Including people watching on HBO Max, season 2 episodes averaged 16,300,000 viewers, which is the best performance for any season of an HBO series over the past eighteen years, other than Game of Thrones.

=== Accolades ===
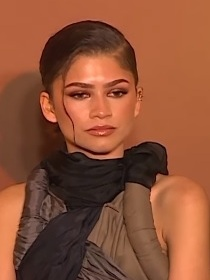
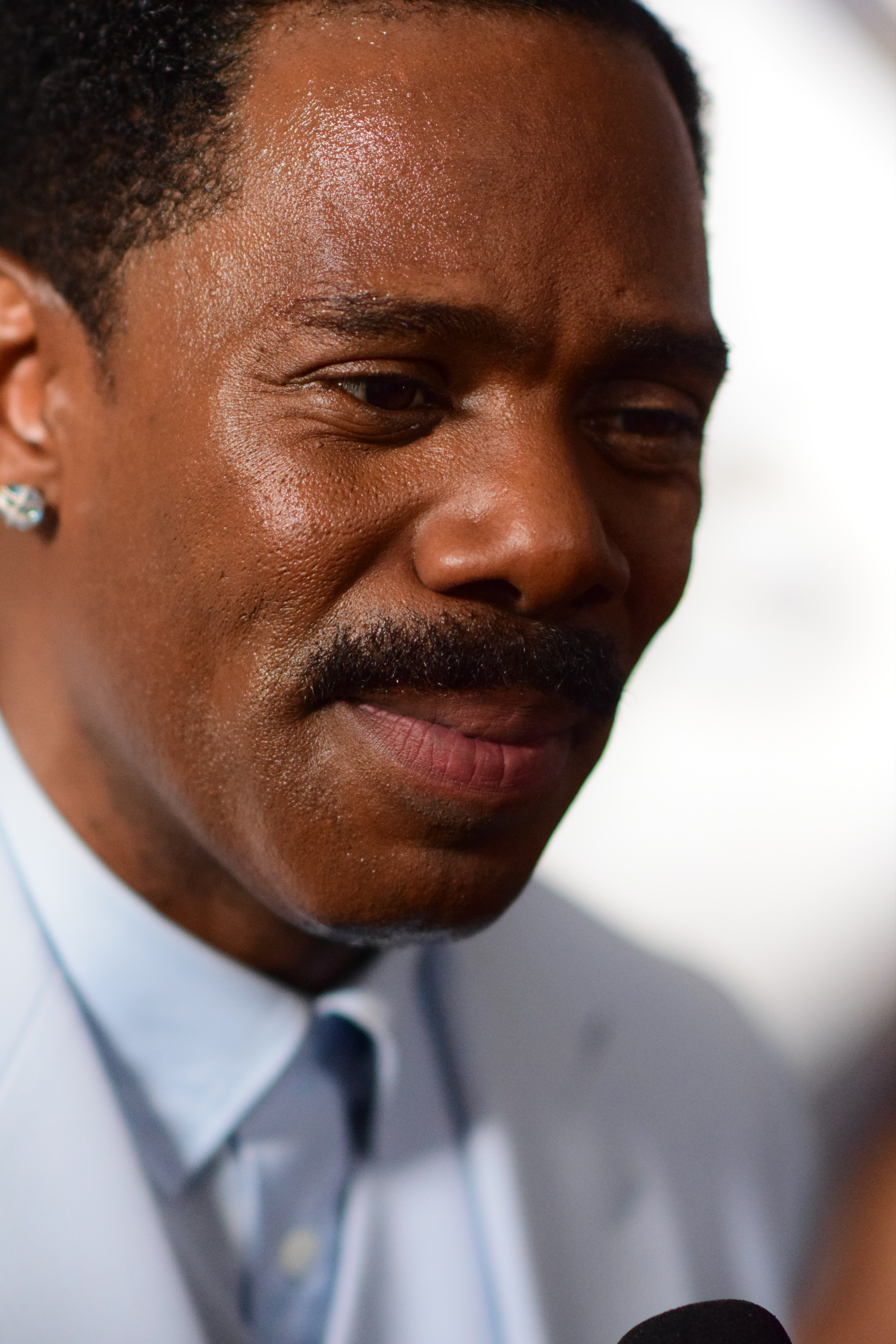
Zendaya and Colman Domingo both won Primetime Emmy Awards for season 2.

The Academy of Television Arts & Sciences acknowledged season 2 at their Primetime Emmy Award ceremonies sixteen times and gave the cast and crew nine statues. At the 74th Primetime Emmy Awards the season got three nominations; Zendaya's turn in episode five "Stand Still Like the Hummingbird" won her Outstanding Lead Actress in a Drama Series. Sydney Sweeney's turn in episode three "Ruminations: Big and Little Bullys" got her nominated for Outstanding Supporting Actress in a Drama Series, and the season overall was nominated for Outstanding Drama Series, honoring producers Levinson, his wife Ashley, Kevin Turen, Ravi Nandan, Drake, Adel "Future" Nur, Zendaya, Will Greenfield, Kenneth Yu, Harrison Kreiss, Ron Leshem and Hadas Moses Lichtenstein. At the 74th Primetime Creative Arts Emmy Awards, the season was nominated for Outstanding Casting for a Drama Series (Jessica Kelly, Mary Vernieu, Bret Howe, and Jennifer Venditti), Outstanding Contemporary Costumes (Heidi Bivens, Devon Patterson and Angelina Vitto for episode one "Trying to Get to Heaven Before They Close the Door"), Outstanding Hairstyling (Kimberly Kimble, Kendra Garvey, Patricia Vecchio, and Teresita Mariscal for episode seven "The Theater and Its Double"), Outstanding Guest Actress in a Drama Series (Martha Kelly for "Stand Still Like the Hummingbird"), Outstanding Music Supervision (Adam Leber and Jen Malone for "Trying to Get to Heaven Before They Close the Door"), two Outstanding Original Music and Lyrics ("I'm Tired" by Labrinth, Zendaya and Levinson for episode four "You Who Cannot See, Think of Those Who Can" and "Elliot's Song" by Labrinth, Muzhda Zemar-McKenzie, Zendaya for episode eight "All My Life, My Heart Has Yearned for a Thing I Cannot Name"), and Outstanding Sound Mixing for a Comedy or Drama Series (One-Hour) (Anne Jimkes-Root, Chris David, Austin Roth, and Sean O'Malley for "Stand Still Like the Hummingbird"). At the ceremony, the season also won five awards, three for episode seven, one for episode three and one for both. For "The Theater and Its Double", Marcell Rév won Outstanding Cinematography for a Series (One Hour), Laura Zempel, Julio C. Perez IV, Nikola Boyanov, and Aaron I. Butler won Outstanding Picture Editing for a Drama Series, and Doniella Davy, Tara Lang Shah, and Alex French won Outstanding Makeup (Non-Prosthetic). For "Ruminations: Big and Little Bullys" Colman Domingo won Outstanding Guest Actor in a Drama Series. For the "Call Me Irresponsible" routine from episode three and "Holding Out for a Hero" and cheerleader routines from episode seven Ryan Heffington won Outstanding Choreography.
