= Elliot's Song =

Single by Dominic Fike and Zendaya

from the album Euphoria Season 2 (An HBO Original Series Soundtrack) and Euphoria Season 2 Official Score (From the HBO Original Series)
- Released: March 4, 2022
- Genre: Ballad
- Length: 2:30
- Label: Columbia Records
- Songwriters: Timothy McKenzie; Muzhda Zemar-McKenzie; Zendaya Coleman
- Producer: Labrinth

Dominic Fike singles chronology
"The Kiss of Venus (Featuring Dominic Fike)" (2021)	"Elliot's Song" (2022)	"Dancing in the Courthouse" (2023)

Zendaya singles chronology
"I'm Tired" (2022)	"Elliot's Song" (2022)

Music video
- "Elliot's Song" on YouTube

"Elliot's Song" is a song by American singers Dominic Fike and Zendaya, released on March 4, 2022 by Columbia Records as the seventh and final single from Euphoria Season 2 (An HBO Original Series Soundtrack). The track was written by Labrinth, his girlfriend Muzhda Zemar-McKenzie, and Zendaya. The record features prominently in "All My Life, My Heart Has Yearned for a Thing I Cannot Name" the second season finale of American teen drama series Euphoria. The song was also included on Euphoria Season 2 Official Score (From the HBO Original Series). At the 74th Primetime Creative Arts Emmy Awards, the song was nominated for Outstanding Original Music and Lyrics.

== Background ==
On February 27, 2022, the ballad was performed on acoustic guitar by Dominic Fike's character Elliot in "All My Life, My Heart Has Yearned for a Thing I Cannot Name", the second season finale of American teen drama series Euphoria, in which he "serenaded" Zendaya's character, protagonist Rue Bennett. The scene received criticism and was made into a meme due to its length.

On March 4, Columbia Records released the song as the seventh and final single from Euphoria Season 2 (An HBO Original Series Soundtrack). On April 22, a version of the song with lines sung by Zendaya was included on Euphoria Season 2 Official Score (From the HBO Original Series).

== Composition ==
The song was written by season 1 and 2 composer, British musician Labrinth, his girlfriend Muzhda "Muz" Zemar-McKenzie, and Zendaya.

== Accolades ==
At the 74th Primetime Creative Arts Emmy Awards, Labrinth, Zemar-McKenzie, and Zendaya were nominated for the Primetime Emmy Award for Outstanding Original Music and Lyrics for their work on "Elliot's Song" in "All My Life, My Heart Has Yearned for a Thing I Cannot Name". Fike was nominated for Best Song at the 2022 MTV Movie & TV Awards.

== Charts ==
Chart performance for "Elliot's Song"
Chart (2022)	Peak position
Australia (ARIA)	66
Canada Hot 100 (Billboard)	77
Global 200 (Billboard)	147
Ireland (IRMA)	51
New Zealand Hot Singles (RMNZ)	3
Portugal (AFP)	165
Sweden (Sverigetopplistan)	92
UK Singles (OCC)	91
US Bubbling Under Hot 100 (Billboard)	6
US Hot Rock & Alternative Songs (Billboard)	10
