= Labrinth =

British retired singer (born 1989)

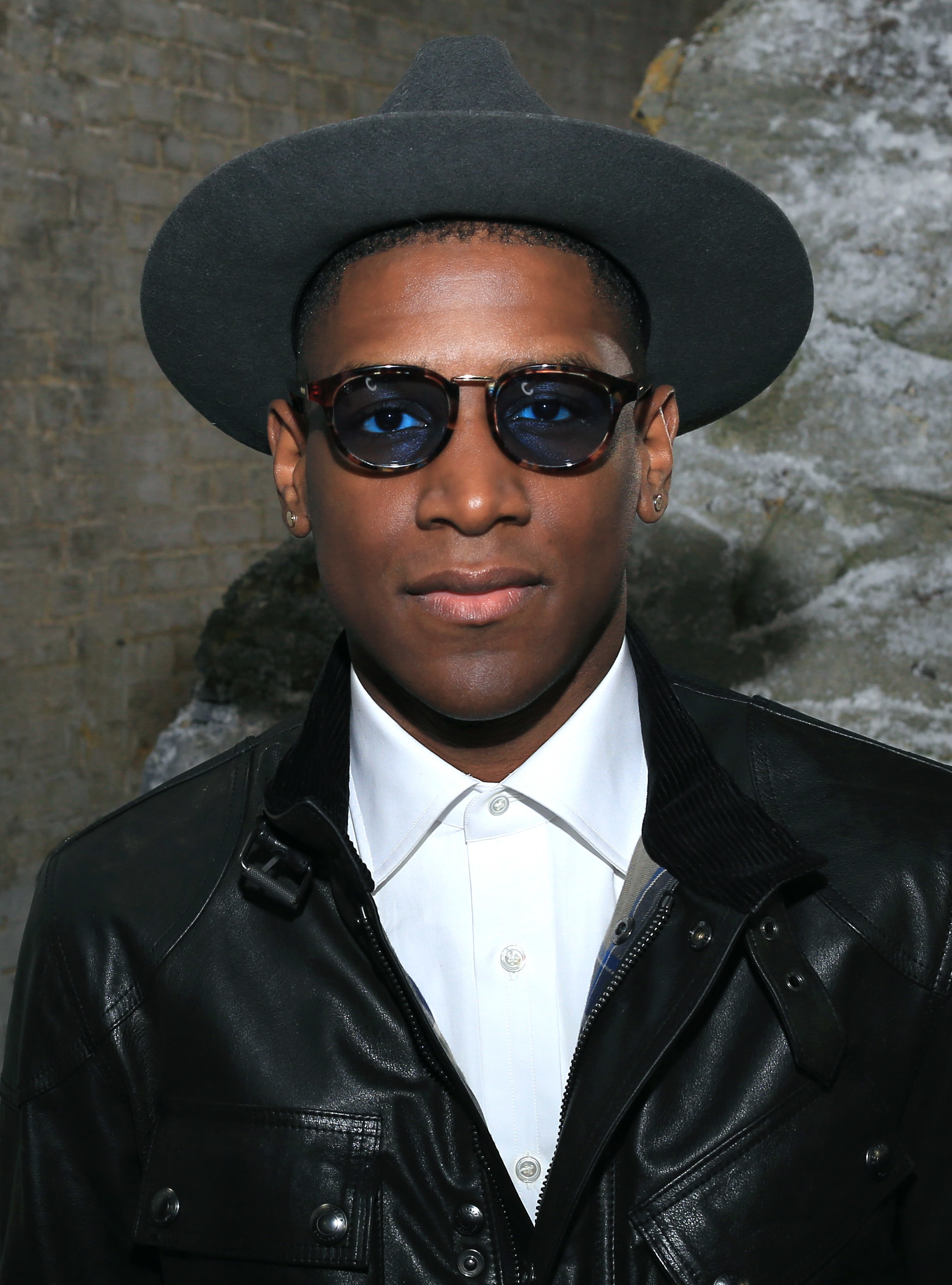
- Labrinth in 2016

Background information
- Born: Timothy Lee McKenzie; 4 January 1989 (age 37); Hackney, London, England
- Genres: Pop; R&B; hip-hop; electronic; grime; soul; rock; funk
- Occupations: Singer; songwriter; rapper; record producer
- Instrument: Vocals • keyboards
- Years active: 2009–present
- Labels: Columbia; RCA; Syco
- Formerly of: LSD
- Website: labrinth.com

Timothy Lee McKenzie (born 4 January 1989), better known by his stage name Labrinth, is a British singer, songwriter, composer, and record producer. Labrinth signed as a recording artist with Simon Cowell's record label Syco Music in 2010, initially collaborating with the English rapper Tinie Tempah. He appeared as a featured artist: uncredited on the single "Pass Out", but later officially on "Frisky"; then he released his first solo single, "Let the Sun Shine" in September. All three songs peaked in the top five on the UK Singles Chart.

His debut album, Electronic Earth (2012), peaked at number two on the UK Albums Chart and spawned four top five singles there. The single "Beneath Your Beautiful" became his first song to reach the top 40 on the US Billboard Hot 100, and peaked at number one in the United Kingdom, also receiving a nomination for Best British Single at the Brit Awards. In November 2014, he released the single "Jealous", which was later certified Platinum in the UK.

In 2018, Labrinth formed the supergroup LSD with Australian singer Sia and American DJ and producer Diplo. The group released their self-titled debut album the following year. Also in 2019, in October, he composed the score and produced the soundtrack for the first season of the HBO drama series Euphoria. His work received two Primetime Emmy Award nominations, winning one for the single "All for Us". His second album, Imagination & the Misfit Kid, followed in November. Labrinth also produced Euphoria season 2's soundtrack and composed the score, earning him an additional two Emmy nominations, for the songs "I'm Tired" and "Elliot's Song", both written alongside Zendaya.

He has been referred to as "one of the most important British musicians of his generation". Labrinth has worked with numerous artists as a songwriter and producer including Beyoncé, Rihanna, Nicki Minaj, Eminem, Kanye West, and the Weeknd. His production work on the Weeknd's album Beauty Behind the Madness earned him a Grammy Award for Album of the Year nomination. He also co-produced the soundtrack The Lion King: The Gift, and co-wrote the single "Spirit", alongside Beyoncé and Ilya Salmanzadeh, for which he received nominations at the Grammy Awards, Golden Globe Awards, and the Critics' Choice Movie Awards.

== Early life ==
McKenzie was born and raised in Hackney, London, and is of Jamaican descent. He comes from a family of musicians and has eight siblings. Their home was filled with the sound of black gospel music, which their parents loved. When young, he and his eight siblings formed a band called Mac 9. He attended Stoke Newington School and began to pursue a musical career during his school years. His brother, Mac, who is also a music producer, introduced McKenzie at the age of 15 to the art of creating music in his studio. His cousin is the Irish boxer Tommy McCarthy.

== Career ==
=== 2009–2010: Career beginnings ===
Labrinth started his career by producing the track "Dead End" for recording artist Master Shortie from the album A.D.H.D. (2009). The track generated interest in McKenzie as a producer and songwriter. Guy Moot of EMI Music Publishing offered the artist a publishing deal. From 2010 to 2011, Labrinth mentored the Urban Development Vocal Collective (UDVC) alongside his sister, ShezAr. He also produced multiple tracks for the collective, contributing towards a nine-track project titled Urban Development. The vocalists also provided backing vocals for Labrinth's original tracks.

McKenzie appeared as an uncredited guest artist on British rapper Tinie Tempah's debut single, "Pass Out", released on 28 February 2010. He had also produced and co-written the track. The single debuted at number-one on the UK Singles Chart, number six on the Irish Singles Chart, and number seventy in Australia. Having spent two weeks at the summit in the United Kingdom, "Pass Out" was awarded Best British Single at the 2011 Brit Awards and Best Contemporary Song at the 2011 Ivor Novello Awards. It achieved platinum certification from the British Phonographic Industry for surpassing sales of 600,000 copies. Several months later the two artists collaborated for a second time in the release of Tempah's second single, "Frisky", also co-written and produced by McKenzie. The single debuted at number two in the United Kingdom, beaten only by the charity single "Shout" by Dizzee Rascal and James Corden. The track had chart success in Scotland, where it became the duo's second consecutive number one single, also peaking at number three in Ireland.

Throughout 2010, McKenzie continued writing material for a number of high-profile artists, including Professor Green for the track "Oh My God" (Alive Till I'm Dead), Ola Svensson for the track "Let It Hit You" (Ola), and Loick Essien for "Love Drunk" (Identity).

=== 2010–2012: Signing to Syco and Electronic Earth ===
Following chart success as a writer and producer, McKenzie was approached in June 2010 and signed to Simon Cowell's record label, Syco. The signing marked a milestone for the label, with McKenzie becoming the first signing in six years who had not gained exposure on one of Cowell's reality talent shows. Through Syco, Labrinth released his debut single, "Let the Sun Shine", on 27 September 2010 in the United Kingdom. The track debuted at number three in the UK, also reaching number thirty-two in Ireland. Labrinth was featured as an artist a third time on 3 January 2011, with the release of British rapper Devlin's single "Let It Go". This had limited chart success, peaking at number fifty-nine in the UK. He also participated in a remake of Charles Wright & the Watts 103rd Street Rhythm Band's "Express Yourself".

Over the course of the next year, Labrinth produced tracks by Yasmin and Ms. Dynamite, as well as the 2011 Children in Need charity single “Teardrop”, on which he also appeared as a guest performer. The single, which was performed both at Children in Need 2011 and Children in Need Rocks Manchester on 17 November 2011 debuted at number twenty-four on the UK Singles Chart.

Labrinth released his second single, "Earthquake", on 23 October 2011 – featuring long-term collaborator Tinie Tempah. The single debuted at number two on the UK chart with first week sales of 115,530 copies – the second highest selling number-two behind X Factor winners Little Mix and their cover of Damien Rice's "Cannonball". The track also saw international chart success, peaking at number twelve in Ireland, number five in New Zealand and number twenty-one in Australia; achieving gold certification from the Australian Recording Industry Association and platinum certification from the Recording Industry Association of New Zealand. Following a third single release, "Last Time", which was released on 18 March 2012 as a four-track digital EP alongside remixes from Knife Party and Gareth Emery, Labrinth released his debut album Electronic Earth on 2 April 2012.

On 23 May 2012, Labrinth performed at the Cheltenham racecourse to celebrate the occasion of the Olympic torch coming through Cheltenham. He also performed at several university shows including University of Leeds’ Summer Ball, Nottingham Trent University Graduation Ball, and University of Surrey's End of Year Show. On 29 June, Labrinth performed at VG-lista top 20 in Norway in front of a crowd consisting of 90,000 people. Labrinth also performed at GFest in Preston on 8 September 2012 to celebrate Preston Guild 2012. The song "Beneath Your Beautiful", which features Emeli Sandé was released as the album's sixth single and peaked at number one November 2012 on the UK singles chart, and was Labrinth's first entry into the Billboard Hot 100 at number 34.

In July 2012, it was revealed that Labrinth would be working with Rihanna, which resulted in him co-writing and co-producing her song "Lost In Paradise" from her album 'Unapologetic'. Labrinth also collaborated with Ed Sheeran, producing his and Devlin's single "Watchtower", which was released in August 2012. Labrinth also worked with Sheeran in 2014, and produced his single "Save Myself" from the March 2017 album ÷.

On 25 December 2012, Labrinth released the Atomic EP for free download via SoundCloud. It features Plan B, Devlin, Wretch 32, Ed Sheeran, Maxsta, Lady Leshurr and Etta Bond among others.

In a 2012 interview, OMD frontman Andy McCluskey credited Labrinth and Professor Green as "great" artists who represented "some of the small amount of music that is still actually trying to go forward".

=== 2013–2019: Collaborations and LSD ===
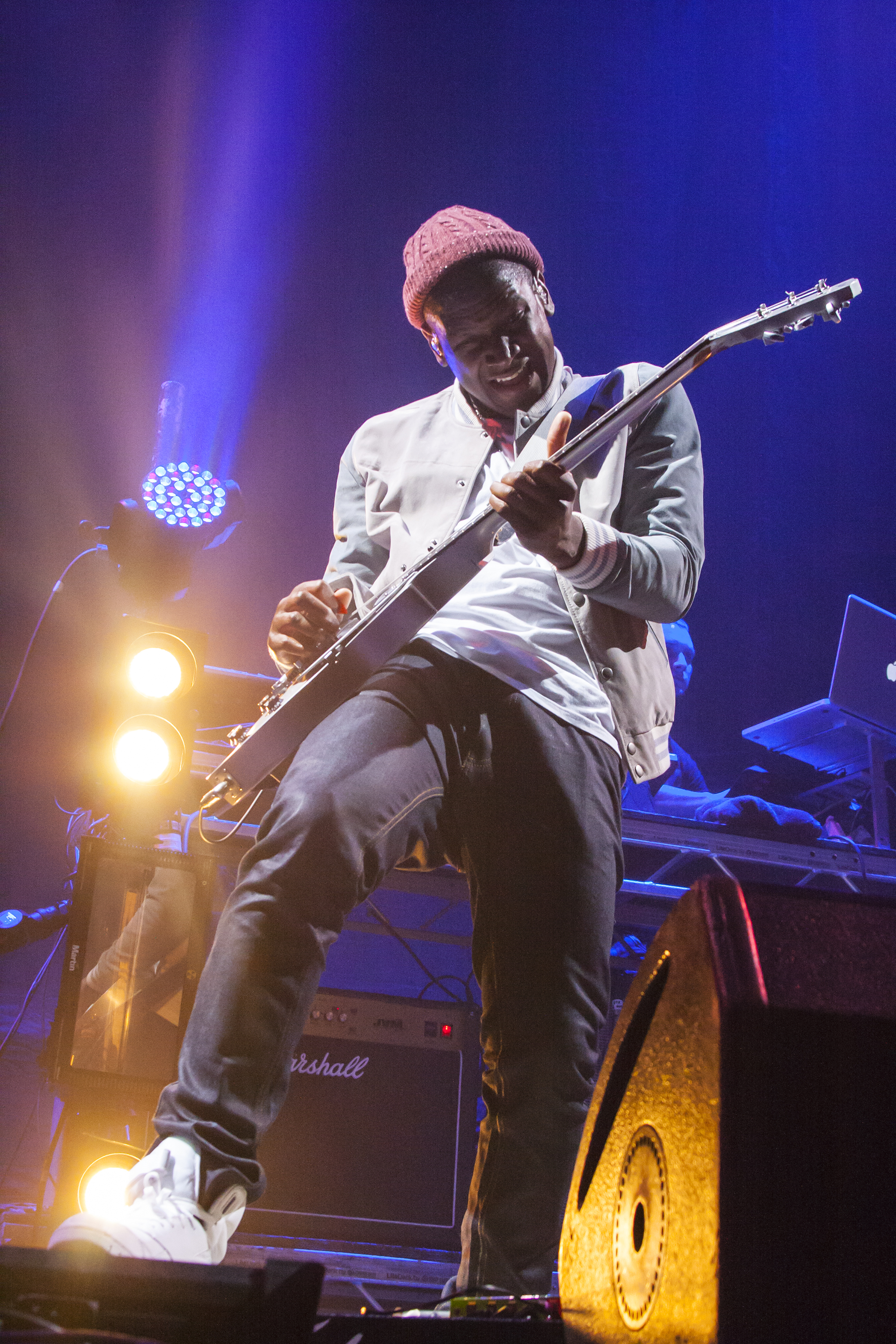
Labrinth performing in 2013

Labrinth began working on his second studio album in 2013. That year he also appeared on two tracks for Tinie Tempah's second studio album Demonstration: the third single "Lover Not a Fighter" and the album track "It's OK". In July 2013, Labrinth was picked as Elvis Duran's Artist of the Month and was featured on NBC's Today show hosted by Kathy Lee Gifford and Hoda Kotb, where he performed live his song "Beneath Your Beautiful".

In October 2014, Labrinth released his single "Jealous", which he wrote during a trip to Nashville. The song peaked at number 7 on the UK Singles Chart in December 2014. The single has received acknowledgement from a number of artists including Adele, who listened to the song to help her cry on command while shooting her "Hello" video, and Jessie Ware, who covered it for the BBC Radio 1 Live Lounge.

Released in August 2015, Labrinth features on the track "Losers", which he also co-produced, on the Weeknd's album Beauty Behind the Madness. His contribution to the album earned him his first Grammy nomination for Album of the Year at the 58th Annual Grammy Awards. Labrinth later co-produced "Stargirl Interlude" on the Weeknd's 2016 album 'Starboy'. Labrinth also did a duet on the track "Fragile", the lead promotional single from Kygo's debut studio album Cloud Nine.

In 2016, Labrinth worked alongside Mike Posner on Posner's widely successful album At Night, Alone. Labrinth is featured and co-wrote on the sixth single, "Silence". The album was officially released on 6 May 2016. "Silence" was written by both Posner and Labrinth. The song was produced by Posner and Terefe. He also produced and was featured in "Make Me (Cry)", Noah Cyrus' debut single, released on 14 November 2016. Labrinth also featured alongside Cyrus in the song's music video and performances on The Tonight Show and The Late Late Show. The single peaked at number 22 on the Billboard Hot 100 in February 2017. Over the following 2 years Labrinth and Cyrus continued collaborating, with Labrinth lending writing and production duties to Cyrus' May 2017 single "I'm Stuck", September 2017 single "Again", and August 2018 single "Live Or Die". In December 2016, Labrinth performed a medley of "Frozen" and "Like A Prayer" at the annual Billboard Women in Music event, where Madonna, who had personally selected him to perform, was honored as Woman of the Year.

In May 2017, Labrinth was featured on Sia's single "To Be Human" from the Wonder Woman soundtrack. In September 2017, Apple used Labrinth's song "Misbehaving" in their keynote to announce their Apple Watch Series 3.

On 3 May 2018, Labrinth was announced as a member of the supergroup LSD along with Sia and music producer Diplo. It was the first time the three artists have worked together on a single project. According to Diplo, LSD started when he was invited into the studio to write with Labrinth and Sia. Their first single, "Genius", was released via Columbia Records in the US and Syco Music in the UK the same day, along with a psychedelic cartoon visual and the announcement of a forthcoming album. LSD released their second single "Audio" the next week and their third single "Thunderclouds" in August, followed by a "Thunderclouds" music video featuring dancer and previous Sia collaborator Maddie Ziegler. The latter was used as the promotional song for the Samsung Galaxy Note 9, which helped propel it to the top of Billboard & Clio's Top TV Commercials chart for August and September 2018. It is also LSD's highest-charting single to date, peaking at number 67 on the Billboard Hot 100 and number 17 on the UK Singles Chart. In November 2018, the three received a Grammy Award nomination for Best Remixed Recording for their song "Audio (CID Remix Official Dance Remix)". Also in 2018, Labrinth co-produced and featured on Nicki Minaj's track "Majesty" featuring Eminem, which peaked at number 58 on the Billboard Hot 100.

In January 2019, Labrinth starred in a Mini Countryman ad, in which he sings a version of “Don't Fence Me In”. A full version of the song was also released with the campaign launch. Following the release of their single "Mountains", LSD released their debut album Labrinth, Sia & Diplo Present... LSD on 12 April 2019. That month the group released a video for "No New Friends" featuring Maddie Ziegler and made their first live appearance performing the song on Ellen.

=== 2019–2022: Euphoria and Imagination & the Misfit Kid ===
Following the release of his single "Miracle" in June 2019, Labrinth made his scoring debut when he was announced as the lead composer for season 1 of the HBO drama series Euphoria. Inspired by some of the music that Labrinth's manager Adam Leber had shared with him, the show's creator Sam Levinson approached Labrinth to contribute music for the series while he was working on his second solo album. Several of Labrinth's original songs are also featured throughout the season's soundtrack, including "Mount Everest" and "All for Us" featuring vocals from the show's lead actress Zendaya. The season's score was released on 4 October 2019 via Milan Records and Sony Masterworks. Characterized as "a mash-up of electronic, R&B, dance and hip-hop sounds", Labrinth's score was positively received and received praise for "perfectly complementing the journey of the main character." The following year, Labrinth received two Primetime Emmy Award nominations for his work in Euphoria; Outstanding Music Composition for a Series for the episode "'03 Bonnie and Clyde" and Outstanding Original Music And Lyrics for the song "All for Us", winning the latter as well as an Ivor Novello Award for Best Television Soundtrack.

Labrinth co-wrote and produced Beyoncé's July 2019 single "Spirit" from the soundtrack of the photorealistic remake of The Lion King and companion album The Lion King: The Gift. The single charted on the Billboard Hot 100, was nominated for Grammy and Golden Globe awards, and was shortlisted for the Best Original Song Academy Award. That year Labrinth also collaborated with Kanye West, co-producing and lending vocals to "God Is" from his October 2019 album Jesus Is King.

On 31 October 2019, Labrinth announced his sophomore studio album titled Imagination & the Misfit Kid with the single release "Where the Wild Things". The 15 track album, which features guest appearances from Zendaya and Sia, was released on 22 November 2020. The single "Imagination" was used in Apple's "Made in the UK" advert in July 2020. As part of Apple's 'Behind the Mac' series, the ad features UK creative talent working at MacBook laptops including Labrinth himself.

On 9 October 2020, Labrinth released his single "No Ordinary", which was used in the Xbox Series X/S launch trailer. Labrinth also wrote and produced two singles for Sam Smith released that year including "Love Goes", which he is also featured on and comes from Smith's album of the same name, and an original Christmas song "The Lighthouse Keeper".

Labrinth composed the score for Netflix original film, Malcolm & Marie, and was featured, alongside Sia, on Major Lazer's "Titans", released in March 2021.

In 2022, he returned to composing Euphoria, for the show's second season, and also made a cameo in episode four "You Who Cannot See, Think of Those Who Can", performing the song "I'm Tired", which later featured on the soundtrack, and score. A music video for "Mount Everest" was released in April.

=== 2023–2026: Ends & Begins, The Kitchen, and Cosmic Opera: Acts I & II ===
Labrinth's third solo studio album, titled Ends & Begins, was originally scheduled for a release in October 2022, but was eventually released on 28 April 2023 by Columbia Records. It was preceded by the singles "Lift Off", "Kill for Your Love", "Iridium", and "Never Felt So Alone", although, following the album's delay, "Lift Off" and "Iridium" were removed from the tracklist.

Labrinth performed at the 22nd Coachella Valley Music and Arts Festival in April 2023, with Zendaya making a surprise appearance on his set.

In 2024, the soundtrack for the Netflix film The Kitchen was released, which featured Labrinth working with composer Alex Baranowski.

Labrinth released his fourth album Cosmic Opera: Act I on 30 January 2026 through Columbia Records.

On 13 March 2026, Labrinth announced via an Instagram post that all ties with Euphoria were severed, which at the time, he was currently contracted to compose the soundtrack alongside Hans Zimmer for its third season. The post in question read "I’m done with this industry. Fuck Columbia. Double fuck ‘Euphoria.’ I’m out. Thank you and good night." Almost a month later, he revealed in another post that he removed the music he composed for the upcoming season, commenting that he "spoke to HBO" about the decision and "as far as I know, we are cool". He also elaborated more on his exit, saying he left because "when I work for someone, their vision is paramount to me, but I don't let people treat me like shit."

== Discography ==
=== Studio albums ===
- Electronic Earth (2012)
- Imagination & the Misfit Kid (2019)
- Ends & Begins (2023)
- Cosmic Opera: Act I (2026)
- Cosmic Opera: Act II (2026)

=== Score albums ===
- Euphoria (Original Score from the HBO Series) (2019)
- Euphoria Season 2 Official Score (From the HBO Original Series) (2022)
- The Kitchen (2024)

=== Soundtrack albums ===
- Euphoria Season 1 (An HBO Original Series Soundtrack) (2021)
- Euphoria Season 2 (An HBO Original Series Soundtrack) (2022)

== Accolades ==
| Year | Award | Category | Nominated work | Result | Ref. |
|---|---|---|---|---|---|
| 2010 | Urban Music Awards | Best Collaboration | "Pass Out" (with Tinie Tempah) | Won | |
| 2011 | Brit Awards | Song of the Year | "Pass Out" (with Tinie Tempah) | Won | |
| 2012 | MOBO Awards | Best Male | | Nominated | |
| 2012 | MOBO Awards | Best R&B/Soul Act | | Nominated | |
| 2012 | MOBO Awards | Best Album | "Electronic Earth" | Nominated | |
| 2012 | MOBO Awards | Best Song | "Earthquake" (featuring Tinie Tempah) | Won | |
| 2012 | BBC Radio 1 Teen Awards | Best British Single | "Earthquake" (featuring Tinie Tempah) | Nominated | |
| 2012 | BBC Radio 1 Teen Awards | Best British Album | "Electronic Earth" | Nominated | |
| 2012 | BBC Radio 1 Teen Awards | Best British Music Act | | Nominated | |
| 2013 | Brit Awards | Song of the Year | "Beneath Your Beautiful" (featuring Emeli Sandé) | Nominated | |
| 2016 | Grammy Awards | Album of the Year | Beauty Behind the Madness (as producer) | Nominated | |
| 2017 | Radio Disney Music Award | Best Breakup Song | "Make Me (Cry)" (with Noah Cyrus) | Nominated | |
| 2019 | UK Music Video Awards | Best Pop Video - UK | "Miracle" | Nominated | |
| 2019 | Grammy Awards | Best Remixed Recording, Non-Classical | "Audio (CID Remix Official Dance Remix)" | Nominated | |
| 2019 | Golden Globe Awards | Best Original Song | "Spirit" | Nominated | |
| 2019 | Capri Hollywood International Film Festival | Best Original Song | "Spirit" | Won | |
| 2019 | Hollywood Music in Media Awards | Best Original Song in a Feature Film | "Spirit" | Nominated | |
| 2019 | Satellite Awards | Best Original Song | "Spirit" | Nominated | |
| 2019 | Critics' Choice Movie Awards | Best Song | "Spirit" | Nominated | |
| 2019 | Hawaii Film Critics Society | Best Song | "Spirit" | Nominated | |
| 2020 | Grammy Awards | Best Song Written for Visual Media | "Spirit" | Nominated | |
| 2020 | Clio Awards | Best Album Campaign | LSD: The Experience, The Game, The Album | Silver | |
| 2020 | Clio Awards | Games/Contests | LSD: The Game | Silver | |
| 2020 | Ivor Novello Awards | Best Television Soundtrack | Euphoria (Original Score from the HBO Series) | Won | |
| 2020 | Primetime Emmy Awards | Outstanding Music Composition for a Series | "'03 Bonnie and Clyde" | Nominated | |
| 2020 | Primetime Emmy Awards | Outstanding Original Music and Lyrics | "All for Us" (for "And Salt the Earth Behind You") | Won | |
| 2022 | UK Music Video Awards | Best R&B/Soul Video – UK | "Mount Everest" | Nominated | |
| 2022 | Primetime Emmy Awards | Outstanding Original Music and Lyrics | "Elliot's Song" (with Zendaya and Muz) | Nominated | |
| 2022 | Primetime Emmy Awards | Outstanding Original Music and Lyrics | "I'm Tired" (with Zendaya and Sam Levinson) | Nominated | |
| 2023 | Berlin Music Video Awards | Best Director | "Kill for Your Love" | Won | |
| 2023 | UK Music Video Awards | Best Pop Video – UK | "Kill for Your Love" | Nominated | |
| 2023 | UK Music Video Awards | Best Visual Effects in a Video | "Kill for Your Love" | Nominated | |
| 2024 | Grammy Awards | Best Pop Duo/Group Performance | "Never Felt So Alone" (featuring Billie Eilish) | Nominated | |
