= I'm Tired =

Single by Labrinth and Zendaya

from the album Euphoria Season 2 (An HBO Original Series Soundtrack) and Euphoria Season 2 Official Score (From the HBO Original Series)
- Released: 28 February 2022
- Genre: Gospel
- Length: 3:07
- Label: Columbia Records
- Songwriters: Timothy McKenzie; Sam Levinson; Zendaya Coleman
- Producer: Labrinth

Labrinth singles chronology
"Yeh I Fuckin' Did It" (2022)	"I'm Tired" (2022)	"Lift Off" (2022)

Zendaya singles chronology
"All for Us" (2019)	"I'm Tired" (2022)	"Elliot's Song" (2022)

Music video
- "I'm Tired" on YouTube

"I'm Tired" is a song by British singer Labrinth and American singer Zendaya, released on February 28, 2022 by Columbia Records as the sixth single from Euphoria Season 2 (An HBO Original Series Soundtrack). The track was written by both performers alongside American teen drama series Euphoria creator Sam Levinson. The record features prominently in "You Who Cannot See, Think of Those Who Can", the fourth episode of the second season. Three versions of the song were also included on Euphoria Season 2 Official Score (From the HBO Original Series). At the 74th Primetime Creative Arts Emmy Awards, the song was nominated for Outstanding Original Music and Lyrics.

== Background ==
British musician Labrinth composed the music for season 1 and 2 of American teen drama series Euphoria. Actress Zendaya plays protagonist Rue Bennett, but she is also a singer and had previously sung a version of Labrinth's song "All for Us" for Euphoria.

He wrote "I'm Tired" with series creator and writer-director Sam Levinson, and star Zendaya. On January 30, 2022, it was used in season 2's fourth episode "You Who Cannot See, Think of Those Who Can". In the scene Rue hallucinates being at her own funeral with her deceased father, who merges into a cameo appearance by Labrinth as the pastor presiding over the congregation singing "I'm Tired" live. Labrinth told Variety that "I think [Sam] just loved merging those two worlds and to be like, 'Here’s the music appearing in the physical form'. It [was] just kind of impulsive and Sam was like, 'Okay cool, I’m going to record you in two days. We’ve gotta get the song ready for that time.'"

On February 28, Columbia Records released the song as the sixth single from Euphoria Season 2 (An HBO Original Series Soundtrack), which Labrinth produced. On April 22, three versions of the song were included on Euphoria Season 2 Official Score (From the HBO Original Series), an extended solo Labrinth recording, and a Zendaya only track renamed "Rue's I'm Tired", alongside the original at the end of the soundtrack album.

== Composition ==
The "gospel-inspired" song's writing process was explained by Labrinth: "[Zendaya] was like, 'check out this scene, this is what we’re talking about.' Then I [sang], 'Hey lord, you know I’m tired.' And then she was like, 'Oh shit!' And we just started writing the song. It was all of that impulsive inspiration, you know? And then being in the scene, I was like, 'I haven’t performed for a while and I’ve not been on American TV before or been an actor before — oh shit, what do I do?' I [was] like, just be in the moment. And I know what Rue’s character is going through, so I was like, 'Zone in and let go of your own issues.'"

== Commercial performance ==
At both Coachella 2023, and 2026, Labrinth and Zendaya performed the song.

== Accolades ==
At the 74th Primetime Creative Arts Emmy Awards, Labrinth, Levinson, and Zendaya were nominated for the Primetime Emmy Award for Outstanding Original Music and Lyrics for their work on "I'm Tired" in "You Who Cannot See, Think of Those Who Can". Labrinth, Levinson and Zendaya were also nominated for the Black Reel TV Awards for Outstanding Original Song in 2022.

== Charts ==
Chart performance for "I'm Tired"
Chart (2022)	Peak position
Australia (ARIA)	21
Canada Hot 100 (Billboard)	35
France (SNEP)	165
Global 200 (Billboard)	29
Greece International (IFPI)	12
Hungary (Stream Top 40)	29
Iceland (Tónlistinn)	10
Ireland (IRMA)	21
Lithuania (AGATA)	12
Netherlands (Single Tip)	2
New Zealand (Recorded Music NZ)	16
Norway (VG-lista)	26
Portugal (AFP)	54
South Africa Streaming (TOSAC)	35
Sweden (Sverigetopplistan)	40
Switzerland (Schweizer Hitparade)	64
UK Singles (Official Charts)	47
US Billboard Hot 100	53
US Adult Pop Airplay (Billboard)	40
US Pop Airplay (Billboard)	34

== Certifications ==
Certifications for "I'm Tired"
Region	Certification	Certified units/sales
Canada (Music Canada)	Gold	40,000^{‡}
New Zealand (RMNZ)	Gold	15,000^{‡}
United States (RIAA)	Gold	500,000^{‡}
^{‡} Sales+streaming figures based on certification alone.

== Release history ==
Release dates and formats for "I'm Tired"
Region	Date	Format(s)	Label(s)	Ref.
Various	February 28, 2022	Digital download; streaming	Columbia	
United States	March 8, 2022	Contemporary hit radio	Columbia	
United States	March 21, 2022	Hot adult contemporary radio	Columbia	
