= You Who Cannot See, Think of Those Who Can =

- Euphoria episode
- Rue Bennett at her own funeral.
- Episode no.: Season 2 Episode 4
- Directed by: Sam Levinson
- Written by: Sam Levinson
- Cinematography by: Marcell Rév
- Editing by: Julio C. Perez IV
- Original air date: January 30, 2022
- Running time: 61 minutes

Guest appearances
- Minka Kelly as Samantha; Paula Marshall as Marsha Jacobs; Alanna Ubach as Suze Howard; Tyler Chase as Custer; Zak Steiner as Aaron Jacobs; Bruce Wexler as Robert Bennett; Henry Eikenberry as Derek

Episode chronology
← Previous "Ruminations: Big and Little Bullys"	Next → "Stand Still Like the Hummingbird"
- Euphoria season 2

"You Who Cannot See, Think of Those Who Can" is the fourth episode of the second season of the American teen drama television series Euphoria. The episode was written and directed by series creator Sam Levinson. It originally aired on HBO on January 30, 2022. The title of this episode is a reference to a 1924 Bureau of Surrealist Research leaflet by French writer André Breton.

In the episode, Jules Vaughn (Hunter Schafer) cheats on her girlfriend Rue Bennett (Zendaya) with Elliot (Dominic Fike), while Cassie Howard (Sydney Sweeney) embarrasses herself at Maddy Perez's (Alexa Demie) birthday party. Meanwhile, Cal Jacobs (Eric Dane) leaves his family.

"You Who Cannot See, Think of Those Who Can" received mostly positive reviews. Out of the sixteen Primetime Emmy Award nominations received by the show for its second season, one was specifically for this episode, Outstanding Original Music and Lyrics for "I'm Tired".

== Plot ==
After Rue Bennett (Zendaya) cannot feel her cunnilingus, Jules Vaughn (Hunter Schafer) confides in Elliot (Dominic Fike) and they kiss. Maddy Perez (Alexa Demie) and Nate Jacobs (Jacob Elordi) spend the night together and discuss their relationship. Cassie Howard (Sydney Sweeney) argues with Nate about his rekindled relationship with Maddy, and later confronts her sister Lexi (Maude Apatow) for being judgemental; Lexi recreates Cassie's rant in the script of her upcoming play as a monologue.

Nate prepares to leave for Maddy's birthday party and encounters his drunk father Cal (Eric Dane) downstairs. At Maddy's party, Kat Hernandez (Barbie Ferreira) admits to Maddy that she isn't in love with Ethan Daley (Austin Abrams); Maddy advises Kat to trust her own intuition. In the hot tub, Nate and Maddy are asked if they're still together; Nate's abrupt response angers Maddy, but their argument is interrupted when a heavily inebriated Cassie vomits in the water.

Rue, Jules, and Elliot spend time together in Elliot's bedroom. When Rue excuses herself to the restroom, Jules tells Elliot that she believes that Rue has a crush on him. Rue kisses Elliot as part of a dare and Jules dares Elliot to kiss her body. The trio then arrive at a liquor store, where Jules and Elliot steal several cases of hard seltzer; Jules is displeased at seeing Rue drink the alcohol as they drive, causing Rue to angrily lash out at her. Rue asks to be dropped off home, where she takes several drugs.

Meanwhile, Cal drives recklessly to the gay bar where he and childhood fling Derek shared their first kiss decades ago. Cal dances with another man, who he imagines as Derek. After trying to wrestle the man, Cal gets banned from the bar, and he reluctantly drives back home. In a stupor, Cal admits that he had been having sexual encounters with men. He berates his family for not allowing him to be open about his sexual orientation, telling Nate that he is his biggest regret in life, and abruptly decides to leave them.

In his bedroom, Elliot admits to Jules that Rue had been using opiates since New Year's Eve. Jules is devastated, but ultimately decides to have sex with him. Rue begins to hallucinate being at her own funeral with her deceased father. She expresses regret about her life to him, but he comforts her.

== Production ==
=== Writing ===
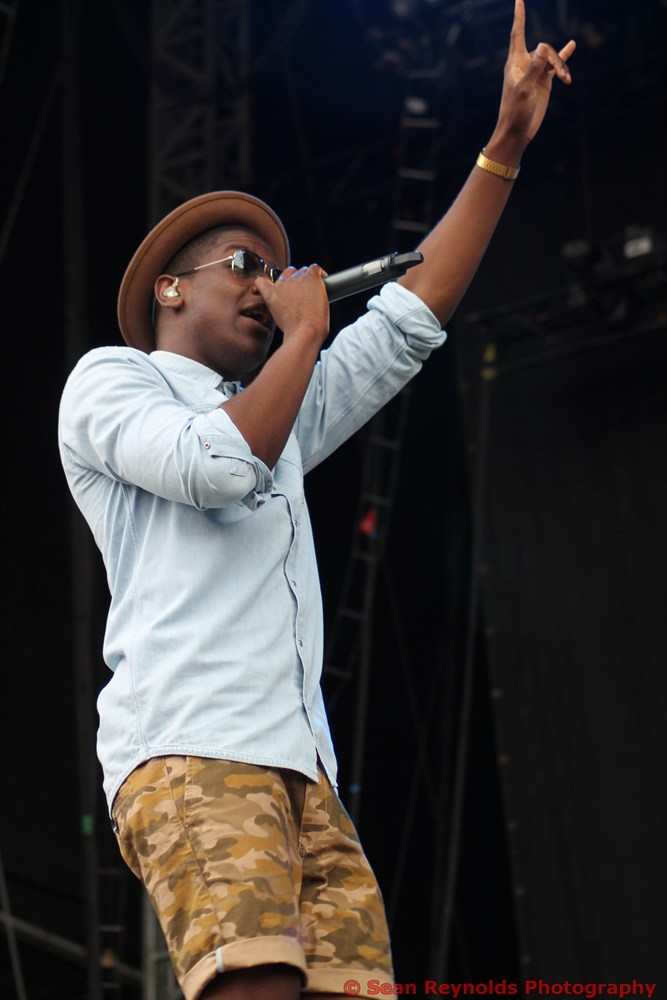
Labrinth makes a cameo appearance in "You Who Cannot See, Think of Those Who Can" singing his song "I'm Tired", which got him nominated for a Primetime Emmy Award.

A leaflet circulated by the Bureau of Surrealist Research in 1924 Paris, written by French founder of surrealism and poet André Breton which reads 'Vous qui ne pouvez pas, pensez à ceux qui voient.', translated into English is the origin of the episode's title. This name was chosen to parallel to the many hidden aspects of the character's lives, Rue's relapse from Jules, Cal's sex life from his family, Cassie's hook up with Nate from Maddy.

In the opening montage, Jules is shown as Rue sees her: Venus in Sandro Botticelli's painting The Birth of Venus. They are also depicted as famous couples, Jules as John Lennon and Rue as Yoko Ono in a recreation of their 1981 Rolling Stone cover, as the The Lovers in René Magritte's painting, Jules as Frida Kahlo in Self Portrait as a Tehuana, with Rue on her forehead as Diego Rivera, Jules as Demi Moore and Rue as Patrick Swayze in the film Ghost (1990); remaking the sensual pottery wheel scene, Jules as Kate Winslet and Rue as Leonardo DiCaprio in the film Titanic (1997); portraying the scene on the ship's railings, Jules as Snow White and Rue as the Prince in Snow White and the Seven Dwarfs (1937); an animated segment where Rue gives Jules the true love's kiss and finally Jules as Ennis Del Mar and Rue as Jack Twist in their campfire sex scene in Brokeback Mountain (2005).

=== Filming ===
Location shooting for the liquor store Rue, Jules, and Elliot rob took place at Favorite Liquor in Burbank, California. When Rue hallucinates her own funeral in the episode, it was shot at Knox Presbyterian Church in Ladera Heights, California. Euphoria composer Labrinth makes an cameo appearance in the episode as the pastor presiding over the congregation. He wore a burgundy suit, the same color as Rue's comfort hoodie from her father.

=== Music ===
Alongside Zendaya, Labrinth performs their song "I'm Tired" in his scene. "I'll Be Here in the Morning" by Townes Van Zandt plays over the Rue/Jules cold open. Cal dancing at a gay bar intercuts with Cassie spiraling to "Drink Before the War" by Sinéad O'Connor. Yeat's song "U Could Tëll" also appears in the episode. Three songs written for season 2's soundtrack appear in the episode, "How Long" by Swedish singer-songwriter Tove Lo, "Sad4whattt" by Ericdoa and "(Pick Me Up) Euphoria" by James Blake and Labrinth plays over the closing credits. Lo told Rolling Stone: "I'm so honored that it gets to be a part of Euphoria, a show I love so much because of its rawness and provocative storytelling." Ericdoa explained that "We sent through five or six demos [to the Euphoria team] and they sifted through the pack and picked the one that I was literally not going to release." Eric added that he thought the song "worked well in Euphoria "because it's super high energy [...] It's super upbeat, then it takes you right back down, then up again [...] and that's what that entire season was".

== Reception ==
=== Ratings ===
According to Nielsen Media Research, upon airing "You Who Cannot See, Think of Those Who Can" was watched by 318,000 people. They estimated that 0.13% of the total 18-49 population in the US was tuning in. Including stats from streaming service HBO Max and three linear reruns on HBO, the episode drew 3,200,000 viewers. Viewership on the first day of release was up 166 percent from season 1's fourth episode "Shook Ones Pt. II". According to Google Trends, searches for "Cal Jacobs family photo" increased by +550 percent in the United States in the four days after the episode's broadcast.

=== Critical reviews ===
Review aggregator website Rotten Tomatoes gives the episode an approval score of 83%, based on 6 critical reviews. In a ranking of the first two seasons and specials, BuzzFeed listed "You Who Cannot See, Think of Those Who Can" at twelve out of eighteen, they praised two sequences in the episode: "First, the Cassie hot tub sequence which is magnificently disgusting and instantly iconic. And then, the Cal-pissing-in-the-foyer-while-telling-his-family-they-are-terrible grand finale." IndieWire placed it at fourteenth in a list which included season three's premiere "Ándale", writing that it "improves upon the largely aimless first half of Euphoria season 2 by tightly constricting the action to one wild night and thematically linking its three storylines."

Variety called "You Who Cannot See, Think of Those Who Can" a "showcase" for Dane and "the show at its astounding best." The A.V. Club wrote that the "relationship drama remains one-dimensional, but at least the chaos has an orderly through-line this week." Iana Murray for Vulture was mixed on the episode, writing: "Now that we’re halfway through this season, I’ve been thinking a lot about why I keep coming back to Euphoria. Despite feeling underwhelmed every week, I still look forward to what’s coming next. And sure, my anticipation is filled with a healthy dose of trepidation, but I’m still excited nonetheless. But why? [...] The reason is Zendaya. Nothing has capitalized on her star power quite like Euphoria, and even when the show’s worst tendencies threaten to eclipse her, she still confidently carries every episode." She also criticised the episode's pacing, "[the episode] presents itself as a turning point of sorts, but in reality, progression has been incremental. [...] It’s why the montage toward the end comes across as a desperate grasp for profundity with its expressive lighting and contemplative fourth wall breaks. The result is disappointingly anticlimatic. It’s been a season of all setup and little payoff so far. We can only hope that Euphoria will fulfill its promises."

=== Accolades ===
The episode was "I'm Tired"'s submission at the 74th Primetime Creative Arts Emmy Awards, leading Labrinth for his music and Sam Levinson and Zendaya for their lyrics to a nomination for the Primetime Emmy Award for Outstanding Original Music and Lyrics. Labrinth, Levinson and Zendaya were also nominated for the Black Reel TV Awards for Outstanding Original Song in 2022.

At the 2022 MTV Movie & TV Awards the kiss between Schafer and Fike was nominated for a MTV Movie Award for Best Kiss. Jason Baldwin-Stewart's production design in this episode and the final two of the season was honored at the Art Directors Guild Awards 2022 with a nomination for Excellence in Production Design for a One-Hour Contemporary Single-Camera Series.
