= Adam Leber =

American talent manager, entrepreneur, and investor

- Born: 1977 (age 48–49); Queens, New York, United States
- Occupations: Talent manager; entrepreneur; investor
- Musical career
- Genres: Pop; R&B; hip hop

Adam Leber is an American talent manager, entrepreneur, and investor. The CEO of management company Rebel, and formerly a founding partner at Maverick Management, Leber currently manages Lil Nas X, Labrinth, and LSD among others, and formerly managed artists including Miley Cyrus, Avril Lavigne, and Britney Spears.

In 2017, Leber made his first appearance on Billboard's Power 100 list, the publication's annual ranking of executives driving the music industry, at #65. He has also been included on Billboard's R&B/Hip-Hop Power Players lists in 2019, 2020, and 2021.

Leber is Jewish and was born and raised in Queens, New York, and currently resides in Los Angeles with his wife Sarah Boyer and daughter Micki Mae.

== Career ==
=== Early career ===
Leber's music industry career began with an internship at Loud Records, working with their street teams. The internship at the record label led to a role in the label's marketing department, where he worked with quintessential New York hip-hop artists such as Mobb Deep, Big Pun, and the Wu-Tang Clan.

Leber joined the pop world in 2001, managing tour sponsorships, arranging endorsement deals and road managing for a roster of stars that included *NSYNC, Dixie Chicks, Sean "Diddy" Combs, and Britney Spears.

=== Artist management ===
In 2005, Leber partnered with Larry Rudolph and founded ReignDeer Entertainment, a full-service entertainment company involved in artist management, television and film production. Together they signed Miley Cyrus, and managed Britney Spears, Aerosmith, Will.i.am, Avril Lavigne, Fifth Harmony and more.

As one of Spears' managers, Leber helped launch her Las Vegas residency Britney: Piece of Me at Planet Hollywood in 2013, which grossed over $137 million in its 248 show run.

In 2014 Leber teamed up with Guy Oseary as well as 8 other established music managers and founded Maverick Management, which represents artists from a wide range of music genres including pop, hip-hop, rock, and country.

Leber added hip hop artist Lil Nas X to his roster in May 2019, co-managing alongside Maverick's Gee Roberson. Nas X's single "Old Town Road" went on to break the record for longest tenure at #1 on the Billboard Hot 100 in July and earn two wins at the 62nd Annual Grammy Awards.

On April 5, 2021, Leber announced that he was leaving Maverick to launch a management and media company Rebel (his last name in reverse) in conjunction with Live Nation. At his new Los Angeles based company, Leber continues to manage Lil Nas X, Labrinth and LSD among others.

In August 2021, Leber and Cyrus parted ways after almost a decade. The following month, Leber signed the Kid Laroi to his Rebel roster.

=== Television ===
Leber began serving as a music supervisor on HBO's Euphoria in 2019. His work on the show earned him an Emmy nomination alongside Jen Malone for Outstanding Music Supervision, and a win at the Guild of Music Supervisors Awards for Best Music Supervision in a Television Drama. His client Labrinth was also chosen to score the show after Leber played some of his music for the creator Sam Levinson, and in turn earned two Emmy nominations in 2020 for Outstanding Music Composition for a Series and Outstanding Original Music and Lyrics for his song "All for Us".

=== Technology & investments ===
Leber was an early investor in Uber, and has since expanded his investments to Everlane, Stance, Acorns, Airbnb, Hyperloop, and Reface. Leber also has a stake in Shervin Pishevar's Sherpa Ventures.

== Awards and nominations ==
=== Primetime Emmy Awards ===
Year	Nominated work	Category	Result	Ref.
2020	Euphoria (Episode: "And Salt the Earth Behind You")	Outstanding Music Supervision	Nominated	
2022	Euphoria (Episode: "Trying to Get to Heaven Before They Close the Door")	Outstanding Music Supervision	Nominated	

=== Guild of Music Supervisors Awards ===
Year	Nominated work	Category	Result	Ref.
2020	Euphoria (for Season 1)	Best Music Supervision in a Television Dram	Won	
