= Rue Bennett =

Fictional character from Euphoria

- Euphoria character
- Zendaya as Rue Bennett
- First appearance: "Pilot"; Euphoria; June 16, 2019
- Last appearance: "In God We Trust"; May 31, 2026
- Created by: Sam Levinson
- Portrayed by: Zendaya; Janice LeAnn Brown (age four); McKenna Rae Roberts (age ten); Aliyah Conley (age thirteen); Alumière Glass (age three)

In-universe information
- Full name: Ruby Bennett
- Nicknames: Rue Rue; Kid (by Fezco O'Neill)
- Occupation: Student; Cashier; Drug mule; Uber driver; Procurer; Drug dealer; Informant
- Affiliation: Laurie's drug trade; Alamo Brown's Silver Slipper
- Family: Robert Bennett (father); Leslie Bennett (mother); Gia Bennett (younger sister)
- Significant others: Jules Vaughn (on-and-off girlfriend); Angel (hook up)
- Nationality: American
- Date of birth: September 14, 2001
- Date of death: October 13, 2024 (age 23)
- Cause of death: Fentanyl overdose

Ruby "Rue" Bennett is a fictional character in the American television drama series Euphoria on HBO. Part of the main cast for all three seasons and the specials, Rue is the sardonic protagonist who serves as the show's unreliable narrator through voice-over monologues about other characters' intimate lives.

Rue is portrayed by Zendaya and depicted as a junior in high school with substance use disorder. Having failed drug rehabilitation, Rue meets Jules Vaughn (Hunter Schafer) and falls instantly in love with her. Triggered by her complicated romance with Jules, Rue relapses into opiate addiction, discouraged by her mentor Ali Muhammad (Colman Domingo) and encouraged by addict friend Elliot (Dominic Fike). After indebting herself to her drug dealer Fezco O'Neill's (Angus Cloud) and supplier Laurie (Martha Kelly), Rue decides to stay clean and breakup with Jules. As a young adult, Laurie indentures Rue as a drug mule, before she escapes to work for pimp Alamo Brown (Adewale Akinnuoye-Agbaje), who eventually kills her.

Sam Levinson wrote Rue based on his experiences with drugs as a teenager; she has been described as a self-insert. The character and Zendaya's performance have received universal critical acclaim. For her portrayal, Zendaya has won two Primetime Emmy Awards for Outstanding Lead Actress in a Drama Series, a Golden Globe Award for Best Actress – Television Series Drama, a Critics' Choice Television Award for Best Actress in a Drama Series, and a Satellite Award for Best Actress – Television Series Drama.

== Development ==
=== Casting ===
The role of Rue was initially going to be given to an unknown actress. Casting director Jennifer Venditti said to Variety that while former Disney Channel star Zendaya was always the first choice, "There was a young woman who had been street scouted by my team who was a magical person and had a similar trajectory as Rue and had come around to the other side." Despite being given an acting coach, Euphoria creator and showrunner Sam Levinson wasn’t convinced she was ready for the emotional weight of reliving her lowest life moments. Venditti added, "It’s so interesting. A polar opposite. Because here’s Zendaya, who has none of the life experiences of Rue, who was able to dig into her toolbox and access it in such a beautiful way." In an interview with GQ, Myha'la revealed that she auditioned for Rue.

=== Writing ===
Levinson started work on creating Rue when he was 21, basing her on his teenage struggles with anxiety, depression, and addiction. Several commentators have called the character Levinson's self-insert. Rue is the protagonist and unreliable narrator. Her voice-over is attributed to the effects of drugs on her brain; events Rue described are frequently not true. The special episodes "Trouble Don't Last Always" and "Fuck Anyone Who's Not a Sea Blob" lack narration, therefore have a more objective view. Costume designer for the HBO show, Heidi Bivens stated that Rue "feels non-binary to me too, in alot of ways, which is something that’s being explored on the show."

== Background ==
Rue was born three days after the September 11 attacks. Early in her childhood, she was diagnosed with obsessive–compulsive disorder, attention deficit hyperactivity disorder, generalized anxiety disorder, and bipolar disorder. During a panic attack–induced hospital visit, eleven-year-old Rue was given diazepam. She described the feeling as the one "she had been searching for her entire life".

After her father Robert Bennett was diagnosed with cancer, thirteen-year-old Rue took care of him often due to her mother Leslie Bennett (Nika King) working more to support the household. Rue started stealing Robert's medical oxycodone and using it recreationally. When he died, she developed substance use disorder as a coping mechanism. As a sophomore, Rue overdosed and nearly died before being saved by her younger sister, Gia Bennett (Storm Reid). After physically recovering, Rue was sent to rehab.

== Appearances ==
=== Season 1 (2019) ===
Before junior year starts, Rue goes to buy opiates from her dealer and friend Fezco O'Neill (Angus Cloud). Fezco's brother Ashtray (Javon Walton) sells Rue 5-MeO-DiPT. Rue cheats a drug test her mother forces her to take by using urine procured from Rue's childhood friend Lexi Howard (Maude Apatow). Secretly going to Chris McKay's (Algee Smith) party, Rue discusses her addiction with Fezco. The spectacle of Jules Vaughn (Hunter Schafer) and Nate Jacobs' (Jacob Elordi) fight grabs Rue’s attention. At Jules’ home, Rue cleans her wounds and suggests getting high.

Rue and Jules hold hands at East Highland High School. Earlier, they take Ashtray's psychedelics. Rue breaks down in front of the class after being asked to talk about her summer. Lexi attempts to comfort Rue, but she chastises her for believing they are best friends. Later, Rue refuses to leave Fezco's home despite his plans to meet his supplier, who pressures Rue into taking fentanyl. Rue blacks out and wakes up in Jules' bed, where Fezco took her.

Rue is skeptical of Jules' relationship with "Tyler" (Nate's online persona), but still helps her take nudes for him. Rue steals medication from Jules' home before going to a Narcotics Anonymous meeting high and pretending to have been sober for longer than she really has. Muslim recovering addict Ali Muhammad (Colman Domingo) knows she is lying, however, and warns her that she is on a dangerous path. After a heart to heart, Rue unexpectedly kisses Jules, before running away in shock. Rue heads to Fezco's apartment for drugs, but he refuses to give her any. After blaming him for her addiction, Rue calls Ali.

Ali compares Rue's obsession with Jules to her addiction. At a traveling carnival, Rue sighs with relief when she is assured by Jules that their kiss was normal. Jules then tells Rue that she had casual sex with Nate's father Cal (Eric Dane), who is married and closeted. Rue receives a phone call from Leslie, who tells her Gia isn't answering her phone. Rue finds her sister smoking cannabis. Once Gia and Rue are home, Jules arrives, informs Rue that "Tyler" was actually Nate, who threatened to send her nude selfies to the police and have her arrested for distributing child pornography if she told anyone about sleeping with his father, and the girls kiss passionately.

Rue becomes obsessed with Jules, in part as a replacement addiction. Interrupted while masturbating to fantasies of Jules, Rue tells her mother they are dating. Jules asks Rue to stay quiet about her encounter with Cal. Rue asks Jules if Nate knows and warns of the danger of her situation. After a good talk with Ali, Rue admits the truth to everyone in her rehab group. She also makes amends with Lexi and invites her roller skating, along with Jules.

Attending a Halloween party dressed as Marlene Dietrich in Morocco (1930), Rue feels left out as the only sober one, sensing that something is off with an intoxicated Jules. Rue rescues Jules when she drunkenly stumbles into the swimming pool. Once Nate arrives at the party, Rue becomes anxious and suspicious of how well he and Jules know each other.

Rue gets depressed and lays in bed all day watching Love Island, unmotivated even to go to the bathroom. At Fezco's home, Rue resists hallucinations of pill bottles begging her to take them. Rue is found by Leslie, lying on the floor with a urinary tract infection. Leslie helps her up and bathes her. Jules texts Rue, telling her that she misses her.

Rue and Jules reconcile in the hospital. At their school's winter formal, Nate tells Rue she doesn't know everything about Jules. This inevitably prompts Rue and Jules to talk. Jules admits she loves Rue before they decide to leave East Highland together. At the train station, however, Rue has second thoughts and backs out at the last minute. She says her goodbyes and watches as Jules leaves alone on the train. A heartbroken Rue returns home and relapses, experiencing a vivid, hallucination of an "All for Us" dance number.

=== Specials (2020–2021) ===
On Christmas Eve, an intoxicated Rue meets with Ali at a diner and blames Jules for her relapse. Ali reminds her that addiction is a disease and notes that Rue never officially acknowledged Jules as her girlfriend. Rue is suicidal and feels guilty about her treatment of Leslie. Ali argues that drugs fundamentally change a person; he reveals that his birth name is Martin and he grew up with an abusive father, only to become violent with his wife as an adult. Ali tells Rue that a refusal to forgive oneself for one's mistakes is what prevents personal growth.

=== Season 2 (2022) ===
On New Year's Eve, Rue accompanies Fezco and Ashtray to a harrowing drug trade with associates of teacher turned drug lord Laurie (Martha Kelly). When the trio attend a subsequent house party, Rue hides from Jules. Rue takes a spate of drugs with a student named Elliot (Dominic Fike) and nearly overdoses, but Elliot saves her with emergency Adderall from her sock. She reunites with Jules and admits to relapsing the night Jules left her. Midnight strikes, the two confess their feelings for one another and kiss.

Rue pretends to forget how she met Elliot and introduces him to Jules as her girlfriend. Rue skips dinner with Jules to get high with Elliot. When Rue tells Elliot about her father, he asks if Robert's passing is the reason why she started doing drugs, which she denies. Rue bikes to her NA meeting and briefly sees Lexi's sister Cassie (Sydney Sweeney) getting into Nate's truck. Ali gives Rue a ride home and insists that he introduces himself to Leslie, who asks Ali how Rue is doing. Ali, who can tell that Rue has relapsed, simply says that she has a long way to go.

Rue develops a plan to hide her drug use from Jules and Gia. Rue reveals to Jules that she actually does know Elliot, making Jules suspicious that he only wants to have sex with Rue. When she runs out of drugs, she convinces Laurie to give her a large stash, ostensibly for Rue to sell, but really just for her own use. Ali becomes suspicious of Rue, causing a heated argument that leads them to cut ties.

Rue poorly fakes an orgasm when Jules performs cunnilingus she is too high to feel. Elliot, Jules and Rue play truth or dare?. The trio arrive at a liquor store and steal several cases of hard seltzer. Jules confronts Rue about breaking her sobriety, resulting in an argument in which Rue tells Jules that she can't stand her and asks to be dropped home. Once there, she takes pills and begins to hallucinate being at her own funeral, where the song "I'm Tired" is performed.

Back at home, Gia overhears an argument between Leslie, who has recently discovered that Rue has relapsed to hard drugs again. She begins to panic, as she can't find the suitcase that Laurie fronted her. After Rue has a violent meltdown, Leslie reveals that Jules was the one who told her. Rue becomes incensed at hearing Jules' voice, finding her and Elliot in the living room. Rue, realizing the affair between Jules and Elliot, harshly berates Jules and ends their relationship. Rue allows Leslie to drive her to the hospital, but upon realizing she intends to send her back to drug rehabilitation, gets out in the middle of the road and runs away.

She runs to Lexi's house; her mother and friends are there for the intervention. Rue reveals Cassie and Nate's relationship, causing chaos and allowing her to escape. Rue burgles a house to start paying back Laurie. Reeling from withdrawal, Rue narrowly outruns and hides from the police, and reaches Laurie, who gives her morphine. Laurie implies she will force Rue to prostitute herself to pay her debts. Rue sneaks out in the morning and returns home.

Rue makes progress in recovering from withdrawal, reconciling with Ali in the process. Leslie learns no inpatient facility has room for Rue and breaks down, fearing Rue will kill herself without treatment. Leslie tells Rue she is done dealing with her drug addiction and plans to focus on Gia. Elliot plays Rue "Elliot's Song". Jules tells Rue that she loves and misses her, to which Rue responds by kissing her on the head before leaving in silence; Jules cries alone. Rue narrates that she stayed clean for the rest of the school year and is cautiously optimistic about the future.

=== Season 3 (2026) ===
Five years later, Laurie finds Rue and forces her to work as a mule across the Mexico–United States border to pay off her debt. Reflecting upon her encounter with a devoutly Christian family, and with some prodding from Ali, she reconsiders the twelve-step program. Rue delivers drugs to strip club mogul Alamo Brown (Adewale Akinnuoye-Agbaje). Alamo learns to trust Rue when he shoots an apple off of her head. Rue and Jules experience sexual tension when Rue visits Jules' sugar daddy's penthouse apartment.

Rue starts trafficking 3D-printed firearms for Alamo. Rue and Alamo's henchman Bishop (Darrell Britt-Gibson) pick up drugs from Laurie. After being arrested with drugs, Rue becomes an informant for a Drug Enforcement Administration investigation into Laurie. When Rue offers to set up a fake buy in Mexico, Alamo becomes suspicious of her motives. Stripper Magick (Rosalía) overhears and nearly blows Rue's cover, but Laurie's squad raids the club, shoots manager Big Eddy (Kadeem Hardison) and robs the safe.

Alamo tells Rue that Laurie wants to meet. Rue informs DEA agents, who make her call Laurie to arrange a wiretap. Laurie hangs up, but Rue gets Wayne (Toby Wallace) to incriminate himself instead. At the club, Magick accuses Rue of framing her to Alamo. He later finds Rue with Maddy Perez (Alexa Demie) at a diner and orders Rue to go to a waiting truck. Rue is taken to a remote area, buried up to her neck, and at dawn Alamo rides toward her with a polo mallet, ready to strike her head.

Rue betrays Faye Valentine (Chloe Cherry) to save herself from Alamo's death threat, convincing Faye to help rob Laurie despite Faye's relationship with Wayne. The DEA secretly listens through Rue's phone to a smuggling deal being made between Alamo and Laurie. Rue expresses interest in a serious relationship to Jules, but Jules rejects the idea as a fantasy and slaps her. Later, Rue survives a car crash that sets a tree on fire, which she interprets as a burning bush and divine providence.

Lexi is annoyed by Rue's incessant belief that she has found God after her car crash and tells her she deserves to have been cut off from her family. Ali attempts to dissuade Rue from returning to Laurie's, but is unsuccessful. She attempts to steal the money from Laurie's safe for Alamo with Faye's help, but Faye has a change of heart and outs her to Wayne.

Rue escapes by hitting Wayne on the leg and running away. Wayne's father Harley (James Landry Hébert) catches her with a lasso, but G (Marshawn Lynch) snipes him and they get away. Alamo is kind to Rue, getting her cut hand stitched up, giving her money and percocets for the pain. Rue stays at Ali's house. While listening to an audiobook of the Bible on the couch, Rue wakes up on October 13, 2024, to hear Fezco has escaped prison on the news. She dashes to save him, imagining visions of both him and Jules in the process. She returns to her childhood home and finds Leslie reading the Bible. This turns out to be a hallucination; on the actual October 13, Ali wakes up to find Rue dead on the couch from an overdose, Alamo having laced her pain medication with fentanyl. Rue later appears as a vision to Ali during a meal and smiles as she says "Amen", finally at peace.

== Reception ==
=== Critical response ===
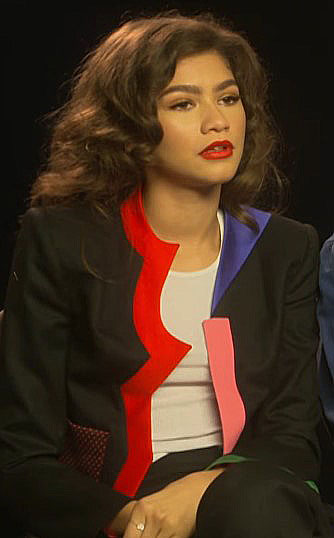
Critics praised Zendaya's (pictured 2017) performance as Rue in Euphoria.

In response to anti-drug program Drug Abuse Resistance Education's condemnation of Rue's actions, Zendaya said that "It’s really important that there’s light at the end of the tunnel for her, because I think she has a lot of beauty inside of her. […] I’ve had a lot of people reach out and find […] So many parallels with Rue and her story and Rue means a lot to them in a way that I can understand, but also maybe in a way that I could never understand". Speaking for Medium, Tanya Malik branded Rue the "Anti-Hero Gen Z Deserves". The Guardian's Rebecca Nicholson called Zendaya "astonishing as the self-destructive Rue". IGN called Rue the "anchor of this showcase of tumultuous youth".

=== Accolades ===
Zendaya's performance in the role has received universal acclaim from awards bodies, having won her a Primetime Emmy Award for Outstanding Lead Actress in a Drama Series twice, once for the episode "Made You Look" and again for the episode "Stand Still Like the Hummingbird"; she is the youngest Best Actress Drama Primetime Emmy Award winner in history. She is also the youngest person to win two Emmy Awards. Zendaya gained a third Emmy nomination in 2026 for playing Rue.

Another accolade given to the acting of Rue is the Black Reel Award for Outstanding Actress, Drama Series, once again twice for the first two seasons. For season 1, Zendaya as Rue won the Satellite Award for Best Actress – Television Series Drama. For season 2, She won the Golden Globe Award for Best Actress – Television Series Drama, Critics' Choice Television Award for Best Actress in a Drama Series, MTV Movie & TV Award for Best Performance in a Show and was nominated for the Actor Award for Outstanding Performance by a Female Actor in a Drama Series.

== See also ==
- List of fictional lesbian characters
- List of lesbian characters in television
- Media portrayal of lesbians
