= Sam Levinson =

American writer, director and producer (born 1985)

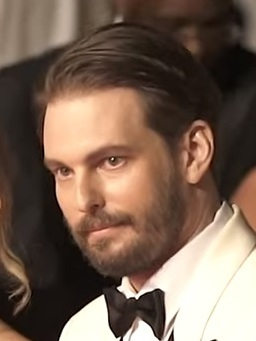
- Levinson at the 2023 Cannes Film Festival
- Born: Samuel Abraham Levinson; January 8, 1985 (age 41)
- Occupations: Screenwriter; director; producer; showrunner
- Years active: 1992–present
- Spouse: Ashley Lent
- Partner: Ellen Barkin (2008–2011)
- Father: Barry Levinson

Samuel Abraham Levinson (born January 8, 1985) is an American screenwriter, director, producer, and showrunner. He created the HBO teen drama series Euphoria which was adapted from the Israeli series of the same name.

The son of director Barry Levinson, Sam Levinson received his first writing credit for the action comedy film Operation: Endgame in 2010. The following year, he made his directorial film debut with Another Happy Day (2011), which premiered at Sundance Film Festival. He then received a writing credit on his father's HBO television film The Wizard of Lies (2017). He continued writing and directing for the feature films Assassination Nation (2018) and Malcolm & Marie (2021). In 2023, he created the HBO series The Idol, which was controversial and received negative reviews.

== Early life ==
Levinson was born on January 8, 1985, and is the son of Diana Rhodes, a production designer for TV commercials, and filmmaker Barry Levinson. His father is from a Russian-Jewish family. Levinson studied method acting for four years.

== Career ==
Levinson made his film debut as an actor in his father's 1992 fantasy comedy Toys, alongside his brother Jack. He continued to appear in his father's films, such as the comedy-drama film Bandits (2001) and the satirical comedy film What Just Happened (2008). In 2009, he acted in the Uwe Boll film Stoic. In 2011, Levinson made his directorial film debut, Another Happy Day, at the Sundance Film Festival. Despite the film's negative reviews, it received the Waldo Salt Screenwriting Award.

Levinson co-wrote the 2017 television film The Wizard of Lies, which was directed by his father. The film focuses on Bernie Madoff, who is played by Robert De Niro. Levinson wrote and directed the film Assassination Nation, which premiered at the 2018 Sundance Film Festival to mixed reviews from critics, who praised its "frenetic and visually stylish" action but criticized the thinly written characters. In June 2019, Levinson created the HBO television drama series Euphoria, based on the Israeli series of the same name. The series has received both praise and criticism for its direction, writing, and acting. It is infamous for its raw and graphic portrayal of teenagers wrestling with drug addiction and sexuality. The series concluded with its third season in May 2026.

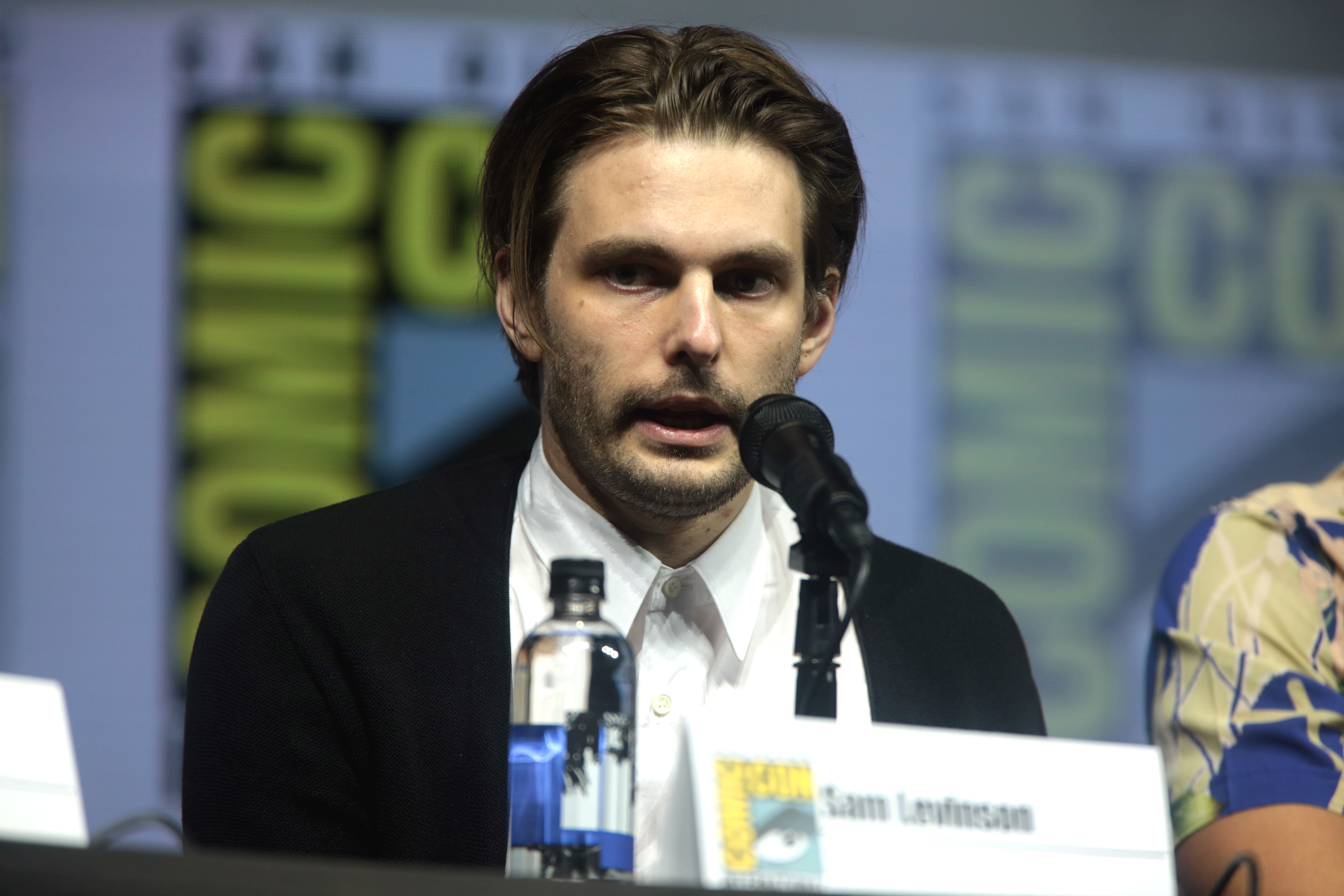
Levinson at the 2018 San Diego Comic-Con

In 2020, Levinson wrote and directed the film Malcolm & Marie, which was distributed by Netflix in February 2021. It was poorly received by critics. Aisha Harris of NPR wrote, "All that's left are two characters rendered awkwardly as vessels for a director's odd hang-ups about his own identity and craft". Shirley Lee of The Atlantic wrote, "Malcolm & Marie isn't Art. It's a meltdown" and that it "seems to use the titular couple as mouthpieces for a litany of his own gripes". Levinson co-wrote the screenplay for the psychological erotic thriller Deep Water (2022), based on Patricia Highsmith's 1957 novel of the same name. The film debuted on Hulu and was poorly received. The Guardian film critic Peter Bradshaw specifically panned the film's script, writing, "Deep Water looks like a huge amount of material has been shaped in the edit but there are odd gaps and elisions". Levinson has executive produced Pieces of a Woman (2020), Breaking (2022), X (2022), Pearl (2022), and MaXXXine (2024).

On June 29, 2021, Levinson announced that he was co-creating, writing, and executive producing another HBO television drama series, The Idol, alongside recording artist Abel "The Weeknd" Tesfaye and his producing partner Reza Fahim. The series garnered controversy following an exposé in Rolling Stone that featured allegations against Levinson and Tesfaye of creating a toxic work environment and crew members alleging the script involved explicit sexual content that amounted to "sexual torture porn". The first episode premiered at the 2023 Cannes Film Festival to negative reviews. Time Magazine critic Stephanie Zacharek wrote, "The Idol pretends to expose exploitation while reveling in it". Variety critic Peter Debruge wrote, "The script seems calculated to fool audiences into thinking they're observing how Hollywood operates, when so much of it amounts to tawdry clichés", and that the series "plays like a sordid male fantasy". The Idol premiered on Max on June 4, 2023. Noting that the season had been cut short by an episode without explanation, The Telegraph critic Ed Power wrote that the finale "had deepened the suspicion that, as far back as teen drama Euphoria, [Levinson] was a voyeur without a soul." HBO announced the show's cancellation after one season on August 28, 2023.

== Personal life ==
From 2008 to 2011, Levinson dated actress Ellen Barkin, who is 31 years his senior. Levinson is married to Ashley Lent Levinson, with whom he has a son.

Levinson has discussed his struggles with drugs as a teenager and young adult.

== Filmography ==
=== Film ===
Year	Title				
Year	Title	Director	Writer	Producer	Notes
2010	Operation: Endgame	No	Yes	No	
2011	Another Happy Day	Yes	Yes	No	
2018	Assassination Nation	Yes	Yes	No	
2021	Malcolm & Marie	Yes	Yes	Yes	
2022	Deep Water	No	Yes	No	
2024	Borderlands	No	Uncredited	No	Additional literary material

Executive producer

- Pieces of a Woman (2020)
- Breaking (2022)
- X (2022)
- Pearl (2022)
- MaXXXine (2024)
- Place to Be (2026)

==== Acting roles ====
Year	Title	Role
1992	Toys	War Room Player
2001	Bandits	Billy Saunders
2008	What Just Happened	Carl
2009	Stoic	Peter Thompson

=== Television ===
Year	Title					
Year	Title	Director	Writer	Executive Producer	Creator	Notes
2017	The Wizard of Lies	No	Yes	No	No	TV movie
2019–2026	Euphoria	Yes	Yes	Yes	Yes	3 seasons
2022	Irma Vep	No	No	Yes	No	Miniseries
2023	The Idol	Yes	Yes	Yes	Yes	5 episodes

== Critical reception ==
Year	Title	Rotten Tomatoes	Metacritic
Film
2010	Operation: Endgame	40%	
2011	Another Happy Day	46%	46/100
2018	Assassination Nation	74%	54/100
2021	Malcolm & Marie	57%	53/100
2022	Deep Water	35%	53/100
Television
2019	Euphoria season 1	80%	68/100
2022	Euphoria season 2	78%	74/100
2023	The Idol	18%	27/100
2026	Euphoria season 3	42%	56/100

== Accolades ==
Year	Award	Category	Work	Result	Ref.
2011	Sundance Film Festival	Waldo Salt Screenwriting Award	Another Happy Day	Won	
2011	Sundance Film Festival	Grand Jury Prize Dramatic	Another Happy Day	Nominated	
2011	Deauville American Film Festival	Grand Special Prize	Another Happy Day	Nominated	
2018	Writers Guild of America Awards	Television: Long Form – Adapted	The Wizard of Lies	Nominated	
2021	Writers Guild of America Awards	Television: Episodic Drama	Euphoria (for "Trouble Don't Last Always")	Nominated	
2018	Toronto International Film Festival	People's Choice Award: Midnight Madness	Assassination Nation	Nominated	
2018	Sitges Film Festival	Grand Audience Award for Best Motion Picture (Official Fantastic Selection)	Assassination Nation	Nominated	
2020	British Academy Television Awards	Best International Programme	Euphoria (for season 1)	Nominated	
2022	Black Reel TV Awards	Outstanding Drama Series	Euphoria (for season 2)	Nominated	
2022	Black Reel TV Awards	Outstanding Original Song	Euphoria (for "I'm Tired")	Won	
2022	Hollywood Critics Association Television Awards	Best Directing in a Broadcast Network or Cable Series, Drama	Euphoria (for "Stand Still Like the Hummingbird")	Nominated	
2022	Hollywood Critics Association Television Awards	Best Writing in a Broadcast Network or Cable Series, Drama	Euphoria (for "Stand Still Like the Hummingbird")	Nominated	
2022	Primetime Emmy Awards	Outstanding Drama Series	Euphoria (for season 2)	Nominated	
2022	Creative Arts Emmy Awards	Outstanding Original Music and Lyrics	Euphoria (for "I'm Tired")	Nominated	
2023	Directors Guild of America Awards	Outstanding Directorial Achievement in Dramatic Series	Euphoria (for "Stand Still Like the Hummingbird")	Won	
2023	Cannes Film Festival	Queer Palm	The Idol	Nominated	
