= Stand Still and See =

- Euphoria episode
- Rue Bennett prays to a burning bush.
- Episode no.: Season 3 Episode 6
- Directed by: Sam Levinson
- Written by: Sam Levinson
- Editing by: Nikola Boyanov; Aaron I. Butler; Aleshka Ferrero; Julio C. Perez IV
- Original air date: May 17, 2026
- Running time: 60 minutes

Guest appearances
- Sharon Stone as Patricia Lance; Colleen Camp as LA Nights Director; Rosalía as Magick; Marshawn Lynch as G; Darrell Britt-Gibson as Bishop; Danielle Deadwyler as Mama Brown; James Landry Hébert as Harley; Gideon Adlon as Gillie; Hemky Madera as Jimenez; Nika King as Leslie Bennett; Kwame Patterson as Preston; Anna Van Patten as Kitty; Homer Gere as Dylan Reid; Asante Blackk as Kidd; Jack Topalian as Naz; Matt Willig as Artur; Madison Thompson as Oceana

Episode chronology
← Previous "This Little Piggy"	Next → "Rain or Shine"
- Euphoria season 3

"Stand Still and See" is the sixth episode of the third season of the American psychological drama television series Euphoria. The episode was written and directed by series creator Sam Levinson. It originally aired on HBO on May 17, 2026 and received mixed to positive reviews. The title of this episode is a reference to the Book of Exodus 14:13.

The episode's cold open introduces young Alamo Brown (Adewale Akinnuoye-Agbaje) growing close to his step father before his mother (Danielle Deadwyler) scams him. In the episode proper, Rue Bennett (Zendaya) reflects on her mistakes. Meanwhile, Cassie Jacobs (Sydney Sweeney) auditions for LA Nights.

== Plot ==
As a child, Alamo Brown (Adewale Akinnuoye-Agbaje) is introduced to his mother's (Danielle Deadwyler) new boyfriend Preston, who is kind to young Alamo. After settlement money comes in from the chemical factory that burned Preston's face, he becomes rich. When their new large mansion is robbed, Alamo's mother leaves Preston and moves in with the robber, teaching Alamo never to trust anyone.

In 2024, Rue Bennett (Zendaya) is still buried below her neck. After Alamo swings and misses her head with a polo mallet, Rue convinces him to spare her life by calling Faye Valentine (Chloe Cherry), whose neo-Nazi boyfriend Wayne (Toby Wallace) robbed the Silver Slipper. By promising she can keep the money, Rue makes Faye take a picture of the key to the safe where the stolen goods are kept, knowing Alamo can have a version 3D printed.

Laurie (Martha Kelly), her cousin Harley (James Landry Hébert), and his son Wayne meet with Alamo at his mansion. They threaten to mail what they stole to the FBI if he does not help them smuggle fentanyl across the border with Gold Rush Medical Services, an ambulance company Alamo owns. Drug Enforcement Administration detectives Bowman and Jimenez (Hemky Madera) listen in through Rue's wiretapped phone.

Maddy Perez (Alexa Demie) asks Alamo to give his strippers time off from the Silver Slipper to build their OnlyFans profiles, but he refuses. Jules Vaughn (Hunter Schafer) is visited by Rue, who expresses interest in a serious relationship, including children with Jules. Jules rejects the idea as a fantasy. When Rue says that Jules's sugar daddy does not love her, she slaps Rue, who leaves emotionally devastated.

Filming her scene on LA Nights, Cassie Jacobs (Sydney Sweeney) veers off script, trauma dumping about her disastrous marriage. Producer Patricia Lance (Sharon Stone), and the director (Colleen Camp) believe it is an improvisation and offer to expand her role after her sister Lexi Howard (Maude Apatow) reveals she is a sex worker. Cassie reluctantly deletes her OnlyFans profile at the request of Patricia, who tasks Lexi to write Cassie's storyline.

In a church, Rue gets a phone call from her mother Leslie (Nika King); she tells her she wants to be redeemed. Cassie receives a package containing her husband Nate's (Jacob Elordi) severed finger. Alamo insists Rue be the one to use the new key. Bishop (Darrell Britt-Gibson) tells Rue Alamo bought the Silver Slipper's ball python from the stripper owner after the snake starved itself intending to eat her. Bishop then reveals he met with Leslie. While listening to the Bible in her car, Rue nearly crashes into an eighteen-wheeler, and swerves off the other side of the road, causing her to set a Joshua tree on fire. She interprets this as divine providence, her burning bush.

== Production ==
=== Writing ===
Book of Exodus chapter fourteen verse three starts "And Moses said unto the people, 'Fear ye not. Stand still, and see the salvation of the Lord, which He will show to you today; for the Egyptians whom ye have seen today, ye shall see them again no more for ever.'" The phrase "stand still and see" is then repeated fourteen times in the chapter. This is the origin of the episode's title. This name was chosen due to parallel Rue and Moses, who saw the burning bush like her and seeks the Holy Land (represented as the homestead in Texas Rue visited in season three's premiere "Ándale"). "Oh! Let My People Go" is also sung in the episode at Preston's church, the lyrics of the song cover the same part of Exodus.

=== Filming ===
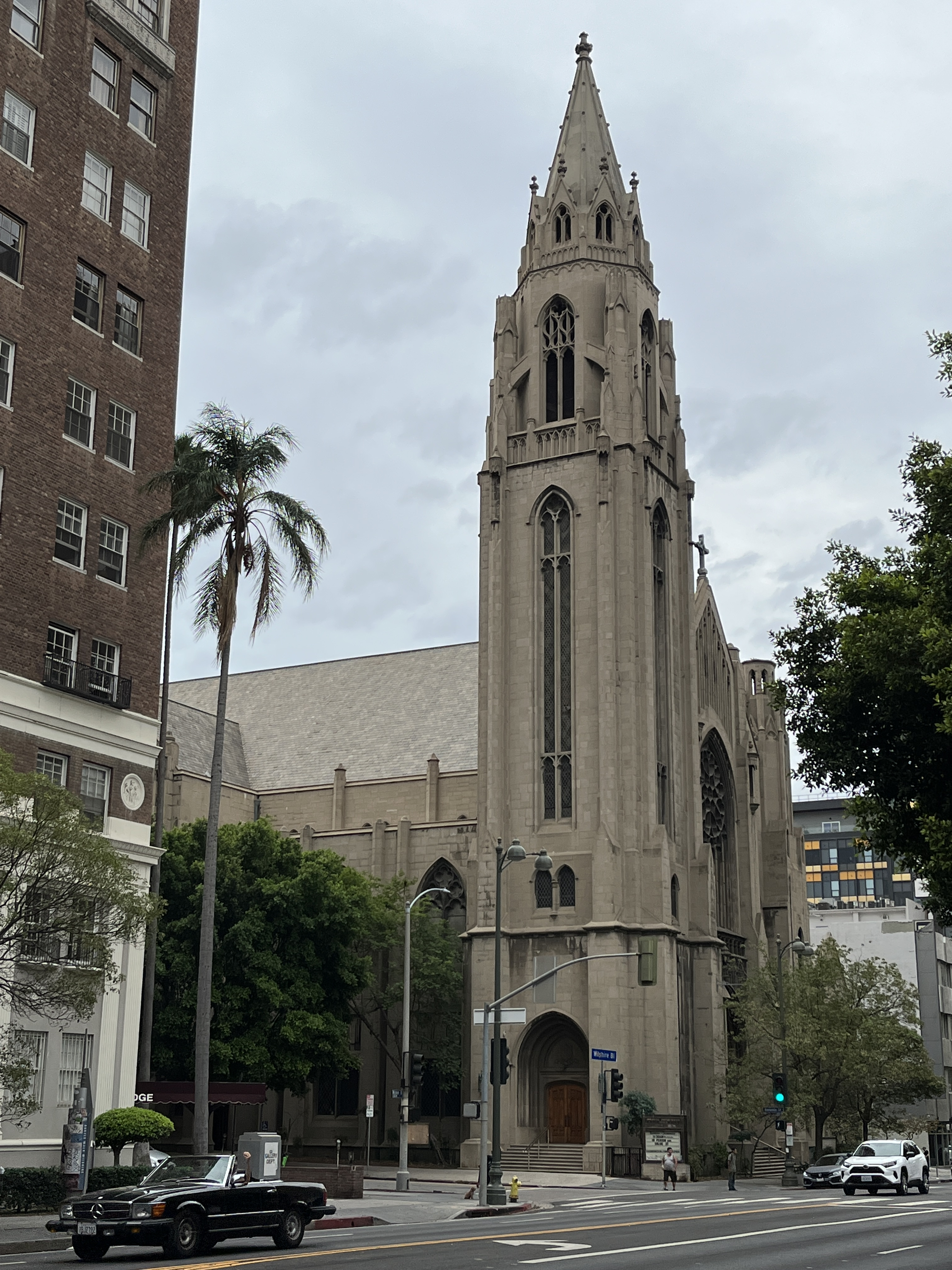
Immanuel Presbyterian Church (Los Angeles, California) was used as a filming location for the episode.

Location shooting for Rue's monologue to her mother on the phone took place at Immanuel Presbyterian Church (Los Angeles, California) on Wilshire Boulevard. On March 6, 2024, King, who is a working stand-up comedian when not acting, made a joke about long gap after season two: "'We need season three!' Bitch, I need season three! I haven’t paid my rent in six months." She added that "Zendaya’s over in Paris at Fashion Week. I’m like, bitch, come home!". Her guest casting was announced on October 17, 2025 (along with Deadwyler's as Mama Brown). But when the episode was eventually broadcast, her role was reduced to a cameo where she utters one line. On her Instagram, King revealed that her mother teased her for the briefness of the scene, despite promoting it.

Production designer François Audouy explained the creation of the burnish bush on a practical level: "It was something that looks like we did nothing, but we did everything. We created a steel structure, sculpted a Joshua tree on top of it, and added real branches on top of that. All of that was plumbed with propane so that it could be lit remotely just in time for the shot." Series creator Sam Levinson added that the symbolic rationale was, "what happens if God gives me some big sign and for some reason I just misinterpret it?" In an official behind-the-scenes video uploaded to YouTube, costume designer Natasha Newman-Thomas revealed that she collaborated with Audouy to make the leg on top of the Silver Slipper, which is Mama Brown's. Bishop's actor Britt-Gibson recommended Kwame Patterson to play Preston, having previously worked with him on The Wire. Hair stylist Kimberly Kimble said of the cold open that "I love when Sam does the flashbacks cuz it gives us insight on the story and it helps us in developing what their hair is."

=== Music ===
Preston leads a prayer at the dinner table while "Mood Indigo" by Duke Ellington plays in the background. "Bad Girls" by Donna Summer plays over a scene of Mama Brown on the phone while Alamo eats. Young Alamo's realization that his mother's relationship with Preston was all an act is set to Marvin Gaye's main theme to the 1972 blaxploitation Trouble Man. "Chulo" by Bad Gyal plays at the Silver Slipper while Maddy is there. "Shake Dat Ass (Twerk Song)" by BossMan Dlow also plays near the end of the episode.

== Reception ==
=== Ratings ===
According to Nielsen Media Research, upon airing "Stand Still and See" was watched by 333,000 people. They estimated that 0.07% of the total 18-49 population in the US was tuning in.

=== Critical reviews ===
Review aggregator Rotten Tomatoes gives the episode an approval score of 80%, based on 5 critical reviews. TVLine named Zendaya their "Performer of the Week" on May 23, 2026 for her work in this episode. The site wrote "Zendaya's eyes filled with radiant hope, though, as Rue kneeled in a church pew, shedding a tear while breaking into a gentle smile. So maybe Rue will get a happy ending after all. But even if she doesn't, Zendaya has still given this season an infusion of raw humanity and reminded us of the towering heights she can reach as a performer." In a B review for The A.V. Club, Emma Fraser wrote that "In a stirring Euphoria, Rue’s religious path starts to take shape, and Alamo gets a backstory. Guest star Danielle Deadwyler steals the show (and a whole lot more) as Alamo’s conniving mother." In a three out of five star review for Vulture, Rafaela Bassili wrote that "At its best, Euphoria is a character study about the kinds of experience that might lead an otherwise well-intentioned person down the wrong path. It’s an argument for nurture over nature, a suggestion that a messed-up environment — whether a broken home or an unjust system — has the power to corrupt even the most innocent spirit. In season three, this argument has largely taken a cynical, nihilistic turn."

One scene depicting Maddy directing a photo shoot with Van Patten's Kitty, Rosalía's Magick and Cassie, in which Cassie is only wearing a skin-coloured thong and a ball python around her neck was criticized by both critics and supporters, with OnlyFans model Sydney Leathers calling the portrayal "infuriating".
