= This Little Piggy (Euphoria) =

- Euphoria episode
- Cassie Jacobs prays to the Hollywood Sign.
- Episode no.: Season 3 Episode 5
- Directed by: Sam Levinson
- Written by: Sam Levinson
- Cinematography by: Marcell Rév
- Editing by: Nikola Boyanov; Aaron I. Butler; Aleshka Ferrero; Julio C. Perez IV
- Original air date: May 10, 2026
- Running time: 61 minutes

Guest appearances
- Sharon Stone as Patricia Lance; Colleen Camp as LA Nights Director; Darrell Britt-Gibson as Bishop; Marshawn Lynch as G; Sam Trammell as Ellis; Kadeem Hardison as Big Eddy; Rebecca Pidgeon as Ms. Penzler; Rosalía as Magick; Hemky Madera as Jimenez; Anna Van Patten as Kitty; Jack Topalian as Naz; Matt Willig as Artur; Asante Blackk as Kidd; Jeff Wahlberg as Brandon Fontaine

Episode chronology
← Previous "Kitty Likes to Dance"	Next → "Stand Still and See"
- Euphoria season 3

"This Little Piggy" is the fifth episode of the third season of the American psychological drama television series Euphoria. The episode was written and directed by series creator Sam Levinson. It originally aired on HBO on May 10, 2026. The title of this episode is a reference to the 1760 nursery rhyme of the same name.

The episode's cold open depicts Cassie Jacobs (Sydney Sweeney) rise to OnlyFans fame under Maddy Perez's (Alexa Demie) management. In the episode proper, Alamo Brown (Adewale Akinnuoye-Agbaje) grows suspicious that Rue Bennett (Zendaya) is an informant for the Drug Enforcement Administration.

"This Little Piggy" received largely mixed reviews. Out of the seven Primetime Emmy Award nominations received by the show for its third season, one was specifically for this episode, Outstanding Production Design for a Narrative Contemporary Program (One Hour or More).

== Plot ==
Cassie Jacobs (Sydney Sweeney) creates more OnlyFans content and spouts manosphere talking points on podcasts to raise her profile. Her manager Maddy Perez (Alexa Demie) chastises her for sending money to her husband Nate (Jacob Elordi). Cassie visualizes herself growing into a giantess and destroying Hollywood.

Alamo Brown (Adewale Akinnuoye-Agbaje) takes out his fury at Big Eddy's (Kadeem Hardison) betrayal on his underling, Kidd (Asante Blackk). Influencer Brandon Fontaine (Jeff Wahlberg) invites Cassie to move into his content house. Nate encourages her to take a suggestive photo with Brandon to make him more money. Bishop (Darrell Britt-Gibson) tortures the security guard who let the robbery of the Silver Slipper take place. Rue Bennett (Zendaya) tells Alamo that Laurie's (Martha Kelly) cousins are probably keeping what they stole in their basement.

Drug Enforcement Administration detectives Bowman and Jimenez (Hemky Madera) have Rue call Laurie to wiretap her phone, but she just hangs up. Instead, she calls Wayne (Toby Wallace) and gets him to incriminate himself. Cassie signs an exclusivity contract with Brandon. When Maddy senses her reticence to inform her, she makes Cassie do it and stages a fake call with the popular soap opera LA Nights to cancel an audition with actor Dylan Reid. This leads Cassie to impulsively sign another contract with Maddy.

Maddy pressures Cassie's younger sister Lexi Howard (Maude Apatow) into helping get Cassie cast. Using her maiden name, Cassie performs a scene from Shakespeare's Antony and Cleopatra. LA Nights' director (Colleen Camp) and producer Patricia Lance (Sharon Stone) are impressed and hire her. Jules Vaughn (Hunter Schafer) is visited by Rue and they have sex.

Later, Jules's sugar daddy Ellis (Sam Trammell) finds Rue's boxers, which have her initials stitched into the back. Ellis threatens to throw her out on the street and abandon her in favor of his wife and children. Nate's celebration upon receiving more money from Cassie is interrupted by Artur (Matt Willig) breaking into his house, chasing him upstairs, re-severing his toe and cutting off his ring finger as punishment for missing a payment for loan shark Naz.

Stripper Magick (Rosalía) accuses Rue of framing her to Alamo. Later, Maddy and Rue meet at a diner, where Maddy says she has reached a state of pure harmony with Cassie. Alamo encounters them, and orders a reluctant Rue into a waiting truck. He then makes a deal with Maddy to recruit his strippers to OnlyFans for her to manage. G (Marshawn Lynch) and Bishop drive Rue to just outside Alamo's mansion and pig farm. They make her dig a hole, after which they bury her up to her neck. At dawn, Alamo rides toward Rue with a polo mallet, ready to strike her head.

== Production ==
=== Writing ===
"This Little Piggy" is nursery rhyme and fingerplay song published in 1760 by an unknown author. This name was chosen due to the opening scene, where Cassie performs a sexual version of the song where she sticks each toe in her mouth. This has extra significance since her husband Nate's toe was cut of in season three episode three "The Ballad of Paladin". Series creator Sam Levinson, who wrote every episode of the series, also tied the title to the plot point of Laurie calling Alamo a "pig", an animal which he owns many of in a farm. In the episode, Nate refers to himself and Cassie as "Bonnie and Clyde" and "Jay-Z and Beyoncé" this is a reference to the title of season one episode five "'03 Bonnie and Clyde", which alludes to Maddy and Nate as the song "'03 Bonnie & Clyde" is written by Jay-Z about Beyoncé.

=== Filming ===
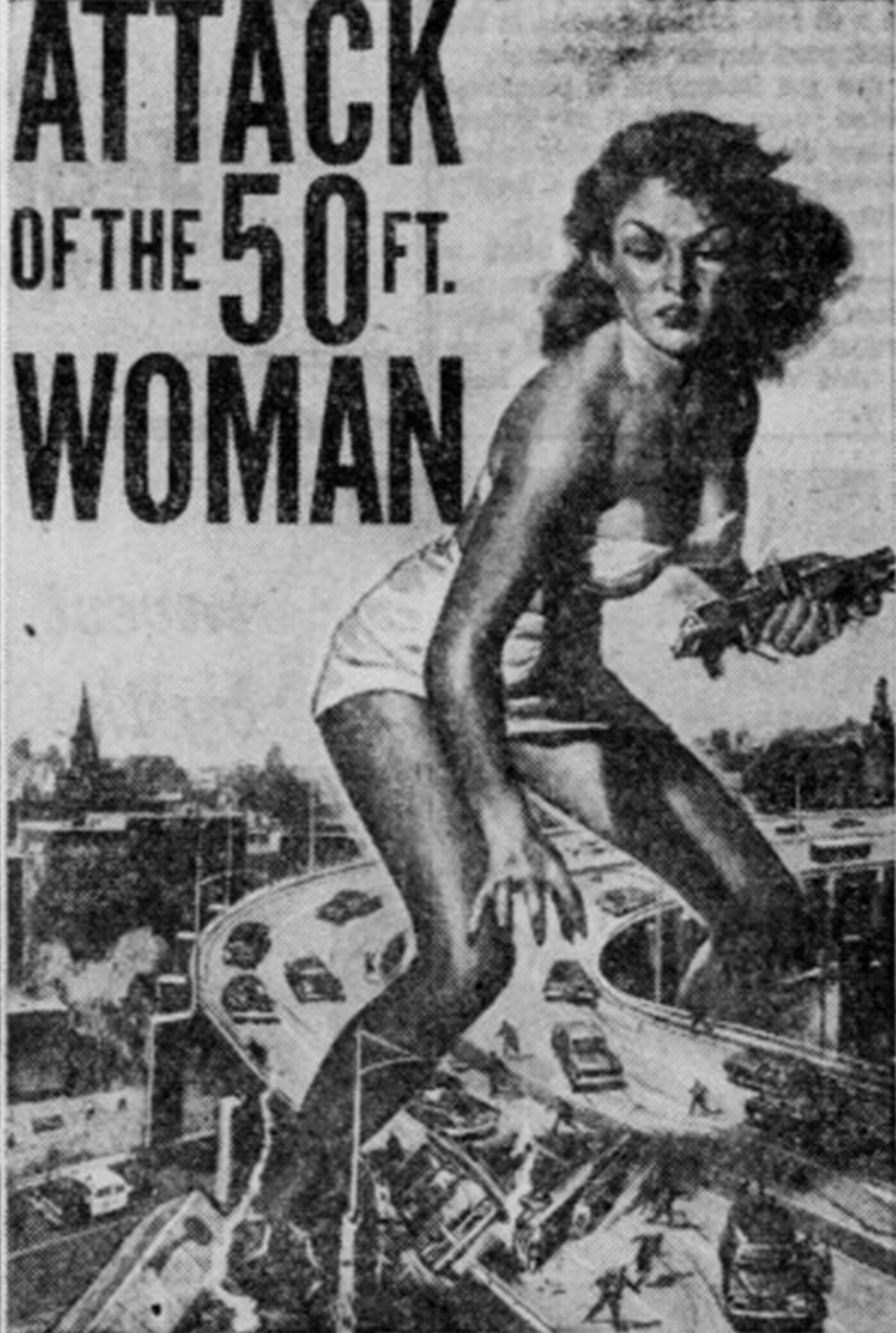
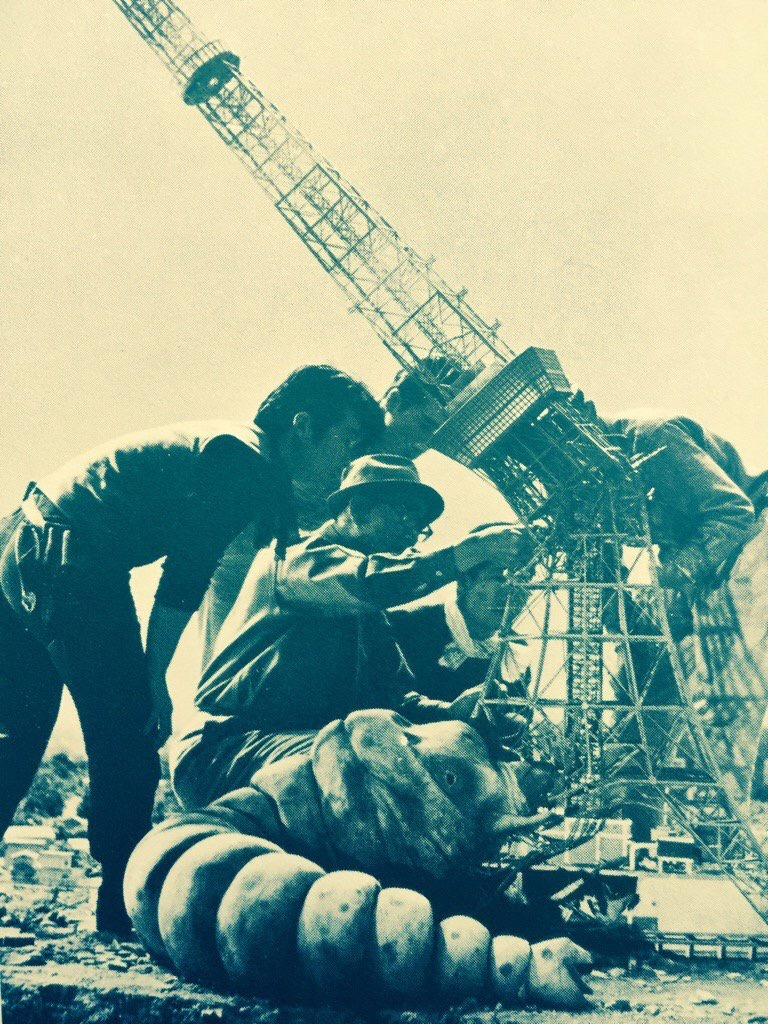
Attack of the 50 Foot Woman (1958) and Mothra (1961) inspired the "Cassie-zilla" sequence.

The episode features a scene which parodies the film Attack of the 50 Foot Woman (1958), where Cassie's online growth is symbolised by her literally growing to Godzilla-sized proportions and destroying a mock up of Hollywood. Production designer François Audouy and visual effects supervisor David Van Dyke spoke to IndieWire on creating the sequence: Audouy said "In Japan, there’s this Tokusatsu miniature tradition that started in the late 1950s with Godzilla. They continued creating these city destruction miniatures for decades, in movie after movie, and we looked at some of those movies for inspiration." Audouy commissioned J.C. Backings to build a 90-foot Translight that would cover the entire back of the sound stage. John Merritt Productions built the forced perspective model of the city. Van Dyke combined disparate frame rates and camera positions to give the illusion that a giant Cassie was moving through space toward a man named Frank, who is masturbating to Cassie's OnlyFans in a skyscraper. A last minute idea from Sweeney and Levinson to have Cassie push her boobs through the building's window was achieved through a giant sculpture on a sled built by KNB EFX Group. The glass was had squibbed to shatter the exact moment the rig hit. It took about a year to create the miniatures, which were in four bigger pieces on wheels. Cinematographer Marcell Rév compared the set's movement to ballet. In an official behind-the-scenes video uploaded to YouTube, Sweeney said "the Cassie-zilla sequence was probably the coolest thing I've ever done. [...] The details were unbelievable."

YouTuber Trisha Paytas makes a cameo appearance in the episode as one of the podcasters Cassie speaks to. Paytas was given no script and her reaction to Cassie saying "if a man today were to say that he wants a girlfriend that can cook or clean, he might as well be screaming the n-word" was genuine. Location shooting for Rue's meeting with DEA agents Bowman and Jimenez took place under the Fourth and Lorena Street Bridge in the Boyle Heights, Los Angeles. For the final scene in which Rue is buried below her neck, a container with a box was built that Rue's actress Zendaya could duck under in case of an earthquake. Two stunt safeties stayed in the hole with oxygen and water. Zendaya was buried for three days of filming. In the behind-the-scenes video, Levinson said "I hand it to Z. She was a real trooper." The scene was Alamo's actor Akinnuoye-Agbaje first time riding a horse, he said in the same video that "my focus was trying to not fall off the horse, and that was nerve-wracking [...] We trained for six weeks to learn how to harness this beautiful horse, and that was really important in conveying a cowboy."

=== Music ===
At Brandon’s content house, influencers make a TikTok dance video set to "Apple" by Charli XCX. Nate dances to "Comin' Home Baby" by Mel Tormé while he drinks orange juice, before Artur smashes his living room window. "The Master's Call" by Marty Robbins plays over the closing credits.

== Reception ==
=== Ratings ===
According to Nielsen Media Research, upon airing "This Little Piggy" was watched by 356,000 people. They estimated that 0.07% of the total 18-49 population in the US was tuning in.

=== Critical reviews ===
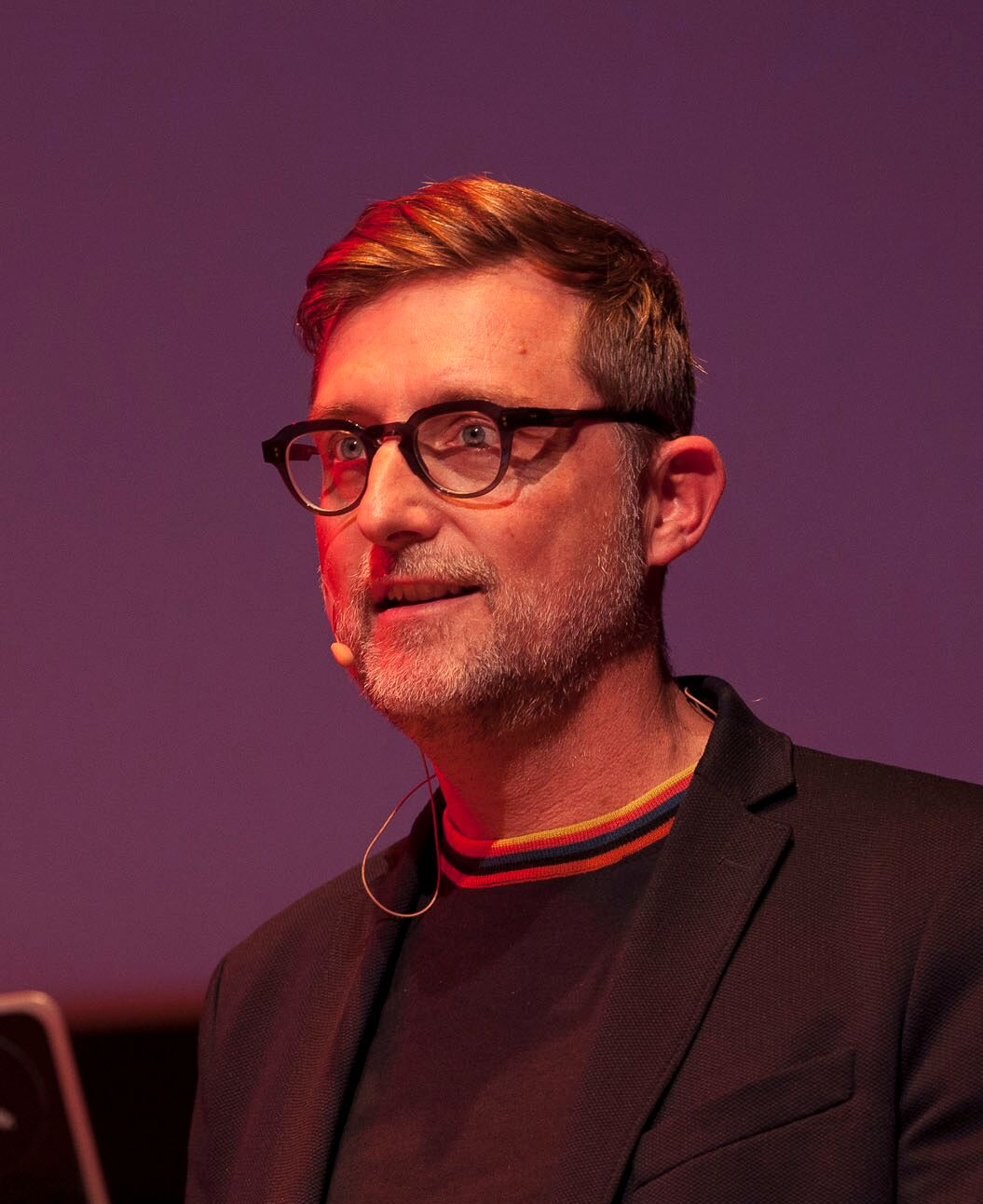
"This Little Piggy" gave François Audouy a Primetime Emmy Award nomination.

The A.V. Club's Emma Fraser wrote "Fantasy has always been core to the storytelling on Euphoria. One of the hallmarks of the first two seasons was switching between the drudgery of high school and the expansive imagination of adolescence. Sometimes daydreams were influenced by drug and alcohol consumption, but it was always clear what was and wasn’t real. Sam Levinson’s HBO drama continues to embrace heightened scenarios, but up until "This Little Piggy", everything depicted in the third season has occurred as it is. So when Cassie’s 50-foot woman stomps over a miniature version of Los Angeles, it offers a taste of Euphoria’s signature blend of reality and illusion. The heavy use of Western and crime genre tropes and scenarios this season adds a heightened element that stretches believability. Having a brief fantastical interlude is a reminder of a previous Euphoria signature in an episode where Rue wishes her nightmare wasn’t real. As the desperate pieces start to come together, Levinson falls into old habits in more ways than one." In a two out of five star review for Vulture, Rafaela Bassili wrote that "As Euphoria’s third season enters its back half, our ensemble’s plotlines are, at long last, converging." But she added that "Nate, as a character, has all but evaporated into Cassie’s outsize arc, which has taken over the season." Rolling Stone's Pie Gonzaga wrote of "This Little Piggy" that "Every new episode of Euphoria Season 3 is a little more dizzying, but so far, Episode 5 takes the cake for the most nauseating or whiplash-inducing tonal shifts. [...] The jokes about show writer and director Sam Levinson wanting to become Quentin Tarantino feel most real in this episode."

After the ending of the episode there was speculation that Rue had died. The "Cassie-zilla" scene was criticized by both critics and supporters, Mashable wrote that "It's a shame, then, that the inventive Cassie-zilla sequence is tied to a hyper-sexualized montage of her OnlyFans work. Euphoria's portrayal of sex work has already earned criticism from sex workers, and it continues to fall into the same trap in episode 5: highlighting fantasies of sex work without actually fleshing out the sex workers themselves. After all, Cassie is little more than a fame-hungry caricature by this point, and as fun as it is to see Euphoria embrace practical monster effects, it's not enough to mask the emptiness and shock value of her narrative."

=== Accolades ===
The episode was Audouy, A. Todd Holland, and Anthony Carlino's submission at the 78th Primetime Creative Arts Emmy Awards, leading them to a nomination for the Primetime Emmy Award for Outstanding Production Design for a Narrative Contemporary Program (One Hour or More).
