= Euphoria season 3 =

2026 television series season

Euphoria
- Season 3
- Promotional poster
- Showrunner: Sam Levinson
- Starring: Zendaya; Hunter Schafer; Jacob Elordi; Sydney Sweeney; Alexa Demie; Maude Apatow; Eric Dane; Adewale Akinnuoye-Agbaje; Martha Kelly; Chloe Cherry; Toby Wallace
- No. of episodes: 8

Release
- Original network: HBO
- Original release: April 12 – May 31, 2026

Season chronology
- ← Previous; Season 2

The third and final season of the American psychological drama (Note: While the first two seasons are teen dramas, all of the characters are adults in season three.) television series Euphoria, inspired by Ron Leshem's miniseries of the same name, premiered on HBO on April 12, 2026. Series creator Sam Levinson serves as showrunner for the season. The season centers on recovering addict young adult Rue Bennett navigating her faith while also being drawn into the illegal drug trade. Zendaya stars as Rue alongside an ensemble cast consisting of Hunter Schafer, Jacob Elordi, Sydney Sweeney, Alexa Demie, Maude Apatow, Eric Dane, Adewale Akinnuoye-Agbaje, Martha Kelly, Chloe Cherry, and Toby Wallace.

In February 2022, Euphoria was renewed for a third season. Filming commenced in February 2025 and wrapped in November. The season consists of eight episodes and received mixed reviews from critics. At the 78th Primetime Emmy and Creative Arts Awards the season was nominated seven times with Zendaya receiving her third nomination for Outstanding Lead Actress in a Drama Series. On May 31, 2026, the same day that the final episode of the third season was released, HBO confirmed that the series had concluded after three seasons.

== Cast and characters ==
=== Main ===
- Zendaya as Rue Bennett
- Hunter Schafer as Jules Vaughn
- Jacob Elordi as Nate Jacobs
- Sydney Sweeney as Cassie Jacobs (née Howard)
- Alexa Demie as Maddy Perez
- Maude Apatow as Lexi Howard
- Eric Dane as Cal Jacobs
- Adewale Akinnuoye-Agbaje as Alamo Brown
- Martha Kelly as Laurie
- Chloe Cherry as Faye Valentine
- Toby Wallace as Wayne

=== Recurring ===
- Sharon Stone as Patricia Lance
- Colleen Camp as LA Nights Director
- Marshawn "Beast Mode" Lynch as G
- Darrell Britt-Gibson as Bishop
- James Landry Hébert as Harley
- Rebecca Pidgeon as Ms. Penzler
- Gideon Adlon as Gillie
- Colman Domingo as Ali Muhammed (né Martin McQueen)
- Asante Blackk as Kidd
- Homer Gere as Dylan Reid
- Madison Thompson as Oceana
- Jessica Blair Herman as Heather
- Daeg Faerch as Mitch
- Melvin "Bonez" Estes as Bruce Sr.
- Rosalía as Magick
- Kadeem Hardison as Big Eddy
- Jeff Wahlberg as Brandon Fontaine
- Sam Trammell as Ellis
- Jack Topalian as Naz
- Matthew Willig as Artur
- Hemky Madera as Jimenez
- William "Bill" Bodner as Bowman
- Anna Van Patten as Kitty

== Episodes ==
No. overall	No. in season	Title	Directed by	Written by	Original release date	U.S. viewers (millions)
19	1	"Ándale"	Sam Levinson	Sam Levinson	April 12, 2026	0.356
Five years after high school, Rue Bennett's friend group has splintered. Lexi Howard is a production assistant on a Warner Bros. television series; Maddy Perez is an actors' talent manager; Lexi's sister Cassie and Nate Jacobs are engaged, with Cassie pursuing fame as an erotic influencer; and Rue is a drug mule for Laurie, who demands an enormous debt. Fleeing across the Mexico–United States border, Rue encounters a devout Christian family. Reflecting upon her encounter with the family, and with some prodding from her sponsor, Ali Muhammad, she reconsiders faith in a higher power—her "third step". Lexi tells Rue that Jules Vaughn is sugar dating. Cassie decides to start selling pornographic content on OnlyFans to help pay for her dream wedding. Nate, trying to resurrect his father's construction company, dislikes the idea, but relents after Cassie agrees to hide her face. Rue delivers drugs to a party at strip-club mogul Alamo Brown's mansion. Rue asks Alamo for a job. One of Alamo's strippers, Tish, overdoses on a fentanyl-laced pill. Rue lets Alamo shoot an apple off her head, earning his trust.
20	2	"America My Dream"	Sam Levinson	Sam Levinson	April 19, 2026	0.325
Maddy's career as a talent manager stalls after the COVID-19 pandemic, leading her to manage influencers until she is forced to drop a client who becomes too close to one of her boss's actors. Alamo recruits Rue to help cover up Tish's death and manage the floor at a strip club. When Laurie insults Alamo by calling him a "pig", he retaliates by sending a large pig to her house. Rue has a brief relationship with a stripper named Angel, who is shaken by Tish's disappearance. When Rue reveals the truth, Angel spirals; with Alamo's approval, Rue stages an intervention and takes her to a rehab center. Cassie asks Maddy to help build her online presence, and she agrees. Indebted to loan sharks, Nate tries to recruit investors from his neighborhood, but one withdraws after discovering Cassie's OnlyFans and learning about Nate's finances. Nate forces Cassie to delete the account in exchange for her dream wedding. Rue visits Jules at her penthouse apartment. A resentful Jules initially chides Rue for judging her work before inviting her to take a bath with her.
21	3	"The Ballad of Paladin"	Sam Levinson	Sam Levinson	April 26, 2026	0.399
While in art school, Jules is introduced to sugaring by her roommate. She becomes the paid mistress of a plastic surgeon, Ellis, who provides her with an apartment and the resources to quit school and focus on painting, and engages in extreme BDSM with her. Meanwhile, Rue starts trafficking 3D-printed firearms for Alamo while pondering leaving organized crime. Tensions rise when Laurie retaliates against Alamo by releasing a pig at his strip club. He plans to get revenge by killing her pet cockatoo, Paladin. Rue, Jules, and Maddy attend Cassie's and Nate's wedding, where Nate's loan shark, Naz, publicly intimidates the couple. Jules shares conciliatory moments with Nate and Cal, while Maddy is overcome with emotion and leaves. Rue departs to pick up drugs from Laurie to cover for Alamo's henchman Bishop poisoning Paladin. Cassie breaks down and injures Nate; they reconcile briefly before Naz and a thug attack Nate at home, beating him and cutting off his toe. Rue's car is pulled over by Drug Enforcement Administration officers.
22	4	"Kitty Likes to Dance"	Sam Levinson	Sam Levinson	May 3, 2026	0.387
To avoid a long prison sentence, Rue becomes a DEA informant for an investigation into Laurie's drug trade, but Rue assumes that Alamo will never do business with Laurie again. When Rue offers to set up a fake buy in Mexico, Alamo becomes suspicious of her motives. Cassie leaves Nate, moves in near Lexi, and resumes her OnlyFans career with Maddy as her manager. Nate's last-ditch attempt to gain funding for his development is denied, and he has an emotional breakdown in public. Lexi hires Jules to paint a picture for her soap opera. Jules's painting depicts penises, which the show's producers cannot broadcast. Jules is forced to cover them up, offending her and hurting Lexi's standing with her boss. Maddy has Cassie feign romantic interest in a social media star at his house to promote her OnlyFans. Rue expresses concern to Angel's replacement, Kitty, after learning that Angel fled rehab and seeing Kitty have violent group sex in a private room. Magick, another stripper, overhears and nearly blows Rue's cover, but is interrupted when Laurie's squad raids the club, shoots the club manager Big Eddy, and robs the safe.
23	5	"This Little Piggy"	Sam Levinson	Sam Levinson	May 10, 2026	0.356
Maddy pushes Cassie to create more erotic content after benefiting from Brandon Fontaine's fame, while Nate, who regularly receives money from Cassie to pay his debt, supports her career. Brandon invites Cassie to move into his house, and she signs his contract. Maddy stages a fake canceled audition, leading Cassie to immediately sign another contract, and pressures Lexi into helping get Cassie cast. Meanwhile, Nate misses a payment to Naz, who sends one of his henchmen to attack Nate, re-severing his toe and cutting off his finger. Alamo spots Rue alone for the first time since the robbery and tells her that Laurie wants to meet. Rue informs DEA agents, who make her call Laurie to arrange a wiretap. Laurie hangs up, but Rue gets Wayne to incriminate himself instead. At the club, Magick accuses Rue of setting her up to Alamo. He later finds Rue with Maddy at a diner, orders Rue into a waiting truck, and makes a deal with Maddy to recruit strippers for his club. Rue is taken to Alamo's mansion and buried up to her neck. At dawn, Alamo rides toward her, swinging a polo mallet, ready to strike her head.
24	6	"Stand Still and See"	Sam Levinson	Sam Levinson	May 17, 2026	0.333
As a child, Alamo finally finds stability when his mother begins dating Preston, a caring but disfigured man who treats them well and becomes wealthy enough to improve their lives. But after their house is robbed, Alamo's mother leaves Preston and moves in with the robber, leaving Alamo's trust in women shaken. In the present, Rue betrays Faye to save herself from Alamo's death threat, convincing Faye to help rob Laurie, who later blackmails Alamo into using his smuggling operation to transport fentanyl across the border; DEA agents listen in through Rue's wiretapped phone. Rue expresses interest in a serious relationship to Jules, who rejects the idea as a fantasy. When Rue criticizes her relationship with Ellis, Jules slaps her. Cassie earns an acting job on the condition that she delete her OnlyFans profile, which she reluctantly does, and Lexi is tasked to write her storyline. Cassie receives a package containing one of Nate's severed fingers. Alamo insists that Rue steal the money from Laurie's safe. Rue survives a car crash that sets a tree on fire, which she interprets as divine providence.
25	7	"Rain or Shine"	Sam Levinson	Sam Levinson	May 24, 2026	0.308
Years earlier, Ali nearly died from drug abuse. He enters rehab and dedicates himself to mentoring recovering youngsters. In the present, Rue undergoes a spiritual awakening but is met with skepticism from Lexi and Ali. Despite Ali's warnings, she returns to Laurie and, with Faye's help, attempts to steal the money from the safe for Alamo; when they discover IDs belonging to Alamo’s strippers, Faye panics and yells for Wayne. Meanwhile, Maddy is fired, and Cassie loses her television role because of her reputation as a sex worker. After Nate is buried alive by Naz's gang over unpaid debts, Naz gives Cassie 72 hours to repay the debt and later takes her hostage as leverage. Cassie turns to Maddy for help. Maddy seduces Alamo to secure the ransom, inadvertently revealing Rue's involvement with the DEA. During the exchange, Alamo kills Naz and frees Cassie. Nate is dug up but found dead from a rattlesnake bite, leaving Cassie devastated. Alamo reminds Maddy that she and Cassie still owe him for his intervention.
26	8	"In God We Trust"	Sam Levinson	Sam Levinson	May 31, 2026	0.461
Rue escapes Laurie's ranch with G's help after injuring Wayne and running from Harley. As the DEA closes Laurie's operation, Alamo takes control of a fentanyl shipment by switching vehicles. Facing arrest, Laurie hangs herself. Wayne and Faye flee the scene. Alamo gives Rue money and Percocet pills secretly containing fentanyl, and she dies from an overdose, with Ali finding her the next day. Three months later, Ali attends his final recovery meeting, where he says he has lost faith and will try to make the world a better place by other means. Cassie and Maddy plan to turn Nate's house into an influencer business and Cassie invites Lexi to join, but she refuses. Jules mourns Rue by painting her portrait. Alamo tells Maddy he intends to marry her but Ali shows up at Alamo's strip club to confront him. Ali kills G before Alamo challenges him to a duel. After Bishop secretly unloads Alamo's gun, Ali shoots and kills Alamo. Bishop leaves with Maddy. Ali visits the Christian family Rue met in Texas, introduces himself by his birth name, and leads a prayer, during which Rue appears peacefully in a vision.

== Production ==
=== Development ===
Sam Levinson's adaptation of the Israeli television series Euphoria created by Ron Leshem was renewed for a third season on February 4, 2022. On September 19, HBO CEO Casey Bloys said the series would not end after the third season. Production of the season was set to start in February 2023. The producers were aiming for a late 2023 release. However, according to a Vogue interview with Lexi's actress Maude Apatow, filming was set to start in the second half of 2023. On a podcast, series costume designer Heidi Bivens said that preparations would begin in May 2023, with filming starting in June. The season's production was one of many disrupted by the 2023 Writers Guild of America strike. Co-producer for half the episodes of season 2, Jeremy O. Harris spoke on the impact it had on the season with Variety, "He's not a scab. David Zaslav [Warner Bros. Discovery CEO], make a deal. That's what I'll say about season 3 of Euphoria. Make a deal, David. It's easy. Just come to that table."

Pre-production for the third season had begun by December 2023. On March 12, 2024, Sydney Sweeney said in an MTV interview with Josh Horowitz that filming for the third season was due to "start soon". But on March 25, it was reported that shooting was postponed indefinitely amid speculation that the series would not return. On July 12, HBO announced that cast members had signed on for a third season that would aim for a January 2025 start date. In August, while appearing on an episode Alex Cooper's podcast Call Her Daddy, Hunter Schafer said, "The real tea is I have no fucking idea what's going on" with production on the series' third season. Zendaya said she did not "really have much of an answer" for the future of Euphoria other than it was set to start filming in January 2025. Colman Domingo said that Levinson had "told me some of it, and it's going to be groundbreaking."

Angus Cloud's death from a drug overdose on July 31, 2023, impacted Levinson's teleplays. Speaking to The New York Times, he said "I had a good portion of it done before the strike [began in May 2023]. Angus was the backbone of that season. I used to even talk to him about it because I wanted him to stay clean. So I would invite him over and I'd tell him what the plans were for the character. I'd say, look, he's been in prison for a few years, so you've got to get that yoked prison body. Because I wanted him to start working out and taking care of himself. You know, season 1 he was supposed to die at the end and I couldn't do it.

On May 31, 2026, the same day that the final episode of the third season was released, HBO confirmed that the series had concluded after three seasons. In an interview with The New York Times, Levinson elaborated on his decision to end the series and stated: "In terms of the story that we set out to tell, which is a story about addiction and its consequences, this feels like the end to me". He noted that the final episode, which features archival footage of Cloud's character Fezco, also acted as a tribute to Cloud and said, "It was a way of honoring Angus and saying a prayer for the future".

=== Casting ===
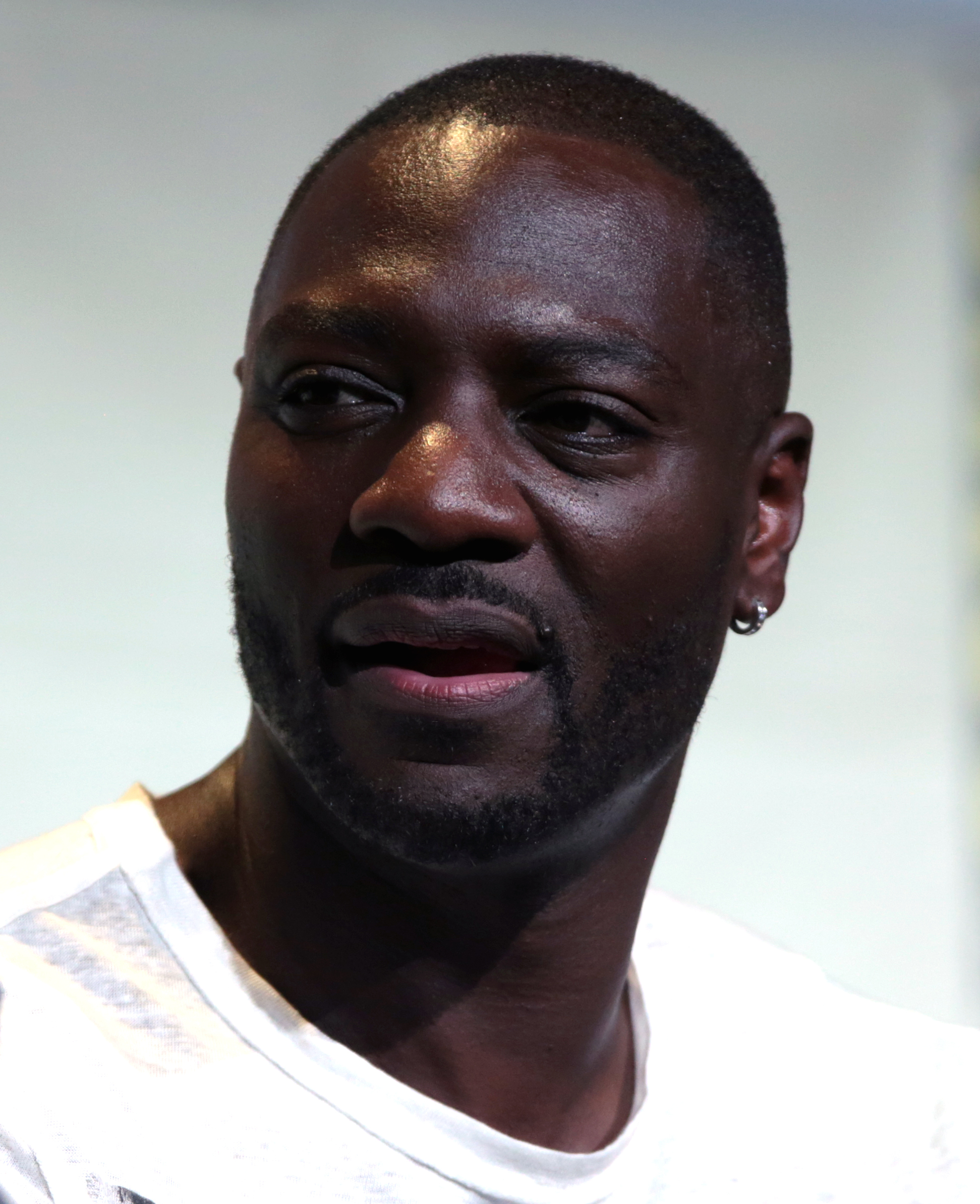
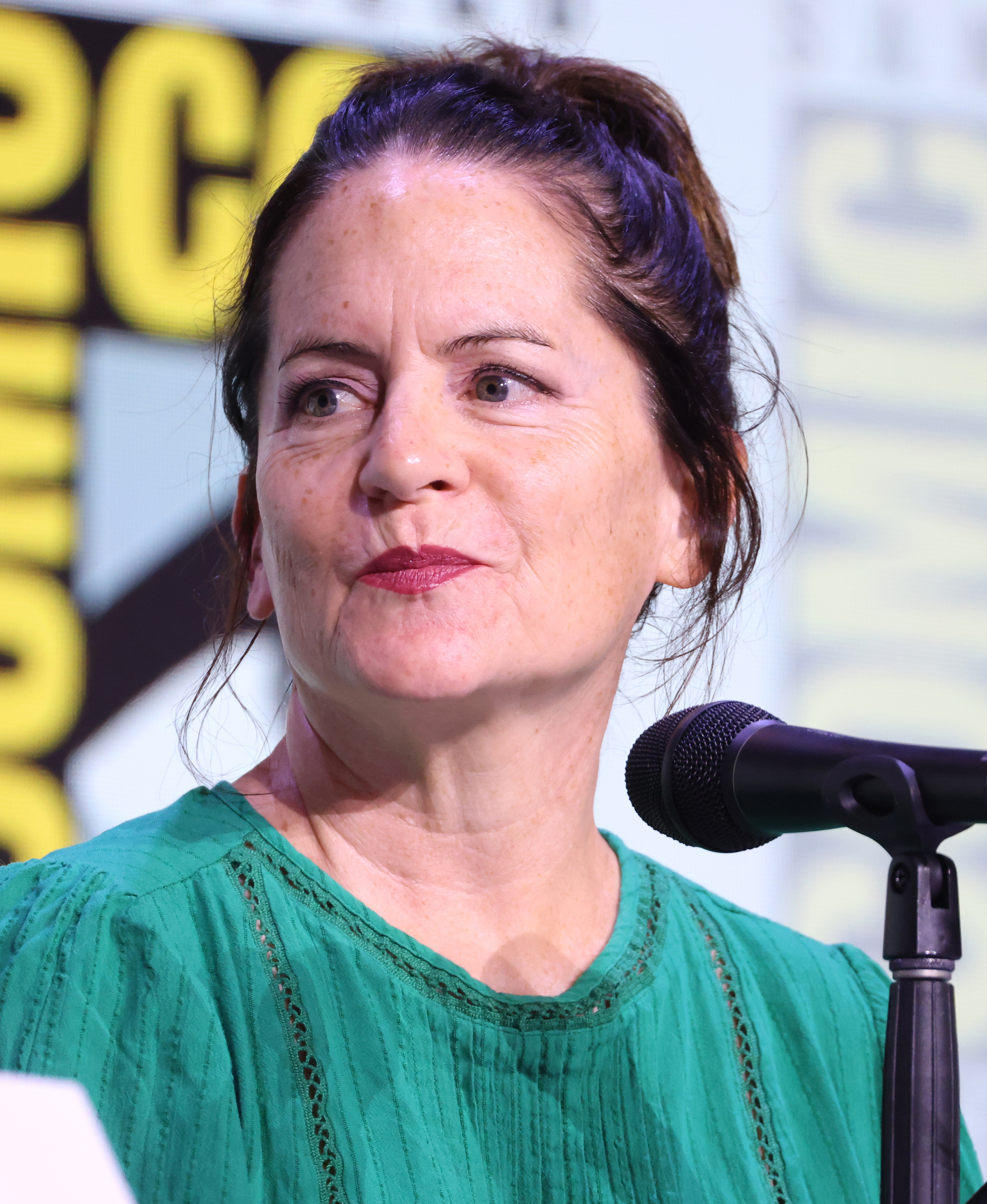
Adewale Akinnuoye-Agbaje and Martha Kelly joined Euphoria's main cast in season 3.

Of the main cast from season 2, only seven returned in leading roles; Zendaya, Schafer, Sweeney, Apatow, Jacob Elordi, Alexa Demie, and Eric Dane. On February 19, 2026, Dane died of ALS after having completed his work on the season. Nika King, who portrayed Leslie Bennett, was demoted to a guest star. Barbie Ferreira, who portrayed Kat Hernandez, announced via Instagram on August 24, 2022 her decision to leave the series. She elaborated in a statement on April 5, 2023: "I just felt like, maybe it's like I overstayed my welcome a little bit. So for me, I actually felt good to be like, 'Okay, I get to not worry about this, and we both don't get too worried about this', because it's exhausting." Storm Reid, who portrayed Gia Bennett, was confirmed to not return in November 2024, with Algee Smith and Austin Abrams, who portrayed Chris McKay and Ethan Daley respectively, departing in February 2025. Javon Walton's character Ashtray died in season 2. Dominic Fike's character Elliot was reported to appear in the season, but did not.

Season 2 guest stars Martha Kelly and Chloe Cherry, who portrayed Laurie and Faye Valentine respectively, were promoted to the main cast. Adewale Akinnuoye-Agbaje and Toby Wallace also joined the main cast as Alamo Brown and Wayne. Rosalía, Marshawn "Beast Mode" Lynch, Kadeem Hardison, Darrell Britt-Gibson, Priscilla Delgado, James Landry Hébert, Anna Van Patten, Sharon Stone and Asante Blackk were also announced to have joined the cast in recurring roles. Lynch, Britt-Gibson, and Black all initially auditioned for the role of Alamo before being assigned their parts. Rosalía's song "Malamente" had appeared in season 1 episode five "'03 Bonnie and Clyde, and she co-wrote "Lo Vas a Olvidar" with Billie Eilish for the 2021 special episode "Fuck Anyone Who's Not a Sea Blob". Hardison previously worked with Zendaya on her Disney Channel series K.C. Undercover, playing her character's father, Craig Cooper. In October, Colleen Camp, Gideon Adlon, Hemky Madera, Homer Gere, Jack Topalian, Jessica Blair Herman, Madison Thompson, Matthew Willig, Rebecca Pidgeon, and Sam Trammell joined the cast in more recurring roles.

=== Filming ===
Principal photography for season 3 began in January 2025 and wrapped on November 15. The scenes set inside the strip club were shot first, in January. Filming was officially announced on February 10. Zendaya and Priscilla Delgado were spotted filming a scene from episode 2 on February 28. In March, Demie was shooting scenes from episode 5 with Akinnuoye-Agbaje. Domingo filmed some of his scenes involving Zendaya in March and returned to film the rest in July. Elordi and Dane started shooting in April. The wedding scenes were shot at the end of April. As a result of her busy schedule, Zendaya was forced to shoot all her scenes in a truncated timeline, saying: "It was a whirlwind. I did what I do in eight months in like four months. It was like trying to get eight episodes in at once. It just flew by me". She wrapped her scenes in June. Fike reportedly filmed a scene in September 2025, while Schafer was also filming. Elordi wrapped his scenes in October and Sweeney filmed her final scenes in November.

The season was shot entirely on Kodak film stock. While the specials and season 2 were shot entirely in Super 35, season 3 was shot on 35 mm film with Arricam LT cameras and Panavision anamorphic lenses, and on 65 mm film with the Arriflex 765. Kodak created a film stock, Verita 200D 5206, in both formats specifically for the season. The aspect ratio also changed: season 1 was mostly in 16:9, season 2 mostly in widescreen, and season 3 is mostly in CinemaScope. Levinson said: "Giving it a bit more objectivity [..] I wanted to kind of open up the frame a little bit more and—and feel the world around [the characters] and sometimes how small they are. And it—it just added to the danger and also just thematically, you know, the idea that we're kind of getting outside of the emotional melodramatic aspects of psychology and more into what real life is."

Location shooting for the season took place at sites including a horse community in Lancaster, California, a tobacco shop on Victory Boulevard in Van Nuys, Grauman's Chinese Theatre on the Hollywood Walk of Fame, Valli Tropics Apartments in North Hollywood, Los Angeles, Warner Bros. Studios Burbank, a home in Lakewood, California, SJR Theatre in Burbank, California, a mansion overlooking Lake Palmdale, Point Dume in Malibu, California, a former liquor market in Pearblossom, California, The Roof Garden in Santa Monica, California, The Langham Huntington, Pasadena, an estate in the Hollywood Hills, Fourth and Lorena Street Bridge in the Boyle Heights, Los Angeles, Immanuel Presbyterian Church on Wilshire Boulevard, New Life Community Church in Lincoln Heights, Los Angeles, The Peninsula Beverly Hills, and Huntington Park, California, and West Olive Avenue in Burbank.

=== Music ===
Season 3 is the only Euphoria season not scored by British composer Labrinth. On July 23, 2025, he announced he was working with German composer Hans Zimmer for the season. But on March 13, 2026, Labrinth posted an Instagram story that read, "Fuck Columbia. Double Fuck Euphoria. I'm out. Thank you and good night." Labrinth removed all his music from the show, leaving Zimmer as the sole music composer. A soundtrack album with twenty three tracks was released by Sony Music Entertainment and Milan Records on May 29, 2026.

== Release ==
Season 3 was promoted with the tagline "May God have mercy". Many of the episode titles are references to Westerns and the Bible. The premiere screened at Coachella 2026 on April 2, 2026. The season had its red carpet premiere on April 7, 2026. In the United States, the season premiered on April 12, 2026, with its finale was released on May 31. In the United Kingdom and the Republic of Ireland, each episode was released at the same time as its U.S. premiere, through Sky Atlantic's streaming service Now.

== Reception ==
=== Critical response ===
Professional ratings
Aggregate scores
Source	Rating
Rotten Tomatoes	44%
Metacritic	56/100
Review scores
Source	Rating
BBC News	2/5 stars
Digital Spy	2/5 stars
Empire	3/5 stars
The Independent	4/5 stars

Euphoria season 3 was met with a mixed response from critics, with praise limited to the ensemble's acting and the visuals, but criticism of its writing, pacing, characterization, tone, music, and handling of mature subject matter. The critical consensus on review aggregator website Rotten Tomatoes reads, "Euphoria returns with less than the sum of its parts in a disjointed cavalcade of forced narratives that leave its talented cast stranded in the wind." The season has an overall approval rating of 44%, with an average rating of 5.8/10 based on 76 critical reviews. Using a weighted average, Metacritic assigned the season a score of 56 out of 100, based on 27 critics, which it describes as "Mixed or Average".

Caryn James wrote for BBC News: "the show has lost its zeitgeisty edge. Euphoria has become a series with very little to say, none of it very audacious or compelling." David Opie of Digital Spy wrote, "Euphoria was a striking, standout coming-of-age drama, but the new season doesn't capture its magic. The show hasn't grown up in the same way that these kids supposedly have." Empire's Al Horner wrote, "some constants remain, the good and bad of Euphoria past. This is still a sumptuously-shot show, not to mention a well-acted one: Zendaya in particular is in formidable form once more, letting glints of sadness surface from beneath Rue's veneer of languid detachment. Less appealing is how the camera still hovers longingly over shots of its female characters' bodies, as one-by-one, Levinson's scripts nudge them into sex work and skimpy costumes. A common criticism of the showrunner is that there's seldom much insight or commentary to go with the degradation of the women in his work. Two episodes into Euphoria Season 3, that criticism is yet to be answered." In a positive review for The Independent, Nick Hilton called the season a "generation-defining show paints a clear-eyed, unflattering portrait of modern America."

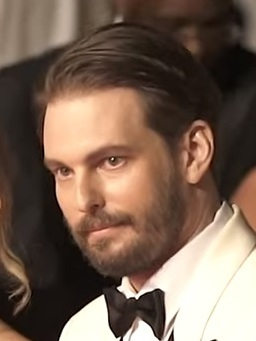
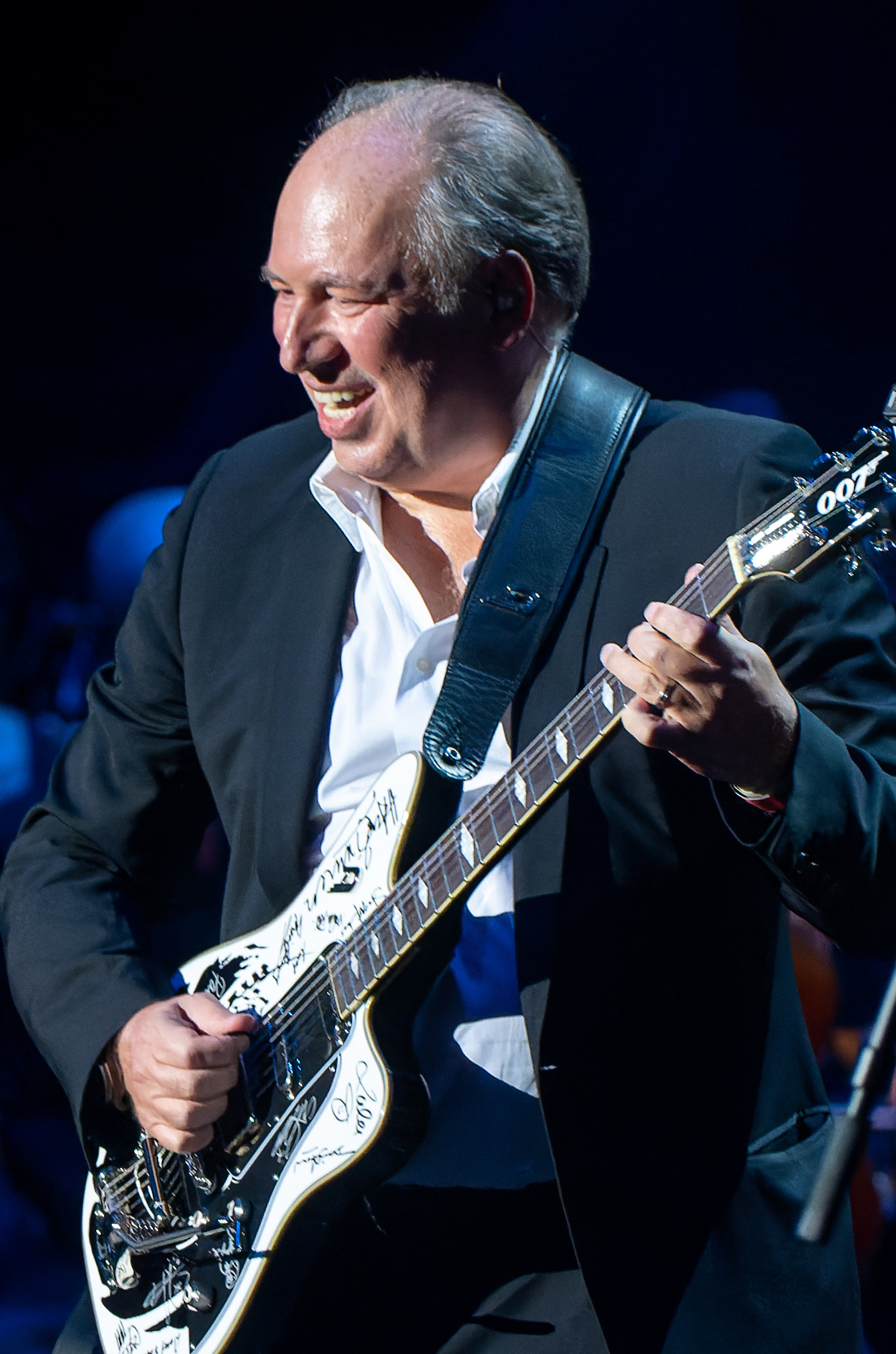
Sam Levinson's writing and Hans Zimmer's score were criticized.

Several reviewers criticized the season's shift in tone and genre from the first two seasons. Alyssa Mora of IGN called the season a "stark disappointment", writing, "While the cast does its best with the material, the show has become an off-the-rails crime drama with little resemblance to the series fans have come to enjoy." Shirley Li wrote in The Atlantic, "As I watched, I often thought of Industry, another scandalous HBO drama that evolved significantly in its latest outing. On that show, the major investment bank the young protagonists worked for closed, leaving the tight-knit group scattered and prompting a major cast member to exit the series. Industry has thrived in its reinvention, however, in large part because it expanded its scope beyond the trading floor and challenged its characters' beliefs about wealth and power. Euphoria doesn't interrogate how the passage of time has affected its ensemble—why and how they've changed, beyond the job titles and social status they've acquired. If anything, the ensemble now resembles caricatures of scandalous 20-somethings. The fragile world that Euphoria built—a world that improbably balanced the shocking with the heartfelt—has collapsed."

Critics and viewers panned Zimmer's score. Carly Thomas of The Hollywood Reporter wrote, "No one is criticizing Zimmer's abilities; his credits and accolades speak for themselves. But when a show's unique tone has already been established, like what Labrinth originated in the first two seasons, a sudden sonic shift to stray away from that sound can cause whiplash for viewers. That's apparent even in just the first half of season three." Music supervisor Kier Lehman told the magazine: "that's important, especially in a longer series, to establish a sound and themes for characters or themes for situations, [...] And of course, that's going to evolve as the series goes on, but I think it's also really helpful in helping the audience and grounding the audience in the show." Decider wrote: "Instead of Labrinth's stylish needle drops and timely musical picks that grounded the series as a moody teen drama, this dramatic season has been backed by several tranquil melodies fans are describing as 'all inclusive resort elevator ass music.'"

=== Ratings ===
On linear television, the third season of Euphoria has an average of 366,000 US viewers per episode. Including people watching on HBO Max, season 3 logged over 25,000,000 views.

=== Accolades ===
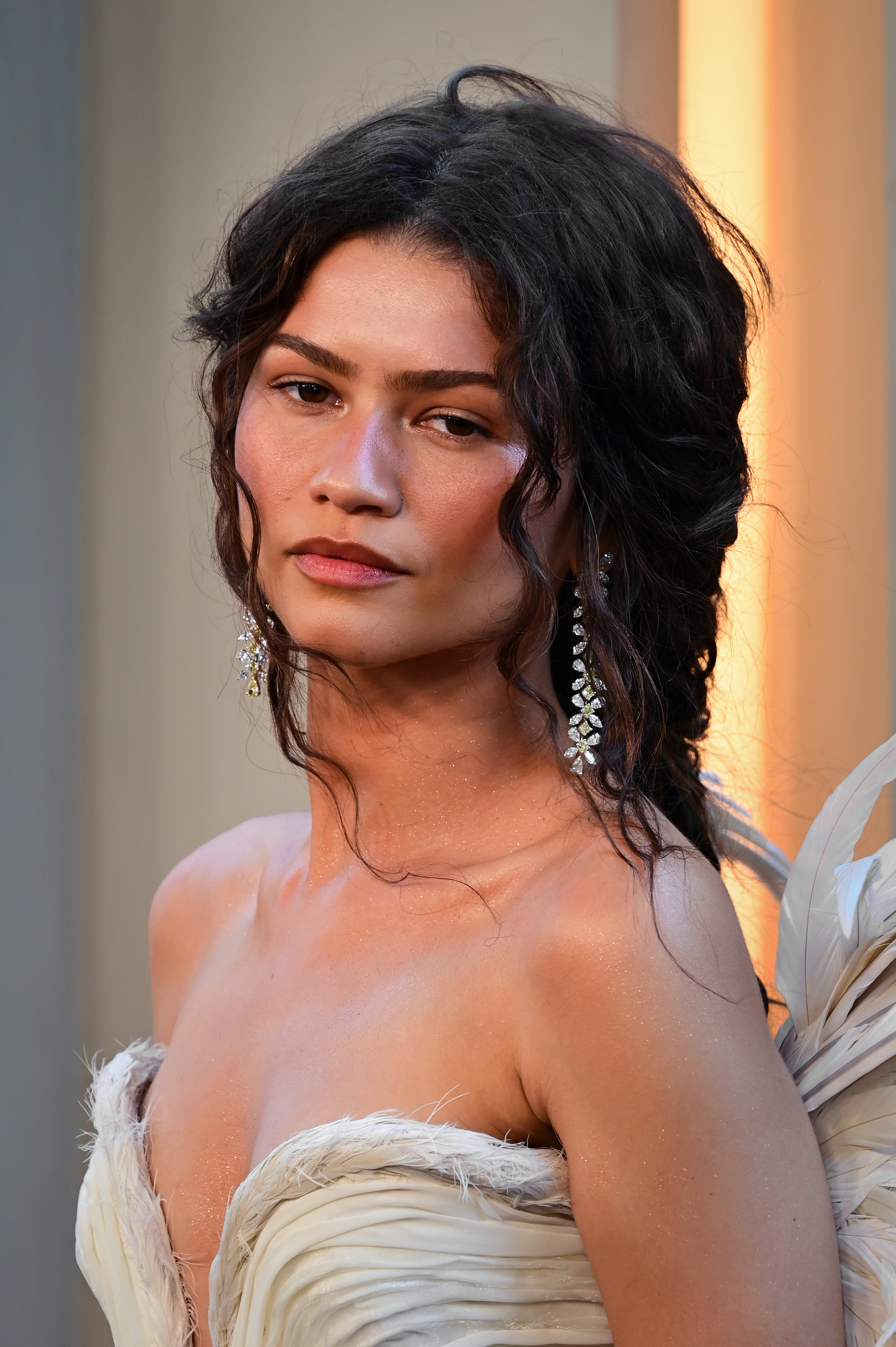
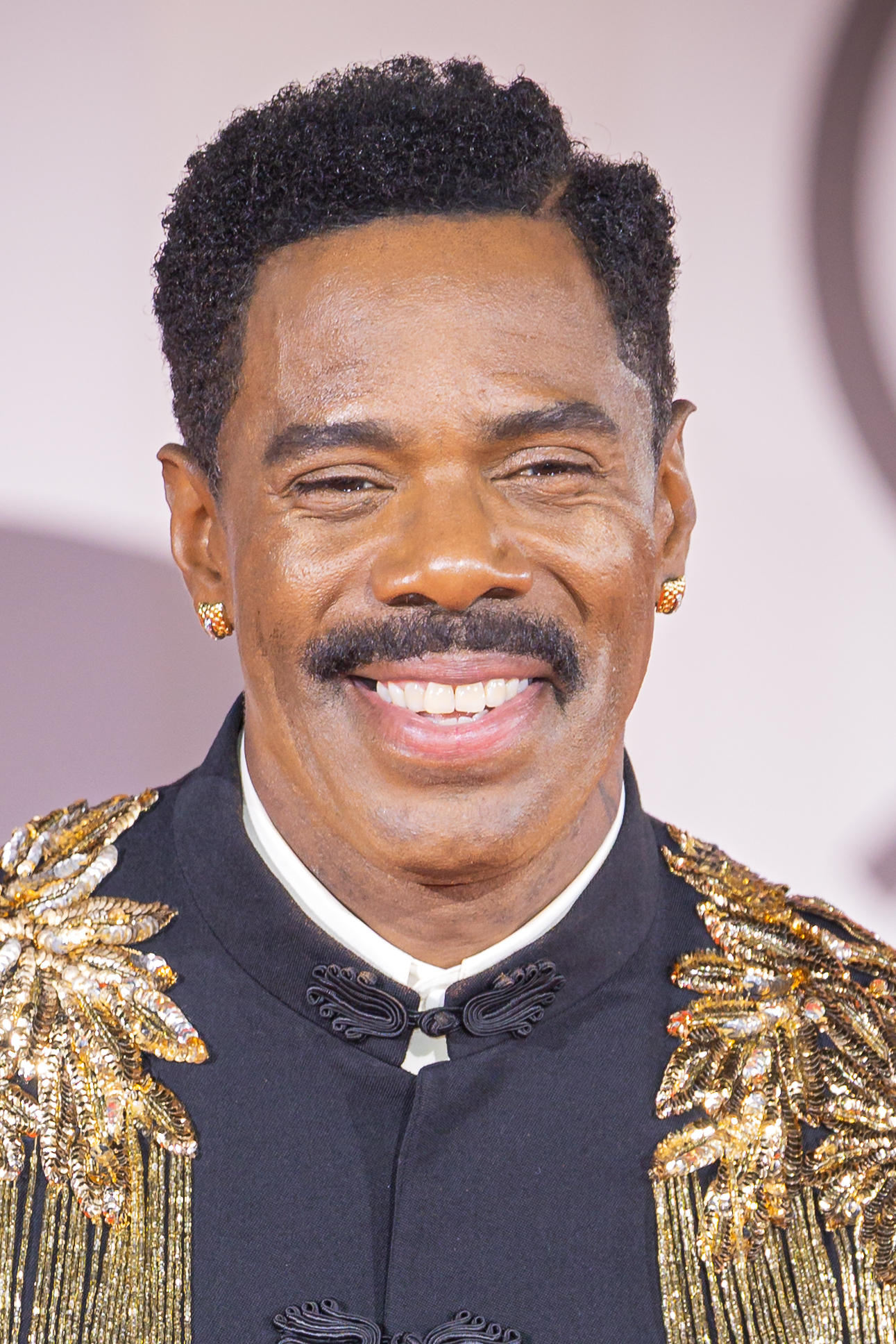
Zendaya and Colman Domingo both were nominated for Primetime Emmy Awards for season 3.

The Academy of Television Arts & Sciences acknowledged season 3 at their Primetime Emmy Award ceremonies seven times. At the 78th Primetime Emmy Awards, the season got one nomination; Zendaya's turn in episode eight "In God We Trust" was nominated for her third Outstanding Lead Actress in a Drama Series. At the 78th Primetime Creative Arts Emmy Awards, the season was nominated for Outstanding Guest Actor in a Drama Series (Domingo for the series finale), Outstanding Cinematography for a Series (One Hour) (Marcell Rév for the series finale), Outstanding Picture Editing for a Drama Series (Nikola Boyanov, Aleshka Ferrero, Aaron I. Butler, Julio C. Perez IV, and Kristin Valentine for "In God We Trust"), Outstanding Production Design for a Narrative Contemporary Program (One Hour or More) (François Audouy, A. Todd Holland, and Anthony Carlino for episode five "This Little Piggy"), Outstanding Hairstyling (Kimberly Kimble, Kendra Garvey, Kase Glenn, Marquita Lynch, and Stacy Schneiderman for episode three "The Ballad of Paladin"), and Outstanding Makeup (Non-Prosthetic) (Doniella Davy, Mara Rouse, Tara Lang Shah, and Leah Rial Sappington for episode four "Kitty Likes to Dance").
