= Ándale =

- Euphoria episode
- Rue Bennett leaves her car on the border wall.
- Episode no.: Season 3 Episode 1
- Directed by: Sam Levinson
- Written by: Sam Levinson
- Cinematography by: Marcell Rév
- Editing by: Nikola Boyanov; Aaron I. Butler; Aleshka Ferrero; Julio C. Perez IV
- Original air date: April 12, 2026
- Running time: 61 minutes

Guest appearances
- Sharon Stone as Patricia Lance; Colleen Camp as LA Nights Director; Marshawn Lynch as G; Darrell Britt-Gibson as Bishop; James Landry Hébert as Harley; Rebecca Pidgeon as Ms. Penzler; Gideon Adlon as Gillie; Colman Domingo as Ali Muhammad; Asante Blackk as Kidd; Homer Gere as Dylan Reid; Jessica Blair Herman as Heather; Madison Thompson as Oceana

Episode chronology
← Previous "All My Life, My Heart Has Yearned for a Thing I Cannot Name"	Next → "America My Dream"
- Euphoria season 3

"Ándale" is the third season premiere of the American psychological drama television series Euphoria. The episode was written and directed by series creator Sam Levinson. It originally aired on HBO on April 12, 2026 and received mostly mixed reviews. The title of this episode is a reference to Mexican Spanish interjection that usually means 'come on!'

The episode's cold open depicts former addict teenager Rue Bennett (Zendaya), five years after graduation and California sober, getting her car stuck on the Mexico–United States border wall. In the episode proper, Rue is indentured as mule to drug dealer Laurie (Martha Kelly). Meanwhile, Nate Jacobs (Jacob Elordi) has taken over his father’s construction business and is preparing to marry Cassie Howard (Sydney Sweeney), who is posting erotic online content.

== Plot ==
In Chihuahua, five years after graduating from high school, Rue Bennett (Zendaya) drives a Jeep towards the Mexico–United States border. Using a ramp to drive over the wall, Rue gets her car stuck. Failing to move the car, she abandons it, climbs down the ramp and walks through the desert with a duffel bag of fentanyl. In Texas, she spends the night with a Christian family, under the pretense that she is a traveling college student, before traveling back to California. Rue lives with drug dealer Laurie (Martha Kelly), her cousin Harley (James Landry Hébert) and his lost causer and neo-Nazi son Wayne (Toby Wallace).

Flashbacks depict Laurie tracking down Rue three years prior and informing her of a $43 million debt, increased from $10,000 suitcase Laurie fronted to Rue 46 months earlier due to interest. Rue recruits Faye Valentine (Chloe Cherry) to body pack for Laurie, smuggling drugs past border security. In the present, Rue has a side job as an Uber driver and frequently visits her childhood best friend Lexi Howard (Maude Apatow), who now works as a production assistant to Patricia Lance (Sharon Stone), showrunner of the Warner Bros. soap opera LA Nights. Her older sister, Cassie (Sydney Sweeney), is engaged to Nate Jacobs (Jacob Elordi) and pursuing fame as an erotic influencer on TikTok.

Nate is trying to sell end-of-life care facilities through his father's former real estate company. Maddy Perez (Alexa Demie) is an assistant to Ms. Penzler (Rebecca Pidgeon), talent manager of actor Dylan Reid. She tells Lexi that Jules Vaughn (Hunter Schafer) is sugar dating while attending art school. Rue, still enamored by the Texan family, has a conversation with her sponsor Ali Muhammad (Colman Domingo) in a diner about faith. Reconsidering the third step of the twelve-step program, "coming to believe in a Higher Power that can give strength", Rue starts listening to the Bible on audiobook.

Laurie sends Rue to deliver pills to the mansion of Alamo Brown (Adewale Akinnuoye-Agbaje), a successful pimp. Rue desperately wants to stop smuggling drugs for Laurie so she begs Alamo for a job. Cassie guilt-trips Nate into letting her start an OnlyFans to pay for her desired $50,000 wedding flowers. One of Alamo's strippers, Tish, has a fatal overdose from a fentanyl-laced pill. Questioned by Alamo, Rue explains she is indebted to Laurie for mistakes she made as a teenager and believes in God. Alamo shoots an apple off Rue's head to test her faith. Rue miraculously survives, drops to her knees and kisses the ground.

== Production ==
=== Writing ===
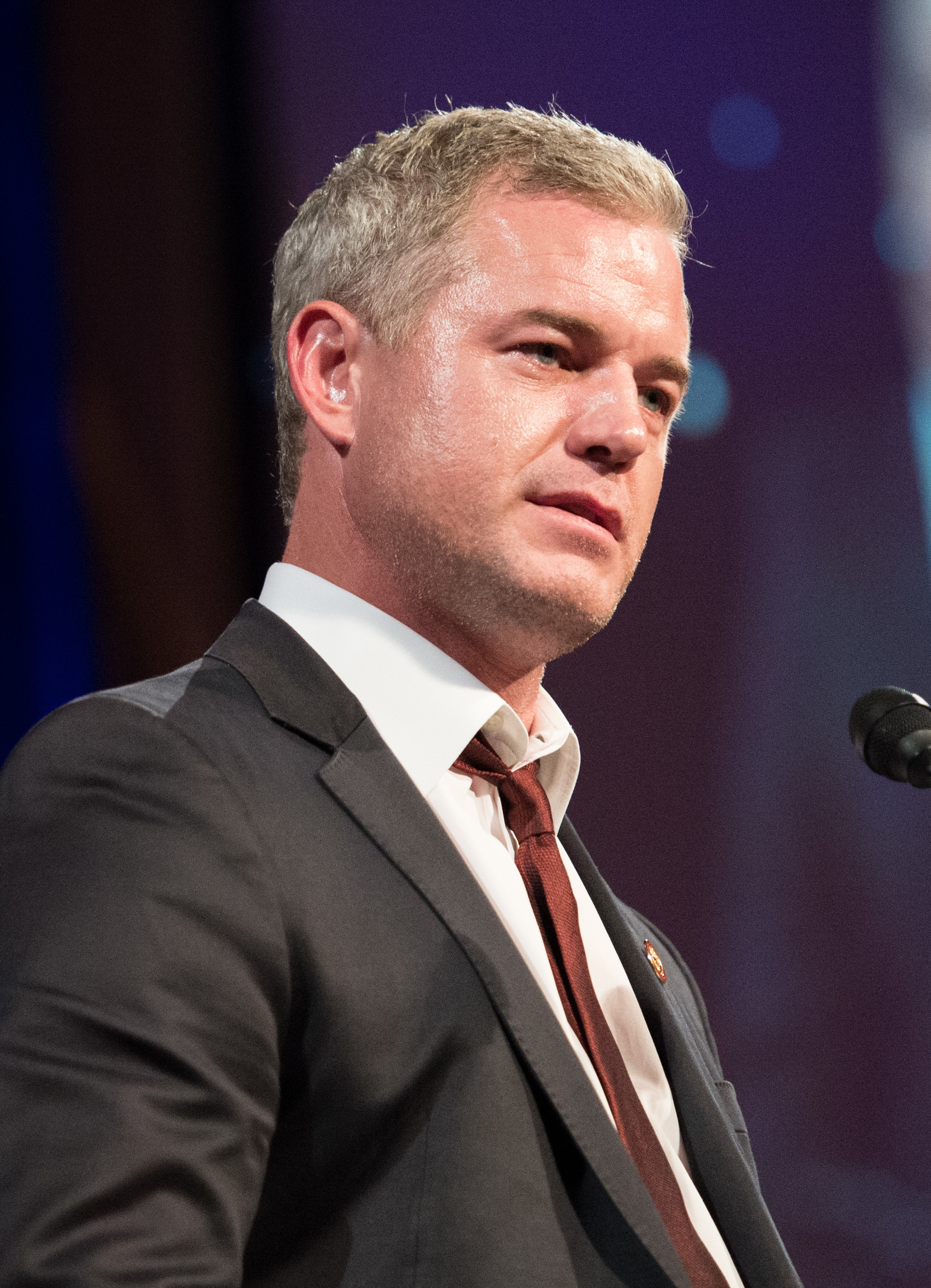
"Ándale" was dedicated to Eric Dane (pictured), Angus Cloud, and Kevin Turen.

'Ándale', an interjection used in Guatemalan and Mexican Spanish which affirms, indicates agreement, or consent and means something like 'come on!', 'hurry up!', or 'let's go!' in English is the origin of the episode's title. This name was chosen due to the opening scene, where six Mexican men help Rue get her car out of some mud. The premiere features in memoriam tributes to Angus Cloud, Kevin Turen, and Eric Dane. Cloud who played Fezco O'Neill in seasons 1 and 2, died of an overdose in 2023. Executive producer Turen died from a heart failure while driving in 2023. Dane who played Cal Jacobs died from ALS in 2026. This is the first episode of Euphoria where Jules does not appear.

Series creator, writer and director Sam Levinson spoke to The Hollywood Reporter's "Directors in Focus" about the writing process for the opening scene on the border wall: "Originally, you know, I thought, well, maybe it'll be fun to have her, like, you know, crossing some river and, you know, there's horses that are chasing her and so, I, you know, written that into the script. [...] We went, we met with the, you know, the Drug Enforcement Administration in Los Angeles and we went to their headquarters. And I'm walking around there, um their offices and, you know they have like these photos of different busts, you know, that they've done. [...] I came across this one photo of a Jeep on top of the border wall. And I said, 'Well what, what happened here?' [...] And they said, you know, 'Some fucking idiot tried to drive a car over the Mexican border into America and it got stuck.' You know, and they're all laughing. And I just thought, 'That feels like the kind of dumb thing Rue would do.'"

Levinson also told the magazine in a separate interview about the approach behind Cassie's OnlyFans in the premiere: "she has got her dog house and her little dog ears and the nose, and that has its own humor, but what makes the scene is the fact that her housekeeper is the one filming it, what we wanted to always find is the other layer of absurdity that we’re able to tie into it so that we’re not too inside of her fantasy or illusion — the gag is to jump out, to break the wall."

=== Filming ===
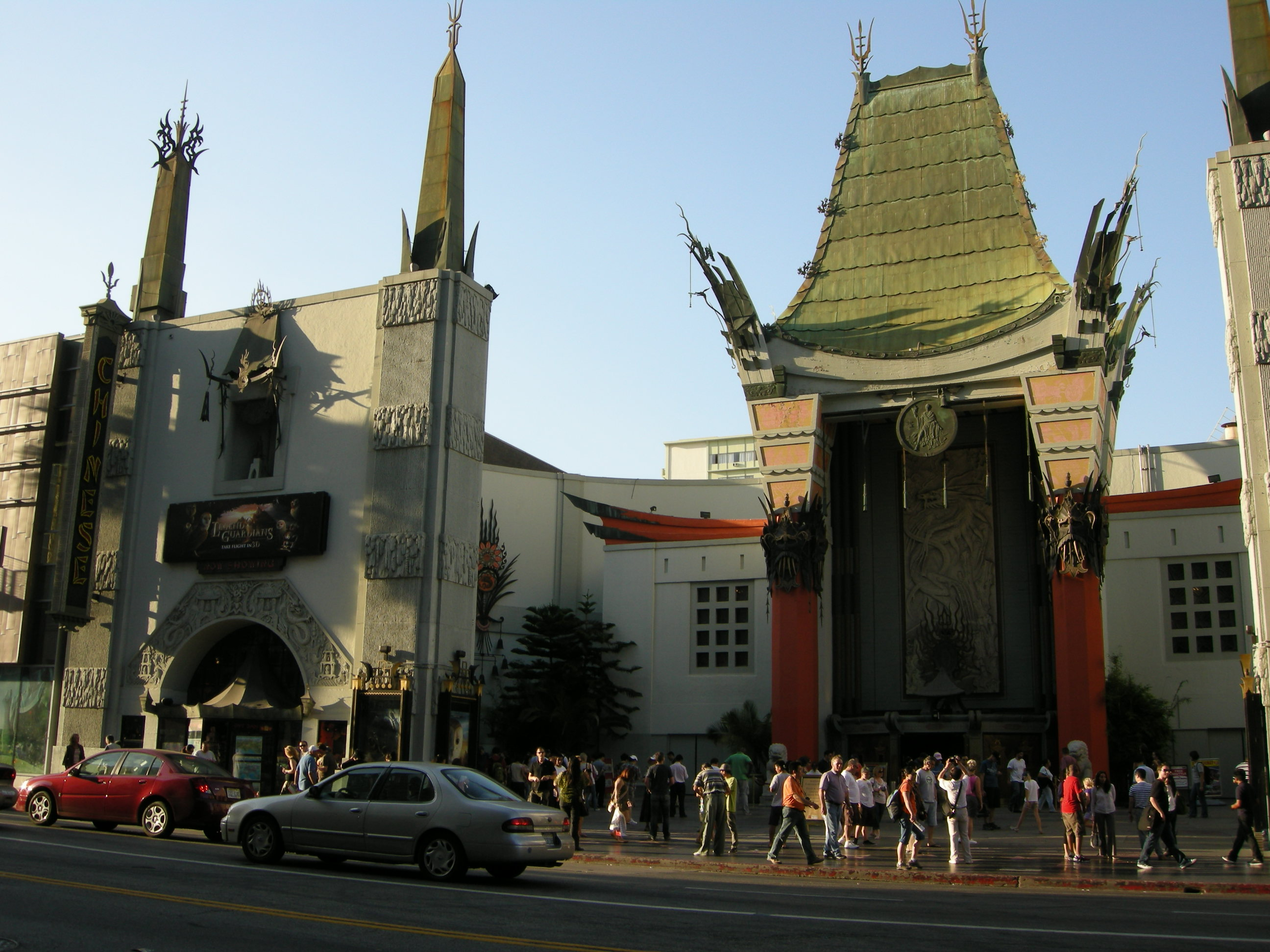
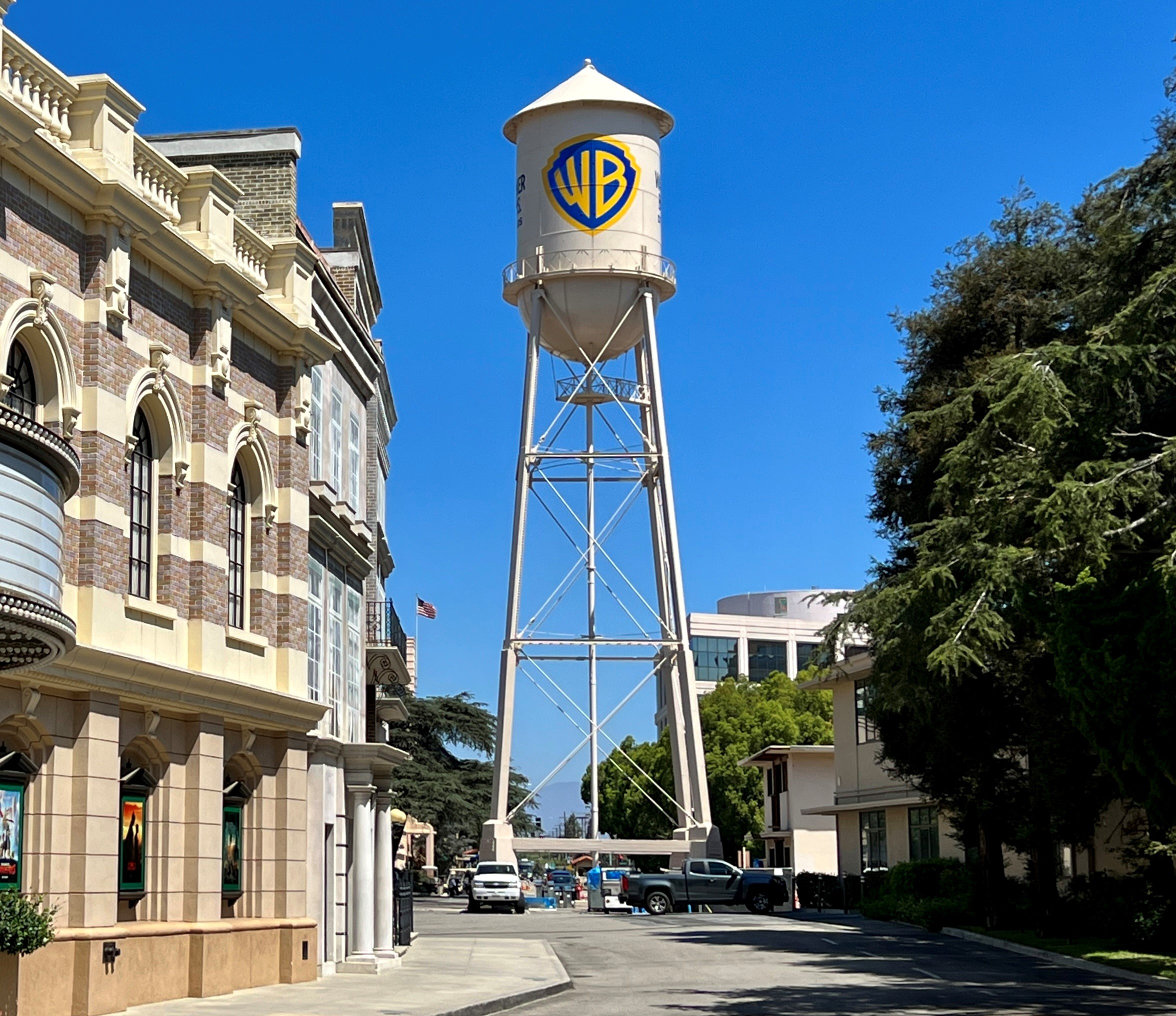
Grauman's Chinese Theatre and Warner Bros. Studios Burbank were used as a filming locations for the episode.

Location shooting the Christian family's home took place at a twenty acre horse community in Lancaster, California. Filming for Laurie tracking Rue down at her job took place at The Smoke Shack on Victory Boulevard in Van Nuys. Rue works as an Uber driver on the Hollywood Walk of Fame. Eli Roth's cameo appearance as a Batman cosplayer was filmed in front of Grauman's Chinese Theatre. Lexi lives at Valli Tropics Apartments in North Hollywood, Los Angeles, and works at Warner Bros. Studios Burbank. A luxury estate in Lakewood, California stands in for Cassie and Nate’s house. The premiere for Dylan's fictional film If I may, if I might was filmed at SJR Theatre in Burbank, California. Alamo's mansion was filmed at a building overlooking Lake Palmdale, described as a "modernist marvel" by KTLA.

For first scene, François Audouy (production designer for season 3) built a twenty-five-foot-long wall. Visual effects supervisor Mark R. Byers designed a hydraulic system to get the car up onto the wall and tilt it forward and backwards. Cinematographer of the episode Marcell Rév said the weather was a challenge to shooting: "We’re out in the desert, and the sun is moving. [...] You’re fighting the elements to get there, but you always want to be in the right angle and get the right shots and get the right movements." Levinson told Variety that the sequence "highlights the humor of this season and the tension of it, and they’re working in tandem. It becomes this bigger metaphor for her journey, where she’s just teetering. One false move, and she’s, you know, and she’s, she’s going over the edge."

=== Music ===
Rue's plays "Ride Like the Wind" by Christopher Cross on her car's radio as she drives to the border, she also sings along to the song. "Love Is Like Oxygen" by The Sweet plays while Daisy drives Rue to the bus stop. "(How Much Is) That Doggie In The Window" by Patti Page scores Cassie's erotic dog costume TikTok. "Little Green Apples" by The Temptations plays over the closing credits.

== Reception ==
=== Ratings ===
On April 2, 2026, the premiere screened at Coachella 2026, where Zendaya surprise joined Labrinth to perform Euphoria songs "I'm Tired" and "All for Us". According to Nielsen Media Research, upon airing "Ándale" was watched by 356,000 people. They estimated that 0.11% of the total 18-49 population in the US was tuning in. Including stats from HBO's streaming service Max, the episode drew 8,500,000 viewers in its first three days of release. Ten days after release, the premiere surpassed 20 million viewers globally. The episode was also the series' first appearance on the Nielsen streaming charts, drawing 556 million minutes watched in one week and placing eighth in acquired series (Nielsen lists shows which air on cable as "acquired" by streaming, if Euphoria were classified as original "Ándale" would rank fourth).

=== Critical reviews ===
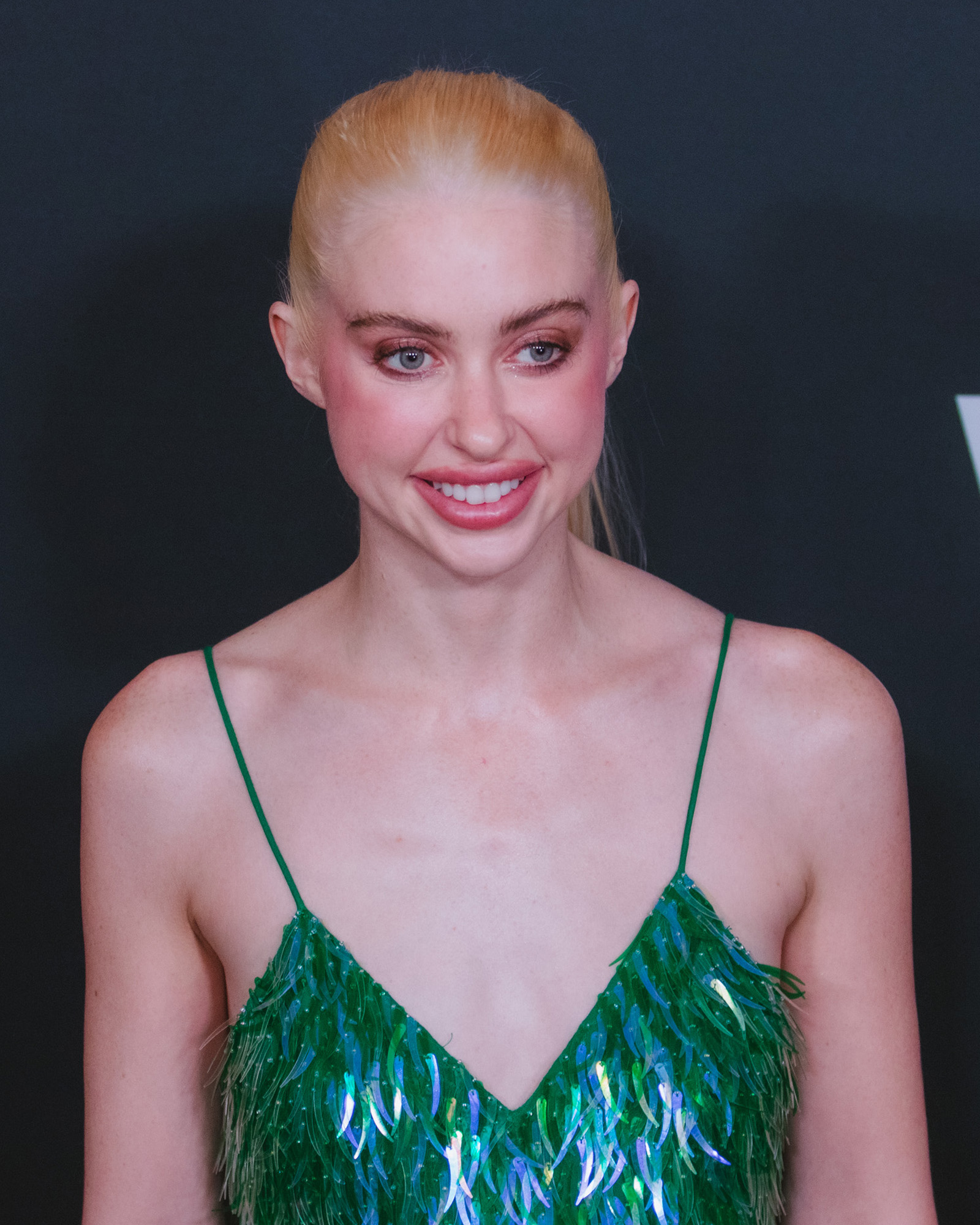
Chloe Cherry joined the main cast in "Ándale". Her scene involving swallowing fentanyl balloons was criticised.

The review aggregator website Metacritic, which uses a weighted average, assigned a score of 61 out of 100, based on seven user ratings. In a ranking of the first two seasons and specials, which included this episode, IndieWire concluded it was the worst of the series, writing that the episode "Four years, multiple movie breakouts for its cast, and the collapse of The Idol later, Levinson’s smash hit has been reborn as an abysmal Coen Brother pastiche. "Ándale" kicks off Euphoria season 3 with disastrous whiplash, dropping everything recognizable about the show: the high school setting, familiar characters like Kat and Jules, and even the woozy ‘90s sleaze aesthetics. All that changes in favor of a woeful metamorphosis that feels like a kiddie version of almost any other HBO crime drama, despite a handful of impressive beats. [Rue] feels fully disconnected from the yearning teen lesbian fans once knew. Then again, none of where Levinson takes these formerly beloved characters in their adult lives tracks as natural extensions of where they were in 2022. Just look at Cassie (Sweeney) and her miserable existence as a shackled wife-to-be for Nate (Elordi), as she finds her life’s only meaning by filming doggie fetish content for TikTok. It’s a mean-spirited, sneering sequence that represents the show at its lowest, and after waiting this long for Euphoria to return, "Ándale" confirms Levinson probably should have called it quits in season 2." In a B review for The A.V. Club, Emma Fraser wrote that "it is hard to stifle an eye roll at times. But as with previous seasons, there is much magic to be found amid the extremes as we enter a new chapter of Rue Bennett’s life as she sincerely attempts to figure out what she wants while trying to extricate herself from a mess with origins in her adolescence."

Lauren Sarner of the New York Post described the episode negatively as "Breaking Bad meets Looney Tunes." Forbes' Paul Tassi wrote that "Euphoria returned for its third season after an implausibly long four-year break last night, which made it seem like the cast would never reassemble, especially given how many of its actors’ careers had skyrocketed in the interim. But creator Sam Levinson rounded them up for one last season that starts out... quite poorly." He added that "[taking] place years after season 2, mainly so these 27 to 35(!) year-old actors are no longer attempting to play high-schoolers. It’s split them up decisively, more or less, and one didn’t show up at all yet, Hunter Schaefer’s Jules. What followed was a premiere that blended about three different shows, where none of them felt like Euphoria, and neither did the final package."

One scene depicting Rue and Faye choking down fentanyl-filled balloons covered in petroleum jelly was criticized by both critics and supporters, with Deadline Hollywood calling it "an incendiary scene that’s sure to spread like wildfire across the internet". Hans Zimmer's score was criticized. During the broadcast of the episode, composer for the first two seasons Labrinth dropped a song called "Shut Your Damn 95.7892", interpreted by critics as a scrapped song from the soundtrack.
