= Anna Van Patten =

American actor (born 1998)

- Born: November 30, 1998 (age 27); New York City, US
- Occupation: Actor
- Father: Tim Van Patten
- Relatives: Grace Van Patten (sister); Dick Van Patten (uncle); Joyce Van Patten (aunt); Vincent Van Patten (cousin)

Anna Van Patten (born 1998) is an American actress most known for her role as Kitty, a supporting character in the American television show Euphoria. She also appeared as Deanna Knox in The Twisted Tale of Amanda Knox, opposite her sister Grace Van Patten as Amanda, and as Grace Byron on Gossip Girl.

== Biography ==
Anna Van Patten was born in 1998. She was born and raised in Tribeca, New York City, and attended Fiorello H. LaGuardia High School. Her father, Tim Van Patten, took her to sets from a young age and she soon became interested in acting: according to her, at age 10, she tried to convince her father to select her as the dead girl in the Game of Thrones pilot, but at the last minute he decided it might be too disturbing. She studied film at The New School, after considering architecture as a career choice.

== Career ==
Van Patten first started gaining attention as an actor portraying senator's daughter Grace Byron on Gossip Girl, a job she found exciting due to being a fan of the original series. She went on to play Deanna Knox in The Twisted Tale of Amanda Knox, alongside her real-life sister Grace Van Patten, who was playing Deanna's older sister and the lead character, Amanda Knox. She also appeared in Master and made guest appearances in FBI: Most Wanted and Law & Order: Special Victims Unit. She appeared in a Lafayette 148 fashion campaign opposite her mother, Wendy.

Her breakout role was that of Kitty, a strip club employee and recurring character in television series Euphoria's third season. Van Patten first appeared in an episode called "Kitty Likes to Dance", named after a scene with her character. She became the most-searched new character in Euphoria. She learned pole dancing for the part, and also interviewed strip club employees in Budapest despite a language barrier. She stated that part of the reason she was interested in getting involved was that she had auditioned but not been cast for a character in the first season. She also discussed the physical challenges of the role, including in the finale, where she had to wear a prosthetic cast for ten days to imitate her character's Brazilian butt lift.

== Filmography ==
=== Film ===
Year	Title	Role	Notes
2018	That's Harassment	Model	Short film
2018	Bussed		Short film
2019	The Wisdom Tooth	Braided Girl	
2022	Master	Libby	

=== Television ===
Year	Title	Role	Notes
2019	Law & Order: Special Victims Unit	Emilia	Episode: "Exchange"
2020	FBI: Most Wanted	Cara Jarvis	Episode: "Prophet"
2021–2022	Gossip Girl	Grace Byron	Recurring role; 4 episodes
2025	The Twisted Tale of Amanda Knox	Deanna Knox	Recurring role; 7 episodes
2026	Euphoria	Kitty	Recurring role; 5 episodes (season 3)

=== Music Video ===
Year	Title	Artist(s)	Director
2025	She Don't Need to Know	The Kid Laroi	Danica Arias Kleinknecht
