= Cassie Howard =

Fictional character from Euphoria

- Euphoria character
- First appearance: "Pilot"; Euphoria; June 16, 2019
- Last appearance: "In God We Trust"; May 31, 2026
- Created by: Sam Levinson
- Portrayed by: Sydney Sweeney; Kyra Adler (flashbacks)

In-universe information
- Full name: Cassie Howard
- Family: Lexi Howard (sister); Suze Howard (mother); Gus Howard (father)
- Significant other: Nate Jacobs (husband)
- Nationality: American

Cassie Howard is a fictional character in the HBO television series Euphoria (2019–2026). Her usual portrayer, Sydney Sweeney, was nominated for several awards for her performance as the character in 2022, though the character's series three OnlyFans storyline was severely criticized by multiple outlets and by multiple sex workers.

== Storyline ==
=== Series one and two ===
Prior to series one, and in events broadcast as a flashback in episode seven, Howard is depicted taking ice skating lessons and listening to her parents fight. Her father Gus left the family just before Cassie started ninth grade and later became a drug addict after crashing his car; his final visit to Cassie ended with him stealing silver to fund his heroin addiction. By the time of episode one, Cassie had had multiple boyfriends, all of whom she had fallen in love with, and most of whom had coerced her into creating sexual film and photographs. She has sex with her boyfriend Chris McKay (Algee Smith) in the first episode, though she interrupts the encounter after McKay chokes her without consent, having been given the mistaken impression that she enjoyed it because of a sex tape of her he had watched. She then has to put up with him telling her that she is too sexual in episode two and with him enduring a hazing in episode three. After they visit a carnival in episode four and he tells her he is not interested in her due to her past, she takes MDMA with Daniel (Keean Johnson), mounts a carousel horse with him, and simulates cowgirl sex and loud orgasms in front of a shocked crowd. She gets back together with a groveling McKay in the next episode.

In episode six, they have sex in a dorm room, but are interrupted by a hazing ritual, after which McKay has very rough sex with Howard and Daniel reduces her to tears after she makes out with him but declines sex. After discovering she is pregnant by McKay, she tells McKay about the pregnancy in episode seven and aborts it in episode eight. In the first episode of series two, Howard accepts a ride to a new year's party from Nate Jacobs (Jacob Elordi), the ex-boyfriend of her best friend Maddy (Alexa Demie), and is sufficiently aroused by his drink-driving to have sex with him in the bathroom; she then cries uncontrollably. She then hides in the bathroom from Lexi behind a shower curtain, only for Lexi to run out of toilet paper, resort to a hand towel, and throw it in to the bathtub, where it lands on Cassie's face. Cassie then leaves the bathroom to dance with Travis (Demetrius Flenory Jr.).

Nate repeatedly blackmails Cassie and attempts to break up with her at an isolated construction site in episode two, and Lexi then writes a play partially about her relationship with Cassie, who starts waking up at 4 AM in order spend three hours changing her appearance for Nate. He gets back together with Maddy at her birthday party in episode four, causing Cassie to drink so much that she vomits. She takes part in an intervention for Rue (Zendaya) in episode five, only for Rue to reveal Cassie's affair with Nate and escape while the people involved are arguing. An apoplectic Cassie makes many attempts to call Nate in episode six and eventually moves in with him, only for him to kick her out in the next episode after an argument caused by the premiere of Lexi's play. In episode eight, Cassie interrupts the play's premiere to confront Lexi and is booed by the audience and slapped by Maddy.

=== Series three ===
By the time of series three, Howard had married Nate, moved into a McMansion with him, and got engaged to him. In the first episode, she opens an OnlyFans account, It's Just Me Cassie, with the intention of raising $50,000 for wedding flowers. Among the content she uploads to her account is pup play footage filmed by her housekeeper, Juana (Minerva Garcia). In episode two, she hires Maddy as her OnlyFans manager, publishes a baseball-themed set of nudes and footage of ice cream dripping down her breasts and of paraphilic infantilism, and deletes her account after it becomes a topic of conversation at a party Nate held to raise funds for his failing business. The pair marry in the next episode, only for Cassie to find out Nate owes Naz (Jack Topalian) $600,000 just before their first dance and for Naz to assault Nate and give Cassie a bloody nose back at their house.

In episode four, Cassie leaves Nate, moves into Lexi's apartment complex, resumes her OnlyFans career, and snorts cocaine off Brandon Fontaine (Jeff Wahlberg)'s belly button. She then uploads to her account jerk off instruction content, footage of herself dressed like a pig and of her sucking her toes, ASMRotica, and small penis humiliation. Following a macrophilic fantasy sequence in which a giant Howard walks through and destroys Los Angeles before pushing her breasts through the windows of a skyscraper containing a man masturbating to her videos, she mails dirty underwear for $50, delegates a $700 farting-in-a-jar commission to Maddy, and spouts misogyny and ableism on podcasts including a fictionalized version of Trisha Paytas's show. Much of her money during this period is wired to Nate to pay off his debts. She briefly drops Maddy after Nate swings a gig with a large influencer company, but reverses course after Maddy tells her she secured an audition for L.A. Nights, which she then organizes via Lexi. After performing a scene from Antony and Cleopatra, she gets the job as "Job Applicant", and is offered a larger role in exchange for deleting her OnlyFans account after the production's showrunner mistakes an episode six post-traumatic breakdown for improv. She then receives Nate's severed ring finger in the post.

In episode seven, Cassie loses her L.A. Nights job to production noping out of explaining her OnlyFans account and then her husband to a rattlesnake after his loansharks bury him in a grave with a small vent and kidnap her until she coughs up the $1,000,000 he owes. She follows the former by having sex with L.A. Nights actor Dylan Reed (Homer Gere) and stealing his phone to boast about the quality of her sex on his Instagram account, regaining her OnlyFans followers. After being rescued by Maddy and inventing a cover story that Nate randomly left, they spend part of the final episode discussing their next moves at a diner, before returning to Cassie's and comforting Lexi over her relationship with Rue, who had died earlier that episode. Lexi declines Cassie's offer to manage a content house to pay off her debts.

== Background and development ==
The American TV series Euphoria aired between 16 June 2019 and 31 May 2026 on HBO and was based on the Israeli series of the same name. Howard was played by Sydney Sweeney, whose involvement had been announced in June 2018, and by Kyra Adler during flashback scenes in series one. Cassie was the sister of Lexi Howard (Maude Apatow), childhood friend of Rue Bennett (Zendaya), future wife of Nate Jacobs (Jacob Elordi), and daughter of Suze Howard (Alanna Ubach) and Gus Howard (Nick Blood). and Sweeney had been appearing on TV for ten years by June 2019, having first appeared on screen playing "Little Girl" in an episode of NBC's Heroes, and having also appeared in Criminal Minds, 90210, The Middle, Grey's Anatomy, Pretty Little Liars, Everything Sucks!, The Handmaid's Tale, and Sharp Objects.

In a 2022 interview with The Independent, Sweeney said that she had asked for multiple scenes to be amended to not require Howard to be depicted topless, though she had previously filmed such scenes in series one. Prior to filming series three, Sweeney called the show's creator Sam Levinson and asked that he made sure Cassie went "crazy". The then-upcoming third series was promoted on The Tonight Show Starring Jimmy Fallon in June 2025 by Sweeney and at the HBO Max presentation in London in December by Levinson, who revealed Howard's wedding. Unused footage saw Howard pole dancing, for which Sweeney took lessons. Howard's giantess scenes were inspired by Attack of the 50 Foot Woman, Mothra, and what IndieWire described as "other sci-fi films that relied on miniatures and old-school practical effects to achieve their sense of spectacle".

== Reception ==
For her role as Howard, Sweeney was nominated for Best Supporting TV Performance at the Dorian Awards, the Best Supporting Actress in a Broadcast Network or Cable Series, Drama at the Hollywood Critics Association TV Awards, The Drama TV Star of 2022 award at the People's Choice Awards, the Outstanding Supporting Actress in a Drama Series award at the Primetime Emmy Awards, and the Best Performance in a Show at the MTV Movie & TV Awards. At the last of these, the show also won Best Fight for Cassie's fight with Maddy at the end of series two.

Following the release of the series three premiere, a teaser clip at the end of the program in which Howard wore curly pigtails and posed with her legs open and a pacifier in her mouth—content that would be banned by OnlyFans' guidelines—was widely criticized by fans and by Megyn Kelly on The Megyn Kelly Show. Multiple outlets ran pieces from viewers perturbed by Howard's OnlyFans outfits including the Metro and The Cut. Sex workers preferred the portrayal of OnlyFans by Margo's Got Money Troubles, a show that ran around the same time as Euphoria's third series, with Sydney Leathers describing much of Howard's storyline as "ridiculous and cartoonish", Maitland Ward accusing it of "perpetuat[ing] stereotypes that sex workers have no moral compass", Sophie Rain describing the extreme outfits worn by Howard as "damaging" to her community, and Euphoria actress and former sex worker Chloe Cherry describing Howard's storyline as "crazy as fuck".

Howard's OnlyFans storyline was also criticized by Belen Edwards of Mashable, who described it as an "over-sexualized humiliation gauntlet"; by Lauren Sarner of the New York Post, who questioned what point it was making beyond the camera ogling Howard; by Hannah J Davies of The Guardian, who wrote that the storyline felt "bafflingly dated"; and by Eleanor Halls of The Daily Telegraph, who wrote that Howard had become "such a caricature of an airhead sex kitten" that it begged the question of whether Levinson was "trolling" Sweeney. Following criticism, Levinson claimed that Howard's nudity was Sweeney's idea and Sweeney defended her role as being part of her job description as an actor. Some fans interpreted Howard's string of podcast appearances as a nod to Sweeney's real-life controversies, though Dani Bowman of Love on the Spectrum criticized her for using one of them to describe Democrats as "retarded".
