= James Landry Hébert =

American actor (born 1984)

- Born: October 4, 1984 (age 41); Lafayette, Louisiana, U.S.
- Education: Louisiana State University
- Occupation: Actor
- Years active: 2010–present

James Landry Hébert (born October 4, 1984) is an American actor.

== Early life ==
Hébert was born in Lafayette, Louisiana, on October 4, 1984. At a young age, both of his parents had died, and he was adopted by a Chitimacha couple, Ted and Rhonda Darden.

== Career ==
In 2017, Hébert played the role of Rem in the NBC television drama series Taken for 10 episodes.

In 2020, Hébert was cast as Wade in the Paramount+ Western television miniseries 1883, which is a prequel to Yellowstone.

== Filmography ==
=== Film ===
Year	Title	Role	Notes
2010	The Expendables	Bill Parker	Uncredited
2011	Texas Killing Fields	Eugene	
2011	Super 8	Deputy Tally	
2012	Looper	Looper	
2012	Seven Psychopaths	Killer	
2013	Gangster Squad	Mitch Racine	
2014	Miss Meadows	Derek Pierson/Young Man at Weenie Stand	
2017	Ghost House	Jim	
2019	Once Upon a Time in Hollywood	Clem	
2024	Horizon: An American Saga – Chapter 1	Flagg	
2026	The Wolf and the Lamb	Deputy Jim Cooley	
TBA	Bethesda †	Leland	Post-production

=== Television ===
Year	Title	Role	Notes
2015	Agent Carter	Sasha Demidov	2 episodes
2016	Westworld	Slim Miller	3 episodes
2017	Taken	Rem	10 episodes
2017	Stranger Things	Axel	2 episodes
2021–2022	1883	Wade	10 episodes
2022	Big Sky	Ivan Mooney	Episode: "A Brief History of Crime"
2024	NCIS	Jonesy	Episode: "The Stories We Leave Behind"
2025	The Righteous Gemstones	Major McFall	Episode: "Prelude"
2026	Euphoria	Harley	7 episodes
