= Hemky Madera =

American actor

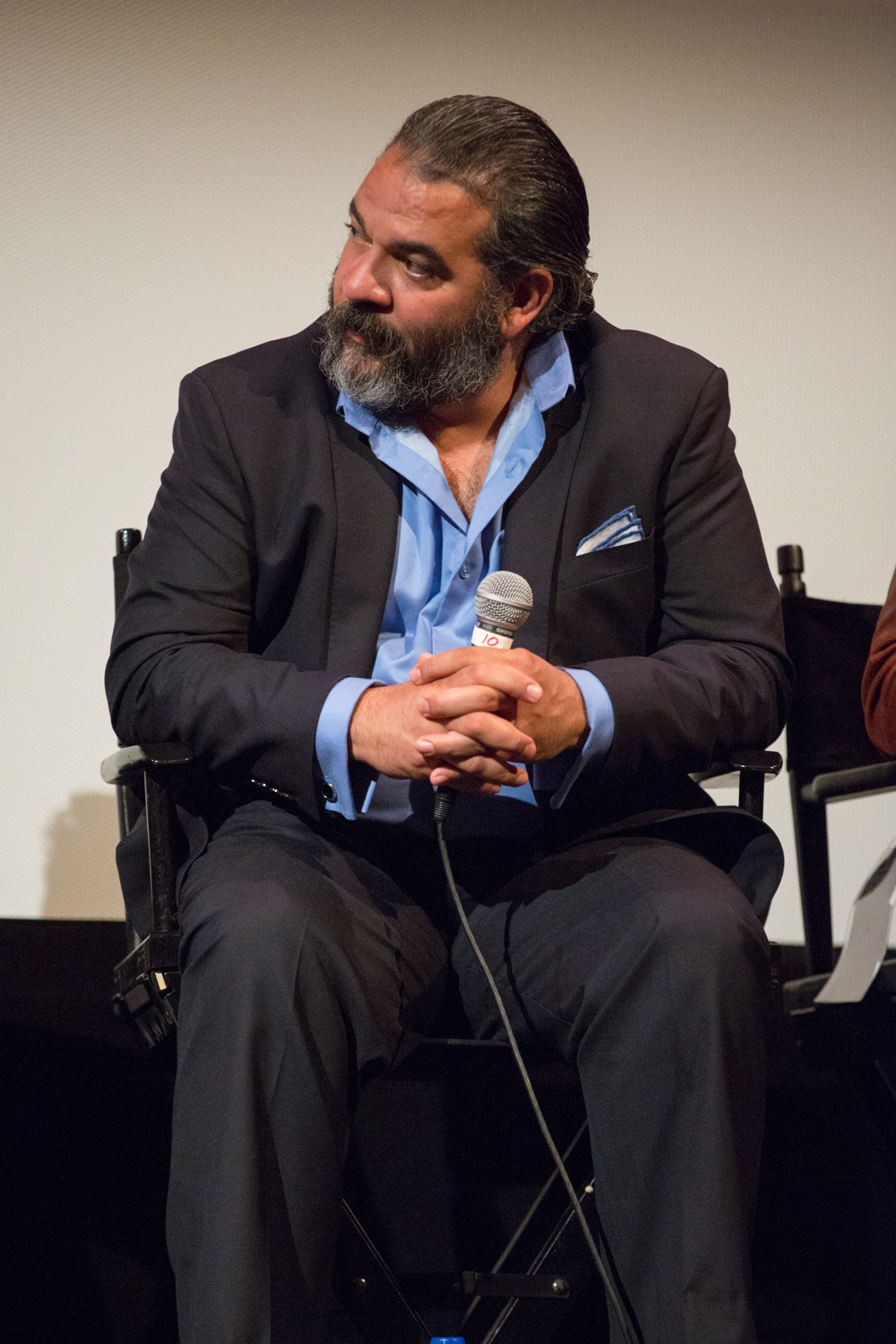
- Madera in 2016
- Born: January 26, 1977 (age 49); Queens, New York, U.S.
- Occupation: Actor
- Years active: 2000–present
- Spouse: Jesse Lynn Madera (m. 2011)
- Children: 2

Hemky Madera (born January 26, 1977) is an American actor. He began his acting career in the Dominican Republic television production Grandes Series Dominicanas in which he took the leading parts of the mini-series En La Olla and Trio en Alta Mar, both by Dominican director/producer Alfonso Rodríguez. He also played Mr. Delmar in Spider-Man: Homecoming and Carlos in Netflix original Kaleidoscope.

== Life and career ==
Madera was born in Queens, to Luis and Gisela Madera. He was born prematurely when his mother came to visit relatives in New York, and his family then moved him back to Santiago, Dominican Republic. After college, he decided to act full-time and moved to New York City where he worked on the production of The Bookie's Lament (2000) with Gabriel Macht, but later returned to the Dominican Republic, where he starred in the mini-series Asalto en la Lincoln as well as in the sitcoms Ciudad Nueva and Los Electrolocos, in which he took the lead.

After returning to the United States, he has appeared in the feature films Dreaming of Julia (2003) with Harvey Keitel and Gael García Bernal, in The Lost City (2005) with Andy García, Dustin Hoffman, and Bill Murray, in The Wrath of Cain (2010) with Ving Rhames and Robert Patrick as well as doing voice work in Rango (2011) alongside Johnny Depp amongst others.

On stage, he first appeared in Pantallas at Santo Domingo's Great National Theater. In the United States he has appeared in Inverse Theater's production of Icarus and Aria and the New York Spanish Repertoire's production of Feast of the Goat as well as assorted other stage productions, i.e. Life is a Dream, The Mistress of the Inn, Chronicles of a Death Foretold, Blood Weddings, Midnight Brainwash Revival, Burning the Bridges, and Belisa's Capriciousness.

On television, he has appeared in single episodes of hit television series Law & Order: Criminal Intent, The Shield, Brothers & Sisters, My Name Is Earl, and The Good Guys as well as 17 episodes of Weeds as Mexican drug cartel criminal Ignacio, his best-known role. He also has a recurring role as a retired baseball player on the IFC TV series Brockmire.

He starred as Pote Gálvez in the USA Network television series Queen of the South. He was originally asked to audition for the role of the father but he knew that he was too young for the part. "But I said, 'Let me just do my best, and see what happens.'” A few days later, they called him in to audition for the role of Pote.

He had a minor role in Spider-Man: Homecoming, which Madera has stated was one of his favorite roles.

== Filmography ==
Film
Year	Title	Role	Notes
2000	The Bookie's Lament	Puerto Rican	Short film
2003	Dreaming of Julia	Young Revolutionary	
2004	Cupidity	Gloria	
2005	The Lost City	Miliciano	
2007	Yuniol	Pepe	
2008	Playball	Barnabás	
2009	La Soga	Tavo	
2010	King of the Avenue	Hector	
2010	Caged Animal	Lorenzo	
2011	Rango	Chorizo (voice)	
2011	Joshua Tree	Detective Milazzo	
2011	Tamale Lesson	Martin	Short film
2011	Pimp Bullies	James	
2012	The Rooster	Hank	Short film
2012	The Last Intervention	Cheche	
2012	Prisoner 614	Prisoner	Short film
2013	Bless Me, Ultima	Chavez	
2013	In an Instant	Dr. Castillo	Short film
2013	Problem of Evil	Eli	
2013	Biodegradable	Aguasanta	
2014	Rubicon: The Beginning	Mario	Direct-to-video
2014	Supremacy	Miguel	
2014	Turtle	Mr. Madden	Short film
2014	Primero De Enero	Beto	
2014	Morir Soñando	Ricardo	
2014	Tumbleweed: A True Story	Daniel	
2014	Cut	Lopez	Short film
2015	The Preppie Connection	Raul	
2016	Sálvame	Frank	
2016	La La Land	Jimmy	Uncredited
2017	Spider-Man: Homecoming	Mr. Delmar	
2018	The Happytime Murders	Tito	
2018	En Altamar	Cantinflas	
2019	A Cloud So High	Gabriel Rivera	
2019	Spider-Man: Far From Home	Mr. Delmar	Deleted scenes at Re-released version of film / DVD
2023	Muzzle	Santiago Perez	
2025	Play Dirty	Colonel Ortiz	
2026	The Mandalorian and Grogu	Warlord Barro	

Television
Year	Title	Role	Notes
2000	Paraíso	Jose	1 episode
2000	Los Electrolocos		1 episode
2004	Law & Order: Criminal Intent	Carlos	Episode: "F.P.S."
2005	Battleground: The Art of War	Darius	Episode: "Alexander the Great"
2006	The Shield	Glen	Episode: "Trophy"
2006	Brothers & Sisters	Worker	Episode: "An Act of Will"
2008	My Name Is Earl	Carjacker	Episode: "Sweet Johnny"
2008–10	Weeds	Ignacio	Recurring
2010	The Good Guys	Osvaldo	Episode: "Small Rooms"
2011	NCIS: Los Angeles	Mexican Officer In Charge	Episode: "Greed"
2011	Caribe Road	Carlos Saldana	Recurring
2012	Luck	Uncle	Episode: "Ace and Claire Tour a Horse Farm"
2012	Burn Notice	Eddie	Episode: "Under the Gun"
2012	El Jefe	Hemky	TV Pilot
2013	The New Normal	Luis	Episode: "Finding Name-O"
2013	New Girl	Gabriel	Episode: "All In"
2015	Blue Bloods	Ted Santiago	Episode: "Sins of the Father"
2015	Beautiful & Twisted	Cristobal Veliz	TV film
2015	Bosch	F.I.D. Detective Luis Rosa	2 episodes
2015	Murder in Mexico: The Bruce Beresford-Redman Story	Raul Fuentes	TV film
2015	From Dusk till Dawn: The Series	Celestino Oculto	Episode: "Bizarre Tales"
2015	The League	Ernesto	Episode: "The Beer Mile"
2015	Agent X	Hugo Tulum	Episode: "Sacrifice"
2015–18	Ash vs Evil Dead	Brujo	4 episodes
2016–2021	Queen of the South	Pote Gálvez	Main cast
2017	Noches con Platanito		1 episode
2017	Curb Your Enthusiasm	Cesar	Episode: "Never Wait for Seconds!"
2017–2018	Brockmire	Pedro Uribe	Recurring, 10 episodes
2018	Criminal Minds	Inspector Manny Silva	Episode: "Luke"
2018	The Good Doctor	Santiago	Episode: "Hubert"
2018	Lethal Weapon	Benny Avila	Episode: "Bali"
2022	Acapulco	Older version of Memo	Recurring
2023	Kaleidoscope	Carlos Sujo	4 episodes
2023	The Mandalorian	Warlord Barro	Episode: "Chapter 23: The Spies"
2023	Lincoln Lawyer	Agent Felix Vasquez	2 episodes
2026	Euphoria	DEA Agent Jiménez	6 episodes
2026	Sheriff Country	Roberto Iglesias	1 episode

Video game roles
Year	Title	Role
2016	Uncharted 4: A Thief's End	Vargas (voice)
