= Martha Kelly =

American stand-up comedian (born 1968)

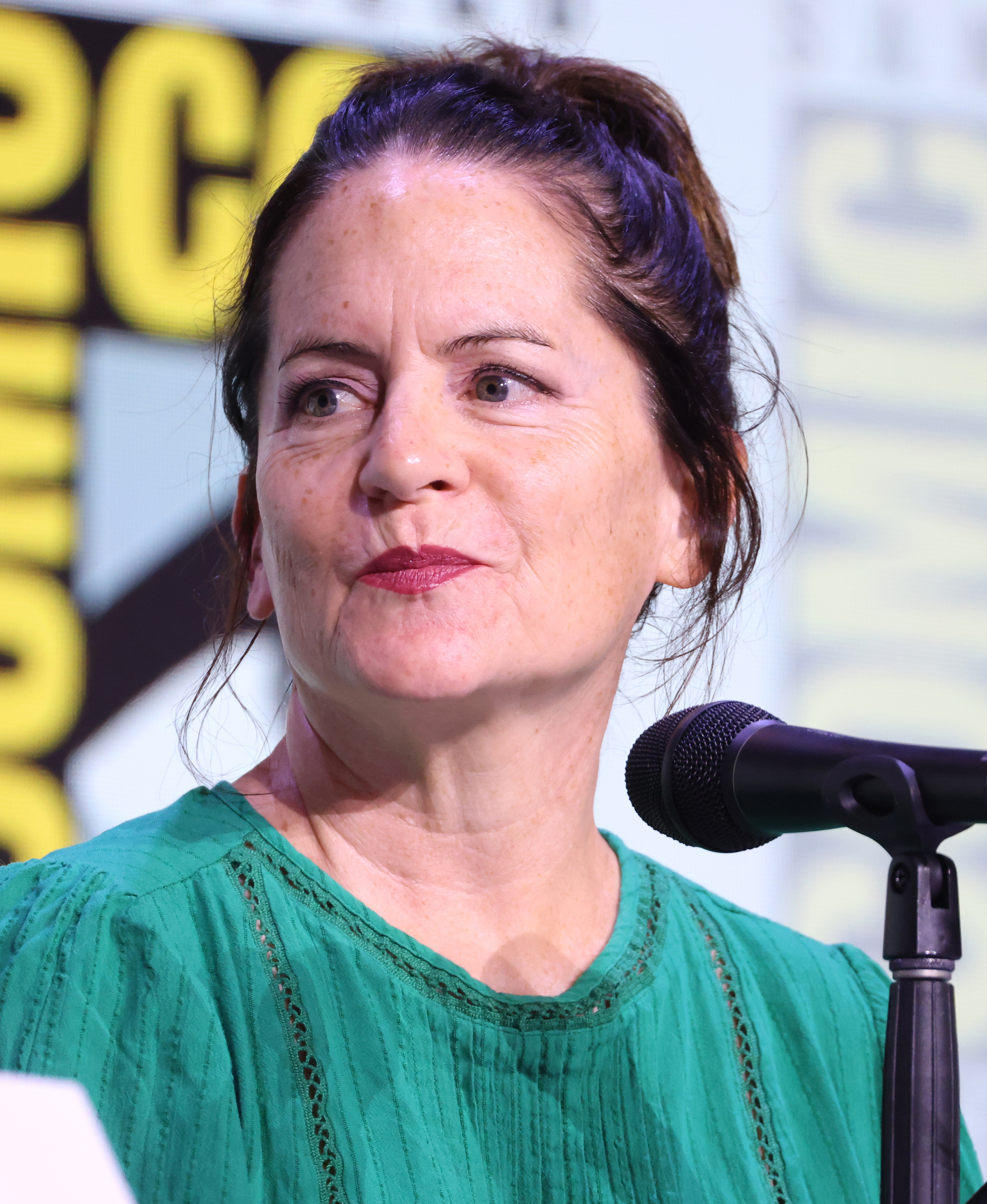
- Kelly in 2025
- Born: February 24, 1968 (age 58); Torrance, California, U.S.
- Occupations: Actress; comedian
- Years active: 1994–present

Martha Kelly (born February 24, 1968) is an American stand-up comedian and actress from Los Angeles, California, best known for co-starring in the FX comedy series Baskets (2016–2019). In 2022, Kelly was nominated for the Primetime Emmy Award for Outstanding Guest Actress in a Drama Series for her role as the drug lord Laurie on Euphoria (2022–2026).

== Career ==
=== Stand-up comedy ===
In high school Kelly identified as a "drama geek". After finishing near the bottom of her high school class, she attended junior college before attending UC Davis.

She has been featured on Late Night with Conan O'Brien, Comedy Central's The Half Hour and Premium Blend, NBC's Last Comic Standing, and The Late Late Show with Craig Ferguson.

At age 25, Kelly experimented with stand-up comedy at the Laugh Factory in her native Los Angeles. Her material and confidence slowly developed over a five-year period.

Kelly first surfaced on comedy stages in Austin, Texas, with HBO's Aspen Comedy Festival auditions at Esther's Pool, the Sixth Street venue associated with Esther's Follies, in the fall of 1999, followed by winning Capital City Comedy Club's annual "Funniest Person in Austin" contest in April 2000. Kelly was the winner of Comedy Central's 2002 Laugh Riots national comedy competition and was one of the New Faces in the Just for Laughs comedy festival that same year.

=== Acting ===
After many years of performing stand-up, Kelly made her acting debut in January 2016 after longtime friend Zach Galifianakis asked her to co-star in his FX comedy series Baskets. She co-stars as Martha, an insurance adjuster and friend of Chip Baskets (played by Galifianakis).

In 2022, Kelly was nominated for an Emmy for her guest role as a drug dealer in the HBO series Euphoria. She is the voice of Agent Harrington on the Adult Swim animated series Common Side Effects.

== Filmography ==
=== Film ===
| Year | Title | Role | Notes |
|---|---|---|---|
| 2015 | Knock Knock, It's Tig Notaro | Self | |
| 2017 | Infinity Baby | Ava | |
| 2017 | Spider-Man: Homecoming | Tour Guide | |
| 2019 | Corporate Animals | Gloria | |
| 2019 | Marriage Story | Nancy Katz | |
| 2023 | Sitting in Bars with Cake | Ruth | |
| 2025 | Poetic License | Professor Greta Ellis | |
| 2026 | Coyote vs. Acme | Dottie Jones | Filmed in 2023 |

=== Television ===
| Year | Title | Role | Notes |
|---|---|---|---|
| 2016–2019 | Baskets | Martha Brooks | 40 episodes |
| 2017, 2020 | American Gods | Zorya Utrennyaya | 2 episodes |
| 2018 | Will & Grace | Patty | Episode: "Grace's Secret" |
| 2020 | Corporate | Tandry | Episode: "Fuck You Money' |
| 2020 | Aunty Donna's Big Ol' House of Fun | Stylist | Episode: "Dinner Party" |
| 2021–2025 | The Great North | Bethany (voice) | 24 episodes |
| 2022–2026 | Euphoria | Laurie | Recurring role (season 2); main role (season 3) |
| 2022 | American Auto | Barb | Episode: "Employee Morale" |
| 2022 | Grace and Frankie | Patty | 2 episodes |
| 2022 | Hacks | Barbara | 2 episodes |
| 2022 | I Love That for You | Pam | Episode: "Daddy's Lil' Cookies" |
| 2022 | Gaslit | Rose Mary Woods | 5 episodes |
| 2023 | What We Do in the Shadows | Martha | Episode: "The Campaign" |
| 2023 | Carol & the End of the World | Carol Kohl (voice) | Main role |
| 2025–present | Common Side Effects | Agent Harrington (voice) | Main role |
| 2025 | Fallout | Representative Welch | 2 episodes |
| 2026 | Bad Thoughts | Natalie | Episode: “BAD ROMANCE” |
| 2026 | Big City Greens | Flute Hippie (voice) | Episode: "Caging Cricket" |
| 2026 | The Terrors of Jordan Mendoza | Erin | Episode: "I Gotta Relax." |
