= Alexa Demie =

American actress

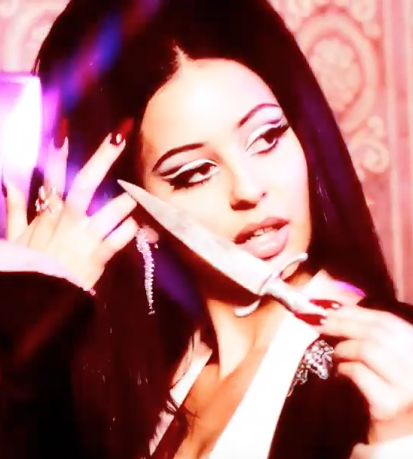
- Demie in 2019
- Born: 1990/1991 (age 35–36)
- Occupation: Actress
- Years active: 2012–present

Alexa Demie (born 1990/1991) is an American actress. Demie is best known for portraying Maddy Perez on the HBO teen drama Euphoria (2019–2026). Her film credits include Brigsby Bear (2017), Mid90s (2018), and Waves (2019).

== Early life ==
Demie was born in 1990/1991. She became involved in performing arts only in her senior year of high school.

During high school, Demie launched a sunglasses line called Mainframe that gained international attention before she discontinued it after not being paid for her designs. She had plans to become a fashion designer but decided against it after attending orientation for a New York art school.

== Career ==
=== Early work (2013–2018) ===
Demie made her first onscreen appearance in Azealia Banks' 2013 music video for "ATM Jam". In 2015, she secured the lead in The Godmother, a shelved biopic about Colombian drug lord Griselda Blanco, and found representation through the short film Miles. She went on to guest star on Ray Donovan, Love, and the second season of The OA. She made her feature film debut in the comedy-drama Brigsby Bear (2017) and gained wider attention with a supporting role in Jonah Hill's Mid90s (2018).

=== Euphoria and wider recognition (2019–present) ===
After an unsuccessful audition for Augustine Frizzell's Never Goin' Back (2018), Frizzell contacted Demie about the pilot of Euphoria. Despite planning to focus on music, Demie was drawn in by the script and auditioned. She was cast as Maddy Perez, a popular teenager in an abusive, on-again-off-again relationship with quarterback Nate Jacobs (Jacob Elordi); Demie is widely cited as one of its breakout performers.

Also in 2019, Demie starred in Waves as Alexis, a teenager impregnated by a troubled high school wrestler played by Kelvin Harrison Jr. She also appeared in Mainstream (2020) and, in 2021, collaborated with photographer Petra Collins on Fairy Tales, a collection of erotic short stories published by Rizzoli.

In 2024, she appeared in the HBO series Fantasmas, created by Julio Torres. Filming for Euphoria season 3 began in early 2025, with Demie reprising her role as Maddy. She is also set to voice a role in the upcoming animated series Fables.

== Filmography ==
Key
†	Denotes productions that have not yet been released

=== Film ===
Year	Title	Role	Notes
2015	Miles	Sara	Short film
2017	To the Moon	Virginia Dawson	Short film
2017	Brigsby Bear	Merideth	
2018	Mid90s	Estee	
2019	Waves	Alexis Lopez	
2020	Mainstream	Isabelle Roberts	
2021	Nineteen on Fire	Paisley	Short film

=== Television ===
Year	Title	Role	Notes
2016	Ray Donovan	Shairee	3 episodes
2018	Love	Marina	2 episodes
2019	The OA	Ingrid	Episode: "Treasure Island"
2019–2026	Euphoria	Maddy Perez	Main role
2023	The Idol	Maddy Perez	Uncredited cameo, episode: "Pop Tarts & Rat Tales"
2024	Fantasmas	Becca	Episode: "Valued Customer"
TBA	Fables †	TBA	Voice role

=== Music videos ===
Year	Title	Artist	Ref.
2012	"That's Why God Made the Radio"	The Beach Boys	
2013	"ATM Jam"	Azealia Banks featuring Pharrell Williams	
2021	"Love 2 U"	JMSN	
2021	"Leopard Limo (Archive LL11)"	Alexa Demie	

== Awards and nominations ==
Award	Year	Nominated work	Category	Result	Ref.
Imagen Awards	2022	Euphoria	Best Supporting Actress – Drama (Television)	Nominated	
MTV Movie & TV Awards	2022	Euphoria	Best Fight (shared with Sydney Sweeney)	Won	
