= Ruby Friedman =

American singer

- Born: United States
- Genres: Rock, alternative, jazz, country, blues
- Occupations: Singer, songwriter, producer, composer
- Instruments: Vocals, guitar, piano, ukulele, whistling
- Years active: 2009–present
- Website: rubyfriedmanorchestra.com

Ruby Friedman is an American singer, musician and composer with roots in Los Angeles, New Orleans, and New York City, who fronts the Ruby Friedman Orchestra. Known for her powerful, emotive voice, Friedman’s music is characterized by poignant intensity, rousing choruses and a wide variety of influences and styles, with some songs that emerge as lyrical portrayals of forgotten women of history.

== Early life and education ==
Friedman was born and raised in Los Angeles and studied history at UCLA.

== Ruby Friedman Orchestra ==
Friedman formed the Ruby Friedman Orchestra in Los Angeles in 2009. “The concept was, ‘What would it sound like if a band from 200 years in the future wanted to do music from the 20th century? What would that sound like?’” says Friedman. “So that’s what it sounds like: It’s an orchestra from the future, doing the past.”

== Live Shows ==
Ruby Friedman Orchestra gained a reputation for exuberant live shows in Los Angeles, playing such venues as Hotel Cafe, the Federal, the House of Blues,[35] The Troubadour,[36] The Viper Room,[37], Los Globos,[38] Echoplex,[39] and Pershing Square.

In 2011, The RFO headlined L.A.’s House of Blues and made appearances in the U.K., including a private show at Iron Maiden lead singer Bruce Dickinson’s birthday cruise on the Thames and a sold-out show at London’s Troubadour.

In late 2018, RFO played a quartet of concert appearances opening for Brian Wilson in Southern and Northern California. Friedman has opened shows for Oscar-winning actor-musician Jeff Bridges and made guest appearances with Grammy winners Scott Healy’s and Vince Giordano’s big bands and actor-pianist Jeff Goldblum’s jazz ensemble. She has twice appeared at the New Orleans Jazz & Heritage Festival.

Friedman has also provided live backup vocals for many musicians, including Donovan and Heart. She has made numerous invited guest appearances, including performances with Bernard Fowler, with Grammy Award nominee Scott Healy [40], with the Jeff Goldblum's [41] jazz ensemble, and at many events at the Sayers Club.[42] She performed an acoustic invitation-only show at the Turn Gallery in Soho,[43] accompanied by Imani Coppola,[44] Matthew Steer, Maiya Sykes, Ben Crippin Taylor, and Conor Brendan.[45] She has also headlined shows at Mississippi Studios in Portland and been a featured guest vocalist at shows by the Portland-based Low Bar Chorale, an audience-choir project headed by Ben Landsverk, RFO musical director.

== Gem ==
On November 11, 2016, Ruby Friedman Orchestra released their debut album Gem on Pulchrum. The first single, "I'm Not Your Friend,” was released in June 2016. Other tracks included “Fugue in L.A. Minor,” “Shooting Stars,” “Ten Minutes,” “Fairfax Fable,” “The Ballad of Lee Morse,” “Please,” “Cheated,” “I Don’t Want,” and “Lonely Road Symphony Rag.” “I wanted the songs to be primitive, ethereal, and nostalgic, so I used all of my influences from the ‘teens, 1920s, 1930s, and 1940s,” Friedman said. “If the album is doing its job, you’ll feel like you’re back even before the 1900s.” Gem was completed over the course of two years by the peripatetic Friedman. “The album is basically about three locations, three experiences — New York, Los Angeles, and New Orleans.” Friedman garnered rave reviews from the Los Angeles Times (“POWERHOUSE”), Hits (“full-throttle talent”), and Kevin Bronson’s Buzzbands.la website (“a thunder-and-lightning barrage of soul and nerves”). Gem was praised in Magnet by veteran critic j. poet for its “quiet songs of devastation.”

== Career ==
The Ruby Friedman Orchestra has been in studio in New Orleans, in New York City with Josh Valleau at The Glass Wall, with Peter Malick at OCL Studios in Calgary, and at his studio in Los Angeles. Final recording, production and mixing were done by Alex Elena and Topher Mohr at Beethoven Studios in Culver City. The band released their debut album, Gem on November 11, 2016. The first single from the album, "I'm Not Your Friend", was released in June 2016

In late 2019, Ruby Friedman recorded with Mitchell Froom for her upcoming release entitled Late Afternoon Highs. The single entitled "Teardrop Trailer" has been released and first premiered on KCSN by DJ Nic Harcourt on radio and buzzbands.la in online media.

The version of "You'll Never Leave Harlan Alive", was featured in the Season Five finale of Justified. Graham Yost, creator and executive producer of the series, discussed the use of the Ruby Friedman version in the show.

Her version of the song was also selected for use in the Emmy-winning Reveal documentary, The Dead Unknown, an investigative report on a 1969 cold case regarding the disappearance and murder of a young woman, in Harlan, Kentucky, in June 1969.

In late 2015, The Golden Globe Award and Emmy Award winning Amazon Studios TV show Transparent selected the arrangement featuring her vocals on the Gina Villalobos/Eric Colvin produced version of the Sly and the Family Stone hit Family Affair for use in the trailer promoting the launch of Season 2.

In 2015, Ruby Friedman performed the vocals on the song, "Hunt You Down" for the CLIO award-winning advertising campaign for the launch of the Sony PS4 game, Bloodborne. The song is a collaboration with The Hit House Music, and was written by Scott Miller and William Hunt. It was recorded by Wyn Davis in Los Angeles, and by Ruby Friedman at Word of Mouth Recording Studios in New Orleans. The Petrol Advertising campaign using the song won the Golden Trailer Award for best Video Game TV Spot. The song was released as a single in conjunction with availability of the game.

In March 2015, the EP, Song of the Demimonde was released, containing seven tracks of her most-requested cover material. "House of the Rising Sun", the last song on the EP,> was recorded at Word of Mouth Recording Studios in New Orleans with New Orleans piano player Tom McDermott, and Smashing Pumpkins violinist, Ysanne Spevack.

She has also performed with McDermott, and Ysanne Spevack, in New Orleans, Emmy Award and Grammy Award-nominated TV series Treme), In both April 2015 and 2016, she performed at Buffa's and at the Lagnaippe Stage for Jazzfest with McDermott and others.

She has been retained by the estate of 20th Century Academy Award film song composer Harry Warren to re-imagine and record some of the extensive Harry Warren catalog. The catalog consists of hundreds of songs, from Academy Award winners to unfinished works in process. Several of these recordings, "Rose Tattoo", "Ungrateful Heart", and "Welcome to the Party" are included on the Song of the Demimonde EP.

In 2014, Ruby Friedman was commissioned to perform two songs, including the title track, on a tribute album, Life, honoring the life and music of Tarka Cordell, (produced by Alex Elena). Other contributing vocalists on the album include Lily Allen, Imani Coppola, and Evan Dando.

Her original songs have been selected for promotional use on NBC and have been licensed internationally for continued use in the Got Talent franchise. Her songs or vocals have also been licensed for use by Fox Sports and numerous movie and video game trailers, recently in 2017 trailers for the film Marshall and Netflix miniseries Godless. The original song, Drowned, was also featured in Season Three of the television show Sons of Anarchy. She composed extensive original score for the 2018 World Cup special Phenoms on Fox Sports. She was commissioned to compose and perform the official theme song for author Kim Michele Richardson's New York Times bestseller The Book Woman of Troublesome Creek to be used in various advertising platforms and future media. She has recently been co-writing compositions for the upcoming Wynonna Judd album. Her original music is regularly supported by KCRW as well many other independent radio stations. In August of 2026 her song, Whistleblower was featured in the closing credits of the AppleTV's Silo (season 3, episode 9.)

Ruby Friedman Orchestra has toured with Brian Wilson and Jeff Bridges She has also provided live backup vocals for many legends as well including Donovan and Heart. When in Los Angeles, she has headlined at the House of Blues, The Troubadour, The Viper Room, Hotel Café, Los Globos, Echoplex, and Pershing Square. She has made numerous invited guest appearances, including performances with Bernard Fowler, with Grammy Award nominee Scott Healy, with the Jeff Goldblum jazz ensemble, and at many events at the Sayers Club. She performed an acoustic invitation only show, at the Turn Gallery in Soho, accompanied by Imani Coppola, Matthew Steer, Maiya Sykes, Ben Crippin Taylor, and Conor Brendan.

== Chimes After Midnight ==
"Chimes After Midnight" was Execturive Produced by Graham Yost. Ruby Friedman and Ben Landsverk began working on the album in early 2023. The album's 10 tracks are:

1. "Honeystomach (The Flight of Connie Converse)"
2. "Music Row"
3. "From the Storm"
4. "Flower Whore"
5. "When the Hangman…"
6. "Milky Way (Ode to Frank Black)"
7. "Four Day Muse"
8. "Book Woman’s Daughter"
9. "Friday Night Depression"
10. "The Mayor of North Hollywood Park"

Friedman wrote or co-wrote all the songs. Three of them are with multi-instrumentalist Ben Landsverk, who contributed on keyboards, viola, guitar, fiddle, organ, viola, violin, bowed bass, ghost piano, banjo, bass, percussion and synth. Co-writers also include Nashville-based musicians Adrienne Smith and Philip White (“Music Row”), California-based DJ/producer Kr3ature (“From the Storm”), and Nicholas Allan Johns, who is a member of Friedman’s Los Angeles band (“Four Day Muse”). Other contributing musicians include: Mark Pender (trumpet and trombone) on “Flower ”Whore and “Mayor of North Hollywood Park” The album was recorded over the course of a year in Portland, Los Angeles, New York, Rome, Athens, and Nashville. It was mixed and mastered by Steve Baughman in L.A . Other contributing musicians include: Mark Pender (trumpet and trombone) on “Flower ”Whore and “Mayor of North Hollywood Park”.

== Discography ==
Release date	Title	Label
2011	"Drowned" (Single)	Self-released
2014	"Life" (Single)	Room 609 Records
2014	"Home or Out of Range" (Single)	Room 609 Records
2014	"You'll Never Leave Harlan Alive" (Single)	Self-released
2015	"Song of the Demimonde" (EP)	Self-released
2015	"Hunt You Down" (Single)	The Hit House
2016	"I'm Not Your Friend" (Single)	Self-released
2016	Gem (Album)	Pulchrum
2016	"House of the Rising Sun (feat. Tom McDermott & Ysanne Spevack)"' (Single)	Self-released
2018	"Un4GvN" (feat. Two Beards)" (Single)	Two Beards Productions
2019	"Book Woman of Troublesome Creek" (Single)	Pulchrum
2019	"Journey On A Bullet" (feat. Gentleman Alchemists) (Single)	Pulchrum
2019	"Teardrop Trailer” (Single)	Mothership Music
2020	"Aint Got Your Money” (Single)	Ruby Friedman Orchestra
2022	"The Book Woman’s Daughter" (Single)	Ruby Friedman Orchestra
2025	"Chimes After Midnight" (Album)	Label 51 Recordings
2026	"Whistleblower" (Single)	Anonymous
