= Pack Horse Library Project =

Great Depression mobile library project in Kentucky

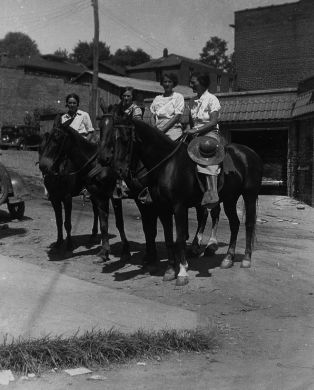
Packhorse librarians ready to start delivering books

The Pack Horse Library Project was a Works Progress Administration (WPA) program that delivered books to remote regions in the Appalachian Mountains between 1935 and 1943. Women were very involved in the project that eventually had 30 different libraries serving 100,000 people. Packhorse librarians were known by many different names, including "book women," "book ladies," and "packsaddle librarians." The project helped employ around 200 people and reached around 100,000 residents in rural Kentucky.

== Background ==
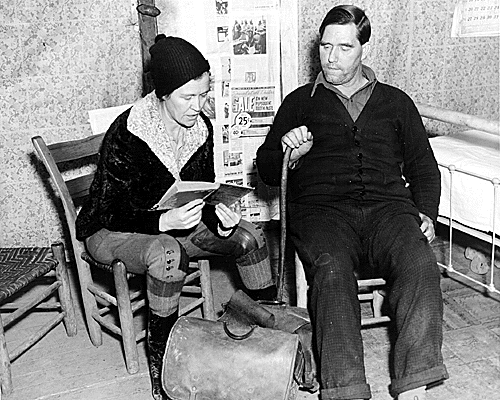
A pack horse librarian reads aloud to a man in the Kentucky mountains.

Because of the Great Depression and a lack of budget money, the American Library Association estimated in May 1936 that around a third of all Americans no longer had "reasonable" access to public library materials.

Eastern, rural Kentucky is a geographically isolated area, cut off from much of the country. Prior to the creation of the Pack Horse Library Project, many people in rural Appalachian Kentucky did not have access to books. The percentage of people who were illiterate in eastern Kentucky was at around 31 percent. People who lived in rural, mostly inaccessible areas wanted to become more literate, seeing education as a way to escape poverty. While there were traveling libraries, which were created by the Kentucky Federation of Women's Clubs starting in 1896, the lack of roads and population centers in eastern Kentucky discouraged the creation of most public library services in those locations. The traveling libraries were discontinued in 1943. In Kentucky, 63 counties had no library services at all during the early 1930s.

The first Pack Horse Library was created in Paintsville in 1913 and started by May F. Stafford. It was supported by a local coal baron, John C.C. Mayo, but when Mayo died in 1914, the program ended because of lack of funding. Elizabeth Fullerton, who worked with the women's and professional projects at the WPA, decided to reuse Stafford's idea. In 1934, A Presbyterian minister who ran a community center in Leslie County offered his library to the WPA if they would fund people to carry the books to people who could not easily access library materials. That idea started the first pack horse library that was administered by the Federal Emergency Relief Administration (FERA) until the WPA took it over in 1935. By 1936, there were eight pack horse libraries in operation.

== Description ==
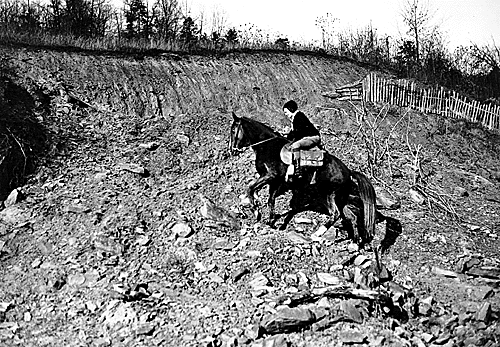
Trails could be difficult and dangerous, except where the WPA had completed its farm-to-market road program.

The Pack Horse Library Project was headed by Ellen Woodward at a federal level. The project ran between 1935 and 1943. "Book women" were hired by the WPA and worked for around $28 a month delivering books in the Appalachians via horseback or on mules. They delivered both to individual homes and to schoolhouses. The WPA paid for the salaries of the supervisors and book carriers; all books were donated to the program.

Members of the community had not only to donate books but also provide facilities to store the books and other supplies needed by the librarians on horseback. Each local pack horse library had a clerk, or head librarian, who handled various library duties, and four to ten book carriers who delivered books to mountain schools and homesteads. The head librarian would process donations at the headquarters, repair books, and get items ready to deliver. Librarians repurposed items like cheese boxes into card catalog files or license plates bent into shapes for bookends. Monthly, the librarians would meet at their central facility in what they called "conferences." Most of the people involved in the Pack Horse Library Project were women. Most of the pack horse librarians were the only person in their family who was then earning an income.

Book carriers provided their own horses or mules, some of which were leased from local farmers. Some routes were so steep that one book woman, Grace Caudill Lucas, had to lead her horse across the cliffs. Other areas had deep water and her feet sometimes "froze to the stirrups." Another librarian chose to hike her 18-mile route on foot after the death of her mule. One librarian had a very old mule and so walked with her animal part of the route instead of riding. Over the course of a month, women would ride and walk their route at least twice, each route covering 100 to 120 miles (160 to 190 km) a week, totaling an average of 4,905 miles (7,894 km). The book packs that the librarians carried could hold around 100 books.

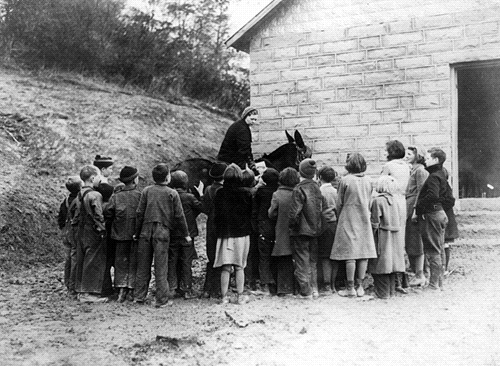
Pack Horse Librarians made regular calls at mountain schools. The little native stone school shown here was built by the WPA in Kentucky and replaced an antiquated log building.

Books were rotated between locations and were chosen based on the preferences of the library patrons. The collection of the libraries were focused on children's books. Maggie Mae Smith, a supervisor at the Whitley County Pack Horse Library, wrote that the children all ran to meet the book women, saying, "Bring me a book to read." For adults, the collection focused on current events, history, religion, and biographies. The Bible was one of the most requested books along with "instructive literature." Other popular books were Robinson Crusoe and literature by Mark Twain. Women enjoyed reading illustrated home magazines and books about health and parenting. Another unique aspect of the collection was the recipe and quilting pattern books that women created by writing down their favorites into binders that were shared throughout the area. The scrapbooks also contained cuttings from other books and magazines, and eventually, there were more than 200 different books generated by patrons and librarians. In 1938, four Tru-Vuers with 40 films were purchased to circulate through the different libraries so that people could see their first moving pictures. The books were in such demand that one young man walked 8 mi (13 km) to the closest pack horse library to get new books. In 1936, around 33,000 books were circulated to around 57,000 families. The lending period for books was usually about a week.

Parent Teacher Associations (PTA) and women's clubs in Kentucky were key to helping raise money to purchase new books. Lena Nofcier, who was involved in promoting the book donation program through the PTA, helped raise money via book drives and penny donations. In Paintsville, Kentucky, the Daughters of the American Revolution (DAR) helped pay shipping expenses for the books donated. The head of the library in Paintsville, Stafford, also solicited books by writing to the editor of The Courier-Journal. PTAs in Kentucky helped promote the Pack Horse Library Project. Local communities held book drives and open houses to support libraries.

The Pack Horse Library Project not only distributed books, but it also provided reading lessons. Librarians and book women would also read aloud to families. Librarians were also seen as educators, bringing new ideas into isolated areas. In order to do so, librarians had to deal with their community's suspicion of strangers and deal with a "hostility toward any outside influence". Librarians managed to overcome the attitude to such a degree that one family was reported as refusing to move to a new county because it lacked a packhorse library service.

The project ended in 1943 when the WPA stopped funding the program. While local communities tried to keep the libraries going, they were unable to continue without funding. It was only in the 1950s that the remote communities would have access to bookmobiles.

== Locations ==
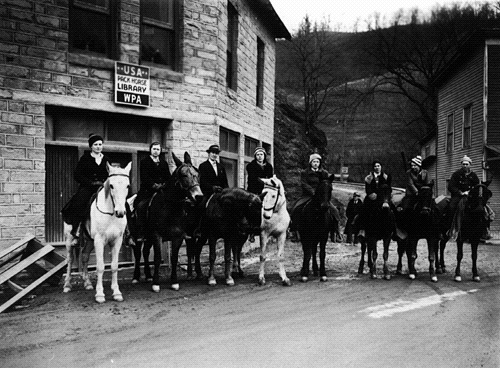
Carriers in Hindman, Kentucky.

There were around 30 different pack horse libraries who served around 100,000 different people in the mountain areas. The libraries also served around 155 schools in these counties by 1937.

Breathitt County was an early pack horse library location, opening in 1935. Campbellsville, Kentucky opened a pack horse library on November 3, 1938. The head of the project was Louise S. Van Cleve. Burkesville in Cumberland County started up a pack horse library in 1938 that had around 1,000 books and 3,000 magazines in the collection.

To obtain books for a planned Floyd County library, an open house was held in Prestonsburg in 1938. The supervisor for Floyd county was Grace Moore Burchett, who oversaw services at Prestonsburg, Martin, Lackey, and Wheelwright. Greenup County started a pack horse library in 1939. Hindman was the central location for Knott County that had a pack horse library in 1935. By 1937, there was a pack horse library in Lee County. A major headquarters was located in Lexington. Letcher County also had its own library.

London, Kentucky in Laurel County was one of the more centrally located pack horse libraries. The center was run by Ethel Perryman, who was a local director of the WPA, women's work division. London also served as a central receiving area for book donations. One large central book distribution program was run out of Pittsburgh by Mrs. Malcolm McLeod, wife of the head of the English department at Carnegie Tech, who sent her donations to London.

The first location to have a pack horse library was Johnson County, Paintsville. Leslie's collection was donated by their minister, Benton Deaton, who kickstarted the project. The pack horse library in Leslie started in the Wooton Community Center.

A pack horse library existed in Martin County by 1941. The headquarters of the pack horse library in Morehead experienced a fire in 1939. In Owsley County, they had a pack horse library by 1937. Paintsville, Kentucky revived its original pack horse library idea when the WPA funded it. May F. Stafford was in charge of the project there. The Painstville library had grown to hold around 5,000 books by 1938. It was estimated that it cost around $40 a month in rent and utilities to run the central facility for the pack horse library. The Pikeville pack horse library was run by Naomi Lemon. Pine Mountain school was the headquarters for the pack horse library in Harlan County that opened up by 1937. The supervisor of the library in Harlan County was Ann Richards, a WPA employee.

In 1936, the WPA began planning to open a pack horse library in Somerset, Kentucky. The Somerset library was supervised by Imogene Dutton. By 1937, there was a pack horse library in Whitley County. Maggie Mae Smith was the supervisor at that location.

== In literature ==
Notable books include:

- Down Cut Shin Creek by Kathi Appelt and Jeanne Cannella Schmitzer, published by HarperCollins, 2001.
- That Book Woman by Heather Henson, published by Atheneum Books for Young Readers, 2008.
- The Book Woman of Troublesome Creek by Kim Michele Richardson, published by Sourcebooks Landmark, 2019.
- The Giver of Stars by Jojo Moyes, published by Penguin Books, 2019.
- The Other Side of Certain by Amy Willoughby-Burle, published by Fireship Press, 2022.
- Images of America: Kentucky's Packhorse Librarians by Nicki Jacobsmeyer, published by Arcadia Publishing, 2025.

== In media ==
The NPR series The Keepers, "stories of activists, archivists, rogue librarians, curators, collectors and historians", devoted an episode to the Pack Horse Librarians of Eastern Kentucky. The episode originally aired on Morning Edition September 13, 2018.

A "director's cut" of the story can also be heard through the Radiotopia podcast "The Kitchen Sisters present".

== See also ==
- Biblioburro
- Warrington Perambulating Library
- Bookmobile
