= Pilot (Euphoria) =

- Euphoria episode
- Rue Bennett walks on the ceiling.
- Episode no.: Season 1 Episode 1
- Directed by: Augustine Frizzell
- Written by: Sam Levinson
- Cinematography by: Marcell Rév
- Editing by: Julio C. Perez IV
- Original air date: June 16, 2019
- Running time: 53 minutes

Guest appearances
- Alanna Ubach as Suze Howard; Lukas Gage as Tyler Clarkson; John Ales as David Vaughn

Episode chronology
← Previous —	Next → "Stuntin' Like My Daddy"
- Euphoria season 1

"Pilot" is the series premiere of the American teen drama television series Euphoria. The episode was written by series creator Sam Levinson and directed by Augustine Frizzell. It originally aired on HBO on June 16, 2019. The episode was ordered in March 2018, and filmed in June. It received mostly critical acclaim.

The television pilot's cold open introduces addict teenager Rue Bennett (Zendaya), the protagonist and unreliable narrator as she struggles with mental disorders, her father's death and a drug overdose. In the episode proper, Rue returns home from rehab with no plans to stay sober; she meets and becomes infatuated with new girl in town Jules Vaughn (Hunter Schafer). Meanwhile, Chris McKay (Algee Smith) throws a party.

== Plot ==
Rue Bennett (Zendaya) is diagnosed with obsessive–compulsive disorder, attention deficit hyperactivity disorder, generalized anxiety disorder, and bipolar disorder as a child. When Rue is a teenager, her father dies, causing her to descend into a rampant reliance on drugs and alcohol. The summer before junior year of high school, Rue has a drug overdose and is sent to rehab.

After returning home shortly before school starts, Rue immediately goes to her dealers Fezco O'Neill (Angus Cloud) and Ashtray (Javon Walton) for drugs. Popular quarterback Nate Jacobs (Jacob Elordi) catcalls Jules Vaughn (Hunter Schafer), who has recently moved to the suburbs from the city. Jules finds solace in her summer school friend Kat Hernandez (Barbie Ferreira), who invites her to a party hosted by college freshman Chris McKay (Algee Smith).

When Rue gets home late, her mother Leslie (Nika King) forbids her from leaving again until she takes a drug test. Rue immediately sneaks out to her childhood friend Lexi Howard's (Maude Apatow) home, using her urine to cheat. Before the party, Jules hooks up with an older married man (Eric Dane). Nate shows McKay a sex tape of Lexi's older sister Cassie (Sydney Sweeney), making him uncomfortable. During the party, McKay and Cassie briefly have sex, stopping when McKay suddenly chokes her: he immediately stops and they discuss it, quickly reconciling.

Elsewhere at the party, Rue talks with Fezco, who reveals his concern about Rue's continued drug use. Kat smokes cannabis with McKay's twin brothers, Roy and Troy, and their friend Wes. Struggling with her body image and fight against peer pressure, Kat lies about her sexual history and is pressured into taking her top off. Afterwards, Kat reveals to her friend BB that she had lost her virginity to Wes. Cheerleader Maddy Perez (Alexa Demie), who has recently broken up with Nate, has public sex with college student Tyler Clarkson (Lukas Gage) in the swimming pool as revenge.

After seeing Maddy and Tyler in the pool, Nate enters the kitchen and takes his frustration out on Jules, who has just arrived. When Nate threatens to hurt her, Jules scares him by grabbing a nearby knife and slashing her own arm, smearing the blood on Nate before introducing herself to the onlooking crowd, including an impressed Rue. The two introduce themselves, head to Jules' home: as the sun rises, Rue asks if they can do the 5-MeO-DiPT she got from Ashtray. After the party, Nate arrives home and walks past a family photo showing that his father is the married man Jules had sex with earlier that night.

== Production ==
=== Writing ===
On March 13, 2018, HBO ordered a television pilot for Euphoria. In an April 27, 2017, draft of the teleplay, Rue's narration was from a police interview after she murdered Nate. This idea was still incorporated into "And Salt the Earth Behind You", where Rue imagines unloading a full clip into Nate. Rue's character was originally White and more hypersexual. Jules' transness was also explicitly referred to. In the episode, Nate references The Hunger Games character with the same name as Rue and throws up a three-finger salute. Jules' actress Schafer would go on the appear in the franchise as Tigris Snow in The Hunger Games: The Ballad of Songbirds & Snakes.

=== Filming ===
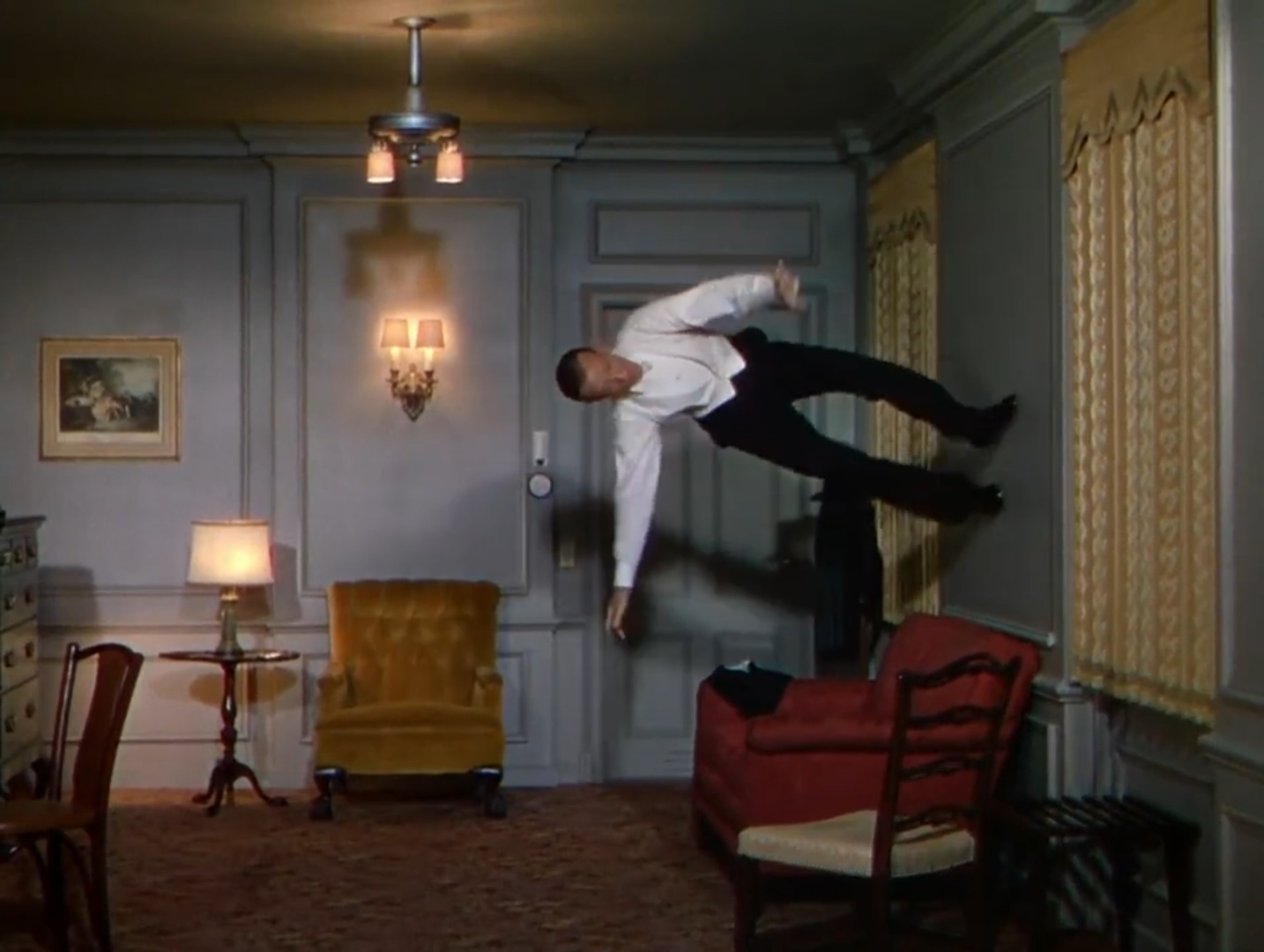
Fred Astaire dancing on the ceiling in Royal Wedding (1951) inspired the episode's rotating room scene.

Filming commenced in June 2018, with Augustine Frizzell as director. Frizzell had previously worked with Euphoria producer A24 on her film Never Goin' Back (2018). The exterior of the Bennett family house that appears in the pilot is located at 5611 Shenandoah Ave in Los Angeles. Location shooting for Milk, Fezco and Ashtray's convenience store, took place at Alta Dena Dairy in Temple City, California. The motel that Jules and Cal have sex in was filmed at Travel Inn in North Hills, Los Angeles.

A scene in the episode after Rue takes drugs features her stumbling out into a hallway, which rotates in a full 360 degree angle while she scrambles up the walls and ceiling before touching the ground again. The take was intended as the "druggy teenage equivalent" of Fred Astaire dancing on the ceiling in Royal Wedding (1951). To achieve the sequence, a mock room was built on a gimbal with every extra strapped to ground, and as the bathroom broke away, a technocrane followed Rue's actress Zendaya on a camera dolly to keep her in frame as the entire hallway rotated around her. In an behind-the-scenes video uploaded to Euphoria's YouTube channel, Zendaya spoke on the scene: "It's really disorienting, I think, being in there. Everything is just spinning, and you have no sense of where the real world is in comparison to where you are. And let's just say that like, I'm experiencing this crazy thing with Rue. [...] Going upside down as the room is moving, I did not envy those people because they must have had, like, crazy head rush."

=== Music ===
After playing "Can't Get Used to Losing You" by Andy Williams, the intro of the episode transitions into a song which sampled it, "Hold Up" by Beyoncé. The rotating room scene is set to "I Know There's Gonna Be (Good Times)" by Jamie xx, Young Thug, and Popcaan. A montage after the party plays "Run Cried the Crawling" by Agnes Obel. The closing credits start on cue with "Snowflake" by Jim Reeves.

== Reception ==
=== Ratings ===
Viewership and ratings per episode of Pilot
No.	Title	Air date	Rating/share (18–49)	Viewers (millions)	DVR (18–49)	DVR viewers (millions)	Total (18–49)	Total viewers (millions)
1	"Pilot"	June 16, 2019	0.17	0.577	0.08	0.225	0.25	0.802

Including stats from streaming service HBO Max, the episode drew 3,300,000 viewers on its first day of release.

=== Critical reviews ===
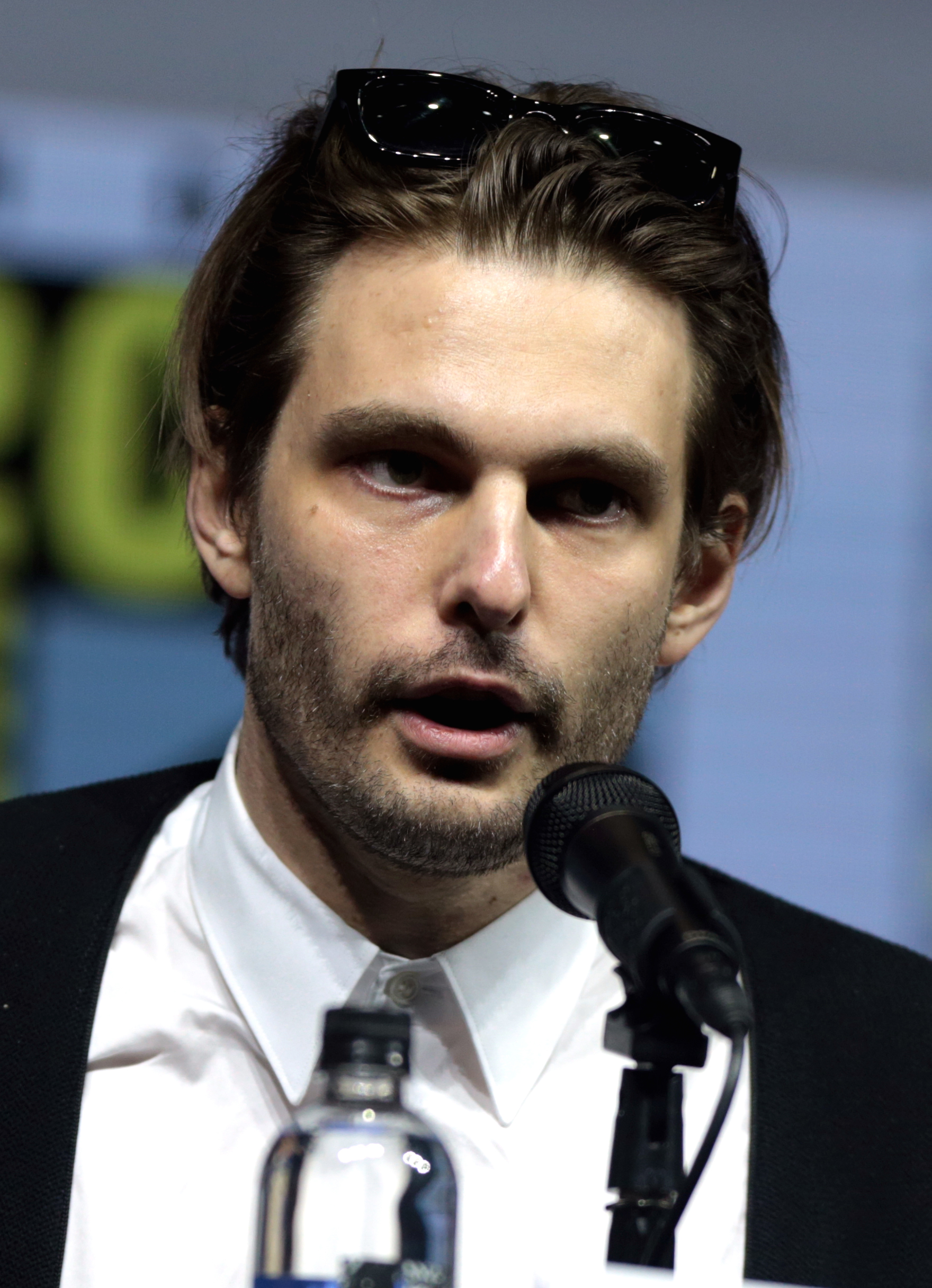
Series creator Sam Levinson wrote the television pilot.

"Pilot" received highly positive reviews from critics. The review aggregator website Metacritic, which uses a weighted average, assigned a score of 75 out of 100, based on four user ratings. TVLine gave a "Performer of the Week" honorable mention to Schafer on June 22, 2019 for her work in this episode. The site wrote "Schafer was completely magnetic, effortlessly bringing us into Jules' world of self-doubt and questionable decisions. And she did most of that without ever saying a word; Jules' inner turmoil was clear from the horror in her eyes after that motel room hook-up, or her quivering lip as Jules was taunted by truly awful rich kid Nate. And when Jules finally retaliated, eyes filled with glee as she realized she could make a bully fear her? That's when we were completely sold — and eager to see what Schafer will do next." In a ranking of the first two seasons and specials, BuzzFeed listed "Pilot" at six out of eighteen, writing: "Euphoria came out of the gate HOT, and everything there is to love about the show is front and center in the pilot. The characters arrive fully formed up to their armpits in shenanigans." IndieWire concluded it was the best of the series in a list which included season three's premiere "Ándale", writing: "Few shows could get away with an opening as on-the-nose as the Euphoria pilot, which introduces Rue via a womb-set monologue from Zendaya. Against all odds, Levinson earns his embryonic fluid by pairing his brilliantly magnetic lead with narration that cuts straight to the dissonance of Gen-Z adolescence. From the shadow left by the 9/11 attacks to that hilarious 'drinking and biking' sequence, this episode establishes the core seriocomic rhythm of East Highland."

In a three out of five star review for The Daily Telegraph, Adam White wrote that "there's a lot to like but this nihilistic teen drama feels oddly old-fashioned". Matt Miller of Esquire wrote that "After watching episode one, I'm never having children. [It] made me feel old and scared." He added that "as far as I could tell—a decade removed from being a teen myself— Euphoria accurately captures a social existence defined by texting, by dating apps, by PornHub, by dick pics, and nude selfies. And it does this while also inviting different perspectives into the conversation. Our heroine is a young woman of color. We also see the experience of a young trans woman named Jules. [...] A scene in which she's raped by an older man she met on a dating app is deeply and profoundly difficult to watch. In fact, straight white men are predominately the villains of this story— the ones who ushered in this hell world for another generation." In a four out of five star review of the premiere for The i Paper, critic Adam Sweeting deemed that the series was "destined to become a TV landmark", writing: "Being a teenager used to be fun, allegedly, but for the characters of HBO's controversial new hit Euphoria it looks more like a nightmare ride through a theme park of bad trips." He added that "Anyone expecting lightweight escapism should steer clear." And "Let's hope Euphoria is supposed to be a cautionary tale rather than a design for living."

=== Accolades ===
At the American Cinema Editors Awards 2020, Julio C. Perez IV got a nomination for Best Edited Drama Series for his work on the episode. At the 36th Artios Awards, casting directors Mary Vernieu, Jessica Kelly, Jennifer Venditti, and Bret Howe won the Casting Society's 2021 award for Television Pilot and First Season – Drama. Director of photography Marcell Rév won the 2019 Camerimage TV Pilots Competition for his cinematography in the episode.
