= Camila Morrone =

American actress (born 1997)

- Born: Camila Rebeca Morrone; June 16, 1997 (age 29); Los Angeles, California, U.S.
- Citizenship: United States; Argentina; Italy
- Occupations: Actress; model
- Years active: 2012–present
- Modeling information
- Height: 5 ft 9 in (1.75 m)
- Hair color: Light brown
- Eye color: Brown
- Agency: IMG Models (Worldwide)

Camila Rebeca Morrone (/məˈroʊn/; born June 16, 1997) is an Argentine American actress and model. She made her acting debut in the James Franco film Bukowski (2013) and appeared in Death Wish (2018), an action film, as well as the independent films Never Goin' Back (2018) and Mickey and the Bear (2019). For her role as Camila Alvarez-Dunne in the limited series Daisy Jones & the Six (2023) on Amazon Prime Video, she was nominated for a Primetime Emmy Award.

== Early life and education ==
Morrone was born in Los Angeles to Argentine actors Maximo Morrone and Lucila Polak (who goes by the stage name Lucila Solá). They moved to Los Angeles shortly before her birth, and divorced in 2006. Camila's mother dated actor Al Pacino for 10 years and Camila still considers him to be her stepfather. Camila graduated from Beverly Hills High School in Beverly Hills, California in 2015.

== Career ==
=== Modeling ===
Morrone's modeling career began in 2016, when she modeled for Victoria's Secret and appeared on the runway for Moschino. Also in 2016, she was featured on the cover of Vogue Turkey. Since then she has modeled for Sephora, Calvin Klein, Brilliant Earth, and Chanel. In July 2024, she became a NARS brand ambassador.

=== Acting ===
Morrone made her acting debut in James Franco's 2013 film Bukowski. In 2018, she returned to acting in Death Wish, and co-starred in Augustine Frizzell's directorial debut Never Goin' Back. On October 18, 2019, Morrone received the Rising Star Award at the San Diego International Film Festival in San Diego, California.

In 2023, Morrone starred in the Amazon Prime Video miniseries Daisy Jones & the Six, adapted from the best-selling novel by Taylor Jenkins Reid. The series chronicles the rise and fall of a fictional 1970s rock band, with Morrone playing Camila Alvarez, the wife of the band's lead singer. Her portrayal garnered nominations for the Critics' Choice Television Award for Best Supporting Actress in a Movie/Miniseries, and the Primetime Emmy Award for Outstanding Supporting Actress in a Limited or Anthology Series or Movie. In January 2026, she appeared in season two of the British thriller The Night Manager opposite Tom Hiddleston. Morrone acted in the role of Roxana Bolaños, a Colombian businesswoman who is involved in the illegal arms trade.

== Personal life ==
Morrone was in a relationship with actor Leonardo DiCaprio for four years until 2022. In July 2024, she and Cole Bennett began dating. She has triple citizenship with the United States, Argentina and Italy.

== Filmography ==
Key
†	Denotes films that have not yet been released

=== Film ===
Year	Title	Role	Notes
2013	Bukowski	Actress	
2018	Never Goin' Back	Jessie	
2018	Death Wish	Jordan Kersey	
2019	Mickey and the Bear	Mickey Peck	
2020	Valley Girl	Ruby Richman	
2023	Gonzo Girl	Alley Russo	
2024	Marmalade	Marmalade	
2028	Miami Vice '85 †		Filming

=== Television ===
Year	Title	Role	Notes
2016	Love Advent	Herself	1 episode
2023	Daisy Jones & the Six	Camila Alvarez-Dunne	Miniseries, main cast
2026	The Night Manager	Roxana Bolaños	Main cast (Season 2)
2026	Something Very Bad Is Going to Happen	Rachel Harkin	Miniseries, main cast
TBA	The Age of Innocence †	Countess Ellen Olenska	Post-production; miniseries, main cast

== Awards and nominations ==
Year	Nominated Work	Award	Category	Result
2019	Herself	San Diego International Film Festival	Rising Star Award	Won
2023	Daisy Jones & the Six	Celebration of Cinema and Television	Breakthrough Actress – Television	Won
2024	Daisy Jones & the Six	Hollywood Creative Alliance TV Awards	Best Supporting Actress in a Streaming Limited or Anthology Series or Movie	Nominated
2024	Daisy Jones & the Six	Critics' Choice Television Awards	Best Supporting Actress in a Movie/Miniseries	Nominated
2024	Daisy Jones & the Six	Primetime Emmy Awards	Outstanding Supporting Actress In A Limited Or Anthology Series Or Movie	Nominated
