= The Giver of Stars =

2019 novel by Jojo Moyes

- First edition
- Author: Jojo Moyes
- Cover artist: Amanda Dewey
- Language: English
- Genre: Historical fiction
- Set in: Kentucky
- Publisher: Michael Joseph
- Publication date: 2019
- Publication place: England
- Media type: Print, eBook
- Pages: 390
- ISBN: 9780399562488
- OCLC: 1227425302
- Dewey Decimal: 823.92
- LC Class: PR6113.O94

The Giver of Stars is a 2019 historical fiction novel by Jojo Moyes about packhorse librarians in a remote area of Kentucky. Set in Depression-era America, The Giver of Stars is the story of five women and their journey through the mountains of Kentucky. The women deliver library books to people in the mountains of Kentucky during the Great Depression, an actual program started in Kentucky and later funded by the New Deal. Universal Pictures has acquired the movie rights to The Giver of Stars, and the feature film is in the early stages of production.

The Giver of Stars was listed on USA Today's "top-100 books to read while stuck at home social distancing" and was a Hello Sunshine Book Club Pick by Reese Witherspoon. The book is a #1 New York Times bestseller and has sold over 1 million copies. The Giver of Stars spent 33 weeks on the New York Times best-selling list.

== Description ==
Alice Wright marries handsome American Bennett Van Cleve, hoping to escape her stifling life in England. But small-town Kentucky quickly proves equally claustrophobic, especially living alongside her overbearing father-in-law. So, when a call goes out for a team of women to deliver books as part of Eleanor Roosevelt's new traveling library, Alice signs on enthusiastically.

The leader, and soon Alice's greatest ally, is Margery, a smart-talking and self-sufficient woman. Joined by three other women they became known as the "Packhorse Librarians" of Kentucky.

== Plagiarism claims ==
Accusations were made by Kim Michele Richardson that this book plagiarized from her book, The Book Woman of Troublesome Creek. However, Sourcebooks, Richardson's own publisher, has adamantly denied her accusations against Moyes. A spokeswoman for Sourcebooks said, “We were made aware of the similarities and upon review by our legal team, it was determined that Sourcebooks would not be taking any further course of action.”

Richardson's finished manuscript was submitted to several imprints at Penguin Random House in September 2017, but the publisher claimed it could not publish the work given the very poor sales of Richardson's previous books. Richardson's accusations caused what was sometimes referred to as a "literary scandal" during the last months of 2019. Richardson acknowledged that history does not belong to any one person, and multiple people can have similar ideas. Moyes has not commented on Richardson's plagiarism accusation, but her imprint spokesperson has denied that she or the publisher had any prior knowledge of the existence of Book Woman of Troublesome Creek, its contents or of Kim Michele Richardson. Richardson chose not to engage her own counsel to pursue a legal claim in court, and instead addressed her accusations to BuzzFeed News.
