= Me Before You =

2016 film by Thea Sharrock

- Theatrical release poster
- Directed by: Thea Sharrock
- Screenplay by: Jojo Moyes
- Based on: Me Before You by Jojo Moyes
- Produced by: Karen Rosenfelt; Alison Owen
- Starring: Emilia Clarke; Sam Claflin; Janet McTeer; Charles Dance; Brendan Coyle; Matthew Lewis
- Cinematography: Remi Adefarasin
- Edited by: John Wilson
- Music by: Craig Armstrong
- Production companies: New Line Cinema; Metro-Goldwyn-Mayer Pictures; Sunswept Entertainment
- Distributed by: Warner Bros. Pictures
- Release dates: 23 May 2016 (New York City); 3 June 2016 (United Kingdom and United States)
- Running time: 110 minutes
- Countries: United Kingdom; United States
- Language: English
- Budget: $20 million
- Box office: $208.4 million

Me Before You is a 2016 romantic drama film directed by Thea Sharrock in her directorial debut and adapted by author Jojo Moyes from her 2012 novel. Principal photography took place from April to June 2015. The film stars Emilia Clarke, Sam Claflin, Janet McTeer, Charles Dance and Brendan Coyle.

The film was shot in various historic locations across the United Kingdom, including Pembroke Castle in Wales and Chenies Manor House in Buckinghamshire, England. Released on 3 June 2016 in the United Kingdom and North America, the film received mixed reviews but grossed $208.4 million worldwide.

== Plot ==
In the fictional English town of Stokebridge, Louisa "Lou" Clark is hired as a caretaker for Will Traynor, a once successful banker and active sportsman now tetraplegic after being hit by a motorcycle two years previously. Will's mother hopes Lou will lift Will's depressed and cynical spirits. Will is initially cold towards Lou. Will's ex-girlfriend Alicia visits and reveals that she is going to marry Will's former best friend Rupert. Lou perseveres with Will, and, as the two grow close, she learns he is cultured and worldly, in contrast to her simple life spent with her parents and her boyfriend Patrick.

Overhearing an argument between Will's parents, Lou learns that, in six months' time, he will travel to Dignitas in Switzerland for assisted suicide. Lou takes it upon herself to change his mind by organizing trips and adventures to show him that life is still worth living. Patrick's jealousy grows until he and Lou split up.

Will asks Lou to accompany him to Alicia's wedding. They start to fall in love. During a luxurious trip to Mauritius, Will tells Lou he still intends to die, saying he wants her to live a full life instead of "half a life" with him. Heartbroken, Lou quits as Will's caregiver and refuses contact with him.

Lou's father convinces her to visit Will, but she finds he has already left for Switzerland. She follows him there to be with him in his final moments. A few weeks after Will's death, sitting at his favourite café in Paris, Lou reads a letter he left for her. In it, he says he has left her enough money to follow her dreams and encourages her to live abundantly.

== Cast ==
- Emilia Clarke as Louisa "Lou" Clark
- Sam Claflin as William "Will" Traynor
- Janet McTeer as Camilla Traynor
- Charles Dance as Steven Traynor
- Brendan Coyle as Bernard Clark
- Stephen Peacocke as Nathan
- Matthew Lewis as Patrick
- Jenna Coleman as Katrina "Treena" Clark
- Samantha Spiro as Josie Clark
- Alan Breck as Grandad
- Vanessa Kirby as Alicia Dawares
- Joanna Lumley as Mary Rawlinson
- Ben Lloyd-Hughes as Rupert Collins
- Diane Morgan as Sharon
- Chris Wilson as Major Timothy Dawares

== Production ==
=== Development ===
On 2 April 2014, it was announced Thea Sharrock would direct the film. Before casting, Emilia Clarke knew she wanted to audition for this role, saying, "That's just kind of an interesting concoction I hadn't read before". On 2 September 2014, Clarke and Sam Claflin were cast in the film. Steve Peacocke was cast on 24 March 2015, with Jenna Coleman and Charles Dance cast on 2 April 2015. On 9 April 2015, Janet McTeer joined the cast; Brendan Coyle, Matthew Lewis, Samantha Spiro, Vanessa Kirby and Ben Lloyd-Hughes joined the cast the next day. Claflin described his role as "probably the most physically challenging thing that I've ever done".

=== Filming ===
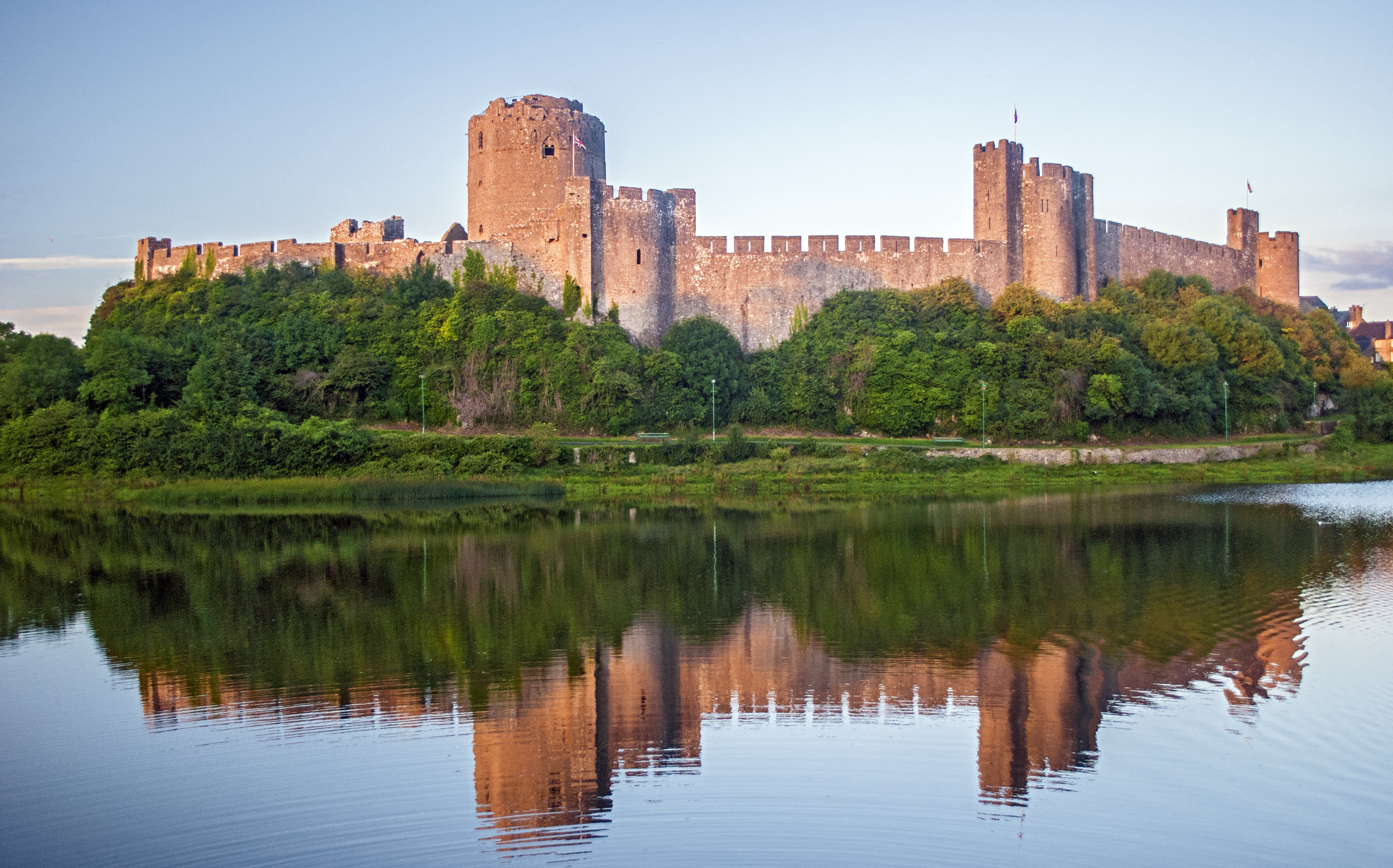
Pembroke Castle in Wales, one of the locations featured in the film

Principal photography began on 29 April 2015 and ended on 26 June 2015. The film was shot in various locations in the United Kingdom, including:

- Pembroke Castle in Pembroke, Wales (the Traynors' estate);
- Wytham Abbey in Oxfordshire, England (the Traynors' home within the castle walls);
- Sandown Park Racecourse in Esher, Surrey, England (horse race and airport check-in scenes);
- Harrow, London (Lou's family home) and Chenies Manor House in Chenies, Buckinghamshire, England (wedding scenes); and
- Mallorca, Spain, which stands in for Mauritius.

== Costume ==
Jill Taylor, the costume designer, thought Lou would have more of a 'quirky' wardrobe based on the book: "she has these ‘leprechaun’ shoes, so we had to find some quirky shoes. By accident, we were in a shop and found these amazing shoes by Irregular Choice, and I just thought, ‘Oh, my God, that's Lou!’ They suddenly became the basis of her wardrobe of shoes.” Will's clothing was more based on his pre-accident life and he generally wore luxurious suits.

== Release ==
In July 2014, it was announced that the film would be released on 21 August 2015. In May 2015, the film's release date was moved to 3 June 2016. In November 2015, the film's release date was brought forward, to 4 March 2016, before being delayed again in January 2016, to its previous 3 June 2016 release date.

== Reception ==
=== Box office ===
Me Before You grossed $56.2 million in North America and over $152.2 million in other territories for a total of $208.4 million, against a budget of $20 million.

In North America, Me Before You opened on 3 June 2016 alongside Popstar: Never Stop Never Stopping and Teenage Mutant Ninja Turtles: Out of the Shadows and was expected to gross around $15 million from 2,704 theaters in its opening weekend. The film grossed $1.4 million from its Thursday night previews and $7.8 million on its first day. In its opening weekend the film grossed $18.3 million, finishing third at the box office behind Teenage Mutant Ninja Turtles: Out of the Shadows ($35.3 million) and X-Men: Apocalypse ($22.3 million).

=== Critical response ===
On Rotten Tomatoes, the film has an approval rating of 55% based on reviews from 177 critics, and an average rating of 5.5/10. The site's critical consensus reads, "Me Before You benefits from Emilia Clarke and Sam Claflin's alluring chemistry, although it isn't enough to compensate for its clumsy treatment of a sensitive subject." On Metacritic, the film has a score of 51 out of 100 based on 36 critics, indicating "mixed or average reviews". Audiences polled by CinemaScore gave the film an average grade of "A" on an A+ to F scale.

Chris Nashawaty of Entertainment Weekly gave it a grade of B+ and wrote: "It may not quite rise to the level of a classic three-hankie tearjerker, but it's proof that sometimes one or two hankies is more than enough to get the job done."

=== Accolades ===
Award	Category	Recipient(s)	Result	Ref.
People's Choice Awards	Favorite Dramatic Movie	Me Before You	Won	
Teen Choice Awards	Choice Movie: Liplock	Emilia Clarke and Sam Claflin	Nominated	
MTV Movie & TV Awards	Tearjerker	Emilia Clarke and Sam Claflin	Nominated	

=== Controversy and protests ===
The film sparked criticism from many in the disability rights movement, who perceived an underlying message that people with disabilities are a burden on their families and caregivers, and claimed the film promoted the view that people are better off dead than disabled. On 25 May 2016, anti-euthanasia campaigners targeted the London premiere at the Curzon Mayfair Cinema as the film had faced criticism over its depiction of disability and its assisted-dying plotline. They view the film as advocacy of suicide so that their loved ones can "live boldly". Others found the film exploitative of the disability community by stirring the emotions of viewers without actually aiding disabled people by accurate representation or employment in acting roles, while pointing out the casting of non-disabled actors as disabled characters. The #MeBeforeEuthanasia backlash was led by celebrities with disabilities including Liz Carr, Penny Pepper, Mik Scarlet and Cherylee Houston in the United Kingdom, and Dominick Evans and Emily Ladau in the United States, as well as activists from Not Dead Yet in both countries. Protests in the United States occurred in cities including Los Angeles, New York City, Boston, Hartford, Denver, Atlanta, Chicago, Baltimore, and Philadelphia. There were also protests in Australia.

In response to the backlash, author Jojo Moyes said the story was inspired by her own family where relatives required 24-hour care, as well as a real-life news story about a quadriplegic man who convinced his parents to take him to a centre for assisted suicide. About Traynor's decision, she said: "The fact is, in the film as in the book, nobody else agrees with what he decides to do. This is not by any means sending out a message. It's just about one character – it's nothing more than that."

== See also ==
- Guzaarish, 2010 Indian film about a quadriplegic man wishing to be euthanized.
- The Intouchables, 2011 French film about a quadriplegic man and his carer, inspired by the true story of Philippe Pozzo di Borgo and his French-Algerian carer Abdel Sellou.
- The Sea Inside, 2004 Spanish film based on the real-life story of Ramón Sampedro.
- La La Land, 2016 American film about a as a struggling jazz pianist and an aspiring actress who meet and fall in love while pursuing their dreams in Los Angeles, inspired by the true story of Damien Chazelle.
- Disability in the arts
