= After You =

After You may refer to:

== Songs ==
- "After You" (Dionne Warwick song), 1979
- "After You" (Beverley Knight song), 2007
- "After You" (Pulp song), 2013
- "After You" (Gryffin and Jason Ross song), 2021
- "After You, Who?", a 1932 song by Cole Porter
- "After You", a 1937 song by Frances Faye
- "After You", a song by Diana Ross from her 1976 album Diana Ross
- "After You", a song by Dan Seals from his 1983 album Rebel Heart
- "After You", a song by Meghan Trainor from her 2019 EP The Love Train and 2020 studio album Treat Myself
- "After You", a song by Stray Kids from their 2026 EP This & That
- "After You", a song by Tay-K, 2018

== Other uses ==
- After You..., originally Après vous..., a 2003 French film
- After You (novel), a 2015 novel by Jojo Moyes
- After You (album), a 2019 album by Jack Peñate
- After You, a 2010 novel by Julie Buxbaum
