= The Last Letter from Your Lover =

- UK promotional release poster
- Directed by: Augustine Frizzell
- Screenplay by: Nick Payne; Esta Spalding
- Based on: The Last Letter from Your Lover by Jojo Moyes
- Produced by: Simone Urdl; Jennifer Weiss; Graham Broadbent; Pete Czernin
- Starring: Felicity Jones; Callum Turner; Joe Alwyn; Nabhaan Rizwan; Shailene Woodley
- Cinematography: George Steel
- Edited by: Melanie Oliver
- Music by: Daniel Hart
- Production companies: Blueprint Pictures; The Film Farm; Canal+; Ciné+
- Distributed by: StudioCanal
- Release dates: 23 July 2021 (Netflix); 6 August 2021 (United Kingdom)
- Running time: 110 minutes
- Country: United Kingdom
- Language: English
- Box office: $1.5 million

The Last Letter from Your Lover is a 2021 British romantic drama film directed by Augustine Frizzell and written by Nick Payne and Esta Spalding, based on Jojo Moyes' 2011 novel. It stars Felicity Jones, Callum Turner, Joe Alwyn, Nabhaan Rizwan and Shailene Woodley.

Set in two distinct time periods, the film follows two women, 1960s housewife Jennifer Stirling and modern-day journalist Ellie Haworth and how both of them become intrigued by a letter they accidentally discover.

The Last Letter from Your Lover was released on Netflix in select territories on 23 July 2021, and in the United Kingdom on 6 August 2021, by StudioCanal.

== Plot ==
In the mid-1960s, wealthy socialite Jennifer Stirling experiences memory loss after a car crash. Unable to remember much of her life before or connect with her husband Laurence, Jennifer is intrigued by a letter she finds to "J" from "Boot". She decides to try and remember what happened to her by following clues from it.

In modern day London, Ellie Haworth, who recently broke up with her long-time boyfriend, is writing an article about the recently deceased editor of her paper. Getting past the formal archivist Rory to access the editor's archive, she finds a misfiled love letter, to someone identified as "J", from "Boot". Moved by the passionate feelings between the mysterious couple, Ellie becomes determined to learn their identities and how their love story unfolded.

In the past, a pre-crash Jennifer and her husband Laurence travel to the French Riviera to vacation. Foreign correspondent Anthony O'Hare arrives to interview Laurence about his business success. At the party, Laurence is condescending to both Jennifer and Anthony. Afterwards, a drunk Anthony complains about the awful company to a fellow guest and is overheard by Jennifer.

Anthony returns the next morning with a written apology, which Jennifer forces him to read aloud. He invites the Stirlings out for lunch the next day, but Laurence is called away on a sudden business trip, leaving the two to spend the summer together until his return. They begin writing letters to each other, under the pennames "J" and "Boot" (or "B"). Neither act on their growing electricity, until Jennifer impulsively tries to kiss him. When he pulls away, she flees. Some days later, Anthony sends her a letter, proposing to meet at Postman's Park in London.

They start a whirlwind affair, spending moments together when Jennifer can safely be with Anthony. Finally, he proposes she run off with him to NYC. She is hesitant to leave, fearing of becoming an outcast by her family and friends. After Anthony writes, saying he will be waiting for her at the train station on the night of his departure, Jennifer rushes off to meet him. Just before she can arrive, she gets into a car crash, with a blow to her head causing partial amnesia. Anthony leaves for NYC, believing that Jennifer has rejected him.

Six months after the car crash, Laurence hides the last letter Jennifer received from Anthony, hoping she does not remember the affair. Jennifer feels lost as she struggles to recover her memories. She begins finding several of the love letters from "Boot" hidden in her house, leading her to discover a postal box in her name that Laurence had closed. Jennifer confronts him, who claims Anthony had died in the crash.

Four years later, Jennifer bumps into Anthony, restoring her memories of their time together. He once again begs her to run away with him, but she refuses due to her two-year-old daughter. Enraged at Laurence for his lies, Jennifer asserts that she will stay with him only for their daughter, but vows to leave if he mistreats her. In turn, Laurence threatens to ruin Jennifer's reputation and gain sole custody of their daughter, as she would only be seen as an adulteress by the courts. This prompts Jennifer to escape with their daughter to go with Anthony.

Discovering he has checked out of his hotel, she hurries to his workplace, but is informed by the editor that Anthony has already left. Forced to return to Laurence, Jennifer gives the bundle of love letters to the editor to be sent to Anthony if they hear from him.

In the present day, Ellie and Rory grow closer as they uncover more of the love letters. After spending the night with Rory, Ellie distances herself from him. She learns that Jennifer and Anthony are both alive and speaks to each of them.

After hearing their regrets and pain over their lost romance, Ellie decides to enter into a relationship with Rory, choosing to give romance another try and not live with regrets. Ellie convinces Anthony to write Jennifer one last letter, in which he asks her to meet him once again at Postman's Park. Ellie and Rory watch from a distance as the two lovers reunite.

== Cast ==
- Felicity Jones as Ellie Haworth, a young journalist who uncovers a series of love letters in the archives in present-day London
- Callum Turner as Anthony O'Hare, a financial journalist who is writing a story about Laurence in the 1960s, Jennifer's lover
  - Ben Cross as older Anthony O'Hare
- Joe Alwyn as Laurence Stirling, Jennifer's husband in the 1960s who is a successful but stern industrialist
- Shailene Woodley as Jennifer Stirling, a socialite in the 1960s who has a perfect life, Laurence's wife, Anthony's lover
  - Diana Kent as older Jennifer Stirling
- Nabhaan Rizwan as Rory McCallan, an archivist who is a colleague of Haworth
- Ncuti Gatwa as Nick, a co-worker of Haworth
- Emma Appleton as Hannah
- Zoe Boyle as Anne

== Production ==
In August 2019 it was announced that Augustine Frizzell would direct the film. It was announced that filming was set to begin on 14 October 2019 in Mallorca, and that Felicity Jones and Shailene Woodley would star and serve as executive producers. Production moved to the United Kingdom and wrapped after 45 days on 15 December 2019.

== Release ==
In October 2019, Netflix acquired distribution rights to the film for the world excluding the United Kingdom, France, Germany, Australia, New Zealand, Scandinavia and China. It was released on Netflix in select territories on 23 July 2021. It was released in the United Kingdom and Ireland on 6 August 2021.

== Reception ==
On the review aggregator website Rotten Tomatoes, the film holds an approval rating of 55% based on 71 reviews, with an average rating of 5.6/10. The website's consensus reads: " The Last Letter from Your Lover benefits from solid performances and a striking visual style, although its double dose of melodrama may prove too much for some viewers." On Metacritic, the film has a weighted average score of 57 out of 100 based on 19 critic reviews, indicating "mixed or average reviews".
