= St. Thomas–St. Vincent Orphanage =

- Anchorage, Kentucky; United States

Information
- Type: Private, coed orphanage
- Religious affiliations: Roman Catholic; Sisters of Charity of Nazareth
- Patron saints: St. Thomas & St. Vincent de Paul
- Opened: 1832: St. Vincent Orphanage (girls); 1850: St. Thomas Orphanage (boys); 1952: merger into St. Thomas–St. Vincent Orphanage (coed)
- Closed: 1983
- Oversight: Archdiocese of Louisville
- Enrollment: 450 (1982)
- Campus size: 230 acres
- Campus type: Rural
- Graduates: St. Thomas Orphanage: 10,000+

St. Thomas–St. Vincent Orphanage was an orphanage located in Anchorage, Kentucky, best known for allegations of child sexual and physical abuse by one priest, seven nuns, and five laymen, between the 1930s and 1970s. It opened with the merger of St. Thomas Orphanage and St. Vincent Orphanage in 1955 and closed in 1983 as a result of rising costs and increased government services for orphans.

== History ==
=== St. Vincent Orphanage ===
St. Vincent Orphanage, for girls, was opened in 1832 in Louisville, Kentucky, by the Sisters of Charity of Nazareth. It was first located at 443 South 5th Street until 1836, then moved to the corner of Wenzel and Jefferson Streets from 1836 to 1892, the present site of Bellarmine University from 1892 to 1901, and 2120 Payne Street to 1955, the year of the merger with St. Thomas Orphanage.

=== St. Thomas Orphanage ===
In 1850, Bishop Martin J. Spalding of the Diocese of Louisville, Kentucky delegated Father Francis Chambige to establish an orphanage for boys, as the Sisters of Charity of Nazareth had recently established one for girls. It opened near Bardstown, Kentucky, in 1858, on farmland owned by St. Thomas Seminary. Two Sisters of Charity of Nazareth were assigned to the orphanage, and the first boys lived in a seminary dormitory building. When those facilities became too crowded, the seminary donated some of the farmland and built a building for the orphanage. The land included vegetable gardens, which helped with food costs until the Civil War, when both Union and Confederate soldiers would scour the land and take the food. In 1889, the original building burned down and the orphanage was moved temporarily to facilities in Louisville, Kentucky, on what is now the location of Bellarmine University, where it was located in the building of the recently closed Preston Park Seminary from 1910 to 1938. The St. Thomas then moved to new facilities on Ward Avenue, Anchorage, Kentucky.

=== St. Vincent–St. Thomas Orphanage ===
In 1952, St. Thomas Orphanage and St. Vincent Orphanage merged to form St. Thomas–St. Vincent Orphanage, located at St. Thomas's former Anchorage location. From St. Vincent, 81 girls moved to a newly completed wing of the St. Thomas building, allowing many brothers and sisters to be reunited. The National Conference of Catholic Charities administered the new orphanage, and naturally, the Sisters of Charity of Nazareth staffed it, as they were the staffers of both the predecessor institutions.

In 1982, the orphanage held 450 children, up from 250 in 1966; much of this growth can be attributed to more abused and neglected children being taken in rather than solely orphans. Living conditions during the orphanage's last years have been revealed by a former resident from 1981 to 1983, who was written about in a 2005 Washington Post article describing St. Thomas–St. Vincent as:

Some sort of castle run by nuns. The orphanage housed about 450 children, who slept in a room as big as a gymnasium filled with dozens of beds. "I remember it being very cold," he said, "and always being scared."

In 1983, St. Thomas–St. Vincent Orphanage closed as a result of rising costs and increased government services for orphans. The building was demolished later that year, and was replaced by a housing development comprising 572 houses called Owl Creek Community.

== Facilities ==
The campus of St. Thomas–St. Vincent Orphanage, formerly the campus of St. Thomas Orphanage, was located on 230 rural acres. The first building, completed in 1938, held dormitories, classrooms, nurseries, reading and recreation rooms, and a training center. The grounds included vegetable and flower gardens as well as athletic fields. The final construction phase was completed in 1952 with a wing for girls from St. Vincent Orphanage during the merger. In 1954 a concrete and brick gymnasium was built at a cost of $100,000, and was connected to the main building by a sheltered pathway.

== Sexual and physical abuse ==
For around 40 years, St. Thomas–St. Vincent Orphanage, and its predecessors St. Thomas and St. Vincent orphanages were the sites of multiple instances of sexual and physical abuse of orphans at the hands of staff.

On July 14, 2004, a class-action lawsuit was filed on behalf of 45 victims alleging sexual and physical abuse at the three orphanages, all of which were operated by Catholic Charities and staffed by Sisters of Charity of Nazareth, who were the defendants in the case. More than 20 of the victims accused Father Herman J. Lammers, a priest and chaplain of the orphanage, while others accused seven nuns and two laymen. The accused were: Fr. Herman J. Lammers, Sr. Charlie, SCN, Sr. Madeline de Paul, SCN, Sr. Mary Camilla Donahue, SCN, Sr. Frances Howard, SCN, Sr. Eva Marie, SCN, Sr. Mary Ann Powers, SCN, Sr. Mary Alma Stuecker, SCN, Joseph Anthony, James Patrick Cronan, Joseph Michael, Anthony Louise Pereira, and Stanislas Kotska Willett.

The Sisters of Charity of Nazareth agreed to pay $1.5 million to settle the lawsuit.

=== Notable cases ===
Ann Wilson of Mississippi, was born in 1945 and lived at St. Thomas–St. Vincent Orphanage in the early 1950s with her four sisters, all of whom later filed suits. She and her sisters all claimed to have been raped and molested by Fr. Lammers, and one was impregnated, and had a miscarriage. They also spoke of physical and sexual abuse by nuns, who they alleged beat and molested them, and locked them in dark rooms without food.

Gladys Cambron, aged 72, was the oldest person to sue, and claimed she was molested by two nuns and a priest starting at age 6. She lived at St. Vincent Orphanage from 1938 until 1943, and accused Fr. Lammers of sexually abusing her. She alleged physical as well as sexual abuse by nuns, saying that she was punished for talking in class by being tied to a chair while a nun "beat the life out of me."

Kim Michele Richardson wrote a memoir about her experiences at the orphanage in 2009, The Unbreakable Child. Richardson confronts the institutionalized physical and emotional abuse suffered by orphans at the hands of their caretakers, and also documents the lawsuit.

== See also ==
- Catholic Church sexual abuse cases
- Catholic sex abuse cases in the United States
- Female child molesters
