= Gonzo Girl =

- Directed by: Patricia Arquette
- Written by: Rebecca Thomas; Jessica Caldwell
- Based on: Gonzo Girl by Cheryl Della Pietra
- Produced by: Tom Heller; Frank Hall Green; Cameron O'Reilly; Patricia Arquette
- Starring: Camila Morrone; Willem Dafoe; Patricia Arquette
- Cinematography: Bobby Bukowski
- Edited by: Todd Downing
- Music by: Pierre Charles
- Production companies: Rh Negative Entertainment; Catch & Release Films; Bayard Productions
- Release date: September 7, 2023 (TIFF)
- Running time: 107 minutes
- Country: United States
- Language: English

Gonzo Girl is a 2023 American drama film written by Rebecca Thomas and Jessica Caldwell, directed by Patricia Arquette and starring Camila Morrone, Willem Dafoe and Arquette. It is based on the 2015 novel of the same title by Cheryl Della Pietra. It is also Arquette's feature directorial debut.

The film premiered at the Toronto International Film Festival on September 7, 2023. Arquette re-edited an "American version" (in contrast to the original "European cut") of the film which premiered at the 2025 Tribeca Film Festival.

== Premise ==
1992. An aspiring writer, Alley Russo, is hired as an assistant to legendary "gonzo journalist" Walker Reade. Her role is to help the famous Walker calm down on his addictions in order to finally publish his long-promised new work. Alley soon discovers that a lifetime of drug addiction has eroded Walker's writing abilities, and his work is little more than incoherent ramblings. Alley then begins to transform his notes into presentable prose, effectively writing his work for him.

== Cast ==
- Camila Morrone as Alley Russo
- Willem Dafoe as Walker Reade
- Patricia Arquette as Claudia
- Elizabeth Lail as Devaney Peltier
- Ray Nicholson as Larry Lukes
- Leila George as September McAvoy
- Rick Springfield
- Sean Penn
- James Urbaniak

== Production ==
Production on the film occurred in Utah in August 2022.

== Release ==
The film premiered at the 2023 Toronto International Film Festival.

== Reception ==
The film has a 59% rating on Rotten Tomatoes based on 27 reviews.
