= Augustine Frizzell =

American actress, film director, and screenwriter

- Born: July 27, 1979 (age 46); Garland, Texas, U.S.
- Occupations: Filmmaker; actress
- Years active: 2003–present
- Spouse: David Lowery (m. 2010)
- Relatives: Lefty Frizzell (grandfather)

Augustine Frizzell (born July 27, 1979) is an American actress, film director, and screenwriter. She made her feature film directorial debut with Never Goin' Back (2018).

== Early life ==
Growing up in Garland, Texas, Frizzell attended South Garland High School. She took classes at Richland College.

== Career ==
Frizzell made her directorial debut with the 2018 film Never Goin' Back, which starred Maia Mitchell and Camila Morrone as two waitresses trying to get to Galveston. The film premiered at the 2018 Sundance Film Festival, and was later distributed by A24.

In 2018, Frizzell directed the pilot for HBO's Euphoria.

Frizzel's next film was an adaptation of Jojo Moyes novel The Last Letter from Your Lover. The film starred Felicity Jones and Shailene Woodley and premiered in 2021 through online streaming service Netflix.

== Personal life ==
Frizzell is the granddaughter of musician Lefty Frizzell. She is married to fellow filmmaker David Lowery.

Frizzell has a daughter, Atheena Frizzell, who is also a director and actress.

== Filmography ==
Films

Year	Title	Director	Writer	Notes
2018	Never Goin' Back	Yes	Yes	Also editor
2021	The Last Letter from Your Lover	Yes	No	

Television

Year	Title	Episode(s)
2019	Euphoria	"Pilot"
2019	Sweetbitter	"The Pork Special" "Equifax & Experian"
2026	The Boroughs	"A Pyramid" "Forbidden Fruit" "Time To Go" "Triple Audible"
