= The Book Woman of Troublesome Creek =

2019 novel by Kim Michele Richardson

- Author: Kim Michele Richardson
- Language: English
- Genre: Historical fiction
- Published: May 7, 2019
- Publisher: Sourcebook Landmark
- Publication place: United States
- ISBN: 1-492-69163-1

The Book Woman of Troublesome Creek is a 2019 novel by Kim Michele Richardson. The story is a fictionalized account of real subjects in the history of eastern Kentucky. Cussy Mary is a "Book Woman" — one of the Packhorse Librarians who delivered books to remote areas of the Appalachian Mountains during the Great Depression, from 1935 to 1943, as part of President Franklin D. Roosevelt's Works Progress Administration (WPA) program. Cussy Mary is also a "Blue" — the last of a line of blue-skinned people, whose skin appears the unusual shade due to a rare genetic disorder. As a Book Woman, Cussy Mary is highly regarded, but as a Blue, she is feared and reviled, and experiences racism, discrimination, and violence.

== Plot summary ==
In 1936 eastern Kentucky, 19-year-old Cussy Mary Carter works for the New Deal–funded Pack Horse Library Project, delivering reading material to the remote hill people of the Appalachian Mountains. Cussy Mary, sometimes known as Bluet, lives with her coal-miner and labor-organizing father, and feels her work as a librarian honors her long-dead mother, who loved books. The Carters are the last of the Blue People of Kentucky, considered to be "colored" by the segregationist white community. Her "Pa", Elijah, slowly dying from lung disease from working in the mines, is determined to marry his daughter off, at any cost, in order to ensure her future security. But Cussy Mary loves her independence, her calling, and the joy she helps bring people with books, and would not be able to continue as a married woman. While the people of the small nearby town that headquarters the library treat her badly as a Blue, at least some of her patrons love and respect her.

To Cussy Mary's relief, none of her potential suitors are willing to marry a Blue. But when Elijah offers land as a dowry, the much-older Charlie Frazier agrees to the union. He rapes and severely beats Cussy Mary on the night of their hasty and secretive wedding, but then collapses and dies of an apparent heart attack. Cussy Mary is relieved to be free of the burden of wedlock to this distasteful man, returns home to her "holler", and rededicates herself to her work. A new patron on her route, Jackson Lovett, piques her romantic and intellectual interest, but she also soon realizes that a relative of Charlie's, an evangelical preacher named Vester Frazier, is stalking her as she traverses her remote trails, and means her harm. One night Vester tries sneak up on her cabin, and Pa is forced to kill him. Pa knows that Blues can be hung for less than a white man's death in self defense, and that two dead Fraziers — a large area clan — are too much to get away with. They turn to Doc, a local physician who has long been eager to test and study the Blues, and he helps the Carters steer clear of suspicion in return for access to Cussy Mary. He takes her to a hospital in Lexington for tests, where she is poorly treated, humiliated, and physically invaded, but he basically means well and also provides Cussy Mary with food, which she shares with the starving school children on her route, many of whom suffer from pellagra and are facing death.

The doctor's medical tests lead to the discovery that Cussy Mary and her father have methemoglobinemia, a rare genetic blood disorder that results in unoxygenated blood, causing the blue appearance of their skin. Pa is uninterested in a "cure", but Cussy Mary takes Doc's pills of methylene blue, which turns her skin white. However, the treatment is accompanied by side-effects of headaches and vomiting, and is very short-term. Cussy Mary revels in experiencing herself as white, and "normal", for a while, but soon realizes that the townsfolk still do not accept her. Moreover, they are convinced that her change in appearance is a sign of disease that they might catch. When she tries to join a sewing circle, now that she is "white", she is summarily rejected. She stops the treatment.

Everything changes for Cussy Mary one day upon arriving at the Moffit cabin. Young and pregnant Angeline Moffit is one of the only people who unreservedly love Cussy Mary, and touch her — for example, holding her hand. But her husband Willie refuses any contact with Cussy Mary, even eye contact. When Willie was wounded, he refused to accept medical care from her. On this day, Cussy Mary finds a man hanging from a tree, with a blue infant crying below. She realizes the man is Willie, who has appeared Blue in death. She rushes inside, and finds Angeline bleeding profusely, having given a very difficult birth. Cussy Mary realizes that Angeline and her husband were also Blue descendants, and their baby, Honey, inherited the condition. As Angeline lies dying, Cussy Mary promises to adopt the child, and pretend she was the result of her short-lived marriage.

Shortly thereafter, Pa dies just as the mine faces closing, and Jackson ties his life to Cussy Mary's — though they are forced to pay a heavy price as Cussy Mary's detractors invoke anti-miscegenation laws to thwart their happiness.

== Background ==
=== Pack Horse Library Project ===
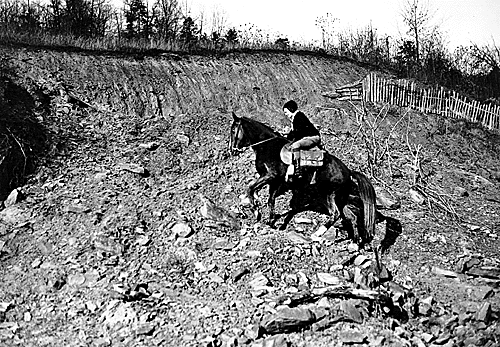
Pack horse librarian traversing rocky trail.

The Pack Horse Library Project (1935-1943) was part of the Works Progress Administration (WPA) program. Librarians, the vast majority of whom were women, delivered books to remote regions in the Appalachian Mountains. Riding horses, donkeys or mules, on foot or by rowboat, the librarians — various known as "book women", "book ladies" or "packsaddle librarians" — would follow long, mountainous routes, riding hundreds of miles each week in difficult weather and trail conditions, in dozens of rural counties where there were no libraries at all. Approximately 30 pack horse libraries served between 100,000 and 600,000 people, known as "patrons", in the mountain areas. The libraries also served around 155 schools in these counties by 1937. The librarians would collect recipes, sewing patterns, folk medicines, prayers, and other items from magazines and their grateful patrons, and created scrap books to help the isolated folk share knowledge. They also put together picture books for the children. The federal government paid only for the salaries, so the library project depended on donations, and circulated a relatively small number of books; however, being the only source of reading material for so many people, the books, magazine and severely out-of-date newspapers they brought were highly prized. The project also enabled about 1,000 to make a living during difficult times, with a salary of $28 a month, while providing their own mounts. The program was widely popular, and its benefits proven, as school children who enjoyed the service were reported to exhibit markedly higher performance in class. In 1956, Kentucky Congressman Carl D. Perkins (who had benefitted from the program as a teacher in Knott County) was inspired to sponsor the Library Services Act, which provided the first federal appropriations for library service.

=== The Blue People of Kentucky ===
Also known as the Blue Fugates of Troublesome Creek, the Kentucky Blues were a family line that existed in eastern Kentucky for almost 200 years. In 1820, a French orphan named Martin Fugate arrived in Troublesome Creek to benefit from a land grant. Unbeknownst to him, he carried a recessive gene for a condition known as methemoglobinemia, and against the odds, the local woman he married, Elizabeth Smith, also carried this extremely rare gene. As a result, four of their seven children were born with blue skin. The Fugates lived in an isolated area, with only a handful of other families, and they also suffered discrimination and alienation due to their unusual appearance. As a result, the family progenated within a limited gene pool, with at least one recorded case of inter-familial marriage between an aunt and nephew, ensuring that the recessive gene continued to appear generation after generation. The Fugates tended to be long-lived, and the condition did not cause any negative health effects.

In the 1960s, two family members made contact with a hematologist named Madison Cawein III. Cawein drew their blood for testing, and began charting the family tree to track the appearance of the phenomenon. He discovered that the blood of the affected family members was brown rather than red, and the cause of the appearance of blue skin. Cawein heard of a similar phenomenon among native Alaskans, documented by a public health service doctor named E. M. Scott. Scott theorized that the absence of the enzyme diaphorase in the red blood cells prevented the reconversion of methemoglobin to hemoglobin, resulting in the condition known as methemoglobinemia, and that it is caused by a recessive gene. Cawein treated the family with methylene blue, which temporarily transformed their skin to "normal" hues; however, the treatment only lasted about a day, and involved unpleasant side effects.

As the 20th century progressed, improved transportation and communications reduced the isolation of the Fugates in their Appalachian "holler", and the family dispersed, while the new genes introduced to the line made the appearance of methemoglobinemia increasingly rare. The last-known Blue Fugate was Benjamin Stacy, born in 1975. His blue appearance caused an emergency response upon his birth, but his grandmother informed the medical staff that blue skin runs in the family, and indeed, the infant was born healthy. His blue appearance gradually diminished, and only when he was agitated or very cold, would the blue tinge appear in his fingertips and lips.

== Characters ==
- Cussy Mary "Bluet" Carter: A Book Woman in the New-Deal library project. Named "Cussy" after the village in France from which her family came. She travels to remote hill areas of Appalachia to bring books and other reading material to individuals and schools. Cussy Mary is the last of the Kentucky Blues; her family carries a recessive gene that causes methemoglobinemia, a blood disorder causing the skin to appear blue. Cussy Mary and her father receive violent and discriminatory treatment from other people, and are considered "colored". Cussy takes great pride in helping the "Kaintuck" folk on her route, offering them more than the books they cherish — offering food, medicine, information and reading as much as she can. She lives with her Pa in a "holler", and goes into town once a month to organize books for the library. Otherwise, she collects books from an outpost she set up in the hills. After a traumatic marriage that lasts only one night, her husband dies, and his kinfolk hold a grudge against her. Cussy Mary develops a romantic interest in Jackson Lovett, a local man who made a name for himself working on the Hoover Dam out west. She is friendly with Angeline Moffit, a pregnant 16-year old hill resident, and Queenie, a fellow librarian and one of only a handful of Black people living in the Troublesome Creek area.
- Elijah "Pa" Carter: Cussy Mary's father. His blue skin is largely hidden by the coal dust his is covered with from working in the mines. He suffers from a terminal lung disease from mining without any protective gear. Pa is determined to find a husband for Cussy Mary, as he believes books are overrated and that women shouldn't work outside the home, and he want to ensure her financial security once he's gone. Since no one is interested in marrying a Blue, he offers 10 acres of land as incentive. Each potential suitor arrives at the cabin, and Pa gives Cussy Mary a "courtin' candle", which is lit at the beginning of the visit, which ends as the candle is spent. Cussy, for her part, is concerned about Pa's safety, as she believes that the other miners are endangering him just because he's a Blue, both in the mine work and in the miners attempts to organize against the mine owners to demand better conditions. Pa is forced to kill Vester Frazier when he attempts to harm Cussy Mary, leading the Carters to become beholden to Doc, who uses his power to keep them from being lynched for the killing to force Cussy Mary to allow him to study her and perform tests on her.
- Junia: Cussy Mary's ornery mule, inherited from Charlie Frazier. Junia is more likely to cause a ruckus than do what is expected, but Cussy Mary soon realizes that Junia hates men in particular, but responds well to women and children. Junia's hesitant affection towards Jackson foreshadows the positive relationship to develop between him and Cussy Mary. Junia is protective of Cussy Mary, refusing to walk into dangerous areas on the trail, and warning her of danger, such as from Vester Frazier.
- Charlie Frazier: An older hill man who marries Cussy Mary for the land offered by Pa. He rapes and severely beats her on their wedding night, causing her permanent damage. He then dies of a heart attack.
- Vester Frazier: An evangelical preacher and member of the Frazier clan, who becomes obsessed with "saving" Cussy Mary, presumably by raping her and forcibly baptizing her. Other people he had submitted to his baptisms had drowned, and Cussy Mary knows she is in real danger when Vester begins to stalk and threaten her. One night, Vester sneaks up to the Carter cabin, and is killed by Pa.
- Doc: A well-regarded physician, Doc has been trying for years to convince the Carters to submit to his tests. He gets his wish after Pa asks for his help keeping Vester Frazier's death a secret, and Cussy Mary is forced to accompany him to a hospital in Lexington to be studied. There, Doc has nuns force her to undress, he drugs her, and performs invasive examinations and tests. However, when his colleague Dr. Randall Mills wants to forcibly hospitalize Cussy Mary to study her, Doc puts his foot down and saves her from this fate. Doc gives Cussy Mary food and medicine for her cooperation, and later on, stands up for her when the sheriff threatens her union with Jackson.
- Queenie Johnson: A fellow Pack Horse librarian, Queenie is the sole provider for her five children. Other than Aletha, Doc's Jamaican housekeeper, Queenie's family are the only Blacks in Troublesome Creek. Queenie suffers from racial discrimination by her colleagues and the townspeople, and is determined to improve her lot in life. She is accepted as an assistant librarian in Philadelphia, where she then sets on a course to complete a degree in library science.
- Harriet Hardin: Assistant head librarian. She has a particular dislike of Cussy Mary, and finds every opportunity to humiliate her, such as designating the only bathroom in the library as "for whites only".
- Angeline Moffit: One of Cussy Mary's library patrons. 16 years old, and pregnant, she is married to Willie Moffit. She is one of the few people who treat Cussy Mary as a full human being, but her husband does not share her sentiment. When Willie is wounded, Angeline accepts help from Cussy Mary. When Angeline gives birth, the baby, Honey, is revealed as a Blue, causing Willie Moffit to hang himself. Angeline dies from wounds incurred in the difficult birth, but not before Cussy Mary promises to raise Honey as her own.
- Jackson Lovett: Newly returned from "out West", where he did important work on the Hoover Dam, Jackson is seen by some of the town-girls as a prize bachelor. Jackson is on Cussy Mary's book route, and the two strike up a friendship, which Cussy Mary occasionally dares to imagine as something more. By the end of the story, Jackson declares his love for Cussy Mary, and they marry, but Harriet arranges for Jackson's arrest for violating anti-miscegenation laws. Jackson is imprisoned, and the only way for the new couple and their adopted daughter to be together is to leave the state of Kentucky.
- Winnie Parker: The school teacher in the only school in the region, to which Cussy Mary delivers books. When Cussy Mary tries to give a bit of food to Henry ..., a child suffering from pellagra as a result of starvation — an all-too-common condition in the area — Winnie admonishes her that all should be fed, or none. Cussy Mary later brings the food she received from Doc to the school, to feed all the children at least a little bit.
- Loretta Adams: A nearly blind elderly patron who befriends Cussy Mary.
- Henry Marshall: One of the schoolchildren. Henry's mother is expecting a baby, and he is hoping this baby doesn't die like several others of his newborn siblings. Cussy Mary realizes that the entire family has developed pellagra, and despite her efforts, there is little she can do to help. Henry eventually dies, as did the newborn baby, and the rest of the family is expected to follow. Cussy Mary is heartbroken by this loss.

== Reception ==
The book was a New York Times bestseller, and was included in the best seller lists of the Los Angeles Times and USA Today.

Kirkus Reviews calls the narrative voice of Book Woman "engaging", and praises how well-researched the novel is, illuminating the history of 1930s Kentucky. The review concludes that Book Woman is "A unique story about Appalachia and the healing power of the written word." Publishers Weekly called the book a "gem of a historical", and though the review notes that the ending seems abrupt, "and some historical information feels clumsily inserted, readers will adore the memorable Cussy and appreciate Richardson’s fine rendering of rural Kentucky life." Toronto Star recommended Book Woman as "A quick, riveting read that celebrates the power of both books and community."

Philip K. Jason, in the Southern Literary Review's "May Read of the Month" recommendation, predicts that readers would find Book Woman to be "one of the most original and unusual contributions they will encounter in the realm of the current literature of the American South." He praises how beautifully the relationship between father and daughter is portrayed, as well as the "unexpected poetry" of Cussy Mary's voice and speech patterns, noting that for a bookish young woman, she nevertheless speaks in the hill people's dialect. In addition to the historical value and Richardson's accomplished "presentation of her protagonist’s challenges and perseverance within a culture hostile to deviation from norms", Jason finds of equal value the "reminder of the priceless necessity, the enduring thrill, of books and reading."

== Plagiarism affair ==
In 2019, several months after the publication of The Book Woman of Troublesome Creek, and two years after Book Woman sold to a publisher, per Publishers Weekly, Jojo Moyes came out with her own historical novel about the Pack Horse Library Project, The Giver of Stars. Several readers of advance copies noted significant similarity between the stories, despite the obvious differences, including plot devices that are not part of the historical record of the librarians. These include a marriage between two people with a 3-month old baby, a Black fellow librarian, an attack on a librarian by a vagrant, and small details, such as a request for a particular magazine because of a baby's teething issues. The claims caused what was sometimes called a "literary scandal" during the last months of 2019. Richardson acknowledged that history does not belong to any one person, and multiple people can have similar ideas, but that "the disturbing similarities found in Moyes' book are too many and too specific and quite puzzling. None of the similarities found in Moyes' novel can be chalked up to the realities of history, nor can be found in any historical records, archives or photographs of the packhorse librarian project initiative that I meticulously studied. These fictional devices/plot points were ones I invented."

Richardson brought her suspicions to her publisher, Sourcebooks Landmark, in which Moyes' publisher, Random House, owns a 45% stake. The publishing house determined that they would not take any action on the subject. Moyes, a British author and native living in England, stated she had a busy schedule and has not commented, but her imprint spokesperson has denied that she or the publisher had any prior knowledge of the existence of Book Woman or its contents. However it was later found that the publisher uploaded Richardson's Advanced Readers Copies of The Book Woman of Troublesome Creek on Edelweiss and other e-book sites as a comparison to Moyes' book, thereby conflicting with the first statement Moyes and her publisher gave of not being aware of Richardson's book. Richardson, asserting that she could not afford to engage her own counsel to pursue a legal claim in the expensive copyright courts, continued to answer the issue of what she termed "alarming similarities" to the media, which several articles attempted to track the timelines of the two books' drafts, submissions and publications — from which no clear picture has yet emerged.
