= After You (novel) =

Book by Jojo Moyes

- First edition
- Author: Jojo Moyes
- Language: English
- Genre: Adult novel; Realistic fiction; Romance
- Publisher: Michael Joseph (UK); Pamela Dorman Books (US)
- Publication date: 29 September 2015
- Publication place: United Kingdom
- Media type: Print (hardcover, paperback) e-book
- Pages: 448
- ISBN: 9781405926751
- Preceded by: Me Before You
- Followed by: Still Me

After You is a romance novel written by Jojo Moyes. It is a sequel to Me Before You. The book was first published on 29 September 2015 in the United Kingdom. A third novel in the series, Still Me, was published in January 2018.

== Plot ==
After You is a continuation of Louisa Clark's life after Will's death. Pursuing a more meaningful existence, as urged by Will, Louisa relocates to London and secures a job at an airport bar. One night, an unexpected conversation startles her on the roof of her building, leading to a severe injury from a fall.

Post-recovery, Louisa joins a support group based in a local church. Around the same time, she is approached by Lily, Will's unknown daughter, who seeks to understand her late father and connect with her paternal grandparents. Lily's strained relations with her immediate family prompt her to move in with Louisa.

At the same time, Louisa grows close to Sam, the uncle of a member from her support group, and one of the paramedics responsible for saving her life after her accident. As their relationship deepens, Louisa faces a difficult choice when her friend Nathan offers her a job in the United States. Despite her burgeoning feelings for Sam, Louisa takes the interview and is accepted for the role, reflecting her ongoing struggle between personal contentment and professional growth.

== See also ==
- Me Before You
