= Thea Sharrock =

British director

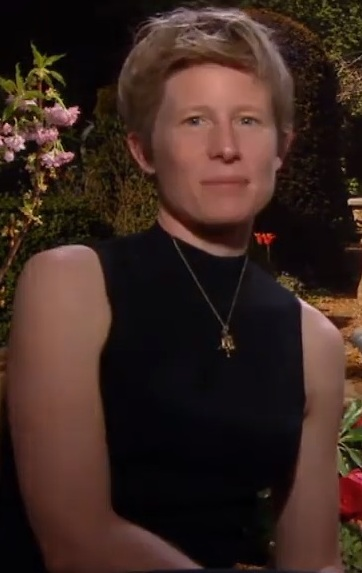
- Sharrock in 2016
- Born: January 1, 1976 (age 50); London, England
- Education: Corpus Christi College, Oxford
- Occupation: Director
- Spouse: Paul Handley
- Children: 2

Thea Sharrock is an English theatre and film director. In 2001, at age 24, she became the artistic director of London's Southwark Playhouse and the youngest artistic director in British theatre.

== Early life and education ==
Sharrock was born to journalist parents in London, but spent part of her childhood living in Kenya. She attended the Anna Scher Theatre School from the age of nine.

After her secondary education, Sharrock spent a gap year working in theatre. She first worked in administration at the Market Theatre in Johannesburg, where she was also allowed to assistant direct on one production, before returning to the UK, where she worked as a personal assistant at the NT studio.

She then read Philosophy and French at Corpus Christi College, Oxford. While a student there, she was president of the Oxford University Dramatic Society.

== Career ==
=== Theatre ===
After leaving Oxford early, before completing her degree, Sharrock took the directors course at the National Theatre, and worked as an assistant director on a number of productions at London theatres and on tour. In the summer of 2000, she won the James Menzies Kitchin Trust Award (JMK Trust Award), which allowed her to mount a production of Top Girls at the Battersea Arts Centre (BAC). The show was a success and toured the UK twice, before a brief run at a West End theatre.

She began her three-year tenure at the Southwark Playhouse in January 2001. In addition to work at the Playhouse, she served as an associate director on the long-running West End production of 'Art', directed works for the National Theatre and English Touring Theatre, and began her association with the Peter Hall Company. Sharrock left the Southwark Playhouse in late 2003, and became artistic director at the Gate Theatre in August 2004. She left this post in 2006, and had been widely tipped to take over at the Royal Court Theatre, although the post eventually went to Dominic Cooke. She served on the selection panel for the 2005 biennial Linbury Prize for Stage Design, and is now a JMK Award trustee.

Her production of Cloud Nine played at the Almeida Theatre from 31 October to 8 December 2007. In 2008, she directed Happy Now? at the National Theatre, before taking her 2007 West End revival of Equus to New York in 2008 with Daniel Radcliffe making his Broadway debut. In 2009, she directed a production of As You Like It at Shakespeare's Globe.

In 2010, Sharrock directed a revival of Martin Crimp's version of The Misanthrope originally by Moliere, at the Comedy Theatre starring Keira Knightley and Damian Lewis. Also in 2010, she directed Benedict Cumberbatch in the Olivier-winning revival of After the Dance by Terence Rattigan.

=== TV ===
In 2012, she directed Tom Hiddleston in Henry V as part of the BBC's miniseries The Hollow Crown.

=== Film ===
Sharrock's feature film debut, an adaptation of the novel Me Before You, was announced in 2014. The film was released in 2016 and grossed $207 million worldwide. She directed the 2020 Disney adventure The One and Only Ivan, based on the book of the same name. She directed Wicked Little Letters, which premiered in 2023, about a series of poison pen letters sent in 1920s Littlehampton in Britain.

== Personal life ==
Sharrock is married to National Theatre production manager Paul Handley, with whom she has two sons. Daniel Radcliffe is godfather to their son Misha.

== Filmography ==
Television

Year	Title	Director	Executive Producer	Notes
2012	The Hollow Crown	Yes	Yes	Episode "Henry V"
2013–2014	Call the Midwife	Yes	No	Episodes "Christmas Special" and "Episode 1"

Film

- Me Before You (2016)
- The One and Only Ivan (2020) (Also executive producer)
- Wicked Little Letters (2023)
- The Beautiful Game (2024)
- Ladies First (2026)

== Credits ==
=== Theatre ===
- Arabian Nights adapted by Dominic Cooke, Young Vic & UK tour (assistant director) 1998
- Speed-the-Plow by David Mamet, UK tour (assistant director) 2000; New Ambassadors, March 2000; Duke of York's, June 2000
- Top Girls by Caryl Churchill, Battersea Arts Centre 2 and tour, July 2000
- Art by Yasmina Reza, Wyndham's Theatre (associate director), 2001
- The Sleeper's Den by Peter Gill, Southwark Playhouse, June 2001
- Trip's Cinch by Phyllis Nagy, Southwark Playhouse, September 2002
- Mongoose by Peter Harness, Southwark Playhouse, April 2003
- Free by Simon Bowen, National Theatre, Lyttelton (Transformation Season) 2003
- The Fight For Barbara by D. H. Lawrence, Theatre Royal, Bath, July 2003
- Betrayal by Harold Pinter, Theatre Royal, Bath (associate director), July 2003
- The Deep Blue Sea by Terence Rattigan, (starring Harriet Walter) Theatre Royal, Bath & UK tour 2003
- Design for Living by Noël Coward, Theatre Royal, Bath (associate director) 2003
- A Doll's House by Henrik Ibsen, Southwark Playhouse, 2003
- Dom Juan by Molière translated by Simon Nye, Theatre Royal, Bath, 2004
- Blithe Spirit by Noël Coward, Theatre Royal, Bath & Savoy Theatre, 2004
- Tejas Verdes by Fermin Cabal, translated by Robert Shaw, The Gate Theatre, January 2005
- The Emperor Jones by Eugene O'Neill, The Gate Theatre, November 2005
- Private Lives by Noël Coward, Theatre Royal, Bath, July 2005
- Heroes: Le Vent Des Peupliers by Gérald Sibleyras, translated by Tom Stoppard. Wyndham's Theatre, October 2005
- In Celebration of Harold Pinter, The Gate Theatre (co-director), March 2006
- Comedy With Coward (masterclass), LAMDA, 2006
- A Voyage Round My Father by John Mortimer, Donmar Warehouse, June 2006; Wyndham's Theatre, September 2006
- The Chairs by Eugène Ionesco translated by Martin Crimp, The Gate Theatre, November 2006
- Equus by Peter Shaffer, Gielgud Theatre, February 2007
- Heroes, Geffen Playhouse, Los Angeles – April 2007
- The Emperor Jones by Eugene O'Neill, National Theatre, Olivier, August 2007
- Happy Now? by Lucinda Coxon, National Theatre, Cottesloe, January 2008
- The Misanthrope (version by Martin Crimp), Comedy Theatre, London, November 2009 – March 2010
- After the Dance by Terence Rattigan, National Theatre, Lyttelton, June 2010

=== Radio ===
- A Voyage Round My Father by John Mortimer – 2007 – BBC Radio Four
- The Homecoming by Harold Pinter – 2007 – BBC Radio 3
