= Never Goin' Back =

2018 film by Augustine Frizzell

Never Goin Back
- Theatrical release poster
- Directed by: Augustine Frizzell
- Written by: Augustine Frizzell
- Produced by: Toby Halbrooks; James M. Johnston; Liz Cardenas
- Starring: Maia Mitchell; Camila Morrone
- Cinematography: Greta Zozula
- Edited by: Courtney Ware; Augustine Frizzell
- Music by: Sarah Jaffe
- Production companies: Sailor Bear; Lucky Post
- Distributed by: A24
- Release dates: January 22, 2018 (Sundance); August 3, 2018 (United States)
- Running time: 85 minutes
- Country: United States
- Language: English
- Box office: $61,271

Never Goin' Back is a 2018 American stoner comedy film written, directed, and edited by Augustine Frizzell. It stars Maia Mitchell and Camila Morrone as two best friends who stumble through a series of misadventures as they try to get away for a vacation to Galveston, Texas.

The film had its world premiere at the Sundance Film Festival on January 22, 2018. It was released in the United States on August 3, 2018, by A24.

== Plot ==
In South Texas, Angela and Jessie are best friends and high school dropouts who spend their time working as waitresses at a mundane diner and wanting more out of their lives. One day, Angela decides to surprise Jessie by purchasing a trip to Galveston so they can spend Jessie's 17th birthday at the beach. She uses their rent money to pay for it and arranges for both of them to work extra hours at the diner to make up for the money they spent on the trip. However, Dustin, Jessie's goofy older brother and both girls' roommate, spends his part of the rent in a failed drug sale he attempted with his friends.

The next morning, Tony, Dustin's friend, breaks into the house and steals an old TV because he thinks Dustin stole the drug money. The police arrive to check the scene of the crime and discover Angela's and Jessie's stash of weed and cocaine. Both girls are arrested.

After spending two days in juvenile detention where Jessie suffers from constipation, the girls are released and learn that their boss Roderick wants to talk to them. While headed to the laundry to wash their uniforms, they run into former co-worker Paul who tells them that their mutual friend Art Dog is having a party at his home and that they can use his washing machine. At Art Dog's house, the girls try to remain sober, but they eat cannabis cookies by accident. They arrive high at their job and Roderick, even though he cares for both of them, makes the tough decision to fire them.

With all hope lost, Jessie comes up with the idea of convincing their other porn-addicted roommate Brandon to let them take the money from the cash register at the sandwich shop where he works and then tell the police he was robbed. At first, Brandon does not like the idea, but he accepts when the girls promise to have a threesome with him, a promise they do not intend to keep. At that moment, a disguised Dustin and his other friend Ryan enter and try to steal the money in order to recover what they lost in the drug deal. The girls immediately recognize them and they admit to Brandon they do not have enough money to pay for rent. After the boys leave, a terrified Brandon admits that there is only $50.00 in the register and that the rest is in a safe he does not have the key for.

Brandon's boss Mr. Dickson unexpectedly arrives and Brandon hides the girls in the utility closet. Dickson orders Brandon to leave, leaving Angela and Jessie trapped inside. Mr. Dickson then puts his penis inside of a sandwich bread and takes pictures of it, as the girls realize that he is an old man that they had yelled at for being sexist at a grocery store. Suddenly, Jessie starts having cramps due to the long constipation and defecates in a bucket. Feeling disgusted, Angela opens the closet door and vomits on Mr. Dickson, who passes out on the floor. Relieved that he is still alive, the girls check his phone and discover he is "sexting" with a woman who is not his wife. They use his key to open the safe and take the money before leaving a message for him telling they will show the pictures to his wife if he reports them to the police.

Back in the house, where Brandon, Dustin, Ryan, and Tony are all deeply sleeping, Angela and Jessie decide to leave them enough money to pay the rent and take the rest and go to California to start a new life. While they are talking about their plans, they fall asleep in their bed. Later, Angela and Jessie are having fun at the beach.

== Cast ==
- Maia Mitchell as Angela
- Camila Morrone as Jessie
- Joel Allen as Dustin
- Kendal Smith as Tony
- Matthew Holcomb as Ryan
- Kyle Mooney as Brandon
- Atheena Frizzell as Crystal
- Marcus M. Mauldrin as Roderick
- Raymond Gestaut as Mr. Dickson

== Release ==
The film had its world premiere at the Sundance Film Festival on January 22, 2018. Shortly thereafter, A24 acquired distribution rights to the film. It also screened at South by Southwest on March 10, 2018. It was given a limited theatrical release in the United States on August 3, 2018, with a peak distribution of 27 theatres, before being released on home video.

== Reception ==
=== Box office ===
Though released direct-to-video, the film grossed $61,271 at the box office during its limited release in the United States.

=== Critical response ===
On the review aggregator website Rotten Tomatoes, 76% of 63 critics' reviews are positive, with an average rating of 6.7/10. The website's consensus reads: "Never Goin' Back benefits from the chemistry between leads Maia Mitchell and Camila Morrone, whose easy rapport lifts a coming-of-age story with uncommon insight." Metacritic, which uses a weighted average, assigned the film a score of 62 out of 100, based on 19 critics, indicating "generally favorable" reviews.

Jake Nevins of The Guardian gave the film 4 out of 5 stars, describing the plot as thin, but wrote that the film worked "precisely because of its slightness: for these freewheeling, high-school dropouts, a weekend on the Gulf coast is a sojourn of Eat, Pray, Love proportions, and they’ve already blown next month’s rent to make it happen." Nevins also praised the film's naturalism, writing that "Frizzell, who’s given her young actors a smart, acid-tongued screenplay to work with, is just as savvy a director, resisting the urge to freshen up the film’s harsh environs with sepia-tones and sunlight." Richard Roeper of the Chicago Sun-Times gave the film 3 out of four stars, describing it as a "rude, crude, rambling, raucous, sometimes quite gross and often very funny and endearing slice of lives we don’t often see portrayed on the big screen," but criticized it as relying "a little too much on gross-out, scatological and stoner humor".
