= Brilliant Earth =

American jewelry company

- Type: Public
- Traded as: Nasdaq: BRLT
- Industry: Jewelry
- Founded: August 2005; 21 years ago
- Founders: Beth Gerstein; Eric Grossberg
- Headquarters: San Francisco, California, U.S.
- Key people: Beth Gerstein and Eric Grossberg, co-CEOs
- Revenue: ▲US$437 million (2025)
- Net income: ▼ −US$3.63 million (2025)
- Website: www.brilliantearth.com

Brilliant Earth is an American company that sells jewelry featuring diamonds and other gemstones that are asserted to be ethically sourced. The company was established in August 2005 by Beth Gerstein and Eric Grossberg, and is headquartered in San Francisco, California. According to Businessweek, the company has been influential in creating a market for ethically sourced jewelry. Some provenance claims were disputed as per a 2017 The Next Web article.

== History ==
The idea for Brilliant Earth was conceived in 2004 by two Stanford alumni, Beth Gerstein and Eric Grossberg. Gerstein has said she was looking for an ethically produced engagement ring in 2003, failing which she partnered with Grossberg to establish Brilliant Earth in August 2005, and launched their e-commerce website in July 2006.

The company has since opened showrooms in San Francisco, Atlanta, and elsewhere in the United States.

The company completed an initial public offering in September 2021.

== Operations ==
Brilliant Earth uses both natural diamonds and lab-created diamonds in its jewelry. The natural diamonds are sourced from Diavik and Ekati mines in Canada, and from Namibia and Botswana. The company's sapphires are from either Australia or Malawi.

The company uses recycled materials such as gold, silver and platinum or obtains them from co-ops that meet standards set by the Alliance for Responsible Mining.

== Community service ==
Brilliant Earth donates a part of its profits to charities that help African communities affected by conflict diamonds. In 2015, the company funded a mobile school in Lungudi, a village in the Democratic Republic of the Congo, for students at risk of working in the local diamond mines. It has also partnered with Rainforest Alliance, an international non-profit organisation.

== Controversy ==
In June 2017, The Next Web reported Brilliant Earth was indicated to have inventory sourced from Canadian origins, despite eight of the ten listed suppliers were from India. The report was initiated following an April 2017 YouTube video posted by self-claimed diamond industry insider Jacob Worth, wherein he investigated the origin of a Brilliant Earth diamond he had purchased, allegedly with a Canadian origin, to the New York supplier who reportedly indicated having no records of those origins. Brilliant Earth filed a lawsuit against Worth for defamation, but the suit was discontinued without prejudice and without any disbursements, according to a notice filed in New York Supreme Court. No settlement is known to have been reached and the video posted by Worth was taken down.
