= Mik Scarlet =

British television presenter (born 1965)

- Born: 1965 (age 60–61); Luton, Bedfordshire, U.K.
- Occupations: Inclusion and equality trainer

Mik Scarlet (born 1965) is a broadcaster, journalist, actor and musician, as well as an expert in the field of access and inclusion for disabled people. He has been voted one of the most influential disabled people in the UK, and was one of the first television presenters in the world with a physical disability.

== Early life ==
Scarlet was born in Luton, Bedfordshire. He is a wheelchair user due to the consequences of cancer during infancy. At six weeks old he was found to have a large malignant tumor, called an Adrenal Neuroblastoma. He was part of the first clinical trial for the drug Vincristin Sulphate, an American chemotherapy medication, and together with surgery and radiation therapy survived childhood cancer. However, these aggressive treatments left him with a paralyzed right leg, and he wore a metal leg brace consistently as a child and young adult.

At age 15, he underwent another series of surgeries to address a vertebrae deformation, caused as a side effect of earlier cancer treatments, that had collapsed and crushed the nerves that controlled Scarlet's right leg. After these surgeries he became a full-time wheelchair user. It was during this period he began teaching himself to play keyboard and program electronic music.

== Career ==
=== Musical Career ===
Scarlet attended Luton Sixth Form College in the 1980s and was active in the local punk music scene, playing in multiple bands with a revolving cast of siblings and schoolmates, until eventually forming the band Freak UK. Freak UK toured across the UK and supported the artist Gary Numan on the 1991 Emotion Tour.

=== Broadcasting Career ===
As one of the first generation of disabled television presenters, Scarlet is best known for presenting the 1992 Emmy Award winning and BAFTA nominated children's television programme Beat That on Channel Four. He won a UNICEF award for work with disabled children.

He has also played several cameo roles in shows such as Brookside and The Bill, and was a presenter for BBC2's From the Edge. He has appeared in numerous television programmes including 2point4 Children, and Wham! Bam! Strawberry Jam! (BBC 1995) which also featured Rik Mayall.

Scarlet is a regular correspondent for HuffPost. He wrote an article for The Independent in 2000 about social rights and was quoted in The Independent about the 2016 Summer Paralympics. In 2012, he wrote an article for Time Out about accessibility in London. That year, he performed in the Paralympic Opening Ceremony and presented coverage of the wheelchair rugby for The Paralympic Games.

Scarlet has appeared on various news and current affairs programmes, such as The Wright Stuff, Good Morning Britain, This Morning and Sky News, both as a commentator and reporter. Scarlet also is an occasional reporter for Channel Five News.

He is an ambassador for Parallel London, the inclusive, disability-led push/run event.

In 2018, Scarlet was named on The Shaw Trust Disability Power 100 list, an annual publication of the 100 most influential disabled people in the UK.
