= Jojo Moyes =

English novelist and journalist (born 1969)

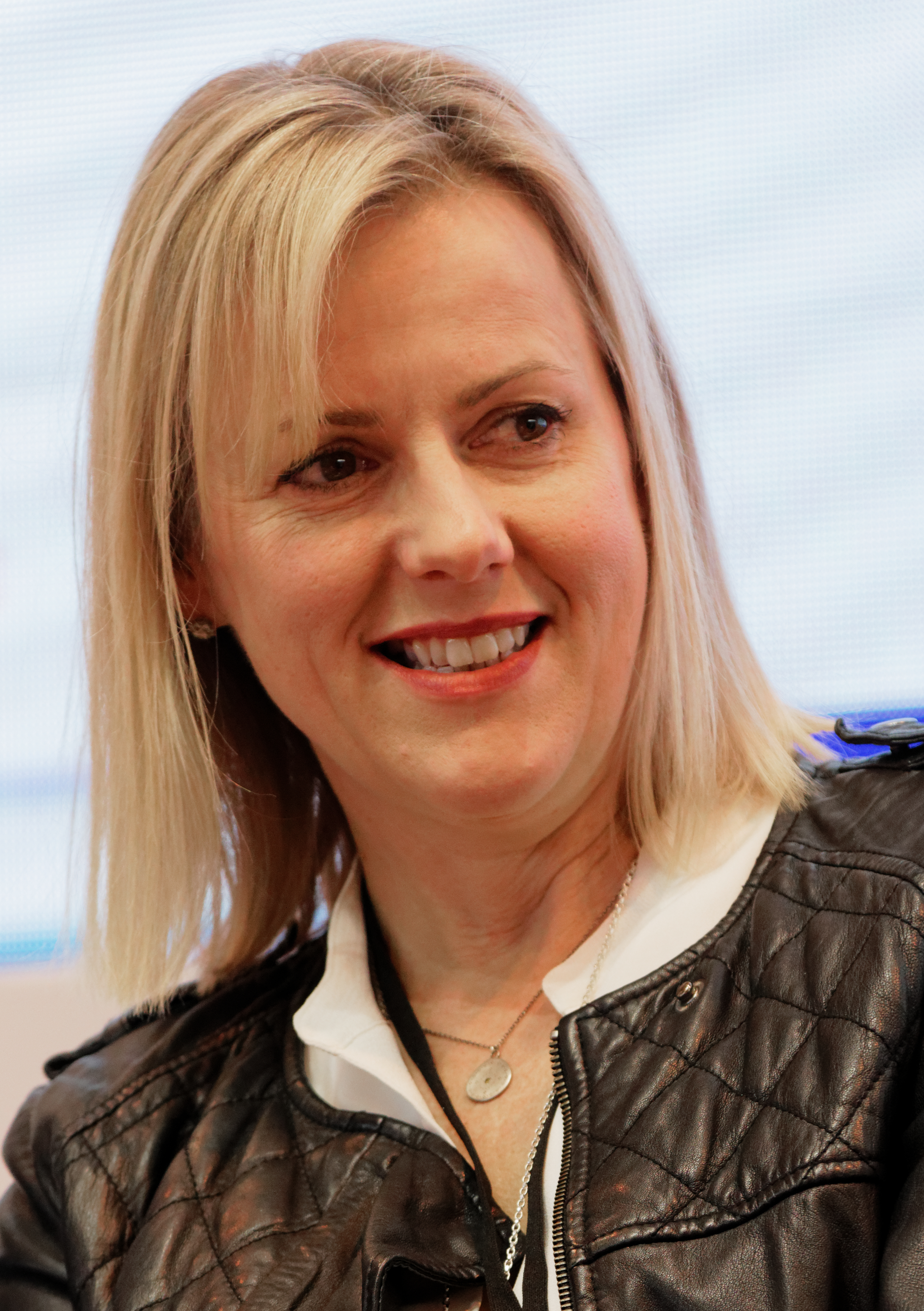
- Moyes in Paris, 2017
- Born: Pauline Sara Jo Moyes; 4 August 1969 (age 57); Maidstone, Kent, England
- Education: Royal Holloway, University of London
- Spouse: Charles (Maxwell) Arthur
- Children: 3
- Writing career
- Language: English
- Period: 1993–present
- Genre: Romance
- Website: www.jojomoyes.com

Pauline Sara Jo Moyes (born 4 August 1969), known professionally as Jojo Moyes, is an English journalist and, since 2002, an award-winning romance novelist, number-one New York Times best selling author and screenwriter. She is one of only a few authors to have twice won the Romantic Novel of the Year Award by the Romantic Novelists' Association and her works have been translated into twenty-eight languages and have sold more than 40 million copies worldwide.

== Life and early career ==
Pauline Sara-Jo Moyes was born on 4 August 1969, in Maidstone, England.

Before attending university, Moyes held several jobs: she was a typist at NatWest typing statements in braille for blind people, a brochure writer for Club 18-30, and a minicab controller for a brief time. While an undergraduate at Royal Holloway, University of London, Moyes worked for the Egham and Staines News.

She earned a journalism degree from City University as well as a degree at Royal Holloway and Bedford New College, London University.

Moyes won a bursary financed by The Independent newspaper, which allowed her to attend the postgraduate newspaper journalism course at City University in 1992. She subsequently worked for The Independent for the next 10 years (except for one year, when she worked in Hong Kong for the South China Morning Post) in various roles, becoming Assistant News Editor in 1998. In 2002 she became the newspaper's Arts and Media Correspondent.

== Writing career ==
Early in her writing career, Moyes wrote three manuscripts that were all initially rejected. With one child, another baby on the way, and a career as a journalist, Moyes committed to herself that if her fourth book was rejected, she would stop her efforts. After submitting the first three chapters of her fourth book to various publishers, six of them began a bidding war for the rights.

Moyes became a full-time novelist in 2002, when her first book Sheltering Rain was published. She continues to write articles for The Daily Telegraph.

Moyes' publisher, Hodder & Stoughton, did not take up the 2012 novel Me Before You and Moyes sold it to Penguin. It sold six million copies, went to number one in nine countries, and reinvigorated her back catalogue resulting in three of her novels being on the New York Times bestseller list at the same time. Moyes would later write two sequels to Me Before You: After You in 2015 and Still Me in 2018.

In 2013, it was announced that Michael H. Weber and Scott Neustadter had been hired to write an adaptation of Me Before You. In 2016 the film adaptation Me Before You was released and the screenplay was written by Moyes.

In 2018, Moyes invested £120,000 in the Quick Reads Initiative, an adult literacy project. Her investment gave the program three additional years of funding. Her book Paris for One and Other Stories is part of the 2015 Quick Reads collection and she contributed a short story to A Fresh Start, from the 2020 Quick Reads collection.

== Awards and achievements ==
- Moyes' books have been translated into forty-six languages, have hit the number one spot in twelve countries and have sold over forty million copies worldwide.
- Romantic Novel of the Year Award Winner (2004): Foreign Fruit.
- Romantic Novel of the Year Award Nominee (2008): Silver Bay.
- Romantic Novel of the Year Award Winner (2011): The Last Letter From Your Lover.
- Moyes first won the Romantic Novelists' Association's Romantic Novel of the Year Award in 2004 for Foreign Fruit and again in 2011 for The Last Letter From Your Lover. She is one of few authors to have received this award twice.
- Platinum Hall of Fame Winner for After You & Me Before You; Neilsen Awards.
- Gold Hall of Fame Winner for After You & Me Before You; Nielsen Awards.
- Me Before You hit the New York Times bestseller Top Ten chart in 2016 and spent 19 weeks on the chart.
- American Library Association winner for Me Before You, 2014.
- Good Reads Best Fiction Award Winner (2018): Still Me.
- The Giver of Stars is an international best-seller
- Book of The Year Winner (2007), Good Housekeeping: Silver Bay.
- Me Before You was nominated for Book of the Year at the UK Galaxy Book Awards.
- The Giver of Stars was shortlisted for the 2020 Fiction Book of the Year in the British Book Awards.
- Me Before You has sold more than 14 million copies worldwide.
- Me Before You film adaptation awards: People's Choice Awards Winner for Favourite Dramatic Movie (2017); ASCAP Award Winner for Top Box Office Films (2017); Golden Trailer Award Winner for Best Romance (2017)

== Literary influences ==
Moyes' favourite book in childhood was National Velvet by Enid Bagnold. She cites Behind the Scenes at the Museum by Kate Atkinson as a book that made her want to be a better writer, and she is inspired by authors such as Nora Ephron, Marian Keyes, Lisa Jewell, Jonathan Tropper, and Jane Austen.

== Personal life ==
Moyes now lives near Hampstead Heath, London, having previously lived on a farm in Great Sampford, Essex. She divorced her husband, journalist Charles Arthur, in 2020. In 2025 Moyes spoke enthusiastically on BBC Radio 4 of her lifelong love of horses, saying that her animals include an ex-racehorse and a rescued 58 kg (128 lb) female Pyrenean mountain dog.

== Published Works ==
=== Novels ===
- Sheltering Rain, AKA Return to Ireland (2002) ISBN 0-06-001289-7
- Foreign Fruit, AKA Windfallen (2003) ISBN 0-340-83414-5
- The Peacock Emporium (2004) ISBN 0-340-75204-1
- The Ship of Brides (2005) ISBN 0-340-83010-7
- Silver Bay (2007) ISBN 0-340-89593-4
- Night Music (2008) ISBN 0-340-89595-0
- The Horse Dancer (2009) ISBN 0-340-96160-0
- The Last Letter from Your Lover (2011) ISBN 0-670-02280-2
- Me Before You series:
  1. Me Before You (2012) ISBN 0-670-02660-3
  2. After You (2015) ISBN 0-698-41141-2
  3. Still Me (2018) ISBN 0-399-56245-1
  4. Lou In Lockdown (2020), short story ISBN 978-88-357-0347-1
- The Girl You Left Behind series:
  1. Honeymoon in Paris (2012), novella
  2. The Girl You Left Behind (2012) ISBN 0-670-02661-1
- The One Plus One (2014) ISBN 1-4059-0905-6
- The Giver of Stars (2019) ISBN 0-7181-8323-1
- Someone Else's Shoes (2023)
- We All Live Here (2025) ISBN 9781984879325

=== Short stories ===
Collections:

- Paris for One and Other Stories (2015), collection of 10 short stories and 1 novella: ISBN 0-7352-2107-3
  "Paris for One", "Between the Tweets", "Love in the Afternoon", "A Bird in the Hand", "Crocodile Shoes", "Holdups", "Honeymoon in Paris" (novella), "Last Year's Coat", "Thirteen Days with John C", "Margot", "The Christmas List"

== Adaptations ==
- Me Before You (2016), film directed by Thea Sharrock, based on novel Me Before You
- Im Schatten das Licht (2020), TV-film directed by Vivian Naefe, based on novel The Horse Dancer
- The Last Letter from Your Lover (2021), film directed by Augustine Frizzell, based on novel The Last Letter from Your Lover, distributed by Netflix
