= Me Before You (novel) =

2012 novel by Jojo Moyes

- First edition
- Author: Jojo Moyes
- Language: English
- Genre: Romance Fiction
- Publisher: Michael Joseph
- Publication date: 5 January 2012
- Publication place: United Kingdom
- Media type: Print (hardcover, paperback) e-book
- Pages: 480
- ISBN: 0-71-815783-4
- Followed by: After You

Me Before You is a romance novel written by Jojo Moyes. The book was first published on 5 January 2012 in the United Kingdom. A sequel titled After You was released on 24 September 2015 through Pamela Dorman Books. A second sequel, Still Me, was published in January 2018.

== Plot ==
Louisa Clark is hired to be the personal assistant to Will Traynor, a young man who became disabled after an accident. Louisa and Will's relationship starts out rocky due to his bitterness and resentment over being disabled. Things worsen after Will's ex-girlfriend, Alicia, and best friend Rupert reveal that they are getting married. Under Louisa's care, Will gradually becomes more communicative and open-minded as they share experiences together. Louisa notices Will's scarred wrists and later overhears his mother and father discussing how he attempted suicide shortly after his mother, Camilla, refused his request to end his life through Dignitas, a Swiss-based assisted suicide organization. Horrified by his attempt, Camilla promised to honour her son's wish, but only if he agreed to live six more months. Camilla intends to prove that, in time, he will believe his life is worth living.

Louisa conceals knowing about Will and Camilla's agreement. However, she tells her sister Treena, and together they devise ways that will help convince Will to abandon his death wish. Over the next few weeks, Will loosens up and Louisa begins taking him on outings and the two grow closer.

Through their frequent talks, Louisa learns that Will has travelled extensively; his favourite place is a café in Paris. Noticing how limited his life is now and that he has few ambitions, Louisa tries to motivate Will to change.

Louisa continues seeing her longtime boyfriend of 7 years, Patrick, though they eventually break up due to her relationship with Will. Meanwhile, Louisa's father loses his job, causing more financial difficulties. Steven Traynor, Will's father, offers Mr. Clark a position. Louisa realizes that Will is trying to help her secure her freedom from her family. The two attend Alicia and Rupert's wedding where they dance and flirt. Will tells Louisa that she is the only reason he wakes in the morning.

Louisa convinces Will to go on a holiday with her, but before they can leave, Will contracts near-fatal pneumonia. Louisa cancels the plans for a whirlwind trip. Instead, she takes Will to the island of Mauritius. The night before returning home, Louisa tells Will that she loves him. Will says he wants to confide something, but she admits that she already knows about his plans with Dignitas. Will says their time together has been special, but he cannot bear to live in a wheelchair. He will be following through with his plans. Angry and hurt, Louisa storms off and does not speak to him for the remainder of the trip. When they return home, Will's parents are pleasantly surprised by his good physical condition. Louisa, however, resigns as his caretaker, and they understand that Will intends to end his life.

Back at home Louisa is miserable and her mother is outraged when Louisa tells them everything about Will. The media and journalists arrive at the house having been tipped off by Patrick and the family become isolated. Treena then finds a message from Camilla Traynor requesting Louisa to come to Switzerland. Louisa accepts despite her mother forbidding it and flies out to see Will. Once reunited again at the clinic they agree that the past six months have been the best in their lives. He dies shortly after in the clinic, and it is revealed that he left Louisa a considerable inheritance, meant to continue her education and to fully experience life. The novel ends with Louisa at a café in Paris, reading Will's last words to her in a letter, that tell her to 'live well'.

== Reception ==
The book was placed on the Richard and Judy Book Club.

Disability advocates have criticised the book and film for suggesting that life may not be worth living for some with severe disabilities.

== Film adaptation ==
In 2014 MGM announced it would make a film adaptation of Me Before You, to be directed by Thea Sharrock and released via Warner Bros. The film was initially set to release in August 2015 but was pushed back to 3 June 2016.

Emilia Clarke and Sam Claflin portray the main characters. The film has grossed over $200 million worldwide.
