= Kim Michele Richardson =

American writer

- Citizenship: United States
- Occupations: Writer; Novelist
- Notable work: The Book Woman of Troublesome Creek
- Spouse: Joe Richardson
- Website: https://www.kimmichelerichardson.com/

Kim Michele Richardson is an American writer.

As a child Richardson was placed in a Kentucky orphanage, Saint Thomas-Saint Vincent Orphan Asylum. In 2004, she and her sisters, along with 40 other plaintiffs who had lived in the institution run by the Sisters of Charity order and the Roman Catholic Church sued for damages suffered through alleged years of abuse by their caretakers between the 1930s to the 1970s. Richardson recounted her experiences at the orphanage during the 1960s and 1970s in her memoir The Unbreakable Child.

In May 2024, Richardson was awarded an honorary Doctor of Humanities (L.H.D) degree by Eastern Kentucky University for "distinguished service to arts and culture".

== Bibliography ==
Fiction

- The Book Woman's Daughter (Sourcebooks Landmark, 2022); ISBN 9781728242590
- The Book Woman of Troublesome Creek (Sourcebooks Landmark, 2019); ISBN 978-1492691631
- The Sisters of Glass Ferry (Kensington, 2017); ISBN 978-1496709554
- GodPretty in the Tobacco Field (Kensington, 2016); ISBN 978-1617737350
- Liar's Bench (Kensington, 2015): ISBN 978-1617737336

Memoir

- The Unbreakable Child (Kunati, 2009); ISBN 978-0615714691
