= Sean Combs sexual misconduct allegations =

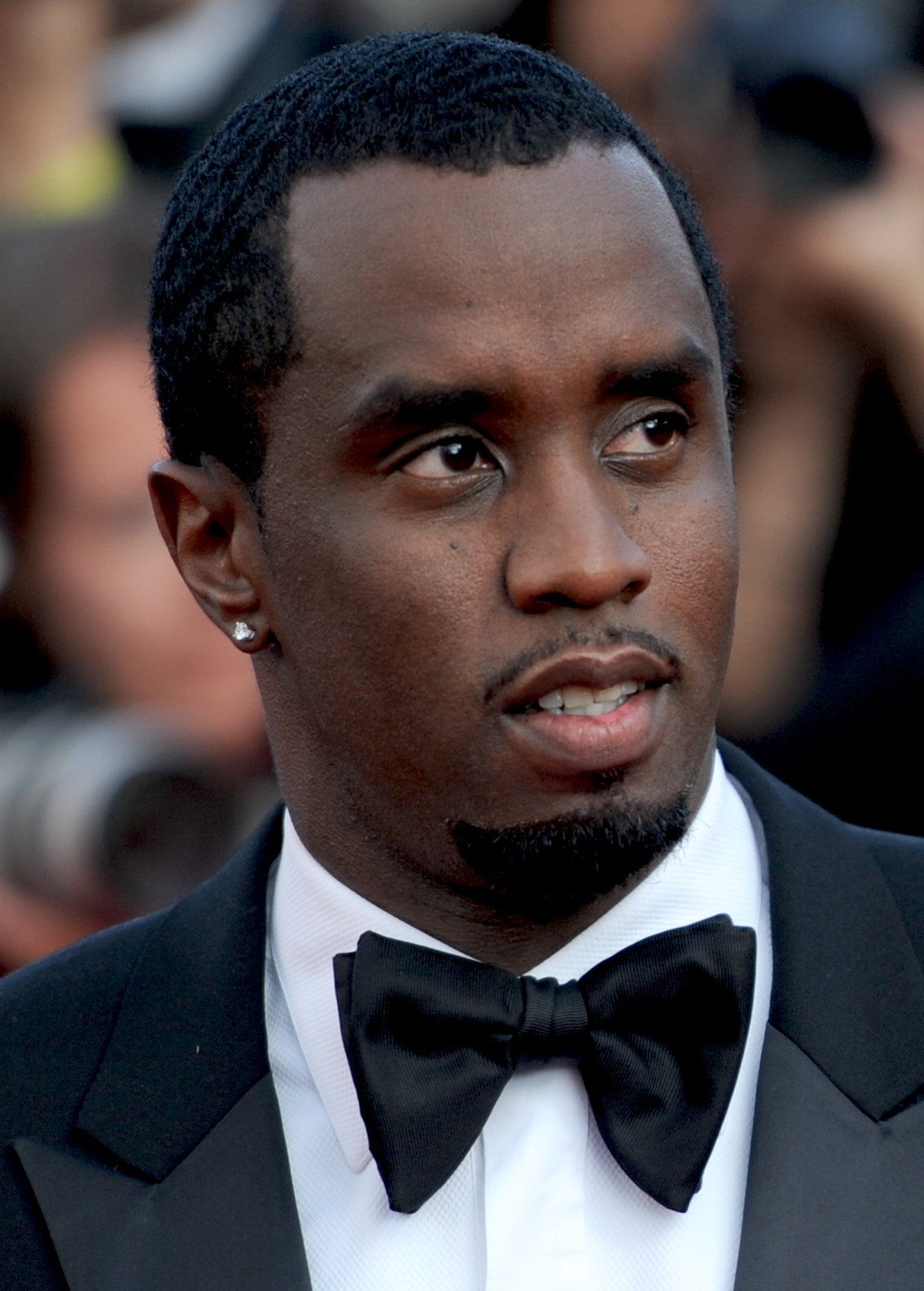
Sean Combs in 2012

American rapper and record producer Sean Combs, known professionally as Diddy (formerly Puff Daddy and P. Diddy), (Note: Combs adopted the stage name "Puff Daddy" in 1996 for his first release and would later change his name to "P. Diddy" in 2001 and to "Diddy" in 2005. This article uses "Combs" for consistency.) has faced repeated accusations of sexual misconduct for incidents dating from 1990 to 2023. He has faced at least 10 civil lawsuits related to abuse and sexual misconduct, and has also faced accusations of rape, drug-facilitated sexual assault, child sexual abuse, and sexual harassment. He pleaded not guilty to all of his federal criminal charges from 2024. Between November and December 2023, Combs was accused of sexual misconduct by four women including his former girlfriend Cassie Ventura, who alleged that she had been raped, trafficked, and physically assaulted by Combs multiple times over a period of ten years.

In May 2025, Combs was criminally tried for sex trafficking, racketeering and transportation to engage in prostitution. Combs was found not guilty in all but two transportation charges, for which he was sentenced to 4 years and 2 months in prison and a $500,000 fine.

As of October 2025, over 70 civil complaints have been filed against Combs that contain allegations of sexual misconduct.

== Civil lawsuits ==
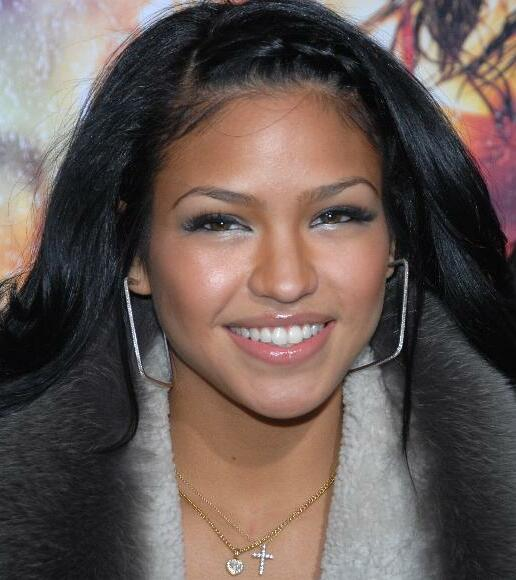
Cassie Ventura in 2008

In May 2017, Cindy Rueda, who previously served as Combs' personal chef, filed a lawsuit against Combs in the Los Angeles County Superior Court, claiming, among other things, sexual harassment and retaliation. The lawsuit was settled for an undisclosed amount in February 2019.

Cassie Ventura, with whom Combs had a long-term relationship, filed a lawsuit against him on November 16, 2023, accusing him of rape, sex trafficking, and physical abuse. The lawsuit also suggested that Combs was responsible for blowing up Ventura's then-boyfriend Kid Cudi's car. Combs and Ventura reached an undisclosed settlement the following day, and the lawsuit was dismissed. Ventura later testified in court that she had received a $20 million settlement in the case. On May 17, 2024, CNN released surveillance footage of Combs physically assaulting Ventura at the InterContinental hotel in Century City, Los Angeles, on March 5, 2016. This incident was among the allegations made in the lawsuit. On May 19, 2024, Combs issued a video apology on Instagram and Facebook, stating he was "truly sorry" and that his actions were "inexcusable". Combs' assault of Ventura was stopped by hotel staff, while, after the episode, Combs, according to a federal indictment in September 2024, allegedly tried to bribe the staff.

On November 23, 2023, two more lawsuits were filed. Liza Gardner alleged that Combs and Guy's Aaron Hall had both sexually assaulted her and her friend in 1990. Additionally, Joi Dickerson-Neal alleged that, in 1991, Combs drugged and sexually assaulted her and shared the video of her sexual assault. On December 6, 2023, in a lawsuit filed in the Southern District of New York, a Jane Doe alleged that, as a teenager, she was flown on a private jet from Detroit to New York by Bad Boy Records' then president Harve Pierre. While in New York, she claims she was gang-raped at a recording studio by Combs, Pierre, and a third assailant.

On February 26, 2024, producer Rodney Jones filed a lawsuit accusing Combs of sexually assaulting him during the time that he had worked for Combs, between September 2022 and November 2023. Actor Cuba Gooding Jr. was mentioned in the sexual assault lawsuit brought against Sean Combs by Rodney Jones. In May, a lawsuit by model Crystal McKinney accused Combs of sexually assaulting her in 2003. On May 23, 2024, April Lampros sued Combs in New York State court alleging battery, sexual assault, and negligent infliction of emotional distress between 1994 into the 2000s.

On June 10, 2024, Derrick Lee Cardello-Smith, a convicted felon serving a prison sentence, filed a lawsuit in Lenawee County, Michigan, alleging that Combs had sexually assaulted him at a party in 1997. Due to Combs' failure to appear in court on the trial date of September 9, Cardello-Smith was awarded a default judgment of $100 million, while a temporary restraining order was issued against Combs preventing him from selling any assets. Both were overturned on September 18 by the same judge, who ruled the lawsuit was not properly served to Combs and that it was not likely the plaintiff would prevail on the merits of the case due to the statute of limitations for sexual assault.

On September 10, 2024, Making the Band's Dawn Richard filed a lawsuit against Combs alleging sex trafficking, sexual assault, sexual battery, false imprisonment, and more. In her complaint, Richard also confirmed she was a witness to the claims made in Ventura's lawsuit. On September 24, 2024, Thalia Graves filed a lawsuit against Combs alleging he and his head of security drugged her, bound her, and raped her in 2001 when she was 25 years old, and recorded the incident. On September 27, a Florida model filed a lawsuit, as a Jane Doe, alleging Combs drugged, sexually assaulted, and impregnated her. Although she wound up having a miscarriage, she claimed that Combs' then-girlfriend, rapper Yung Miami, pressured her to have an abortion.

On October 1, 2024, The Washington Post reported that a team of lawyers would be filing as many as 122 more lawsuits against Combs and persons related to Combs, covering assaults that took place during the 2000s and 2010s. Plaintiffs, twenty-five of whom were minors at the time of the alleged incidents, are both male and female. Tony Buzbee, one of the attorneys on the team, said most of the alleged assaults took place in New York State. Half of the alleged victims say they had reported the assault to police, to a doctor, or to the FBI. Some claim to have been drugged or offered hush money. Additional potential defendants other than Combs were also to be named in the lawsuits: "The names that we're going to name, assuming our investigators confirm and corroborate what we've been told, are names that will shock you", Buzbee stated at a press conference in Houston. "I'm talking here about not just the cowardly but complicit bystanders, that is those people that we know watched this behavior occur and did nothing. And I'm talking about the people that participated, encouraged it, egged it on. They know who they are." Buzbee filed the first six of these lawsuits in New York federal court on October 13, 2024. Andrew Van Arsdale of the AVA Law Group, which is working with Buzbee, said they have heard from some 3 thousand people with abuse allegations against Combs, and the team is currently actively examining another 100 potential cases. Erica Wolff, a member of Combs' legal team, told the BBC that Combs "looks forward to proving his innocence and vindicating himself in court, where the truth will be established based on evidence, not speculation". On October 14, Combs faced six additional lawsuits from accusers. On October 21, seven new lawsuits from accusers were filed against Combs. On October 28, two lawsuits were filed alleging that Combs drugged and sexually assaulted a 10-year-old boy in a New York hotel room, in 2005, following a planned audition, and that Combs and a bodyguard sexually assaulted a 17-year-old male during an audition for the MTV reality show Making the Band in 2008, which was executive produced and hosted by Combs.

In December 2024, Combs and Jay-Z were accused in a civil lawsuit of raping a 13-year-old girl at an MTV Video Music Awards after-party in 2000. The lawsuit against Combs and Jay-Z was dropped in February 2025. In the same month, Combs was accused of raping and sexually assaulting three men, of committing sexual battery against a former male employee, and of drugging and sexually assaulting a woman, in separate suits against him. In January 2025, Combs was sued by a woman who claimed that he had sexually assaulted her when she was a 16-year-old babysitter in September 2000. Rolling Stone reported that there were over forty lawsuits against Combs.

A lawsuit filed by Austrian television presenter Kathi Steininger was dismissed because the alleged rape occurred outside the United States.

== Criminal prosecution ==
On March 25, 2024, the Department of Homeland Security raided Combs' properties in Los Angeles, New York, and Miami using a Southern District of New York search warrant in connection with an unspecified ongoing investigation. Federal agents confiscated computers and other electronic devices. Recovered in the raids were narcotics like Ketamine, Ecstasy, GHB, three illegally modified AR-15 rifles, and "more than 1,000 bottles of baby oil and lubricant".

According to the Miami Herald, federal agents questioned Combs at Opa-Locka Airport on March 25, 2024. The agents seized a number of electronic devices before allowing him to leave for his planned vacation to Antigua and Barbuda.

Combs was arrested by U.S. Homeland Security investigators in Manhattan on September 16, 2024, after a grand jury indicted him. He was charged with sex trafficking and racketeering. Combs pleaded not guilty in his first court appearance at a Manhattan federal courthouse on September 17, 2024. During this court appearance, U.S. Magistrate Judge Robyn Tarnofsky denied Combs bail and ordered him to remain in federal custody. On September 18, a second judge, Andrew L. Carter Jr., denied bail due to concerns about potential witness threats and intimidation, despite the offer of a $50 million bond by Combs' attorney. The defense also proposed restricted travel, restrictions on female visitors, and home detention among other conditions of release, all of which were rejected. Combs remains incarcerated at the Metropolitan Detention Center in Brooklyn.

On October 10, 2024, New York federal judge Arun Subramanian set May 5, 2025 as the starting date of Combs' trial.

On February 21, 2025, Anthony Ricco, one of Combs' defense attorneys, withdrew from the case. Ricco filed a motion in New York federal court to step down, citing an inability to continue effectively representing Combs. He did not specify reasons beyond referencing discussions with Combs' lead counsel, Marc Agnifilo. The withdrawal requires judicial approval to become official.

On July 2, 2025, Combs was found not guilty of racketeering conspiracy and sex trafficking charges, but guilty on two counts of transportation for the purposes of prostitution, in violation of the Mann Act.

On October 3, 2025, Combs was sentenced to four years and two months in prison and a $500,000 fine, followed by five years of supervised release. He is currently incarcerated at the low-security Federal Correctional Institution, Fort Dix in New Jersey.

== Industry and company responses ==
On November 24, 2023, Macy's announced that they were pulling all Sean John clothing from their department and online stores, effectively ending their partnership with Combs. Four days later, Combs stepped down as chairman of Revolt TV. Tsuri, Nuudii System, Fulaba, and House of Takura all ended their affiliations with Combs' e-commerce business, Empower Global.

Hulu cancelled production for a planned reality series that centered on Combs and his family. A spokesperson for Hulu's parent company, The Walt Disney Company, said that "the show was in the nascent stages and is not currently in production". On December 23, 2023, the Recording Academy decided to "re-evaluate" Combs' invitation to the 66th Annual Grammy Awards on February 4, 2024. He was nominated for Best Progressive R&B Album for The Love Album: Off the Grid, but did not attend the ceremony.

During a live performance in November 2023, pop singer Kesha changed the opening lyric of her 2009 single "TiK ToK" from "wake up in the morning feeling like P. Diddy" to "wake up in the morning feeling like just me". At a Coachella performance with Reneé Rapp in April 2024, Kesha changed the lyric to "wake up in the morning like fuck P. Diddy". She has also stated in interviews that she plans to permanently perform the Coachella version of the lyrics, and has encouraged fans to learn this version of the song to sing along at concerts.

By April 2024, Combs' radio airplay and streaming figures decreased by 88% and 51.8% respectively. In May 2024, Australian radio personality Stav Davidson and Sussan Ley, deputy leader of the Australian Opposition, called for a boycott or permanent ban of Combs' music from streaming services and radio. Fitness brand Peloton Interactive removed Combs' music from its fitness classes and playlists, after initially announcing that it would "pause" the usage of his music.

On June 7, 2024, Howard University announced that it was revoking Combs' honorary doctorate. They also returned his $1 million donation and terminated his pledge agreement. Nine days later, New York City Mayor Eric Adams announced the rescinding of Combs' key to the city, which he had been awarded in September 2023. On June 28, 2024, the offices of Miami-Dade County district attorney Katherine Fernandez Rundle revoked Diddy Day, a city-wide holiday in Miami Beach, Florida inaugurated in his honor on October 13, 2016.

As of late 2024, a few radio stations, like Boston's Jam'n 94.5 (owned by iHeartMedia) and California's 93.5 KDAY (owned by Meruelo Group), had pulled off Diddy's music, while others, such as syndicated iHeartMedia, would allow each station to decide.

=== Documentaries ===
Throughout 2024, TMZ released a docu-series, centering on the allegations, titled the Downfall of Diddy.

Also in September, Netflix announced the development of a television documentary miniseries centering on the allegations, which would be executive produced by rapper 50 Cent, who stated that proceeds from the project would be going to victims of sexual assault and rape. Originally titled Diddy Do It, Sean Combs: The Reckoning was released on December 2, 2025.

On January 3, 2025, Peacock released a trailer to a documentary, also centering on these allegations, titled Diddy: The Making of a Bad Boy. The documentary was released on January 14, 2025, and included singer Al B. Sure! speaking on camera about Kim Porter for the first time.

On January 28, 2025, Investigation Discovery released a five-part documentary series titled The Fall of Diddy.

== Trial ==
On April 18, 2025, a bid by Combs' lawyers to delay the trial for two months was denied by the judge because the request was submitted too close to the start date. On May 5, Combs' trial began in the United States District Court for the Southern District of New York in Manhattan, with the process of jury selection. Opening statements and witness testimony began on May 12, with Cassie Ventura first on the stand for the prosecution. On May 22, Judge Subramanian said the trial should "wrap up" by July 4. Both the prosecution and defense teams would conclude their cases on June 24, 2025. Prosecutor Christy Slavik would present her closing arguments on June 26. The defense closing argument and prosecution rebuttal would then take on June 27, with the case now expected to go to the jury on June 30. On July 2, 2025, Combs was acquitted on the three more serious charges involving two counts of sex trafficking and one RICO charge, but would be convicted on the two lesser charges involving transportation to engage in prostitution charges. Following the verdict, he was denied bail and required to remain in prison pending his sentence. On October 3, Combs was sentenced to 4 years and 2 months in prison and a $500,000 fine.

== Support for Combs ==
Around May 5, supporters of Combs would display their support by wearing black shirts with "Free Puff" or "Free $Diddy" printed in white. According to a female Free Diddy protestor interview, she was told that she would be paid $20 an hour by someone passing out the shirts if she wore them.

Rapper Kanye West expressed his support for Combs by tweeting "Free Puff [Combs]" on February 6. He continued to praise Combs as a "hero" and "idol" amongst a series of racist and pro-Adolf Hitler tweets. West claimed that allegations directed at Combs were part of a conspiracy theory perpetrated by Hollywood "elites", and urged President Donald Trump to "free Combs." Combs thanked West, calling him his "brother." West later released a video call with King Combs, Sean Combs' son, with a caption reading "A son to his Dad for every Son who had his Dad locked up write or wrong [sic]". Young Thug has also expressed support for Combs; he called Kid Cudi a "rat" for testifying against Combs and called for Combs' freedom during a livestream with Adin Ross.

== See also ==
- Diddy parties
- #MeToo movement; allegations against figures in the music industry
- Piers Morgan Uncensored § Criticism
- R. Kelly sexual abuse cases
- "She Knows" (J. Cole song) § Controversy
