= Diddy parties =

American series of parties hosted by Sean Combs

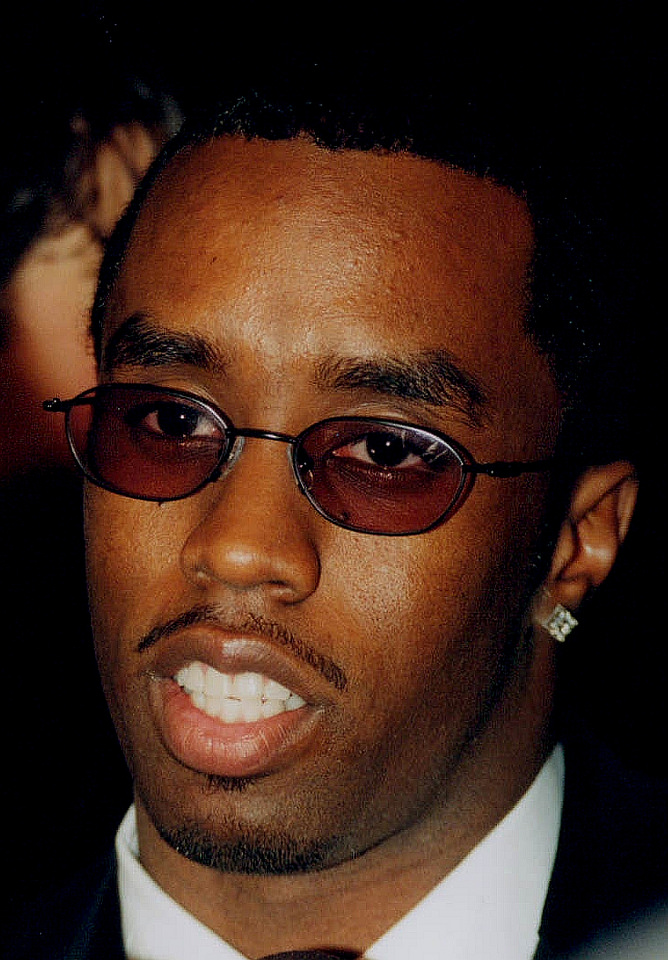
Sean Combs in 2000

"Diddy parties" and "freak-offs" are a collective name for the parties hosted from the 1990s to the 2020s by American rapper and record producer Sean Combs, known professionally as Diddy (formerly Puff Daddy and P. Diddy). (Note: Combs adopted the stage name "Puff Daddy" in 1996 for his first release and would later change his name to "P. Diddy" in 2001 and to "Diddy" in 2005. This article uses "Combs" for consistency.)

The initial series, known as White Parties, were a series of parties hosted by Combs between 1998 and 2009. Many were held at Combs's house in East Hampton, New York. The 2006 White Party was held in Saint-Tropez in the south of France; the final White Party—the final Diddy party of any sort—took place in Beverly Hills, California. White Parties typically began during the day and lasted until the early hours of the next day. The events were often sponsored by prominent brands that gave away merchandise. Numerous celebrities attended one or more of the parties, including Justin Bieber, Jennifer Lopez, Mariah Carey, and Paris Hilton. Beyoncé and Jay-Z released new music at these parties. Held in private mansions, luxury hotels, and occasionally on yachts, they were characterized by their over-the-top nature—featuring everything from celebrity DJ sets to intimate performances.

According to The New York Times, the choice of the color white as part of a strictly-enforced dress code was intended by Combs to strip away people's image and put them on the same level, creating "a certain pristine simplicity". Combs said that the parties were also intended to break down generational and racial barriers among people. The BBC said the parties brought together "East Hampton's old-money elite and the rising stars of hip hop".

After Combs's 2024 indictment on sex trafficking charges, some party attendees, including columnist R. Couri Hay, revisited their experiences at the parties—also termed freak-offs—in light of the sexual misconduct allegations against Combs, with the parties becoming a focal point of lawsuits and criminal investigations against Combs, ranging from drugging and coercing women into sexual acts to physical assault and intimidation. Elements revisited include their opulence and secrecy, and performances that "blurred the line between entertainment and exploitation". While some attendees viewed these parties as glamorous, others have since described them as exploitative and coercive.

== White Parties ==
Between 1998 and 2009, Combs held lavish annual "White Parties" that were known for their high-profile guests and dress code of white clothing. Combs has been compared to Jay Gatsby, and said in 2001, "Have I read The Great Gatsby? I am the Great Gatsby!"

1998: Combs hosted the inaugural White Party on Labor Day 1998 with about 1000 guests at his house in East Hampton, New York. Paris Hilton described it as iconic, saying "everyone was there". Martha Stewart said Combs was "very handsome in white" and described the all-white dress as a "stunning sight". Guests who did not wear white were sent home to change. Monique P. Yazigi wrote in The New York Times that 1998 would be remembered as the "Summer of Puff Daddy in the Hamptons".

1999: In 1999, the second annual White Party was initially denied a permit from the East Hampton board. Combs threatened to sue. The board offered permission with certain constraints regarding guests, traffic, and time. Among those in attendance were Donald Trump, Chevy Chase and his children, and an uninvited crasher that Combs permitted to stay.

2000: At the 2000 White Party, Brett Ratner, Russell Simmons, Matthew Broderick, Sarah Jessica Parker, NSYNC and Salman Rushdie were among the guests. East Hampton required a 9:30 p.m. end time, but police issued a summons at 8:45 p.m. due to noise complaints from Combs' next door neighbor, who said she had a problem with Combs "just about every weekend".

2003: Howard Stern and Kelly Osbourne were among the attendees at Diddy's 2003 Absolut White Party in East Hampton, New York.

2004: On July 4, 2004, Combs held his sixth annual White Party at "PlayStation 2 Estate" in Bridgehampton, New York, as a fundraiser for his voter turnout efforts. Combs promised to make the 2004 U.S. presidential election "the hottest, most sexiest thing ever". Combs arrived carrying an original copy of the Declaration of Independence as his "date". He said, "No one would ever expect a young black man to be coming to a party with the Declaration of Independence, but I got it ... And I promise not to spill champagne on it". Norman Lear, who had purchased it in 2000, lent Combs the Declaration but hired three armed guards to chaperone it throughout the night.

This marked "a new level of fortune and braggadocio" for Combs, NPR wrote. Combs was appearing in A Raisin in the Sun on Broadway at the time, and flew to the party in two helicopters with the cast after a matinée performance. A group of spoken-word poets performed an interpretation of the Declaration of Independence. Guests included Tyson Beckford, Elton Brand, Mary J. Blige, Aretha Franklin, Paris Hilton, LL Cool J, Betsey Johnson, Lennox Lewis, Lisa Ling, Denise Rich, and Al Sharpton.

One of Diddy’s 2004 Miami parties, where photographs showed food served on the body of a naked woman, included Will Smith and Bruce Willis as guests.

2005: In 2005, the White Party took place in Miami and featured a plexiglass box of eight live penguins. The event planning company worked with 250 subcontractors for the party.

2006: The 2006 White Party was held at Nikki Beach, a club on the beach at Saint-Tropez on the Côte d'Azur in the south of France.

2007: The 2007 edition was held at Combs's house in East Hampton on September 2, and was titled "The Real White Party". It was held with Cîroc and reportedly cost $1 million with 300 guests in attendance. Guests included Mariah Carey, Lil' Kim, Star Jones, Busta Rhymes, and Russell Simmons.

2009: The 2009 party was called "Malaria No More" and held in Beverly Hills, California, in aid of an anti-malaria charity. It was the last Diddy Party staged by Combs. The parties were ended as Combs was spending less time in the Hamptons. Representatives for Combs described the parties as "iconic, a true convergence of hip-hop, Hollywood and Black excellence ... an endless stream of people vying to attend". Guests included Russell Brand, Mariah Carey, Estelle, Jonah Hill, Lil' Kim, Ashton Kutcher, Demi Moore, Marla Maples and her daughter Tiffany Trump, and Donald Trump. Attractions included stilt walkers and dancers in giant plastic balloons. Kutcher himself swung across a swimming pool on a giant swing. Vanity Fair felt that the highlight of the party was when Chris Brown was spotted kissing Amber Rose, having earlier arrived at the party with Teyana Taylor.

== Freak-offs ==
The term freak-offs began to see widespread use to refer to the extravagant parties organized by Combs following the sexual misconduct allegations against Combs, including their association with illicit activities, including drug use, non-consensual sexual encounters, and physical violence. The term was first used in the early 2000s to describe his private, exclusive parties. It usually refers to reports that the events included explicit sexual activities and were sometimes filmed, allegedly for personal use.

Testimonies describe instances of abuse, including kidnapping, threats of violence, and non-consensual recording of intimate acts. Legal filings against Combs accused him of "fostering an environment of unchecked hedonism" where consent and safety were disregarded.

During federal investigations into Combs's alleged sex trafficking and racketeering activities, authorities seized over 1,000 bottles of baby oil from his residences.

== Reputation and significance ==
In 2024, Jesse McKinley and Sarah Maslin Nir wrote in The New York Times that in the 2000s "few events held the cultural cachet" that his White Parties did and that Combs would be "invariably toasting the scene with a glass of Cîroc vodka, and welcoming comparisons of his revels to those of lore". In a 2024 article for CNN, Lisa Respers France wrote that there had once been a time when an invite to the parties was one of the hottest summer tickets and that the parties were the peak of his cultural influence. The parties saw a broad range of social and cultural elites socialising together as "veteran celebrities mixed with of-the-moment stars and the high-society set at gatherings that often had civic-minded causes" according to the New York Times. Vanity Fair felt that the parties had "started to lose [their] fizzle" by 2009. The writer Steven Gaines said that initially the residents of the Hamptons thought "the first party was the end of the world ... They were afraid of a noisy showbiz crowd and thought it was going to be an invasion, and it turned out not to be". Combs's neighbors in the Hamptons were pacified with limousine rides and complimentary meals at expensive restaurants to abate noise complaints.

The aftermath of Combs's arrest and indictment on allegations of sexual misconduct in late 2024 caused a reappraisal of Combs's parties for the participants and staff. A statement from Combs said that it was disappointing to "see the media and social commentators twist these cultural moments into something they were not ... Shaming celebrities who attended, taking video clips and photos out of context, and trying to link these events to false allegations is simply untrue". In 1999 Combs had said that "They don't want me to throw the parties no more ... But we ain't going to stop. We gonna keep on having fun. Bringing people together from all walks of life" and that "You gonna hear about my parties ... They gonna be shutting them down, they gonna probably be arresting me, doing all types of crazy things just because we want to have a good time".

Combs's arrest and the revelations about his parties caused a great deal of media attention. Celebrities who attended his parties, including Leonardo DiCaprio and Mariah Carey, have been the subject of speculation and have had to publicly address their associations with the rapper. The parties, once seen as glamorous events, have come under new scrutiny, with the focus on allegations of abuse and inappropriate behavior. High-profile figures associated with past events include Rihanna, Nicki Minaj, Kim Kardashian, Kanye West, Snoop Dogg, Beyoncé, Shawn Wayans, Tommy Lee, Usher, and Drake. DiCaprio, who was a frequent guest at these parties, publicly distanced himself from Combs after the allegations were made public, stating that he had not had contact with the rapper in years, and that he never participated in the illegal activities.

=== Film and television ===
Several social media posts and newspaper articles suggest that 2004 action-comedy film White Chicks might have been inspired by real-life events or individuals present at Combs's infamous parties, mentioning theories linking the film's exaggerated portrayal of elite lifestyles to personalities observed at these gatherings. Marlon Wayans, one of the creators and stars of White Chicks, in Shannon Sharpe's Club Shay Shay podcast, acknowledged attending Combs's parties but claimed to leave early, distancing himself from any questionable activities. Other productions, such as Madagascar, The Simpsons, and South Park, are also cited as examples of media that subtly alluded to or parodied the lifestyle and controversies surrounding Combs. The phrase "Diddy parties" is sometimes used as a euphemism for any type of party where sexual actions happen.

== See also ==
- Sean Combs sexual misconduct allegations
- Trial of Sean Combs
