= Pushin P =

2022 single by Gunna and Future

Song by Gunna and Future featuring Young Thug

from the album DS4Ever
- Released: January 7, 2022
- Studio: Art Basel, Miami
- Genre: Hip hop; trap
- Length: 2:16
- Label: YSL; 300
- Songwriters: Sergio Kitchens; Nayvadius Wilburn; Jeffery Williams; Wesley Glass; Juke Wong
- Producers: Wheezy; Juke Wong

Music video
- Pushin P on YouTube

"Pushin P" (stylized as "pushin P") is a song by American rappers Gunna and Future featuring fellow American rapper Young Thug. It was released on January 7, 2022, as the second track from the former's third studio album DS4Ever. The "hypnotic", alliterative track finds the trio rapping about "pushin p", which is a phrase popularized by Gunna that means to "keep it real". The track was regarded by some critics as a standout from DS4Ever, and became the album's highest-charting track, debuting at number seven on the Billboard Hot 100.

== Background ==
With the song's release, the phrase "pushin P" became a trend online, with social media users posting blue emojis, and the context being that either something is "P", or it is not. This was developed through Gunna posting about "pushing P" online, prior to the song's release; "P" stands for "Pimp" or “Playa”, meaning to "keep it real". Gunna detailed that when something is not "P", it has negative connotations, and vice versa. He also stated that for him it was initially a substitution for the word "pleas", however its definition is open to interpretation, as Gunna clarified: "P means paperwork, too. You can be pushing this P with paper". He further explained the slight difference between "kicking P" and "pushing P": "If you're in this [mansion] and it's rented, then you're kicking P. But if you buy this shit and you own it, then you're really pushing P". A week after DS4Ever's release, Gunna kept the momentum of the trend going, changing the title of his Drake collaboration from "Pussy Power" to "P Power". According to Complex's Eric Skelton, although the phrase was popularized "in the mainstream" by Gunna, it had been used as a term in American regions like the Bay Area and Texas for years. After some Bay Area natives accused Gunna of "stealing" the term, he seemingly responded, claiming that his father introduced him to the saying. In the 2023 YSL RICO trial, Brian Steel, Young Thug's defense attorney, stated that "pushin P" stands for "pushing positivity."

== Composition ==
"Pushin P" is a "hypnotic" track that sees the rappers delivering "intoxicating" flows, chanting "numb and muddy good-life fatalism over downtuned violin-hums and understated drum-spatters and eerie synth-tinkles". The song contains similar alliteration; lines about pushing things that start with the letter P. The Focus's Bruno Cooke noted how some words are deliberately misspelled, for instance the line "She not a lesbian, for P, she turn Pesbian". Cooke opined: "Overall, it's pretty clear that, at least in the context of the song, 'P' stands for a vulgar slang word for a woman's genitals". Furthermore, the song consists of various references to sexual acts and illegal drugs. Complex's Eric Skelton opined that the song is "basically just a chance for Gunna, Future, and Thug to pack a ludicrous amount of P-words into a single song", while Uproxx's Aaron Williams said the trio employs "a slurred, foggy take on the old-school in-and-out, pass-the-mic flow". Exclaim!'s Michael Di Gennaro labeled the song "dark and brooding", calling it a display "of a master at work, someone who knows exactly the type of emotional reaction he wants to get from his audience and how to reach it".

== Critical reception ==
Complex's Jessica McKinney praised Future for being "the glue that keeps the track together, delivering ad-libs and plenty of swagger on the chorus". Stereogum's Tom Breihan called it a standout track on the album, stating that the song "sounds like blissfully plummeting down an abyss, secure in the feeling that you'll never hit the bottom". Tomás Mier of Rolling Stone also named it one of the standout tracks on DS4Ever. Jordan Darville of The Fader called it one of the best tracks on the album, while quipping: "There's still no explanation of Thug's 'I just fucked a cup of water' bar, but some things are too magical to be fully explained". Revolt's Jon Powell called it a "hard-hitting number". Consequence's Eddie Fu named it the rap song of the week, highlighting Future and Thug's "toxic bars over icy production from Juke Wong and Wheezy". Fu also called Thug's "fucked a cup of water" line bizarre. In their album review, Pitchfork's Alphonse Pierre wrote: "as forced as Gunnas new 'pushin' P' motto may be, the Wheezy instrumental it's laid over is so ominous it'll make the hairs stick up on the back of your neck. The middle section of the song, where Gunna raps gibberish for a moment, is the most fun he's having on the entire album". With the album's release, Billboard's Jason Lipshutz said the song "arrives early in the track list as a de facto breakout single from the project".

The song received two nominations at the 65th Annual Grammy Awards: Best Rap Performance and Best Rap Song.

== Commercial performance ==
For the week of January 22, 2022, "Pushin P" debuted at number seven of the Billboard Hot 100, garnering 22.5 million streams and debuting at number two on the Streaming Songs chart. It marked Gunna's first top 10 debut, and his third top 10 entry, following "Drip Too Hard" and "Lemonade" with Internet Money. Future and Young Thug also earned their fifth and sixth Hot 100 top 10s, respectively, and their second shared top 10, after Drake's chart-topping "Way 2 Sexy".

== Music video ==
The music video was released on January 12, 2022, directed by Caleb Jermale. It finds the rappers giving examples of what it means to "push p", as they are inside a club, luxury stores, a mansion, as they board private jets, and drop large amounts of cash at a strip club. HipHopDX's Michael Saponara called the visual "lavish", noting how it follows the trio "taking over a South Beach party, shopping at Miami's designer store district with eye candy on their hip, and pouring up some lean without a worry in the world". Actor Demetrius "Lil Meech" Flenory Jr. also makes a cameo appearance.

== Charts ==
=== Weekly charts ===
Weekly chart performance for "Pushin P"
Chart (2022)	Peak position
Australia (ARIA)	19
Austria (Ö3 Austria Top 40)	28
Canada Hot 100 (Billboard)	10
Czech Republic Airplay (ČNS IFPI)	66
Czech Republic Singles Digital (ČNS IFPI)	67
Germany (GfK)	34
Global 200 (Billboard)	10
Iceland (Tónlistinn)	5
Ireland (IRMA)	27
Lithuania (AGATA)	10
Netherlands (Single Top 100)	82
New Zealand (Recorded Music NZ)	16
Slovakia (Singles Digitál Top 100)	29
South Africa Streaming (TOSAC)	11
Sweden (Sverigetopplistan)	96
Switzerland (Schweizer Hitparade)	23
UK Singles (Official Charts)	28
UK Independent (Official Charts)	5
UK Hip Hop/R&B (Official Charts)	12
US Billboard Hot 100	7
US Hot R&B/Hip-Hop Songs (Billboard)	2
US Rhythmic Airplay (Billboard)	4

=== Year-end charts ===
2022 year-end chart performance for "Pushin P"
Chart (2022)	Position
Canada (Canadian Hot 100)	74
Global 200 (Billboard)	146
US Billboard Hot 100	48
US Hot R&B/Hip-Hop Songs (Billboard)	13
US Rhythmic (Billboard)	29

== Certifications ==
Certifications for "Pushin P"
Region	Certification	Certified units/sales
Canada (Music Canada)	3× Platinum	240,000^{‡}
New Zealand (RMNZ)	Platinum	30,000^{‡}
South Africa (RISA)	Platinum	40,000^{‡}
Switzerland (IFPI Switzerland)	Gold	10,000^{‡}
United Kingdom (BPI)	Silver	200,000^{‡}
United States (RIAA)	2× Platinum	2,000,000^{‡}
^{‡} Sales+streaming figures based on certification alone.
