= Leibell =

Leibell is a surname. Notable people with the surname include:

- Vincent Leibell (born 1946), American politician
- Vincent L. Leibell (judge) (1883–1968), American judge
