= Trial of Sean Combs =

2025 criminal court case

United States v. Combs
- Court: United States District Court for the Southern District of New York
- Full case name: United States of America v. Sean Combs, a/k/a "Puff Daddy," a/k/a "P. Diddy," a/k/a "Diddy," a/k/a "PD," a/k/a "Love"
- Started: May 5, 2025
- Decided: July 2, 2025
- Docket nos.: 1:24-CR-00542
- Verdict: Guilty: Transportation to engage in prostitution (2 counts); Not guilty: Racketeering conspiracy; Sex trafficking by force, fraud, or coercion

Court membership
- Judge sitting: Arun Subramanian

United States v. Combs is a 2025 criminal case in the United States District Court for the Southern District of New York brought against American rapper and record producer Sean Combs, known professionally as Diddy (formerly Puff Daddy and P. Diddy), (Note: Combs adopted the stage name "Puff Daddy" in 1996 for his first release and would later change his name to "P. Diddy" in 2001 and to "Diddy" in 2005. See "Flashback: The nitty-gritty of how Sean Combs became Diddy". USA TODAY. This article uses "Combs" for consistency.) on charges including racketeering conspiracy, sex trafficking, and violations of the Mann Act.

On July 2, 2025, a jury found Combs not guilty of racketeering conspiracy and sex trafficking, but guilty on two counts of transportation for the purposes of prostitution. On October 3, 2025, Judge Arun Subramanian sentenced Combs to four years and two months in prison, a $500,000 fine, and five years of supervised release.

== Background ==
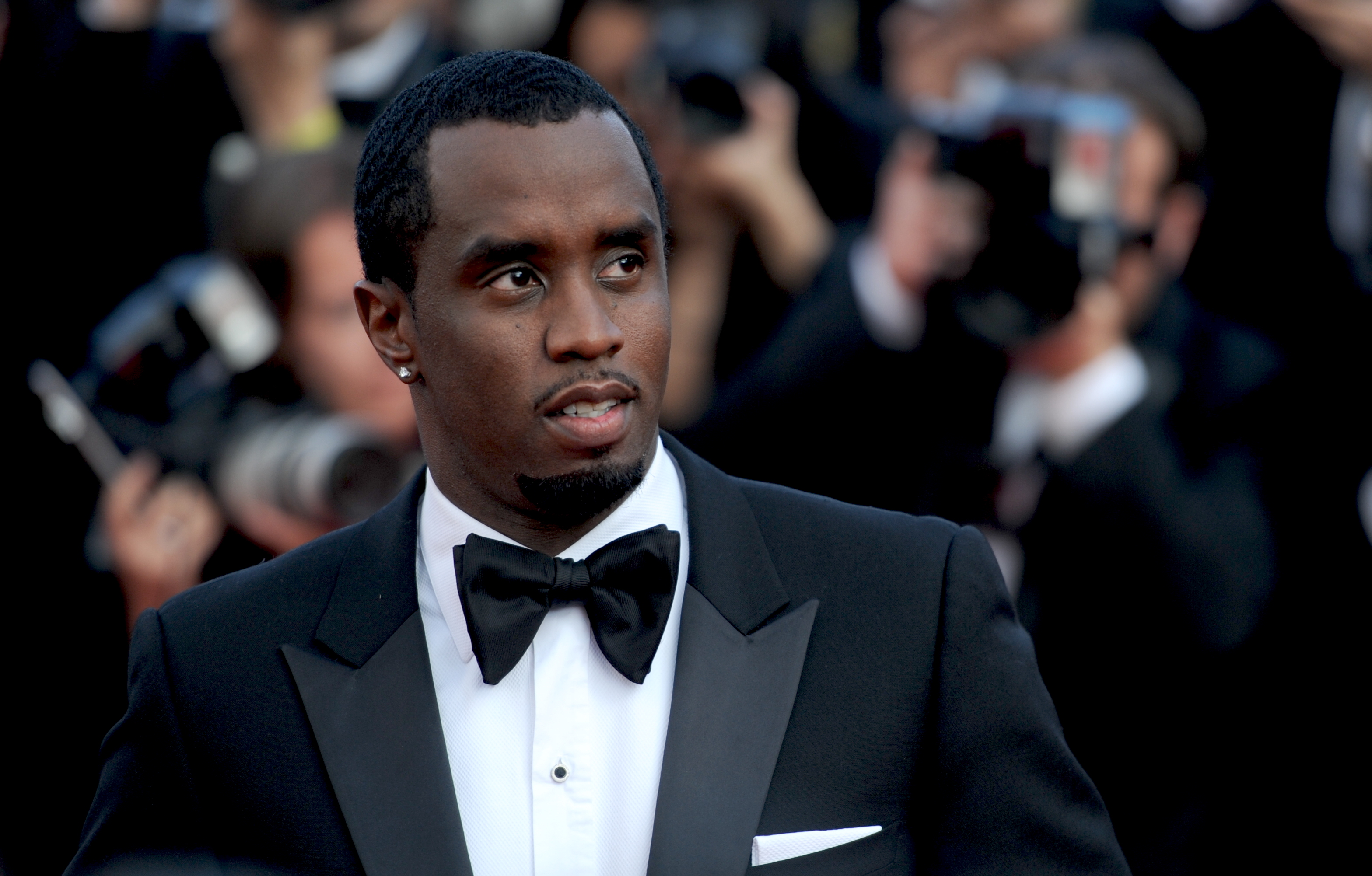
Sean Combs in 2012

From 2017 onward, there have been several civil suits brought against Combs. He has been accused of raping and sexually assaulting three men, of committing sexual battery against a former male employee, and of drugging and sexually assaulting a woman. In 2023 and 2024, accusations of sexual misconduct were made and civil suits were filed against Combs. Among the accusers and plaintiffs was the defendant's former girlfriend Cassie Ventura, who said that she had been raped, trafficked, and physically assaulted by Combs multiple times during a period of almost ten years.

== Investigation ==
On March 25, 2024, federal agents questioned Combs at the Miami–Opa Locka Executive Airport and seized a number of electronic devices before allowing him to leave for his planned vacation. The same day, Homeland Security agents raided Combs's properties in Los Angeles, New York, and Miami, confiscating computers and other electronic devices. The search found various narcotics, like ketamine, ecstasy, GHB, as well as a number of weapons, including three illegally modified AR-15 rifles, and "more than 1,000 bottles of baby oil and lubricant".

== Indictment ==
On September 16, 2024, Sean Combs was indicted by a grand jury on three counts of felonies: Racketeering Conspiracy; Sex Trafficking by Force, Fraud, or Coercion; and Transportation to Engage in Prostitution. He was arrested by U.S. Homeland Security investigators in Manhattan the same day, and jailed at the Metropolitan Detention Center in Brooklyn. During his arraignment, on September 17, Combs pleaded not guilty. Southern District of New York Judge Robyn Tarnofsky denied Combs bail and ordered that the defendant remain in federal custody. The next day, District court judge Andrew L. Carter Jr. denied the defense's appeal for bail, citing concerns for potential witness threats and intimidation. The defense claimed in its appeal, among other things, that a 2016 surveillance video clip from a hotel hallway, in which the defendant can be seen kicking and dragging Cassie Ventura, is the product of "a ten-year loving relationship" that dissolved because of Ventura's "jealousy over [the defendant's] infidelity." The judge did not accept the claim, asking, at some point, "What's love got to do with that?" In June 2025, prosecutors agreed to drop three charges involving arson, attempted kidnapping and aiding sex trafficking.

== Trial ==
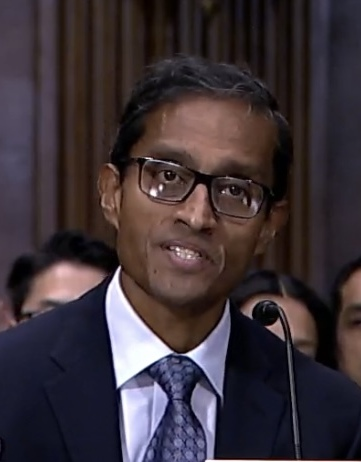
Federal Judge Arun Subramanian (pictured in 2022)

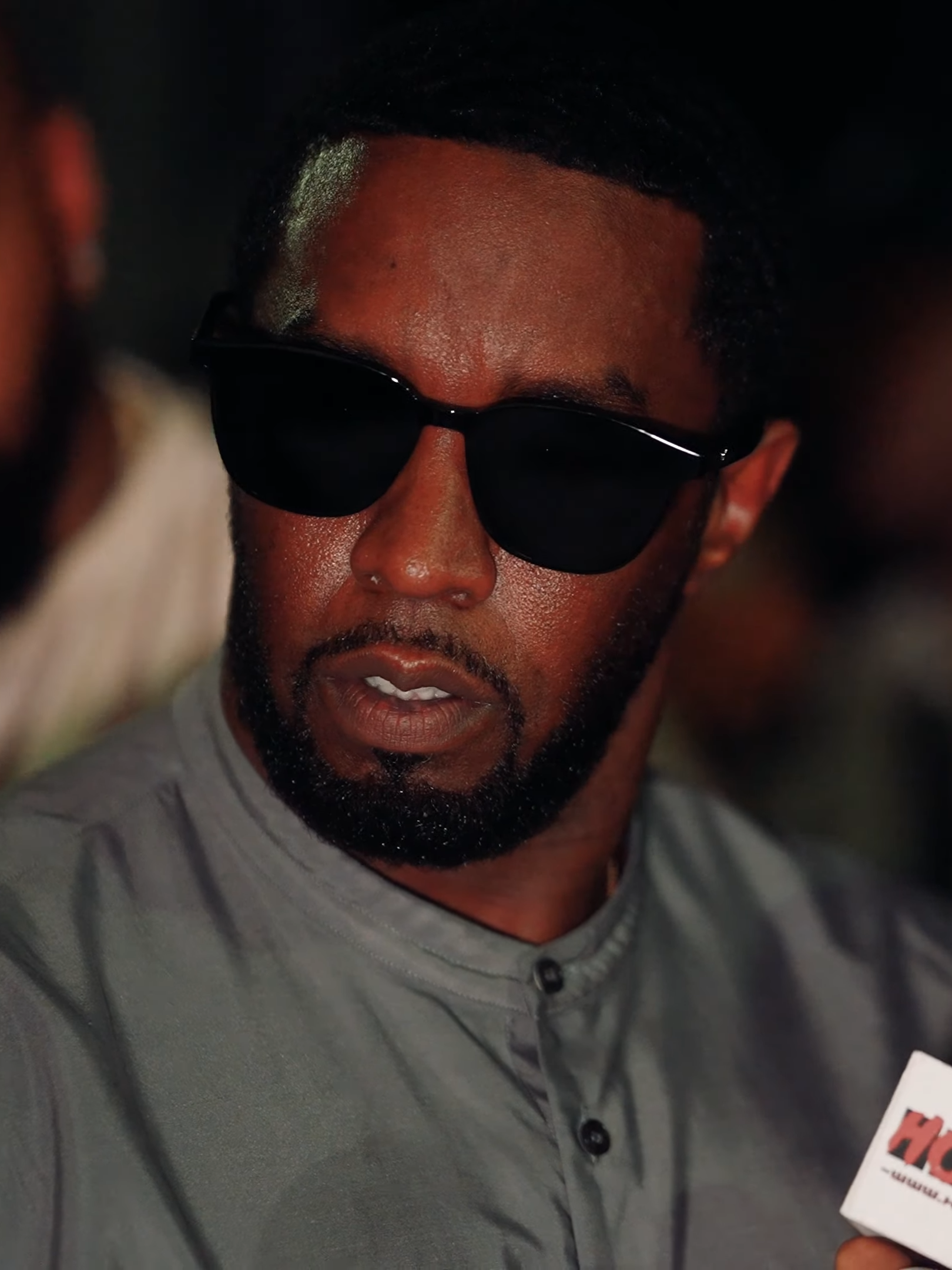
Defendant Sean "Diddy" Combs (pictured in 2023)

On May 5, 2025, the date set by Federal Judge Arun Subramanian, the trial of Sean Combs began in the Federal District Court in Lower Manhattan.

=== Jury selection ===
On May 12, 2025, the process of jury selection began. After a period of nearly a week and the examination of about one hundred prospective jurors by the judge, the prosecution, and the defense, a panel of twelve jurors and six alternates was agreed upon and selected. The jury was composed of eight men and four women, from Manhattan, the Bronx, or Westchester County, New York, between the ages of 30 and 74.

=== Opening statements ===
The prosecution said that the defendant was operating his business enterprises also for criminal purposes and specifically to carry out and cover up the crimes for which he had been indicted. The prosecution claimed Combs used his "status and power" to "violently" force two ex-girlfriends into a number of sexual acts they did not want to partake in, and that he "victimized" several of his employees through threats, kidnapping, and even sexual assault. The charges of conspiracy and racketeering involve the same activities.

The defense (Note: Combs' high-profile defense team includes attorney Brian Steel, who has successfully defended clients Jeffery "Young Thug" Williams, who faced a racketeering charge, and former district attorney Jackie Johnson, who was accused of obstruction in the hate-crime murder case of Ahmaud Arbery. See Bethea, Charles (April 28, 2025). "A Lawyer Freed Young Thug. Now He's Defending Diddy". The New Yorker. Archived from the original on July 3, 2025.) conceded that Combs "has a temper" and "can be physical" but argued that the ex-girlfriends who accuse him were all engaged in consensual, though admittedly "toxic," relationships, labeling the various statements against their client as a "money grab." The defense stated that everything about Combs' personal relationships should be considered as unrelated to his business enterprises.

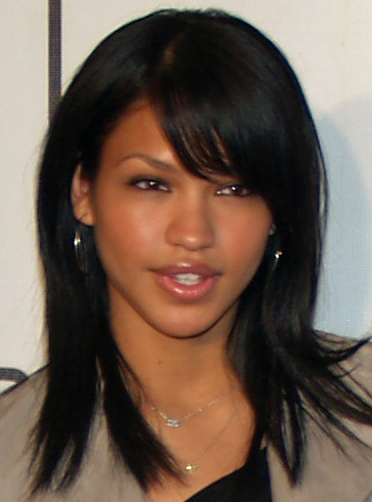
Witness and victim Cassie Ventura (pictured in 2007)

=== Witness testimony ===
Combs' former girlfriend Cassie Ventura, in four days of testimony, said that the defendant had subjected her to a decade of intense abuse. She was followed by witnesses who testified they saw the defendant commit violent acts toward Ventura, including a makeup artist and a male escort who both testified they witnessed Combs' violence. Two witnesses who worked as escorts testified they were paid by the defendant. Rapper Kid Cudi said that Combs had broken into his home and organized the firebombing of his car to avenge Cudi's relationship with Ventura. Judge Subramanian instructed the jury to disregard testimony about the destruction of fingerprint cards that occurred months after Cudi's car was set ablaze, and, after the defense, on the basis of that testimony, submitted a motion for mistrial, "immediately" rejected it. After Cudi's testimony, judge Subramanian said the trial should "wrap up" by the 4th of July.

On May 28, Ventura's former stylist testified he had witnessed the defendant being violent towards his then girlfriend, adding that he and Ventura hid "too many times to count" to avoid being "attack[ed]" by Combs, followed by a former Combs assistant, anonymously testifying as "Mia," who claimed she also was abused personally by the defendant. Defense attorney Brian Steel suggested that the former assistant is lying to the court, to which the prosecution objected, claiming that the defense's line of questioning bordered on harassment. The bench overruled the objection but assured the two parties he'd be "on the lookout for abusive conduct." A security guard from the hotel where the CCTV video captured Combs brutalizing Ventura testified on June 3 that the defendant paid him $100,000 to "bury" the clip. The prosecution has argued that the payment was a bribe and one of the underlying episodes supporting their claim that the defendant has engaged in racketeering conspiracy.

On June 5, the judge warned the defense that he might have the defendant removed from the court if he attempts again, as he saw him do, to make any facial expressions to jury members or attempts to have any interaction with or influence the jury. A woman who'd heckled the proceedings had been removed from the court two days previously.

The next day in court, a former girlfriend testifying anonymously described being pressured into "hotel nights" often lasting as long as thirty hours, during which she would have unprotected sex with male escorts in front of the defendant. In total, the prosecution called 34 witnesses over a twenty-nine day period. The defense team did not call any witnesses and, on June 24, 2025, after six weeks of testimony, both prosecution and defense teams rested their cases. When asked directly by the judge, on June 26, Combs confirmed that he would not testify in his own defense.

=== Closing arguments ===
On June 25, 2025, jury instruction arguments were concluded, and the next day, closing arguments began as the court had instructed. Assistant US attorney Christy Slavik presented her closing arguments in a five hour address, with the court then adjourning for the day. Combs' lawyer, Marc Agnifilo, presented the defense closing arguments on June 27 in an address lasting more than four hours. Afterwards, prosecutor Maurene Comey delivered her rebuttal to the defense argument. Following the prosecution's rebuttal, the jury was sent home for the weekend, with the presiding judge expected to issue instructions to the jury and allow them to begin their deliberations on June 30.

=== Verdict and sentencing ===
Jury deliberations began on June 30, 2025. The following day, the jury deliberated for twelve hours before announcing that they had arrived at a verdict on all counts except the racketeering charge.

On July 2, 2025, after three days of deliberation, the jury found Combs not guilty of racketeering conspiracy, and of sex trafficking charges involving Ventura and another, unidentified, woman. He was found guilty on two counts of transportation for the purposes of prostitution involving Ventura, another former girlfriend and male sex workers. His convictions carried a maximum prison sentence of 20 years. Prosecutors announced then that they would seek a sentence of at least 51 months (4.25 years), and requested that Judge Subramanian deny bail to Combs through sentencing. Combs's lawyers had requested a bail of $1 million, and said that if released, he would give up his passport and limit his travel to his residences and court appearances. Later that day, Subramanian denied the request for bail, noting that the defense had admitted in their arguments that Combs had a history of domestic violence. Combs thus remained in detention through his sentencing on October 3, 2025.

On September 22, 2025, the defense requested a prison sentence of 14 months. Including the time already spent in detention, this would equate to additional prison time of just over one month. On September 29, 2025, the prosecution requested Combs be sentenced to 135 months (11.25 years) in prison.

On October 3, 2025, Judge Subramanian sentenced Combs to four years and two months in federal prison, and fined him $500,000.

== Public opinions ==
Throughout the trial and after the verdict, public opinion on Combs acted as a pendulum. A third public opinion that has been circulating has resounded that the trial itself was unfair and unjust, being under the impression that accusations against Combs were false and just a ploy to “bring a strong Black man down”.

An additional reaction that has been produced from these trials is a flood of memes, including jokes about baby oil and surviving Diddy Parties, referring to the "All White" parties hosted by Combs where alleged sexual misconduct took place. The trial has inspired several Roblox games pertaining to the aforementioned jokes. These types of memes have taken over several social media platforms, including the comment sections of Instagram and TikTok, using terms such as "no Diddy" as a way to avert accusations of homosexuality.

Ian Maxwell, brother of convicted sex trafficker Ghislaine Maxwell, in a 2026 interview with the Telegraph, stated that "You have a situation where somebody like P Diddy stands in front of the same federal court on the same charge and receives four-and-a-half years for extreme physical battery, and my sister receives 20 years"

== Possible pardon ==
During a May 30 press conference, President Donald Trump was asked if he would consider pardoning Combs if found guilty. Trump said he was not closely following the trial but would "certainly look at the facts". Trump had previously been friends with Combs in their overlapping tenures as celebrities. They fell out when Trump entered politics; in 2020, Combs said that "white men like Trump need to be banished" and endorsed presidential candidate Joe Biden. On July 29, 2025, Deadline Hollywood reported that Trump was "seriously considering" pardoning Combs. In an August 1 interview with Rob Finnerty, Trump said that Combs' critical remarks about his campaign made him reluctant to issue a pardon. In January 2026, Trump said that Combs had asked him for a pardon, but he was not intending on granting one.

== See also ==
- Sean Combs: The Reckoning
- Litigation involving Jeffrey Epstein
