= Brian Steel =

American attorney (born 1965)

- Born: Queens, New York, U.S.
- Education: University of Michigan (BBA); Fordham University (JD)
- Occupation: Attorney
- Employer: Steel Law Firm
- Known for: Representing Young Thug in the YSL Records racketeering trial
- Spouse: Colette Resnik Steel

Brian Steel is an American attorney best known for representing rapper Jeffery "Young Thug" Williams in the YSL racketeering trial. Steel served as the lead defense attorney for Williams in what would become the longest trial in the history of the state of Georgia, lasting over 22 months.

Steel founded his own law firm in 1997 alongside his wife Colette, who is also an attorney. As of 2026, he has credited himself with over 300 published opinions and 45 reversals.

In February 2025, Canadian musicians PartyNextDoor and Drake's collaborative album, Some Sexy Songs 4 U, featured a song titled "Brian Steel", named after Steel.

In April 2025, Brian Steel was hired as a member of Sean "Diddy" Combs' legal team for his then-upcoming federal criminal trial on sex trafficking charges.

In March 2026, Steel joined the defense team of rapper Lil Durk in his federal murder-for-hire case.

== Early life and education ==
Steel graduated with a Bachelor of Business Administration degree from the University of Michigan in 1987 and graduated with a Juris Doctor from Fordham University School of Law in 1990.

== YSL racketeering trial ==
On May 9, 2022, Williams was arrested and charged alongside 27 other individuals in a 56-count Racketeer Influenced and Corrupt Organizations (RICO) indictment filed by Fulton County District Attorney Fani Willis. Fulton County Chief Judge Ural D. Glanville denied bond for everyone who was charged and scheduled the trial for January 9, 2023.

During the nearly two-year trial, Judge Glanville engaged in several controversial actions, including conducting multiple ex parte meetings without the defense's knowledge and imprisoning Steel for refusing to reveal his sources after the defense attorney had been informed about the meetings.

On July 15, 2024, Glanville was removed from the case. He was replaced by Superior Court Judge Paige Whitaker. On October 31, 2024, Williams pleaded guilty to the drug-related and gun-related charges and entered a no-contest plea to charges of conspiracy and participating in a street gang, allowing him to leave custody after serving over two and a half years.

== Lil Durk murder-for-hire case ==
In March 2026, Steel joined the defense team of rapper Lil Durk (Durk Banks) in his federal murder-for-hire case in the United States District Court for the Central District of California, replacing attorney Jonathan M. Brayman. Prosecutors alleged that Banks had financed and directed a 2022 plot to kill rapper Quando Rondo in retaliation for the 2020 killing of Banks's friend King Von. The shooting killed Rondo's cousin Saviay'a Robinson (Lul Pab), while Rondo survived.

During the trial, Steel challenged the credibility of cooperating witnesses, including Kacey Hester and Kavon Grant, and emphasized Grant's role in arranging the Los Angeles trip and his access to Banks's financial resources. In his closing argument, Steel argued that membership in Banks's Only the Family collective did not establish his participation in the alleged conspiracy and attacked the reliability and incentives of the government's cooperating witnesses.

On September 11, 2026, after four days of deliberations, the federal jury acquitted Banks of all charges in the murder-for-hire trial. Despite the acquittal, Banks remains in federal custody pending a separate trial on murder-related racketeering and weapons charges, which had previously been severed from the murder-for-hire case.
