= Paul A. Engelmayer =

American federal judge (born 1961)

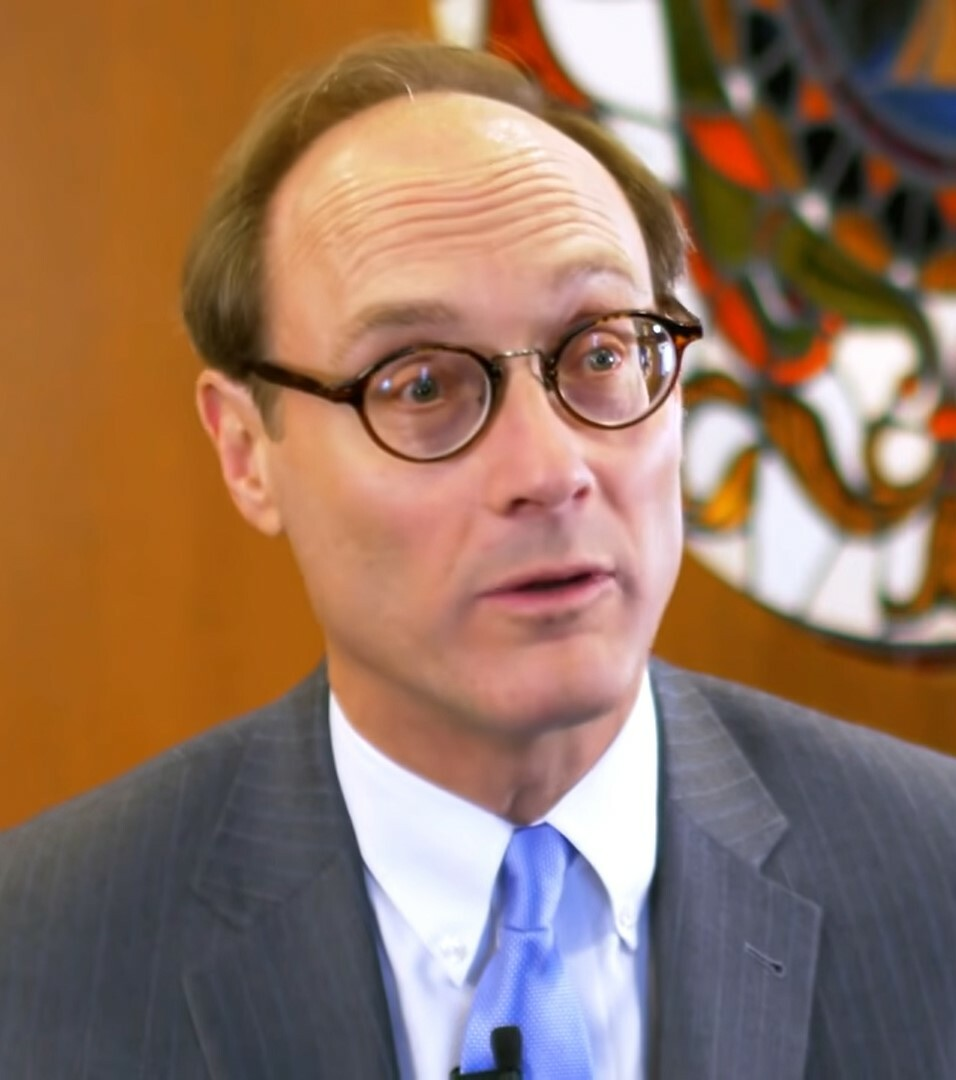
- Engelmayer in 2017

Judge of the United States District Court for the Southern District of New York
- Incumbent
- Assumed office July 27, 2011
- Appointed by: Barack Obama
- Preceded by: Gerard E. Lynch

Personal details
- Born: Paul Adam Engelmayer; 1961 (age 64–65) New York City, New York, U.S.
- Education: Harvard University (AB, JD)

Paul Adam Engelmayer (born 1961) is an American lawyer and jurist serving as a United States district judge of the U.S. District Court for the Southern District of New York. He was appointed in 2011 by President Barack Obama.

== Early life and education ==
Engelmayer was born in 1961 in New York City. He graduated from Harvard University in 1983 with a Bachelor of Arts, summa cum laude. After spending a year as a staff reporter for The Wall Street Journal, he attended Harvard Law School, where he was the treasurer of the Harvard Law Review. He graduated in 1987 with a Juris Doctor, magna cum laude.

After law school, Engelmayer was a law clerk to Chief Judge Patricia Wald of the U.S. Court of Appeals for the District of Columbia from 1987 to 1988, and then for Justice Thurgood Marshall of the U.S. Supreme Court from 1988 to 1989.

== Career ==
From 1989 to 1994, Engelmayer served as a federal prosecutor for the United States Attorney's Office for the Southern District of New York. He served as an assistant United States attorney from 1989 to 1994, and as the Deputy Chief Appellate Attorney in 1994.

From 1994 to 1996, Engelmayer served as an assistant to the United States Solicitor General Drew S. Days III in Washington D.C. In that role, he argued four cases before the U.S. Supreme Court. As of taking the bench, he had argued over 20 appellate cases.

In 1996, Engelmayer returned to the United States Attorney's Office in Manhattan, serving as the Chief of the Major Crimes Unit. He led the prosecution of Lawrence X. Cusack III, who created and sold $7 million worth of forged documents claiming that President John F. Kennedy paid hush money to conceal a supposed affair with Marilyn Monroe. Engelmayer also received the U.S. Attorney's Director's Award for Superior Performance in 1998 in connection with his prosecution of William F. Duker, a New York City lawyer who defrauded the FDIC and the Resolution Trust Corporation of $1.4 million in overbillings. Engelmayer and Lewis Liman, a future colleague on the Southern District of New York bench, also prosecuted three defendants for a scheme to extort $40 million from the actor Bill Cosby by using threats to publicly claim that one of them was Cosby's illegitimate daughter.

In 2000, Engelmayer joined the law firm Wilmer Cutler Pickering Hale and Dorr in Manhattan as a partner. He was the partner in charge of the New York office from 2005 until he was appointed as a federal judge in 2011.

Engelmayer is an elected member of the American Law Institute. He has lectured or taught at numerous law schools and professional conferences. He is a trustee of the Harvard Law Review. In a 2001 Wall Street Journal op-ed, he discussed the challenges prosecutors investigating President Bill Clinton's pardons of Marc Rich and others faced. In a keynote speech in 2015, he called on Congress to pass an insider trading law.

=== Federal judicial service ===
On February 2, 2011, President Barack Obama nominated Engelmayer to fill the judicial seat vacated by Judge Gerard E. Lynch, who was elevated to the United States Court of Appeals for the Second Circuit. The American Bar Association rated Engelmayer as Unanimously Well Qualified. On March 16, Engelmayer attended a hearing before the Senate Judiciary Committee. On March 31, Senator Charles Grassley placed Engelmayer's nomination on hold, along with two other nominations. Grassley later lifted the holds, and the Senate Judiciary Committee referred Engelmayer's nomination to the full Senate. On July 26, the Senate confirmed Engelmayer by a 98–0 vote. He received his commission on July 27, 2011.

==== Notable civil cases and rulings ====
===== NYC subway advertisements =====
In 2012, in American Freedom Defense Initiative v. Metropolitan Transit Authority, Engelmayer held that the MTA violated the First Amendment in refusing to allow a pro-Israel advertisement to appear on New York City subways and buses. The plaintiff advocacy organization had sought to place, in response to ads it viewed as anti-Israel, an ad that read: "In any war between the civilized man and the savage, support the civilized man" and "Support Israel. Defeat Jihad." The MTA blocked the ad based on a policy banning ads that demeaned people based on specified characteristics, including race, color, religion, and national origin. Engelmayer held that the ad was protected political speech and that, because the MTA's demeaning-speech policy was selective, banning such speech aimed only at certain categories of people, it was content-based without justification. The MTA allowed the ad to run, with a disclaimer.

===== Emergency rescue of AIG =====
In 2012, in Starr Int’l Co. vs. Federal Reserve Bank of N.Y., Engelmayer dismissed multi-billion-dollar damages claims brought against the Federal Reserve Bank of New York by a major stockholder in American International Group, Inc. The state-law claims, for breach of fiduciary duty, arose from FRBNY's exercise of emergency rescue powers during the 2008 financial crisis. Engelmayer held that the claims were federally preempted and that the plaintiff had failed to plead that FRBNY had taken control of AIG.

===== Bridge and tunnel discounts =====
In 2013, Engelmayer upheld New York City's policy of awarding bridge and tunnel toll discounts to residents of certain neighborhoods. The plaintiffs, non-resident motorists, had claimed an infringement of the right to travel and of the dormant commerce clause.

===== Exotic dancers' wage claims =====
In 2013 and 2014, in Hart v. Rick's Cabaret, Intern., Inc., Engelmayer issued pretrial decisions holding a Manhattan strip club liable to a class of more than 1,900 exotic dancers for minimum wage, overtime, and other labor law violations. He held that the dancers were employees, not independent contractors, and protected by the federal Fair Labor Standards Act of 1938 and the New York Labor Law. These decisions awarded the class $10.8 million in damages, with additional claims set for trial. The case settled shortly before trial for approximately $15.5 million.

===== Beastie Boys v. Monster Energy =====
In 2014, Engelmayer presided over a two-week jury trial of copyright infringement and Lanham Act false-endorsement claims brought by the hip-hop group the Beastie Boys against the energy drink company Monster Energy, which had used segments of five Beastie Boys songs to promote its products online. The jury found for the Beastie Boys and awarded $1.7 million in damages. Engelmayer's post-trial rulings upheld the verdict and awarded the Beastie Boys an additional $668,000 in prevailing party legal fees.

===== Music licensing antitrust litigation =====
In 2014, Engelmayer sustained conspiracy and monopolization claims under the Sherman Antitrust Act brought by a class of local television broadcast televisions against SESAC, LLC, the nation's third-largest music licensing organization. The case later settled for $58.5 million, with SESAC agreeing to henceforth resolve disputes over royalty rates in arbitration. In approving the class settlement and fee award, Engelmayer equated its terms to the landmark antitrust consent decrees that for decades had bound ASCAP and BMI, the nation's two largest music licensing organizations.

===== Off-label marketing =====
In 2015, in a closely watched action for injunctive relief, Amarin Pharma, Inc. v. U.S. Food & Drug Administration, Engelmayer held that the First Amendment bars the Food and Drug Administration from prosecuting a pharmaceutical manufacturer for misbranding, where the manufacturer's conduct consisted only of truthful speech marketing an off-label use of an FDA-approved product. He held that the First Amendment protects truthful speech by a manufacturer about a product's off-label uses, much as it protects the same speech when made by other speakers, such as doctors. The FDA did not appeal.

===== Bernard L. Madoff bankruptcy =====
Between 2016 and 2019, Engelmayer issued a series of decisions reviewing and approving aspects of the process of valuing and validating customer claims against the bankruptcy estate of Bernard L. Madoff's company.

===== Disabled group home settlement =====
Between 2016 and 2019, Engelmayer presided over litigation over claims on behalf of severely disabled adults of years of physical abuse and deficient care at the Union Avenue IRA, a state-run group home staff called the "Bronx Zoo". In 2019, after Engelmayer sustained the claims of constitutional, statutory, and state-law violations and strongly urged the state to settle, New York State agreed to pay the residents $6 million and to surrender control of the facility to a private nonprofit agency.

===== Mirena multi-district litigation =====
In 2019, Engelmayer granted summary judgment for the defense, ending a nationwide products liability Multidistrict Litigation spanning claims by 920 plaintiffs. The plaintiffs claimed that the synthetic hormone secreted by Mirena, an intrauterine contraceptive product made and marketed by Bayer AG and affiliates, caused users to suffer idiopathic intracranial hypertension (IIH), a condition involving buildup of cerebrospinal fluid around the brain. Engelmayer held that the plaintiffs had not adduced evidence to establish general causation—the capacity of Mirena to cause IIH. He had earlier excluded plaintiffs' seven proposed general causation experts because their testimony did not satisfy Daubert v. Merrill Dow Pharmaceuticals, Inc. and Federal Rule of Evidence 702.

===== Airbnb data ordinance =====
In 2019, in Airbnb, Inc. v. City of New York, Engelmayer enjoined a New York City ordinance that required home-sharing companies to turn over voluminous data monthly about hosts, finding it facially invalid under the Fourth Amendment. Calling the scale of the required monthly productions breathtaking and unprecedented, he wrote: "The city has not cited any decision suggesting that the governmental appropriation of private business records on such a scale, unsupported by individualized suspicion or any tailored justification, qualifies as a reasonable search and seizure." He added: "An attempt by a municipality in an era before electronic data storage to compel an entire industry monthly to copy and produce its records as to all local customers would have been unthinkable under the Fourth Amendment." New York City and Airbnb later settled the lawsuit.

===== Khashoggi FOIA litigation =====
In 2019, in a ruling on a Freedom of Information Act request, Engelmayer ordered the U.S. Departments of State and Defense each to process at least 5,000 pages per month of materials relating to the killing of Saudi journalist and U.S. resident Jamal Khashoggi. Rejecting the agencies' request for a slower pace of processing, he said the request concerned "a matter of exceptional public importance and obvious and unusual time sensitivity".

===== Conscience rule =====
In 2019, Engelmayer invalidated a 2019 rule that the U.S. Department of Health and Human Services had promulgated to define the statutory conscience rights of federally funded health care entities and providers. The rule superseded a narrower 2011 rule, adding broadened definitions, new compliance regulations, and a new enforcement mechanism. On a challenge brought by states and cities led by New York State, Engelmayer held that HHS had violated the Administrative Procedure Act. The agency had no authority to impose major portions of the rule, he held, and its stated justification for the new rule-making "in the first place—a purported 'significant increase' in civilian complaints relating to the conscience provisions—was factually untrue." Engelmayer enjoined the rule's enforcement nationwide. Later the same month, courts in the Northern District of California and the Eastern District of Washington issued similar rulings. HHS later dismissed its appeal of the decision and, in 2024, proposed an alternative rule implementing the statutory conscience provisions.

===== Nasdaq Exchange Traded Funds litigation =====
In 2019, after a 10-day bench trial, Engelmayer entered judgment in favor of Nasdaq, Inc., owner of the world's second-largest stock exchange, on breach-of-contract claims against Exchange Traded Funds Managers Group, LLC, a company that constructed and managed index funds. He held that ETFMG had unlawfully seized and claimed entitlement to the stream of profits generated by a series of index funds, including a successful cybersecurity index fund known as HACK. He awarded Nasdaq more than $78.4 million, plus prejudgment interest.

===== Blind pedestrian access =====
In 2020, in American Council for the Blind of New York, Inc. v. City of New York, Engelmayer held that New York City's longstanding failure to make its pedestrian grid meaningfully accessible to blind and low-vision pedestrians violated the ADA and state and city law. In 2021, he ordered a remedial plan for those violations. It required the City to install accessible pedestrian signals (APS) at a pace that would result in 10,000 signalized intersections equipped with APS by the end of 2031. In 2022 and 2023, the first two years the remedial plan was implemented, the City's Department of Transportation installed, respectively, 519 and 885 APSs at city intersections, exceeding the plan's targets of 400 and 500 APSs, respectively.

===== Leon Black =====
In 2022, Engelmayer dismissed a racketeering lawsuit brought by hedge fund founder Leon Black against his former paramour, her law firm, his former business partner, and a public relations executive, who Black alleged had formed a cabal to destroy him. Engelmayer later denied the law firm's motion for Rule 11 sanctions against Black, while noting that that motion had presented a substantial question.

===== SEC regulation FD =====
In 2022, addressing a question of first impression, Engelmayer denied a facial challenge under the First Amendment to the Securities and Exchange Commission's Regulation Fair Disclosure (Reg FD). Promulgated in 2000, Reg FD prevents corporations and insiders from making selective disclosures of material non-public information. The challenge arose in a case involving claims by the SEC against the telecommunications company AT&T and three executives. After Engelmayer denied both sides' summary judgment motions, the case settled.

===== Border separation of non-citizens =====
In 2023, in a case arising out of the Trump administration's border separation policy, Engelmayer sustained in part and dismissed in part the tort claims of a non-citizen father and son that they had been unlawfully separated at the U.S./Mexico border in 2018.

===== Ending Forced Arbitration Act =====
In 2023, Engelmayer issued a pair of decisions addressing questions of first impression under the Ending Forced Arbitration of Sexual Assault and Sexual Harassment Act of 2021 (EFAA), enacted in 2022. In one, he held that the EFAA's invalidation of arbitration agreements in cases of sexual assault or harassment extends to the entirety of the case, not merely to the discrete claims that themselves allege or relate to such harassment. In the other, he held the EFAA to require, where a party seeks to invoke the EFAA based on a claim of sexual harassment, that that claim have been plausibly pled.

===== Solar Winds securities litigation =====
In 2024, in a closely watched case, Engelmayer dismissed most claims the SEC brought against cybersecurity company Solar Winds and its chief information security officer, Timothy Brown. In December 2020, Solar Winds disclosed that it had fallen victim to a large-scale cyberattack known as SUNBURST. Engelmayer dismissed the SEC's claim that Solar Winds's disclosures about the attack were inadequate. He also dismissed the SEC's claim that the company had inadequate cybersecurity controls, holding that the Securities Exchange Act's accounting controls provision does not give the SEC authority to regulate cybersecurity controls. But Engelmayer sustained the securities fraud claims based on a "Security Statement" on the company's website. The SEC, he held, adequately pleaded that Solar Winds and Brown, in that statement, falsely and misleadingly touted the company's cybersecurity, including its password and access controls, as strong.

==== DOGE access to Treasury payment systems ====
On February 7, 2025, Engelmayer granted a temporary injunction sought by New York Attorney General Letitia James and 17 other state attorneys general blocking further access by DOGE to the Treasury Department's payment processing systems. The order required return and destruction of data so far obtained. It was largely grounded in citizen privacy rights, the threat of identity theft, and the risk of hacking. In response, Representative Derrick Van Orden, a Republican, filed articles of impeachment against Engelmayer, accusing him of acting "outside the bounds of judicial propriety" and of "using his authority to further personal or political interests." The impeachment resolution was referred to the House Committee on the Judiciary but never advanced to the full House floor.

==== Notable criminal cases and rulings ====
===== Racketeering =====
Beginning in 2011, Engelmayer presided over the prosecution of 76 members of the Bronx Trinitarios Gang (BTG), a northwest Bronx gang alleged to be responsible for more than 10 murders, numerous acts of violence, firearms offenses, and narcotics dealing. It resulted in two trials: a 12-week trial of three defendants centered on five murders, and an eight-week trial of two defendants centered on one murder, each resulting in convictions.

Beginning in 2015, Engelmayer presided over the prosecution of 28 members of the 18 Park Gang, a gang based in the Patterson Houses complex in the Bronx alleged to be responsible for two murders, numerous acts of violence, firearms offenses, and narcotics dealing. It resulted in two trials: of three defendants, and of one defendant, each resulting in convictions. The Government also moved to transfer a juvenile (17-year-old) gang member for prosecution as an adult, but after a one-week evidentiary hearing, Engelmayer denied the motion.

Beginning in 2018, Engelmayer presided over the prosecution of 13 members of the Nine Trey gang, a New York City gang alleged to be a Bloods affiliate and responsible for acts of violence and narcotics dealing. The prosecution resulted in a three-week trial in 2019 of two defendants, resulting in convictions. A cooperating witness in the racketeering case was Daniel Hernandez, better known as American rapper 6ix9ine. Engelmayer sentenced 6ix9ine to 24 months in prison, five years of supervised release, and 300 hours of community service.

===== Terrorism =====
In 2019, Engelmayer sentenced Sajmir Alihmehmeti, who was charged with and shortly before trial pleaded guilty to attempting to provide material support to the terrorist group ISIS, to 22 years in prison.

In 2023, Engelmayer sentenced James Bradley and Arwa Muthana, a husband and wife who each pleaded guilty to attempting to provide material support to ISIS, to 11 years and 9 years in prison, respectively.

In 2023, Engelmayer sentenced Bashir Kulmiye, a Somali guard who pleaded guilty to participating in holding kidnapped American journalist Michael Scott Moore, to 150 months in prison. Two leaders of Moore's abduction and kidnapping were later each sentenced to 30 years' imprisonment.

===== Second Amendment =====
In 2023, Engelmayer upheld a federal firearms statute, 18 U.S.C. § 922(n), against a challenge based on the Supreme Court's Second Amendment decision New York State Rifle & Pistol Ass’n, Inc. v. Bruen. The statute makes it a crime for a person, while under indictment for a crime of imprisonment exceeding one year, to ship, transport, or receive a firearm that has traveled in interstate commerce.

===== White-collar crime =====
In 2014, Engelmayer sentenced Nelson Castro, a Bronx assemblyman who was a longtime secret government informant, making recordings of colleagues while twice winning reelection. Calling Castro's cooperation historic and noting that it resulted in successful prosecutions including of a fellow assemblyman, Engelmayer sentenced Castro to two years' probation and 500 hours of community service on his federal false statement charge. "[T]he good that you did by cooperating over a period of years exposed and put an end to far more official corruption and misconduct than you engaged in", Engelmayer said. Too often, he said, elected officials "talk a good game about fighting corruption and then they do nothing about it. For all your warts, for all your misdeeds, you did something about it."

In 2015, Engelmayer sentenced Dmitry Braverman, an IT employee at the law firm of Wilson Sonsini, to two years in prison on insider trading charges, based on his trading ahead of mergers underway at the law firm.

In 2016, Engelmayer sentenced Alonzo Knowles, a Bahamian man who hacked celebrities' email and attempted to sell unreleased movie and television scripts and personal images and videos, to 60 months in prison. The sentence was about twice as long as recommended by federal sentencing guidelines, in part because Knowles, while awaiting sentencing, had been caught sending emails plotting, upon his release, to sell the scripts and materials.

In 2016, Engelmayer presided over the trial of "Banana King" Thomas Hoey on charges that he embezzled nearly $800,000 from his banana-distribution company's employees' retirement fund. Hoey was convicted at trial and sentenced to 84 months' imprisonment, 66 of which were to run largely consecutive to a separate federal sentence on narcotics and obstruction of justice charges.

In 2017, Engelmayer presided over the trial on insider trading charges of John Afriyie, a Wall Street investment analyst who used his employer's confidential information relating to a potential acquisition of ADT Corp. as the basis to buy call options, which gained him more than $1.5 million when the acquisition was announced. Afriyie fled on the day of trial but was found and convicted. Engelmayer sentenced him to 45 months in prison.

In 2021 and 2022, Engelmayer presided over the prosecution of five Long Island Rail Road officials for a scheme to inflate their overtime hours. Each, in 2018, reportedly received more than $200,000 in overtime pay, with one claiming to have worked 3,864 overtime hours on top of 1,682 regular hours. Engelmayer called the offense "an orgy of overtime fraud carried out on an epic scale". He imposed sentences ranging from two to eight months in prison.

In 2022, Engelmayer sentenced Hollywood executive William Sadlier to six years' imprisonment for defrauding a BlackRock investment fund of more than $30 million, based on two wire fraud schemes in which he posed as an executive of a sham company.

In 2022, Engelmayer presided over the trial of Stefan Gillier, a Belgian national extradited to the U.S., on wire fraud conspiracy charges based on a scheme to obtain over $6 million in aircraft parts. Gillier was convicted at trial. In 2023, Engelmayer sentenced him to 84 months in prison.

In 2024, Engelmayer presided over the trial of Jonathan Moynahan Larmore, who was convicted of orchestrating a $77 million tender offer fraud. It involved announcing a fake tender offer for shares of WeWork Inc. by a company Larmore founded at a price that stood to drive up WeWork's stock price. Days earlier, Larmore had purchased thousands of WeWork options that stood to be worth millions of dollars had the scheme succeeded.

== Personal life ==
Engelmayer is married. He is a fan of the New York Yankees.

== See also ==
- List of Jewish American jurists
- List of law clerks for the tenth seat of the Supreme Court of the United States

Legal offices
Preceded by Gerard E. Lynch	Judge of the United States District Court for the Southern District of New York; 2011–present	Incumbent
