= Maurene Comey =

American attorney (born 1988)

- Born: Maurene Ryan Comey; August 1988 (age 38)
- Education: College of William and Mary (BA); Harvard University (JD)
- Spouse: Lucas Issacharoff
- Father: James Comey

Maurene Ryan Comey (born August 1988) is an American attorney who served as an assistant United States attorney in the U.S. Attorney's Office for the Southern District of New York (SDNY) from 2016 to 2025. She rose to prominence as one of the lead attorneys in the prosecution of Sean Combs.

== Early life and education ==
Maurene Ryan Comey was born in August 1988. She is the daughter of James Comey and Patrice Failor and the eldest of six siblings. Her father is a former prosecutor who served as the director of the Federal Bureau of Investigation from 2013 until his dismissal by Donald Trump in 2017.

In 2010 Comey graduated from the College of William & Mary, where she performed in the Sinfonicron Light Opera Company. She graduated from Harvard Law School in 2013.

== Career ==
=== Law clerk and legal associate ===
After graduating from Harvard Law School, Comey worked as an associate for Debevoise & Plimpton. She was a law clerk to judge Loretta Preska.

=== U.S. Attorney's Office for the Southern District of New York ===
Comey began working for the U.S. Attorney's Office for the Southern District of New York in 2014, began serving as a prosecutor the following year, and became an assistant United States attorney by May 2016. In July 2019, she began handling the criminal case filed against the financier Jeffrey Epstein. By December 2021, Comey had become the chief of the Violent and Organized Crime Unit. She was later involved in the prosecution of Epstein's accomplice, Ghislaine Maxwell, of the gynecologist Robert Hadden, and of Sean Combs, leading the latter.

=== Federal dismissal ===
In May 2025, Laura Loomer publicly called for the dismissal of Comey and her husband Lucas Issacharoff, citing their proximity to James Comey.

On July 16, 2025, the United States Department of Justice dismissed Comey as a senior trial counsel. According to The New York Times, a letter informing her of her termination and signed by Francey Hakes, the director of the Executive Office for United States Attorneys, cited Article Two of the United States Constitution. CNN later reported that an official described her connection to her father, James Comey, as untenable; according to ABC News, president Donald Trump was reportedly furious that a relative of the elder Comey worked in his administration.

In September 2025, Comey sued the Department of Justice over her firing.

=== Patterson Belknap Webb & Tyler ===
In February 2026, Comey joined the law firm of Patterson Belknap Webb & Tyler, where she works in white-collar criminal defense and civil litigation as a partner.

== Lawsuit against the Department of Justice ==
On September 15, 2025, Maurene Comey filed a federal civil action challenging her abrupt termination from the Department of Justice (DOJ). Comey, a longtime federal prosecutor in the Southern District of New York (SDNY) and the daughter of former FBI Director James Comey, alleges that she was fired without cause, without notice, and in retaliation for her familial connection to one of Donald Trump’s most prominent critics.

Comey’s complaint asserts violations of the Civil Service Reform Act, the First Amendment, the Fifth Amendment and separation-of-powers principles. Legal analysts and news organizations have described the suit as a major test of executive power over the career federal workforce.

=== Background ===
According to her lawsuit, Comey was asked on July 15, 2025, to take the lead on a new "major public corruption case." The next day, shortly before 5 p.m., she received an email from DOJ headquarters stating she had been removed "pursuant to Article II of the Constitution," without identifying any misconduct or performance issue.

Comey had served nearly a decade in SDNY, earning repeated "Outstanding" performance reviews and handling some of the office’s highest-profile matters, including the Epstein, Maxwell, Hadden, and Combs cases. U.S. Attorney Jay Clayton told Comey, "All I can say is it came from Washington. I can’t tell you anything else," according to the complaint and subsequent reporting.

Additional reporting noted that Comey’s firing came during a period in which the Trump administration had removed numerous career prosecutors and DOJ employees, sometimes without explanation, and sometimes amid political pressure over sensitive cases.

=== Lawsuit ===
Comey filed suit in the U.S. District Court for the Southern District of New York, seeking reinstatement, back pay, and declaratory relief. Her complaint raises four central claims:

==== 1. Civil Service Reform Act ====
The lawsuit alleges that Comey, a career civil-service employee, was fired in violation of statutory protections that bar politically motivated or arbitrary terminations and require notice, cause, and an opportunity to respond.

==== 2. First Amendment retaliation ====
Comey alleges she was dismissed because of her father’s criticism of Trump and her perceived political affiliation. The complaint cites online calls by activist Laura Loomer urging her removal, which were widely circulated in pro-Trump circles.

==== 3. Fifth Amendment due process ====
The suit claims Comey had a protected property interest in her continued employment and that the government violated her procedural due-process rights by removing her without prior notice or an opportunity to respond.

==== 4. Separation of powers and misuse of Article II ====
Comey’s filing challenges the Trump administration’s reliance on Article II as a basis for removing a career civil-service employee outside statutory procedures. Her counsel argues that the executive branch cannot unilaterally override protections enacted by Congress.

=== DOJ response and venue issues ===
For two months following the filing, the Justice Department did not respond to the lawsuit. Multiple U.S. attorney’s offices, including Manhattan, Brooklyn, and the Civil Division’s Federal Programs Branch, declined to take the case, citing conflicts or other reasons.

On November 13, 2025, the Northern District of New York, led by Trump ally John Sarcone III, filed a notice appearing on behalf of the government and indicated it planned to seek transfer of the case out of the Southern District.

=== Broader context ===
Maurene Comey’s lawsuit cites, among other factors, the hostile relationship between Trump and her father, and argues that no legitimate, performance-based reason existed for her dismissal. On September 25, 2025, her father James Comey was indicted, following President Trump’s direction to Attorney General Pam Bondi to pursue charges.

Comey’s termination occurred amid heightened scrutiny of Trump’s efforts to assert direct presidential control over the Department of Justice and the administration’s removal of career lawyers and officials without explanation.

Scholars have identified the case as a significant test of civil-service protections established since the Pendleton Civil Service Reform Act of 1883. Analysts note that the lawsuit could determine whether presidents may remove career federal employees for any reason, or whether statutory merit-system protections meaningfully constrain executive authority.

=== Reinstatement ===
On 26 October 2026 a federal judge ruled the justice department illegally fired Maurene Comey. The judge ruled that the Trump administration must reinstate her and that she must be given back pay.

== Personal life ==
She is married to Lucas Issacharoff, who served as an assistant U.S. attorney for the Southern District of New York from September 2019 until his voluntary resignation on May 9, 2025. Lucas is son of Samuel Issacharoff and Cynthia Estlund.

== In popular culture ==
The protagonist in James Comey's Central Park West (2023), Nora Carleton, includes aspects of Maurene Comey, including her profession, her height, and her approximate age.

== See also ==
- James Comey
- Civil Service Reform Act of 1978
- Unitary executive theory
- Donald Trump controversies
- Jeffrey Epstein
- Ghislaine Maxwell
- Targeting of political opponents and civil society under the second Trump administration
