= Michael H. Park =

American judge (born 1976)

Michael Park
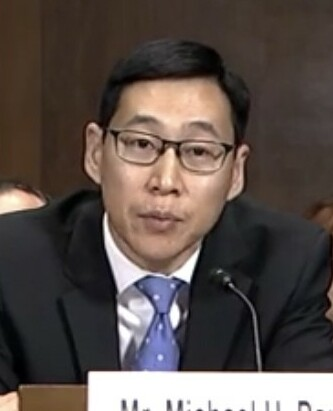

Judge of the United States Court of Appeals for the Second Circuit
- Incumbent
- Assumed office May 13, 2019
- Appointed by: Donald Trump
- Preceded by: Gerard E. Lynch

Personal details
- Born: Michael Hun Park; April 1, 1976 (age 50) Saint Paul, Minnesota, U.S.
- Spouse: Sarah Seo
- Education: Princeton University (BA); Yale University (JD)

Michael Hun Park (born April 1, 1976) is an American lawyer who serves as a United States circuit judge of the United States Court of Appeals for the Second Circuit. Prior to becoming a judge, Park was a named partner at Consovoy McCarthy (originally Consovoy McCarthy Park), a prominent law firm in the conservative legal movement. Park was appointed by Donald Trump and is a member of the Federalist Society.

== Early life and education ==
Park is a graduate of the Thomas Jefferson High School for Science and Technology. Park earned his Bachelor of Arts, magna cum laude, from Princeton University, and his Juris Doctor from Yale Law School in 2001, where he served as managing editor of the Yale Law Journal.

== Early career ==
After graduating from law school, Park served as a law clerk to then-Judge Samuel Alito of the United States Court of Appeals for the Third Circuit.

From 2002 to 2006, he was an associate in the New York City office of Wilmer Cutler Pickering Hale and Dorr.

Park was an attorney-advisor in the United States Department of Justice Office of Legal Counsel for two years, and then again clerked for Alito during the 2008–2009 term after he became an associate justice of the Supreme Court of the United States. There, he was a co-clerk with Andy Oldham. He was counsel at Dechert from 2009 to 2011 and a partner from 2012 to 2015. From 2015 to 2019, he practiced as a name partner at the boutique litigation firm Consovoy McCarthy Park PLLC.

In 2016, Park represented the Kansas Department of Health and Environment in its effort to cut off Medicaid funding to Planned Parenthood. In 2017, Park led efforts to challenge a United States Environmental Protection Agency (EPA) rule under the Clean Water Act that sought to expand the statute's protection of wetlands. In 2018, Park worked on behalf of Project on Fair Representation to defend the Trump Administration's efforts to insert a citizenship question into the 2020 United States census.

Park is an adjunct professor at the Antonin Scalia Law School, where he teaches the Supreme Court Clinic. He is also an adjunct professor at Columbia Law School.

He is a member of the Board of Trustees of the Supreme Court Historical Society, the Board of Directors of Operation Exodus Inner City, the Asian American Bar Association of New York and the Federalist Society.

== Federal judicial service ==
On October 10, 2018, President Donald Trump announced his intent to nominate Park to serve as a United States Circuit Judge of the United States Court of Appeals for the Second Circuit. Park became the second Asian Pacific American and the first Korean American to serve on the Second Circuit. On November 13, 2018, his nomination was sent to the Senate. President Trump nominated Park to the seat vacated by Judge Gerard E. Lynch, who took senior status on September 5, 2016.

Park was on a list the Trump White House sent to New York Senators Chuck Schumer and Kirsten Gillibrand in July that included three other names for the Second Circuit, where there were two vacancies - the other names were then-United States District Judge Richard J. Sullivan; Matthew McGill, a partner at the law firm Gibson Dunn in Washington, D.C. and Nicholas Quinn Rosenkranz, a professor at Georgetown University Law Center.

On January 3, 2019, his nomination was returned to the President under Rule XXXI, Paragraph 6 of the United States Senate. On January 23, 2019, President Trump announced his intent to renominate Park for a federal judgeship. His nomination was sent to the Senate later that day On February 13, 2019, a hearing on Park's nomination was held before the Senate Judiciary Committee.

Schumer and Gillibrand, the two Democratic Senators from Park's home state, refused to return blue slips for his nomination. Despite this, on March 7, 2019, the committee proceeded with the nomination and reported out it by a party-line 12–10 vote.

On May 8, 2019, the U.S. Senate invoked Cloture on his nomination by a vote of 51–43.

On May 9, 2019, Park's nomination was confirmed by a vote of 52–41.

He received his judicial commission on May 13, 2019.

== Personal life ==
Park is married to Sarah Seo, a legal historian and Professor of Law at Columbia Law School.

== See also ==
- Donald Trump Supreme Court candidates
- List of Asian American jurists
- List of law clerks for the eighth seat of the Supreme Court of the United States

== Select publications ==
- Park, Michael H. (September 8, 2014). "Court's 'No-Action' Clause Holding May Surprise Bond Issuers" (PDF). New York Law Journal. (posted at Dechert)

Legal offices
Preceded by Gerard E. Lynch	Judge of the United States Court of Appeals for the Second Circuit; 2019–present	Incumbent
