= Francis A. Winslow =

American judge

Judge of the United States District Court for the Southern District of New York
- In office January 4, 1923 – April 1, 1929
- Appointed by: Warren G. Harding
- Preceded by: Seat established by 42 Stat. 837
- Succeeded by: Vincent L. Leibell

Personal details
- Born: Francis Asbury Winslow; October 13, 1866 Ossining, New York
- Died: March 29, 1932 (aged 65) Yonkers, New York
- Education: City College of New York (B.S.); Columbia Law School (LL.B.)

Francis Asbury Winslow (October 13, 1866 – March 29, 1932) was a United States district judge of the United States District Court for the Southern District of New York.

== Education and career ==
Born on October 13, 1866, in Ossining, New York. Winslow received a Bachelor of Science degree from City College of New York in 1887. He received a Bachelor of Laws from Columbia Law School in 1889. He was in private practice of law in Yonkers, New York from 1889 for various periods until 1907. He was Corporation Counsel for Yonkers in 1901 and from 1903 to 1905. He was District Attorney of Westchester County, New York from 1907 to 1913. He was an Attorney for the New York State Comptroller and New York State Tax Commission in Westchester County from 1915 to 1922. He also served as General Counsel for the National Poultry, Butter and Egg Association.

== Federal judicial service ==
Winslow was nominated by President Warren G. Harding on December 28, 1922, to the United States District Court for the Southern District of New York, to a new seat authorized by 42 Stat. 837. He was confirmed by the United States Senate on January 4, 1923, and received his commission the same day. His service terminated on April 1, 1929, due to his resignation following allegations of impropriety in the selection of court-appointed receivers.

== Post judicial service and death ==
Following his resignation from the federal bench, Winslow was in private practice of law in Yonkers from 1929 to 1932. He died in Yonkers, on March 29, 1932.

== Sources ==
Legal offices
Preceded by Seat established by 42 Stat. 837	Judge of the United States District Court for the Southern District of New York; 1923–1929	Succeeded by Vincent L. Leibell
