= Alexander Bicks =

American judge

Judge of the United States District Court for the Southern District of New York
- In office May 12, 1954 – May 9, 1963
- Appointed by: Dwight D. Eisenhower
- Preceded by: Vincent L. Leibell
- Succeeded by: Charles Henry Tenney

Personal details
- Born: Alexander Bicks; March 17, 1901 Russian Empire
- Died: May 9, 1963 (aged 62) New York City, New York
- Education: New York University (LLB)

Alexander Bicks (March 17, 1901 – May 9, 1963) was an American lawyer and jurist who served as a United States district judge of the United States District Court for the Southern District of New York.

== Early life and education ==
Born in the Russian Empire, Bicks received a Bachelor of Laws from New York University School of Law in 1922.

== Career ==
Bicks worked in private practice in New York City, New York from 1924 to 1954. On April 6, 1954, Bicks was nominated by President Dwight D. Eisenhower to a seat on the United States District Court for the Southern District of New York vacated by Judge Vincent L. Leibell. Bicks was confirmed by the United States Senate on May 11, 1954, and received his commission on May 12, 1954. He served in that capacity until his death on May 9, 1963, in New York City.

== Personal life ==
Bicks's son, Robert Bicks was a lawyer who served in the United States Department of Justice Antitrust Division.

== See also ==
- List of Jewish American jurists
