= John E. Sprizzo =

American judge

Senior Judge of the United States District Court for the Southern District of New York
- In office January 1, 2000 – December 16, 2008

Judge of the United States District Court for the Southern District of New York
- In office September 28, 1981 – January 1, 2000
- Appointed by: Ronald Reagan
- Preceded by: Charles Henry Tenney
- Succeeded by: Gerard E. Lynch

Personal details
- Born: John Emilio Sprizzo; December 23, 1934 Brooklyn, New York
- Died: December 16, 2008 (aged 73) Manhattan, New York
- Education: St. John's University (B.A.); St. John's University School of Law (LL.B.)

John Emilio Sprizzo (December 23, 1934 – December 16, 2008) was a United States district judge of the United States District Court for the Southern District of New York.

== Biography ==
=== Early life ===
Sprizzo was born in Brooklyn, New York, where his father was a milkman and his mother cut patterns for dresses. He attended St. John's University in Queens, where he received a Bachelor of Arts degree in 1956 and was awarded a Bachelor of Laws from St. John's University School of Law in 1959.

=== Early career ===
He was an attorney in the Organized Crime Section of the Criminal Division at the United States Department of Justice from 1959 to 1963. Sprizzo was an Assistant United States Attorney at the Southern District of New York from 1963 to 1968, rising to chief appellate attorney in 1965 and assistant chief of the Criminal Division in 1966. He taught at the Fordham University School of Law from 1968 to 1972. In 1970, he went into private practice at the New York firm of Curtis, Mallet-Prevost, Colt & Mosle, where he helped establish the firm's litigation department.

Sprizzo had served on the Knapp Commission in 1971, responsible for investigating corruption in the New York City Police Department. In 1973 and 1974, he had been a defense counsel to John N. Mitchell, the former United States Attorney General, successfully defending him against conspiracy and perjury charges related to Mitchell's alleged involvement in the Watergate scandal.

=== Federal judicial service ===
A bi-partisan 10-member screening committee included Sprizzo as one of three prospective candidates from whom United States Senator Daniel Patrick Moynihan would choose one to nominate to fill the vacancy to succeed Judge Charles Henry Tenney; the other two candidates were Edward Brodsky and Rudolph Giuliani. Moynihan selected Sprizzo to fill the vacancy in February 1980.

Sprizzo was nominated to the United States District Court for the Southern District of New York by President Ronald Reagan on July 29, 1981, to the seat vacated by Judge Charles Henry Tenney, confirmed by the United States Senate on September 25, 1981, and received his commission on September 28, 1981. Sprizzo assumed senior status on January 1, 2000, remaining in that status until his death.

== Notable cases ==
In 1984, Sprizzo heard an extradition request from the British government for the return of Joe Doherty, a member of the Provisional Irish Republican Army who had killed a British soldier in an ambush in Northern Ireland, escaped from a prison in Belfast two days before his conviction and fled to the United States, where he was captured in a Manhattan bar. Sprizzo ruled that the discipline of the IRA's provisional wing made the killing a political act that was excluded by the extradition treaty between the United States and Britain. A British Conservative MP Jill Knight called the ruling "a seal of approval to murder, maiming and terrorism". Officials from the US Justice Department called the ruling "outrageous" because it made the United States legal system complicit in terrorism.

Ultimately Sprizzo's ruling led to changes in United States extradition laws. Doherty was deported in February 1992.

In 1989, Sprizzo issued a scathing criticism of prosecutors in a drug conspiracy case when he dismissed charges against seven defendants. He sealed the court transcripts to keep his remarks out of the newspapers after he berated the prosecutors for their inadequate preparation. But they were released after The New York Times filed a protest:

Assistant United States Attorney Margaret S. Groban: It just seems a little hard for us that the first time we hear your honor's interpretation of membership is the day when you are going to let heroin traffickers walk out the door.

Judge Sprizzo: Now, wait. You are not going to lay that one on me. You let heroin traffickers out the door by not proceeding in a competent enough fashion to meet the possibility that the judge would not agree with you. . . . Do you know what is wrong with your office, and you in particular? You assume all we have to do is say narcotics.

Groban: That is not true.

Sprizzo: And the judge will roll over and let the case go to the jury. You people have not been trained the way I have been trained, dealing with judges like Judge Wyatt who threw my conspiracy count out, and other judges like Borelli who made the same kind of sophisticated analysis of conspiracy law. Your natural assumption is that we will go in all or nothing because in every case we have gotten away with it. I am telling you that in this case you didn't get away with it. If you had been a competent prosecutor, which you are not, you would have hedged against the possibility that maybe the judge would disagree with you. But it never occurs in the mind of you or anyone in your office that any trial judge will ever disagree with you on the law. Therefore, you do what you want in the face of clear admonitions from the court that these were dice you were rolling. Let's assume I am wrong; let's assume I am erroneous. A competent prosecutor would have hedged against the possibility that the judge might be wrong and decided an issue against the Government, and you put in a separate conspiracy count just to cover that possibility. If these drug dealers are walking free, it is because you did not hedge against that possibility. Don't lay it on my doorstep. I think I am right about the law. But even if I am wrong on the law, if they are walking out of here it is because you people were not competent enough to put in an extra charge in your indictment. Sit down.

In 1995, Sprizzo issued a permanent injunction against two anti-abortion protesters — a retired Roman Catholic auxiliary bishop and a Franciscan friar — who had blocked the entrance to a women's medical clinic in Dobbs Ferry, New York, on multiple occasions. When the two were arrested in 1996 on similar charges in apparent criminal contempt of the injunction, Sprizzo cleared the men on the basis that they had acted out of religious conviction. Sprizzo acquitted the two men as they had been acting on "sincere, genuine, objectively based" religious convictions, in a decision that The New York Times described as having "startled both sides in the abortion debate".

== Death ==
Sprizzo died in Manhattan at age 73 on December 16, 2008, of organ failure.

== Sources ==
Legal offices
| Preceded by Charles Henry Tenney | Judge of the United States District Court for the Southern District of New York; 1981–2000 | Succeeded by Gerard E. Lynch |
