= Charles Henry Tenney =

American judge

Senior Judge of the United States District Court for the Southern District of New York
- In office January 31, 1979 – November 11, 1994

Judge of the United States District Court for the Southern District of New York
- In office December 12, 1963 – January 31, 1979
- Nominated by: John F. Kennedy
- Appointed by: Lyndon B. Johnson
- Preceded by: Alexander Bicks
- Succeeded by: John E. Sprizzo

Personal details
- Born: Charles Henry Tenney; January 28, 1911 New York City, New York, U.S.
- Died: November 11, 1994 (aged 83) Islip, New York, U.S.
- Education: Yale University (AB, LLB)

Charles Henry Tenney (January 28, 1911 – November 11, 1994) was a United States district judge of the United States District Court for the Southern District of New York.

== Education and career ==
Born in New York City, New York, Tenney received an Artium Baccalaureus degree from Yale University in 1933 and a Bachelor of Laws from Yale Law School in 1936. He was in private practice in New York City from 1936 to 1942. He was a United States Naval Reserve Lieutenant Commander during World War II, from 1942 to 1946. He was in private practice in New York City from 1946 to 1955. He was Commissioner of the Department of Investigation in New York City from 1955 to 1958. He was corporation counsel for New York City from 1958 to 1961. He was city administrator of New York City from 1961 to 1962. He was deputy mayor of New York City from 1962 to 1964.

== Federal judicial service ==
On July 22, 1963, Tenney was nominated by President John F. Kennedy to a seat on the United States District Court for the Southern District of New York vacated by Judge Alexander Bicks. Tenney was confirmed by the United States Senate on December 5, 1963, and received his commission from President Lyndon B. Johnson on December 12, 1963. He assumed senior status on January 31, 1979. Tenney served in that capacity until his death on November 11, 1994, in Islip, New York.

== Notable case ==
Tenney is the author of the seminal patent damages case, Georgia-Pacific Corp. v. U.S. Plywood Corp., 318 F.Supp. 1116 (S.D.N.Y. 1970). In it, he set forth fifteen non-exclusive factors to assist courts in determining the "reasonable royalty" owed a patent holder by an infringer in a patent suit. His opinion has since been cited in more than five-hundred court opinions.

== Personal ==
Tenney was the grandson of Charles H. Tenney, founder of C.H. Tenney & Co., who made his fortune as the leading hat dealer in the world throughout both the late Victorian era and the Edwardian era and was also a New York banker. Tenney's daughter Patricia Lusk Tenney married John Randolph Hearst Jr., the grandson of newspaper man and publisher William Randolph Hearst.

== See also ==
- Robert F. Wagner Jr. - served as Deputy Mayor for Wagner

== Sources ==
Legal offices
Preceded by Alexander Bicks	Judge of the United States District Court for the Southern District of New York; 1963–1979	Succeeded by John E. Sprizzo
