= Vincent L. Leibell (judge) =

American judge

Senior Judge of the United States District Court for the Southern District of New York
- In office January 1, 1954 – September 22, 1968

Judge of the United States District Court for the Southern District of New York
- In office June 20, 1936 – January 1, 1954
- Appointed by: Franklin D. Roosevelt
- Preceded by: Francis A. Winslow
- Succeeded by: Alexander Bicks

Personal details
- Born: Vincent L. Leibell; December 10, 1883 New York City, New York
- Died: September 22, 1968 (aged 84) New York City, New York
- Education: St. Francis Xavier College (M.A.); Fordham University School of Law (LL.B.)

Vincent L. Leibell (December 10, 1883 – September 22, 1968) was a United States district judge of the United States District Court for the Southern District of New York.

== Education and career ==
Born in New York City, New York, Leibell received a Master of Arts degree from St. Francis Xavier College in 1905 and a Bachelor of Laws from Fordham University School of Law in 1908. He was in private practice in New York City from 1909 to 1936.

== Federal judicial service ==
On June 8, 1936, Leibell was nominated by President Franklin D. Roosevelt to a seat on the United States District Court for the Southern District of New York vacated by Judge Francis A. Winslow. Leibell was confirmed by the United States Senate on June 16, 1936, and received his commission on June 20, 1936. He assumed senior status on January 1, 1954, serving in that capacity until his death on September 22, 1968, in New York City.

== Family ==
Leibell was the grandfather of former New York State Senator Vincent Leibell.

== Sources ==
Legal offices
Preceded by Francis A. Winslow	Judge of the United States District Court for the Southern District of New York; 1936–1954	Succeeded by Alexander Bicks
