= Gerard E. Lynch =

American judge (born 1951)

Gerard Lynch
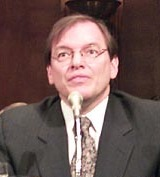
- Lynch in 2000

Senior Judge of the United States Court of Appeals for the Second Circuit
- Incumbent
- Assumed office September 5, 2016

Judge of the United States Court of Appeals for the Second Circuit
- In office September 18, 2009 – September 5, 2016
- Appointed by: Barack Obama
- Preceded by: Chester J. Straub
- Succeeded by: Michael H. Park

Judge of the United States District Court for the Southern District of New York
- In office May 25, 2000 – September 21, 2009
- Appointed by: Bill Clinton
- Preceded by: John E. Sprizzo
- Succeeded by: Paul A. Engelmayer

Personal details
- Born: Gerard Edmund Lynch; September 4, 1951 (age 74) New York City, New York, U.S.
- Education: Columbia University (BA, JD)

Gerard Edmund Lynch (born September 4, 1951) is an American lawyer who serves as a senior United States circuit judge of the United States Court of Appeals for the Second Circuit. He was confirmed to that seat on September 17, 2009, after previously having been appointed in 2000 by President Bill Clinton to serve on the United States District Court for the Southern District of New York. Judge Lynch was the first appeals-court judge nominated by President Barack Obama to win confirmation from the United States Senate.

Lynch is also the Paul J. Kellner Professor Emeritus at Columbia Law School.

== Education and early career ==
Born in Brooklyn, New York, Lynch graduated from Regis High School in 1968, received his Bachelors of Arts degree from Columbia University in 1972, and his Juris Doctor from Columbia Law School in 1975, graduating first in his class at all three institutions. He joined the Columbia faculty in 1977, following judicial clerkships for Judge Wilfred Feinberg of the United States Court of Appeals for the Second Circuit in 1975–76 and United States Supreme Court Justice William J. Brennan, Jr. in 1976–77. He served as Assistant United States Attorney for the Southern District of New York from 1980 to 1983, prosecuting white-collar criminal cases and serving as chief appellate attorney. He returned to that office as chief of the criminal division in 1990–92. He was in private practice of law in New York City from 1992 to 2000.

Lynch served as Vice Dean of Columbia Law School from 1992 to 1997. He has been a visiting professor or lecturer at Hebrew University of Jerusalem; National Police Academy (Tokyo); University of Tokyo; University of Buenos Aires; the Leiden University; and the University of Amsterdam. He was appointed counsel to numerous city, state, and federal commissions and special prosecutors investigating public corruption, including the Iran/Contra investigation, where among other responsibilities he briefed and argued the prosecution position in the appeal of Oliver North. He briefed and argued cases in federal appellate courts, including the Supreme Court, and as a cooperating attorney with the American and New York Civil Liberties Unions. He also has extensive experience as a defense attorney in state and federal cases.

Lynch is a member of the American Law Institute and sits on its council. He is also a member of various bar associations and advisory committees. He has published and lectured on the federal racketeering laws, sentencing, plea bargaining and other aspects of criminal law, constitutional theory, and legal ethics. He received the student-voted Willis Reese Award for Excellence in Teaching in 1994, and in 1997 became the first member of the law faculty to receive the university-wide President's Award for Outstanding Teaching. His principal teaching and research areas include criminal law and procedure, sentencing, and professional responsibility.

== Federal judicial service ==
=== District court service ===
On February 28, 2000, Lynch was nominated by President Bill Clinton to a seat on the United States District Court for the Southern District of New York vacated by John E. Sprizzo. After Lynch was nominated to the district court in 2000, some Senate Republicans expressed concerns that he was a judicial activist, citing a previous warning in writings by Lynch warning the legal community not to overemphasize words from "18th- and 19th-century dictionaries" when interpreting the United States Constitution. However, as part of a deal between Senate Democrats and Republicans that also paved the way for a vote to confirm Clinton's nomination of Republican Bradley A. Smith to the Federal Election Commission and Federal Circuit nominee Timothy B. Dyk, Lynch was confirmed by the United States Senate on May 24, 2000, by a 63–36 vote, and he received his commission the following day. His service as a district court judge was terminated on September 21, 2009, when he was elevated to the court of appeals.

As a district court judge, Lynch presided over the perjury trial of rap artist Lil' Kim in 2005. He sentenced her to a year and a day in jail. Judge Lynch is also an active participant in Legal Outreach, a non-for-profit organization in which he mentors inner-city kids in New York.

=== Court of appeals service ===
On April 2, 2009, President Barack Obama nominated Lynch to a seat on the United States Court of Appeals for the Second Circuit vacated by Judge Chester J. Straub, who assumed senior status on July 16, 2008. Lynch was confirmed by the United States Senate on September 17, 2009, by a 94–3 vote, and received his commission the following day. Lynch assumed senior status on September 5, 2016.

=== Notable cases as appellate judge ===
- On May 7, 2015, Lynch wrote an opinion for the Second Circuit in Manhattan, ruling that the systematic collection of American's phone records by the NSA is illegal. He referred to the program as "an unprecedented contraction of the privacy expectations of all Americans", advancing the national debate started by the revelations of Edward Snowden.
- On May 31, 2017, Lynch wrote an opinion for the Second Circuit in Manhattan, affirming the conviction and life sentence of Ross William Ulbricht, a/k/a "Dread Pirate Roberts," for operating the Silk Road (marketplace) underground website, that was responsible for the distribution of over $200 million of drugs and other contraband between 2011 and October 2013.
- On February 26, 2018, Lynch authored a dissenting opinion in Zarda v. Altitude Express, Inc., in which he disagreed with the court's holding that Title VII of the 1964 Civil Rights Act applies to sexual-orientation discrimination in the workplace.
- In 2021, Lynch wrote for a panel which reversed the Southern District of New York in Andy Warhol Foundation for the Visual Arts, Inc. v. Goldsmith, holding that Warhol's use of Goldsmith's photograph of Prince as the basis for a series of his own portraits of the musician was not sufficiently transformative to qualify as fair use. The Supreme Court affirmed the decision in 2023.

== See also ==
- List of law clerks for the third seat of the Supreme Court of the United States

Legal offices
Preceded by John E. Sprizzo	Judge of the United States District Court for the Southern District of New York; 2000–2009	Succeeded by Paul A. Engelmayer
Preceded by Chester J. Straub	Judge of the United States Court of Appeals for the Second Circuit; 2009–2016	Succeeded by Michael H. Park
