= Arun Subramanian =

American federal judge (born 1979)

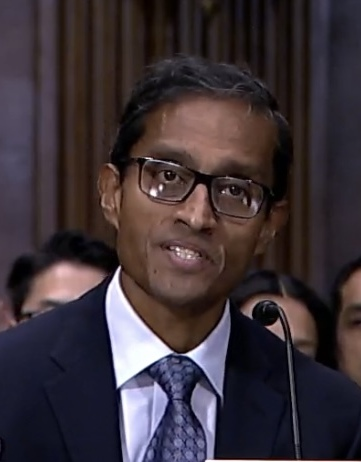
- Subramanian in 2022

Judge of the United States District Court for the Southern District of New York
- Incumbent
- Assumed office April 13, 2023
- Appointed by: Joe Biden
- Preceded by: Alison Nathan

Personal details
- Born: Arun Srinivas Subramanian; 1979 (age 46–47) Pittsburgh, Pennsylvania, U.S.
- Education: Case Western Reserve University (BA); Columbia University (JD)

Arun Srinivas Subramanian (born 1979) is an American lawyer and jurist serving as a U.S. district judge of the U.S. District Court for the Southern District of New York. He was appointed in 2023 by President Joe Biden. Before his appointment, Subramanian was a partner at the law firm Susman Godfrey LLP.

== Early life and education ==
Subramanian was born in Pittsburgh in 1979. His family were Indian Tamils who had immigrated to the United States. His father was a control systems engineer and his mother was a bookkeeper. Subramanian graduated from Case Western Reserve University in 2001 with a Bachelor of Arts, summa cum laude. He then attended Columbia Law School, where he was the executive articles editor of the Columbia Law Review. He graduated in 2004 with a Juris Doctor with James Kent Scholar and Harlan Fiske Stone Scholar honors.

== Career ==
After law school, Subramanian was a law clerk to Judge Dennis Jacobs of the U.S. Court of Appeals for the Second Circuit from 2004 to 2005, to Judge Gerard E. Lynch of the Southern District of New York from 2005 to 2006, and to Justice Ruth Bader Ginsburg of the U.S. Supreme Court from 2006 to 2007. From 2007 to 2023, he was in private practice at the law firm Susman Godfrey LLP in New York City, where he focused on commercial law and bankruptcy law.

=== Federal judicial service ===
Subramanian was recommended to President Joe Biden by Senator Chuck Schumer. On September 2, 2022, President Biden announced his intent to nominate Subramanian to serve as a United States district judge of the United States District Court for the Southern District of New York. On September 6, 2022, his nomination was sent to the Senate. President Biden nominated Subramanian to the seat vacated by Judge Alison Nathan, who was elevated to the United States Court of Appeals for the Second Circuit on March 31, 2022. On December 13, 2022, a hearing on his nomination was held before the Senate Judiciary Committee. On January 3, 2023, his nomination was returned to the President under Rule XXXI, Paragraph 6 of the United States Senate. He was renominated on January 23, 2023. On February 9, 2023, his nomination was reported out of committee by a 16–5 vote. On March 7, 2023, the Senate invoked cloture on his nomination by a 58–37 vote. Later that day, his nomination was confirmed by a 59–37 vote. He received his judicial commission on April 13, 2023. He is the first South Asian judge to serve on the United States District Court for the Southern District of New York.

=== Notable cases ===
In October 2024, Subramanian was designated the judge overseeing the criminal case of rapper and record producer Sean "Diddy" Combs. Subramanian set a trial date for May 5, 2025, alongside issuing an order barring both parties from making statements relating to secret grand jury material and other non-public evidence in the case. The trial began on May 5, 2025. Combs was convicted on the two lesser charges and acquitted of racketeering and trafficking. Subramanian denied bond. On October 3, 2025, following the submissions from the defense and the prosecution as well as admission of some victim impact statements, judge Subramanian imposed a sentence of 50 months in prison and ordered Combs to pay a fine of $500,000. He also authorized 5 years of supervised release of Combs after he has served his time in jail.

== See also ==
- List of Asian American jurists
- List of law clerks for the sixth seat of the Supreme Court of the United States

Legal offices
Preceded by Alison Nathan	Judge of the United States District Court for the Southern District of New York; 2023–present	Incumbent
