= YSL Records racketeering trial =

Criminal trial in Fulton County, Georgia

State of Georgia v. Young Stoner Life (YSL)
- Court: Superior Court of Fulton County
- Full case name: State of Georgia v. Kahlieff Adams, Martinez Arnold, Derontae Bebee, Damone Blalock, Javaris Bradford, Justin Cobb, Cordarius Dorsey, Christian Eppinger, Miles Farley, Jevon Fleetwood, Damekion Garlington, Quantavious Grier, Marquavius Huey, Deamonte Kendrick, Sergio Kitchens, Wunnie Lee, Demise McMullen, Tenquarius Mender, Walter Murphy, Jayden Myrick, Jared Garcia, Quamarvious Nichols, Rodalius Ryan, Antonio Sledge, Trontavious Stephens, Shannon Stillwell, Antonio Sumlin, Jeffery Williams & Jimmy Winfrey
- Submitted: May 9, 2022
- Started: November 27, 2023
- Decided: December 3, 2024
- Verdict: Not guilty on all counts (Deamonte Kendrick) except for count 64, possession of a firearm by a convicted felon O.C.G.A. § 16-11-131 (Shannon Stillwell)
- Charge: Conspiracy to violate the Racketeer Influenced and Corrupt Organizations Act, Murder (2), Armed robbery (4), Aggravated assault with a deadly weapon (4), Possession of firearm during commission of a felony (7), Theft by receiving stolen property (2), Violation of the Georgia controlled substances act (3), Possession of a firearm by convicted felon (3), Participation in criminal street gang activity (14), Hijacking motor vehicle in the first degree (2), Possession of firearm by first offender probationer (3), Theft by taking, Attempted murder (3), Possession of weapon by incarcerated individual (2), Possession of telecommunication device by incarcerated individual, Conspiracy to commit crime (2) & Possession of firearm by convicted felon previously convicted of felony involving the use or possession of a firearm (2)

Court membership
- Judges sitting: Ural D. Glanville (recused); Shukura L. Ingram (recused); Paige Reese Whitaker

The YSL Records racketeering trial was a criminal trial in Fulton County, Georgia, involving American rapper Jeffery "Young Thug" Williams and several associates from his record label, YSL Records (Young Stoner Life Records). Prosecutors alleged that YSL operated both as a legitimate record label and as a criminal street gang under Georgia's RICO laws.

The trial began on November 27, 2023, following the May 2022 indictment of 28 individuals associated with YSL. It became one of the longest and most expensive criminal trials in Georgia history. It featured two judicial recusals and the arrest of two defense attorneys. There were intense disputes around the meaning of various phrases including the meaning of the acronym YSL, and the song lyrics of the defendant's records were found to be admissible. Several defendants, including Young Thug and Gunna, entered plea agreements during the trial, resulting in prison sentences and other conditions. Other co-defendants were acquitted. The trial ended on December 3, 2024, with the remaining jury verdicts delivered.

== Background ==
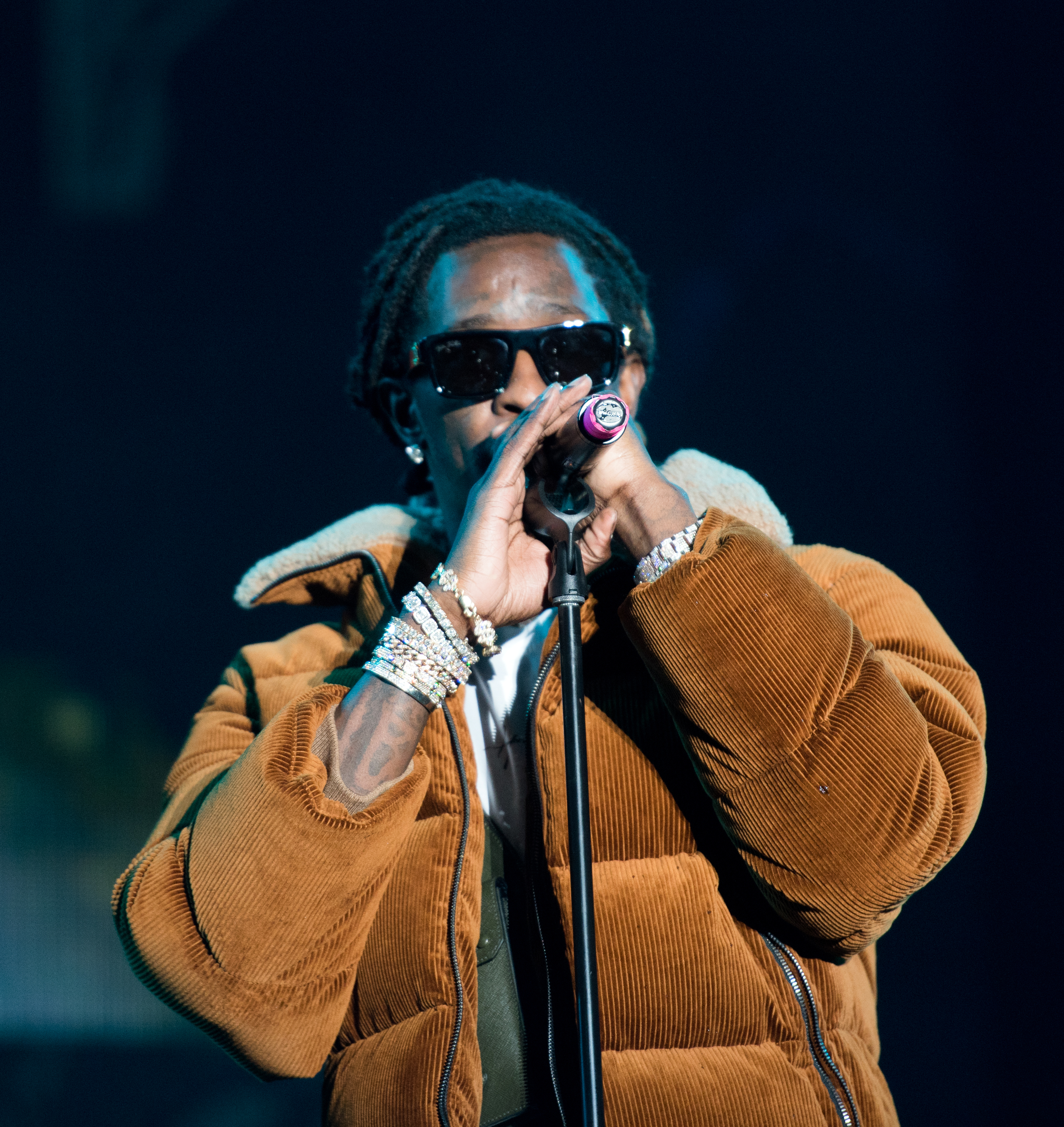
Young Thug (real name Jeffery Williams) in 2019

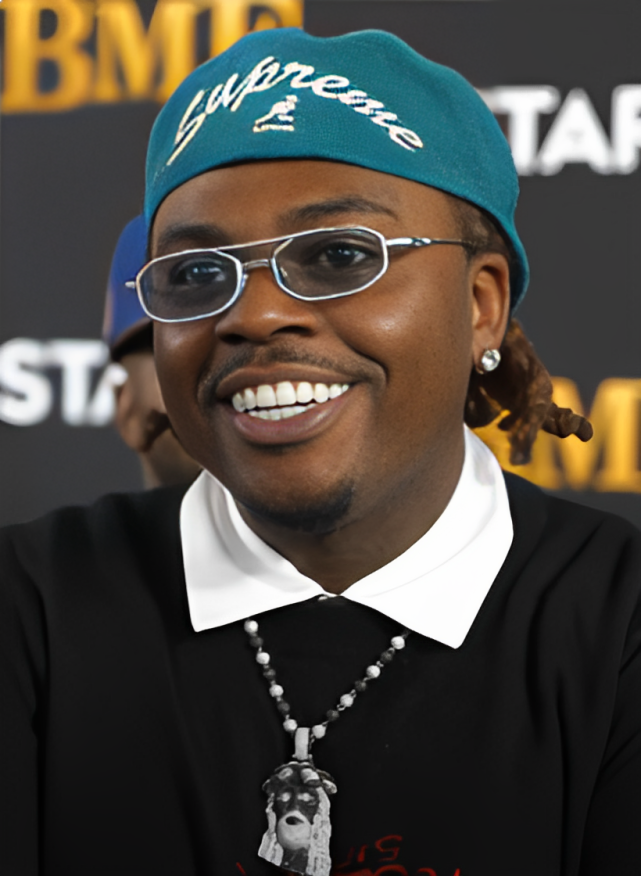
Gunna (real name Sergio Kitchens) in 2021

=== Arrests and allegations ===
On May 9, 2022, Williams was arrested in his hometown of Atlanta, Georgia, at his house in Buckhead. He was charged alongside 27 others in a 56-count RICO indictment that was filed by Fulton County District Attorney Fani Willis. Two days later, rapper Gunna (real name Sergio Kitchens), who was a part of YSL, turned himself in to authorities after a warrant for his arrest had been issued. Williams was later charged with additional gun-and-drug-related offenses after police raided his home.

=== Initial charges and judge ===
The case was presided over by Fulton County Chief Judge Ural D. Glanville, who denied bond for everybody who was charged and scheduled the trial to begin on January 9, 2023. On June 14, 2022, Gunna's 29th birthday, he wrote a letter to his fans from Fulton County Jail, in which he maintained his innocence in the case and expressed his loneliness of being locked up. On August 10, a new indictment was filed in which Thug received six more felony charges. On October 13, Thug and Gunna were again denied release from jail ahead of the trial.

== Plea deals ==
On December 14, Gunna was released from jail after he took an Alford plea, pleading guilty to a single charge of racketeering. As a result, he was sentenced to five years in prison and 500 hours of community service, in which the first year was commuted to time served and the remaining four years were suspended due to probation conditions. Following his release, some fellow rappers and many people on social media felt that he "snitched" on Thug by taking the plea deal to get out of jail.

On October 29, Quamarvious Nichols pleaded guilty to a single count of violating Georgia’s anti-racketeering laws in exchange for his other charges being dropped and was sentenced to 20 years in prison, with seven to be served and 13 years of probation. On October 30, several other individuals took plea deals in order for them to be removed from the trial. Qua pleaded guilty to racketeering conspiracy, robbery, and several other counts, to which he was sentenced to 25 years in prison with 9 to be served. Lil Rod pleaded guilty to a single racketeering conspiracy charge and was sentenced to 10 years in prison, which was commuted to time served due to him already serving a life sentence for a 2019 murder.

On Halloween, Thug accepted a plea deal. Later the same day, he was sentenced to 40 years: 5 years in prison (commuted to time served), 15 years of probation, and a backload of 20 years in prison if probation is violated. His release and probation conditions include him being banned from the Metro Atlanta area (as defined by the U.S. Census Bureau) for 10 years, not being allowed to make gang references in his music, being required to do four annual anti-gang presentations or concerts for Atlanta, and not being allowed to have any contact with known gang members or co-defendants other than Gunna and his older brother, Unfoonk (real name Quantavious Grier).

He may return to Atlanta only briefly and under strict conditions: to deliver anti-gun and anti-gang presentations to local youth four times a year or to attend the weddings, funerals, graduations, or medical emergencies of his immediate family members. He must agree to be searched at any time, undergo random drug tests, and refrain from promoting gangs in any way. His five years in prison was commuted to time served and he was released from prison the same day.

== Trial ==
=== Drug exchange in courtroom ===
On January 18, 2023, an alleged drug exchange took place in the courtroom between Thug and YSL co-defendant Kahlieff Adams, in which the latter received new charges after deputies found him in possession of the drugs Percocet, marijuana, tobacco, and other contraband. On May 11, Thug was briefly hospitalized after falling ill during a court hearing. On June 16, Gunna released his fourth studio album, A Gift & a Curse, in which he maintained his innocence and denied the "snitching" allegations against him. Exactly a week later, Thug's third studio album, Business Is Business, was released while he was in prison.

=== Admission of song lyrics ===
On November 9, Glanville ruled that song lyrics by defendants were allowed to be used as evidence. He explained his reasoning as he felt that using them is not an attack on free speech, saying that "they're not prosecuting your clients because of the songs they wrote" and "they're using the songs to prove other things your clients may have been involved in". The trial began on November 27, with the six defendants being Thug, fellow rapper and label signee Yak Gotti (real name Deamonte Kendrick), Lil Rod (real name Rodalius Ryan), Qua (real name Marquavius Huey), SB (real name Shannon Stillwell), and Quamarvious Nichols. Thug's lawyer, Brian Steel, explained that the "Thug" in the rapper's name stood for "Truly Humble Under God", in reference to his client's supposed goals of breaking his community out of poverty, in the courtroom the following day. Additionally, Steel claimed that the name of the rapper's record label, "YSL", in fact stands for "Yves Saint Laurent", in reference to the fashion styles of the group. Steel also claimed that "Pushin P", a street term and name of a song Young Thug was featured on, in fact means "Pushing Positivity." On December 10, SB was stabbed in jail after a fellow inmate named Willie Brown entered his cell. The inmate claimed that SB tried to attack him with a knife and that the stabbing was an act of self-defense.

=== Arrest of defense attorney ===
On January 3, 2024, YSL co-defendant Trontavious Stephens identified himself, Thug, and Walter Murphy as the founders of the record label, claiming that it was solely music-related and not a criminal street gang. On February 16, YSL defense attorney Nicole Fegan, who represented former co-defendant Tenquarius Mender in the case, was arrested on charges of participating in criminal street gang activity and evidence tampering. Four days later, a recording of an anonymous woman calling police played in the courtroom, where she identified Thug as the gunman in a shooting, saying: "They came to my house and told me that the guy who shot somebody's name was Young Thug, whoever that's supposed to be". On April 4, Steel filed a motion for lead prosecutor Adriane Love to be removed from the trial as he felt that she was essentially acting as an unsworn witness in order to coerce defendants into admitting to wrongdoing, which Glanville denied.

=== Defense attorney accuses judge of secret meeting with prosecutors, judge holds him in contempt ===
On June 10, Steel revealed in the courtroom that he found out that Glanville allegedly had a secret ex-parte meeting with prosecutors, along with a key witness named Lil Woody and his lawyer, Kayla Bumpus, early that morning. Steel asked Glanville why he was not told about the meeting, in response to which Glanville asked him to reveal who told him this information. Steel refused to reveal his source of information, citing the common law doctrine attorney–client privilege as a reason to not tell Glanville. Glanville disagreed with that assessment and had Steel taken into custody. Nearly an hour later, Steel was brought back into the courtroom and still declined to answer Glanville's question. Glanville then held him in contempt of court and sentenced him to 10 weekends in jail, which would have started on June 14 and ended on August 18. Steel filed a motion on the same day to appeal the ruling, which was granted and approved.

=== Judge Glanville recused ===
On June 18, 2024, Young Thug’s attorney Brian Steel filed a motion to recuse Judge Ural Glanville, claiming that the judge was "acting unethical" and had "morphed" into the role of prosecutor. Additionally, attorney Douglas S. Weinstein, representing another defendant, also filed a motion for recusal, arguing that the judge’s actions had undermined public confidence in the case.

The motions stemmed from a June 7, 2024, ex parte meeting between Judge Glanville, prosecutors, and a key witness, which the defense argued was improper. Judge Glanville initially denied the recusal motions on June 18, 2024, but the trial was paused on July 1, 2024, to allow another judge to rule on the issue.

On July 15, 2024, Judge Rachel Krause ruled that Judge Glanville had erred by not sending the recusal motion to a higher court. She granted the recusal motion from Steel and Weinstein to preserve public confidence in the judicial process and removed Glanville from the case. She denied a similar motion from attorney Kayla Bumpus, however, stating it was “moot.”

=== Replacement judge recuses herself ===
The trial then resumed under the direction of Shukura L. Ingram, who recused herself three days later due to "an improper relationship between a defendant and one of her former deputies" that caused a conflict of interest that involved her.

=== Third judge assigned ===
Paige Reese Whitaker was then assigned to the case and presided over it until it officially ended. On September 30, Whitaker chastised lead prosecutor Adriane Love due to her allegedly mishandling a witness, stating that she appeared to be "purposefully [hiding] the ball to the extent you possibly can, for as long as you possibly can [...] unless it's just that you are so unorganized that you are throwing this case together as you try it". This came after Love asked a witness to authenticate a document immediately after Whitaker had allowed her to show the document to the witness on the condition that the witness should not be asked to authenticate the document.

=== Verdicts on remaining defendants, end of trial ===
On December 3, 2024, the jury reached a verdict on the two remaining defendants Yak Gotti (Deamonte Kendrick) and SB (Shannon Stillwell). Kendrick was found not guilty on all counts. SB was found guilty only of gun possession (count 64, possession of a firearm by a convicted felon) and was sentenced to 10 years, which with credit for time served amounts to 2 years to serve with the remaining eight years served on probation. The jury was then released and the trial ended.
