= Baby oil =

Skincare product

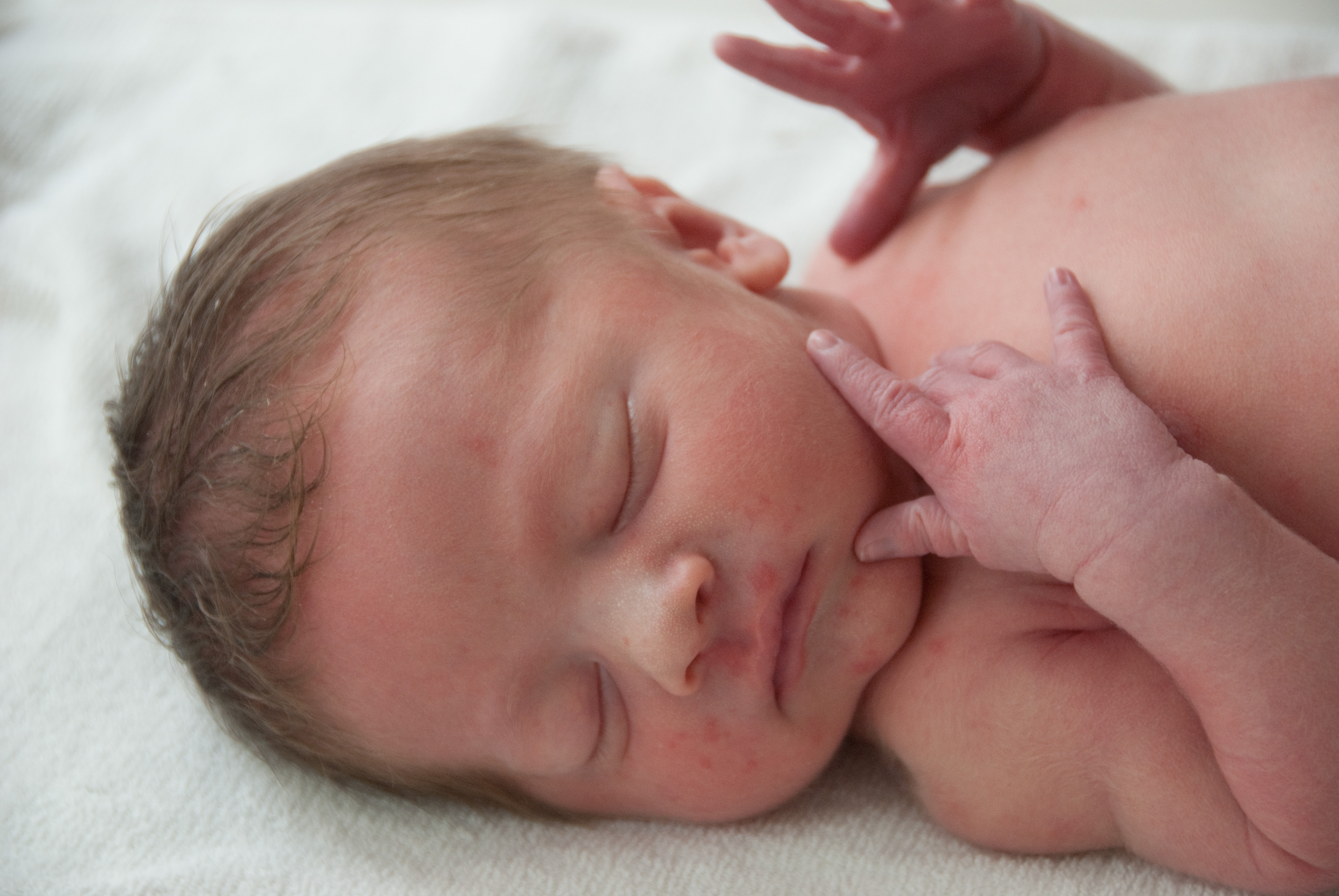
Baby oil is often used in the skin care of newborns.

Baby oil is an inert oil used to keep skin soft and supple. Named for its use on babies, it is also often used on adults for skincare and massage.

The skin of an infant, especially a premature one, is sensitive, thin, and fragile. The skin's neutral pH on the surface significantly reduces the protection against excessive bacterial growth. The epidermis and dermis are thinner than those of adults and the epidermal barrier is not yet fully developed. Consequences can for example be dry skin, infections, peeling, blister formation and poor thermoregulation. The application of different oils to the skin of the newborn is routinely practiced in many countries. In general, these oils are used for cleansing the skin, maintaining the skin's moisture, and protecting the skin's surface. Additionally, baby oil is used for the massage of newborns and as additive in lotions and creams.

== Ingredients ==
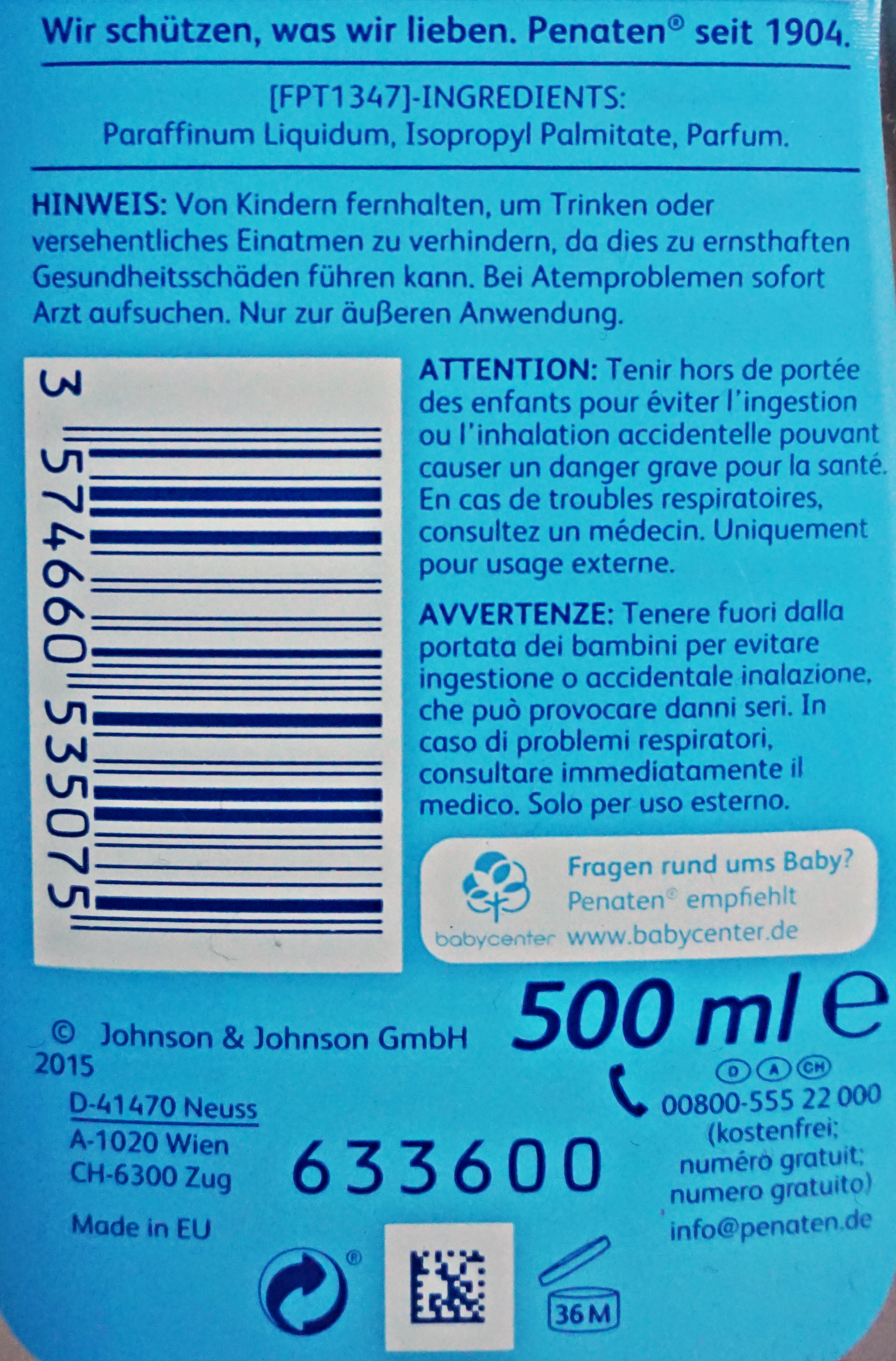
Ingredients of a baby oil product based on mineral oil: liquid paraffins, isopropyl palmitate, and fragrance ("parfum").

Some baby oils are based on mineral oil; others are based on vegetable oils.

=== Products based on mineral oil ===
Typical components of baby oils are the highly purified mineral oil products, such as liquid paraffin (INCI name: paraffinum liquidum) and petroleum jelly (INCI name: petrolatum). These compounds are odorless and tasteless, dermatologically tested and approved, anallergenic, and hydrophobic. Preservatives and antioxidants are not necessary, because, unlike vegetable oils, paraffins cannot become rancid. Nevertheless, the use of mineral oil in cosmetics is being criticized. Natural-cosmetic companies claim that mineral oil causes skin occlusion, however this is contrary to the consensus of dermatologists and cosmetic chemists, and studies have shown no statistical difference between paraffin oil and vegetable oils in skin penetration and skin occlusion. On the contrary, petrolatum-based preparations have been shown to be effective to the skin barrier function, even in premature infants.

=== Products based on vegetable oils ===
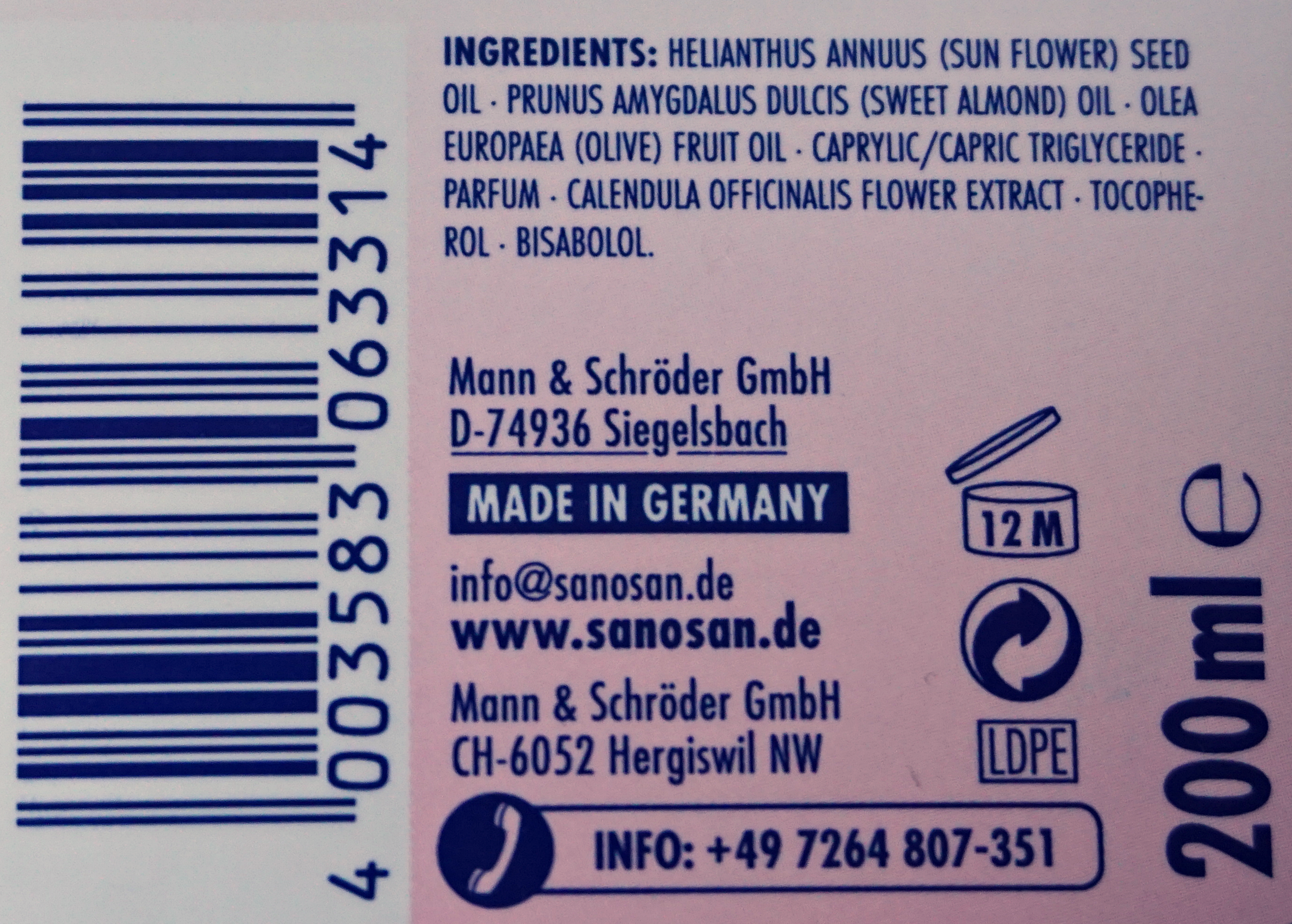
List of ingredients (INCI-code) of a baby oil based on vegetable oils

Vegetable oils are produced by plants with the highest concentration being present in seeds and fruits. About 95% of each vegetable oil is primarily composed of triglycerides. Coconut oil and palm oil contain mainly saturated fatty acids, while other oils largely contain unsaturated fatty acids, for example oleic acid and linoleic acid. Accompanying substances in vegetable oils are, inter alia, phospholipids, glycolipids, sulfolipids, squalene, carotenoids, vitamin E, polyphenols and triterpene alcohols. To avoid rancidity, preservatives or antioxidants are added to baby oils based on vegetable oils. On cosmetic products, these oils are listed according to the International Nomenclature of Cosmetic Ingredients (INCI), e.g.:

- Cocos nucifera oil (coconut oil)
- Elaeis guineensis oil (palm oil)
- Glycine soja oil (soy oil)
- Olea europaea oil (olive oil)
- Persea gratissima oil (avocado oil)
- Prunus amygdalus dulcis oil (almond oil)
- Shea butter glycerides (shea butter)
- Simmondsia chinensis oil (jojoba oil)
- Helianthus annuus seed oil (sunflower oil)

Vegetable oils are not to be confused with essential oils, both being sourced from plants.

== Usage ==
Baby oils are largely used as skin care products and their principal use remains as skin moisturizers. In particular, baby oils find application in the treatment of various skin diseases like atopic dermatitis, xerosis, psoriasis and other eczematous conditions. Another area of use is the oil massage of the newborn which has been a tradition in India and other Asian countries since time immemorial.

In addition to its principal usage, liquid paraffin-based baby oil is commonly used in the automotive maintenance industry as a fuel for diagnostic smoke test machines, which generate smoke used to detect leaks in engine induction systems, brake system, manifolds, gaskets and similar sealed systems. When heated to approximately 300°C in a low oxygen environment, liquid paraffin creates a thick and visible smoke which is injected into the sealed system. Leaks in a system can easily be found by observing the place at which smoke escapes.

During the 2024 investigations of Sean "Diddy" Combs, investigators reportedly found 1,000 bottles of baby oil at Combs' house in Miami, presumably for use as a lubricant. This absurd quantity of oil led to a number of internet memes about the product.
