= Slime Season 2 =

- Original album cover. Reissue is more zoomed out.

Mixtape by Young Thug
- Released: October 31, 2015
- Recorded: 2014–2015
- Genres: Hip hop; trap
- Length: 82:32
- Label: Self-released
- Producers: Alex Tumay; C4; Goose; Isaac Flame; Joe McLaren; London on da Track; Metro Boomin; Ricky Racks; Southside; Supah Mario; Treasure Fingers; TM88; Wheezy

Young Thug chronology
Slime Season (2015)	Slime Season 2 (2015)	I'm Up (2016)

Singles from Slime Season 2
- 1. "Thief in the Night" Released: October 31, 2015

Slime Season 2 is the eighth self-released mixtape by American rapper Young Thug. It was released on October 31, 2015, as the second installment in the Slime Season series, which compiled mostly leaked and unreleased material dating back at least a year. It features production from London on da Track, Wheezy, Metro Boomin and Ricky Racks, among others. The project enlists guest features from Lil Uzi Vert, Trouble, Shad Da God, Yak Gotti, Rich Homie Quan and Birdman. On December 25, 2024, the mixtape was released through YSL Records and 300 Entertainment on streaming media.

== Background ==
In September 2015, Young Thug released the 18-track Slime Season mixtape for free digital download. Its sequel, Slime Season 2, was released only a month later through the same platforms. The trilogy was completed with Slime Season 3 (2016), which received a commercial release.

== Critical reception ==
Professional ratings
Aggregate scores
Source	Rating
Metacritic	81/100
Review scores
Source	Rating
Consequence of Sound	B
Pitchfork	7.9/10
Spin	8/10
Tiny Mix Tapes	4/5

Slime Season 2 received widespread acclaim from critics. At Metacritic, which assigns a normalized rating out of 100 to reviews from mainstream publications, the album received an average score of 81, based on four reviews, which indicates "universal acclaim". Meaghan Garvey of Pitchfork stated that Slime Season 2 was "a more carefully constructed work than its predecessor in every sense" and "presents him instead as a storyteller in the magical realist tradition, drawing glimmers of nonplussed fascination out of the rational world. Within this context, his habit for working in small-scale, occasionally disjointed bursts, recording each line spontaneously, makes perfect sense. His thoughts fracture and wander down unpredictable paths, forcing us to draw connections in non-linear ways."

Paul Thompson of Spin commented that Slime Season 2 "continues to give context and direction as to the rapper's wealth of unorganized material. This time, it's constructed with more precision, playing out as one long crescendo. As always, Thug is wildly inventive with the form, pulling melodies out of thin air and rapping like the walls are closing in. Slime Season 2 gives him ample negative space to do so."

== Track listing ==
No.	Title	Producer(s)	Length
1.	"Big Racks" (featuring Lil Uzi Vert)	Southside	4:08
2.	"Thief in the Night" (featuring Trouble)	C4; Supah Mario	3:39
3.	"Don't Know" (featuring Shad da God)	London on da Track	3:02
4.	"Hey I"	London on da Track	3:27
5.	"She Notice"	Wheezy	3:25
6.	"All Over"	Southside; TM88; Metro Boomin	3:06
7.	"Twerk It"	Isaac Flame	3:49
8.	"Phoenix"	Goose	3:58
9.	"I'll Tell You What"	Ricky Racks; Wheezy	3:35
10.	"Mind Right"	Wheezy	3:51
11.	"Go Crazy"	Goose	3:38
12.	"Pull Up on a Kid" (featuring Yak Gotti)	Wheezy	3:39
13.	"Up"	Wheezy	3:35
14.	"Bout (Damn) Time"	London on da Track	3:20
15.	"Flaws"	Isaac Flame	3:52
16.	"Oh Lord"	Ricky Racks; TM88	4:06
17.	"Beast"	Wheezy; Joe McLaren	3:46
18.	"Never Made Love" (featuring Rich Homie Quan)	London on da Track	4:36
19.	"Raw (Might Just)"	Treasure Fingers	3:30
20.	"No No No (Bonus Track)" (featuring Birdman)	London on da Track	3:34
21.	"My Baby (Bonus Track)"	Goose	4:08
22.	"Love Me Forever (Chopped & Screwed) (Bonus Track)"	London on da Track; Alex Tumay	4:57
Total length:			82:32

== Charts ==
Weekly chart performance for Slime Season 2
Chart (2025)	Peak position
Hungarian Physical Albums (MAHASZ)	16
