= Alex Tumay =

American audio engineer

- Born: Alexander Tumay; July 19, 1986 (age 40); Queens, New York
- Origin: Atlanta, Georgia
- Genres: Hip hop; trap; pop; R&B; experimental; soul; Experimental pop
- Occupations: Audio engineer; mixing engineer; sound designer; DJ; record producer; songwriter
- Instruments: Pro Tools; Logic Pro; Final Cut Pro; piano; guitar; turntables
- Years active: 2010–present
- Label: That Sounds Better
- Website: http://www.alextumay.com

Alexander Tumay (born July 19, 1986) is an American audio engineer and DJ from Atlanta, Georgia. He has recorded and mixed songs for major artists across the American hip hop industry, including Young Thug, Travis Scott, Future, Kanye West, Drake, and 21 Savage. He won a Grammy award for engineering the track "This Is America" by Childish Gambino.

== Early life ==
Alexander Tumay was born on July 19, 1986, in Queens, New York City, New York. He is of Armenian and Puerto Rican descent. He was raised in Fort Lauderdale, Florida, for most of his teen years. He learned to play piano and guitar growing up, as Tumay's father is a classical pianist, which influenced him to do so. He also listened to hip hop and heavy metal. He was in his high school's band and in small garage bands.

Tumay struggled to find a college major that met his desires, ultimately switching between eight or nine majors before dropping out. He then worked various restaurant jobs, including as a pizza delivery driver for Domino's Pizza. A friend introduced him to Logic Pro, a digital audio workstation program, sparking his interest, though he initially struggled to understand how to use it. This experience inspired him to enroll in Full Sail University in Winter Park, Florida, just a month later, to study audio engineering. Tumay graduated from the Full Sail in 2010 with a bachelor's degree in recording arts, and then scored an internship at Maze Studios in Atlanta, Georgia, to where he later relocated, and worked frequently with another record producer, Ben H. Allen, who taught Tumay more about recording and mixing for an additional three years. He also assisted Allen on projects for the experimental pop band Animal Collective and experimental musician Youth Lagoon, before fully going into working in the hip hop genre.

== Career ==
Tumay visited many recording studios around Atlanta with his résumé looking for another internship, and got one as a technician at DARP Studios (later renamed as UAMG Studios) through his manager, Monica Tannian, due to his work with Allen. As he was in DARP Studios often, he got the opportunity to work with major artists such as T.I., Waka Flocka Flame, PartyNextDoor, and Tinashe, among others. In 2012, he met Metro Boomin at UAMG Studios, which lead to Tumay working with more artists and record producers such as Young Thug, Rich Homie Quan, Migos, DJ Spinz, Southside, TM88, 808 Mafia, Sonny Digital, and many more.

Tumay is Young Thug's personal and most trusted recording and mixing engineer. He met Thug in early 2013, and the first song they worked together on was "Some More" from Metro Boomin's debut mixtape 19 & Boomin' , on which he also mixed most of the songs and executive produced it. Metro approached Tumay and asked him to record that song due to Thug having issues with his former recording and mixing engineer, whom Thug removed from that studio session. Tumay has been working with Thug closely ever since, as well with Metro Boomin and more recently, 21 Savage, for which Tumay recorded and mixed their debut EP, Savage Mode.

== Selected engineering discography ==
- 19 and Boomin – Metro Boomin
- Days Before Rodeo – Travis Scott
- Rodeo – Travis Scott
- Barter 6 – Young Thug
- Slime Season – Young Thug
- Slime Season 2 – Young Thug (also a producer on "Love Me Forever (Chopped & Screwed)" with London on da Track)
- I'm Up – Young Thug
- Paperwork – T.I.
- Remember My Name – Lil Durk
- Slime Season 3 – Young Thug
- The Life of Pablo – Kanye West
- Savage Mode – Metro Boomin and 21 Savage
- Jeffery – Young Thug
- Beautiful Thugger Girls – Young Thug
- Issa Album – 21 Savage
- Camila – Camila Cabello
- Slime Language – Young Thug
- On the Rvn – Young Thug
- So Much Fun – Young Thug
- "Sum Bout U" – 645AR featuring FKA Twigs
