= On the Rvn =

EP by Young Thug
- Released: September 24, 2018
- Recorded: 2016–2018
- Studios: Crosby; PatchWerk
- Length: 20:58
- Labels: 300; Atlantic
- Producers: London on da Track; Cubeatz; Wheezy; Keyyz; Outtatown; Supah Mario; Stelios

Young Thug chronology
Slime Language (2018)	On the Rvn (2018)	So Much Fun (2019)

On the Run (also stylized as On the Rvn depending on the platform) is the second extended play by American rapper Young Thug. It was released on September 24, 2018, by 300 Entertainment and Atlantic Records to streaming platforms. It features collaborations with 6lack, Jaden Smith, Elton John, T-Shyne, and Offset and follows a month after Thug's compilation album Slime Language.

== Background ==
On the Rvn was originally expected to be released on September 11, the same day that Young Thug turned himself into authorities for DeKalb County police in Georgia after a warrant was put out for his arrest for possession of and intent to distribute various drugs, as well as possession of a firearm. It was also originally supposed to be his debut studio album. Although he had submitted the mixes before turning himself in, audio engineer and Thug's associate Alex Tumay stated that the clearance for the tracks would take time. Thug was later released on bond.

After his release, Thug teased the project on Instagram, releasing a video teaser featuring footage of news reports referencing the warrant. Thug then announced On the Rvn would be released at midnight on September 24.

On August 21, 2018, a song by Young Thug remixing Elton John's "Rocket Man" was leaked online. Upon receiving warm reception, the song was released as the final song on the EP as "High" featuring Elton John.

When the EP was released, guest features from Offset and T-Shyne were accidentally left off. T-Shyne's verse on "Real in My Veins" was added on 26 September.

== Track listing ==
Adapted from iTunes.

No.	Title	Producer(s)	Length
1.	"On the Run" (featuring Offset)	London on da Track; Cubeatz	4:23
2.	"Icey"	Wheezy; Keyyz; Outtatown	3:52
3.	"Climax" (featuring 6lack)	London on da Track	3:09
4.	"Sin" (featuring Jaden Smith)	London on da Track	3:22
5.	"Real in My Veins" (featuring T-Shyne)	Supah Mario	4:10
6.	"High" (featuring Elton John)	Stelios	3:15
Total length:			22:11

Sample credits

- "High" contains a sample of "Rocket Man (I Think It's Going to Be a Long, Long Time)" as performed by Elton John, written by Elton John and Bernie Taupin.

== Personnel ==
- Alex Tumay – mixing
- London on da Track – additional mixing
- Joe LaPorta – mastering
- Bainz – recording ("On the Run", "Icey" and "Climax")
- Shaan Singh – recording ("Sin")
- Stafa – recording ("High")

== Charts ==
Chart (2018)	Peak position
Canadian Albums (Billboard)	27
Norwegian Albums (VG-lista)	24
Swedish Albums (Sverigetopplistan)	56
US Billboard 200	17
US Top R&B/Hip-Hop Albums (Billboard)	13
