= Jeffery (mixtape) =

Mixtape by Young Thug
- Released: August 26, 2016
- Genres: Hip-hop; trap; pop; psychedelic rap
- Length: 42:15
- Labels: 300; Atlantic
- Producers: Billboard Hitmakers; Cassius Jay; Goose; Jeffery; Supah Mario; TM88; Wheezy

Young Thug chronology
Slime Season 3 (2016)	Jeffery (2016)	Beautiful Thugger Girls (2017)

Singles from Jeffery
- 1. "Pick Up the Phone" Released: June 3, 2016; 2. "Wyclef Jean" Released: January 24, 2017

Jeffery (originally titled No, My Name is Jeffery) is the fourth commercial mixtape by American rapper Young Thug. It was released on August 26, 2016, by 300 Entertainment and Atlantic Records. The mixtape features guest appearances from Travis Scott, Gucci Mane, Gunna, Quavo, Offset, and Wyclef Jean. It also features production from TM88, Wheezy, and Young Thug himself (credited as his first name/album namesake Jeffery).

Jeffery charted at number eight on the US Billboard 200, and received widespread acclaim from critics. Its artwork, which features Young Thug in a dress, went viral. The mixtape was named among the best releases of 2016 by several publications, including Pitchfork, Fact, Complex, and Rolling Stone.

== Background ==
Jeffery was announced on July 9, 2016, via Young Thug's Instagram, along with previews of new music. It was initially slated for release on August 16, coinciding with Young Thug's birthday, but was pushed back. The mixtape was accompanied by his decision to abandon the stage name Young Thug in favor of the new moniker No, My Name is Jeffery, or simply his birth name Jeffery. The change of stage name was announced by his manager Lyor Cohen in the preparation for the mixtape's release. According to Young Thug, "Jeffery is all about Jeffery. It ain't even about Young Thug. Ain't no Young Thug songs on there. The mixtape is a straight crossover." On Beats 1, he clarified that the name change was only for one week, unless the mixtape sold 100,000 copies.

The second track, "Floyd Mayweather", was originally supposed to be featured on a Gunna project. With the exception of "Pick Up the Phone", each track was named after one of Young Thug's idols, including Gucci Mane ("Guwop"), Wyclef Jean ("Wyclef Jean"), Rihanna ("RiRi"), Future ("Future Swag"), Harambe, the gorilla killed at the Cincinnati Zoo in May 2016, and Kanye West ("Kanye West").

== Composition ==
The opening track, "Wyclef Jean", is named after the Haitian rapper. It features Young Thug ad-libbing and crooning sexual boasts over a half-time reggae beat produced by TM88 and Supah Mario. The song contains horns, a Jamaican-sounding backing chant, and is driven by a groovy bassline. Young Thug's vocal delivery on its bridge is soulful, while his delivery on its hook is nasal. Scott Glaysher of XXL magazine wrote that the beat had "a distinct Caribbean vibe", and felt that it sounded like something Wyclef Jean himself could rap over. "Floyd Mayweather", the second track, is named after the American boxer Floyd Mayweather. It has a runtime of six minutes, and features rappers Gunna, Gucci Mane, and Travis Scott. A trap song, it was produced by Goose, TM88, Wheezy, Billboard Hitmakers, and Young Thug himself. The track's beat is melodic, featuring hi-hats, drums, and wavering synths. Lyrically, the song is about showing off wealth. It features Auto-Tuned vocals and, like the opening track, sexual boasting. The third track, "Swizz Beatz", is a sonically pop-leaning "self-love song", according to HipHopDX. Produced by Wheezy, it is named after the American rapper and record producer Swizz Beatz. Vocally, the song features howls, yips, and yodel-sounding delivery from Young Thug.

The following track, "Future Swag", is named after and sonically inspired by American rapper Future. It was produced by TM88, and features repetition, ad-libs, and alternating rhythms. The song contains an impression of Future, with Young Thug imitating his voice and flow. The fifth track, "RiRi", and is named after Barbadian singer Rihanna. Produced by Wheezy, "RiRi" sees Young Thug mimicking Rihanna's vocal inflections and proclaiming his admiration for her. His repetition of "earn" during the hook is in reference to her 2016 single "Work". His falsetto delivery of the hook features voice cracks, similar to Rihanna's vocals in "Work". Young Thug's vocal performance during the song has elements of pop, R&B, and Caribbean tonalities. "Guwop", the sixth track, features rappers Quavo, Offset, and Young Scooter. It is named after Gucci Mane, and was produced by Cassius Jay, TM88, and Wheezy. The song has an unconventional ambient trap beat, with The Guardian's Lanre Bakare comparing it to the style of producer Suicideyear.

The seventh track is named after Harambe, a gorilla who lived at the Cincinnati Zoo until he was killed in 2016. Young Thug's raspy, guttural vocal performance on the song drew comparisons to Harambe as well as singer Louis Armstrong. Lyrically, the song is about having sex and aiming guns. The beat, which was produced by Billboard Hitmakers, incorporates strings and is driven by piano. The eighth track is named after the rapper Webbie. The song features rapper Duke, and consists of boastful lyrics about sex, drugs, and expensive watches. The beat, which was produced by Billboard Hitmakers, was described by Bakare as sounding like it samples Kanye West's song "Real Friends" (2016). The final track is named after Kanye West. The song was produced by Cassius Jay and Wheezy, and features surging synths and buzzing 808s. The track's hook consists of a scat-like vocal chant. Lyrically, it is an ode to Young Thug's fiancée. The song has a guest appearance from Wyclef Jean, who coos "Jeffery" in the background of the song and performs a verse.

== Artwork ==
The cover features Young Thug wearing a frilly light blue dress, with an umbrella-like hat covering his face. According to The Fader, he "strikes a pose reminiscent of the dancing woman emoji." Young Thug compared the dress to that of Raiden, a character from the video game series Mortal Kombat. Alessandro Trincone, the designer of the dress, said that it was inspired by androgyny and Japanese kimonos.

Young Thug originally held a photoshoot for the cover art in Atlanta, but was dissatisfied with the results. During a meeting in New York with Julie Anne Quay, the founder of the fashion platform VFiles, Young Thug was shown the dress, and immediately decided to use it for Jeffery's cover art. The final photoshoot took several hours due to the intricacies of the dress.

In the Pitchfork review of Jeffery, Sheldon Pearce wrote that "the cover exhibits some of Thug’s strongest artistic traits: His eye for composition and stylishness, and his knack for testing limits and hurdling norms." Young Thug had previously modeled women's clothing for a Calvin Klein ad campaign. He later addressed Jeffery's cover art, stating "Stop believing in genders."

== Release and promotion ==
The song "Kanye West" (originally titled "Elton" and then later "Pop Man") featuring Wyclef Jean, was released on August 19, 2016. The mixtape release was then preceded by a short album trailer released on August 23, which depicted Young Thug being interrogated about his name by the authorities.

The mixtape's lead single, "Pick Up the Phone" featuring American rappers Travis Scott and Quavo, was released on June 3, 2016, the song peaked at number 43 on the US Billboard Hot 100. "Wyclef Jean" was sent to urban contemporary radio on January 24, 2017, as the mixtape's second single, it peaked at number 87 on the Billboard Hot 100.

== Critical reception ==
Professional ratings
Aggregate scores
Source	Rating
AnyDecentMusic?	7.4/10
Metacritic	82/100
Review scores
Source	Rating
AllMusic	4/5 stars
Exclaim!	8/10
The Guardian	3/5 stars
HipHopDX	3.9/5
Now	4/5
Pitchfork	8.5/10
PopMatters	8/10
Rolling Stone	4/5 stars
Vice (Expert Witness)	A−
XXL	3/5 ("L")

Jeffery was met with widespread critical acclaim. At Metacritic, which assigns a normalized rating out of 100 to reviews from mainstream publications, the mixtape received an average score of 82, based on 11 reviews. Aggregator AnyDecentMusic? gave it 7.4 out of 10, based on their assessment of the critical consensus.

AllMusic's Neil Z. Yeung called the mixtape "thrilling and essential, one of the best rap releases of 2016", writing that "there's enough freshness here to make it his most exciting and mainstream release to date". Daniel Bromfield from Pretty Much Amazing described it as "a more satisfying major-label rap album than most mixtape-bred rappers ever make", asserting that "despite being more extreme in many ways than his prior work, Jeffery is his poppiest tape since 2014's Tha Tour with Rich Gang". PopMatters critic Brian Duricy stated that "as a collection of songs, it's his most realized set to date". Rolling Stone's Jody Rosen stated that "it's Thug's own sound that predominates: the heroic howls, rasps, mumbles and wheezes of a man who is as captivating a vocalist as any in pop".

For MTV News, Meaghan Garvey wrote that "Jeffery, like ATLiens 20 years prior, has that unqualifiable, absolute feeling of arrival", describing it as "irrepressible, bursting with uncannily memorable one-liners and dynamic experiments in flow and cadence over beats that, attached to a more easily marketable rapper, could be obvious radio hits". Pitchfork's Sheldon Pearce described it as "rangy and stunning, an exciting new curve in the fascinating Young Thug arc", stating that "Thug understands the modern pop song construction better than anyone: anything and everything can be a hook". Robert Christgau wrote in Vice that Young Thug "makes black comedy out of irrepressible sound", stating that "his hoohoos and melismas and blahs and mwas and frogcroaks and put-puts are the message". In a less enthusiastic review, Lanre Bakare of The Guardian described it as "a mixtape that features gems among run-of-the-mill trap fodder" while praising the single "Pick Up the Phone" as "an example of all the things Young Thug excels at coming together on one track".

=== Year-end lists ===
Select year-end rankings of Jeffery
Publication	List	Rank	Ref.
Complex	The 50 Best Albums of 2016	13	
Consequence	Top 50 Albums of 2016	45	
Entertainment Weekly	The 50 Best Albums of 2016	36	
Fact	The 50 Best Albums of 2016	19	
The Guardian	The Best Albums of 2016	25	
Pitchfork	The 50 Best Albums of 2016	21	
PopMatters	The 70 Best Albums of 2016	54	
Rolling Stone	50 Best Albums of 2016	10	
Spin	The 50 Best Albums of 2016	17	
Variance	50 Best Albums of 2016	29	

== Commercial performance ==
Jeffery debuted at number eight on the US Billboard 200 and number five on the US Top R&B/Hip-Hop Albums, with 37,000 album-equivalent units and sold 18,000 copies in its first week. This is Thug's third debut in the top 40 and his second in the top 10.

== Track listing ==
Jeffery track listing
No.	Title	Writer(s)	Producer(s)	Length
1.	"Wyclef Jean"	Jeffery Williams; Larry Griffin Jr.; Christopher Thornton; Diondria Thornton; Jonathan Priester	TM88; Supah Mario	3:56
2.	"Floyd Mayweather" (featuring Travis Scott, Gucci Mane and Gunna)	Williams; Jacques Webster II; Radric Davis; Sergio Kitchens; Wesley Glass; Bryan Simmons; Eduardo Burgess; Jonathan De La Rosa; Devante Wilkes	Jeffery; Wheezy; TM88; Billboard Hitmakers; Goose	6:01
3.	"Swizz Beatz"	Williams; Glass	Wheezy	3:16
4.	"Future Swag"	Williams; Simmons	TM88	2:45
5.	"RiRi"	Williams; Burgess; De La Rosa	Billboard Hitmakers	4:04
6.	"Guwop" (featuring Quavo, Offset and Young Scooter)	Williams; Quavious Marshall; Kiari Cephus; Kenneth Bailey; Glass; Josh Cross; Simmons	Wheezy; Cassius Jay; TM88	5:15
7.	"Harambe"	Williams; Burgess; De La Rosa	Billboard Hitmakers	3:10
8.	"Webbie" (featuring Lil Duke)	Williams; Arnold Martinez; Burgess; De La Rosa	Billboard Hitmakers	3:55
9.	"Kanye West" (featuring Wyclef Jean)	Williams; Wyclef Jean; Glass	Wheezy; Cassius Jay	5:41
10.	"Pick Up the Phone" (Bonus track) (with Travis Scott featuring Quavo)	Williams; Webster; Marshall; Brittany Hazzard; Allen Ritter; Anderson Hernandez; Adam Feeney; Mike Dean	Ritter; Vinylz; Frank Dukes; Maneesh Bidaye; Mick Schultz; Dean	4:12
Total length:				42:18

Notes

- "Kanye West" was formerly known as "Pop Man"

== Personnel ==
Credits adapted from the mixtape's liner notes.

Musicians

- Young Thug (Note: Credited both as Young Thug and his birth name, Jeffrey Williams.) – vocals (all tracks), programming (2)
- TM88 – programming (1, 2, 4, 6)
- Supah Mario – programming (1)
- Billboard Hitmakers – programming (2, 5, 7, 8)
- Goose – programming (2)
- Wheezy – programming (2, 3, 6, 9)
- Cassius Jay – programming (6, 9)

Technical

- Young Thug – executive producer
- Joe LaPorta – mastering engineer
- Alexander Tumay – mixing engineer

== Charts ==
=== Weekly charts ===
Chart performance for Jeffery
Chart (2016)	Peak position
Belgian Albums (Ultratop Flanders)	191
Belgian Albums (Ultratop Wallonia)	77
Canadian Albums (Billboard)	19
Dutch Albums (Album Top 100)	54
French Albums (SNEP)	131
New Zealand Heatseeker Albums (RMNZ)	5
UK R&B Albums (Official Charts)	23
US Billboard 200	8
US Top R&B/Hip-Hop Albums (Billboard)	5

=== Year-end charts ===
2016 year-end chart performance for Jeffery
Chart (2016)	Position
US Top R&B/Hip-Hop Albums (Billboard)	95
