= Chanel (Go Get It) =

2018 song by Young Thug featuring Gunna and Lil Baby

Song by Young Thug featuring Gunna and Lil Baby

from the album Slime Language
- Released: August 17, 2018
- Genre: Trap
- Length: 3:21
- Label: YSL; 300
- Songwriters: Jeffery Williams; Sergio Kitchens; Dominique Jones; Wesley Glass; Corey French; Simon Christensen
- Producers: Wheezy; SinGrinch (co.); Psymun (co.)

Music video
- "Chanel (Go Get It)" on YouTube

"Chanel (Go Get It)" is a song by American rapper Young Thug featuring American rappers Gunna and Lil Baby. It is a track from record label YSL Records' debut collaborative compilation album Slime Language (2018). The song was produced by Wheezy, SinGrinch and Psymun.

== Composition ==
The song features a "hollowness that contorts around shaky hi-hats a warped horn sound, and a sprinkling of keys". It finds the rappers singing about being eager to buy their respective women luxurious clothes, cars and other products when they want them.

== Critical reception ==
In an XXL review of Slime Language, Charles Holmes wrote that the song was "fascinating" because it "shows the endless permutations and offshoots of Thug's style", also adding, "Both feature artists have adopted their musical father's mushed-mouth melodic delivery, but where Gunna's flow rambles and elongates the last word of each bar, Baby assaults the beat with a clipped, rushed and bludgeoning flow." Patrick Lyons of HotNewHipHop wrote that "Lil Baby sounds effortless as ever" and "Gunna is stellar throughout" in the song.

== Music video ==
The music video was released on November 26, 2018. Directed by Elliot Sellers and Sam Shea, it begins with a python unraveling to reveal itself covering a sleeping Young Thug's head. The three artists appear in an Atlanta parking lot at nighttime, where surrounding buildings warp, and a car melts. They then roam a forest where trees, branches and rocks are twisting out of shape or melting. The snake from earlier follows the rappers in the forest, growing in size as the video progresses, and eats Lil Baby.

== Charts ==
Chart (2018)	Peak position
Canada Hot 100 (Billboard)	92
US Billboard Hot 100	78
US Hot R&B/Hip-Hop Songs (Billboard)	31

== Certifications ==
Region	Certification	Certified units/sales
Canada (Music Canada)	Platinum	80,000^{‡}
New Zealand (RMNZ)	Gold	15,000^{‡}
United Kingdom (BPI)	Silver	200,000^{‡}
United States (RIAA)	Platinum	1,000,000^{‡}
^{‡} Sales+streaming figures based on certification alone.
