= Solid (Young Thug and Gunna song) =

2021 song by Young Stoner Life, Young Thug and Gunna featuring Drake

Song by Young Stoner Life, Young Thug and Gunna featuring Drake

from the album Slime Language 2
- Released: April 16, 2021
- Genre: Trap
- Length: 3:53
- Label: YSL; 300
- Songwriters: Jeffery Williams; Sergio Kitchens; Aubrey Graham; Ozan Yıldırım; Wesley Glass; Michael Hernandez; Elias Sticken
- Producers: Wheezy; OZ; Foreign Teck; Elyas

Audio video
- "Solid" on YouTube

"Solid" is a song released by American record label Young Stoner Life with American rappers Young Thug and Gunna featuring Canadian rapper Drake. It was released on April 16, 2021, as the fourth track from the main artist's second compilation album, Slime Language 2. A melodic trap song, it sees the rappers delivering verses about their relationship issues and the trust issues that stem from it. The song was originally intended for Drake's sixth album, Certified Lover Boy, as a collaboration between him and Gunna only.

== Background ==
"Solid" was originally meant to appear on Drake's Certified Lover Boy, as Gunna explained in an interview with Billboard, "Drake had originally sent me the song for his album and I did it and we was vibing with it for a minute". Because Drake's album was postponed, Gunna asked and convinced Drake to let the song be part of Slime Language 2 instead. Young Thug then added his verse. The song marks the fourth collaboration between Thug and Drake, with "D4L" from Drake's 2020 project, Dark Lane Demo Tapes, having been the most recent.

== Composition ==
Deemed a "chilled-out, melodic effort", the song's pre-chorus is led by Gunna, with Drake performing the chorus and first verse, which leads into Gunna's verse, while Young Thug appears towards the song's end, in "a seamless transition". Drake raps about his "questionable" interactions with a woman he is romantically involved with, whom he meets up with in London. He reveals that he found out she was lying to him about a man she used to be with, and calls her version of events "night and day". Drake further reflects on the woman only wanting him for his money and materialistic things: "She want a demon, yeah / She want a ring or some sort of arrangement, yeah", referencing a Dodge Demon. He also criticizes those who change their image and "act hard", but in reality are really "innocent". He ends his verse, rapping "Hop in a tank and move militant", a mention to his tank-shaped G650 Maybach Landaulet, the only one in Canada. Similarly, Gunna raps about his own "romantic qualms". Writing for The Root, Bella Morais wrote: "The song features very traditional trap sounds but carries a different feel because Drake, Young Thug and Gunna have similar flows but the melody behind each verse changes, making each voice feel as if it were seamlessly cut together from different songs.

== Critical reception ==
Billboard's Cydney Lee called it a "standout hit" off Slime Language 2. In their album review, Pitchfork's Mehan Jayasuriya named the song as one "designed to go off during the summer", writing: "'Solid' feels by turns like a Drake song, a Gunna song and a Thug song, each rapper fully commanding the shifting, distant beat". NME's Kyann-Sian Williams praised Drake's abilities as a guest artist, opining that even though the singer's intro on the track sounds "out of place", he finishes his part in his "pioneering, melodic flow". Williams further stated that the song "is still going to be blasted on rap playlists and in DJ sets to come, but might have been an even bigger hit with a tighter edit". In their ranking of each guest verse on the album, Alphonse Pierre of Pitchfork listed Drake 14th, and wrote, "Drake's contribution on 'Solid' is as catchy and replayable as you'd expect". Exclaim! called the song "aptly titled" and said it "will undoubtedly be blasting through car sound systems across North America this summer". Uproxx's Aaron Williams said "Solid", along with "Ski", are the album's "obvious standouts", while singling out how Gunna "makes the most of his established chemistry with Drake". The song was noted as being a fan favorite, with HotNewHipHop's Erika Marie writing: "Thugger, Gunna, and Drake melodically move their way through 'Solid', produced by OZ, and in true form, this one isn't just a standout but a hit among fans".

== Chart performance ==
"Solid" was the highest debut on the US Rolling Stone Top 100, entering at number three with 21.1 million streams. It charted along with eight other tracks from Slime Language 2, including "Ski", which debuted at number nine. "Solid" also debuted at number 12 on the US Billboard Hot 100 and number six on the US Hot R&B/Hip-Hop Songs charts. In addition, the song also debuted at number 11 on the Billboard's Global 200 chart. On August 4, 2021, the song was certified gold by the Recording Industry Association of America (RIAA) for combined sales and streaming equivalent units of over 500,000 units in the United States.

== Charts ==
=== Weekly charts ===
Weekly chart performance for "Solid"
Chart (2021)	Peak position
Austria (Ö3 Austria Top 40)	68
Canada Hot 100 (Billboard)	8
Germany (GfK)	92
Global 200 (Billboard)	11
Ireland (IRMA)	42
Lithuania (AGATA)	49
Netherlands (Single Top 100)	90
New Zealand Hot Singles (RMNZ)	1
Portugal (AFP)	82
Switzerland (Schweizer Hitparade)	38
UK Singles (OCC)	36
US Billboard Hot 100	12
US Hot R&B/Hip-Hop Songs (Billboard)	6
US Rolling Stone Top 100	3

=== Year-end charts ===
Year-end chart performance for "Solid"
Chart (2021)	Position
US Hot R&B/Hip-Hop Songs (Billboard)	82

== Certifications ==
Certifications for "Solid"
Region	Certification	Certified units/sales
Canada (Music Canada)	2× Platinum	160,000^{‡}
New Zealand (RMNZ)	Gold	15,000^{‡}
South Africa (RISA)	Gold	20,000^{‡}
United Kingdom (BPI)	Silver	200,000^{‡}
United States (RIAA)	Gold	500,000^{‡}
^{‡} Sales+streaming figures based on certification alone.
