= Ski (Young Stoner Life, Young Thug and Gunna song) =

2021 song by Young Thug and Gunna

Song by Young Stoner Life, Young Thug and Gunna

from the album Slime Language 2
- Released: April 16, 2021
- Genre: Hip hop; trap
- Length: 2:32
- Label: YSL; 300
- Songwriters: Jeffery Lamar Williams; Justin A. Glass; Sergio Kitchens; Tobias Dekker; Wesley Tyler Glass
- Producers: Outtatown; Wheezy; Babywave

Music video
- "Ski" on YouTube

"Ski" is a song by American record label Young Stoner Life and American rappers Young Thug and Gunna. The song was released on April 16, 2021, along the listed artists' compilation album Slime Language 2 (2021). The song was produced by Outtatown, Wheezy, and Babywave .

== Background ==
The song was originally teased in March 2021, with the snippet going viral. "Ski" was then released on April 16, 2021.

== Music video ==
The official music video for the song was released on April 16, 2021, the same day as the track's release. The video was directed by Omar Jones, and produced by Angel J. Rosa and Mark Schroeder. The video features cameos from fellow rappers Swae Lee and NAV, along with NFL player DK Metcalf.

== Reception ==
=== Critical reception ===
Alex Zidel of HotNewHipHop called the track "wavy" and commented that it was "sure to stay in rotation for weeks and months to come". Zidel also described as an "infectious and reminiscent of some of Thug and Wunna's best co-existing records."

=== Dance challenge ===
The track sparked a dance challenge, which was performed by artists such as Chris Brown, Drake, Future, Quavo and more.

== Chart performance ==
"Ski" was the second highest debut on the US Rolling Stone Top 100, entering at number nine with 16.4 million streams. It charted along with eight other tracks from Slime Language 2, including "Solid", which debuted at number three. "Ski" also debuted at number 18 on the US Billboard Hot 100 and number 11 on the US Hot R&B/Hip-Hop Songs charts. In addition, the song also debuted at number 23 on the Billboard's Global 200 chart. On August 4, 2021, the song was certified gold by the Recording Industry Association of America (RIAA) for combined sales and streaming equivalent units of over 500,000 units in the United States.

== Charts ==
=== Weekly charts ===
Weekly chart performance for "Ski"
Chart (2021)	Peak position
Canada Hot 100 (Billboard)	33
Global 200 (Billboard)	23
New Zealand Hot Singles (RMNZ)	6
UK Singles (OCC)	72
US Billboard Hot 100	18
US Hot R&B/Hip-Hop Songs (Billboard)	11
US Rhythmic Airplay (Billboard)	10
US Rolling Stone Top 100	9

=== Year-end charts ===
Year-end chart performance for "Ski"
Chart (2021)	Position
US Hot R&B/Hip-Hop Songs (Billboard)	44

== Certifications ==
Region	Certification	Certified units/sales
United States (RIAA)	Gold	500,000^{‡}
^{‡} Sales+streaming figures based on certification alone.
