= Slime Language 2 =

- Standard edition cover

Compilation album by Young Stoner Life, Young Thug, and Gunna
- Released: April 16, 2021
- Genres: Hip-hop; trap
- Length: 75:02
- Labels: YSL; 300
- Producers: 17OnDaTrack; Alex Lustig; Aloy; Atake; Krazyy CC; BabyWave; Blanco; Bryvn; Bugz Ronin; C-Gutta; Chase Davis; D-Roc; Dez Wright; Dot da Genius; Elyas; Foreign Teck; FwdSlxsh; Gunboi; Har2Nok; Jai Beats; Kayne; London Cyr; Louis-Emile Vromet; Luke Crowder; Neenyo; Nestxv; Nija; Nik D; Nick Papz; Osiris; Outtatown; Oz; Pvlace; Veor Leior; Pyro; RNE LM; Rok; Sean Momberger; Shaan Singh; SK808; Skeyez; Slice; Slime Castro; Sluzyyy; Southside; StarBoy; Taurus; Trappin N London; Turbo; Tyron808; Veor Leior; Wavy-N; Wheezy; YoungProducersMafia; Yung Talent

YSL Records chronology
Slime Language (2018)	Slime Language 2 (2021)	Slime Language 3 (2026)

Young Thug chronology
Slime & B (2020)	Slime Language 2 (2021)	Punk (2021)

Gunna chronology
Wunna (2020)	Slime Language 2 (2021)	DS4Ever (2022)

Singles from Slime Language 2
- 1. "Take It to Trial" Released: December 18, 2020; 2. "GFU" Released: January 29, 2021; 3. "That Go!" Released: February 12, 2021; 4. "Ski" Released: April 26, 2021; 5. "Solid" Released: May 28, 2021

Slime Language 2 is the second compilation album by American record label Young Stoner Life. It was released in conjunction with the label's founder, Young Thug, and one of the label's artists, Gunna. The compilation was released through the label and 300 Entertainment on April 16, 2021. It serves as a sequel to the 2018 release by the label and features outside guest appearances from Travis Scott, Drake, Rowdy Rebel, Lil Baby, Lil Uzi Vert, Coi Leray, Big Sean, Nav, Skepta, Future, YNW Melly, Yung Bleu, Sheck Wes, Kid Cudi, and Meek Mill.

A deluxe edition of the album was released on April 23, 2021. It featured additional outside guest appearances from DaBaby, Don Toliver and Jim Jones.

The compilation was supported by three singles: "Take It to Trial", "That Go!", and "GFU". The album spawned two more singles, "Ski" and "Solid", which debuted at number 18 and 12, respectively, on the US Billboard Hot 100.

== Background and release ==
Gunna revealed the existence of Slime Language 2 in an interview for his second studio album, Wunna, on May 22, 2020, which was released on the same day. Young Thug announced a release date on July 29, 2020, tweeting "#Slimelanguage2 8-16", before later deleting the post. On October 19, 2020, Thug was thought to have confirmed the album's release date of November 27, 2020, for Black Friday and confirmed that late American rapper and singer Juice Wrld would be featured. Instead, the album's lead single, "Take It to Trial", featuring American rapper and YSL Records signee Yak Gotti, was released on Black Friday, but taken down abruptly, and later put back up with a new cover art on December 18, 2020. On November 19, 2020, in an interview on American rapper T.I.'s podcast, Expeditiously, Young Thug revealed that he was working on Slime Language 2 and his upcoming second studio album, Punk, wanting to "start anew" and "start a new relationship with my label". On the same day, he was working with Gunna and Lil Baby in the studio. He officially announced the album's release date on April 12, 2021, also sharing the album's cover art. Artists signed to YSL Records who contribute to the album consist of Young Thug (label boss), Gunna, Yak Gotti, Lil Duke, YTB Trench, Yung Kayo, Thug's brother Unfoonk, Thug's girlfriend Karlae, T-Shyne, Lil Keed, Strick, FN DaDealer, Thug's nephew BSlime and Thug's sisters HiDoraah and Dolly White. The other artists who appear on the album consist of Travis Scott, Drake, Rowdy Rebel, Lil Uzi Vert, Coi Leray, Big Sean, Nav, Skepta, Future, YNW Melly, Yung Bleu, Sheck Wes, Kid Cudi, and Meek Mill. The only artist who is signed to YSL on the deluxe edition of the album is Thug's daughter Mego. The non-YSL-signed artists from the deluxe edition consist of DaBaby, Don Toliver, Jim Jones, and 24Heavy.

== Singles ==
The album's lead single, "Take It to Trial", featuring American rapper and YSL signee Yak Gotti, was released on December 18, 2020. "GFU", performed by Yak Gotti and American rapper Sheck Wes, featuring American rapper and fellow YSL signee Yung Kayo, was released on January 29, 2021, as its second single. On February 12, 2021, "That Go!", performed by Young Thug and American rapper Meek Mill, featuring American rapper and fellow YSL signee T-Shyne, was released as the third and final single.

== Cover artwork ==
The cover art is in the form of a large family portrait, showing the YSL collective sitting in a horror film-inspired living room. Behind the collective, lightning bolts can be seen outside the windows, while a green dog sits in front of everyone, reminiscent of The Mask.

== Critical reception ==
Professional ratings
Review scores
Source	Rating
AllMusic	3/5 stars
Pitchfork	6.7/10

Hypebeast's Sophie Caraan noted of the album: "Despite having a myriad of featured artists in addition to the collective, Slime Language 2 shines a light on both the adaptability and star quality of the YSL Records signees, effectively proving that these artists will stand the tests of time and go down on their own paths to greatness".

Pitchfork's Mehan Jayasuriya wrote how the album has some weak spots, but it proves Young Thug's huge influence on rap today, even when he isn't the main focus. With her quoting, "Ultimately, Slime Language 2 is a label compilation and the usual caveats apply: it’s far too long, the back half is padded out with a few throwaways (“GFU,” “Como Te Llama”) and hardly anyone is showing up with their best material. That said, Slime Language 2 succeeds as a survey of how pervasive Thug's influence has become. Young Thug may not be much of a presence on the album but his sound is all over these songs".

== Commercial performance ==
Slime Language 2 debuted at number one on the US Billboard 200 chart with 113,000 album-equivalent units, including 6,000 pure album sales in its first week. This marks the third number one album for YSL Records, after Young Thug's So Much Fun in 2019 and Gunna's Wunna in 2020.

== Track listing ==
All tracks are credited to Young Stoner Life. Tracks without primary crediting are co-credited to Young Thug and Gunna, excluding tracks 9, 10, 11, 12, 15, 17, 20, 21, and deluxe track 6.

Slime Language 2 standard track listing
No.	Title	Writer(s)	Producer(s)	Length
1.	"Slatty" (featuring Yak Gotti and Lil Duke)	Jeffery Williams; Sergio Kitchens; Deamonte Kendrick; Arnold Martinez; Joshua Luellen	Southside; Gunboi^{[b]}; Pvlace^{[b]}	4:50
2.	"Ski"	J. Williams; Kitchens; Wesley Glass; Tobias Dekker; Justin Glass	Wheezy; Outtatown; BabyWave	2:32
3.	"Diamonds Dancing" (featuring Travis Scott)	J. Williams; Kitchens; Jacques Webster II; Chandler Durham	Turbo	4:02
4.	"Solid" (featuring Drake)	J. Williams; Nick Kobe; Aubrey Graham; Ozan Yıldırım; W. Glass; Michael Hernandez; Elias Sticken	Oz; Wheezy; Foreign Teck^{[a]}; Elyas^{[a]}	3:35
5.	"Came and Saw" (Young Thug featuring Rowdy Rebel)	J. Williams; Chad Marshall; W. Glass	Wheezy; OZ^{[b]}; Nik D^{[b]}	2:54
6.	"Paid the Fine" (featuring Lil Baby and YTB Trench)	J. Williams; Kitchens; Dominique Jones; YTB Trench; W. Glass; Sean Momberger	Wheezy; Momberger	3:21
7.	"Proud of You" (Young Thug featuring Lil Uzi Vert and Yung Kayo)	J. Williams; Symere Woods; Kai Green; Daniel Perez	Bugz Ronin	3:31
8.	"Real" (Young Thug featuring Unfoonk)	J. Williams; Quintavious Grier; Jaidyn Hullum; YoungProducersMafia	Jai Beats; YoungProducersMafia	3:13
9.	"I Like" (featuring Karlae and Coi Leray)	Jerrika Karlae; Brittany Collins; Asia Smith	C-Gutta; SK808^{[a]}; Crowder^{[a]}	3:09
10.	"Warrior" (featuring T-Shyne, Lil Keed, and Big Sean)	Tafa Peters; Raqhid Render; Sean Anderson; Rok Curkovic; Nest	RokOnTheTrack; Nest^{[a]}	3:38
11.	"Pots N Pans" (featuring Lil Duke and Nav)	Martinez; Navraj Goraya; Chase Davis	Davis; Cubeatz^{[b]}	3:13
12.	"WokStar" (featuring Strick and Skepta)	Tauren Strickland; Joseph Adenuga	Sluzyyy; Osiris; ATAKE; Slime Castro; Louis-Emile Vromet	3:01
13.	"Superstar" (Young Thug featuring Future)	J. Williams; Nayvadius Wilburn; W. Glass	Wheezy; Nils^{[b]}	2:29
14.	"Came Out" (Gunna featuring Lil Keed)	Kitchens; Render; W. Glass; Dekker; J. Glass; Anton Mendo	Wheezy; Outtatown; BabyWave; StarBoy	3:11
15.	"Really Be Slime" (featuring YNW Melly, BSlime, and FN DaDealer)	Jamell Demons; Jaborious Martin; Jakobe Moody; Daniel Lebrun; Sven Steenbergen	D-Roc; 17OnDaTrack	3:03
16.	"Take It to Trial" (featuring Yak Gotti)	J. Williams; Kitchens; Kendrick; W. Glass	Wheezy; 2Epik^{[b]}; SMPLGTWY^{[b]}	2:50
17.	"Trance" (featuring Karlae and Yung Bleu)	Karlae; Jeremy Biddle; Trappin N London; Dylan Cleary-Krell	Trappin N London; Dez Wright	3:16
18.	"GFU" (Yak Gotti and Sheck Wes featuring Yung Kayo)	Kendrick; Khadimou Fall; Green; Taurus Currie, Jr.	Taurus	2:45
19.	"Moon Man" (Young Thug featuring Strick and Kid Cudi)	J. Williams; Tauren Strickland; Scott Mescudi; Sean Seaton; Har2Nok; Bryan Yepes	Neenyo; Har2Nok^{[a]}; BRYVN^{[a]}; Dot da Genius^{[b]}	3:20
20.	"Como Te Llama" (featuring HiDoraah)	Dorothea Williams; Skeyez; Shaan Singh	Skeyez; Singh	4:01
21.	"Reckless" (featuring Dolly White)	Dolly Williams; Wavemakers	WaveMakers	1:32
22.	"That Go!" (Young Thug and Meek Mill featuring T-Shyne)	J. Williams; Robert Williams; Peters; Nikolas Papamitrou; Camren Martin	Nick Papz; Yung Talent	3:45
23.	"My City" (remix) (Young Thug featuring YTB Trench)	J. Williams; YTB Trench; RNE LM	RNE LM	3:51
Total length:				75:02

Deluxe bonus tracks
No.	Title	Writer(s)	Producer(s)	Length
1.	"Slam the Door"	J. Williams; Kitchens; W. Glass; Cleary-Krell	Wheezy; Dez Wright	3:08
2.	"Litty" (Young Thug featuring DaBaby)	J. Williams; Jonathan Kirk; Blanco	Blanco; Alex Ghenea^{[b]}	3:36
3.	"No Surprise" (Young Thug featuring Don Toliver and BSlime)	J. Williams; Caleb Toliver; J. Martin; W. Glass; Nija Charles; Alexander Lustig; James Cyr; Adeyinka Bankole-Ojo	Wheezy; Nija; Alex Lustig; London Cyr; Fwdslxsh	3:45
4.	"Mil in Vegas" (Young Thug featuring Nav)	J. Williams; Goraya; W. Glass; Dekker	Wheezy; Outtatown	2:51
5.	"Explosion" (Gunna featuring Yak Gotti and FN DaDealer)	Kitchens; Kendrick; Moody; Durham	Turbo	2:34
6.	"Yessirskii" (featuring Mego)	Mari Williams; James Russell	Slice	1:28
7.	"Mack Truck" (Young Thug featuring Jim Jones)	J. Williams; Joseph Jones II; Veor Leior	Veor Leior	2:05
8.	"Mob Ties" (remix) (Young Thug featuring Unfoonk, 24Heavy, Future, and YTB Trench)	J. Williams; Grier; Ricky Hill; Wilburn; YTB Trench; Renzo de Vries	Aloy; Young T^{[b]}; Josias^{[b]}	3:23
Total length:				98:17

Notes

- ^{^[a]} signifies a co-producer
- ^{^[b]} signifies an uncredited additional producer

== Personnel ==
Credits adapted from Tidal.

=== Musicians ===
- YSL Records – primary artist (all tracks)
- Young Thug – primary artist (tracks 1–8, 13, 16, 19, 22, 23)
- Gunna – primary artist (tracks 1–4, 6, 14, 16)
- Yak Gotti – featured artist (tracks 1, 16, 28), primary artist (track 18)
- Lil Duke – featured artist (tracks 1, 11)
- Travis Scott – featured artist (track 3)
- Drake – featured artist (track 4)
- Rowdy Rebel – featured artist (track 5)
- Lil Baby – featured artist (track 6)
- YTB Trench – featured artist (tracks 6, 23, 31)
- Lil Uzi Vert – featured artist (track 7)
- Yung Kayo – featured artist (tracks 7, 18)
- Unfoonk – featured artist (tracks 8, 31)
- Karlae – featured artist (tracks 9, 17)
- T-Shyne – featured artist (tracks 10, 22)
- Lil Keed – featured artist (tracks 10, 14)
- Big Sean – featured artist (track 10)
- Nav – featured artist (tracks 11, 27)
- Strick – featured artist (tracks 12, 19)
- Future – featured artist (tracks 13, 31)
- YNW Melly – featured artist (track 15)
- BSlime – featured artist (tracks 15, 26)
- FN Da Dealer – featured artist (tracks 15, 28)
- Yung Bleu – featured artist (track 17)
- Sheck Wes – primary artist (track 18)
- Kid Cudi – featured artist (track 19)
- HiDoraah – featured artist (track 20)
- Dolly White – featured artist (track 21)
- Meek Mill – primary artist (track 22)
- DaBaby – featured artist (track 25)
- Don Toliver – featured artist (track 26)
- Mego – featured artist (track 29)
- Jim Jones – featured artist (track 30)
- Chief 100 – featured artist (track 31)

=== Technical ===
- A "Bainz" Bains – mixing, recording (all tracks)
- Aresh Banaji – co-mixing (all tracks)
- Florian "Flo" Ongonga – assistant mixing (all tracks)
- Joe LaPorta – mastering (all tracks)
- Drew Sliger – recording (tracks 10, 19), mixing assistant (tracks 8, 18)
- Bezo – assistant engineer (track 16)
- Alejandro "Aleo" Neira – recording (track 18)
- Shaan Singh – recording (track 18)
- Warpstr – recording (track 18)
- Jonathan Bailey – assistant engineer (track 18)
- Anthony Cruz – recording (track 22)
- Slice – recording (track 22)
- Travis Blake – recording (track 22)

== Charts ==
=== Weekly charts ===
Weekly chart performance for Slime Language 2
Chart (2021)	Peak position
Austrian Albums (Ö3 Austria)	9
Belgian Albums (Ultratop Flanders)	19
Belgian Albums (Ultratop Wallonia)	49
Canadian Albums (Billboard)	2
Danish Albums (Hitlisten)	13
Dutch Albums (Album Top 100)	6
French Albums (SNEP)	40
German Albums (Offizielle Top 100)	31
Italian Albums (FIMI)	45
Lithuanian Albums (AGATA)	10
New Zealand Albums (RMNZ)	14
Norwegian Albums (VG-lista)	4
Swedish Albums (Sverigetopplistan)	58
Swiss Albums (Schweizer Hitparade)	10
US Billboard 200	1
US Top R&B/Hip-Hop Albums (Billboard)	1

=== Year-end charts ===
Year-end chart performance for Slime Language 2
Chart (2021)	Position
US Billboard 200	86
US Top R&B/Hip-Hop Albums (Billboard)	44

== Release history ==
Region	Date	Format	Label	Edition	Ref.
Various	April 16, 2021	Digital download; streaming	YSL; 300	Standard	
Various	April 23, 2021	Digital download; streaming	YSL; 300	Deluxe	
