= Barter 6 =

Mixtape by Young Thug
- Released: April 17, 2015
- Genres: Hip-hop; trap
- Length: 51:52
- Labels: 300; Atlantic
- Producers: Kip Hilson; London on da Track; Ricky Racks; Wheezy

Young Thug chronology
Rich Gang: Tha Tour Pt. 1 (2014)	Barter 6 (2015)	Slime Season (2015)

Singles from Barter 6
- 1. "Check" Released: April 1, 2015

Barter 6 is the debut commercial mixtape by American rapper Young Thug. It was released on April 17, 2015, by 300 Entertainment and Atlantic Records. Barter 6 features guest appearances from Birdman, T.I., Boosie Badazz, Young Dolph, Yak Gotti, Lil Duke and Jacquees, while the production was handled primarily by in-house producers London on da Track and Wheezy, among others. Barter 6 received generally positive reviews and peaked at number 22 on the Billboard 200.

== Title controversy ==
The mixtape was initially titled Carter 6, in continuation of the naming sequence of Lil Wayne's successful Tha Carter album series. This created controversy, as Wayne's scheduled album Tha Carter V was repeatedly delayed amid a dispute between himself and Cash Money Records, who had reportedly refused to release the album. Wayne subsequently became involved in legal proceedings against Cash Money and publicly criticized the label's owner (and Thug's mentor) Birdman, as well as responding negatively to Thug's decision to name the album after him. Despite this, Thug claimed that he was not trying to be disrespectful, and that Wayne was his "idol".

Following a threat of legal action, Thug announced days prior to the release that the project was to be re-titled Barter 6, in line with the typical Blood gang practice of replacing the letter "C" with "B". He furthered the ill feeling by announcing his first show to promote the project in Hollygrove, New Orleans, one of the neighborhoods in which Wayne was raised.

== Marketing and sales ==
Barter 6 was released by 300 Entertainment on April 17, 2015, and charted at number 22 on the US Billboard 200, selling 17,000 copies in its first week. The mixtape's lead single, "Check", was released on April 1, 2015, as well as an accompanying music video, the song peaked at number 100 on the US Billboard Hot 100.

== Critical reception ==
Professional ratings
Aggregate scores
Source	Rating
AnyDecentMusic?	6.5/10
Metacritic	72/100
Review scores
Source	Rating
AllMusic	3.5/5 stars
Billboard	3.5/5 stars
Complex	3.5/5 stars
Consequence	C+
HipHopDX	4.0/5
Now	3/5
Pitchfork	8.4/10
Rolling Stone	3/5 stars
Spin	6/10
XXL	4/5

Barter 6 was met with generally positive reviews. At Metacritic, which assigns a normalized rating out of 100 to reviews from professional publications, the mixtape received an average score of 72, based on 13 reviews. Aggregator AnyDecentMusic? gave it 6.5 out of 10, based on their assessment of the critical consensus.

Complex said "on Barter 6, a rapper frequently dismissed as a druggie dance trapper inverts himself, yielding a passionate and personal record", adding that his "visceral illustrations are one-of-a-kind, and he communicates joy, frustration, and dread with unique clarity". Meaghan Garvey of Pitchfork stated that "Barter 6 feels like a 50-minute performance of what rap, as a form, can do: rap that need not transcend itself, towards High Art on one hand or commercial art on the other, in order to succeed in 2015". Pitchfork later named Barter 6 the 14th best record of 2015 while ranking the mixtape's opening track "Constantly Hating" as the year's sixth best song. HipHopDX called Barter 6 "the definitive mainstream strip club album of the modern era".

In a less enthusiastic review, Spin magazine's Dan Weiss felt Young Thug sounded lazy on Barter 6, "sitting around waiting to ascend to the next level of his sound, for inspiration to strike, though with such a laid-back, inscrutable flow, he might have to activate that change himself". Rolling Stone critic Joe Levy said most of the songs sound "boastful and sad in the same moment", abandoning the frenzied tunefulness of Young Thug's past work in favor of indistinctly "syrupy tracks". Billboard stated that the album "offers cohesion and unity, though maybe at the expense of the exciting, what-will-happen next feel of past mixtapes". Consequence stated that "Barter 6 feels like a step in the right direction rather than a destination, proof that Thugger can put together a complete package even if it's less than adventurous".

== Track listing ==
Barter 6 track listing
No.	Title	Writer(s)	Producer(s)	Length
1.	"Constantly Hating" (featuring Birdman)	Jeffery Williams; Bryan Williams; Wesley Glass	Wheezy	4:27
2.	"With That" (featuring Lil Duke)	J. Williams; Arnold Martinez; London Holmes	London on da Track	3:22
3.	"Can't Tell" (featuring T.I. and Boosie Badazz)	J. Williams; Clifford Harris Jr.; Torrence Hatch; Holmes	London on da Track	6:08
4.	"Check"	J. Williams; Holmes	London on da Track	3:50
5.	"Never Had It" (featuring Young Dolph)	J. Williams; Adolph Thornton Jr.; Glass	Wheezy	4:14
6.	"Dream" (featuring Yak Gotti)	J. Williams; Deamonte Kendrick; Glass	Wheezy	3:01
7.	"Dome" (featuring Lil Duke)	J. Williams; Martinez; Glass	Wheezy	3:51
8.	"Halftime"	J. Williams; Kip Hilson	Hilson	3:46
9.	"Amazing" (featuring Jacquees)	J. Williams; Rodriquez Jacquees Broadnax; Glass; Alta Willis^{[a]}; Albert McKay^{[a]}; Maurice White^{[a]}	Wheezy	3:38
10.	"Knocked Off" (featuring Birdman)	J. Williams; B. Williams; Glass; Ricky Harrell Jr.	Wheezy; Ricky Racks	3:16
11.	"OD"	J. Williams; Glass	Wheezy	4:45
12.	"Numbers"	J. Williams; Holmes	London on da Track	3:27
13.	"Just Might Be"	J. Williams; Glass	Wheezy	3:53
Total length:				51:52

Sample credits

- ^{^[a]} "Amazing" contains a sample of "September", written by Alta Willis, Albert McKay, and Maurice White, as performed by Earth, Wind & Fire.

== Personnel ==
Credits adapted from the mixtape's liner notes and Tidal.

- Young Thug – vocals, executive producer
- Joe LaPorta – mastering engineer
- John Horesco – mastering engineer (4)
- Alex Tumay – mixing engineer (1–3, 5–13)
- Miles Walker – mixing engineer (4)

== Charts ==
=== Weekly charts ===
2015 weekly chart performance for Barter 6
Chart (2015)	Peak position
UK R&B Albums (Official Charts)	24
US Billboard 200	22
US Top R&B/Hip-Hop Albums (Billboard)	5

2025 weekly chart performance for Barter 6
Chart (2025)	Peak position
UK R&B Albums (Official Charts)	10

=== Year-end charts ===
2015 year-end chart performance for Barter 6
Chart (2015)	Position
US Top R&B/Hip-Hop Albums (Billboard)	81

== Certifications ==
Certifications and sales for Barter 6
Region	Certification	Certified units/sales
United States (RIAA)	Gold	500,000^{‡}
^{‡} Sales+streaming figures based on certification alone.
