= Digits (song) =

Song by Young Thug

from the album Slime Season 3
- Released: March 25, 2016
- Genre: Trap; hip-hop
- Length: 2:56
- Label: 300 Entertainment; Atlantic Records
- Songwriters: Jeffery Lamar Williams; London Holmes
- Producer: London on da Track

"Digits" is a song by American rapper Young Thug, released on March 25, 2016, as the third track on his commercial mixtape Slime Season 3. It was produced by longtime collaborator London on da Track.

== Composition and lyrics ==
Musically, "Digits" operates within the modern trap and melodic hip-hop subgenres. London on da Track's production utilizes an ethereal, spacious synth loop paired with rapid-fire hi-hats and deep sub-bass. Lyrically, Young Thug reflects on his newfound wealth, financial success (referencing "digits" in bank accounts), fame, and street loyalty, delivering lines with his signature elastic vocal cadence, oscillating between high-pitched falsettos and aggressive rap flows.

== Critical reception ==
The song was met with critical acclaim. Pitchfork highlighted the track for its seamless fusion of emotional resonance and street-oriented bravado, noting London on da Track's "stunningly spacious production." Rolling Stone and Complex included the song on retrospective lists.

== Commercial performance ==
While "Digits" was not initially pushed as a traditional commercial radio single, its streaming popularity has earned the song a 2x platinum certification by the RIAA.

== In popular culture ==
The song was featured in the 2026 video game Grand Theft Auto VI on the radio station Vice City Rap Radio. The same year, it was featured in the series finale episode of American television series Euphoria, called "In God We Trust".

== Personnel ==
- Young Thug – primary artist, songwriting
- London on da Track – production, songwriting
- Alex Tumay – mixing, engineering
