= That's My Best Friend =

Single by Tokyo Vanity
- Released: June 23, 2015
- Genre: Hip-hop, novelty
- Length: 3:30
- Label: Crowd Ctrl/ Ralph Gatsby; Empire
- Songwriter(s): Sean J McNichol; Babatunde Abiodun Balogun; Kaila Ola Asugha
- Lyricist(s): Tokyo Vanity
- Producer(s): RhondofromJersey

"That's My Best Friend" is a 2015 hip-hop novelty song by rapper and social media personality Tokyo Vanity. After originally posting a funny clip on Vine of her and her "best friend" and fellow Viner, Summerella, it became a viral internet meme.

Tokyo went on to be cast on Love & Hip Hop: Atlanta for Seasons 7, 8 & 9.

== Background ==
At the time, 20-year-old Tokyo Vanity recorded a 15-second clip on Instagram of her saying “That’s my best friend, That’s my best friend!” while Summerella was dancing in the background. Many celebrities from Kendall Jenner to Khloe Kardashian were seeking a best friend to dance with. Tokyo teamed up with producer RhondofromJersey to turn that clip into a full song.

== Actualization of views ==
With the help of director Cinemadonna, Tokyo released her visuals for “That’s My Best Friend.” The video gained more than half a million views in just 30 days.

== Controversy ==
Tokyo Vanity made the claim that Young Thug's song and video for "Best Friend" was stolen from "That's My Best Friend." Vanity claims Thug initially wanted her to be in the video, but she declined. Vanity threatened to sue Thug and his team due to her song being "copywritten [sic] and trademarked."
