= In God We Trust (Euphoria) =

- Euphoria episode
- Rue Bennett as her spirit.
- Episode no.: Season 3 Episode 8
- Directed by: Sam Levinson
- Written by: Sam Levinson
- Editing by: Nikola Boyanov; Aaron I. Butler; Aleshka Ferrero; Julio C. Perez IV
- Original air date: May 31, 2026
- Running time: 93 minutes

Guest appearances
- Nika King as Leslie Bennett; Marshawn Lynch as G; Darrell Britt-Gibson as Bishop; Sam Trammell as Ellis; James Landry Hébert as Harley; Hemky Madera as Jimenez; Kadeem Hardison as Big Eddy; Colman Domingo as Ali Muhammad; Anna Van Patten as Kitty; Asante Blackk as Kidd

Episode chronology
← Previous "Rain or Shine"	Next → —
- Euphoria season 3

"In God We Trust" is the series finale of the American psychological teen drama television series Euphoria. It is the eighth episode of the third season and the twenty-sixth episode overall. Written and directed by series creator Sam Levinson, it originally aired on HBO on May 31, 2026. The episode's title is a reference to the official motto of the United States.

In the episode, Rue Bennett (Zendaya) helps the Drug Enforcement Administration end Laurie's (Martha Kelly) drug trade, but is betrayed by pimp Alamo Brown (Adewale Akinnuoye-Agbaje), who laces fentanyl into Percocet he gives her. She overdoses and dies. Afterward, her mentor Ali Muhammad (Colman Domingo) goes on a revenge quest and kills Alamo.

"In God We Trust" received largely mixed to negative reviews. Out of the seven Primetime Emmy Award nominations received by the show for its third season, four were specifically for this episode, Outstanding Lead Actress in a Drama Series for Zendaya, Outstanding Guest Actor in a Drama Series for Domingo, Outstanding Cinematography for a Series (One Hour) for Marcell Rév, and Outstanding Picture Editing for a Drama Series.

== Plot ==
Rue Bennett (Zendaya) escapes by hitting Wayne (Toby Wallace) on the leg with a wrench and running away. Wayne's father Harley (James Landry Hébert) lassos her, but G (Marshawn Lynch) snipes him and they escape. In a diner, Cassie Jacobs (Sydney Sweeney) tells Maddy Perez (Alexa Demie) they will figure out their future together. At the Silver Slipper, Alamo Brown (Adewale Akinnuoye-Agbaje) is kind to Rue, getting her cut hand stitched up and giving her money and Percocet for the pain.

In Chihuahua, Mitch (Daeg Faerch) and Big Eddy (Kadeem Hardison) load fentanyl onto a Gold Rush Medical Services ambulance. Meanwhile, Rue stays at her mentor Ali Muhammad's (Colman Domingo) house. The ambulance successfully passes Mexico–United States border security. Wayne flees with his girlfriend Faye Valentine (Chloe Cherry) after realizing the trade is a setup. Drug Enforcement Administration vehicles swarm Laurie's (Martha Kelly) property. Harley surrenders and Laurie hangs herself. Detectives remove the ambulance's flooring, but find only a dead rat. Bishop (Darrell Britt-Gibson) drives the real ambulance, swapped out in Mexico, and delivers the fentanyl to Alamo's mansion.

The next morning, Rue hears Fezco O'Neill (Angus Cloud) has escaped from prison on the news. She dashes to save him, having visions of both him and Jules Vaughn (Hunter Schafer) in the process. She returns to her childhood home and finds her mother, Leslie (Nika King), reading the Bible. On the actual morning, Ali wakes to find Rue dead on the couch from an overdose; Alamo had laced her pain medication with fentanyl. Devastated, Ali informs Leslie of her daughter's death. Two months later, at a Narcotics Anonymous meeting, Ali declares that anyone responsible for lethal drugs is evil and says this is his last meeting. Jules mourns Rue by painting her drowning. Cassie brushes off her sister Lexi Howard (Maude Apatow) asking about her husband, whose death has been covered up. Lexi says the Bible has helped her deal with Rue's death.

Ali arrives at the Silver Slipper in his Gulf War uniform with a sawed-off shotgun and locks the doors. Alamo tells Maddy of an epiphany that he wants to have a family with her. Ali interrogates manager G about Rue's death. G lies that he does not know the supplier. Ali shoots G in the penis and threatens the entire club. He shouts for Alamo, who throws a bison head through a glass wall and uses Maddy as a human shield. Alamo offers a duel. Ali agrees to fire when a champagne bottle rolled across a bartop hits the ground, but Alamo tries to shoot early. Bishop has removed the bullets from Alamo's gun, and when the bottle falls, Ali kills Alamo.

A month later, Ali visits the Texas farmstead Rue told him about. He introduces himself as Rue's father with his birth name, Martin McQueen, and tells the family Rue is dead. A child shows Ali the miraculous birth of a calf, which is implied to be Rue's reincarnation. Ali leads the family in prayer, imagining a ghost of Rue, smiling and at peace.

== Production ==
=== Writing ===
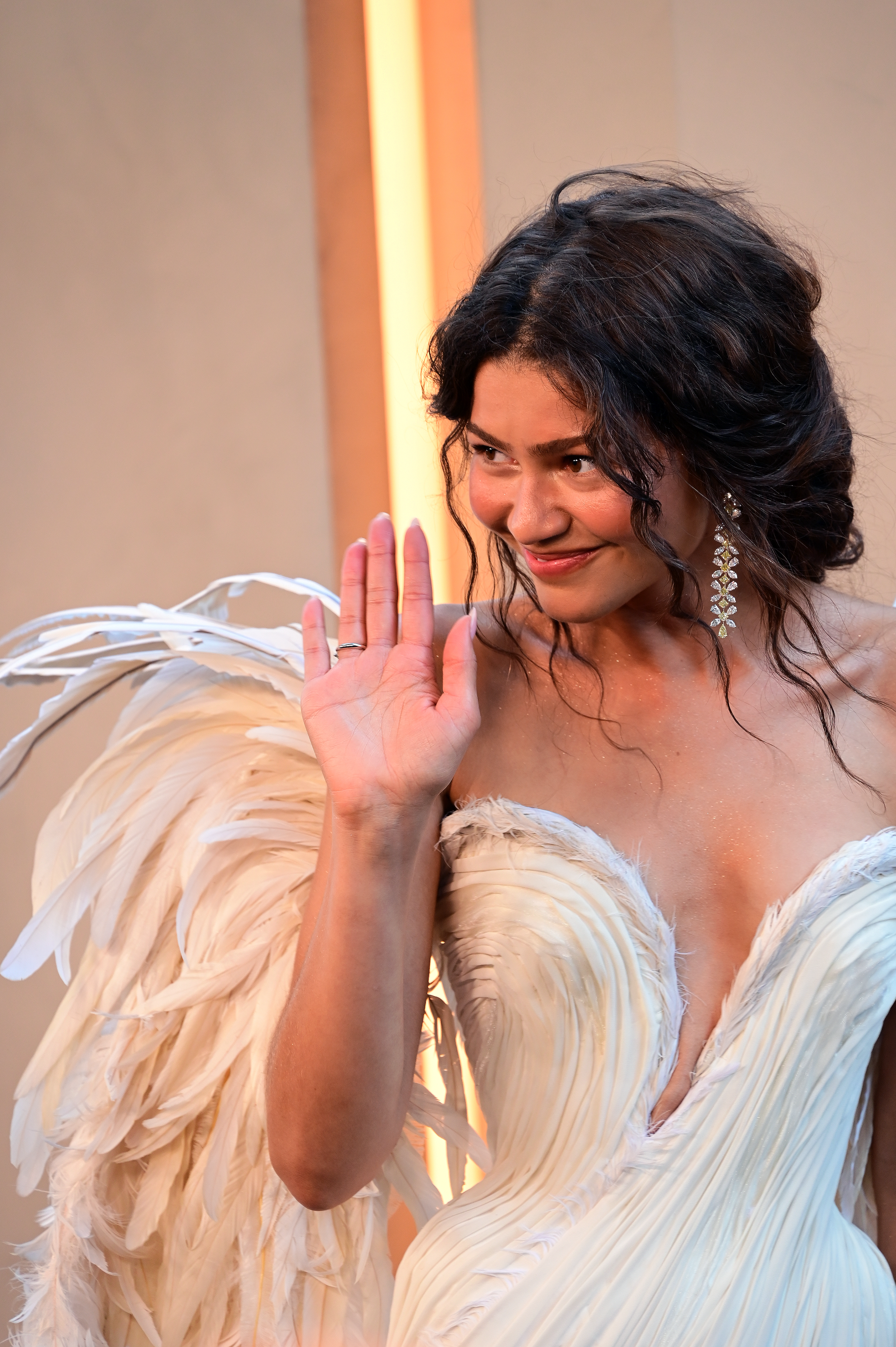
Zendaya was nominated for a Primetime Emmy Award for the episode.

"In God We Trust", the official motto of the United States, is the origin of the episode's title. This name was chosen due to parallel Rue, whose "American Dream" is represented as the Texas homestead she visited in season three's premiere, "Ándale". Rue's last line as a ghost, and the last words spoken in Euphoria, are "May God bless us all". The premiere's title is also referenced when Mitch says it in the episode. Rue's death takes place on October 13, 2024; in the episode she is seen watching news of Starship flight test 5, which took place that day, and it's the date Ali writes in his memorial book.

Series creator Sam Levinson originally wrote a different ending for Rue during the 2023 Writers Guild of America strike. After the sudden death of series regular Angus Cloud, Levinson shifted the focus of the narrative to the ongoing fentanyl crisis, saying: "you can't tell a story about addiction today without the very real consequences. Most people don't get a second chance." To this end, archival test footage of Cloud and Zendaya is used when Rue's life flashes before her eyes. At 93 minutes, the finale is the second-longest television episode ever broadcast on HBO, tied with The Wire's finale, but surpassed by Vinyl's pilot. Despite promoting the episode as a season finale, HBO revealed it was the series finale after the broadcast. In an interview with The New York Times, Levinson elaborated on his decision to end the series, saying: "In terms of the story that we set out to tell, which is a story about addiction and its consequences, this feels like the end to me".

=== Filming ===
Huntington Park, California was used as a filming location for the episode.

Location shooting for the street in Mexico where Rue gets her hand stitched and the strippers get their plastic surgery took place in Huntington Park, California. The scene of Bishop driving Maddy in his Dodge Charger took place on West Olive Avenue in Burbank, California. The gun Ali uses in the episode is a Remington Model 870 with the barrel shortened with a hacksaw. Dominic Fike filmed a scene for the episode, but it was deleted. Director of photography Marcell Rév called Zendaya's last filming day, which involved her driving during her "seven minutes", "very emotional". She also gave a speech to the crew that day: "I just want to say thank you. I'm incredibly grateful for every single one of you, and many of you have been here from the beginning and watched me grow up. It's been a pleasure and an honor. Thank you so much." In an official behind-the-scenes video uploaded to YouTube, Schafer said of Zendaya, "I feel so lucky my first major scene partner ended up being a soulmate. Z is somebody that I'm gonna be talking to when I'm old." Production designer François Audouy explained the creation of Wayne's basement tunnel, which Rue runs through at the start of the episode. Using forced perspective, a 50-foot set was made to look 120 feet long. Audouy said, "it felt like old-school cinema, the in-camera trickery." Zendaya performed her own stunts for the scene where Rue is lassoed by Harley. Domingo said of his scene in the Silver Slipper: "I've barely been in scenes with anybody else, and now, suddenly, I'm in a strip club with a lot of people."

=== Music ===
Johnny Western's "The Ballad of Paladin" plays when Harley surrenders, after appearing in the episode of the same same. Maddy's arrival at the Silver Slipper is set to Don Toliver's "Leave the Club". Other songs that play in the club in the episode include Young Thug's "Digits", Money Man's "Socials", and Flohio's "Booby Traps".

== Reception ==
=== Ratings ===
Before the broadcast, Levinson urged viewers to watch this episode and the last as they aired, to avoid spoilers. According to Nielsen Media Research, "In God We Trust" was watched by 461,000 people as it aired, the highest linear ratings of season 3. It estimates that 0.15% of the US population aged 18–49 was tuning in. Including stats from HBO's streaming service HBO Max, the episode drew 8,700,000 viewers in its first three days of release, a 44% increase from season 2's premiere "Trying to Get to Heaven Before They Close the Door".

=== Critical reviews ===
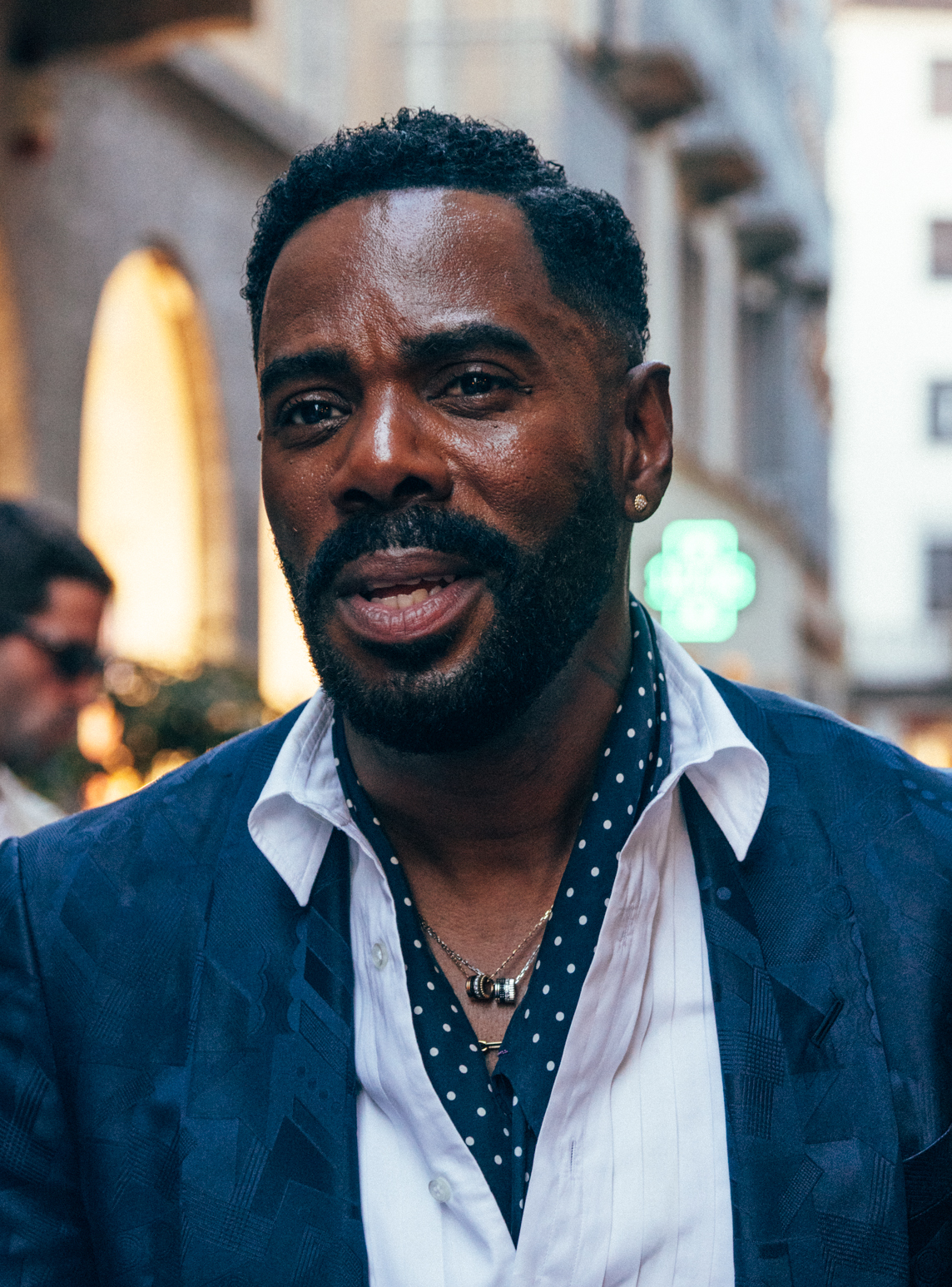
Colman Domingo received a Primetime Emmy Award nomination for his performance.

The episode received mixed to negative reviews. Review aggregator Rotten Tomatoes gives the episode an approval score of 29%, based on 7 critical reviews. TVLine named Domingo their "Performer of the Week" on June 6, 2026 for his work in this episode. The site wrote "Colman Domingo was sensational as Ali fought to avenge Rue's death before finally finding some measure of peace. Ali got to share a quiet moment with Rue before she passed, with Domingo and Zendaya showing us the easy rapport the two had with each other. But in the morning, Ali discovered Rue's lifeless body, and Domingo's face crumpled up in heart-wrenching fashion as Ali was forced to say goodbye to yet another friend." For IndieWire, Ben Travers wrote that the episode "failed spectacularly" to give an "honest" portrayal of how someone like Rue would likely die and called Ali's revenge for her death "overwrought". In Variety, Alison Herman called the finale a "jumbled mishmash that did a lot and said little". The Guardian's Louis Staples called the finale a "lurid epic of biblical proportions", adding that "perhaps Euphoria’s finale wasn’t a lesson on morality at all, but a study in the hypocrisy of this new, algorithm-infused American Dream. It’s just a shame that, like the season as a whole, you have to look so hard – past so many gratuitous gunshots and subplots – to see what the show is trying to say."

In a C+ review for The A.V. Club, Emma Fraser wrote that Rue's early death left a "gaping hole" in the episode and called Schafer's limited appearances a "wasted opportunity". In a three out of five star review for Vulture, Rafaela Bassili wrote that "after seven episodes wearing down the viewer with a bleak perspective, in the season finale, Euphoria pulls itself out of its own somber patterns to reach for grace and mercy in Christian symbolism, American wholesomeness, and the concept of family." Refinery29 wrote that "Thank God Euphoria has come to an end. After watching this very weird and graphic season carelessly shuffle its characters through drug lords, sex work and crime bosses, it finally said something of substance. And though I enjoyed the finale — which creator Sam Levinson recently confirmed wraps the series — I find it difficult to clap too hard." Rolling Stone wrote that the finale "didn’t deliver" what "fans wanted", but "it was the finale the show deserved. Sam Levinson’s era-defining series has come to an end — leaving a messy legacy."

=== Accolades ===
The episode was Zendaya's submission at the 78th Primetime Emmy Awards, leading her to be nominated for the Primetime Emmy Award for Outstanding Lead Actress in a Drama Series. Three of Euphoria's nominations at the 78th Primetime Creative Arts Emmy Awards were for the episode. Domingo was nominated for the Primetime Emmy Award for Outstanding Guest Actor in a Drama Series. Rév was nominated for the Primetime Emmy Award for Outstanding Cinematography for a Series (One Hour). Editors Nikola Boyanov, Aleshka Ferrero, Aaron I. Butler, Julio C. Perez IV and additional editor Kristin Valentine were nominated for the Primetime Emmy Award for Outstanding Picture Editing for a Drama Series.
