= Check (Young Thug song) =

Single by Young Thug

Single by Young Thug

from the album Barter 6
- Released: April 1, 2015
- Recorded: 2015
- Genre: Hip hop; trap
- Length: 3:50
- Label: 300; Atlantic
- Songwriters: Jeffrey Williams; London Holmes
- Producer: London on da Track

Young Thug singles chronology
"Throw Sum Mo" (2014)	"Check" (2015)	"I Know There's Gonna Be (Good Times)" (2015)

"Check" is a song by American rapper Young Thug. It was released as the lead single from his breakout commercial mixtape Barter 6 on April 1, 2015.

== Release ==
"Check" was released on April 1, 2015, with the music video. The song was later released on iTunes as a part of Barter 6. The song was located at track number 4 of the album.

== Music video ==
The video for "Check" was released on the content aggregating video blog website of WorldStarHipHop and the website's official YouTube channel on April 1, 2015. It includes cameos by American rapper Birdman and other Cash Money Records crew members. The music video was directed by Be El Be.

== Chart performance ==
"Check" debuted and peaked at number 100 on the US Billboard Hot 100 for the chart dated July 11, 2015.

== Charts ==
=== Weekly charts ===
Chart (2015)	Peak position
US Billboard Hot 100	100
US Hot R&B/Hip-Hop Songs (Billboard)	30

== Certifications ==
Region	Certification	Certified units/sales
Canada (Music Canada)	Gold	40,000^{‡}
United Kingdom (BPI)	Silver	200,000^{‡}
United States (RIAA)	Platinum	1,000,000^{‡}
^{‡} Sales+streaming figures based on certification alone.
