= Slimed In =

Slimed In may refer to:

- "Slimed In", a song by Young Thug from the 2018 album Slime Language
- "Slimed In", a song by Future from the 2024 album We Don't Trust You
