= Slime Season =

Mixtape by Young Thug
- Released: September 16, 2015
- Recorded: 2014–15
- Genres: Hip hop; trap; experimental hip hop
- Length: 70:06
- Label: Self-released
- Producers: London on da Track; Goose; Sonny Digital; Southside; Metro Boomin; Allen Ritter; Ricky Racks; Yung Shad; KIP Hilson; Eestbound; Isaac Flame; Wheezy; WondaGurl

Reissue cover art

Young Thug chronology
Barter 6 (2015)	Slime Season (2015)	Slime Season 2 (2015)

Singles from Slime Season
- 1. "Best Friend" Released: September 14, 2015

Slime Season is the seventh self-released mixtape by American rapper Young Thug, released on September 16, 2015. It features production from a range of artists, including London on da Track, Metro Boomin, Ricky Racks, Wheezy, and WondaGurl, and guest appearances from Migos, Gucci Mane, Peewee Longway, and Lil Wayne.

The mixtape was largely compiled from tracks that had leaked on the internet in the previous year. Upon release, the mixtape received positive reviews from critics, while the single "Best Friend" charted. As well as “Best Friend”, Slime Season also included the song “Power”, which has amassed over 150 million views on YouTube as of 2020. It was followed later in the year by Slime Season 2. On December 25, 2024, the mixtape was released through YSL Records and 300 Entertainment on streaming media.

== Background ==
Slime Season was compiled from archival material in an attempt to circumvent a series of 2015 data leaks which saw hundreds of unreleased Young Thug tracks uploaded to the internet. The material may date back at least one year. The mixtape received a sequel, Slime Season 2, which was released the following month. Slime Season 3 was released in 2016. The title pays homage to Ola Playa, a rapper from Young Thug's YSL label record who released his own Slime Season mixtape in March 2014.

== Critical reception ==
Professional ratings
Aggregate scores
Source	Rating
AnyDecentMusic?	7.4/10
Metacritic	80/100
Review scores
Source	Rating
Consequence of Sound	B
Crack Magazine	8/10
Pitchfork	7.6/10
Spin	8/10

Slime Season received critical acclaim from critics, with an aggregate score of 80 out of 100 on Metacritic. Under the Gun called it "an abstract masterwork" and "2015's hip-hop answer to jamming sonic psychedelia. Spin stated that "this is simply rap’s foremost stylist mouthing off ferociously on all cylinders." HotNewHipHop called it "just the game-changer we expected it to be, showcasing an even more confident and experimental Thugger than we heard on Barter 6." Pitchfork called the mixtape "an odds-and-ends compilation with no coherent vision," but wrote that "Thug remains one of hip-hop's most exciting stylists" and pointed out the tracks "Freaky," "Draw Down," and "Wood Would" as highlights.

== Track listing ==
No.	Title	Producer(s)	Length
1.	"Take Kare" (Rich Gang featuring Young Thug and Lil Wayne)	London on da Track	4:26
2.	"Quarterback" (featuring Migos and Peewee Longway)	Sonny Digital	5:01
3.	"Rarri" (featuring Young Ralph)	Southside	3:16
4.	"Stunna"	Isaac Flame	4:08
5.	"Best Friend"	Ricky Racks; Young Shad	3:32
6.	"Power"	London on da Track	3:14
7.	"Calling Your Name"	Goose	5:03
8.	"No Way"	London on da Track	4:33
9.	"Mine"	Allen Ritter	2:41
10.	"Freaky"	WondaGurl; Eestbound	5:33
11.	"Be Me See Me"	Metro Boomin	3:36
12.	"Overdosin'"	Ricky Racks	3:01
13.	"Again" (featuring Gucci Mane)	London on da Track	2:56
14.	"That's All"	Goose	4:01
15.	"UDiggWhatImSayin'"	KIP Hilson	3:07
16.	"Draw Down"	London on da Track	4:21
17.	"Wood Would"	Wheezy	3:30
18.	"Wanna Be Me (Bonus Track)"	London on da Track	4:07
Total length:			70:06

== Charts ==
Weekly chart performance for Slime Season
Chart (2025)	Peak position
Hungarian Physical Albums (MAHASZ)	31
