= Wheezy (disambiguation) =

Wheezy (born 1992) is an American record producer.

Wheezy may also refer to:

- Wheezy, character from the 1999 film Toy Story 2
- Wheezy, the codename of version 7 of the Debian Linux operating system

== See also ==
- Weezy, a nickname of American rapper Lil Wayne
- Weezie, a nickname of All in the Family character Louise Jefferson
