= Lil Duke =

American rapper (1985)

- Born: Arnold Martinez; March 29, 1988 (age 38)
- Genres: Southern hip hop; trap; mumble rap; progressive rap
- Occupations: Rapper; singer; songwriter
- Years active: 2012-present
- Labels: YSL Records; 300 Entertainment

Arnold Martinez (born March 29, 1985), known professionally as Lil Duke, is an American rapper and singer from Atlanta, Georgia. Duke is a member of Young Thug's "Young Stoner Life Records". He started out as Yung Duke in the late 2000's before joining PeeWee Longway's music group label MPA BandCamp. In 2015 after MPA disbanded, after that he stuck with YSL as Lil Duke, which is the moniker under which he has released all of his music. However he is often credited on his features simply as Duke, his official stage name goes back and forth.

Duke has made appearances on songs for artists such as Trippie Redd, Chris Brown, Machine Gun Kelly, and NAV along with the projects of his label mates such as Lil Keed and Gunna. Duke is most known for the verses he’s contributed to on Young Thug’s projects including Barter 6, I’m Up, Slime Season 3, Slime Language, and most notably So Much Fun.

Duke has released 19 singles, 10 mixtapes, and one studio album.

== Career ==
On August 16, 2015, Martinez released a self titled mixtape "Lil Duke" in which Young Thug, PeeWee Longway, Travis Scott, Offset and others appeared. Notable song, "On My Vibe", featuring Travis Scott was leaked earlier in the summer and Martinez managed to officially claim it.

On April 14, 2016, Martinez was announced to be in a group member of Bankroll Mafia for their debut album releasing on April 22.

On April 22, 2016, Martinez was part of Atlanta-based hip-hop supergroup, Bankroll Mafia and released their debut studio album which was self titled "Bankroll Mafia". The group was composed of Lil Duke himself, TI, Young Thug, PeeWee Roscoe, Shad Da God, and London Jae. The group was short lived and didn't release another album.

On May 1, 2016, Martinez released a solo mixtape called "Uber", the mixtape features artists including Young Thug, Lil Yachty, Lil Durk, 21 Savage and Anthony Hamilton.

On November 16, 2016, Martinez became the first member to be part of Young Thugs YSL Records. Young Thug signed a label deal with 300 Entertainment for his own YSL Records imprint. Young Thug made a promise with Duke to sign him to the record label.

On April 20, 2017, Martinez released his debut project, "Life in the Hills", under YSL Records. The mixtape features collaborations with artists such as Gunna, Young Thug, Don Q, Dave East, and Wiz Khalifa.

On June 5, 2017, Martinez joined Young Thug, Quavo, and Rich The Kid on the single "WTF You Doin"

On July 23, 2021, Martinez released his debut studio album, "Duke Hefner", the 20-track project features collaborations with Young Thug, Gunna, Davido, Lil Keed, Unfoonk, Yak Gotti, and Stunna4Vegas.

== Musical style ==
Lil Duke's musical style is characterized by a blend of melodic rap and trap influences, reflecting his Atlanta roots. Duke's work often features atmospheric beats layered with heavy 808s, complementing his dynamic vocal delivery. AllMusic said, Lil Duke is known for his laid-back trap style. his discography includes projects like Blue Devil 2 and Duke Hefner, which showcase his melodic rap and trap influences.

== Discography ==
=== Studio albums ===
List of albums, with selected chart positions
Title	Details
Duke Hefner	Released: July 23, 2021; Label: YSL, 300; Formats: CD, LP, digital download, streaming

=== Collaborative albums ===
List of albums, with selected chart positions
Title	Album details
Bankroll Mafia (with T.I., Young Thug, PeeWee Roscoe, Shad Da God, and London Jae.)	Released: April 22, 2016; Label: Bankroll Mafia LLC., Grand Hustle Records, Empire Distribution; Format: CD, digital download
"—" denotes a title that did not chart, or was not released in that territory.

=== Compilation albums ===
List of albums, with selected chart positions
Title	Album details	Peak chart positions						
Title	Album details	US	BEL (FL)	CAN	FRA	NLD	NZ	UK
Slime Language (with Young Thug and YSL Records)	Released: August 17, 2018; Label: YSL, 300; Format: CD, LP, digital download, streaming	8	111	11	—	46	—	88
Slime Language 2 (with Young Stoner Life, Young Thug and Gunna)	Released: April 16, 2021; Label: YSL, 300; Format: CD, LP, digital download, streaming	1	19	2	40	6	14	—
"—" denotes a title that did not chart, or was not released in that territory.								

=== Mixtapes ===
List of mixtapes, with selected chart positions
Title	Details
Lil Duke	Released: August 16, 2015; Label: YSL; Formats: CD, LP, digital download, streaming
Uber	Released: May 1, 2016; Label: YSL; Formats: CD, LP, digital download, streaming
Blue Devil	Released: June 3, 2016; Label: YSL; Formats: CD, LP, digital download, streaming
Life in the Hills	Released: April 20, 2017; Label: YSL; Formats: CD, LP, digital download, streaming
Uberman 2	Released: November 28, 2017; Label: YSL, Hoodrich Entertainment; Formats: CD, LP, digital download, streaming
Reality Checc	Released: April 10, 2018; Label: YSL; Hoodrich Entertainment; Formats: CD, LP, digital download, streaming
Blue Devil 2	Released: July 12, 2019; Label: YSL, 300; Formats: CD, LP, digital download, streaming

=== Charted singles ===
==== As featured artist ====
Title	Year	Peak chart positions				Certifications	Album
Title	Year	US	US R&B/HH	CAN	NZ Hot	Certifications	Album
"Mac 10" (Trippie Redd featuring Lil Baby and Lil Duke)	2019	64	24	93	30	RIAA: Platinum	!
"Bullets with Names" (Machine Gun Kelly featuring Young Thug, RJmrLA and Lil Duke)	2020	—	—	—	35		Hotel Diablo: Floor 13 Edition

=== Other charted and certified songs ===
Title	Year	Peak chart positions			Certifications	Album
Title	Year	US	US R&B/HH	WW	Certifications	Album
"With That" (Young Thug featuring Lil Duke)	2014	—	—	—	RIAA: Platinum	Barter 6
"Slatty" (Young Stoner Life, Young Thug and Gunna featuring Yak Gotti and Lil Duke)	2021	99	39	154		Slime Language 2
