= Best Friend (Young Thug song) =

Single by Young Thug

from the album Slime Season
- Released: November 20, 2015
- Recorded: 2015
- Genre: Hip hop; trap
- Length: 3:33
- Label: 300; Atlantic
- Songwriter(s): Jeffery Williams; N. Cobey; Ricky Harrell Jr.; Rashad Deonte Simmons
- Producer(s): Ricky Racks; Yung Shad

Young Thug singles chronology
| "Rihanna" (2015) | "Best Friend" (2015) | "Minnesota" (2016) |

Music video
- "Best Friend" on YouTube

"Best Friend" is a song by American rapper Young Thug, released on November 20, 2015 as a single from his mixtape, Slime Season. The song was produced by Ricky Racks and Yung Shad.

== Commercial performance ==
"Best Friend" debuted at number 98 on Billboard Hot 100 for the chart dated December 12, 2015. The song peaked at number 45 on the chart, making it at the time Young Thug's most successful single as a lead artist at the time. The song was certified Platinum by the Recording Industry Association of America (RIAA).

== Music video ==
The song's accompanying music video premiered on September 14, 2015 on Young Thug's YouTube account. It was directed by Be El Be & Young Thug himself. Since its release, the video has received over 200 million views on YouTube.

== Controversy ==
The song has garnered slight controversy due to Young Thug's song and video for "Best Friend". As far as the song, rapper, Tokyo Vanity believes Thug stole the track from her song "That's My Best Friend." Vanity claims Thug initially wanted her to be in the video, but she declined. Vanity threatened to sue Thug and his team due to her song being "copy written [sic] and trademarked."

Additionally, the video received attention for its bizarre visuals where Thug plays multiple characters and gets served his own head at dinner.

== Charts ==
=== Weekly charts ===
| Chart (2016) | Peak position |
|---|---|
| US Billboard Hot 100 | 45 |
| US Hot R&B/Hip-Hop Songs (Billboard) | 9 |

=== Year-end charts ===
| Chart (2016) | Position |
|---|---|
| US Hot R&B/Hip-Hop Songs (Billboard) | 46 |

== Certifications ==
| Region | Certification | Certified units/sales |
|---|---|---|
| United States (RIAA) | Platinum | 1,000,000^{‡} |
^{‡} Sales+streaming figures based on certification alone.
