= Slime Language =

Compilation album by Young Thug and YSL Records

Compilation album by Young Thug and YSL Records
- Released: August 17, 2018
- Studios: Tree Sound, Atlanta; Crosby, Los Angeles; Record Plant, Los Angeles, CA; Billboard, Atlanta
- Genres: Hip-hop; trap
- Length: 50:43
- Labels: YSL; 300
- Producers: Wheezy (exec.); London on da Track (also exec.); Billboard Hitmakers; Bobby Raps; Charlie Handsome; Cicero; DY; K Bangerz; Kacey Khaliel; Keyyz; Mattazik; Psymun; Smoke; SinGrinch; Super; Turbo; Woodpecker

YSL Records chronology
Slime Language (2018)	Slime Language 2 (2021)

Young Thug chronology
Hear No Evil (2018)	Slime Language (2018)	On the Rvn (2018)

Slime Language is the debut collaborative compilation album by American record label YSL Records and American rapper Young Thug, who is the leader of the label. It was released on August 17, 2018, for streaming and digital download by YSL Records and 300 Entertainment. The compilation features guest appearances from YSL artists Lil Duke, Gunna, Strick, Thug's sisters Dolly and HiDoraah, Thug's fiancé (Jerrika) Karlae, as well as Lil Uzi Vert, Lil Keed, Nechie, Lil Baby, Jacquees, Tracy T and others. The album is executive produced by Wheezy and London on da Track and features production from Keyyz, K Bangerz, Kacey Khaliel, DY, Charlie Handsome, Smoke, Mattazik, Super, Billboard Hitmakers and Turbo, among others. The album's sequel, Slime Language 2, was released on April 16, 2021, with the deluxe edition of the album being released exactly a week later on April 23, 2021.

== Background ==
On August 1, 2018, the album was announced by Young Thug, when he sent several music publications pet snakes and a booklet containing names of artists including Lil Uzi Vert, Gunna and Jacquees. Thug initially set the release date for his 27th birthday, August 16, but later clarified that it would be released later in the evening on August 16. A representative for Thug explained that the album was a "compilation project [and] not a Young Thug album, EP or mixtape."

== Critical reception ==
Professional ratings
Aggregate scores
Source	Rating
Metacritic	68/100
Review scores
Source	Rating
AllMusic	3/5 stars
Exclaim!	7/10
Highsnobiety	3.0/5
HipHopDX	3.0/5
HotNewHipHop	86%
Pitchfork	7.3/10
XXL	3/5

At Metacritic, which assigns a normalized rating out of 100 to reviews from mainstream publications, the album received an average score of 68, based on 6 reviews, indicating "generally favourable reviews". Charles Holmes of XXL concluded: "Endearing, ambitious and a tad overstuffed, Slime Language is a literal and figurative family reunion. However, like any Black family reunion, the project captivates when the young are allowed to flex in front of the father and claw their way from the periphery to the main stage." Riley Wallace from Exclaim! applauded the album, saying, "Thug is a rock star who knows his audience, and Slime Language shows his ear for talent on full display", adding that the album "walks the fine line of consistency and monotony, delivering a stream of well-crafted bangers sprinkled with Thugga's unmistakable aura as the binding glue." HotNewHipHop believed that "Thug sounds like he's having the most fun he's had since his Rich Gang days." Despite being a compilation, Evan Rytlewski of Pitchfork believed Slime Language "is so generous with its star attraction that the distinction barely matters, and Thug digs in with his usual rubber-jawed zeal", also stating that the project is Young Thug's "most cheerful, undemanding project since the I Came from Nothing mixtapes of his less adventurous early years, before stylistic gambits took hold over simple pleasures."

Online hip-hop publication HipHopDX stated that Slime Language "suffers from being predictable, which is the last thing you’d ever want or expect from a Young Thug-affiliated project. The lesser-known artists don't make much of a mark, the more notorious features are the clear highlights, and the project, as a whole, offers nothing to compete with the highs of Beautiful Thugger Girls — let alone the hallucinatory string of releases from 2015." Thomas Hobbs of Highsnobiety believed the album was underwhelming as a compilation project, though fared well as a solo project: "If you need reminding of why Young Thug is one of modern rap’s most original stars, Slime Language provides plenty of evidence. However, as a showcase for Young Stoner Life Records, it feels like it’s lacking. Young Thug clearly has aspirations to follow his inspiration Lil Wayne and help launch the careers of future superstars, but this record doesn’t feel like the moment he will achieve this dream. Put simply; Slime Language is a good Young Thug album, but an average compilation project. Don’t be surprised if you find yourself fast-forwarding straight to the Thugger verses."

== Commercial performance ==
Slime Language debuted at number eight on the US Billboard 200 with 41,000 album-equivalent units, with streaming units accounting for 38,000 of the total.

== Track listing ==
Credits adapted from Geoffrey Ogunlesi's Instagram and in part from BMI and ASCAP.

No.	Title	Writer(s)	Producer(s)	Length
1.	"Tsunami"	Jeffery Williams; Wesley Glass; Kenneth Gilmore	Wheezy; Keyyz; Pvlace	3:07
2.	"U Ain't Slime Enough" (featuring Karlae and Lil Duke)	Williams; Jerrika Karlae; Arnold Martinez; Levi de Jong	Woodpecker	4:14
3.	"Gain Clout"	Williams; Gilmore; Dyamond Hudson	Keyyz; Smoke	2:05
4.	"Oh Yeah" (featuring HiDoraah)	Williams; Dorothea Williams; Gilmore	K Bangerz; Keyyz	3:33
5.	"Audemar" (featuring Tracy T)	Williams; Tracy Richardson; Gilmore	Keyyz	3:27
6.	"Chanel (Go Get It)" (featuring Gunna and Lil Baby)	Williams; Sergio Kitchens; Dominique Jones; Glass; Corey French; Simon Christensen	Wheezy; SinGrinch; Psymun	3:21
7.	"Dirty Shoes" (featuring Gunna)	Williams; Kitchens; Ryan Vojtesak; Leon Thomas III	Wheezy; Charlie Handsome	3:18
8.	"It's a Slime" (featuring Lil Uzi Vert)	Williams; Symere Woods; Glass	Wheezy	2:22
9.	"Scoliosis" (featuring Gunna and Lil Duke)	Williams; Kitchens; Martinez; Gilmore	Keyyz; Mattazik; Smoke; Vybe Beatz	3:40
10.	"Goin Up" (featuring Lil Keed)	Williams; Raqhid Render; Askia Fountain; Zairyus Jackson	Kacey Khaliel	3:34
11.	"January 1st" (featuring Jacquees and Trapboy Freddy)	Williams; Rodriquez Broadnax; Devarius Moore; Glass; Dwan Avery; Rahsan Kyles	Wheezy; DY; Cicero; Bobby Raps	4:18
12.	"Chains Choking Me" (featuring Gunna)	Williams; Kitchens; Glass; Vojtesak	Wheezy; Charlie Handsome; Bobby Raps	3:01
13.	"STS" (featuring Strick)	Williams; Tauren Strickland; Eric Williams; Donell Jones; Jeremy Duckworth	Super	3:39
14.	"Expensive" (featuring HiDoraah and Dolly)	Williams; D. Williams; Dolly Williams	Billboard Hitmakers	2:56
15.	"Slimed In" (featuring Nechie)	Williams; Ceron Lee; Chandler Durham	Turbo	4:08
Total length:				50:43

== Personnel ==
Credits adapted from Geoffrey Ogunlesi's Instagram.

- Bainz – recording (tracks 1–3, 5, 8, 10, 11, 13)
- Chef – recording (track 4)
- Alex Tumay – recording (track 5), mixing (all tracks)
- Shaan Singh – recording (track 6)
- Jenso Plymouth – recording (track 13)
- Turn Me Up Josh – recording (track 15), additional mixing (track 15)
- Joe LaPorta – mastering (all tracks)

== Charts ==
Chart (2018)	Peak position
Belgian Albums (Ultratop Flanders)	111
Belgian Albums (Ultratop Wallonia)	194
Canadian Albums (Billboard)	11
Dutch Albums (Album Top 100)	46
UK Albums (Official Charts)	88
US Billboard 200	8
