= I'm Up (Young Thug mixtape) =

Mixtape by Young Thug
- Released: February 5, 2016
- Recorded: 2015–16
- Genre: Hip hop
- Length: 38:03
- Labels: 300; Atlantic
- Producers: Fuse; Mike Will Made It; Metro Boomin; Resource; Tre Pounds; Wheezy; London on da Track

Young Thug chronology
Slime Season 2 (2015)	I'm Up (2016)	Slime Season 3 (2016)

Singles from I'm Up
- 1. "Fuck Cancer (Boosie)" Released: January 26, 2016; 2. "For My People" Released: February 4, 2016

Professional ratings
Aggregate scores
Source	Rating
AnyDecentMusic?	7.1/10
Metacritic	76/100
Review scores
Source	Rating
AllMusic	3.5/5 stars
Consequence of Sound	B−
Exclaim!	6/10
HipHopDX	3.5/5
NME	4/5
Pitchfork	7.6/10
PopMatters	8/10
Spin	7/10
Tiny Mix Tapes	3.5/5
XXL	3/5

I'm Up is a mixtape by American rapper Young Thug. It was released on February 5, 2016, by 300 Entertainment and Atlantic Records. The mixtape features guest appearances from Trouble, Ralo, Lil Durk, Lil Duke, Solo Lucci, Young Butta, Quavo, Offset, Dora and Dolly (Young Thug's sisters).

== Commercial performance ==
I'm Up debuted at number 22 on the Billboard 200, with first week sales of 21,000 copies. It was the seventeenth highest-selling album of that week domestically.

== Track listing ==
No.	Title	Writer(s)	Producer(s)	Length
1.	"F Cancer (Boosie)" (featuring Quavo)	Jeffery Williams; Michael Williams II; Quavious Marshall; Braylin Bowman	Mike Will Made It; Resource	4:09
2.	"My Boys" (featuring Trouble, Ralo and Lil Durk)	Williams; Wesley Glass; Mariel Orr; Terrell Davis; Durk Banks	Wheezy	5:04
3.	"For My People" (featuring Lil Duke)	Williams; Glass; Arnold Martinez	Wheezy	4:00
4.	"King Troup"	Williams; Glass	Wheezy	3:45
5.	"Ridin" (featuring Lil Durk)	Williams; Glass; Banks	Wheezy	4:08
6.	"Hercules"	Williams; Leland Wayne	Metro Boomin	4:40
7.	"Special" (featuring Offset and Solo Lucci)	J. Williams; Williams II; Bowman; Michael Dorsey; Kiari Cephus	Mike Will Made It; Resource	4:23
8.	"Bread Winners" (featuring Young Butta)	Williams; Eduardo Earle, Jr.; Jeffrey LaCroix	Fuse; Tre Pounds	3:46
9.	"Family" (featuring HiDoraah and Dolly White)	Williams; Glass	London on da Track	4:03
Total length:				38:03

Notes

- "Family" features an outro by Trouble

== Charts ==
Chart (2016)	Peak position
Canadian Albums (Billboard)	98
US Billboard 200	22
US Top R&B/Hip-Hop Albums (Billboard)	6
