= Ricky Racks =

American record producer and songwriter from Georgia

- Born: Ricky Harrell, Jr. March 7, 1986 (age 40); Greenville, North Carolina, U.S.
- Origin: Atlanta, Georgia, U.S.
- Genres: Hip hop; trap; R&B
- Occupations: Record producer; songwriter
- Instruments: FL Studio; keyboard
- Years active: 2011–present

Ricky Harrell, Jr. (born March 7, 1986), professionally known as Ricky Racks, is an American record producer and songwriter. He is best known for production with well-known artists, most notably Young Thug, Young Scooter, Migos, and Lil Yachty.

== Early life ==
Ricky Harrell, Jr. was born on March 7, 1986, in Greenville, North Carolina. As his father played guitar in a band called One-A-Chord, Racks' was introduced to music at a young age. While he learned the drums, he never considered being a musician, instead preferring sports such as basketball. Racks grew up listening to gospel, 90s RnB and rock, but discovered New York hip-hop himself as a teenager, listening to artists such as 50 Cent and Jay-Z. As Racks learned more about southern culture, he found himself gravitating to the more southern rap style of Yo Gotti and Gorilla Zoe. He began producing music between the ages of 16 and 17, but gave it up after four years without major success.

== Career ==
Racks got back into music production when his friend gave him a computer. Racks had previously said to him that there was no money in music, but the friend liked Racks' demo CD of rap beats, and thought that Racks had potential. Stafa, another of Racks' friends and a sound engineer, had moved to Atlanta, the home of modern southern rap. In Atlanta, Stafa met DJ Holiday who asked for some demo beats for Rick Ross. After sending some of Racks' demos to DJ Holiday, Holiday was very interested in Racks, and offered to sign him. Racks moved to Atlanta on May 6, 2012. Racks connected with Atlanta rap group Migos through their uncle, who was a friend of Racks from Greenville. Racks' relationship with Migos would lead to production credits on their Culture and Culture II albums. He combines influences from east coast and southern hip hop.

Song	Album	Artist	Year
Best Friend	Best Friend	Young Thug	2015
What The Price	Culture	Migos	2016
Racks In My Pocket	Racks In My Pocket	21 Savage	2016
Slime Shit	Slime Season 3	Young Thug	2016
Peek A Boo	Teenage Emotions	Lil Yachty	2017
Mediterranean	Quality Control: Control The Streets, Volume 1	Quality Control	2017
Ice Tray	Quality Control: Control The Streets, Volume 1	Quality Control	2017
On Too Me	On Too Me	Gunna	2018
Coupe	Coupe - Single	Lil Baby & Offset	2018
Farewell	Music to Be Murdered By	Eminem	2020
