= Slime Season 3 =

Mixtape by Young Thug
- Released: March 25, 2016
- Recorded: 2015
- Genre: Hip-hop
- Length: 28:20
- Labels: 300; Atlantic
- Producers: Allen Ritter; Isaac Flame; London on da Track; MariiBeatz; Mike Will Made It; Ricky Racks

Young Thug chronology
I'm Up (2016)	Slime Season 3 (2016)	Jeffery (2016)

Singles from Slime Season 3
- 1. "Worth It" Released: February 15, 2016

Slime Season 3 (stylized as SLIME S3ASON) is the third commercial mixtape by American rapper Young Thug. It was released on March 25, 2016, by 300 Entertainment and Atlantic Records. The mixtape serves as the third installment to the Slime Season series. It consists of eight tracks, which feature guest appearances from Yak Gotti, Lil Duke and Peewee Roscoe. Production was handled by Mike Will Made It, London on da Track, Allen Ritter, Isaac Flame and MariiBeatz, among others.

Slime Season 3 received generally positive reviews from critics and debuted at number seven on the US Billboard 200.

== Background ==
Young Thug announced the release date of Slime Season 3 through a funeral procession at SXSW in Austin, Texas. The coffin was covered in red graffiti scribblings that revealed the album's title and the release date. Written on the casket was "3.25.16" and "Slime Season". Lyor Cohen teased the funeral on Snapchat, saying, "Today in Austin, we're gonna bury Slime Season 3". Be El Be expanded on Twitter saying. "What Lyor meant was, dropping SS3 and getting past all the talk and this era of thug", he posted. "Moving forward to dropping albums and hits SS3 OTW".

== Critical reception ==
Professional ratings
Aggregate scores
Source	Rating
AnyDecentMusic?	7.2/10
Metacritic	76/100
Review scores
Source	Rating
AllMusic	4/5 stars
Consequence	B−
Exclaim!	8/10
The Guardian	3/5 stars
HipHopDX	3.8/5
The Line of Best Fit	7.5/10
Pitchfork	7.9/10
PopMatters	8/10
Spin	7/10
XXL	3/5

Slime Season 3 was met with generally positive reviews. At Metacritic, which assigns a normalized rating out of 100 to reviews from mainstream publications, the mixtape received an average score of 76, based on 11 reviews. Aggregator AnyDecentMusic? gave it 7.2 out of 10, based on their assessment of the critical consensus.

James Wilt of Exclaim! said, "Every song justifies its spot: the Allen Ritter-produced "Drippin'" serves as a standout, exhibiting a staccato delivery and manic yelling, both of which are new to his already vast sonic vocabulary". Adam Kivel of Consequence said, "This record feels a little too brief, especially trailing off at the end. But if the chief complaint about a Young Thug record is that he's too focused, it shows he's honing in on that perfect blend that will launch him into the stratosphere". Narsimha Chintaluri of HipHopDX said, "Young Thug's extensive catalog is spotted with dynamic moments and this project seems to forgo such progressiveness. The range is still there, but sectioned into neatly packaged offerings". Brian Duricy of PopMatters said, "His delivery is somehow still getting better, and Slime Season 3 succeeds as an exercise in discovering just how elastic syllables are". Brooklyn Russell of Tiny Mix Tapes said, "Slime Season 3 is as celebratory, emotionally rich, and life-affirming as a good funeral should be but never is. And this isn't the end; it's only the beginning of a brand new chapter".

Brian Tabb of Pretty Much Amazing said, "Slime Season 3, while still with its flaws, is the perfect introduction to those wondering just where the hell popular hip-hop has come, gone, and will soon go in the snowballing south". Sheldon Pearce of Pitchfork said, "The tape plays like a final installment, going out with a bang and saving some of the series' best for last". Brian Josephs of Spin said, "Although Young Thug moves away from exploring emotional pain, SS3 is still very much informed by introspection". Tom Regel of The Line of Best Fit said, "This isn't one of the standout tapes in Thug's ever-expanding discography. But, as always, it signifies development, progression—most of it accessible on "Drippin'"". Lanre Bakare of The Guardian said, "Good as they are, there's nothing like Calling Your Name or Don't Know here, and its shorter tracklist means you're just getting teed up for the back nine when time is called. Having said that, it's free to download and another interesting release from hip-hop's most idiosyncratic talent". Scott Glaysher of XXL said, "Overall, Slime Season 3 stacks up well against Thug's colorful catalog and is undoubtedly the most listenable mixtape in the series thus far". Aron A of HotNewHipHop wrote that the album was "brief but colorful, never stagnant, and constantly pushing boundaries".

== Commercial performance ==
Slime Season 3 debuted at number seven on the US Billboard 200, moving 38,000 units: 22,000 in sales and an extra 16,000 in album equivalent units. It was the eighth highest-selling album of the week domestically.

== Track listing ==
Credits adapted from Tidal and BMI.

Slime Season 3 track listing
No.	Title	Writer(s)	Producer(s)	Length
1.	"With Them"	Jeffery Williams; Braylin Bowman; Michael Len Williams II	Mike Will Made It	3:17
2.	"Memo"	Williams; London Holmes	London on da Track	3:15
3.	"Drippin'"	Williams; Allen Ritter	Ritter	3:06
4.	"Slime Shit" (featuring Yak Gotti, Lil Duke and Peewee Roscoe)	Williams; Deamonte Kendrick; Arnold Martinez; Jimmy Winfrey; Wesley Glass; Ricky Harrell Jr.	Ricky Racks	4:38
5.	"Digits"	Williams; Holmes	London on da Track	2:56
6.	"Worth It"	Williams; Holmes; Christopher Brown; Brandon Hodge; Mark Pitts; Leon Youngblood Jr.	London on da Track	3:06
7.	"Tattoos"	Williams; Holmes	London on da Track	4:01
8.	"Problem"	Williams; David Cunningham; Isaac Bivens; Jamarii Massey	Isaac Flame; MariiBeatz	4:01
Total length:				28:20

== Charts ==
=== Weekly charts ===
Chart performance for Slime Season 3
Chart (2016)	Peak position
Canadian Albums (Billboard)	30
French Albums (SNEP)	161
US Billboard 200	7
US Top R&B/Hip-Hop Albums (Billboard)	3

=== Year-end charts ===
2016 year-end chart performance for Slime Season 3
Chart (2016)	Position
US Top R&B/Hip-Hop Albums (Billboard)	85

== Certifications ==
Certifications and sales for Slime Season 3
Region	Certification	Certified units/sales
United States (RIAA)	Gold	500,000^{‡}
^{‡} Sales+streaming figures based on certification alone.
