= Young Thug =

American rapper (born 1991)

- Young Thug in 2026
- Born: Jeffery Lamar Williams II; August 16, 1991 (age 35); Atlanta, Georgia, U.S.
- Other names: Sex; King Slime; Thugger; Spider; Young Truly Humble(d) Under God
- Occupations: Rapper; singer; songwriter
- Years active: 2010–present
- Works: Discography
- Partner(s): Mariah the Scientist (2021–present; engaged)
- Children: 6
- Awards: Full list
- Musical career
- Genres: Southern hip-hop; trap; mumble rap; progressive rap
- Labels: YSL; 300; Atlantic (current); Cash Money; 1017 Brick Squad (former)
- Member of: Bankroll Mafia; Rich Gang
- Website: iamuyscuti.com

Jeffery Lamar Williams II (born August 16, 1991), known professionally as Young Thug, (Note: (retroactively rendered as a backronym for Truly Humble(d) Under God)) is an American rapper and singer-songwriter. Known for his eccentric vocal style and fashion, he is considered an influential figure in modern hip-hop and trap music, and a popularizer of the mumble rap microgenre. Williams began his musical career in 2011, releasing a series of mixtapes beginning with I Came from Nothing. In 2013, he signed with fellow Atlanta rapper Gucci Mane's 1017 Records and gained further attention and praise for his debut mixtape with the label, 1017 Thug, released in February of that year.

Williams first received mainstream recognition in 2014 for his singles "Stoner" and "Danny Glover", in addition to his guest appearances on numerous singles, including T.I.'s "About the Money", Tyga's "Hookah", and Rich Gang's "Lifestyle". That same year, he released a mixtape with Rich Gang titled Rich Gang: Tha Tour Pt. 1, and signed a solo recording contract with 300 Entertainment, an imprint of Atlantic Records. In 2015, he released a number of mixtapes, including Barter 6 and two installments of his Slime Season series. Throughout 2016, Williams saw continued success with the release of his commercial mixtapes I'm Up, Slime Season 3, and Jeffery. In 2017, Williams guest performed on the worldwide hit "Havana" by singer Camila Cabello, which became his first number-one single on the Billboard Hot 100. The following year, he won the Grammy Award for Song of the Year for his contributions to Childish Gambino's "This Is America".

Williams' debut studio album So Much Fun (2019) peaked atop the US Billboard 200 and yielded the Billboard Hot 100 top-20 singles "The London" (featuring J. Cole and Travis Scott) and "Hot" (featuring Gunna). The following year, his single "Go Crazy"—with Chris Brown, from their collaborative mixtape Slime & B (2020)—peaked at number three on the chart and became his first top-ten single as a lead artist. That same year, he peaked the chart once more for his guest appearance alongside M.I.A. on Travis Scott's single "Franchise". In 2021, he did so for a third time with his guest appearance alongside Future on Drake's "Way 2 Sexy". His second studio album Punk was released in October of that year to continued success, followed by his third studio album, Business Is Business, released in 2023 while Williams was incarcerated in Georgia jail. In 2025, he released his fourth studio album UY Scuti, his first following his release from jail in 2024. In addition to his solo career, he has released three compilation albums with his record label YSL Records: Slime Language (2018), Slime Language 2 (2021) and Slime Language 3 (2026), with Slime Language 2 debuting atop the Billboard 200.

Williams has had multiple arrests and legal issues, most notably in 2022 when he was charged with violating the Georgia RICO Act and 63 counts of illegal substance trafficking or firearm possession, alongside 27 other members of YSL. He was held without bail in the Fulton County Jail on remand and his trial began in November 2023, lasting over a year and becoming the longest criminal trial in Georgia history. Williams was released in October 2024 after accepting a deal which saw him plead no contest to several charges; it resulted in him being sentenced to time served and 15 years of probation.

== Early life ==
Jeffery Lamar Williams was born on August 16, 1991, in Atlanta, Georgia, and is the tenth of eleven children. He is from Sylvan Hills, but grew up in the Jonesboro South projects near Cleveland Avenue. Other rappers from Jonesboro South include Waka Flocka Flame, Ludacris and Williams' childhood friend Peewee Longway, from whom Williams lived four doors down.

Williams was expelled in the sixth grade for breaking a teacher's arm. He was sent to juvenile prison for four years.

== Career ==
=== 2010–2013: Early career and record deal ===
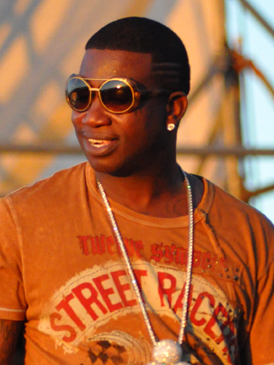
Gucci Mane (pictured) was the first to sign Young Thug.

Young Thug began his musical career in 2010, debuting with a guest appearance on rapper TruRoyal's song "She Can Go". After releasing the first three installments of his mixtape series I Came from Nothing throughout 2011 and 2012, Young Thug caught the attention of fellow Atlanta-based rapper Gucci Mane, who went on to sign Young Thug to his label 1017 Brick Squad Records, an Asylum and Atlantic imprint, in 2013. Thug released his first project on the label, his fourth mixtape, 1017 Thug.

The mixtape received positive reviews from critics, who praised its originality. It appeared in Pitchfork's Albums of the Year: Honorable Mention and Complex's list of The 50 Best Albums of 2013. Fact named it the best mixtape of the year, while Rolling Stone ranked it fifth in its 10 Best Mixtapes of 2013, and The Guardian included it among The Five Best Mixtapes of 2013. In a broader retrospective, Pitchfork placed the mixtape at number 96 in its list of the best albums of the first half of the 2010s. The track "Picacho" was similarly well-received, appearing in Rolling Stone's 100 Best Songs of 2013, Pitchfork's The Top 100 Tracks of 2013, and Spin's 50 Best Songs of 2013.

In July 2013, Complex included him in their list of 25 New Rappers to Watch Out For. In October 2013, Young Thug released his commercial debut single "Stoner". The song spawned a number of unofficial remixes by several rappers such as Wale, Jim Jones, Jadakiss, Iamsu! and Trick-Trick. Young Thug expressed his disapproval for the remixes, commenting "If you feel like my song isn't tough enough to the point where you have to freestyle ... Don't think I'm happy that you're doing it because of who you are. I'm ready for war."

His song "Danny Glover" received a number of remixes by Waka Flocka Flame and Nicki Minaj, among others. In October 2013, Young Thug appeared on several tracks on 19 & Boomin by Metro Boomin, including "Some More", the first song he made with Alex Tumay, who became his go-to engineer for almost everything from then until Slime Season 2. In December 2013, Thug performed at Fool's Gold Day Off show in Miami, among Danny Brown, Trick Daddy and Travis Scott.

=== 2014–2016: Rise to popularity, label issues, Barter 6 and Slime Season series ===
In January 2014, Young Thug revealed that he had been offered $8.5 million to sign to rapper Future's Freebandz record label. In March 2014, Young Thug's affiliation with Cash Money Records and its CEO, Birdman, led to speculation about him signing to the label, though the label's publicist later denied the rumors. On March 28, 2014, Ronald "Caveman" Rosario, director of Urban Music at 1017 Distribution, addressed the situation, stating that Young Thug signed a management deal—not a record deal—with Birdman's Rich Gang, and is still signed to 1017 Brick Squad.

In 2014, Young Thug recorded several songs with Kanye West, who praised him for his ability to make songs quickly. Thug announced that he had upcoming mixtapes with Rich Homie Quan, Chief Keef and Bloody Jay. Young Thug would go on to be featured on the March 2014 cover of The Fader. On March 11, 2014, his debut single "Stoner" was serviced to rhythmic contemporary radio in the United States by Asylum and Atlantic Records. On March 24, 2014, Young Thug stated his debut album would be titled Carter VI, referencing the highly acclaimed Tha Carter album series by American hip-hop superstar Lil Wayne, who has been the biggest influence in Young Thug's music career.

Two days later, it was revealed that Young Thug was working on a collaborative album with American record producer Metro Boomin, which was titled Metro Thuggin and set for release in spring 2014. The first song from the project, titled "The BLanguage", which uses elements from Canadian rapper Drake's "The Language", was released the same day. In April 2014, Young Thug released a new 808 Mafia-produced song titled "Eww", which was named one of the five best songs of the week by XXL. A remix of the song was supposed to be on Thug's debut album with verses from Lil Wayne and Drake, but did not come to fruition.

On June 17, 2014, Kevin Liles confirmed that Young Thug had been officially signed to his and Lyor Cohen's label 300 Entertainment. On July 1, 2014, Asylum Records and Atlantic Records officially released Young Thug's 2013 fan-favorite song "Danny Glover", re-titling it "2 Bitches". Also on July 1, Mass Appeal Records released "Old English", the first single from their compilation album Mass Appeal Vol. 1, which features Young Thug alongside fellow American rappers ASAP Ferg and Freddie Gibbs. On October 16, 2014, "Take Kare" featuring Young Thug and Lil Wayne was released; it was the first single from Cash Money Records's Rich Gang 2 compilation. The December 4, 2014, issue of Rolling Stone called Young Thug the "most exciting new voice of hip-hop" and "hip-hop's new crown prince". At the end of the year, music critic Robert Christgau named Black Portland—Young Thug's collaborative mixtape with Bloody Jay—the fourth best album of 2014.

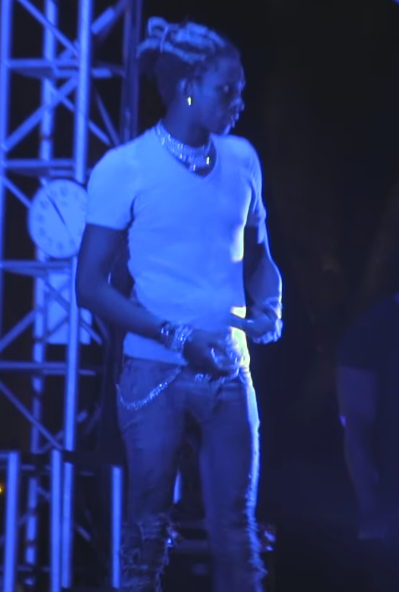
Young Thug performing in 2016

In 2015, a series of data breaches resulted in the release of hundreds of tracks from Young Thug's archives to the Internet. Young Thug's planned debut album was set for release in 2015, and was said to be named Carter 6, in homage to Lil Wayne's upcoming album, Tha Carter V. Lil Wayne was not happy about the tribute, telling the audience of a show in April 2015 to "stop listening" to Young Thug. After saying he had been threatened with lawsuits, Young Thug announced that he was changing the title to Barter 6 and clarified that it would be a mixtape rather than his debut album. Young Thug announced April 18, 2015, that his official debut album will be titled Hy!£UN35, to be read as "HiTunes".

In May 2015, after much confusion as to who he was signed to and managed by, having been aligned with Gucci Mane's 1017 Records, Future's Freebandz, Lyor Cohen's 300 Entertainment and Birdman's Rich Gang, Young Thug revealed "I manage myself. I'm signed with Atlantic. I have a big, special deal with Atlantic, and it's only Atlantic. Birdman is my homie."

In 2015, Thug released the compilation mixtapes Slime Season and Slime Season 2, which were well received. Young Thug revealed in late June 2015 that he and Kanye West discussed the prospect of a joint album together. Thug said Kanye was impressed after previewing his unreleased music. "I was letting him hear all the music. Then he said I was like Bob Marley and he wanted to do an album with me. I was like, 'Let's roll!'" the rapper said. Young Thug appeared on West's 2016 album The Life of Pablo, and West tweeted that he would release further collaborations with Young Thug on Tidal.

In July 2015, 300 Entertainment released a promotional single, "Pacifier", in support of Young Thug's debut album Hy!£UN35. The song features production from Mike Will Made It, and was noted by critics for its experimentation with more extreme vocal scatting. On February 4, 2016, Young Thug released a mixtape titled I'm Up. On March 26, 2016, he released the final installment of the Slime Season series with Slime Season 3, declaring the mixtape the end of a phase marked by leaked material. Young Thug toured the United States on his May 2016 HiTunes tour, which featured artists Dae Dae, TM88, and Rich The Kid.

=== 2016–2018: Jeffery and collaborations ===
Young Thug was featured in Calvin Klein's Fall 2016 fashion campaign, along with Frank Ocean among others. On July 9, 2016, he announced his self-titled mixtape Jeffery was coming out soon. On August 16, 2016, Thug announced he would change his name to "No, My Name Is Jeffery" for the week of Jeffery's release. The album artwork features Young Thug with his face obscured wearing a dress designed by Italian designer Alessandro Trincone, and was photographed by Garfield Lamond. The artwork went viral and prompted a wide range of responses on social media. In November 2016, he announced he was starting his own record label imprint called YSL Records.

In March 2017, Young Thug was featured on the songs "Sacrifices" and "Ice Melts" from Drake's commercial mixtape More Life. He was featured on Calvin Harris' song "Heatstroke" along with Ariana Grande and Pharrell Williams, released in March 2017. In April 2017, Young Thug announced the commercial mixtape Beautiful Thugger Girls, originally titled E.B.B.T.G. The project was executive-produced by Drake and was released on June 16, 2017. In August, Thug featured on Camila Cabello's single "Havana", which peaked at number one on the Billboard Hot 100, marking his first number-one hit. In September 2017, he released a joint EP with DJ Carnage titled Young Martha. In October 2017, Thug released a collaborative mixtape with Future titled Super Slimey. It includes tracks recorded by each of the artists individually as well as both together, and features guest vocals from rapper Offset.

In 2018, Young Thug released the single "Ride for Me", a collaboration by A-Trak, Falcons, and 24hrs via A-Trak's record label Fool's Gold. He released the EP Hear No Evil in April 2018. Young Thug co-wrote and provided background vocals on Childish Gambino's "This Is America", which debuted at number one on the Billboard Hot 100 chart for May 19, 2018. In August 2018, he released another compilation album, Slime Language.

=== 2019–2022: So Much Fun, Slime & B, and Punk ===
On May 23, 2019, Young Thug released the single "The London", featuring American rappers J. Cole and Travis Scott. On the same day, he also announced his forthcoming debut studio album, which was originally called Gold Mouf Dog. On July 19, 2019, Young Thug announced that the album had been renamed to So Much Fun. On August 10, 2019, Young Thug announced the album's release date and cover art. The track listing was revealed on August 15. The album was released on August 16, 2019, the rapper's 28th birthday. It features guest appearances from Future, Machine Gun Kelly, Gunna, Lil Baby, Lil Uzi Vert, Lil Duke, 21 Savage, Doe Boy, Lil Keed, Quavo, Juice Wrld, Nav, J. Cole, and Travis Scott. The album debuted at number one on the US Billboard 200.

On October 20, 2019, Young Thug appeared on The Tonight Show Starring Jimmy Fallon alongside rapper and fellow labelmate Gunna. On October 31, 2019, "Hot", a song from So Much Fun which featured Gunna, received a remix with an additional feature from Travis Scott. The deluxe edition of the album was released on December 20, 2019, with extra guest appearances from Gunna and Travis Scott as well as the "Hot" remix.

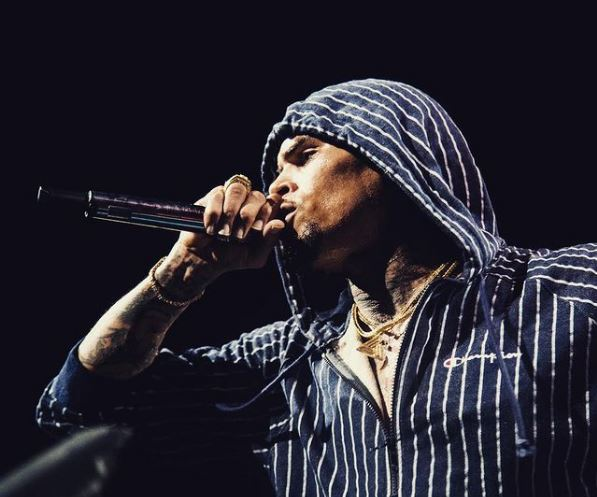
Slime & B, his 2020 collaborative mixtape with Chris Brown (pictured), spawned the single "Go Crazy", Thug's highest-charting single as a lead artist.

On April 29, 2020, Young Thug and American singer Chris Brown announced their collaborative mixtape, Slime & B. It was released on May 5, 2020, and features guest appearances from Major Nine, Gunna, Lil Duke, Too Short, E-40, HoodyBaby, and Future. The mixtape's lead single, "Go Crazy", peaked at number three on the Billboard Hot 100, becoming Thug's highest-charting single as a lead artist. On September 25, Thug was featured alongside British rapper M.I.A. on Travis Scott's single "Franchise", which debuted at number one on the Billboard Hot 100, marking Thug's second number-one single. By the end of the year, he had fourteen chart entries on the Hot 100, due to several collaborations with other artists.

On April 16, 2021, YSL Records, along with Young Thug and Gunna, released their second compilation album Slime Language 2. The album debuted at number one on the Billboard 200 and included guest appearances from Travis Scott, Drake, Rowdy Rebel, Lil Baby, YTB Trench, Lil Uzi Vert, Coi Leray, Big Sean, Nav, Skepta, Future, YNW Melly, BSlime, Sheck Wes, and Kid Cudi, with production mainly handled by Southside, Wheezy, and Turbo. It was supported by two singles, "Take It to Trial" and "That Go!". A deluxe edition was released on April 23, containing eight new songs and featuring artists such as DaBaby and Don Toliver.

In July 2021, Young Thug advertised his second studio album Punk with a release date of October 15, 2021. The album was originally announced in August 2019 and was expected shortly after the release of So Much Fun. "Tick Tock" was released as the intended lead single from the album, on August 20, 2021, but was excluded from the final track listing. In September 2021, Thug reached number one on the Billboard Hot 100 for the third time in his career with his feature alongside Future on "Way 2 Sexy", the lead single off Drake's album Certified Lover Boy. On October 15, Thug released his album Punk.

In November 2021, Kobalt Music Group announced a new global publishing deal with Young Thug, in which the company would handle his publishing administration, global sync, and creative services.

=== 2023–present: Business Is Business and UY Scuti ===
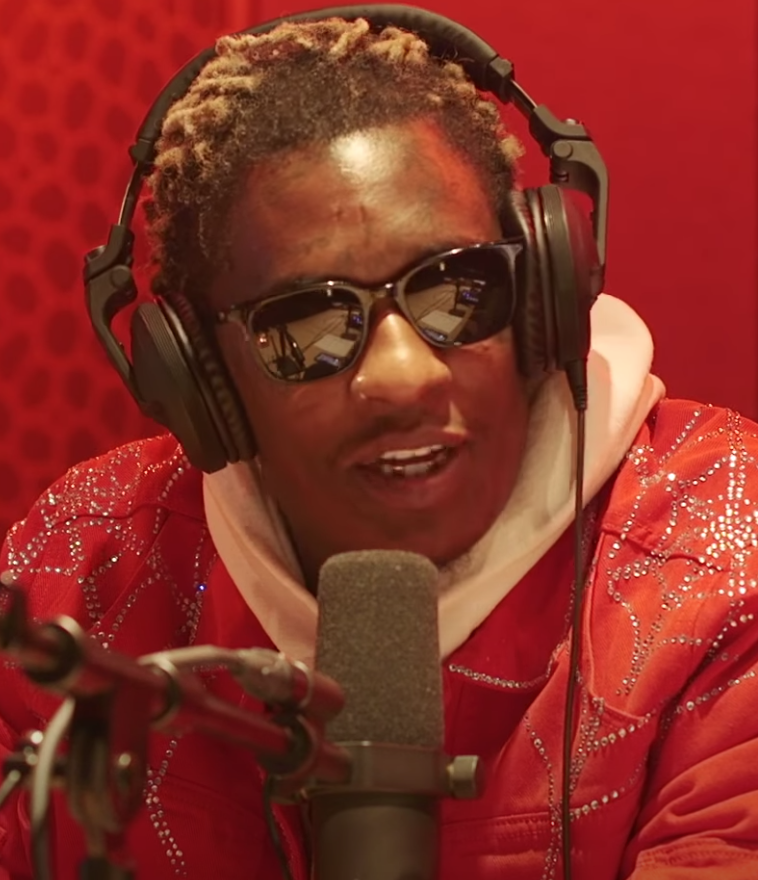
Young Thug in 2021

In June 2023, while incarcerated, Young Thug's social media accounts posted a QR code which led to a countdown which was set to conclude on June 23. Many of Thug's peers reposted the code, with Metro Boomin confirming that he executive-produced his upcoming album shortly after. On June 23, Young Thug's third studio album, Business Is Business was released with features from Drake, Travis Scott, Future, Lil Uzi Vert, 21 Savage, and more, making it Thug's first project released since his May 2022 arrest. The album debuted at number three on the Billboard 200 chart, moving 89,000 album-equivalent units in its first week. The album was supported by the single, "Oh U Went" featuring Drake which peaked within the top twenty of the Billboard Hot 100. The following month, Thug appeared as a feature on "Skitzo", the fourteenth cut of Travis Scott's Utopia.

In January 2024, Thug appeared alongside Metro Boomin on "Pop Ur Shit", the sixth cut of 21 Savage's American Dream. In August, he appeared on "River", the eleventh cut of ¥$'s Vultures 2. In the same month, he made a guest appearance on Drake's "It's Up" alongside 21 Savage. Following Thug's release from jail in late 2024, in January 2025, he appeared as a feature alongside Future on "Dum, Dumb, and Dumber", the second cut from Lil Baby's WHAM. The track marked Thug's first official release since his release. In March, he appeared alongside Ty Dolla Sign as a feature on "We Need All Da Vibes", the twenty-first cut from Playboi Carti's highly anticipated studio album, Music.

In April 2025, Thug announced his fourth studio album, UY Scuti. It was released on September 26, 2025, and debuted at number six on the Billboard 200, his ninth top-ten entry. UY Scuti received mixed reviews from critics, who found it disjointed. It generated controversy for the cover art, which features Thug in whiteface, and the opening track "Ninja", in which he repeatedly uses the racial slur nigger; Pitchfork described it as "bottom-of-the-barrel edgelord trolling".

On August 28, 2026, Thug released his third compilation album Slime Language 3, it serves as the final installment to the Slime Language trilogy. In support of the project, he embarked on "The New Generation Tour" in North America and Europe in 2026, with support from Nav and YSL signees Oruam, Tezzus, Diamond*, 1300Saint, Iyrus, Yume, Biggs, and Unky.

== Artistry ==
=== Musical style and influence ===
Young Thug has received both praise and criticism for his eccentric vocal style, which has been described as departing from traditional rap lyricism and sometimes intelligible meaning. Jeff Weiss of BBC called him the "most influential rapper of the 21st century." According to The Fader, "in a typical Young Thug verse, he slurs, shouts, whines and sings, feverishly contorting his voice into a series of odd timbres like a beautifully played but broken wind instrument." Pitchfork called his style "extraordinarily distinctive" and "a weird, experimental approach to rapping" while praising his "presence, persona, mystique, and, potentially, star power".

Billboard wrote that "Thug uses this multiplicative vocal delivery to his advantage: where another rapper might lapse into repetition, he finds a new way to distress and warp his tone, to burrow resourcefully into rhythmic cracks and crevices." Complex noted his aptitude for creating catchy, melodic hooks. XXL called him a "rap weirdo", stating that "Thug's charisma, unhinged flow and hooks make his music intriguing." Critic Sheldon Pearce wrote that "Thug understands the modern pop song construction better than anyone: anything and everything can be a hook."

Young Thug has been noted for his fast working method, with several collaborators observing his tendency to freestyle tracks live in the studio or quickly develop lyrics on the spot. He doesn't write down lyrics on paper, but has been known to plan lyrics by drawing shapes and signs. Consequence of Sound stated that "his work is constantly rooted in improvisation, an inherently thrilling concept that's embedded itself in black music." Discussing his work, Williams has claimed the ability to write a hit song in ten minutes and said "I'm in the studio so much, I'll just try stuff. I just think and try, think and try. I don't really know how to sing, but I've been trying for years." Young Thug has cited American rapper Lil Wayne as his biggest idol and influence. In an interview with Complex magazine he said, "I want to get in the studio with Wayne more than anybody in the world." He has cited mentor Gucci Mane and Kanye West as influences.

=== Image and fashion ===
Vibe Magazine called Young Thug "one of the most unpredictable, charismatic, and outlandish personalities in hip-hop today." Rovi called him a "fashion icon". His wardrobe has been described as eccentric and consists predominantly of women's clothing, which he has preferred to wear since age 12. The Seattle Times wrote that "with a fashion sense as unconventional as his rapping, Young Thug can regularly be seen on his Instagram account rocking painted fingernails, skintight jeans or a kids-size dress as a shirt, which, along with his habit of regularly referring to close male friends as 'hubbie' or 'lover' has led to rumors about his sexual orientation."

In an advertisement for Calvin Klein, Thug proclaimed "In my world, you can be a gangsta with a dress or you can be a gangsta with baggy pants." Fusion described him as "defying gender stereotypes and agitating the way hip-hop defines black masculinity, through his eccentric sense of style." He has been compared to David Bowie, Prince, and Little Richard. The media has called him gender fluid and androgynous. GQ called him "at once a hero and an outsider and a leader of the psychedelic fashion movement of rap hippies."

In February 2018, Young Thug rebranded himself as "Sex".

== Personal life ==
Young Thug has six children by four women: three sons and three daughters. He became a father at the age of 17. In April 2015, he became engaged to Jerrika Karlae, who runs a swimsuit line and whose mother managed the late Young Dolph. Thug bought his first home in September 2016 after the release of his mixtape Jeffery. The home, in Buckhead, Atlanta, is more than 11,000 square-feet and has six bedrooms, eleven bathrooms, a full bar, a theater room, and a four-car garage.

During his childhood, one of Thug's older brothers was shot and killed in front of his family's home.

In April 2020, during a concert livestream, Thug revealed a recent near-death experience of his, stating:

I kinda just stayed in the bed and I was like, 'Yo, call the ambulance. I can't move my body, then later, when the ambulance came, I couldn't get out of bed. They had to get me out of the bed, basically. I felt like my whole body was numb and I couldn't move. I went to the hospital and I had found out that I had liver and kidney failure. And I kinda had sorta passed away, like I kinda died.

In December 2020, Young Thug broke up with his fiancée Jerrika Karlae. In 2021, Thug began to date singer-songwriter Mariah the Scientist. They briefly ended their relationship in October 2025, then got engaged two months later during a concert in Atlanta.

=== Views and philanthropy ===
In December 2016, Thug joined the #fightpovertyagain campaign. On June 29, 2017, Thug donated all proceeds of a sold-out concert to Planned Parenthood, stating on Twitter that "I was a teenage parent. Planned+unplanned parenthood is beautiful."

In 2025, Thug expressed support for Sean Combs amidst his federal racketeering trial and sexual misconduct allegations. He called Kid Cudi a "rat" for testifying against Combs in May, and called for Combs' freedom during a livestream with Adin Ross in October.

== Legal issues ==
In April 2015, after a Lil Wayne tour bus was fired at by members of the Bloods street gang, Young Thug was among those sued by the bus driver alongside Cash Money Records, Young Money Entertainment, and Birdman.

A lawsuit was filed against Thug in January 2017 after he failed to show up at a concert in Sahlen's Stadium after he signed a $55,000 contract. This was not the first time a lawsuit was filed against him for not appearing at a concert, as a Texas production company had done the same in April 2016 after he failed to perform at a concert.

Thug was cleared of battery in April 2017 after reportedly slapping a woman outside a nightclub the previous month. The woman was arguing with Thug's fiancée, Jerrika Karlae, when Thug allegedly stepped in and struck the woman. The charges were dropped due to a lack of evidence.

Young Thug's gun and drug charges were dropped in April 2017 following a raid of his home in Sandy Springs, Georgia, which resulted in him being charged with felony cocaine possession, felony marijuana possession, and three counts of felony gun possession. Thug's lawyers argued that police conducted the search without a warrant, which led to the district attorney dropping all charges except felony marijuana possession. It was reported in April 2017 that Thug was being sued by Heritage Select Homes for owing almost $2.2 million in house payments.

On September 24, 2017, Thug was arrested in Brookhaven, Georgia, on multiple drug possession charges and possession of a firearm. He was released on bond three days later. On September 7, 2018, he was charged with possession and intent to distribute meth, hydrocodone, and marijuana. He was also charged with possession of amphetamine, alprazolam, codeine (2 counts), and a firearm; this indictment was related to his 2017 arrest.

Young Thug's mugshot from his May 2022 arrest

On May 9, 2022, Thug was arrested in Atlanta on gang-related charges. Thug and Gunna were among the 28 people associated with YSL who were charged in a 56-count Georgia RICO (Racketeer Influenced and Corrupt Organizations) Act indictment filed by Fulton County District Attorney Fani Willis. Following a search of his home, he was charged with seven additional felonies related to possession of illegal substances and illegal firearms. He was held at the Fulton County Superior Court. He was denied bond several times and remained in the Cobb County Jail until his release on October 31, 2024.

His state RICO criminal trial began on November 27, 2023, Five of his co-defendants stood trial with him. On December 12, 2023, it was agreed that the continuation of the trial would be delayed until January 2024 after his co-defendant Shannon Stillwell was stabbed multiple times during a fight that occurred in the Fulton County Jail. The trial resumed on January 2, 2024. On October 31, 2024, Williams was released from jail after he accepted a plea deal and was sentenced to 40 years: 5 years in prison, 15 years of probation, and a backload of 20 years in prison if probation is violated. Williams' 5 years in prison has been commuted to time served. Williams' release and probation stipulations include him being banned from the Metro Atlanta area for 10 years, not making gang-related music, and making four annual anti-gang presentations/concerts for Atlanta, along with having no contact with known gang members or co-defendants (other than Gunna and his biological brother, both of whom were among his co-defendants).

Starting in August 2025, various jail calls of Williams have leaked, allegedly dissing various figures such as Gunna, Kendrick Lamar, Future, GloRilla, J. Cole, Drake, and André 3000, as well as implying that Business Is Business, alongside Gunna's albums A Gift & a Curse and DS4Ever, had their Billboard numbers inflated by fake streams.

== Discography ==
Studio albums

- So Much Fun (2019)
- Punk (2021)
- Business Is Business (2023)
- UY Scuti (2025)

Compilation albums

- Slime Language (with YSL Records) (2018)
- Slime Language 2 (with YSL Records and Gunna) (2021)
- Slime Language 3 (with YSL Records) (2026)

== Tours ==
=== Headlining ===
- HiTunes Tour (2015)
- HiHorse'd Tour (2016)
- Justin Bieber Big Tour (2019)
- The New Generation Tour (2026)

=== Supporting act ===
- Rodeo Tour (with Travis Scott) (2015)
- Boy Meets World Tour (with Drake) (2017)
- Nobody Safe Tour (with Future) (2017)
- KOD Tour (with J. Cole) (2018)

== Awards and nominations ==
Year	Awards	Category	Nominated work	Result
2014	BET Hip Hop Awards	Who Blew Up	Himself	Nominated
2014	BET Hip Hop Awards	Made-You-Look Award (Best Hip-Hop Style)	Himself	Nominated
2014	BET Hip Hop Awards	Best Club Banger	"Stoner"	Nominated
2015	BET Awards	Coca-Cola Viewers' Choice Award	"Throw Sum Mo" (with Rae Sremmurd and Nicki Minaj)	Nominated
2017	MTV Video Music Award	Best Editing	"Wyclef Jean"	Won
2017	UK Music Video Awards	Video of the Year	"Wyclef Jean"	Won
2017	UK Music Video Awards	Best Urban Video	"Wyclef Jean"	Won
2017	UK Music Video Awards	Best Editing in a Video	"Wyclef Jean"	Won
2017	UK Music Video Awards	Vevo Must See Award	"Wyclef Jean"	Nominated
2017	UK Music Video Awards	Best Production Design in a Video	"Homie"	Nominated
2018	MTV Video Music Award	Video of the Year	"Havana" (with Camila Cabello)	Won
2018	MTV Video Music Award	Song of the Year	"Havana" (with Camila Cabello)	Nominated
2018	MTV Video Music Award	Best Pop Video	"Havana" (with Camila Cabello)	Nominated
2018	MTV Video Music Award	Best Choreography	"Havana" (with Camila Cabello)	Nominated
2018	American Music Awards	Collaboration of the Year	"Havana" (with Camila Cabello)	Won
2018	American Music Awards	Video of the Year	"Havana" (with Camila Cabello)	Won
2018	American Music Awards	Favorite Pop/Rock Song	"Havana" (with Camila Cabello)	Won
2018	iHeartRadio Titanium Award	1 Billion Total Audience Spins on iHeartRadio Stations	"Havana" (with Camila Cabello)	Won
2019	Grammy Awards	Song of the Year	"This Is America" (with Childish Gambino)	Won
2019	MTV Video Music Awards	Song of the Summer	"Goodbyes" (with Post Malone)	Nominated
2019	MTV Video Music Awards	Song of the Summer	"The London" (with J.Cole and Travis Scott)	Nominated
2020	Grammy Awards	Best Rap/Sung Performance	"The London" (with J.Cole and Travis Scott)	Nominated
2021	iHeartRadio Music Awards	R&B Song of the Year	"Go Crazy" (with Chris Brown)	Won
2022	Grammy Awards	Album of the Year	Planet Her (Deluxe) (as a featured artist)	Nominated
2022	Grammy Awards	Album of the Year	Donda (as a featured artist)	Nominated
2023	Grammy Awards	Best Rap Performance	"Pushin P" (with Gunna and Future)	Nominated
2023	Grammy Awards	Best Rap Song	"Pushin P" (with Gunna and Future)	Nominated
