= Wheezy =

American record producer from Mississippi

- Also known as: Wheezy Beats; Wheezy Outta Here; Tsunami
- Born: Wesley Tyler Grass; October 26, 1992 (age 33); Vicksburg, Mississippi U.S.
- Genres: Hip hop; trap; R&B
- Occupations: Record producer; songwriter
- Years active: 2013–present
- Label: Ultra

Wesley Tyler Glass (born October 26, 1992), known professionally as Wheezy, is an American record producer and songwriter. Recognized by his producer tag "Wheezy Outta Here!" (uttered by frequent collaborator Future), he has been credited on commercially successful singles and albums for high-profile music industry artists, mainly in hip-hop. He has produced for Kanye West, Lil Uzi Vert, Young Thug, Lil Baby, Future, Nav, 21 Savage, Gunna, Travis Scott, Meek Mill, King Von, Lil Durk, Playboi Carti and Lil Wayne among others.

Gaining prominence in the late 2010s, Wheezy has produced the Billboard Hot 100-top ten singles "Yes Indeed" by Lil Baby and "Going Bad" by Meek Mill. He solely produced the entirety of Gunna's debut extended play (EP), Drip or Drown (2017), and later served as executive producer alongside Turbo and Young Thug for Gunna's first two studio albums, Drip or Drown 2 (2019) and Wunna (2020) while producing the majority of both. As of 2020, he was working on an album of his own, which he had hoped to release before the end of 2022 via his own label, Tsunami Boys. He later worked with Playboi Carti and served as a producer for his album Music (2025).

== Early life and career ==
Wesley Tyler Glass was born on October 26, 1992, in Vicksburg, Mississippi where his mother originates from, while his father is from Atlanta, Georgia. He traveled back and forth before settling in Atlanta.

Glass started making beats at the age of 15 for his brother, who went by TG Montana and Flyguy Tana and taught him how to work within FL Studio. He then started working with Shad da God, who previously went by Rich Kid Shawty, an original member of Rich Kidz. Wheezy has been given production advice from experienced producers such as Metro Boomin, Southside, Sonny Digital and Lex Luger whom he has gotten the chance to collaborate with. His first major placement was a production for Rich Homie Quan on Rich Gang: Tha Tour Pt. 1 (2014).

Glass's younger brother is also a record producer under the stage name BabyWave and co-produced the Young Thug and Gunna song "Ski" with him.

== Production style and influences ==
The Fader wrote that Wheezy's production "tends toward the spacious and spare", and gave him credit for "much of the opaque, pristine production of 2015's Barter 6, and several highlights from the Slime Season series". He uses FL Studio, along with the M-Audio Oxygen 88 keyboard. Glass often utilizes samples, especially vintage sounds. He says he "blends" his snares. He frequently uses the VST Purity, which he has used since his early days as a producer. Glass' influences include Drumma Boy, Shawty Redd, DJ Toomp, and WondaGurl. His productions can be recognized by producer tag "Wheezy outta here".

== See also ==
- Lil Wayne
- Future
- Metro Boomin
- Record Producers
- Wheezy (disambiguation)
