= Keed Talk to 'Em 2 =

Studio album by Lil Keed
- Released: March 17, 2023
- Length: 63:42
- Labels: YSL; 300
- Producers: Aarne; Aidan Han; AJax; AJCookin; Bankroll Got It; Benji; BlazeOnDaBeatz; Bloublood; Bryvn; CB; Chubbs; Desro; Diego Ave; Diormade; Distance Decay; Einer Bankz; Emman; Foster; Grimlin; Gxra; HGbeatzzz; Jee; JetsonMade; Kimchi; Levi Bandito; London on da Track; LukeComeOn; Mars; Grimlin; DoppyBeatz; NikoTheGreat; Rip; Saucemankeys; Shottie; Sidereal; SkiPass; Wheezy; Wiogotitturnt; Zkup

Lil Keed chronology
Trapped on Cleveland 3 (2020)	Keed Talk to 'Em 2 (2023)

Singles from Keed Talk to 'Em 2
- 1. "Long Way to Go" Released: February 3, 2023; 2. "Self Employed" Released: March 8, 2023

Keed Talk to 'Em 2 is the third and final studio album by American rapper Lil Keed. It was posthumously released through YSL Records and 300 Entertainment on March 17, 2023. The album features guest appearances from JetsonMade, Nav, Lil Gotit, Big Sean, Offset, Trippie Redd, KayCyy, Young Thug, Cordae, Karlae, Lil Jairmy, Dolly White, StickBaby, and Fridayy. Production was handled by JetsonMade himself, Sidereal, Benji, Mars, HGbeatzzz, SkiPass, Distance Decay, Aarne, Rip, Chubbs, Saucemankeys, Jee, Diormade, Zkup, Wiogotitturnt, BlazeOnDaBeatz, Levi Bandito, CB, AJCookin, Aidan Han, AJax, Shottie, London on da Track, Desro, Bankroll Got It, DoppyBeatz, Diego Ave, Einer Bankz, Foster, LukeComeOn, Wheezy, BlouBlood, Gxra, Kimchi, Grimlin, Emman, Bryvn, and NikoTheGreat. The album was entirely mastered by Joe LaPorta and was supported by two singles, "Long Way to Go" and "Self Employed". It serves as the sequel to Keed's 2018 mixtape, Keed Talk to 'Em.

== Background and promotion ==
On January 30, 2023, Keed's mother, Tonnie "HoodMama" Woods-Reed, wrote a note about her son and the progress of the album and posted it to his Instagram account, which read:

On May 13, 2022, I lost my son Raqhid Render – who many of you knew as the artist Lil Keed. While this journey through the different phases of grief has been indescribably hard, a way that I have found to cope is through his music. Right before his passing, Keed was hard at work at what would've been his highly anticipated next album, Keed Talk To 'Em 2.

As much as he was a great father, son and friend – he was also an artist who (thanks to many of you) lived and continues to live through his music. With that being said, the time has come to share some of our last pieces of Keed with you all starting with the release of his first single "Long Way To Go" this Friday. This song holds a special place in my heart, and as you guys will see, it will reflect on many aspects of Keed's journey here on Earth.

Long Live Keed!

On March 3, 2023, the cover art and release date for the album was revealed. Four days later, the tracklist was revealed.

After the album's release, Keed's music video for the song "Hitman" was released on the same day. At the end of the video is a message to fans from Keed's family, explaining that this is the rapper's final music video.

=== Singles ===
The lead single of the album, "Long Way to Go" was released on February 3, 2023. The second single, "Self Employed", was released on March 8, 2023.

== Track listing ==
Keed Talk to 'Em 2 track listing
No.	Title	Writer(s)	Producer(s)	Length
1.	"Go See"	Raqhid Render; Samuel Matthew; Benjamin Ortega; Marcel Korkutata; HGbeatzzz	Sidereal; Benji; Mars; HGbeatzzz	2:17
2.	"Bags to the Sky" (with JetsonMade)	R. Render; Tahj Morgan	JetsonMade	2:37
3.	"Muso Kuso" (featuring Nav)	R. Render; Navraj Goraya; Kulachkov Evich; Derek Mondock; Mircea Papusoi; Jean Marie	SkiPass; Distance Decay; Aarne; Rip	2:38
4.	"SRT" (featuring Lil Gotit)	R. Render; Semaja Render; Chubbs; Saucemankeys	Chubbs; Saucemankeys	2:30
5.	"Hottest" (featuring Big Sean)	R. Render; Sean Anderson; Matthew; Joseph Langston; Samuel Jones; Zachary Kupiec; Wiogotitturnt	Sidereal; Jee; Diormade; Zkup; Wiogotitturnt	3:10
6.	"How Many" (featuring Offset)	R. Render; Kiari Cephus; BlazeOnDaBeatz; Kupiec	BlazeOnDaBeatz; Zkup	3:28
7.	"Get Money" (with Trippie Redd)	R. Render; Michael White II; Matthew; Levi Bandito; Christopher Barnett	Sidereal; Levi Bandito; CB	3:26
8.	"Think About It"	R. Render; Matthew; AJCookin; Bandito	Sidereal; AJCookin; Bandito	3:24
9.	"Long Way to Go"	R. Render; Matthew; Aidan Han; Anand Joshi	Sidereal; Han; AJax	2:57
10.	"Can't Fall Victim" (featuring KayCyy)	R. Render; Mark Mbogo; Matthew; Bandito; Ashot Akopian	Sidereal; Bandito; Shottie	2:53
11.	"All I Wanna Know" (featuring Young Thug)	R. Render; Jeffery Williams; London Holmes	London on da Track	3:26
12.	"Lost My Trust" (featuring Cordae)	R. Render; Cordae Dunston; Matthew; Korkutata; Desro; Bandito	Sidereal; Mars; Desro; Bandito	3:23
13.	"Hitman"	R. Render; Joel Banks; Taylor Banks	Bankroll Got It	2:50
14.	"Betty Boop" (featuring Karlae)	R. Render; Jerrika Karlae; J. Banks; T. Banks; Diego Avendano	Bankroll Got It; Diego Ave	3:30
15.	"Off Land" (featuring Lil Jairmy)	R. Render; Jairmy Long; Einer Bankz; Zachary Foster; Luke Walker	Bankz; Foster; LukeComeOn	3:20
16.	"Big Bag" (featuring Dolly White and Young Thug)	R. Render; Dolly White; Williams; Wesley Glass	Wheezy	3:39
17.	"Kick Back" (featuring Lil Gotit and StickBaby)	R. Render; S. Render; Don StickBaby; Isaiah Blouir; Gerardo Rangel; Nelida Yew	BlouBlood; Gxra; Kimchi	3:20
18.	"Self Employed"	R. Render; Pierre Poretti; Emmanuel Bekele; Kapembwa Yamba	Grimlin; DoppyBeatz; Emman	2:51
19.	"Love Me Again"	R. Render		4:03
20.	"Thank You Lord" (with Fridayy)	R. Render; Francis LeBlanc; Matthew; Bryan Yepes; Aniko Thomas	Sidereal; Bryvn; NikoTheGreat	3:47
Total length:				63:42
