= Hood Baby 2 =

Studio album by Lil Gotit
- Released: April 24, 2020
- Genre: Hip hop; trap
- Length: 58:47
- Label: Alamo
- Producer: 10Fifty; ATP; Beat Dilla; Belin; CakeBoy Bally; David Morse; D. Hill; DMC Global; Dvtchie; Foster; Fraxille; Hurtboy AG; Jonah Abraham; Kay9ine; KayJay Beatz; Kenny Stuntin; Kid Hazel; Kiecarson; Lil Wylo; MelodicDesert; Nikita3x; Q-Haze Beats; RokOnTheTrack; Star Boy; YoungProducersMafia

Lil Gotit chronology
A-Team (2020)	Hood Baby 2 (2020)	Top Chef Gotit (2021)

Singles from Hood Baby 2
- 1. "Bricks In the Attic" Released: April 10, 2020; 2. "Never Legit" Released: April 17, 2020

Professional ratings
Review scores
Source	Rating
HipHopDX	3.0/5

Hood Baby 2 is the third studio album by American rapper Lil Gotit. It was released on April 24, 2020, by Alamo Records.

== Background ==
The album features 18 songs and collaborators including Gunna, Lil Keed, Future, Lil Yachty, Guap Tarantino, among others. It was named as a sequel to Gotit's debut studio album Hood Baby, released in 2018. The album initially contained 35 tracks, which was announced back in August 2019. However, it was cut down from its original 35-song track-list to 18 songs.

== Singles ==
On April 10, 2020, "Bricks in the Attic" was released as the lead single from the album. "Never Legit" was released, accompanied with a music video, a week later as the second single, before the release of the album.

== Track listing ==
Credits adapted from Tidal.

Hood Baby 2 track listing
No.	Title	Writer(s)	Producer(s)	Length
1.	"Bricks in the Attic"	Semaja Render; DeVonte Cromartie; Edward Tillman II	DMC Global; Kiecarson	3:01
2.	"Off-White" (featuring Lil Keed)	Render; Nathaniel Band; Nikita Koenig; Raqhid Render	10Fifty; Nikita3x	3:38
3.	"Drip Day N Night" (featuring Gunna and Lil Keed)	Render; Band; Anton Mendo; R. Render; Sergio Kitchens	10Fifty; Star Boy	3:16
4.	"Never Legit"	Render		2:57
5.	"Yeah Yeah" (featuring Future and Lil Keed)	Render; Cromartie; David Morse; Nayvadius Wilburn; R. Render	DMC Global; Morse	4:21
6.	"Crazy Thoughts"	Render; Arda Turel; Lars Belin	ATP; Belin	3:04
7.	"Toe Tag" (featuring SG Kendall and Lil Yachty)	Render; Band; Zachary Foster; Aaron Gilfenbain; Kendall Fisher; Miles McCollum	10Fifty; Foster; Hurtboy AG	4:50
8.	"No Kizzy"	Render; Yurchenko Oleksandr; Maurice Volmer	YoungProducersMafia; MelodicDesert	2:44
9.	"Dream" (featuring Guap Tarantino)	Render; Darius Hill; Chauncey Davis	D. Hill	3:16
10.	"Hood Talk"	Render; Ahmar Bailey; Marcus Bennet	Kid Hazel; DJ Marc B	2:39
11.	"Karate Kid" (featuring Uno Freaky)	Render; Luis Marte; Jonas Gumdal; Fredriquez Chaney	Dvtchie; Fraxille	3:09
12.	"Just Sayin"	Render; Cromartie; Cedric Leutwyler	DMC Global; Lil Wylo	2:12
13.	"Immortal"	Render; Tyjee Eskridge	Beat Dilla	3:14
14.	"Walkin" (featuring BSlime)	Render; Keith White II; Kenneth Redfield; Shaquon Curvin Riley; Jaborious Grier	KayJay Beatz; Kenny Stuntin; Q-Haze Beats	3:09
15.	"Cartier Glass"	Render; Jared McCray	CakeBoy Bally	2:57
16.	"Trap or Die (Jeezy Anthem)"	Render; Eskridge	Beat Dilla	3:30
17.	"Noho" (featuring RG Jaydog)	Render; Jonah Abraham; Jeremiah Paul	Abraham	3:23
18.	"Bootron"	Render; Lane McKenzie; Rok Curokvic	Kay9ine; RokOnTheTrack	3:27
Total length:				58:47

== Charts ==
Chart performance for Hood Baby 2
Chart (2020)	Peak position
US Billboard 200	200
US Heatseekers Albums (Billboard)	2
