= Trapped on Cleveland 3 =

Studio album by Lil Keed
- Released: August 7, 2020
- Recorded: Home studio
- Length: 58:01; 113:20 (Deluxe edition)
- Label: YSL; 300
- Producer: Lil Keed (exec.); Geoff Ogunlesi (also exec.); Young Thug (also exec.); Aarne; Ambezza; Bloublood; DY; Deskhop; Earl on the Beat; Felipe S; Ferno; Holy; JetsonMade; John Lam; June James; Mosaic; Pilgrim; Senor Slice; Skipass; Supah Mario; T-Minus; Twysted Genius; Wheezy; YoungBoyBrown; Yung Lan

Lil Keed chronology
| Long Live Mexico (2019) | Trapped on Cleveland 3 (2020) | Keed Talk To 'Em 2 (2023) |

Singles from Trapped on Cleveland 3
- 1. "Fox 5" Released: June 12, 2020; 2. "She Know" Released: August 3, 2020; 3. "Show Me What You Got" Released: October 16, 2020

Trapped on Cleveland 3 is the second studio album by American rapper Lil Keed. It was released on August 7, 2020, by YSL Records and 300 Entertainment. It is the third and final installment of the Trapped on Cleveland mixtape series, but this is an album. The album features guest appearances from Young Thug, Gunna, Lil Baby, Travis Scott, Ty Dolla Sign, 42 Dugg, and Future. The deluxe edition was released on October 30, 2020. It features additional guest appearances from Lil Gotit, O.T. Genasis, Quavo, Yak Gotti, Lil Duke, and Chris Brown. This would be the last album released in Lil Keed's lifetime, as he died on May 13, 2022.

== Background ==
Trapped on Cleveland 3 is the first of the series in which it was released as an album on streaming platforms. Keed commented on his growth throughout the years by stating,

"Back then, I was talking about stuff like typical rappers: shooting, killing, just saying shit because that's what everybody wanted to hear. Now that I done grew from all that and I done moved myself out of that situation, I'm just letting folks know why I was so trapped on Cleveland, as far as me going to the hood everyday and all the shootouts."

== Singles ==
The album's lead and only single, "Fox 5" featuring American rapper and fellow labelmate Gunna, was released on June 12, 2020. It was accompanied by a music video, the following day. "She Know", featuring American rapper Lil Baby, was released on August 3, 2020, as a promotional single. "Show Me What You Got", featuring American rapper O.T. Genasis, was released on October 16, 2020, as the lead and only single for the deluxe edition.

== Track listing ==
Credits adapted from BMI, Tidal, and Geoff Ogunlesi's Instagram.

Trapped on Cleveland 3 track listing
| No. | Title | Writer(s) | Producer(s) | Length |
|---|---|---|---|---|
| 1. | "Intro" | Raqhid Render | Supah Mario | 2:24 |
| 2. | "Obama Coupe" | R. Render; Tyler Williams | T-Minus | 3:43 |
| 3. | "Trippin" | R. Render; T. Williams | T-Minus | 2:19 |
| 4. | "Tighten Up" | R. Render; Isaiah Blouir; John Lam; Dante Guzzi | Bloublood; Lam; Ferno | 3:59 |
| 5. | "Kiss Em Peace" (featuring Young Thug) | R. Render; Jeffery Williams | YoungBoyBrown; Pilgrim; Ambezza | 2:34 |
| 6. | "Fox 5" (featuring Gunna) | R. Render; Sergio Kitchens | Supah Mario | 3:48 |
| 7. | "Cold World" | R. Render; Kulachkov Evich; Mircea Papusoi; Hagan Lange | Skipass; Aarne; Hagan^{[b]} | 2:52 |
| 8. | "She Know" (featuring Lil Baby) | R. Render; Dominique Jones; Dwan Avery | DY; DJ Moon^{[b]} | 3:13 |
| 9. | "Wavy (Remix)" (featuring Travis Scott) | R. Render; Jacques Webster II; Isaac Bynum | Earl on the Beat | 4:00 |
| 10. | "Traplanta" | R. Render; Tahj Morgan; Ian Wells | JetsonMade; Deskhop^{[a]} | 2:46 |
| 11. | "Don't Stop" (featuring Ty Dolla Sign) | R. Render; Tyrone Griffin, Jr.; Blouir | Bloublood | 2:50 |
| 12. | "Hibachi" (featuring Young Thug) | R. Render; J. Williams; Wesley Glass | Wheezy | 1:56 |
| 13. | "Repaid" | R. Render; Evich | Skipass; Baggo^{[b]} | 3:17 |
| 14. | "Heartbreaker" | R. Render; James Russell | Senor Slice | 2:37 |
| 15. | "Twisted" (featuring 42 Dugg) | R. Render; Dion Hayes; Milan Modi; Deundraeus Portis; Andres Espana; Malita Rice | Twysted Genuis; Felipe S; Yung Lan | 2:40 |
| 16. | "Grandparents" | R. Render; Blouir; Jordan Fulton | Bloublood; Holy | 3:45 |
| 17. | "Zaza" (featuring Future) | R. Render; Nayvadius Wilburn; Glass; Dean Maola | Wheezy; Mosaic | 3:41 |
| 18. | "Why" | R. Render; June James; Chandler Ingram | James; Ghostrage | 1:58 |
| 19. | "Here" | R. Render; Evich; James Maddox; Milan Modi; Rice; Matthew Paisley-Mallia | Skipass; James Maddocks^{[b]} | 3:08 |
| Total length: | | | | 58:01 |

Deluxe edition (bonus tracks)
| No. | Title | Writer(s) | Producer(s) | Length |
|---|---|---|---|---|
| 20. | "Big Order" | R. Render | KJ; Ferno | 4:02 |
| 21. | "Dead Doc" (featuring Lil Gotit) | R. Render; Semaja Render; Samuel Gloade; Adarius Moragne | 30 Roc; DatBoiSqueeze | 3:19 |
| 22. | "Maniac Thoughts" | R. Render | Supah Mario | 3:10 |
| 23. | "Stop It" | R. Render; Tahj Morgan | JetsonMade | 2:45 |
| 24. | "Show Me What You Got" (featuring O.T. Genasis) | R. Render; Odis Flores; Jeremias Daniel | Jimmy Torrio | 3:34 |
| 25. | "Wanna See You" (featuring Young Thug) | R. Render; J. Williams; Blouir; Fulton; Francisco de Vasconcelos Baptista | Bloublood; Holy; FrankieOnTheGuitar | 4:06 |
| 26. | "Currency Chaser" | R. Render | Fallwood; Goose; Kie Carson | 3:01 |
| 27. | "Emotional" (featuring Quavo) | R. Render; Quavious Marshall; Eric Sandoval | Sonic | 3:17 |
| 28. | "Backboard" (featuring Gunna) | R. Render; Kitchens; Chandler Durham; Kenneth Redfield | Turbo; Kenny Stuntin | 3:28 |
| 29. | "Bangin N Hangin" | R. Render; Blouir; Lam | Bloublood; Lam | 1:51 |
| 30. | "Go Brazy" (featuring Yak Gotti) | R. Render; Deamonte Kendrick; Glass | Wheezy | 2:32 |
| 31. | "Yank It" | R. Render | YoungBoyBrown; Vikas Prasad | 3:01 |
| 32. | "Noticed" (featuring Lil Duke and Yak Gotti) | R. Render; Arnold Martinez; Kendrick; Sandoval; Wasa | Sonic; Wasa | 3:20 |
| 33. | "Worst or Better" | R. Render; Nuri | Nuri | 2:34 |
| 34. | "Nasty" (featuring Chris Brown) | R. Render; Christopher Brown; Blouir; Gxra | Bloublood; Gxra | 3:14 |
| 35. | "Off Rip" (featuring Lil Gotit) | R. Render; S. Render; Jasper Harris; Evich; Bak | Skipass; Harris; Bak | 3:18 |
| 36. | "Cuttin" | R. Render | Lil Justin; JulianG | 3:03 |
| 37. | "Thug Luv" | R. Render | | 1:44 |
| Total length: | | | | 1:53:20 |

Notes

- ^{^[a]} signifies a co-producer
- ^{^[b]} signifies an uncredited co-producer

== Personnel ==
Credits adapted from Tidal and Geoff Ogunlesi's Instagram.

Performers

- Lil Keed – primary artist (all tracks)
- Young Thug – featured artist (tracks 5, 12, 25)
- Gunna – featured artist (tracks 6, 28)
- Lil Baby – featured artist (track 8)
- Travis Scott – featured artist (track 9)
- Ty Dolla Sign – featured artist (track 11)
- 42 Dugg – featured artist (track 15)
- Future – featured artist (track 17)
- Lil Gotit – featured artist (tracks 21, 35)
- O.T. Genasis – featured artist (track 24)
- Quavo – featured artist (track 27)
- Yak Gotti – featured artist (tracks 30, 32)
- Lil Duke – featured artist (track 32)
- Chris Brown – featured artist (track 34)

Technical

- Senor Slice – recording (tracks 1–3, 6, 11, 13, 14, 18, 19)
- Anthony "Dub" Williams – recording (tracks 2–5, 7-10, 15-17)
- Angad "Bainz" Bains – recording (tracks 5, 12), mixing (tracks 1–5, 7–12, 15–17)
- Florian "Flo" Ongonga – recording (track 6)
- James "Murk Tha Engineer" Butler- recording

(track 15)

- Rafael "Fai" Bautista – recording (track 11), mixing (track 11)
- Bryan Anzel – recording (track 17)
- Eric Manco – recording (track 17)
- Aresh Banaji – mixing (track 1–3, 5), mixing assistant (tracks 6, 13, 14, 18, 19)
- Alex Tumay – mixing (tracks 6, 13, 14, 18, 19)
- Mike Dean – co-mixing (track 9)
- Drew Sliger – mixing assistant (track 2)
- Jenso "JP" Plymouth – mixing assistant (tracks 2 3)
- Nathan Miller – mixing assistant (tracks 6, 13, 14, 18, 19)
- Christal Jerez – mixing assistant (tracks 6, 13, 14, 18, 19)
- Travis "ViKo" Blake – mixing assistant (track 10)
- Joe LaPorta – mastering (all tracks)

== Charts ==
Chart performance for Trapped on Cleveland 3
| Chart (2020) | Peak position |
|---|---|
| US Billboard 200 | 41 |
