= Long Live Mexico =

Studio album by Lil Keed
- Released: June 14, 2019
- Recorded: 2019
- Genres: Hip hop; trap
- Length: 66:36
- Labels: YSL; 300
- Producers: Lil Keed (exec.); Geoff Ogunlesi (also exec.); 1Mind; Badmon56k; BeldonDidThat; Cubeatz; Cvre; DJ Ayo; Earl on the Beat; Goose; JetsonMade; Jimmy Torrio; JTK; Keyyz; King Ozzy; Lord Capp; Metro Boomin; OG Mic Will; OJ Finessey; Otxhello; Pi'erre Bourne; Producer 20; Pyrex; Rok; Starboy; Senor Slice; Turbo; YoungBoyBrown

Lil Keed chronology
Keed Talk to 'Em (2018)	Long Live Mexico (2019)	Trapped on Cleveland 3 (2020)

Singles from Long Live Mexico
- 1. "Oh My God" Released: April 25, 2019; 2. "Proud of Me" Released: May 4, 2019; 3. "Pull Up" Released: May 29, 2019

Professional ratings
Review scores
Source	Rating
AllMusic	3.5/5 stars
HipHopDX	3.5/5 stars
Pitchfork	7.3/10

Long Live Mexico is the debut studio album by American rapper Lil Keed. It was released on June 14, 2019, by YSL Records and 300 Entertainment. The album features guest appearances from Lil Duke, Gunna, Nav, Young Thug, Guap Tarantino, MSA PG, Moneybagg Yo, Keed's younger brother Lil Gotit, Lil Uzi Vert, YNW Melly, StickBaby, Roddy Ricch, and Karlae. It sold 16,000 in first week sales, with only 300 pure album sales.

== Background ==
The album is his second project after Keed Talk To 'Em, which was released earlier in December 2018.

The project was named "Long Live Mexico" to commemorate and pay homage to Keed's friend Mexico, who lost his life earlier in the year.

== Singles ==
The album contains the singles, "Oh My God", "Proud Of Me", and "Pull Up."

== Accolades ==
Publication	Accolade	Rank	Ref.
Noisey	Top 100 Albums of 2019	100	
Passion of the Weiss	Top 50 Albums of 2019	30	

== Track listing ==
Credits adapted from Geoff Ogunlesi's Instagram.

No.	Title	Writer(s)	Producer(s)	Length
1.	"Ride the Wave"	Raqhid Render; Othello Houston; Jonathan Silva	Otxhello; Badmon56k	2:44
2.	"Oh My God"	R. Render; Tahj Morgan; Gavin Valencia	JetsonMade; OJ Finessey	3:06
3.	"Anybody" (featuring Lil Duke and Gunna)	R. Render; Arnold Martinez; Sergio Kitchens; Jordan Knight; Jahmere Tylon; OG Mic Will	JTK; DJ Ayo; OG Mic Will	4:16
4.	"Rockstar" (featuring Nav)	R. Render; Navraj Goraya; Rok Curkovic; Anton Mendo	Rok; Starboy	2:54
5.	"Million Dollar Mansion" (featuring Young Thug)	R. Render; Jeffery Williams; Jordan Jenks	Pi'erre Bourne	3:09
6.	"HBS"	Render; Curkovic	Rok	2:00
7.	"Tip Top" (featuring Guap Tarantino and MSA PG)	R. Render; Chauncey Davis; Eric Moore; Chandler Durham; Keshawn Gilmore	Turbo; Keyyz	3:28
8.	"Child" (featuring Moneybagg Yo)	R. Render; Demario White, Jr.; James Russell	Senor Slice	2:36
9.	"Snake"	R. Render; Kedrick Cannady; Kevin Gomringer; Tim Gomringer	Pyrex; Cubeatz	3:03
10.	"Pass It Out" (featuring Lil Gotit)	R. Render; Semaja Render; Leland Wayne	Metro Boomin	3:37
11.	"Pull Up" (featuring Lil Uzi Vert and YNW Melly)	R. Render; Symere Woods; Jamell Demons; Morgan; Antwain Fox	JetsonMade; Producer 20	2:42
12.	"Real Hood Baby" (featuring StickBaby)	R. Render; StickBaby; Lohitvishnu Thanaskodi	YoungBoyBrown	3:29
13.	"Fear of God"	R. Render; Darnell Carr, Jr.; Jun Ha Kim	Lord Capp; Cvre	3:21
14.	"Make U Proud"	R. Render; Scott Dambrot	Goose	3:13
15.	"On Everything"	R. Render; Curkovic	Rok	3:14
16.	"Dragon" (featuring Roddy Ricch)	R. Render; Rodrick Moore, Jr.; Issac Bynum; Mac Sutphin; Sebastian Lopez; Micheal Lohmeier	Earl on the Beat; 1Mind	3:31
17.	"Higher N Higher" (featuring Karlae)	R. Render; Jerrika Karlae; BeldonDidThat; King Ozzy	BeldonDidThat; King Ozzy	3:10
18.	"Ride Wit You"	R. Render	Jimmy Torrio	3:22
19.	"Just a Dream"	R. Render; BeldonDidThat	BeldonDidThat	3:13
20.	"Proud of Me" (featuring Young Thug)	R. Render; Williams; Dambrot; Jess Glynne; Loland Jones	Goose	3:28
Total length:				1:06:36

Notes

- ^{^[a]} signifies an uncredited co-producer

== Personnel ==
Credits adapted from Geoff Ogunlesi's Instagram.

- A.L.E.O. – recording (tracks 1, 6, 12)
- Anthony "Dub" Williams – recording (tracks 2–4, 7, 9, 11, 13, 15–19)
- A. Bainz – recording (tracks 5, 20)
- Senor Slice – recording (tracks 8, 10)
- Ray Nash – recording (track 14)
- Alex Tumay – mixing (all tracks)
- Joe LaPorta – mastering (all tracks)

== Charts ==
Chart (2019)	Peak position
US Billboard 200	26
US Top R&B/Hip-Hop Albums (Billboard)	11
US Top Rap Albums (Billboard)	10
