= Otis (song) =

Single by Jay-Z and Kanye West featuring Otis Redding

from the album Watch the Throne
- Released: July 20, 2011
- Recorded: November 2010
- Genre: Hip-hop; progressive rap
- Length: 2:58
- Label: Roc-A-Fella; Roc Nation; Def Jam
- Songwriters: Kanye West; Shawn Carter; Otis Redding; James Brown; Jimmy Campbell; Reg Connelly; Roy Hammond; Joseph Roach; Kirk Robinson; Harry Woods; Vincent Biessy
- Producer: Kanye West

Jay-Z singles chronology
"H.A.M." (2011)	"Otis" (2011)	"Lift Off" (2011)

Kanye West singles chronology
"Marvin & Chardonnay" (2011)	"Otis" (2011)	"Lift Off" (2011)

Music video
- "Otis" on YouTube

"Otis" is a song by American rappers Jay-Z and Kanye West from their collaborative studio album, Watch the Throne (2011). The song samples late soul singer Otis Redding's version of "Try a Little Tenderness". The production was covered solely by West. Redding is credited as a featured artist and the namesake of the song on streaming platforms due to his work being sampled. The track was premiered by Funkmaster Flex's Hot 97 radio show and was released onto the Internet the day afterward. Lyrically, the song has the two rappers sharing lines discussing wealth, decadence and fame. The track received widespread critical acclaim from music critics who lauded the trading off of verses by the two rappers and the Redding-sampled beat, which was compared to the style heard on West's The College Dropout. Several publications placed the song amongst the best of the year.

The track was released as the second single from Watch the Throne on July 20, 2011. The song peaked at number 12 on the US Billboard Hot 100 and reached position 2 on both the Billboard Hot Rap Songs and Hot R&B/Hip-Hop Songs charts. The song has since been certified 3× platinum for sales exceeding 3,000,000. The song received a music video directed by Spike Jonze in August 2011. The video primarily shows West and Jay-Z modifying a Maybach luxury car and then driving around in it with no doors or windows. After its release, the video was met with positive reception. The cover art was designed by Italian fashion designer Riccardo Tisci.

Jay and West performed the song at all the stops on their 2011 Watch the Throne Tour. It was also performed at the 2011 MTV Video Music Awards and at the 2012 Radio 1's Big Weekend musical festival. At the 54th Grammy Awards in 2012, "Otis" was nominated for a Grammy Award for Best Rap Song and won a Grammy for Best Rap Performance.

== Background and release ==
On July 7, 2011, "Otis" was previewed along with the other songs from Watch the Throne by Jay-Z at a private listening session at the Mercer Hotel in New York City. A select group of reporters, music journalists, and contest winners were present at the listening session. After the listening session, it was confirmed that a song called "Otis", would appear on the album. It was reported that the song would sample soul music singer Otis Redding's version of "Try a Little Tenderness". On July 20, "Otis" was premiered on Funkmaster Flex's Hot 97 radio show. It took 22 minutes to get through as Flex restarted the song 25 times, or roughly every 53 seconds. Flex said, as he promoted the song:

New York City, you listen to me! If you’re near a convenience store right now—any type of 24-hour store—go into the store right now and put your hand in the cash register for no reason! Their money is your money as of right now!

The track was subsequently released for download to the Internet as a way to promote the upcoming album. On July 22, the song was released to the iTunes Store and was a free download for those who pre-ordered the album. It was sent by The Island Def Jam Music Group to rhythmic contemporary and urban contemporary radio on August 9. The cover art for "Otis" was designed by Italian fashion designer Riccardo Tisci, who had previously designed the artwork for the "H•A•M" single cover and the Watch the Throne album cover. It features the American flag, both artist's names and the name of the song and the album. The artwork was released onto the internet following the song's release and could be downloaded along with the song.

Bu Thiam, Def Jam vice-president of A&R, was with West and Jay-Z throughout the recording process and saw how the duo came up with several of the Watch the Throne tracks. He recalled the story of the song "Otis": "[Kanye] was late for his flight, we were in the studio working all day and he was late for his flight. As we were leaving he was like, 'Yo hold on for a second.' So he drops his bags and goes to the MPC (beat machine) and his assistant is rushing him and he's just f----ing with [the beat]. What's so crazy is the whole time he's doing that Jay is writing his verses in his head. But Jay is watching the NBA playoffs, I think it was the championship; Miami Heat & Dallas Mavericks. So Jay is watching the playoffs. I'm not even thinking Jay is paying attention to what 'Ye is doing and by the time he is finished it's like 'I invented swag ...' And I'm like, 'What the f--- just happened?'"

== Composition ==
"Otis"
A 17 second sample of "Otis" which features Jay-Z and Kanye West's trading verses over the riff of the sample.

"Otis" is two minutes and fifty-eight seconds long and is a mid-tempo hip-hop song. The song, which was produced by West, is built upon a sample of "Try a Little Tenderness" by Otis Redding. Jay-Z and West rap over the sample in a style reminiscent of past Kanye productions. Pitchfork's Tom Breihan summarized the composition, writing:

... here's Jay-Z on the "Otis" intro: "It sounds so soulful! Don't you agree?" Well, yeah. If you're willing to plunk down enough money to sample "Try a Little Tenderness", that'll happen. But even if the sample works as a sort of audio money-flaunt, it's also a tough and hard chop from Kanye—Otis Redding's magnificent voice mostly limited to a couple of hellfire grunts, the song itself held to a sharp guitar stab."

Alexis Petridis of The Guardian stated:

The single Otis boldly samples Otis Redding's "Try a Little Tenderness", an idea that veers wildly from inspired – at one point the ballad is manipulated into a propulsive sweaty grunt-a-thon – to a clubfooted mess.

The song ends with sampled screaming.

To celebrate the fifth anniversary of the song, Roc Nation executive Lenny Santiago took to Instagram to share how Kanye created the beat within 20 minutes. Lenny recalls:

Five years ago today, the song "Otis" was released. It's one of my favorite songs, tracks and Lyrics from the classic album, Watch The Throne by Jay Z & Kanye West. This record stands out to me cause I vividly remember the day of its inception. We were in the Mercer Hotel, NYC, where a lot of the album was made. The day or rather session for that day was coming to an end. Kanye had to catch a flight if I'm not mistaken. We were almost towards the end of the album and he was telling everyone in the room that as soon as he returns, he wanted to fuck with this Otis Redding sample idea he had. As he was being reminded that he had to leave to catch his flight, he sort of brushed that off and was like, fuck it, let me just play y'all a piece of the song so you could see how dope it is. He then approached the MPC and Keyboard and played it. Everyone in the room does the ugly face like when you hear some dope shit or see the sickest slam dunk at a contest. Lol. He then begins to chop the sample lil by lil (But fast) and actually starts creating the track. Ye being one of my favorite producers, I'm literally hype as Fuck and in awe. I begin to snap the Canon cam like an Uzi. Lol. This is 1 of the pictures captured here of course. 15 or 20min later before he runs off to catch his flight, he creates the phenomenal track known to us as "OTIS".

== Critical reception ==
The song was met with widespread critical acclaim from critics with the style being compared to that of West's The College Dropout album. Pitchfork Media's Tom Breiham praised the song, saying "Jay and Kanye trade off verses and never pause for a chorus, each one building on whatever the last one said-- an old-school rap-collab style you almost never hear anymore. And since these guys are working loose and casual, it gives them chances to show how funny and clever they are without telegraphing their own importance. Simon Vozick-Levinson of Rolling Stone gave the song a four star rating out of five and wrote that "West twists a few seconds of Otis Redding's "Try a Little Tenderness" into a Blueprint-style barrage, setting the stage for some slick collar-popping from Jay-Z ("Photo shoot fresh, looking like wealth / I'm about to call the paparazzi on myself"). Jay's performance, in turn, inspires Ye to step up his wordplay ("Luxury rap, the Hermès of verses / Sophisticated ignorance, write my curses in cursive"); the younger star sounds like he pulled an all-nighter trying to outdo his mentor's rhymes." Frank Berg of NME gave the song a mostly positive review, stating that "What we have here are two titans of black music duetting with another from beyond the grave. For that reason, it's unquestionably An Event", though feeling "In all honesty, if this winds up being the highlight of Watch the Throne we'll all be a bit disappointed."

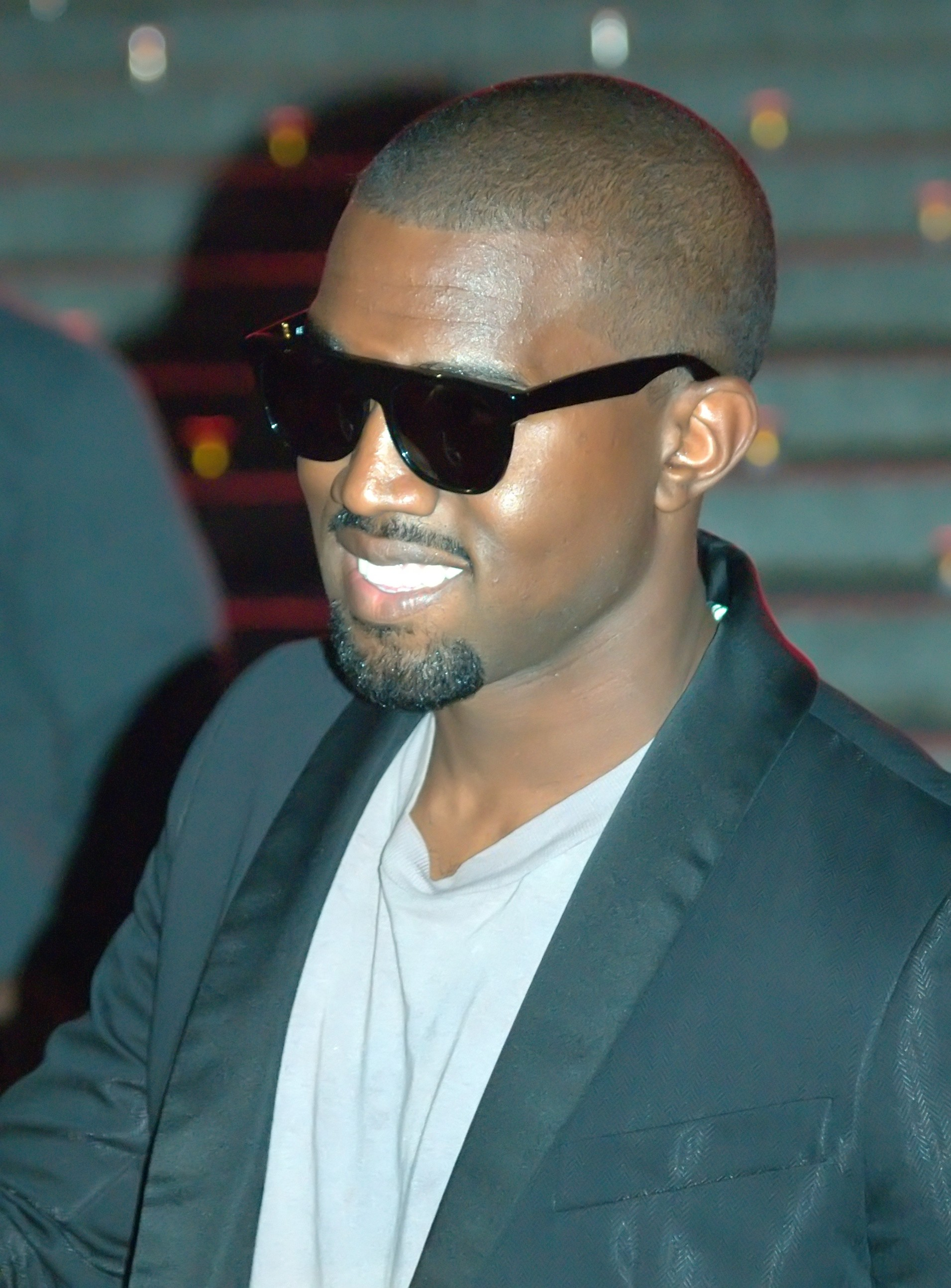
The production style of "Otis" has been compared to West's The College Dropout.

Seattle Weekly's Joe Williams enjoyed the song, writing "even with the slow, bubbling beat and energetic keyboards, topped with top-notch delivery by Jay and Kay, it's Redding in the background that gives the single its true life and flair." Josiah Hughes of Exclaim! magazine commented that "if the over-the-top aggression of "H•A•M" had you worried that this would be a Waka Flocka ripoff, fear not, as "Otis" makes the most of its Otis Redding sample with some soulful feel-good boom-bap." Sam Gould The Independent remarked "having seen oddball rap collective Odd Future become the talking point of the blogosphere, Eminem and old partner-in-crime Royce da 5'9" start work on their own bruising collaborative effort, and hazy vibe rappers Wiz Khalifa and Curren$y take steps in the same direction, Jay and Ye have recognized the throne is far from unchallenged, and have come together in the most remarkable dual alliance since André 3000 and Big Boi became Outkast." The New York Observer writer Foster Kamer mused, "remember early Kanye? These guys finally do. 'Otis' is the perfect anti-single for this album, because it's a reminder that what we always loved about these two collaborating is still very much there. Not only do they not need hooks, neither of them need to remind us that they don't. There was that first line of My Beautiful Dark Twisted Fantasy, 'I fantasized 'bout this back in Chicago,' and then, the relief after it, where you didn't have to worry about the rest of that album", and Billboard claimed, "Otis gets better with each play".

However, Chicago Tribune writer Greg Kot was less enthusiastic about the track, musing that "the references to luxury cars and private jets quickly lose their escapist luster, grossly out of step with a summer in which joblessness and foreclosure are becoming all too common for many Americans" and that "just as disappointing is that the Redding sample – a thrilling burst of agitated vocals, classic Memphis horns, organ and drums – never goes anywhere." In an interview with Redding's widow, Zelma Redding, Us Weekly reported that Mrs. Redding approved the song, saying "We are proud that Otis' legacy continues to inspire some of today's popular artists. We like 'Otis' and thank Kanye and Jay-Z for honoring our Otis through their music."

Pitchfork Media named the song the 42nd best song of 2011. XXL named the song the fifth best of the year, and Spin named the song the 17th. Time's Claire Suddath placed the song at number four on her best of the year list, writing "the lead single off Watch the Throne mixes and loops Otis Redding's passionate shouts and screams from "Try a Little Tenderness," paying homage to his soulful style while mixing it up by adding heavy beats and chopping up the original track's piano tune." Complex named the song the 100th best Jay-Z song of all time. HotNewHipHop named "Otis" one of the 15 greatest sample flips in hip-hop history.

== Remixes ==
Papoose remixed the song and performed a freestyle over it. Papoose released a music video of his version of the song. Old School rappers Kool Moe Dee and Grandmaster Caz released a version of the song titled "N-Otis". Rappers Tinie Tempah, Chipmunk, Wretch 32, and Jadakiss with Styles P of The LOX also released a remix and freestyle. Rapper The Game used some of this song's content to record a diss track named "Uncle Otis", referring to Otis Redding's vocal sample on the track. He insulted Jay-Z and Kanye West along with musicians Big Sean, Kreayshawn amongst others. The Game however has gone on record, saying that "It's poking jokes and taking shots, but that's what I do" and that song wasn't serious in nature. Writing about the song, Pop Crush commented that "an obvious attempt to get some promotion for his upcoming disc, The R.E.D. Album. Later Game used the "Otis" instrumental for a twenty-minute freestyle entitled "Daytona 500 (500 Bars)." Cassidy did his. Rappers DMX and Busta Rhymes also made a collaborative "Otis" remix. Singer Ne-Yo also recorded a freestyle rap over "Otis" for a mixtape. Teen singer Justin Bieber also rapped a written verse over the track during a live radio show. YG and Reem Riches collaborated on their version of the song along with a music video. Angel Haze and Iggy Azalea also remixed the track for a live show. In 2019, YBN Cordae freestyled over the instrumental during his Funkmaster Flex freestyle on Hot 97.

== Music video ==
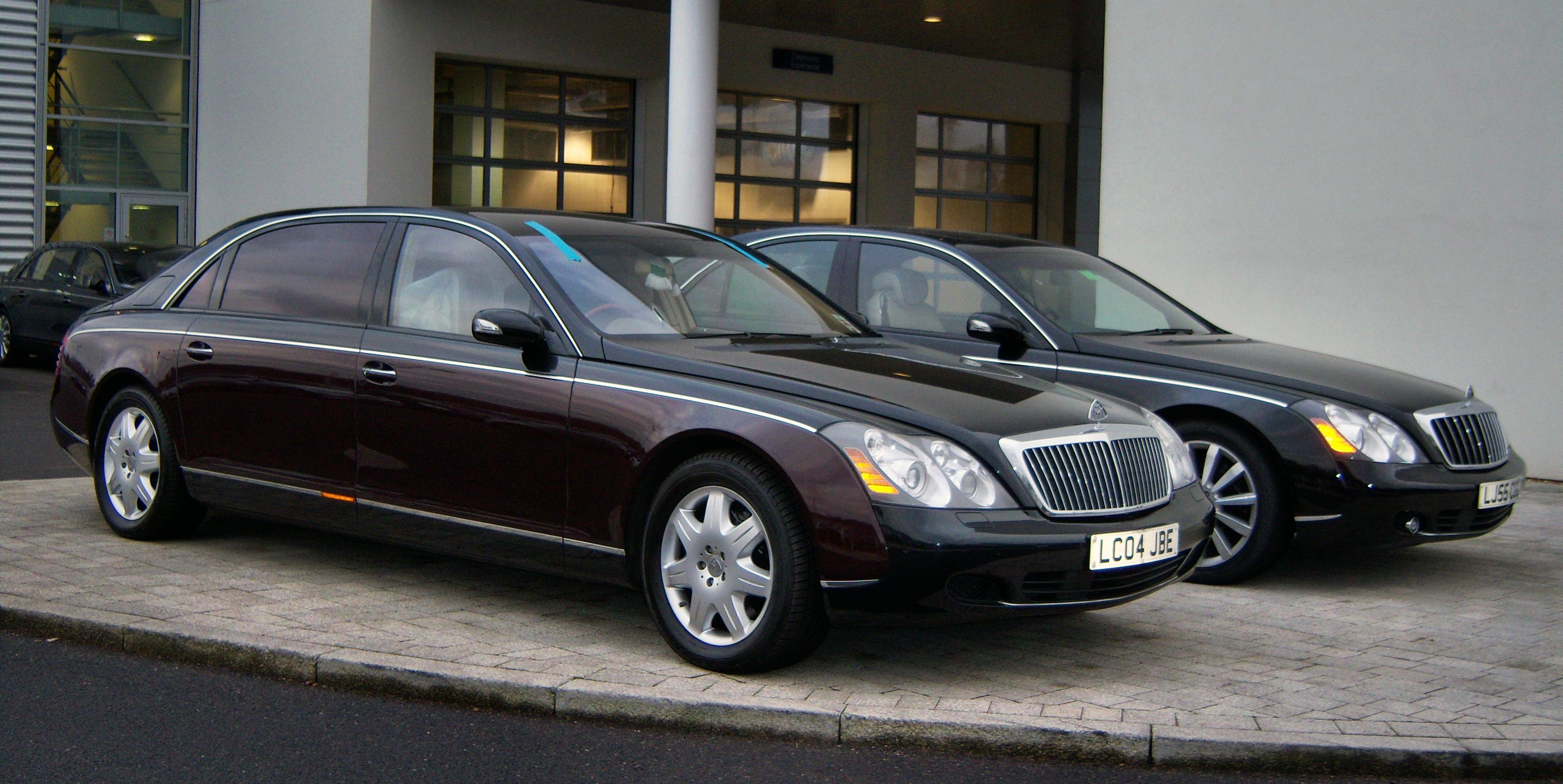
The video features a Maybach 57 customized by West and Jay.

The music video was directed by Spike Jonze and was filmed in Downey, California, USA. Pitchfork Media reported that "Jay-Z and Kanye West are doing something big for the video for Otis." The video, featuring a cameo by Aziz Ansari, was released on August 11, 2011, on MTV and affiliated networks at 8:56 pm ET/PT with an encore showing at 11:00 pm ET/PT on MTV2. The video was uploaded on the music video site VEVO on the same day.

The video primarily shows West and Jay-Z destroying and then customizing a Maybach 57 and then racing around an industrial lot in it (with no doors or windows), while four models smile and laugh from the backseat. The "dynamic duo take a saber saw to a glistening new Maybach and turn it into a tricked-out 'Thunderdome' cruiser, then do doughnuts in a parking lot with a gaggle of models packed in the back." The video "eschews the narrative spazzouts and stoner-boggling tricks of previous Jonze videos" preferring instead to "luxuriate in the icon status of its two principals. We get fireworks, fist bumps, a fast car, and general larger-than-life camaraderie rather than, say, guys on fire running in slow-motion. It's like The Expendables, if that movie only starred two guys, and both of them were rappers who didn't do any onscreen fighting." The car was put up for auction, and the proceeds were donated toward the East African Drought Disaster. The car sold for $60,000 at auction, despite its $350,000 retail price and $100,000–$150,000 evaluation before the auction.

The music video won Video of the Year at the 2012 BET Awards. Pitchfork Media named the video amongst the best of the year. In 2019, Billboard named the video as the fourth best music video of the 2010s.

The music video was also referenced by Young Thug and Future in their music video for the single Money on Money for Thug's 2025 studio album UY Scuti, With both rappers driving a similarly modified Lamborghini Urus, Kanye praised the video during a livestream, Saying that it made him "almost miss the Watch The Throne days", referring to his current feud with Jay Z.

== Live performances ==
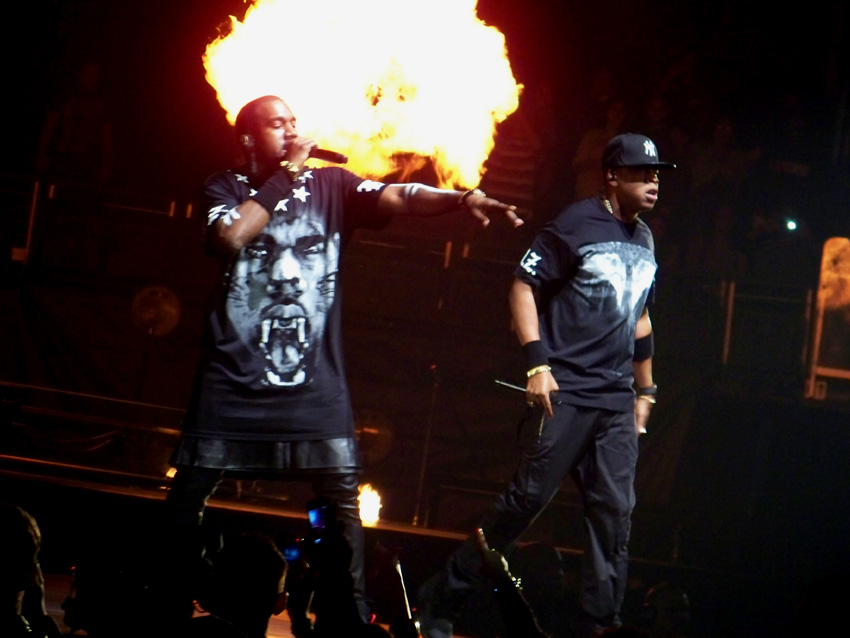
West and Jay-Z performed "Otis" at their Watch the Throne tour.

On August 28, 2011, Jay-Z and Kanye West performed the song for the first time at the 2011 MTV Video Music Awards. The two rappers marched down the runway with "flames erupting in the background." The song was performed at all stops of their 2011–12 Watch the Throne Tour, generally as one of the opening tracks. It was performed "with a Givenchy-designed American flag flashing on the stage's main screen." During Jay-Z's setlist at the 2012 Radio 1's Big Weekend festival, West joined Jay-Z to perform "Otis" and other Watch the Throne hits like "Niggas in Paris" and "No Church in the Wild".

== Accolades ==
"Otis" appeared at #33 on the 2011 Triple J Hottest 100.

Awards
Year	Ceremony	Category	Result	Ref.
2011	Antville Music Video Awards	Most Fun Video	Nominated	
2011	Antville Music Video Awards	Best Performance Video	Nominated	
2011	Antville Music Video Awards	Best Hip-Hop Video	Nominated	
2011	Soul Train Music Awards	Hip-Hop Song of the Year	Nominated	
2012	ASCAP Rhythm & Soul Music Awards	Award Winning R&B/Hip-Hop Songs	Won	
2012	BET Awards	Best Collaboration	Nominated	
2012	BET Awards	Viewer's Choice	Nominated	
2012	BET Awards	Video of the Year	Won	
2012	BET Hip Hop Awards	People's Champ Award	Nominated	
2012	Grammy Awards	Best Rap Song	Nominated	
2012	Grammy Awards	Best Rap Performance	Won	
2012	MP3 Music Awards	Best Hip Hop/R&B/Rap	Nominated	
2012	MTV Video Music Awards	Best Direction	Nominated	
2012	MTV Video Music Awards Japan	Best Hip-Hop Video	Nominated	
2012	MTV Video Music Awards Japan	Best Collaboration	Nominated	
2012	iHeartRadio MMVAs	Most Streamed Video of the Year	Nominated	
2012	Music Video Production Awards	Best Hip-Hop Video	Won	
2012	UK Music Video Awards	Best Urban Video – International	Won	

== Chart performance ==
"Otis" debuted at position 47 on the Billboard Hot 100 on the week ending August 6, 2011, after a partial week of sales and airplay in which it sold 44,000 digital copies and received an audience of 22 million impressions on all radio formats. The following week, "Otis" jumped into the Hot Digital Songs top 10 at number 9, selling 113,000 copies, and reached number 12 on the Hot 100. The song also debuted at 15 on Billboard's R&B/Hip-Hop Songs and 13 on Billboard's Hot Rap Songs. Following the same week, the song debuted at number 89 on the Canadian Hot 100 and rose to number 37 the next week. In the UK, the song debuted at 67 on the Singles Chart, and 26 on the R&B Chart.

== Credits and personnel ==
- Produced by Kanye West
- Recorded by Noah Goldstein
- Mixed by Anthony Kilhoffer
- Mixed and recorded at The Mercer Hotel

== Charts ==
=== Weekly charts ===
Chart (2011–13)	Peak position
Australia (ARIA)	42
Austria (Ö3 Austria Top 40)	73
Belgium (Ultratip Bubbling Under Flanders)	5
Belgium (Ultratip Bubbling Under Wallonia)	15
Canada Hot 100 (Billboard)	37
France (SNEP)	69
Ireland (IRMA)	41
Japan (Japan Hot 100)	29
Netherlands (Single Top 100)	73
South Korea (Gaon Chart)	33
Scottish Singles Sales (Official Charts)	28
Switzerland (Schweizer Hitparade)	61
UK Singles (Official Charts)	28
UK R&B (Official Charts Company)	10
US Billboard Hot 100	12
US Hot R&B/Hip-Hop Songs (Billboard)	2
US Hot Rap Songs (Billboard)	2

=== Year-end charts ===
Chart (2011)	Position
UK Singles (Official Charts Company)	176
US Hot R&B/Hip-Hop Songs (Billboard)	32

== Certifications ==
Region	Certification	Certified units/sales
Australia (ARIA)	Gold	35,000^{^}
Canada (Music Canada)	Gold	40,000^{*}
Denmark (IFPI Danmark)	Gold	45,000^{‡}
New Zealand (RMNZ)	Platinum	30,000^{‡}
United Kingdom (BPI)	Platinum	600,000^{‡}
United States (RIAA)	4× Platinum	4,000,000^{‡}
^{*} Sales figures based on certification alone.^{^} Shipments figures based on certification alone.^{‡} Sales+streaming figures based on certification alone.
