= Einer Bankz =

American ukulele player and record producer

Einer Bankz is an American record producer, YouTuber, ukulele player from San Francisco, California. He is known for his viral videos with rappers where he plays the ukulele as the artists rap a cappella. He has created acoustic content for hi-hop acts such as Chance the Rapper, Lil Wayne, King Von, YG, Roddy Ricch, Jhene Aiko, Kodak Black, Ski Mask the Slump God, Blueface, Trippie Redd, Swae Lee, Machine Gun Kelly, Polo G, YNW Melly, The Kid LAROI, Lil Durk, Sexyy Red, and CJ, among others.

== Career ==
Einer started his career after Snoop Dogg reposted one of his videos, causing his first ukulele cover version to go viral.

A turning point is his career is when he began traveling and creating content with artists outside of his home region in Northern California. After creating videos with Icewear Vezzo in Detroit and Fat Joe in Atlanta in 2018, Bankz was recognized at the national level, and getting a coveted ukulele video with him became a rite of passage for up and coming rappers.

His production credits include tracks for artists such as 21 Savage, Quando Rondo, Travis Scott and Dave East. He also produced Louisiana artist Fredo Bang's hit single "Oouuh".

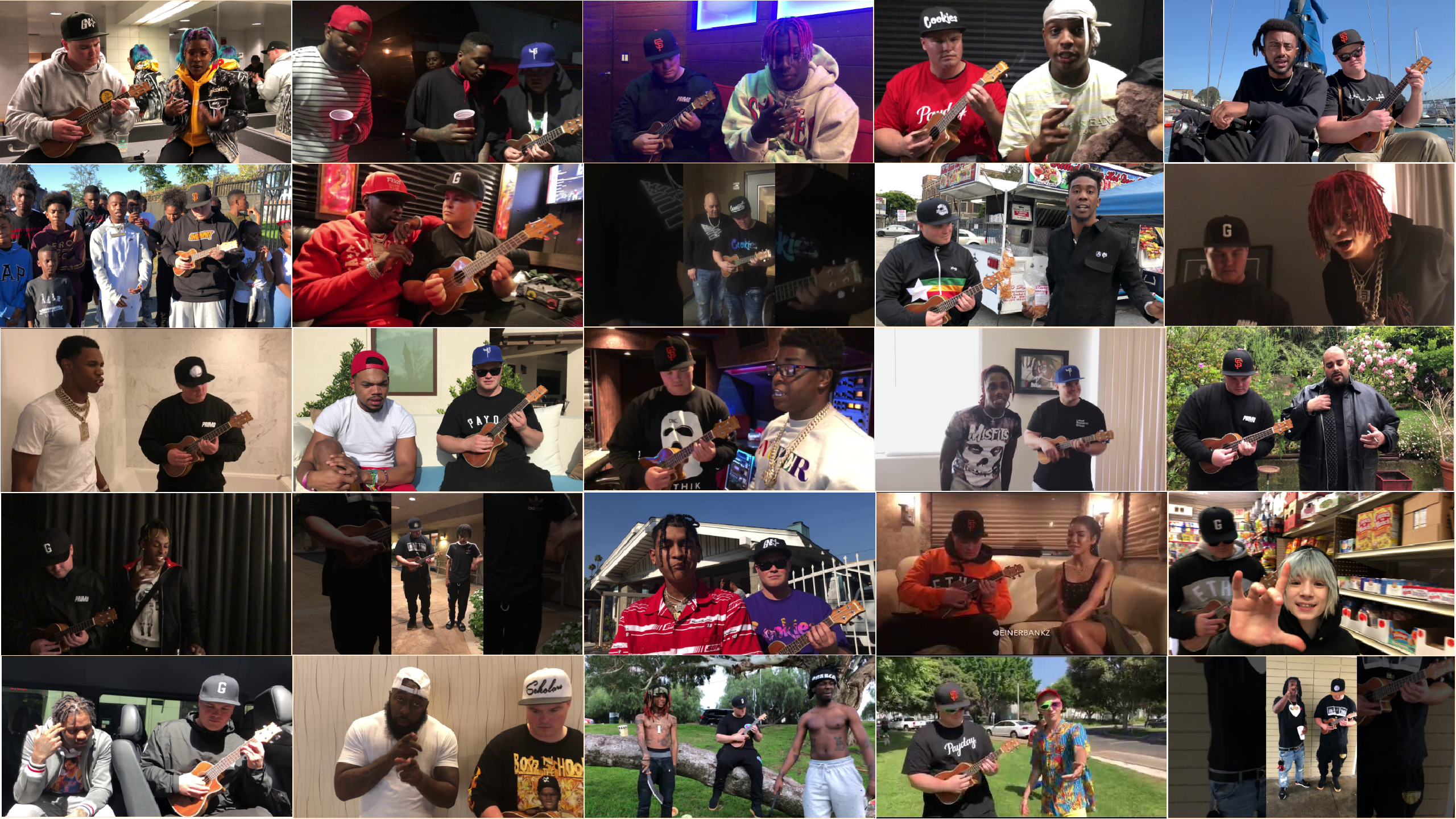
Einer Bankz ukulele collaborates with various artists.

In early 2018, Mass Appeal released a short documentary about Einer and where he plans to take his movement. The short also featured Lil Durk. Shortly thereafter, Bankz produced a song for Durk's album Love Songs 4 the Streets 2.

In August 2018, the New York Times featured his video with Florida rapper Project Youngin in their weekly playlist writeup.

In 2019, Bankz was nominated for a Grammy for his production on 21 Savage's album I Am > I Was.

Einer maintains a global presence, and has worked with artists from the United Kingdom, Italy, India, Canada, Puerto Rico, and Nigeria.

He co-produced Polo G's chart-topping "RAPSTAR" which earned him his first number 1 Billboard production credit. Shortly after Einer was featured on the Jimmy Fallon Show alongside Polo G performing RAPSTAR.

== Production credits ==
2021

- "Rapstar" (Polo G) (produced with Synco)
- "No Where" (YoungBoy Never Broke Again) (produced with DMAC and Cheese)
- "Gifted" (No Savage) (produced with JetsonMade)
- "Bestfriends" (42 Dugg) (produced with DMAC)

2022

- "Save The Day" (NoCap featuring Kodak Black) (produced with Jambo and Harto Beats)
- "No Love" (Fredo Bang featuring Sleepy Hallow) (produced with Sambeats and Iceberg Beatz)
- "In My Head" (24kGoldn) (produced with Travis Barker)

2023

- "Off Land" (Lil Keed featuring Lil Jairmy) (produced with Foster)
- "Sloppy Na" (Fredo Bang)

2025

- "Limitless" (Central Cee
