= Crazy But It's True =

Studio album by Lil Gotit
- Released: March 13, 2019
- Recorded: 2019
- Genre: Hip-hop; trap
- Length: 54:14
- Label: Alamo
- Producer: 10Fifty; Bankroll Got It; Cakeboy Bally; Clooney Certified; Cubeatz; Dez Wright; Dun Deal; ForeignGotEm; JetsonMade; Mike Mixer; Pyrex; Quay Global; Richie Souf; Roselilah; Supah Mario; VanRiper; Western Reiss; Wheezy

Lil Gotit chronology
Hood Baby (2018)	Crazy But It's True (2019)	The Real Goat (2019)

Singles from Crazy But It's True
- 1. "Da Real HoodBabies" Released: February 26, 2019

Crazy But It's True is the second studio album by American rapper Lil Gotit. It was released on March 13, 2019, by Alamo Records.

== Background ==
The album includes eighteen songs in total and features collaborators such as Gunna, Gotit's older brother Lil Keed, Lil Durk, Hoodrich Pablo Juan, Yung Mal, and Money Man. On the production side, Dun Deal, Supah Mario, 10Fifty, and Atlanta go-to Wheezy provided the bass beats for album's distinct approach. The album is his second studio album after Hood Baby, which was released earlier in November 2018. According to Lil Gotit, the album was named for his upbringing since Hood Baby and new rapping style.

== Singles ==
"Da Real HoodBabies" was released as the lead single from the album, with a music video released in February 2019 on YouTube. The song was later remixed by rapper Lil Baby.

== Track listing ==
Credits adapted from Tidal, BMI and ASCAP.

No.	Title	Writer(s)	Producer(s)	Length
1.	"Meet Lil Gotit"	Semaja Render; Nathaniel Band	10Fifty	1:29
2.	"Hood Gunna" (featuring Gunna)	Render; Michael McWhite; Sergio Kitchens	Mike Mixer; DJ Pressure	2:22
3.	"Now"	Render; Kendrick Cannady; Roshwita Bacha	Pyrex; Roselilah	3:25
4.	"Drop The Top" (featuring Lil Keed)	Render; Tahj Morgan; Jonathan Priester; Raqhid Render	JetsonMade; Supah Mario	2:48
5.	"Drip School" (featuring Lil Durk)	Render; Wesley Glass; Durk Banks	Wheezy; Cubeatz	3:36
6.	"Da Real HoodBabies"	Render; Joel Banks; Matthew Banks; Taylor Banks	Bankroll Got It	2:51
7.	"Off White" (featuring Hoodrich Pablo Juan)	Render; Chris Rosser; Sterling Pennix	Quay Global	3:12
8.	"Water"	Render; David Cunningham; Christopher Green	Dun Deal; Chriz Beatz; Westen Weiss; Van Riper	2:53
9.	"OverT" (featuring Lil Co and Yung Mal)	Render; Jared McCray; Jamal Braud	Cakeboy Bally	3:18
10.	"Instead"	Render; Band; Pedrom Hosseini	10Fifty; Clooney Certified	2:44
11.	"Pyrex Kid" (featuring Marlo)	Render; Tony Son; Rudolph Johnson	Richie Souf	3:15
12.	"Surf"	Render; Priester; Chauncey Davis	Supah Mario	2:36
13.	"Running Bands" (featuring Lil Keed)	Render; Priester; Dylan Cleary-Krell; R. Render	Supah Mario; Dez Wright	3:13
14.	"Road Rage" (featuring Guap Tarantino)	Render; Devonte Cromartie	DMC Global	3:16
15.	"Worth It"	Render; Band	10Fifty; ForeignGotEm	2:48
16.	"The Baby" (featuring Slimelife Shawty)	Render; Cunningham; Wunnie Lee	Dun Deal	2:49
17.	"We Da Gang" (featuring BSlime and Stickbaby)	Render; McWhite; Brandon Garland	Mike Mixer	3:32
18.	"Paid N Full"	Render; Band	10Fifty	4:07
Total length:				54:14
