= Money on Money =

2025 single by Young Thug featuring Future

Single by Young Thug featuring Future

from the album UY Scuti
- Released: April 25, 2025
- Genre: Hip-hop; trap
- Length: 3:57
- Label: YSL; 300
- Songwriters: Jeffery Williams; Nayvadius Wilburn; Wesley Glass; Joshua Luellen; Dylan Cleary-Krell; Lucas DePante; Jason Rosenberg; Jaden Christodoulou
- Producers: Wheezy; Southside; Dez Wright; Juke Wong; Rosen Beatz; 9Jay

Young Thug singles chronology
"Lightyears" (2024)	"Money on Money" (2025)	"Miss My Dogs" (2025)

Future singles chronology
"Fxck Up the World" (2025)	"Money on Money" (2025)	"One of Them" (2026)

Music Video
- "Money on Money" on YouTube

"Money on Money" is a song by American rapper Young Thug featuring fellow American rapper Future. It was released through YSL Records and 300 Entertainment on April 25, 2025, as the lead single from Thug's fourth studio album, UY Scuti (2025). The two artists wrote the song with producers Wheezy, Southside, Dez Wright, Juke Wong, Rosen Beatz, and 9Jay.

Upon its release, the song was received positively by music critics, who praised the beat switch and Future's guest appearance. Commercially, the song charted at number 39 on the Billboard Hot 100 and peaked within the top 10 on component charts in the United States and New Zealand.

== Composition ==
"Money on Money" is an Atlanta trap song, boasting prominent hi-hats and synth lines. Its beat switch has been described as "dark" in comparison to the "glossier" tone of its first half. The song allegedly references Gunna, referencing his snitching allegations due to his role in the YSL RICO case, with lines like "Never associate with a rat / Go and get some money, get a pack."

== Music video ==
A music video directed by Kaito and Brendan O’Connor was released alongside the track. The video begins with a burning Young Stoner Life rug, before Thug and Future racing around a shipping yard in a modified Lamborghini Urus. The video has been compared to Jay-Z and Kanye West's music video for "Otis". West himself would later praise the music video during a livestream, saying "it almost made me miss the [Watch The Throne] days"; he was still feuding with Jay-Z at the time.

== Critical reception ==
"Money on Money" received generally positive reviews from critics. Writing for Stereogum, Tom Breihan wrote that although there's "nothing really new about 'Money On Money,'" the song is effective in its genre. Breihan complimented the songs "effective: beat switch, as well as citing Future's performance as "exhilarating". Jon Blistein of Rolling Stone stated that the song was a "stomping return" for Thug, as it was his first solo release since his trial.

== Commercial performance ==
Upon its release, the single charted at number 39 on the Billboard Hot 100 and peaked at number 10 on the Hot R&B/Hip-Hop Songs chart in the United States. The single also charted at number 71 on the Billboard Global 200, number 61 on the Canadian Hot 100, number 58 on the Greece International chart, and number 3 on the Official Aotearoa Music Charts.

== Credits and personnel ==
Credits adapted from Tidal.

=== Musicians ===
- Young Thug – vocals, songwriting
- Future – vocals, songwriting
- Joshua Luellen – producer, songwriting
- Wesley Glass – producer, songwriting
- Jason Rosenberg – producer, songwriting
- Dylan Cleary-Krell – producer, songwriting
- Jaden Christodoulou – producer, songwriting

=== Technical ===
- Joe LaPorta – mastering engineer
- A. "Bainz" Bains – recording engineer, mixing engineer
- Eric Manco – recording engineer
- Miguel "Wav Surgeon" Correa – recording engineer
- Aresh Banaji – assistant mixing engineer
- Drew Sliger – assistant mixing engineer
- Dylan Spence – assistant recording engineer
- Garfield Larmond – assistant recording engineer

== Charts ==
=== Weekly charts ===
Weekly chart performance for "Money on Money"
Chart (2025)	Peak position
Canada Hot 100 (Billboard)	62
Global 200 (Billboard)	71
Greece International (IFPI)	58
New Zealand Hot Singles (RMNZ)	3
US Billboard Hot 100	39
US Hot R&B/Hip-Hop Songs (Billboard)	10

=== Year-end charts ===
Year-end chart performance for "Money on Money"
Chart (2025)	Position
US Hot R&B/Hip-Hop Songs (Billboard)	90
