= Rapstar =

2021 single by Polo G

Single by Polo G

from the album Hall of Fame
- Released: April 9, 2021
- Genre: Trap
- Length: 2:45
- Label: Columbia
- Songwriters: Taurus Bartlett; Einer Bankz; Alexander Wu
- Producers: Einer Bankz; Synco

Polo G singles chronology
"Richer" (2021)	"Rapstar" (2021)	"Beat Box 5" / "Wit Dat" (2021)

Music video
- "Rapstar" on YouTube

"Rapstar" is a song by American rapper Polo G. It was released through Columbia Records as the third single from his third studio album, Hall of Fame, on April 9, 2021. The song was produced by Synco, with social media star Einer Bankz performing the ukulele. On the song, Polo G harmonizes about his growing stardom, the downside of fame and the rewards of it. The single was well received by critics and became Polo G's first and only number one hit on the US Billboard Hot 100.

== Background and composition ==
"Rapstar" was first previewed nearly a year before its release, on May 25, 2020, in a YouTube video where Polo G and the song's co-producer Einer Bankz performs an acoustic version of the song, with Bankz playing his signature ukulele. The song was officially announced just two days before its release, with Polo posting a teaser of the music video to his socials.

The song features a "plucky" arpeggio string loop over the guitar-driven ukulele-based trap beat. Lyrically, it sees Polo delving through the ups and downs of his fame, as he raps "Every day a battle, I'm exhausted and I'm weary". In between those dark reflections, he boasts about his career success, his sexual prowess, his "impressive" features on songs, the wealth, and the women he is involved with. He also heavily alludes to his time growing up in the North side of Chicago. The first verse seemingly addresses his battle with anxiety and drug use, as he refers to his use of "pills", and how he feels sad, "when alone, my eyes teary". The second verse shows him more "heated", as he talks about putting his streets first and about "homicides". Adam Schofield of Pie Radio summarized: "We see there are two very different sides to Taurus; a sad anxiety stricken lonely young man, and a violent gangster – it makes you wonder how rapping about guns and sadness works so well together!".

== Critical reception ==
Billboard's Jason Lipshutz named it among the week's essential releases, stating: "Polo G remains one of the strongest storytellers in modern hip-hop, and even when his money-counting can't provide a sense of peace, the results are often captivating for his listeners". Stereogum's Chris DeVille said the song "is like a super hi-res version of Polo G's signature sound", while opining that it "continues Polo G's tradition of sounding vaguely triumphant even as he unpacks his depression and trauma. It's a strange combination, but he pulls it off". Similarly, Alex Zidel of HotNewHipHop said Polo is "back to the same style we know and love him for", adding that he "continues his prolific run with the release of 'Rapstar'", with Zidel deeming it a highlight from Polo's recently released material. Uproxx's Wongo Okon shared the sentiment, stating that "The Chicago native has released countless songs that have proven his stay in the rap game will be far from temporary. The rapper continues his run with his latest single, 'Rapstar'". Adam Schofield of Pie Radio said "Bankz impressively playing the ukulele mixed with Polo G's angelic voice may just be our new favourite thing!". HipHopDX's Devon Jefferson called the song a "flex-heavy banger", as "Polo G raps through a barrage of relentless punchlines and a flossy hook". Andrew Sacher of BrooklynVegan opined that the song finds Polo G "exploring his melodic side to great effect". XXL named it among the best new music of the week.

== Awards and nominations ==
Award	Year	Category	Result	Ref.
Brit Awards	2022	International Song of the Year	Nominated	
MTV Video Music Awards	2021	Best Hip-hop	Nominated	

== Commercial performance ==
On its first day of release, the song reached number one on both US Apple Music and Spotify, opening at the latter with 2.7 million streams, marking Polo G's first number-one on Spotify and a career peak in daily song streams.

The song debuted at number one on the US Billboard Hot 100 on the chart dated April 24, 2021, with over 6,300 sales, and 77.7 million streams. The song became Polo G's first US number-one single and second top 10.

== Music video ==
The music video was released alongside the song and was directed by Arrad. The visual shows Polo G putting his life as a rap star on display; he goes through seven different settings, showing off the rewards and lavish lifestyle that come with fame. It begins with Einer Bankz playing his ukulele, whereafter Polo is seen at a BMW dealership buying high-end luxury coupes for all his friends with a big bag of cash. He records music, and is inducted into a fictitious Hip hop Hall of Fame. He also shows love for his hometown, Chicago, playing basketball in a Chicago Bulls outfit. He is later seen lying on the ground after being stabbed in the back by his lover. In the video, Polo sports a look that pays homage to 2Pac, which reflects the song's lyrics in which Polo declares himself Pac's reincarnation. The video stars Polo G's son Tremani, as the two are seen bonding through father and son time. Rappers DDG, Trench Baby, Scorey and Baby Rich also make cameos.

=== Reception ===
Complex's FNR Tigg noted how in the video, Polo G "takes the trials and tribulations [...] and the downside of living his glamorous life". Tigg said he effectively utilizes the Notorious B.I.G.'s infamous "more money, more problems" tagline. Lyrical Lemonade said positively, "Not many artists possess the type of talent that Polo does, especially for his age, he's mastered his sound and always matches his great music with even better music videos that elevate the tracks." As of December 2025 the video has over 260 Million views on youtube

== Charts ==
=== Weekly charts ===
Weekly chart performance for "Rapstar"
Chart (2021)	Peak position
Australia (ARIA)	4
Austria (Ö3 Austria Top 40)	14
Belgium (Ultratop 50 Flanders)	50
Canada Hot 100 (Billboard)	1
Czech Republic Singles Digital (ČNS IFPI)	56
Denmark (Tracklisten)	3
Finland (Suomen virallinen lista)	11
Germany (GfK)	29
Global 200 (Billboard)	3
Greece International (IFPI)	4
Hungary (Stream Top 40)	15
Iceland (Tónlistinn)	16
Ireland (IRMA)	2
Lithuania (AGATA)	12
Netherlands (Single Top 100)	23
New Zealand (Recorded Music NZ)	2
Norway (VG-lista)	4
Portugal (AFP)	18
Slovakia Singles Digital (ČNS IFPI)	30
Sweden (Sverigetopplistan)	5
Switzerland (Schweizer Hitparade)	14
UK Singles (Official Charts)	3
UK Hip Hop/R&B (Official Charts)	1
US Billboard Hot 100	1
US Hot R&B/Hip-Hop Songs (Billboard)	1
US Pop Airplay (Billboard)	29
US Rhythmic Airplay (Billboard)	1
US Rolling Stone Top 100	1

=== Year-end charts ===
Year-end chart performance for "Rapstar"
Chart (2021)	Position
Australia (ARIA)	41
Canada (Canadian Hot 100)	29
Denmark (Tracklisten)	73
Global 200 (Billboard)	47
Hungary (Stream Top 40)	96
Iceland (Tónlistinn)	36
Ireland (IRMA)	44
Portugal (AFP)	104
Sweden (Sverigetopplistan)	82
Switzerland (Schweizer Hitparade)	89
UK Singles (OCC)	52
US Billboard Hot 100	30
US Hot R&B/Hip-Hop Songs (Billboard)	7
US Rhythmic (Billboard)	15

== Certifications ==
Certifications for "Rapstar"
Region	Certification	Certified units/sales
Australia (ARIA)	2× Platinum	140,000^{‡}
Belgium (BRMA)	Gold	20,000^{‡}
Canada (Music Canada)	6× Platinum	480,000^{‡}
Denmark (IFPI Danmark)	Platinum	90,000^{‡}
New Zealand (RMNZ)	2× Platinum	60,000^{‡}
Poland (ZPAV)	Gold	25,000^{‡}
Portugal (AFP)	Gold	5,000^{‡}
Switzerland (IFPI Switzerland)	Gold	10,000^{‡}
United Kingdom (BPI)	Platinum	600,000^{‡}
United States (RIAA)	8× Platinum	8,000,000^{‡}
Streaming
Greece (IFPI Greece)	Gold	1,000,000^{†}
Sweden (GLF)	Platinum	8,000,000^{†}
^{‡} Sales+streaming figures based on certification alone.^{†} Streaming-only figures based on certification alone.

== Release history ==
Release dates and formats for "Rapstar"
Region	Date	Format(s)	Label	Ref.
Various	April 9, 2021	Digital download; streaming	Columbia	
United States	April 20, 2021	Rhythmic contemporary radio	Columbia	
United States	April 20, 2021	Urban contemporary radio	Columbia	

== See also ==
- List of Billboard Hot 100 number ones of 2021
