= Miss My Dogs =

2025 single by Young Thug

Single by Young Thug

from the album UY Scuti
- Released: September 12, 2025
- Genre: Trap
- Length: 7:02
- Label: YSL; 300; Atlantic
- Songwriters: Jeffery Williams; London Holmes; Jacob Scalver; Nicholas Arter; John Elby
- Producers: London on da Track; Juko

Young Thug singles chronology
| "Money on Money" (2025) | "Miss My Dogs" (2025) |

Music video
- "Miss My Dogs" on YouTube

"Miss My Dogs" is a song by American rapper Young Thug from his fourth studio album, UY Scuti (2025). It was released as the album's second single on September 12, 2025, through YSL Records, 300 Entertainment, and Atlantic Records. The song was written by Thug alongside Nicholas Arter, John Elby, and its producers London on da Track and Juko. Lyrically, it features Young Thug apologizing to his friends in the music industry, whom he insulted through several leaked phone calls from prison, and his family.

Upon its release, "Miss My Dogs" received positive reviews from music critics, who praised Thug's vulnerability and sincerity on the song.

== Background ==
Young Thug was arrested in May 2022 on racketeering charges as part of a RICO case investigating YSL Records. He was released from prison after accepting a plea deal in October 2024, and has since been criticizing rapper Gunna for supposedly turning informant due to him taking a plea deal. On August 27, 2025, an audio recording of Young Thug being interrogated by police about the 2015 shooting of Lil Wayne's tour bus surfaced online. Some interpreted him as cooperating with the authorities, leading to "snitching" allegations against Thug himself. Soon after, dozens of phone calls that Young Thug made during his incarceration began leaking online for the next two weeks, which recorded him disparaging many figures in the hip-hop industry. Young Thug subsequently apologized on social media to rapper GloRilla for insulting her appearance and singer Mariah the Scientist, his then-girlfriend, for cheating on her, which he had admitted only a few days before his arrest. On September 12, Young Thug released the song, on which he issued apologies to several more people whom he had dissed. He also shared the lyrics to the song on Instagram.

== Composition and lyrics ==
The song begins with Young Thug crooning over piano chords and strings, using reverbed vocals, before the instrumental transitions into a trap beat that samples his vocals from the intro. In the lyrics, he apologizes to Mariah the Scientist for being unfaithful to her, as well as rappers Drake, Lil Baby, Future, 21 Savage and Gucci Mane for speaking ill of them. Thug dedicates a verse to each of them, as he discusses how he values their personal relationships, appreciating their support for him while he was incarcerated, and takes accountability for his mistakes.

In the first verse, Young Thug addresses the calls in which he suggested he had cheated on Mariah the Scientist and begs her to forgive him, hoping to regain her approval. He outlines his fears of losing her, their intimate moments and her remaining loyal to him. Young Thug claims he was "playing" in his calls and would never trade her. He further admits to largely contributing to her troubles, such as joining in with the "hoes laughing at you", taking her from another relationship where she may have been treated better, and having encouraged the people "bashing" her, in addition to being indirectly responsible for her arrest in 2024. In the second verse, he is grateful to Drake for visiting him in jail and describes his efforts to end Drake's feud with Future and Metro Boomin, revealing he had called the latter to persuade him.

The third verse finds Young Thug reinforcing his relationship with Lil Baby, pleading for him to return his phone calls and not to let the "rats" divide them, alluding to Gunna. He praises Baby for his loyalty, pointing out that he paid over $75,000 in legal fees for several co-defendants in the YSL RICO case. Young Thug expresses admiration for Future in the fourth verse, reflecting on the evolution of their relationship and Future's pivotal role in shaping his career—including believing in him when they made their collaborative mixtape Super Slimey. Thug also pays homage to rapper Young Scooter, a close friend of Future who died in March 2025, and empathizes with Future's grief, before detailing that they treat each other's families as their own. In the fifth verse, Young Thug seeks to reconcile with 21 Savage, thanking him for showing loyalty by staying in touch with him during his imprisonment. Thug reflects on Savage resolving his conflict with Lil Baby at Thug's request, comparing it to Savage helping him end his feud with rapper YFN Lucci. He parallels these disputes with that of Drake and Future, admitting that although his efforts in peacemaking may fail, they are motivated by selfless intentions.

The sixth verse sees Young Thug respecting Gucci Mane and referencing his past feud with rapper Jeezy while asking for forgiveness in regard to his plea deal, insisting he is not a "rat". The seventh and final verse is dedicated to his family. Young Thug highlights his father's devotion to the family, namely loving his stepchildren as his own, and mentions sharing his first million dollars with them out of love. Thug apologizes for the mistakes which have created challenges for them, addressing his parents in the closing lines: "Made some mistakes, now the game tryna ban me / They don't want your child no more, now they tryna Plan B me".

The song's intro and outro samples an AI generated soul song.

== Critical reception ==
Armon Sadler of Vibe wrote "This is perhaps the most vulnerable Thugger has ever gotten, and for those who are fans of 'We Should' and 'We Ball,' they know that he is at his best when he is pouring his heart out over a beat as opposed to the standard rap flexes. It had been hard to be excited for Uy Scuti these last few months, but 'Man I Miss My Dogs' is a reminder of how exceptional Thug can be when he expresses himself through songs instead of tweets." Caleb Catlin of Vice commented: "Sure, people can rip this apart for chatty purposes. But the reason this works is that Young Thug bears himself emotionally. Over somber, throbbing production, he shelves his vocal dexterity and lavish gallivanting for the raw and honest. When Thug sings with the vocal sample, his voice cracks under his wheezy crooning." Deaundre Dixon of Earmilk stated "Ultimately, while it is refreshing to hear Thug so full of passion and vulnerability, the context is hard to ignore. The leaked calls, Thug's incessant desire to throw shade, and the constant reminders of interpersonal philanthropy, leave some of the sentiments feeling hollow at best, and manipulative and self-deprecating at worst. The feelings may be genuine, but in the setting of the song, there's a certain sense of real sincerity that seems to be lacking at times."

HotNewHipHop ranked the song as the 15th best rap song of 2025.

== Music video ==
The music video was released alongside the single. It sees Young Thug rapping the song and includes home videos of his family.
