= Nameless (song) =

Single by Lil Keed

Single by Lil Keed

from the album Keed Talk to 'Em
- Released: December 11, 2018
- Length: 3:05
- Label: YSL; 300
- Songwriters: Raqhid Render; Devante Wilkes
- Producer: Goose

Lil Keed singles chronology
"Balenciaga" (2018)	"Nameless" (2018)	"Blood Diamonds" (2019)

Music video
- "Nameless" on YouTube

"Nameless" is a song by American rapper Lil Keed, released on December 11, 2018 along with a music video. It is the second single from his fourth mixtape Keed Talk to 'Em (2018). It was produced by Goose.

== Composition ==
Alphonse Pierre of Pitchfork described the song as a "lovestruck ballad made to be screenshotted and posted on every high schooler's IG story". Over a "dreamy" beat, Lil Keed sings about his relationship.

== Critical reception ==
Alex Zidel of HotNewHipHop considered the song as one of the best from Keed Talk to 'Em. He added, "Keed's melodic work is stellar on 'Nameless' as his staccato flows will be stuck in your head after a few listens."

== Charts ==
Chart (2019)	Peak position
Mainstream R&B/Hip-Hop Airplay (Billboard)	23

== Certifications ==
Region	Certification	Certified units/sales
United States (RIAA)	Gold	500,000^{‡}
^{‡} Sales+streaming figures based on certification alone.
