= Hood Baby =

Studio album by Lil Gotit
- Released: November 16, 2018
- Recorded: 2018
- Genre: Hip hop; trap
- Length: 52:43
- Label: Alamo
- Producer: 10Fifty; Andrew Ayaz; Blueyy; Chronic Cloud; Clooney Certified; Cosa Nostra Beats; Deedotwill; Dun Deal; GuerillaMusic; Jay Beatz; Kilo Keyz; Pyrex; TrellGotWings; Yung Lan; XODB

Lil Gotit chronology
Hood Baby (2018)	Crazy But It's True (2019)

Singles from Hood Baby
- 1. "Drip Severe" Released: November 15, 2018

Hood Baby is the debut studio album by American rapper Lil Gotit. It was released on November 16, 2018, by Alamo Records.

== Background ==
It features 18 songs and collaborators including Gunna, Lil Duke, Lil Keed, Mal & Quill, Hoodrich Pablo Juan, Guap Tarantino and Slimelife Shawty. The album was named after Gotit "being in the hood" and being treated "like a little bro". Described as a "minor-key and trap-styled production" Gotit was said to have "remained lyrically subdued, his insight suggests a noted sense of authenticity, derived from a lifestyle many listeners will never understand."

== Singles ==
"Drip Severe" was released as the lead single from the album, along with "Blue Slimes", with the latter being a non-album single.

== Track listing ==
Credits adapted from Tidal.

No.	Title	Writer(s)	Producer(s)	Length
1.	"Christmas"	Semaja Render; Nathaniel Band; Andrew Ayaz	10Fifty; Ayaz	3:14
2.	"Superstar" (featuring Gunna)	S. Render; Band; Sergio Kitchens	10Fifty	2:40
3.	"Loco"	S. Render; Keondrea Williams	Deedotwill	2:55
4.	"Gucci High Socks"	S. Render; Milan Modi	Yung Lan	2:34
5.	"Hell Yeah" (featuring Lil Keed)	S. Render; Marcus Ford; Raqhid Render	XODB	2:24
6.	"Hard Right Thare"	S. Render; Kendrick Cannady	Pyrex	3:42
7.	"Toe To Toe"	S. Render; Modi; Brain Anamayatana; Trelle Hudson	Yung Lan; Kilo Keyz; TrellGotWings	2:54
8.	"Racks" (featuring Guap Tarantino & Mal & Quill)	S. Render; Band; Chauncey Davis; Jamal Braud; Dequillius Boyer	10Fifty	3:10
9.	"Big Bertha"	S. Render; Cannady	Pyrex	2:11
10.	"On Me" (featuring Hoodrich Pablo Juan)	S. Render; Mac Atkinson; Justin Guitierrez; Sterling Pennix	GuerillaMusic; Jay Beatz	2:27
11.	"Celebration"	S. Render; Atkinson; Gutierrez	GuerillaMusic; Jay Beatz	2:58
12.	"Let's Go" (featuring Guap Tarantino)	S. Render; Davis; Marvin Banks; Tyrese Pierre; David Cunningham	Dun Deal; Cosa Nostra Beats; Chronic Cloud	3:12
13.	"Mismatch" (featuring Lil Duke)	S. Render; Xzavier Allen; Elzie Dukes II	Blueyy	3:35
14.	"Reasons"	S. Render; Ford	XODB	3:02
15.	"Drip Severe"	S. Render; Modi	Yung Lan	3:14
16.	"Armed & Dangerous" (featuring Slimelife Shawty)	S. Render; Williams; Wunnie Lee	Deedotwill	3:26
17.	"Golden One"	S. Render; Band; Pedrom Hosseini	10Fifty; Clooney Certified	3:07
18.	"Cook Up"	S. Render; Cannady	Pyrex	1:58
Total length:				52:43

Notes

- "Let's Go" is alternatively titled "Let's Go!" on some platforms
