= Ninja (Young Thug song) =

2025 song by Young Thug

Song by Young Thug

from the album UY Scuti
- Released: September 26, 2025
- Genre: Trap
- Length: 3:50
- Label: YSL; 300; Atlantic
- Songwriters: Jeffery Williams; Joshua Luellen; Carlton McDowell Jr.; Peyton McDowell
- Producers: Southside; Car!ton; PeytonTheAlien

"Ninja" is a song by American rapper Young Thug, released on September 26, 2025, from his fourth studio album, UY Scuti (2025), through YSL Records, 300 Entertainment, and Atlantic Records. The track was written by Thug himself, alongside the song's producers Southside, Car!ton and PeytonTheAlien. Upon its release, the song sparked controversy for using the racial slur "nigger" with him saying the word 16 times in the song, particularly towards the end of the track.

== Composition ==
The song opens with sampled audio of a prosecutor from the YSL Records racketeering trial condemning Young Thug, talking about how dangerous he is. This is followed by the introduction of an 808-heavy beat, over which Thug boasts about his luxuries in his verses. In the closing lines, he repeatedly uses the word "nigger" to address his enemies.

== Critical reception ==
Alphonse Pierre of Pitchfork gave a negative review of the song, calling it "one of the most shameless rap songs in Thug's catalog". He described the beat's style as one that he "got tired of a half-decade ago" and especially criticized the use of "nigger", writing "That's right, chanting 'nigger'—in a Hank Hill-like accent, I'd like to add. It's so dumb and corny, just bottom-of-the-barrel edgelord trolling."

== Controversy ==
The song caused a public outcry over its use of "nigger". While some interpreted the use of “nigger” as challenging a racial norm without intentions of shock value, most considered the use of “nigger” offensive and/or ridiculous. Hot 97 radio host Ebro Darden was among those who criticized the song, tweeting "With the 'er' .... ya'll letting the yts sing that part?" Much of the backlash was directed at non-Black fans who found it "edgy" or funny online.

The day after the song was released, Young Thug discussed the song’s use of “nigger” on a livestream with online streamer Adin Ross. He offered a simple explanation, saying "I was thinking just, like, you know... I don't know, man. Just, all of my opps are niggers." Ross noted that he himself was not allowed to say that word, to which Thug replied "You can't say that, you supposed to say 'ninja'. You're not supposed to say anything, really. As a white guy, you shouldn't say anything. You know, you should leave that to the Black people. You and the rest of the white community." When Ross asked where he would first perform the song, Thug revealed that he intends to perform it at the ComplexCon. Later in the stream, he expanded on his plans to address the audience before the performance about reciprocating his respect for them, allow only Black people to say "nigger", and warn that he would leave if any white fan said “nigger”.

== Charts ==
Chart performance for "Ninja"
Chart (2025)	Peak position
Canada Hot 100 (Billboard)	96
New Zealand Hot Singles (RMNZ)	14
US Billboard Hot 100	69
US Hot R&B/Hip-Hop Songs (Billboard)	15
