= UY Scuti (Young Thug album) =

Studio album by Young Thug
- Released: September 26, 2025
- Length: 77:34
- Labels: YSL; 300; Atlantic
- Producers: 9Jay; ATL Jacob; BeatzByRRoze; BlueSoundRoom; Brandosound; Car!ton; Dez Wright; DJ Moon; D Rich; Dylan Hyde; FBG Goat; Gabe Lucas; Juke Wong; Juko; Kyuro; London on Da Track; MacShooter; Metro Boomin; Money Musik; PeytonTheAlien; Sinful YTS; Slowburnz; Southside; Taurus; TM88; Wheezy; Wonderyo; XD; Yume

Young Thug chronology
Business Is Business (2023)	UY Scuti (2025)	Slime Language 3 (2026)

Singles from UY Scuti (Note: Ten tracks from the album ("Dreams Rarely Do Come True", "Invest into You", "Pardon My Back", "Pipe Down", "Revenge", "RIP Big & Mack", "Spider or Jeffery", "Walk Down", "Whoopty Doo", and "Yuck") were uploaded separately to Spotify as singles on September 26, 2025, but not to other major streaming services.)
- 1. "Money on Money" Released: April 25, 2025; 2. "Miss My Dogs" Released: September 12, 2025

UY Scuti is the fourth studio album by American rapper and singer Young Thug. It was released through YSL, Atlantic Records, and 300 Entertainment on September 26, 2025. The album features guest appearances from Ken Carson, Cardi B, T.I., Lil Baby, Sexyy Red, YFN Lucci, 21 Savage, Travis Scott, Quavo, Lil Gotit, 1300Saint, Future, and Mariah the Scientist, with the "Supernova Edition" deluxe featuring the late Lil Keed. Notable producers for the album that includes ATL Jacob, London on Da Track, TM88, Wheezy, Southside, and Metro Boomin, among others.

Named after the red supergiant star UY Scuti, the album serves as the follow-up to Thug's album, Business Is Business (2023). It marks his first project since being released from prison on October 31, 2024. The album's lead single, "Money on Money", was released on April 25, and charted at number 39 on the Billboard Hot 100 and peaked at number 3 in New Zealand. The album's second single, "Miss My Dogs", was shown on the social media platform Instagram on September 11 and officially released to streaming services the next day.

Upon its release, the album received generally mixed reviews from critics, with the album cover and intro song "Ninja" being panned, though the deluxe version was well received and debuted at number 6 on the Billboard 200.

== Background ==
On October 31, 2024, Young Thug was released from Fulton County Jail in Atlanta, Georgia, after accepting a non-negotiated plea deal for his charges within the YSL Records racketeering trial, which he had been incarcerated under since May 9, 2022. As part of the agreement, all other charges were dropped in exchange for Thug pleading no contest to one count each of conspiracy to violate the Georgia RICO (Racketeer Influenced and Corrupt Organizations) Act and of leading a criminal street gang, while also pleading guilty to three counts of violating the Controlled Substances Act and one count each of participation in criminal street activity, possession of a machine gun, and possession of a firearm during the commission of a felony. In return, Thug was sentenced to 40 years, but was granted immediate release from custody with the sentence being structured as 5 years commuted to time served, 15 years of probation, and a backloaded sentence of 20 years in prison conditional on violating probation.

On November 3, 2024, Thug made his first public comments since being released from jail, with him expressing his gratitude for the plea deal. On November 10, media personality DJ Akademiks posted a picture that he received of Thug in a recording studio with fellow American rappers Travis Scott, Lil Baby, and Future. On January 19, 2025, American record producer Metro Boomin announced that he was currently working on Thug's next project through a story on Instagram.

== Recording ==
It came easy. I never lost it. Nothing. I never lost it. I listened to music in jail and I listened to music sometimes in court and things like that, so I never lost it. I was still up to par on what was going on for the most part.

— Thug, on if making music feels the same as it felt before he was arrested

On April 25, 2025, Thug appeared in a cover story interview with GQ during which he went into depth about the time he spent incarcerated, the content of the album, its name, and several other topics. In the interview, Thug revealed that since his release from jail in October 2024, he has primarily worked on his album while also revealing that his girlfriend, Mariah the Scientist, is featured on a "raw and confessional" track on the album. When Thug was asked about the creation process of making music, he stated that he never lost his process despite being incarcerated for over a year. Thug was also asked about his creativity in the music industry and where it came from, to which he responded: "I don't know. A lot of my ideas just come from UY Scuti—just come from fucking space". Thug also revealed that he named the album UY Scuti because he feels as though he's one of the biggest stars in the industry:

"I just feel big, you know. The name of my album UY Scuti. I feel like I'm one of the biggest stars. I did a lot. Foundating this culture. The new rap game that's happening right now. I'm out of this world. Not like God, though."

== Release and promotion ==
Thug held up a jersey with the name "UY Scuti" at a Miami Heat vs. Golden State Warriors basketball game on March 25 and followed an account on Instagram that features the name. Future tweeted the name the following day, seemingly confirming his involvement in the album. British-American rapper 21 Savage would be confirmed to make an appearance on the album on April 10 through an Instagram story. Fans then spotted a billboard in the California desert the following day on the way to the Coachella 2025 festival, which read "UNIVERSE HAS BEEN TOO QUIET. UNTIL NOW. UY SCUTI" with the month of May being written in the lower right corner. On April 16, Thug officially announced the release of the album after sharing a link to pre-order it.

The album's lead single, "Money on Money" featuring close collaborator Future, was released on April 25, 2025, and was accompanied by a music video. On the same day, Thug appeared in an interview with GQ and appeared on the cover of their magazine. Fans would later notice Mariah the Scientist commented "I can't wait until May 9 please change the date mr. UY scuti" under an Instagram post promoting the interview, seemingly confirming the release date. The release date was later pushed back to June, although it did not drop that month.

After being pushed back several times, leaked jail calls of Thug were released, causing discontent and disappointment among fans as many labeled Thug a "snitch". Following this, several rappers begun to distance themselves from Thug, leading to the release of the album's second single, "Miss My Dogs" releasing on September 12, 2025, alongside its music video and the album's new release date, with the album now announced to be dropping on September 19. However, due to the release of Cardi B's sophomore album, Am I the Drama? being released on the same date, the album was pushed back to September 26. The album was released alongside a music video for the fifth track, "Fucking Told U".

On September 28, Young Thug held a surprise concert in front of the Fulton County Courthouse in Atlanta, where he urged local attendees to "stop the violence." Streamed to YouTube and Twitch, Thug performed "Ski" and "Digits", among other hit songs. On September 30, 2025, in support of the album, Young Thug made an appearance on internet personality Adin Ross' Kick stream, in what was one of his first major media appearances since his release from prison. During the stream, Young Thug controversially declared his support for Sean Combs amidst Combs' sentencing.

Thug announced a 2026 tour in support of the album with Quavo on September 30, 2025. On October 3, 2025, an expanded version of the album with 7 additional songs, titled the "Supernova edition", was released. A music video for "Blaming Jesus" was released on October 23, 2025.

== Critical reception ==
Professional ratings
Aggregate scores
Source	Rating
Metacritic	50/100
Review scores
Source	Rating
AllMusic	2.5/5 stars
NME	2/5 stars
Pitchfork	4.3/10
Rolling Stone	3/5 stars

According to the review aggregator Metacritic, UY Scuti received "mixed or average reviews" based on a weighted average score of 50 out of 100 from 4 critic scores.

HotNewHipHop's review called the album "uneven but undeniably compelling" and concluded that "Tracks of vulnerability and high-octane brilliance sit alongside moments that feel symbolic, reactionary, or filler." Alphonse Pierre of Pitchfork wrote that the album "offers irony and defensiveness without sincerity or style" and described it as "a boringly chaotic album so desperate for attention that Thug turns himself into a meme." He described "Ninja" as "one of the most shameless rap songs in Thug's catalog." NME's Fred-Garratt Stanley wrote that the album lacked substance and that it had a feeling of "a cynical, cash-grabbing motivation." AllMusic's review concludes that "the essence of what made him so special is largely lost in a clutter of disconnected or only partially realized ideas." Writing for Rolling Stone, Mosi Reeves described the album as "a hot mess of conflicted emotions, empty braggadocio, poor technique, and heartbreaking yet tiresome crying jags."

== Commercial performance ==
In the US, UY Scuti debuted at number six on the Billboard 200 with 52,000 equivalent album units and 54.3M streams in its first week. It is Young Thug's ninth top-ten album.

== Track listing ==
UY Scuti digital edition track listing
No.	Title	Writer(s)	Producer(s)	Length
1.	"Ninja"	Jeffery "Young Thug" Williams; Joshua "Southside" Luellen; Carlton "Car!ton" McDowell; Peyton "PeytonTheAlien" McDowell	Southside; Car!ton; PeytonTheAlien	3:50
2.	"Yuck" (featuring Ken Carson)	Williams; Kenyatta "Ken Carson" Frazier; Corey "DJ" Moon; Taurus Currie; Matvey "Sinful YTS" Grishichev	DJ Moon; Taurus; Sinful YTS	4:08
3.	"On the News" (featuring Cardi B)	Williams; Belcalis "Cardi B" Almánzar; London "on Da Track" Holmes	London on Da Track	3:40
4.	"Catch Me I'm Falling"	Williams; Wesley "Wheezy" Glass; Dorathea "HiDoraah" Fallen; Carlton "Car!ton" McDowell	Wheezy; Car!ton	3:26
5.	"Fucking Told U"	Williams; Dwayne "D Rich" Richardson; Leland "Metro Boomin" Wayne	D Rich; Metro Boomin	2:54
6.	"Whoopty Doo"	Williams; Currie; Glass; Dounia “Yume” Aznou	Taurus; Wheezy; Yume	3:58
7.	"Blaming Jesus"	Williams; Mohkom "Money Musik" Bhangal; Darius "Wonderyo" Poviliunas; Dorathea "HiDoraah" Fallen	Money Musik; Wonderyo	3:30
8.	"Sad Spider"	Williams; Dylan Hyde; Nicholas "Slowburnz" Santos; Poviliunas	Hyde; Slowburnz; Wonderyo	3:28
9.	"RIP Big & Mack" (featuring T.I.)	Williams; Clifford "T.I." Harris; Holmes; Currie	London on Da Track; Taurus	4:01
10.	"Invest into You" (featuring Mariah the Scientist)	Williams; Mariah "the Scientist" Amani Buckles	10K	3:11
11.	"I'm So Dope"	Williams; Martell "FBG Goat" Smith-Williams; Luka "Gabe Lucas" Berman; Will "BabyXD" Carr-Halper	FBG Goat; Gabe Lucas; XD	2:35
12.	"Pardon My Back" (featuring Lil Baby)	Williams; Dominique "Lil Baby" Armani Jones; Glass	Wheezy; Juke Wong	2:39
13.	"Mami" (featuring Sexyy Red)	Williams; Janae "Sexyy Red" Wherry; Holmes; Maximilian "MacShooter" McFarlin; Luellen	London on Da Track; MacShooter; Southside	2:47
14.	"Whaddup Jesus" (featuring YFN Lucci)	Williams; Rayshawn "YFN Lucci" Bennett; Bryan "TM88" Simmons	TM88	3:38
15.	"Walk Down" (featuring 21 Savage)	Williams; Shéyaa "21 Savage" Abraham-Joseph; Smith-Williams; Jacob "Juko" Sclaver; Maxwell "Kyuro" Madejczyk; Holmes	FBG Goat; Juko; Kyuro; London on Da Track	2:40
16.	"Pipe Down" (featuring Travis Scott)	Williams; Jacques "Travis Scott" Webster; Wayne	Metro Boomin	3:30
17.	"Spider or Jeffery" (featuring Quavo)	Williams; Quavious "Quavo" Keyate Marshall; Holmes; Sean Momberger	London on Da Track; Sean Momberger	3:12
18.	"Revenge" (featuring Lil Gotit and 1300Saint)	Williams; Semaja "Lil Gotit" Render; DeAndre "1300Saint" McKee; Holmes	London on Da Track	3:25
19.	"Money on Money" (featuring Future)	Williams; Nayvadius "Future" Wilburn; Jaden "9Jay" Christodoulou; Jason "BeatzByRRose" Rosenberg; Dylan "Dez Wright" Cleary-Krell; Lucas "Juke Wong" DePante; Luellen; Glass	9Jay; BeatzByRRoze; Dez Wright; Juke Wong; Southside; Wheezy	3:56
20.	"Dreams Rarely Do Come True" (featuring Mariah the Scientist)	Williams; Mariah "the Scientist" Buckles; "ATL" Jacob Canady; Brandon "Brandosound" Crosby; Sclaver; Luellen; Glass; Israel "BlueSoundRoom" Formenti	ATL Jacob; Brandosound; Juko; Southside; Wheezy; BlueSoundRoom	6:04
21.	"Miss My Dogs"	Williams; Sclaver; Holmes; John "DJYachtMaster" Elby; Nicholas "Nick Hustles" Arter	Juko; London on Da Track	7:02
Total length:				77:34

Archive Edition 1 track listing
No.	Title	Length
22.	"Fighting Depression"	4:13
Total length:		81:47

Archive Edition 2 track listing
No.	Title	Length
22.	"It's OK to Cry"	3:47
Total length:		81:21

Supernova Edition track listing
No.	Title	Writer(s)	Producer(s)	Length
1.	"By the Police"	Michael "Mike Mixer" McWhite; Eliot Bohr; Canady; Williams	ATL Jacob; Mike Mixer; Eliot Bohr	3:52
2.	"Pussy Smell Like This"	Jacob "BeatsByJuko" Sclaver; Holmes; Taurus "Taurus" Currie Jr.; Williams	BeatsByJuko; London on Da Track; Taurus	2:27
3.	"All Your Time"	Dwan "DY Krazy" Avery; Williams	DY Krazy	2:59
4.	"Safe"	Leon Thomas; Masamune "Rex" Kudo; Glass; Williams	Wheezy; Leon Thomas; Rex Kudo	4:17
5.	"I Put A" (featuring Lil Keed)	Raqhid "Lil Keed" Render; Michael "Mike WiLL Made-It" Williams II; Asheton "Pluss" Hogan; Williams	Mike WiLL Made-It; Pluss	3:23
6.	"Rosetta Stone"	Brian Lee; Williams	Brian Lee	4:44
7.	"Yes You Can"	Tommy "TBHits" Brown; Williams	TBHits	3:23
Total length:				102:39

Abridged physical edition (CD/Vinyl) track listing
No.	Title	Length
1.	"Sad Slime"	3:28
2.	"Fucking Told U"	2:54
3.	"Money on Money" (featuring Future)	3:56
4.	"Walk Down" (featuring 21 Savage)	2:40
5.	"Yuck" (featuring Ken Carson)	4:08
6.	"Spit in the Mouth"	3:31
7.	"Pipe Down" (featuring Travis Scott)	3:30
8.	"Birthday Boy" (featuring Mariah the Scientist)	3:17
9.	"Pussy Smell Like This"	2:27
10.	"Mami" (featuring Sexyy Red)	2:47
11.	"I'm So Dope"	2:34
12.	"On the News"	3:15
Total length:		38:27

Notes

- "Spider or Jeffrey" was not originally included on the album, but was added to the album on streaming services 14 hours after the original release.
- "Sad Spider" is alternatively titled "Sad Slime" on physical versions.
- The songwriting and production credits for "Invest into You", "Pardon My Back", "Spider or Jeffrey", and all tracks from the Archive and Supernova editions are unavailable on streaming services.

== Charts ==
=== Weekly charts ===
Weekly chart performance for UY Scuti
Chart (2025)	Peak position
Australian Albums (ARIA)	36
Australian Hip Hop/R&B Albums (ARIA)	4
Austrian Albums (Ö3 Austria)	68
Belgian Albums (Ultratop Flanders)	130
Belgian Albums (Ultratop Wallonia)	178
Canadian Albums (Billboard)	19
Dutch Albums (Album Top 100)	87
French Albums (SNEP)	106
New Zealand Albums (RMNZ)	29
Nigerian Albums (TurnTable)	25
Norwegian Albums (IFPI Norge)	74
Portuguese Albums (AFP)	104
Swiss Albums (Schweizer Hitparade)	29
UK Albums (Official Charts)	84
US Billboard 200	6
US Top R&B/Hip-Hop Albums (Billboard)	2

=== Year-end charts ===
Year-end chart performance for UY Scuti
Chart (2025)	Position
US Top R&B/Hip-Hop Albums (Billboard)	88

== Release history ==
Release dates and formats for UY Scuti
Region	Date	Label(s)	Format(s)	Edition(s)	Ref.
Various	September 26, 2025	YSL; 300	Digital download; streaming; CD; LP	Standard	

== See also ==
- 2025 in hip-hop
- YSL Records racketeering trial
