= Lil Jairmy =

American rapper

- Birth name: Jairmy Rashaan Long
- Born: 1997 or 1998 (age 27–28) Baytown, Texas U.S.
- Genres: Hip hop; Trap
- Occupations: Rapper; songwriter
- Years active: 2015-present
- Labels: 300 Entertainment

Jairmy Rashaan Long known professionally as Lil Jairmy, is an American rapper and songwriter from Houston, Texas. He is signed to 300 Entertainment.

== Career ==
In 2015, he released his first song "Trapped Out". In 2019, he released his first mixtape Excuse My Absence with an appearance from American rapper Lil Baby. In 2020, he released his project Can't Rush the Vibe. In July 2021, he released his project Gas God with appearances from 42 Dugg, EST Gee, Hotboii, Big30, and Rylo Rodriguez. In July 2022, he released his single "Supercharge" featuring American rapper Moneybagg Yo. In September 2022, he hosted a "gas-giveaway" where he promised to fill the first 100 cars that appeared at a gas station with fuel. Also In September 2022, he released his project Gas God 2, the sequel to his 2021 project, with appearances from rappers Future, Moneybagg Yo, EST Gee, and Lil Keed.
