= Keed Talk to 'Em =

Mixtape by Lil Keed
- Released: December 12, 2018
- Recorded: 2018
- Genre: Hip hop; trap
- Length: 44:53
- Label: YSL; 300
- Producer: Bryant Troy; Chilli; Cubeatz; DY; Epikh Pro; Goose; Honorable C.N.O.T.E.; M-80; Mattazik; Mooktoven; Payday; Pyrex; Richie Souf; Ricky Racks; Riko Spazzin; Smash David; Supah Mario; YoungBoyBrown

Lil Keed chronology
Trapped in Cleveland 2 (2018)	Keed Talk to 'Em (2018)	Long Live Mexico (2019)

Singles from Keed Talk to 'Em
- 1. "Balenciaga" Released: November 11, 2018; 2. "Nameless" Released: December 11, 2018

Keed Talk to 'Em is the fourth mixtape by American rapper Lil Keed. It was released on December 12, 2018, by YSL Records and 300 Entertainment.

== Background ==
Featuring 15 songs and collaborators including Slimelife Shawty, Lil Duke, Lil Durk, Trippie Redd, Brandy, Yung Mal, Dae Dae, Lil Yachty, 21 Savage, and Paper Lovee. The mixtape is his second mixtape after Trapped in Cleveland 2, which was released in July 2018.

== Singles ==
"Balenciaga" featuring 21 Savage was released as the lead single from the album. "Nameless" was released as the second single from the album.

== Track listing ==
Credits adapted from AllMusic.

No.	Title	Producer(s)	Length
1.	"Where I'm From"	YoungBoyBrown	2:48
2.	"Water by G"	Bryant Troy	2:47
3.	"Player" (featuring Paper Lovee)	Payday; Chilli	2:31
4.	"Say Something" (featuring Slimelife Shawty)	Ricky Racks	3:43
5.	"Nameless"	Goose	3:05
6.	"Red Hot" (featuring Trippie Redd)	Honorable C.N.O.T.E.; M-80	3:18
7.	"Balenciaga" (featuring 21 Savage)	Mooktoven	4:36
8.	"Don't Do No Playing"	Mooktoven	3:01
9.	"Wop Remix" (featuring Lil Yachty)	Mooktoven	3:14
10.	"Definitely" (featuring Lil Durk)	DY; Riko Spazzin	2:58
11.	"What I Do"	Pyrex; Cubeatz	4:12
12.	"Black Out" (featuring Dae Dae)	Richie Souf	4:22
13.	"Ain't Seen My Face" (featuring Lil Duke)	Mattazik	3:21
14.	"Smack On God" (featuring Brandy)	Epikh Pro	2:50
15.	"All by My Lonely" (featuring Yung Mal)	Smash David; Supah Mario	3:45
Total length:			44:53
