= Todd Moscowitz =

American businessman

- Born: March 30, 1974 (age 52); United States
- Education: New York University (JD)
- Occupations: Record executive; lawyer

Todd Moscowitz is an American record executive and attorney. He is the founder and CEO of Alamo Records, a division of Sony Music Entertainment, and Santa Anna Label Group, the distributor of OVO Sound. Previously, Moscowitz served as co-president and CEO of Warner Bros. Records and co-founded 300 Entertainment.

== Career ==
While attending law school, Moscowitz worked for Rush Communications. After graduating from NYU, Moscowitz worked as a lawyer in the mergers and acquisitions department of the international law firm Skadden, Arps, Slate, Meagher & Flom for a year before being asked by Lyor Cohen to rejoin the company as the head of Rush Communications, the holding company for all of the entertainment assets of Cohen and partner Russell Simmons.

Moscowitz took the titles of President of Def Jam Music Publishing, President of Def Jam Interactive Gaming, and a member of the Board of Directors of Phat Farm Inc. One year later the title of SVP of Business Affairs for Def Jam Recordings. Shortly thereafter, he was elevated to the title of General Manager of Def Jam Recordings. In 2000 after overseeing the sale of Def Jam Recordings to Universal Music Group and the subsequent merger of the staffs, Moscowitz left to rejoin his old friends Lighty (Chris Lighty) and Scott (Mona Scott-Young) at Violator. In 2004 he became the President of Asylum Records. Moscowitz later served as co-president and CEO of Warner Bros. Records from September 14, 2010, to January 2013.

In 2013, he co-founded independent label, 300 Entertainment with Lyor Cohen, Roger Gold, Kevin Liles in partnership with Twitter. The label currently includes Fetty Wap, Young Thug, Eric Bellinger, YNW Melly, Alex Winston, Shy Glizzy, Gunna, Tee Grizzley, Lil Keed, Jacquie Lee, Highly Suspect, Panama, Cheat Codes and Megan Thee Stallion, among others. Atlantic Records, a sister of Warner Bros. Records, distributes releases of 300 Entertainment, and its owner, Warner Music Group, completed acquisition of 300 Entertainment, worth $400 million, in December 2021.

In late 2016, he founded Cold Heat Records, which later renamed to Alamo Records, under Interscope Records. He later signed artists including Rod Wave, Lil Durk, Blackbear, Lil Gotit, Smokepurpp, Wifisfuneral and more to the label. Sony Music Entertainment acquired Alamo Records in June 2021, however, Moscowitz retained his position as CEO of the label.

In January 2023, Moscowitz launched Santa Anna Label Group, a joint venture record label with Sony Music. In January 2024, Santa Anna made an investment into Drake's independent record label, OVO Sound, taking over the label's distribution. The following week, Santa Anna made an investment into the hip-hop label, Trill Entertainment, likewise taking over the label's distribution.

By 2016, Moscowitz was the manager of Gucci Mane.
