= Lil Gotit =

American rapper (born 1999)

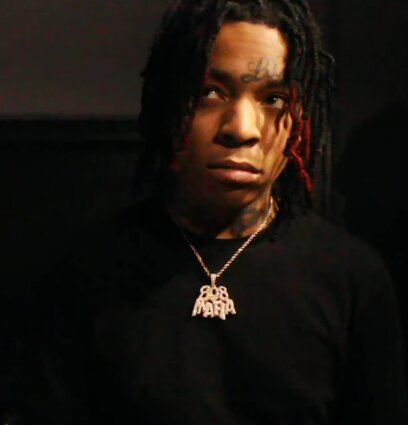
- Lil Gotit in 2019

Background information
- Also known as: Hood Baby; Maja Got It; ElMO
- Born: Semaja Zair Render; August 6, 1999 (age 27); Atlanta, Georgia, U.S.
- Genres: Hip-hop; trap
- Occupations: Rapper; singer; songwriter
- Years active: 2017–present
- Labels: ONErpm; Alamo; Sony
- Children: 1
- Relatives: Lil Keed (brother)

Semaja Zair Render (born August 6, 1999), known professionally as Lil Gotit, is an American rapper and singer.

== Early life ==
Semaja Zair Render was born in Atlanta, Georgia. The youngest of seven children, Render was raised on Southeast Atlanta's Conley Road. After dropping out of high school during his freshman year, Render moved to Cleveland Avenue in Southwest Atlanta. Like his late brother and fellow rapper Lil Keed, who was one year older, Gotit did not start taking rap seriously until his friend Rudy was killed a few days before the release of the group compilation mixtape Young Slime Season in 2016.

Gotit then began releasing songs with his brother Lil Keed, they collaborated on the songs: "Trap Bunkin", "Dirty Dancer" and "All Season". Described as one of Atlanta's next rising rap stars. The name Lil Gotit was derived from Maja Gotit, a nickname inspired by him "having everything". He has cited Young Thug as his mentor.

== Career ==
=== 2018–2019: Beginnings, Hood Baby and Crazy But It's True ===
Gotit has collaborated with Keed and Lil Uzi Vert for the song "Heavy Metal". In November 2018, he worked with Lil Uzi Vert again to release the song "Hercules". He has also released the song "Superstar" with Gunna. Gotit released his debut studio album Hood Baby via Alamo Records, consisting of 18 singles including "Loco" and "Small Todger". The album, produced by Yung Lan, was released on November 16, 2018. The album featured singles including "Blue Slimes" featuring Gunna, Skooly and Lil Keed as well as "Drip Severe". On March 14, 2019, Lil Gotit released his second studio album, Crazy But It's True. The project had features from artists including Gunna, Wali Da Great, Lil Keed and Lil Durk.

On March 29, 2019, Gotit released a music video for his single "Drop The Top" featuring Lil Keed. On April 11, 2019, Gotit released his single "Never Met" with a music video. On May 2, 2019, Gotit released his single "Lil Ralph" accompanied with a music video. On May 8, 2019, Famous Dex released an audio for a new song "Fully Loaded" featuring Lil Gotit. A music video for Fully Loaded was released later on May 29, 2019. On the same day animation video of Gotit's single "Da Real HoodBabies (Remix)" featuring Lil Baby was also released. On July 1, 2019, Gotit released his single "Pop My Shit", the song was accompanied with a music video, along with a remix featuring Lil Keed that later released on August 20. On August 7, 2019, Gotit released his single "Oh Ok" accompanied with a music video.

=== 2019–present: The Real Goat, Hood Baby 2, Top Chef Gotit, and The Cheater ===
On August 22, 2019, Gotit announced the release of his third studio album Hood Baby 2. On September 5, 2019, Gotit released his new mixtape The Real Goat featuring 16 new songs. The mixtape was released after his previous announcement of releasing his forthcoming album Hood Baby 2 later in the year. On September 12, 2019, Gotit released a music video for the remix of "Da Real Hood Babies" featuring Lil Baby. On October 9, 2019, Gotit released a music video for his The Real Goat song "No Talking" featuring Slimeball Yayo.

On January 30, 2020, Lil Gotit's collaborative single "A'Team (You Ain't Safe)" along with Lil Yachty, Lil Keed, and Zaytoven was released. It was the second single released off their forthcoming collaborative album "A-Team". On February 6, 2020, Lil Gotit released his single "Bet Up" and announced his forthcoming project Superstar Creature, executive produced by London on da Track. On February 12, 2020, Gotit released his Zaytoven produced single "Drip Jacker".

On April 9, 2020, Gotit released the single "Bricks in the Attic", the first song from his third studio album Hood Baby 2. On April 23, 2020, Gotit eventually released the Hood Baby 2 album. The album features artists including Gunna, Future, Lil Keed, and Lil Yachty.

On August 10, 2020, Gotit released his collaborative single "What It Was" with Future, accompanied with a music video for his then-upcoming album Crazy But It's True 2, which was later renamed to Top Chef Gotit.

On March 17, 2021, Gotit released his single "Wok", accompanied with a music video ahead of his fourth studio album, Top Chef Gotit, which was released on June 10, 2021.

On December 8, 2021, Gotit released his collaborative single "Walk Down" with CEO Trayle, Lil Double 0, and late rapper Biggz, which was accompanied with a music video.

On May 4, 2022, Gotit released his fifth studio album, The Cheater.

On June 28, 2022, Gotit released his single "MF Trimm", which was Lil Keed's favourite song and thus was released as a tribute to Lil Keed, who died a month before.

== Live performances ==
Lil Gotit performed at the Audiomack stage at the Rolling Loud Festival on May 10, 2019, in Miami, Florida performing on the same stage as Lil Durk, Juice Wrld, Rich the Kid, and others. On September 14, 2019, Lil Gotit and Lil Keed performed at The Novo theater in Los Angeles. Fellow rappers Drake, Lil Duke, and Young Thug were also present on stage throughout the performance. He performed at the Rolling Loud Festival in Oakland on September 29, 2019. On October 12, 2019, Gotit performed in the Rolling Loud New York festival and performed at the A3C Festival in Atlanta the next day.

== Discography ==
=== Studio albums ===
List of studio albums with selected chart positions.
Title	Album details	Peak chart positions	
Title	Album details	US	US Heat.
Hood Baby	Released: November 16, 2018; Label: Alamo; Formats: Digital download, streaming	—	—
Crazy But It's True	Released: March 13, 2019; Label: Alamo; Formats: Digital download, streaming	—	—
Hood Baby 2	Released: April 24, 2020; Label: Alamo; Formats: Digital download, streaming	200	2
Top Chef Gotit	Released: June 10, 2021; Label: Alamo; Format: Digital download, streaming	—	14
The Cheater	Released: May 4, 2022; Label: Alamo, Sony; Format: Digital download, streaming	—	20
Shut the Door, Nobody Listening	Released: June 28, 2024; Label: Self-released; Format: Digital download, streaming	—	—

=== Collaborative albums ===
List of collaborative studio albums, with selected details
Title	Details
Fraternal (with Lil Keed)	Released: October 31, 2025; Label: ONErpm, YSL, 300; Format: Digital download, streaming

=== Mixtapes ===
List of mixtapes, with selected details
Title	Details
The Real Goat	Released: September 20, 2019; Label: Alamo; Format: Digital download, streaming
Superstar Creature	Released: February 21, 2020; Label: Alamo; Format: Digital download, streaming

=== Collaborative mixtapes ===
List of collaborative mixtapes, with selected details
Title	Mixtape details
A-Team (with Zaytoven, Lil Keed, and Lil Yachty)	Released: February 28, 2020; Label: Familiar Territory, Opposition Records; Format: Digital download, streaming

=== Extended plays ===
List of extended plays, with selected details
Title	Details
PG13	Released: May 22, 2026; Label: ONErpm; Format: Digital download, streaming

=== Collaborative extended plays ===
List of collaborative extended plays, with selected details
Title	Details
Hood Fifty (with 10fifty)	Released: December 13, 2019; Label: 10fifty, Alamo; Format: Digital download, streaming

=== Singles ===
==== As a lead artist ====
Title	Year	Peak chart positions	Album
Title	Year	US R&B/HH	Album
"Superstar" (featuring Gunna)	2018	—	Hood Baby
"Big Bertha"	2018	—	Hood Baby
"Hercules" (featuring Lil Uzi Vert)	2018	—	Hood Baby
"Drip Severe"	2018	—	Hood Baby
"Freestyle"	2018	—	Non-album single
"Da Real HoodBabies" (solo or remix featuring Lil Baby)	2019	87	Crazy But It's True
"Now"	2019	—	Crazy But It's True
"Drop the Top" (featuring Lil Keed)	2019	—	Crazy But It's True
"Lil Ralph"	2019	—	Non-album singles
"Never Met"	2019	—	Non-album singles
"Pop My Shit" (solo or remix featuring Lil Keed)	2019	—	Non-album singles
"Oh Ok"	2019	—	Non-album singles
"Drip On"	2019	—	Non-album singles
"Real Sosa Boy"	2019	—	Non-album singles
"Patek Water"	2019	—	Hood Fifty
"Drip Jacker"	2020	—	A-Team
"Bet Up"	2020	—	Superstar Creature
"Free Melly" (featuring Polo G)	2020	—	Superstar Creature
"Bricks In The Attic"	2020	—	Hood Baby 2
"Never Legit"	2020	—	Hood Baby 2
"What It Was" (featuring Future)	2020	—	non-album singles
"Tellin Ya" (featuring Lil PJ)	2020	—	non-album singles
"Dead Walkin"	2020	—	non-album singles
"Wok"	2021	—	Top Chef Gotit
"Burnt N Turnt" (with Nav)	2021	—	Top Chef Gotit
"MF Trimm"	2022	—	Non-album single

==== As a featured artist ====
Title	Year	Album
"Heavy Metal" (Lil Uzi Vert featuring Lil Keed and Lil Gotit)	2018	Non-album singles
"Fully Loaded" (Famous Dex featuring Lil Gotit)	2019	Non-album singles
"Drip Babies" (Hoodrich Pablo Juan featuring Lil Keed and Lil Gotit)	2019	Non-album singles
"Action" (Yung Mal featuring Lil Gotit)	2019	Iceburg
"Glocks & Drums" (Lil Mexico featuring Lil Gotit)	2019	Life of an Outlaw
"Mr. Drip" (Żabson featuring Deemz, Otsochodzi and Lil Gotit)	2019	Internaziomal
"No Offense" (Slayter featuring Lil Gotit)	2019	Cold At Night
"You Ain't Safe" (Lil Yachty featuring Lil Keed and Lil Gotit)	2020	A-Team
"John Wall" (Zaytoven featuring Yo Gotti, Smokepurpp and Lil Gotit)	2020	Pack Just Landed Vol. 2
"Bookoo Bucks" (Nasty C featuring Lil Gotit and Lil Keed)	2020	Zulu Man with Some Power
"Gang Outside" (Kizaru featuring Lil Gotit)	2022	Non-album single

=== Other charted songs ===
List of songs, with selected chart positions, showing year released and album name
Title	Year	Peak chart position	Album
Title	Year	US Bub.	Album
"Hoodie" (Young Thug featuring Lil Gotit and BSlime)	2023	23	Business Is Business
