= Lil Keed =

American rapper (1998–2022)

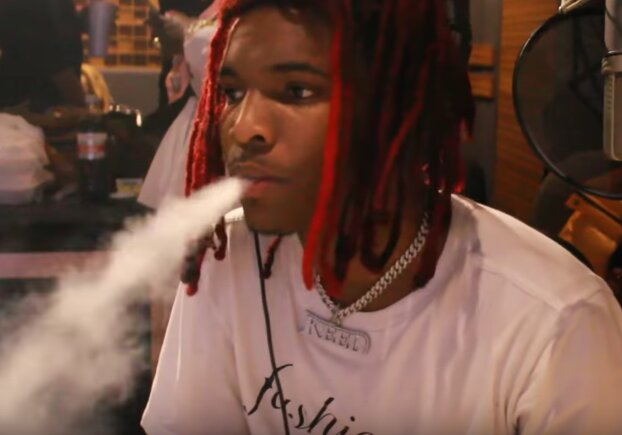
- Lil Keed in 2019

Background information
- Also known as: Keed; Prince Slime
- Born: Raqhid Jevon Render; March 16, 1998; Atlanta, Georgia, U.S.
- Died: May 13, 2022 (aged 24) Los Angeles, California, U.S.
- Genres: Southern hip-hop; trap
- Occupation: Rapper
- Years active: 2016–2022
- Labels: YSL; 300; Atlantic
- Website: keedtalktoem.com

Raqhid Jevon Render (March 16, 1998 – May 13, 2022), known professionally as Lil Keed, was an American rapper from Atlanta, Georgia. He was signed to Young Thug's record label YSL Records, an imprint of 300 Entertainment. His 2018 single, "Nameless", reached number 42 on the Billboard Hip Hop/R&B Songs Airplay chart.

== Early life ==
Raqhid Jevon Render was born in Atlanta, Georgia, on March 16, 1998 The fifth of seven children, Render lived on Conley Road in Southeast Atlanta and later moving to Cleveland Ave in Southwest Atlanta. After the death of his close friend, Rudy, Render started taking rapping seriously in 2016. Render had six brothers and one sister; his younger brother is rapper Lil Gotit.

Despite his parents separating at an early age, both were present in Render's upbringing. During his teenage years, Keed briefly worked at Subway and McDonald's. Being close to a studio, Keed would record music almost on a daily basis. Render first started making music with his younger brother, posting songs online and scoring some regional hits in 2017. Render also had one son named Nigar P. Bands.

== Career ==
=== 2018: Trapped on Cleveland 2 and Keed Talk to 'Em ===
On July 23, 2018, Keed released his single "Slatt Rock" featuring Paper Lovee along with his mixtape Trapped on Cleveland 2. In October 2018, Keed and his younger brother Lil Gotit featured in fellow rapper Lil Uzi Vert's song "Heavy Metal". On December 12, 2018, Lil Keed released another mixtape, Keed Talk to 'Em, which featured the main single "Nameless", as well as "Balenciaga" featuring 21 Savage, "Red Hot" featuring Trippie Redd, and others. Keed Talk to 'Em also featured Lil Durk, Lil Yachty, and Brandy.

=== 2019: Long Live Mexico ===
On March 11, 2019, Keed featured in Lil Gotit's single "Drop the Top". On March 14, 2019, Keed released the song "Move It", featuring fellow Atlanta-based artist Offset. On March 27, 2019, Lil Keed was nominated for the 10th spot for the XXL Freshman cover. On April 24, 2019, Keed released his single "Oh My God". On May 6, 2019, Lil Keed released "Proud of Me" featuring Young Thug. The song, along with the previously released single "Oh My God", accompanied his debut studio album Long Live Mexico. Keed stated the idea behind the title of the album was inspired by his friend named Mexico who had died earlier in the year while Keed was on tour with Trippie Redd. On May 29, 2019, Keed released his new single "Pull Up" featuring Lil Uzi Vert and YNW Melly. The song was released by Young Thug's YSL Records and 300 Entertainment. On June 13, 2019, "Long Live Mexico" was released. It also featured artists such as Gunna, Lil Uzi Vert, Roddy Ricch, YNW Melly, and Young Thug. The album peaked at number 26 on the Billboard 200, and number 11 on the Hot Rap Albums Chart, becoming the highest charting project of his career.

On July 18, 2019, Hoodrich Pablo Juan's single "Drip Babies" featuring Keed and Lil Gotit was released. On July 23, 2019, Lil Keed featured on Future's single "Undefeated". On that same day, he released a music video for his Long Live Mexico single "HBS". The music video was directed by Cole Bennett. On August 14, 2019, the music video for Lil Keed and Guap Tarantino's collaborative single "Churches Peppers" was released on WorldStarHipHop. On September 3, 2019, Keed released his Mooktoven-produced single "Saliva". On September 18, 2019, Keed released his single "Swap It Out" featuring Lil Duke. On October 17, 2019, a music video for Lil Gotit and Lil Keed's collaborative single "Brotherly Love" was released on behalf of Alamo Records. On November 7, 2019, 88GLAM and Lil Keed released their collaborative single "Bankroll". On November 27, 2019, a music video for Lil Keed's Long Live Mexico single "Snake" was released. On November 21, 2019, a music video of Young Scooter and Lil Keed's collaborative single "Trap Museum" was released on behalf of WMG. On December 6, 2019, Keed's collaborative single "Accomplishments" with Lil Yachty and Zaytoven was released along with a music video.

=== 2020: Trapped on Cleveland 3 ===
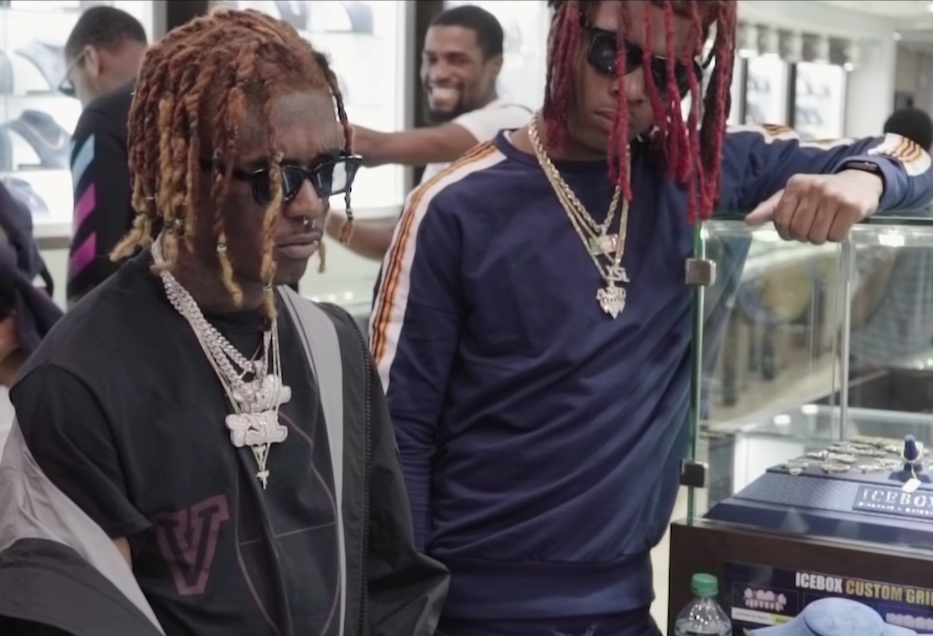
Lil Keed (right) alongside Lil Uzi Vert

On January 11, 2020, Keed announced his second studio album Trapped on Cleveland 3. On January 30, 2020, Keed's collaborative single "A-Team (You Ain't Safe)" along with Lil Yachty, Lil Gotit, and Zaytoven was released. It was the second single released off their collaborative album A-Team.

On April 15, 2020, Keed released his single "No Dealings", accompanied with a music video. On May 15, 2020, Keed released his second single "Wavy"; however, the song did not appear on Trapped on Cleveland 3, but the remix featuring American rapper Travis Scott did. On June 12, 2020, Keed released the single "Fox 5", featuring American rapper Gunna. Gunfire rang out during the filming of the music video for the song, resulting in two people injured. On July 31, 2020, Keed revealed the release date and cover art for Trapped on Cleveland 3. On August 3, 2020, he released another single titled "She Know", featuring American rapper Lil Baby. On August 7, 2020, Keed released Trapped on Cleveland 3. The album features artists such as 42 Dugg, Future, Gunna, Lil Baby, Travis Scott, Ty Dolla Sign, and Young Thug. On August 11, 2020, Keed was included on XXL's 2020 Freshman Class.

On October 27, 2020, Keed revealed the tracklist for his deluxe edition of Trapped On Cleveland 3. On October 30, 2020, he released the deluxe version with 18 more tracks featuring additional guest appearances from O.T. Genasis, Lil Gotit, Quavo, Lil Duke, Yak Gotti, and Chris Brown.

=== 2023: Keed Talk to 'Em 2 ===
On February 3, 2023, Keed's estate released the song "Long Way to Go". On March 4, 2023, they announced the release date and the album cover on Instagram. On March 8, Keed's estate announced the tracklist for the album, and the song "Self Employed" was released on the same day.

On March 17, 2023, Keed Talk to 'Em 2 was released, a project featuring big names like Young Thug, Trippie Redd, Nav, Lil Gotit, Cordae and many more. The album contains 20 tracks with a total duration of 1 hour and 9 minutes.

== Musical styles ==
According to XXL, Keed's style was frequently compared to Young Thug, as the two rappers both grew up on Cleveland Avenue and Keed was signed to YSL Records. Chicago Reader described Keed's style as similar to Young Thug's while incorporating his own distinct flow.

According to Pitchfork, Keed used elements of Young Thug's versatile flows as a foundation, specifically the high-pitched delivery.

=== Influences ===
According to an interview by WHTA Hot 107.9, Keed stated he was inspired listening to music by his neighbor Young Thug, as well as Chingy, Peewee Longway, and Big Bank Black.

== Live performances ==
At the Rolling Loud Festival on May 11, 2019, in Miami, Florida, Lil Keed performed on the same stage as Young Thug, Chief Keef, Lil Wayne, and Comethazine. He was scheduled to perform at the Rolling Loud Festival in Oakland later on September 29, 2019. On September 14, 2019, Keed and Lil Gotit performed at The Novo theater in Los Angeles. Fellow rapper Drake was present and on stage alongside Keed throughout the performance. Young Thug and Lil Duke also briefly appeared on stage. On October 12, 2019, Keed performed in the Rolling Loud New York festival. Keed also performed at the A3C Festival in Atlanta on October 13, 2019. On October 27, 2019, Keed performed at the Mala Luna festival in San Antonio, Texas.

== Death ==
Render died on May 13, 2022. It was confirmed that Render died of liver and kidney failure related to eosinophilia. After complaining of stomach and back pains, Render was taken to the hospital where he suffered a seizure and died the next morning.

== Discography ==
=== Studio albums ===
List of albums, with year released
Title	Details	Peak chart positions			Sales
Title	Details	US	US R&B/HH	US Rap	Sales
Long Live Mexico	Released: June 14, 2019; Label: YSL, 300; Format: Digital download, streaming	26	11	10	• US: 16,000
Trapped on Cleveland 3	Released: August 7, 2020; Label: YSL, 300; Format: Digital download, streaming	41	26	23	• US: 16,000
Keed Talk to 'Em 2	Released: March 17, 2023; Label: YSL, 300; Format: Digital download, streaming	—	—	—	

=== Collaborative albums ===
Fraternal: Keed Edition (with Lil Gotit)

- Released: October 31, 2025
- Label: ONErpm, YSL, 300
- Format: Digital download, streaming

Fraternal: Gotit Edition (with Lil Gotit)

- Released: 2026
- Label: ONErpm, YSL, 300
- Format: Digital download, streaming

=== Mixtapes ===
List of mixtapes, with selected details
Title	Details
Trapped on Cleveland	Released February 5, 2018; Format: Digital download
Slime Avenue	Released March 24, 2018; Format: Digital download
Trapped on Cleveland 2	Released: July 23, 2018; Label: YSL Records, 300; Format: Digital download, streaming
Keed Talk to 'Em	Released: December 12, 2018; Label: YSL Records, 300; Formats: Digital download, streaming
A-Team (with Zaytoven, Lil Gotit, and Lil Yachty)	Released: February 28, 2020; Label: Familiar Territory; Formats: Digital download, streaming

=== Singles ===
==== As lead artist ====
List of singles as lead artist, with selected chart positions and certifications, showing year released and album name
Title	Year	Peak chart positions		Certifications	Album
Title	Year	US R&B/HH Air.	US R&B/HH Main.	Certifications	Album
"Balenciaga" (featuring 21 Savage)	2018	—	—		Keed Talk to 'Em
"Nameless"	2018	42	30	RIAA: Gold	Keed Talk to 'Em
"Pull Up" (featuring Lil Uzi Vert and YNW Melly)	2019	—	—		Long Live Mexico
"Saliva"	2019	—	—		Non-album singles
"Swap It Out" (featuring Lil Duke)	2019	—	—		Non-album singles
"Hightop Shoes" (with Zaytoven and Lil Yachty)	2020	—	—		A-Team
"No Dealings"	2020	—	—		Non-album singles
"Wavy"	2020	—	—		Non-album singles
"Fox 5" (featuring Gunna)	2020	—	—		Trapped on Cleveland 3
"Show Me What You Got" (featuring O.T. Genasis)	2020	—	—		Trapped on Cleveland 3
"Long Way to Go"	2023	—	—		Keed Talk to 'Em 2
"Self Employed"	2023	—	—		Keed Talk to 'Em 2
"—" denotes a recording that did not chart or was not released in that territory.

==== As featured artist ====
Title	Year	Album
"Churches Peppers" (Guap Tarantino featuring Lil Keed)	2019	Charge Em Up
"Pop My Shit" (Remix) (Lil Gotit featuring Lil Keed)	2019	Non-album single
"Trap Museum" (Young Scooter featuring Lil Keed)	2019	Trap Hero
Wave Flow (Lil Gotit featuring Lil Keed)	2019	Hood Fifty
"Blue Strips" (Shad Da God featuring Lil Keed)	2020	In God We Trust
"Groceries" (Landon Cube featuring Lil Keed)	2020	Non-album singles
"HEY!" (Lil Gnar featuring Lil Keed and Internet Money)	2021	Non-album singles
"Wifey" (Elle Teresa featuring Lil Keed)	2022	Sweet My Life
"I'm on It" (JP the Wavy & Bankroll Got It featuring Lil Keed)	2022	Bankroll Wavy
"TOKYO" (Ufo361 & Data Luv featuring Lil Keed)	2023	LOVE MY LIFE
“MOZZARELLA” (Yung Gravy and Lil Keed)	2024	Non-album singles

=== Other charted songs ===
Title	Year	Peak chart positions		Album
Title	Year	CAN	NZ Hot	Album
"Snake"	2019	95	24	Long Live Mexico

=== Guest appearances ===
List of non-single guest appearances, with other performing artists, showing year released and album name
Title	Year	Other artist(s)	Album
"Dirty Dancer"	2017	Lil Gotit	—N/a
"Dirty Dancer"	2018	Lil Gotit	—N/a
"All Season"	2018	Lil Gotit	—N/a
"Going Up"	2018	Young Thug	Slime Language
"Blood Diamonds"	2018	24Heavy, Mali Meexh	Safe Mode
"Heavy Metal"	2018	Lil Uzi Vert, Lil Gotit	—N/a
"Blue Slimes"	2018	Lil Gotit, Gunna, Skooly, Dolly White	Hood Baby
"Hell Yeah"	2018	Lil Gotit	Hood Baby
"Drop The Top"	2019	Lil Gotit	Crazy But It's True
"Runnin Bands"	2019	Lil Gotit	Crazy But It's True
"Double It"	2019	Luh Dino	Up 4 Life
"Wet Like A Boat"	2019	Lil Duke, Lil Yachty	Blue Devil 2
"Drip Babies"	2019	Hoodrich Pablo Juan, Lil Gotit	—N/a
"Undefeated"	2019	Future	—N/a
"Hot For Me"	2019	Jacquees, Lil Gotit	—N/a
"Big Tipper"	2019	Young Thug	So Much Fun
"Sauce"	2019	Kid Buu	Revenge Of The Clones
"Brotherly Love"	2019	Lil Gotit	The Real Goat
"Bankroll"	2019	88GLAM	Far From Heaven Close To God
"2500"	2019	J SidereaaK, KCamp, Cheeks Bossman	—N/a
"Accomplishments"	2019	Lil Yachty, Zaytoven	A-Team
"You Ain't Safe"	2020	Lil Yachty, Zaytoven, Lil Gotit	A-Team
"Hightop Shoes"	2020	Lil Yachty, Zaytoven	A-Team
"Rich"	2020	Flash G	—N/a
"Off-White"	2020	Lil Gotit	Hood Baby 2
"Drip Day N Night"	2020	Lil Gotit, Gunna	Hood Baby 2
"Yeah Yeah"	2020	Lil Gotit, Future	Hood Baby 2
"Range Rover Sports Truck"	2020	Lil Yachty	Lil Boat 3
"Booko Bucks"	2020	Nasty C, Lil Gotit	Zulu Man with Some Power
"Really Redd"	2020	Internet Money, Trippie Redd, Young Nudy	B4 the Storm
"Trains"	2020	Nav	Emergency Tsunami
"Warrior"	2021	YSL Records, T-Shyne, Big Sean	Slime Language 2
"Came Out"	2021	YSL Records, Gunna	Slime Language 2
"Get N Dere Gang"	2021	Lil Gotit, Yak Gotti	Top Chef Gotit
"Now We Getting Money"	2022	Lil Gotit, Lil PJ	The Cheater
"6 Figures"	2022	Lil Gotit, BIG30	The Cheater
"No Reason"	2022	Lil Gnar, Yak Gotti	Die Bout It
"I Put A"	2025	Young Thug	UY Scuti (Supernova Edition)
"Snakes on My Collar"	2026	YSL Records, Young Thug, Diamond*	Slime Language 3
