= Young Thug discography =

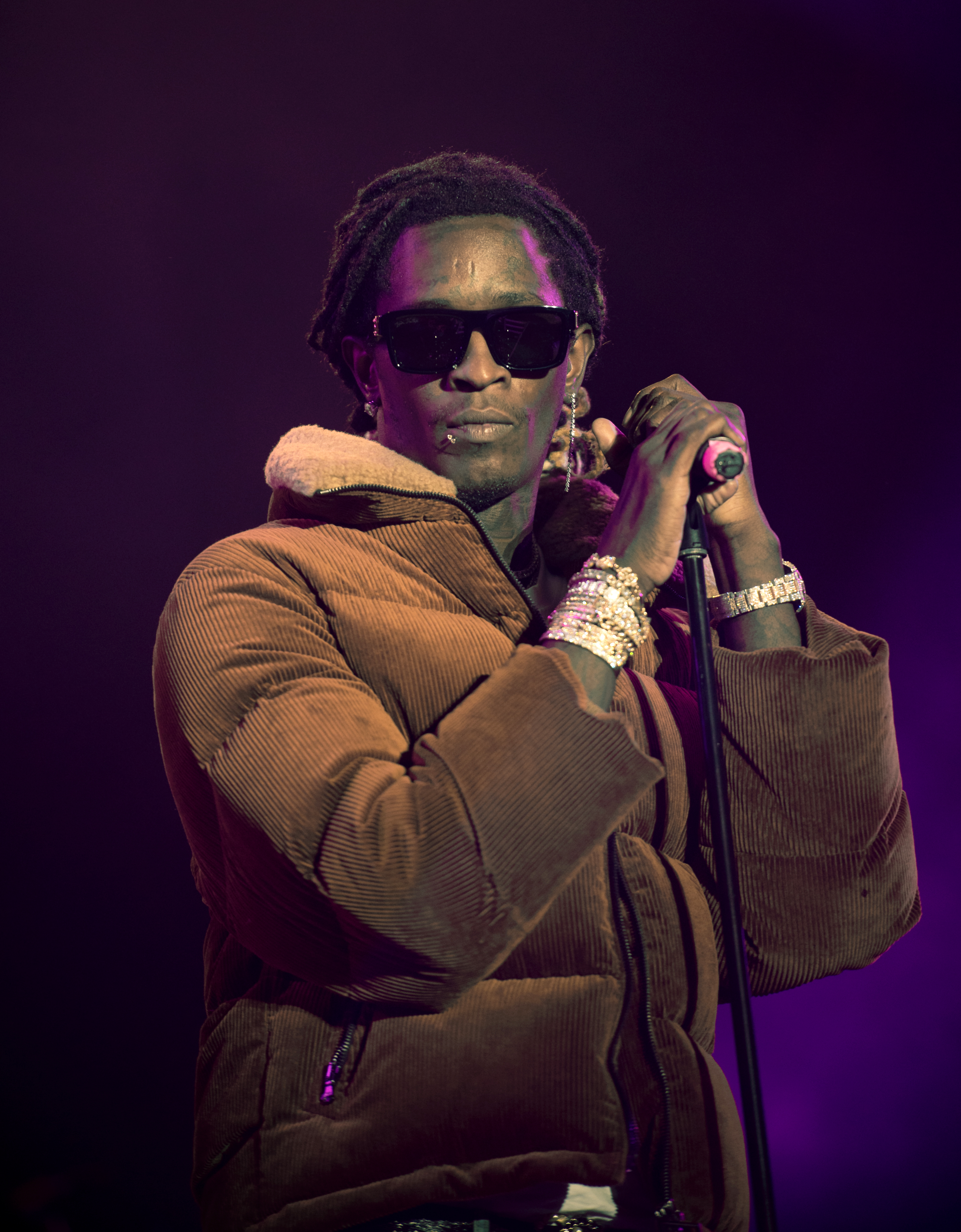
- Thug performing at Openair Frauenfeld in 2019
- Studio albums: 4
- EPs: 3
- Compilation albums: 2
- Singles: 97
- Music videos: 56
- Mixtapes: 12
- Commercial mixtapes: 7

The discography of American rapper Young Thug consists of four studio albums, two compilation albums, twelve self-released mixtapes, seven commercial mixtapes, three extended plays, and sixty-nine singles (including 71 as a featured artist).

In 2015, Thug released his debut commercial mixtape, Barter 6, which reached number 22 on the Billboard 200. His 2016 mixtape, I'm Up matched the same position. That same year, Thug saw an increase with his mixtape, Slime Season 3, which ascended to number seven. His final mixtape of the year, Jeffery, dropped down by one position at number eight. In 2017, his mixtape, Beautiful Thugger Girls, matched the same position. That same year, his collaborative mixtape with Future, Super Slimey reached number two on the Billboard 200. In 2018, Thug released his collaborative compilation album with his record label, YSL Records, Slime Language, which hit number eight. His second extended play, On the Rvn, was released later that year and fell back at number 17. Thug released his debut studio album, So Much Fun, in 2019, which debuted and peaked atop the Billboard 200, marking his first chart-topping album. In 2020, he released his collaborative mixtape with Chris Brown, Slime & B, which fell back at number 24. Thug released his collaborative compilation album with YSL and label signee Gunna, a sequel to Slime Language, in 2021, which marked his second number-one album on the Billboard 200. Later that year, he released his second studio album, Punk, which became his third number-one album and second consecutive number-one album. In 2023, his third studio album, Business is Business, was released while he was incarcerated due to an ongoing racketeering case that he was involved in. In 2025, after sustaining multiple delays, his fourth and comeback studio album "UY Scuti" was released.

Thug has earned three chart-topping singles on the Billboard Hot 100, all of which he is a featured artist on. In 2017, he earned his first number-one single from Camila Cabello's single, "Havana." He would later earn his second single that would reach the first position on the Hot 100 in 2020 from Travis Scott's single, "Franchise," which also features M.I.A. He earned his third chart-topping single from Drake's single, "Way 2 Sexy", which also features Future.

== Albums ==
=== Studio albums ===
List of studio albums, with selected details
Title	Album details	Peak chart positions										Certifications
Title	Album details	US	US Rap	AUS	BEL (FL)	CAN	FRA	IRE	NLD	NZ	UK	Certifications
So Much Fun	Released: August 16, 2019; Label: YSL, 300, Atlantic; Format: CD, LP, digital download, streaming	1	1	36	20	1	29	23	9	3	9	RIAA: Platinum; BPI: Gold; RMNZ: Platinum
Punk	Released: October 15, 2021; Label: YSL, 300, Atlantic; Format: CD, LP, cassette, digital download, streaming	1	1	26	29	3	37	38	18	15	22	
Business Is Business	Released: June 23, 2023; Label: YSL, 300, Atlantic; Format: CD, digital download, streaming	2	1	36	30	2	41	53	19	7	15	
UY Scuti	Released: September 26, 2025; Label: YSL, 300, Atlantic; Format: CD, LP, digital download, streaming	6	2	36	130	19	106	—	87	29	84	

=== Compilation albums ===
List of compilation albums, with selected details
Title	Album details	Peak chart positions							
Title	Album details	US	US Rap	BEL (FL)	CAN	FRA	NLD	NZ	UK
Slime Language (with YSL Records)	Released: August 17, 2018; Label: YSL, 300, Atlantic; Format: Digital download, streaming	8	8	111	11	—	46	—	88
Slime Language 2 (with YSL Records and Gunna)	Released: April 16, 2021; Label: YSL, 300, Atlantic; Format: CD,LP, digital download, streaming	1	1	19	2	40	6	14	—
Slime Language 3 (with YSL Records)	Released: August 28, 2026; Label: YSL, Create; Format: CD, digital download, streaming	146	—	—	—	—	—	—	—

== Mixtapes ==
=== Self-released mixtapes ===
List of self-released mixtapes with selected details
Title	Album details
I Came from Nothing	Released: June 8, 2011; Label: Self-released; Format: Digital download
I Came from Nothing 2	Released: December 20, 2011; Label: Self-released; Format: Digital download
I Came from Nothing 3	Released: July 4, 2012; Label: Self-released; Format: Digital download
1017 Thug	Released: February 23, 2013; Label: 1017; Format: Digital download
Black Portland (with Bloody Jay)	Released: January 21, 2014; Label: Self-released; Format: Digital download
Young Thugga Mane La Flare (with Gucci Mane)	Released: April 20, 2014; Label: 1017, 101; Format: Digital download
World War 3D: The Purple Album (Gucci Mane featuring Young Thug)	Released: June 16, 2014; Label: 1017, 101; Format: Digital download
1017 Thug 2	Released: July 11, 2014; Label: 1017, 101; Format: Digital download
1017 Thug 3: The Finale	Released: August 29, 2014; Label: 1017, 101; Format: Digital download
Rich Gang: The Tour, Part 1 (with Birdman and Rich Homie Quan, as Rich Gang)	Released: September 29, 2014; Label: Cash Money; Format: Digital download
Slime Season	Released: September 16, 2015 (Note: Re-released on streaming on December 25, 2024, through YSL Records and 300 Entertainment.); Label: Self-released; Format: Digital download
Slime Season 2	Released: October 31, 2015 (Note: Re-released on streaming on December 25, 2024, through YSL Records and 300 Entertainment.); Label: Self-released; Format: Digital download

=== Commercial mixtapes ===
List of commercial mixtapes, with selected chart positions.
Title	Album details	Peak chart positions										Certifications
Title	Album details	US	US R&B/ HH	US Rap	BEL (FL)	BEL (WA)	CAN	FRA	NLD	NZ	UK R&B	Certifications
Barter 6	Released: April 16, 2015; Label: 300, Atlantic; Format: LP, digital download	22	5	4	—	—	—	—	—	—	24	RIAA: Gold
I'm Up	Released: February 5, 2016; Label: 300, Atlantic; Format: Digital download	22	6	4	—	—	98	—	—	—	—	
Slime Season 3	Released: March 25, 2016; Label: 300, Atlantic; Format: Digital download	7	3	1	—	—	30	—	161	—	17	RIAA: Gold
Jeffery	Released: August 26, 2016; Label: 300, Atlantic; Format: LP, cassette, digital download	8	5	3	191	77	19	54	72	— (Note: Jeffery did not enter the NZ Top 40 Album Chart, but peaked at number five on the NZ Heatseekers Albums Chart.)	23	
Beautiful Thugger Girls	Released: June 16, 2017; Label: YSL, 300, Atlantic; Format: LP, digital download	8	4	4	—	—	34	—	—	37	71	RIAA: Gold; RMNZ: Gold
"—" denotes a recording that did not chart or was not released in that territory.

=== Collaborative mixtapes ===
List of collaborative mixtapes with selected chart positions
Title	Mixtape details	Peak chart positions										Certifications
Title	Mixtape details	US	US R&B/ HH	US Rap	BEL (FL)	BEL (WA)	CAN	FRA	NLD	NZ	UK	Certifications
Super Slimey (with Future)	Released: October 20, 2017; Label: YSL, 300, Atlantic, Freebandz, Epic; Format: Digital download	2	1	1	59	81	5	41	20	32	23	
Slime & B (with Chris Brown)	Released: May 5, 2020; Label: YSL, 300, Atlantic, CBE, RCA; Format: Digital download, streaming	24	15	—	156	161	46	139	51	—	51	RMNZ: Platinum
"—" denotes a recording that did not chart or was not released in that territory.

== Extended plays ==
Title	EP details	Peak chart positions	
Title	EP details	US	CAN
Young Martha (with Carnage and YSL Records)	Released: September 22, 2017; Labels: YSL, 300, Heavyweight; Format: Digital download	—	—
Hear No Evil	Released: April 13, 2018; Labels: YSL, 300, Atlantic; Format: Digital download	—	—
On the Rvn	Released: September 24, 2018; Labels: YSL, 300, Atlantic; Format: Digital download	17	27
"—" denotes a recording that did not chart or was not released in that territory.

== Singles ==
=== As lead artist ===
List of singles as lead artist, with selected chart positions, showing year released and album name
Title	Year	Peak chart positions										Certifications	Album
Title	Year	US	US R&B/HH	US Rap	AUS	CAN	FRA	IRE	NZ	UK	WW	Certifications	Album
"Stoner"	2014	47	13	4	—	—	—	—	—	—	—	RIAA: Gold	Non-album single
"2 Bitches"	2014	—	—	—	—	—	—	—	—	—	—		Non-album single
"Old English" (with A$AP Ferg and Freddie Gibbs)	2014	—	—	—	—	—	—	—	—	—	—	RIAA: Gold	Non-album single
"Check"	2015	100	30	23	—	—	—	—	—	—	—	RIAA: Platinum; BPI: Silver; MC: Gold	Barter 6
"Constantly Hating" (featuring Birdman)	2015	—	—	—	—	—	—	—	—	—	—		Barter 6
"Best Friend"	2015	45	9	7	—	—	—	—	—	—	—	RIAA: Platinum	Slime Season
"Fuck Cancer (Boosie)" (featuring Quavo)	2016	—	— (Note: "Fuck Cancer (Boosie)" did not enter the US Hot R&B/Hip-Hop Songs chart, but peaked at number five on the Bubbling Under R&B/Hip-Hop Singles chart.)	—	—	—	—	—	—	—	—		I'm Up
"Gangster Shit"	2016	—	— (Note: "Gangster Shit" did not enter the Hot R&B/Hip-Hop Songs chart, but peaked at number nine on the Bubbling Under R&B/Hip-Hop Singles chart.)	—	—	—	—	—	—	—	—		Non-album single
"Pick Up the Phone" (with Travis Scott featuring Quavo)	2016	43	12	7	—	62	95	—	— (Note: "Pick Up the Phone" did not enter the NZ Top 40 Singles Chart, but peaked at number seven on the NZ Heatseeker Singles Chart.)	181	—	RIAA: 5× Platinum; BPI: Platinum; MC: 3× Platinum; RMNZ: 3× Platinum	Jeffery and Birds in the Trap Sing McKnight
"Wyclef Jean"	2017	87	32	—	—	96	—	—	—	—	—	RIAA: Platinum; MC: Platinum; RMNZ: Gold	Jeffery
"Gang Up" (with 2 Chainz, Wiz Khalifa and PnB Rock)	2017	— (Note: "Gang Up" did not enter the Billboard Hot 100, but peaked at number 13 on the Bubbling Under Hot 100 chart.)	— (Note: "Gang Up" did not enter the Hot R&B/Hip-Hop Songs chart, but peaked at number four on the Bubbling Under R&B/Hip-Hop Singles chart.)	—	118	—	64	—	—	—	—	RIAA: Gold	The Fate of the Furious: The Album
"Homie" (with Carnage featuring Meek Mill)	2017	—	—	—	—	—	—	—	—	—	—		Young Martha
"Liger" (with Carnage)	2017	—	—	—	—	—	—	—	—	—	—		Young Martha
"Patek Water" (with Future featuring Offset)	2017	50	17	12	—	39	—	—	—	—	—	RIAA: Gold	Super Slimey
"Lil One" (with Birdman)	2018	—	—	—	—	—	—	—	—	—	—		Non-album single
"Anybody" (featuring Nicki Minaj)	2018	89	43	—	—	99	—	—	—	—	—	RIAA: Gold	Hear No Evil
"The London" (featuring J. Cole and Travis Scott)	2019	12	6	5	17	6	103	19	8	18	—	RIAA: 3× Platinum; ARIA: Platinum; BPI: Platinum; MC: 2× Platinum; RMNZ: 2× Platinum	So Much Fun
"Hot" (featuring Gunna or remix also featuring Travis Scott)	2019	11	5	3	49	18	119	44	40	52	—	RIAA: Platinum; ARIA: Gold; BPI: Gold; MC: Gold; RMNZ: 2× Platinum	So Much Fun
"Quarantine Clean" (with Turbo and Gunna)	2020	—	—	—	—	—	—	—	—	—	—		Non-album single
"Go Crazy" (with Chris Brown)	2020	3	1	—	9	41	—	26	2	10	26	RIAA: 3× Platinum; BPI: Platinum; ARIA: 2× Platinum; RMNZ: 6× Platinum	Slime & B
"Say You Love Me" (with Chris Brown)	2020	—	—	—	—	—	—	—	—	—	—		Slime & B
"Stay Down" (with Lil Durk and 6lack)	2020	73	26	21	—	94	—	—	—	—	154	RIAA: Gold	The Voice
"Take It to Trial" (with YSL Records and Gunna featuring Yak Gotti)	2020	— (Note: "Take It to Trial" did not enter the Billboard Hot 100, but peaked at number two on the Bubbling Under Hot 100 chart.)	33	—	—	—	—	—	— (Note: "Take It to Trial" did not enter the NZ Top 40 Singles Chart, but peaked at number 18 on the NZ Hot Singles Chart.)	—	—		Slime Language 2
"Bad Boy" (with Juice Wrld)	2021	22	9	7	55	13	—	26	— (Note: "Bad Boy" did not enter the NZ Top 40 Singles Chart, but peaked at number three on the NZ Hot Singles Chart.)	31	19	MC: Gold	Non-album single
"That Go!" (with YSL Records and Meek Mill featuring T-Shyne)	2021	— (Note: "That Go!" did not enter the Billboard Hot 100, but peaked at number nine on the Bubbling Under Hot 100 chart.)	43	—	—	—	—	—	—	—	—	RIAA: Gold	Slime Language 2 and Confetti Nights
"Better Believe" (with Belly and the Weeknd)	2021	88	31	25	—	23	—	—	—	—	79		See You Next Wednesday
"Tick Tock"	2021	96	37	—	—	—	—	—	— (Note: "Tick Tock" did not enter the NZ Top 40 Singles Chart, but peaked at number 34 on the NZ Hot Singles Chart.)	—	196		Non-album single
"Bubbly" (with Drake and Travis Scott)	2021	20	7	5	88	22	—	64	— (Note: "Bubbly" did not enter the NZ Top 40 Singles Chart, but peaked at number five on the NZ Hot Singles Chart.)	60	25		Punk
"Potion" (with Calvin Harris and Dua Lipa)	2022	71	—	—	32	31	99	9	35	16	30	RIAA: Gold; ARIA: Gold; BPI: Silver; RMNZ: Gold	Funk Wav Bounces Vol. 2
"My Wrist" (with Yeat)	2023	— (Note: "My Wrist" did not enter the Billboard Hot 100, but peaked at number six on the Bubbling Under Hot 100 chart.)	46	—	—	—	—	—	— (Note: "My Wrist" did not enter the NZ Top 40 Singles Chart, but peaked at number eight on the NZ Hot Singles Chart.)	—	—		Non-album single
"Oh U Went" (featuring Drake)	2023	19	9	5	—	20	—	—	5	65	35		Business Is Business
"From a Man"	2023	—	—	—	—	—	—	—	—	—	—		Non-album single
"Lightyears" (with Juice Wrld)	2024	— (Note: "Lightyears" did not enter the Billboard Hot 100, but peaked at number 25 on the Bubbling Under Hot 100 chart.)	37	—	—	—	—	—	— (Note: "Lightyears" did not enter the NZ Top 40 Singles Chart, but peaked at number 19 on the NZ Hot Singles Chart.)	—	—		The Pre-Party
"Money on Money" (featuring Future)	2025	39	10	7	—	62	—	—	— (Note: "Money on Money" did not enter the NZ Top 40 Singles Chart, but peaked at number 4 on the NZ Hot Singles Chart.)	—	71		UY Scuti
"Miss My Dogs"	2025	—	—	—	—	—	—	—	—	—	—		UY Scuti
"Trimski" (with Nav)	2026	—	—	—	—	—	—	—	—	—	—		Non-album single
"Ashin' the Blunt" (with 6lack)	2026	—	—	—	—	—	—	— (Note: "Ashin' the Blunt" did not enter the NZ Top 40 Singles Chart, but peaked at number 37 on the NZ Hot Singles Chart.)	—	—	—		Love Is the New Gangsta
"Woah" (with Nav)	2026	—	—	—	—	—	—	—	—	—	—		Non-album single
"—" denotes a recording that did not chart or was not released in that territory.

=== As featured artist ===
List of singles as featured artist, with selected chart positions, showing year released and album name
Title	Year	Peak chart positions										Certifications	Album
Title	Year	US	US R&B/HH	US Rap	AUS	CAN	FRA	IRE	NZ	UK	WW	Certifications	Album
"Whip Dat D'nope" (Trapboy Freddy and Richboy Lex featuring Young Thug)	2014	—	—	—	—	—	—	—	—	—	—		Non-album single
"Cash Talk" (Figg Panamera featuring Young Thug and Offset)	2014	—	—	—	—	—	—	—	—	—	—		The Independent Game
"Fly Talk" (Seven Montana featuring Young Thug)	2014	—	—	—	—	—	—	—	—	—	—		Non-album singles
"Hookah" (Tyga featuring Young Thug)	2014	85	26	19	—	—	—	—	—	—	—	RIAA: Platinum; BPI: Silver; RMNZ: Gold	Non-album singles
"Try Me" (Trae Tha Truth featuring Young Thug)	2014	—	—	—	—	—	—	—	—	—	—		Non-album singles
"Main Chic" (YC featuring Young Thug and Cassius Jay)	2014	—	—	—	—	—	—	—	—	—	—		Non-album singles
"Know Bout Me" (Peewee Longway featuring Young Thug and Offset)	2014	—	—	—	—	—	—	—	—	—	—		Non-album singles
"About the Money" (T.I. featuring Young Thug)	2014	42	12	9	—	—	—	—	—	—	—	RIAA: Gold; RMNZ: Gold	Paperwork
"This Summer" (The Rock Mob featuring Young Thug)	2014	—	—	—	—	—	—	—	—	—	—		Non-album single
"100's & 50's" (Extream Bling featuring Young Thug)	2014	—	—	—	—	—	—	—	—	—	—		Show and Prove 2
"Lifestyle" (Rich Gang featuring Young Thug and Rich Homie Quan)	2014	16	4	3	—	—	—	—	—	—	—	RIAA: Platinum; BPI: Silver; RMNZ: Platinum	Non-album single
"Panoramic Roof" (Gucci Mane featuring Young Thug)	2014	—	—	—	—	—	—	—	—	—	—		The Purple Album
"Okay Okay" (Yung Booke featuring Young Thug)	2014	—	—	—	—	—	—	—	—	—	—		City on My Back
"Low" (Juicy J featuring Nicki Minaj, Lil Bibby and Young Thug)	2014	—	46	—	—	—	—	—	—	—	—		Non-album single
"Right Back" (DJ Drama featuring Jeezy, Young Thug and Rich Homie Quan)	2014	—	—	—	—	—	—	—	—	—	—		Quality Street Music 2
"Take Kare" (Rich Gang featuring Young Thug and Lil Wayne)	2014	—	—	—	—	—	—	—	—	—	—		Non-album single
"Throw Sum Mo" (Rae Sremmurd featuring Nicki Minaj and Young Thug)	2014	30	12	6	—	—	—	—	—	—	—	RIAA: 2× Platinum; RMNZ: Gold	SremmLife
"Mamacita" (Travis Scott featuring Rich Homie Quan and Young Thug)	2014	— (Note: "Mamacita" did not enter the Billboard Hot 100, but peaked at number nine on the Bubbling Under Hot 100 Singles chart.)	26	22	—	—	—	—	— (Note: "Mamacita" did not enter the NZ Top 40 Singles Chart, but peaked at number 15 on the NZ Hot Singles Chart.)	—	—	RIAA: Platinum; MC: Platinum	Days Before Rodeo
"I Know There's Gonna Be (Good Times)" (Jamie xx featuring Young Thug and Popcaan)	2015	—	—	—	90	—	—	—	—	115	—	RIAA: Gold; BPI: Gold; RMNZ: Gold	In Colour
"Rihanna" (Yo Gotti featuring Young Thug)	2015	—	—	—	—	—	—	—	—	—	—		Non-album singles
"Nun for Free" (Zonnique featuring Young Thug)	2015	—	—	—	—	—	—	—	—	—	—		Non-album singles
"Party Favors" (Tinashe featuring Young Thug)	2015	—	—	—	—	—	—	—	—	—	—		Non-album singles
"Minnesota" (Lil Yachty featuring Quavo, Skippa Da Flippa and Young Thug)	2016	— (Note: "Minnesota" did not enter the US Billboard Hot 100, but peaked at number 21 on the Bubbling Under Hot 100 Singles chart.)	— (Note: "Minnesota" did not enter the Hot R&B/Hip-Hop Songs chart, but peaked at number three on the Bubbling Under R&B/Hip-Hop Singles chart.)	—	—	—	—	—	—	—	—	RIAA: Gold	Lil Boat
"Slugs" (Trae tha Truth featuring Young Thug)	2016	—	—	—	—	—	—	—	—	—	—		Tha Truth, Pt. 2
"No Limit" (Usher featuring Young Thug)	2016	32	9	—	—	—	—	—	—	—	—	ARIA: Gold; RMNZ: Gold	Hard II Love
"Guwop Home" (Gucci Mane featuring Young Thug)	2016	— (Note: "Guwop Home" did not enter the Billboard Hot 100, but peaked at number 23 on the Bubbling Under Hot 100 Singles chart.)	— (Note: "Guwop Home" did not enter the Hot R&B/Hip-Hop Songs chart, but peaked at number one on the Bubbling Under R&B/Hip-Hop Singles chart.)	—	—	—	—	—	—	—	—		Everybody Looking
"Been Thru a Lot" (TM88 featuring Young Thug and Lil Yachty)	2016	—	—	—	—	—	—	—	—	—	—		Non-album single
"Spend It" (Remix) (Dae Dae featuring Young Thug and Young M.A)	2016	—	—	—	—	—	—	—	—	—	—		Non-album single
"I Swear" (Wyclef Jean featuring Young Thug)	2016	—	—	—	—	—	—	—	—	—	—		J'ouvert
"The Half" (DJ Snake featuring Jeremih, Young Thug and Swizz Beatz)	2017	—	—	—	—	—	—	—	—	—	—	RMNZ: Gold	Encore
"Trap Trap Trap" (Rick Ross featuring Young Thug and Wale)	2017	97	— (Note: "Trap Trap Trap" did not enter the Hot R&B/Hip-Hop Songs chart, but peaked at number six on the Bubbling Under R&B/Hip-Hop Singles chart.)	—	—	—	—	—	—	—	—		Rather You Than Me
"Heatstroke" (Calvin Harris featuring Young Thug, Pharrell Williams and Ariana Grande)	2017	96	—	—	23	53	107	33	—	25	—	RIAA: Gold; ARIA: Platinum; BPI: Silver; RMNZ: Platinum	Funk Wav Bounces Vol. 1
"Bit Bak" (Rich Gang featuring Young Thug and Birdman)	2017	—	—	—	—	—	—	—	—	—	—		Non-album singles
"Get Mine" (Bryson Tiller featuring Young Thug)	2017	— (Note: "Get Mine" did not enter the Billboard Hot 100, but peaked at number nine on the Bubbling Under Hot 100 Singles chart.)	50	—	—	—	—	—	—	—	—		Non-album singles
"Move Like The Mob" (Zoey Dollaz featuring Young Thug and Lil Durk)	2017	—	—	—	—	—	—	—	—	—	—		Non-album singles
"Havana" (Camila Cabello featuring Young Thug)	2017	1	—	—	1	1	1	1	2	1	—	RIAA: Diamond; ARIA: 10× Platinum; BEA: 2× Platinum; BPI: 5× Platinum; BVMI: 2× Platinum; FIMI: 4× Platinum; GLF: 4× Platinum; MC: 9× Platinum; RMNZ: 7× Platinum	Camila
"High End" (Chris Brown featuring Future and Young Thug)	2017	82	32	—	—	57	93	—	—	71	—	RIAA: Gold	Heartbreak on a Full Moon
"Ride for Me" (A-Trak and Falcons featuring Young Thug and 24hrs)	2018	—	—	—	—	—	—	—	—	—	—		Non-album single
"Studio" (Jacquees featuring Young Thug)	2018	—	—	—	—	—	—	—	—	—	—		4275
"25 Soldiers" (Swizz Beatz featuring Young Thug)	2018	—	—	—	—	—	—	—	—	—	—		Poison
"The Weekend" (T.I. featuring Young Thug)	2018	—	—	—	—	—	—	—	—	—	—		Dime Trap
"Fetish" (Lil Keed featuring Young Thug)	2018	—	—	—	—	—	—	—	—	—	—		Non-album single
"Proud of Me" (Lil Keed featuring Young Thug)	2019	—	—	—	—	—	—	—	—	—	—		Long Live Mexico
"Goodbyes" (Post Malone featuring Young Thug)	2019	3	2	2	5	5	47	4	5	5	—	RIAA: 3× Platinum; ARIA: 6× Platinum; BPI: Platinum; MC: 7× Platinum; RMNZ: 3× Platinum	Hollywood's Bleeding
"Old Town Road" (Remix) (Lil Nas X featuring Billy Ray Cyrus, Young Thug and Mason Ramsey)	2019	—	—	—	—	—	—	—	—	—	—		Non-album singles
"Verify" (Jacquees featuring Young Thug and Gunna)	2019	—	—	—	—	—	—	—	—	—	—		King of R&B
"Chariot" (Calboy featuring Lil Durk, Meek Mill and Young Thug)	2019	—	— (Note: "Chariot" did not chart on the Hot R&B/Hip-Hop Songs chart, but did peak at number two on the Bubbling Under Hot R&B/Hip-Hop Singles chart.)	—	—	—	—	—	—	—	—	RIAA: Gold	Wildboy
"Move (Skippa da Flippa featuring Young Thug)	2019	—	—	—	—	—	—	—	—	—	—		Non-album singles
"IDKW" (Rvssian, Shenseea and Swae Lee featuring Young Thug)	2020	—	—	—	—	—	—	—	—	—	—		Non-album singles
"Yell Oh" (Trippie Redd featuring Young Thug)	2020	—	—	—	—	—	—	—	—	—	—		A Love Letter to You 4 (Deluxe)
"Give No Fxk" (Migos featuring Travis Scott and Young Thug)	2020	48	19	13	—	60	164	78	— (Note: "Give No Fxk" did not enter the NZ Top 40 Singles Chart, but peaked at number thirteen on the NZ Heatseekers chart.)	96	—		Non-album single
"Out West" (JackBoys and Travis Scott featuring Young Thug)	2020	38	15	12	79	29	117	69	— (Note: "Out West" did not enter the NZ Top 40 Singles Chart, but peaked at number three on the NZ Hot Singles Chart.)	—	—	RIAA: 3× Platinum; MC: Platinum; BPI: Silver; RMNZ: Platinum	JackBoys
"Bullets with Names" (Machine Gun Kelly featuring Young Thug, RJmrLA and Lil Duke)	2020	—	—	—	—	—	—	—	—	—	—		Hotel Diablo: Floor 13 Edition
"Headlocc" (Yella Beezy featuring Young Thug)	2020	—	—	—	—	—	—	—	—	—	—		Non-album singles
"Cheat Code Mode" (Nieman J, Eric Bellinger and Joe Moses featuring Young Thug)	2020	—	—	—	—	—	—	—	—	—	—		Non-album singles
"Moncler" (T-Shyne featuring Young Thug)	2020	—	—	—	—	—	—	—	—	—	—		Non-album singles
"Blue Jean Bandit" (TM88, Southside and Moneybagg Yo featuring Young Thug and Future)	2020	—	—	—	—	—	—	—	—	—	—		Non-album singles
"Compensating" (Aminé featuring Young Thug)	2020	—	—	—	—	—	—	—	—	—	—		Limbo
"Dollaz on My Head" (Gunna featuring Young Thug)	2020	38	15	—	—	53	—	—	— (Note: "Dollaz on My Head" did not enter the NZ Top 40 Singles Chart, but peaked at number eight on the NZ Heatseekers chart.)	—	—	RIAA: Platinum; RMNZ: Platinum	Wunna
"Yacht Club" (Strick featuring Young Thug and Ty Dolla Sign)	2020	—	—	—	—	—	—	—	—	—	—		Strick Land
"Blind" (DaBaby featuring Young Thug)	2020	78	31	—	—	82	—	—	— (Note: "Dollaz on My Head" did not enter the NZ Top 40 Singles Chart, but peaked at number nine on the NZ Heatseekers chart.)	—	—	RIAA: Gold; RMNZ: Gold	Blame It on Baby (Deluxe)
"Ring" (T.I. featuring Young Thug)	2020	— (Note: "Ring" did not enter the Billboard Hot 100, but peaked at number seventeen on the Bubbling Under Hot 100 Singles chart.)	—	—	—	—	—	—	—	—	—		The L.I.B.R.A.
"Mismatch" (The Remix) (Bino Rideaux featuring Young Thug)	2020	—	—	—	—	—	—	—	—	—	—		Non-album singles
"Franchise" (Travis Scott featuring Young Thug and M.I.A.)	2020	1	1	1	31	16	—	23	37	26	7	RIAA: 2× Platinum; BPI: Silver; MC: Gold; RMNZ: Gold	Non-album singles
"Don't Stop" (Megan Thee Stallion featuring Young Thug)	2020	30	14	13	—	97	—	—	— (Note: "Don't Stop" did not enter the NZ Top 40 Singles Chart, but peaked at number twenty-eight on the NZ Heatseekers chart.)	—	—	RIAA: Platinum	Good News
"Jimmy Choo" (Karlae featuring Young Thug and Gunna)	2020	—	—	—	—	—	—	—	—	—	—		Non-album single
"Talk About Love" (Zara Larsson featuring Young Thug)	2021	—	—	—	—	—	—	—	— (Note: "Talk About Love" did not enter the NZ Top 40 Singles Chart, but peaked at number eighteen on the NZ Heatseekers chart.)	—	—		Poster Girl
"Blue Emerald" (Rich Gang featuring Young Thug)	2021	—	—	—	—	—	—	—	—	—	—		Non-album single
"Way 2 Sexy" (Drake featuring Future and Young Thug)	2021	1	1	1	7	3	28	15	7	11	2	ARIA: Platinum; BPI: Gold; RMNZ: Platinum	Certified Lover Boy
"Run" (Killer Mike featuring Young Thug & Dave Chapelle)	2023	—	—	—	—	—	—	—	—	—	—		Michael
"Ok!" (Busta Rhymes featuring Cool & Dre & Young Thug)	2023	—	—	—	—	—	—	—	—	—	—		Blockbusta
"Bless" (Lil Wayne & Wheezy featuring Young Thug)	2024	—	—	—	—	—	—	—	—	—	—		Non-album single
"Poetry" (Maino featuring Young Thug)	2024	—	—	—	—	—	—	—	—	—	—		This Life Forever
"Kisses Make Sure" (Strick and James Blake featuring Young Thug)	2024	—	—	—	—	—	—	—	—	—	—		All Time High
"—" denotes a recording that did not chart or was not released in that territory.

== Other charted and certified songs ==
List of songs, with selected chart positions, showing year released and album name
Title	Year	Peak chart positions									Certifications	Album
Title	Year	US	US R&B/HH	CAN	GER	IRE	NLD	NZ	UK	WW	Certifications	Album
"Get TF Out My Face" (Rich Homie Quan featuring Young Thug)	2014	—	— (Note: "Get TF Out My Face" did not enter the Hot R&B/Hip-Hop Songs chart, but peaked at number three on the Bubbling Under R&B/Hip-Hop Singles chart.)	—	—	—	—	—	—	—		I Promise I Will Never Stop Going In
"Skyfall" (Travis Scott featuring Young Thug)	2014	— (Note: "Skyfall" did not enter the Billboard Hot 100, but peaked at number 12 on the Bubbling Under Hot 100 chart.)	28	—	—	—	—	—	—	—		Days Before Rodeo
"With That" (featuring Duke)	2015	—	— (Note: "With That" did not enter the Hot R&B/Hip-Hop Songs chart, but peaked at number one on the Bubbling Under R&B/Hip-Hop Singles chart.)	—	—	—	—	—	—	—	RIAA: Gold	Barter 6
"Constantly Hating" (featuring Birdman)	2015	—	— (Note: "Constantly Hating" did not enter the Hot R&B/Hip-Hop Songs chart, but peaked at number five on the Bubbling Under R&B/Hip-Hop Singles chart.)	—	—	—	—	—	—	—		Barter 6
"Maria I'm Drunk" (Travis Scott featuring Justin Bieber and Young Thug)	2015	—	—	—	—	—	—	—	—	—	RIAA: Platinum; RMNZ: Gold	Rodeo
"Hercules"	2016	—	— (Note: "Hercules" did not enter the Hot R&B/Hip-Hop Songs chart, but peaked at number three on the Bubbling Under R&B/Hip-Hop Singles chart.)	—	—	—	—	—	—	—	RIAA: Gold	I'm Up
"Highlights" (Kanye West featuring Young Thug)	2016	— (Note: "Highlights" did not enter the Billboard Hot 100, but peaked at number four on the Bubbling Under Hot 100 Singles chart.)	41	—	—	—	—	—	—	—		The Life of Pablo
"Drippin'"	2016	—	— (Note: "Drippin'" did not enter the Hot R&B/Hip-Hop Songs chart, but peaked at number six on the Bubbling Under R&B/Hip-Hop Singles chart.)	—	—	—	—	—	—	—		Slime Season 3
"Digits"	2016	93	29	—	—	—	—	—	—	—	RIAA: 2× Platinum; BPI: Silver; MC: Platinum; RMNZ: Gold	Slime Season 3
"With Them"	2016	87	26	—	—	—	—	—	—	—	RIAA: Gold	Slime Season 3
"Memo"	2016	— (Note: "Memo" did not enter the Billboard Hot 100 but peaked at number 24 on the Bubbling Under Hot 100 Singles Charts.)	42	—	—	—	—	—	—	—		Slime Season 3
"Slime Shit" (featuring Yak Gotti, Duke and Peewee Roscoe)	2016	—	— (Note: "Slime Shit" did not enter the Hot R&B/Hip-Hop Songs chart, but peaked at number three on the Bubbling Under R&B/Hip-Hop Singles chart.)	—	—	—	—	—	—	—		Slime Season 3
"Worth It"	2016	—	— (Note: "Worth It" did not enter the Hot R&B/Hip-Hop Songs chart, but peaked at number five on the Bubbling Under R&B/Hip-Hop Singles chart.)	—	—	—	—	—	—	—		Slime Season 3
"Tattoos"	2016	—	— (Note: "Tattoos" did not enter the Hot R&B/Hip-Hop Songs chart, but peaked at number 10 on the Bubbling Under R&B/Hip-Hop Singles chart.)	—	—	—	—	—	—	—		Slime Season 3
"Problem"	2016	—	— (Note: "Problem" did not enter the Hot R&B/Hip-Hop Songs chart, but peaked at number nine on the Bubbling Under R&B/Hip-Hop Singles chart.)	—	—	—	—	—	—	—		Slime Season 3
"Mixtape" (Chance the Rapper featuring Young Thug and Lil Yachty)	2016	— (Note: "Mixtape" did not enter the Billboard Hot 100, but peaked at number 10 on the Bubbling Under Hot 100 Singles chart.)	49	—	—	—	—	—	—	—	RIAA: Gold	Coloring Book
"Floyd Mayweather" (featuring Travis Scott, Gucci Mane and Gunna)	2016	— (Note: "Floyd Mayweather" did not enter the Billboard Hot 100, but peaked at number four on the Bubbling Under Hot 100 Singles chart.)	41	—	—	—	—	—	—	—		Jeffery
"Future Swag"	2016	—	— (Note: "Floyd Mayweather" did not enter the Hot R&B/Hip-Hop Songs chart, but peaked at number one on the Bubbling Under R&B/Hip-Hop Singles chart.)	—	—	—	—	—	—	—		Jeffery
"RiRi"	2016	—	— (Note: "RiRi" did not enter the Hot R&B/Hip-Hop Songs chart, but peaked at number five on the Bubbling Under R&B/Hip-Hop Singles chart.)	—	—	—	—	—	—	—		Jeffery
"Guwop" (featuring Quavo, Offset and Young Scooter)	2016	— (Note: "Guwop" did not enter the Billboard Hot 100, but peaked at number 10 on the Bubbling Under Hot 100 Singles chart.)	45	—	—	—	—	—	—	—	RIAA: Platinum; MC: Gold	Jeffery
"Harambe"	2016	— (Note: "Harambe" did not enter the Billboard Hot 100, but peaked at number six on the Bubbling Under Hot 100 Singles chart.)	44	—	—	—	—	—	—	—		Jeffery
"Offended" (Meek Mill featuring Young Thug and 21 Savage)	2016	70	29	100	—	—	—	—	—	—		DC4
"Sacrifices" (Drake featuring 2 Chainz and Young Thug)	2017	36	19	26	—	—	—	—	—	—	ARIA: Gold; BPI: Silver	More Life
"Ice Melts" (Drake featuring Young Thug)	2017	62	37	48	—	—	—	—	—	—	BPI: Silver	More Life
"Relationship" (featuring Future)	2017	65	26	26	—	—	—	—	—	—	RIAA: 2× Platinum; BPI: Silver; MC: 2× Platinum; RMNZ: Platinum	Beautiful Thugger Girls
"We Ball" (Meek Mill featuring Young Thug)	2017	96	39	—	—	—	—	—	—	—		Wins and Losses
"No Cap" (with Future)	2017	62	25	77	—	—	—	—	—	—	RIAA: Gold	Super Slimey
"All da Smoke" (with Future)	2017	77	31	99	—	—	—	—	—	—	RIAA: Gold	Super Slimey
"Three" (with Future)	2017	100	41	—	—	—	—	—	—	—		Super Slimey
"Cruise Ship"	2017	— (Note: "Cruise Ship" did not enter the Billboard Hot 100, but peaked at number one on the Bubbling Under Hot 100 Singles chart.)	42	—	—	—	—	—	—	—		Super Slimey
"Drip on Me" (with Future)	2017	— (Note: "Drip on Me" did not enter the Billboard Hot 100, but peaked at number two on the Bubbling Under Hot 100 Singles chart.)	43	—	—	—	—	—	—	—		Super Slimey
"200" (with Future)	2017	— (Note: "200" did not enter the Billboard Hot 100, but peaked at number three on the Bubbling Under Hot 100 Singles chart.)	44	—	—	—	—	—	—	—		Super Slimey
"Killed Before"	2017	— (Note: "Killed Before" did not enter the Billboard Hot 100, but peaked at number four on the Bubbling Under Hot 100 Singles chart.)	46	—	—	—	—	—	—	—		Super Slimey
"Real Love" (with Future)	2017	— (Note: "Real Love" did not enter the Billboard Hot 100, but peaked at number five on the Bubbling Under Hot 100 Singles chart.)	48	—	—	—	—	—	—	—		Super Slimey
"Mink Flow" (with Future)	2017	— (Note: "Mink Flow" did not enter the Billboard Hot 100, but peaked at number 12 on the Bubbling Under Hot 100 Singles chart.)	— (Note: "Mink Flow" did not enter the Hot R&B/Hip-Hop Songs chart, but peaked at number two on the Bubbling Under R&B/Hip-Hop Singles chart.)	—	—	—	—	—	—	—		Super Slimey
"Group Home" (with Future)	2017	— (Note: "Group Home" did not enter the Billboard Hot 100, but peaked at number 21 on the Bubbling Under Hot 100 chart.)	— (Note: "Group Home" did not enter the Hot R&B/Hip-Hop Songs chart, but peaked at number six on the Bubbling Under R&B/Hip-Hop Singles chart.)	—	—	—	—	—	—	—		Super Slimey
"Rondo" (6ix9ine featuring Tory Lanez and Young Thug)	2018	73	38	53	—	—	—	—	—	—		Day69
"Forever Ever" (Trippie Redd featuring Young Thug and Reese Laflare)	2018	— (Note: "Forever Ever" did not enter the Billboard Hot 100, but peaked at number 13 on the Bubbling Under Hot 100 chart.)	—	—	—	—	—	—	—	—	RIAA: Gold; BPI: Silver; RMNZ: Gold	Life's a Trip
"Chanel (Go Get It)" (featuring Gunna and Lil Baby)	2018	78	31	92	—	—	—	—	—	—	RIAA: Platinum; BPI: Silver; MC: Platinum; RMNZ: Gold	Slime Language
"It's a Slime" (featuring Lil Uzi Vert)	2018	— (Note: "It's a Slime" did not enter the Billboard Hot 100, but peaked at number 12 on the Bubbling Under Hot 100 chart.)	—	—	—	—	—	—	—			Slime Language
"On the Run"	2018	— (Note: "On the Run" did not enter the Billboard Hot 100, but peaked at number 11 on the Bubbling Under Hot 100 chart.)	— (Note: "On the Run" did not enter the Hot R&B/Hip-Hop Songs chart, but peaked at number two on the Bubbling Under R&B/Hip-Hop Singles chart.)	—	—	—	—	—	—	—		On the Rvn
"Climax" (featuring 6lack)	2018	— (Note: "Climax" did not enter the Billboard Hot 100, but peaked at number 20 on the Bubbling Under Hot 100 chart.)	— (Note: "Climax" did not enter the Hot R&B/Hip-Hop Songs chart, but peaked at number seven on the Bubbling Under R&B/Hip-Hop Singles chart.)	—	—	—	—	—	—	—		On the Rvn
"Sin" (featuring Jaden Smith)	2018	— (Note: "Sin" did not enter the Billboard Hot 100, but peaked at number three on the Bubbling Under Hot 100 chart.)	48	95	—	—	—	—	—	—	RIAA: Gold; MC: Gold	On the Rvn
"High" (featuring Elton John)	2018	— (Note: "High" did not enter the Billboard Hot 100, but peaked at number two on the Bubbling Under Hot 100 chart.)	— (Note: "High" did not enter the Hot R&B/Hip-Hop Songs chart, but peaked at number one on the Bubbling Under R&B/Hip-Hop Singles chart.)	—	—	—	—	—	—	—		On the Rvn
"Red Bentley" (Future and Juice Wrld featuring Young Thug)	2018	— (Note: "Red Bentley" did not enter the Billboard Hot 100, but peaked at number one on the Billboard Bubbling Under Hot 100 chart.)	50	—	—	—	—	—	—	—		Wrld on Drugs
"Up to Something" (Metro Boomin featuring Travis Scott and Young Thug)	2018	100	—	—	—	—	—	—	—	—		Not All Heroes Wear Capes
"Lesbian" (Metro Boomin featuring Gunna and Young Thug)	2018	— (Note: "Lesbian" did not enter the Billboard Hot 100, but peaked at number four on the Bubbling Under Hot 100 chart.)	—	—	—	—	—	—	—	—	MC: Gold	Not All Heroes Wear Capes
"Just Like Me" (A Boogie wit da Hoodie featuring Young Thug)	2018	—	—	—	—	—	—	—	—	—	RIAA: Platinum	Hoodie SZN
"On God" (Juice Wrld featuring Young Thug)	2019	— (Note: "On God" did not enter the Billboard Hot 100, but peaked at number 12 on the Billboard Bubbling Under Hot 100 chart.)	— (Note: "On God" did not enter the Billboard Hot 100, but peaked at number four on the Billboard Bubbling Under R&B/Hip-Hop chart.)	—	—	—	—	—	—	—	RIAA: Gold	Death Race for Love
"3 Headed Snake" (Gunna featuring Young Thug)	2019	74	35	—	—	—	—	40	—	—	RIAA: Gold	Drip or Drown 2
"Feels" (Ed Sheeran featuring Young Thug and J Hus)	2019	—	—	77	—	—	—	—	—	—	BPI: Silver	No.6 Collaborations Project
"Just How It Is"	2019	60	23	—	—	—	—	— (Note: "Just How It Is" did not enter the NZ Top 40 Singles Chart, but peaked at number 18 on the NZ Hot Singles Chart.)	—	—		So Much Fun
"Sup Mate" (featuring Future)	2019	70	29	—	—	—	—	—	—	—		So Much Fun
"Ecstasy" (featuring Machine Gun Kelly)	2019	92	40	—	—	—	—	—	—	—		So Much Fun
"Light It Up"	2019	82	33	—	—	—	—	—	—	—		So Much Fun
"Surf" (featuring Gunna)	2019	61	24	—	—	—	—	—	—	—	RIAA: Gold	So Much Fun
"Bad Bad Bad" (featuring Lil Baby)	2019	32	15	47	—	72	—	— (Note: "Bad Bad Bad" did not enter the NZ Top 40 Singles Chart, but peaked at number six on the NZ Hot Singles Chart.)	—	—	RIAA: Platinum; MC: Gold; RMNZ: Gold	So Much Fun
"Lil Baby"	2019	84	35	—	—	—	—	—	—	—		So Much Fun
"What's the Move" (featuring Lil Uzi Vert)	2019	55	21	84	—	—	—	— (Note: "What's the Move" did not enter the NZ Top 40 Singles Chart, but peaked at number nine on the NZ Hot Singles Chart.)	—	—	RIAA: Platinum	So Much Fun
"I'm Scared" (featuring 21 Savage and Doe Boy)	2019	— (Note: "I'm Scared" did not enter the Billboard Hot 100, but peaked at number 21 on the Bubbling Under Hot 100 chart.)	— (Note: "I'm Scared" did not enter the Billboard Hot R&B/Hip-Hop Songs chart, but peaked at number one on the Billboard Bubbling Under R&B/Hip-Hop Singles chart.)	—	—	—	—	—	—	—		So Much Fun
"Mannequin Challenge" (featuring Juice Wrld)	2019	— (Note: "Mannequin Challenge" did not enter the Billboard Hot 100, but peaked at number nine on the Bubbling Under Hot 100 chart.)	— (Note: "Mannequin Challenge" did not enter the Billboard Hot R&B/Hip-Hop Songs chart, but peaked at number one on the Billboard Bubbling Under R&B/Hip-Hop Singles chart.)	—	—	—	—	—	—	—		So Much Fun
"Diamonds" (featuring Gunna)	2019	— (Note: "Diamonds" did not enter the Billboard Hot 100, but peaked at number nine on the Bubbling Under Hot 100 chart.)	—	—	—	—	—	— (Note: "Diamonds" did not enter the NZ Top 40 Singles Chart, but peaked at number 28 on the NZ Hot Singles Chart.)	—	—		So Much Fun
"Hop Off a Jet" (featuring Travis Scott)	2019	— (Note: "Hop Off a Jet" did not enter the Billboard Hot 100, but peaked at number one on the Bubbling Under Hot 100 chart.)	41	94	—	—	—	— (Note: "Hop Off a Jet" did not enter the NZ Top 40 Singles Chart, but peaked at number three on the NZ Hot Singles Chart.)	—	—		So Much Fun
"Millions"	2019	— (Note: "Millions" did not enter the Billboard Hot 100, but peaked at number 11 on the Bubbling Under Hot 100 chart.)	—	—	—	—	—	— (Note: "Millions" did not enter the NZ Top 40 Singles Chart, but peaked at number 24 on the NZ Hot Singles Chart.)	—	—		So Much Fun
"Might Not Give Up" (A Boogie wit da Hoodie featuring Young Thug)	2020	66	32	—	—	—	—	—	—	—		Artist 2.0
"We Should" (with Lil Baby)	2020	91	43	—	—	—	—	—	—	—	RIAA: Gold	My Turn
"City Girls" (with Chris Brown)	2020	—	—	—	—	—	—	— (Note: "City Girls" did not enter the NZ Top 40 Singles Chart, but peaked at number 31 on the NZ Hot Singles Chart.)	—	—	RMNZ: Platinum	Slime & B
"Strawberry Peels" (Lil Uzi Vert featuring Young Thug and Gunna)	2020	60	34	—	—	—	—	—	—	—		Lil Uzi Vert vs. the World 2
"Got the Guap" (Lil Uzi Vert featuring Young Thug)	2020	87	49	—	—	—	—	—	—	—		Lil Uzi Vert vs. the World 2
"No Debate" (Nav featuring Young Thug)	2020	— (Note: "No Debate" did not enter the Billboard Hot 100, but peaked at number 20 on the Bubbling Under Hot 100 chart.)	—	65	—	—	—	33	—	—		Good Intentions
"Harlem Shake" (Future featuring Young Thug)	2020	84	42	—	—	—	—	—	—	—		High Off Life
"Dance with Me" (Diplo featuring Thomas Rhett and Young Thug)	2020	—	—	—	—	—	—	—	—	—	RIAA: Gold; RMNZ: Gold	Diplo Presents Thomas Wesley, Chapter 1: Snake Oil
"One Watch" (Gunna featuring Young Thug)	2020	— (Note: "One Watch" did not enter the Billboard Hot 100, but peaked at number 21 on the Bubbling Under Hot 100 chart.)	—	—	—	—	—	—	—	—		Wunna (Deluxe)
"Rich Nigga Shit" (21 Savage and Metro Boomin featuring Young Thug)	2020	26	13	33	—	—	—	7	54	29	RIAA: 3× Platinum; BPI: Silver; RMNZ: Platinum	Savage Mode II
"Slatty" (with YSL Records and Gunna featuring Yak Gotti and Lil Duke)	2021	99	39	—	—	—	—	—	—	154		Slime Language 2
"Ski" (with YSL Records and Gunna)	2021	18	11	33	—	—	—	— (Note: "Ski" did not enter the NZ Top 40 Singles Chart, but peaked at number six on the NZ Hot Singles Chart.)	72	23	RIAA: Gold	Slime Language 2
"Diamonds Dancing" (with YSL Records and Gunna featuring Travis Scott)	2021	46	21	39	—	—	—	— (Note: "Diamonds Dancing" did not enter the NZ Top 40 Singles Chart, but peaked at number five on the NZ Hot Singles Chart.)	80	35		Slime Language 2
"Solid" (with YSL Records and Gunna featuring Drake)	2021	12	6	8	92	42	90	— (Note: "Solid" did not enter the NZ Top 40 Singles Chart, but peaked at number one on the NZ Hot Singles Chart.)	36	11	RIAA: Gold; BPI: Silver; RMNZ: Gold	Slime Language 2
"Came and Saw" (with YSL Records featuring Rowdy Rebel)	2021	66	29	76	—	—	—	—	—	87		Slime Language 2
"Paid the Fine" (with YSL Records featuring Lil Baby and YTB Trench)	2021	77	32	93	—	—	—	—	—	104		Slime Language 2
"Proud of You" (with YSL Records featuring Lil Uzi Vert and Yung Kayo)	2021	59	27	57	—	—	—	— (Note: "Proud of You" did not enter the NZ Top 40 Singles Chart, but peaked at number nine on the NZ Hot Singles Chart.)	—	65		Slime Language 2
"Real" (with YSL Records featuring Unfoonk)	2021	— (Note: "Real" did not enter the Billboard Hot 100, but peaked at number eight on the Bubbling Under Hot 100 chart.)	47	—	—	—	—	—	—	—		Slime Language 2
"Wassup" (Cordae featuring Young Thug)	2021	—	—	—	—	—	—	37	—	—		Just Until...
"Litty" (with YSL Records featuring DaBaby)	2021	— (Note: "Litty" did not enter the Billboard Hot 100, but peaked at number 25 on the Bubbling Under Hot 100 chart.)	—	—	—	—	—	— (Note: "Litty" did not enter the NZ Top 40 Singles Chart, but peaked at number 32 on the NZ Hot Singles Chart.)	—	—		Slime Language 2 (Deluxe)
"Emergency" (21 Savage featuring Gunna and Young Thug)	2021	— (Note: "Emergency" did not enter the Billboard Hot 100, but peaked at number 17 on the Bubbling Under Hot 100 chart.)	—	—	—	—	—	—	—	—		Spiral: From the Book of Saw Soundtrack
"Payday" (Doja Cat featuring Young Thug)	2021	— (Note: "Payday" did not enter the Billboard Hot 100, but peaked at number nine on the Bubbling Under Hot 100 chart.)	—	—	—	—	—	—	—	—		Planet Her
"Up the Side" (with Lil Baby and Lil Durk)	2021	80	35	—	—	—	—	—	—	—		The Voice of the Heroes
"Losses" (Polo G featuring Young Thug)	2021	— (Note: "Losses" did not enter the Billboard Hot 100, but peaked at number 17 on the Bubbling Under Hot 100 chart.)	—	—	—	—	—	—	—	—		Hall of Fame
"Remote Control" (Kanye West featuring Young Thug)	2021	40	20	39	—	—	—	—	—	—		Donda
"We Slide" (Meek Mill featuring Young Thug)	2021	— (Note: "We Slide" did not enter the Billboard Hot 100, but peaked at number one on the Bubbling Under Hot 100 chart.)	46	—	—	—	—	—	—	—		Expensive Pain
"Die Slow" (with Strick)	2021	— (Note: "Die Slow" did not enter the Billboard Hot 100, but peaked at number four on the Bubbling Under Hot 100 chart.)	46	—	—	—	—	—	—	—		Punk
"Stressed" (with J. Cole and T-Shyne)	2021	69	25	84	—	—	—	— (Note: "Stressed" did not enter the NZ Top 40 Singles Chart, but peaked at number 16 on the NZ Hot Singles Chart.)	—	114		Punk
"Stupid/Asking"	2021	— (Note: "Stupid/Asking" did not enter the Billboard Hot 100, but peaked at number nine on the Bubbling Under Hot 100 chart.)	50	—	—	—	—	—	—	—		Punk
"Recognize Real" (with Gunna)	2021	— (Note: "Recognize Real" did not enter the Billboard Hot 100, but peaked at number three on the Bubbling Under Hot 100 chart.)	45	—	—	—	—	—	—	—		Punk
"Contagious"	2021	— (Note: "Contagious" did not enter the Billboard Hot 100, but peaked at number 20 on the Bubbling Under Hot 100 chart.)	—	—	—	—	—	—	—	—		Punk
"Peepin Out the Window" (with Future and BSlime)	2021	95	38	—	—	—	—	—	—	—		Punk
"Rich Nigga Shit" (with Juice Wrld)	2021	78	29	98	—	—	—	— (Note: "Rich Nigga Shit" did not enter the NZ Top 40 Singles Chart, but peaked at number 24 on the NZ Hot Singles Chart.)	—	—		Punk
"Livin It Up" (with Post Malone and ASAP Rocky)	2021	68	—	62	—	—	—	— (Note: "Livin It Up" did not enter the NZ Top 40 Singles Chart, but peaked at number eight on the NZ Hot Singles Chart.)	—	—	RMNZ: Gold	Punk
"Insure My Wrist" (with Gunna)	2021	— (Note: "Insure My Wrist" did not enter the Billboard Hot 100, but peaked at number 22 on the Bubbling Under Hot 100 chart.)	—	—	—	—	—	—	—	—		Punk
"Scoliosis" (with Lil Double 0)	2021	— (Note: "Scoliosis" did not enter the Billboard Hot 100, but peaked at number 13 on the Bubbling Under Hot 100 chart.)	—	—	—	—	—	—	—	—		Punk
"Road Rage"	2021	— (Note: "Road Rage" did not enter the Billboard Hot 100, but peaked at number 18 on the Bubbling Under Hot 100 chart.)	—	—	—	—	—	—	—	—		Punk
"Droppin Jewels"	2021	— (Note: "Droppin Jewels" did not enter the Billboard Hot 100, but peaked at number 17 on the Bubbling Under Hot 100 chart.)	—	—	—	—	—	—	—	—		Punk
"Love You More" (with Nate Ruess, Gunna, and Jeff Bhasker)	2021	— (Note: "Love You More" did not enter the Billboard Hot 100, but peaked at number 23 on the Bubbling Under Hot 100 chart.)	—	—	—	—	—	—	—	—		Punk
"Day Before" (with Mac Miller)	2021	— (Note: "Day Before" did not enter the Billboard Hot 100, but peaked at number seven on the Bubbling Under Hot 100 chart.)	48	—	—	—	—	—	—	—		Punk
"Pushin P" (Gunna and Future featuring Young Thug)	2022	7	2	10	—	—	—	16	28	10	RIAA: Platinum; BPI: Silver; RMNZ: Platinum	DS4Ever
"Mop" (Gunna featuring Young Thug)	2022	45	15	64	—	—	—	—	—	56		DS4Ever
"Push It" (NLE Choppa featuring Young Thug)	2022	— (Note: "Push It" did not enter the Billboard Hot 100, but peaked at number four on the Bubbling Under Hot 100 chart.)	40	—	—	—	—	40	—	—		Me vs. Me
"Outside" (Yeat featuring Young Thug)	2022	— (Note: "Outside" did not enter the Billboard Hot 100, but peaked at number 16 on the Bubbling Under Hot 100 chart.)	—	—	—	—	—	—	—	—		2 Alive
"Die in California" (Machine Gun Kelly featuring Gunna, Young Thug, and Landon Barker)	2022	— (Note: "Die in California" did not enter the Billboard Hot 100, but peaked at number 15 on the Bubbling Under Hot 100 chart.)	—	95	—	—	—	—	—	—		Mainstream Sellout
"For a Nut" (Future featuring Gunna and Young Thug)	2022	24	14	95	—	—	—	—	—	40		I Never Liked You
"Chocolate" (with Quavo, Takeoff, and Gunna)	2022	—	48	—	—	—	—	—	—	—		Only Built for Infinity Links
"Never Hating" (with Lil Baby)	2022	19	8	47	—	—	—	— (Note: "Never Hating" did not enter the NZ Top 40 Singles Chart, but peaked at number 16 on the NZ Hot Singles Chart.)	—	32		It's Only Me
"Trance" (with Metro Boomin and Travis Scott)	2022	42	14	24	—	—	—	— (Note: "Trance" did not enter the NZ Top 40 Singles Chart, but peaked at number 17 on the NZ Hot Singles Chart.)	60	42	RIAA: Platinum; ARIA: Platinum; MC: Platinum; BPI: Gold; RMNZ: Gold	Heroes & Villains
"Metro Spider" (with Metro Boomin)	2022	43	15	26	—	—	—	—	—	47	MC: Gold	Heroes & Villains
"Parade on Cleveland" (featuring Drake)	2023	39	11	44	—	—	—	— (Note: "Parade on Cleveland" did not enter the NZ Top 40 Singles Chart, but peaked at number eight on the NZ Hot Singles Chart.)	97	76		Business Is Business
"Money on the Dresser"	2023	78	29	—	—	—	—	—	—	—		Business Is Business
"Gucci Grocery Bag"	2023	100	40	—	—	—	—	—	—	—		Business Is Business
"Cars Bring Me Out" (featuring Future)	2023	52	16	71	—	—	—	—	—	145		Business Is Business
"Wit da Racks" (featuring 21 Savage, Travis Scott and Yak Gotti)	2023	56	18	70	—	—	—	— (Note: "Wit da Racks" did not enter the NZ Top 40 Singles Chart, but peaked at number 14 on the NZ Hot Singles Chart.)	—	165		Business Is Business
"Uncle M"	2023	81	31	—	—	—	—	—	—	—		Business Is Business
"Abracadabra" (featuring Travis Scott)	2023	97	39	—	—	—	—	—	—	—		Business Is Business
"Went Thru It"	2023	— (Note: "Went Thru It" did not enter the Billboard Hot 100, but peaked at number seven on the Bubbling Under Hot 100 chart.)	47	—	—	—	—	—	—	—		Business Is Business
"Want Me Dead" (featuring 21 Savage)	2023	59	20	77	—	—	—	— (Note: "Want Me Dead" did not enter the NZ Top 40 Singles Chart, but peaked at number 13 on the NZ Hot Singles Chart.)	—	195		Business Is Business
"Hellcat Kenny" (featuring Lil Uzi Vert)	2023	70	26	—	—	—	—	—	—	—		Business Is Business
"Mad Dog"	2023	— (Note: "Mad Dog" did not enter the Billboard Hot 100, but peaked at number three on the Bubbling Under Hot 100 chart.)	44	—	—	—	—	—	—	—		Business Is Business
"Jonesboro"	2023	— (Note: "Jonesboro" did not enter the Billboard Hot 100, but peaked at number two on the Bubbling Under Hot 100 chart.)	42	—	—	—	—	—	—	—		Business Is Business
"Hoodie" (featuring BSlime and Lil Gotit)	2023	— (Note: "Hoodie" did not enter the Billboard Hot 100, but peaked at number 23 on the Bubbling Under Hot 100 chart.)	—	—	—	—	—	—	—	—		Business Is Business
"Skitzo" (Travis Scott featuring Young Thug)	2023	34	18	29	—	—	—	36	— (Note: "Skitzo" did not enter the UK Singles Chart, as chart rules only allow three songs per artist to chart within the top one hundred at a time, but peaked at number 84 on the UK Streaming Chart.)	34	MC: Gold	Utopia
"Pop Ur Shit" (with 21 Savage and Metro Boomin)	2024	31	13	29	—	—	—	—	—	41		American Dream
"River" (with Kanye West and Ty Dolla Sign as part of ¥$)	2024	— (Note: "River" did not enter the Billboard Hot 100, but peaked at number 11 on the Bubbling Under Hot 100 chart.)	32	—	—	—	—	—	—	—		Vultures 2
"It's Up" (with Drake and 21 Savage)	2024	28	8	24	—	94	—	— (Note: "It's Up" did not enter the NZ Top 40 Singles Chart, but peaked at number three on the NZ Hot Singles Chart.)	82	47		100 Gigs
"Dum, Dumb, and Dumber" (with Lil Baby and Future)	2025	16	4	38	—	—	—	— (Note: "Dum, Dumb, and Dumber" did not enter the NZ Top 40 Singles Chart, but peaked at number five on the NZ Hot Singles Chart.)	46	32		WHAM
"We Need All Da Vibes" (with Playboi Carti and Ty Dolla Sign)	2025	71	34	63	—	—	—	—	—	74		Music
"Ninja"	2025	69	15	96	—	—	—	— (Note: "Ninja" did not enter the NZ Top 40 Singles Chart, but peaked at number 14 on the NZ Hot Singles Chart.)	—	—		UY Scuti
"Yuck" (featuring Ken Carson)	2025	— (Note: "Yuck" did not enter the Billboard Hot 100, but peaked at number 6 on the Bubbling Under Hot 100 chart.)	32	—	—	—	—	— (Note: "Yuck" did not enter the NZ Top 40 Singles Chart, but peaked at number 23 on the NZ Hot Singles Chart.)	—	—		UY Scuti
"On the News" (featuring Cardi B)	2025	— (Note: "On the News" did not enter the Billboard Hot 100, but peaked at number 23 on the Bubbling Under Hot 100 chart.)	38	—	—	—	—	—	—	—		UY Scuti
"Pardon My Back" (featuring Lil Baby)	2025	— (Note: "Pardon My Back" did not enter the Billboard Hot 100, but peaked at number 20 on the Bubbling Under Hot 100 chart.)	36	—	—	—	—	—	—	—		UY Scuti
"Walk Down" (featuring 21 Savage)	2025	— (Note: "Walk Down" did not enter the Billboard Hot 100, but peaked at number 1 on the Bubbling Under Hot 100 chart.)	29	—	—	—	—	— (Note: "Walk Down" did not enter the NZ Top 40 Singles Chart, but peaked at number 22 on the NZ Hot Singles Chart.)	—	—		UY Scuti
"Pipe Down" (featuring Travis Scott)	2025	—	44	—	—	—	—	— (Note: "Pipe Down" did not enter the NZ Top 40 Singles Chart, but peaked at number 15 on the NZ Hot Singles Chart.)	—	—		UY Scuti
"—" denotes a recording that did not chart or was not released in that territory.

== Guest appearances ==
List of non-single guest appearances, with other performing artists, showing year released and album name
Title	Year	Other artist(s)	Album
"I Got It"	2010	Cash Out	Street Is Watching
"On My Grind"	2012	YC, Chill Will	Back From Vacation
"Yeah"	2012	YC, Chill Will	Back From Vacation
"Miracle"	2013	Gucci Mane	Trap God 2
"Break Dancin"	2013	Gucci Mane	Trap God 2
"Fell"	2013	Waka Flocka Flame, Gucci Mane	DuFlocka Rant 2
"Come Around"	2013	Waka Flocka Flame	DuFlocka Rant: Halftime Show
"Intro"	2013	Gucci Mane, Peewee Longway	World War 3: Lean
"Extacy Pill"	2013	Gucci Mane	World War 3: Lean
"Get TF Out My Face	2013	Rich Homie Quan	I Promise I Will Never Stop Going In
"Chasen Paper"	2013	Gucci Mane, Rich Homie Quan	Trap House III
"Off The Leash"	2013	Gucci Mane, PeeWee Longway	Trap House III
"Some More"	2013	Metro Boomin	19 & Boomin
"Can't See Em"	2013	Metro Boomin	19 & Boomin
"Any Thing"	2013	Gucci Mane	The State vs. Radric Davis II: The Caged Bird Sings
"Clappers" (Remix)	2013	Wale, Rick Ross, Fat Trel	none
"Jack Tripper"	2014	A-Trak, Lex Luger, PeeWee Longway	Low Pros
"Communication"	2014	Casino	Frank Matthews
"All This Money"	2014	Casino, 550	Frank Matthews
"What's Wrong"	2014	Figg Panamera, Future	The Independent Game
"Ain't No Problems"	2014	Waka Flocka Flame, Judo	Re-up
"Laugh"	2014	Chinx Drugz, Shad da God	none
"Treasure"	2014	Dun Deal, Zuse	B.A.S.S.
"Put Ya Hands Up"	2014	Young Dolph, Gucci Mane	Cross Country Trappin
"In Too Deep"	2014	Migos, Rich Homie Quan	Streets on Lock III
"Freestyle"	2014	Migos	Streets on Lock III
"Wrk That Dough"	2014	Blaze, Peewee Longway	none
"Shine"	2014	Gucci Mane, Waka Flocka Flame	none
"Juiced"	2014	Lotto, Fat Trel	Art of Finesse
"Nasty" (Remix)	2014	Bandit Gang Marco, Kevin Gates	You Don't Know Me
"Big Better"	2014	Young Scooter, K Blacka, Videc	Street Lottery 2: Remix Edition
"Paper Problems"	2014	Gucci Mane, Peewee Longway	Brick Factory Vol. 1
"Homeboys"	2014	Gucci Mane, MPA Duke, Waka Flocka Flame, Young Dolph, OG Boo Dirty	Brick Factory Vol. 1
"Love Somebody"	2014	Gucci Mane	Brick Factory Vol. 1
"New Atlanta"	2014	Migos, Jermaine Dupri, Rich Homie Quan	No Label 2
"1017"	2014	Migos	The Green Album
"Problems"	2014	Migos	The Green Album
"Blame It on Her"	2014	Peewee Longway	The White Album
"Crazy"	2014	Peewee Longway	The White Album
"All in a Day"	2014	Berner, YG, Vital	none
"Who TF Is Yung Booke"	2014	Yung Booke	City on My Back 2
"Skyfall"	2014	Travis Scott	Days Before Rodeo
"I Need War"	2014	T.I.	G.D.O.D. II
"Dresser (Lil Boy)"	2014	2 Chainz	B.C. (Before Chainz)
"Eww Eww Eww" (Remix)	2014	Zuse, T.I.	Plugged
"Treasure"	2014	Zuse	Plugged
"Mayday"	2014	Zuse	Plugged
"Nothing but Net"	2015	Travis Scott, PartyNextDoor	none
"Like a Hott Boy"	2015	Kid Ink	Full Speed
"No One Else"	2015	Gucci Mane, Peewee Longway, Jose Guapo	Trap House 5
"Off-Set"	2015	T.I.	Furious 7: Original Motion Picture Soundtrack
"No Squares"	2015	Peewee Longway, Offset	The Blue M&M Vol 2: King Size
"Ready"	2015	Peewee Longway, Jose Guapo	The Blue M&M Vol 2: King Size
"100"	2015	Keri Hilson We Need to Talk	
"Yamborghini Dream"	2015	Lil Uzi Vert	Luv Is Rage
"Baby"	2015	Lil Reese	Supa Savage 2
"On Deck"	2015	Boosie Badazz	Touchdown 2 Cause Hell
"Maria I'm Drunk"	2015	Travis Scott, Justin Bieber	Rodeo
"Peanut Butter Jelly"	2015	T.I., Young Dro	Da' Nic
"Hold My Cup"	2015	Shad da God	2000 and God
"Highlights"	2016	Kanye West	The Life of Pablo
"Trap House"	2016	Lil Durk, Young Dolph	none
"Wrist" (Remix)	2016	Chris Brown, Jeezy	Before the Trap: Nights in Tarzana
"Cut It" (Remix)	2016	O.T. Genasis, Kevin Gates	none
"Mixtape"	2016	Chance the Rapper, Lil Yachty	Coloring Book
"So What"	2016	Lil Durk	Lil Durk 2X
"Thug Life"	2016	Nipsey Hussle	Slauson Boy 2
"I Do it"	2016	Nipsey Hussle, Mozzy	Slauson Boy 2
"Can I"	2016	DJ Drama, T.I.	Quality Street Music 2
"Ran It Up"	2016	Rich The Kid	Keep Flexin
"Who"	2016	DJ Esco, Future	Project E.T.
"Cocoon" (Remix)	2016	Migos	none
"Yeah Yeah"	2016	Travis Scott	none
"Party"	2016	DJ Mustard, YG	Cold Summer
"Misunderstood"	2016	DRAM	Big Baby D.R.A.M.
"Offended"	2016	Meek Mill, 21 Savage	DC4
"Dat Night"	2016	Chris Brown, Trey Songz	none
"Sacrifices"	2017	Drake, 2 Chainz	More Life
"Ice Melts"	2017	Drake	More Life
"Cook Up"	2017	Young Scooter	Street Lottery 4
"W Y O (What You On)"	2017	Mike Will Made It	Ransom 2
"Internet"	2017	Lil Durk	none
"Slide on Me" (Remix)	2017	Frank Ocean	none
"Top Off Benz"	2017	Kodak Black	Painting Pictures
"Whole Lot"	2017	21 Savage	Issa Album
"Rider"	2017	Lil Baby	Perfect Timing
"Pink Slip"	2017	Lil Baby	Too Hard
"Diamonds Dancing"	2017	Lil Duke	Life in the Hills
"Secure the Vibe"	2017	Gunna	Drip Season 2
"Backboard"	2017	Meek Mill	Meekend Music
"Black Out"	2017	French Montana	Jungle Rules
"We Ball"	2017	Meek Mill	Wins and Losses
"Big Business"	2017	Chance The Rapper	none
"That Bag"	2017	T.I., Young Dro, Trev Case	We Want Smoke
"Reminder" (Remix)	2017	The Weeknd, ASAP Rocky	Starboy (Deluxe)
"Them Boyz"	2017	Shad da God	God Gang
"Run it Back"	2017	Tyga	BitchImTheShit2
"Xantastic"	2017	B.o.B	Ether
"On Me"	2017	Lil Yachty	Quality Control: Control the Streets Volume 1
"Gangstas & Dancers"	2017	Giggs, Lil Duke	Wamp 2 Dem
"Mandatory Drug Test"	2017	Moneybagg Yo	Fed Baby's
"Don't Play with It"	2017	Gunna, Wheezy	Drip or Drown
"Even the Odds"	2017	Big Sean, Metro Boomin	Double or Nothing
"Oh Okay"	2018	Gunna, Lil Baby	Drip Season 3
"King Kong"	2018	Gunna	Drip Season 3
"Rondo"	2018	6ix9ine, Tory Lanez	Day69
"Don't Know Me"	2018	Trae Tha Truth	Hometown Hero
"Trippple Cross	2018	Young Scooter, Future	Trippple Cross
"Both Sides"	2018	Young Scooter, Future	Trippple Cross
"Play with Millions"	2018	Young Scooter, Casino	Trippple Cross
"Bread Crumbs"	2018	Young Scooter, VL Deck	Trippple Cross
"No Slow Money"	2018	DJ Esco, Future	Kolorblind
"Xotic"	2018	DJ Esco, Future, Rich The Kid	Kolorblind
"Showed You"	2018	DJ Esco, Future, Dej Loaf, A Boogie wit da Hoodie	Kolorblind
"Money Train"	2018	Future, Gunna	Superfly (soundtrack)
"Show My Chain Some Love"	2018	Future	Superfly (soundtrack)
"Tie My Shoes"	2018	Future	Superfly (soundtrack)
""Georgia"	2018	Future	Superfly (soundtrack)
"Back Bone"	2018	none	Before Anythang: The Album
"This is America"	2018	Childish Gambino, Quavo, 21 Savage, BlocBoy JB, Slim Jxmmi	none
"Choppa Won't Miss"	2018	Playboi Carti	Die Lit
"Bussdown"	2018	Moneybagg Yo	Bet on Me
"Right Now"	2018	Lil Baby	Harder Than Ever
"Offshore"	2018	Swae Lee	Swaecation
"100 sticks"	2018	G Herbo	Swervo
"Better Than You Ever Been"	2018	Taylor Bennett	Be Yourself
"Permanent Scar"	2018	Youngboy Never Broke Again, Quando Rondo	4Loyalty
"My Jeans"	2018	Gunna, Lil Baby	Drip Harder
"Red Bentley"	2018	Future, Juice Wrld	Wrld on Drugs
"Up to Something"	2018	Metro Boomin, Travis Scott	Not All Heroes Wear Capes
"Lesbian"	2018	Metro Boomin, Gunna	Not All Heroes Wear Capes
"Section 8"	2018	Lil Baby	Street Gossip
"Fate"	2018	Swae Lee	Creed II
"Splash Warning"	2018	Meek Mill, Future, Roddy Ricch	Championships
"Unicorn Purp"	2019	Future	The Wizrd
"3 Headed Snake"	2019	Gunna	Drip or Drown 2
"Screaming Slatt"	2019	Hoodrich Pablo Juan	BLO:The Movie
"High Top Versace	2019	2 Chainz	Rap or Go to the League
"On GOD"	2019	Juice Wrld	Death Race for Love
"Fall Threw"	2019	Rich the Kid, Gunna	The World Is Yours 2
"Tussin"	2019	Nav	Bad Habits
"Million Dollar Mansion"	2019	Lil Keed	Long Live Mexico
"Mayday"	2019	Chase B, Sheck Wes	none
Woah Woah"l"	2019	Mustard, Gunna	Perfect Ten
"Feels"	2019	Ed Sheeran, J Hus	No.6 Collaborations Project
"Grave Digger"	2019	Doe Boy	Streetz Need Me 2
"Hold Up"	2019	Yung Bans, Gunna	Misunderstood
"Big Rocks"	2019	Offset	Control the Streets, Volume 2
"Long Time"	2019	24Heavy	Control the Streets, Volume 2
"Tokyo Ghoul"	2019	Highly Suspect	MCID
"Might Not Give Up"	2020	A Boogie wit da Hoodie	Artist 2.0
"Strawberry Peels"	2020	Lil Uzi Vert, Gunna	Lil Uzi Vert vs. the World 2
"Got the Guap"	2020	Lil Uzi Vert	Lil Uzi Vert vs. the World 2
"The War"	2020	Joyner Lucas	ADHD
"D4L"	2020	Drake, Future	Dark Lane Demo Tapes
"No Debate"	2020	Nav	Good Intentions
"Spend It"	2020	Nav	Good Intentions
"Harlem Shake"	2020	Future	High Off Life
"Far"	2020	Gunna	Wunna
"Till the Morning"	2020	Lil Yachty, Lil Durk	Lil Boat 3
"Rain Shower"	2020	Gucci Mane	So Icy Summer
"Gucci Land"	2020	Gucci Mane	So Icy Summer
"Freakiest in the World"	2020	Gucci Mane	So Icy Summer
"Paranoia"	2020	Pop Smoke, Gunna	Shoot for the Stars, Aim for the Moon (Deluxe)
"One Watch"	2020	Gunna	Wunna (Deluxe)
"Kiss Em Peace"	2020	Lil Keed	Trapped On Cleveland 3
"Hibachi"	2020	Lil Keed	Trapped On Cleveland 3
"Geed U"	2020	Trav	Nothing Happens Overnight
"Dance with Me"	2020	Diplo, Thomas Rhett	Thomas Wesley: Chapter 1
"Respect It"	2020	Big Sean, Hit-Boy	Detroit 2
"Rich Nigga Shit"	2020	21 Savage, Metro Boomin	Savage Mode 2
"Lift Me Up"	2020	Ty Dolla Sign, Future	Featuring Ty Dolla Sign
"Spaceships"	2020	Trippie Redd	Pegasus
"Wanna See You"	2020	Lil Keed	Trapped on Cleveland 3 (Deluxe)
"Repercussions"	2020	Nav	Emergency Tsunami
"Shopping Spree"	2020	Davido, Chris Brown	A Better Time
"Wassup"	2021	Cordae	Just Until...
"Emergency"	2021	21 Savage, Gunna	Spiral: From the Book of Saw Soundtrack
"Up the Side"	2021	Lil Baby, Lil Durk	The Voice of the Heroes
"Playa Chanel"	2021	Lil Gotit	Top Chef Gotit
"911"	2021	Unfoonk, YSL Records	My Struggle
"PradaBang"	2021	IDK	USee4Yourself
"Losses"	2021	Polo G	Hall of Fame
"Payday"	2021	Doja Cat	Planet Her
"Walked In"	2021	Mariah the Scientist	Ry Ry World
"Lick Back" (Remix)	2021	EST Gee, Future	Bigger than Life or Death
"I Told Her"	2021	Lil Duke, YSL Records	Duke Hefner
"Not the Same"	2021	Lil Duke, YSL Records	Duke Hefner
"Mob Ties"	2021	YTB Trench, YSL Records	Versatalien
"Always Love You"	2021	Elton John, Nicki Minaj	The Lockdown Sessions
"Caprisun Fun"	2021	YNW Melly	Just a Matter of Slime
"Remote Control"	2021	Kanye West	Donda
"We Slide"	2021	Meek Mill	Expensive Pain
"In Love wit a Fly Girl"	2021	Strick	Strick Land
"Emotions"	2021	Bighead, Yung Booke, Three Days Grace	Emotions
"Pushin P"	2022	Gunna, Future	DS4Ever
"Mop"	2022	Gunna	DS4Ever
"Push It"	2022	NLE Choppa	Me vs. Me
"Outside"	2022	Yeat	2 Alivë
"Die in California"	2022	Machine Gun Kelly, Gunna, Landon Barker	Mainstream Sellout
"Fighting Demons"	2022	T-Shyne, YSL Records	Confetti Nights
"Sugar Water"	2022	T-Shyne	Confetti Nights
"For a Nut"	2022	Future, Gunna	I Never Liked You
"Get in My Bag"	2022	AB	Paradigm
"Chocolate"	2022	Quavo, Takeoff, Gunna	Only Built for Infinity Links
"Breathe Slow"	2022	G Herbo	Survivor's Remorse
"Never Hating"	2022	Lil Baby	It's Only Me
"Trance"	2022	Metro Boomin, Travis Scott	Heroes & Villains
"Metro Spider"	2022	Metro Boomin	Heroes & Villains
"Live a Lil"	2022	Peewee Longway	Live A Lil
"Royal Flush"	2023	Rae Sremmurd	Sremm 4 Life
"Skitzo"	2023	Travis Scott	Utopia
"Focused"	2023	Quavo	Rocket Power
"Cobra"	2023	Tobi Lou, Farada	If You're Going Through Hell I'm Right Behind You
"Ride"	2023	Mariah the Scientist	To Be Eaten Alive
"Pop Ur Shit"	2024	21 Savage, Metro Boomin	American Dream
"Rager Boyz"	2024	Kid Cudi	Insano
"Twisting Our Fingers"	2024	Lil Gotit, Lil Keed	Shut the Door, Nobody Listening
"Let's Go Away"	2024	A Boogie wit da Hoodie	Better Off Alone
"Ghetto"	2024	Mustard, Lil Durk	Faith of a Mustard Seed
"River"	2024	¥$ (Kanye West & Ty Dolla Sign)	Vultures 2
"Dum, Dumb, and Dumber"	2025	Lil Baby, Future	WHAM
"Gun in Yo Purse"	2025	Chance the Rapper, TiaCorine	Star Line
"UY Scuti"	2026	Tezzus & Diamond*	UY Scuti Bøyz
"Da Fuck"	2026	Rylo Rodriguez, Tezzus	UY Scuti Bøyz
"Ashin' The Blunt"	2026	6lack	Love is the New Gangsta
"Drug Kit"	2026	Ken Carson	Xperiment
"Føurs"	2026	Diamond*	Bling Slime Vøl 1

== Music videos ==
Year	Title	Director	Artist(s)
As main performer
2014	"Stoner"	Be El Be	none
2015	"Check"	with Be El Be	none
2015	"Constantly Hating"	Be El Be	featuring Birdman
2015	"Halftime"	Be El Be	none
2015	"With That"	Be El Be	featuring Lil Duke
2015	"Best Friend"	with Be El Be	none
2015	"Power"	with Be El Be	none
2015	"Again"	Cam Kirk	Young Thug featuring Gucci Mane
2015	"Thief in the Night"	Be El Be	Young Thug featuring Trouble
2015	"Big Racks"	Be El Be	Young Thug featuring Lil Uzi Vert
2016	"King Troup"	Be El Be	none
2016	"Worth it"	Be El Be	none
2016	"Texas Love"	Be El Be	none
2016	"F*** Cancer"	Be El Be	none
2016	"My People"	Be El Be	Young Thug featuring Lil Duke
2016	"Turn Up"		none
2016	"Pick Up the Phone"		with Travis Scott featuring Quavo
2016	"Memo"		none
2016	"Webbie"		Young Thug featuring Lil Duke
2017	"Wyclef Jean"		none
2017	"Guwop"		featuring Quavo, Offset and Young Scooter
2017	"Safe"	GLP	none
2017	"All the Time"	DAPS	none
2017	"Gang Up"		Young Thug, 2 Chainz, Wiz Khalifa and PnB Rock
2017	"Relationship"	Young Thug	Young Thug Featuring Future
2017	"Homie"		Young Thug and Carnage featuring Meek Mill
2017	"Family Don't Matter"		Young Thug featuring Millie Go Lightly
2018	"All the Smoke"		Young Thug and Future
2018	"Mink Flow"		Young Thug and Future
2018	"Anybody"		featuring Nicki Minaj
2018	"Group Home"		Young Thug and Future
2018	"Up"		featuring Lil Uzi Vert
2018	"Gain Clout"		none
2018	"Dirty Shoes"		featuring Gunna
2019	"Chanel (Go Get It)"		featuring Gunna & Lil Baby
2019	"The London"		featuring J.Cole & Travis Scott
2019	"Surf"	Be El Be	featuring Gunna
2019	"What's The Move"		featuring Lil Uzi Vert
2019	"Just How It Is"	AWGE	none
2019	"Hot (Remix)"		featuring Gunna and Travis Scott
2020	"Boy Back"		featuring Nav
2020	"Go Crazy"		Chris Brown & Young Thug
2020	"Say You Love Me"		Chris Brown & Young Thug
2020	"Take It To Trial"		Young Stoner Life, Young Thug, Gunna featuring Yak Gotti
2021	"Bad Boy"	Cole Bennett	Juice Wrld and Young Thug
2021	"Ski"		Young Stoner Life, Young Thug & Gunna
2021	"Real"		Young Stoner Life & Young Thug featuring Unfoonk
2021	"Paid The Fine"		Young Stoner Life, Young Thug & Gunna featuring Lil Baby & YTB Trench
2021	"Moon Man"		Young Stoner Life & Young Thug featuring Kid Cudi & Strick
As featured performer
2016	"Trap House"		Lil Durk featuring Young Thug and Young Dolph
2016	"No Limit"	Joey Toman	Usher featuring Young Thug
2016	"I Swear"	Kidd Art	Wyclef Jean featuring Young Thug
2016	"Guwop Home"		Gucci Mane featuring Young Thug
2016	"Consuela"		Belly featuring Young Thug and Zack
2019	"Fetish" (Remix)	Logan Fields	Lil Keed featuring Young Thug
2020	"Franchise"	Travis Scott	Travis Scott featuring Young Thug and M.I.A. (rapper)
2021	"Emotions"		Bighead & Yung Booke featuring Three Days Grace and Young Thug
Cameo appearances
2016	"No Problem"	Austin Vesely	Chance the Rapper featuring 2 Chainz and Lil Wayne
2019	"Superstar"	Young Thug, Gunna	Lil Gotit featuring Gunna

== See also ==
- Bankroll Mafia discography
