= No Cap =

No Cap may refer to:

- NoCap (born 1998), American rapper
- "No Cap", a song by Disclosure, 2025
- "No Cap", a song by Future and Young Thug from the 2017 mixtape Super Slimey
- "No Cap", a song by Lil Tjay from the 2021 album Destined 2 Win
- "No Cap (Remix)", a song by Pop Smoke from the 2021 soundtrack Boogie: The Original Motion Picture Soundtrack
- "No cap", a phrase from Generation Z slang meaning "Not lying"
