= Hear No Evil (Young Thug EP) =

EP by Young Thug
- Released: April 13, 2018
- Length: 12:36
- Labels: 300; Atlantic
- Producers: Charlie Handsome; DJ Spinz; Rex Kudo; Southside

Young Thug chronology
Super Slimey (2017)	Hear No Evil (2018)	Slime Language (2018)

Singles from Hear No Evil
- 1. "Anybody" Released: April 13, 2018

Hear No Evil is the debut extended play (EP) by American rapper Young Thug. It was released on April 13, 2018, by 300 Entertainment and Atlantic Records. It features guest appearances from Nicki Minaj, Lil Uzi Vert, and 21 Savage, with production from Southside, DJ Spinz, Rex Kudo, and Charlie Handsome. The EP emphasizes deafness and sign language in its title, along with the video for "Anybody".

The EP was supported by one single: "Anybody" featuring Nicki Minaj.

== Background and release ==
The release of the project came as a contradiction to a statement Young Thug made earlier that year, stating:

I got a brother that can't hear, so I want to act deaf for a year. I ain't going to put out no music this year.

On April 9, 2018 and April 10, 2018, Thug tweeted a couple of cryptic messages that simply read, "3" or "Three".

On April 11, 2018, Thug teased the music video for "Anybody" featuring Nicki Minaj, which was released in a sign language music video, ahead of the EP's release on April 12, 2018. It features an adolescent, a young man and a woman performing the song's lyrics in sign language.

On April 12, 2018, the cryptic messages was revealed as a 3-track EP. Thug revealed the EP's title and tracklist via Twitter.

The project is inspired by Thug's brother Deaf Greg, who is featured on the cover art.

== Reception ==
Professional ratings
Review scores
Source	Rating
The Daily Californian	3.5/5
Sputnikmusic	3.0/5

Justin Sidhu of The Daily Californian praised the project's production and stated that it's more comfortable than the "unconventional" Beautiful Thugger Girls. For Sputnikmusic, Jordan M. wrote that Thug "has always delighted in doing everything a little weirder than everyone else; rather, Hear No Evil embodies the simple pleasure of hearing Thug spitting enigmatic non-sequiturs for a few songs more".

== Track listing ==
No.	Title	Writer(s)	Producer(s)	Length
1.	"Anybody" (featuring Nicki Minaj)	Jeffery Williams; Masamune Kudo; Ryan Vojtesak; Onika Maraj	Rex Kudo; Charlie Handsome	4:14
2.	"Up" (featuring Lil Uzi Vert)	Williams; Joshua Luellen; Symere Woods	Southside	4:56
3.	"Now" (featuring 21 Savage)	Williams; Gary Hill; Shayaa Joseph	DJ Spinz	3:26
Total length:				12:36

== Personnel ==
Credits adapted from Alex Tumay's Twitter.

Technical

- Joe LaPorta – mastering (all tracks)
- Alex Tumay – mixing (all tracks)
- Max Lord – recording (track 2)
