= Anybody (song) =

Single by Young Thug featuring Nicki Minaj

from the album Hear No Evil
- Released: April 13, 2018
- Genre: Hip hop
- Length: 4:14
- Label: YSL; 300; Atlantic
- Songwriters: Young Thug; Onika Maraj; Masamune Kudo; Ryan Vojetsak
- Producers: Rex Kudo; Charlie Handsome

Young Thug singles chronology
"Patek Water" (2017)	"Anybody" (2018)	"The London" (2019)

Nicki Minaj singles chronology
"Chun-Li" (2018)	"Anybody" (2018)	"Ball for Me" (2018)

"Anybody" is a song by American rapper Young Thug featuring rapper Nicki Minaj. The track was released as the lead single from Young Thug's extended play Hear No Evil on April 13, 2018, alongside the EP.

== Music video ==
The official music video for the track was released on April 13, 2018, and is done entirely in sign language.

== Critical reception ==
Sheldon Pearce of Pitchfork said that the track "falls well short of his usual standard", and called it "lazily rapped".

== Charts ==
Chart (2018)	Peak position
Canada (Canadian Hot 100)	99
US Billboard Hot 100	89
US Hot R&B/Hip-Hop Songs (Billboard)	43

== Certifications ==
Region	Certification	Certified units/sales
United States (RIAA)	Gold	500,000^{‡}
^{‡} Sales+streaming figures based on certification alone.
