= Relationship (song) =

2017 song by Young Thug featuring Future

Song by Young Thug featuring Future

from the album Beautiful Thugger Girls
- Released: June 16, 2017
- Length: 3:35
- Songwriters: Jeffery Williams; Eduardo Burgess; Jonathan De la Rosa; Tariq Sharrieff
- Producers: Billboard Hitmakers; BLSSD

Music video
- "Relationship" on YouTube

"Relationship" is a song by American rapper Young Thug featuring fellow Atlanta rapper Future, from Young Thug's 2017 album Beautiful Thugger Girls. Billboard Hitmakers and BLSSD produced it. On the chorus, the two rappers joke that they are "in a relationship" with every woman they see, then admit that the arrangement has become too much to handle. Critics singled out the hook and the pairing of the two rappers, and one called the track a "booming ballad".

A music video directed by Young Thug and the Rite Brothers followed in September 2017. Modeled on Girls Gone Wild infomercials, it was shot on a yacht in Miami. The song reached number 65 on the Billboard Hot 100 and was later certified 2× Platinum by the Recording Industry Association of America (RIAA).

== Background ==
Young Thug at Florida International University

Young Thug and Future had a rocky stretch before they recorded together. After Young Thug released Slime Season 2 in 2015, Future tweeted that Thug would never have "the juice", which many fans took as a shot at him, and Thug answered with a tweet of his own. A year later, Thug posted a photo of the two of them at his birthday party and apologized for the online arguments.

"Relationship" appeared on Beautiful Thugger Girls, released on June 16, 2017. Young Thug had called the project his "singing album", and The Ringer noted that it was technically his debut album, arriving after more than five years of mixtapes and guest appearances. HotNewHipHop later described the record as mixing trap, country, R&B, pop and Latin influences.

== Composition ==
Future at Openair Frauenfeld in 2019

The song is about juggling too many romantic partners. XXL described it as a track about having too many girlfriends, with both rappers saying they are in a relationship with nearly every woman they hook up with, to the point that they need help. Future sings the hook, which begins with him being "in a relationship with all my bitches" and ends with him saying he needs to "cut some of 'em off".

Paul A. Thompson of Pitchfork saw the hook as a clue to the album's tone. Future is about eight years older than Young Thug, and Thompson heard in his verse the weariness that has run through his recent music, the emptiness that follows a life of excess. Thug, in Thompson's reading, had not reached that point yet and was still having fun. Marshall Gu of PopMatters made a similar point, noting how the hook goes from a boast to a plea for help by the end, and singled out the beat's direct melody and Future's Auto-Tuned vocals as reasons the song sticks. Gary Suarez of Crack Magazine called it a "booming ballad" with a Future-sung hook that is instantly memorable.

== Music video ==
The music video was released on September 27, 2017. Young Thug and the Rite Brothers directed it, and it was filmed in Miami. It copies the look of the late-1990s Girls Gone Wild VHS commercials, with grainy camcorder footage, bad spotlighting and night-vision shots. It opens on a fake VHS cover reading "Raw! Real! Uncut!" and shows instructions for ordering the tape, which is titled Relationship.

The rest of the video takes place on a yacht, where the two rappers party with women in bikinis. Vice noted that some of the women are topless and that "censored" labels cover them, as in the original Girls Gone Wild tapes. The twerking and nudity are hidden behind "NOT ON TV" and "CENSORED" stickers.

== Live performances ==
Young Thug joined Future on stage to perform "Relationship" at the 2018 Rolling Loud festival in Miami on May 13, 2018. He then went on to perform his own song "Killed Before".

== Critical reception ==
Reviewers of Beautiful Thugger Girls often picked "Relationship" out as a highlight. Renato Pagnani of The A.V. Club wrote that the two rappers' combined pop instincts gave the song's one-sided take on polyamory more charm than it had any right to have. Suarez of Crack praised the song's hook, and Gu of PopMatters listed it among the album's catchiest moments. XXL called it one of the best cuts on the album. When the video came out, Winston Cook-Wilson of Spin described the song as a lasting example of what two of Atlanta rap's biggest creative forces can do together.

== Credits and personnel ==
Credits adapted from Tidal and Apple Music.

- Young Thug – vocals, songwriting
- Future – vocals
- Eduardo Burgess – songwriting
- Jonathan De la Rosa – songwriting
- Tariq Sharrieff – songwriting
- Billboard Hitmakers – production
- BLSSD – production
- Kesha Lee – recording engineering
- Alex Tumay – mixing
- Joe LaPorta – mastering

== Charts ==
Chart performance for "Relationship"
Chart (2017–2020)	Peak position
Canada Hot 100 (Billboard)	26
US Billboard Hot 100	65
US Hot R&B/Hip-Hop Songs (Billboard)	26

== Certifications ==
Region	Certification	Certified units/sales
Canada (Music Canada)	2× Platinum	160,000^{‡}
United Kingdom (BPI)	Silver	200,000^{‡}
United States (RIAA)	2× Platinum	2,000,000^{‡}
^{‡} Sales+streaming figures based on certification alone.
