= Metro Spider =

2022 song by Metro Boomin and Young Thug

Song by Metro Boomin and Young Thug

from the album Heroes & Villains
- Released: December 2, 2022
- Length: 2:54
- Label: Boominati; Republic
- Songwriters: Leland Wayne; Jeffery Williams; Allen Ritter; Ozan Yildirim; Nik Frascona; Paul Agyei; Derek Kastal; Marcus Rucker
- Producers: Metro Boomin; Ritter; Oz; Nik D; Elkan

"Metro Spider" is a song by American record producer Metro Boomin and American rapper Young Thug from the former's second studio album Heroes & Villains (2022). It was produced by Metro Boomin, Allen Ritter, Oz, Nik D and Elkan.

== Composition ==
The production of the song includes piano, a string note, "deformed" vocal samples and trap beats, which overall have been described as menacing. Young Thug rhymes about luxury watches and feeling more famous than the president. Peter A. Berry of Complex considered it one of the tracks from Heroes & Villains which "make up a sleek, surrealistic vision of trap guided by the expert hand of its director." "Metro Spider" transitions into "I Can't Save You (Interlude)", the next track on the album.

== Critical reception ==
The song received generally positive reviews from critics. Hamza Riaz of Mic Cheque deemed it as one of the "bone-chilling cuts" and best tracks from Heroes & Villains. Brady Brickner-Wood of Pitchfork commented that Young Thug "steals the show", described his lyrics as "vivid, eccentric bars", and wrote, "Unlike other Thug verses that have emerged since his incarceration, 'Metro Spider' hardly feels like a leftover—in fact, Metro positions it as the album's centerpiece." Robert Blair of HotNewHipHop wrote, "On the subject of Jeffery, his delivery over the thunderous 'Metro Spider' is almost unrivaled across the project. A track that features one of his most fired-up verses in years can't be anything other than heartbreaking to hear Thug proclaim, 'If anything happens, my kids got Ms so everything's alright.'" Writing for Clash, Robin Murray stated "the swaggering 'Metro Spider' utilises a capable, if hardly classic, Young Thug feature."

== Charts ==
Chart performance for "Metro Spider"
Chart (2022)	Peak position
Canada Hot 100 (Billboard)	26
Global 200 (Billboard)	47
US Billboard Hot 100	43
US Hot R&B/Hip-Hop Songs (Billboard)	15

== Certifications ==
Certifications for "Metro Spider"
Region	Certification	Certified units/sales
Canada (Music Canada)	Gold	40,000^{‡}
^{‡} Sales+streaming figures based on certification alone.
