= Never Hating =

2022 song by Lil Baby and Young Thug

Song by Lil Baby and Young Thug

from the album It's Only Me
- Released: October 14, 2022
- Genre: Trap
- Length: 2:40
- Label: Quality Control; Motown; Wolfpack; 4PF
- Songwriters: Dominique Jones; Jeffrey Williams; Wesley Glass; Frédéric Lapointe; Eelis Oikarinen
- Producers: Wheezy; Sir Fredo; Ele Beatz

"Never Hating" is a song by American rappers Lil Baby and Young Thug from the former's third studio album It's Only Me (2022). It was produced by Wheezy, Sir Fredo of 808 Mafia and Ele Beatz.

== Composition ==
The song finds the rappers bragging about their high social status over a trap instrumental.

== Critical reception ==
The song received generally positive reviews from critics. Complex's Jessica McKinney considered it the best song from It's Only Me in a three-way tie, while Eric Skelton and Jordan Rose both considered the song to have the best feature from the album. Shanté Collier-McDermott of Clash commented Young Thug "delivers a non-stop onslaught of bars" and described the two artists as "going back-to-back for a freestyle feeling banger". Joshua Robinson of HotNewHipHop listed the song as some of the more "standout" tracks from the album. In an otherwise negative review of It's Only Me, Stephen Kearse of NPR mentioned it as one of the few songs in which Lil Baby "shakes off the lethargy".

== Charts ==
Chart performance for "Never Hating"
Chart (2022)	Peak position
Canada Hot 100 (Billboard)	47
Global 200 (Billboard)	32
New Zealand Hot Singles (RMNZ)	16
South Africa Streaming (TOSAC)	27
US Billboard Hot 100	19
US Hot R&B/Hip-Hop Songs (Billboard)	8

== Certifications ==
Certifications for "Never Hating"
Region	Certification	Certified units/sales
United States (RIAA)	Gold	500,000^{‡}
^{‡} Sales+streaming figures based on certification alone.
