= Patek Water =

2017 song by Future and Young Thug featuring Offset

Single by Future and Young Thug featuring Offset

from the album Super Slimey
- Released: December 12, 2017
- Genre: Hip hop; trap
- Length: 3:09
- Label: 300; Epic; Freebandz; YSL
- Songwriters: Nayvadius Wilburn; Jeffery Williams; Joshua Luellen; Dwan Avery; Masamune Kudo; Kiari Cephus
- Producers: Southside; DY Krazy; Rex Kudo

Future singles chronology
"End Game" (2017)	"Patek Water" (2017)	"Bum Bum Tam Tam (Remix)" (2017)

Young Thug singles chronology
"High End" (2017)	"Patek Water" (2017)	"Ride for Me" (2018)

Offset singles chronology
"Ric Flair Drip" (2017)	"Patek Water" (2017)	"Boss Life" (2017)

"Patek Water" is a song by American rappers Future and Young Thug featuring fellow American rapper Offset from the former two's collaborative mixtape Super Slimey (2017).

== Background ==
Kevin Goddard of HotNewHipHop describes that the collaboration marks the end of Future and Young Thug's feud. The song's title mentions Patek Phillipe, a Swiss luxury watch manufacturer. "Water" is a reference to the word "ice", a slang for diamonds.

== Charts ==
Chart (2017)	Peak position
Canada Hot 100 (Billboard)	39
US Billboard Hot 100	50
US Hot R&B/Hip-Hop Songs (Billboard)	17

== Certifications ==
Region	Certification	Certified units/sales
Canada (Music Canada)	Platinum	80,000^{‡}
United States (RIAA)	Gold	500,000^{‡}
^{‡} Sales+streaming figures based on certification alone.
