= Super Slimey =

Mixtape by Future and Young Thug
- Released: October 20, 2017
- Recorded: 2017
- Genres: Hip-hop; trap
- Length: 41:48
- Labels: Freebandz; YSL; Epic; 300; Atlantic
- Producers: BLSSD; Chef; DY; Fuse; London on da Track; Mike Will Made It; Rex Kudo; Richie Souf; Southside; TM88; Tre Pounds; Wheezy; Will-A-Fool

Young Thug chronology
Young Martha (2017)	Super Slimey (2017)	Hear No Evil (2018)

Future chronology
Hndrxx (2017)	Super Slimey (2017)	Superfly (Original Motion Picture Soundtrack) (2018)

Singles from Super Slimey
- 1. "Patek Water" Released: December 12, 2017

Super Slimey is a collaborative commercial mixtape by American rappers Future and Young Thug. It was released on October 20, 2017, by 300 Entertainment, Atlantic Records, Epic Records, Freebandz, and YSL Records. The mixtape features a sole guest appearance from Offset. It also features production from Southside, Richie Souf, Wheezy, and Fuse, among others.

== Background ==
In 2016, there were rumors that was circulating that Future and Young Thug were working on a project. Throughout 2017, Future and Young Thug posted pictures of themselves in the studio together through social media. The mixtape's release and cover art was announced a day before release on October 19, 2017 by the two rappers through their social media accounts.

== Critical reception ==
Professional ratings
Aggregate scores
Source	Rating
Metacritic	66/100
Review scores
Source	Rating
Exclaim!	6/10
HipHopDX	3.2/5
HotNewHipHop	70%
Pitchfork	7.1/10
Pretty Much Amazing	C+
Spectrum Culture	3.25/5 stars

Super Slimey was met with generally positive reviews. At Metacritic, which assigns a normalized rating out of 100 to reviews from mainstream publications, the album received an average score of 66, based on five reviews.

Online publication HotNewHipHop stated there was a lack of creativity, stating: "Quickly, however, it becomes clear that Future and Thug may not have as much chemistry as it would appear on paper. Thug and Future don't really do either. Instead, it feels more like a mixed bag collection of songs, some feeling unfinished and barely mixed, some feeling more formulaic ("insert verse here" type). Future and Young Thug should have chemistry, easily, which is all the more reason that they should have pushed themselves a step further." Calum Slingerland of Exclaim! believed that "the two collaborators have trouble finding common ground here. They're equally impressive in their own right – Future feeds his codeine paranoia on "Feed Me Dope" and gravelly closer "Group Home", while Thug jovially rides the peaks and valleys of the booming, ebullient "Cruise Ship" before crooning over the Biggie-interpolating guitars of "Killed Before" – but they rarely connect, and when they try on each other's styles, it's awkward".

In a mixed review, Sheldon Pearce of Pitchfork noted that "neither Future nor Thug is at the peak of his powers on Super Slimey, which forgoes explosiveness and poignancy for streamlined action, and many of the solo cuts shine brighter than the team-ups. Most of the songs are never greater than the sum of their parts. Even when the verses and hooks aren't pedestrian (by their standards), the segments seem cut together. But there are moments like the Offset-assisted "Patek Water" or "200" where the stars align and they seem like perfect companions, or at least sparring partners. Even when they don't click, you sometimes end up with two dynamic MCs trying to dunk on each other. If anything, Super Slimey is a reminder that compromise isn't always productive".

== Commercial performance ==
Super Slimey debuted at number two on the US Billboard 200 with 75,000 album-equivalent units, of which 15,000 were pure album sales in its first week of release. The album dropped to the number nine in its second week, earning an additional 31,000 album-equivalent units.

== Track listing ==
Credits adapted from Tidal and BMI.

Super Slimey track listing
No.	Title	Writer(s)	Producer(s)	Length
1.	"No Cap"	Nayvadius Wilburn; Jeffery Williams; Joshua Luellen	Southside; Max Lord^{[a]}	2:24
2.	"Three"	Wilburn; Williams; Luellen; Dwan Avery	Southside; DY	2:39
3.	"All da Smoke"	Wilburn; Williams; Tony Son	Richie Souf; Daniel East^{[a]}	3:24
4.	"200"	Wilburn; Williams; Jeffrey LaCroix; Wesley Glass	Tre Pounds; Wheezy	2:26
5.	"Cruise Ship" (performed by Young Thug)	Williams; Tariq Sharieff; Nick Emory	BLSSD; Chef	2:46
6.	"Patek Water" (featuring Offset)	Wilburn; Williams; Kiari Cephus; Masamune Kudo; Luellen; Avery	Southside; DY; Rex Kudo	3:09
7.	"Feed Me Dope" (performed by Future)	Wilburn; Willie Byrd	Will-A-Fool	2:46
8.	"Drip on Me"	Wilburn; Williams; Glass	Wheezy	3:19
9.	"Real Love"	Wilburn; Williams; Eduardo Earle; Javar Rockamore; Robert Reese; Theodore Thomas	Fuse; Rockamore^{[a]}; Bobby Keyz^{[a]}; Stonii^{[a]}	4:02
10.	"4 da Gang" (performed by Future)	Wilburn; Earle; Rockamore; Reese; Thomas	Fuse; Rockamore^{[a]}; Bobby Keyz^{[a]}; Stonii^{[a]}	3:07
11.	"Killed Before" (performed by Young Thug)	Williams; London Holmes	London on da Track	3:40
12.	"Mink Flow"	Wilburn; Williams; Michael Williams II	Mike Will Made It; Pluss^{[a]}	2:58
13.	"Group Home"	Wilburn; Williams; Earle; Bryan Simmons; Reese	Fuse; TM88; Bobby Keyz^{[a]}; Stonii^{[a]}	4:02
Total length:				41:48

Notes

- ^{^[a]} signifies an uncredited co-producer

== Charts ==
=== Weekly charts ===
Chart performance for Super Slimey
Chart (2017)	Peak position
Australian Albums (ARIA)	35
Belgian Albums (Ultratop Flanders)	59
Belgian Albums (Ultratop Wallonia)	81
Canadian Albums (Billboard)	5
Danish Albums (Hitlisten)	35
Dutch Albums (Album Top 100)	20
French Albums (SNEP)	41
German Albums (Offizielle Top 100)	69
New Zealand Albums (RMNZ)	32
Norwegian Albums (VG-lista)	15
Swedish Albums (Sverigetopplistan)	28
UK Albums (Official Charts)	23
US Billboard 200	2
US Top R&B/Hip-Hop Albums (Billboard)	1

=== Year-end charts ===
2017 year-end chart performance for Super Slimey
Chart (2017)	Position
US Top R&B/Hip-Hop Albums (Billboard)	75
