= Beautiful Thugger Girls =

Mixtape by Young Thug
- Released: June 16, 2017
- Studios: Billboard (Atlanta); Mean Streets (Atlanta); Silent Sound (Atlanta); Criteria (Miami); Jungle City (New York City); The White House (Santa Monica); Windmark (Santa Monica)
- Genres: Hip-hop; pop
- Length: 56:37
- Labels: 300; Atlantic
- Producers: Ben Billions; Billboard Hitmakers; BLSSD; Charlie Handsome; Judge; London; Post Malone; Rex Kudo; Scott Storch; Wheezy; Young Chop

Young Thug chronology
Jeffery (2016)	Beautiful Thugger Girls (2017)	Young Martha (2017)

Beautiful Thugger Girls is the fifth commercial mixtape by American rapper Young Thug. It was released on June 16, 2017, by 300 Entertainment and Atlantic Records. The mixtape features guest appearances from Millie Go Lightly, Gunna, Future, Quavo, Snoop Dogg, Lil Durk, and Jacquees. Production on the mixtape was handled by Billboard Hitmakers, Charlie Handsome, London, Rex Kudo, and Wheezy, among others.

Described by Young Thug as a "singing album", Beautiful Thugger Girls features crossovers with multiple musical genres such as R&B, dancehall and country. The album received widespread acclaim from music critics, debuted at number eight on the US Billboard 200, and at number four on the US Top R&B/Hip-Hop Albums.

== Background ==
On April 26, 2017, Young Thug originally announced that the project would be titled E.B.B.T.G., an abbreviation for Easy Breezy Beautiful Thugger Girls, which was a play on "easy, breezy, beautiful CoverGirl" as the slogan for CoverGirl. After several delays, the release date was hinted a week before release and officially confirmed two days before release. Beautiful Thugger Girls was described by Young Thug as a "singing album", which includes crossovers to musical genres such as R&B, dancehall and country. Although it has been referred to as an album by Young Thug, 300 Entertainment have reported it as a commercial mixtape.

== Critical reception ==
Professional ratings
Aggregate scores
Source	Rating
AnyDecentMusic?	7.8/10
Metacritic	84/100
Review scores
Source	Rating
The A.V. Club	B+
Crack Magazine	8/10
Exclaim!	9/10
Pitchfork	8.0/10
PopMatters	8/10
Pretty Much Amazing	B+
Tiny Mix Tapes	3.5/5
Tom Hull – on the Web	B+
Vice (Expert Witness)	(1-star Honorable Mention)
XXL	4/5

Beautiful Thugger Girls was met with widespread critical acclaim. At Metacritic, which assigns a normalized rating out of 100 to reviews from mainstream publications, the mixtape received an average score of 84, based on eight reviews. Aggregator AnyDecentMusic? gave it 7.8 out of 10, based on their assessment of the critical consensus.

Paul Thompson of Pitchfork labelled Beautiful Thugger Girls Young Thug's "most compelling experiment in pop", saying it "strips away all the clutter, leaving his best-developed melodies and most evocative songwriting to date" while comparing it to Lil Wayne's Rebirth. Scott Glaysher of XXL said, "Thug sounds the best he's ever sounded, despite some of the songs begin [sic] fairly far removed from his proverbial comfort zone". Daniel Bromfield of Pretty Much Amazing argued "Young Thug cycles through a lot of styles here: lovebird R&B, sensitive acoustic folk, even country. But he doesn't terraform them to his whims so much as try them on for size". Judnick Maynard of The Fader commented that Beautiful Thugger Girls "becomes more than a country album: the music isn't his master, instead he bends it to his will", and is a "testament to Young Thug's constantly evolving creative reach". Tiny Mix Tapes's Corrigan B stated: "Beautiful Thugger Girls is remarkable because of its Thugger-ness" but noted that "Beautiful Thugger Girls marks the point at which his pure lyricism, absent an unimpeachable sense of melody and flow, has begun to detract from the project as a whole."

The A.V. Club's Renatio Pagnani stated: "Few artists manage to balance wide-eyed eroticism with genuine warmth, and fewer manage the feat while packing multiple albums' worth of hooks into each song. For Thug, it's just his default mode." Winston Cook-Wilson of Spin said, "The album feels unprecedented within his catalog because it strikes a balance Thug has never quite pulled off on a single project: mixing a unified, album-wide sound with moments of aggressive experimentation and nagging hooks". Exclaim! critic Anya Zoledziowski thought that "Beautiful Thugger Girls—which lists Drake as executive producer—pushes the boundaries of Atlanta hip-hop while adding yet another groundbreaking project to the trapper's discography".

Robert Christgau was less impressed in his column for Vice. While highlighting "Take Care" and "Family Don't Matter", he summarized the mixtape as "singsong porn from a purple people eater who's seldom as funny as he used to be and sometimes funnier than he wants to be".

=== Year-end lists ===
Select year-end rankings of Beautiful Thugger Girls
Publication	List	Rank	Ref.
Crack Magazine	The Top 100 Albums of 2017	87	
HipHopDX	HipHopDX's Best Rap Albums of 2017	19	
Rap-Up	Rap-Up's 20 Best Albums of 2017	20	
Spin	50 Best Albums of 2017	22	

== Commercial performance ==
Beautiful Thugger Girls debuted at number eight on the US Billboard 200 and number four on the US Top R&B/Hip-Hop Albums with 37,000 album-equivalent units of which 7,000 were pure album sales in its first week of release. On December 6, 2019, the album was certified gold by the Recording Industry Association of America (RIAA) for combined sales and album-equivalent units of over 500,000 units in the United States.

== Track listing ==
Beautiful Thugger Girls track listing
No.	Title	Writer(s)	Producer(s)	Length
1.	"Family Don't Matter" (featuring Millie Go Lightly)	Jeffery Williams; Melissa Sarah Griffiths; Masamune Kudo; Wesley Glass	Wheezy; Rex Kudo	4:55
2.	"Tomorrow Til Infinity" (featuring Gunna)	Williams; Sergio Kitchens; Kudo; Benjamin Diehl	Rex Kudo; Ben Billions	3:48
3.	"She Wanna Party" (featuring Millie Go Lightly)	Williams; Griffiths; Kudo; Ryan Vojtesak	Rex Kudo; Charlie Handsome	4:10
4.	"Daddy's Birthday"	Williams; London Holmes; Scott Storch	London; Storch	3:28
5.	"Do U Love Me"	Williams; Holmes	London	3:29
6.	"Relationship" (featuring Future)	Williams; Nayvadius Wilburn; Eduardo Burgess; Jonathan De La Rosa; Tariq Sharrieff	Billboard Hitmakers; BLSSD	3:35
7.	"You Said" (featuring Quavo)	Williams; Quavious Marshall; Glass; Zhonzell Watson	Wheezy	6:42
8.	"On Fire"	Williams; Glass; Vojtesak	Wheezy; Charlie Handsome	3:59
9.	"Get High" (featuring Snoop Dogg and Lil Durk)	Williams; Calvin Cordozar Broadus Jr.; Durk Banks; Tyree Pittman	Young Chop	4:53
10.	"Feel It"	Williams; Glass	Wheezy	3:56
11.	"Me or Us"	Williams; Kudo; Vojtesak; Conor Oberst	Rex Kudo; Post Malone; Charlie Handsome	2:37
12.	"Oh Yeah"	Williams; Glass	Wheezy	3:49
13.	"For Y'all" (featuring Jacquees)	Williams; Burgess	Billboard Hitmakers	3:39
14.	"Take Care"	Williams; Paul Judge; James Brown	Judge	3:37
Total length:				56:37

Notes

- The vinyl version of "Me or Us" features a guest appearance by Travis Scott.

Samples

- "Me or Us" contains a sample from "First Day of My Life", written by Conor Oberst, and performed by Bright Eyes.
- "Take Care" contains a sample from "I Got You (I Feel Good)", written and performed by James Brown.

== Personnel ==
Credits adapted from the album's liner notes.

Performers

- Young Thug – vocals
- Millie Go Lightly – vocals (tracks 1, 3)
- Future – vocals (track 6)
- Quavo – vocals (track 7)
- Snoop Dogg – vocals (track 9)
- Lil Durk – vocals (track 9)
- Jacquees – vocals (track 13)

Technical

- Kesha Lee – record engineering (tracks 1, 6)
- Zeke Mishanec – record engineering (track 2)
- Dread – record engineering (tracks 3, 9, 14)
- Sean Riggins – record engineering (tracks 4, 5, 13)
- Bricks – record engineering (track 7)
- Drop – record engineering (track 8)
- Alex Tumay – mix engineering (all tracks), recording engineer (tracks 10, 11)
- Joe LaPorta – master engineering (all tracks)

Production

- Wheezy – production (tracks 1, 7, 8, 10, 12)
- Rex Kudo – production (tracks 1–3, 11)
- Ben Billions – production (track 2)
- Charlie Handsome – production (tracks 3, 8, 11)
- London – production (tracks 4, 5)
- Scott Storch – production (track 4)
- Billboard Hitmakers – production (tracks 6, 13)
- BLSSD – production (track 6)
- Young Chop – production (track 9)
- Post Malone – production (track 11)
- Judge – production (track 14)

Additional personnel

- Brian Ranney – project production
- Virgilio Tzaj – art direction and design
- Garfield Larmond – photography

== Charts ==
=== Weekly charts ===
Chart performance for Beautiful Thugger Girls
Chart (2017)	Peak position
Canadian Albums (Billboard)	34
Dutch Albums (Album Top 100)	43
French Albums (SNEP)	57
New Zealand Albums (RMNZ)	37
Swiss Albums (Schweizer Hitparade)	100
UK Albums (Official Charts)	71
US Billboard 200	8
US Top R&B/Hip-Hop Albums (Billboard)	4

=== Year-end charts ===
2017 year-end chart performance for Beautiful Thugger Girls
Chart (2017)	Position
US Billboard 200	161
US Top R&B/Hip-Hop Albums (Billboard)	57

== Certifications ==
Certifications for Beautiful Thugger Girls
Region	Certification	Certified units/sales
New Zealand (RMNZ)	Gold	7,500^{‡}
United States (RIAA)	Gold	500,000^{‡}
^{‡} Sales+streaming figures based on certification alone.

== Release history ==
Release dates and formats for Beautiful Thugger Girls
Region	Date	Label(s)	Format(s)	Ref.
Various	June 16, 2017	300; Atlantic	Digital download; streaming	
Various	January 26, 2018	300; Atlantic	Vinyl	
